= Kabir Bin Anwar =

Bangladeshi civil servant

- কবির বিন আনোয়ার
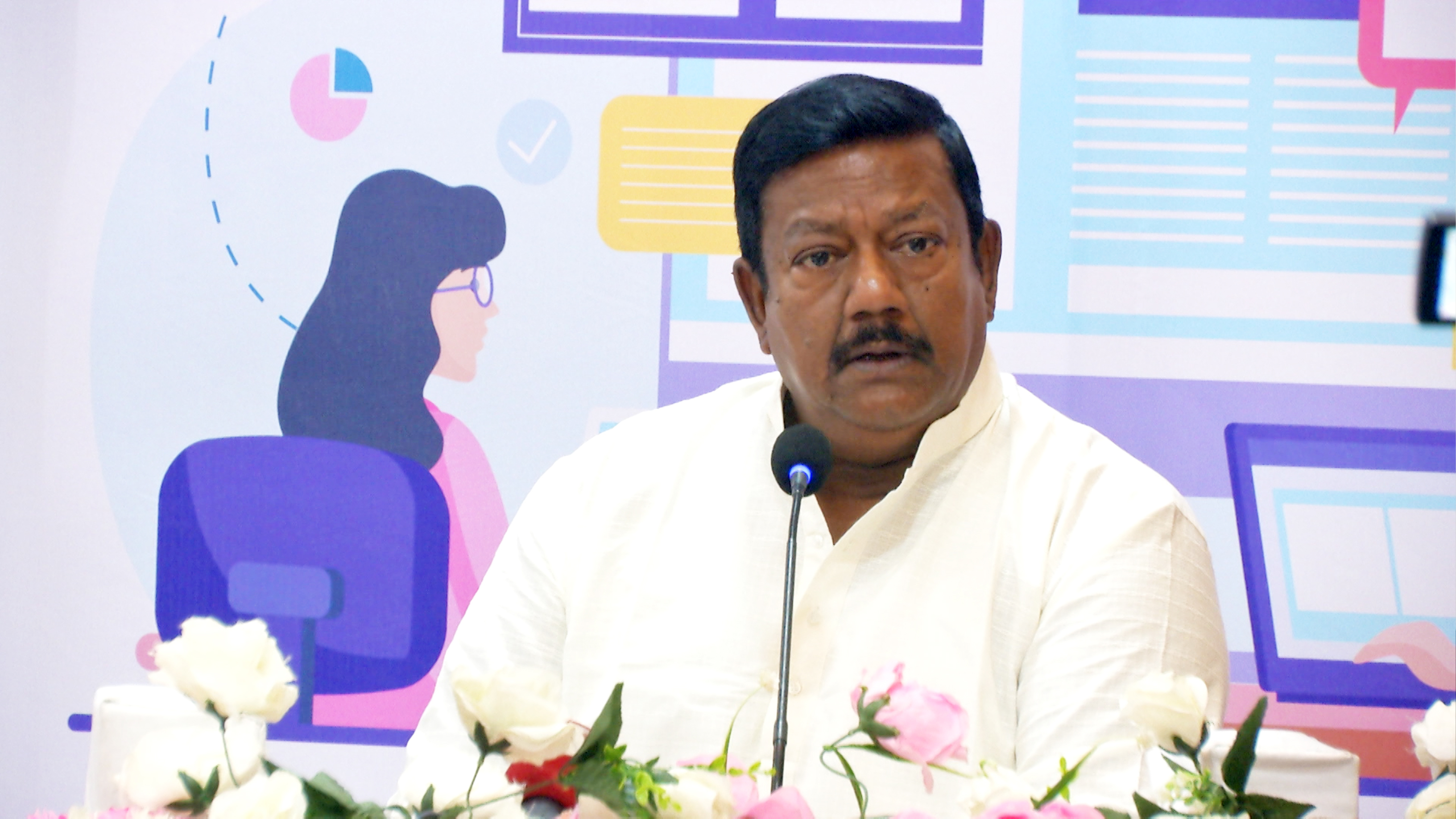
- Anwar in 2022

23rd Cabinet Secretary of Bangladesh
- In office 15 December 2022 – 3 January 2023
- Prime Minister: Sheikh Hasina
- Preceded by: Khandker Anwarul Islam
- Succeeded by: Md. Mahbub Hossain

President, Bangladesh Administrative Service Association
- In office 24 January 2021 – 3 January 2023
- Preceded by: Helaluddin Ahmed
- Succeeded by: Md. Mostafa Kamal

Senior Secretary Ministry of Water Resources
- In office 22 March 2018 – 11 December 2022
- Minister: Zahid Faruk
- Preceded by: Zafar Ahmed Khan
- Succeeded by: Nazmul Ahsan

Personal details
- Born: 4 January 1964 (age 62) Sirajganj District, East Pakistan, Pakistan
- Party: Bangladesh Awami League
- Spouse: Toufika Kabir
- Parent: Syeda Issabela (mother)
- Education: Dhaka Residential Model College; University of Dhaka
- Awards: Public Administration Medal (Bangladesh) (2016, 2018); WSIS Prize

Kabir Bin Anwar (born 4 January 1964) is a retired Bangladeshi civil servant and the 23rd Cabinet Secretary of the Bangladesh, serving for a short period of time from 15 December 2022 until he went to post-retirement leave on 3 January 2023. Prior to that, he was the senior secretary of the Ministry of Water Resources. Anwar is the chairperson of the Board of Directors of the Centre for Environmental and Geographic Information Services. He was the 28th president of the Bangladesh Administrative Service Association. He is the chairperson of the non-profit Isabela Foundation, named after his mother.

== Early life ==
Anwar was born on 1 January 1964 in Sirajganj District, East Pakistan, Pakistan. Anwar's mother was Syeda Issabela, a notable writer. He finished his schooling at Dhaka Residential Model College. He completed his LLB and Masters in political science from the University of Dhaka.

== Career ==
Anwar joined the Bangladesh Civil Service in 1985 as an Assistant Commissioner of Administration cadre.

Anwar had served as the first secretary at the Embassy of Bangladesh in The Hague, The Netherlands. In 2015 and 2016, Anwar was the project director of the a2i Programme. In 2015, he received an award from the World Summit on the Information Society for the project in May 2015. He had served as a director general of administration at the Prime Minister's Office.

On 22 March 2018, Anwar was appointed the secretary of the Ministry of Water Resources and the chairperson of the Board of Directors of the Centre for Environmental and Geographic Information Services from the Prime Minister's Office. He was promoted to the rank of senior secretary on 22 June 2020. He was the president of the National Committee for the Development of Bangladesh Scouts and was awarded the "Silver Tiger" medal by the scouts on 6 December 2020.

Anwar was elected as the president of the Bangladesh Administrative Service Association at the annual general meeting and replaced the outgoing president, Helal Uddin Ahmed. He spoke at the Climate Adaptation Summit in 2021. Anwar was the chairperson of the Institute of Water Modelling. On 17 March 2021, he met the water resource secretary of India, Shri Pankaj Kumar, to discuss water resource issues between the two countries. He provided food to people in Sirajganj District on 24 April 2021 during the COVID-19 pandemic in Bangladesh. On 25 June 2021, Anwar signed a performance agreement with AKM Wahed Uddin Chowdhury, director general of the Bangladesh Water Development Board. Anwar called for the arrest of Serniabat Sadiq Abdullah, the then mayor of Barishal City Corporation and nephew of the Prime Minister Sheikh Hasina, following an altercation between the Barishal Sadar Upazila Nirbahi Officer Munibur Rahman and employees of the Barishal City Corporation in August. He was appointed as the 23rd cabinet secretary on effect from 15 December 2022 and retired just after 19 days.

== Political career ==
On 10 January 2024, Anwar formally joined the Bangladesh Awami League. Prime Minister Sheikh Hasina, president of the Awami League, handed over the primary membership form to him at Ganabhaban.

After the fall of the Sheikh Hasina led Awami League government, a murder case was filed against him by Bangladesh Nationalist Party politician Mohammad Zaman Hossain Khan over the death of a protestor in July 2024.
