= Mohammad Abdul Momen =

Bangladeshi civil servant

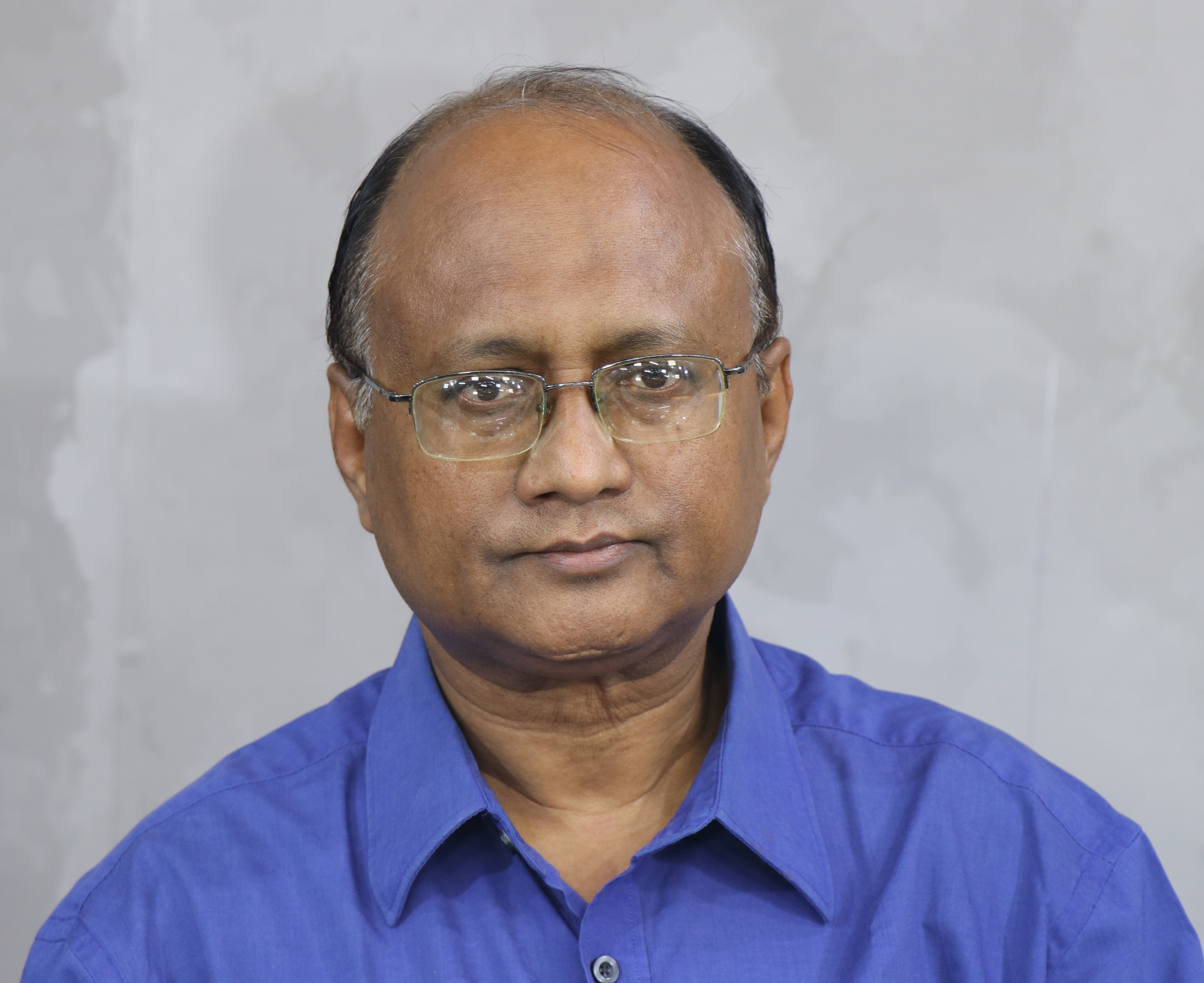
- Mohammad Abdul Momen in 2018

7th Chairman of the Anti-Corruption Commission
- In office 10 December 2024 – 3 March 2026
- Appointed by: President of Bangladesh
- President: Mohammed Shahabuddin
- Preceded by: Mohammad Moinuddin Abdullah
- Succeeded by: A. K. M. Asaduzzaman

Personal details
- Born: 1 January 1958 (age 68) Dhaka, East Pakistan (present day Bangladesh)
- Children: 2
- Education: University of Dhaka
- Profession: Civil servant

Mohammad Abdul Momen (born 1 January 1958) is a Bangladeshi retired civil servant and former chairman of the Anti-Corruption Commission. Previously he served as the secretary of the Public Security Division of the Ministry of Home Affairs. He was appointed after the fall of the Awami League government led by Sheikh Hasina and he sent a number of police officers into retirement after his appointment. He is a member of the board of governors of Bangladesh Institute of International and Strategic Studies. He is also an author, writing under the pen name Andalib Rashdi.

== Career ==
Momen joined the Bangladesh Civil Service in 1982. He served as private secretary to Prime Minister Khaleda Zia in the early 1990s. He served as the chairman of Bangladesh Road Transport Authority and managing director of Biman Bangladesh Airlines during the 2001 to 2006 Bangladesh Nationalist Party government.

Momen was sent to forced retirement in 2009 as an additional secretary after the Awami League came to power.

Momen was appointed Secretary of the Public Security Division on 18 August 2024 after the Sheikh Hasina-led Awami League government fell. At the same time four others were made contractual secretaries, Sheikh Abdur Rashid in the Secondary and Higher Education Division, Ehchanul Haque in Roads and Highways Department, Nasimul Gani in Public Department of President Mohammed Shahabuddin's Office, and M. A. Akmal Hossain Azad in Ministry of Railway. He replaced Md Mokabbir Hossain who was transferred to the Ministry of Science and Technology after serving three days as Secretary of the Public Security Division. At the same time the advisor in charge of the Ministry of Home Affairs was changed from Brigadier General M. Sakhawat Hossain to Lieutenant General Jahangir Alam Chowdhury.

Momen sent three senior police officers, Mohammad Ali Miah, Mahbubur Rahman, and Joydeb Kumar Bhadra, into forced retirement. In September, he sent sent nine more police officers, AKM Hafiz Akhtar, Bashir Ahmed, Devdas Bhattacharya, Khandker Lutful Kabir, Mir Rezaul Alam, Imam Hossain, Mizanur Rahman, Chowdhury Manjurul Kabir, Dadon Fakir, Shamim or Rashid Talukder, and Rafiqul Islam, into forced retirement. He then sent Krishna Pada Roy, Mozammel Haque, and Sarder Rakibul Islam into retirement. He sent three more police officers, Harun Ur Rashid, Shahabuddin Khan, and Kh Mahid Uddin, into forced retirement in October. He rehired five police officers, Abdullah Al Mamun, Ali Hossain Khan, Delwar Hossain Mia, Nazmul Karim Khan, and Zillur Rahman, who were sent to retirement by the previous Awami League government.

In March 2026, Momen resigned from the Anti-Corruption Commission along with fellow commissioners Brigadier General (retired) Hafiz Ahsan Farid and Mia Mohammad Ali Akbar Azizi.
