= M. A. Akmal Hossain Azad =

M. A. Akmal Hossain Azad was secretary of the Health Services Division and former secretary of the Ministry of Railways. He was appointed on a contractual basis after the fall of the Awami League government.

== Career ==
In 2004, Azad was the personal secretary to the Minister of Law, Justice and Parliament Affairs Moudud Ahmed when he was promoted to the rank of joint secretary. In November 2006, he was transferred from the Ministry of Establishment to the Rural Development and Co-operatives Division. In February 2008, he was the chairman of the Bangladesh Forest Industries Development Corporation when he was transferred to the Ministry of Agriculture as an additional secretary.

Azad is a director of Bangladesh International Arbitration Centre.

Azad was appointed secretary of the Ministry of Railway on 18 August 2024 after the Sheikh Hasina-led Awami League government fell. At the same time four others were made contractual secretaries, Sheikh Abdur Rashid in the Secondary and Higher Education Division, Ehchanul Haque in Roads and Highways Department, Mohammad Abdul Momen in Public Security Division, and Nasimul Gani in Public Department of President Mohammed Shahabuddin's Office. He was appointed secretary of the Health Services Division replacing Md Jahangir Alam after three days at the Ministry of Railways. Abdul Baki replaced him at the Ministry of Railway. He dissolved the board of Bangladesh Red Crescent Society. He stated 625 people were killed in protests against Sheikh Hasina. He was one man probe body that examined unrest at the Ministry of Public Administration over appointment of deputy commissioners.
