= Imtiaz Mahmud =

Bangladeshi-Bengali poet

- Occupations: Poet, civil servant
- Writing career
- Language: Bengali
- Notable awards: Krittibas (Kolkata)

Imtiaz Mahmud is a Bangladeshi Bengali poet who also is an admin cadre of the Bangladesh Civil Service (BCS).

Imtiaz currently is one of the leading poets of the Bengali Language, known in both Bangladesh and West Bengal. His ideology, use of language and analogy, and portrayal of unorthodox ideas are noted in contemporary Bengali literature. His writings had immensely inspired the recent (July Revolution 2024) Student-led movement that ousted the Hasina Govt. in Bangladesh.

== Early life ==
In 2006 Imtiaz joined the Bangladesh Civil Service.

== Literary style and works ==
The diversity of modern Bengali poetry by Mahmud and others widened significantly in the last two decades of the previous century. The changes in socio-economic, technological, cultural, and political scenarios of Bengal region (especially after the partition of 1947) have impacted Bengali literature from that of the classic Bengali authors like Tagore and his era. Poets are found in contrast to their literary character with their personal character, but the school where Imtiaz belongs is different. Critics consider him to be an admirer of staying by himself or detached from public programs, which in his writings he portrays vividly.

== Awards ==
Imtiaz was acknowledged with the Sunil Gangopadhyay Memorial "Krittibas Literary Awards" 2016 for his literary work in "পেন্টাকল / in English: Pentacle" (2015).

== Physical condition ==
Imtiaz Mahmud was diagnosed with thyroid cancer in March 2022. He took treatment from Chennai, India, where he had undergone a successful surgery and follow-up treatment.
