= Abdul Aziz (secretary) =

Former Cabinet Secretary of Bangladesh

Md Abdul Aziz is a former Cabinet Secretary of Bangladesh.

== Career ==
Aziz was the Joint Secretary at the Ministry of Establishment and officer on special duty in 2003 when he was promoted in August.

In 2005, Aziz was promoted to the rank of Secretary while serving as the acting secretary at the Ministry of Water Resources.

Aziz was the Secretary of the Ministry of Agriculture. He had served as a member of the Bangladesh Planning Commission.

Aziz was appointed the Cabinet Secretary on 28 November 2008 replacing Ali Imam Majumder under Chief Adviser Fakhruddin Ahmed of the caretaker government. He also served under the next government under Prime Minister Sheikh Hasina. He served as the chairman of the Superior Selection Board which promoted a large number of bureaucrats beyond the number of vacancies resulting in the creation of officers on special duty. Former Prime Minister Khaleda Zia filed a contempt of court petition against Aziz and other government officials following her eviction from her residence in Dhaka Cantonment.

Aziz served contractually as the Cabinet Secretary after his retirement. In October 2011, M Musharraf Hossain Bhuiyan replaced Aziz as the Cabinet Secretary of Bangladesh. In February 2012, his name was considered for the Commissioner of the Election Commission.

Aziz is a senior advisor to the ASA.
