= Mohammad Shafiul Alam =

Bangladeshi civil servant (born 1959)

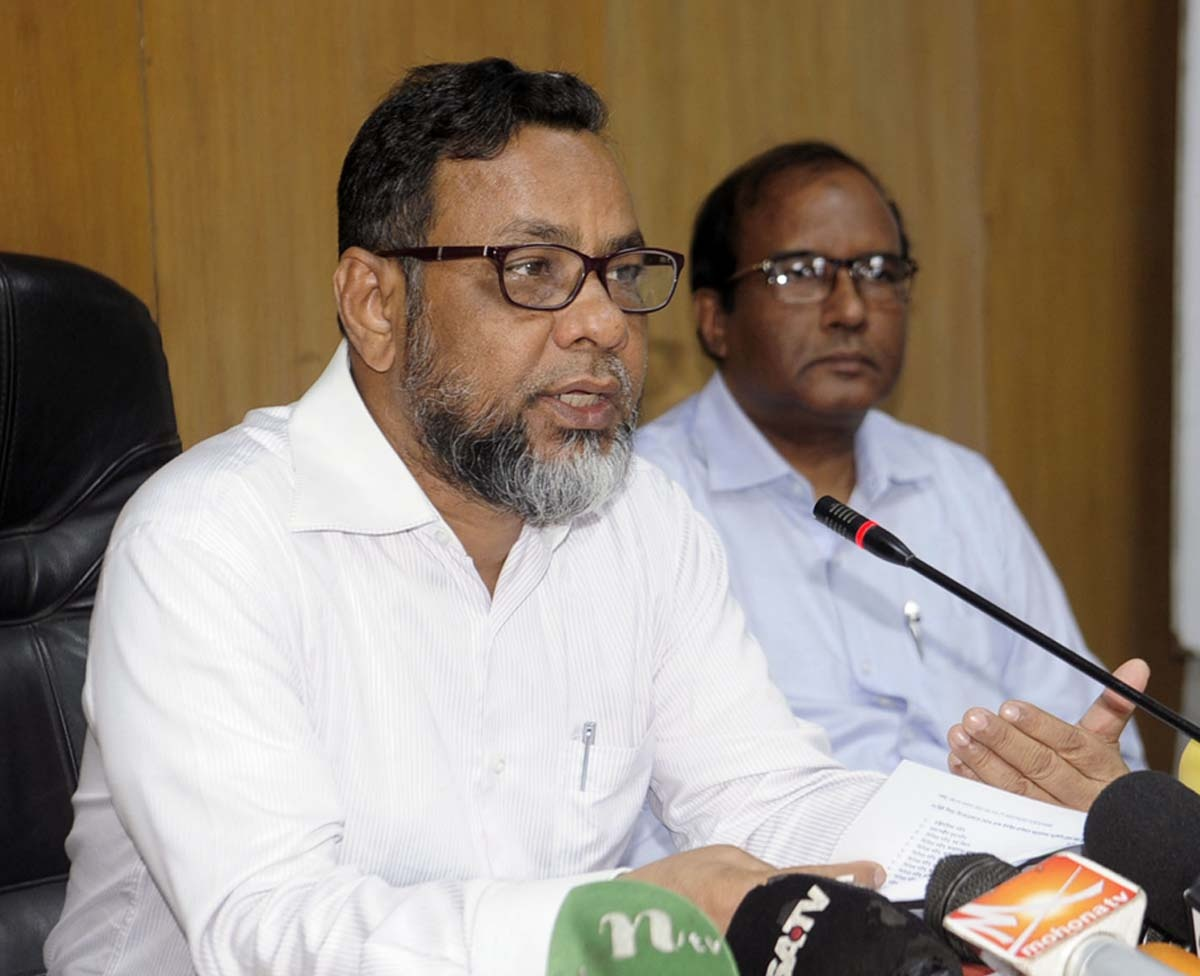
- Shafiul in 2017

21st Cabinet Secretary of Bangladesh
- In office 29 October 2015 – 28 October 2019
- Prime Minister: Sheikh Hasina
- Preceded by: M Musharraf Hossain Bhuiyan
- Succeeded by: Khandker Anwarul Islam

Personal details
- Born: 14 December 1959 (age 66) Ukhia, Cox's Bazar District, Bangladesh
- Citizenship: Bangladesh
- Education: University of Chittagong; University of Birmingham
- Occupation: Government official

Mohammad Shafiul Alam (born 14 December 1959) is a Bangladeshi civil servant. He was the country's 21st Cabinet Secretary. He is World Bank Group Alternate Executive Director representing Bangladesh, Bhutan, India and Sri Lanka since November 2019.

== Early life and education ==
Alam was born in Cox's Bazar on 14 December 1959. He did his BA and LLB in 1979-80 and an MA in English in 1981 from the University of Chittagong. He also obtained an MS degree in Development Administration from Birmingham University, United Kingdom.

== Career ==
Alam is a member of Bangladesh Administrative Service and Bangladesh Civil Service 1982 regular batch and has served important positions in field administration. He was the Deputy Commissioner and District Magistrate of Magura and Mymensingh District. He was a Member Directing Staff (MDS) of Bangladesh Public Administration Training Centre (BPATC). He served as Chairman of National Housing Authority under the Ministry of Public Works and of Bangladesh Forest Industries Development Corporation under the Ministry of Environment and Forest. He also served as the Divisional Commissioner of Rajshahi Division. He served as Additional Secretary at the Ministry of Communications. He also served as Secretary of the President's Office. Then he served as Chairman of the Land Appeal Board and as Senior Secretary of Ministry of Land. He served as the Cabinet Secretary to the government of Bangladesh till October 2019. Then he joined at the World Bank.
