= Abu Solaiman Chowdhury =

Bangladeshi freedom fighter and civil servant (1950–2019)

- Born: 30 January 1950; Sadhonpur, Banskhali, Chittagong, Bangladesh
- Died: 27 September 2019 (aged 69); United Hospital, Dhaka, Bangladesh
- Occupations: Civil Servant, Cabinet Secretary

Abu Solaiman Chowdhury was a Bangladeshi freedom fighter and former cabinet secretary of Bangladesh.

== Career ==
Chowdhury joined Bangladesh Administrative Service in 1973.

Chowdhury served as Deputy Commissioner of Dhaka and Pabna . He also served as Divisional Commissioner of Dhaka Division, Director Prime Minister's Office and Secretary of Ministry of Youth and Sports, Ministry of Cultural Affairs, Ministry of Liberation War Affairs, President's Office and Cabinet Division. When he was the Secretary of Ministry of Liberation War Affairs he played an important role in shifting the grave of Matiur Rahman from Pakistan to Bangladesh.

Besides, Chowdhury also served as Chairman of Bangladesh Privatization Commission and Bangladesh Table Tennis Federation. He also connected with Chattogram Samity in Dhaka.

== Death ==
Chowdhury died on 27 September 2019 in United Hospital, Dhaka.
