= Thana Nirbahi Officer =

Bangladeshi administrative post

- থানা নির্বাহী অফিসার

Thana Nirbahi Officer (TNO) (Bengali: থানা নির্বাহী অফিসার, literally: Police Station Executive Officer) was a Bangladeshi interim administrative post. TNOs were drawn from members of the administrative cadre of Bangladesh Civil Service (BCS). The TNO system was abolished in 2009 after the Awami League returned to power and the previous upazila system returned.

== History ==
The government under CMLA Hussain Muhammad Ershad formed and constituted a committee for administrative reforms in 1982. The Thana parishad was created, and a post named Thana Nirbahi Officer was created and TNO system was made to put effect in each Upgraded Thana outside metropolitan police jurisdictions and municipalities. Subdivision as an administrative unit was abolished, and all subdivisions except those under Sadar (headquarters) were converted to districts. Responsibility for pro-development activities at the local level was transferred to Thana Parishad, except for significant development activities of national and regional coverage. It was decided that until chairman of Thana parishad is elected, the TNO would act as the chairman of Thana parishad as an interim post, the Local Government law was accordingly amended.

TNOs were drawn from senior-scale officers of the administrative cadre of Bangladesh Civil Service.

The upazila system was again scrapped in 1992 and the thana system returned after the Bangladesh Nationalist Party returned to power. It rejected the upazila system and adopted the thana system.

In 2009 after the Awami League returned to power, the upazila system again returned, the Upazila Nirbahi Officer designation also returned, thus the Thana Nirbahi Officer post was abolished.
