= Shafiul Azim =

Shafiul Azim is a secretary and former CEO and managing director of Biman Bangladesh Airlines. He is the former secretary of the Bangladesh Election Commission. He is the former Joint Secretary of the Cabinet Division. He was the additional secretary of the Law and Rules Division of the Cabinet Division.

== Career ==
Azim joined the Bangladesh Civil Service in 1995.

In 2009, Azim was elected vice-president of the 15th BCS Forum. He was the deputy director of the Bangladesh Public Administration Training Centre.

Azim was made CEO and managing director of Biman Bangladesh Airlines in December 2022 replacing Zahid Hossain who had faced a scandal over recruitment test leaks. He was previously stationed at the Cabinet Division. He negotiated with Airbus to purchase planes for Biman Bangladesh Airlines. He signed an agreement for code sharing between Biman Bangladesh and Air Canada. He took steps to develop Biman Bangladesh into a smart airlines. Muhammad Faruk Khan, Minister of Civil Aviation and Tourism, ordered Azim to talk to Boeing about problems with the Boeing 787 Dreamliner aircraft. He established a number of new routes for Biman Bangladesh including Dhaka to Rome. He took steps to reduce baggage theft during ground handling. Biman Bangladesh Airlines faced a malware attack under him. In May 2024, Mohammad Jahidul Islam Bhuiyan, former additional secretary at the Prime Minister's Office, replaced him as CEO and managing director of Biman Bangladesh Airlines.

In May 2024, Azim was appointed secretary of the Bangladesh Election Commission replacing Md Jahangir Alam after being promoted to secretary. He approved registration of Ganosamhati Andolon and Gono Odhikar Parishad. In August 2024, following the fall of the Sheikh Hasina led Awami League government, he cancelled a foreign trip by the Chief Election Commissioner of Bangladesh Kazi Habibul Awal. In December 2024, he was removed from office and made an officer on special duty at the Ministry of Public Administration.
