= Syeda Issabela =

- সৈয়দা ইসাবেলা
- Born: 1942 (age 83–84); Kolkata, British India
- Occupation: Writer

Syeda Issabela was a Bangladeshi writer and veteran of Bangladesh Liberation war.

== Early life ==
Issabela was born in 1942 in Kolkata, West Bengal, British India. She studied at Sakhawat Memorial School. She moved to Sirajganj after the Kolkata riots on 16 August 1946 during Direct Action Day. Her father was Syed Ishaq Shirazi and her great-uncle was the notable writer Ismail Hossain Siraji. Her mother was Asiya Khatun. She married Anwar Hossain Ratu with whom she had six children, five daughters and one son. Her son, Kabir Bin Anwar, was a senior secretary and former president of Bangladesh Administrative Service Association.

== Career ==
Issabela worked as a teacher. After her retirement in 2002 she became a prolific writer and wrote 22 books. She was awarded the Ekushey Padak in 2021.

== Death ==
Issabela died on 12 January 2013.
