= Begum Kamrun Nahar =

Bangladeshi Bureaucrate

Begum Kamrun Nahar is a former secretary of the Ministry of Information and Broadcasting. She was the first woman in Bangladesh to become Principal Information Officer. She is a former secretary of the Ministry of Women and Children Affairs.

== Early life ==
Nahar was born in Brahmanbaria District. She completed her master's from the Social Welfare and Research Institute of the University of Dhaka in 1983. She has a diploma in journalism from the Press Institute of Bangladesh.

== Career ==
In 1984, Nahar joined the Bangladesh Civil Service as administration cadre.

Nahar was appointed the principal information officer at the Press Information Department in February 2017. She was the first woman to hold the position of principal information officer. Before that, she was the director general of the Department of Films and Publications and Directorate of Mass Communication. She was the former director general of the Bangladesh Film Archive. She is a former vice-chairman of the Bangladesh Film Censor Board.

On 25 January 2019, Nahar was appointed secretary of the Ministry of Women and Children Affairs.

On 30 December 2019, Nahar was transferred from the post of secretary of the Ministry of Women and Children Affairs to secretary of information and broadcasting.

In November 2020, Nahar went on post-retirement leave while serving as secretary at the Ministry of Information and Broadcasting. Khaja Mia replaced her as the secretary of the Ministry of Information and Broadcasting.

== Personal life ==
Nahar is married to Khandakar Anowarul Islam, former Cabinet Secretary of Bangladesh. They have two children. In June 2020, she contracted COVID-19 during the COVID-19 pandemic in Bangladesh.
