= Ahmad Kaikaus =

Bangladeshi government official

- আহমদ কায়কাউস
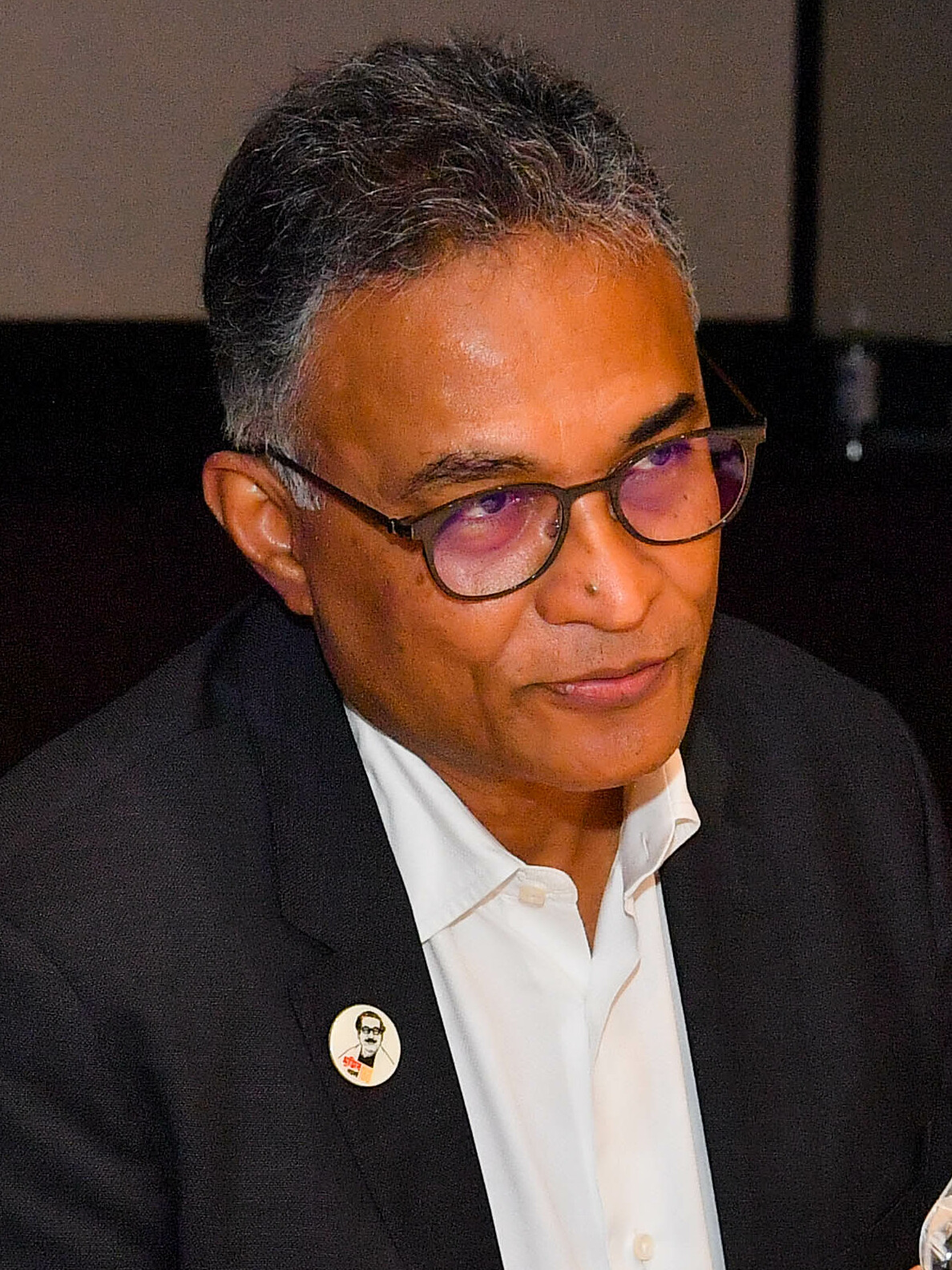
- Kaikaus in 2021

Alternate Executive Director World Bank Group
- In office 15 December 2022 – 7 February 2024
- Preceded by: Mohammad Shafiul Alam

Principal Secretary to the Prime Minister Prime Minister's Office
- In office 1 January 2020 – 14 December 2022
- Prime Minister: Sheikh Hasina
- Preceded by: Nojibur Rahman
- Succeeded by: Tofazzel Hossain Miah

Personal details
- Born: 1 January 1962 (age 64) Chittagong, Bangladesh
- Spouse: Mafruha Ahmad
- Children: 2
- Education: University of Chittagong; Williams College; University of Texas at Dallas

Ahmad Kaikaus is a retired Bangladeshi civil servant who served as the Alternate Executive Director of World Bank. He served as the Principal Secretary to the Prime Minister of Bangladesh.

== Education ==
Kaikaus completed his bachelor's degree and master's from the University of Chittagong. He completed his second master's at the Center for Development Economics at Williams College. He earned a PhD at the University of Texas at Dallas.

== Career ==
On 21 January 1986, Kaikaus joined the Bangladesh Civil Service in the administrative cadre. He has worked as a Upazila Nirbahi Officer, magistrate and several other positions in the field and central secretariat in the early stages of his career. He served as the chairperson of the Bangladesh Energy and Power Research Council. He taught at the American International University-Bangladesh and Collin College in Texas.

On 23 February 2017, he was appointed secretary in charge of the Power Division of the Ministry of Power, Energy and Mineral Resources. He worked at the International Food Policy Research Institute for three years as the deputy chief of the Policy Research and Strategy Support Program. In August 2019, he led the Bangladeshi team to the joint steering committee on Bangladesh-India Power Sector Cooperation. He rejected the import of electricity from Tripura, finding its infrastructure inadequate.

On 29 December 2019, he was appointed the Principal Secretary of the Prime Minister's Office under Prime Minister Sheikh Hasina. He was reappointed by the prime minister in December 2020 with a 2-year extension.

On 7 February 2024, Kaikaus was relieved from his role as the Alternate Executive Director of World Bank Group with immediate effect. After the fall of the Sheikh Hasina led Awami League government, a murder case was filed against him by Bangladesh Nationalist Party politician Mohammad Zaman Hossain Khan over the death of a protestor in July 2024.
