= Khandker Anwarul Islam =

Bangladeshi civil servant

- খন্দকার আনোয়ারুল ইসলাম
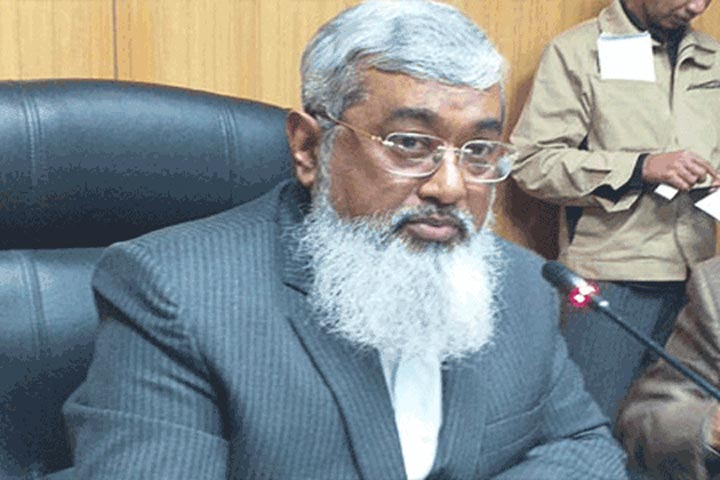
- Anwarul Islam in 2019

22nd Cabinet Secretary of Bangladesh
- In office 28 October 2019 – 15 December 2022
- Prime Minister: Sheikh Hasina
- Preceded by: Mohammad Shafiul Alam
- Succeeded by: Kabir Bin Anwar

Senior Secretary Bridges Division
- In office 13 November 2011 – 27 October 2019
- Prime Minister: Sheikh Hasina
- Minister: Obaidul Quader
- Succeeded by: Md. Belayet Hossain

Personal details
- Born: 1 January 1960 (age 66) Tangail District, Bangladesh
- Spouse: Begum Kamrun Nahar
- Education: University of Dhaka
- Known for: Government official

Khandker Anwarul Islam is a retired Bangladeshi civil servant. He had served as the country's 22nd Cabinet Secretary. Prior to that, he was the Senior Secretary of the Bridges Division under Ministry of Road Transport and Bridges and the ex-officio Executive Director of Bangladesh Bridge Authority before joining at cabinet secretary post on 28 October 2019.

== Career ==
Islam joined Bangladesh Civil Service (Special) in 1983 as an Upazila Magistrate under administration cadre after graduating with a Bachelor's and Master's Degree in Social Welfare from Dhaka University. At the beginning of his career, he served as Upazila Nirbahi Officer (UNO), Additional Deputy Commissioner and Director in National Sports Council. After that he served as senior assistant secretary and Deputy Secretary in Parliament Secretariat, as Director in the Department of Relief and Rehabilitation under Ministry of Disaster Management and Relief and as Secretary in National Sports Council.

Islam also served as Joint Secretary and Additional Secretary in the Cabinet Division prior to his joining in the Bridges Division. He joined Bridges Division as Secretary in-charge on 13 November 2011, promoted to Secretary on 31 January 2013 and Senior Secretary on 13 July 2017. He had been appointed as the Cabinet Secretary on 28 October 2019 and retired on 15 December 2022.

== Personal life ==
Islam is married to Begum Kamrun Nahar, former Secretary to the Ministry of Information and Broadcasting. The couple have two sons.
