= Naqib Ahmed Chowdhury =

Major General of Bangladesh Army

- নকিব আহমদ চৌধুরী
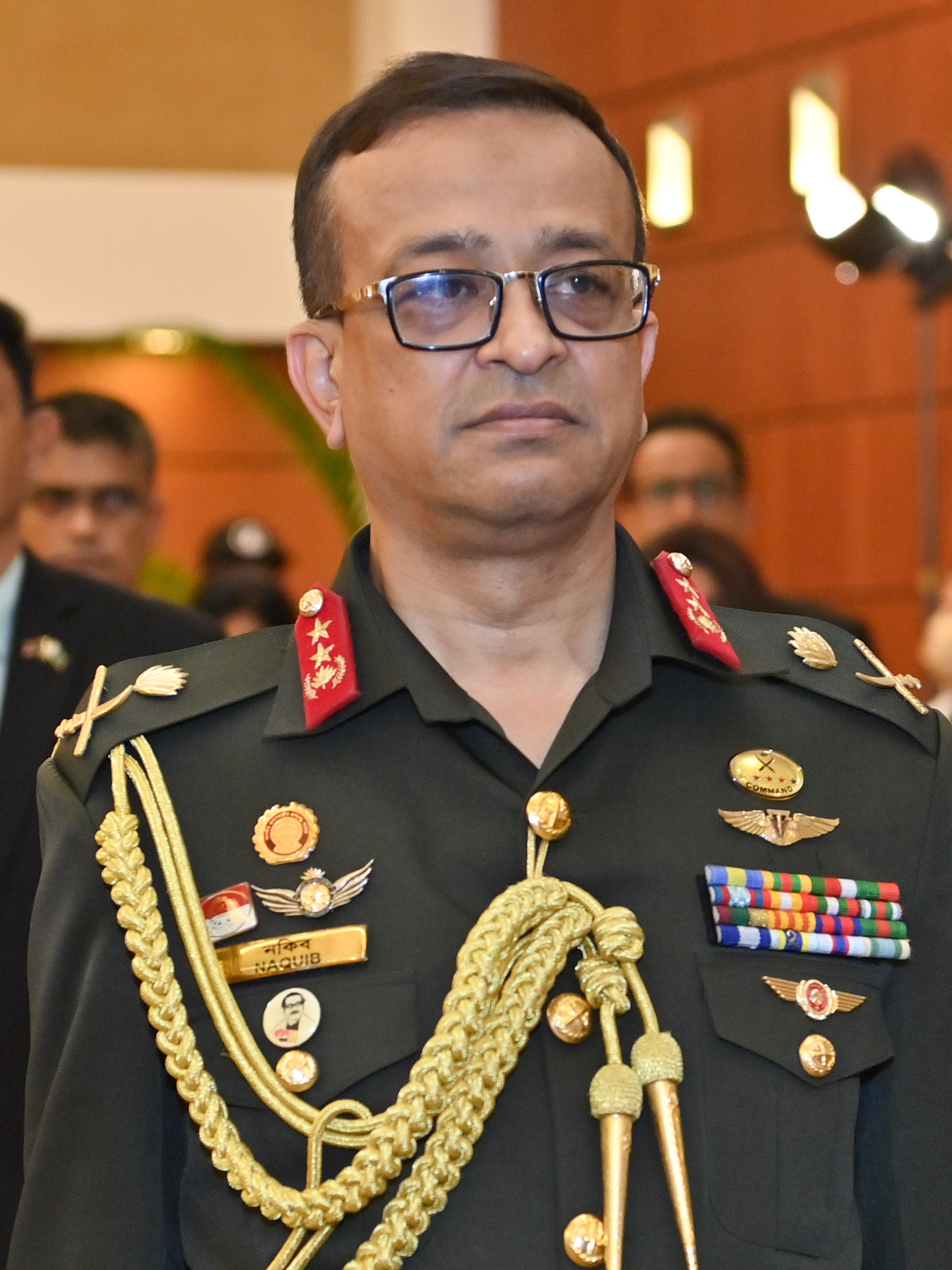
- Chowdhury in the Maldives in 2021
- Military career
- Allegiance: Bangladesh
- Branch: Bangladesh Army
- Service years: 1988–2024
- Rank: Major General
- Unit: East Bengal Regiment
- Commands: GOC of 19th Infantry Division; Military Secretary to Prime Minister; GOC of 7th Infantry Division; Commander of 46th Independent Infantry Brigade; Commander of 69th Infantry Brigade

Naqib Ahmed Chowdhury is a retired major general of the Bangladesh Army. He served as general officer commanding (GOC) of the 19th Infantry Division. Prior to that, he was military secretary to the Prime Minister of Bangladesh, Sheikh Hasina, from December 2019 to March 2022.

== Career ==
Chowdhury is a former college secretary of the National Defence College.

Chowdhury was the commander of an infantry brigade in the Bandarban region in 2015. He inaugurated a school by the JAAGO Foundation along with Superintendent of Police of Bandarban District Devdas Bhattacharya and Bohmong king U Chaw Prue Choudhury. He is a director of Trust Bank.

From 11 June 2018 to 13 January 2019, he was the commander, 46th Independent Infantry Brigade.

In 2019, he was the college secretary of the National Defense College.

Later, he became general officer commanding (GOC) of the 7th Infantry Division and area commander, Barishal Area, Patuakhali District.
