= Quazi Rosy =

Bangladeshi poet and politician (1949–2022)

- কাজী রোজী
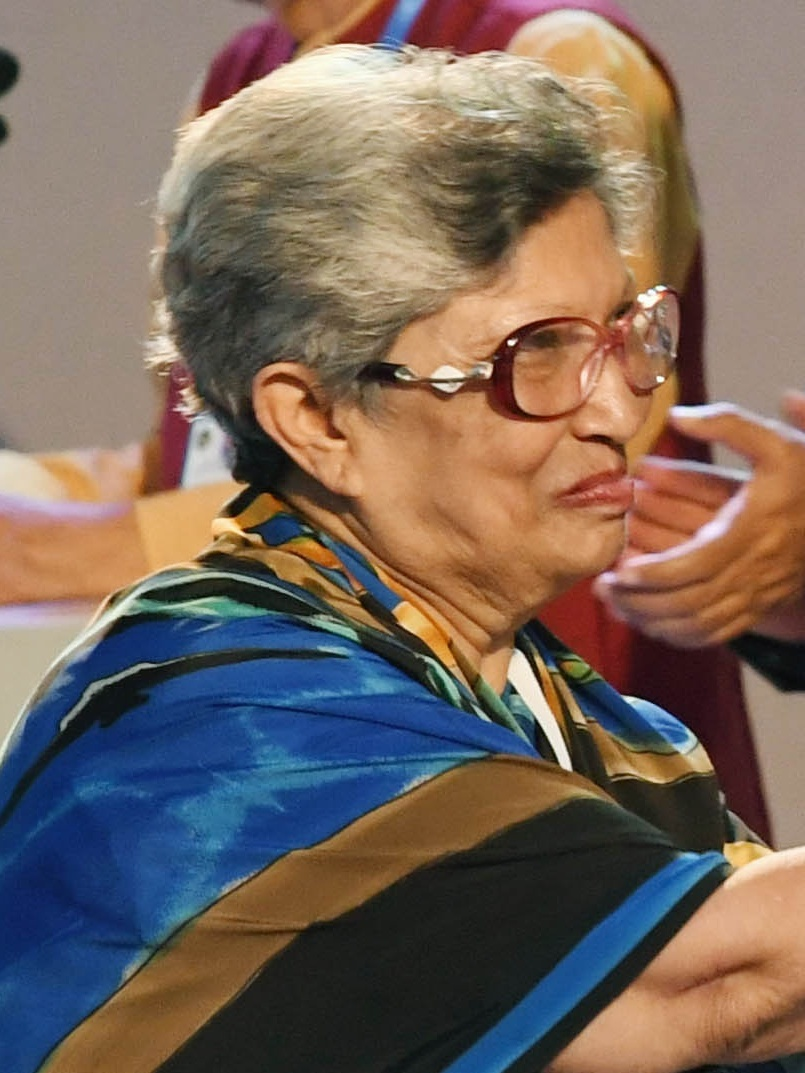
- Rosy receiving 2018 Bangla Academy Literary Award

Member of Parliament for Reserved women's seat-41
- In office 20 March 2014 – 30 December 2018

Personal details
- Born: 1 January 1949 Satkhira, East Bengal, Pakistan
- Died: 20 February 2022 (aged 73) Dhaka, Bangladesh
- Party: Awami League
- Occupation: Poet, politician
- Awards: Bangla Academy Literary Award (2018); Ekushey Padak (2021)

Quazi Rosy (also spelled Quazy Rosy; 1 January 1949 – 20 February 2022) was a Bangladeshi poet who served also as member of the parliament. She is known for Pothghat Manusher Naam and Amar Piraner Kono Map Nei.

== Early life ==
Rosy was born on 1 January 1949 in Satkhira District of the then East Pakistan. Her father was Quazi Shahidul Islam. She obtained her bachelor's and master's degrees in Bangla literature from the University of Dhaka.

== Career ==
Rosy started her career by joining in the government service and retired as an officer from the Press Information Department in 2007. She was elected to parliament from a reserved seat (number 41) for women after the 10th Bangladeshi parliamentary election held on 5 January 2014. She received Bangla Academy Literary Award in the year 2018 for her contribution in poetry and Ekushey Padak in 2021 for her contribution to language and literature.

== Personal life and death ==
In 2013, Rosy testified against the convicted war criminal and former Jamaat leader Abdul Quader Molla standing trial at the International Crimes Tribunal on charges of crimes against humanity.

After testing positive for COVID-19, on 30 January 2022, Rosy was admitted to Square Hospital. After suffering a stroke, she died on 20 February 2022, at the age of 73.

== Works ==
- Pothghat Manusher Naam
- Amar Piraner Kono Map Nei

== Awards ==
- Bangla Academy Literary Award (2018)
- Ekushey Padak (2021)
