= Flood Forecasting and Warning Centre =

- Formation: 1972
- Headquarters: Dhaka, Bangladesh
- Region served: Bangladesh
- Official language: Bengali
- Website: ffwc.gov.bd

Flood Forecasting and Warning Centre is a government agency that forecasts floods in Bangladesh. It is headquartered in Dhaka. The centre is an important part of the government mechanism that deals with flooding in Bangladesh.

== History ==
The Flood Forecasting and Warning Centre was established in 1972 under the Bangladesh Water Development Board. It is under the Ministry of Water Resources. The centre has 109 water level monitoring stations and 61 forecasting stations throughout Bangladesh.
