= Cabinet Secretary (Bangladesh) =

Head of the Bangladeshi Civil Service

Cabinet Secretary of Bangladesh
- বাংলাদেশের মন্ত্রিপরিষদ সচিব
- Government Seal of Bangladesh

- Flag of Bangladesh

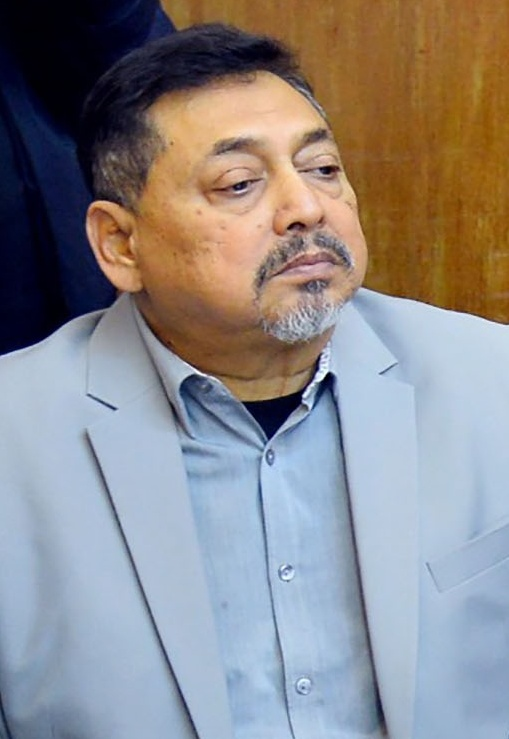
- Incumbent; Nasimul Gani since 17 February 2026
- Government of Bangladesh; Cabinet Division
- Type: Civil Servant
- Status: Chief of Cabinet Secretariat
- Member of: Cabinet; Cabinet Division; Bangladesh Administrative Service; Bangladesh Civil Service
- Reports to: Prime Minister
- Residence: Minto Road, Ramna, Dhaka
- Seat: Bangladesh Secretariat, Dhaka
- Appointer: Prime Minister
- Term length: Until the age of 59; Term contractually extendable
- Inaugural holder: Hossain Toufique Imam
- Formation: 16 December 1971; 54 years ago
- Salary: ৳157500 (US$1,300) per month (incl. allowanced)
- Website: official website

Cabinet Secretary is the highest ranking civil servant of Bangladesh Civil Service and the Chief of the Cabinet Division of Bangladesh. He is the ex-officio Chairman of Superior Selection Board and head of all civil services under the Rules of Business of the Government of Bangladesh. He holds the 12th position in the Warrant of Precedence of Bangladesh. Cabinet Secretary is appointed from Bangladesh Civil Service Administration cadre, known as Bangladesh Administrative Service.

The current Cabinet Secretary of the Republic is Dr. Nasimul Gani. He is the 26th Cabinet Secretary to the government of Bangladesh. The Cabinet Secretary is considered as arguably the most powerful civil servant in Bangladesh.

== List of Cabinet Secretaries ==
The position holder is responsible for ensuring that the Civil Service is equipped with the skills and capabilities to meet the everyday challenges it faces and that civil servants work in a fair working environment.

Sl	Name	Year
1	Hossain Toufique Imam	1971 to 1975
2	Shafiul Azam	1975 to 1976
3	Abdul Momen Khan	1976 to 1977
4	M. Keramat Ali	1977 to 1982
5	Mohammad Mahbubuzzaman	1982 to 1986
6	Md. Mujibul Hoque	1986 to 1989
7	M. K. Anwar	1990 to 1991
8	Md. Siddiqur Rahman	1991 to 1992
9	M. Ayubur Rahman	1992 to 1996
10	Syed Ahmed	1996 to 1997
11	Ataul Haque	1997 to 1998
12	Qazi Shamsul Alam	1998 to 2001
13	Dr. Akbar Ali Khan	2001 to 2002
14	Dr. Kamal Uddin Siddique	2002 to 2002
15	Dr. Saadat Husain	2002 to 2005
16	A S M Abdul Halim	2005 to 2006
17	Md. Abu Solaiman Chowdhury	2006 to 2006
18	Ali Imam Majumder	2006 to 2008
19	Md Abdul Aziz	2008 to 2011
20	M Musharraf Hossain Bhuiyan	2011 to 2015
21	Mohammad Shafiul Alam	2015 to 2019
22	Khandker Anwarul Islam	2019 to 2022
23	Kabir Bin Anwar	2022 to 2023
24	Md. Mahbub Hossain	2023 to 2024
25	Sheikh Abdur Rashid	2024 to 2026
26	Md. Siraj Uddin Miah	2026 to 2026
27	Nasimul Gani	2026 to present
