= Devdas Bhattacharya =

Bangladeshi police officer

Chief Executive of Railway Police
- In office 13 March 2024 – 22 September 2024
- Appointed by: Minister of Home Affairs
- Preceded by: Md. Didar Ahmed

Personal details
- Born: Bangladesh
- Education: Police Training Bangladesh Police Academy
- Awards: Bangladesh Police Medal (Bravery)
- Police career
- Allegiance: Bangladesh
- Branch: Bangladesh Police
- Status: Retired
- Rank: Additional IGP

Devdas Bhattacharya is a Bangladeshi police officer who served as additional inspector general (additional IGP) of the Bangladesh Police and the chief of the Bangladesh Railway Police. He is the former deputy inspector general (DIG) of the Mymensingh Range and the Rangpur Range of the Bangladesh Police.

== Career ==
Bhattacharya served in the Criminal Investigation Department in 2001. During the 2001 to 2006 Bangladesh Nationalist Party rule, the government discriminated against police officers from Faridpur District, Gopalganj District, and religious minority communities, as they were viewed as being loyal to the opposition Awami League. Bhattacharya, as a Hindu, was denied promotion three times and posted to the Police Training Centre, Khulna. He was afterward posted to the Criminal Investigation Department. He was then posted to the Range Reserve Force (RRF), Sylhet.

Bhattacharya was the superintendent of police of Barisal District in October 2011.

Bhattacharya was the superintendent of police of Bandarban District in 2014. He inaugurated a school by the JAAGO Foundation along with Brigadier General Nakib Ahmed Chowdhury and Bohmong King U Chaw Prue Choudhury. He announced that the police have implemented the government decision to impose restrictions on the movement of foreigners in Bandarban District.

In June 2016, Bhattacharya was the additional commissioner (crime and operation) of the Chittagong Metropolitan Police. He supervised the investigation into the murder of Mahmuda Khanam Mitu, wife of Babul Akter, superintendent of police, after she was killed in Chittagong.

He led the drive in February 2018 to arrest Masukur Rahman Mashuk, organizing secretary of the Bangladesh Nationalist Party. He detained a Bangladesh Jatiotabadi Chatra Dal, the student front of the Bangladesh Nationalist Party, in March from the premises of the Jatiya Press Club. In July 2018, Bhattacharya was the additional commissioner of Dhaka Metropolitan Police. He saw the arrest of nine fake members of the Detective Branch. His team arrested a leader of the 2018 Bangladesh quota reform movement. A man, Aslam, died in the custody of the Detective Branch under his command.

In September 2020, Bhattacharya was the deputy inspector general of the Rangpur Range. The Upazila Nirbahi Officer Wahida Khanam of Ghoraghat Upazila was attacked, and Bhattacharya commanded the police force in the region that investigated the incident.

In April 2022, Bhattacharya submitted his investigation of Detective Branch officers who had been accused of filing a false case over forged currency against hoteliers in Dhaka in November 2016. He was the additional commissioner of the Detective Branch at the time. The first police report Additional Deputy Commissioner Mohammad Shahed Miah of Dhaka Metropolitan Police in charge of the cantonment zone had submitted the report in favor of the accused. The Detective Branch mentioned they detained the two hoteliers from the Fakirapool kitchen market with fake currency, but CCTV footage showed they were detained from their hotel. In July 2022, Bhattacharya was made the deputy inspector general of Mymensingh Range, and Abdul Alim Mahmud replaced him as deputy inspector general of Rangpur Range.

Bhattacharya was forcibly retired in September 2024.
