= Md Tofazzel Hossain Miah =

Bangladeshi civil servant

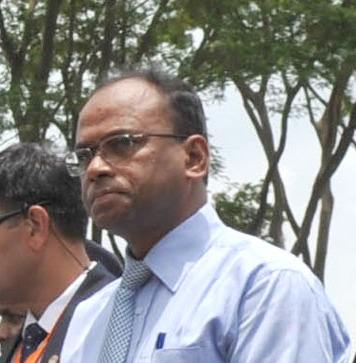
- Miah in 2015

Principal Secretary to the Prime Minister
- In office 14 December 2022 – 7 August 2024
- Prime Minister: Sheikh Hasina
- Preceded by: Ahmad Kaikaus
- Succeeded by: Md. Siraj Uddin Miah

Personal details
- Born: July 5, 1964 (age 62) Pirojpur, East Pakistan, Pakistan
- Education: University of Dhaka; BRAC University

Md Tofazzel Hossain Miah is a Bangladeshi retired civil servant who served as principal secretary of the prime minister. He also served as PS-1 to Prime Minister of Bangladesh Sheikh Hasina and senior secretary, Prime Minister's Office, Bangladesh. On 7 August 2024, his appointment has been cancelled.

== Early life ==
Miah completed his undergraduate and graduate studies in English literature from the University of Dhaka. He completed his post graduate studies from BRAC University.

== Career ==
Miah joined the Bangladesh Civil Service in 1991 as an assistant commissioner. He served as the assistant commissioner in Bagerhat Sadar Upazila. He had served as the upazila nirbahi officer in Narsingdi District.

Miah is the former district magistrate of Comilla District and Panchagarh District. He served as the additional deputy commissioner in Sylhet District. He served as deputy commissioner of Dhaka District.

Miah was appointed personal secretary to Prime Minister Sheikh Hasina on 25 January 2018.

On 20 February 2020, Miah was appointed director of Grameen Bank.

Miah was appointed secretary of the Prime Minister's Office in January 2021. On 11 March 2021, Miah was appointed non executive director of British American Tobacco Bangladesh. Mian was promoted to senior secretary on 29 December 2021. He is a director of Hotels International Limited. He is a director of Titas Gas. He is a director of Bangladesh Infrastructure Finance Fund Limited.

In June 2022, Miah signed an agreement with Major General Abul Kalam Mohammad Ziaur Rahman of Bangladesh Export Processing Zone Authority on behalf of the Prime Ministers' office. He presided Annual Performance Agreement of the seven organs under the Prime Minister's Office. He is a director of Infrastructure Development Company. He described the economic growth engine of Bangladesh as the private industry.

After the fall of the Sheikh Hasina led Awami League government, a murder case was filed against Miah by Bangladesh Nationalist Party politician Mohammad Zaman Hossain Khan over the death of a protestor in July 2024.
