= Syed Abdal Ahmed =

Sayed Abdal Ahmed
- সৈয়দ আবদাল আহমদ
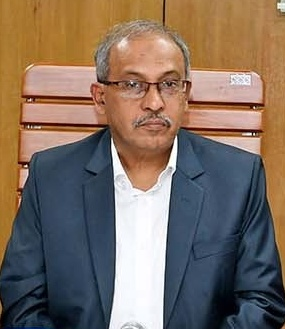
- Ahmed in 2026
- Born: December 28, 1962 (age 63)
- Citizenship: Bangladesh
- Education: Jahangirnagar University
- Occupation: Journalist
- Organization: Press Information Department
- Known for: Principal Information Officer (PIO) of Press Information Department

Sayed Abdal Ahmed (born 28 December 1962) is a Bangladeshi journalist, former general secretary of Jatiya Press Club, and Principal Information Officer (PIO) of Press Information Department. He was the executive editor of Amar Desh. He served in Media Reform Commission of Muhammad Yunus-led Interim government.

== Early life ==
He was born on 28 November 1962 in Nasirpur village, Nasirnagar Upazila, Brahmanbaria District. He studied at Shaistaganj High School and Brindaban Government College. He obtained both his bachelor's and master's degrees in chemistry from Jahangirnagar University. He was the campus correspondent of Dainik Bangla. He was the General Secretary of Jahangirnagar University Journalists' Association from 1984 to 1985.

== Career ==
Ahmed has worked in journalism and media leadership roles in Bangladesh. He was deputy press secretary of former Prime Minister and chairperson of Bangladesh Nationalist Party (BNP), Khaleda Zia from 1992 to 1996. He had worked at Bangladesh Sangbad Sangstha, The Daily Dinkal, Janakantha and weekly Bichitra. He is a member of Bangla Academy.

He has served as executive editor of Daily Amar Desh. He was also elected as general secretary of Jatiya Press Club twice, from 2011 to 2012 and from 2013 to 2014. He edits Tuntuni, a Children's monthly magazine. After the fall of Sheikh Hasina-led Awami League government, he was appointed a member of media reform commission of Yunus Ministry led by Dr Muhammad Yunus. The commission submitted its report in March 2025 to Chief Advisor Muhammad Yunus.

=== Appointment as PIO of PID ===
On 26 April 2026, Ministry of Public Administration appointed him as Principal Information Officer (PIO) of Press Information Department on a contractual basis.

== Awards and recognition ==
In 2025, Jahangirnagar University Journalists' Association (JUJA) honored him for his contribution to investigative journalism.
