= Deputy commissioner (Bangladesh) =

Chief administrative and revenue officer of a district

Deputy Commissioner
- জেলা প্রশাসক ও জেলা ম্যাজিস্ট্রেট
- Emblem of Bangladesh Administrative Service
- Government of Bangladesh
- Type: Administrator
- Status: Deputy Secretary
- Abbreviation: DC
- Member of: Bangladesh Administrative Service; Bangladesh Civil Service
- Reports to: Ministry of Public Administration; Divisional Commissioner
- Appointer: Ministry of Public Administration
- Term length: 3 years
- Formation: 1772; 254 years ago
- Deputy: Additional Deputy Commissioner; Additional District Magistrate
- Salary: ৳108300 (US$880); per month; ৳1299600 (US$11,000); annually (incl. allowances)

Deputy Commissioner (popularly abbreviated to DC) or District Magistrate is the chief administrative and revenue officer of a district in Bangladesh. A district is an administrative sub-unit of a division. According to the Code of Criminal Procedure of Bangladesh, the government shall appoint as many persons as it thinks fit to be Executive Magistrates and shall appoint one of them to be the District Magistrate.

The term District Magistrate is used in the Criminal procedure code to denote the principal executive magistrate of the district. However, after 1960, the Deputy Commissioner term came to prominence throughout the country. During the early year, before the Bangladesh era, the deputy commissioner's office used to be concerned with internal security and revenue administration. Over time, however, the office has become increasingly occupied with the general welfare of the people in the district. The Deputy Commissioner is a representative of the Government in the field of law and order, land administration, disaster management and general and local elections. The Deputy Commissioner works under the general guidance and supervision of the Divisional Commissioner. They are under the administrative control of the Cabinet Division although their posting and transfer are made by the Ministry of Public Administration. The Deputy commissioners are appointed from the administrative cadre of Bangladesh Civil Service, which is known as the Bangladesh Administrative Service.
