= Bangladesh Civil Service =

Civil Service in Bangladesh

Bangladesh Civil Service (BCS) is the civil service of Bangladesh. Civil service in the Indian subcontinent originated from the Imperial Civil Service, which was the elite higher civil service of the British Empire in India during British rule, in the period between 1858 and 1947. After the partition of 1947, East Bengal became a province of Pakistan, and the successor to the Imperial Civil Service in Pakistan was Central Superior Services. After the independence of Bangladesh in 1971, it became known as the Bangladesh Civil Service by an ordinance from the then President Sheikh Mujibur Rahman.

Bangladesh Public Service Commission (BPSC) is the main policy-setting and recruitment body of BCS. BCS has 26 cadres. In Bangladesh's parliamentary democracy, elected representatives, known as ministers, are ultimately responsible for running the administration. But the handful of ministers cannot be expected to deal personally with the manifold problems of modern administration. Thus, ministers set the policy, and civil servants implement it.

== History ==
The civil bureaucracy is a colonial legacy in this part of the world. The British used to rule the native population through Indian Civil Service (ICS) and most of the officers in ICS were British themselves. It was in the early 20th century that the Indians also started competing against the British and many Indians eventually made it to the ICS. With the partition of India in 1947, the term Central Superior Services was used in Pakistan and the concept of All-Pakistan Services continued. After the independence of Bangladesh in 1971, it became known as the Bangladesh Civil Service by an ordinance from the then President Sheikh Mujibur Rahman.

== Formation of the Commission ==
Bangladesh Public Service Commission is a constitutional body established primarily by the recruited persons for various services and posts in the government. It is also involved in decision processes relating to other service matters such as promotion, posting, transfer, discipline, and appeal of the government servants. The main purpose of constituting such a body, designated in most countries of British heritage as a 'civil' or 'public' service commission, is to ensure that all decisions relating to recruitment and other service matters are made consistent with the principles of merit and equity. In Bangladesh, this body is presently designated as the Bangladesh Public Service Commission (BPSC).

A commission called Public Service Commission was first established in India in 1926, when it was entrusted with functions almost similar to those of its British counterpart in London, particularly in matters of recruitment of public servants of the central government of British India. Similar provincial-level commissions were subsequently established, including the Bengal Public Service Commission in 1937, following the formation of responsible governments in the provinces in pursuance of the Government of India Act (1919), and thereafter in the Government of India Act, 1935. After the partition of India in 1947, replicas of the Public Service Commission in British India were established in Pakistan at both the central and provincial levels. Hence, a body designated as Public Service Commission, Eastern Pakistan (renamed later East Pakistan Public Service Commission) came into being in East Bengal (later named East Pakistan) in August 1947. After the emergence of Bangladesh two separate commissions, namely the Public Service Commission (First), and the Public Service Commission (Second), were initially established in May 1972 under provisions made in President's Order No. 34 of 1972. But to give effect to the provisions on public service commissions in the constitution adopted in November 1972, a fresh Presidential Order (President's Order No. 25 of 1973) was promulgated in March 1973 which in effect formally regularized the establishment of the two commissions in existence since May 1972. However, in November 1977 the government promulgated another ordinance to establish a single commission in place of the existing two commissions, which, in effect, came into being on 22 December 1977 and was designated as Bangladesh Public Service Commission.

== Constitutional structure ==
The Constitution of Bangladesh provides the fundamental law to construct The Bangladesh Public Service Commission (BPSC), a quasi-judicial body that works under the provisions of the Article 137 – 141 of the Constitution of Bangladesh and certain other rules and regulations made by the government from time to time. Bangladeshi Nationals are recruited through the provisions of the constitution from article 133 to 136 and article 29.

== Governance ==
=== Head ===
The highest-ranking civil servant is the Chief of the Cabinet Secretariat of the People's Republic of Bangladesh, who is also the Cabinet Secretary. He is ex-officio Chairman of the Superior Selection Board and head of all civil services under the Rules of Business of the Government of Bangladesh. He also holds the 12th position in the Table of precedence for the People's Republic of Bangladesh Warrant of Precedence of Bangladesh. Cabinet Secretary is appointed from Bangladesh Civil Service (Administration) Cadre, known as Bangladesh Administrative Service.

Bangladesh Administrative Service

Present Cabinet Secretary of the Republic is Mr. Nasimul Gani. He is the 27th Cabinet Secretary to the government of Bangladesh.

The position holder is accountable for ensuring that the Civil Service is equipped with the skills and capability to meet the everyday challenges it faces and that civil servants work in a fair and decent environment.

| Sl | Name | Year |
|---|---|---|
| 1 | Hossain Toufique Imam | 1971 to 1975 |
| 2 | Shafiul Azam | 1975 to 1976 |
| 3 | Abdul Momen Khan | 1976 to 1977 |
| 4 | M. Keramat Ali | 1977 to 1982 |
| 5 | Mohammad Mahbubuzzaman | 1982 to 1986 |
| 6 | Md. Mujibul Hoque | 1986 to 1989 |
| 7 | M. K. Anwar | 1990 to 1991 |
| 8 | Md. Siddiqur Rahman | 1991 to 1992 |
| 9 | M. Ayubur Rahman | 1992 to 1996 |
| 10 | Syed Ahmed | 1996 to 1997 |
| 11 | Ataul Haque | 1997 to 1998 |
| 12 | Qazi Shamsul Alam | 1998 to 2001 |
| 13 | Dr. Akbar Ali Khan | 2001 to 2002 |
| 14 | Dr. Kamal Uddin Siddique | 2002 to 2002 |
| 15 | Dr. Saadat Husain | 2002 to 2005 |
| 16 | A S M Abdul Halim | 2005 to 2006 |
| 17 | Md. Abu Solaiman Chowdhury | 2006 to 2006 |
| 18 | Ali Imam Majumder | 2006 to 2008 |
| 19 | Md Abdul Aziz | 2008 to 2011 |
| 20 | M Musharraf Hossain Bhuiyan | 2011 to 2015 |
| 21 | Mohammad Shafiul Alam | 2015 to 2019 |
| 22 | Khandker Anwarul Islam | 2019 to 2022 |
| 23 | Kabir Bin Anwar | 2022 to 2023 |
| 24 | Md. Mahbub Hossain | 2023 to 2024 |
| 25 | Sheikh Abdur Rashid | 2024 to Present |

== Cadre compositions ==
- Existing Cadres: 26
  - General Cadres: 10
  - Professional Cadres: 12
  - Cadres with Both General & Professional Posts: 4
- Cadres no longer exist: 6
  - Abolished Cadres: 2 (Judicial in 2007, Telecommunications in 2008)
  - Cadres Merged into Administration Cadre: 4 (Secretariat in 1992, Social Welfare, Economic in 2018, Trade)

There are two types of cadres in Bangladesh Civil Service: General Cadres and Professional/Technical/Research Cadres.

General Administrative cadres

1. BCS (Foreign Affairs)
2. BCS (Police)
3. BCS (Administration)
4. BCS (Customs & Excise)
5. BCS (Audit & Accounts)
6. BCS (Taxation)
7. BCS (Ansar)
8. BCS (Forest)
9. BCS (Family Planning)
10. BCS (Postal)
11. BCS (Railway Transportation & Commercial)

Professional/Technical cadres

1. BCS (General Education)
2. BCS (Technical Education)
3. BCS (Public Health Engineering)
4. BCS (Public Works)
5. BCS (Railway Engineering)
6. BCS (Roads & Highways)
7. BCS (Health)
8. BCS (Agriculture)
9. BCS (Fisheries)
10. BCS (Livestock)
11. BCS (Statistics)

Cadres with both general and professional posts

1. BCS (Food)
2. BCS (Trade)
3. BCS (Information)
4. BCS (Co-operative)

| Cadre | Entry Post (Grade - 9) |
|---|---|
| Foreign Affairs | Assistant Secretary |
| Administration | Assistant Commissioner (in field administration); Assistant Secretary (in Secretariat) |
| Audit & Accounts | Assistant Accountant General (Training Academy); Assistant Director (Audit Directorate); Assistant Chief Accounts and Finance Officer / Assistant Controller General Of Accounts (Civil Accounts Department); Assistant Controller General Defence Finance / Assistant Finance Controller (Defence Finance Department); Assistant Financial Advisor and Chief Accounts Officer (Railway Accounts Department) |
| Police | Assistant Superintendent of Police (in district) / Assistant Commissioner of Police (in the metropolitan area) |
| Ansar | Assistant District Commandant/Assistant Director |
| Customs & Excise | Assistant Collectors of Customs/Assistant Commissioner of Excise |
| Taxation | Assistant Commissioner of Taxes |
| Postal | Assistant Postmaster General |
| Family Planning | Upazila Family Planning Officer |
| Public Works | Assistant Engineer |
| Public Health Engineering | Assistant Engineer |
| Forest | Assistant Conservator of Forest |
| Health | Assistant Surgeon / Medical Officer |
| Railway Engineering | Assistant Engineer |
| Livestock | Veterinary Surgeon / Scientific Officer / Poultry Development Officer |
| Fisheries | Upazila Fisheries Officer |
| Statistics | Statistical Officer |
| General Education | Lecturer |
| Technical Education | Lecturer |
| Information Radio, Technical | Assistant Radio Engineer (Note: This cadre has both general and technical category posts) |
| Agriculture | Agricultural Extension Officer (DAE); Scientific Officer (SRDI); Assistant Director(DAM) |
| Food (General) | Assistant Controller of Food |
| Food (Technical) | Assistant Maintenance Engineer |
| Engineer | Assistant Engineer / Equivalent Posts |
| Information General | Assistant Controller (News) / Assistant Director / Information Officer |

- A substantive changes happened recently: The Government of the People's Republic of Bangladesh with Gazette Notification no. SRO No. 355 Act/2018, 13 November 2018 has merged two cadres of the civil administration-Administration and Economic (Bangladesh Gazette, 13 November 2018, Govt. of the People's Republic of Bangladesh). Now, all positions and manpower of the Economic cadre will belong to that of the Administration cadre. The said reformation has happened to ensure a more dynamic, coordinated and people-friendly administrative system.

== Examination system ==
BCS Examination is the top most competitive job examination in Bangladesh. On an average, 350,000 to 425,000 candidates apply every year and the percentage of candidates appearing is more than 90%. Aspirants must complete a three-stage process, with a final success rate of about 2% for all cadres and 0.5% for general cadres, although it varies from years to years exam.

== See also ==
- Executive Magistrate of Bangladesh
