= Mozammel Haque (police officer) =

Police official in Bangladesh

Md. Mozammel Haque
- মো. মোজাম্মেল হক

Police Commissioner of Khulna Metropolitan Police
- In office 16 July 2023 – 27 August 2024
- Appointed by: Minister of Home Affairs
- Preceded by: Md. Masudur Rahman
- Succeeded by: Md. Zulfikar Ali Haider

Personal details
- Born: January 15, 1968 (age 58) Chatmohar Upazila, Pabna District, Bangladesh
- Spouse: Sultana Haque
- Children: 1 son, 2 daughters
- Awards: Bangladesh Police Medal (BPM) (Bravery & Service); President Police Medal (PPM) (Bravery & Service)
- Police career
- Allegiance: Bangladesh
- Branch: Bangladesh Police
- Service years: 1999–2024
- Status: Retired
- Rank: DIG

Md Mozammel Haque (Bengali: মো. মোজাম্মেল হক; born 15 January 1968, Chatmohar Upazila, Pabna District) is a retired Bangladeshi police officer. He was deputy inspector general of the Bangladesh Police and commissioner of Khulna Metropolitan Police.

== Career ==
Haque joined the Bangladesh Civil Service on 30 August 1994 as a veterinary surgeon or livestock cadre. He worked in that position for four years before joining the police service as an assistant superintendent of police on 25 January 1999. On 29 March 2001, he was appointed the assistant superintendent of police of Panchagar Circle.

Haque was appointed senior assistant superintendent of police of Rajshahi Sadar Circle. On August 1, 2005, he was appointed additional superintendent of police of Natore District Police. He went on to serve in Comilla District, Dhaka District, and Rajshahi District.

In 2008, Haque was deployed in the United Nations Mission in Sudan.

Haque served as the superintendent of police of Joypurhat District from 24 September 2010, and of Bogra District from 27 March 2012. He later served as the superintendent of police of Naogaon District. He was awarded the Presidential Police Medal. On 12 August 2017, he was appointed the deputy commissioner of crime of Dhaka Metropolitan Police. On 1 January 2018, he was posted to the headquarters of the Rapid Action Battalion.

Haque served as the commanding officer of the Rapid Action Battalion-13. He won the Bangladesh Police Medal for bravery in 2019 for leading raids against Islamist militants from Prime Minister Sheikh Hasina. He was appointed commanding officer of the Rapid Action Battalion-4 on 18 June 2019.

On 16 October 2022, Haque was appointed chief of the Highway Police, an additional inspector general of police. He had been serving as the commanding officer of Rapid Action Battalion-4.

In July 2023, Haque was appointed commissioner of Khulna Metropolitan Police. He replaced Md. Masudur Rahman Bhuyain, who had been appointed chief of the Highway Police. This was part of a major reshuffle in the police by the government. The reshuffle was taking place before the new parliamentary elections in Bangladesh.

Haque was sent to forced retirement after the fall of the Sheikh Hasina-led Awami League government in August 2024.

== Personal life ==
Haque is married to Sultana Haque. They have a son and two daughters.
