= Bangladesh Judicial Service Association =

Professional association in Bangladesh

- বাংলাদেশ জুডিসিয়াল সার্ভিস এসোসিয়েশন
- Location: House No - 7, Road No - 8, Bhashashoinik Gaziul Hoque Road, Dhanmondi Residential Area, Dhaka, Bangladesh
- President: Md. Amirul Islam
- Secretary General: Mohammad Majharul Islam
- Website: www.bjsa.org.bd

Bangladesh Judicial Service Association (BJSA) (Bengali: বাংলাদেশ জুডিসিয়াল সার্ভিস এসোসিয়েশন (বিজেএসএ) is a professional association of judges and Magistrates of Bangladesh.

== History ==
The 'East Pakistan Civil Service (Judicial) Association' began on 13 October 1947 with a constitution adopted. Later, after the independence of Bangladesh, the Judicial Cadre was incorporated in the Bangladesh Civil Service. The name of the organization was changed to 'Bangladesh Civil Service (Judicial) Association'. At the Annual General Meeting of the members of the organization held on 28 December 1990, the new constitution was formulated and adopted by repealing the previous one. In the Secretary, Ministry of Finance v Masdar Hossain case, the Appellate Division of Supreme Court of Bangladesh directed to formulate 'Bangladesh Judicial Service' as per mandate of Constitution of Bangladesh. The name of the organization was changed to the Bangladesh Judicial Service Association at the annual general meeting held in 2002.

== Aims and Objectives ==
As a non-political and welfare organization, the functioning of this Association is governed by the following aims and objectives:

1. To promote mutual cooperation, sympathy and solidarity among members of the Association and to inspire members to perform responsibilities and duties with patriotism, dutifulness, honesty, neutrality and intentness for welfare of nations in order to uphold the august traditions and standards of the judiciary.
2. To take all the steps and measures necessary to establish and preserve all the demands related to the legal and equitable rights of the members, such as the structure of the job, salary, status etc.
3. Establish funds, acquire immovable and immovable property for the benefit of the organization and the welfare of the members.
4. To undertake national activities such as meetings, conferences and symposiums for the benefit of the organization.
5. Establish and expand relations with national and international organizations with the permission of the government for the development of justice and judicial administration, and
6. To take all directly and indirectly helpful activities to achieve the stated goals and objectives.

== See also ==
- Bangladesh Administrative Service Association
- Bangladesh Police Service Association
