= Char Development and Settlement Project =

Bangladesh government project

- Formation: 1994
- Headquarters: Dhaka, Bangladesh
- Region served: Bangladesh
- Official language: Bengali
- Website: cdsp.org.bd

Char Development and Settlement Project (Bengali: চর উন্নয়ন ও বসতি স্থাপন প্রকল্প) is a Bangladesh government project that seeks to improve the livelihoods of people living in recently emerged chars (river islands).

== History ==
Bangladesh is crisscrossed by rivers; prominent among them are Padma River, Meghna River and Jamuna River. The rivers create islands and new land by depositing sediments. These new lands became lawless areas with little government presence and dominated by criminals. The government created the Land Reclamation Project in 1979, which continued to function till 1991, to develop these char lands and improve the livelihood of the people living there. Char Development and Settlement Project was created as a successor to that project in 1994.

Char Development and Settlement Project Phase one was implemented from 1994 to 1999. After the project was completed, the Char Development and Settlement Project was developed into a government project involving multiple agencies. Char Development and Settlement Project was composed of Bangladesh Water Development Board, Department of Agricultural Extension, Department of Public Health Engineering, Forest Department, Ministry of Land, and Local Government Engineering Department. The project received financial support from the Government of Bangladesh and the Government of Netherlands for the first three phases of the project. The project is developing sandy river islands into lush green farmlands.

Char Development and Settlement Project Phase four received financial support from the International Fund for Agricultural Development of the United Nations. The fourth phase of the project provided homes 155,000 people from 28,000 households living in chars. In July 2019, the fifth phase of the project and is projected to be completed in June 2022. Char Development and Settlement Project continues providing support to phase one to four project areas. Bangladesh Planning Commission questioned the reported costs of the project. The fourth phase, titled Char Development and Settlement Project Bridging Project, was approved on 24 July 2020 by the Executive Committee of the National Economic Council. The government allocated 263 billion taka for the project.
