= Md. Siraj Uddin Miah =

Bangladeshi civil servant and writer

- মোঃ সিরাজ উদ্দিন মিয়া
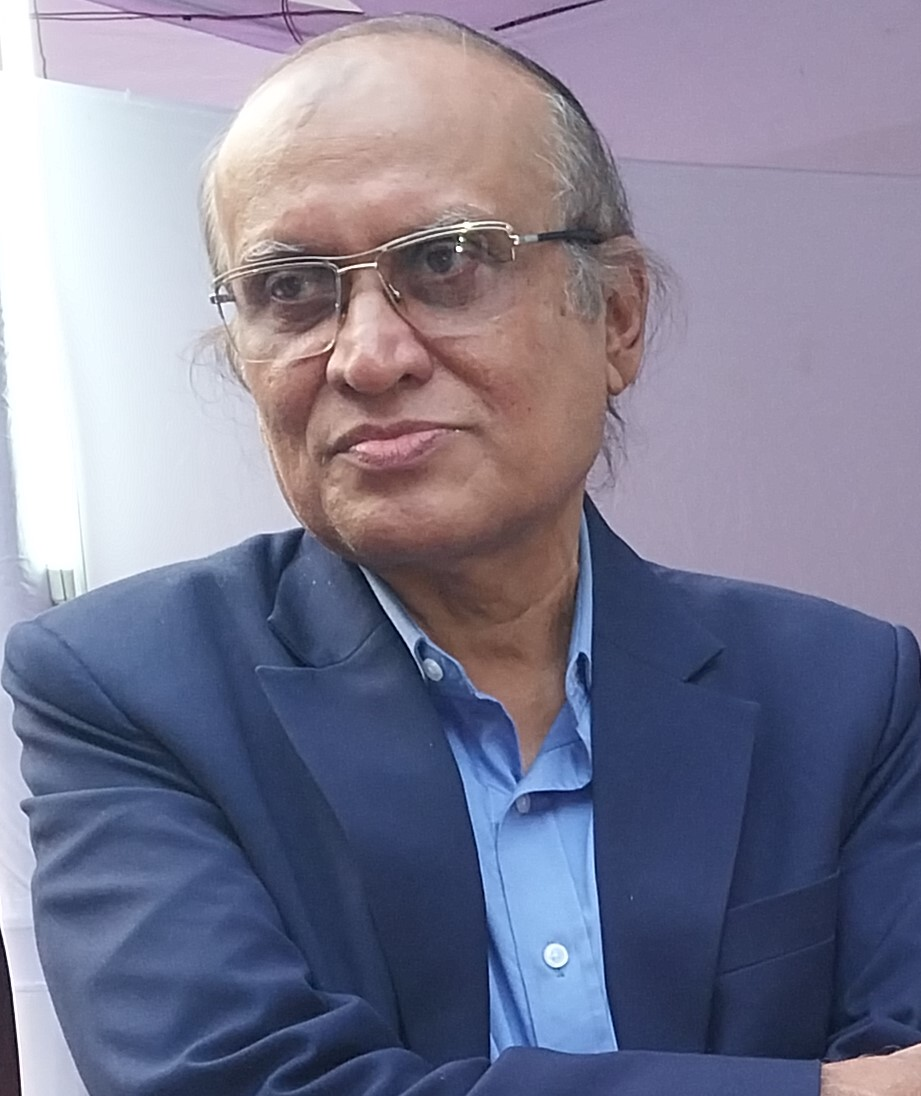
- Miah in 2024

Principal Secretary to the Chief Adviser
- In office 2 October 2024 – 17 February 2026
- President: Mohammed Shahabuddin
- Prime Minister: Muhammad Yunus (Chief Adviser)
- Preceded by: Md Tofazzel Hossain Miah
- Succeeded by: A. B. M. Abdus Sattar

26th Cabinet Secretary of Bangladesh
- In office 14 February 2026 – 17 February 2026
- President: Mohammed Shahabuddin
- Prime Minister: Muhammad Yunus (Chief Adviser)
- Preceded by: Sheikh Abdur Rashid
- Succeeded by: Nasimul Gani

Personal details
- Born: Bangladesh
- Education: University of Dhaka; University of Wales
- Profession: Civil Servant; Writer

Md. Siraj Uddin Miah, also known as Siraj Uddin Sathi, is Bangladeshi civil servant and 26th Cabinet Secretary of Bangladesh. Prior to that, he served as Principal secretary to the Chief Adviser of Bangladesh Muhammad Yunus.

== Early life ==
Miah did his bachelor's degree and masters in economics at the University of Chittagong in 1977 and 1979 respectively. He completed a bachelors of law from the University of Chittagong in 1980. He has a second masters from the University of Wales in Transport Economics.

== Career ==
In 2016, Miah's book Grameen Bank: The Struggle of Dr. Muhammad Yunus was published by Adorn Publication.

Miah translated The Bangladesh Military Coup and the CIA Link book by B. Z. Khasru to Bengali in 2023. The book described Sheikh Mujibur Rahman as the leader of the masses quoting Archer Kent Blood.

In May 2024, Miah organized the Farakka Long March to India to protest the Farakka Dam. Miah was appointed Principal secretary to the Chief Adviser of Bangladesh Dr. Muhammad Yunus in October 2024. He imposed restrictions on foreign trips by civil servants. He was appointed chairman of the committee formed to recommend dearness allowance for public service employees.

== Bibliography ==
- Jorimon and Others of Beltoil Village Edited by Dr Muhammad Yunus, 1981.
- Muktijudhey Narsingdi: Kichu Smritee Kichu Kotha, 2009.
- Pabittra Makka Nagarir Iteekatha, 2011.
- Manusher Prithibi, 2012.
- Dash Bidroher Kotha (A Book on slave rebellion), 2013.
- Quraner Kotha O Kahini (sayings of Al-Quran), 2014.
- Shitolakkhyar Lash, 2015.
- Grameen Bank: The Struggle of Dr Muhammad Yunus, 2016.
