= Upazila Nirbahi Officer =

Bangladeshi government office

- উপজেলা নির্বাহী অফিসার
- Emblem of Bangladesh Administrative Service
- Government of Bangladesh
- Type: Chief Executive Officer
- Status: Senior Assistant Secretary
- Abbreviation: UNO
- Member of: Bangladesh Administrative Service; Bangladesh Civil Service
- Reports to: Prime Minister of Bangladesh; Ministry of Public Administration
- Appointer: Prime Minister on the advice of the Minister of Public Administration
- Term length: 4 years
- Formation: 1988; 38 years ago
- Salary: ৳67100 (US$550) per month ৳805200 (US$6,600) annually (incl. allowances)

An Upazila Nirbahi Officer (Note: Bengali: উপজেলা নির্বাহী অফিসার, romanized: Upôjela Nirbahi Ôphisar, pronounced [ˈupoˌdʒelaˑ ˈniɾbaɦi ˈɔfisaɾ]) (UNO) is the chief executive officer of an upazila (subdistrict) and a mid-level officer of the Bangladesh Civil Service (administration cadre), known as Bangladesh Administrative Service. A senior assistant secretary is usually assigned to this post.

UNO works as chief executive officer of an upazila parishad for executing all decisions taken by the upazila parishad and ensuring financial disciplines of the funds of upazila parishad and representative of the government of Bangladesh in the upazila level for performing retained activities to the government of Bangladesh, non-transferred and controlling activities.

== History ==
The role of the UNO was created in accordance with a decision by the military regime of Lieutenant General Hussain Muhammad Ershad. In 1982, the Ershad government constituted a committee for administrative reorganization and reform. One of the committee's major recommendations was to create a representative body called upazila porishod (council) under a directly elected chair. The government created the position of thana nirbahi officer or TNO (thana executive officer) later establishing the post of upazila nirbhahi officer (UNO)—in each of the upazilas created from rural thanas except metropolitan areas where thanas retained administrative value.

About the same time, subdivisions were upgraded and converted into districts, responsibility for all development activities at the local level was transferred to the upazila porishads. it was also decided that the UNO should continue to chair the upazila porishads until an elected chair took office.

UNOs were normally posted from among the officers ranked as "senior assistant secretary" of the BCS Administration cadre.

== Charter of duties ==
As a CEO of upazila parishad

According to Upazila Parishad Manual and Upazila Parishad Act-1998 Upazila nirbahi officer is to perform following duties as a part of CEO and transferred dept. to parishad.

- Act as CEO of Upazila Parishad
- As a chief executive officer, UNO is liable to execute all the decisions of Upazila Parishad.
- Act as Project managers of development projects including engineering projects in nature like rural roads, bridges and other infrastructures.
- Assist and advice to chairman to perform his executive responsibilities
- Financial disciplines, budgeting and controlling expenditures of the Upazila Parishad
- Reporting any unusual matter of upazila parishad to ministries.
- Drawing and Disbursement Officer
- Human resource and development officer
- Monitoring and coordination of development activities
- Ensuring government interest in the council and calling of meeting etc.
- Coordinate of activities of all other departments whether transferred or non-transferred etc.

As a representative of government

UNO performs some retained and regulatory functions which have not been assigned to Upazila Parishad.

- Revenue Functions.
- Magisterial Functions (144 of CRPC and Mobile Court)
- Maintenance of public Order and Security.(Chairman of Upazila Law and Order Committee)
- State Secret Matters.
- Public examinations related affairs
- Inspection of all educational institutes
- Coordination of all training of Upazila
- Implementation of PDR act. 1913 for collecting government claims and demands
- Political and Confidential Functions.
- Election Matters (Assistant Returning Officer for conducting national election).
- Relief and Rehabilitation.
- Food controlling matters.
- Social Welfare.

== Name changes ==
Upon the abolition of the upazila system in the early 1990s, the 'Upazila Nirbahi Officer' post was abolished and changed to 'Thana Nirbahi Officer'. This system changed again in the late 1990s, reverting to 'Upazila Nirbahi Officer'.

== Appointment and regulations ==
Upazila nirbahi officers are appointed by Ministry of Public Administration through B.C.S Cabinet Division directly controls and supervises the activities of UNO. They are the top executive person in an upazila.

== See also ==
- Executive Magistrate of Bangladesh
