= Nasimul Gani =

Bangladesh government official

- নাসিমুল গণি
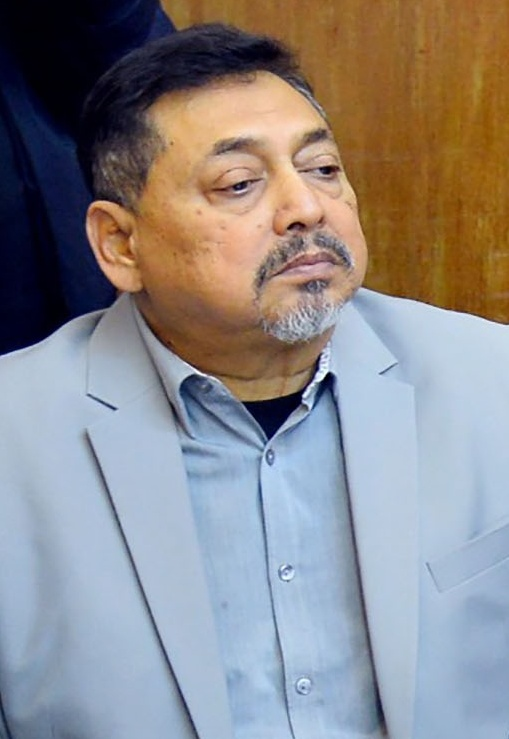
- Gani in 2025

27th Cabinet Secretary of Bangladesh
- Incumbent
- Assumed office 17 February 2026
- President: Mohammed Shahabuddin; Hafiz Uddin Ahmad (acting); Mirza Fakhrul Islam Alamgir
- Prime Minister: Tarique Rahman
- Preceded by: Md. Siraj Uddin Miah

Personal details
- Born: 8 March 1957 (age 69) Jessore District, East Pakistan (now Bangladesh)
- Education: University of Dhaka
- Profession: Civil Servant

Nasimul Ghani is the Cabinet Secretary of Bangladesh and heads the Cabinet Division. He previously served as secretary of the Public Department of former President Mohammed Shahabuddin. He is the former private secretary of the speaker of the parliament Jamiruddin Sircar.

== Career ==
Nasimul Gani passed SSC from Mirzapur Cadet College in 1973 and HSC in 1975. He earned his Honors degree in 1980 and Masters degree in 1981 from the Department of Economics, Dhaka University. Later, in 1982, he joined the Bangladesh Administrative Service.

In January 2007, Gani was transferred to the post of Director General of the National Institute of Population Research and Training from secretary to the President of Bangladesh.

Gani was the private secretary of Jamiruddin Sircar, Bangladesh Nationalist Party politician and speaker of the parliament. In 2009, he was the Director General of the National Institute of Population Research and Training. He was made an officer of special duty in 2009 after Awami League came to power along with M. A. Akmal Hossain Azad, secretary of the Ministry of Agriculture. He was sent to retirement on 29 May 2013.

Gani was appointed Secretary of the Public Department of President Mohammed Shahabuddin's Office on 18 August 2024 after the Sheikh Hasina-led Awami League government fell. At the same time four others were made contractual secretaries, Sheikh Abdur Rashid in the Secondary and Higher Education Division, Ehchanul Haque in Roads and Highways Department, Mohammad Abdul Momen in Public Security Division, and M. A. Akmal Hossain Azad in Ministry of Railway. Gazi replaced Wahidul Islam Khan who was terminated from his position.

Gani was appointed Senior Secretary of the Ministry of Home Affairs on 22 December 2024. He is the new president of Chowgacha Somity Dhaka.
