= Md Jahangir Alam (secretary) =

Md Jahangir Alam is the former secretary of the Public Security Division of the Ministry of Home Affairs. He was forced into retirement and detained after the fall of the Sheikh Hasina led Awami League government. He is a former secretary of the Ministry of Public Administration.

Alam was the secretary of the Election Commission Secretariat. He was the secretary of the Health Services Division in the Ministry of Health and Family Welfare.

== Career ==
Alam joined the 13th batch of the Bangladesh Civil Service in 1994 in the administrative branch. He was appointed as an Assistant Commissioner.

Alam was promoted to secretary of the Ministry of Public Administration in October 2022. He is a former additional secretary at the Public Security Division.

On 2 November 2022, Alam was appointed secretary of the Election Commission Secretariat while Shafiul Azim replaced him at the Election Commission. He was the secretary of the Election Commission during the 2024 Bangladeshi general election which was boycotted by a number of opposition parties including the Bangladesh Nationalist Party.

In October 2023, Alam was appointed secretary of the Health Service Division. In May 2024, Alam was appointed Secretary of the Public Security Division of the Ministry of Home Affairs.

After the fall of the Sheikh Hasina led Awami League government, Alam was removed from the post of Secretary of the Public Security Division and sent into retirement on 15 August 2024. After which ten criminal cases were filed against him. He was arrested by Detective Branch on 1 October from his home in Gulshan and confirmed by Muhammad Talebur Rahman, deputy commissioner of Dhaka Metropolitan Police, and Rezaul Karim Mallick, additional commissioner of Detective Branch. The police called him "architect of dummy elections". He was sent to jail by Arifur Rahman, Dhaka Metropolitan Magistrate, in a case filed over the death of a teenager during the Anti-discrimination Students Movement against Prime Minister Sheikh Hasina after a five-day remand. He had been sent on remand on the orders of Belal Hossain, Dhaka Metropolitan Magistrate, on 1 October. He was represented by Mohammad Yaar Khan and Morshed Hossain Shaheen. There are 176 accused in the case including former prime minister Sheikh Hasina and Minister of Home Affairs Asaduzzaman Khan Kamal.
