= Centre for Environmental and Geographic Information Services =

Government Agency of Bangladesh

Center for Environmental and Geographic Information Services (CEGIS)
- Formation: 2002
- Headquarters: Dhaka, Bangladesh
- Region served: Bangladesh
- Official language: Bengali
- Website: cegisbd.com

The Center for Environmental and Geographic Information Services is a government research center that is responsible for water system development and water capacity development and is located in Dhaka, Bangladesh.

== History ==
The Centre for Environmental and Geographic Information Services was established on 16 May 2002 as a public trust. Following the flooding in 1987 and 1988 the government of Bangladesh felt the need for a detailed plan to prevent flooding and body to implement it. Based on the Flood Action Plan, the government launched Environmental and Geographic Information System Support Project for Water Sector Planning (EGIS) in 1996 and EGIS-2 in 1997 which ended in 2002, both supported by the Government of Bangladesh and Government of the Netherlands. The government continued the policies of EGIS with the establishment of Centre for Environmental and Geographic Information Services. The center is under the Ministry of Water Resources. It developed Community-based Flood Information System which warned people in coastal areas through SMS. It is part of the Australian funded Bangladesh integrated water resources assessment project since 2011.
