= Press Information Department =

- Logo of the Press Information Department (PID)

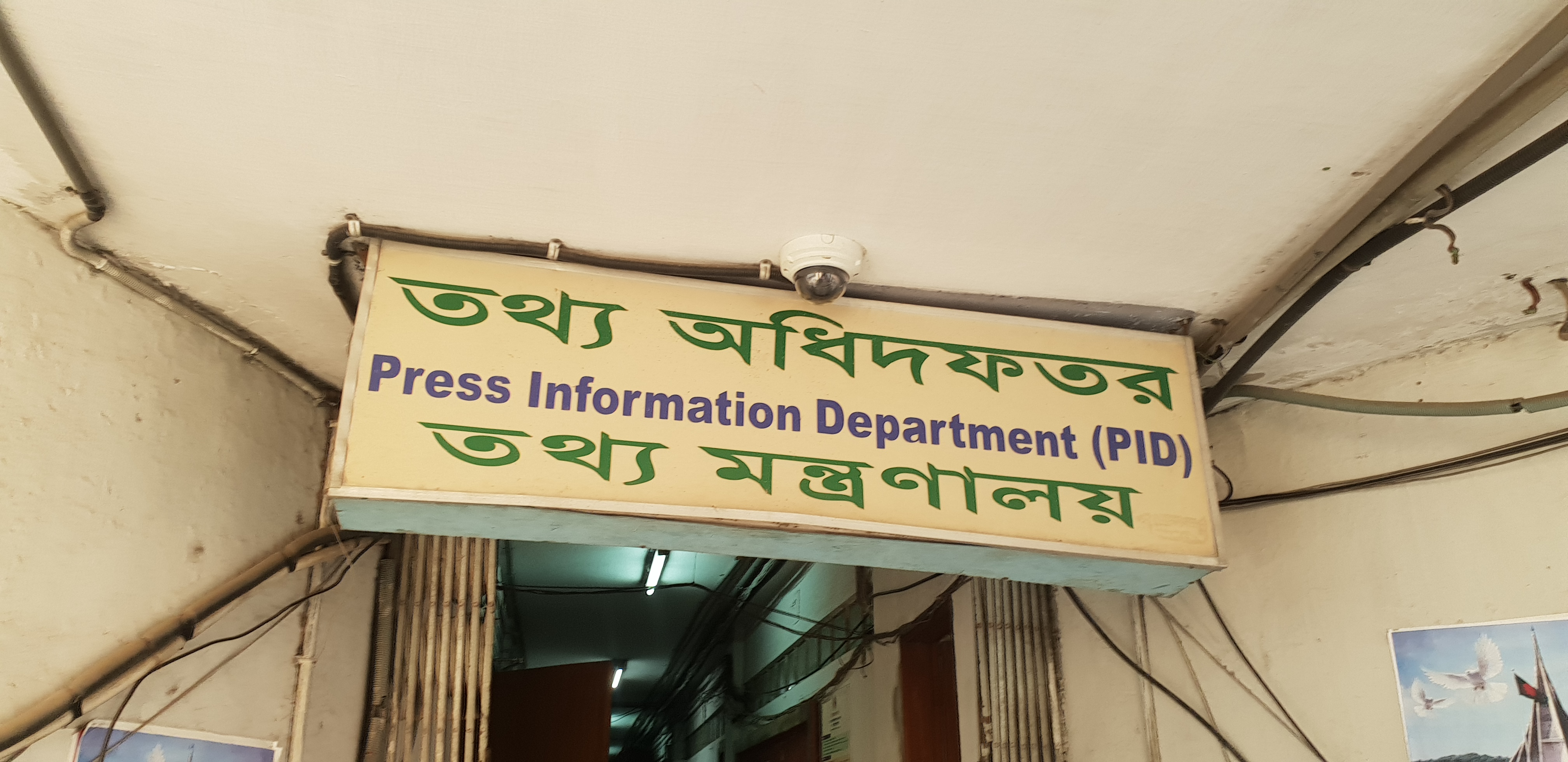
- Office of the Department of Information inside the Bangladesh Secretariat
- Abbreviation: PID
- Formation: 1973
- Headquarters: Dhaka, Bangladesh
- Region served: Bangladesh
- Official language: Bengali
- Leader: Syed Abdal Ahmed (CIO)
- Parent organization: Ministry of Information and Broadcasting
- Website: pressinform.gov.bd

Press Information Department or PID, is a government body responsible for disseminating government information to the media and a media regulatory organization. It is located in Dhaka, Bangladesh. It is under the Ministry of Information.

== History ==
In August 2014, the Press Information Department ordered the press to not use the term indigenous when referring to tribal communities in Bangladesh. In February 2017 Begum Kamrun Nahar became the Principal Information Officer of the Press Information Department. She was the first female head of the Press Information Department.

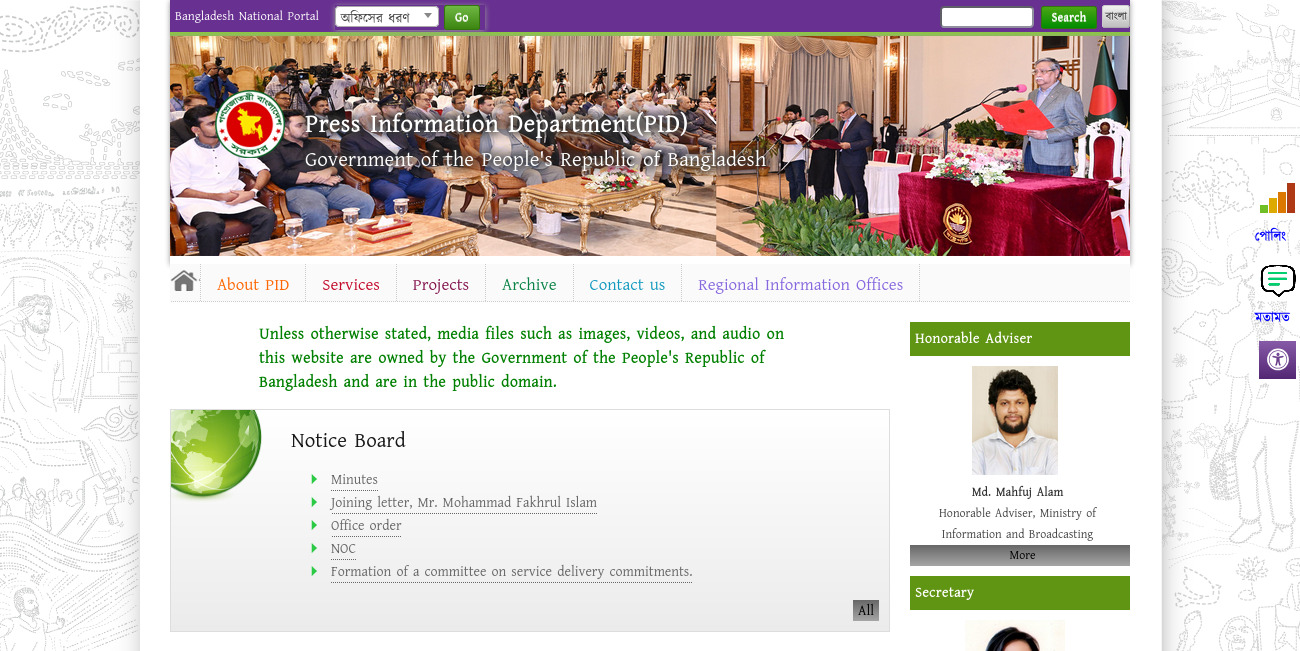
Press Information Department of Bangladesh: Her image and video are declared Public Domain on the official website. 2025

The Press Information Department ordered cable operators not to provide foreign channels that air commercials of local companies on 3 January 2017. On 9 November 2017 the government of Bangladesh announced that all news websites would have to register with Press Information Department. The Editor's Council asked the government to exempt online newspapers from registration. Government officials hold press conferences in the Press Information Department Conference Hall.

== Notable people ==
- Syed Abdal Ahmed - Bangladeshi journalist, former general secretary of the Jatiya Press Club, and the Chief Information Officer of the Press Information Department.
- Khaled Belal - Bangladeshi writer and journalist and former deputy chief information officer at PID
