= Ali Imam Majumder =

Retired Bangladeshi government official

- আলী ইমাম মজুমদার
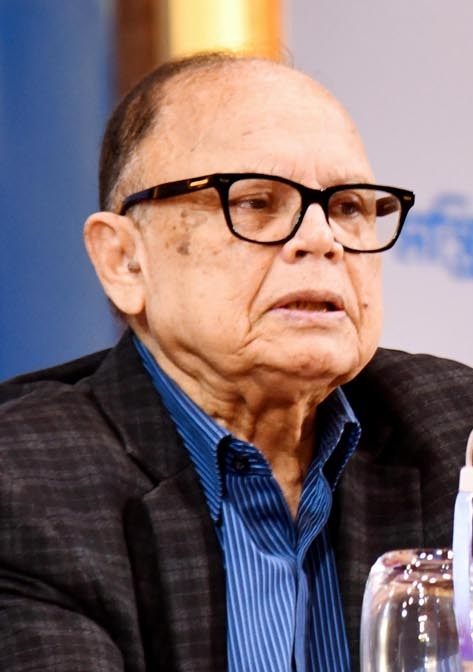
- Majumdar in 2025

Adviser for Food
- In office 10 November 2024 – 17 February 2026
- President: Mohammed Shahabuddin
- Chief Adviser: Muhammad Yunus
- Preceded by: Muhammad Yunus
- Succeeded by: Amin ur Rashid Yasin

Adviser for Land
- In office 20 January 2025 – 17 February 2026
- President: Mohammed Shahabuddin
- Chief Adviser: Muhammad Yunus
- Preceded by: A. F. Hassan Ariff
- Succeeded by: Mizanur Rahman Minu

Special Assistant to the Chief Adviser
- In office 12 August 2024 – 10 November 2024
- Chief Adviser: Muhammad Yunus

Personal details
- Born: 11 March 1950 (age 76) Tripura, India
- Education: University of Chittagong

Ali Imam Majumder is a former Bangladeshi civil servant. He was an adviser to the Interim government of Bangladesh. He is a former Bangladeshi government official who served as the cabinet secretary. He was the secretary general of Transparency International Bangladesh and an executive committee member of Citizens for Good Governance (SHUJAN).

== Early life ==
Majumder was born in 1950 in Tripura, India. He migrated to East Pakistan and settled in Comilla in 1962. His studies being disrupted by the 1971 Liberation War, graduated from University of Chittagong with a master's in mathematics in 1973.

== Career ==
Majumder joined the Bangladesh Civil Service on 11 February 1977 as an administration cadre.

Majumder served as a Union Council Officer and Subdivisional Officer in Kishoreganj and Gazipur. He then served as Additional District Commissioner (General), Noakhali (1981 - 1983) and as Senior Assistant Secretary (Police Wing) in the Ministry of Home Affairs (1983 - 1985) and then for a time as Civil Affairs Liaison Aide to President Ershad from 1985 to 1988. He then served as the district commissioner (DC) of Moulvibazar District 1988 - 1990, as Deputy Secretary (BSIC) in the Ministry of Industries 1990 - 1993, and as District Commissioner (DC) of Sylhet District, Gazipur District and Cox's Bazar District between 1993 and 1998.

In 2004, Majumder was the secretary of the Ministry of Labour and Employment.

On 31 October 2006, Majumder was appointed the principal secretary to the chief advisor of the caretaker government.

On 6 December 2006, he also became the cabinet secretary of Bangladesh.

In May 2007, he approved a proposal to raise the ranks of the heads of the three armed forced forces of Bangladesh. On 19 November 2007, his term was extended by one year. He reported that the proclamation of independence of Bangladesh document had gone missing from government custody. He also served as the chairman of Sonali Bank. He retired from the civil service on 28 November 2008.

In March 2015, Majumder was relieved of contempt charges by a court; related to a case against David Bergman.

On 27 October 2016, Majumder was elected to the trustee board of Transparency International Bangladesh. He was considered for the post of commissioner of the Election Commission in 2017. He criticized the government providing interest free loans to civil service officers to buy cars. He also had criticized the top heavy nature of the Bangladesh Civil Service. He has been critical of the Awami League government politicizing the bureaucracy and reducing the quality of the service.

Majumder is a former chairman of Biman Bangladesh Airlines. He is an executive committee member of Citizens for Good Governance (SHUJAN). He is a director of MIDAS Financing Limited. In November 2021, Majumder concurred with the International Institute for Democracy and Electoral Assistance report that democracy was in decline in Bangladesh. He is a director of MIDAS (Micro Industries Development Assistance and Services). In April 2023, he was elected chairman of MIDAS Financing Limited. On 12 August 2024, he was appointed as Special Assistant to the Chief Adviser. He has been serving as an adviser of the Interim government of Bangladesh since 16 August 2024. On 10 November 2024, He is appointed as Adviser of food. On 20 January 2025, He was appointed as Adviser of Land to the Interim government of Bangladesh.
