= Bangladesh Administrative Service Association =

Association

- Abbreviation: BASA
- Formation: 1981
- Headquarters: Dhaka, Bangladesh
- Location: 63 New Eskaton, Dhaka
- Region served: Bangladesh
- Official language: Bengali
- Website: basa.org.bd

The Bangladesh Administrative Service Association is the association of the Bangladesh Civil Service administration cadre. Md. Mostafa Kamal is the president of the association and S.M. Alam is the general secretary.

== History ==
The Bangladesh Administrative Service Association was established on 19 April 1981 for the administration cadre of Bangladesh Civil Service. The chairperson of the association is also the chairperson of the BIAM Foundation.

On 29 October 2007, the caretaker government provided immunity to executive magistrates from prosecution following negotiations between the government and the association. The association opposed the separation of the judiciary and the executive which the caretaker government was trying to do. Their actions were criticised by the Bangladesh Judicial Service Association. After the Awami League came to power in 2009, the association began lobbying again for judicial powers for administrative officers.

In July 2017, the association criticised the arrest of the upazila nirbahi officer (UNO) of Barguna Sadar Upazila, Tariq Salman, after the religious affairs secretary of Barisal District unit of the Awami League, Obaidullah Saju, filed a case against him for publishing a distorted photo of President Sheikh Mujibur Rahman on an invitation card. Obaidullah was suspended by the Awami League for filing the case.

The Bangladesh Police Service Association represents the police cadre of Bangladesh Civil Service and the two associations agreed to work together in 2018.

The Bangladesh Administrative Service Association held events across the country on 12 December 2020, pledging not to allow insults against president Mujib. On 5 September 2020, the Bangladesh Administrative Service Association described a robbery and assault of UNO Wahida Khanam of Ghoraghat Upazila as premeditated.

The Bangladesh Administrative Service Association demanded the arrest of Serniabat Sadiq Abdullah, mayor of Barisal, on 20 August 2021 following an attack on official residence of the UNO, Munibur Rahman by Bangladesh Chhatra League and mayor's office staff. 50 people were injured including some with bullet wounds after Munibur Rahman ordered the paramilitary Bangladesh Ansar personnel to open fire. The association called the mayor and his personnel political thugs. The language used in the association statement was criticised by senior administration cadres.

== See also ==
- Bangladesh Judicial Service Association
- Bangladesh Police Service Association
