= Md. Mahbub Hossain =

Bangladeshi retired civil servant

Md Mahbub Hossain
- মোঃ মাহবুব হোসেন
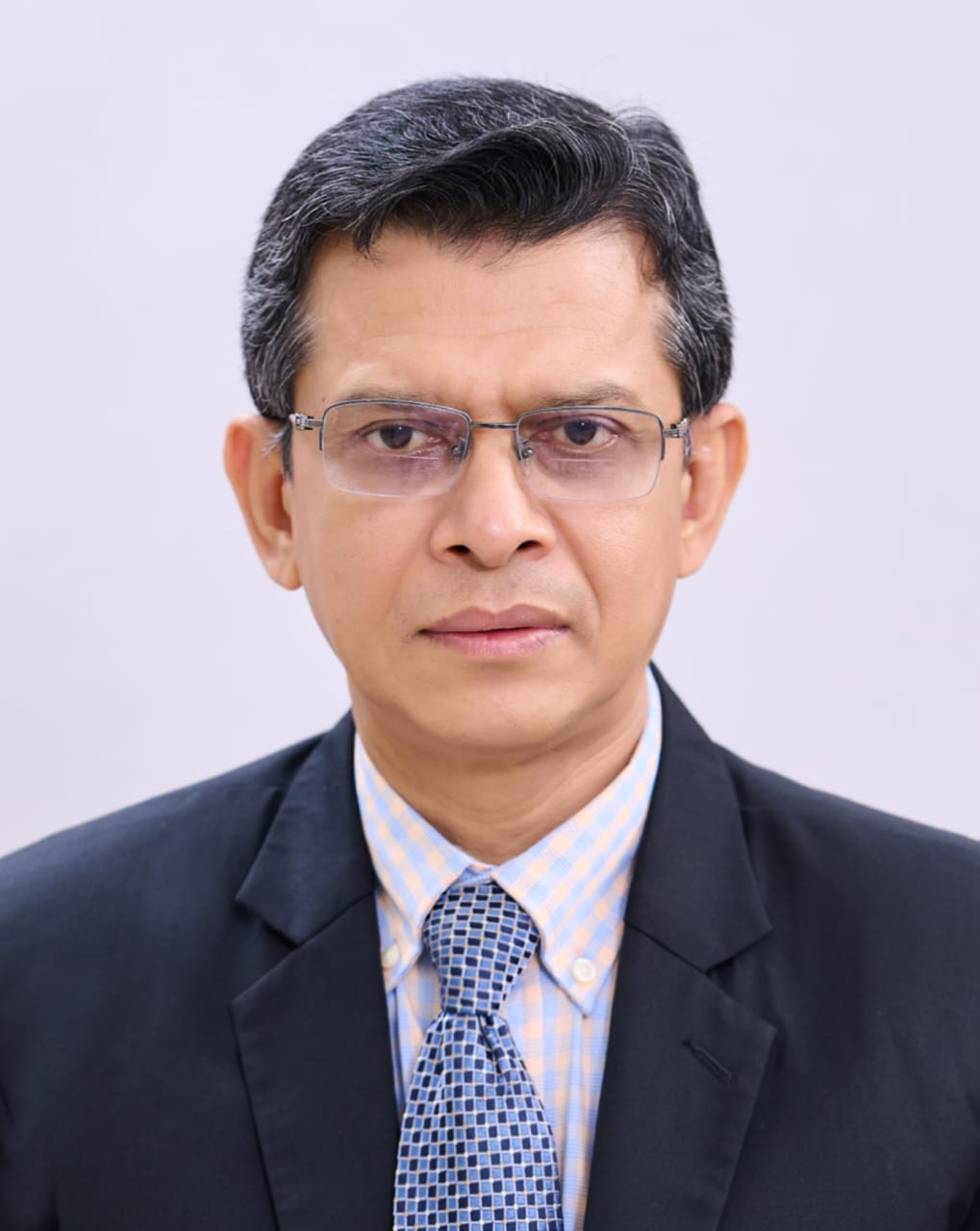
- Official portrait, 2023

24th Cabinet Secretary of Bangladesh
- In office 3 January 2023 – 13 October 2024
- President: Mohammed Shahabuddin
- Prime Minister: Sheikh Hasina; Muhammad Yunus (Chief Adviser)
- Preceded by: Kabir Bin Anwar
- Succeeded by: Sheikh Abdur Rashid

Personal details
- Born: October 13, 1964 (age 61) Barisal District, East Pakistan (present day Bangladesh)
- Spouse: Dina Haque
- Education: University of Dhaka; University of North London; University of Melbourne; Barishal Cadet College

Md. Mahbub Hossain (born 13 October 1964) is a retired Bangladesh civil servant and former Cabinet Secretary of Bangladesh. Prior to this position, he was Senior Secretary of the Energy and Mineral Resources Division of the Ministry of Power, Energy and Mineral Resources. He also served as the chairperson of Titas Gas and Gas Transmission Company Limited. He served as the chairman of Omera LPG as nominee of MJL Bangladesh Limited. He served as a director of Karnaphuli Fertilizer Company Limited.

== Early life ==
Hossain was born on 13 October 1965 in Patarchar, Muladi Upazila, Barisal District. In 1979, Hossain completed his S.S.C from Barisal Residential Model College which was converted to Barishal Cadet College. He completed his H.S.C from Brojomohun College, Barisal two years later. He completed his undergraduate and masters in sociology from the University of Dhaka in 1984 and 1985. He did an M.B.A. from the University of North London and a Master in Gender and Development from the University of Melbourne, Australia.

== Career ==
Hossain joined the administration cadre of the Bangladesh Civil Service on 20 December 1989 in 1986 batch.

Hossain was a Trainer of the National Academy for Planning and Development. He was a former Deputy Chief in charge of gender affairs at the Health Economics Unit. He was a former director of the Bangladesh Climate Change Trust. He was a former Secretary of the Dhaka South City Corporation. He also served in the Prime Minister's Office.

Hossain was promoted to Senior Secretary on 31 December 2019. He served in the Ministry of Education as secretary of the Secondary and Higher Education Division.

In December 2021, Hossain was appointed as a Senior Secretary of Energy and Mineral Resources Division of the Ministry of Power, Energy and Mineral Resources replacing Anisur Rahman who went on retirement.

Hossain was the vice-president of the Dhaka University Sociology Alumni Association and a member of the Australia Alumni Association Bangladesh. He was a member of the board of governors of Bangladesh Institute of International and Strategic Studies. He was the chairperson of Gas Transmission Company Limited.

In April 2022, Hossain met Faruque Hassan, President of Bangladesh Garment Manufacturers and Exporters Association to discuss the supply of natural gas to garment factories. He inaugurated Kailashtilla Gas Field of Sylhet Gas Fields Limited in 2022.

After the fall of the Sheikh Hasina led Awami League government, a murder case was filed against Hossain by Bangladesh Nationalist Party politician Mohammad Zaman Hossain Khan over the death of a protestor in July 2024.
