= Qazi Shamsul Alam =

Bangladesh civil servant (1942–2021)

Qazi Shamsul Alam (1 January 1942 – 1 October 2021) was the cabinet secretary of Bangladesh.

== Early life ==
Shamsul Alam was born on 1 January 1942. He completed his M.A. from the University of Dhaka in 1962.

== Career ==
Shamsul Alam joined the Central Superior Services of Pakistan in 1964. He was the assistant commissioner of Sylhet District in 1966. He was the deputy director of food of the Hyrderabad region in West Pakistan in 1968.

In 1980, Shamsul Alam was the joint secretary at the Ministry of Finance.

Shamsul Alam was the additional secretary of the External Resources Division in 1990. He signed an agreement with the World Food Programme on behalf of Bangladesh. He was an alternate governor of the Asian Development Bank.

In 1991, Shamsul Alam was the secretary of the Ministry of Labour and Manpower. Shamsul Alam was a member of the Bangladesh Planning Commission in 1997.

In January 2000, Shamsul Alam, as cabinet secretary, conducted the oath taking ceremony of Chief Justice Latifur Rahman.

Shamsul Alam was elected member of the Fair Election Monitoring Alliance in 2004.

Shamsul Alam was the treasurer of the Fair Election Monitoring Alliance in 2008.

== Death ==
Shamsul Alam died on 1 October 2021 of neurological complications following brain surgery.

== Bibliography ==
- Recent Development in World Demand for Jute, with Particular Reference to Jute-synthetics Competition (1976)
