= Bangladesh Water Development Board =

Bangladesh Government agency

- বাংলাদেশ পানি উন্নয়ন বোর্ড; Baṅladeś Pani Unnoẏōn Bōrḍ

Government agency overview
- Formed: 1972; 54 years ago
- Preceding Government agency: East Pakistan Water and Power Development Authority
- Status: Active
- Headquarters: Pani Bhaban, 72 Green Road, Dhaka-1205, Bangladesh
- Motto: وَجَعَلْنَا مِنَ الْمَاءِ كُلَّ شَيْءٍ حَيٍّ ^{[Quran 21:30]} "And We created from water every living thing." (heraldic slogan)
- Minister responsible: Md.Shahiduddin Chowdhury Anee, MP, Minister for Water Resources
- Government agency executive: Md. Ruhul Amin, Director General
- Parent department: Ministry of Water Resources
- Website: Bangladesh Water Development Board

Bangladesh Water Development Board is a government agency which is responsible for flood control, drainage and irrigation i.e. water management in Bangladesh and its headquarters is located in Pani Bhaban, Dhaka. Md. Ruhul Amin is the Director General of the board since 05 July 2026.

== History ==
From 1954 to 1956 there were a series of consecutive floods in East Pakistan. J A. Krug, a US State Department official, led a mission to investigate and recommend solutions. On their recommendation East Pakistan Water and Power Development Authority (EPWAPDA) was formed for water management. After the independence of Bangladesh, the authority was split into Bangladesh Water Development Board and Bangladesh Power Development Board. It is under the Ministry of Water Resources. It manages irrigation, flood control and drainage system.

== See also ==
- Char Development and Settlement Project
- BWDB Job Circular 2025
