= SM Shafiul Azam =

Bangladeshi politician, Ex. Pakistani and Bangladeshi civil servant

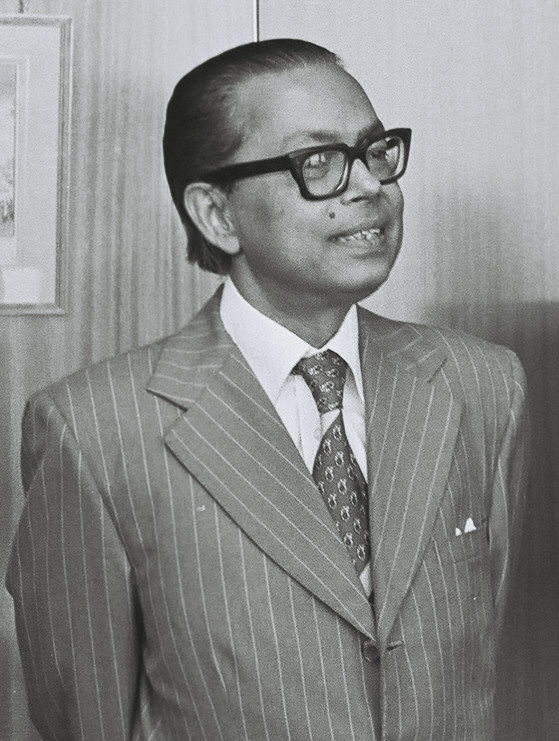
- Azam at the European Union in Brussels (1978)

Bangladeshi Minister for Communication, Industry, Jute, and Mineral Resources
- President: Ziaur Rahman

Personal details
- Died: 4 December 1991
- Education: University of Dhaka

SM Shafiul Azam (1923 – 4 December 1991) was a Bangladeshi civil servant.

== Biography ==
Shafiul Azam graduated with a degree in Law and English from the University of Dhaka. From 1948 to 1949, Shafiul Azam taught English literature at Dhaka College. He successfully stood first for the Central Superior Services of Pakistan examination.

In 1969, Shafiul Azam became the first Bengali chief secretary of East Pakistan. After the Independence of Bangladesh, he found himself out of favor with the new government. After the government changed he went on to become Deputy Secretary and cabinet secretary. He served as the Deputy of the Bangladesh Planning Commission. He served as the Minister of Communication, Industry, Jute, and Mineral Resources in the Cabinet of President Ziaur Rahman.

Shafiul Azam died on 4 December 1991.
