= JAAGO Foundation =

Bangladeshi non-profit organisation

- জাগো ফাউন্ডেশন
- Abbreviation: JAAGO
- Formation: April 14, 2007; 19 years ago
- Founder: Korvi Rakshand
- Type: Nonprofit
- Purpose: Education & Youth Development
- Headquarters: Banani, Dhaka
- Locations: Bangladesh; United States; United Kingdom
- Coordinates: 23.7984963°N 90.4030951°E
- Services: Sponsor A Child
- Staff: 600
- Volunteers: 60,000
- Students: 30,000
- Website: jaago.com.bd

JAAGO Foundation (Bengali: জাগো ফাউন্ডেশন) is a non-profit organisation based in Bangladesh providing education and social development opportunities to underprivileged children and communities. Established in April 2007 by Korvi Rakshand, the foundation has become a leading force in addressing issues related to education, poverty alleviation, and youth empowerment in the country.

It operates several schools and learning centres throughout Bangladesh, providing education to over 30,000 marginalised children. Their initiatives extend beyond primary education, encompassing a holistic approach to other aspects of development, including climate change, women empowerment, good governance, and youth development.

Volunteer for Bangladesh is a youth development program of JAAGO Foundation whose mission is to inspire, mobilise, and support a network of volunteers who work towards creating a better and more equitable society. Currently, they have over 50,000 members throughout 64 districts of Bangladesh.

== History ==
JAAGO Foundation started in April 2007 with 17 students when Korvi Rakshand, along with some of his friends, decided to teach children from underprivileged communities. Together, they rented a room in the slums of Rayer Bazaar and began their journey.

Seeing the students' enthusiasm and interest in formal learning, they decided to turn JAAGO into an actual school and hence, JAAGO Foundation School was established. Apart from free-of-cost English primary education, the students were also provided with nutritious meals, healthcare, classroom materials and boundless opportunities.

In 2009, the JAAGO Foundation Gazipur School was established to provide quality education to marginalised children residing outside of Dhaka. However, after a few months, due to a lack of experienced teachers, the results of the students were not up to the mark. This problem was persistent in every part of the country, and to combat this, JAAGO came up with a unique solution.

In 2011, JAAGO Foundation took a project to provide quality of education to people of Rajshahi and start working on it in September 2012 finally a school was established first they do online classes by computer and teacher from Dhaka take classes however after COVID-19 JAAGO acquire good teachers and start offline classes.

JAAGO launched its Digital School pilot project in 2011. Teachers from Dhaka would take classes of students across the country using video conferencing tools. A local teacher would be present at the class to monitor and assist the students. Started as a pilot project, this soon became a successful model that allowed JAAGO to take quality education to the remotest parts of Bangladesh.

In 2011, the JAAGO Foundation formed 'Volunteer for Bangladesh', a youth-led organisation committed to bringing about sustainable development in society by contributing to fulfilling the Sustainable Development Goals of the government. They worked in various areas, such as climate action, civic education, and youth training. To date, the organisation has served in 64 districts of Bangladesh in times of need and has over 50,000 active volunteers.

During COVID-19, when children from underprivileged communities were at risk of dropping out, the JAAGO Foundation introduced mobile learning, which enabled children to attend classes with a regular cell phone.

JAAGO has been working with UNICEF, United States Department of State, Foreign, Commonwealth and Development Office (FCDO), Malala Fund, Plan International, Care International and UN Women for multiple development projects for the purpose of poverty alleviation, women empowerment, providing healthcare benefits to marginalised communities and engaging them in skill development initiatives.

== Programs ==
Education:

Since the inception of JAAGO Foundation, education has been its core focus. Started in 2007, the JAAGO Foundation School provided formal education to thousands of children from marginalised backgrounds.

Currently, they have over 5000 students enrolled in their formal schools following the National Curriculum and Textbook Board curriculum. Through their digital school program, they have changed the educational landscape of Bangladesh by making quality education accessible to the remotest areas of Bangladesh.

As of 2023, JAAGO has created learning opportunities for over 30,000 children across the country. The organisation also assists its meritorious students in applying for scholarships in the county and abroad.

Educate the Most Disadvantaged Children (EMDC) is a project implemented by JAAGO Foundation with funding from UNICEF and Commonwealth and Development Office (FCDO). The aim of the project is to bring 11,124 dropout children of the Lama and Ramu districts back to school by bridging their knowledge gap.

Sponsor A Child

The Sponsor A Child program of the JAAGO Foundation aims at community engagement for sustainable development. Through contributing to the program, one gets to fund the education of a child from underprivileged background on a monthly/yearly basis.

Through the donation, the sponsor gets to ensure quality education, nutritious meals, healthcare and skill development initiatives for their sponsored child. This program allows individuals to create an impact in society and create a more equitable world for all.

Anyone can become a sponsor by simply registering to JAAGO's Sponsor A Child Program.

Youth Development:

JAAGO Foundation formed Volunteer for Bangladesh (VBD) in 2011 to provide the youth of Bangladesh a voice and a platform for contributing to creating positive impacts. The core values of the youth-led organisation include a commitment to diversity, equity, and inclusion, as well as a focus on community-driven solutions and sustainable development.

Volunteer for Bangladesh has over 50,000 registered volunteers throughout the country. These volunteers always come forward in times of national crisis like flood, drought, fire, earthquake or any other hazard. They also work to raise awareness regarding crucial topics like female education, youth empowerment, democracy, digital safety, equality and mass development.

The youth-led organisation has its own independent organogram, which includes a national board, divisional boards, district boards, members and alums.

Women Empowerment:

In 2022, the JAAGO Foundation, in partnership with U-Go, started the JAAGO Women Scholarship. The scholarship aids uninterrupted education for young, meritorious female students of public universities from underprivileged backgrounds.

The JAAGO Foundation, in collaboration with the Malala Fund, launched the 3-year long ODOMMO project in November 2022. Odommo aims to break down the walls of poverty, gender discrimination, social norms, and environmental hazards in the way of girls' education.

To foster menstrual health management amongst its students, the JAAGO Foundation introduced Girls' Support Corner in JAAGO Foundation Schools, which contains free-of-cost sanitary pads, medicines and awareness-raising materials.

Apart from these, the organisation conducts regular health checkups, mental health awareness and female abuse prevention campaigns for its students and their communities.

Climate Change:

In 2020, when Cyclone Amphan hit the southern coasts of Bangladesh, the volunteers of JAAGO played an active role in eradicating the sufferings of the affected people of the region.

March 2022, JAAGO organised roundtable discussions on "Climate Action: Mitigation and Adaptation" involving the youths of the country. To drive youth-led changes to combat climate change, in the same year, JAAGO Foundation, in partnership with UNICEF and Generation Unlimited, launched the imagen Ventures Youth Challenge.

In June 2022, JAAGO distributed relief materials to flood victims in Sylhet.

In 2024, Floods in south Eastern part of Bangladesh volunteer of JAAGO helped victims of flood by distributing relief material

To date, the volunteers of JAAGO have implemented 100+ projects to tackle climate change in collaboration with the Commonwealth of Nations, the British High Commission, and ActionAid.

Governance:

In 2018, JAAGO launched the 'I Pledge for Peace" campaign promoting peace during elections, where 1 Million signatures were collected for a peaceful election.

JAAGO formed the 'Human Rights Education Club' to help people learn more about crucial human rights issues like bullying, teaching girls how to defend themselves, and understanding the rights of individuals.

'Youth Vote Matters' was initiated to make youths aware of their voting rights and to foster their participation in the 2023 National Elections.

== Institutional partners ==
UNICEF, United States Agency for International Development (USAID), Foreign, Commonwealth and Development Office (FCDO), Australian Aid (AUSAID), Malala Fund, Embassy of the United States, Dhaka, United States Department of State, UN Women, WaterAid, The Asia Foundation, United Nations Development Programme (UNDP), New Zealand Embassy, Netherlands Embassy, International Republican Institute, Plan International, Care International, etc.

== Private sector partners ==
BEXIMCO, Summit Group, Standard Chartered Bangladesh, United Finance, IPDC Finance, Mituli Foundation, Sonali Life Insurance, Green Delta Insurance, etc.

== International operations ==
JAAGO has now opened supporting branches in U.S., UK, Canada and Australia. Most of these branches are operated by native nationals who once worked as volunteers for JAAGO.

== Awards ==
- Mosaic International Award
- Commonwealth Youth Awards 2013 Finalist
- Japanese Award for Most Innovative Development Project (2015) by Global Development Network
- UNESCO King Hamad Bin Isa Al-Khalifa Prize (2016)
- Commonwealth Point of Light (2021)
- Sheikh Hasina Youth Volunteer Award (2022)
- Ramon Magsaysay Award; Emergent Leadership category (2023)
