= Ministry of Water Resources (Bangladesh) =

Government ministry of Bangladesh

People's Republic of Bangladesh Minister for Water Resources
- বাংলাদেশের পানি সম্পদ মন্ত্রী
- Government Seal of Bangladesh

- Flag of Bangladesh

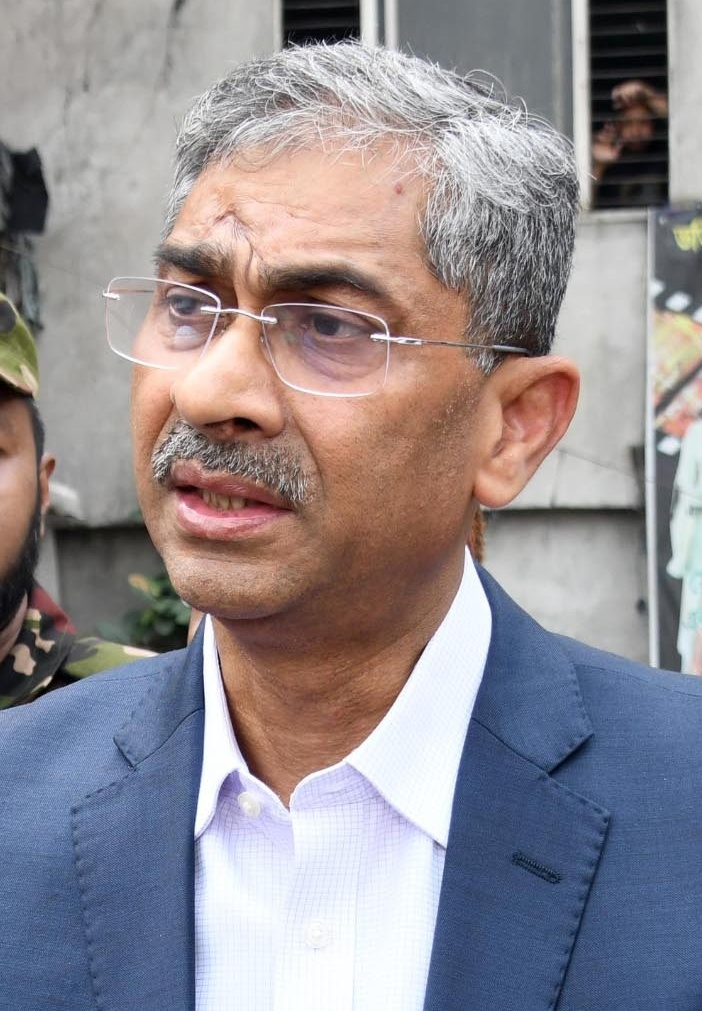
- Incumbent; Shahid Uddin Chowdhury Anee since 17 February 2026
- [Ministry of Water Resources (Bangladesh); Ministry of Water Resources]
- Style: The Honourable (formal); His Excellency (diplomatic)
- Type: Cabinet minister
- Reports to: Prime Minister
- Seat: Bangladesh Secretariat
- Nominator: Prime Minister of Bangladesh
- Appointer: President of Bangladesh on the advice of the Prime Minister
- Term length: Prime Minister's pleasure
- Constituting instrument: Constitution of Bangladesh
- Formation: {start date and age|12 January 1972}}
- First holder: Khondaker Mostaq Ahmad
- Salary: ৳105000 (US$860) per month (incl. allowances)
- Website: https://emrd.gov.bd/

The Ministry of Water Resources (Bengali: পানি সম্পদ মন্ত্রণালয়; Pāni sampada mantraṇālaẏa) is a ministry of the government of the People's Republic of Bangladesh, which formulates all kinds of policies, plans, strategies, guidelines and laws, rules, regulations, etc. for the development and management of water resources and the management and control of the departments under its jurisdiction. This ministry prepares and implements development projects on flood control, irrigation and drainage, prevention of riverbank erosion, delta development, land reclamation, etc. through the construction of barrages, regulators, sluices, canals, embankments, rubber dams, flood control dams, coastal embankments and canals. Excavation-re-excavation provides services such as irrigation, flood control, flood prevention, river bank erosion prevention, land reclamation etc.

== Directorates ==
- Institute of Water Modeling
- River Research Institute
- Water Resources Planning Organisation (WARPO)
- Bangladesh Water Development Board
- Bangladesh Haor and Wetland Development Board
- Flood Forecasting and Warning Center
- Joint River Commission, Bangladesh
- Centre for Environmental and Geographic Information Services
