= Kamal Uddin Siddiqui =

Bangladeshi economist and social scientist (1945–2025)

- কামাল উদ্দিন সিদ্দিকী
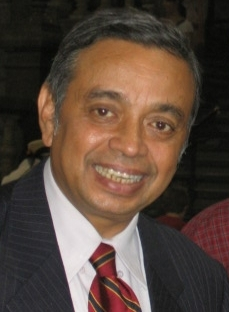
- Siddiqui in 2006
- Born: 22 October 1945
- Died: 3 November 2025 (aged 80); Dhaka, Bangladesh
- Education: University of London
- Occupation: Economist

Kamal Uddin Siddiqui (22 October 1945 – 3 November 2025) was a Bangladeshi economist and social scientist. He was a faculty member of Monash University.

In 1971, he participated in the Liberation War of Bangladesh. A career civil servant, he served as the principal secretary to Prime Minister Khaleda Zia until 2006. He was nominated by Bangladesh for election to the United Nations Committee on the Rights of the Child, and served from 2005 to 2009. He was, until 2006, chief editor of the Encyclopedia of Flora and Fauna of Bangladesh, the first volumes of which were published in 2008 by the Asiatic Society of Bangladesh.

== Career ==
Bangladesh's war of liberation commenced on 25 March 1971. At that time, Siddiqui was serving as the sub-divisional officer (SDO) of Norail. He quit his job and walked to India to participate in the war against the Pakistani army. After the establishment of Bangladesh on 16 December 1971, he returned home and was appointed the deputy commissioner (DC) and district magistrate of the Khulna District.

Beginning in February 2005, he was serving as the chairperson of the Committee on the Rights of the Child of United Nations High Commission for Human Rights. His achievements during the last three years before his death include the release of a large number of children from jails, establishment of nurseries in prisons and safe homes, raising the age of criminal liability and converting correction centres for children into development centres. Recognized as a champion of children by the High Court Division of the Supreme Court of Bangladesh in its landmark judgement in a child rights case in 2003, owing to these activities.

In October 2006, Siddiqui was terminated from his position as the principal secretary of Prime Minister Khaleda Zia after the caretaker government assumed power. His contractual appointment was extended five times by the Bangladesh Nationalist Party, a record for the civil administration of Bangladesh. He went on the run after a number of corruption cases were filed against him.

=== Research ===
While teaching at Monash University, Siddiqui co-authored a book on diplomacy which was published in 2009.

Siddiqui coined the term "cocktail ideology" to characterise the cultural profile of the Bangladeshi people in the 21st century. A "cocktail ideology", combining the retrogressive interpretation of religion and tradition with vulgar elements of the so-called modernity, has emerged in many developing countries since the 1960s and the population of Bangladesh, among other developing countries, reflects uneasy and tense co-existence of these two components. Women and middle-aged men are, in general, the bearers of tradition and religious orthodoxy, while the younger generation tends to carry the flag for "decadent modernity". It has been found that the poor tend to be more affected by this "cocktail ideology" than any other class of society.

Social formation in Dhaka City is a study which takes stock of the social formation of Dhaka as it evolved in the latter half of the 20th century. Kamal Siddiqui carried out this research in association with Sayeda Rowshan Qadir, Sitara Alamgir and Sayeedul Huq.

== Death ==
Siddiqui died at his home in Dhaka's Gulshan neighbourhood, on 3 November 2025, at the age of 80.

== Publications ==
- Kamal Siddiqui (Editor in Chief) Encyclopaedia of Flora and Fauna of Bangladesh: 2008; Asiatic Society, Dhaka.
- Megacity Governance in South Asia : A Comparative Study, 2004, University Press Ltd., Dhaka.
- Better days, better lives: Towards a strategy for implementing the convention on the rights of the child in Bangladesh, 2001, University Press Ltd., Dhaka.
- Local governance in Bangladesh: Leading issues and major challenges, 2000, University Press Ltd., Dhaka.(The third edition of the book was published in 2005).
- Jagatpur, 1977–97: Poverty and social change in rural Bangladesh, 2000, University Press Ltd., Dhaka.
- Land Management in South Asia: A Comparative Study, 1997, Dhaka.
- Fiscal decentralisation in Bangladesh, 1991, National Institute of Local Government, Dhaka.
- An evaluation of the Grameen Bank operation, 1984, Dhaka.
- Towards good governance in Bangladesh: Fifty unpleasant Essays, 1996, Dhaka.
- Local Government in Bangladesh, 1994, Dhaka.
- Social Formation in Dhaka City, 1993, University Press Ltd., Dhaka.
- Implementation of land reform in four villages of Bangladesh (APDAC's policies and implementation of land reform series), 1980, Dhaka.
- The political economy of land reforms in Bangladesh, 1979, Dhaka.
- Bāṃlādeśe bhūmi-saṃskārera rājanaitika arthanīti, 1981, Bāṃlādeśa Unnaẏana Gabeshaṇā Saṃsthā, Dhaka.
