= M Musharraf Hossain Bhuiyan =

Bangladeshi civil servant

M Musharraf Hossain Bhuiyan is a retired Bangladeshi government civil service officer and former Cabinet Secretary of Bangladesh.

== Early life ==
Bhuiyan was born 15 December 1956 in Narsingdi, East Bengal, Pakistan. He did his bachelor's and master's from the University of Dhaka in English Literature.

== Career ==
Bhuiyan joined Bangladesh Civil Service in 1981.

Bhuiyan was the Commercial Counsellor, Bangladesh Mission, Dubai, UAE (2002-2005). He was a faculty member at the Bangladesh Public Administration Training Centre from 1991 to 1996.

Bhuiyan was Secretary of the Ministry of Primary and Mass Education from 2007 to 2008. He was the Chairman of the Bangladesh, Oil, Gas and Mineral Corporation (PetroBangla) (2005–2006).

Bhuiyan was the Secretary of the Economic Relations Division at the Ministry of Finance 2008 to 2011.

Bhuiyan served as the Cabinet Secretary of Bangladesh till October 2015. He was then appointed Alternate Executive Director to the World Bank.

Bhuiyan was the chairman of the Officers Club, Dhaka. He is the former president of the Bangladesh Billiard & Snooker Federation. He is a former director of Bangladesh Bank.
