= Sheikh Abdur Rashid =

25th cabinet secretary of Bangladesh (born 1957)

- শেখ আব্দুর রশিদ
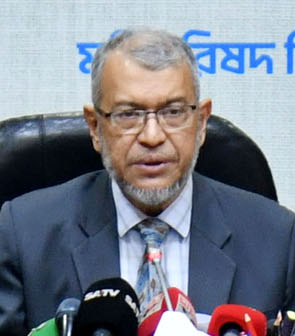
- Rashid in 2025

25th Cabinet Secretary of Bangladesh
- In office 14 October 2024 – 14 February 2026
- President: Mohammed Shahabuddin
- Prime Minister: Muhammad Yunus (Chief Adviser)
- Preceded by: Md. Mahbub Hossain
- Succeeded by: Md. Siraj Uddin Miah

Personal details
- Born: 5 May 1957 (age 69) Satkhira District, East Pakistan (present day Bangladesh)
- Education: University of Dhaka; International Institute of Social Studies
- Profession: Civil Servant

Sheikh Abdur Rashid (born May 5, 1957) is a Bangladeshi government official who has served as the chairman of Petrobangla and additional secretary of the Ministry of Home Affairs. In 2024, the Yunus Interim Government brought him back from retirement as secretary in the Department of Secondary and Higher Education. Later, he was promoted to the position of secretary and is currently serving as the 25th Cabinet Secretary of Bangladesh.

== Early life and education ==
Rashid was born on 5 May 1957 in the Satkhira District, East Pakistan, Pakistan. He ranked third in the merit list in both the Secondary School Certificate (SSC) and Higher Secondary School Certificate (HSC) exams. He obtained his bachelor's and master's degrees in political science from the University of Dhaka. Additionally, he earned an MA in Public Policy and Administration from the International Institute of Social Studies in The Hague, Netherlands, and a PhD in public administration from the University of Dhaka in 2005.

== Career ==
Rashid ranked fourth in the combined merit list of the 1982 batch of the Bangladesh Civil Service and first in the administration cadre. He then joined the administration, serving as upazila executive officer, additional deputy commissioner, and deputy commissioner in field administration. During the tenure of Khaleda Zia's government, he served as a director in the Prime Minister's Office and later became a director-general there. He also served as the chairman of Petrobangla and as an additional secretary of the Ministry of Home Affairs.

After the Awami League government took office in 2009, Rashid was made OSD (officer on special duty) under a false case. Though later proven innocent through investigation, he was informed of this only four years later, by which time he had already retired.

Rashid served as the senior secretary of the Department of Secondary and Higher Education. On October 8, 2024, through an official notification, he was appointed as the 25th Cabinet secretary of Bangladesh, effective from October 14, 2024, on a two-year contract.

Following the fall of the Awami League government on August 5, during the student-popular uprising, an interim government was formed. While retired, he was reappointed to the Department of Secondary and Higher Education on a two-year contract on August 17. The next day, August 18, he was promoted to the position of senior secretary. He was then appointed the Cabinet Secretary, and Siddique Zobair replaced him as secretary of Ministry of Education.
