= Bangladesh Administrative Service =

Cadre of the Bangladesh Civil Service

The Bangladesh Administrative Service (BAS) is the premier civil service cadre of the Bangladesh Civil Service, which formulates and executes the policies of the Government of Bangladesh.

Bangladesh Administrative Service

BAS officers hold all senior and middle-ranking administrative posts, such as the permanent heads (non-political) of government ministries, as well as divisions and departments within ministries, in the central secretariat headquartered in Dhaka.

Additionally, in the field administration (outside central government ministries), the senior administrative posts in the eight divisions and their sub-units are also held by officers of the BAS.

The cabinet secretary is the senior post in the BAS (as well as the Bangladesh Civil Service), as the chief civil servant in the Cabinet Division, and is by virtue regarded as the most senior civil servant in Bangladesh.

== History ==
- British Era (1858-1947, see Indian Civil Service)
- Pakistan Era (1947–1971, see Central Superior Services of Pakistan)
- Bangladesh Era (1971–present, see Bangladesh Civil Service)

== Rank structure ==
Rank in Central Administration
Cabinet Secretary
Principal Secretary
Senior Secretary
Secretary
Additional Secretary
Joint Secretary
Deputy Secretary
Senior Assistant Secretary
Assistant Secretary

== Recruitment ==
All BAS officers are recruited at a single entry level by the Bangladesh Public Service Commission, having undertaken and scored highest in what is widely regarded as the most competitive examination in Bangladesh, the Bangladesh Civil Service examination. These candidates are then commissioned into the Bangladesh Civil Service (Administration) cadre.

The first post of all new officers is as assistant commissioner in the field administration on a 2-year probation, after which they are confirmed on passing assessments. The most promising officers are transferred to the central administration as senior assistant secretary after 5 years in the field administration, during which they will rotate between the centre and field on their career progression.

== Functions ==
=== Central administration ===
In a ministry or division, BAS officers are responsible for policy formulation and implementation to ministers. They mainly perform four types of functions: secretarial, administrative (policy), communications, and financial; as either policy advisers or in management roles.

=== Field administration ===
In field administration, BAS officers play two different roles from the start of their careers: as a "commissioner" delivering government policy in their geographic unit, and as an executive magistrate. They execute the powers of executive magistracy to the extent specified by government directives and Acts of Parliament.

Section 10 of the Code of Criminal Procedure specifies that a deputy commissioner, additional deputy commissioner, senior assistant commissioner (also UNO) and assistant commissioner (also of land) are all executive magistrates in field administration.

Additionally, as per subsection 10(5), if required, the government can empower any member of the Bangladesh Administrative Service as an executive magistrate by means of deputation, e.g., executive magistrate in organisations like the Bangladesh Road and Transport Authority (BRTA), city corporations, ports, airports, etc.

== Bangladesh Civil Service Administration Academy ==
The academy provides a five-month-long basic training course related to law and administration for newly appointed officers of the Bangladesh Civil Service (Administration) cadre, and various periodical training for officers of different levels. In addition, a one-year "Master in Public Policy and Management (MPPM)" course is delivered by the academy to mid-ranking BAS officers.

The academy is headed by the rector, who is of the rank of secretary to the government.

== Administrative Service Association ==
The Bangladesh Administrative Service Association (BASA) is a professional platform and club for all the members of the BAS, including retired officers. The association's headquarters is located in Eskaton, Dhaka.

BASA arranges an annual get-together for its members, with the prime minister and cabinet secretary appearing regularly as the chief guests.
