= Cabinet Division =

Executive office of the Prime Minister of Bangladesh

Cabinet Division of the People's Republic of Bangladesh
- গণপ্রজাতন্ত্রী বাংলাদেশের মন্ত্রিপরিষদ বিভাগ
- Crest of Cabinet Division

Agency overview
- Formed: 19 October 1991 (34 years ago)
- Headquarters: Building No. 1, Room No. 301 Bangladesh Secretariat, Dhaka-1000.
- Annual budget: ৳105 crore (US$8.6 million) (2026-2027)
- Prime Minister responsible: Tarique Rahman, Chairman
- Agency executives: Nasimul Gani, Cabinet Secretary; Md. Kamal Hossain, Secretary, (Coordination & Reforms)
- Website: cabinet.gov.bd

The Cabinet Division (Bengali: মন্ত্রিপরিষদ বিভাগ) is a ministry-level executive office of the Government of Bangladesh, responsible for supporting the Prime Minister and the Cabinet. It is responsible for executive administration of the government and facilitating smooth transaction of business in the Cabinet. It assists in decision-making in the government by ensuring inter-ministerial coordination and resolving differences among ministries. The Cabinet Secretary heads the Cabinet Division under the Prime Minister as the minister in-charge.

== History ==
In 1972, the Ministry of Cabinet Affairs was created to provide secretarial assistance to the government of Bangladesh. After 1975, it was placed under President's Office.

After 1991, the presidential system of government by Act of Parliament was abolished, and by October 1991, Cabinet Division was formed as a full-fledged administrative unit.

== Functions ==
The Cabinet Division is responsible for writing and maintaining the Secretariat Instructions. This document outlines how ministries and divisions should interact with each other. Its purpose is "to ensure uniformity and efficiency in the observance of administrative practices and procedures". It supplements the Rules of Business, and all business of government is to be transacted in accordance with these two instruments. The secretary (the senior civil servant) in each ministry and division is responsible for ensuring the Secretariat Instructions are followed.

== See also ==
- Cabinet of Bangladesh
