= 2019 in Bangladesh =

- Centuries: 20th; 21st
- Decades: 1990s; 2000s; 2010s; 2020s
- See also: Other events of 2019; List of years in Bangladesh

2019 (MMXIX) was a common year starting on Tuesday of the Gregorian calendar, the 2019th year of the Common Era (CE) and Anno Domini (AD) designations, the 19th year of the 3rd millennium and the 21st century, and the 10th and last year of the 2010s decade.

Events of 2019 in Bangladesh. The year 2019 is the 48th year after the independence of Bangladesh. It is also the first year of the fourth term of the government of Sheikh Hasina.

== Incumbents ==
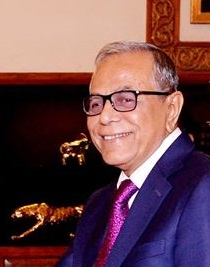
Abdul
Hamid

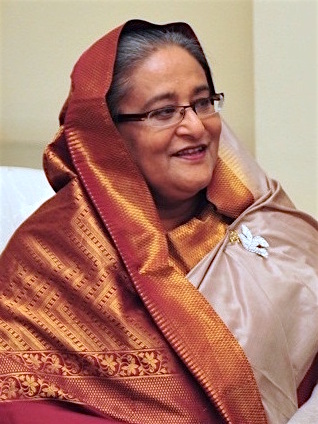
Sheikh
Hasina

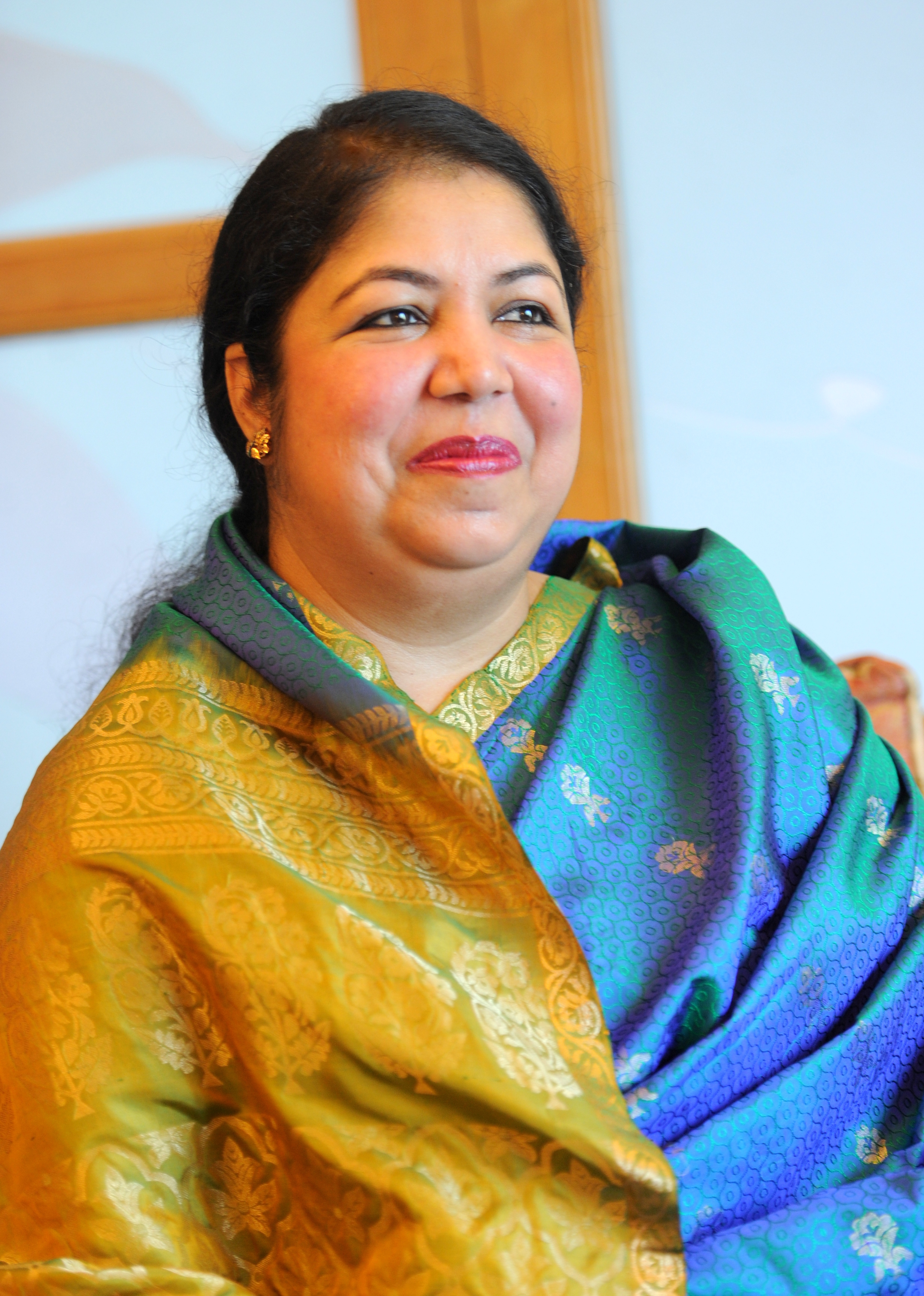
Shirin
Sharmin

- President: Mohammad Abdul Hamid
- Prime Minister: Sheikh Hasina
- Chief Justice: Syed Mahmud Hossain
- Speaker of Jatiya Sangsad: Shirin Sharmin Chaudhury

== Demography ==
Demographic Indicators for Bangladesh in 2019
Population, total	163,046,173
Population density (per km^{2})	1252.6
Population growth (annual %)	1.0%
Male to Female Ratio (every 100 Female)	102.4
Urban population (% of total)	37.4%
Birth rate, crude (per 1,000 people)	17.9
Death rate, crude (per 1,000 people)	5.5
Mortality rate, under 5 (per 1,000 live births)	31
Life expectancy at birth, total (years)	72.6
Fertility rate, total (births per woman)	2.0

== Economy ==
Key Economic Indicators for Bangladesh in 2019
National Income
	Current US$	Current BDT	% of GDP
GDP	$302.6 billion	BDT25.4 trillion	
GDP growth (annual %)	8.2%		
GDP per capita	$1,855.7	BDT155,936	
Agriculture, value added	$38.4 billion	BDT3.2 trillion	12.7%
Industry, value added	$89.7 billion	BDT7.5 trillion	29.6%
Services, etc., value added	$159.9 billion	BDT13.4 trillion	52.8%
Balance of Payment
	Current US$	Current BDT	% of GDP
Current account balance	-$2.9 billion		-1.0%
Imports of goods and services	$64.2 billion	BDT5.5 trillion	21.4%
Exports of goods and services	$44,961.0 million	BDT3.9 trillion	15.3%
Foreign direct investment, net inflows	$1,908.0 million		0.6%
Personal remittances, received	$18,363.9 million		6.1%
Total reserves (includes gold) at year end	$32,696.9 million		
Total reserves in months of imports	5.9		

Note: For the year 2019 average official exchange rate for BDT was 84.45 per US$.

== Events ==
- 3 January - Prime Minister Sheikh Hasina and the ruling party Bangladesh Awami League takes oath for the 3rd consecutive term after victory at the 11th general election.
- 16 February: Bangladesh drug war ends after the surrender of over 100 Drug Dealers. The conflict had resulted in over 800 deaths.
- 20 February - 67 victims are killed and approximately 40 injured when fire breaks out in the Chowk Bazaar area of Old Dhaka.
- 25 February - An aircraft hijacker attempting to hijack a plane in Chittagong Airport is gunned to death in a rescue operation thus saving the plane carrying 142 passengers from being hijacked.
- 28 February -
  - Atiqul Islam elected as the mayor of Dhaka North City Corporation.
  - Fire broke out in Bhashantek slum.
- 11 March - DUCSU election held after 28 years.
- 19 March - 7 people including 4 law enforcement officials were shot dead in Rangamati district during violence in local elections. The army was deployed in the area to bring the situation under control.
- 28 March - FR Tower fire kills at least 19 people and more 70+ injured.
- 30 March - The fourth fire of the year broke out on DNCC Market.
- 3 April - Two Bangladeshis Hussain Elius and Abdullah Al Morshed featured in the honorary internationally acclaimed magazine Forbes.
- 18 April - The year's fifth notable fire breaks out at a market in Malibagh area. Due to better preparations the fire was brought under control quicker than the previous fires. No deaths were reported.
- 1 July to 31 August - Dengue outbreak in Bangladesh. Over 20,000 people infected by the mosquito-borne disease in all 64 districts since July. Improper cleansing of dirty water bodies have been blamed for high numbers of mosquito breeding. By August the number of infections crossed 50,000.
- 24 September - Various illegal casinos were raided across the country by the police force, in an effort to stop gambling which is banned in Bangladesh. Numerous gambling organizers were detained and taken to custody by the police.
- 7 October: A second year student of electrical and electronic engineering department of the Bangladesh University of Engineering and Technology (BUET), was tortured and then killed by BUET's Chhatra League leaders inside BUET's Sher-e-Bangla Hall.
- 20–22 October: Riots in Bhola after police opened fire on protesters protesting against a Facebook post criticizing Islam. 4 protesters killed.
- 10 November - Cyclone Bulbul killed 17 people & 14 districts were heavily affected.
- 13 November - A train accident kills 20 people.
- 17 November - 7 people killed in a gas explosion in Chittagong.
- 12–13 December - The Keraniganj factory fire kills in total 12 people.

=== Awards and recognitions ===
==== Independence Day Award ====
Thirteen people and an organization were awarded.

Recipients	Area	Note
Mufazzal Haider Chaudhury	independence and liberation war	posthumous
ATM Zafar Alam	independence and liberation war	posthumous
AKM Mozammel Haque	independence and liberation war	
Khandaker Mosharraf Hossain	independence and liberation war	
Kazi Misbahun Nahar	independence and liberation war	
Abdul Khalek	independence and liberation war	posthumous
Mohammad Khaled	independence and liberation war	posthumous
Shaukat Ali Khan	independence and liberation war	posthumous
Nurunnahar Fatema Begum	medical science	
Qazi Kholiquzzaman Ahmad	social service	
Murtaja Baseer	culture	
Hasan Azizul Huq	literature	
Haseena Khan	research and training	
Bangladesh Institute of Nuclear Agriculture (BINA)	science and technology	

==== Ekushey Padak ====
1. Halima Khatun (posthumous - Language Movement)
2. Ghulam Arieff Tipoo (language Movement)
3. Monowara Islam (Language Movement)
4. Azam Khan (posthumous - music)
5. Subir Nandi (music)
6. Khairul Anam Shakil (music)
7. Liaquat Ali Lucky (art)
8. Suborna Mustafa (art)
9. Lucky Enam (art)
10. Sayeeda Khanam (photography)
11. Jamal Uddin Ahmed (fine art)
12. Khitindra Chandra Baishya (War of Liberation)
13. Biswajit Ghosh (research)
14. Mahbubul Haque (research)
15. Pranab Kumar Barua (education)
16. Harishankar Jaladas (language and literature)
17. Moinul Ahsan Saber (language and literature)
18. Anwara Syed Haq (language and literature)
19. Ashim Saha (language and literature)
20. Imdadul Haq Milan (language and literature)
21. Rizia Rahman (language and literature)

=== Sports ===
- 18 May - Bangladesh wins the tri-nations ODI Cricket series against West Indies and Ireland.
- 5 July - Bangladesh leaves the 2019 Cricket World Cup after losing to Pakistan in their game at the tournament.
- 1–10 December - Bangladesh archers Ety Khatun and Roman Sana won gold medals winning all the 10 archery events (both individual, and team events) in the 2019 South Asian Games.

== Deaths ==
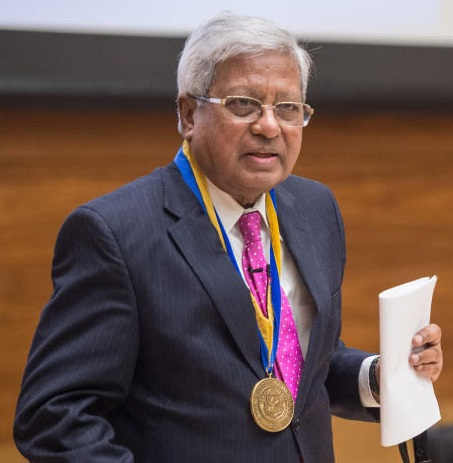
Sir Fazle Hasan Abed (1936–2019)

- 3 January - Sayed Ashraful Islam, politician
- 22 January - Ahmed Imtiaz Bulbul, lyricist, composer and music director
- 15 February - Al Mahmud, poet, novelist, and short-story writer
- 28 February - Shah Alamgir, journalist, DG of PIB
- 1 March - Polan Sarkar, social activist
- 23 March - Shahnaz Rahmatullah, singer (born 1952)
- 6 April - Tele Samad, Bangladeshi film actor
- 14 July – Hussain Muhammad Ershad, Bangladeshi politician, 11th President of Bangladesh (b. 1930)
- 16 August - Rizia Rahman, novelist (b. 1939)
- 4 November - Sadeque Hossain Khoka, former mayor of Dhaka (b. 1952)
- 20 December - Sir Fazle Hasan Abed, founder of BRAC

== See also ==
- 2010s in Bangladesh
- List of Bangladeshi films of 2019
- Timeline of Bangladeshi history

== Links ==
- Media related to 2019 in Bangladesh at Wikimedia Commons
