= 2021 in Bangladesh =

- Centuries: 20th; 21st
- Decades: 2000s; 2010s; 2020s
- See also: Other events of 2021; List of years in Bangladesh

2021 (MMXXI) was a common year starting on Friday of the Gregorian calendar, the 2021st year of the Common Era (CE) and Anno Domini (AD) designations, the 21st year of the 3rd millennium and the 21st century, and the 2nd year of the 2020s decade.

The year 2021 is the 50th year after the independence of Bangladesh. It is also the third year of the fourth term of the government of Sheikh Hasina. This year the entire country celebrated the 50th anniversary of independence.

== Incumbents ==
President	Prime Minister	Speaker	Chief Justice	Opposition Leader	Cabinet Secretary
Mohammad Abdul Hamid (Age 78)	Sheikh Hasina Wazed (Age 75)	Shirin Sharmin Chaudhury (Age 56)	Syed Mahmud Hossain (Age 68)	Rowshan Ershad (Age 79)	Khandker Anwarul Islam
Bangladesh Awami League (Since 14 March 2013)	Bangladesh Awami League (Since 6 January 2009)	Bangladesh Awami League (Since 1 May 2013)	Independent (2 February 2018 - 30 December 2021)	Jatiyo Party-E (Since 9 September 2019)	Independent (Since 28 October 2019)

== Events ==
=== January and February ===
- 14 January - A fire at the Nayapara refugee camp for Rohingya refugees in Cox's Bazar District burned down, destroying approximately 550 shelters.
- 25-28 February - Protests across the country following the death of journalist Mushtaq Ahmed in police custody.

=== March and April ===
- 19-29 March - Protests erupt across Bangladesh as Indian Prime Minister Narendra Modi visits the country.
- 22 March - At least 15 people are dead and at least 400 are missing after a massive fire strikes Cox Bazar's Rohingya refugee camp
- 4 April - Rescuers recover 26 bodies after a ferry collides with a cargo vessel in Shitalakhsya River near the capital Dhaka.
- 17 April - While workers in a coal power plant in Chittagong are holding a protest over their unpaid wages, the police storm them and open fire, 5 workers are killed, and 15 are injured in the police firing.

=== May and June ===
- 9 June - A large fire destroys over 500 homes in a slum in Mohakhali.
- 27 June - Seven people were killed and more than a hundred were injured after an explosion in Dhaka.

=== July and August ===
- 8 July - At least 52 people were killed by a fire at a food and drink factory in Rupganj.
- 9 August - Bangladesh wins the 5-match T20I cricket series against Australia 4–1. In the final match, Australia lost while registering their lowest ever T20I score of 62.

=== September and October ===
- 29 September - Murder of Mohibullah
- Communal violence rocked the country during and after the Durga Puja festival, from 13 to 22 October. The government took necessary measures to ensure the arrest of those responsible for the violence.

=== November and December ===
- 12 November - Political violence between rival political factions during the 2021 Union Parishad elections resulted in the death of 7 people.
- 6 December – Cyclone Jawad caused heavy rain in the region.
- 16 December – Bangladesh celebrates 50 years of Victory in the 1971 Bangladesh War of Independence.
- 24 December – A fire on a ferry kills about 40 people.

=== Awards and recognitions ===
==== International recognition ====
- In August, the Ramon Magsaysay Award was presented to Firdausi Qadri, a Bangladeshi scientist specializing in immunology and infectious disease research, working as a director for the Centre for Vaccine Sciences of the International Centre for Diarrhoeal Disease and Research, Bangladesh (icddr,b).

==== Independence Day Award ====
Total 9 persons and 1 organisation were awarded.

Recipients	Area	Note
AKM Bazlur Rahman	independence and liberation war	posthumous
Ahsanullah Master	independence and liberation war	posthumous
Brigadier General Khushid Uddin Ahmed	independence and liberation war	posthumous
Akhtaruzzaman Chowdhury Babu	independence and liberation war	posthumous
Mrinmoy Guha Neogi	science and technology	
Mahadev Saha	literature	
Ataur Rahman	culture	
Gazi Mazharul Anwar	culture	
M. Amjad Hossain	social work	
Bangladesh Agricultural Research Council	research and training	

==== Ekushey Padak ====
It was awarded to 21 persons.

1. Motahar Hossain Talukdar, language movement (posthumous)
2. Md. Shamsul Haque, language movement (posthumous)
3. Afsar Uddin Ahmed, language movement (posthumous)
4. Papia Sarwar, music
5. Raisul Islam Asad, performing arts
6. Salma Begum Sujata, performing arts
7. Ahmed Iqbal Haider, drama
8. Syed Salahuddin Zaki, film
9. Bhaskar Bandopandhay, recitation
10. Pavel Rahman, photography
11. Golam Hasnayen, Liberation War
12. Fazlur Rahman Faruque, Liberation War
13. Syeda Issabela, Liberation War (posthumous)
14. Ajoy Dasgupta, journalism
15. Samir Kumar Saha, research
16. Mahfuza Khanam, education
17. Mirza Abdul Jalil, economics
18. Kazi Kamruzzaman, social service
19. Quazi Rosy, language and literature
20. Bulbul Chowdhury, language and literature
21. Ghulam Murshid, language and literature

== Deaths ==
- 3 January — Rabeya Khatun, novelist (b. 1935).
- 20 February — ATM Shamsuzzaman, actor (b. 1941).
- 16 March — Moudud Ahmed, politician (b. 1940).
- 7 April — Indra Mohan Rajbongshi, singer (b. 1946).
- 11 April — Mita Haque, singer (b. 1962).
- 14 April — Abdul Matin Khasru, politician (b. 1950).
- 17 April — Kabori Sarwar, film actress and politician (b. 1950).
- 18 April — Mesbahuddin Ahmed a.k.a. Wasim, film actor (b. 1947).
- 22 June — Mohiuddin Ahmed, publisher and founder of The University Press Limited (b.1944)
- 23 July — Fakir Alamgir, singer (b. 1950).
- 31 August — Bashir Al Helal, novelist (b. 1936).
- 24 September — Ustad Julhas Uddin Ahmed, singer (b. 1933).
- 11 October — Enamul Haque, actor (b. 1943).
- 15 November — Hasan Azizul Huq, novelist (b. 1939).
