= 2025 in Bangladesh =

- Centuries: 20th; 21st
- Decades: 2000s; 2010s; 2020s
- See also: Other events of 2025; List of years in Bangladesh

The following is a list of events for the year 2025 in Bangladesh. 2025 (MMXXV) was a common year starting on Wednesday of the Gregorian calendar, the 2025th year of the Common Era (CE) and Anno Domini (AD) designations, the 25th year of the 3rd millennium and the 21st century, and the 6th year of the 2020s decade.

It will follow 1431 and 1432 Baṅgābda (Bengali Year).

The year 2025 is the 54th year of the independence of Bangladesh.

== Incumbents ==
=== National government ===
| Photo | Post | Name |
|---|---|---|
| | President of Bangladesh | Mohammed Shahabuddin (Age 75) |
| | Prime Minister of Bangladesh | Vacant |
| | Chief Adviser of Bangladesh | Muhammad Yunus (Age 84) |
| | Speaker of the Jatiya Sangsad | Vacant |
| | Chief Justice of Bangladesh | Syed Refaat Ahmed (Age 66) |
| | Cabinet Secretary of Bangladesh | Sheikh Abdur Rashid (Age 67) |
| | Chief Election Commissioner of Bangladesh | AMM Nasir Uddin (Age 71) |
| | Jatiya Sangsad | 12th Jatiya Sangsad (dissolved on 6 August 2024) |

== Events ==
=== January ===
- 15 January — The Supreme Court of Bangladesh overturns the 2018 conviction of former prime minister Khaleda Zia for graft in a case involving an orphanage trust.
- 16 January – Former home minister Lutfozzaman Babar, who was accused in the 2004 arms and ammunition haul case, is released from prison after serving 17 1/2 years.
- 27 January – Clashes break out between Dhaka University students and students of seven colleges affiliated with the university demanding separation.
- 28 January – A strike is called by the Bangladesh Railway Running Staff and Workers Union as part of their demands for increased pensions and other benefits, causing nationwide disruptions.

=== February ===
- 5–6 February — The Bangabandhu Memorial Museum, the repurposed former residence of Bangladesh's first prime minister Sheikh Mujibur Rahman, is demolished by protesters demonstrating against his daughter, former prime minister Sheikh Hasina.
- 6 February — The Bangladeshi government summons Indian acting high commissioner Pawan Badhe after Sheikh Hasina's speech from India, where she claimed that she was forced to flee because of Islamist mobs at her residence.
- 8–9 February — Over 1,000 people are arrested in Operation Devil Hunt.
- 12 February — The OHCHR report on 2024 protests in Bangladesh is published, with findings of the previous Sheikh Hasina administration behind possible "crimes against humanity" during its suppression of the July uprising in 2024.
- 24 February — A group of residents attacks a Bangladesh Air Force base in Cox's Bazar following an altercation between soldiers and a civilian motorist, leaving at least one person dead.
- 28 February — A new political party is formed by the student leadership of the July Revolution.

=== March ===
- 7 March — A protest organised by members of the banned Islamist group Hizb-ut-Tahrir in Dhaka is dispersed by Dhaka Metropolitan Police using tear gas and sound grenades. The procession demands the establishment of an Islamic caliphate in the country.
- 13 March — An eight-year-old girl dies from injuries sustained after being raped in Magura on the night of 5 March, sparking nationwide protests.
- 14 March — UN Secretary-General António Guterres visits the Rohingya refugee camps in Cox's Bazar. He pledges to prevent food ration cuts following funding shortfalls from the World Food Programme.
- 17 March — The interim government announces plans to host an international conference on the Rohingya crisis, scheduled for September or October 2025.
- 18 March — Ataullah abu Ammar Jununi, the leader of the Arakan Rohingya Salvation Army, is arrested in Narayanganj District, Dhaka Division.

=== April ===
- 2 April — A microbus collides with a bus in Lohagara Upazila, Chittagong, killing 10 people and injuring three others.
- 12 April — The March for Gaza is held in Suhrawardy Udyan, Dhaka, with an estimated attendance of 100,000 people, and being the largest pro-Palestine movement in the country's history.
- 13 April — The Anti-Corruption Commission issues an arrest warrant against British MP Tulip Siddiq as part of an investigation into her alleged involvement in corruption during the premiership of her aunt, Sheikh Hasina.
- 17 April — Bangladesh-Pakistan diplomatic talks resume after a 15-year hiatus. Discussions include Bangladesh's demand for a formal apology and $4.52 billion in compensation for the 1971 war atrocities. Both nations express willingness to enhance cooperation in various sectors.
- 20 April
  - Zahidul Islam Parvez, a student of Primeasia University, is fatally stabbed near the university campus in Banani, Dhaka, following an altercation. A murder case is filed against eight individuals, including two leaders of the Students Against Discrimination. Six suspects, including the prime accused, are arrested.
  - The Zimbabwe Cricket Team begins a two-Test match series tour against Bangladesh, marking their first Test tour to the country in five years. The series is scheduled to run until 2 May 2025.
- 22 April – Federation Cup Final is held between Dhaka Abahani and Bashundhara Kings at the Rafiq Uddin Bhuiyan Stadium in Mymensingh. The match is stopped on a 1–1 scoring and suspended due to poor lighting, the remaining playtime resumes on 29 April 2025.
- 23 April
  - Bangladesh becomes the 94th member of World Lacrosse, and the 21st from the Asia-Pacific region. The development aligns with the sport's broader international expansion ahead of its scheduled return to the 2028 Olympic Games.
  - The World Bank and the Government of Bangladesh sign two agreements totaling $850 million. Of this, $650 million is allocated for the Bay Terminal Marine Infrastructure Development Project in Chittagong, while $200 million will support social protection programs targeting vulnerable populations.
- 25 April – Bangladesh issues a presidential ordinance to split the National Board of Revenue (NBR) into two distinct directorates — one for tax, one for customs. This is done in response to the International Monetary Fund's demand for structural reform.
- 26 April
  - Bangladesh Jamaat-e-Islami participates in discussions with the National Consensus Commission regarding the country's ongoing political reforms.
  - Over 550 undocumented Bangladeshi nationals are detained in Gujarat, India, during a crackdown on illegal immigration. Many of them are found residing with forged documents.
  - Pakistani golfers Parkha Ijaz and Aania Farooq win the women's team and singles events at the 38th Bangladesh Amateur Golf Championship held in Dhaka.
- 28 April – The Bangladesh Meteorological Department issues a severe heatwave alert as temperatures soar above 40 °C in multiple districts.
- 29 April – The 2025 Federation Cup Final resumes after being suspended on 22 April due to poor lighting with a score of 1-1. After extra time, Bashundhara Kings defeat Dhaka Abahani 5–3 on penalties and win their 4th title.

=== May ===
- 6 May – Former Prime Minister and chairperson of the Bangladesh Nationalist Party, Khaleda Zia, returns from London after four months of medical treatment.
- 8 May – Former President Mohammad Abdul Hamid leaves the country and goes to Thailand.
- 9 May – National Citizen Party, Bangladesh Jamaat-e-Islami, Gono Odhikar Parishad, and other political parties gather at Shahbag to call for a ban on the Awami League.
- 10 May – The interim government imposes a ban on activities by the Awami League.
- 17 May – India bans Bangladeshi ready-made garments from being exported through their common land borders.
- 27 May – The Supreme Court overturns the 2014 conviction and death sentence of Bangladesh Jamaat-e-Islami leader ATM Azharul Islam for crimes against humanity committed during the Bangladesh Liberation War.

=== June ===
- 1 June –
  - The trial in absentia of former Prime Minister Sheikh Hasina, for the suppression of protests against her government, begins in the International Crimes Tribunal (ICT).
  - The Supreme Court overturns the 2013 cancellation of registration imposed on the Bangladesh Jamaat-e-Islami.
- 2 June – Finance Adviser Salehuddin Ahmed presents a budget of ৳7,90,000 crore for the fiscal year 2025–26, which is 0.88% lower than the previous fiscal year's budget.
- 29 June – The Port of Chittagong closes operations due to a strike by National Board of Revenue employees protesting against plans to split the agency. The port reopens the next day following negotiations between the strikers and the finance ministry.

=== July ===
- 2 July –
  - The ICT sentences former Prime Minister Sheikh Hasina in absentia to six months' imprisonment for contempt of court.
  - The July Mass Uprising Day is declared a holiday.
- 16 July – Four people are killed in an attack by the banned Awami League on a convoy carrying leaders of the National Citizen Party in Gopalganj.
- 21 July – 2025 Dhaka fighter jet crash: An F-7 BGI training aircraft of the Bangladesh Air Force crashes into Milestone College in Uttara, Dhaka, killing 32 people, including the pilot, and injuring 171 others.
- 24 July – Former chief justice A. B. M. Khairul Haque is arrested in Dhanmondi, Dhaka.
- 31 July – A boarding bridge tire explodes during maintenance works at Osmani International Airport in Sylhet, killing an airport worker and injuring another.

=== August ===
- 5 August – Chief Adviser Muhammad Yunus unveils the July Declaration.
- 7 August – Asaduzzaman Tuhin, a journalist working for the newspaper Dainik Protidiner Kagoj, is killed by a suspected gang in Gazipur.
- 12 August – Five fishermen are abducted by the Arakan Army from the Naf River estuary in Teknaf, Cox's Bazar District.
- 15 August – Kongchainyo Marma, the head of the northern armed wing of the Mog Liberation Party, is killed in an army raid in Shantinagar, Khagrachhari Sadar Upazila.
- 17 August –
  - Former Awami League MP Shafiqul Islam Opu is arrested in Dhanmondi, Dhaka.
  - My TV chair Md. Nasir Uddin is arrested in Gulshan, Dhaka, on charges related to the July Uprising.
- 24 August – A two-day international conference on the Rohingya refugee crisis opens in Cox's Bazar, with officials, foreign ministers, United Nations representatives, and envoys in attendance.
- 30 August – The Jatiya Party's headquarters is set on fire and vandalized by members of Gono Odhikar Parishad in Dhaka.

=== September ===
- 5 September – One person is killed in an attack by Islamists on the grave of a cleric whose remains are also disinterred and set on fire in Rajbari District.
- 18 September – Seven political parties, including Jamaat-e-Islami and Islami Andolan Bangladesh, hold large rallies in Dhaka demanding full implementation of the July National Charter, introduction of proportional representation in the polls, electoral fairness, trials for oppression, mass killings and corruption under the previous government, and banning the activities of the Jatiya Party and the 14-party alliance.
- 26 September – Gang rape of an indigenous schoolgirl leads to a series of violent confrontations in Khagrachhari.

=== October ===
- 6 October – The interim government declares 7 October and 25 February as national days to commemorate important historical events.
- 14 October – At least 16 people are killed in a fire at a garment factory and a chemical warehouse in Mirpur Thana in Dhaka.
- 17 October – The July Charter is signed.
- 18 October –
  - A major fire breaks out at the cargo terminal of Hazrat Shahjalal International Airport in Dhaka, leading to a suspension of operations.
  - A lightering ship capsizes at Chattogram Port.
- 27 October – One person is killed while two others are injured by two falling bearing pads from the Dhaka Metro Rail in Farmgate.

=== November ===
- 9 November – Bangladesh Udichi Shilpigoshthi stage a protest in Dhaka near the residence of interim leader Muhammad Yunus against the government's decision to cancel teacher recruitment in primary schools.
- 17 November – Former prime minister Sheikh Hasina, former home minister Asaduzzaman Khan, and former IGP Chowdhury Abdullah Al-Mamun are convicted in absentia by the International Crimes Tribunal of Bangladesh for crimes against humanity related to the July massacre. Hasina and Khan are sentenced to death, while Al-Mamun receives a five-year prison term.
- 19 November – Bangladesh wins 1-0 against India in an AFC Asian Cup qualification match for the first time in 22 years.
- 21 November – A 5.7-magnitude earthquake hits Dhaka, killing at least 10 people and injuring over 600.
- 25 November – A massive fire destroys 1,500 homes in the Korail slum in Dhaka.
- 27 November – Former Prime Minister Sheikh Hasina is convicted in absentia and sentenced to 21 years' imprisonment for illegally securing plots of land in Purbachal for herself and her family.

=== December ===
- 1 December – Former Prime Minister Sheikh Hasina, her sister Sheikh Rehana, and niece, British MP Tulip Siddiq, are convicted in absentia and sentenced to up to seven years' imprisonment for illegally securing a lot in a government land project.
- 8 December – Bangladesh wins the junior men's hockey world cup after defeating Austria.
- 12 December – Inqilab Moncho politician Osman Hadi is shot in the head by assailants on a motorbike. He dies while undergoing treatment at a Singapore hospital on 18 December.
- 18 December –
  - The death of Osman Hadi, cultural activist and young politician, triggers nationwide protests and riots.
  - A Hindu youth is lynched by a mob in Bhaluka, Mymensingh, following allegations of religious insult. After the killing, his body is tied to a tree and set on fire.
- 19 December – Mobs attack, vandalize, and set fire to the offices of the newspapers Prothom Alo and the Daily Star as well as Sheikh Mujibur Rahman's house at Dhanmondi 32, and Chhayanaut Sanskriti Bhavan.
- 21 December – An Indian Border Security Force Jawan was detained by Border Guard Bangladesh after he crossed into Bangladesh.
- 25 December – BNP leader Tarique Rahman returns to Bangladesh for the first time since going into exile in the United Kingdom since 2008.
- 27 December – Four people are injured in an explosion at a madrasa in Hasnabad, South Keraniganj, Dhaka. Police later seize around 250 kilograms of bomb-making materials, crude explosives, and chemicals from the scene.

== Holidays ==
- 15 February – Shab-e-Barat
- 21 February – Language Movement Day
- 26 March – Independence Day
- 28 March – Night of Power
- 28 March – Jumu'atul-Wida
- 31 March – Eid al-Fitr
- 1–2 April – Eid al-Fitr Holiday
- 14 April – Pohela Boishakh
- 1 May – May Day
- 5 May – Buddha's Birthday
- 6 June – Eid al-Adha
- 7–8 June – Eid al-Adha Holiday
- 6 July – Ashura
- 5 August – July Mass Uprising Day
- 16 August – Krishna Janmashtami
- 5 September – Mawlid
- 2 October – Vijayadashami
- 16 December – Victory Day
- 25 December – Christmas

== Deaths ==
=== January ===
- 2 January –
  - Kabira Uddina Ahmed, politician, MP (1996).
  - Arun Roy, 56, film director.
- 4 January – Anjana Sultana, 69, actress
- 5 January –
  - Anisur Rahman, 91, economist
  - S. A. Khaleque, politician
  - Prabir Mitra, 81, actor
- 15 January –
  - Subhagata Choudhury, 78, non-fiction writer.
  - M. Azizul Haq, 84, police officer, inspector general (1996–1997).
- 20 January – Asma Khatun, 90, politician, MP (1991–1995).
- 21 January – Faizul Islam, 61, writer and administrator.
- 26 January – Major General (Ret.) K. M. Shafiullah, 90, 2nd Chief of Army Staff
- 28 January – Abdul Momen Talukder, 72, politician, MP (2001–2014).

=== February ===
- 3 February – Enam Ahmed Chowdhury, 87, civil servant.
- 9 February – Mohammad Abdur Rouf, 91, 5th Chief Election Commissioner of Bangladesh
- 24 February – Zahidur Rahman Anjan, 60, film director (Meghmallar).
- 25 February – Abdullah Al Noman, 82, politician, twice MP, minister of food (2002–2004) and fisheries (2004–2006).

=== March ===
- 8 March – A. H. M. Touhidul Anowar Chowdhury, 87, gynaecologist and obstetrician.
- 12 March – Syed Manzur Elahi, 83, businessman.
- 13 March – A. A. M. S. Arefin Siddique, 71, academic administrator, vice-chancellor of the University of Dhaka (2009–2017).
- 19 March – Kazi Shahidullah, 72, academic administrator, vice-chancellor of NU (2009–2013) and chairman of the UGC (2019–2024).
- 25 March – Sanjida Khatun, 91, musicologist.

=== April ===
- 4 April – Ataullah Hafezzi, 77, Islamic scholar and political leader
- 12 April – Shamsunnahar Khwaja Ahsanullah, 90, politician and member of the Dhaka Nawab family
- 14 April – Ahmad Shamsul Islam, 100, botanist and educator

=== May ===
- 10 May – Mustafa Zaman Abbasi, 88, musicologist.

=== July ===
- 5 July – A. T. M. Shamsul Huda, 83, 10th Chief Election Commissioner of Bangladesh.
- 31 July – Yasmeen Murshed, 80, political adviser and teacher, founder of Scholastica.

=== August ===
- 3 August – M. Shamsher Ali, 87, astrophysicist and academic administrator, president of the Bangladesh Academy of Sciences (2004–2012), vice-chancellor of BOU (1992–1996) and SEU (2002–2010).
- 4 August – M. Harun-Ar-Rashid, 75, military officer, chief of army staff (2000–2002).
- 12 August – Mahfuza Khanam, 79, academic administrator, president of the Asiatic Society of Bangladesh (2018–2021).
- 13 August – Jatin Sarker, 88, writer and educationist.

=== September ===
- 7 September – Badruddin Umar, 93, political activist.
- 14 September – Hafez Ahmadullah, 84, Islamic scholar, chairman of Anjuman-e-Ittihadul Madaris Bangladesh (since 2024).

=== December ===
- 18 December – Osman Hadi, politician.
- 20 December – A K Khandker, 95, air force officer, chief of air staff (1972–1975), minister of finance (1987–1990) and twice MP.
- 30 December – Khaleda Zia, 80, prime minister (1991–1996, 2001–2006), first lady (1977–1981), and three-time MP.
- 31 December – Mahmudul Hasan, 89, army officer, minister of home affairs (1986, 1989–1990) and MP (2001–2008).
