= 2026 in Bangladesh =

- Centuries: 20th; 21st
- Decades: 2000s; 2010s; 2020s
- See also: Other events of 2026; List of years in Bangladesh

The following is a list of scheduled and expected events for the year 2026 in Bangladesh. 2026 (MMXXVI) is the current year, and is a common year starting on Thursday of the Gregorian calendar, the 2026th year of the Common Era (CE) and Anno Domini (AD) designations, the 26th year of the 3rd millennium and the 21st century, and the 7th year of the 2020s decade.

It will follow 1432 and 1433 Baṅgābda (Bengali Year).

The year 2026 will be the 55th year after the independence of Bangladesh.

== Incumbents ==
=== National government ===
Photo	Post	Name
	President of Bangladesh	Mohammed Shahabuddin (until 24 July) (Age 76)
	President of Bangladesh	Hafiz Uddin Ahmad (acting, until 21 August) (Age 81)
	President of Bangladesh	Mirza Fakhrul Islam Alamgir (since 21 August) (Age 77)
	Prime Minister of Bangladesh	Tarique Rahman (since 17 February) (Age 60)
	Chief Adviser of Bangladesh	Muhammad Yunus (until 17 February) (Age 84)
	Speaker of the Jatiya Sangsad	Hafiz Uddin Ahmad (since 12 March) (Age 81)
	Chief Justice of Bangladesh	Zubayer Rahman Chowdhury (Age 64)
	Cabinet Secretary of Bangladesh	Sheikh Abdur Rashid (until 17 February) (Age 67)
	Cabinet Secretary of Bangladesh	Md. Siraj Uddin Miah (since 17 February)
	Chief Election Commissioner of Bangladesh	AMM Nasir Uddin (Age 71)
	Jatiya Sangsad	13th Jatiya Sangsad (since 17 February)

== Events ==
=== January ===
- 4 January – The interim government bans the broadcasting of the 2026 Indian Premier League in Bangladesh following the exclusion of Bangladeshi cricketer Mustafizur Rahman from the Kolkata Knight Riders by the Board of Control for Cricket in India.
- 12 January – The Border Guard Bangladesh detains 53 Arakan Rohingya Salvation Army members after they crossed into Bangladeshi territory amid fighting with the Arakan Army in Rakhine State, Myanmar.

=== February ===
- 2 February – Sheikh Hasina, Tulip Siddiq and two other relatives of the former prime minister are sentenced to up to 10 years' imprisonment over the illegal procurement of properties in Purbachal.
- 6 February – The World Health Organization confirms a fatal case of Nipah virus in Rajshahi Division.
- 12 February –
  - 2026 Bangladeshi general election: The Bangladesh Nationalist Party wins a two-thirds majority in the Jatiya Sangsad.
  - 2026 Bangladeshi constitutional referendum: A motion to approve the July Charter passes with 60.26% of the vote.
- 13 February – Six fishermen are abducted from a dry fish processing camp by pirates in Shelarchar in the East Sundarbans.
- 17 February – Tarique Rahman is inaugurated as prime minister.
- 23 February – Seven people are killed and two others are injured in a gas explosion at a house in Halishahar Thana, Chittagong.
- 26 February – A court in Dhaka orders the government to petition Interpol for a red notice against Tulip Siddique.

=== March ===
- 1 March – A woman cuts off a sex harasser's penis with a blade during attempted rape in Joypurhat.
- 7 March – Three people, including a Purohita, are injured in a firebombing at a temple in Comilla.
- 9 March – The government closes all universities and imposes fuel rationing due to energy shortages caused by the 2026 Iran war.
- 12 March –
  - Hafiz Uddin Ahmad is elected as speaker of the Jatiya Sangsad.
  - A Bangladesh Navy bus collides with a microbus carrying wedding guests in Rampal Upazila, Bagerhat District, killing 14 people including 11 from same family with bridegroom and injuring several.
- 18 March – A launch is rear-ended by another launch while picking up passengers in Sadarghat Launch Terminal in Dhaka, killing two people, injuring a pregnant woman and leaving three missing.
- 22 March – A train collides with a bus in Paduar Bazar rail crossing, Comilla Sadar Dakshin Upazila, Comilla District, killing 12 people and injuring at least 15 others.
- 25 March – At least 26 people are killed, 11 others survive and six are reported missing when a passenger bus plunges into the Padma River in Goalanda Upazila, Rajbari District, Dhaka Division.

=== April ===
- 3 April – Bangladesh defeats India to regain the SAFF U-20 title.
- 4 April – Five people are killed in a fire at a gas lighter factory in Keraniganj Upazila, Dhaka District.
- 5 April – Bangladesh launches an emergency MMR vaccine campaign after new health data shows that at least 130 children have been reported dead from measles in the last six weeks.
- 9 April – A trawler carrying migrants capsizes in the Andaman Sea on its way to Malaysia from Teknaf, Cox's Bazar District, leaving 250 passengers missing. Nine people are rescued by the Bangladeshi-flagged vessel M.T. Meghna Pride.

=== May ===
- 2 May – Babar Ali becomes the first Bangladeshi to climb Mount Makalu.
- 19 May – 2026 Pallabi child rape and murder case: Eight-year old Ramisa Akter is raped and murdered in Pallabi, Dhaka by her neighbor 31-year old Sohel Rana, triggering nationwide protests.
- 20 May – Veteran Cricketer Mushfiqur Rahim's century leads Bangladesh to a historic Test cricket series win against Pakistan.
- 25 May – A truck carrying iron rods and hitchhikers overturns in Tangail District, killing 15 people and wounding 10.

=== June ===
- 2 June – Foreign minister Khalilur Rahman is elected as president of the United Nations General Assembly.
- 22 June –
  - A magnitude 4.4 earthquake hits Dhaka Division, injuring one person.
  - A truck plunges into a ditch between Dhaka and Tangail, killing 15 and injuring 10.
- 25 June – The high profile quadruple murder of a mother and her three daughters by fruit vendor Antar Majumdar at their own house in Lakshmipur District. Antar Majumdar is killed on the same day by an enraged mob.

=== July ===
- 13 July – At least 51 people are reported killed following days of flooding caused by heavy rains nationwide.
- 24 July –
  - Mohammed Shahabuddin resigns as President of Bangladesh citing ill health.
  - The United States imposes a 10% tariff on Bangladesh, citing the presence of alleged forced labour in the supply chain.

=== August ===
- 5 August – The July Mass Uprising Memorial Museum is inaugurated by Prime Minister Tarique Rahman.
- 20 August – 2026 Bangladeshi presidential election: Mirza Fakhrul Islam Alamgir is elected president following a 255–88 vote in the Jatiya Sangsad against the LDP candidate Oli Ahmad.

=== October ===
- 2 October – A bus crushes an auto-rickshaw, killing seven people in Mymensingh.
- 20 October – Fourteen people are killed while 20 others are injured in a collision between a bus and a truck in Natore District, Rajshahi Division.

=== November ===
- 10 November – Clashes break out between police and Sheikh Hasina supporters holding nationwide protests, leaving one dead.
- 14–15 November – A strike is held by workers in nearly 150 garment factories nationwide as part of demands for an increase in the minimum wage.
- 15 November – Massive protests are held in Gopalganj district by Awami League supporters.
- 17 November – An Indian Border Security Force personnel who accidentally crossed the unfenced Bangladesh–India border in Sylhet district is briefly detained by Border Guard Bangladesh and is repatriated later that evening following a flag meeting between officials from both sides.

== Deaths ==
=== January ===
- 2 January — Sukumar Barua, 87, poet and rhymester.

=== February ===
- 7 February — Ramesh Chandra Sen, 85, Minister of Water Resources (2009–2014).
- 14 February — Sheikh Kabir Hossain, 84, insurance executive.

=== March ===
- 10 March — Mohiuddin Ahmed, 75, MP (1986–1988).

=== June ===
- June — Tofail Ahmed 82, MP, government minister, Chief Commander of Rakhi Bahini.
- 3 June — A.K.M. Rahmatullah, 75, MP (1986–1987, 1996–2001, 2009–2024).

=== July ===
- 5 July — Abul Kashem Fazlul Haq, 85, writer and academic, president of Bangla Academy (since 2024).
- 12 July — Muhammad Jamiruddin Sircar, 94, barrister, acting president (2002), minister of education (1991–1996), and speaker of the Jatiya Sangsad (2001–2009).

=== October ===
- 2 October — Toufique Imrose Khalidi, 59, journalist, founder of bdnews24.com.
- 15 October – Mohammad Solaiman, 70, vice-chancellor of the UITS (2016–2022) and the USTC (since 2017).

== Holidays ==
- 4 February – Shab-e-Barat
- 21 February – Language Movement Day
- 17 March – Night of Power
- 20 March – Jumu'atul-Wida
- 19-23 March – Eid al-Fitr
- 26 March – Independence Day
- 14 April – Pohela Boishakh
- 1 May – May Day, Buddha's Birthday
- 26-31 May – Eid al-Adha
- 26 June – Ashura
- 5 August – July Mass Uprising Day
- 26 August – Mawlid
- 4 September – Krishna Janmashtami
- 21 October – Vijayadashami
- 16 December – Victory Day
- 25 December – Christmas
