= 2022 in Bangladesh =

- Centuries: 20th; 21st
- Decades: 2000s; 2010s; 2020s
- See also: Other events of 2022; List of years in Bangladesh

2022 (MMXXII) was a common year starting on Saturday of the Gregorian calendar, the 2022nd year of the Common Era (CE) and Anno Domini (AD) designations, the 22nd year of the 3rd millennium and the 21st century, and the 3rd year of the 2020s decade.

== Incumbents ==
| President | Prime Minister | Speaker | Chief Justice | Opposition Leader | Cabinet Secretary |
| Mohammad Abdul Hamid (Age 78) | Sheikh Hasina Wazed (Age 75) | Shirin Sharmin Chaudhury (Age 56) | Hasan Foez Siddique (Age 66) | Rowshan Ershad (Age 79) | Khandker Anwarul Islam |
|---|---|---|---|---|---|
| Bangladesh Awami League (Since 14 March 2013) | Bangladesh Awami League (Since 6 January 2009) | Bangladesh Awami League (Since 1 May 2013) | Independent (Since 31 December 2021) | Jatiya Party (Ershad) (Since 9 September 2019) | Independent (Since 28 October 2019) |

== Events ==
Events in the year 2022 in Bangladesh.

=== January–March ===
- 21 January – The country closes schools, universities, and other equivalent educational institutions until February 6 and bans social, political, religious, and state events gathered more than 100 people amid an alarming spread of the SARS-CoV-2 Omicron variant.

=== April–June ===
- 19 April - Students of Dhaka College violently clash with poor hard working shop keepers of New Market area, in the process setting shops on fire and causing severe traffic congestions in Dhaka City. Police brought the situation under control by late afternoon.
- 4–7 June - 2022 Sitakunda fire.
- 17 June - Narayanganj EPZ fire.
- 17–20 June - Massive flooding hits northeastern districts of Bangladesh leaving millions stranded.
- 25 June - The largest bridge in the country, the Padma Bridge, was inaugurated.

=== July–September ===
- 29 July - Sajid Asbat Khandaker and Sourodip Paul of BRAC University won the World Universities Debating Championship on behalf of Bangladesh.
- 22–30 September - 2022 Eden College Scandal

=== October–December ===
- 20 October - Bangladesh authorities issue travel ban in Bandarban district amidst security concerns in the region.
- 25 October - Cyclone Sitrang
- 19 November - Professor MA Hannan, a Bangladeshi electrical engineer, is listed among the world's most influential scientists.
- 10 December – The prestigious three-match ODI cricket series between Bangladesh and India ends with Bangladesh securing a 2–1 series win over India, despite India's dominating performance in the final match. Bangladeshi player Mehidy Hasan Miraz is named the player of the series for his brilliant performance in the first two games.
- 28 December – The Dhaka Metro Rail and the first phase of the MRT Line 6 are inaugurated by Prime Minister Sheikh Hasina.
- 29 December – Uttara North and Agargaon metro station are opened for operation.

== Deaths ==
=== January ===
- 19 January — Qazi Anwar Hussain, writer and litterateur, creator of the Masud Rana character (b. 1936)

=== February ===
- 20 February — Quazi Rosy, poet and former member of parliament (b. 1949)

=== March ===
- 19 March — Shahabuddin Ahmed, former president and chief justice of Bangladesh (b. 1930).

=== May ===
- 19 May — Abdul Gaffar Chowdhury, writer, journalist, columnist, political analyst and poet (b. 1934)

=== July ===
- 8 July – Sharmili Ahmed, actress (b. 1947)
- 14 July – Kazi Ebadul Haque, justice and language movement veteran (b. 1936)

=== September ===
- 8 September - Akbar Ali Khan, economist (b. 1944)

=== October ===
- 9 October – Samarjit Roy Chowdhury, artist, painter and teacher (b. 1937)
