= 2023 Gulistan explosion =

Explosion in Bangladesh

2023 Dhaka explosion
- Date: 7 March 2023
- Time: 5:00 pm BST
- Location: Dhaka, Bangladesh; 23.7217°N 90.4104°E
- Cause: to be determined
- Deaths: 17
- Injuries: 140

On 7 March 2023, an explosion happened in a market in Dhaka, Bangladesh killing at least 17 people while more than 140 were injured. The explosion took place at around 5:00 p.m local time in a busy market building in Siddiq Bazaar in Old Dhaka.

== Background ==
This was the third explosion in Bangladesh within a week after explosion at an oxygen plant in Sitakunda and another building on Dhaka's Mirpur Road. Similar explosions have occurred in the last two years in Bangladesh, most notably the blast inside a four-storied Moghbazar building that resulted in the collapse and abandonment of the building.

The explosion occurred at a store that sold sanitation materials on the building's ground floor. Authorities were not able to immediately provide the reason behind the explosion.

== Response and casualty ==
More than 140 people were brought to the Dhaka Medical College Hospital. No fire broke out after the explosion. More than 150 firefighters were at the site to assist in rescue efforts. The Rapid Action Battalion (RAB) said that gas accumulated in the basement of the building may have caused the explosion. However, the director of Titas Gas, Mohammed Salim Mia, said that he did not find any evidence for this.
