= 2027 in Bangladesh =

- Centuries: 20th; 21st
- Decades: 2000s; 2010s; 2020s
- See also: Other events of 2027; List of years in Bangladesh

The following is a list of scheduled and expected events for the year 2027 in Bangladesh. 2027 (MMXXVII) is the upcoming year, which will be a common year starting on Friday of the Gregorian calendar, the 2027th year of the Common Era (CE) and Anno Domini (AD) designations, the 27th year of the 3rd millennium and the 21st century, and the 8th year of the 2020s decade.

It will follow 1433 and 1434 Baṅgābda (Bengali Year).

The year 2027 will be the 56th year after the independence of Bangladesh.

== Events ==
=== Scheduled ===
- 21 January – 6 February – 2027 Under-19 Women's T20 World Cup in Bangladesh and Nepal
- 18 June – 4 July – 2027 Asia Cup
