= Khagrachhari (disambiguation) =

Khagrachhari is a town and the administrative headquarters of Khagrachhari District in the Chittagong Hill Tracts of Bangladesh.

Khagrachhari may also refer to:

- 2025 Khagrachhari clashes, a violence in Khagrachhari District
- Khagrachhari Cantonment, a military cantonment in Chittagong Division
- Khagrachhari (Jatiya Sangsad constituency), Constituency of Bangladesh's Jatiya Sangsad
- Khagrachhari District, district in Chattogram Division, Bangladesh
- Khagrachhari Hill District Council, administrative unit in Bangladesh
- Khagrachhari Sadar Upazila, upazila in Chittagong, Bangladesh
- Khagrachhari Stadium, a stadium in Chittagong Division
