= Tawhid Afridi =

Bangladeshi Youtuber (born 1997)

- Born: Tawhid Uddin Afridi; January 3, 1997 (age 29); Dhaka
- Occupation: Youtuber

YouTube information
- Channel: TAWHID AFRIDI
- Years active: 2015-present
- Genre: Vloger
- Subscribers: 6.31 million
- Views: 615 million
- Last updated: 21 September 2025

Tawhid Uddin Afridi (Bengali: তৌহিদ উদ্দিন আফ্রিদি; born 3 January 1997) is a Bangladeshi YouTuber and internet personality.

== Early life and career ==
Tawhid Afridi was born on January 3, 1997, in Dhaka, Bangladesh. He is the son of Nasir Uddin Sathi, chairman of the private Bangladeshi television channel MyTV and a member of the central committee of the Awami League. Afridi finished his schooling in his hometown and he studied in Dhaka College. Afridi launched his YouTube channel on 3 February 2015.

== Controversy ==
When pictures and videos of his closeness with actress Prarthana Fardin Dighi went viral on social media, some media outlets reported rumors of their romance. However, Dighi has repeatedly clarified that they are just good friends.

=== 2024 murder case ===
On 24 August 2025, he was arrested by the Detective Branch of Dhaka Metropolitan Police in a case filed with Jatrabari Police Station over the killing of Asadul Haque Babu during the July uprising. A Dhaka court granted five days of remand for questioning Tawhid Afridi.

During the July 2024 student movement, he carried out pro-government propaganda, and his speeches and activities incited violence against the protesters.

On 25 August 2025, at the Chief Metropolitan Magistrate Court in Dhaka, state prosecutor Advocate Nayan claimed that Tawhid Afridi had recorded nude videos of students during the movement.

Tanvir Rahi complained that Tawhid Afridi is one thing in front of the camera, but completely different behind it. Off camera, he is an absolutely 'terrible' person. He also said that many in the YouTube world were afraid of Afridi like a tiger.

He was arrested on 24 August 2025 and remanded for five days; the case involves allegations related to the death of activist Dayal Beya.

== Awards ==
Award	Result	Ref.
CJFB Performance Award 2021 Best YouTuber	Won	
Channel i Digital Media Award	Won	
