= 2024 in Bangladesh =

- Centuries: 20th; 21st
- Decades: 2000s; 2010s; 2020s
- See also: Other events of 2024; List of years in Bangladesh

The following is a list of events of the year 2024 in Bangladesh. 2024 (MMXXIV) was a leap year starting on Monday of the Gregorian calendar, the 2024th year of the Common Era (CE) and Anno Domini (AD) designations, the 24th year of the 3rd millennium and the 21st century, and the 5th year of the 2020s decade.

It follows 1430 and 1431 Baṅgābda (Bengali Year). The year 2024 is the 53rd year of the independence of Bangladesh. The year is best known for the July Revolution, where country's longest-serving prime minister Sheikh Hasina was overthrown.

== Incumbents ==
=== National government ===
Photo	Post	Name
	President of Bangladesh	Mohammed Shahabuddin (Age 74)
	Prime Minister of Bangladesh	Sheikh Hasina (resigned and self-imposed exile on 5 August) (Age 76) Vacant (since 5 August)
	Chief Adviser of Bangladesh	Muhammad Yunus (since 8 August) (Age 84)
	Speaker of the Jatiya Sangsad	Shirin Sharmin Chaudhury (until 2 September) (Age 57) Vacant (since 2 September)
	Chief Justice of Bangladesh	Obaidul Hassan (until 10 August) (Age 65); Syed Refaat Ahmed (since 10 August) (Age 65)
	Cabinet Secretary of Bangladesh	Md. Mahbub Hossain (until 13 October) (Age 59) Sheikh Abdur Rashid (since 14 October)
	Chief Election Commissioner of Bangladesh	Kazi Habibul Awal (until 5 September) (Age 68) AMM Nasir Uddin (since 22 November)
	Jatiya Sangsad	12th Jatiya Sangsad (dissolved in 6 August)

== Events ==
=== January ===
- 1 January — Nobel laureate Muhammad Yunus is convicted for violating the country's labour laws. He and three others from Grameen Telecom are each sentenced to six-months in jail by Dhaka's labour court; and subsequently given one-month bail on the condition of appealing against the verdict. Following an appeal, the convictions are overturned on 7 August.
- 5 January – Five people are killed in a suspected arson attack on the Benapole Express train in the Gopibagh area of Dhaka.
- 7 January :
  - 2024 Bangladeshi general election: The Awami League led by Prime Minister Sheikh Hasina wins a fourth term in government amid a boycott from opposition parties.
  - A fire in the Kutupalong refugee camp destroys hundreds of shelters and facilities and displaces nearly 4,000 Rohingya refugees.

=== February ===
- 5 February: A resident of Bandarban district is killed by cross-border shelling in a spillover effect of the Myanmar Civil War that also sees the entry of an armed Burmese faction into Bangladesh.
- 29 February: At least 43 people are killed in a fire in a building in Dhaka.

=== March ===
- 15 March: The Bangladesh ship MV Abdullah along with its crew is captured and held hostage by Somali pirates.

=== April ===
- 10 April: Fifty-five Kuki-Chin National Front militants are arrested by the Bangladesh Police in Bandarban.
- 15 April: The MV Abdullah and its crew is released by Somali pirates after 32 days in captivity.

=== May ===
- 16 May: nine Bangladeshi youths are named in the prestigious "Forbes 30 under 30 Asia list" an award for young entrepreneurs, leaders, and innovators under the age of 30.
- 22 May: Awami League MP Md. Anwarul Azim Anar is found killed in Kolkata, India after being reported missing since 13 May. Three Bangladeshis are arrested in connection with his death.
- 26 May: Seven people are reported killed and two others reported missing across the country due to Cyclone Remal.

=== June ===
- 6 June: The 2024 Bangladesh quota reform movement begins.
- 19 June: Eight people are killed in mudslides in Cox’s Bazar.

=== July ===
- 2-6 July: Eight people are killed in floods caused by heavy rains across the country.
- 5 July: The completion ceremony of the Padma Bridge is held.
- 9 July: Twenty-six people are charged with environmental crimes for the felling of 560 acres of the Sonadia coastal forest for commercial purposes.
- 15 July: 2024 Bangladesh quota reform movement: The movement turn into violent after Chhatra League, student wing of the ruling party Awami League attacked on the protesters in Dhaka University campus. Students of other universities including Jahangirnagar University were also attacked.
- 16 July: Start of July massacre. At least 6 people were killed including Abu Sayeed and at least 100 others are injured in nationwide clashes between quota reform protesters and the Chhatra League and police.
- 18 July: 2024 Bangladesh quota reform movement: Protesters set fire to the headquarters of the state broadcaster Bangladesh Television in Dhaka.
- 19 July: Police in Dhaka ban all public rallies and protests in the city and impose a nationwide curfew, one day after protestors set fire to government buildings in the city.
- 21 July:
  - The Supreme Court of Bangladesh orders an overhaul to the quota reservation system at the heart of the quota reform protests, increasing merit appointments in the civil service to 93% and reducing slots allotted for descendants of veterans of the 1971 Bangladesh War of Independence to 5%, with the remainder going to ethnic minorities, the disabled and others.
  - A court in the United Arab Emirates sentences 57 Bangladeshis to prison, including three life sentences, for holding protests against the Bangladesh government in the UAE, where protesting is illegal. They are later pardoned by UAE president Mohamed bin Zayed Al Nahyan on 3 September.

=== August ===
- 1 August: The Awami League government bans Bangladesh Jamaat-e-Islami, its student wing, the Bangladesh Islami Chhatra Shibir and its associated bodies on terrorism grounds following their involvement in the 2024 Bangladesh quota reform movement. The ban is lifted by an interim government on 28 August.
- 3 August:
  - 'Officer's Address' of chief of army staff held in Bangladesh Army Headquarters. During the session, based on the opinion of junior officers, the Army Chief declared 'No fire on own people'. Which means army will not fire on innocent citizens further. It was a game changing decision by army, leaving Awami League and Sheikh Hasina helpless.
  - Nahid Islam, coordinator of the Anti-discrimination Student Movement declared one point demand for government's resignation. The non-cooperation movement was also declared until the resignation of the government.
- 4 August: At least 91 people are killed in violent clashes between anti-government protesters and policemen, pro-government activists nationwide. It was the single largest death toll in a day during the movement.
- 5 August:
  - Non-cooperation movement (2024): Sheikh Hasina resigns and flees to India while her official residence is stormed by protesters.
  - The Bangladesh Armed Forces announces that an interim government would be created, while hundreds are killed in violence nationwide.
  - The day is also referred to as July 36 in Bangladesh due to protesters "counting down the month of July until the demands are met", therefore counting 1 August as 32 July.
  - Imprisoned former prime minister and Bangladesh Nationalist Party chair Khaleda Zia is ordered released by President Mohammed Shahabuddin.
- 6 August:
  - President Shahabuddin dissolves the Jatiya Sangsad. and names Nobel Peace Prize laureate Muhammad Yunus as the head of the interim government.
  - Two boats carrying Rohingya refugees from Myanmar capsize off the coast of Teknaf, killing at least 26 people.
- 8 August: Muhammad Yunus is inaugurated as head of the interim government.
- 9 August: Hundreds of people protest in Dhaka against violence targeting the Hindu minority.
- 10 August: Chief Justice Obaidul Hassan resigns after an ultimatum from protesters. He is succeeded by Syed Refaat Ahmed.
- 13 August: A murder complaint is filed at a court in Dhaka against former prime minister Sheikh Hasina and six other government officials, including former Home Minister Asaduzzaman Khan and former Transport and Bridges Minister and concurrent Awami League secretary-general Obaidul Quader, regarding the killing of a grocer during the quota reform movement protests on 19 July.
- 14 August: A genocide complaint is filed at the International Crimes Tribunal against former prime minister Sheikh Hasina and nine other government officials, including former Home Minister Asaduzzaman Khan and former Transport and Bridges Minister and concurrent Awami League secretary-general Obaidul Quader, regarding the killings of protesters during the quota reform and non-cooperation movement.
- 25 August: One person is killed and at least 40 others are injured in clashes between protesting Ansar members and students during the siege of the Bangladesh Secretariat.
- 29 August: Chief Advisor Muhammad Yunus signs Bangladesh's accession papers to the International Convention for the Protection of All Persons from Enforced Disappearance.

=== September ===
- 1 September:
  - A bus collides with truck before falling into a ditch in Gopalganj, killing ten people and injuring 15 others.
  - The office of the United Nations High Commissioner for Human Rights announces that it will deploy a fact-finding team to investigate human rights abuses and violations committed by government forces during the quota reform movement, after being requested to do so by the interim government of Muhammad Yunus.
- 3 September: At least 71 people are reported killed following days of flooding in 11 districts nationwide.
- 17 September: Ekattorer Ghatak Dalal Nirmul Committee President Shahriar Kabir is arrested in Dhaka on charges of crimes against humanity, mass killing, and murder for his involvement with Sheikh Hasina's government during the quota reform movement.
- 18 September: Tofazzal Hossain is lynched at the University of Dhaka on suspicion of stealing a smartphone.

=== October ===
- 10 October: The Myanmar Navy opens fire at Bangladeshi fishing trawlers near St. Martin's Island, killing a fisherman. It subsequently detains six of the vessels along with their crew.
- 15 October: Chandika Hathurusingha is suspended as head coach of the Bangladesh national cricket team by the Bangladesh Cricket Board for misconduct following allegations that he had assaulted a member of the national team. He is replaced by Phil Simmons for a tenure lasting until the ICC Champions Trophy in February 2025.
- 17 October: The International Crimes Tribunal issues an arrest warrant against Sheikh Hasina for "crimes against humanity" made during the July and August protests.
- 23 October:
  - At least 30 individuals including 25 police officers are injured as protesters attempt to storm the President's residence during midnight hours.
  - The Bangladesh Chhatra League is designated as a "terrorist organisation" by the interim government.
- 31 October: The central office of the Jatiya Party in Bijoy Nagar, Dhaka, is set on fire by unidentified attackers.

=== November ===
- 21 November: battery-run Autorickshaw drivers and others protest against a High Court order, Protestors clash with law enforcement and block roads in numerous parts of Dhaka including Mohakhali, Khilgaon, Mohammadpur, Agargaon, Gabtoli, Mirpur and Demra and vandalize Army-affiliated establishments.
- 24 November: Three Kuki-Chin National Front militants are killed in an operation by the Bangladesh Army.
- 25 November: Hindu monk Chinmoy Krishna, who also heads an Iskcon-operated religious site named Pundarik Dham in Chittagong, was detained by the Detective Branch (DB) of the Dhaka Metropolitan Police at Hazrat Shahjalal International Airport on Monday at 4:30 p.m. He was charged for sedition.
- 26 November: A lawyer is killed during violent protests over the arrest of Hindu community leader Chinmoy Krishna Das in Chittagong.

=== December ===
- 1 December: The High Court overturns the 2018 conviction of acting Bangladesh Nationalist Party chair Tarique Rahman and 48 others for their involvement in the 2004 Dhaka grenade attack.
- 8 December: Bangladesh wins the 2024 ACC Under-19 Asia Cup.
- 24 December: The interim government formally requests the Indian Ministry of External Affairs to extradite Sheikh Hasina.
- 26 December: A firefighter dies after being struck by a truck while responding to a fire at the Secretariat Office.

== Deaths ==
- 6 January: Zahirul Haque, 89, footballer (Police AC, Mohammedan SC, Pakistan national team).
- 16 January: Rezwan Hossain Siddiqui, 71, journalist, director general of Press Institute of Bangladesh.
- 23 January: Mohammad Rais Uddin, 35, paramilitary officer (Border Guard Bangladesh).
- 4 June: Rishta Laboni Shimana, 38, actress and model.
- 5 July: Ziaur Rahman, 50, chess grandmaster.
- 16 July: Abu Sayed, student activist (Begum Rokeya University).
- 16 July: Md. Wasim Akram, student activist (Chittagong College).
- 18 July: Mir Mugdho, student activist (Bangladesh University of Professionals-BUP).
- 18 July: Farhan Faiyaaz, student activist (Dhaka Residential Model College).
- 18 July: Shaikh Ashabul Yamin, student activist (Military Institute of Science and Technology).
- 19 July: Tahir Zaman Priyo, photo journalist.
- 4 August: Golam Nafiz, student activist (Noubahini College).
- 5 August: Shahariar Khan Aanas, student activist.
- 19 September: Bimal Kar, 87, footballer (Shadhin Bangla, Victoria SC, Chittagong Mohammedan).
- 5 October: A. Q. M. Badruddoza Chowdhury, former president.
- 20 December: A. F. Hassan Ariff, 83, adviser to the interim government of Bangladesh.
