= Harishankar Jaladas =

Bangladeshi novelist (born 1953)

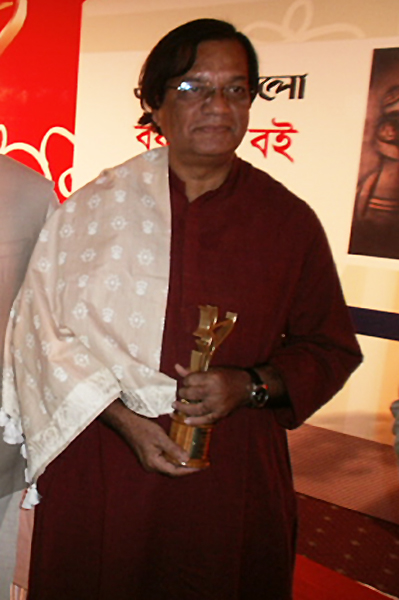
- Born: 3 May 1953 (age 73); Patenga, Chattogram, Bangladesh
- Occupation: Novelist
- Notable work: Dahankal, Ramgolam, Jaloputra, Kosbi and so on
- Awards: Ekushey Padak (2019)

Harishankar Jaladas (born 3 May 1953) is a Bangladeshi novelist. In recognition of his contribution to Bengali language and literature, the government of Bangladesh awarded him the country's second highest civilian award Ekushey Padak in 2019.

== Early life ==
Harishankar Jaladas was born on 12 October 1955 at North Patenga village of Chittagong His father Yudhisthir Jaladas was a fisherman. He completed his secondary education from Patenga High School in 1972 and Higher Secondary education from Chittagong College. In 1982, he obtained his PhD degree from the University of Chittagong. The topic of his research for the PhD was "River based Bangla novels and fishermen's life". He is currently the principal of Government City College, Chittagong.

== Awards ==
- Ekushey Padak (2019)
- Prothom-alo best book award for his Dahankal (2010)
