= My TV (Bangladeshi TV channel) =

Bangladeshi Television channel

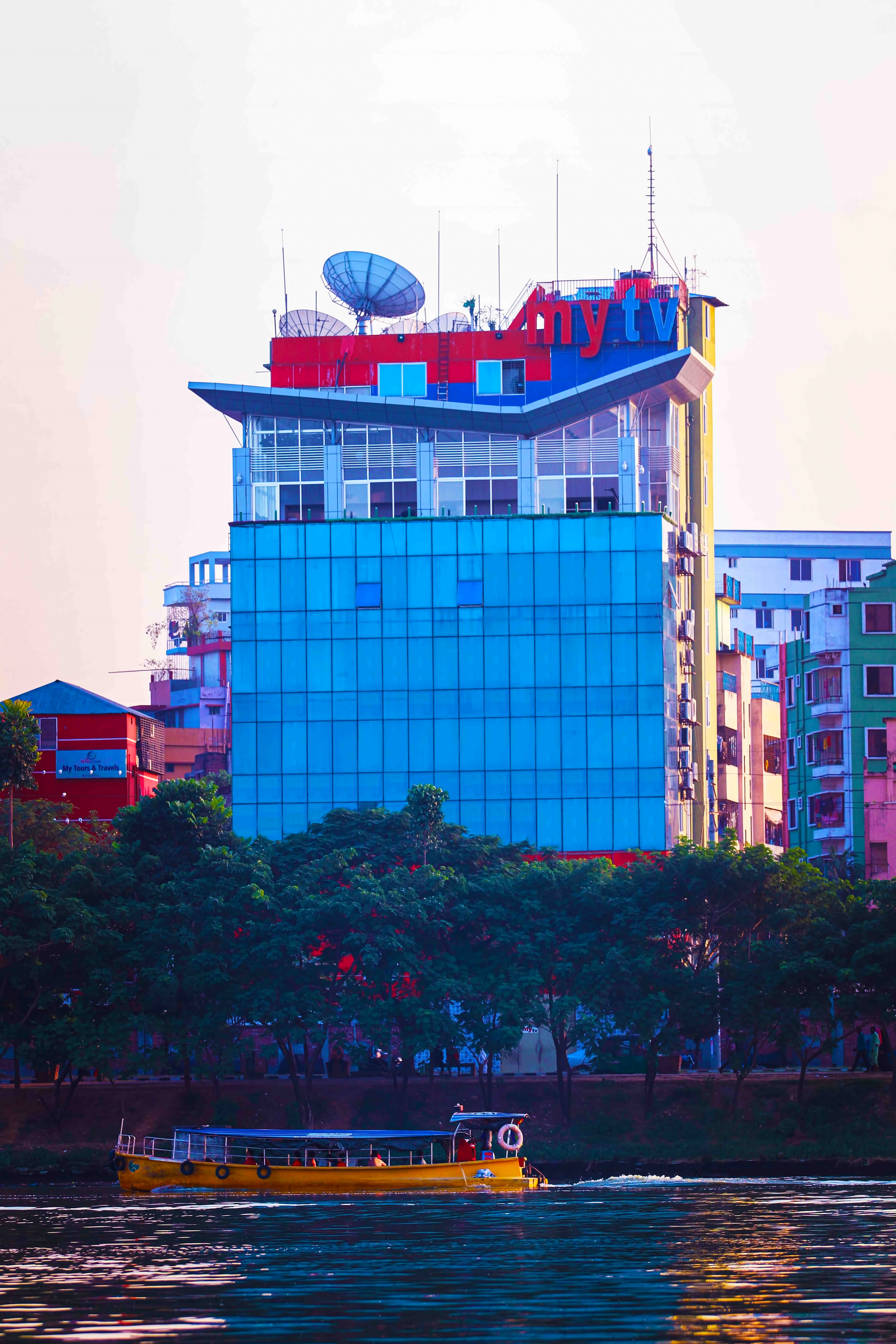
- The headquarter of My TV, known as My TV Bhaban, is in Hatirjheel.
- Country: Bangladesh
- Broadcast area: Nationwide
- Headquarters: Hatirjheel, Dhaka

Programming
- Language: Bengali
- Picture format: 1080i HDTV (downscaled to 16:9 576i for SDTV sets)

Ownership
- Parent: V.M. International Limited
- Key people: Nasir Uddin Sathi (chairman, CEO, and managing director)

History
- Launched: 15 April 2010; 16 years ago
- Founder: Omeda Begum

Links
- Website: mytvbd.tv

My TV (Bengali: মাই টিভি) is a Bangladeshi Bengali-language satellite and cable television channel owned and operated by V.M. International Limited. It began broadcasting on 15 April 2010 and is based in Hatirjheel, Dhaka. My TV was founded by Omeda Begum, claiming to have a goal of spreading the Bengali language and culture. The channel primarily broadcasts entertainment and news programming and is available worldwide.

== History ==
My TV originally began broadcasting in an experimental basis in the mid-2000s, but was later urged to shut down by the caretaker government on 15 March 2007 after test transmissions as it was accused of broadcasting illegally without permission or a no-objection certificate. It later resumed broadcasting with the "Srishtite Bismoy" (সৃষ্টিতে বিস্ময়; lit. 'Excellence in Innovation') slogan on 15 April 2010, after the Bangladesh Telecommunication Regulatory Commission granted them a license to broadcast on 20 October 2009, alongside several other Bangladeshi privately owned television channels.

My TV was available for streaming on phones through Teletalk's 3G services in October 2012. On the occasion of the month of Ramadan, My TV was one of the eight television channels to broadcast the cooking series Pran Premium Ghee Star Cook in July 2014. In 2016, Begum's son, Nasir Uddin Sathi, became the chairman and managing director of My TV. On 19 May 2019, the channel, along with five other channels, began broadcasting via the Bangabandhu-1 satellite after signing an agreement with BSCL.

As a result of massive vandalism against eight television channels that occurred on 5 August 2024 during anti-government protests in Bangladesh, My TV was one of the channels to go off the air temporarily. The channel resumed transmissions afterward. On 1 September 2024, a murder case was filed against the aforementioned chairman of My TV, Sathi, along with his son, Tawhid Afridi. The case also named 23 other individuals, including former Prime Minister Sheikh Hasina. Sathi was arrested over the charges on 17 August 2025.

== Programming ==
- Amar Gaan
- Chobir Hat
- Jadukor
- Music View
- My Songlap
- Rupali Pordar Gaan

== See also ==
- List of television stations in Bangladesh
- List of Bangladeshi television and radio channels
