= Cyclone Remal =

North Indian Ocean cyclone in 2024

Severe Cyclonic Storm Remal
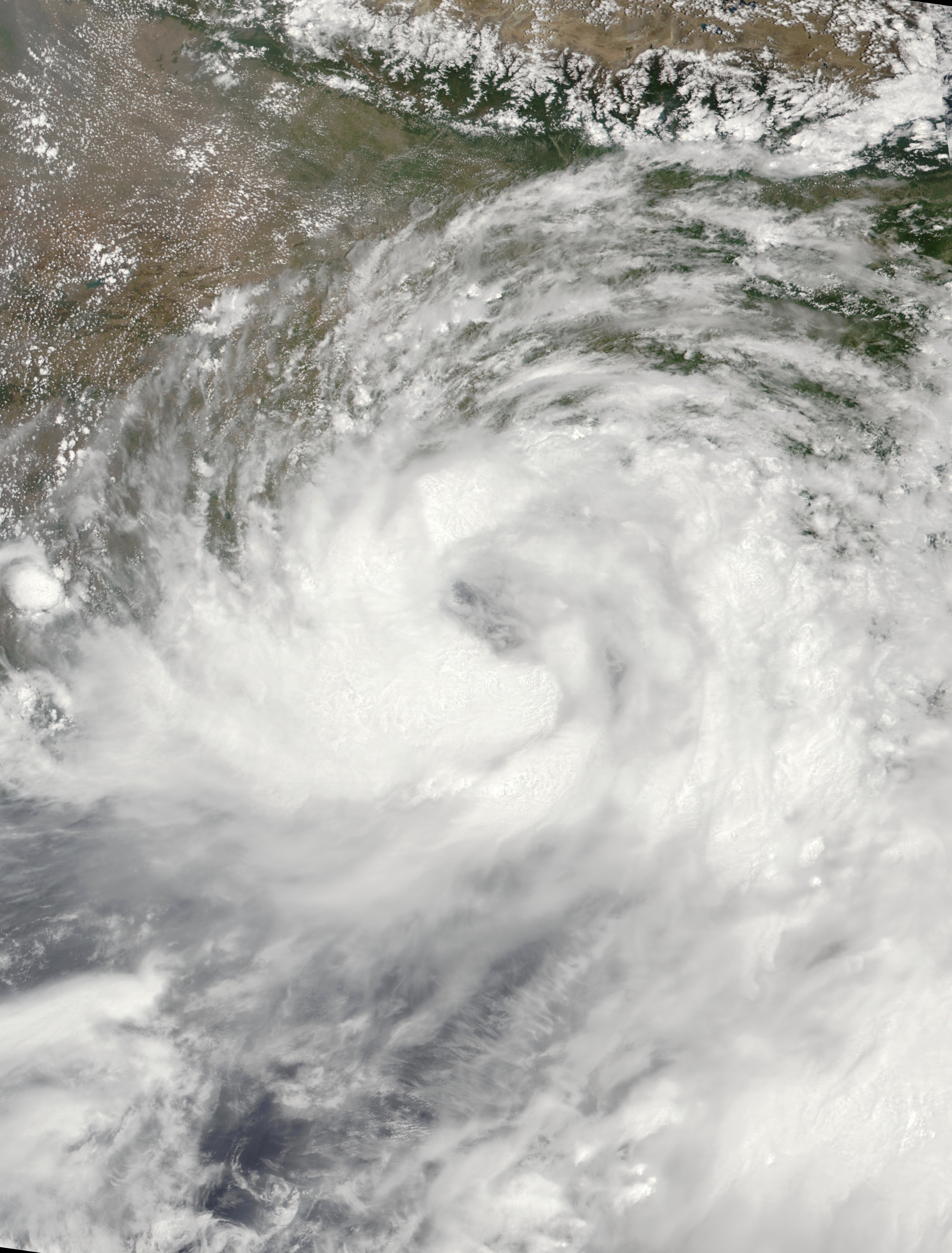
- Remal before its landfall on 26 May

Meteorological history
- Formed: 24 May 2024
- Dissipated: 28 May 2024

Severe cyclonic storm
- 3-minute sustained (IMD)
- Highest winds: 110 km/h (70 mph)
- Highest gusts: 140 km/h (85 mph)
- Lowest pressure: 978 hPa (mbar); 28.88 inHg

Tropical storm
- 1-minute sustained (SSHWS/JTWC)
- Highest winds: 110 km/h (70 mph)
- Lowest pressure: 977 hPa (mbar); 28.85 inHg

Overall effects
- Fatalities: 61+
- Injuries: 137+
- Missing: 8+
- Damage: $637 million (2024 USD)
- Areas affected: West Bengal, Bangladesh, Northeast India, Myanmar
- IBTrACS
- Part of the 2024 North Indian Ocean cyclone season

Severe Cyclonic Storm Remal (Note: The name Remal (Arabic: رمال, [rimaːl]) was contributed by Oman and means "grains of sand" in Arabic.) was a tropical cyclone that affected West Bengal and Bangladesh in late May 2024. This was the first depression and the first cyclonic storm of the 2024 North Indian Ocean cyclone season, it originated from a low-pressure area in the Bay of Bengal and became a cyclonic storm on 25 May. Moving northwards, it intensified into a severe cyclonic storm and reached its peak intensity on 26 May, beginning its landfall process over Bangladesh. It continued moving inland on 27 May losing its convection while northeast of Dhaka. Its center became ragged as it weakened into a depression. On 28 May, it degenerated into a low-pressure area over Meghalaya.

In preparation of the cyclone, multiple airports and ports were closed and their operation temporarily suspended across India and Bangladesh. 800,000 residents in Bangladesh and 110,000 residents in West Bengal, residing primarily in coastal areas, were evacuated further inland, and 4,000 storm shelters were readied in Bangladesh. In India, 12 National Disaster Response Force teams were deployed.

Remal affected 3.75 million people in Bangladesh and caused damage to over 150,000 houses. 1,200 electricity poles were uprooted and 20,000,000 trees were destroyed in the forests of two coastal districts. At least ten deaths occurred in the country. In India, 34 deaths occurred in Mizoram, three in Assam, one in Meghalaya, and 13 in Telangana. Heavy rainfall flooded parts of Kolkata, Silchar, and the state of Manipur. Thousands of homes in West Bengal suffered damage and low-lying areas were inundated.

== Meteorological history ==
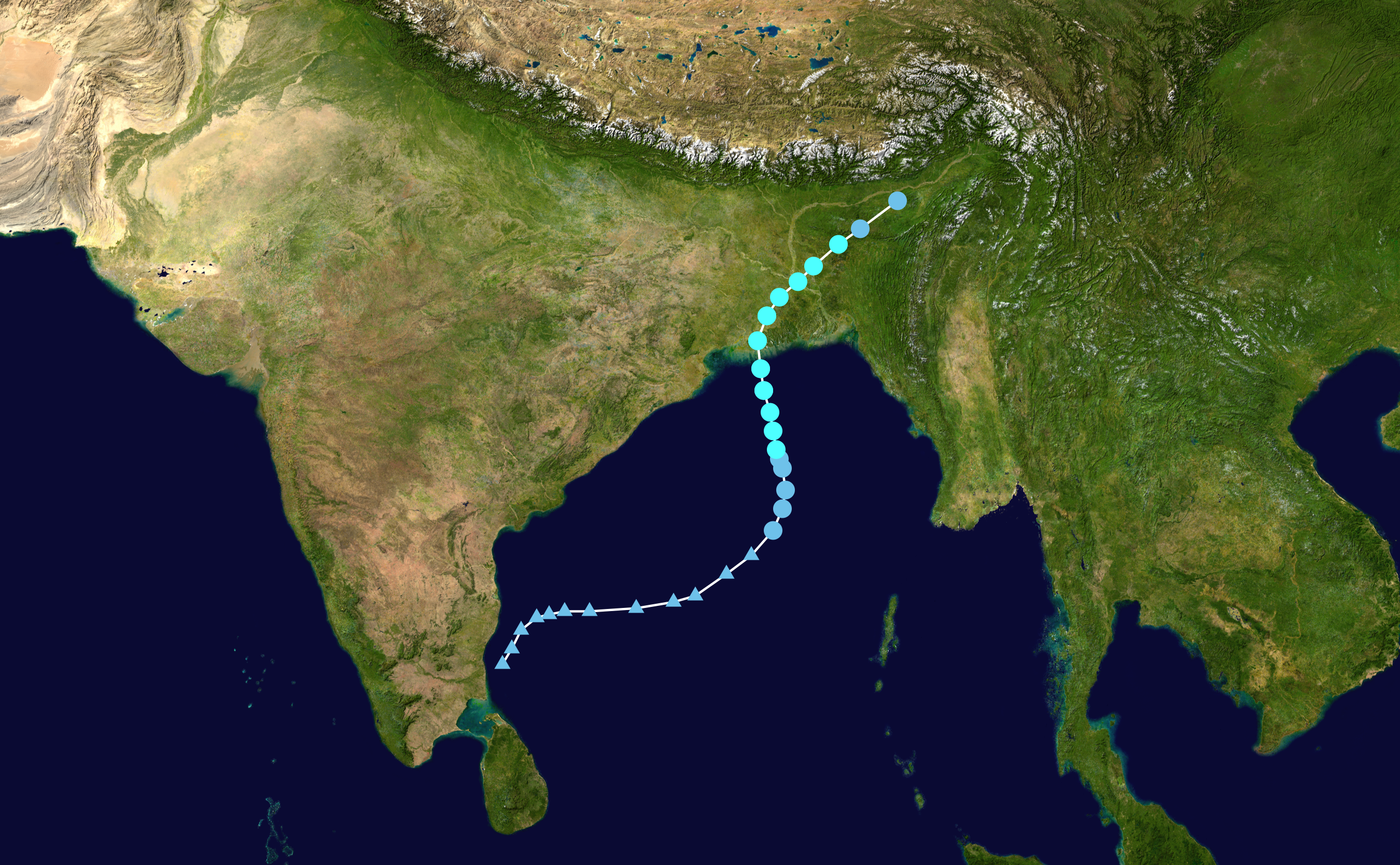
Map plotting the storm's track and intensity, according to the Saffir–Simpson scale Map key Saffir–Simpson scale Tropical depression (≤38 mph, ≤62 km/h) Tropical storm (39–73 mph, 63–118 km/h) Category 1 (74–95 mph, 119–153 km/h) Category 2 (96–110 mph, 154–177 km/h) Category 3 (111–129 mph, 178–208 km/h) Category 4 (130–156 mph, 209–251 km/h) Category 5 (≥157 mph, ≥252 km/h) Unknown Storm type Tropical cyclone Subtropical cyclone Extratropical cyclone, remnant low, tropical disturbance, or monsoon depression

On 22 May, a low-pressure area formed in the Bay of Bengal. This disturbance moved northeastwards and strengthened into a tropical depression on 24 May. The depression intensified into a deep depression and then a cyclonic storm with a minimum central pressure of 986 mbar (29.1 inHg) on 25 May, receiving the name Remal. The Joint Typhoon Warning Center (JTWC) also designated the system as tropical cyclone 01B on the same day. Remal moved north and intensified into a severe cyclonic storm early on 26 May. Continuing its intensification over the northern Bay of Bengal, Remal approached the coast of Bangladesh. The cyclone reached its peak intensity on the afternoon of 26 May with a minimum central pressure of 978 mbar (28.9 inHg) as it began making landfall on Bangladesh and was located 70 km (43 mi) south-southwest of Mongla Upazila later that day.

On 27 May, Remal continued moving northwards inland and weakened into a cyclonic storm with its center still being located over water. Later that day, the cyclone further weakened into a deep depression. Its convection became increasingly disorganized as it moved east-northeastwards, being located 30 km (19 mi) northeast of Dhaka. On the morning of 28 May, it became a depression over eastern Bangladesh, with its center not being clearly visible. The India Meteorological Department issued its final bulletin on the system as it degenerated into a low-pressure area later that day over Meghalaya.

== Preparations ==
=== Bangladesh ===
The Shah Amanat International Airport was shut down, and operations at the Port of Chittagong were suspended. The Chittagong International Airport was also closed for eight hours. 800,000 residents in the country, mainly living in coastal areas, evacuated to storm shelters further upcountry. Power was intentionally cut for almost three million citizens to avoid accidents involving power lines. 78,000 volunteers from the Cyclone Preparedness Programme were on standby to help with the cyclone. 4,000 cyclone shelters were readied, with 8,600 Bangladesh Red Crescent Society volunteers helping to bring vulnerable citizens to the shelters.

=== India ===
The IMD issued a red alert for North and South 24 Parganas district, indicating strong winds and heavy rainfall. Other districts, like the Kolkata district, were placed under an orange alert. 12 National Disaster Response Force (NDRF) teams were also deployed. A red alert was also sent out in seven districts in Assam late on 26 May. The Kolkata International Airport was shut down on 25 May, reopening on the 27th. Over 50 flights from the airport were suspended. According to local authorities, 110,000 West Bengal residents were evacuated.

== Impacts ==
=== Bangladesh ===
In Bangladesh, Remal affected 3.75 million people across 19 districts and caused damage to over 150,000 homes. Of those, 35,000 were completely destroyed. 1,200 electricity poles were also uprooted, and the lack of open stores caused food shortages. Power outages affected 20 million people and rainfall of up to 200 mm (7.9 in) was recorded during the cyclone. Storm surge caused flooding in farms and introduced seawater into drinking water. A combined total of around 20,000,000 trees and plants were destroyed in the forests of Patuakhuli and Barguna districts. Heavy rainfall caused waterlogging in Dhaka, with 116 mm (4.6 in) of rain falling in a nine-hour time period. Remal caused approximately Tk7,482 crore (US$637 million) in damages in the country and killed at least 10.

=== India ===
==== West Bengal ====
At least 356 electricity poles were uprooted, causing damage to the electrical framework. 29,500 homes suffered damage, with 2,500 of them being completely destroyed. In Kolkata, 260 mm (10 in) of rain fell in 24 hours, uprooting over 400 trees, causing power outages, and flooding streets. Homes with thatched roofs were damaged and low-lying areas were indundated across the state. Services at the Kolkata Metro were disrupted due to the inundation of Park Street and Esplanade metro stations.

==== Mizoram ====
Remal caused four landslides and the collapse of a stone quarry in Aizawl. 34 deaths occurred in the state and 54 houses in Aizawl were evacuated. Water and electricity in the state was stopped until further notice by their respective departments due to the cyclone causing damage to infrastructure. The Chief Minister of the state announced a payment of ₹400,000 (US$4,200) as ex gratia for the families of those who had died. In June 2024, Mizoram requested ₹2,376,000,000 (US$25 million) from the central government as monetary assistance following the cyclone.

==== Elsewhere ====
In Assam, three deaths occurred. In Dhekiajuli, a tree branch fell on a school bus and injured 12 students who were inside. Five other injuries also happened in the state. More than 50 per cent of Silchar and its surrounding areas were flooded. Roads were flooded across Manipur and a truck fell into a gorge in Kangpokpi district due to rainfall. In Meghalaya, one person was killed and seven others were injured by a landslide. The cyclone also caused 13 deaths in Telangana, including seven in Nagarkurnool and four in Hyderabad. Most of the deaths in the state were attributed to falling trees or collapsing structures.

== See also ==
- Weather of 2024
- Tropical cyclones in 2024
- Cyclone Mora
- Cyclone Sitrang
