= Bulbul Chowdhury (writer) =

Bangladeshi novelist and writer (1947–2021)

- Born: 14 August 1947; Dakshinbagh, Gazipur District, British Raj
- Died: 28 August 2021 (aged 74)
- Awards: Ekushey Padak (2021)

Bulbul Chowdhury (14 August 1947 – 28 August 2021) was a Bangladeshi novelist and writer. He was awarded the Ekushey Padak in 2021 in recognition of his contribution to the language and literature of Bangladesh.

== Early life ==
Chowdhury was born on 16 August 1948 in the village of Dakshinbagh, Gazipur District, East Bengal, British Raj. Besides writing, he was also involved in journalism and worked with several newspapers.

== Literary works ==
- Aparup Beel Jheel Nadi
- Kahakamini
- Tiyaser Lekhan
- Achine Anchari
- Maram Bakhani
- Ei Ghore Lakshi Thake
- Itu Boudir Ghor
- Dakhina Bao
- Gaogeramer Galpagatha
- Prachin Gitikar Golpo
- Jiboner Ankibnuki ( Autobiography)
- Atoler Kathakatha ( Autobiography)

== Awards ==
- Ekushey Padak
- Bangla Academy Literary Award
- Humayun Qadir Smriti Purashkar
- Jasimuddin Smriti Puraskar
