= Mahbubul Haque =

Bangladeshi linguist (1948–2024)

- মাহবুবুল হক
- Born: 3 November 1948; Faridpur, East Bengal, Dominion of Pakistan
- Died: 25 July 2024 (aged 75); Dhaka, Bangladesh
- Education: University of Chittagong (Ph.D.)
- Known for: Researcher
- Awards: Bangla Academy Literary Award (2018); Ekushey Padak (2019)

Mahbubul Haque (3 November 1948 – 25 July 2024) was a Bangladeshi professor, researcher and linguist. He was awarded Bangla Academy Literary Award in 2018 for his contributions in essay and Ekushey Padak in the research category in 2019.

== Life and career ==
Haque was born on 3 November 1948 at Madhukhali Upazila of Faridpur District of the then East Bengal (now Bangladesh). He graduated in Bangla Language and Literature from Chittagong University in 1969 and earned a post-graduate degree in the same subject in 1970. In 1997, he received PhD degree from the same university.

Haque died in Dhaka on 25 July 2024, at the age of 75.
