= Cyclone Sitrang =

North Indian Ocean cyclone in 2022

Cyclonic Storm Sitrang
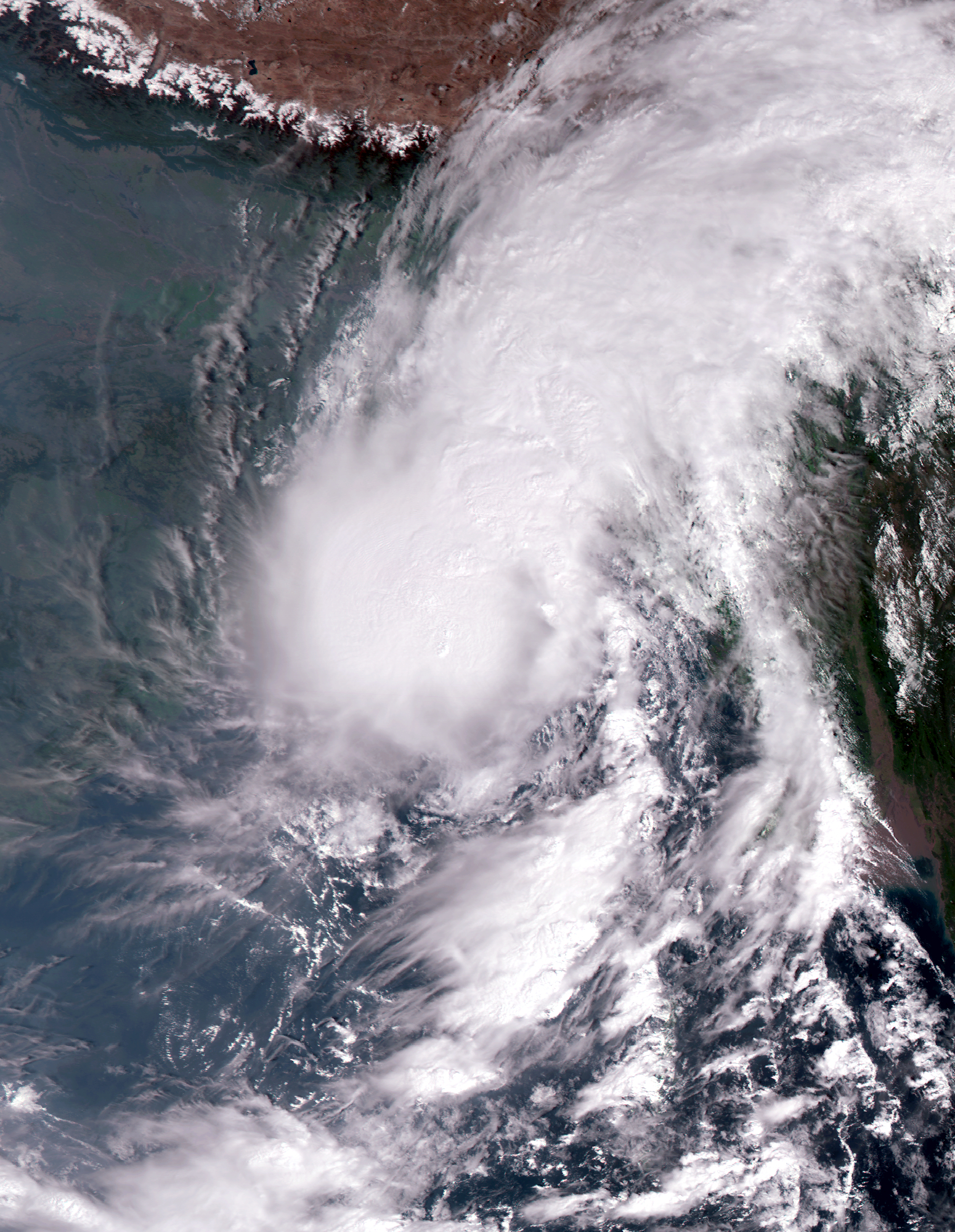
- Sitrang near peak intensity, just before landfall in Bangladesh on 24 October

Meteorological history
- Formed: 22 October 2022
- Dissipated: 25 October 2022

Cyclonic storm
- 3-minute sustained (IMD)
- Highest winds: 85 km/h (50 mph)
- Lowest pressure: 996 hPa (mbar); 29.41 inHg

Tropical storm
- 1-minute sustained (SSHWS/JTWC)
- Highest winds: 85 km/h (50 mph)
- Lowest pressure: 997 hPa (mbar); 29.44 inHg

Overall effects
- Fatalities: 35 total
- Damage: $105 million (2022 USD)
- Areas affected: Bangladesh, Northeast India
- IBTrACS /
- Part of the 2022 North Indian Ocean cyclone season

Cyclonic Storm Sitrang (Note: The name Sitrang (Thai: ศรีตรัง, [siː˩˩˦ traŋ˧]) was contributed by Thailand and refers to the blue jacaranda (Jacaranda mimosifolia) in Thai.) was the first tropical cyclone to make landfall in Bangladesh since Mora in 2017. The second named storm of the relatively quiet 2022 North Indian Ocean cyclone season, Sitrang developed from an area of convection over the northern Andaman Sea on 18 October. The system tracked northwestward and slowly gaining strength. On 22 October, it was classified as a depression while located just west of the Andaman Islands. On the next day, the system intensified to Cyclonic Storm Sitrang and curved north-northeast. Sitrang strengthened slightly and attained peak intensity on 24 October, before making landfall in Barisal Division. The cyclone weakened quickly after landfall, and degenerated to a low-pressure area over northeastern Bangladesh.

As Sitrang approached, ports of Bangladesh were put under warning signals. Ten million people were forced to evacuate in advance of the cyclone. Fisherman were urged to return from deep sea and anchored their boats. The government prepared shelters for those who lived in vulnerable regions to stay. Schools suspended classes and examinations on 24 October. Flights in Bangladesh and northeast India were cancelled due to adverse weather. Water transports were stopped for safety reason.

Sitrang brought heavy rainfall to Bangladesh and northeast India. Numerous places in Bangladesh recorded 24-hour rainfall of over 200 mm (7.9 in), though rainfall in northeast India was comparably lower. 35 people were dead after Sitrang, including eight workers from a sand mining dredger. The cyclone caused widespread damage across south-central Bangladesh, with thousands of trees were uprooted. Heavy rain from Sitrang triggered flooding which inundated croplands and fish farms, 150,000 farmers were affected. Ten million people lost power supply. Internet and digital communications were disrupted because of downed mobile towers. Over 20,000 houses were damaged by the cyclone. Highways were blocked by fallen trees and interrupted road transport. Damages across Bangladesh amounted to ৳10.7 billion (US$105 million).

== Meteorological history ==
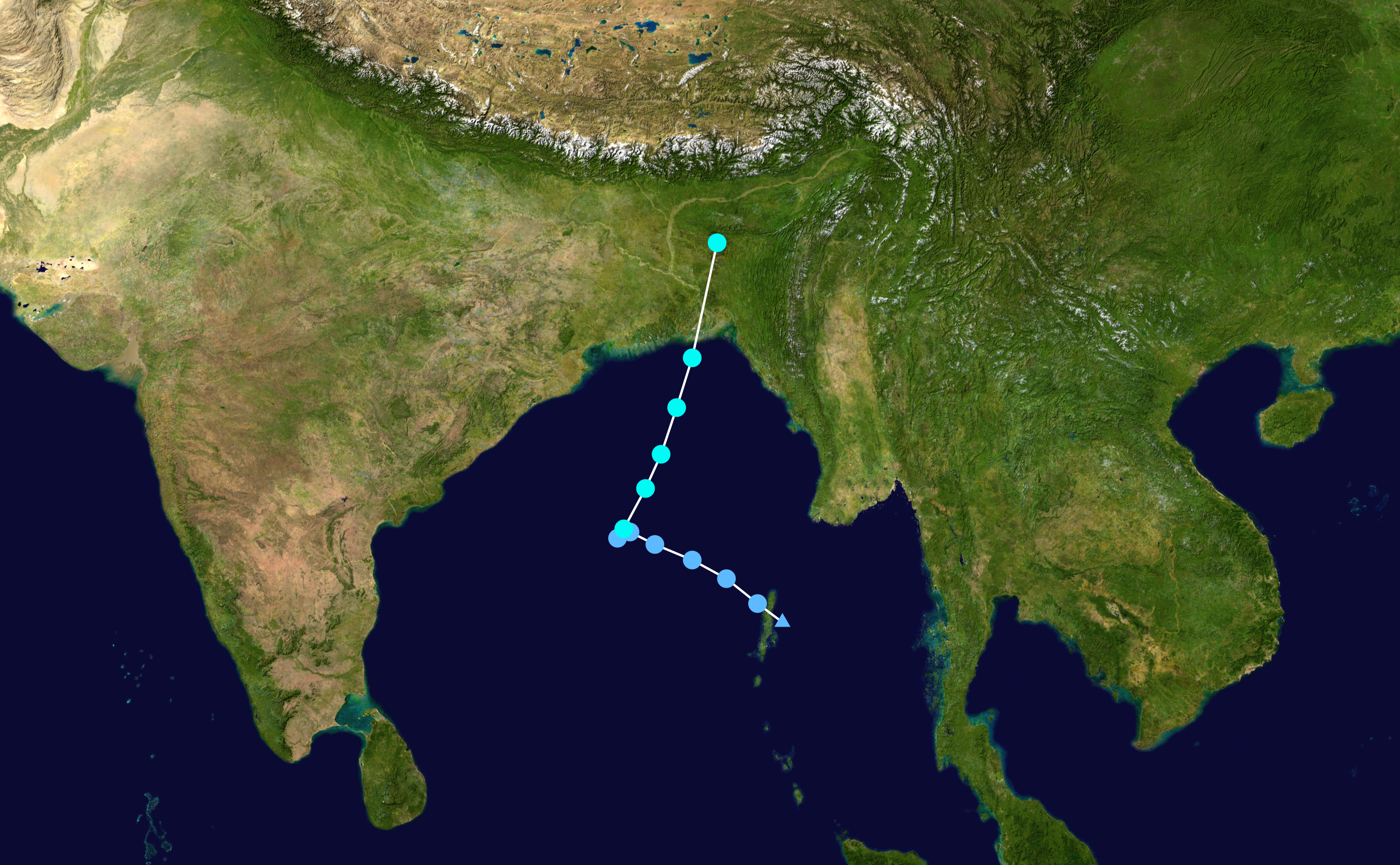
Map plotting the storm's track and intensity, according to the Saffir–Simpson scale Map key Saffir–Simpson scale Tropical depression (≤38 mph, ≤62 km/h) Tropical storm (39–73 mph, 63–118 km/h) Category 1 (74–95 mph, 119–153 km/h) Category 2 (96–110 mph, 154–177 km/h) Category 3 (111–129 mph, 178–208 km/h) Category 4 (130–156 mph, 209–251 km/h) Category 5 (≥157 mph, ≥252 km/h) Unknown Storm type Tropical cyclone Subtropical cyclone Extratropical cyclone, remnant low, tropical disturbance, or monsoon depression

Sitrang originated from an area of convection over the northern Andaman Sea on 18 October. Despite low wind shear and warm sea surface temperature of 28–30 °C (82–86 °F), the center was elongated and ill-defined. Two days later, the India Meteorological Department (IMD) noted a low-pressure area formed and began monitoring the system. Early on 22 October, the IMD classified it as a depression and assigned it as BOB 09 while located just west of the Andaman Islands. Organization of the system improved as deep convection developed over the center, which prompted the Joint Typhoon Warning Center (JTWC) to issue a Tropical Cyclone Formation Alert (TCFA) later that day. Early on 23 October, the IMD upgraded it to a deep depression, as it curved north-northeast along the western edge of a subtropical ridge. Later that day, the JTWC upgraded it to a tropical storm and assigned it as 05B, as extensive deep convection began to obscure the center, while the IMD upgraded it to a cyclonic storm and received the name Sitrang. Sitrang was a large tropical cyclone with a diameter of around 1,110 km (690 mi). It was also an asymmetrical cyclone, as the deep convection was sheared to the northeast because of increasing wind shear. Sitrang accelerated to the north-northeast along the western edge of the ridge and intensified slightly. Between 21:30 and 23:30 IST (16:00–18:00 UTC), Sitrang made landfall between Tinkona and Sandwip, near Barisal, with winds of 85 km/h (50 kmph). The cyclone began to weaken shortly after landfall, the IMD downgraded it to a deep depression at 21:00 UTC, while the JTWC issued its final warnings to Sitrang. Eaely on the next day, Sitrang weakened to a low-pressure area over the northestern Bangladesh.

== Preparations and impact ==
Emergency Response Coordination Centre map on the potential impacts of Sitrang

The Bangladesh Meteorological Department (BMD) issued a warning signal no. 4 to local ports on 23 October, which means winds of 51–61 km/h (32–38 mph) was expected to impact the ports. The signals were lowered as Sitrang made landfall and weakened. At least ten million people were evacuated to safety places in advance of the cyclone. Fisherman were asked to return from deep sea and anchored their boats in the Bay of Bengal. The government prepared 7,490 shelters for the regions prone to Sitrang. 219,690 people were sheltered there. The University of Liberal Arts Bangladesh suspended the class and examinations on 24 October due to Sitrang. Primary schools in Chittagong, Khulna, and Barisal Divisions were closed on that day. 60 flights from Biman Bangladesh, US-Bangla, and Novoair were cancelled due to adverse weather. Inland water transports were stopped due to safety concern. The Airports Authority of India (AAI) cancelled ten flights in northeast India. Train services were also interrupted in the region, leaving many people stranded.

Sitrang brought heavy rainfall to Bangladesh. 24-hour rainfall peaked at 324 mm (12.8 in) in Barisal. Madaripur recorded 24-hour rainfall of 315 mm (12.4 in). Places like Dhaka, Tangail, Kalapara Upazila, Bagerhat, Patuakhali, Bhola District, Khulna, and Faridpur District recorded 24-hour rainfall of over 200 mm (7.9 in). Rainfall in northeast India was relatively lower, about 50–80 mm (2.0–3.1 in) in Arunachal Pradesh and nearby areas. Sitrang killed 35 people. Eight workers died due to the sinking of a sand mining dredger off the coast of Mirsarai, while majority of the remaining fatalities were due to drowning and tree falling. Boats carrying 20 fishermen capsized off the Sagar Island, and they were rescued by Indian Coast Guard. Sitrang caused widespread damage across south-central Bangladesh. Thousands of trees were uprooted by strong winds. Heavy rainfall from Sitrang triggered flooding which inundated 33,000 ha (82,000 acres) of Aman paddy crop and fish farms. 150,000 farmers were affected by the cyclone, and incurred a loss of ৳3.5 billion (US$34.4 million). In Char Fasson Upazila, floodwaters of 3–5 ft (0.91–1.52 m) trapped 10,000 people, in which 2,000 of them were moved to shelters. Ten million people experienced power outages. The electricity sector reported a damage of ৳2.2 billion (US$21.6 million). 7,343 mobile towers were downed, which disrupted Internet and digital communications. Over 20,000 houses were damages by the cyclone. Dhaka-Khulna and Dhaka-Barishal highways were blocked by fallen trees, but re-opened ten hours later. A local wholesale market suffered a loss of ৳5 billion (US$49.2 million).

== Aftermath ==
The government of Bangladesh distributed ৳25,000 (US$245) for families of the dead. A family received an additional aid of ৳6,000 (US$59) for rehabilitation and tin sheets. The government of Patuakhali District prepared 25 t (55,000 lb) of rice with an aid of ৳750,000 (US$7,400), while the government of Cox's Bazar District prepared 323 t (712,000 lb) of rice, an aid valued at ৳800,000 (US$7,900), 1,198 packages of dried food, 350 cartons of pre-packaged cakes, and 400 cartons of digestive biscuits for those who were affected by Sitrang. Meta provided ৳15 million (US$148,000) to Bangladesh Red Crescent Society and BRAC to assist rehabilitation efforts for the areas impacted by Sitrang. However, some victims had not received any assistance besides the initial relief of dry food which distributed shortly after the cyclone.

== See also ==
- Weather of 2022
- Tropical cyclones in 2022
- 2022 North Indian Ocean cyclone season
- Cyclone Viyaru
- Cyclone Amphan, an extremely powerful tropical cyclone that affected Bangladesh in 2020
- Cyclone Sidr
- Cyclone Midhili
- Cyclone Remal
