= Sayeeda Khanam =

Bangladeshi photographer (1937–2020)

- সাইদা খানম
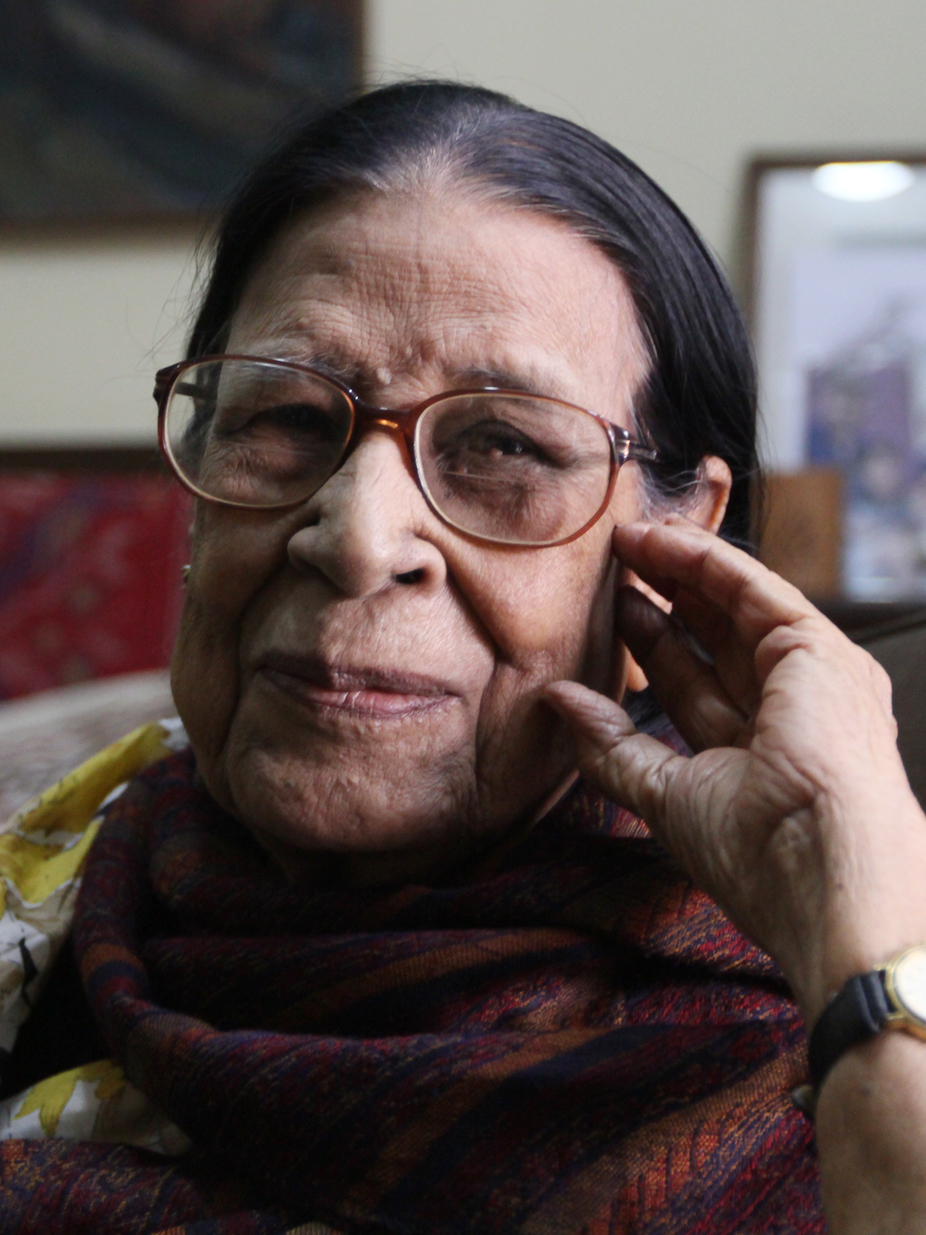
- Khanom in 2015
- Born: 29 December 1937; Pabna, Bengal Presidency, British India
- Died: 18 August 2020 (aged 82); Dhaka, Bangladesh
- Education: University of Dhaka
- Occupation: Photographer
- Awards: Ekushey Padak

Sayeeda Khanam (29 December 1937 – 18 August 2020) was the first female professional photographer of Bangladesh. She covered many important events of Liberation War of Bangladesh in 1971 through her photography.

== Early life and education ==
Khanam was born in Pabna District in the then Bengal Presidency (now Bangladesh). She was the youngest among her two brothers and four sisters. Her interest in photography began at a very early age when her sister bought her a Rolleicord camera. She never received any institutional training on photography, but learned from foreign photography magazines which were given to her by the owner of Jaidi's studio, a studio of Dhaka.

Khanam completed her master's degree in Bengali literature and library science from the University of Dhaka.

== Career ==
In 1956, she began her career as a photographer in Begum, the only newspaper dedicated to women at that time. Her photographs have been published in several national newspapers and she covered many national and international seminars. She worked as a photographer with the filmmaker Satyajit Ray in three of his films. Besides Ray, she also did portraits of figures such as Queen Elizabeth, Neil Armstrong, Buzz Aldrin, Mother Teresa, Indira Gandhi and Sheikh Mujibur Rahman.

Khanam worked as a librarian in seminar library of Bengali Literature department of University of Dhaka from 1974 to 1986. After the war, she volunteered as a nurse in Holy Family Hospital for a while.

== Exhibitions and awards ==
Khanam had her first international exhibition in 1956 after participating in the International Photo and Cinema Exhibition, Cologne. In the same year, her works were displayed in the International Photography held in Dhaka and later exhibited in international competitions in Japan, France, Sweden, Pakistan and Cyprus. Her works on Mother Teresa, Rabindra Sangeet singer Konika Bandopadhaya and Satyajit Ray were also exhibited in Dhaka.

In 1960, she received an award in All Pakistan Photo Contest and in 1985 she was honored with UNESCO Award for photography. She received many other awards from several national and international organizations. She is a lifetime member of Bangladesh Mahila Samiti and Bangla Academy.
