= 2022 Eden College Scandal =

The Eden Mohila College scandal is a series of events in 2022 that revealed the decade-long criminal activities including extortion, seat business, forced prostitution, led by the leaders of Bangladesh Chhatra League. The allegations of carrying out unethical activities on the campus came to light when a section of Chhatra League in the college became vocal against the leadership of the student organisation.

== Background ==
After Awami League came to power in Bangladesh under the ⁣⁣Second Hasina ministry, it's student wing Bangladesh Chhatra League routed away all the opposition party supported student groups from the educational institutes and established their supremacy inside the campus. As time passed, Chhatra League leaders and activists started terrorizing almost all the university and college campuses of the country by triggering violence. They started making headlines for murdering fellow students, extortion, rape, sexual harassment of female fellows, and so on.

Like every other campus in the country, Chhatra League captured the Eden Mohila College as well and the leadership of Chhatra League have been installing the leaders of their choice to serve their purpose. In 2010, Eden Mohila College became a center of discussion in the nation for admission trade when a group of Chhatra League supporter female students accused another group of Chhatra League for admission test fraud in lieu of money. The central Chhatra League leadership responded by expelling the leaders who blew the whistle, instead of the accused ones. It was alleged that the then Chhatra League president Mahmud Hasan Ripon used to receive the share of money collected from admission trade.

Clouds of controversy started hanging over the Eden College when Chhatra League leaders Al Nahean Khan Joy and Lekhak Bhattacharjee declared the formation of a new committee in May 2022. Allegations of being married and over-aged were brought against the new leaders, though the Chhatra League leadership did not take any action to probe the allegations.

== Key allegations ==
In August 2022, an audio clip of Bangladesh Chhatra League's Eden Mohila College unit president Tamanna Jasmin Riva was circulated on local media where she was found threatening the students of strangling to death and chopping their bodies into pieces.

She was found saying,

You are doing excess. I will catch one of you and then split another one. You are legal students, so... What is the source of your power? Whether you will stay in my political room legally is up to you. You have been allotted seat legally and that does not matter. If I do not give you a seat, which of your fathers will give it to you from room no. 202. Will madams give it? Do they have that power?

Riva later admitted of the incident and offered apology. However, in the last week of the month, she tortured students for leaking the audio clip and threatened them of stripping naked and videotape that to circulate them on social media. This sparked tension between the students at the college and in September the vice-president of Eden College unit of Bangladesh Chhatra League Jannatul Ferdowsi spoke to media about a series of allegations against the President and Secretary General of the Eden College Chhatra League unit. After that, she was taken hostage by the supporters of the duo and beaten in a room inside the college for speaking up. Later, students at the college held a press conference and made serious allegations against the leaders of Chhatra League.

=== Sexual exploitation of students ===
The Eden College unit of Chhatra League is accused of forcing students to have sex with influential people, including senior Chhatra League leaders, by blackmailing them with compromising pictures of them taken under pressure. Samia Akter Boishakhi, the organizing secretary of Eden College Chhatra League told, "When the legal students of the dormitory sign the registration sheet, followers of the Chhatra League president click photographs of them. Afterwards, they select the 'pretty' ones and take them to their rooms to threaten them to do illicit activities. They want to do 'business' using these helpless girls."

To force the students to do what they want, the Chhatra League leadership capture 'objectionable' videos of the girls and threaten to make them public. Nusrat Keya, an honors student of Eden College, said, "They capture objectionable videos of the students and threaten to make these videos public if they don't leave their seats

Leading women's rights activists demanded an impartial inquiry into allegations of forced sex and sought exemplary punishment for anyone involved in such crime.

=== Seat trade ===
Chhatra League leaders are accused of charging students ৳8,000 to ৳12,000 for the 'allocation' of a place in a dormitory, and an additional ৳2,000 each month to keep that place.

=== Extortion ===
The Chhatra League leadership is accused of running extortion rings and collect money from almost every service available at Eden College, from halls and canteens to internet service providers.

=== Torture ===
Dissenting students, students who do not join political programs and the residents of the dormitories who fail to pay the monthly 'protection money' are subjected to torture according to the students of the college. In an audio clip that was circulated on the media in August the president of Chhatra League was found threatening students to tear into two pieces and torturing them for not listening to her directives. In late August, two students were confined and tortured for six hours.

== Administrative ineffectiveness ==
The administration of the college was found largely ineffective before and after the allegations were formally raised and circulated in the media. As of September 2022, the college authority did not initiate any investigation into the alleged crimes.

Bangladesh has a problem of appointing politically loyal teachers in the key positions of educational institutes. An investigation by The Daily Star found more than 80% of the vice-chancellors of public universities held positions in pro-Awami League teachers' panel. The others are extremely loyal to the ruling party as well.

== Reaction ==
Leading women leaders of the country and organizations criticized Bangladesh Chhatra League leadership and the government for their inaction. They asked for exemplary punishment of the ones involved in these heinous acts. Naripokkho, a leading women-rights organization stated, "There is an allegation that the college authorities did not act against accused leaders, instead send the victims to their homes" and "the ruling party's student wing has been carrying out such repression for years".

Writer and anthropologist Rahnuma Ahmed found the allegations about forcing fellow students to sexually submit to male party leaders and high-ups horrifying and said, "I think the college administration should also be investigated."
