= Toufique Imrose Khalidi =

Bangladeshi journalist (1967–2026)

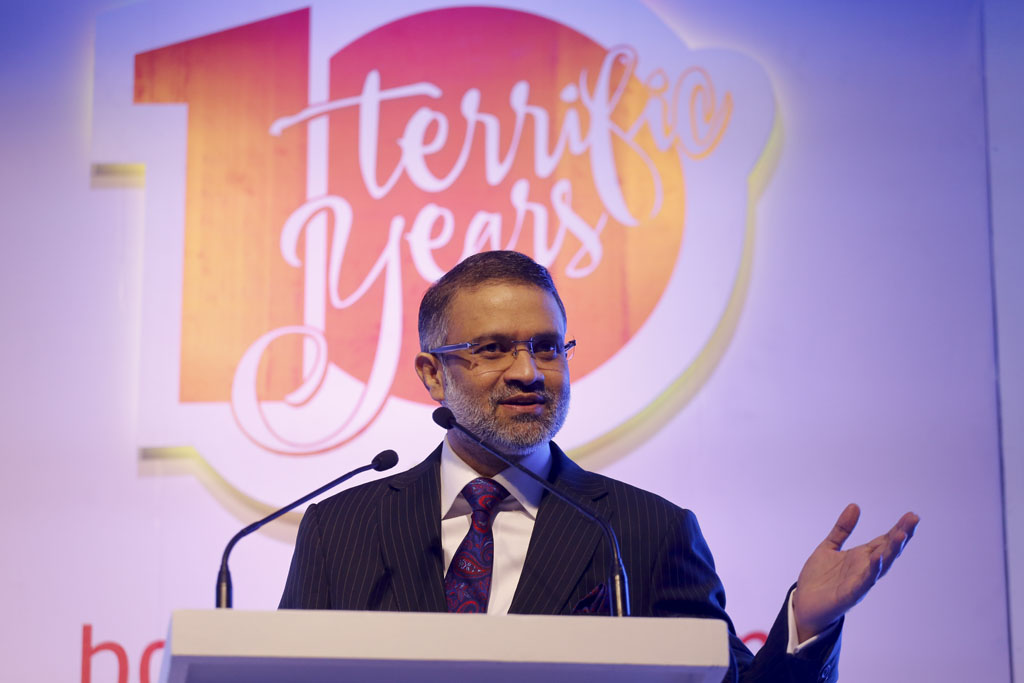
Khalidi in 2016

Toufique Imrose Khalidi (Bengali: তৌফিক ইমরোজ খালিদী; 14 June 1967 – 2 October 2026) was a Bangladeshi journalist, editor, media businessman, and the owner and editor-in-chief of bdnews24.com.

== Early life and education ==
Toufique Imrose Khalidi was born in Dhaka, East Pakistan on 14 June 1967. He earned both a B.A. (Hons) and an M.A. in English literature from the University of Dhaka. Khalidi served as the general secretary of the university's English Literature Alumni Association for several years.

== Career ==
Khalidi was news editor of The Daily Star in Bangladesh, and worked with the BBC World Service in London. He left the latter to return to Bangladesh and launch bdnews24.com in 2006. The outlet has focused on stories affecting underrepresented groups, with initiatives like the Prism project, helping young journalists to report stories from their communities.

He contributed articles to international news outlets. Under Khalidi's leadership, bdnews24.com became the first publication in Asia to partner with The New York Times to jointly edit and publish its annual Turning Points magazine in Bangladesh. In 2018, Khalidi served as a panellist at the "Bangladesh Rising" conference at Harvard University, where he discussed the role of media in Bangladesh's economic and social development.

== Legal issues ==
In 2020, legal authorities began investigating allegations of financial misconduct and graft against Khalidi. The case drew significant media attention, with supporters claiming the charges were politically motivated, aimed at stifling independent journalism in Bangladesh. On 5 September 2024, the court dismissed the case and acquitted Khalidi of all charges. Khalidi's treatment by the authorities drew broad criticism across Bangladeshi and international media, due to the unsubstantiated nature of the investigations.

== Death ==
Khalidi died in London on 2 October 2026, at the age of 59, after suffering a brain haemorrhage.
