= Kazi Misbahun Nahar =

Bangladeshi doctor and actress

- কাজী মিসবাহুন নাহার
- Other name: Kazi Misbahun Nahar Tamanna
- Citizenship: Bangladesh
- Occupations: Actress, doctor
- Awards: Independence Day Award (2019)

Kazi Misbahun Nahar is a doctor and actress from Bangladesh. In Natangan, especially in theatre in Bangladesh, she is also known as Kazi Tamanna. She was awarded the Independence Day Award in 2019 for her unique contribution to the Bangladesh Liberation War.

== Early life ==
Nahar's father, Kazi Mohammad Idris, was a journalist and her mother, Kazi Aziza Idris, was a social worker.

== Career ==
Nahar is doctor, who provided medical services to Mukti Bahini during the Bangladesh Liberation War.

Nahar is associated with Natyadal Theater, played the role of Nandini in Rabindranath Tagore's play 'Raktakarbi', which was staged for the first time on the premises of Bangla Academy during the 1969 Mass uprising.

She was awarded the Independence Day Award, the highest civilian honour, in 2019 for her contribution to Bangladesh's independence movement and Bangladesh Liberation War.
