= Bdnews24.com =

English-Bengali language news portal

bdnews24.com
- Type: Online newspaper
- Format: Mobile app; Webpage
- Owner: Bangladesh News 24 Hours Ltd.
- Founder(s): Ahmed Yasir Riad, Toufique Imrose Khalidi
- Editor-in-chief: Vacant
- Founded: 2005; 21 years ago
- Language: English; Bengali
- Headquarters: Dhaka, Bangladesh
- City: Dhaka
- Country: Bangladesh
- Website: bdnews24.com

bdnews24.com is an English and Bengali language online news portal based in Bangladesh. After being founded in 2005 as a news agency website by Ahmed Yasir Riad, it was taken over in 2006 with ownership being split between Toufique Imrose Khalidi and Asif Mehmood.

The website has become inaccessible numerous times following website blocking incidents.

== History ==
In 2005, the company launched initially as the country's first exclusively web-based news agency, and was known as BDNEWS. The website bdnews24.com developed by Ahmed Yasir Riad (2005–2013) was Bangladesh's first 24/7 bilingual news web portal. The other two national news agencies at the time were the state-owned Bangladesh Sangbad Sangstha (BSS) and the privately owned United News of Bangladesh (UNB), which at the time were teleprinter-based "wire services". Following a take-over in mid-2006 at the agency's holding company Bangladesh News 24 Hours Ltd, ownership is vested between two sole board directors: Managing Director and Editor-in-Chief Toufique Imrose Khalidi, and chair of the company Asif Mahmood.

In October 2006, bdnews24.com relaunched as Bangladesh's first free online newspaper developed by Yasir, and was rebranded as bdnews24.com. Editor-in-Chief Khalidi was a journalist and former BBC broadcaster. On 28 May 2012, the office of bdnews24.com was attacked by men with machetes injuring three journalists.

== News categories ==
The website regularly publishes news on topics such as Bangladesh, trade, politics, economy, world, science, environment, health, technology, children, entertainment, sports, and 'Hello' (for young journalists), among others. Its chief reporter is Jahidul Kabir.

== Website blocks ==
=== 2018 ===
In June 2018, Bdnews24.com was blocked without explanation by the Bangladesh Telecommunication Regulatory Commission (BTRC). After several hours, the BTRC unblocked the website. According to the chairman of the BTRC, the site had "added some objectionable comments in one of their news items". The item was not identified by the BTRC, but other sources reported that, it was about General Aziz Ahmed's appointment as army chief of staff.

=== 2023 ===
BDNews24 shut down on 1 September 2023. About this shutdown, BDNews authorities said: "For reasons beyond our control, it is not possible to provide regular services to readers on our news portal. We sincerely apologize. We assure readers, our fight to bring the website back is on. For now, keep an eye on our Facebook, Instagram, X Page and YouTube channel for updates."

Bangladeshi-American political scientist Ali Riaz responded, "BDNews24 published an analysis by Chandan Nandy on India's influence on Bangladeshi politics. The article has since been published on an Indian website and claims that the BDNews24 website has been 'blocked' in India and Bangladesh." As of 7 September 2023, the site showed a maintenance message. The following month the site was operational again.
