= Ahmed Iqbal Haider =

- আহমেদ ইকবাল হায়দার
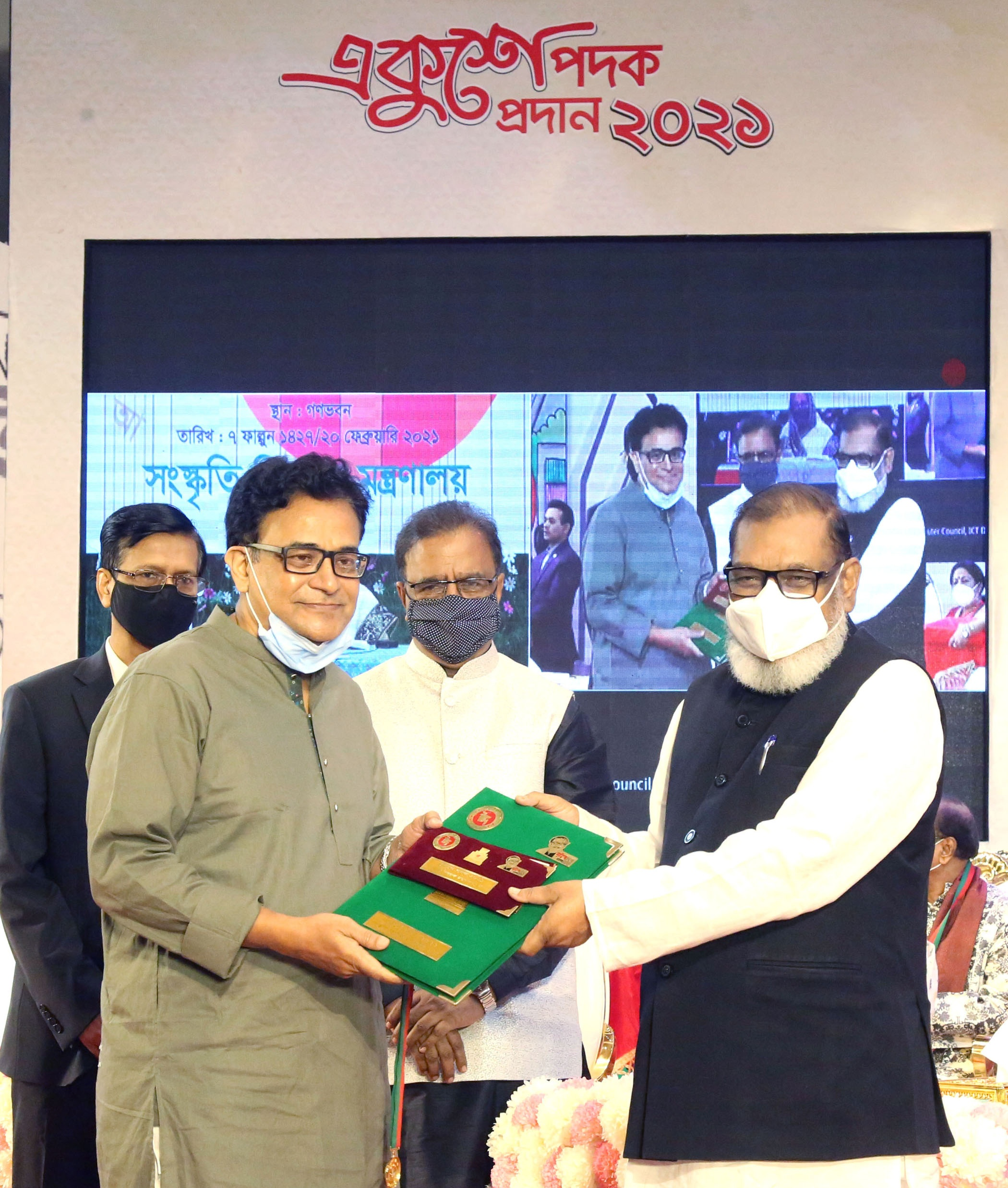
- Haider receives Ekushey Padak 2021.
- Born: Patiya Upazila, Chittagong, Bangladesh
- Occupation: Theatre director
- Awards: Ekushey Padak (2021)

Ahmed Iqbal Haider is a Bangladeshi theatre director. As of 2012, he directed a total 56 plays . He serves as the Artistic Director of Theatre Institute Chittagong (TIC). In 2021, he was awarded Ekushey Padak from the Government of Bangladesh for his contribution to drama.

== Career ==
Haider debuted in theatre in 1975. He is the team leader of Tirjak Natyadal, a theatre troupe based in Chittagong, Bangladesh.

Haider is the organising secretary of International Theater Institute Bangladesh Chapter and participated as a Bangladeshi representative in 31st, 32nd and 33rd ITI World Congress.

== Works ==
- Bishorjon (by Rabindranath Tagore)
- Rathjatra (by Rabindranath Tagore)
- Raktokarobi (by Rabindranath Tagore)
- Raja (by Rabindranath Tagore)
- Dakghar (by Rabindranath Tagore)
- Merchant of Venice (by William Shakespeare)
- Oedipus (by Sophocles)
- Madhumala (by Kazi Nazrul Islam)
- Buro Shalikher Gharey Rown (by Michael Madhusudan Dutta)
- Dwarruddha (by Jean Paul Sartre)
- Atotayi (by Selim Al Deen)
- Smriti: '71 (by Zia Haider)
- Tarangobhango (by Syed Waliullah)
- Swat (by Mamunur Rashid)
