= Faizul Islam (writer) =

Bangladeshi writer and economist (1963–2025)

Faizul Islam (24 November 1963 – 21 January 2025) was a Bangladeshi economist and fiction writer.

== Background ==
Faizul Islam was born in Siddheshwari, Dhaka on 24 November 1963. He completed his secondary and higher secondary education at Pabna Zilla School and Pabna Edward College. He pursued undergraduate and postgraduate studies in economics at Rajshahi University. Additionally, he attended Williams College and the University of Siena for further studies.

Islam died at a hospital in Dhaka on 21 January 2025, at the age of 61.

== Career ==
=== Writing ===
From 1990, his works of fiction have appeared in numerous literary magazines across the country. He published several story collections, including Nakkhatrer Ghora, Khowaj Khijirer Shindhuk, Ayna, Nilkhete Keno Jai, Ghumtrishna, Jamin, and Bakhtiar Khaner Cycle. In addition, he penned the novel Boy’s School Band. His story collection, Khowaj Khijirer Shindhuk, was recognized as the best work in the fiction category by the national daily Prothom Alo.

=== Government official ===
Islam worked in private, government and international organizations for a long time. He was a visiting research fellow in the Department of Economics at the University of Sussex.

He was serving as the chairman of the Bangladesh Trade and Tariff Commission until his death.
