= Nurunnahar Fatema Begum =

Bangladeshi army officer and paediatric cardiologist

- নুরুন্নাহার ফাতেমা বেগম
- Born: 19 September 1962 (age 64); Moulvibazar, East Pakistan, Pakistan
- Spouse: Col. (retd) Azhar Uddin Ahmed
- Military career
- Allegiance: Bangladesh
- Branch: Bangladesh Army
- Service years: 1987-2022
- Rank: Brigadier General
- Unit: Army Medical Corps
- Commands: Head (Paediatric Cardiology) of CMH, Dhaka; Head (Paediatric Cardiology) of Armed Forces Medical College
- Awards: Senabahini Padak (SBP); Independence Day Award

Brigadier General Nurunnahar Fatema Begum (born 19 September 1962) is the first-ever pediatric cardiologist of Bangladesh and a brigadier general of the Bangladesh Army. In 2019, she was awarded both the Independence Day Award (highest state award) and the Shena Bahini Podok (peacetime award of the Bangladesh Army) for her irreplaceable contribution to the field of pediatric medicine. She single-handedly established the concept of congenital cardiac intervention in Bangladesh.

== Early life ==
Begum was born on 19 September 1962 in Moulvibazar, East Pakistan. She is the daughter of customs official MA Wadud and housewife Moimunnessa Khatun. She has three brothers and three sisters.

Begum passed her SSC in 1977 from Kishori Mohan Girls School and HSC from Murari Chand College in 1979. She graduated from Sylhet MAG Osmani Medical College in 1985, where she placed second in her entire district.

== Career ==
Begum joined the Army Medical Corps of the Bangladesh Army as an MO in 1987. She obtained her FCPS degree in the field of pediatrics in 1995 under BCPS.

In 1996 she joined and was promoted to senior registrar in the Prince Sultan Cardiac Centre in Riyadh, KSA.

Following her return in 1998, she was appointed as chief pediatric cardiologist in CMH, Dhaka, a department that she herself established. She realised at an early age the importance of serving the people of her country, and she dedicates each day of her life to working towards that singular goal.

Begum is currently appointed as an interventional pediatric cardiologist and the head of pediatric cardiology at the Combined Military Hospital, Dhaka. She also serves as the professor of pediatrics in the Armed Forces Medical College and is the head of pediatrics in Kurmitola General Hospital. She also practices at the Dhanmondi branch of Labaid Specialized Hospital.

== Accomplishments ==
Begum made the diagnoses of congenital heart diseases less tedious. Her department is the first and only pediatric cardiology unit in Bangladesh capable of dealing with pediatric cardiac emergencies and interventions. To date, Begum has performed over 7000 such interventions.

Her NNF protocol for PPHN and Cyanotic spell is used worldwide, and has saved many lives.

On 25 March 2019, Begum was awarded the highest state award in recognition of her contributions to this country and its people by Prime Minister Sheikh Hasina. The same year, she was honored with the highest peacetime award of the Bangladesh Army.

She was awarded the FRCP from the Royal College of Physicians in Edinburgh and the FACC from the American College of Cardiology in 2009. In 2011, she was also awarded the FSCAI from the Society of Cardiovascular Angiography and Intervention. She received a lifetime achievement award from the Bangladesh Echocardiography Society. She was the country representative in the "Asia Pacific Society of Cardiology and Cardiac Surgery" held in 2006.

She is the founding chairperson and current VP of the Scientific Committee of Pediatric Cardiac Society of Bangladesh (PCSB). She is also a lifetime member of the Bangladesh Cardiac Society, Bangladesh Pediatric Association, Bangladesh Heart Research Association, Bangladesh Perinatal Society, and the Bangladesh Neonatal Society.

== Publications ==
She has over 100 publications in medical and scientific journals.

Her published works include Congenital Cardiac Interventions and Research work in Bangladesh, Notes on basic Paediatric Cardiology, Manual of Basic and Advanced life support, Care of newborn and pregnant mother, etc.

== Philanthropy ==
Begum has collaborated with many charitable organisations which include Little hearts, Muntada Aid and Qatar Red Crescent Charity, to help the women and children of Bangladesh.

She is the founder and general secretary of the Wadud-Moimunnessa Charitable foundation. The foundation partakes in the weekly free Friday clinic in Begum's paternal village of Borlekha, Moulvibazar which is overseen by her eldest brother A.K.M. Faruque.

As a sign of encouragement the WM foundation awards gold medals and honorariums to up-and-coming pediatricians. The foundation has also set up the Wadud-Moimunnessa community clinic in 2020, which offers maximum healthcare for minimum pay.

She is always looking for ways to help her country and its people. She believes in giving back to the community that has helped nurture her and her family.

== Personal life ==
Begum currently resides in Dhaka Cantonment with her husband Colonel (retd.) Azhar Uddin Ahmed. They have two daughters and one grandson.
