= Kazi Kamruzzaman =

Bangladeshi social worker, and surgeon

Kazi Kamruzzaman is a Bangladeshi social worker and chairman of Dhaka Community Hospital Trust. He was awarded the Ekushey Padak in 2021.

== Career ==
Kamruzzaman is a pediatric surgeon and the president of Society of Pediatrics Surgery. He is also a veteran of the Bangladesh Liberation War. He founded the Dhaka Community Hospital Trust with 20 beds in 1988 and is the chairperson of the Dhaka Community Hospital Trust, which owns Dhaka Community Hospital and the Dhaka Community Medical College.
