= M. Amjad Hossain =

Bangladeshi surgeon and fighter (born 1953)

- আমজাদ হোসেন
- Born: 1953 (age 72–73); Sukdebpur, Dinajpur District, East Bengal, Dominion of Pakistan
- Education: Dhaka Medical College (MBBS); National Institute of Traumatology and Orthopedic Rehabilitation (MS)
- Occupation: Orthopedic surgeon
- Awards: Independence Day Award 2021

M. Amjad Hossain (born 1953) is an orthopedic surgeon and a fighter during the Bangladesh Liberation War. He was awarded the Independence Award (Swadhinata Padak) in 2021. He is known nationally and internationally for his works. Professor Dr. M. Amjad Hossain is a leading orthopedic surgeon in Bangladesh, specializing in orthopedics and trauma.

== Participation in Liberation war ==
Hossain took part in the Bangladesh Liberation War in 1971. During the war, he sustained an injury on his femur and underwent treatment at Indian military hospitals.

== Education and career ==
Hossain earned his MBBS (Bachelor of Medicine, Bachelor of Surgery) degree and went on to pursue his MS (Master of Surgery) in Orthopaedics. He further enhanced his expertise by becoming an AO Fellow in Germany, indicating advanced training in trauma surgery from the Association for the Study of Internal Fixation.

Hossain served as Professor and Head of the Department of Orthopedic Surgery at Dhaka Medical College, Dhaka. Currently, he holds the position of Chief Consultant and Head of the Department of Orthopedic Surgery at Labaid Specialized Hospital in Dhanmondi, Dhaka.

Hossain is recognized for his contributions to total hip and knee arthroplasty, helping patients with severe joint pain regain mobility and independence.
