= Pranab Kumar Barua =

Bangladeshi academic (1934–2024)

- প্রণব কুমার বড়ুয়া
- Born: 23 August 1934; Chittagong, Bengal Presidency, British India
- Died: 28 April 2024 (aged 89); Chattogram, Bangladesh
- Education: Kolkata University
- Occupation: Academic
- Awards: Ekushey Padak (2019)

Pranab Kumar Barua (23 August 1934 – 28 April 2024) was a Bangladeshi academic. He was awarded Ekushey Padak by the government of Bangladesh in 2019 for his contributions in the field of education. He served as one of the Advisers of Bangladesh Awami League.

== Early life ==
Barua was born on 23 August 1934 in Aburkhil village under Raozan Upazila in Chattogram District of the then British India (now Bangladesh). He received a Master's degree in Bengali literature and Pali. He received his professional B.Ed. degree with first class and earned PhD from Kolkata University. He also had degree in religious education such as Sutra.

== Career ==
Barua was a teacher for 35 years and was a visiting professor of Pali Department of Dhaka University. He served as the Principal of Kanungoopara College, Rangunia College, Agrashar Girls' College and Kundeshwari College. He was devoted to spreading education, especially women's education across the country and founded many educational institutions.

== Death ==
Barua died in Chattogram on 28 April 2024, at the age of 89.

== Books ==
Barua books include:

- Bengali Buddhist contribution to the liberation war
- Buddhist religion and culture of Bangladesh
- Atish Dipankar
- Buddhist Code of Conduct
- How did I see mahā thero
- The life and the words of Gautam Buddha

== Awards and recognition ==
- Raj Gaurab award by Thai king
- Mahatma Gandhi National Award
- Mother Teresa Award
- Ekushey Padak (2019)
