= Jumu'atul-Wida =

Last Friday in the month of Ramadan before Eid al-Fitr

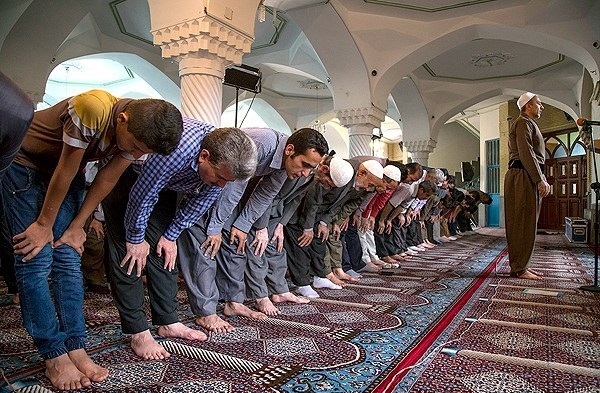
- Jameh Mosque of Sanandaj during Ramadan
- Official name: Jumu'atul-Wida
- Observed by: Muslims
- Begins: Last Friday of Ramadan
- Date: last Friday in the month of Ramadan before Eid al-Fitr
- Frequency: annual

Jumu'atul-Wida (Arabic: جمعة الوداع meaning Friday of farewell, also called al-Jumu'ah al-Yateemah Arabic: الجمعة اليتيمة or the orphaned Friday Urdu: الوداع جمعہ Al-Widaa Juma) is the last Friday in the month of Ramadan before Eid al-Fitr. This is a holy day for Muslims.

Muslims ask for Allah's forgiveness and they give to the poor on this day. They offer prayers and they believe that prayers made on this day will be answered. Muslims believe giving to the poor (zakat) on Ramadan will bring them wealth and blessings during the year and in the future. The Jumu'atul-Wida is a chance for Muslims to say goodbye to Ramadan as Eid al-Fitr approaches.

== Background ==
Jumu'atul-Wida is the last Friday prayer or Jumu’ah; Wida means end referring to the end of Ramadan. Another name for the holiday is Alvida Jumma meaning Friday of farewell.

The name of the day means a farewell to Ramadan. In Islam, Friday is the Sabbath and the holiest day of the week; consequently the last Friday of Ramadan is important because it gives Muslims a chance to reflect on Ramadan. Jumu'atul-Wida is considered one of the five holiest days for Muslims and is the holiest sabbath in Islam.

== History ==
Sincerity, 112th chapter of the Quran recited by Mishari Alafasy

In observation of the day, Muslims attend Friday Jumu’ah prayers and they go to a mosque to pray. Worshippers also ask for forgiveness from Allah. The Jumu'atul-Wida is important because it is the last Friday Jumu’ah in the month of Ramadan and the hadith teaches that heaven is opened and hell is closed during Ramadan. The term is not found in the Qur'an or Hadith. Worshippers observe the day by washing their body and wearing new clothing. During the day they recite passages from the Quran. Another feature of the day is that Muslims in cities tend to pray together in one large mosque.

Muslims believe that prayers made on this the last Friday of Ramadan will be answered. Muslims also believe giving to the poor (zakat) on this day will bring them wealth and blessings in the year and in the future. They also believe that all of their sins will be forgiven by praying and reciting the Quran on this day. Jumu'atul-Wida does not have a dedicated prayer or "Ibadah".

Followers of Islam believe that God's prophet prayed throughout Ramadan's last ten days. When he woke in the night he also prayed. The day reminds Muslims of their chance to live a good life. The day also reminds Muslims that Ramadan is coming to an end.

At the conclusion of Ramadan there is a feast called Eid al-Fitr and Muslims traditionally offer the greeting Eid Mubarak. The word Eid means feast or festival. The meaning of Eid Mubarak is blessed celebration.

== See also ==
- Quds Day
