= 2025 Khagrachhari clashes =

Event during Chattogram hill tracts conflict

Khagrachhari Blockade
- Part of Chattogram Hill Tracts conflict
Date	September 23–30, 2025
Location	Khagrachhari District, Chittagong Hill Tracts, Bangladesh
Result	Bangladeshi victory: Blockade of Hill Tracts failed; UPDF militants neutralized
Territorial changes	Parts of Khagrachhari seized by militants and blockading groups in 27–28 September; Bangladesh regains total control of Khagrachhari by 29 September

Belligerents
Bangladesh Bengali nationalist groups	insurgents: UPDF; Jumma Chhatra-Janata; Sampradayik Sahista; Supported by: India; Awami League; (alleged by Bangladesh) Tribal civilian protesters (only during demonstrations)

Commanders and leaders
General Waker-Uz-Zaman	Decentralized leadership

Units involved
Bangladesh Army; Bangladesh Police; Border Guard Bangladesh (reportedly involved); Local ruling party affiliates	insurgent and militant factions Foreign Mercenaries (alleged by Bangladesh)

Strength
Hundreds of security personnel	Unknown number of insurgents Hundreds of militias and protesters (varies)

Casualties and losses
13 military personnel injured Unknown injuries among police	At least 3 killed, dozens injured
- Civilian bystanders injured in clashes
- Triggered by the gang rape of an indigenous schoolgirl in Khagrachhari

The 2025 Khagrachhari clashes or Khagrachhari Blockade were a series of violent confrontations and armed militancy in the Khagrachhari District of the Chittagong Hill Tracts, Bangladesh. The unrest began in September 2025 following the reported gang rape of an indigenous schoolgirl, which sparked widespread outrage and protests by local students, indigenous organizations, and rights groups.

The protests escalated into road blockades, strikes, and clashes with police and ruling party affiliates. Demonstrations spread beyond Khagrachhari, with solidarity rallies and student protests occurring in Dhaka and other cities. On 27 September, security forces opened fire on protestors, leaving at least three people dead and dozens injured.

Rights groups and opposition parties have condemned the violence, calling for justice for the victim and accountability for the killings. Government authorities have promised investigations, while security forces continue operations to disperse demonstrations.

== Background ==
The clashes in Khagrachhari were triggered by the reported gang rape of an indigenous schoolgirl in the hill district in mid-September 2025. The incident provoked outrage among local indigenous communities, students, and rights organizations, who accused the authorities of failing to protect vulnerable groups in the Chittagong Hill Tracts.

Tensions were further heightened by allegations of intimidation and violence against student demonstrators demanding justice. On 11 September, a youth was reportedly beaten to death during an attack on a protest in Dhaka, drawing national attention to the issue and sparking wider student involvement.

The Chittagong Hill Tracts region has long been marked by ethnic and political tensions between indigenous groups and the state, including disputes over land rights, representation, and security. Analysts noted that the Khagrachhari incident resonated with a history of perceived marginalization of the indigenous population, fueling calls for accountability and justice.

== Communal violence ==
Alongside the protests and clashes with security forces, several reports have described the Khagrachhari unrest as involving elements of communal violence between indigenous and Bengali settler communities. According to local media, incidents of arson, property damage, and targeted attacks on homes and shops were reported in parts of Khagrachhari town and surrounding villages.

Prothom Alo and Janakantha noted that the situation escalated beyond student demonstrations when mobs clashed along ethnic lines, raising fears of renewed communal tensions in the Chittagong Hill Tracts, which has a long history of violence between indigenous groups and Bengali settlers.

Witnesses reported that homes and businesses belonging to indigenous residents were attacked, while some Bengali households were also targeted in reprisal violence. Police have claimed that they intervened to prevent further escalation, but human rights groups expressed concern that security forces did not act swiftly enough to protect vulnerable communities.

Mobs under Jumma Chhatra-Janata began to demonstrate in the roads. And they attacked Border Guard men at one point. Several clashes between Bengali mobs and Tribal militias occurred.

== Insurgent uprising ==
Insurgent uprising or armed militancy has occurred during the violence. According to Bangla Tribune, a group referred to as “Sampradāyik Sahisṭa” (communal/indigenous self-defense) has been invoked in certain narratives as mobilizing indigenous youth in Khagrachhari toward a more confrontational stance. But the conflict escalated into guerilla level attacks.

UPDF armed militants has attacked security forces. There have been series of armed confrontations between Security Forces and UDPF, allied tribal militias. 13 Bangladesh Army members were injured by terrorists. The insurgents carried out an armed raid in Guimara against security forces.

UDPF terrorists and other allied militants carried out guerilla attacks that killed 3 Bangladesh Army men.

Jumma Chhatra-Janata ordered a division-wide blockade. However, after deadly militant attacks against Security Forces and Government responses, the blockade was disrupted by Bangladesh Armed Forces. Bangladesh Army was deployed after armed militancy. Curfew was declared and most of terrorists got neutralized by security forces or were forced to retreat.

=== Aftermath ===
Home adviser of Bangladesh blamed India and Awami League for the chaos. The uprising came to end after counterattacks from security forces and deployment of Bangladesh Army in 30 September. Bangladesh Army issued a press briefing where they confirmed that UPDF used local tribal people as "human shields" but government forces maintained discipline. The spokesperson also said local Bengali groups to stay non-violent. The armed militants were Reportedly "foreign terrorists".
