= 2021 Moghbazar explosion =

Catastrophic Event in Bangladesh

Moghbazar explosion
- Date: June 27, 2021
- Time: 7.30 pm BST
- Location: Moghbazar, Dhaka, Bangladesh; 23.7489°N 90.4072°E
- Cause: Gas explosion
- Deaths: 11
- Injuries: 100+

The Moghbazar explosion took place on 27 June 2021 at the wireless gate of Moghbazar in Dhaka, the capital of Bangladesh. At least 7 people were killed and more than 100 injured, out of whom 66 were admitted to various hospitals. Police suspect the incident was caused by frozen gas.

== Casualties and damage ==
Hundreds of people were injured in the blast. Six people were killed. Among the injured, about 66 people are undergoing treatment at the hospital. Most of the injured were from nearby buildings, a few bus passengers and pedestrians.

The three-storey old building on 79 Outer Circular Road on the Mouchak-Magbazar road has partially collapsed. Sounds and blast waves caused by the blast damaged 14 nearby multi-storey buildings. 12 of the buildings are commercial and 2 are residential. In one building was the office of the online news portal 'Aparajey Bangla'. The damaged buildings are: building no. 79 on Outer Circular Road, Rashmono Specialized Hospital, Nazrul School, Arang Showroom, Bishal Center, Dom-Ino Commercial, Best Buy Showroom, Bengal Trades Center, Calcutta Dry Cleaners, Moghbazar Plaza, Hamdard Medical and Sales Center and the Vision Emporium Showroom. The blast also damaged three local buses and wounded their occupants.
