= List of Independence Award recipients (2020–2029) =

Independence Award is Bangladesh's highest civilian honours. This list contains the awardees from 2020 to 2029.

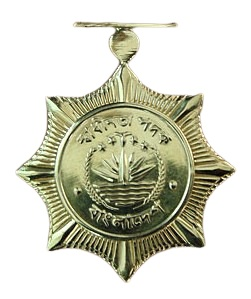
List of Independence Day Award recipients
- 1977–1979
- 1980–1989
- 1990–1999
- 2000–2009
- 2010–2019
- 2020–2029

== 2020 ==
A total of 9 persons and 1 organisation were awarded.

Recipients	Area	Note
Golam Dastagir Gazi	independence and liberation war	
Azizur Rahman	independence and liberation war	posthumous
Commander Abdur Rauf	independence and liberation war	posthumous
Anwar Pasha	independence and liberation war	posthumous
Kalipada Das	culture	
Ferdousi Mazumder	culture	
Professor Dr Md Obaidul Kabir Chowdhury	medical science	
AKMA Muqtadir	medical science	
Bharateswari Homes	education	

Despite receiving the Independence Award for literature in 2020, the controversial medal for Raiz Uddin was declared void due to various criticism.

== 2021 ==
A total of 9 persons and 1 organisation were awarded.

Recipients	Area	Note
AKM Bazlur Rahman	independence and liberation war	posthumous
Ahsanullah Master	independence and liberation war	posthumous
Brigadier General Khushid Uddin Ahmed	independence and liberation war	posthumous
Akhtaruzzaman Chowdhury Babu	independence and liberation war	posthumous
Mrinmoy Guha Neogi	science and technology	
Mahadev Saha	literature	
Ataur Rahman	culture	
Gazi Mazharul Anwar	culture	
M. Amjad Hossain	social work	
Bangladesh Agricultural Research Council	research and training	

== 2022 ==
A total of 10 persons and 1 organisation were awarded.

Recipients	Area	Note
Ilias Ahmed Chowdhury	independence and liberation war	posthumous
Khondkar Nazmul Huda	independence and liberation war	posthumous
Abdul Jalil	independence and liberation war	
Siraj Uddin Ahmed	independence and liberation war	
Mohammad Shahiduddin	independence and liberation war	posthumous
Serajul Huq	independence and liberation war	posthumous
Kanak Kanti Barua	Treatment	
Kamrul Islam	Treatment	
Amir Hamza (Revoked)	Literature	posthumous
Syed Mainul Hossain	Architecture	posthumous
Bangladesh Wheat and Maize Research Institute	research and training	Institution

== 2023 ==
A total of 9 persons and 1 organisation were awarded.

Recipients	Area	Note
Colonel (retd) Shamsul Alam	independence and liberation war	
Lieutenant AG Mohamnmad Khurshid	independence and liberation war	posthumous
Khwaza Nizamuddin Bhuiyan	independence and liberation war	
Mofazzal Hossain Chowdhury	independence and liberation war	
Dr Mohammad Mainuddin Ahmed	Literature	posthumous
Pabitra Mohan Dey	Cultural	
ASM Rakibul Hasan	Sports	
Department of Fire Service and Civil Defence	Social Services/Public Services	
Begum Nadira Jahan	Research and Training	
Dr. Firdausi Qadri	Research and Training	

== 2024 ==
A total of 10 persons were awarded.

Recipients	Area	Note
Kazi Abdus Sattar	Independence and Liberation War	
Flight Sergeant Md Fazlul Haque	Independence and Liberation War	posthumous
Abu Nayeem Md. Najib Uddin Khan	Independence and Liberation War	posthumous
Firoza Khatun	sports	
Mubarak Ahmad Khan	science and technology	
Harishankar Das	treatment	
Mohammad Rafiquzzaman	cultural	
Aranya Chiran	social/public services	
Mollah Obaydullah Baki	social/public services	
SM Abraham Lincoln	social/public services	

== 2025 ==
A total of seven individuals received the award, six of whom were deceased and honored posthumously.

Recipients	Area	Note
Jamal Nazrul Islam	Science/Technology	Posthumous
Sir Fazle Hasan Abed	Social Services	Posthumous
Badruddin Umar (Rejected by recipient)	Education/Research	
Al Mahmud	Literature	Posthumous
Novera Ahmed	Culture	Posthumous
Azam Khan	Liberation War/Culture	Posthumous
Abrar Fahad	Rebel Youth	Posthumous

== 2026 ==
A total of fifteen individuals (seven posthumously) and five institutions received the award.

Recipients	Area	Note
Khaleda Zia	Independence, democracy and women's education	Posthumous
Zafrullah Chowdhury	Social services	Posthumous
Maherin Chowdhury	Social services	Posthumous
Md. Saidul Haque	Social service	
Mohammad Abdul Jalil	Liberation War	Posthumous
Ashraf Siddiqui	Literature	Posthumous
Bashir Ahmad	Culture	Posthumous
Hanif Sanket	Culture	
Kazi Fazlur Rahman	Administration	Posthumous
Zahurul Karim	Science and technology	
Zobera Rahman Linu	Sports	
Mohammad Abdul Baki	Research and training	
Md. Abdur Rahim	Research and training	
Sukomal Barua	Research and training	
Abdul Mukit Majumder	Environmental conservation	
Faujdarhat Cadet College	Liberation War	
Dhaka Medical College	Medicine	
Palli Karma Sahayak Foundation (PKSF)	Rural development	
SOS Children's Villages International in Bangladesh	Public service	
Gonoshasthaya Kendra	Public service	

== See also ==
- List of Independence Day Award recipients (1977–79)
- List of Independence Day Award recipients (1980–89)
- List of Independence Day Award recipients (1990–99)
- List of Independence Day Award recipients (2000–09)
- List of Independence Day Award recipients (2010–19)
