= List of Independence Award recipients (1977–1979) =

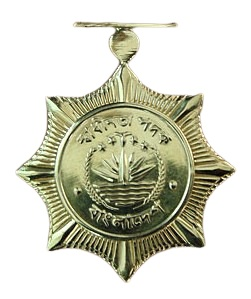
List of Independence Day Award recipients
- 1977–1979
- 1980–1989
- 1990–1999
- 2000–2009
- 2010–2019
- 2020–2029

Independence Award, Bangladesh's highest civilian honours - Winners, 1977-1979:

== 1977 ==
Recipients	Area	Note
Maulana Abdul Hamid Khan Bhashani	social work	posthumous
Kazi Nazrul Islam	literature	The national poet of Bangladesh
Mokarram Hussain Khundker	science and technology	posthumous
Zainul Abedin	arts	posthumous
Mahbub Alam Chashi	rural development	
Brig. Mahmudur Rahman Choudhury	medical science	
Dr. Zafrullah Chowdhury	population control	
Runa Laila	music	
Habildar Mostak Ahmad	sports	
Enayet Karim	welfare	First Ambassador from Bangladesh to USA

== 1978 ==
Recipients	Area	Note
Jasimuddin	literature	posthumous
Dr. Mazharul Haque	education	posthumous
Ranada Prasad Saha	social welfare	posthumous
Dr. Muhammad Ibrahim	social welfare	
Shah Muhammad Hasanuzzaman	science and technology	
Abdul Ahad	music	
Mahfuzul Haque	rural development	
Alamgir M. A. Kabir	population control	

== 1979 ==
Recipients	Area	Note
Abul Mansur Ahmed	literature	posthumous
Dr. Qazi Motahar Hossain	science and technology	
Dr. Muzaffar Ahmed Choudhury	education	posthumous
Firoza Begum	music	
Samar Das	music	
Phuljhuri Khan	music	
Quamrul Hassan	arts	Designed the Flag of Bangladesh
Tahera Kabir	social welfare	
Nur Mohammad Mandal	population control	
