= Baki (surname) =

Baki is the surname of the following notable people:

- Abdullah Hel Baki (born 1989), Bangladeshi sports shooter
- Ákos Baki (born 1994), Hungarian football player
- Anaqi Sufi Omar Baki (born 1990), Bruneian footballer midfielder
- Azam Baki (born 1963), Malaysian government official
- Gari L. Baki Papua New Guinean police officer
- Ghazi Abdel Baki, Lebanese musician, composer, producer
- Ivonne Baki (born 1951), Ecuadorian politician and diplomat
- Mehdi Baki (born 1988), French actor, dancer and choreographer
- Mohammad Abdul Baki (born 1950), Bangladeshi agricultural engineer
- Mollah Obaydullah Baki, Bangladeshi doctor
- Naomi Baki (born 1985), French-South Sudanese author
- Ramadani Baki (born 1943), Chief Minister of Zanzibar
- Selim Baki, Algerian writer and author

== See also ==
- Bakis (surname)
