= Bakis (surname) =

Bakis or Bakış is the surname of the following notable people:

- Henry Bakis (born 1949), Algeria-born geographer
- Hillel Bakis (born 1949), Algeria-born author, editor and publisher
- Kirsten Bakis (born 1967), American novelist
- Sinan Bakış (born 1994), German football forward

== See also ==
- Baki (surname)
