= Aminul Haque (Attorney General) =

Bangladeshi politician

7th Attorney General of Bangladesh
- In office 18 December 1990 – 13 July 1995
- Appointed by: Shahabuddin Ahmed
- President: Shahabuddin Ahmed; Abdur Rahman Biswas
- Preceded by: Rafique Ul Huq
- Succeeded by: M. Nurullah

Personal details
- Born: 4 April 1931 Noakhali, Bengal Presidency, British India
- Died: 13 July 1995 (aged 64)
- Relatives: Sergeant Zahurul Haq (brother)

Aminul Haque (4 April 1931 – 13 July 1995) was a Bangladeshi lawyer. He served as the Attorney General of Bangladesh. He was married to Farida Akhter (d. 2007), a faculty member at Jagannath University. He was the eldest brother of Sergeant Zahurul Haq, who was accused in the Agartala Conspiracy Case and killed by the Pakistan military at Dhaka Cantonment in 1969.

== Career ==
Haque was one of the founding members of Ain-O-Salish Kendra, a non-government, civil rights and legal aid organization in Bangladesh.
