= Bidhan Krishna Sen =

Bengali politician

Bidhan Krishna Sen was a Bengali politician and an accused in the Agartala Conspiracy Case.

== Career ==
In 1968, Sen was charged in the Agartala Conspiracy Case and was released in 1969. During that time Sen and Bibhuti Bhushan Chowdhury were the main liaison between Sheikh Mujibur Rahman and the Indian government. He was the Vice-President of the Chittagong District unit of the Awami League.

Sen worked with Sheikh Mujibur Rahman during the Bangladesh Liberation War. Sen was founding member of the Jatiya Samajtantrik Dal. As acting President of the Jatiya Samajtantrik Dal, Sen called for a movement against the Awami League government led by Sheikh Mujibur Rahman on 22 October 1974.

Sen was part of a team of Jatiya Samajtantrik Dal, along with Serajul Alam Khan, that sought to negotiate with the new government formed after the assassination of Sheikh Mujibur Rahman. Following an appeal by Sen and Abdullah Sarkar, Ziaur Rahman lifted the ban imposed on Jatiya Samajtantrik Dal in 1976 and in 1979 the party won 18 seats in the national election held by President Ziaur Rahman. Sen himself was released from prison in 1978 along with other political prisoners.

== Personal life ==
Sen has a son, Shaibal Sen.

== Death ==
Sen died on 3 May 2004 at the National Institute of Cardio-vascular Disease.
