= Murder of Abrar Fahad =

2019 murder in Dhaka, Bangladesh

- Part of Violence of Bangladesh Chhatra League
- Location: 23°43′36″N 90°23′33″E; BUET, Dhaka, Bangladesh
- Date: October 7, 2019; 7 years ago c. 8:00 pm (UTC+6)
- Victim: Abrar Fahad
- No. of participants: 32 (Note: 25 as per first information report)
- Charges: See the § Trial and sentences section

On October 6, 2019, Abrar Fahad, a second-year student in the Electrical and Electronic Engineering (EEE) department at Bangladesh University of Engineering and Technology (BUET), was murdered inside BUET's Sher-e-Bangla Hall by activists of Chhatra League, the student wing of then ruling party Awami League.

The murder sparked national outrage and led to protests against campus violence. Out of 25 convicts, 20 were given death sentence and the other five were give life sentence in relation to the murder of Abrar Fahad following a highly publicized trial. An autopsy report later confirmed that Fahad died as a result of severe blunt force trauma.

== Background ==
Abrar Fahad
- আবরার ফাহাদ
- Born: February 12, 1998; Kushtia, Bangladesh
- Died: October 7, 2019 (aged 21); Sher-e-Bangla Hall, BUET, Dhaka, Bangladesh
- Cause of death: Blunt force trauma
- Education: Kushtia Zilla School; Notre Dame College; Bangladesh University of Engineering and Technology
- Known for: Circumstances of his death
- Parents: Barkat Ullah (father); Rokeya Khatun (mother)
- Awards: Independence Award (2025)

Abrar Fahad was born on February 12, 1998, in the village of Radhanagar, Kumarkhali, Kushtia, Bangladesh. His father, Barkat Ullah, was a banker at BRAC Bank, while his mother, Rokeya Khatun, was a homemaker.

Abrar began his formal education at Kushtia Mission Primary School before moving on to Kushtia Zilla School, where he completed his Secondary School Certificate (SSC) exam. After completing SSC, he was admitted to Notre Dame College in Dhaka, where he completed his Higher Secondary Certificate (HSC) examination under the Dhaka Board. Abrar was offered admission to several universities, including the University of Dhaka and Dhaka Medical College.

Despite his mother's desire for him to study medicine, Abrar chose to pursue engineering, enrolling in the Electrical and Electronic Engineering (EEE) department at Bangladesh University of Engineering and Technology (BUET). At BUET, Abrar maintained his academic focus and became involved in several clubs, including the BUET Energy Club.

== Murder ==
Abrar Fahad was found dead in Room 2011 of Sher-e-Bangla Hall at BUET. He had been staying in Room 1011 of the same dormitory. Abrar had gone home on leave 10 days earlier, intending to stay until October 20. However, with exams approaching, he decided to return to his hall to focus on his studies.

On October 4, Mehedi Hasan Robin, the Organizing Secretary of the BUET Chhatra League, reportedly gave instructions in a group chat to beat up Abrar. This information came to light following a confession from Ifti Mosharraf Shakal, the group's Deputy Social Service Secretary. Amit Saha, the Deputy's Law Secretary, suggested waiting until Abrar returned from his home.

On the night of October 6, 2019, Abrar was brought to Room 2011, along with his two mobile phones and laptop. At that point, Mujtaba Rafid, the Deputy Office Secretary of BUET Chhatra League, and Khandaker Tabakkharul Islam Tanvir, a third-year Mechanical Engineering student, inspected his phones. Meanwhile, Muntasir Al Jemi, a second-year student from the same department, checked his laptop. During this, Mehedi Hasan Robin began slapping Abrar.

Shamsul Arefin Rafat, a second-year Mechanical Engineering student, brought a cricket stump, which Ifti Mosharraf Shakal used to hit Abrar multiple times until it broke. Later, Anik Sarkar, the Information and Research Secretary of BUET Chhatra League and a fourth-year Mechanical Engineering student, repeatedly beat Abrar on his knees, legs, arms and the soles of his feet with another stump. Meftahul Islam Zion, the Sports Secretary, also slapped Abrar and hit him on the knees with a cricket stump.

Meanwhile, Mehedi Hasan communicated with the General Secretary of the BUET Chhatra League, Rasel Mehedi Hasan, over the phone. By around 10:30 PM, Abrar was lying on the floor, weakened from the beating. Ifti Mosharraf Shakal forced him to stand up and slapped him. Mujahidur Rahman, a third-year Electrical Engineering student, then hit him with a skipping rope. Ifti Mosharraf Shakal continued to strike Abrar's knees and legs with a stump, and Khandaker Tanvir repeatedly slapped him. Around 11 PM, Anik Sarkar entered the room again and hit Abrar with a stump and the group eventually left the room around midnight.

Abrar, struggling to breathe, was given two pillows under his head by Ifti Mosharraf Shakal. Abrar vomited several times. The group then moved him to Room 2005 of the dormitory. Amit Saha tried to extract more information from Abrar, suggesting they continue beating him to get more details. Realizing his condition was deteriorating, Amit suggested they take him out of the hall.

Mehedi Hasan and Anik Sarkar went into Room 2005, allegedly thought that Abrar seemed somewhat stable, and left. Shortly after, Abrar vomited again. Mehedi Hasan talked about handing him over to the police. Members of the 17th batch then carried Abrar to the ground floor on a mattress. During this time, Mehedi Hasan Rasel, the General Secretary, was coordinating with the police.

When Muntasir Al Jemi informed Ifti Mosharraf Shakal that Abrar's condition had worsened, Shakal suggested massaging him. Ismail and Monir called for an ambulance, but due to a delay, Tamim brought a doctor from BUET Medical Center.

At 3 AM on Monday, police recovered Abrar's body from the ground floor of BUET's Sher-e-Bangla Hall. Medical Officer Dr. Md. Mashuk Elahi declared him dead around the same time. CCTV footage from the second floor of the dormitory showed several individuals dragging Abrar by his hands and feet down a corridor.

Footage also revealed that at 3:26 AM, the Director of BUET's Student Welfare Council, Professor Mizanur Rahman, stood beside the body and had a conversation with the suspects before leaving. The next day, he claimed he knew nothing about the incident until the morning. Abrar's phone and laptop were in the possession of Chhatra League members, making it impossible for any of his friends to inform his family immediately after his death.

Eventually, they obtained the contact number of Abrar's younger brother, Abrar Faiyaz, from a BUET student named Diganta who used to tutor him. Faiyaz was called, and it was through him that the family learned about his death. News of Abrar's death spread fear among the students of Sher-e-Bangla Hall. Many were too scared to share information, fearing retaliation from Chhatra League members. A few students from the 17th batch decided to write a message and posted it across all BUET-related Facebook pages and groups, including the Alumni Association.

This helped the news spread gradually. Initially, when Abrar was in a critical condition, Chhatra League leaders planned to hand him over to the police, labeling him as a "Shibir activist" (a term used for members of the student wing of Bangladesh Jamaat-e-Islami). One leader at the scene even called the Duty Officer at Chawkbazar Police Station, stating, "We have caught an activist; come take him away." A police patrol team was dispatched to Sher-e-Bangla Hall following this call. However, a security guard at the hall, who wished to remain anonymous, told Bangla Tribune, "A police vehicle arrived and asked where the activist was, but the Chhatra League did not allow them to enter the hall afterward".

=== Facebook involvement ===
Abrar's classmates suggested that his death might have been related to his Facebook posts. In a status update, Abrar criticized the signing of bilateral agreements with India during Prime Minister Sheikh Hasina's four-day official visit.

In his post, he discussed the Indian use of the Mongla Port, the withdrawal of water from the Feni River, and the import of LPG from Bangladesh. The post reads:

1. After the partition in 1947, there was no seaport in the western part of the country. The then Pakistan government requested India to use the Kolkata Port for six months, but the response was dismissive. Consequently, the Mongla Port was opened prematurely to combat 1974 famine. Ironically, India now seeks to use the Mongla Port.

2. There were headlines a few years ago about disputes over the sharing of water from the Kaveri River between Karnataka and Tamil Nadu. In contrast, we are willing to supply 150,000 cubic meters of water daily without exchange.

3. A few years ago, North India ceased exporting coal and stones to protect its resources, yet we are providing them with gas, even though our own factories are shut due to a gas shortage.

Perhaps the poet wrote in search of such happiness:

'For others' sake, I say Give all your life and mind, Is there such happiness anywhere That you forget yourself?' (Translated from Bengali)

== Aftermath ==
=== Protests ===
Several hundred students from the University of Dhaka held a protest at the base of the Anti Terrorism Raju Memorial Sculpture. Teachers and students from Jahangirnagar University also organized a human chain on their campus, demanding the capital punishment for Abrar's killers. Students from Islamic University in Kushtia blocked the Kushtia-Khulna highway in protest of the killing. Teachers from the university also joined in, holding a human chain to call for justice for Abrar's murder.

In Khulna, students from Khulna University blocked the main road in front of their campus, wearing black badges and forming a human chain at the university's main gate to protest Abrar's death. At the University of Chittagong, female residential students brought out a procession followed by a human chain in front of the Shaheed Minar on the campus, demanding the death penalty for those involved in the killing.

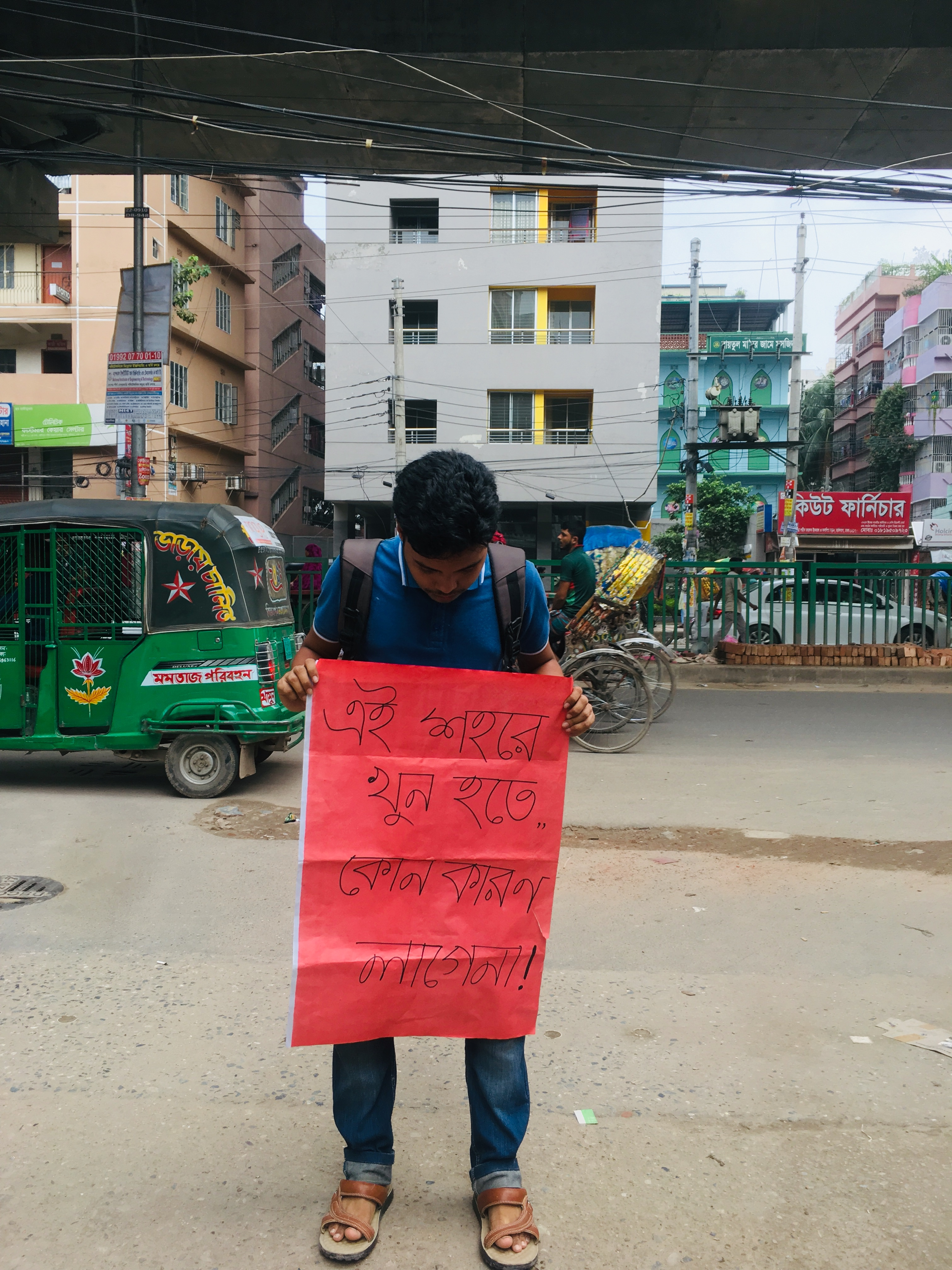
A poster in Bengali saying "you don't need a reason to murder someone in this city" referring to Abrar Fahad.

Students from Rajshahi University staged a demonstration and blocked the Rajshahi-Dhaka highway for half an hour, protesting the killing. Students from Shahjalal University of Science and Technology also formed a human chain at the main entrance of the Sylhet campus. Later, they organized a protest march, which circled the Sylhet-Sunamganj highway. Students in other districts, including Mymensingh, Comilla, Noakhali, Barisal, Bogura, Gazipur, Manikganj, Jessore, Patuakhali, Brahmanbaria, Tangail, and Rajbari, also held human chains.

Celebrities also voiced their protest. Lyricist Prince Mahmud, filmmaker Mostofa Sarwar Farooki, playwright Masum Reza, drama director Chayanika Chowdhury, film director Redoan Rony, actor Zayed Khan, actress Moushumi Hamid, and musician Konal expressed their sorrow and protest on social media regarding this incident.

In 2024, a renewed effort by the Chhatra League to reintroduce student politics at BUET faced widespread resistance, sparking protests and a boycott of academic activities across the university.

=== BUET administration response ===
In response to widespread protests across Bangladesh, the BUET administration implemented measures to enhance campus safety. These measures include:

- Prohibiting student politics influenced by political parties, even though organizational politics had already been banned on the university campus.
- Temporarily expelling 19 individuals implicated in the murder, with permanent expulsion for those named in the charge sheet.
- Covering all legal expenses related to Abrar's murder case and providing compensation to his family.
- Reviewing past harassment incidents on campus and establishing an online platform for filing complaints.
- Installing CCTV cameras and monitoring systems in all student halls.

=== Post-July Revolution ===
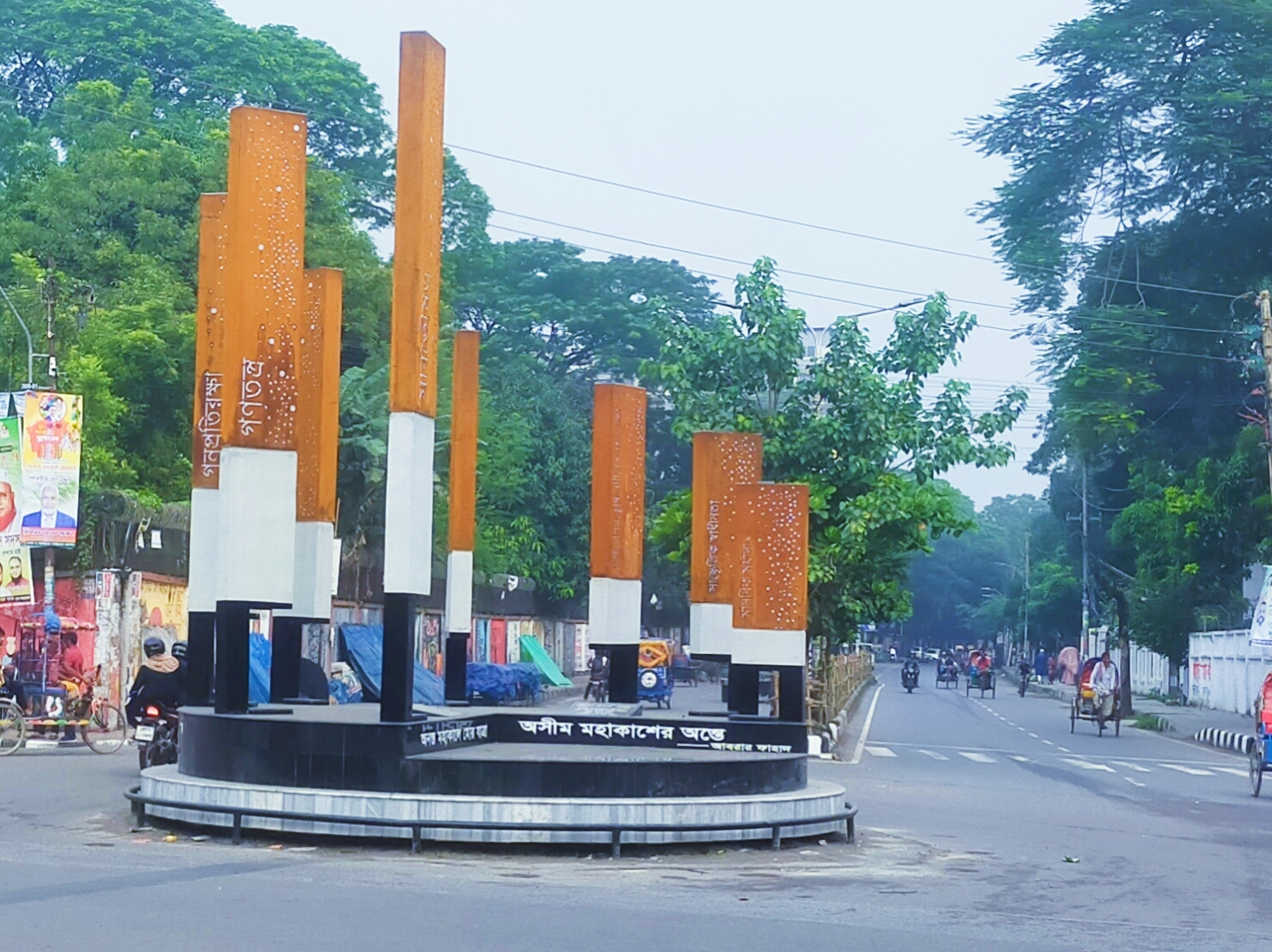
The Eight Pillars Against Aggression, commemorating martyr Abrar Fahad. Palashi Roundabout, Dhaka

During this period, both government and private institutions organized various commemorative events, seminars, and cultural programs centered around Abrar Fahad, portraying him as a symbol of free thought, sovereignty, and freedom of expression.

Following the fall of the Awami League government, on 25 March 2025, the government officially renamed Bangabandhu Avenue as Shaheed Abrar Fahad Avenue.

In the post-July uprising period, various government advisers, student leaders, and cultural figures described Abrar Fahad as a symbol of free expression and the protection of national interests. During a state event, Information and Broadcasting Adviser Md. Mahfuz Alam and Local Government Adviser Asif Mahmud Sajib Bhuiyan referred to him as “a symbol of resistance against aggression,” while members of civil society characterized him as “an inspiration for the July uprising.” Around the same time, the Ministry of Cultural Affairs decided to include Abrar Fahad's death anniversary in the national commemorative calendar. However, there were differing opinions in academic circles; many researchers viewed Abrar not merely as a symbol of the July 2024 uprising but as part of a broader historical continuum of social discontent and organized protest.

=== Notable comment ===
On 7 October 2025, at the R. C. Majumdar Arts Auditorium of the University of Dhaka, during the seminar “Indian Hegemony and Bangladesh's Sovereignty: In Memory of Shaheed Abrar Fahad” and the inauguration of the art exhibition “In Memory and Reflection: Shaheed Abrar Fahad,” the Vice President (VP) of the Dhaka University Central Students’ Union (DUCSU), Abu Shadik Kayem, remarked that martyr Abrar Fahad had become “a more powerful symbol in death than in life, and that he continued to serve as a guiding inspiration for youth against domination and aggression.”

At a public rally in Dhaka, Sharif Osman Hadi, the spokesperson of the Inquilab Mancha, stated, “Abrar Fahad has become a symbol of Bangladesh. We visited his grave in Kushtia. His mother told us, ‘May no other son share my son's fate.’ We want Bangabandhu Avenue to be renamed ‘Shaheed Abrar Fahad Avenue.’”

In the same context, the editor of the newspaper Amar Desh, Mahmudur Rahman, said, “Abrar and I were students of the same department. He was killed because he spoke against Indian hegemony. In our country, under the guise of progressivism, Islamophobia and pro-India sentiment have been nurtured. Abrar's story is the story of our generation's courage.”

== Reaction ==
=== International ===
- United States: The U.S. Embassy in Bangladesh, through a statement by Ambassador Earl R. Miller posted on its official Facebook page, affirmed, "Freedom of expression is a fundamental right in any democracy. We join all voices calling for a comprehensive investigation and extend our heartfelt condolences to his family".
- United Kingdom: The British High Commission in Dhaka posted on their official Facebook page stating they are "Shocked and saddened by events at BUET" and affirming that the "UK stands unconditionally for free speech, media freedom, human rights and the rule of law".
- France: The French Embassy in Dhaka, in a statement posted on its Facebook page, also said: "We are deeply shocked and saddened by the killing of a Buet student."
- Germany: The Embassy of Germany in Dhaka posted on their official Facebook page stating, "The embassy would like to express its heartfelt sympathy to the family and friends of the student and calls on everybody to advocate freedom of expression emphasizing the importance of this keystone of democracy".

=== Organisations ===
- United Nations: UN Resident Coordinator Mia Seppo called for quick investigation and justice in the incident, stating, "Freedom of speech is a human right, and nobody should be harassed, tortured or killed for exercising it".

Amnesty International condemned the murder as a "heinous crime requiring urgent investigation." The organization stated that "Abrar was simply exercising his right to freedom of expression through his Facebook posts criticizing the government."

Brad Adams, Asia Director at Human Rights Watch, remarked, "A government that overlooks torture, enforced disappearances, extrajudicial killings by security forces, and arbitrary arrests of dissenters fosters an environment where students can operate a 'torture cell' on a university campus."

Asian Forum for Human Rights and Developments member organisation Odhikar condemned the killing and "expresses grave concern on this situation of lawlessness and culture of fear".

== Trial and sentences ==
Eventually, eighteen members of the BUET Chhatra League were detained in connection with the murder.

Later on, 25 people were convicted in the Abrar Fahad murder case. All of them were students at the Bangladesh University of Engineering and Technology (BUET) and members of the Bangladesh Chhatra League (BCL). The Dhaka Speedy Trial Tribunal-1 sentenced 20 of them to death and 5 to life imprisonment on December 8, 2021.

Chawkbazar Police Station Case dated October 7, 2019
| Serial | Name of the accused | BUET identity | BUET roll | BUET expulsion | BCL identity | BCL expulsion | Current status | Court verdict |
|---|---|---|---|---|---|---|---|---|
| 1 | Mehedi Hasan Russell | Civil Engineering, '13 Batch | 1304098 | Expelled for life | General Secretary | Permanently expelled | Arrested | Sentenced to death |
| 2 | Muhtasim Fuad Hossain | Civil Engineering, '14 Batch | 1404010 | Expelled for life | Vice President | Permanently expelled | Arrested | Life imprisonment |
| 3 | Md. Anik Sarker Appu | Mechanical Engineering, '15 Batch | 1510083 | Expelled for life | Information and Research Secretary | Permanently expelled | Arrested | Sentenced to death |
| 4 | Mehedi Hasan Robin | Chemical Engineering, '15 Batch | 1502050 | Expelled for life | Organizational Secretary | Permanently expelled | Arrested | Sentenced to death |
| 5 | Ifti Mosharraf Sokal | Biomedical Engineering, '16 Batch | 1618027 | Expelled for life | Assistant Social Welfare Secretary | Permanently expelled | Arrested | Sentenced to death |
| 6 | Md. Moniruzzaman Monir | Water Resources Engineering, '16 Batch | 1616028 | Expelled for life | Literary Secretary | Permanently expelled | Arrested | Sentenced to death |
| 7 | Md. Meftahul Islam (Zion) | Marine Engineering, '15 Batch | 1512047 | Expelled for life | Sports Secretary | Permanently expelled | Arrested | Sentenced to death |
| 8 | Md. Majeedur Rahman Majeed | MME Department, '17 Batch | 1711023 | Expelled for life | BCL Member | | Arrested | Sentenced to death |
| 9 | Md. Mujahidur Rahman Mujahid | EEE Department, '16 Batch | 1606116 | Expelled for life | BCL Member | Permanently expelled | Arrested | Sentenced to death |
| 10 | Khandakar Tabakkarul Islam (Tanveer) | Mechanical Engineering, '16 Batch | 1610100 | Expelled for life | BCL Member | | Arrested | Sentenced to death |
| 11 | Hossain Mohammad Toha | Mechanical Engineering, '17 Batch | 1710123 | Expelled for life | BCL Member | | Arrested | Sentenced to death |
| 12 | Md. Akash Hossain | Civil Engineering, '16 Batch | 1604194 | Expelled for life | BCL Member | | Arrested | Life imprisonment |
| 13 | Md. Shamim Billah | NME Department, '17 Batch | 1712054 | Expelled for life | | | Arrested | Sentenced to death |
| 14 | ASM Najmus Sadat | Mechanical Engineering, '17 Batch | 1710108 | Expelled for life | BCL Member | | Arrested | Sentenced to death |
| 15 | Md. Morshed Amartya Islam | Mechanical Engineering, '17 Batch | 1710141 | Expelled for life | | | Arrested | Sentenced to death |
| 16 | Muaz Abu Huraira | EEE Department, '17 Batch | 1706106 | Expelled for life | BCL Member | | Arrested | Life imprisonment |
| 17 | Muntasir Al Zemi | Mechanical Engineering, '17 Batch | 1710087 | Expelled for life | BCL Member | Permanently expelled | Fugitive (Note: Prison escaped on 6 August 2024) | Sentenced to death |
| 18 | Amit Saha | Civil Engineering, '16 Batch | 1604151 | Expelled for life | Legal Assistant Secretary | Permanently expelled | Arrested | Life imprisonment |
| 19 | Ishtiaq Ahmed Munna | Mechanical Engineering, '15 Batch | 1510069 | Expelled for life | Publication and Editorial Secretary | | Arrested | Life imprisonment |
| 20 | Md. Shamsul Arefin Rafat | Mechanical Engineering, '17 Batch | 1710103 | Expelled for life | | | Arrested | Sentenced to death |
| 21 | Md. Mizanur Rahman | Water Resources Engineering, '16 Batch | 1616004 | Expelled for life | | | Arrested | Sentenced to death |
| 22 | SM Mahmud Setu | Chemical Engineering, '14 Batch | 1402004 | Expelled for life | Former Vice President | | Arrested | Sentenced to death |
| 23 | Morshed-Uz-Zaman Mondol Jisan | EEE Department, '16 Batch | 1606154 | Expelled for life | Member of Chhatra League | | Fugitive | Sentenced to death |
| 24 | Ehteshamul Rabbi (Tanim) | Civil Engineering, '17 Batch | 1704135 | Expelled for life | Member of Chhatra League | Permanently expelled | Fugitive | Sentenced to death |
| 25 | Mujtaba Rafid | Chemical Engineering, '16 Batch | 1602017 | Expelled for life | Assistant Office Secretary | Permanently expelled | Fugitive | Sentenced to death |
| 26^{*} | Ashikul Islam Bitu | Chemical Engineering, '16 Batch | 1602016 | Expelled for life | Assistant Editorial Secretary | | Participated in class with court stay order | |
| 27^{*} | Mohammad Galib | MME, '16 Batch | | Temporary expulsion | | | | |
| 28^{*} | Saiful | | | Temporary expulsion | | | | |
| 29^{*} | Abu Nawsad Sakib | | | Temporary expulsion | | | | |
| 30^{*} | Mo. Shaon Mia | | | Temporary expulsion | | | | |
| 31^{*} | Sakhawat Iqbal Abhi | | | Temporary expulsion | | | | |
| 32^{*} | Mo. Ismail | | | Temporary expulsion | | | | |

- ^* Name not mentioned in the First information report (Bengali: এজাহার)

=== Prison escape ===
On 5 August 2024, following the fall and exile of Sheikh Hasina, a death sentenced convict, Muntasir Al Zemi, escaped from the prison along with two hundred other prisoners during a prison breakout. The latter's family was informed about the incident, six months after the escape.

== Legacy ==
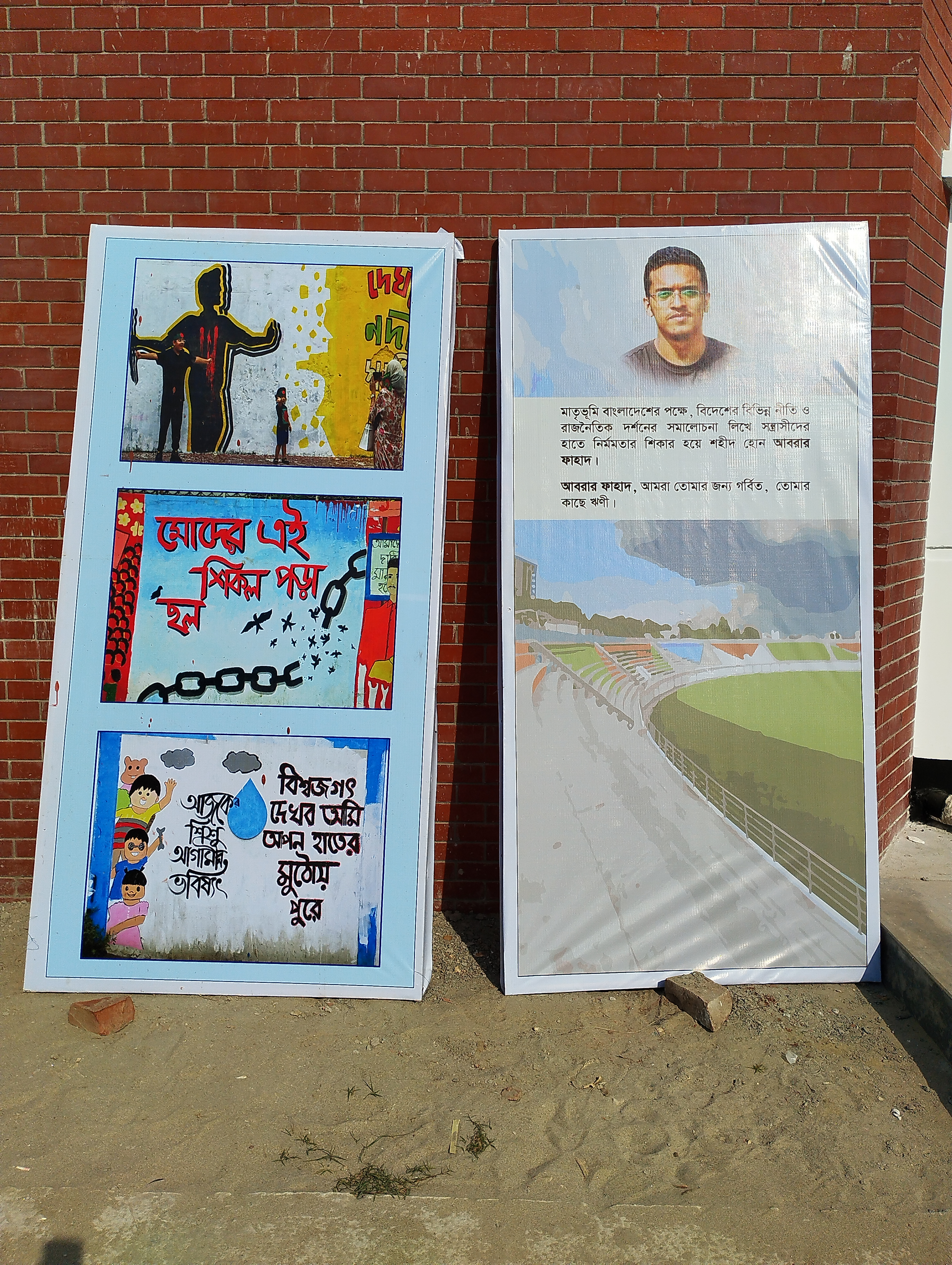
Inaugural festoon of Shaheed Abrar Fahad Stadium

In 2022, Fahad's younger brother, Abrar Faiyaz, cleared the admission test for BUET, the same institute where Abrar was murdered. He added, "I took the decision upon discussing the matter with my family members".

In October 2024, a short film titled Room Number 2011 was released, named after the dorm room where he was killed. Directed by Sheikh Jisan Ahamed, the film was based on the events surrounding his death and the subsequent impact on student politics and free speech.

Abrar's death also played a part in catalyzing broader political movements in Bangladesh, culminating in what has been referred to as the "July Revolution". This movement saw mass protests against the government, calling for greater democratic freedoms, transparency, and a pushback against oppressive political practices.

On the fifth anniversary of Fahad's death, a foundation stone was laid after a memorial meeting organized under the banner of "Abrar Fahad Smriti Sangsad" at Plassey intersection in Dhaka. Vice-Chancellor of Bangladesh University of Engineering and Technology A. B. M. Badruzzaman inaugurated the foundation stone of the memorial. They also demanded the government to announce October 7, the day of Abrar's death, as the 'National Anti-Aggression Day'.

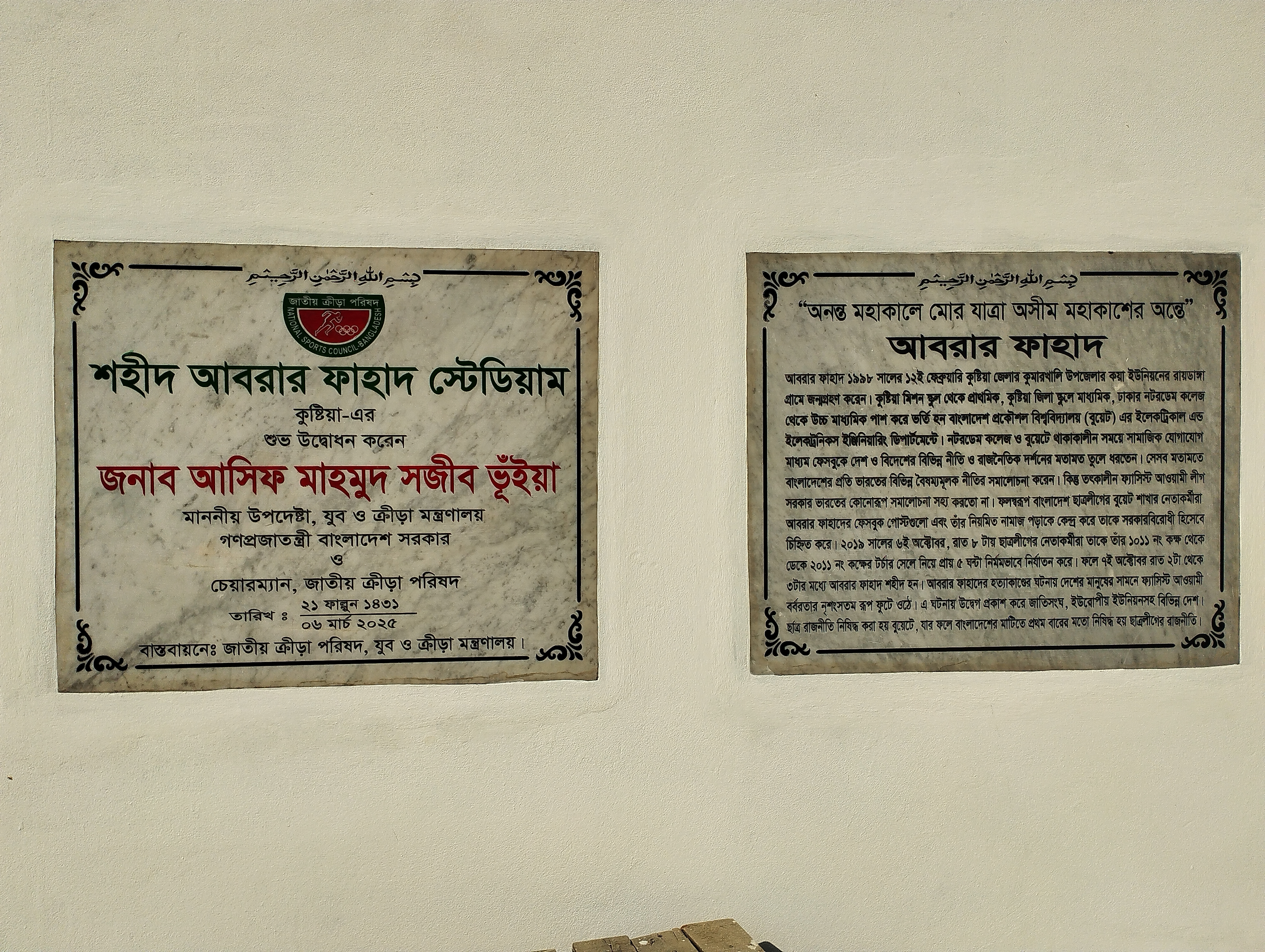
Inaugural plaque of Shaheed Abrar Fahad Stadium

In 2025, the Kushtia Stadium was renamed Shaheed Abrar Fahad Stadium, commemorating him, and the same year, Fahad was awarded the Independence Award, which is the highest civilian honour in Bangladesh posthumously.

In March 2025, Bangabandhu Avenue was renamed Shaheed Abrar Fahad Avenue.

On 6 October 2025, the government of Bangladesh declared that the death anniversary of Abrar Fahad would be observed annually on 7 October.

On October 7, a memorial structure was inaugurated at Palashi Square adjacent to Bangladesh University of Engineering and Technology in memory of him.

== In popular culture ==
=== Fiction ===
Abrar Fahad has also been reflected in Bangladeshi fiction in various ways. At the 2025 Amar Ekushey Book Fair, writer and researcher Mita Ali's debut novel Akar was a notable addition to this trend. The novel was published by Itibritta Prakashani and displayed at stall no. 459 of the fair.

== See also ==
- Chhatra League's guest room practice
- Human Rights in Bangladesh
