= Khurshid Uddin Ahmed =

Bangladesh Army Brigadier General (1933–2013)

- খুরশিদ উদ্দিন আহমেদ
- Born: 19 March 1933; Gafargaon, Bengal Presidency, British India
- Died: 22 April 2013 (aged 80); Dhaka, Bangladesh
- Education: Dhaka Medical College
- Military career
- Allegiance: Pakistan; Bangladesh
- Branch: Pakistan Army; Bangladesh Army
- Service years: 1958–1982
- Rank: Brigadier General
- Unit: Army Medical Corps
- Commands: Commandant of CMH, Comilla; Commandant of CMH, Dhaka; Commandant of Army Medical Corps Centre and School
- Conflicts: Operation Desert Hawk; Indo-Pakistani War of 1965; Bangladesh Liberation War; 1973 Arab–Israeli War
- Awards: Independence Day Award

Khurshid Uddin Ahmed (19 March 1933 – 22 April 2013) was a Bangladesh Army brigadier general who served in the Bangladesh Liberation War in 1971. He was posthumously awarded the Independence Day Award in 2021.

== Early life and education ==
Ahmed was born on 19 March 1933 in Gafargaon Upazila, Mymensingh District, British India (now Bangladesh). His father, Abdur Rahman, was a deputy superintendent of police. He completed his matriculation from Lohajong Pilot High School in 1948. In 1950 he completed his I.Sc from Dhaka College. In the same year, he was admitted to Dhaka Medical College. He was a student at Dhaka Medical College during the Bengali language movement in 1952.

== Military career ==
He was commissioned as a lieutenant in Army Medical Corps of the Pakistan Army on 19 May 1958. He was posted to the 5th Field Ambulance. While working there, he completed the Army Commando Course. In 1960 he was deputed to the Pakistan Navy and was posted to PNS Jahangir; he was made a lieutenant of the navy. In 1964 he returned to the army and was posted to Quetta. He participated in the Indo-Pakistani War of 1965. He was an accused in the 1968 Agartala Conspiracy Case. In 1969 he was promoted to the rank of major and was dismissed from the army.

=== Liberation War of Bangladesh ===
After the crackdown by the Pakistan Army, Major Khurshid escaped from Dhaka and went to Keraniganj. In Keraniganj he gave training to the new soldiers. Later he joined the Delta Headquarters of Sector 2 under the command of Major Khaled Mosharraf. He wanted to fight on the battlefield, but the C-in-C of Bangladesh Forces General M.A.G. Osmani, ordered him to join the medical services. He played a crucial role in establishing the Army Medical Crops of the Bangladesh Army. In September 1971, the Army Medical Corps of the Bangladesh Army was founded, and Squadron Leader Shamsul Haque was appointed as the director general of the Directorate General of Medical Services. He and Major Shamsul Alam were appointed as assistant director general of medical services (eastern sector) and assistant director general of medical services (western sector), respectively. He actively participated in the Belonia Operation.

=== Bangladesh Army ===
He was appointed as the commanding officer of Combined Military Hospital, Comilla, on 9 December 1971. He was promoted to the rank of lieutenant colonel on 1 April 1972. He also served as the acting brigade commander of the 44th Infantry Brigade in the absence of Brigade Commander Ziaur Rahman. In June 1972, he was appointed the commanding officer of Combined Military Hospital, Dhaka. He was sent to the 1973 Arab–Israeli War as the head of the Bangladesh Army medical team. He was later sent to Libya and served there as a chest specialist. Upon his return from Libya, he was promoted to the rank of brigadier.

== Personal life ==
He was married to Noor Jahan Begum in 1964.

== Death and legacy ==
He died on 22 April 2013 in Dhaka. He was posthumously awarded the Independence Day Award in 2021.
