= List of Independence Award recipients (2000–2009) =

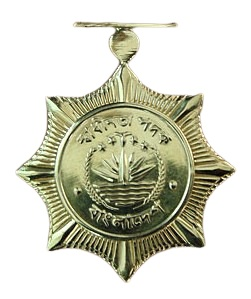
List of Independence Day Award recipients
- 1977–1979
- 1980–1989
- 1990–1999
- 2000–2009
- 2010–2019
- 2020–2029

Independence Award, Bangladesh's highest civilian honours - Winners, 2000-2009:

== 2000 ==
Ten individuals were awarded.

Recipients	Area	Note
Syed Shamsul Haque	literature	
Binod Bihari Chowdhury	social work	
Ajit Roy	music	
Ustad Khurshid Khan	music	
Sardar Fazlul Karim	education	
Shahabuddin	painting	
Maulana Abdur Rashid Tarkabagish	literature	
M. A. Rab	liberation war	
Sultana Kamal	sports	
Rokanuzzaman Khan	children organizer	

== 2001 ==
Recipients	Area	Note
Sayeda Motahera Banu	literature	
Shaheed Mashiur Rahman	liberation war	
Alhaz Zahur Ahmed Chowdhury	liberation war	
M. A. Aziz	liberation war	
Muhammad Mayezuddin	liberation war	
Late Ruhul Quddus	liberation war	
Aminuddin	liberation war	
Dr. Zikrul Haque	liberation war	
Ashfaqur Rahman Khan	liberation war	
M. R. Akhtar Mukul	journalism	
Bangladesh Cricket Board	sports	organization

== 2002 ==
Four individuals and one organization were awarded.

Recipients	Area	Note
Hasan Hafizur Rahman	literature	
Barin Majumder	music	
Abdul Latif	music	
S. A. Bari	liberation war	
Dhaka Ahsania Mission	social work	organization

== 2003 ==
Two individuals were awarded.

Recipients	Area	Note
Sheikh Mujibur Rahman	liberation War	posthumous
Ziaur Rahman	liberation war	posthumous

== 2004 ==
Seven individuals and three organizations were awarded.

Recipients	Area	Note
Oli Ahad	liberation war	
Comrade Moni Singh	liberation war	posthumous
Brig (retd) Prof Abdul Malik	medical science	
Muhammad Siddiq Khan	education	posthumous
Abu Ishaque	literature	posthumous
Altaf Mahmud	culture	posthumous
Valerie Ann Taylor	social work	
Bangladesh Ansar and VDP	sports	organization
Rural Development Academy	rural development	organization
Sandhani	social work	organization

== 2005 ==
One individual and one organization were awarded.

Recipients	Area	Note
Mujibul Huq		
International Centre for Diarrhoeal Disease Research, Bangladesh		institution

== 2006 ==
Two organization were awarded.

Recipients	Area	Note
Rapid Action Battalion	social work	organization
Bangladesh Betar	liberation war	organization

== 2007 ==
In the year 2007, two organizations were awarded:

Recipients	Area	Note
Bangladesh Army	liberation war	organization
BRAC	social work	organization

== 2008 ==
Three individuals and 1 organization were awarded.

Recipients	Area	Note
Dr. Syed Muhammad Shamsuzzoha	liberation war	
Dr. Govinda Chandra Dev	liberation war	
Rehman Sobhan	research and training	
Bangladesh Rifles	liberation war	organization

== 2009 ==
Four personalities received the award in 2009.

Recipients	Area	Note
Abdul Gaffar Choudhury	literature	
Abdul Matin	culture	
Professor A M Harun-or Rashid	science and technology	
Ivy Rahman	social welfare	posthumous
