= Md Fazlul Haque =

Md Fazlul Haque was a flight sergeant of the Pakistan Air Force and a veteran of the Bangladesh Liberation War. He was an accused in the Agartala Conspiracy Case along with fellow Flight Sergeant Zahurul Haq. Both men were shot in custody by their Pakistani guards which resulted in the death of Zahurul Haq. Protests over the death culminated in the 1969 East Pakistan mass uprising.

In 2024, Prime Minister Sheikh Hasina awarded him the Independence Award, the highest civilian award of Bangladesh, for his contribution to the Bangladesh Liberation War.
