= Ruhul Quddus =

Bangladeshi bureaucrat

Ruhul Quddus was a former bureaucrat of Bangladesh. He is the first and only secretary general of the Cabinet of Bangladesh and the first Principal Secretary of the Prime Ministers' Office.

Quddus was an accused in the Agartala Conspiracy Case along with future President of Bangladesh Sheikh Mujibur Rahman.

== Career ==
Quddus joined the Civil Service of Pakistan in 1949. He served as the chief magistrate of Dhaka.

Quddus was accused in the Agartala Conspiracy Case along with Sheikh Mujibur Rahman in 1968. Along with him, two other civil servants were charged in the case Ahmed Fazlur Rahman and Khan Shamsur Rahman who were Bengalis. He was defended by Khan Bahadur Mohammad Ismail.

Quddus was the secretary general of the Cabinet of Bangladesh. During the Bangladesh Liberation War, he was tasked with taking over the bureaucracy of East Pakistan. After the Bangladesh Liberation War ended, he went to Dhaka Airport on 18 December 1971 to receive the government of Bangladesh in exile. Abul Fateh accompanied him, and they were the highest government authority in Dhaka till the return of the government in exile. He chaired the first cabinet meeting of Bangladesh on 23 December.

After Sheikh Mujibur Rahman returned to Bangladesh, Quddus was appointed Principal Secretary of the Prime Ministers' Office and the post of secretary general of the Cabinet of Bangladesh was abolished. He represented Bangladesh in negotiations with India.

== Personal life ==
Quddus's daughter is Dr. Rezina Quddus.
