= Ashfaqur Rahman Khan =

Bangladeshi activist (died 2023)

- আশফাকুর রহমান খান
- Born: 1941/1942
- Died: 14 July 2023 (aged 81); Dhaka, Bangladesh

Ashfaqur Rahman Khan (1941/1942 – 14 July 2023) was a Bangladeshi activist who was the founding organiser of Swadhin Bangla Betar Kendra. He played an important role in narrating and broadcasting the historic 7 March speech on that radio station. He was awarded Independence Day Award in 2011 by the government of Bangladesh for his contribution to liberation war.

Khan died in Dhaka on 14 July 2023, at the age of 81.
