= Abdul Jalil (sergeant) =

Former sergeant of Pakistan Air Force

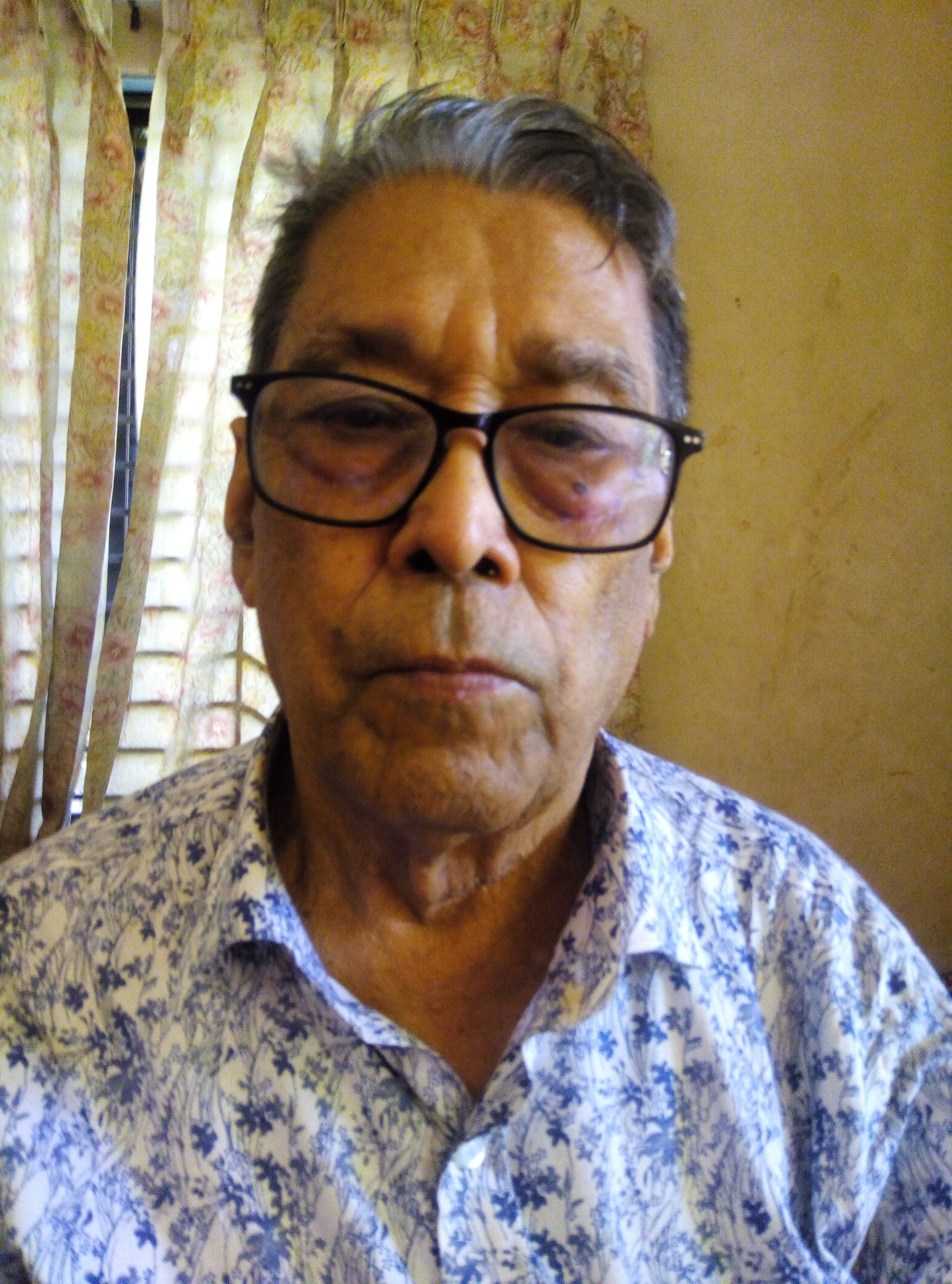
- Military career
- Allegiance: Pakistan
- Branch: Pakistan Air Force
- Rank: Sergeant

Abdul Jalil is a former sergeant of the Pakistan Air Force and accused in the famous Agartala Conspiracy Case. He is a recipient of the Independence Day Award, the highest civilian award in Bangladesh.

== Career ==
Jalil was part of a conspiracy that sought India's help for the independence of Bangladesh. In response the Pakistani government detained them and filed the Agartala Conspiracy Case. Jalil was part of Biplabi Sangstha, an organization of Bengali soldiers in the Pakistan military services, that sought to work for the independence of Bangladesh. He trained other soldiers in the use of grenades; one of which was presented as evidence in the case and is preserved in the Bijoy Ketan Museum of Dhaka Cantonment. Jalil was sent into forced retirement from the Pakistan Air Force and subsequently could not join the Bangladesh Air Force.

Since the Independence of Bangladesh in 1971, the government of Bangladesh has framed the case as a conspiracy to foil the Six point movement in the history textbooks of the country. Jalil has called that a historical distortion as the accusations in the case were true.

In December 2015, Prime Minister Sheikh Hasina donated 3 million taka from government funds to Jalil.

In 2022, Jalil was awarded the Independence Day Award by Prime Minister Sheikh Hasina for his contribution to Bangladesh Liberation War. There had been demands in the past that the government award all the accused in the conspiracy case with the Independence Day Award.
