= Zahurul Karim =

Bangladeshi agriculturist

- Born: 15 August 1948 (age 78)
- Education: Bangladesh Agricultural University
- Awards: Independence Award, 2026 & National Environment Award, 2020
- Scientific career
- Fields: Agriculturist, Academic, Scientist, former civil servant

Zahurul Karim (born 15 August 1948) is a Bangladeshi agriculturist and former government official. During his long career, he worked as a university teacher, scientist and later as a civil servant. He last served as Secretary of the Ministry of Fisheries and Livestock. In 2026, he awarded the highest civilian honour award, Independence Award, in recognition of his contribution to Research and training.

== Early life and education ==
He was born on 15 August 1948 in Chhoto Haran village of Brahmanbaria District. After studying at Annada School and Brahmanbaria College, he completed his bachelor's and master's degrees from Bangladesh Agricultural University. He stood first in BSc (Ag) in 1968 and first in MSc (Agronomy) in 1969 at the same university. He later earned a PhD degree from University of Reading in the United Kingdom in 1978.

== Career ==
After graduating from Bangladesh Agricultural University, Karim joined the same university as a teacher. Later, he served as Director General of Bangladesh Rice Research Institute from 24 January 1996 to 8 January 1997.

He also worked at the Bangladesh Agricultural Research Institute, Bangladesh Agricultural Research Council and the Ministry of Fisheries and Livestock in different positions. On 2 January 1997, he was transferred from the post of Director General of the Bangladesh Rice Research Institute and appointed Executive Chairman of the Bangladesh Agricultural Research Council.

He served as Secretary of the Ministry of Fisheries and Livestock from 11 January 2001 to 26 October 2002.

He was closely involved with several scientific organizations. In Bangladesh, he was elected a Fellow of Bangladesh Academy of Sciences and later served as its vice-president. He was also elected a Fellow of The World Academy of Sciences in recognition of his international scientific contributions.

== Awards and honours ==
- Independence Award, 2026
- National Environment Award, 2020
