= Mrinmoy Guha Neogi =

Bangladeshi agricultural scientist

- মৃন্ময় গুহ নিয়োগী

Personal details
- Born: 1 January 1957 (age 69) Tangail
- Awards: Independence Award (2021)

Mrinmoy Guha Neogi (born 1 January 1957) Is a Bangladeshi agricultural scientist. He was awarded the Independence Award in 2021 for his contribution to science and technology.

== Award ==
- Independence Award (2021)
