= Shaheed Abrar Fahad Stadium =

Sports stadium in Bangladesh

Coordinates: 23°53′42.79″N 89°06′56.46″E

- Kushtia Stadium
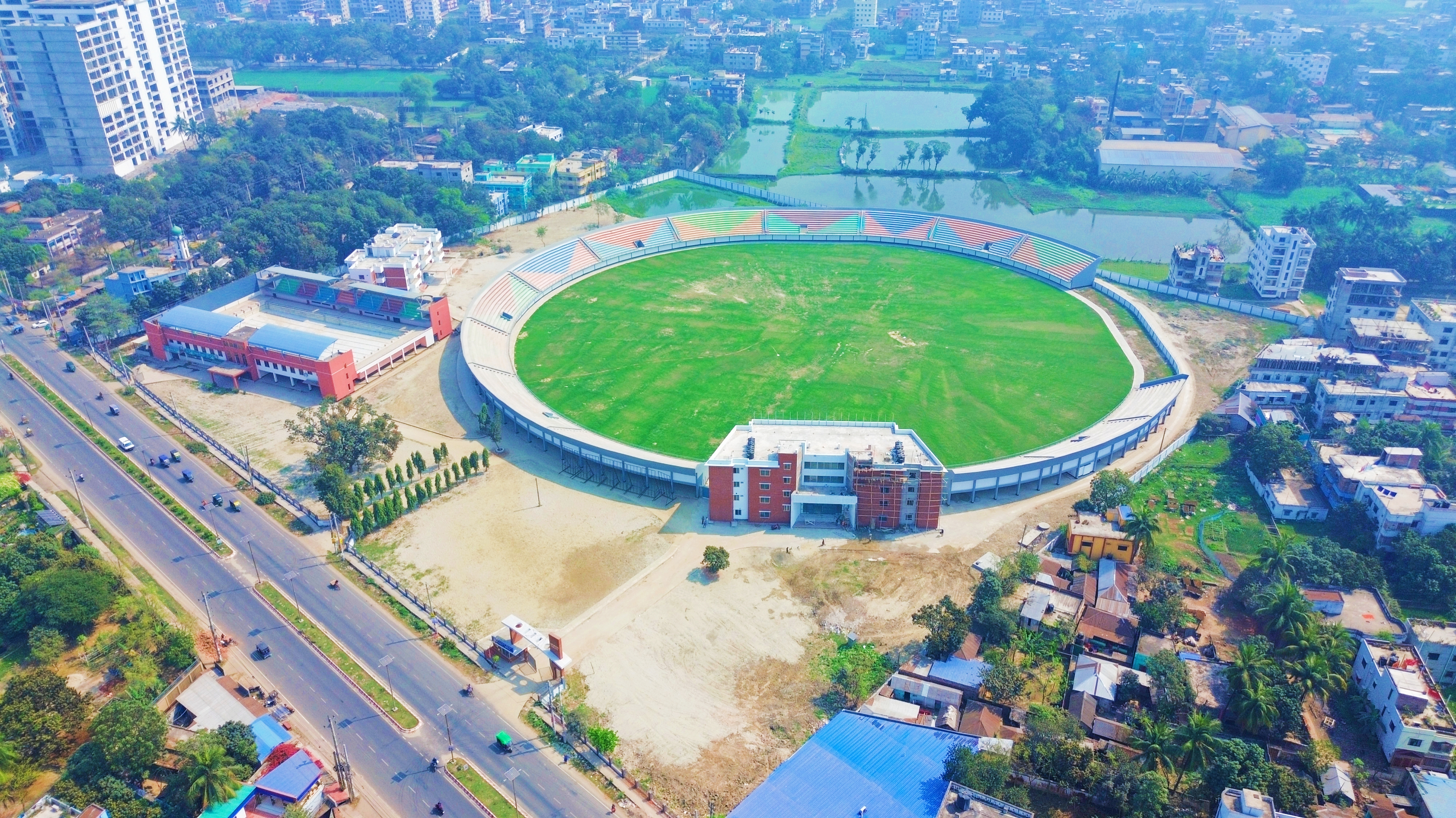
- Renovated Shaheed Abrar Fahad Stadium
- Interactive map of Shaheed Abrar Fahad Stadium
- Former names: Sheikh Kamal Stadium (2020–2024)
- Location: Kushtia, Bangladesh
- Owner: Ministry of Youth and Sports
- Operator: National Sports Council
- Surface: Grass

Construction
- Built: 1979; 47 years ago
- Renovated: 2020–2025
- Cost: ৳4.4 billion (2020–2025)

Tenants
- Kushtia Cricket Team; Kushtia Football Team

Shaheed Abrar Fahad Stadium, also known as Kushtia Stadium, (formerly named Sheikh Kamal Stadium), is a district-level sports venue located in Kushtia, Bangladesh. Established in 1979, it is the largest stadium in the Khulna Division.

== Naming ==
The stadium was renamed in 2025, after Abrar Fahad a student of BUET following the July Revolution. Fahad was extra-judicially killed by the members of Awami League student wing Chhatra League during the rule of Bangladesh Awami League.

== Gallery ==
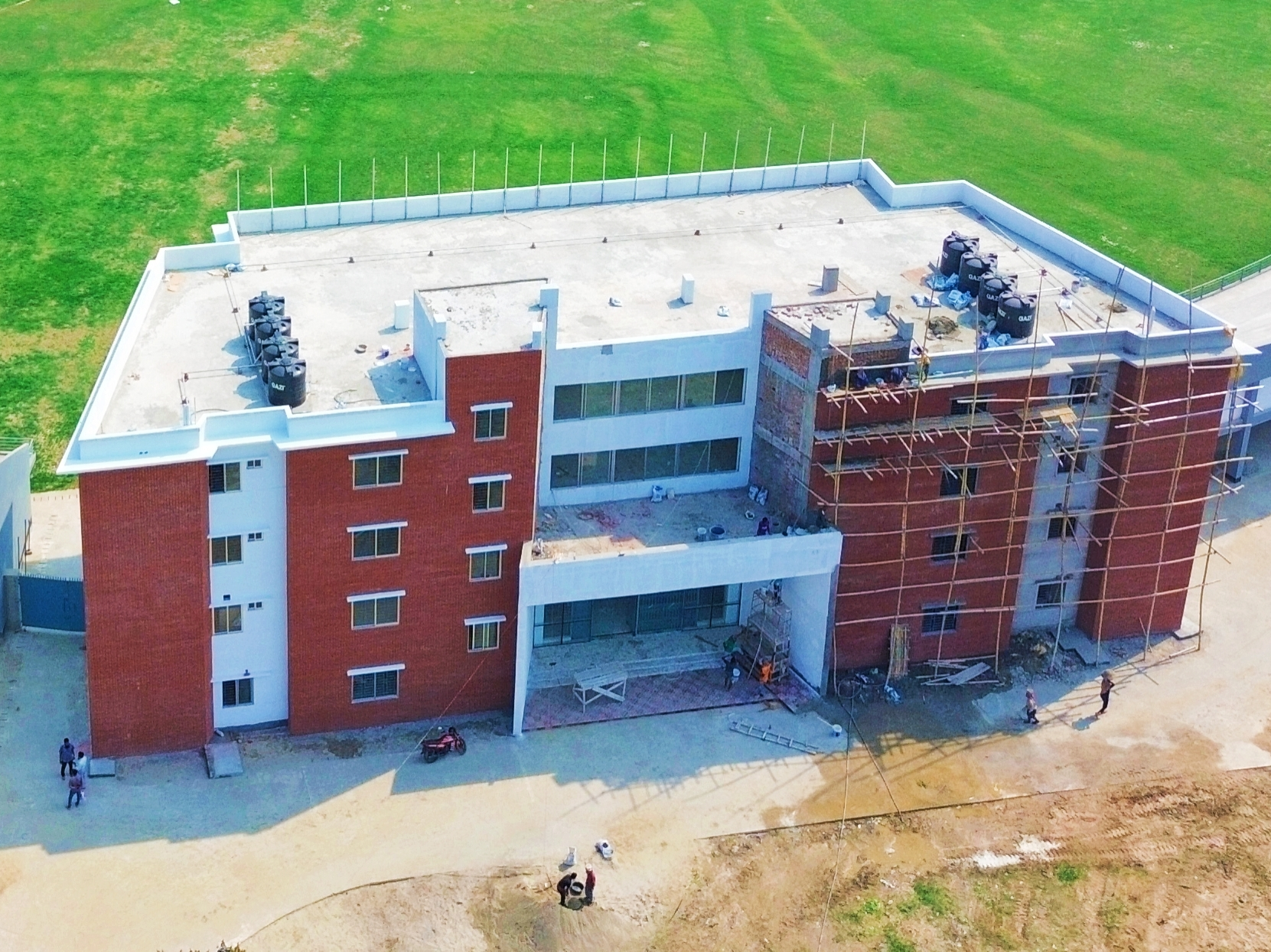

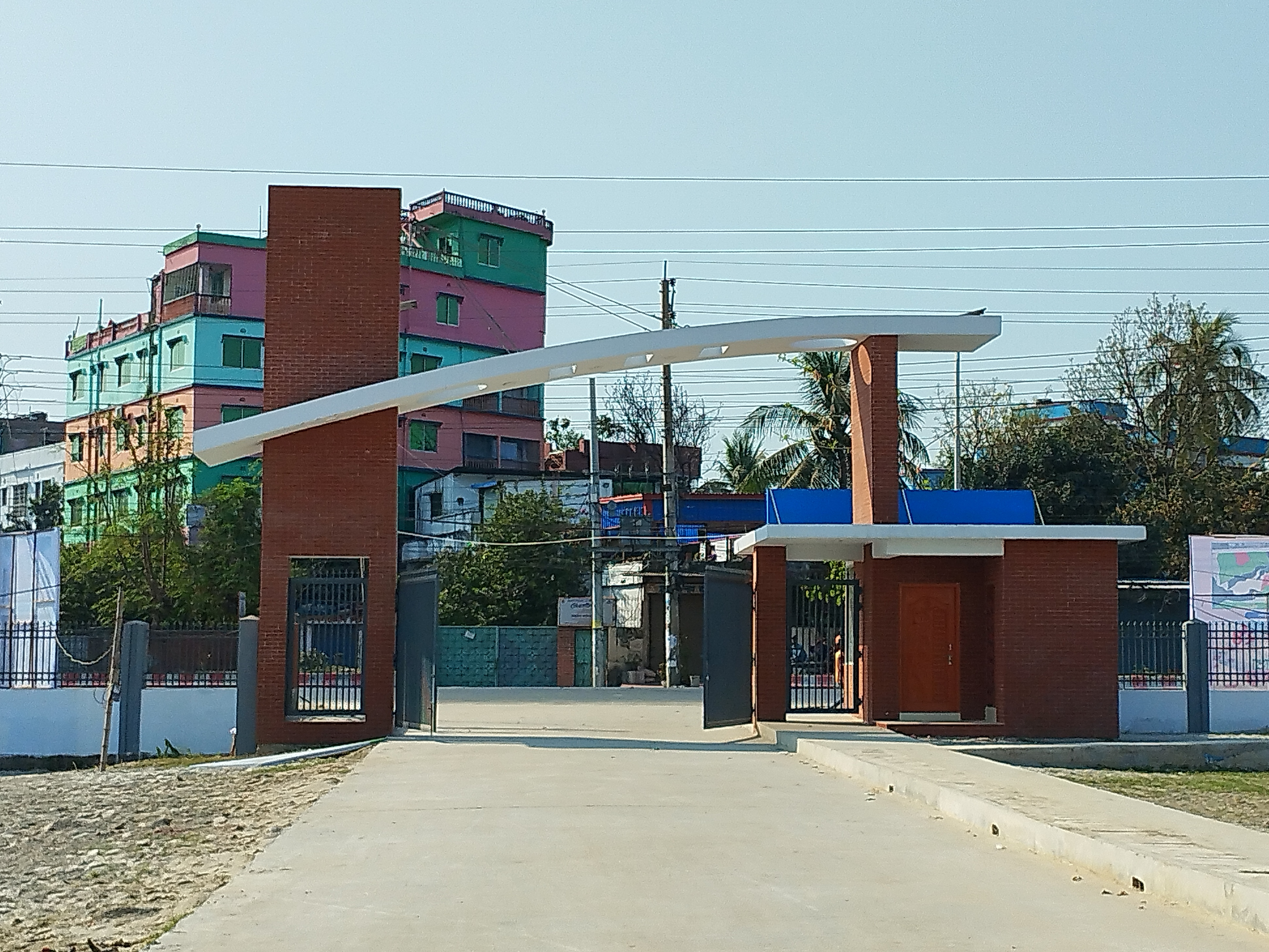
Main entrance gate viewed from inside

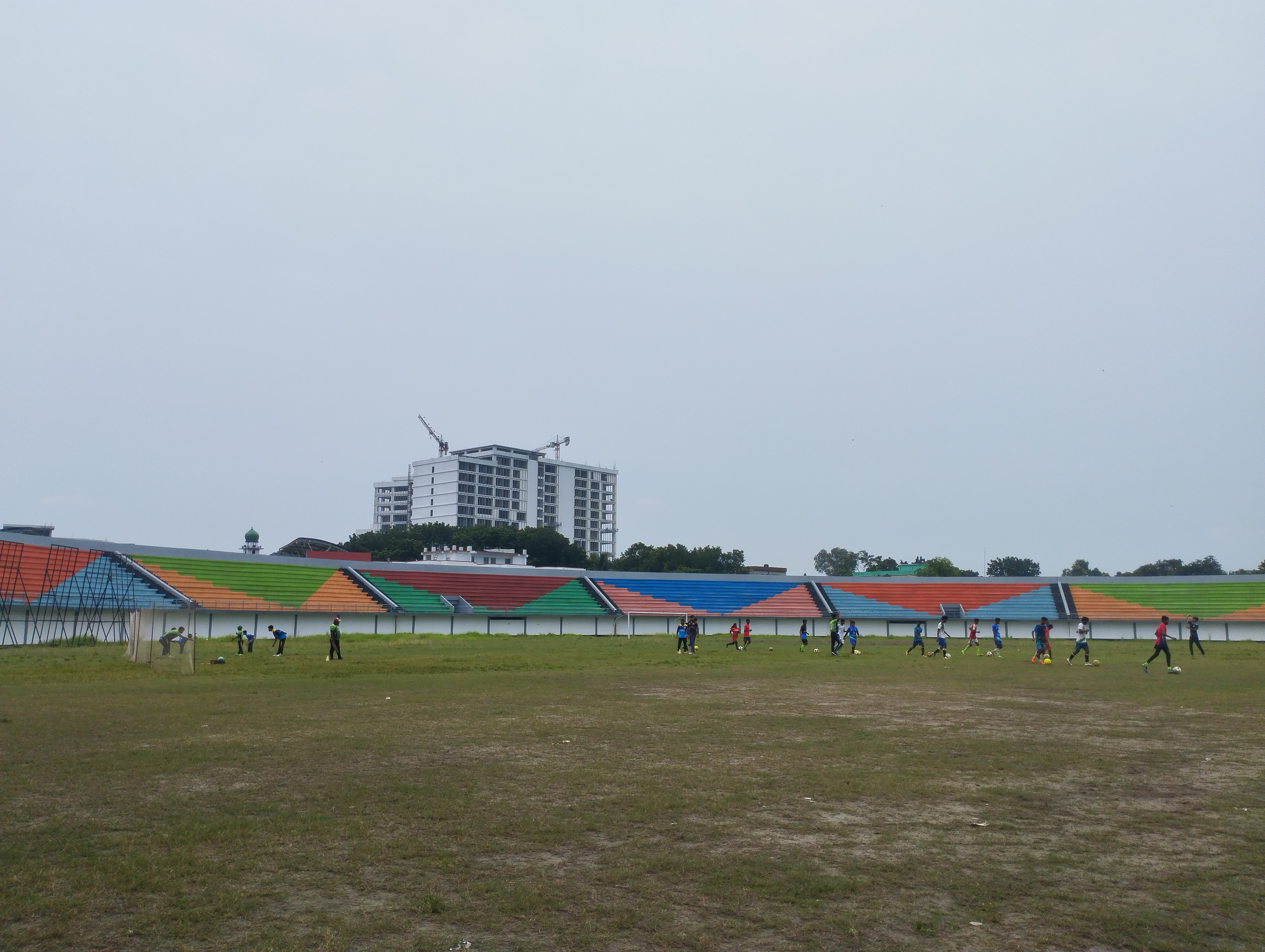
Interior view

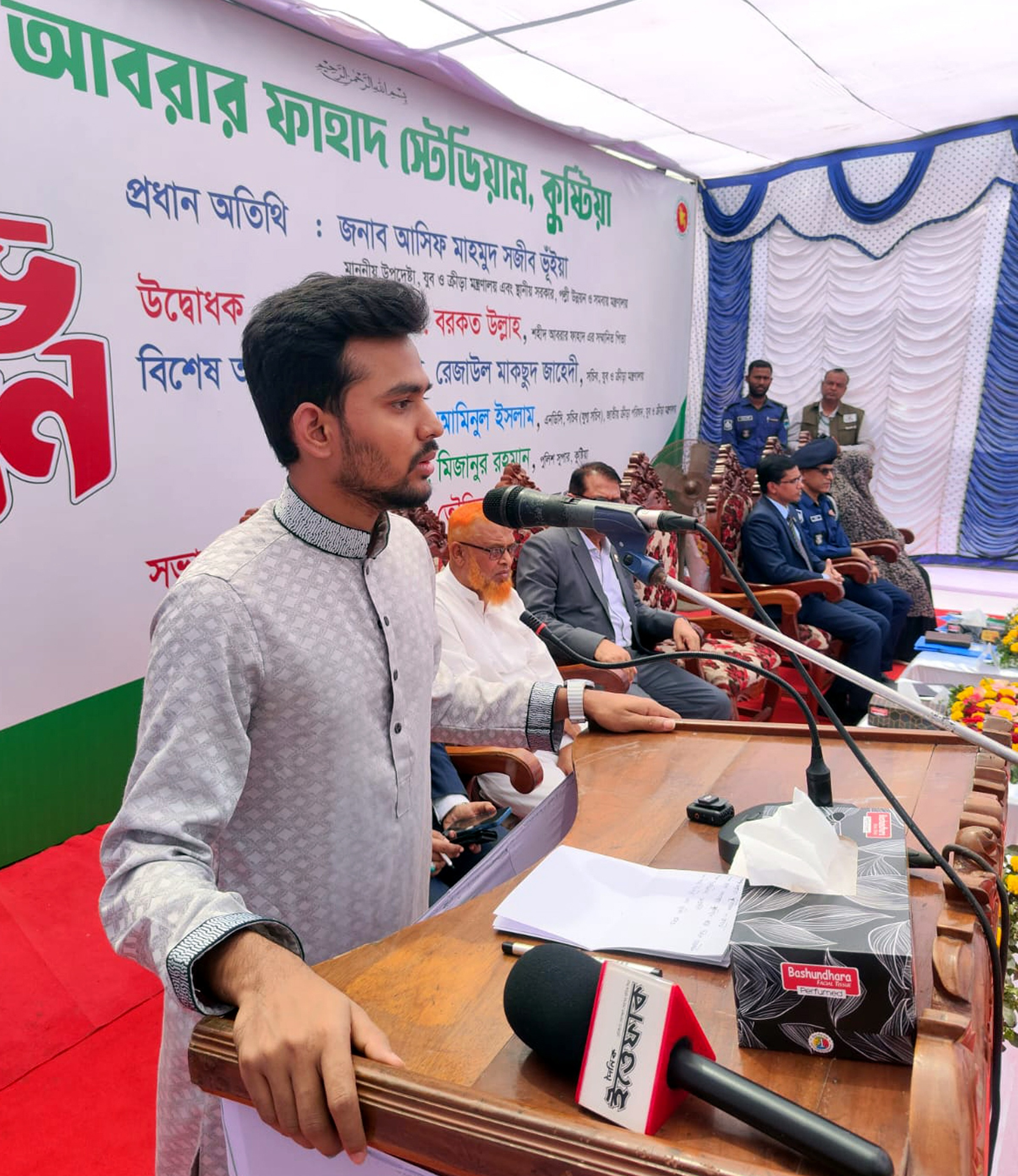
Asif Mahmud at the inauguration ceremony in 2025

== See also ==
- Abrar Fahad
- Indian influence in Bangladesh
- Stadiums in Bangladesh
- List of cricket grounds in Bangladesh
- Sher-e-Bangla National Cricket Stadium
