= Raziuddin Bhuiyan =

Raziuddin Bhuiyan was a Bengali politician, industrialist, and member of the East Pakistan Legislative Assembly.

== Biography ==
Bhuiyan was born in 1910 in Belagi, Monohardi Upazila, Narsingdi District, East Bengal, British Raj. His wife, Zohra Begum Kazi, was the first Bengali Muslim physician.

Bhuiyan died on 10 January 1963 at Dacca Medical College Hospital following a Coronary Thrombosis.
