= Rafique Ul Huq =

Bangladeshi lawyer (1935–2020)

Barrister Rafique Ul Huq
- রফিক-উল হক

6th Attorney General of Bangladesh
- In office 7 April 1990 – 17 December 1990
- Appointed by: Hussain Muhammad Ershad
- President: Hussain Muhammad Ershad; Shahabuddin Ahmed
- Preceded by: M. Nurullah
- Succeeded by: Aminul Haque

Personal details
- Born: 2 November 1935 Calcutta, Bengal Presidency, British India
- Died: 24 October 2020 (aged 84) Dhaka, Bangladesh
- Education: University of Calcutta
- Occupation: Lawyer
- Awards: full list

Rafique Ul Huq (2 November 1935 – 24 October 2020) was a Bangladeshi lawyer who served as the Attorney General of Bangladesh in 1990.

== Background and education ==
Huq was born in Calcutta on 2 November 1935 to Nurjahan Begun and Momin Ul Huq. He earned his MA and LLB degrees from Calcutta University in 1957 and 1958 respectively. He became a Barrister-at-Law in 1961 and called to the Lincoln's Inn in 1962.

== Career ==
Huq enrolled as an advocate in Calcutta High Court in 1960. He joined the High Court at Dhaka in 1962 and enrolled as an advocate in Supreme Court of Pakistan in 1965. In 1975, he joined as a senior advocate in Appellate Division of the Supreme Court of Bangladesh. He served as the Attorney General of Bangladesh from 7 April 1990 until 17 December the same year.

Huq participated in thousands of cases and almost 500 of his cases were reported on in law literature. He was particularly prominent in corporate and company law. In the post independence period he worked with the regime of Bangladesh's first president Sheikh Mujibur Rahman to draft laws, including the 1972 Nationalisation Order. Under President Ziaur Rahman (1977–81) he drafted laws to reverse this order. After the end of Rahman's military rule he successfully challenged laws that had been passed to indemnify the murderers of Sheikh Mujibur Rahman.

Huq served as the chairman at Bangladesh Bar Council Tribunal and Bar Council Election Tribunal during 1975–1976. He was a member of the Company Law Reform Committee in 1977. He played a key role in enacting several laws including the Bangladesh Bank Orders and those relating to private investment. Huq served on the committee to develop the Bangladeshi share market. In 1990 Huq served on the Bar Council of Bangladesh. He was an elected member of the Executive Committee on International Taxation of the World Association of Lawyers, World Executive Committee, Foreign Trade and Investment and Bangladesh Delegate to the UN General Assembly in 1990. Huq was also a member of the International Chamber of Commerce for Asia and the International Court of Arbitration.

Huq served as the counsel of the then Bangladesh Awami League President Sheikh Hasina and Bangladesh Nationalist Party Chairperson Khaleda Zia when they were charged for corruption cases during 2006–08 Bangladeshi political crisis.

== Personal life ==
Huq married Farida Huq, a doctor, in 1960. They were married until her death in 2011. The couple had a son Faheemul Huq, a barrister who resides in Canada.

Huq survived cancer in 1986 and afterwards contributed to improving healthcare provision for the poor. He established the Subarna Clinic in 1995, assisted in founding the Dhaka Children's Hospital and constructed a new 100-bed hospital at Kaliakair. Huq chaired the Department of Microbiology at Birdem General Hospital, the Nurjahan Ward at the Ahsania Mission Cancer Hospital and the Ad-Din Medical College Hospital.

After his wife's death and surgery to his left leg in January 2017, Huq became increasingly reluctant to leave his Dhaka house. Huq died on 24 October 2020, aged 84. He had suffered from geriatric complications including anemia and urinary problems in Ad-Deen Hospital in Dhaka.

== Awards ==
- Khan Bahadur Ahsanullah Gold Medal (2017)
- Mother Teresa of Calcutta Gold Medal given by the US Senate
- Award of Appreciation by Ibrahim Cardiac Hospital
- Sponsor Award of Freedom Fighters Museum.
- Award by MCCI for contribution to health and hygiene and by Rotary Club of Dhaka South Lions Club.
