= Kazi Abdus Sattar =

Kazi Abdus Sattar is a veteran of Bangladesh Liberation War and recipient of Bir Protik, the third highest gallantry award of Bangladesh. In 2023, he was posthumously awarded the Independence Award, the highest civilian award of Bangladesh, by Prime Minister Sheikh Hasina for his contribution to the Bangladesh Liberation War. He was born in the Kazi family of Gopalpur, Kalkini Upazila, Madaripur District. He was a physician and politician. His daughter, Zohra Begum Kazi, was the first female Muslim doctor of Bengal.
