= Zohra Begum Kazi =

1st Bengali Muslim Physician

- জোহরা বেগম কাজী
- Kazi
- Born: 15 October 1912; Rajnandgaon, British India
- Died: 7 November 2007 (aged 95); Dhaka, Bangladesh
- Education: Lady Hardinge Medical College
- Occupation: Medical professional

Zohra Begum Kazi (15 October 1912 – 7 November 2007) was the first Bengali Muslim female physician. She was awarded the Tamgha-e-Pakistan in 1964, Begum Rokeya Padak in 2002, and the Ekushey Padak in 2008.

== Early life and family ==
Kazi was born in Rajnandgaon, British India now in Chhattisgarh, India. She has been called the Florence Nightingale of Dhaka. Kazi came from Kazi family of Gopalpur in the Madaripur District in what was then Bengal. Her father, Kazi Abdus Sattar was also a physician and a politician. At the age of 32, Kazi married a lawmaker, Razuddin Bhuiyan MLC MP, the only son of the Zamindar of Hatirdia in Monohardi Upazila, Narsingdi District. She was widowed in 1963. Although she did not have any children of her own, Kazi adopted and educated many children from impoverished families throughout Bangladesh.

Her eldest brother Kazi Ashraf Mahmud was a Hindi poet. He retired as a professor of botany, Dhaka University. Mahmud is most noted for a controversial book of correspondence between Mahatma Gandhi and himself, published privately immediately after the partition of India. Kazi's family was closely tied to Mahatma Gandhi and several prominent Indian and later Pakistani politicians of that era. Ashraf served as the secretary general of All India Students Federation when Kazi Nazrul Islam was the organizations president.

Her youngest sister Shirin Kazi was also a physician, and a poet. She was noted as being the first Bengali female doctor to obtain a DRCOG degree in 1951. Shirin Kazi later specialized in pediatrics. She was also known for having adopted and raised several children from less fortunate families.

All three siblings once lived in Sevagram, the ashram established by Mahatma Gandhi in Nagpur, India. Zohra Kazi also volunteered at Mahatma Gandhi's Sevashram (which later gave birth to the Mahatma Gandhi Institute of Medical Sciences) providing free medical care for the poor. She also served as an honorary secretary of the Kasturba Gandhi Hospital.

== Education ==
Kazi obtained her MBBS degree in 1935 from Lady Hardinge Medical College for Women in Delhi. She ranked First Class First and was awarded the Viceroy of India's Medal (Freeman Freeman-Thomas, 1st Marquess of Willingdon, GCSI, GCMG, GCIE, GBE, PC (12 September 1866 – 12 August 1941)).

Kazi completed her FCPS degree and received a scholarship from the Royal College of Obstetricians and Gynaecologists in London and obtained DRCOG degree. She continued her studies in London and obtained FRCOG and MRCOG degrees. Upon her return to East Bengal (then renamed East Pakistan), she joined Dhaka Medical College and Hospital as a professor and Head of the Department of Obstetrics and Gynecology.

== Career ==
During her long career, Kazi held several key positions in medicine. Kazi was posthumously awarded the Ekushey Padak in February 2008 for her notable social work. During her lifetime, she also received several other distinctions and acknowledgements for her contributions, both medical and philanthropic, to society.

On 21 February 1952, Kazi is said to have organized emergency treatment for the wounded students of the Bengali language movement. During the Bangladesh Liberation War in 1971, she sought out and provided medical attention to the wounded Freedom Fighters. Throughout her life, she took an active interest in the well-being of all her patients and the children she delivered.Kazi died on 7 November 2007 at the age of 95.

== Documentary ==
In 2007, a documentary film titled Zohra Kazi was released in Bangladesh. The film was directed by Mahbubul Alam Taru. The documentary illustrates Kazi's life and her success; her lifelong fight against illogical superstitions and backward beliefs, convincing uneducated female patients all over India and Bangladesh, the need for modern medical treatment.
