= AG Mohammad Khurshid =

AG Mohammad Khurshid was a Bangladesh Air Force lieutenant who was awarded the Independence Award, the highest civil award of Bangladesh, posthumously in 2023. He was given this award by Prime Minister Sheikh Hasina for his contribution to the Bangladesh Liberation War.
