= Eight Pillars Against Aggression =

- আগ্রাসনবিরোধী আট স্তম্ভ
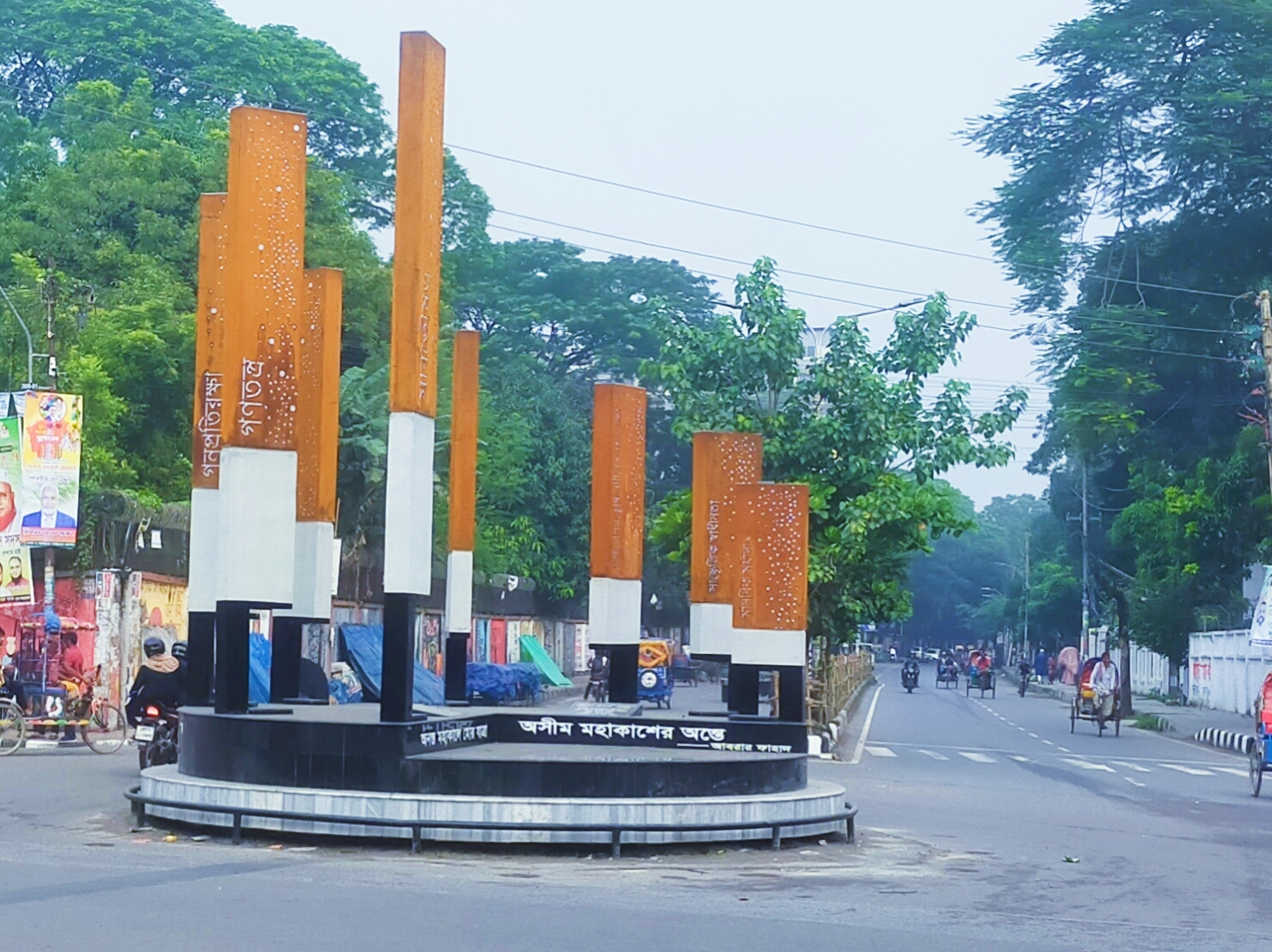
- Eight Pillars Against Aggression at Palashi intersection, Dhaka.
- Interactive map of Eight Pillars Against Aggression
- Location: Palashi Intersection, Dhaka, Bangladesh
- Coordinates: 23.72741°N 90.38957°E
- Builder: Dhaka South City Corporation
- Type: Memorial
- Material: Concrete
- Inauguration date: 7 October 2025
- Dedicated to: Abrar Fahad

The Eight Pillars Against Aggression (Bengali: আগ্রাসনবিরোধী আট স্তম্ভ) is a memorial structure located at Palashi Intersection in Dhaka, Bangladesh. The monument, consisting of eight pillars, was inaugurated on 7 October 2025 in memory of Abrar Fahad, a student of the Bangladesh University of Engineering and Technology who was killed in 2019.

== Background ==
Abrar Fahad, a second-year student of electrical and electronic engineering at BUET, was beaten to death in October 2019 by several fellow students affiliated with the Bangladesh Chhatra League. His murder sparked widespread outrage across Bangladesh.

On October 7 2020, on the occasion of Abrar's first death anniversary, a memorial was erected at the same spot by Bangladesh Chhatra Odhikar Parishad. However, within 24 hours, the Dhaka South City Corporation demolished the structure.

== Design and symbolism ==
The monument stands with eight upright pillars in a circle, each embodying a core principle that has guided the nation's journey—sovereignty, democracy, people's defense, communal harmony, economic self-reliance, protection of local resources, cultural independence, and human dignity.

== Inauguration ==
The structure was inaugurated on 7 October 2025, coinciding with the annual observance of 'Abrar Fahad Memorial Day' declared by the government of Bangladesh.

== See also ==
- Abrar Fahad
- Bangladesh University of Engineering and Technology
- Student politics of Bangladesh
