= Abdul Ahad (music director) =

Bangladeshi composer, music director and singer

- আবদুল আহাদ
- Born: 18 January 1918; Rajshahi, Bengal Presidency, British India
- Died: 14 May 1996 (aged 78)
- Occupation: Musician
- Awards: Independence Day Award (1978); Sitara-i-Imtiaz (Star of Excellence) award by the President of Pakistan in 1969; Tamgha-i-Imtiaz (Medal of Excellence) award by the Government of Pakistan in 1962

Abdul Ahad (18 January 1918 – 14 May 1996) was a Bangladeshi composer, music director and singer.

== Awards and recognition ==
- He was the recipient of Bangladesh Independence Day Award in 1978.
- The Government of Pakistan awarded him Tamgha-e-Imtiaz in 1962 and Sitara-i-Imtiaz in 1969 for his contribution to music.

== Early life ==
Abdul Ahad was born in Rajshahi in the then Bengal Presidency. He took lessons from Ustad Bali and Ustad Manju Sahib. He took part in the All-Bengal Music Competition in 1936 and stood first in the Thumri and Ghazal section. In 1938, he won a scholarship from Shantiniketan as the first Bengali Muslim student. In Santiniketan, he sang the song Diner Por Din Je Gelo and was beloved by Rabindranath Tagore.

== Career ==
After spending four years at Santiniketan, he joined His Master's Voice in Calcutta in 1941 as a music teacher. Artistes including Pankaj Mullick and Hemanta Mukherjee recorded Tagore songs under his direction. In 1941, Abdul Ahad joined His Master's Voice Calcutta and gradually became a music director for the recording industry as well as the film industry. He got success as a music director in feature films such as Duhkhe Jader Jiban Gada, Asiya (1960), Nabarun and Dur Hyay Sukh Ka Gaon.

After the 1947 Partition of India, Abdul Ahad joined Radio Pakistan in Dhaka. He introduced many new talents to the music world, composed numerous songs and wrote several books on Bengali music.

Some of his compositions include:

- Ami shagorer o neel
- Amar desher matir gondhey
- Onek brishti jhorey tumi eley
- Bhramarer pakhna jotodur jak na
