= Bhupati Bhushan Chowdhury =

Bangladeshi politician

- ভূপতিভূষণ চৌধুরী
- Born: 16 December 1930; Patiya, Chittagong, Bengal Presidency, British India
- Died: 30 June 1980 (aged 49); Kolkata, India
- Other names: Manik Chowdhury
- Awards: Independence Day Award (2018)

Bhupati Bhushan Chowdhury (also known as Manik Chowdhury; 16 December 1930 – 30 June 1980) was a Bangladesh Politician and businessman. He was awarded Independence Day Award in 2018 posthumously by the Government of Bangladesh.

== Early life ==
Chowdhury was born on 16 December 1930 in Habila Sandwip, Patiya, Chittagong, East Bengal, British Raj. He graduated from Chittagong Municipality school in 1946 and from Bangabasi College in 1947. He settled in Chittagong after the Partition of India.

== Career ==
Chowdhury joined Awami League in 1954 and campaigned for the United Front in the Election. From 1954 to 1956 he was the treasurer of Chittagong District unit of Awami League. He started a business venture with Sheikh Mujibur Rahman and M. A. Aziz, named New Agency. Majority of the profit from the new company would be used to fund Awami League. After The Daily Ittefaq was closed by the government of Pakistan, the Daily Azad started publication and was supported by Chowdhury on requests of Sheikh Mujib Rahman. He supported Fatima Jinnah in the 1964 presidential elections of Pakistan. He supported the Six point program of Awami League that called for autonomy of East Pakistan. On 20 May 1966, he was arrested under the defense act of Pakistan. On 23 January 1963 he was released from prison. He was arrested in the Agartala Conspiracy case on 9 December 1967 and released after the 1969 mass uprising in East Pakistan.

Chowdhury was arrested by the government of Yahya Khan and near 1971 was released from jail. He was with Sheikh Mujibur Rahman when he met Yahya Khan to negotiate. After the Bangladesh Liberation war started he moved to Kolkata, India. He worked as a liaison between the government of India and the Mujibnagar government. After the Independence of Bangladesh, his ties with Sheikh Mujib became strained. he left Bangladesh Awami League to join the party founded by Haji Mohammad Danesh, Jatiya Gana-mukti Union. He was arrested on 1 April 1974 and released on 25 February 1975. He established Habila Sandwip Girls High School, Habila Sandwip High School, and Hussain Shaleh-Noor College. After the Assassination of Sheikh Mujibur Rahman, he was arrested and kept in prison till 1980.

== Death ==
While he was on his way to New Delhi for medical treatment, Chowdhury died on 30 June 1980 in Kolkata.
