= Agartala Conspiracy Case =

1968 sedition case in Pakistan

- Court: Special tribunal in Dhaka Cantonment
- Full case name: State of Pakistan vs Sheikh Mujibur Rahman and others (Note: Bengali: পাকিস্তান রাষ্ট্র বনাম শেখ মুজিবুর রহমান এবং অন্যান্য, romanized: Pākistān Rāṣṭrô Banām Śēkh Mujibur Rahman ēbong Ōn'ya Urdu: پاکستان ریاست بمقابلہ شیخ مجیب الرحمان اور دیگر, romanized: Pākistān Riyasat Bimuqābila Shaykh Mujibur Rahman aur Dīgar)

Ruling
- Case withdrawn on 22 February 1969, release of all those accused.

Court membership
- Judges sitting: Justices: S. A. Rahman; M.R. Khan; Maksum-ul-Hakim

Laws applied
- Sections 121-A and 131 of the Pakistan Penal Code, waging or attempting to wage war or abetting waging of war against Pakistan.

The Agartala Conspiracy Case (Note: Bengali: আগরতলা ষড়যন্ত্র মামলা, romanized: Āgartalā Śôrôjontrô Māmlā Urdu: اجرتلا سازش کیس, romanized: Āgartalā Sāzish Kais) was a 1968 sedition case in Pakistan during the rule of Ayub Khan against the Awami League, including Sheikh Mujibur Rahman, then-leader of the Awami League in East Pakistan, and 34 other people.

The case was filed in early 1968 and implicated Sheikh Mujibur Rahman and others in conspiring with India against the stability of Pakistan. The case is officially called State vs. Sheikh Mujibur Rahman and others, but is popularly known as Agartala Shoŗojontro Mamla (Agartala conspiracy case) as the main conspiracy was purported to have taken place in the Indian city of Agartala in Tripura, where Sheikh Mujib's associates met Indian military officials.

On 22 February 2011, one of the accused of the Agartala conspiracy case, Shawkat Ali, told the parliament in Bangladesh that the Agartala conspiracy case was not false and the charges brought against the accused were all true. He also confirmed that Navy Steward Mujibur Rahman, and Educationist Mohammad Ali Reza had indeed gone to Agartala, India to seek Indian support for Bangladesh's independence.

== Accused ==
The government of Pakistan brought charges against 35 political personalities including three eminent civil servants officials under civil law. They included;

- Sheikh Mujibur Rahman
- Ahmed Fazlur Rahman CSP
- Steward Mujibur Rahman
- Commander Moazzem Hossain
- Former LS Sultanuddin Ahmad
- LSCDI Nur Mohammad
- Flight Sergeant Mahfiz Ullah
- Corporal Abdus Samad
- Former Havildar Dalil Uddin
- Ruhul Quddus CSP
- Flight Sergeant Md. Fazlul Haq
- Bibhuti Bhushan Chowdhury (alias Manik Chowdhury)
- Bidhan Krishna Sen
- Subedar Abdur Razzaque
- Former clerk Mujibur Rahman
- Former Flight Sergeant Md. Abdur Razzaque
- Sergeant Zahurul Haq
- A.B. Khurshid
- Khan Mohammad Shamsur Rahman CSP
- AKM Shamsul Haque
- Havildar Azizul Haq
- Mahfuzul Bari
- Sergeant Shamsul Haq
- Colonel Shamsul Alam
- Captain Mohammad Abdul Muttalib
- Captain Shawkat Ali
- Captain Khondkar Nazmul Huda
- Captain A. N. M. Nuruzzaman
- Sergeant Abdul Jalil
- Mahbub Uddin Chowdhury
- Lieutenant M. Rahman
- Former Subedar Tajul Islam
- Ali Reza
- Captain Khurshid Uddeen Ahmed
- Lieutenant Abdur Rauf

== Plot and detection ==
The plot was conceived by Sheikh Mujib in an attempt to ignite an armed revolution against West Pakistan that would result in the secession. Two of the accused, navy steward Mujibur Rahman and the educator Mohammad Ali Reza, went to Agartala, Tripura, a city in North-Eastern India to seek Indian support for an independent Bangladesh.

The alleged conspiracy was uncovered by Lieutenant Colonel Shamsul Alam, who commanded the East Pakistan Detachment of the Inter-Services Intelligence (ISI). It was during this time that an officer of the East Bengal Regiment, Rauf ur Rahman, who was in league with the conspirators made an attempt on Alam's life. Alam shielded himself from the would-be assassins; for this Alam was awarded the Sitara-e-Basalat, the highest award for bravery in action during peacetime.

In all, 1,500 Bengalis were arrested in connection with the plot in 1967. In January 1968 the Home Department of Pakistan declared that it had detected a scheme to destabilise Pakistan and break the Eastern wing through an armed revolt, and had arrested 8 people. Later on 18 January, the Department implicated Sheikh Mujib as well. He and others were arrested on 9 May 1968 and were subsequently released, only to be arrested later.

At the time of the trial, the existence of a conspiracy between Mujib and India for the secession of East Pakistan was never successfully proven.

== Trials ==
Pakistan decided to try the accused by court-martial since a lot of the accused were military personnel. However, this was overturned in favour of a civil trial to implicate the politicians ahead of the 1970 elections as well as to provide transparency of the trials. Hence, only 35 were finally accused. The accused were then moved from Dacca Central Jail to the secured borders of the Dacca Cantonment.

The penal codes were amended to benefit the prosecution of the accused, and the trial began on 19 June 1968 under a special tribunal. The hearings took place inside a secured chamber within the Dacca Cantonment. The hearing became for Mujib an opportunity to publicise the Awami League demands. The charge sheet of 100 paragraphs were presented before the tribunal, with 227 witnesses and 7 approvers.

The tribunal was headed by 3 judges – the chair, Justice S.A. Rahman was a non-Bengali; the other members M.R. Khan, and Maksum-ul-Hakim were Bengalis. The Pakistani government was represented by the Attorney General Tafazzal Hossain Khan and former Foreign Minister Manzur Quader. Thomas Williams, a British lawyer, along with local attorneys challenged the formation of the tribunal by filing a petition in favour of Sheikh Mujib. The approvers appeared in the witness box and testified that they provided false evidence under the coercion of the State.

Members of the public looked at the case as a conspiracy of the Pakistani government against the political autonomy movement of East Pakistan, especially since the government was keen to prove that Sheikh Mujib was an Indian agent and a separatist. They organised a mass movement and demanded the immediate withdrawal of the case and release of all prisoners. According to the government decision, the final date for the case was 6 February 1969. However, because of the mass upsurge of 1969, the government had to defer the date.

In the morning of 15 February 1969, a Pakistani havildar shot point-blank at Sergeant Zahurul Haq at the door of his jail cell and killed him. The news of the killing led a furious mob to set fire to the State Guest House and other government buildings, where the chief lawyer for the government and the chair of the tribunal resided. They vacated secretly. Some of the case files and evidence had got burnt and damaged as a result of the arson.

In the face of the mass movement, the government withdrew the Agartala Conspiracy Case on 22 February 1969. The accused were released on the following day and the Race course Maidan saw a grand reception of the accused, where Sheikh Mujib was given his famous title of Bangabandhu.

== Aftermath ==
Angry protesters formed an action committee. This popular hostility forced Ayub Khan to withdraw the case and convene a Round Table Conference which Sheikh Mujib triumphantly attended but walked out of when his Six-Point demands were ignored. The case and the resulting uprising was a major factor in the fall of Ayub Khan's government and is also seen as one of the major events leading to Bengali nationalism and the Bangladesh Liberation War.

Sergeant Zahurul Haq was honoured by the naming of a students' residential hall of the University of Dhaka after him.

== Confession ==
In 2010, and on the anniversary of the withdrawal on 22 February 2011, surviving conspirator and Deputy Speaker of the Parliament Shawkat Ali confessed to the parliament at a point of order that the charges read out to them were accurate, stating that they formed a Shangram Parishad (Action Committee) under Sheikh Mujib for the secession of East Pakistan.

Parliamentarian Tofail Ahmed added that had the case not been filed, the plot would have culminated in the secession of East Pakistan without bloodshed, and credited the Deputy Speaker with planning the liberation of the nation.
