= Abu Nayeem Md. Najib Uddin Khan =

Shaheed Freedom Fighter Abu Nayeem Md. Najibuddin Khan (Khurram) was killed in the Bangladesh Liberation War and is considered a martyr in Bangladesh. He won the Independence Day Award in 2024, the highest civilian award in Bangladesh.
