= Zahurul Haq =

Pakistani Air Force officer

- Native name: জহুরুল হক
- Born: 9 February 1935; Sudharam, Bengal, British India
- Died: 15 February 1969 (aged 34) Dacca, East Pakistan, Pakistan
- Allegiance: Pakistan
- Branch: Pakistan Air Force
- Service years: 1957 - 1969
- Rank: Senior technician
- Awards: Independence Day Award (2018)

Zahurul Haq (9 February 1935 – 15 February 1969) was a Pakistan Air Force sergeant. He was one of the 35 persons accused in the Agartala Conspiracy Case in 1969. He was killed in custody, and his death led to an increase in the 1969 uprising in East Pakistan. He received the Independence Day Award from the Government of Bangladesh in 2018.

== Early life ==
Haq was born on 9 February 1935 to a Bengali Muslim family in Sonapur, Sudharam (now Noakhali Sadar Upazila), Noakhali. He completed his matriculation from Noakhali Zilla School in 1953 and intermediate and B.Sc. in physics from Jagannath College.

== Agartala Conspiracy Case ==
Haq joined the Pakistan Air Force in 1957 as an airman and reached the rank of sergeant. He was arrested in December 1967 on accusation of a conspiracy to cause an uprising in East Pakistan with the intention of bringing about the secession of the province from the rest of Pakistan. He was confined in Dhaka Central Jail and, later, was transferred to Dhaka Cantonment in Kurmitola. In January 1968, Awami League leader Sheikh Mujibur Rahman's name was added to the case. A special tribunal was set up, headed by a West Pakistani Justice S. A. Rahman, with two other Bengali judges, Justice Mujibur Rahman Khan and Justice Maksum-ul-Hakim. Barrister Abul Khair Khan served on the legal panel in this Agartala Conspiracy Case as a lawyer for Sergeant Zahurul Haq. The final date for the case was set to 6 February 1969, and the date was deferred later. On 15 February 1969, he was shot by a Pakistani Havildar. He was taken to the Combined Military Hospital and died at around 10 pm.

== Legacy ==
Haq's death led to more street protests, and state guest house and other government buildings were burned down, which led to the withdrawal of the Agartala Conspiracy Case on 22 February 1969. "February 15 Bahini", the first armed force, was formed and consisted of student leaders.

Haq was a painter. Some of his paintings are displayed in the Bangladesh National Museum. Sergeant Zahurul Haq Hall of the University of Dhaka is named after him. BAF Zahurul Haq, a Bangladesh Air Force base, is named after him.

Haq's eldest brother, Aminul Haque (d. 1995) became the attorney general of Bangladesh.
