= Withdrawal of Feni River Water =

The Feni River is a trans-boundary river located in Bangladesh, and the water rights have been a source of dispute between India and Bangladesh. It originates in the South Tripura district and flows through Sabroom town, entering Bangladesh. A Memorandum of Understanding (MoU) has been signed between Bangladesh and India, allowing India to withdraw 1.82 cubic feet per second (cu sec) of water (equal to 51.4 litres per second) from the Feni River. These two countries have signed seven bilateral documents concerning the water disputes.

== Details ==
Bangladesh and India have signed seven bilateral documents to strengthen relations between the respective countries. The agreement was signed between the Ministry of Water Resources of Bangladesh and Ministry of Jal Shakti, India, in New Delhi. The purpose of this accord is to provide a supply of drinking water to the Sabroom Town of Tripura.

The two PMs directed a technical committee of the Joint Rivers Commission to expeditiously exchange updated data and information and prepare a draft framework for interim sharing agreements for the six rivers, namely Manu, Muhuri, Khowai, Gumti, Dharla and Dudhkumar. The committee was also directed to firm-up the draft framework of the Feni River's interim sharing agreement.

Before this agreement, India had been alleged to have illegally withdrew water from the Feni River. India set 36 low-lifting pumps in No man's land between Shilachori to Amlighat of south Tripura. BGB of Bangladesh warned India to remove the pumps, but they did not oblige. By building the pump house, India may have broken the international border law.

== Aftermath ==
Bangladesh will face some problems if India withdraws more than 1.82 cusecs of water because it may affect the Muhuri-Feni irrigation project, which utilizes the water from the Feni River. Around 230.076 hectares land area is under the Muhuri-Feni irrigation project.

The deal on the Feni river comes amid Bangladesh's frustration over refusal to sign the Teesta deal, which was scheduled to be finalized during the Indian PM at the time, Manmohan Singh’s visit to Dhaka in 2011. It was not possible due to opposition from West Bengal Chief Minister Mamata Banerjee.

Water from the Teesta is crucial for Bangladesh's northern region where farmers depend heavily on underground water for irrigation during the lean season.

== Controversy ==
After criticising the government online, Abrar Fahad (b. 13 May 1998- d. 7 Oct 2019), a second year student of electrical and electronic engineering at the department of the Bangladesh University of Engineering and Technology (BUET), was tortured and then killed by Buet's Chhatra League leaders inside Buet's Sher-e-Bangla Hall. The incident that led to this was Fahad's Facebook post, in which he expressed his critical views about Bangladesh's agreement with India to allow the withdrawal of water from the Feni River. An autopsy report confirmed that Fahad was beaten to death for at least four hours by blunt objects (cricket stumps and bamboo sticks).
