= Shah Muhammad Hasanuzzaman =

Bangladeshi agriculturalist

- Died: 10 October 2011 (aged 86); Dhaka, Bangladesh

Shah Muhammad Hasanuzzaman (died 10 October 2011) was a Bangladeshi agriculturalist. He received Independence Day Award in 1978 by the Government of Bangladesh.
