= Shaheed Abrar Fahad Avenue =

Road in Dhaka, Bangladesh

- Interactive map of Shaheed Abrar Fahad Avenue
- Former names: Jinnah Avenue (1948–1971); Bangabandhu Avenue (1972–2025)
- Namesake: Abrar Fahad
- Type: Avenue
- Location: Dhaka, Bangladesh
- Postal code: 1000
- Coordinates: 23.7266301°N 90.41208°E
- South-West end: A. H. M. Kamruzzaman Sarani
- South-East end: DIT Avenue

Shaheed Abrar Fahad Avenue (Bengali: শহীদ আবরার ফাহাদ এভিনিউ), formerly Bangabandhu Avenue and Jinnah Avenue, is an urban road situated in Gulistan, Dhaka, Bangladesh.

== History ==
Its first name was Jinnah Avenue, named after Muhammad Ali Jinnah who is the founder governor-general of Pakistan. Some year after the partition of India, a two-way road was built from this avenue to Tejgaon Airport. In the 1960s, the avenue had many popular restaurants and eateries such as Chu Chin Chow, Kasbah, La Sani, Rex, Sweet Heaven, Salimabad Hotel etc. It witnessed various historical events in the politics of East Pakistan. After the independence of Bangladesh, the avenue was renamed to Bangabandhu Avenue after Sheikh Mujibur Rahman, first president of Bangladesh. The Dhaka grenade attack of 2004 happened in the avenue. In 2018, the central office of the Bangladesh Awami League was moved at the avenue. Following the 2024 non-cooperation movement, the Awami League headquarters was vandalized. In March 2025, Bangabandhu Avenue was renamed to Shaheed Abrar Fahad Avenue, named after Abrar Fahad.
