= Nur Mohammad Mandal (social worker) =

Nur Mohammad Mandal is a Bangladeshi social worker who was awarded the Independence Award, the highest civilian state award of Bangladesh, for his contribution to population control.

Mandal completed his Licentiate in Medicine and Surgery in 1936 in the Bengal province of British India.
