= Aranya Chiran =

Bangladeshi social worker

- অরন্য চিরান
- Born: 20 December 1980 (age 45); Mymensingh
- Occupations: Teaching, Social Service
- Known for: Public Services
- Awards: Independence Award (2024)

Aranya Chiran (born 20 December 1980) is a Bangladeshi teacher, poet and social worker. He is also known for his research of Garo ethnic group. The government of Bangladesh awarded him Independence Award, the highest civilian honor, in 2024 for his special contribution to social service.

== Early life ==
Chiran was born on 20 December 1980 to Khitish Mankhin in Dighalbag village of Dhobaura Upazila of Mymensingh district. During his academic career, he received an MPhil degree in culture from Jahangirnagar University. He is also serving as the secretary general of Oikya Parishad, an indigenous organization of greater Mymensingh area.
