= Henry Bakis =

French geographer

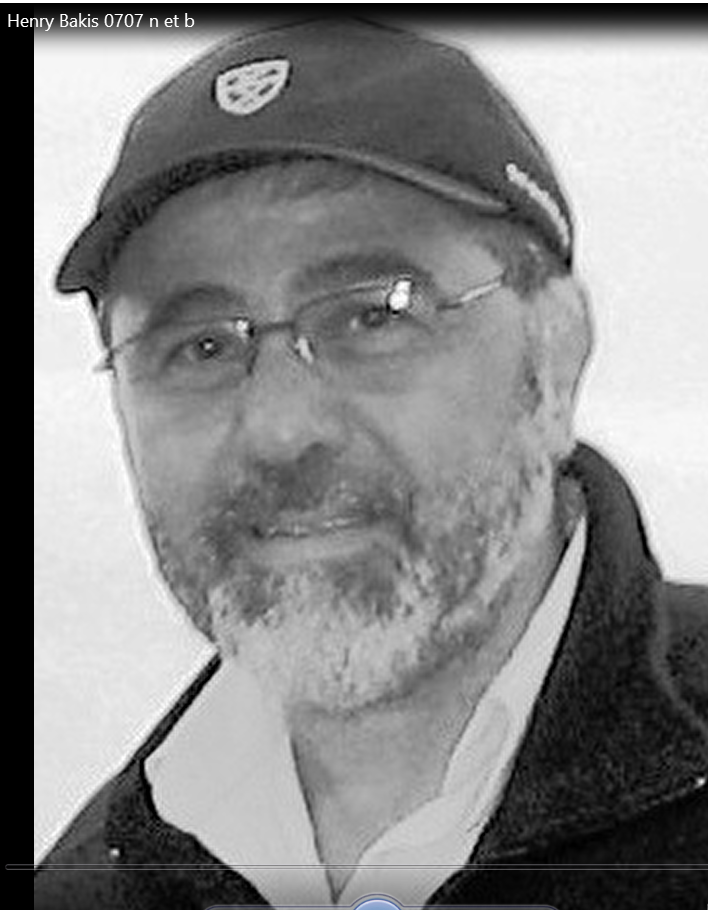

Henry Bakis (Hebrew: הנרי הלל בקיש) born in 1949, Bône (Algeria), is professor emeritus of geography at the University of Montpellier. His research has mainly focused on industry, firms and ICT geography (information and communications technologies). One of his primary interests has been considering the articulation and the effects of electronic communication networks on territories and social networks.

== Biography ==
Bakis plays an active role in the International Geographical Union commission dedicated to ICT: executive secretary, chairman or vice-chair of the commissions dedicated to ICT (1985–2016). He founded and edited the Communication Newsletter Geography (1985–2000) and the journal Netcom (1987) on communication and territories.

Bakis was a researcher at the French CNET from 1978 to 1995. He was associated research director at Paris-Sorbonne University from 1991 to 1996; and professor of economic geography at the University of Montpellier (1996–2015).

== Scope of work ==
=== Multinationals, technology and spatial organization ===
During the 1970s Bakis studied the consequences of industrial policies, industrial subcontracting and multinational firms activities in the French regions (IBM Case study). He then turned his attention to telecommunications networks of large enterprises first from the IBM case. More generally, the relationship between organizations, network technologies and geographical space are the center of his analysis. He "has contributed greatly to promote this approach of the geography, both within French geographers as within the International Geographical Union.".

=== Geography of ICT ===
Since the end of the 1970s Bakis calls for the study of telecommunications, ICT systems and digital network technologies from the geographical point of view. He "did pioneering work through important scientific production". For Bakis, telecommunications is "one of the levers of regional planning to open up the territories, improve economic performance, and allow various forms of teleactivities, a new connection between the local and the global level". He worked on the digital development of territories following the development of the Internet and digital infrastructures.

=== Spatial heterogeneity ===
The work of Bakis demonstrates that ICT does not lead to the "death of distance", or "the end of geography" in spite of the assertions of some futurologists as Richard O'Brien, Frances Cairncross, Kenichi Ohmae. ICT would minimize the importance of geographical locations, the development of networks but simultaneously leads to greater spatial heterogeneity with enhanced polarization and metropolisation. The development of infrastructure networks is closely related to demographic, social and economic pre-existing environment. Bakis dismissed the unfounded hopes of positive spatial effects. Bakis wrote that despite the development of infrastructure and communications services "space continues to be differentiated and this is one of the reasons why networks are heterogeneous".

He pleads also for the development of electro-sensitive fog free areas (implementation of the precautionary principle).

=== Geocybergeography ===
Bakis is considered as the "inventor of the concept of geocybergeography". He considers that human beings still live in a geographical classical space but this space is modified by the use of ICT. Today, it includes new attributes making it more complex. The cyberspace of electronic communication does not substitute nor overlap classical space; instead, it comes to mingle closely with the later at all scales. Bakis termed geocyberspace this contemporary form of geographic space in which are modified: the distance (apparent reduction), time (ubiquitous for some services) and costs.

=== Geopolitics of information ===
Bakis geopolitical approach to communications networks has focused on the role of technology and new technical networks in the changing cultural and political contexts for populations from recent migrations or from older diasporas, and for cultural, ethnic or religious minorities. Identities of all kind of minorities can be maintained and strengthened in the Internet age. Electronic communication networks disrupt the concepts of distance.

== Main publications ==
For a full list see Mommolin S. (2018), "Bibliography of the Publications of Professor Henry Bakis: 1972–2018", NETCOM, p. 217–252,

=== Books ===
- BAKIS H. (1977), IBM Une multinationale régionale, Presses Universitaires de Grenoble, Grenoble
- BAKIS H. (1978), La photographie aérienne et spatiale et la télédétection, Presses Universitaires de France (PUF), Que sais-je?, Paris.
- BAKIS H. et GUGLIELMO Raymond (1979), La pétrochimie dans le monde, PUF, Que sais-je?, Paris.
- BAKIS H. (1984), Géographie des télécommunications, PUF, Que sais-je?, Paris.
- BAKIS H. (1987), Géopolitique de l'information, PUF, Que sais-je?, Paris.
- BAKIS H. (1988), Entreprise, espace, télécommunication. Nouvelles technologies de l'information et organisation de l'espace économique, Paradigme, Caen, 253 p.
- BAKIS H. (Ed., 1988), Information et organisation spatiale, Paradigme, Caen, 236 p.
- BAKIS H. (Ed., 1990), Communications et territoires, La Documentation française, 404 p., Paris.
- BAKIS H. (1993), Les réseaux et leurs enjeux sociaux, PUF, Que sais-je?, Paris.
- BAKIS H., ABLER Ronald & ROCHE Edward M. (Ed., 1993), Corporates networks, international telecommunications and interdependence. Perspectives from geography and information systems, Belhaven Press (Pinter), London, 232 p.
- VLEUGEL Jaap M. (author), NIJKAMP Peter (author, editor), BAKIS Henry (contributor) (1994), Missing transport networks in Europe, Akdershot, Brookfield, Avebury, xi, 203 p : ill; 23 cm; Bibliogr.: pp. 188–203; ISBN 1-85628-674-6
- BAKIS H. et DUPUY Gabriel (Eds., 1995), 'Réseaux de communication', Annales de géographie, n° 585-586, pp. 451–621
- BAKIS H. (Editor, 1995), 'Communication and Political Geography in a Changing World', Revue Internationale de Science Politique, vol. 16, n° 3, pp. 219–311, Elsevier S. Ltd, Oxford,
- BAKIS H., HOTTES Kalheinz & WEBER Hans-Ulrich (Editors, 1995), 'Telecommunications and emerging spatial and economic organisation', Materialen zur Raumordnung, 47, Bochum, 131 p.
- BAKIS H. (1995), 'Télécommunications et quartiers défavorisés', NETCOM, vol. 9, n° H. S., 627 p.
- ROCHE Edward M. & BAKIS H. (Editors, 1997), Developments in telecommunications. Between global and local, Avebury, 350 p.
- BAKIS H. et BONIN Muriel (2000), La photographie aérienne et spatiale. PUF, Que sais-je ?, Paris.
- BAKIS H. & HUH Woo-kung (Editors, 2001), 'Geocyberspace: Building Territories on the Geographical Space of the 21st Century', Netcom, vol. 15, n° 1–2, pp. 3–153 et vol. 16 (2002), n° 1–2, pp. 3–83
- BAKIS Henry (Ed. 2001), 'Réseaux de Télécommunications. Réseaux sociaux', Bulletin de l'Association de Géographes français, Géographies, 78ème année, n° 1, pp. 1–47
- BAKIS Henry (Ed. 2005), 'Information technologies: from physical networks to digital communities', NETCOM, vol. 19, no. 1–2
- BAKIS Henry, PARADISO Maria, VIDAL Philippe (Editors 2007), 'Geocyberspace: uses and perspective', NETCOM, vol. 21, no. 3–4, pp. 281–430
- BAKIS Henry (Ed. 2011), 'New digital uses and territories', NETCOM, vol. 25, no. 1–2, pp. 1–128
- BAKIS Henry (Ed. 2012), 'Digital Territories: Case Studies', NETCOM, vol. 26, no. 3–4, pp. 145–402
- BAKIS Henry (Ed. 2013), 'The Geopolitics of Digital Space', NETCOM, vol. 27, no. 3–4, pp. 287–460

=== Translations from French ===
- BAKIS H. (1980), The communications of larger firms and their implications on the emergence of a new world industrial order. A case study: I.B.M.'s global data network, Contributing report. Meeting of the IGU Commission on Industrial Systems (26–30 August), ChuoUniversity, Tokyo, 105 p
- BAKIS H. (1982), 'Elements for a geography of telecommunication', Geographical Research Forum, n° 4, pp. 31–45, https://web.archive.org/web/20131009032918/http://www.geog.bgu.ac.il/grf/full-text/Vol4/BakisH.pdf
- BAKIS H. (1982), IBM, una multinazionale régionale, 198 p. Intr. Pasquale Coppola. Franco Angeli, Collana Geogrfia umana, Milano
- BAKIS H. (1986), 'Telecommunication and localisation of activities within firms', Chap. 2 in HOTTES Karleinz, WEVER Egbert, WEBER Hans-Ulrich (Editors), Technology and Industrial Change in Europe, Materialen, zur Raumordnung, Bochum, pp. 10–17
- BAKIS H. (1987), 'Geografia delle telecomunicazioni' pp. 8–69, in Telecomunicazioni e territorio: contributi per un analisi geografica ed economica delle reti e dei servizi di telecomunicazione, Cooperativa di cultura Lorenzo Milani
- BAKIS H. (1989), Geografia del potere: l'informazione nelle strategie internazionali, Ulisse Edizioni (Turin) et Nuova Ulisse (Bologne), 128 pp., collezione Test, ISBN 88-414-5012-6
- BAKIS H. (1991), 'Telecomunicaciones espacio y tiempo', in GOMEZ MONT Carmen (Ed.), Nuevas tecnologias de comunicacion, Editorial Trillas, Mexico, pp. 49–60
- BAKIS H. & LU Zi (2000), 'The Change from the Geographical Space to Geocyberspace. Review on the Western Scholars on Regional Effects by Telecommunications', ACTA Geographica Sinica, vol. 55, no. 1, pp. 104–111 (Chinese)

=== Journals, papers and book chapters ===
- BAKIS H. (1975), 'La sous-traitance dans l'industrie', Annales de Géographie, Paris, pp. 297–317
- BAKIS H. (1975), 'Téléinformatique et disparités régionales en France', L'Espace Géographique, n° 2, pp. 141–148
- BAKIS H. (1987), 'Telecommunications and the Global Firm', in HAMILTON F.E.I. (ed), Industrial change in advanced economies , Croom Helm, London, 1987, pp. 130–160
- BAKIS H. (1988), 'Technopole et téléport: concepts et réalités', Problèmes économiques , n° 2082, 6 juillet 1988, pp. 12–19
- BAKIS H. (1993), 'Economic and Social Geography- Toward the integration of communication networks studies', pp. 1–16 in BAKIS H., ABLER Ronald & ROCHE Edward M. (editors, 1993), Corporates networks, international telecommunications and interdependence. Perspectives from geography and information systems , Belhaven, London, 232 p.
- BAKIS H. (1996), 'L'évolution du métier de géographe et les télécommunications. Défis et opportunités pour l'Union Géographique Internationale', International Geographical Union bulletin, 46, pp. 58–62
- BAKIS H. (1996), "Cultures, électronique et territoires", Netcom , vol. 10, n° 2, pp. 640–664.
- BAKIS H., ROCHE Edward M. (1997), 'Cyberspace- The Emerging Nervous System of Global Society and its Spatial Functions', pp. 1–12, in ROCHE E. M. & BAKIS H. (Editors, 1997), Developments in telecommunications. Between global and local, Avebury (Aldershot UK, Brookfield USA, Hong Kong, Singapore, Sydney), 350 p.
- BAKIS H. et ROCHE Edward M. (1998), 'Cyberspace – The Emerging Nervous System of Global Society and its Spatial Functions', CYBERGEO , no. 59, mai, www.cybergeo.presse.fr/reseaux/texte1/bakis2.htm
- BAKIS H. et ROCHE Edward M. (2000), 'Geography, Technology and Organization', Chap. 4, in ROCHE Edward Mozley, BLAINE Michael James (Editors), Information technology in Multinational Enterprises , Coll. New Horizons in International Business, Edward Elgard Publishing Ltd., Cheltenham UK, Northampton MA USA, pp. 125–152. Bibliogr: 299-333.
- BAKIS H. (2001), 'Understanding the geocyberspace: a major task for geographers and planners in the next decade', Netcom, vol. 15, n° 1–2, pp. 9–16
- BAKIS H. (2007), 'Les nouveaux territoires de l'identité. Minorités et Internet', Netcom, vol. 21, n° 3/4, pp. 381–384, http://netcom.revues.org/2266; DOI: 10.4000/netcom.2266
- BAKIS H. (2007), 'The geocyberespace revisited: uses and perspectives', NETCOM vol. 21, n° 3–4, pp. 285–296, (PDF)
- BAKIS H. (2007), "Les nouveaux territoires de l'identité. Minorités et Internet", Note de recherche, Netcom, vol. 21, n°3–4, pp. 381–384.
- BAKIS H., VIDAL Philippe (2010), 'Geography of the Information Society', Ch. 5, pp. 71–87, in REBER Bernard & BROSSAUD Claire (eds.), 'Digital Cognitive Technologies. Epistemology and Knowledge Society, ISTE /Wiley
- BAKIS H. (2013), 'Fragilité du géocyberespace à l'heure des conflits cybernétiques', Netcom , vol. 27, n° 3/4, pp. 293–308, https://netcom.revues.org/1438
- BAKIS H. (2016), 'Pour l'aménagement d'espaces sans brouillard électromagnétique', in Paché Gilles, El Khayat Mustapha (2016), Invitation aux flux. Entre transport et espace, Coll. Travail et Gouvernance, Presses Universitaire de Provence, ISBN 9791032000397, pp. 143–150.

=== Video ===
- BAKIS H. (2010), 'TIC et Développement numérique des territoires'. Conférence d'ouverture des Journées DigiPolis. Territoires numériques intelligents, Montbéliard, 26 mai. (vidéo 30 minutes) http://www.digipolis.fr/2010/digipolis/digipolis-tv/seancedouverture.html

=== Other ===
- Mommolin Sabrina (2018), "Bibliographie thématique des publications du Professeur Henry Bakis: 1972–2018" / "Bibliography of the Publications of Professor Henry Bakis: 1972–2018", NETCOM, https://journals.openedition.org/netcom/3066
