= Mollah Obayedullah Baki =

Bangladeshi doctor

Mollah Obaydullah Baki is a valiant freedom fighter and Bangladeshi doctor who won the Independence Award in 2024 for his contribution to the field of medicine. He served as director of National Institute of Cancer Research and Hospital.
