= M. A. Aziz =

Bangladeshi politician (1921–1971)

- এম. এ আজিজ
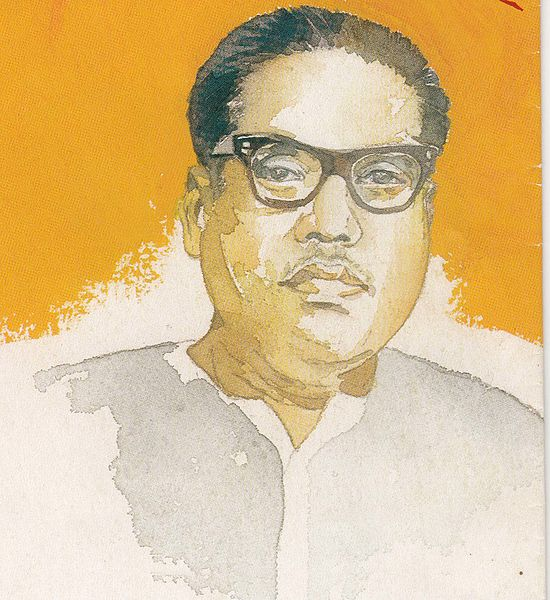

Member of the National Assembly (M.N.A)
- Succeeded by: M.A Majid

Personal details
- Born: 1921; Halishahar, Bengal Presidency, British India
- Died: 11 January 1971 (aged 49–50)
- Political party: Bangladesh Awami League

M. A. Aziz (1921 - 11 January 1971) was an Awami League politician and the former Member of the National Assembly of Pakistan from Kotwali-Double Mooring, Chittagong. He was also a good friend and an advisor of Sheikh Mujib.

== Early life ==
Aziz was born in 1921 in Halishahar, Bengal Presidency, British India. In 1940 he graduated from Pahartali Railway High School and then completed his IA in 1942 from Chittagong College. He was expelled from the college due to his activities with the All Bengal Muslim Students league. After which he joined the Awami Muslim League.

== Career ==
Aziz was the first general secretary of Chittagong District. He was involved in the Bengali Language Movement and worked as the joint convener "Sarba Daliya Rashtra Bhasha Sangram Committee". He was arrested for his involvement. In 1953 he was elected to the central committee of Awami League. In 1954 he was arrested. In 1958 he was arrested again after Martial law was declared. In the 1960s, he started a business with Sheikh Mujibur Rahman and Bhupati Bhushan Chowdhury named New Agency. The majority of the profits were to be used to finance Awami League.

Aziz played an important role in the Six point program led by Sheikh Mujibur Rahman. On 8 May 1966 he was arrested for his role in the program. On 18 July 1970 he was arrested for protesting martial law. In 1970 general elections he was elected to the National Assembly of Pakistan, from Kotwali-Double Mooring constituency as a candidate of Awami League.

== Death ==
Aziz died on 11 January 1971. M. A. Aziz Stadium in Chittagong was named after him.
