= Selim Baki =

Algerian writer (born 1971)

- Born: Algeria
- Awards: Grand Prix du roman

Selim Baki (born 1971) (Arabic:سليم باكي), Algerian writer and author, was born in Algeria and grew up in Annaba, northeastern Algeria. Selim Baki returned to Paris to study literature in 1997, after spending a year in Paris in 1995. Now he works and lives in Paris, he retired to the French Academy in Rome in 2005.

== Biography ==
Selim Baki studied literature at the Sorbonne University in Paris in 1997, and wrote his first novel, "Ulysses' Dog" in 2001, which was well received by critics and won the "Grand Prix du roman" awards for French literature. He retired from the French Academy in Rome in 2005 and now works and lives in Paris. He became the most talented writer in Algeria, writing about Algeria's history of wars and colonialism. His first two novels were part of a series of novels based on a fictional city called "Cirtha" (Arabic: sirtha). After spending a year in Rome, his third novel, "Kill Them All" (Arabic: aiqtulhum jamiean), was a turning point in his approach to choosing deep and painful themes, talking about terror and murder. His novel "Muhammad's silence" (Arabic: skut muhamad), was published in September 2008 and was selected for three "Grand Prix du roman" awards. Selim Baki traveled throughout Europe and Morocco to change the public's perception of literature, giving lectures to students, readers, and universities. He retired from the French Academy in Rome in 2005 and now works and lives in Paris. Gallimard publishing house published 5 of his novels that were accepted by critics, and Selim Baki published a collection of short stories entitled "Bad Life" in Algeria, which won two "Grand Prix du roman" awards and a "Prince Pierre" scholarship.

== Author's books ==
- Ulysses' Dog, Gallimard Publishing, 2001.
- The Priestess (Arabic: Al-Kahina), Gallimard Publishing House, 2003.
- Self-portrait with Granada (Arabic: burtirih dhati mae ghirnata), 2005.
- Kill Them All (Arabic: aiqtulhum jamiean), Gallimard Publishing, 2006.
- The 12 Midnight Tales (Arabic: al12 hikayat muntasaf allayl), Gallimard Publishing, 2006.
- Muhammad's silence (Arabic: skut muhamad), Gallimard Publishing, 2008.
- The Adventures of Sinbad and the Seas (Arabic: mughamarat sindibad walbihaar), Gallimard Publishing, 2010.
- I'm khaled Kalkal (Arabic: ana, khalid kilkal), 2012.
- Last summer of a young man (Arabic: alsayf almadi lishabin), 2013.
- The Consul (Arabic: alqunsul), Gallimard Publishing, 2014.

== Awards ==
- "Grand Prix du roman" awards for Literary Profession, 2001.
- "Grand Prix du roman"awards for Literary Profession, 2008.
