= Khan Shamsur Rahman =

Bangladeshi diplomat

- খান শামসুর রহমান

Ambassador of Bangladesh to Italy
- In office 24 October 1978 – April 1980
- Preceded by: Fakhruddin Ahmed
- Succeeded by: Abul Ahsan

High Commissioner of Bangladesh to India
- In office 7 August 1975 – 16 October 1978
- Preceded by: A R Mallick
- Succeeded by: Abul Ehsan

Ambassador of Bangladesh to the Soviet Union
- In office 17 February 1972 – 4 August 1975
- Preceded by: Position created
- Succeeded by: Shamsul Hoq

Personal details
- Died: 25 October 2010 (aged 84)
- Education: University of Dhaka

Khan Shamsur Rahman, also known as Khan Mohammad Shamsur Rahman, was a Bangladeshi diplomat and the first ambassador of Bangladesh to the Soviet Union. He was the High Commissioner of Bangladesh to India.

== Career ==
Rahman came first in the Central Superior Services examinations of 1951.

In the 1960s, Rahman was stationed in the Pakistan Embassy in Indonesia.

Rahman was an accused in the Agartala Conspiracy Case in 1968 that accused a number of Bengalis of working with India for the succession of East Pakistan. His defence lawyer was his older brother Ataur Rahman Khan who was the former Chief Minister of East Pakistan. He was one of three civil service officers charged in the Agartala case.

After the Independence of Bangladesh in 1971, Rahman was appointed by Sheikh Mujibur Rahman as the first ambassador of Bangladesh to the Soviet Union. On 10 January 1972, he received Prime Minister Sheikh Mujibur Rahman at the airport when he returned to Independent Bangladesh from prison in Pakistan. He served from 17 February 1972 to 4 August 1975 and was replaced by Shamsul Hoq. Rahman was posted High Commissioner of Bangladesh to India. He presented his credentials to President of India Fakhruddin Ali Ahmed on 1 August.

== Death ==
Rahman died in 25th October 2010 at the age of 84.
