= Mohammad Abdul Baki =

Bangladeshi civil servant (b. 1950)

- Born: 30 January 1950 (age 76)
- Education: Bangladesh Agricultural University
- Awards: Independence Award, 2026
- Scientific career
- Fields: Agricultural engineer, Researcher, Teacher and former civil servant

Mohammad Abdul Baki (born 30 January 1950) is a Bangladeshi agricultural engineer, researcher, teacher and former civil servant. He is known for his contributions to agricultural mechanization, research and training in Bangladesh. In 2026, he awarded the highest civilian honor award, Independence Award, in recognition of his contribution to Research and training.

== Early life and education ==
He was born on 30 January 1950 in Thakurgaon District. He completed his basic science studies at Bangladesh Agricultural University and later earned a graduate degree in agricultural engineering from the same university. He obtained a master's degree from the University of the Philippines Los Baños, a PhD from Central Luzon State University, and completed a post-doctoral fellowship at the University of Greenwich.

== Career ==
From 1976 to 2007, Abdul Baki served in several important academic, scientific, and administrative positions in Bangladesh. He worked in agricultural research and development and later became Director General of the Bangladesh Rice Research Institute. He was also involved in teaching and scientific training during his professional career.

Dr. Baki is noted for his work in developing farmer-friendly agricultural machinery in Bangladesh. He played an important role in the invention and development of several machines, including: BRRI diaphragm pump, Power thresher, BRRI rice-wheat reaper and BRRI power winnower. These technologies helped reduce labor requirements, save time, and lower post-harvest losses for farmers. His research papers have been published in both domestic and international journals.

== Awards and honours ==
- Independence Award, 2026
