= Shamsul Alam (army officer) =

Bangladeshi army officer

- শামসুল আলম
- Military career
- Allegiance: Bangladesh; Pakistan (before 1971)
- Branch: Bangladesh Army; Pakistan Army
- Service years: 1959–1976
- Rank: Colonel
- Unit: Army Medical Corps
- Commands: Assistant Director General of Medical Services (Western Sector)
- Conflicts: Bangladesh Liberation War

Shamsul Alam was a Bangladesh Army officer and veteran of the Bangladesh Liberation War. He was awarded the Independence Award, the highest civilian award of Bangladesh, posthumously in 2023 for his contribution to the Bangladesh Liberation War by Prime Minister Sheikh Hasina. He was an accused in the Agartala Conspiracy Case. He served as the director general of medical services of the Bangladesh Army after the war.

== Early life and education ==
Alam completed his matriculation from Armanitola Government High School in 1948. He completed his Intermediate of Science from Dhaka College in 1950. He completed his M.B.B.S. from Dhaka Medical College in 1957.

== Military career ==
He joined the Pakistan Army Medical Corps as a captain in 1959. He completed his military training in Abbottabad and professional training in Karachi. His first posting was in Rawalpindi Medical College Hospital. In 1962-63 he served as the medical officer of a commando battalion in Peshawar. In 1964 he was posted in Dhaka. In late 1965 he was appointed as the medical recruiting officer and was posted to Comilla Cantonment. In 1967 he was sent to Rawalpindi for a training course. In 1967 he was promoted to the rank of major. He was one of the accused in the Agartala Conspiracy Case. He was later dismissed from the army after the withdrawal of the Agartala Conspiracy Case.

=== Liberation War of Bangladesh ===
He joined the liberation war in August 1971. He fought under sector 2. Later he was appointed as the assistant director general of medical services (Western Sector). He served in BDF HQ.

=== Bangladesh Army ===
After the independence of Bangladesh he rejoined the army. He reached the rank of colonel. He retired from the army in April 1976.
