= Independence Award =

Highest civilian award in Bangladesh

Independence Award স্বাধীনতা পদক
- Type: National Civilian
- Country: Bangladesh
- Presented by: Government of Bangladesh
- Ribbon
- Established: 1976
- First award: 1977
- Final award: 2026

Precedence
- Next (lower): Ekushey Padak

The Independence Award (Bengali: স্বাধীনতা পদক romanized: Swadhinata Padak, lit. "Sovereignty Medal"), (Note: Bengali: স্বাধীনতা পুরস্কার, romanized: Sbadhinôta Purôskar, pronounced [ˈʃadʱiˌnɔtaˑ ˈpuɾoʃˌkaɾ]) formally known as the Independence Day Award or the Independence Medal, (Note: Bengali: স্বাধীনতা পদক, romanized: Sbadhinôta Pôdôk, pronounced [ˈʃadʱiˌnɔtaˑ ˈpɔdok]) is the highest state award given by the government of Bangladesh. Introduced in 1977, this award is bestowed upon Bangladeshi citizens or organizations in recognition of substantial contributions to one of many fields, including the War of Liberation, the Language Movement, education, literature, journalism, public service, science and technology, medical science, social science, song, games and sports, fine arts, rural development, and other areas.

Each awardee receives a gold medal, a certificate of honour, and 500,000 Bangladeshi takas (US$4109). A cabinet committee on national awards prepares the list of each year's nominees and forwards the list to the head of the government for final approval. The award is traditionally presented on the eve of Independence Day in Bangladesh at a much publicized ceremony attended by several cabinet and parliament members and distinguished society guests.

In 2006, the award generated some controversy as the initial list was not accepted by the Prime Minister, some government ministers had expressed concern over the nomination of three fellow ministers. Furthermore, the award to the Rapid Action Battalion was criticized by many because of RAB's alleged involvement in extrajudicial killings.

== Awards by decade ==
- List of Independence Day Award recipients (1977–1979)
- List of Independence Day Award recipients (1980–1989)
- List of Independence Day Award recipients (1990–1999)
- List of Independence Day Award recipients (2000–2009)
- List of Independence Day Award recipients (2010–2019)
- List of Independence Day Award recipients (2020–2029)
