= 2020 in Bangladesh =

- Centuries: 20th; 21st
- Decades: 2000s; 2010s; 2020s
- See also: Other events of 2020; List of years in Bangladesh

2020 (MMXX) was a leap year starting on Wednesday of the Gregorian calendar, the 2020th year of the Common Era (CE) and Anno Domini (AD) designations, the 20th year of the 3rd millennium and the 21st century, and the 1st year of the 2020s decade.

The year 2020 was the 49th year after the independence of Bangladesh. It is also the second year of the fourth term of the government of Sheikh Hasina. This year the entire country celebrated the 100th birthday of its Father of the Nation Bangabandhu Sheikh Mujibur Rahman. The period between 17 March 2020 and 17 March 2021 was announced as the 'Mujib Borsho (মুজিববর্ষ)' or the year of Mujib. However, like rest of the world Bangladesh was also severely impacted by COVID-19 pandemic.

== Incumbents ==
President	Prime Minister	Speaker	Chief Justice	Opposition Leader	Cabinet Secretary
Mohammad Abdul Hamid (Age 78)	Sheikh Hasina Wazed (Age 75)	Shirin Sharmin Chaudhury (Age 56)	Syed Mahmud Hossain (Age 68)	Rowshan Ershad (Age 79)	Khandker Anwarul Islam
Bangladesh Awami League (Since 14 March 2013)	Bangladesh Awami League (Since 6 January 2009)	Bangladesh Awami League (Since 1 May 2013)	Independent (Since 2 February 2018)	Jatiyo Party-E (Since 9 September 2019)	Independent (Since 28 October 2019)

== Demography ==
Demographic Indicators for Bangladesh in 2020
Population, total	164,689,383
Population density (per km^{2})	1,265.2
Population growth (annual %)	1.1%
Male to Female Ratio (every 100 Female)	102.5
Urban population (% of total)	36.6%
Birth rate, crude (per 1,000 people)	Not available
Death rate, crude (per 1,000 people)	Not available
Mortality rate, under 5 (per 1,000 live births)	30.2
Life expectancy at birth, total (years)	71.5
Fertility rate, total (births per woman)	Not available

== Economy ==
Key Economic Indicators for Bangladesh in 2020
National Income
	Current US$	Current BDT	% of GDP
GDP	$324.2 billion	BDT27.5 trillion	
GDP growth (annual %)	2.4%		
GDP per capita	$1,968.8	BDT166,757	
Agriculture, value added	$41.0 billion	BDT3.5 trillion	12.6%
Industry, value added	$93.3 billion	BDT7.9 trillion	28.8%
Services, etc., value added	$177.1 billion	BDT15.0 trillion	54.6%
Balance of Payment
	Current US$	Current BDT	% of GDP
Current account balance	$1.1 billion		.3%
Imports of goods and services	$57.3 billion	BDT5.1 trillion	18.6%
Exports of goods and services	$38,776.5 million	BDT3.3 trillion	12.2%
Foreign direct investment, net inflows	NA		0.0%
Personal remittances, received	$21,749.7 million		6.7%
Total reserves (includes gold) at year end	$43,171.7 million		
Total reserves in months of imports	8.6		

Note: For the year 2020 average official exchange rate for BDT was 84.87 per US$.

== Events ==
=== January ===
- 27 January – Supporters of the political parties Bangladesh Awami League and Bangladesh Nationalist Party clash during the Dhaka South City Corporation election campaign in the Gopibagh yesterday area. At least 15 people injured.
- 29 January – Algeria reopens its embassy in Dhaka, after closing it in 1990. (New Age)

=== February ===
- 9 February – Bangladesh wins the 2020 Under-19 Cricket World Cup by defeating the defending champions India in the final.
- 11 February – Fifteen Rohingya refugees died, and another 72 were rescued, when a trawler bound for Malaysia sank off of St. Martin's Island in the Bay of Bengal, leading to police to file charges against 19 alleged brokers.

=== March ===
- 8 March – The first three cases of COVID-19 are reported in the country beginning the 2020 coronavirus pandemic in Bangladesh.
- 17 March – The 100th birth anniversary of the father of the nation Bangabandhu Sheikh Mujibur Rahman is celebrated throughout the country.

=== April ===
- 18 April – Hundreds of garment workers march in Chittagong, Bangladesh, demanding factory owners pay them last month's wages following delays. (Reuters)
- 20 April – The country's first Blockchain Olympiad Bangladesh is organised.
- 27 April – Over 500 garment factories in Dhaka and Chittagong re-opened, after being shut down for a month to stop the spread of coronavirus.

=== May ===
- 5 May – Eleven people, including cartoonist Ahmed Kabir Kishore and writer Mushtaq Ahmed, were arrested by the Rapid Action Battalion after posting criticisms of the government's handling of the COVID-19 pandemic.
- 20 May – Cyclone Amphan hits Bangladesh's coastal areas. The cyclone killed dozens and destroyed many homes.
- 27 May – A fire at a hospital kills five patients being treated for COVID-19 in Dhaka, Bangladesh. No cause for the fire has been determined. (Reuters)

=== June ===
- 29 June – At least 34 people die when MV Morning Bird launch collides with another vessel and sinks in the Buriganga River in capital Dhaka.

=== August ===
- 10 August – The assassination of retired army officer Major (rtd) Sinha Md Rashed Khan by some disgraced members of the police force caused tensions between the Bangladesh Army and the Bangladesh Police which was cooled off by assurance from the government that justice will prevail. OC Pradeep, Inspector Liakat, and SI Nanda Dulal the three policemen involved were all arrested by the elite RAB. The mastermind OC Pradeep had also been found linked to numerous corruption scandals and accumulation of illegal wealth through extortion.
- 15 August – Two lighter vessels capsize in the Bay of Bengal, near the island of Bhasan Char in Bangladesh. The country's Inland Water Transport Authority report that 13 crew members from one vessel en route to the Narayanganj District from Chittagong are missing, while all 12 crew members from the other vessel were rescued. (Anadolu Agency)

=== September ===
- 6 September – Twenty-four people died after a leak in a gas pipeline caused an explosion in a mosque in Narayanganj district. Several others were injured.
- 19 September – The border guards of Bangladesh and India agree to launch joint patrols along the two countries' border following a spate of deaths linked to illegal entries. (Anadolu)

=== October ===
- 15 October – A court in Bangladesh sentences five men to death for the gang rape of a girl in 2012. The verdict comes amidst public outcry regarding growing sexual violence. It was the first conviction since the government this week introduced the death penalty for rape. (Al Jazeera)
- 20 October – The reactor of the first unit of the Rooppur Nuclear Power Plant (RNPP) was transferred to Bangladesh from Russia, initiating the Rooppur Nuclear Power Plant, which is expected to be in operation by 2023.

=== December ===
- 4 December – Despite international pressure to back down, Bangladesh begins transferring thousands of Rohingya refugees to the remote island of Bhasan Char in the Bay of Bengal. Bangladesh says all the refugees being moved have given consent and that the relocation was voluntary.
- 8 December and 9 December – For two days traders clashed with the police when Dhaka South City Corporation began demolition of hundreds of unauthorized shops of a market in Gulistan's Fulbaria area. Traders demanded compensation. The eviction drive that begun on 8 December continued for a second consecutive day on 9 December with continued clashes.

=== Awards and recognitions ===
==== Independence Day Award ====
Total 9 persons and 1 organisation were awarded.

Recipients	Area	Note
Golam Dastagir Gazi	independence and liberation war	
Azizur Rahman	independence and liberation war	
Commander Abdur Rauf	independence and liberation war	posthumous
Anwar Pasha	independence and liberation war	posthumous
Kalipada Das	culture	
Ferdousi Mazumder	culture	
Professor Dr Md Obaidul Kabir Chowdhury	medical science	
AKMA Muqtadir	medical science	
Bharateswari Homes	education	

==== Ekushey Padak ====
Ekushey Padak was awarded to 20 people and 1 organisation.

1. Aminul Islam Badsha, language movement (posthumous)
2. Begum Dalia Nausheen, music
3. Shankar Roy, music
4. Mita Haque, music
5. Golam Mostafa Khan, dance
6. SM Mohsin, acting
7. Farida Zaman, art
8. Haji Aktar Sardar, liberation war (posthumous)
9. AAM Mesbahul Haque, liberation war
10. Abdul Jabbar, liberation war (posthumous)
11. Zafar Wazed, journalism
12. Jahangir Alam Khan, research
13. Syed Mohammad Saifur Rahman, research
14. Bikiran Prasad Barua, education
15. Shamsul Alam, economics
16. Sufi Mohammed Mizanur Rahman, social welfare
17. Nuran Nabi, language and literature
18. Sikder Aminul Haq, language and literature (posthumous)
19. Nazmun Nesa Peyari, language and literature
20. Sayeba Akhter, medicine
21. Bangladesh Fisheries Research Institute, research

== Deaths ==
=== January ===
- 2 January - Fazilatunnesa Bappy, lawyer and former member of Jatiya Sangsad (b.1970)
- 10 January - Mozammel Hossain, politician and former member of Jatiya Sangsad. (b.1940)
- 11 January -
  - Musharraf Karim, writer, journalist and former fellow of Bangla Academy. (b.1946)
  - Ahmed Ali, activist, freedom fighter, politician and lawyer. (b.1932)
- 14 January - Kazi Sekendar Ali Dalim, politician and former member of Jatiya Sangsad. (b.1945)
- 16 January - Jibon Rahman, film director. (b.1964)
- 18 January -
  - Abdul Mannan, politician and former member of Jatiya Sangsad. (b.1953)
  - Abbas Ullah Shikder, film producer, actor and politician. (b.1955)
- 21 January - Ismat Ara Sadique, politician, former minister and former member of Jatiya Sangsad. (b.1941)
- 31 January - Wazi Uddin Khan, freedom fighter, politician and former member of Jatiya Sangsad. (b.1936)

=== February ===
- 3 February - Durul Huda, politician, former mayor of Rajshahi City Corporation and former member of Jatiya Sangsad.(b.1955)
- 16 February - Md. Rahamat Ali, politician, former state minister and former member of Jatiya Sangsad. (b.1945)

=== March ===
- 19 March - Ashraf Siddiqui, poet, folklorist, essayist and former director general of Bangla Academy. (b.1927)

=== April ===
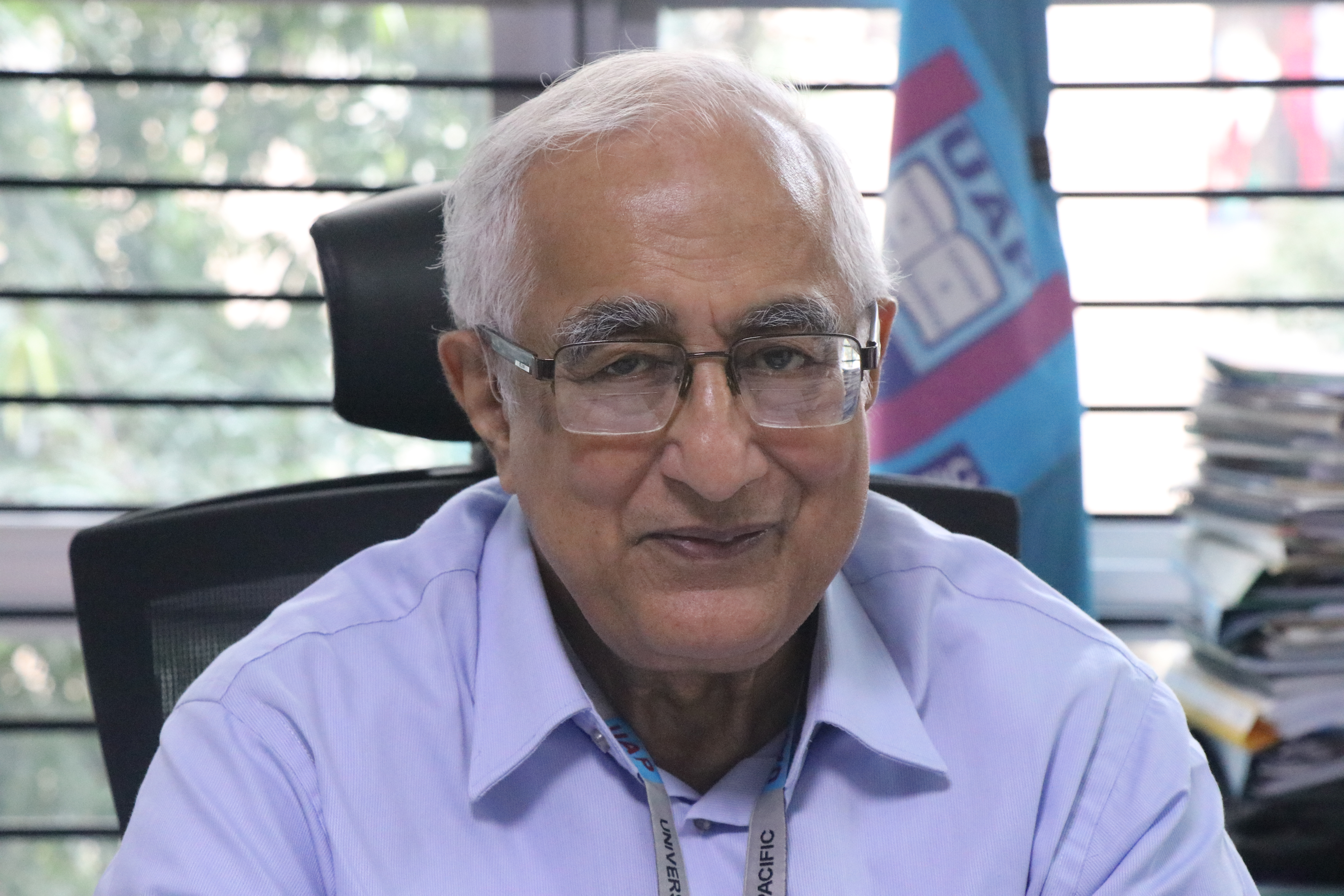
Jamilur Reza Chowdhury in 2018

- 12 April - Abdul Majed, convicted Army officer, executed.
- 28 April - Jamilur Reza Chowdhury, civil engineer and National Professor. (b.1942)

=== May ===
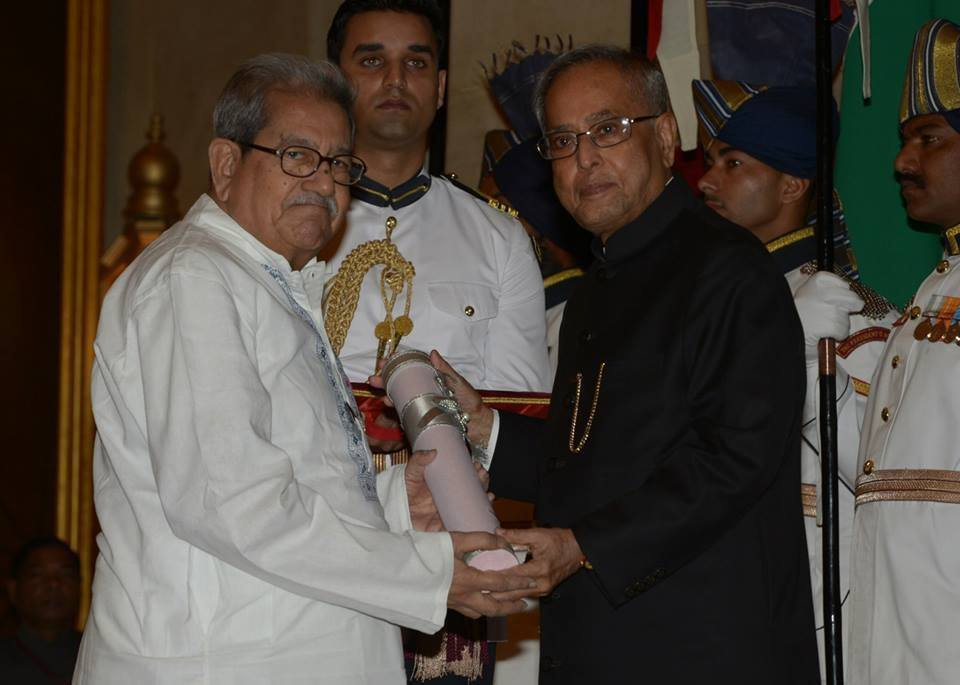
Anisuzzaman receiving Padma Bhushan from Indian President Pranab Mukherjee in 2014

- 6 May - Habibur Rahman Mollah, politician and former member of Jatiya Sansad. (b.1942)
- 8 May - Shamsuddin Ahmed (engineer), politician and former member of Jatiya Sansad.
- 10 May - Anwarul Kabir Talukdar, former state minister and former member of Jatiya Sangsad. (b.1944)
- 14 May - Anisuzzaman, Bangladeshi activist, educationist and National Professor. (b.1937)
- 16 May - Azad Rahman, Bangladeshi composer.
- 26 May - Nurul Islam Manzoor, former state minister and former member of Jatiya Sangsad.
- 29 May - Abdullah al Mohsin Chowdhury, Bangladeshi civil servant and defence secretary.(b.1963)
- 30 May - Golam Rabbani Helal, footballer. (b.1957).
- 31 May - Abdul Monem, Bangladesh Industrialist and entrepreneur.

=== June ===
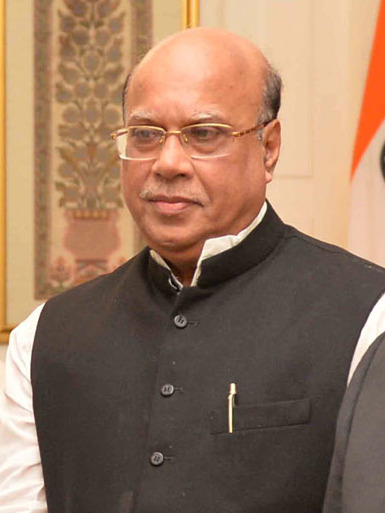
Mohammed Nasim in Rashtrapati Bhavan, New Delhi in 2016.

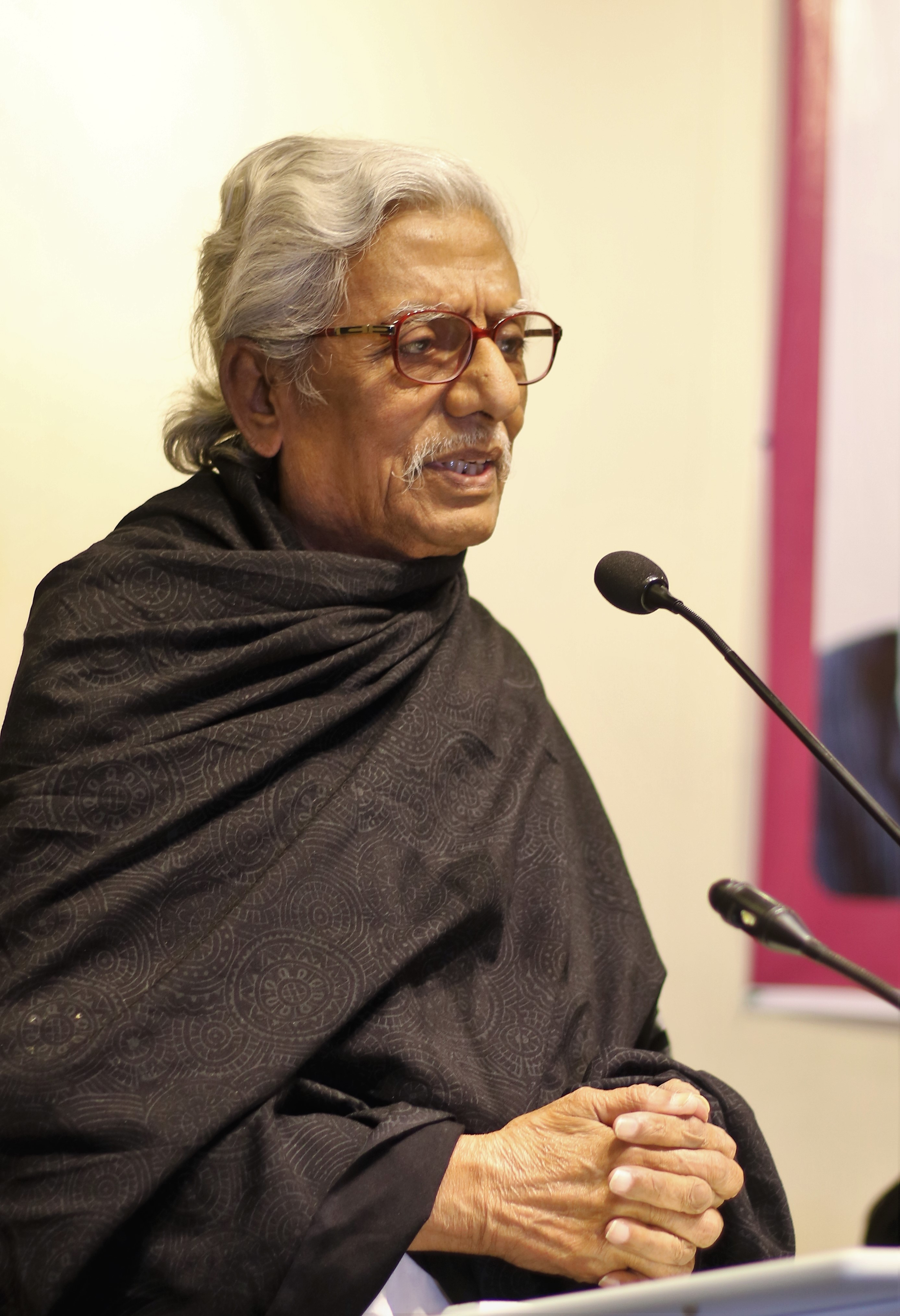
Kamal Lohani in 'Lok' Literature Award ceremony in 2017.

- 13 June -
  - Mohammed Nasim, freedom fighter, presidium member of Awami League, former minister and former member of Jatiya Sansad. (b.1948)
  - Sheikh Muhammad Abdullah, freedom fighter, former state minister and former member of Jatiya Sangsad. (b.1945)
- 14 June - Nurul Haque Manik, footballer. (b.1960s)
- 15 June - Badar Uddin Ahmed Kamran, politician and first mayor of Sylhet City Corporation. (b.1951)
- 16 June - Azad Rahman, composer and musician. (b.1944)
- 19 June - Ramchand Goala, cricketer and coach. (b.1940)
- 20 June - Kamal Lohani, journalist, activist and former director general of Shilpakala Academy. (b.1934)

=== July ===
- 1 July - Latifur Rahman, business magnate and media mogul, founder and former CEO of Transcom Group (b.1945)
- 3 July -
  - Faruk Quazi, journalist and law reporter (b.1949)
  - Wahidul Haq, former finance minister of Bangladesh
- 6 July - Andrew Kishore, musician and playback singer (b.1955)
- 9 July - Sahara Khatun, Awami League politician, former member of Jatiya Sangsad, and first woman home minister of Bangladesh (b.1943)
- 13 July - Nurul Islam Babul, business magnate, industrialist, entrepreneur and former chairman of Jamuna Group (b.1946)
- 14 July - Shajahan Siraj, former minister and former member of Jatiya Sangsad (b.1943)
- 15 July - Sayed Haider, physician, Language Movement activist and co-designer of the first Shaheed Minar (b.1925)
- 16 July -
  - Muhammad Mohaiminul Islam, former chief of naval staff (b.1941)
  - Emajuddin Ahamed, political scientist and former vice-chancellor of the University of Dhaka(b.1933)
- 24 July - Delwar Hossain, Awami League politician, former member of Jatiya Sangsad
- 27 July -
  - Israfil Alam, Awami League politician, member of Jatiya Sangsad
  - AKM Amanul Islam Chowdhury, caretaker government adviser
- 29 July - Sheikh Md. Nurul Haque, Awami League politician, member of Jatiya Sangsad

=== August ===
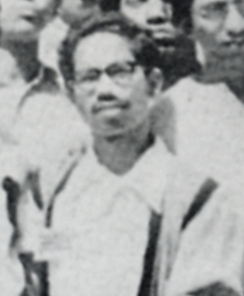
Murtaja Baseer in Dhaka University in 1954.

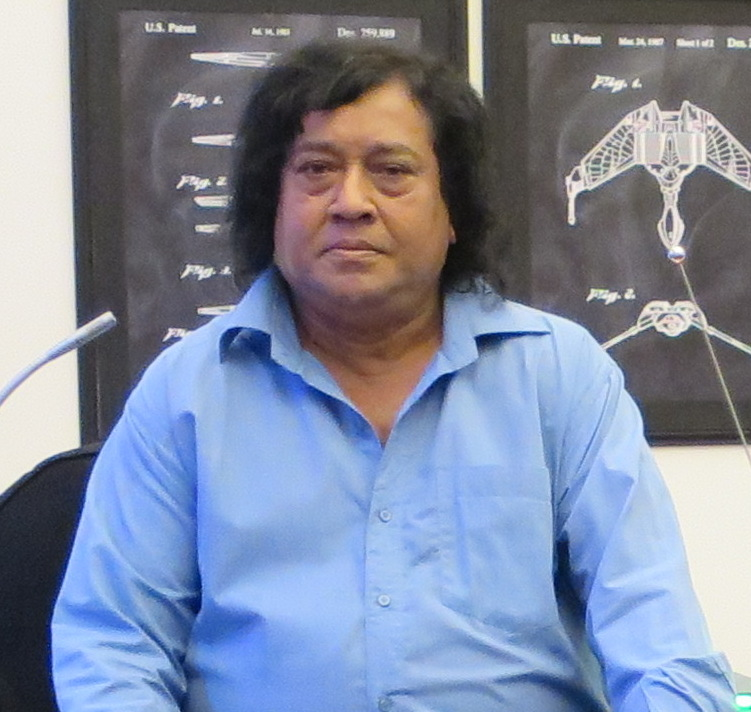
Mrinal Haque at the US Embassy in Dhaka in 2018

- 3 August -
  - ATM Alamgir, Bangladesh Nationalist Party politician and former member of Jatiya Sangsad.
  - Mohammad Barkatullah, 76, Bangladeshi television producer, COVID-19.
- 4 August - Abdul Mannan, Bangladeshi politician, Minister of Civil Aviation and Tourism (1991–1996).
- 9 August - Alauddin Ali, Bangladeshi composer (Golapi Ekhon Traine, Sundori, Koshai), lung complications.
- 15 August - Murtaja Baseer, Bangladeshi painter, COVID-19.
- 18 August -
  - Sayeeda Khanam, was the first female professional photographer of Bangladesh.
  - M. A. Jabbar, Jatiya Party politician and a Jatiya Sangsad (1986–1990).
  - Azizur Rahman, Awami League politician, member of Jatiya Sangsad.
- 22 August - Mrinal Haque, Bangladeshi sculptor.
- 24 August - Chitta Ranjan Dutta, Bangladeshi military officer, Director General of the Bangladesh Rifles (1971–1974).
- 27 August - Sunil Dhar, Bangladeshi classical musician, heart failure.
- 28 August - Rahat Khan, Bangladeshi journalist and novelist.

=== September ===
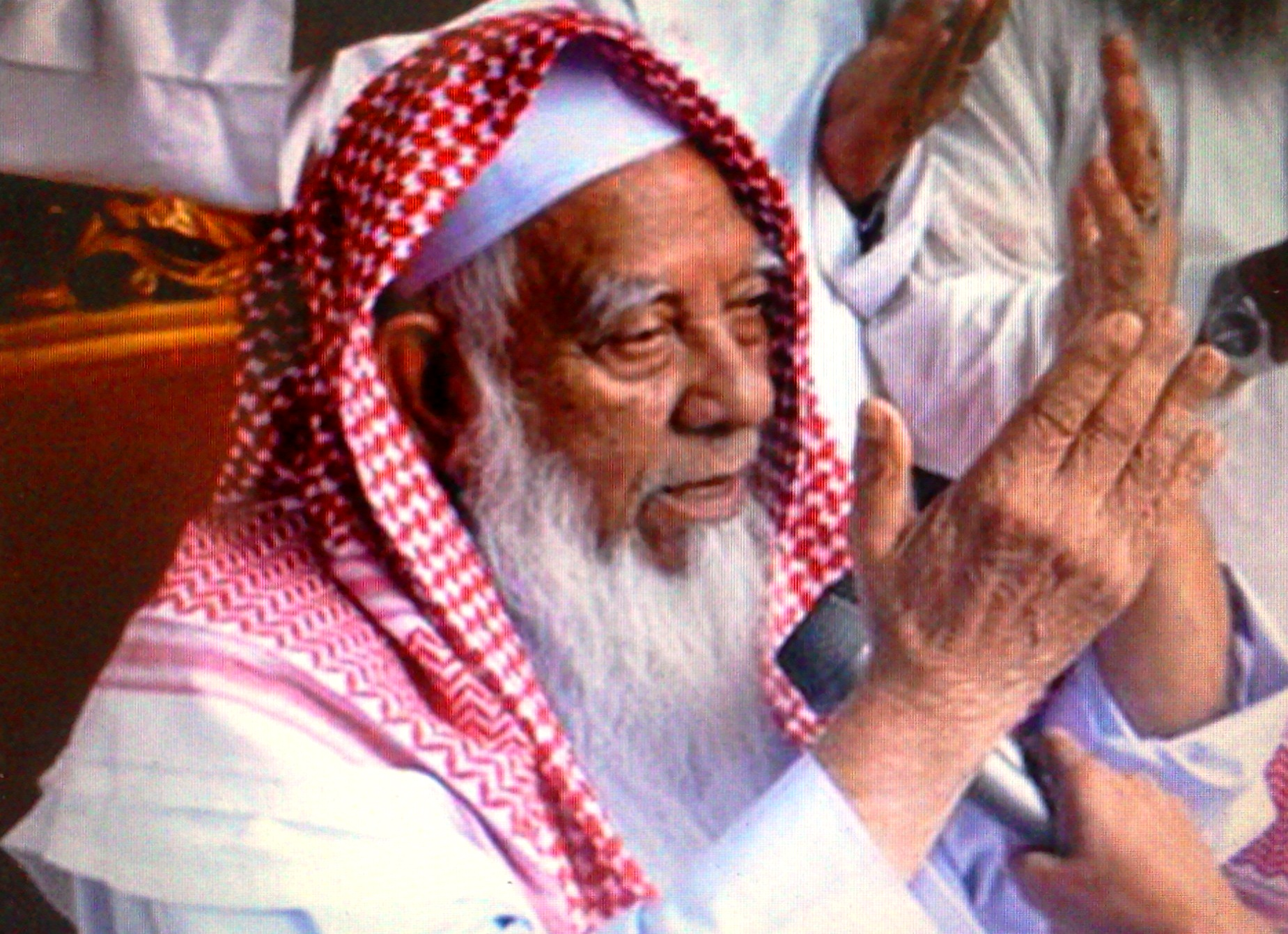
Allama Shafi leading a public du'a after a conference.

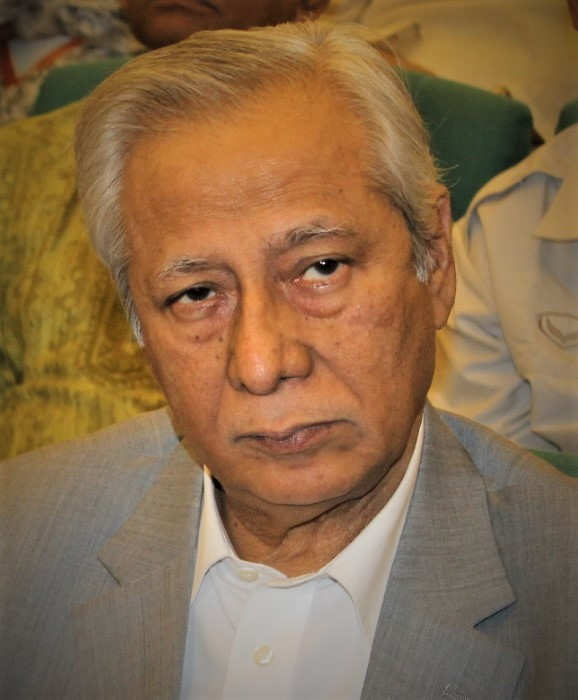
Mahbubey Alam in 2017.

- 5 September - Abu Osman Chowdhury, was a Bangladeshi war hero and freedom fighter.
- 9 September - KS Firoz, a Bangladeshi actor.
- 14 September - Sadek Bachchu, Bangladeshi film actor.
- 18 September - Shah Ahmad Shafi, Bangladeshi Islamic scholar, the chief of Hefajat-e-Islam Bangladesh and the chairman of Bangladesh Qawmi Madrasah Education Board.
- 21 September - AKM Nowsheruzzaman, footballer (b.1949).
- 27 September - Mahbubey Alam, Bangladeshi jurist, Attorney General.

=== October ===
- 5 October - Monsur Ul Karim, Bangladeshi painter.
- 11 October - Mirza Mazharul Islam, Bangladeshi surgeon and political activist.
- 13 October - Rashid Haider, Bangladeshi author and novelist.
- 24 October - Rafique Ul Huq, Bangladeshi lawyer, Attorney General (1990–1991).

=== November ===
- 11 November – Shegufta Bakht Chaudhuri, 86, Bangladeshi economist, Governor of Bangladesh Bank (1987–1992).
- 13 November – Mohammad Ali, Awami League politician, member of Jatiya Sangsad.
- 22 November – Badal Roy, footballer (b. 1957).
- 27 November – Aly Zaker, actor, businessman, and writer (b.1944).
