= 2023 in Bangladesh =

- Centuries: 20th; 21st
- Decades: 2000s; 2010s; 2020s
- See also: Other events of 2023; List of years in Bangladesh

2023 (MMXXIII) was a common year starting on Sunday of the Gregorian calendar, the 2023rd year of the Common Era (CE) and Anno Domini (AD) designations, the 23rd year of the 3rd millennium and the 21st century, and the 4th year of the 2020s decade.

It will follow 1429 and 1430 Baṅgābda (Bengali Year).

The year 2023 is the 52nd year of the independence of Bangladesh. It is also the fifth and last year of the fourth cabinet of Prime Minister Sheikh Hasina and last year of the presidency of Mohammad Abdul Hamid.

== Incumbents ==
=== National ===
==== Current ====
| President | Prime Minister | House Speaker | Chief Justice | Cabinet Secretary | Chief Election Commissioner |
| Shahabuddin Chuppu (Age 74) | Sheikh Hasina Wazed (Age 76) | Shirin Sharmin Chaudhury (Age 57) | Obaidul Hassan (Age 64) | Md. Mahbub Hossain (Age 59) | Kazi Habibul Awal (Age 67) |
|---|---|---|---|---|---|
| Bangladesh Awami League (Since 24 April 2023) | Bangladesh Awami League (Since 6 January 2009) | Bangladesh Awami League (Since 1 May 2013) | Independent (Since 26 September 2023) | Independent (Since 3 January 2023) | Independent (Since 27 February 2022) |

==== Former ====
| Cabinet Secretary | President | Chief Justice |
| Kabir Bin Anwar (Age 59) | Mohammad Abdul Hamid (Age 79) | Hasan Foez Siddique (Age 67) |
|---|---|---|
| Independent (15 December 2022 - 3 January 2023) | Independent (14 March 2013 - 24 April 2023) | Independent (31 December 2021 - 25 September 2023) |

=== Legislature ===
| Legislature | Term | Speaker of the House | Deputy Speaker | Leader of the House | Deputy Leader of the House | Leader of the Opposition | Deputy Leader of the Opposition |
|---|---|---|---|---|---|---|---|
| Jatiya Sangasd | 11th | Shirin Sharmin Chaudhury | Shamsul Hoque Tuku | Sheikh Hasina | Matia Chowdhury | Rowshan Ershad | Ghulam Muhammed Quader |

=== Judiciary ===
- Chief Justice – Hasan Foez Siddique (23rd)
- Attorney General – Abu Mohammad Amin Uddin (16th)

=== Cabinet: Hasina IV ===
==== Ministers ====
| Minister | Portfolio | Ref. |
|---|---|---|
| Sheikh Hasina Wazed | Prime Minister's Office; Cabinet Division; Defence; Armed Forces Division; Power, Energy and Mineral Resources; Public Administration; Women and Children Affairs | |
| Abul Kalam Mohammad Mozammel Huq | Liberation War Affairs | |
| Obaidul Quader | Road Transport and Bridges | |
| Muhammad Abdur Razzaque | Agriculture | |
| Asaduzzaman Khan | Home Affairs | |
| Mohammad Hasan Mahmud | Information and Broadcasting | |
| Anisul Huq | Law, Justice and Parliamentary Affairs | |
| Abu Hena Muhammad Mustafa Kamal | Finance | |
| Mohammad Tazul Islam | Local Government Division; Local Government, Rural Development and Co-operatives | |
| Dipu Moni | Education | |
| Abul Kalam Abdul Momen | Foreign Affairs | |
| Muhammad Abdul Mannan | Planning | |
| Nurul Majid Mahmud Humayun | Industries | |
| Golam Dastagir Gazi | Textiles and Jute | |
| Zahid Maleque | Health and Family Welfare | |
| Sadhan Chandra Majumder | Food | |
| Tipu Munshi | Commerce | |
| Nuruzzaman Ahmed | Social Welfare | |
| Shah Muhammad Rezaul Karim | Fisheries and Livestock | |
| Mohammad Shahab Uddin | Environment, Forest and Climate Change | |
| Bir Bahadur Ushwe Sing | Chittagong Hill Tracts Affairs | |
| Saifuzzaman Chowdhury | Land | |
| Muhammad Nurul Islam Sujan | Railways | |
| Yeafesh Osman | Science and Technology | |
| Mustafa Jabbar | Posts and Telecommunications Division; Posts, Telecommunications and Information Technology | |
| Imran Ahmad | Expatriates' Welfare and Overseas Employment | |

==== Ministers of State ====
| State Minister | Portfolio | Ref. |
|---|---|---|
| Kamal Ahmed Mojumder | Industries | |
| Muhammed Zahid Ahsan Russel | Youth and Sports | |
| Nasrul Hamid | Power, Energy and Mineral Resources | |
| Muhammad Ashraf Ali Khan Khasru | Social Welfare | |
| Begum Monnuzan Sufian | Labour and Employment | |
| Khalid Mahmud Chowdhury | Shipping | |
| Muhammed Zakir Hossain | Primary and Mass Education | |
| Mohammad Shahriar Alam | Foreign Affairs | |
| Zunaid Ahmed Palak | Information and Communication Technology Division; Posts, Telecommunications and Information Technology | |
| Farhad Hossain | Public Administration | |
| Shawpan Bhattacharjee | Rural Development and Co-operatives Division; Local Government, Rural Development and Co-operatives | |
| Zaheed Farooque | Water Resources | |
| Sharif Ahmed | Housing and Public Works | |
| Karim Muhammad Khalid | Cultural Affairs | |
| Mohammed Enamur Rahman | Disaster Management and Relief | |
| Mohammad Mahbub Ali | Civil Aviation and Tourism | |
| Fazilatun Nessa Indira | Women and Children Affairs | |
| Muhammed Faridul Haque Khan | Religious Affairs | |
| Shamsul Alam | Planning | |

==== Deputy Ministers ====
| Deputy Minister | Portfolio | Ref. |
|---|---|---|
| Habibun Nahar | Environment, Forest and Climate Change | |
| Abul Kalam Mohammad Enamul Haque Shamim | Water Resources | |
| Mohibul Hassan Chowdhoury | Education | |

== Events ==
=== January ===
- 2–5 January – Cold wave starts to sweep Bangladesh, mainly in the northern and western parts of the country. As the average temperature drops more than recent years, sufferings for common people increase.
- 3 January – Md. Mahbub Hossain gets appointed as the 24th Cabinet Secretary of Bangladesh after his predecessor Kabir Bin Anwar went into Post Retirement Leave serving for the shortest period of time as Cabinet Secretary of Bangladesh.
- 4 January – By-election held in Gaibandha-5 parliamentary constituency to elect the MP for the vacant seat after being postponed by the Election Commission (EC) for 'mass irregularities', Awami League (AL)-backed candidate Mahmud Hasan Ripon wins in a landslide margin amid low voter-turnout due to cold wave.
- 6 January – The main stage of Chhatra League (BSL)'s (AL's student wing) diamond jubilee (75th anniversary) program collapses due to overcrowding while AL's general-secretary Obaidul Quader was giving his speech, injuring 5. The incident becomes a troll-topic and circulates in social media platforms, while opposition politicians warn the ruling party of 'collapsing from their power', indicating to the incident.
- 14 January – US Secretary of State for South and Central Asian Affairs Donald Lu visits Bangladesh as part of his South Asia trip. In the highest ranking US official visit since the US sanction over Rapid Action Battalion (RAB) in 2021, topics like democracy, election, labor and human rights issues is discussed among top officials. Lu expresses his satisfaction over the tremendous progress of RAB in the matter of reducing extrajudicial killings (The Daily Star).
- 15 January – Veteran AL politician Begum Matia Chowdhury gets appointed and welcomed as the Deputy Leader of the House by Members of the Parliament as the post was vacant for months following the death of Syeda Sajeda Chowdhury.
- 19 January – Country's first ever posthumous organ transplantation takes place on BSMMU. Two kidneys and two corneas of 20-year-old Sarah Islam who was declared brain dead, are transplanted to four individual patients.
- 25 January – Pallabi Metro Station under the MRT Line-6 opens for commuters, becoming the third metro station of Dhaka Metro Rail to open.

=== February ===
- 1 February – By-elections are held in six constituencies which felt vacant after the resignation of Bangladesh Nationalist Party (BNP) lawmakers. AL-backed candidates win in every constituencies except one amid "voter-drought".
- 2 February –
  - Prime Minister inaugurates the construction of the first underground railway project in the country, part of Dhaka Metro Rail.
  - Bangladesh receives the first installment of an IMF loan.
- 9 February – Ishwardi–Rooppur line and Rooppur railway station was established.
- 13 February – 2023 Bangladeshi presidential election: Shahabuddin Chuppu is declared the winner, being the only candidate.
- 14–22 February – Tagore sculpture controversy
- 18 February – Uttara Center metro station opened.
- 19 February – 2023 Gulshan fire.

=== March ===
- 1 March – Mirpur 10 metro station opened.
- 4 March – Six people are killed and several others are injured in a fire and subsequent explosion at an oxygen plant in Sitakunda.
- 5 March – 2023 Kutupalong refugee camp fire: More than 2,000 shelters are destroyed in a fire in the world's largest refugee camp.
- 7 March – 2023 Gulistan explosion: At least 18 people are killed and more than 140 others are injured by an explosion at a commercial seven-story building in Gulistan, Dhaka.
- 11 March - March 2023 Rajshahi University unrest: Over 300 people are injured as students protest at Rajshahi University.
- 19 March – At least 19 people are killed and 25 others are injured when their bus falls into a ditch in Madaripur District, Dhaka Division.
- 29 March – White House debate competition hoax
- 31 March – Uttara South metro station and Shewrapara metro station opened.

=== April ===
- 4 April – 2023 Dhaka Bangabazar fire

=== May ===
- 15 May: Prolific Bangladesh national cricket team win in the One Day International cricket series win against Ireland 2–0.

=== June ===
- 7 June: Fifteen people are killed in a crash between a bus and a truck in Dakshin Surma Upazila, Sylhet District.
- 20 June: Construction project for Hazrat Shahjalal International Airport Pedestrian Underpass was approved.
- 29 June: The highest grossing Bangladeshi film of all-time Priyotoma was released.

=== July ===
- 16 July: Contractual rail workers cause 4 hour long mass blockade of all rail routes to the capital Dhaka city demanding permanency of their jobs.
- 30 July: Boxer Mohammad Alamin 'The Bull' emerged victorious by Technical Knockout against his Thai counterpart, bringing glory to Bangladesh with his remarkable performance in the ring by completing the 4-round bout within the first round as the Evolution Fight Series concluded.

=== August ===
- 17 August: Introduction of the Universal Pension.

=== September ===
- 28 September: 2023 dengue outbreak in Bangladesh: Nearly 1,000 people have died of dengue fever in Bangladesh in recent weeks, in the country's most severe outbreak of the disease so far.

=== October ===
- 23 October: 2023 Dhaka rail collision - A cargo train hits a passenger train in Bhairab, killing at least 15 people and wounding many more.
- 28 October: Prime Minister Sheikh Hasina inaugurates the Bangabandhu Sheikh Mujibur Rahman Tunnel.
- 29 October: Bangladesh Nationalist Party secretary general Mirza Fakhrul Islam Alamgir and at least 164 party members are charged with the murder of a police officer during recent election-related demonstrations.

=== November ===
- 7 November: Bangladesh increases the minimum wage for garment workers by nearly 56% to ৳12,500 (US$113) per month, a move trade unions find insufficient against their demand for a ৳23,000 ($208) threshold amid rising costs of living and inflation.
- 15 November: The Bangladesh Election Commission announces that parliamentary elections will occur on 7 January next year, following weeks of violent protests by supporters of the opposition.

=== December ===
- 17 December: Bangladesh U-19 Cricket Team wins the 2023 ACC Under-19 Asia Cup defeating United Arab Emirates U-19 Cricket Team in the final.

== Deaths ==
=== January ===
- 2 January – Mubasshar Hussein, architect, educationist, sports organizer and freedom fighter (b. 1943)
- 7 January – Habib Ullah Khan, politician and diplomat, minister of information (1970s), minister of jute (1980s), member of parliament (1979–1982) (b. 1935)
- 11 January – Mohammad Enamul Haque Zoj Miah, member of the Jatiya Sangsad (1986–1991) (b. c. 1939).
- 12 January –
  - Muhammad Delwar Hossain, Bargunaiya politician, member of the Jatiya Sangsad (2001–2006) (b. c. 1955)
  - Mozammel Haque, BNP politician, member of the Jatiya Sangsad (2001–2006) (b. 1955/1956)
- 26 January – Mufti Shahidul Islam, Islamist politician, member of the Jatiya Sangsad (2002–2006) (b. 1960)
- 30 January – Shamsul Alam Pramanik, BNP politician, member of the Jatiya Sangsad (1996–2006) (b. c. 1952)

=== February ===
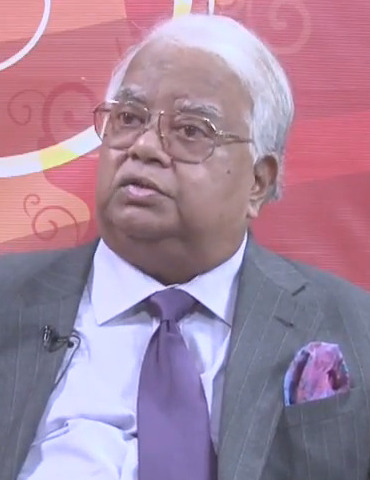
Nazmul Huda in a TV talk show in 2017

- 6 February – Moslem Uddin Ahmad, AL politician, member of the Jatiya Sangsad (2020–2023) (b. 1948)
- 13 February – Reza Ali, businessman, AL politician, member of the Jatiya Sangsad (2009–2014) (b. 1940)
- 19 February – Nazmul Huda, barrister and politician, minister of information (1991–1996) and communication (2001–2006), member of the Jatiya Sangsad (1991–2008) (b. 1943)

=== March ===
- 21 March – Shamim Sikder, sculptor and professor at Dhaka University (b. 1952)
- 29 March – Nur-e-Alam Siddique, AL politician and businessman, war-time student leader known as one of the "Four Caliphs of Bangabandhu" (b. 1944)

=== April ===
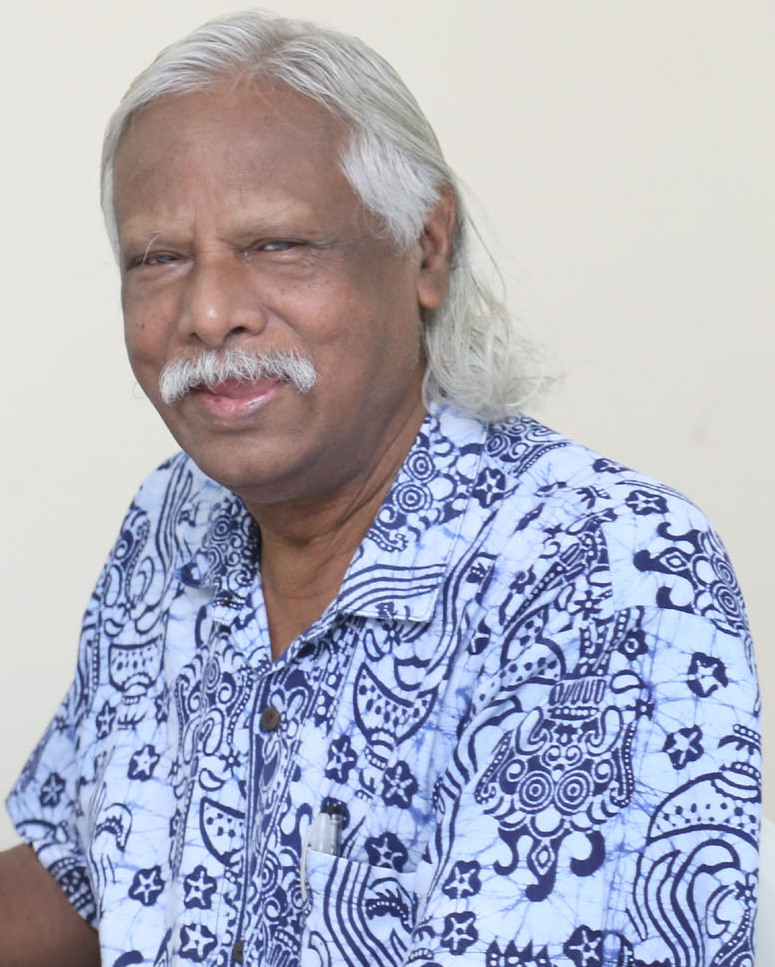
Zafrullah Chowdhury in Suhrawardy Udyan in 2018

- 5 April – Rokia Afzal Rahman, entrepreneur, first female bank manager in Bangladesh, adviser of the Caretaker Government (2001) (b. c. 1941)
- 11 April – Zafrullah Chowdhury, freedom fighter, public health and political activist, founder of Gonoshasthaya Kendra (b. 1941)

== See also ==
=== 2023 ===
- 2023 elections in Bangladesh

=== Country overviews ===
- History of Bangladesh
- Outline of Bangladesh
- Government of Bangladesh
- Politics of Bangladesh
- Timeline of Bangladeshi history
- Years in Bangladesh
- Fire accident in Bangladesh
