= 2019–2020 dengue fever epidemic =

Dengue fever epidemic in 2019–2020

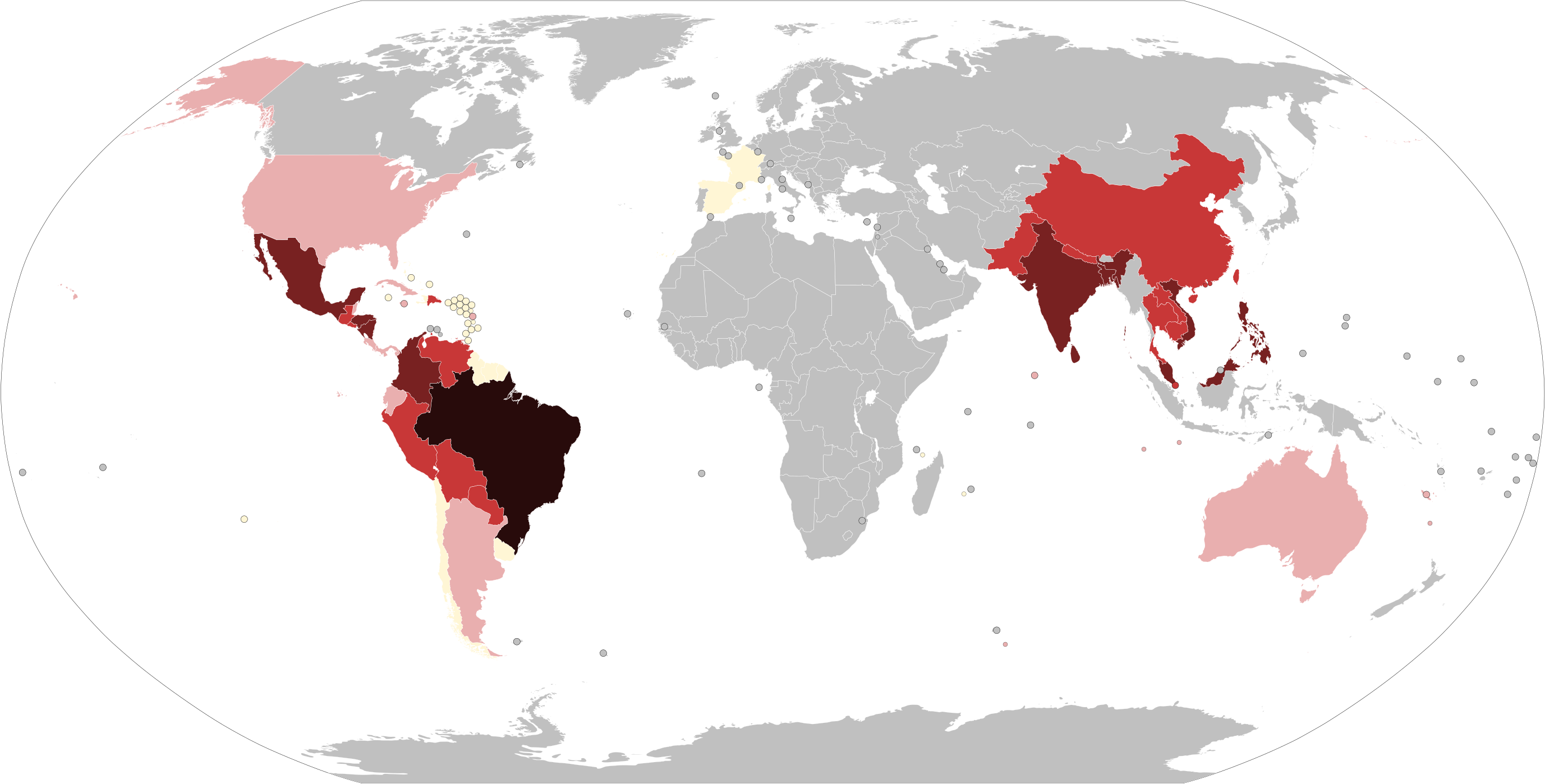
Number of confirmed cases by country: 1,000,000+ cases 100,000–999,999 cases 10,000–99,999 cases 1,000–9,999 cases 1–999 cases No cases reported/no sufficient data

The 2019–2020 dengue fever epidemic was an epidemic of the infectious disease dengue fever in several countries of Southeast Asia, including the Philippines, Malaysia, Vietnam, and Bangladesh, Pakistan, India, Thailand, Singapore, and Laos. The spread of the disease was exacerbated by falling vaccination levels in certain areas, and by a growing population of mosquitoes, which are the primary carriers of the disease, and which are able to reproduce in larger numbers where humans have littered the environment with plastic containers, which provide an ideal breeding ground for mosquitoes. Affected countries have sought to control the epidemic through increased vaccination efforts, and through efforts to control the mosquito population.

== Course in specific countries ==
=== Bangladesh ===
In Bangladesh, the Communicable Disease Control (CDC) unit of the Directorate General of Health Services (DGHS) carried out a survey in Dhaka city in January 2019, where they found both larva and adult Aedes mosquitoes in different parts of the city. Based on the outcome of the survey, in March 2019, warned of a potential outbreak DGHS alerted both city corporations about a possible outbreak in upcoming months. According to CDC director Sanya Tahmina, they also started training the doctors and nurses from February considering the possibility of a future outbreak. The 2019 outbreak in Bangladesh began primarily in April 2019. According to Directorate General of Health Services (DGHS), 14 people had died and 19,513 people had been affected by August 2019, a majority of whom were children, with other sources reporting that the death toll had already passed 50. DGHS confirmed the outbreak affecting all districts of the country, with Dhaka being the worst-hit city in the country and districts in Dhaka Division among the most affected regions. The Institute of Epidemiology, Disease Control and Research (IEDCR) expected the outbreak to continue until September 2019. In August 2019, the Bangladesh government withdrew all tariffs on dengue test kits imports.

=== Malaysia ===
The Malaysian Ministry of Health reported that by 3 August 2019, the number of cases in Malaysia had reached a record 80,000 on the year, with 113 deaths reported. The highest incidences were in the states of Selangor, the Johor, Kelantan, Sabah, Penang, Sarawak, Negeri Sembilan and Pahang, as well as the Federal territories. The Malaysian government sought to counter the epidemic by releasing mosquitoes of the genus Aedes infected with the Wolbachia bacteria, which was expected to reduce the mosquito population.

=== Pakistan ===
In Pakistan, in the summer of 2019, more than 47 people died and more than 30,000 were infected by dengue fever, the worst outbreak of the disease in the history of the country. In October 2019, Prime Minister Imran Khan took notice of the outbreak and sought a report from the Special Assistant to Prime Minister on National Health Services Zafar Mirza. On 10 October 2019, a Peshawar High Court bench sent summons to the Khyber Pakhtunkhwa's provincial health secretary to explain the situation related to dengue outbreak in parts of the province.

=== Philippines ===
In August 2019, the Philippines declared an epidemic after more than 622 people had died of the disease in that country.

The Philippines Department of Health reported that there were over 146,000 dengue fever cases from the beginning of 2019 to 20 July, which was "a 98% increase from the same time period last year". The epidemic occurred in the regions of Calabarzon, Mimaropa, Bicol, Western Visayas, Eastern Visayas, Zamboanga Peninsula, and Northern Mindanao. The epidemic was largely blamed on falling vaccination rates, following a series of issues with the Dengvaxia vaccine manufactured by Sanofi Pasteur. In 2017, Sanofi warned of possible adverse effects, and in 2018 the vaccine was blamed for the deaths of children during a national vaccination program.

=== Singapore ===
In Singapore, there were 15,998 reported cases of dengue fever in 2019, five times more than in 2018 but fewer than previous outbreaks in 2013 and 2014.

2020 started off with a four-year high in the number of people infected with dengue in the first six weeks of the year and eventually broke records for both the number of reported cases and deaths, at 35,315 and 32 respectively.

In 2021, 5,261 people got infected with dengue fever and 5 people died with dengue fever in Singapore.

In 2022, 32,365 people got infected with dengue fever and 19 people died with dengue fever in Singapore.

In 2023, 5,207 people got infected with dengue fever and 2 people died with dengue fever in Singapore.

In total, 94,146 people got infected with dengue fever and 78 people died with dengue fever in Singapore from 2019 to 2023.

=== Vietnam ===
In Vietnam, dengue fever cases tripled from the previous year, to 88,000 by mid-July, with six deaths. By 19 November, Vietnam had recorded 250,000 cases with 50 deaths. The epidemic is most prevalent in the southern region of the country, where locals store rainwater in containers for use in farming, providing a breeding ground for mosquitoes. In neighboring Laos, dengue fever cases exceeded 11,000 by mid-year, with 27 deaths, prompting the Lao Ministry of Health to recommend that likely mosquito breeding sites should be drained.

In total, Vietnam had 815,274 infections and 238 deaths of dengue fever from 2019 to 2023.

=== Latin America ===
In Latin America, 2019 was a record-setting dengue fever outbreak, with more than 2.7 million cases and 1206 deaths during the first 10 months of 2019.

As of 2023, cases and Deaths of dengue fever reached up to 3 million cases and 1302 deaths.

=== Other places ===
In the summer of 2019 an outbreak was confirmed in Oceania. 276 cases and one death were reported in the Marshall Islands, resulting in the government halting travel between the urban centers of Ebeye and Majuro to the outer islands. Outbreakers were also reported in Palau, Federated States of Micronesia, the Cook Islands, Tuvalu, and the Philippines.

The European Centre for Disease Prevention and Control reported that the epidemic had affected the French island of Réunion, off the coast of Africa, with "over 15,000 autochthonous confirmed cases" being reported as of mid-2019, including nine deaths. The ECDC expressed concern that Réunion's European tourism industry could provide a vector for the transmission of the virus to Europe. A systematic review that was done by Ahmed et al. revealed the appearance of autochthonous dengue in Europe along with the increase in imported dengue and dengue severity. Therefore, health authorities pay more attention and update the protocols in order to catch dengue infection among travelers coming from and to Europe.

In November 2019, the epidemic struck Yemen, with nearly 8,000 cases in Taiz Governorate before the end of the month.

== Statistics ==
Cases from 2005 to 15 May 2020
Country and territories	2019		2020		Total		Ref
Country and territories	Cases	Deaths	Cases	Deaths	Cases	Deaths	Ref
Brazil	2,225,461	789	794,565	221	3,020,026	1,010	
Philippines	420,453	1,565	60,819	236	481,272	1,801	
Vietnam	320,702	54	60,525	7	381,227	61	
Mexico	268,458	191	29,941	11	298,399	202	
Nicaragua	186,173	30	22,951	0	209,124	30	
Colombia	127,553	87	49,561	19	177,114	106	
Malaysia	127,407	176	72,952	118	200,359	294	
Bolivia	80,460	23	68,570	19	149,030	42	
India	157,315	166	12,078	8	169,393	174	
Honduras	112,708	180	19,037	9	131,745	189	
Sri Lanka	105,049	90	18,279	0	123,328	90	
Thailand	98,741	106	8,147	4	106,888	110	
Bangladesh	101,354	129	271	0	101,625	129	
Paraguay	11,811	9	61,971	73	73,782	82	
Cambodia	65,000	24	7,823	9	72,823	33	
Pakistan	54,386	95	416	0	54,802	95	
Guatemala	50,432	66	3,384	4	53,816	70	
Singapore	15,998	20	34,690	28	50,688	48	
Laos	38,753	70	7,031	12	45,784	82	
Peru	17,143	37	23,128	32	40,271	69	
El Salvador	27,470	14	2,696	0	30,166	14	
Argentina	3,220	0	25,764	22	28,984	22	
Burma	23,203	123	296		23,499	123	
Dominican Republic	20,183	53	2,875	0	23,058	53	
China	22,211		104	0	22,315	0	
Réunion	18,188	14	1,248	0	19,436	14	
Venezuela	14,701	22	2,885	6	17,586	28	
Ecuador	8,446	2	7,388	6	15,834	8	
Nepal	14,662	6	36	0	14,698	6	
Panama	9,225	5	3,029	2	12,254	7	
Costa Rica	9,400	0	1,568	0	10,968	0	
Belize	8,302	0	473	0	8,775	0	
Jamaica	7,555	24	558	1	8,113	25	
Guadeloupe	3,230	0	4,605	0	7,835	0	
Maldives	4,984	0	1,912	0	6,896	0	
New Caledonia	3,916	2	34	0	3,950	2	
Sudan	3,823	11			3,823	11	
Mayotte	153	0	3,533	16	3,686	16	
French Polynesia	3,196	0	431	0	3,627	0	
Cuba	3,259	0			3,259	0	
Marshall Islands	1,483	1	1,659	2	3,142	3	
Martinique	1,530	0	802	0	2,332	0	
Australia	1,419	0	174	0	1,593	0	
Antigua and Barbuda	1,223	0	341	0	1,564	0	
Saint Martin	260	0	1,250	1	1,510	1	
United States	1,158	0	107	0	1,265	0	
Dominica	1,066	1	37	0	1,103	1	
French Guiana	250	0	719	0	969	0	
Trinidad and Tobago	416	0	20	0	436	0	
Suriname	86	0	157	0	243	0	
Guyana	230	0	10	0	240	0	
Puerto Rico	30	0	112	0	142	0	
Aruba	106	0	0	0	106	0	
Haiti	93	0	9	0	102	0	
Chile	38	0	7	0	45	0	
Barbados	44	0	0	0	44	0	
Bahamas	27	0	0	0	27	0	
Uruguay	0	0	14	0	14	0	
Angola	6	0	6	0	12	0	
Bermuda	2	0	0	0	2	0	
Total	4,700,522	3,244	1,461,872	686	6,162,394	3,930	

== See also ==
- 2019 dengue outbreak in Bangladesh
- 2019 dengue outbreak in Pakistan
