= Fulbaria railway station =

Defunct railway station in Bangladesh

Fulbaria Railway Station ফুলবাড়িয়া রেলওয়ে স্টেশন
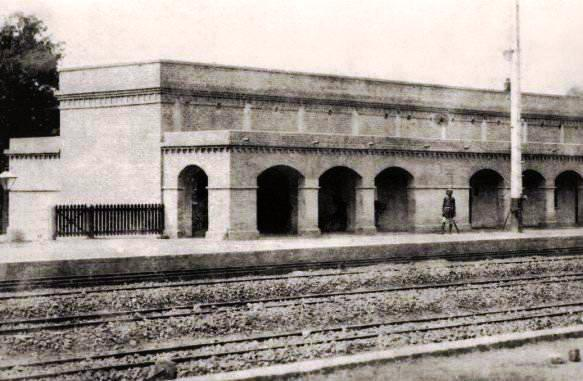

General information
- Other names: Dacca Railway Station
- Location: Fulbaria, Dhaka; Bangladesh
- Coordinates: 23°43′28″N 90°24′21″E
- Line: Narayanganj–Bahadurabad Ghat line
- Platforms: 1
- Tracks: 1,000 mm (3 ft 3 3/8 in)

Other information
- Status: Defunct
- Station code: DA

History
- Opened: 1885
- Closed: 1 May 1968
- Former names: Assam Bengal Railway (1885–1947); Pakistan Eastern Railway (1947–1968)
Location

Fulbaria Railway Station is a defunct railway station in Bangladesh which was located near Bangabazar, Dhaka. It was the central railway station of Bangladesh (then East Pakistan) before Dhaka railway station became operational on 1 May 1968. Fulbaria station was closed on 1 May 1968.

== History ==
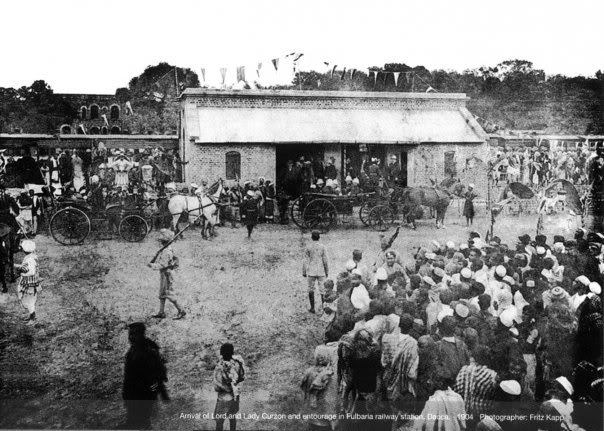
Fulbaria railway station in 1904

In 1885, Dacca State railway built Narayanganj–Bahadurabad Ghat line and opened its part for train service from Dacca (now Old Dhaka) to Narayanganj. In that time Fulbaria railway station was built with other facilities. It was established on the south side of the then main city of Dacca. In the same year, railway connections from Dhaka to Narayanganj and Dhaka to Mymensingh were established. After the partition of India in 1947, Dhaka became the main city and capital of East Bengal. Then the area of Fulbaria became densely populated which became a major obstacle for train movement. As a result, it was planned to move this station. Later, in the late 1950s, the construction of the new central railway station for the province and a new railway line was started on a large scale in the Kamalapur, Shahjahanpur area of Dhaka and it was completed in 1968.

Earlier, the railway used to go straight from Tejgaon railway station to Fulbaria. Due to the opening of Kamalapur station, the railway line was shifted from Tejgaon. From Tejgaon the line took a left to Kamalapur. As a result, the earlier Fulbaria–Tejgaon line was abandoned. Later the line was removed and a road was built in the same place. On the other hand, all the structures of Fulbaria station were also removed. At present, there are bus counters of BRTC, shops, runways etc.

== Structure ==
Fulbaria railway station had a station house and three lines in front of it. The station belonged to the metre-gauge railway. Although the station was named Fulbaria, the nameplates at both ends of the platform were inscribed with "Dacca", as the station was officially operated as "Dacca Railway Station". The same rule was later applied to Kamalapur railway station.

== Ticket selling point ==
In 2019, train tickets were sold from this station building on the occasion of Eid. Two years later the counter was shifted from the building after it was demolished.
