= Bangabazar =

Market neighbourhood in Dhaka

Bangabazar (Bengali: বঙ্গবাজার, romanized: Bongobajar, lit. 'Bazaar of Bengal') is a bazaar Located in Fulbaria, Dhaka. It is mainly known as the market for the ready-made garment industry. Until the mid-1950s, the Old Dhaka railway station was at Fulbaria. This market is mainly built around this station. Currently, it is managed by Dhaka South City Corporation. It is one of the leading garment markets in the country.

== History ==
In 1965, Bangabazar was commonly the place of hawkers and small shopkeepers. In 1975, the Fulbaria railway station was shifted to Kamalapur. After, the Dhaka Municipality demolished previous market structure and made it a market with permanent structure. In 1985, it was acquired by the government and came under the administration of the Dhaka Municipal Corporation and in 1989, it was made into a paved mall.

== Fire ==
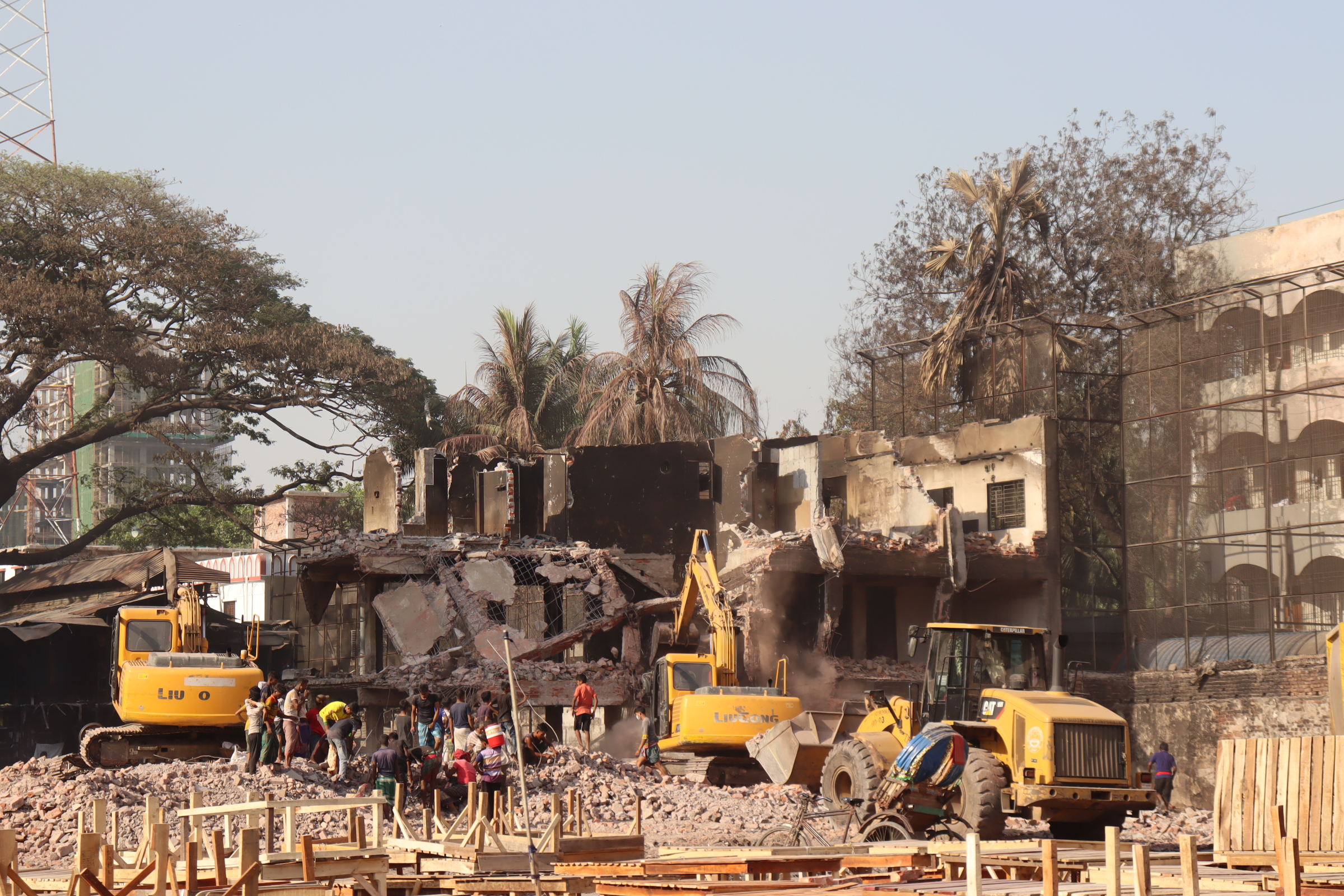
Situation after 2023 Dhaka Bangabazar fire

2023 Dhaka Bangabazar fire incident happened on 4th April 2023 at a popular clothing market in the Bangladeshi capital, Dhaka. Thousands of shops were burned down in the incident. It took over six hours for the combined forces of firefighters, military and police force to bring the fire under control. On 29 April 2023, Despite the risk and ongoing reconstruction of shops, some shop were opened in Bangabazar.
