= Ramchand Goala =

Bangladeshi cricketer (1940–2020)

Personal information
- Born: 1940; Mymensingh, Bangladesh
- Died: 19 June 2020 (aged 79)
- Role: left arm spinner

Ramchand Goala (1940 – 19 June 2020) was a Bangladeshi cricketer and cricket coach. He featured in early Bangladesh side in 1980's and became a pioneer left arm spinner in Bangladesh. He remained as a bachelor.

== Career ==
He played club cricket primarily in Dhaka and Mymensingh representing Abahani from 1981 to 1993. He made his debut for Victoria Club in Dhaka Premier League in 1962. He received his maiden national callup at the age of 40 and represented Bangladesh team against touring Bengal team in 1983 and also played against touring Sri Lankans in 1985. He retired from playing competitive cricket at the age of 53. He also later went onto pursue his career as a coach and also had a short stint as mentor to Mahmudullah.

== Death ==
He died in Mymensingh in his residence at the age of 79 on 19 June 2020 after being admitted at the Lab Aid Hospital following a stroke. He lived with grandson Pranjal Goala until his demise.
