= 2023 dengue outbreak in Bangladesh =

Disease outbreak

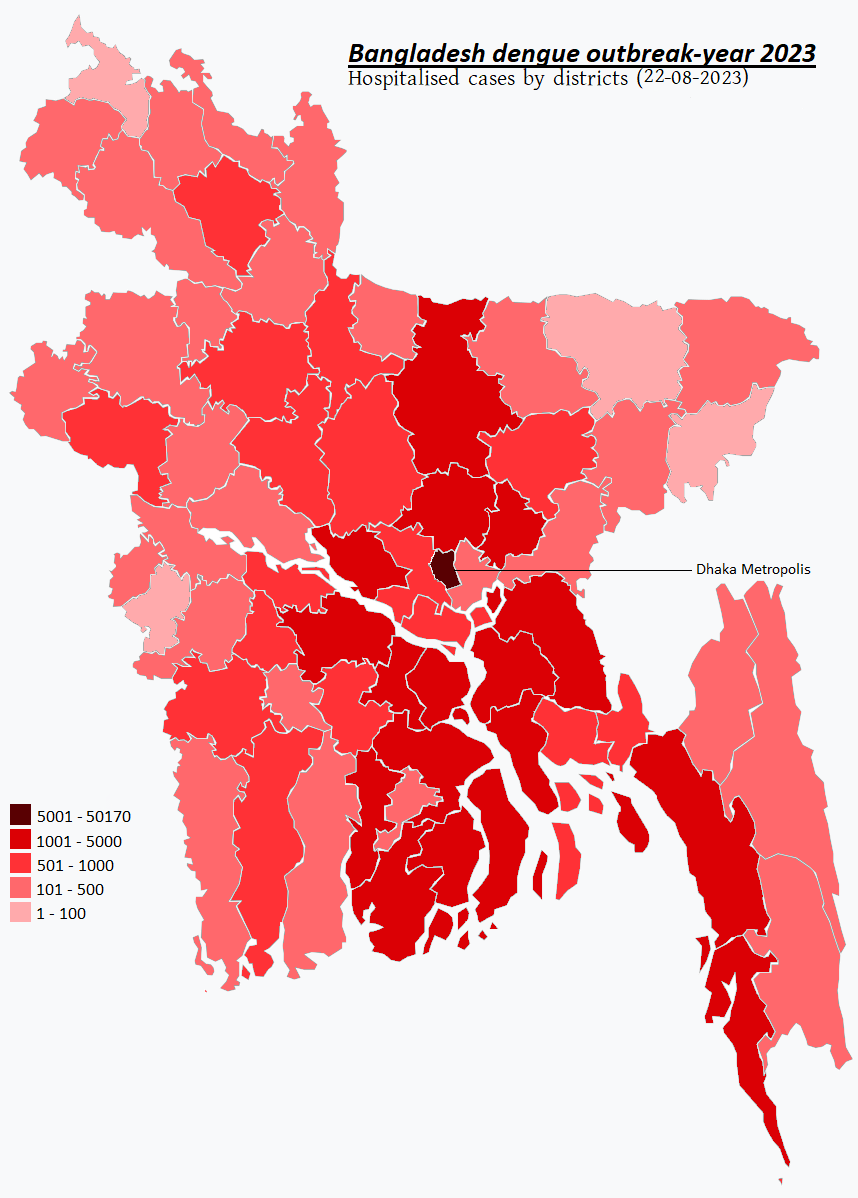
- Dengue hospitalizations by district and Dhaka metropolis, as of 17 September 2023
- Disease: Dengue fever
- Date: 2023 (Outbreak season: April 2023–ongoing)
- Active cases: 725 (Note: Currently hospitalized)
- Suspected cases: ~750,000
- Hospitalized cases: 321,179
- Recovered: 318,749 (Note: Discharged from hospital)
- Deaths: 1,705
- Fatality rate: 0.53%

Government website
- DGHS dengue status reports

In Bangladesh's 2023 dengue epidemic season, the country had witnessed the deadliest outbreak of dengue fever ever since the first outbreak in Bangladesh in 2000. As of 31 December 2023, the Directorate General of Health Services (DGHS) has reported 321,179 hospitalizations and 1,705 deaths due to the Aedes mosquito-borne tropical disease in the 2023 outbreak year. Like previous years, the outbreak started in Summer (April–May), spread and surged nationwide in the monsoons (July–August). On 3 August, the number of deaths surpassed previous years; and on 21 August, the tally of hospitalization surpassed the previous highest record of the 2019 outbreak. Dhaka is the worst-hit area and the epicentre of the outbreak, with more than half of the cases being reported in the megacity. On 25 July, hospitalizations were reported in all districts; and the tally of hospitalizations outside Dhaka city surpassed the figure of the capital on 14 August.

In June 2023, the Institute of Epidemiology, Disease Control and Research (IEDCR) reported that people are getting affected with the DENV-2 and DENV-3 variants this season, the two with the highest rates of infections and death. In 2022 and 2021, DENV-4 and DENV-3 were found for the first time, respectively. Although a patient does develop immunity to a certain variant after being infected with it, cross-infection with different variants raises the chance of complications and mortality. Secondary infections show changed symptoms, thus delayed hospitalizations are causing more deaths. It's notable that the death rate has more or less increased in Bangladesh in past years. With more severe cases being referred to the capital, Dhaka's hospitals struggle to control the situation.

== Outbreak Background ==
According to the World Health Organization, Dengue Fever is a primarily mosquito-borne illness that can last between 1 and 2 weeks with a majority of cases not showing any symptoms. In cases with symptoms, the WHO says that the most common symptoms are "high fever, headache, body aches, nausea and rash" and the symptoms can last between 2 and 7 days from the first observation, although in severe cases hospitalization and death are possible. While no dengue-specific treatment exists, prevention by avoiding mosquito-heavy areas and draining standing water are the most common ways to prevent and deal with the illness. DEN-1, DEN-2, DEN-3, and DEN-4 are the main observed strains of Dengue in Bangladesh with any strain giving previously infected individuals cross-immunity between the different strains. However, the individual will only retain long-term immunity against the strain that the individual was infected with originally meaning that someone can be infected up to four times in their lifetime.

Bangladesh has also experienced several smaller spread Dengue outbreaks with a notable outbreak in 2000 infecting 5,551 individuals and resulting in the deaths of 93. Since 2017 the most common form of Dengue has been DEN-3, and according to the Bangladesh Medical Research Council from 20 to 19 indicated an increase in the density of mosquitos in and around Dhaka in the "monsoon survey (18-27 July 2019) of 100 sites of 98 wards in Dhaka city both North and South revealed that the number of adult aedes mosquito was increased by 13.52 folds, in compare to the pre-monsoon (3-12 March 2019) survey."

Bangladesh is a nation particularly vulnerable to Dengue Fever due to the warm climate and heavy rainfall, enabling the fever to spread through Aedes aegypti and Aedes albopictus mosquitoes which are described by the UN as "long plagued tropical and sub-tropical regions". ACAPS noted in a briefing note that "Dengue outbreaks usually coincide with the warmer months and monsoon season" which for Bangladesh is typically between May and September. ACAPS also noted that poor urban planning for water and waste allowed water to sit in dense areas, allowing mosquitoes to have ease of spreading and reaching humans.

== See also ==
- 2019 dengue outbreak in Bangladesh
- List of epidemics
