= Hazrat Shahjalal International Airport Pedestrian Underpass =

Pedestrian underpass in Dhaka, Bangladesh

HSIA Pedestrian Underpass
- Interactive map of HSIA Pedestrian Underpass

Overview
- Location: Airport roundabout, Airport Road, Dhaka, Bangladesh
- Coordinates: 23.8505238°N 90.4084548°E
- Status: Under construction

Operation
- Work began: December 2023
- Owner: Dhaka North City Corporation
- Character: Pedestrian tunnel

Technical
- Design engineer: 24th Engineer Brigade, Bangladesh Army
- Length: 1.07 kilometres
- Tunnel clearance: 4.3 m (14 ft)

Hazrat Shahjalal International Airport Pedestrian Underpass (Bengali: হজরত শাহজালাল আন্তর্জাতিক বিমানবন্দর পথচারী আন্ডারপাস) is a pedestrian underpass under construction located in Dhaka, Bangladesh.

== Background ==
In 2012, construction project of Dhaka BRT was started on the Airport Road which connects Hazrat Shahjalal International Airport and Dhaka Airport railway station. Incidents happen while crossing the road to go towards the airport at the west and the railway station and Ashkona, a suburb near the road, at the east. In 2014, the then prime minister Sheikh Hasina announced an ongoing plan to build a pedestrian underpass that would connect the railway station and the airport. In 2017, at an meeting of the Executive Committee of the National Economic Council, Hasina opined that accidents and unwanted incidents could be reduced if two separate tunnels were constructed there so that Hajj pilgrims and commuters could easily access to the airport. She was then informed by M.A.N. Siddique, the then secretary of the Road Transport and Highways Division, that they had received a green signal from the Ministry of Railways to use railway's land for the construction of the underpass at the proposed place. In 2018, Hasina ordered to build it there. It was known in 2019 by the Road Transport and Highways Division that the government is planning to build "an integrated pedestrian underpass" to reduce incidents on Airport Road. It was announced to complete its detailed design in September of the same year. In February 20 of the same year, a committee was constituted to specify the alignment of the proposed structure. The committee made the alignment final four days later.

It was decided to connect two terminals of the airport, the railway station, the proposed metro station at Kawla, proposed BRT station at the airport area and Haji Camp in Ashkona by the proposed underpass. To build it, tenders were invited with deadline on 27 December 2020. But as But the tender was cancelled before the deadline as the transfer letter was not received from the government authorities of the land required for the construction, the Directorate of Roads and Highways, the Civil Aviation Authority of Bangladesh and the Bangladesh Railway. As of a report by The Business Standard, the proposed pedestrian underpass would be 620 meters with 4.3 meters height. Its proposed budget was ৳42.089 billion at first.

In 2021, a meeting of the government on Public Private Partnership-related projects revealed that the availability of land for construction of the underpass has become uncertain for the Dhaka BRT and the need for a detailed survey to resolve was mentioned.

As multiple construction projects of various authorities including Dhaka Elevated Expressway were underway at the proposed site of the underpass, a meeting of the responsible authorities led by the Dhaka Transport Coordination Authority was held on 4 July 2022 to discuss coordination of other projects with the underpass. 24th Engineer Brigade of Bangladesh Army was responsible for feasibility study of the proposed pedestrian underpass which was supposed to be completed by September or October in 2022. Besides, JPZ Consulting Bangladesh Limited was also involved in the feasibility study of the project.

In 2023, it is reported that the proposed underpass would be 1.07 km long and would connect two terminals of the airport as well as a third terminal under construction. Its construction cost was estimated at ৳118.387 billion. When the design of the underpass was shown to Hasina on 22 February 2023, she expressed her satisfaction saying that the construction project had everything it needed. After construction, it will be the largest pedestrian underpass in the country.

== Construction ==
On 20 June 2023, the construction project of the pedestrian underpass was approved, which is scheduled to be completed by June 2025. The plan envisages 9 entrances and exits for the underpass. The air-conditioned underpass is expected to have lift, escalator and traveler facilities. ৳55 billion was sought as construction cost for 2023–2024. However, it was informed that even if the application for money was approved, it would not be available immediately. For that, experts believe that the completion of the construction work may be delayed.

The 24th Engineer Brigade was tasked with the construction of the proposed underpass and started construction in December 2023 which would be fully funded by the government.

On 3 July 2024, it was decided to close the section of Airport–Dakshinkhan road from the railway station to Hajj Camp till 31 October 2024 for construction work. However, as of July 2025, the street was still closed for the construction.
