= White House debate competition hoax =

2023 hoax in Bangladesh

On 29 March 2023 several prominent news media outlets in Bangladesh disseminated a report claiming that a Bangladeshi schoolboy had achieved extraordinary success in a virtual parliamentary debate tournament organized by the White House, which later turned out to be a hoax. The perpetrator forged documents, including certificates and news screenshots, and created a fake website to fabricate their success in a debate competition organized by the White House. The competition itself did not exist, and the claims made by them were debunked by multiple fact-checking teams.

== Background ==
According to the circulated reports, a Bangladeshi schoolboy, Shah Muhammad Rakib Hasan, 17, purportedly achieved unprecedented success in a virtual parliamentary debate tournament organized by the White House. The news claimed that the student had broken all existing records, demonstrating exceptional debating skills and outperforming participants from around the world, and he was to be awarded by the president of the United States, Joe Biden, but he couldn't receive it as he was not able to get a visa.

=== Media circulation ===
The news of the Bangladeshi schoolboy's alleged triumph swiftly gained traction in the media. Numerous reputed news outlets within the country, including Prothom Alo, The Daily Star, Kaler Kantho, Bhorer Kagoj, RTV, Samakal, Janakantha, Somoy TV, The Business Standard, Jagonews24, The Financial Express (opinion), Bangladesh Today, Jugantor, and Channel 24 featured articles and reports highlighting the remarkable achievement. These publications showcased the student's accomplishment and celebrated Bangladesh's representation on an international platform.

== Verification and fact-checking ==
Following the widespread dissemination of the news, doubts and questions arose regarding the authenticity of the reported achievement. Various individuals and media organizations-initiated fact-checking processes to ascertain the veracity of the claims. Fact-checking endeavors involved scrutinizing the available information, contacting relevant authorities, and corroborating details to establish the accuracy of the reported incident.

=== Investigation findings ===
The media quickly picked up on the story, and several news outlets published articles highlighting Rakib's alleged accomplishments. However, after the fact-checking investigations unfolded, it became apparent that the initial reports were not based on accurate information. Authorities, including the White House, were contacted, and it was confirmed that no virtual parliamentary debate tournament, as described in the circulated reports, had been organized by the White House.

==== Rumor Scanner ====
One notable fact-checking report originated from RumorScanner, an online platform specializing in fact-checking and debunking misinformation. They initially reported on Rakib's made-up achievement in the White House Debating Competition on 1 April 2023. Claims were made that US President Joe Biden attended the contest on March 28, but an analysis of Biden's schedule for that day showed no program at the White House South Court Auditorium. The team also checked the official White House website but found no statements or information about the contest or Biden's involvement.

Rakib posted pictures on his Facebook account claiming to have legal documents and certificates from the competition. The team analyzed the images and found discrepancies in the names and text on the certificates. The signatures of the White House Head Counsel and the White House Chief of Staff were forged, while the signature of Joe Biden matched a readily available signature found on the internet.

Rakib also shared screenshots of news articles from supposed publications such as The New York Times and BBC News. However, the team determined that the screenshots were fake and likely created using a website called Fodey, which allows users to generate newspaper screenshots for entertainment purposes.

Further investigation revealed that Rakib had not posted anything about the competition before March 19, despite the competition period being from February 27 to March 14. The team also discovered a fake website, The Whitehouse, created on WordPress, which contained posts about the competition and its results. Rakib directed the team to this website, but the results had been removed since then.

==== The Daily Star ====
The Daily Star, a leading Bangladeshi newspaper, took the initiative to investigate the matter further. Their investigation revealed discrepancies in Rakib's story and led to the conclusion that he had fabricated his achievement in the debate competition. As a result of The Daily Star's investigation, it became apparent that Rakib's claims were false, and he had not participated in any official White House Debating Competition. The story began to unravel, casting doubt on the initial media reports.

==== The Business Standard ====
In response to the growing skepticism, other media outlets such as The Business Standard (TBS) also conducted their own fact-checking inquiries. These investigations reinforced the findings of The Daily Star, confirming that Rakib had indeed deceived the media and the public. Furthermore, subsequent inquiries failed to identify any Bangladeshi student who had achieved the alleged remarkable feat in any legitimate international debate competition during the specified period.

== Removal of initial reports ==
As of June 2023, some of the publications have removed the initial reports after it turned out to be a hoax, while some reports from several other outlets remain published to this day.
