= 2019 dengue outbreak in Bangladesh =

Disease outbreak in Bangladesh

- Bangladesh centered on the map
- Disease: Dengue fever
- Pathogen: Dengue virus
- First outbreak: Bangladesh
- Dates: April 2019 – January 2020
- Confirmed cases: 101,354 (in 2019); 241 (in 2020)
- Deaths: 179

The 2019 dengue outbreak in Bangladesh is a nationwide occurrence of dengue fever in Bangladesh that began primarily in April 2019 and is still ongoing. According to Directorate General of Health Services (DGHS), 14 people have died and 19,513 people have been affected as of 1 August 2019, majority of whom are children. Although other sources are reporting the death toll has already passed 50. On 1 August 2019, DGHS confirmed the outbreak affecting all districts of the country. Additionally, it reported 1,712 newly infected patients in the preceding 24 hours which is also the largest number of infected people on record in a single day. According to official source, roughly 71 more people are being infected in dengue fever every hour. Dhaka is the worst-hit city in the country and the districts in Dhaka Division are among the most affected regions. Experts feared that the situation would deteriorate as a lot of people traveled from major cities to rural areas to celebrate Eid al-Adha holidays in August. The Institute of Epidemiology, Disease Control and Research (IEDCR) expects the outbreak to continue till September 2019.

The Communicable Disease Control (CDC) unit of DGHS warned about the outbreak in March 2019. In January they carried out a survey in Dhaka city where they found both larva and adult Aedes mosquitoes in different parts of the city. Based on outcome of the survey, they alerted both city corporations about the possibility of an outbreak in upcoming months. As said by the CDC director Dr. Sanya Tahmina, they also started training the doctors and nurses from February considering the possibility of a future outbreak.

In August 2019, Bangladesh Governments withdraws all tariffs on dengue test kits imports.

== History ==
Dengue fever was first observed in Bangladesh in 2000, claimed 93 deaths in that year. After 3 years the deaths have gradually decreased to almost zero. However it struck again in 2018, killed 26 and affected 10,148 people. The previous highest of affected people prior to 2018 was 6,232 in 2002.

== See also ==
- 2023 dengue outbreak in Bangladesh
