= Universal Pension =

The Universal Pension (Bengali: সার্বজনীন পেনশন) is a system of the Bangladesh Government's pension arrangement. Benefits vary depending on the age of the individual and their contribution record. Anyone can make a claim, provided they have a minimum number of qualifying years of contributions.

== Background ==
In the manifesto published by the Awami League for the 2008 general elections, the party promised to formulate a pension system for all classes of citizens. On 30 June 2016, while presenting the budget plan for the fiscal year 2016–2017, Abul Maal Abdul Muhith, the then finance minister, expressed his interest in introducing a pension scheme for private sector employees and revamping the country's pension system. As the number of senior citizens is increasing in Bangladesh, he proposed this plan considering their safety. In 2019, the introduction of universal pension system was announced in the budget speech for the fiscal year 2019–2020. In the same year, Muhammad Abdul Mannan, the planning minister, had informed that the proposed pension scheme for senior citizens would be universal and a special cell in the finance ministry had already started working to implement it. On 17 February 2022, Sheikh Hasina, prime minister of the country, directed the Finance Ministry to enact a law for this new pension system as soon as possible after presenting the prepared strategy paper on universal pension system at Ganabhaban. On 30 March 2022, the draft of Universal Pensions Act was published. Finance Minister Mustafa Kamal announced on 9 June 2022 that the universal pension system would be introduced in the fiscal year 2023–2024. 6 July 2023 The National Pension Authority was constituted to implement the universal pension system. The universal pension was supposed to be launched in July 2023, but the launch date was confirmed on 17 August 2023. Sheikh Hasina inaugurated the universal pension system on the promised day.

== Overview ==
=== Policy ===
Universal pension will be regulated through Sonali Bank. From September 2023, any Bangladeshi citizen between the ages of 18 and 50 can get this pension voluntarily, in the future this pension will be mandatory for all. In order to get pension, a citizen has to contribute for at least ten years, the amount of which he can specify himself. If the person dies before the age of ten, the money will be given to their heirs. In the case of private employees, if the organization joins the universal pension, the amount of contribution will be fixed by the National Pension Authority. Failure to ensure payment of full contribution before the end of the year will result in suspension of the pension account for a temporary period which can be activated by payment of arrears. Once the pension account holder attains the age of 60 years, they will continue to receive pension at a monthly rate which will be equal to the total amount of their accumulated amount plus the dividend received from investments. In case of death 5 years before attaining the age of 80 years the pension of the individual will be paid to his nominee. Half of the deposited amount can be availed as money loan. If a person contributes continuously from the age of 18 to 42 years, they will get ৳64,776 per month as pension from the age of 60 and if someone contributes from the age of 30 to 30 years, he will be given ৳18,908 per month as pension from the age of 60.

=== Types ===
Four types of pension will be provided under Universal Pension:

- Progoti: It is for employees from non-governmental organizations. Its monthly subscription rate is from ৳1,000 to ৳5,000.
- Surokkha: It is for self-employmed people. Its monthly subscription rate is from ৳500 to ৳5,000.
- Somota: It is for low-income people who are living below the poverty line. Its monthly subscription rate is ৳500. 50% of the subscription will be provided by the government.
- Probashi: It is for citizens working in foreign land. Its monthly subscription rate is from ৳500 to ৳5,000.

== Implementation ==
The governing board will manage the system that consists of 15 members.

- Governor of Bangladesh Bank
- Secretary of Bangladesh Bank
- Secretary of Finance Department
- Chairman of Financial Institutions Division
- Secretary of National Board of Revenue
- Secretary of Ministry of Social Welfare
- Secretary of Ministry of Women and Children Affairs
- Secretary of Ministry of Expatriates' Welfare and Overseas Employment
- Secretary to the Ministry of Labor and Employment
- Secretary of Ministry of Posts, Telecommunications and Information Technology
- Chairman of the Prime Minister's Office
- Chairman of Bangladesh Securities and Exchange Commission
- President of Federation of Bangladesh Chambers of Commerce & Industries
- President of Bangladesh Employers Federation
- Executive Chairman of Bangladesh Women Chamber of Commerce and Industry
- President of Bangladesh Employers Federation of Bangladesh

== Reaction ==
An editorial published in Jugantor termed the scheme as "a great and groundbreaking step" and said it would improve the standard of living of the people of the country. Although this pension system is called "universal", according to economists, it is not universal because not all classes of citizens have the means to participate. They call it "contributory pension". According to economists, the purpose of the government's introduction of this pension system should be to try to bring maximum number of citizens of the state under pension. The universal pension system has been criticized by opposition political parties. Some parliamentarians took a stand against the law on the management of universal pensions when it was tabled in the National Parliament. According to Member of Parliament and Jatiya Party politician Mujibul Haque, there is no difference with the deposit pension scheme of banks. Also unclear is the government's contribution to universal pensions. Member of Parliament Rezaul Karim Bablu expressed doubts whether people will actually benefit from this universal pension as there is a pension system for government employees in the country but many of them are not getting the pension benefits after retirement due to administrative complications. Fakhrul Imam, another Member of Parliament of the Jatiya Party, considers this pension system to be in conflict with the country's constitution. According to Yawar Saeed, a fund management expert, it is a good initiative if the government cannot use pension money arbitrarily without accountability. On 18 August 2023, Mirza Fakhrul Islam Alamgir, the Secretary General of the Bangladesh Nationalist Party, alleged that the government wants to embezzle people's money and hold the upcoming election by introducing this pension system. Bangladeshi Islamic scholar Sheikh Ahmadullah praised the intuitive and also called on the government to introduce an Islamic scheme under the same system.
