= 2023 Dhaka rail collision =

2023 train collision in Dhaka

Details
- Date: October 23, 2023; 3:30 p.m. (UTC+6)
- Location: Bhairab, Dhaka, Bangladesh
- Country: Bangladesh
- Line: Tongi–Bhairab–Akhaura line
- Operator: Bangladesh Railway
- Incident type: Rear-end collision
- Cause: Under investigation; possibly signal error

Statistics
- Trains: 2
- Deaths: 17
- Injured: 75+
- Damage: Three carriage of passenger train derailed, two of them overturned.

The 2023 Dhaka rail collision was a train accident that took place on October 23, 2023. when a freight train hit the rear two cars of a passenger train, resulting in the deaths of 17 people.

== Accident ==
The Egarosindhur Godhuli Express was heading to Dhaka and had just departed Bhairab Bazar Junction at around 3:30 p.m. A freight train heading to Chattogram was also on the same line.

The collision occurred when the cargo train rear-ended a passenger train, derailing the three rearmost cars. The impact of the collision overturned two of the cars, trapping many passengers inside of it.

The accident killed 17 people and injured 26 people.

== Investigation ==
Initial reports said that the driver of the freight train might have violated the red signal, resulting in the freight train colliding with the express.

A probe has since been launched to determine the exact cause, but poor rail infrastructure has been cited as a common cause for accidents along this railway. A similar accident in April 2023 occurred nearby, with the cause later being determined as a signal error.
