= Bharateswari Homes =

Bharateswari Homes ভারতেশ্বরী হোমস

Location
- Mirzapur-1940, Tangail; Bangladesh
- Coordinates: 24°5′50.72″N 90°5′37.88″E

Information
- Former name: Bharateswari Bidyapith
- Established: 1945
- School district: Tangail
- Trust: Kumudini Welfare Trust
- Chairman: Rajiv Prasad Saha
- Grades: 1-12
- Gender: Girls
- Accreditation: Board of Intermediate and Secondary Education, Dhaka
- Website: bharateswarihomes.edu.bd

Bharateswari Homes is a boarding school for girls located in Mirzapur, Tangail District, Bangladesh. The school was established in 1945 by philanthropist Ranadaprasad Saha (RP Saha). He established the institution for the girls education and named it after his grandmother Bharateswari Devi. In 2020, the school was given Independence Day Award, the highest civilian honor of Bangladesh, for its contribution to education.

== History ==
The institute belongs to Kumudini Welfare Trust of Bengal (BD) Ltd which also owns Kumudini Hospital and other institutes. The trust was founded by RP Saha. The school started as Bharateswari Bidyapith, a primary school. The foundation stone of Bharateswari Homes was laid on 2 January 1938 by Kiron Bala Saha, wife of RP Saha.

He and his son Bhavani Prasad Shaha were captured and killed by the Pakistani army on 7 May 1971. His daughter Joya Pati took the charge of the Trust after his death. As of 2007, RP Saha's grandson, Rajiv Prasad Shaha, was the managing director of the Trust.

The institute is the first residential girls' school in the region. The school introduced Higher Secondary Examination in 1962. But the HSC section closed in 1973, and reopened in 1983. In 2013, the school had approximately 1000 students and 60 teachers.

Apart from regular studies, students at the school take an active part in cultural activities, particularly in physical training. The school is nationally renowned for its unique physical training offered to its students. Each year students are invited by the government to perform in the holiday celebrations and important national festivals in Dhaka.

The school provides education and training in computer literacy and also runs an English Language Club, a Science Club, a Debating Club and a unit of the Bishwo Shahitto Kendro. In 1997, Bharateswari Homes had formed Girls-in-Scout, which is the largest children's organization in Bangladesh.

== Administration ==
Principals

- Joya Pati (1954–1965)
- Protibha Mutsuddi (1965–1998)
- Monika Devi Barua (2010, 2012)
- Md Anowarul Haque (2019)
- Troyee Barua (2021)
- Mandira Chowdhury (2023)

== Notable alumni ==
- Aruna Biswas, television and film actress
