= Nazmun Nesa Peyari =

Bangladeshi writer and journalist

- নাজমুন নেসা পিয়ারি
- Born: 1955 (age 70–71)
- Occupation: Writer

Nazmun Nesa Peyari is a Bangladeshi writer and journalist. In recognition of her contribution in language and literature, the government of Bangladesh awarded her the country's second highest civilian award Ekushey Padak in 2020.

== Early life ==
Piari holds a master's degree in biochemistry from Dhaka University. completing her education, joined the Siddheswari college as a teacher. Later she taught at Eden Women's College for some time. She started writing regularly in newspapers from 1980.

== Career ==
Piari joined DW Bengali division in 1976 as a journalist. After working in the Bengali department for three years, she also worked in the German and English departments. In 1990, she became the first foreigner to join DW as editor of marketing and public relations. After working in this department in 2003, she moved to Berlin. In 2005, her first translated book, Piano Teacher, was published. It was originally written by Nobel prize winning writer Elfriede Jellinek. As of November 2019, she has translated four books.
