= Rahat Khan =

Bangladeshi author (1940–2020)

- রাহাত খান
- Born: 18 December 1940; Kishoreganj District, Bengal Presidency, British India
- Died: 28 August 2020 (aged 79); Dhaka, Bangladesh
- Education: University of Dhaka
- Occupations: Journalist, litterateur
- Years active: 1964–2020
- Known for: Editor of The Daily Ittefaq
- Awards: full list

Rahat Khan (19 December 1940 – 28 August 2020) was a Bangladeshi journalist and litterateur. He wrote more than 32 novels. He won Bangla Academy Literary Award in 1973 and Ekushey Padak in 1996 by the Government of Bangladesh.

== Early life ==
Khan was born on 19 December 1940 in Kishoreganj. He wrote his first story as a student in class three. In his words, "One day a kite pounced on a small tortoise before our eyes. The event shocked me very much and made me tearful. I don't know why but I wrote a story on it and thus my authorial life began." Khan completed a degree in economics and philosophy at Ananda Mohan College. He earned his MA from the Department of Bangla Language and Literature at the University of Dhaka in 1961. For the next eight years he taught Bangla at various colleges, including Jagannath College in Dhaka.

== Career ==
In 1969, Khan joined the Bangla-language daily newspaper The Daily Ittefaq as assistant editor. He would spend over four decades at the paper, eventually becoming its editor.

In 1972, Khan published his first collection of short stories, Onischito Lokaloy (Uncertain Human Habitation). The following year he received the Bangla Academy Literary Award for his short stories. He produced further volumes: Ontohin Jatra (The Eternal Journey), Bhalo Monder Taka (Money for Good and Evil), and in 1983, Apel Songbad (News of the Apple). In the early 1980s he published his debut novel, Omol Dhobol Chakri (Milk-White Service). He continued writing novels into the 1990s.

After leaving Ittefaq, Khan served as an advisory editor of Dainik Bartoman and served on the board of directors of the national news agency, Bangladesh Sangbad Sangstha (BSS). In March 2016, he was appointed to a 2 1/2-year term as chairman of the board of BSS.

== Themes ==
The middle and upper class life observed in his novels comes out of urban Dhaka society, while novels such as Omol Dhobol Chakri explore village life.

Khan also considered Ekushe February and the Bangladeshi Liberation War in works such as Hey Matoh Bong and Hey Mohasunyota.

== Novels ==
- Omol Dhobol Chakuri (Milk-White Service, 1982)
- Ek Priyodorshini (A Beautiful Woman, 1983)
- Chayadompoti (A Shadow Couple, 1984)
- Sangharsha (Clash, 1984)
- Shahar (The City, 1984)
- Hey Onanter Pakhi (O, Bird of Infinity, 1989)
- Modhyomather Khelowar (The Forward Footballer, 1991)
- Akhanksha (Desire)
- Kayekjan (A Few Persons)
- Ognidaho (Conflagration)

== Awards ==
- Bangla Academy Literary Award (1973) in the short story category
- Sufi Motahar Hossain Award (1979)
- Mahbubullah Zebunnesa Trust Award (1979)
- Abul Mansur Memorial Award (1980)
- Humayun Qadir Memorial Award (1982)
- Shuhrid Literary Award (1975)
- Trayi Literary Award (1988)
- Cetana Literary Award (1989)
- Ekushey Padak (1996)
