= Tagore sculpture controversy =

2023 incident in Dhaka University, Bangladesh

Tagore Sculpture Controversy
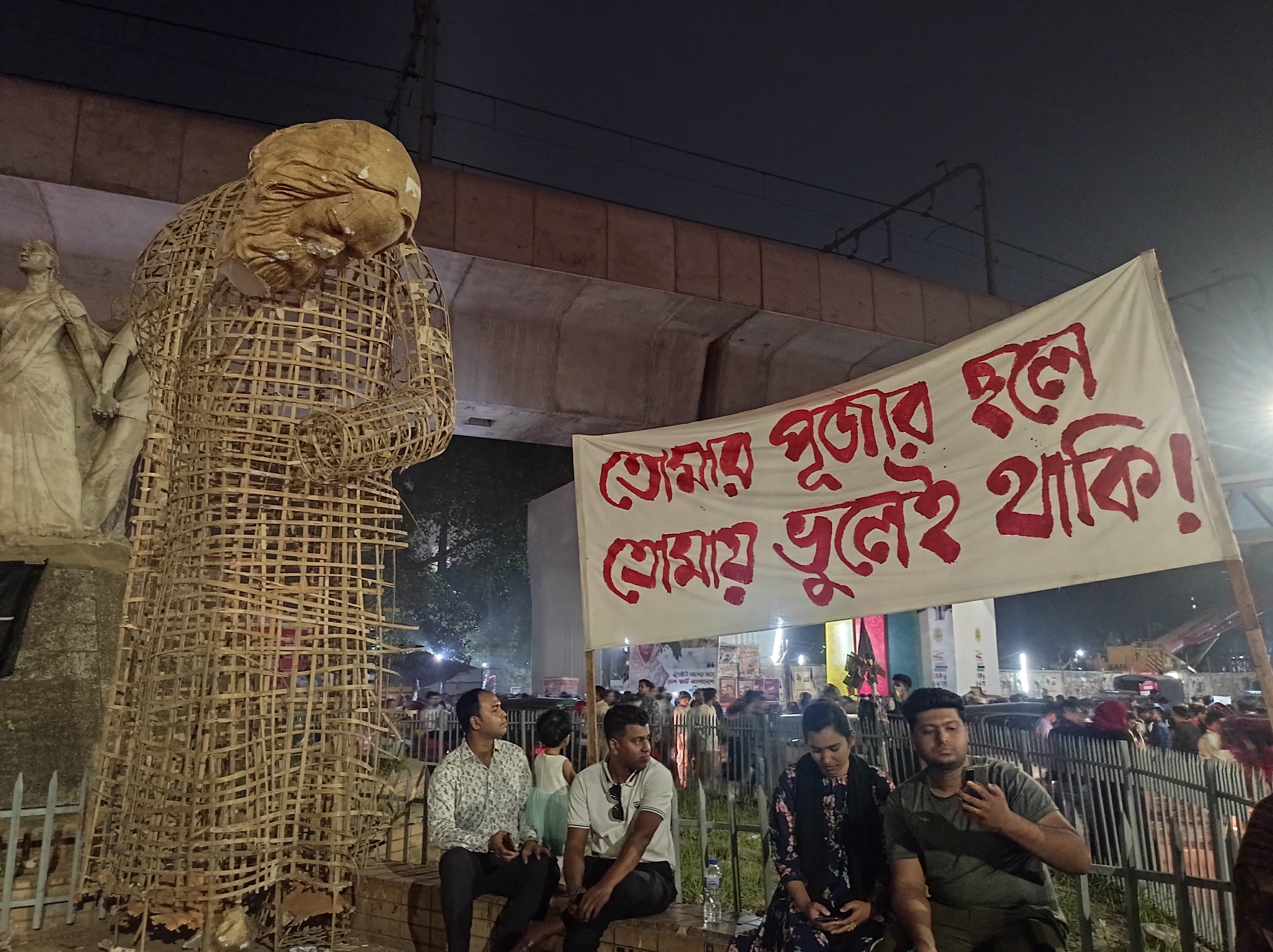
- Reinstated sculpture of Rabindranath Tagore in TSC, University of Dhaka
- Native name: রবীন্দ্রনাথ ঠাকুরের ভাস্কর্য বিতর্ক
- Date: 14–22 February 2023
- Venue: Teacher-Student Centre, University of Dhaka
- Location: Dhaka, Bangladesh; 23.732409°N 90.395522°E
- Cause: Removal of Rabindranath Tagore's temporary sculpture

Tagore Sculpture Controversy was an incident in the campus area of Dhaka University, Bangladesh. On 14 February 2023, a temporary sculpture of Rabindranath Tagore was installed there by some student to make people aware of various issues in the country. But the university authority silently removed it and later showed the reason of installing without taking prior permission. Later, the broken pieces of the sculpture were found in a shed near the campus, drawing criticism from the authority.

== Background ==
On 14 February 2023, during the Ekushey Book Fair, the students of the faculty of Fine Arts, University of Dhaka, installed a sculpture of Rabindranath Tagore was in front of the Anti Terrorism Raju Memorial Sculpture at Teacher-Student Centre. Bangladesh Students Union and leftist student organisations helped them to build this sculpture. The students planned to show the sculpture for the whole month. The face of Rabindranath's sculpture was closed with tape. Besides, there was a nail stuck in the book of Gitanjali in his hand. The Bangla Academy did not want to allow the publisher to open their stall at the book fair in the same year because of the three books. The Film Censor Board was delaying the clearance of Shonibar Bikel. On the other hand, there have been allegations of arresting and torturing journalists in the country using the Digital Security Act, 2018. This sculpture was erected as a protest against these reasons. They wanted to show that how important freedom of expression was for the public by displaying this sculpture. When asked why Rabindranath Tagore was chosen as the symbol of the protest, Shimul Kumbhakar, president of the DU assembly of the Bangladesh students union, told Bdnews24.com, "Rabindranath is the proverbial man of our culture and free thinking or creativity. We can call him an idol. Since free thinking and Creativity is stifled, that's why we chose Rabindranath."

== The incident ==
In 16 February, Shimul Kumbhakar came to the campus in the morning and saw that the sculpture was not in place. The students who installed the sculpture began to suspect that someone had removed the sculpture. They hoisted a banner in front of the Anti Terrorism Raju Memorial Sculpture to protest against the sculpture removal. The banner read "Gum Hoye Gechen Robindronath!" (lit. 'Rabindranath is missing!'). After the removal of the incident went viral and their deed was criticized, the university authority said that they have removed the sculpture.

The day after the sculpture was removed, some passers-by found the broken pieces of the sculpture towards Suhrawardy Udyan. After they took photographs of the broken pieces and shared them on social media, the students came to know and recovered the broken parts. The students assembled the broken parts of the sculpture and installed it at its original location on February 18 and hung two banners on either side of it. A banner read "Repeal the Digital Security Act and stop all forms of censorship". The university proctor termed the installation of a defaced statue of a venerable figure like Rabindranath as "degenerate culture", while another banner read "We have forgotten you under the guise of your venerability".

However, although the pieces of the sculpture were put back together, its head was tilted and its state of disrepair was visible. As a result it was removed by students on 22 February.

== Reactions ==
AKM Golam Rabbani, the proctor of the university, felt that permission should have been taken from the authority before installing the sculpture. Terming the installation of another sculpture next to Raju's as "degenerate culture", he said the students had insulted Rabindranath Tagore by defacing it. According to him, the students made the sculpture in deep darkness which is suspicious. He termed the banners hanging next to the sculpture as "banner terror". According to the university authority, the students who erected the sculpture have other motive. Students, on the other hand, feel that the authority removed the statue to please the government.

A. S. M. Abdur Rab, the president of Jatiya Samajtantrik Dal-JSD, criticized the authority in a party statement saying that throwing the broken head of Rabindranath Tagore's sculpture in the garbage heap at Suhrawardy Udyan was not a sign of respect for the poet. He and the party's general secretary Shaheed Uddin Mahmud Swapan compared the incident with the Bengali language movement and said that if the activists had followed the law in protest, the Central Shaheed Minar would not have been built today. At that time the authority demolished the Shaheed Minar, but later they lost power in East Pakistan. The Dhaka University branch of the Bangladesh Students Union said in a published statement that the university authority had taken a stand against freedom of speech by removing the sculpture.

Syed Anwar Husain compared the situation with Pakistan and said,

"Rabindranath is the only poet, who is universal. He spoke for all the people of the world. If the sculpture of Rabindranath is removed from the university of Dhaka, then I am bound to say - Bangladesh has returned to the Pakistani era. I am very angry. Hearing the news. None of the promises of Bangladesh's liberation war are left now. The removal of the sculpture of Rabindranath is proof of this. This has been done with the consent of the university authority."

Mum Rahman said that she is against erecting a sculpture at someone's place without taking permission. But, according to her, the current situation of Bangladesh has been reflected in this incident. Disagreeing with the proctor's reply, Raju Alauddin questioned that since the university was a place of protest, there was no question of seeking permission from the authority to erect the sculpture for the purpose of a just protest. However he thinks that Tagore haters may be responsible for this incident. Hamiduzzaman Khan thinks that instead of removing the sculpture, the authority could discuss with students.

According to journalist Farooq Wasif, the sculpture did not succeed as a language of protest, because Rabindranath Tagore as a symbol of protest is inconsistent in this era. According to Mahbub Morshed, the sculpture contained a message for Rabindra devotees and there is a significance behind the sculptures' disappearance.

According to Ajoy Dasgupta, Rabindranath is being used as a tool by the Leftist organizations in the name of free thought to provide support to the Bangladesh Nationalist Party.
