= Nuran Nabi =

Bangladeshi scientist and author (born 1949)

- নুরুন নবী
- Born: 1949; Tangail, East Bengal
- Occupation: scientist

Nuran Nabi (born 1949) is a Bangladeshi scientist and author. In recognition of his contribution in language and literature, the government of Bangladesh awarded him the country's second highest civilian award Ekushey Padak in 2020. He received honorary 'Fellowship' from Bangla Academy in 2017.

== Early life ==
Nuran Nabi was born in 1949 in the village of Khamarrpara in Gopalpur of Tangail of the then East Bengal (now Bangladesh). He completed secondary school certificate from the local Hemnagar Sashimukhi High School and higher secondary school certificate from Ananda Mohan College. He graduated in biochemistry from the University of Dhaka and obtained his PhD degree from Kyushu University in Japan. He then received a post-doctoral degree in microbiology from the New York University.

== Career ==
Nuran Nabi joined Colgate-Palmolive as a researcher. He has more than 50 patents in his name.
