= March 2023 Rajshahi University unrest =

Event of clashes and protests in Rajshahi, Bangladesh

- March 2023 clashes in Binodpur, Rajshahi; Part of student unrests in Bangladesh
- Date: 11 March 2023 – 13 March 2023
- Location: Matihar: Binodpur; Rajshahi University; Rajshahi, Bangladesh; 24°22′N 88°38′E
- Caused by: Argument between a university student and bus authority regarding bus fare
- Result: Withdrawal of protests by students–: Two cases filled and investigation regarding the unrest; Suspension of institutional activities of Rajshahi University for two days; Temporary blockage and closure of Rajshahi-Dhaka Highway; Interruption in Rail activities near Rajshahi

Parties
Rajshahi University students: Bangladesh Chhatra League	Government of Bangladesh; Bangladesh Police; Rapid Action Battalion; RMP; SWAT; Border Guard Bangladesh	Local businessmen

Number
~500	~1000	~250

Casualties
- Injuries: ~300 (Note: At least 89 admitted to hospital, 2 among them are in critical condition. The rest sustained minor injuries.)
- Arrested: 1
- Location of the University of Rajshahi (Rajshahi Division map)

On the evening of 11 March 2023, clashes between students of Rajshahi University and local businesspersons occurred in Binodpur on the outskirts of the university campus in Rajshahi, Bangladesh. The clashes started over a mere issue of argument about bus fare between a university student and bus authority- where locals got engaged. The clashes injured hundreds of students, meanwhile, dozens of vendors were burnt along with the local police post. The clashes were later surpassed by law-enforcement agencies around midnight. Traffic was closed on the Rajshahi-Dhaka Highway and rail communication was interrupted due to students' blockade.

The next day, students of the university staged protests regarding the clashes. They sieged and locked up the university's major administrative buildings and announced not to end the movement until their demands are met. Journalists were also attacked while covering the protests. Rajshahi's rail communication was closed again after the students vandalized railtrack. Although, the protests later became subsided and RU's VC Golam Shabbir Sattar announced the withdrawal of protests by students in a press conference on 13 March.

Rajshahi University closed classes for two days due to the unrest. Meanwhile, peaceful movements continued, and it later became clear how the involvement of the Chhatra League in the incident provoked the unrest.
