= 2023 Kutupalong refugee camp fire =

Incident in Bangladesh

- Date: 5 March 2023
- Location: Kutupalong refugee camp, Bangladesh; 21.184°N 92.156°E

On 5 March 2023, a fire began in the Kutupalong refugee camp in southeast Bangladesh, resulting in the destruction of more than 2,000 shelters and the displacement of 12,000 refugees.

== Background ==
The Kutupalong refugee camp is considered the world's largest refugee camp, sheltering Rohingya refugees from Myanmar. Between January 2021 and December 2022, there were more than 222 fire incidents in the camp, including 60 incidents of arson.

== Fire ==
The fire began on 5 March 2023 at 2.45 pm in the Balukhali camp in Cox's Bazar, destroying more than 2,000 shelters, many made of bamboo and tarpaulin, after spreading through gas cylinders in kitchens. Volunteers and local firefighting services brought the fire under control within three hours.

== Impact ==
No casualties were reported. More than 12,000 refugees from Myanmar were left without shelter due to the fire. 35 mosques and 21 learning centres for refugees were also destroyed.
