= Bikiran Prasad Barua =

Bangladeshi physicist (1945–2023)

- বিকিরণ প্রসাদ বড়ুয়া
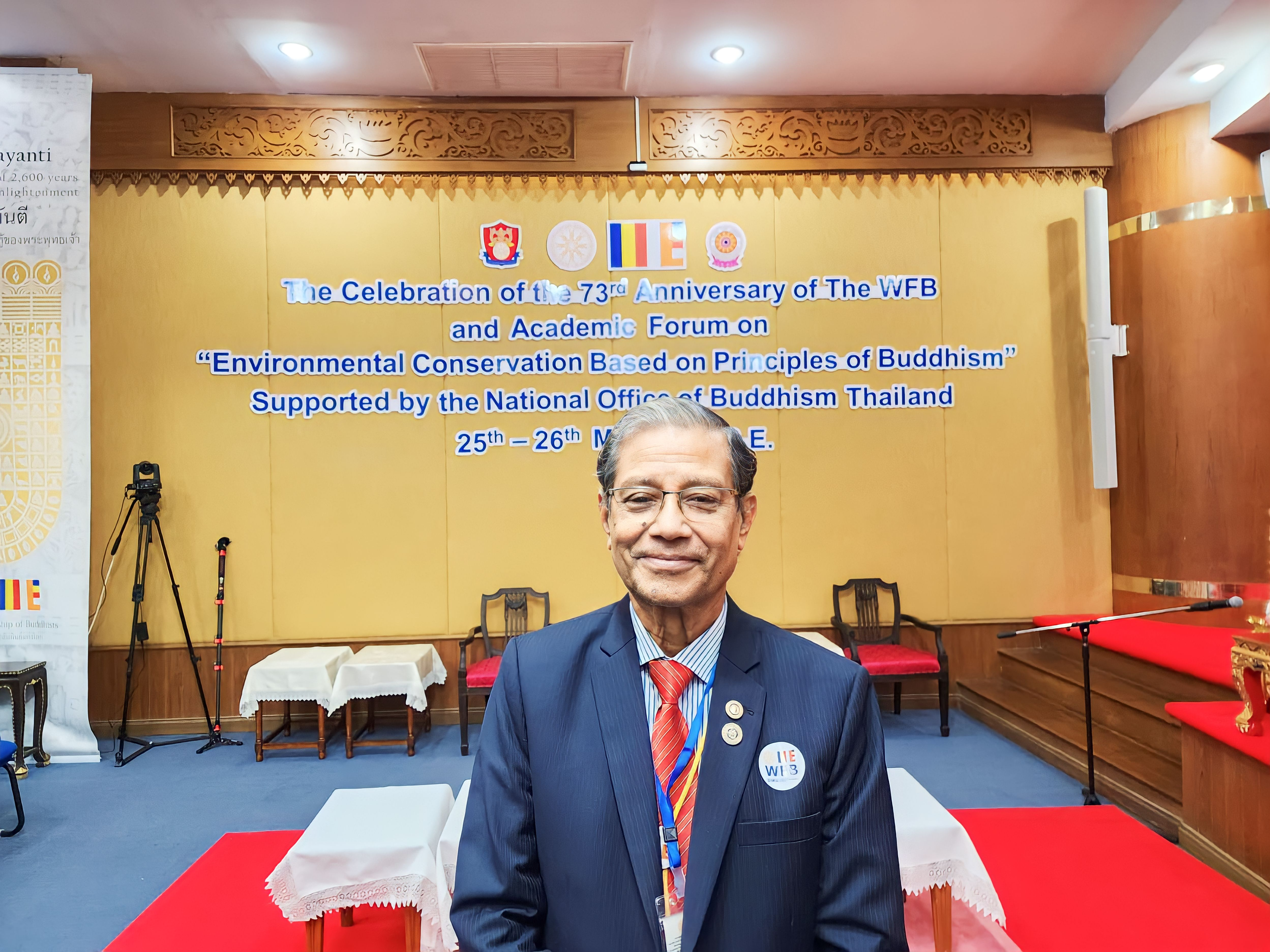
- Born: 11 February 1945; Chittagong, Bengal Province, British India
- Died: 17 August 2023 (aged 78); Dhaka, Bangladesh
- Occupations: Physicist, academic

Bikiran Prasad Barua (11 February 1945 – 17 August 2023) was a Bangladeshi physicist and educationist. He was chairman of the physics department of the University of Chittagong. In recognition of his contribution in education, the government of Bangladesh awarded him the country's second-highest civilian award Ekushey Padak in 2020.

Barua was born in Chittagong. He was the president of the Bangabandhu Education and Research Council in the Greater Chittagong area. He published 17 research papers on physics. Until death he served as secretary general of Bangladesh Bouddha Kristi Prachar Sangha.

Bikiran Prasad Barua died of cardiac arrest at Lab Aid Hospital in Dhaka, on 17 August 2023, at the age of 79.
