= Fazilatunnesa Bappy =

Bangladeshi lawyer

- ফজিলাতুন্নেসা বাপ্পী
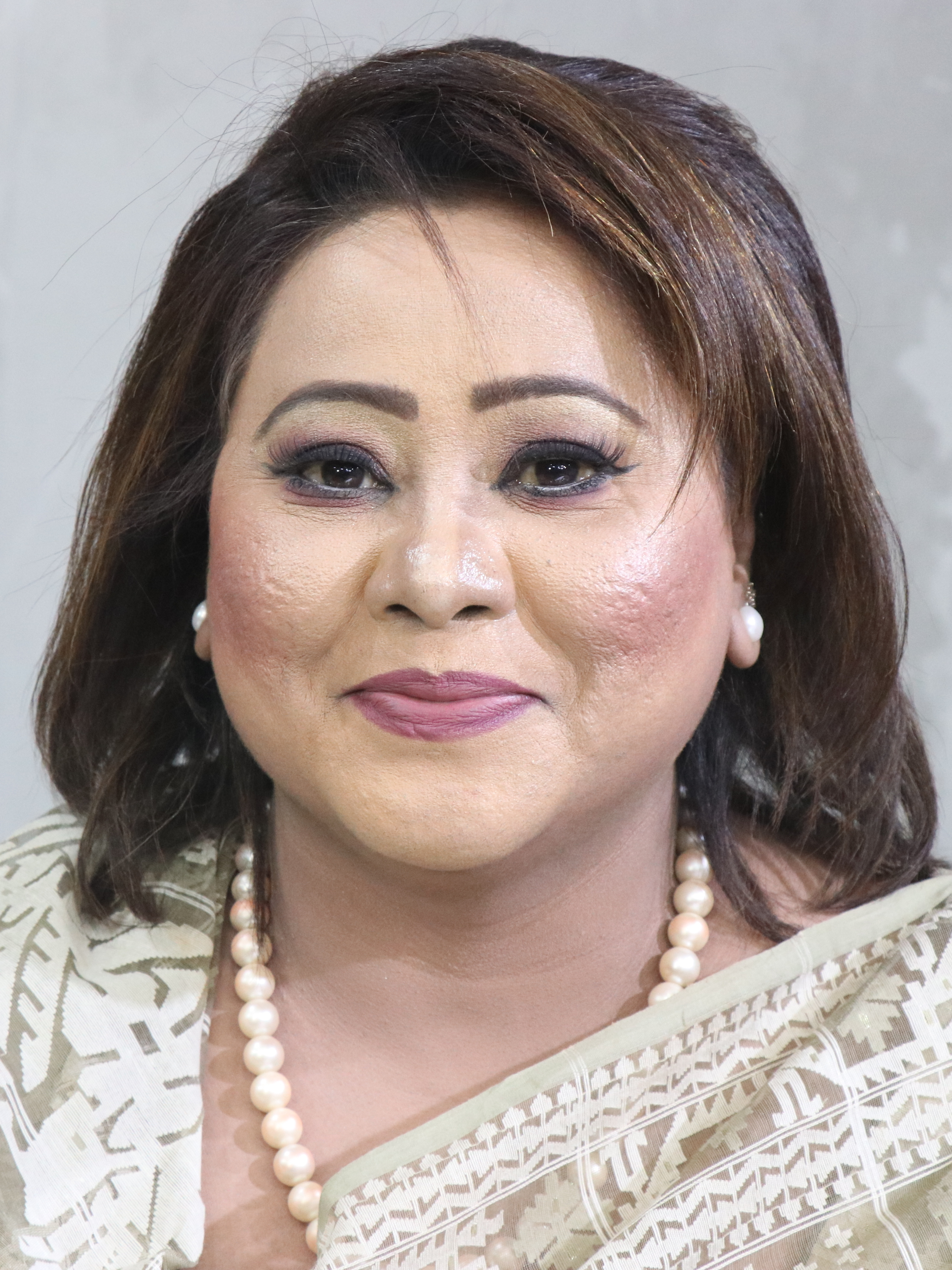
- Bappy in January 2018

Member of the Bangladesh Parliament for Reserved Women's Seat-30
- In office 29 January 2014 – 28 January 2019

Member of the Bangladesh Parliament for Reserved Women's Seat-47
- In office 9 December 2011 – 24 January 2014
- Preceded by: Position created

Personal details
- Born: 31 December 1970 Narail, East Pakistan, Pakistan
- Died: 2 January 2020 (aged 49) Dhaka, Bangladesh
- Party: Bangladesh Awami League
- Occupation: Lawyer, politician

Fazilatunesa Bappy (31 December 1970 – 2 January 2020) was a Bangladeshi lawyer and a politician representing the Bangladesh Awami League party. She was a member of the Jatiya Sangsad.

== Biography ==
Bappy was born on 31 December 1970 in Narail in the then East Pakistan. She served as a prosecutor of the International Crime Tribunal and a deputy attorney general.

Bappy was involved with the politics of Bangladesh Awami League during her student life. She was elected as a member of the Jatiya Sangsad in 2011 and again in 2014.

== Death ==
Bappy died on 2 January 2020 in Bangabandhu Sheikh Mujib Medical University Hospital, Dhaka at the age of 49, suffering from pneumonia.
