= Sunil Dhar =

Bangladeshi classical musician (1933–2020)

Sunil Kumar Dhar সুনীল কুমার ধর
- Born: 28 March 1933; Mymensingh, Bengal Presidency, British India
- Died: 27 August 2020 (aged 87) Mymensingh, Bangladesh

Sunil Kumar Dhar (28 March 1933 – 27 August 2020) was a Bangladeshi classical musician.

== Early life and career ==
Dhar was born in Tarati village, Muktagachha Upazila, Mymensingh District to Akshya Kumar Dhar and Surashibala Dhar.

Dhar took music lessons from Allauddin Khan in 1952. He took lessons on Dhrupad and Dhamar from Ustad Jagadananda Barua. He was a regular performer in Bangladesh Television and Bangladesh Betar. He is the founder principal of Mymensingh Nazrul Academy since 1966 and the president of Dhruba Parishad Mymensingh unit.

== Awards and honors ==
- "Sangeet Bhashkar" title by Dhruba Parishad
- Gold medal from Art Council (1958), Sandipon Sangskritik Sangstha, Bangladesh Nazrul Sangeet Shilpi Parishad and Nazrul Sena, Mymensingh
