= Md Obaidul Kabir Chowdhury =

Bangladeshi physician

- উবায়দুল কবীর চৌধুরী
- Born: Sunamganj District
- Citizenship: Bangladesh
- Occupation: Physician
- Awards: Independence Day Award (2020)

Md Obaidul Kabir Chowdhury is a dermatologist in Bangladesh. He was awarded the Independence Day Award in 2020 for his unique contribution to medicine.

== Career ==
Chowdhury passed MBBS from Dhaka Medical College and Hospital in 1984. He started working at Dhaka Medical College and Hospital. He graduated from the University of Vienna in 1965 with a degree in Dermatology and Venereology. After retirement he was the principal of Samaritan Medical College. Since 2003, he has been working as a Professor in the Department of Dermatology at Holy Family Red Crescent Medical College and Hospital. He was the personal physician of Prime Minister of Bangladesh, Sheikh Hasina.

== Awards ==
Chowdhury was awarded the Independence Day Award, the highest civilian honour, in 2020 for his contribution to the medical field.
