= 2023 Dhaka Bangabazar fire =

Fire disaster in Dhaka, Bangladesh in 2023

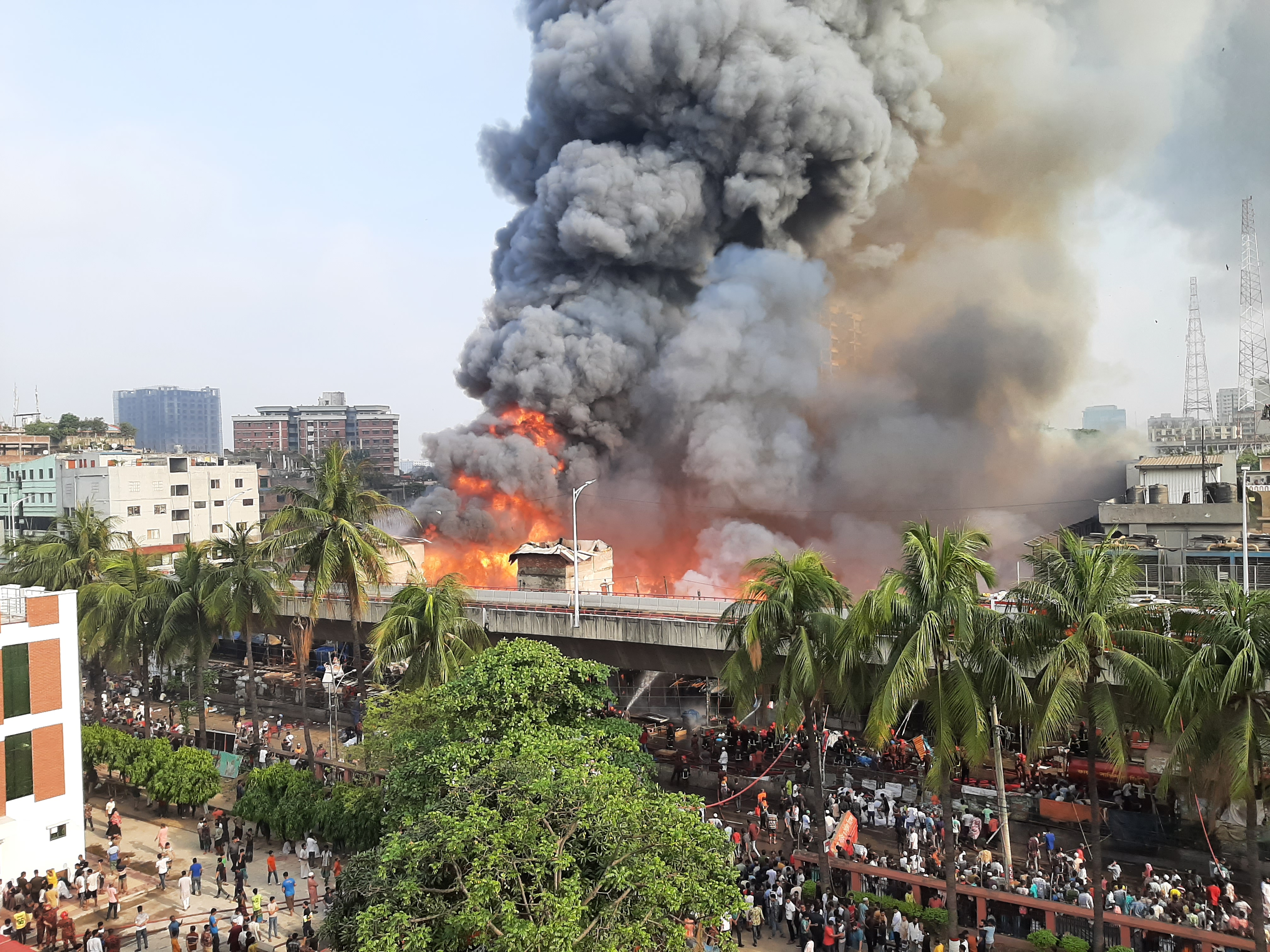

- Bangabazar (Dhaka) Location of Bangabazar in Dhaka
- Date: 4 April 2023
- Duration: 75 hours
- Location: Bangabazar, Dhaka, Bangladesh; 23.7236°N 90.4057°E
- Cause: Burning cigarette or mosquito repellent coil
- Outcome: The market was completely destroyed by the fire
- Injuries: 18
- Property damage: US$28.5 million (official estimate)

On the morning of 4 April 2023, a massive fire erupted in the clothing market of Bangabazar, located in Dhaka, the capital city of Bangladesh. This fire resulted in the utter devastation of the market, leaving thousands of stores destroyed and numerous structures damaged.

== Response ==
The blaze was first reported at 6:10 BST and was brought under control by 12:36 BST, primarily by the Department of Fire Service and Civil Defence, supported by the armed forces of Bangladesh, and various other government and non-government agencies and organizations. However, it took approximately 75 hours to fully extinguish the fire.

== Impact ==
A total of 3,845 stores were destroyed, with other properties damaged. Dhaka South City Corporation estimated the financial loss to be Tk3.03 billion (US$28.5 million). However, local traders estimated the loss amounted to Tk10 billion (US$93.9 million). The incident took place during the Islamic month of Ramadan, which was followed by the festival of Eid al-Fitr, leading to many traders purchasing new clothes using their previous year's earnings. Some vendors were able to move their items to safety during the emergency, but many were unable to salvage anything.

The blaze at the Bangabazar clothing market in Dhaka resulted in injuries to a total of 18 people. Among those injured were 12 firefighters who were hurt while battling the fire and defending the fire service headquarters.

== Violence ==
During the incident, an angry mob of businessmen and locals reportedly attacked the fire service headquarters. The involvement of any third party in the attack is currently being investigated, and it is still unclear whether any external factors contributed to the violence. This incident underscores the importance of maintaining law and order during emergencies and ensuring the safety of emergency personnel, who put their lives at risk to protect others.

== Consequences ==
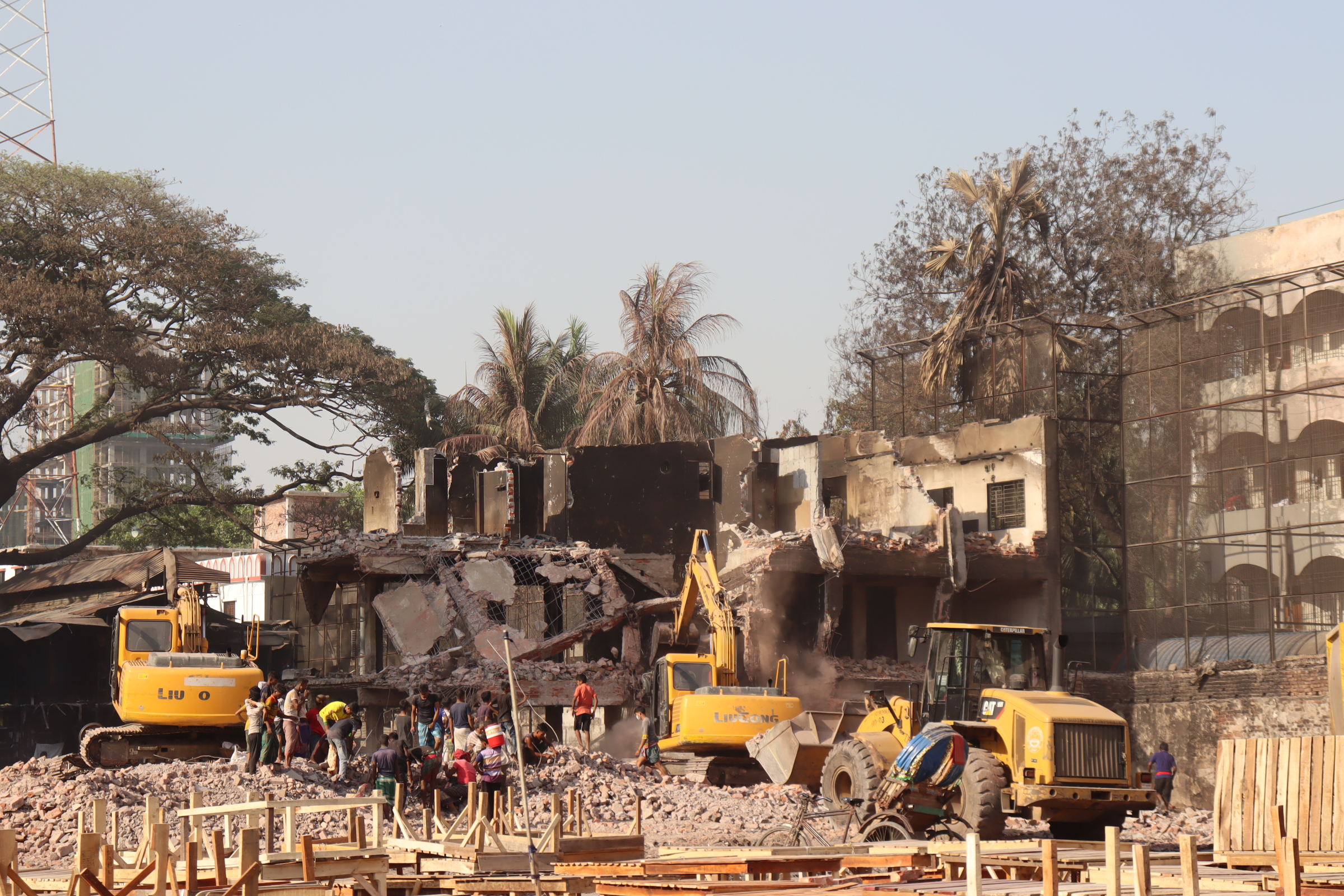
Situation after 2023 Dhaka Bangabazar fire

In response to the fire, the national emergency helpline service '999' was suspended for nine hours. Furthermore, the Mayor Mohammed Hanif flyover, located next to the marketplace, was closed to traffic. The disaster also highlighted the need for improved safety measures in public spaces and marketplaces to prevent such incidents from occurring in the future. The Bangladeshi government and various organizations have pledged to take steps to improve safety in public spaces and marketplaces.

== Efforts ==
This fire disaster is one of the most costly non-fatal incidents ever recorded in Bangladesh's history. It took a team of 600 firefighters from across the Dhaka city, along with a record 48 units of the fire service, six hours to bring the fire under control, and approximately 75 hours to fully extinguish it. The efforts of the firefighters and other emergency personnel, as well as the support of various government and non-governmental agencies and organizations, were instrumental in containing the fire and preventing further damage.
