= Saifur Rahman Nizami =

Bangladeshi Islamic scholar

Syed Mohammad Saifur Rahman Nizami
- সৈয়দ মোহাম্মদ ছাইফুর রহমান নিজামী
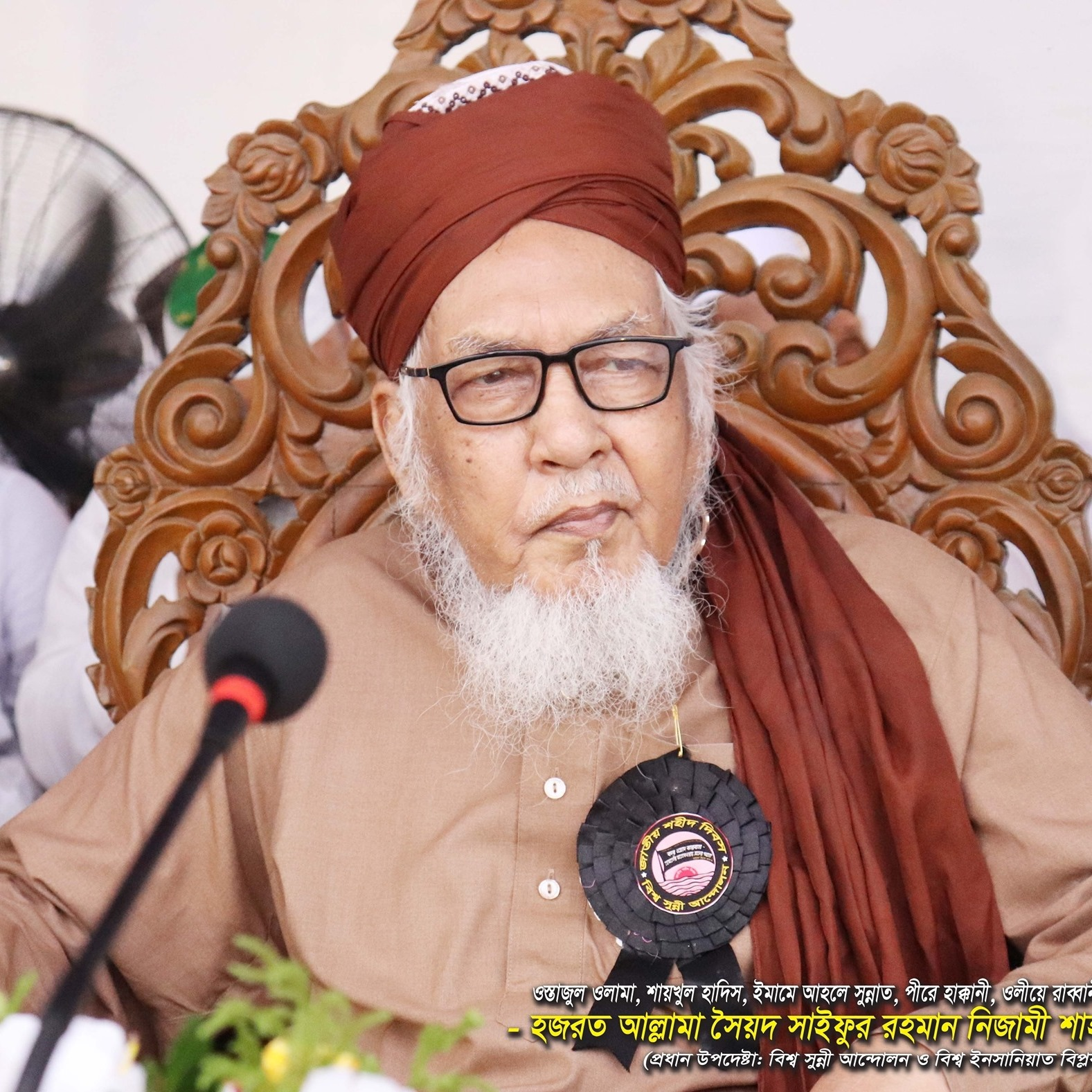
- Nizami in 2025

Personal life
- Born: 1916 (age 109–110) Chittagong District, Bengal Presidency, British India
- Occupation: Islamic scholar

Religious life
- Religion: Islam
- Denomination: Sunni
- Jurisprudence: Hanafi

Muslim leader
- Awards: Ekushey Padak

Syed Mohammad Saifur Rahman Nizami Shah is a Bangladeshi Islamic scholar and researcher of Hadith. He was awarded Ekushey Padak in 2020 by the government of Bangladesh.

== Birth and early life ==
Nizam's father was Syed Shah Golam Rahman Echmati.

== Contributions ==
Following the independence of Bangladesh in 1971, he delivered the first prayer broadcast on Chittagong Radio, a recording of which is preserved in the Chittagong Radio archives. In 1973, he founded a charitable organization named Anjuman-e-Ikhwat-e-Ma'rifat Trust. In 1975, he established the Shah Golam Rahman Orphanage in Mastan Nagar, Mirsarai, and in 1978, he founded Jamea Rahmania Fazil Madrasa. He currently serves as the chief adviser of the World Sunni Movement, Insaniyat Biplob Bangladesh and the World Insaniyat Revolution.
