= MV Morning Bird =

Sunken ferry

MV Morning Bird was a ferry that sunk in the Buriganga River in Dhaka, Bangladesh, with more than 50 passengers on board on 29 June 2020, killing at least 34 people. The incident took place at around 9:30 am local time near Shyambazar area after being hit by another launch Mayur-2. During the incident the Morning Bird was heading toward the Port of Dhaka, Sadarghat from Munshiganj.
