= List of Bangladeshi playback singers =

The following is a list of Bangladeshi playback singers:

== Male ==
- Mainul Ahsan Noble ( Noble Man)
- Abdul Alim
- S.I. Tutul
- Pritom Ahmed
- Shafin Ahmed
- Asif Akbar
- Rafiqul Alam (singer)
- Robi Chowdhury
- Fakir Alamgir
- Ali Hossain
- Fazlur Rahman Babu
- Ayub Bachchu
- Shyam Sundar Baishnab
- Balam
- Biplob
- Partha Barua
- Kumar Bishwajit
- Saidur Rahman Boyati
- Tapan Chowdhury
- Shuvro Dev
- Fuad al Muqtadir
- Syed Abdul Hadi
- Haider Hussain
- Abdul Jabbar
- James
- Azam Khan
- Tahsan Khan
- Monir Khan
- Khurshid Alam
- Kaderi Kibria
- Andrew Kishore
- Imran Mahmudul
- Bappa Mazumder
- Khalid Hassan Milu
- Kazi Shuvo
- Muhin
- Jolly Mukherjee
- Mahmudun Nabi
- Subir Nandi
- Khan Ataur Rahman
- Minar Rahman
- Indra Mohan Rajbongshi
- Rathindranath Roy
- Kiran Chandra Roy
- Arfin Rumey
- Sadi Mohammad
- Emon Saha
- Abdul Karim Shah
- Kalim Sharafi
- Bari Siddiqui
- Mohammad Ali Siddiqui
- Chandan Sinha
- Topu
- Pritom Hasan
- Ferdous Wahid
- Habib Wahid

== Female ==
- Nina Hamid
- Shammi Akhtar
- Akhi Alomgir
- Anusheh Anadil
- Anjuman Ara Begum
- Ferdous Ara
- Firoza Begum
- Momtaz Begum
- Rezwana Choudhury Bannya
- Samina Chowdhury
- Priyanka Gope
- Mila Islam
- Kanak Chapa
- Elita Karim
- Uma Khan
- Anupama Mukti
- Dilshad Nahar Kona
- Konal
- Krishnokoli
- Runa Laila
- Haimanti Rakshit Das
- Lehat Lemis
- Sania Sultana Liza
- Mehreen Mahmud
- Chandana Mazumdar
- Mitali Mukherjee
- Fahmida Nabi
- Nazmun Munira Nancy
- Baby Naznin
- Oyshee
- Farida Parveen
- Sabrina Porshi
- Ferdausi Rahman
- Shahnaz Rahmatullah
- Rizia Parveen
- Meher Afroz Shaon
- Shithi Saha
- Kangalini Sufia
- Abida Sultana
- Tishma
- Farida Yasmin
- Nilufar Yasmin
- Sabina Yasmin
- Shimul Yousuf
- Shakila Zafar
- Fatema Tuz Zohra
- Shayan

== See also ==
- List of Bangladeshi musicians
- List of Bangladeshi music producers
