= Sangram (1974 film) =

1974 Bangladeshi film

- Theatrical release poster
- Original title: সংগ্রাম
- Directed by: Chashi Nazrul Islam
- Screenplay by: Kazi Aziz Ahmed
- Based on: Personal Diary by Khaled Mosharraf
- Produced by: Kazi Sobuz
- Starring: Khasru; Shuchanda; Nuton; Hasan Imam; Darashiko
- Edited by: Bashir Hossain
- Music by: Khandaker Nurul Alam
- Distributed by: Anupam Kathachitra
- Release date: 18 January 1974
- Running time: 97 mins
- Country: Bangladesh
- Language: Bengali

Sangram (lit. 'Struggle') is a Bangladeshi war drama film that was released in 1974. The film was directed by Chashi Nazrul Islam and produced by Kazi Sobuz. Its story is based on true events Khaled Mosharraf wrote in a diary; it depicts the East Bengal Regiment's battles against the Pakistan army and the contribution of Bengali armies to Bangladesh's war of liberation.

== Plot ==
During the non-cooperation movement in 1971, people are marching in the streets of East Pakistan in protests against the country's military junta. At his home, Captain Asad of the Pakistan Army is arguing about the country's future with his sister and her friend. Several days later, Captain Asad and some armies from East Bengal Regiment go to talk with Major Hassan; they learn the Pakistani army has started distrusting Bengali officials. Large numbers of troops are coming from West Pakistan to East Pakistan, which is a sign of danger, and troops of Punjab Regiment are strengthening their area's security system.

An officer of the Punjab Regiment, on the pretext of the presence of Naxalites, sends a section of the East Bengal Regiment to Shamserganj, far from Chittagong Cantonment, and orders them to remain there. Senior Pakistan Army officials order the return of arms to the Bengali troops. The Bengalis reject this order. Realizing the Pakistanis will soon attack them, the Bengali armies revolt and capture the Punjabi regiment troops. After the declaration of Bangladeshi independence, the war of liberation begins. Pakistani troops detain Captain Asad and a soldier but Asad escapes from the local prison.

Pakistani troops searching for Asad arrive at his house with Razakar Daliluddin and snatch his sister's friend Rikta from his mother. Asad returns home and learns everything from his mother. Asad joins with Major Hassan and they conduct a military operation to liberate his village and rescue the tortured Rikta from Pakistani troops. They win the battle. For nine months Asad fights with the freedom fighters and liberate Bangladesh from Pakistan, undergoing many hardships.

== Cast ==
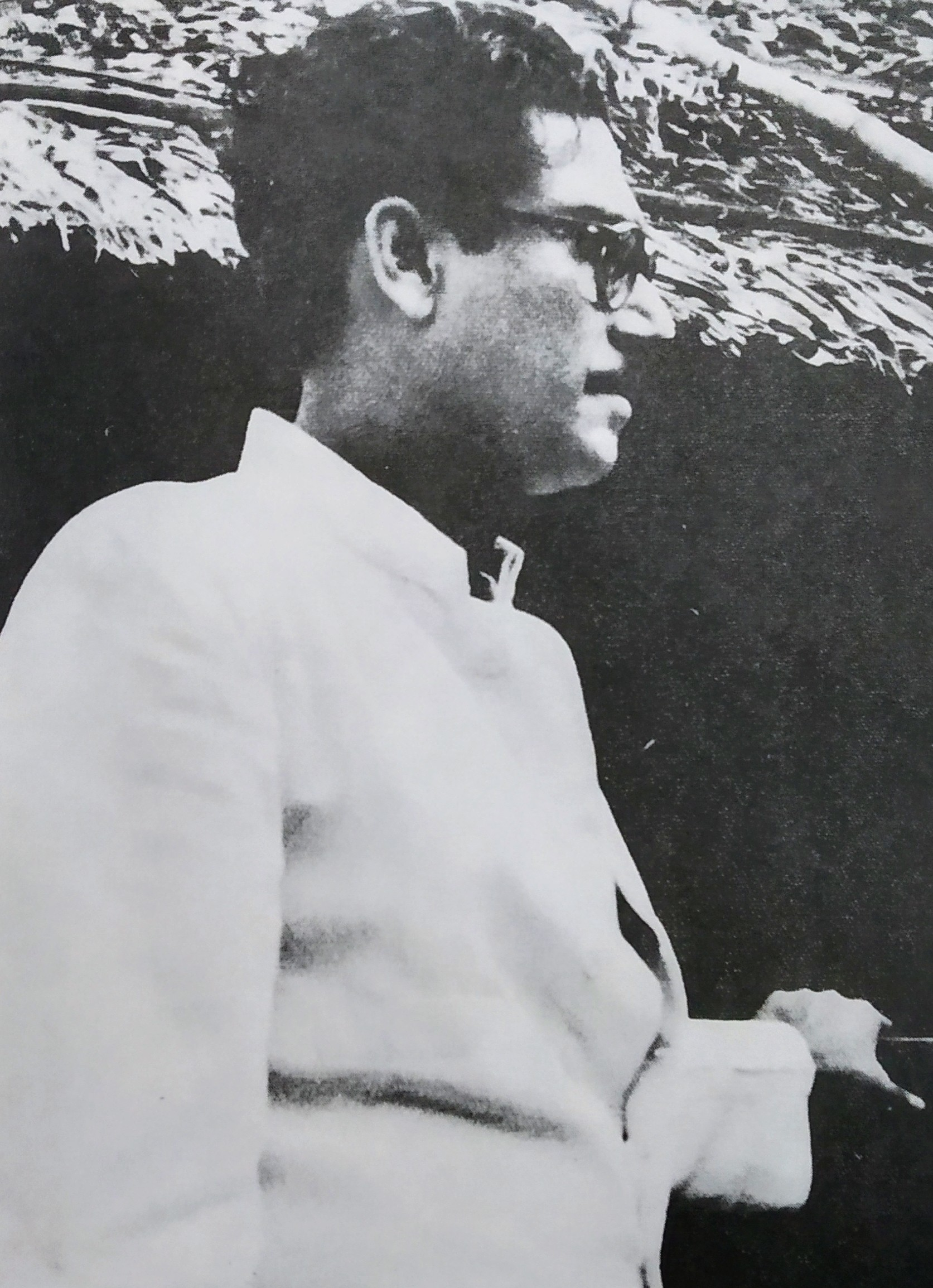
Sheikh Mujibur Rahman

- Darashiko as Major Hassan (Note: The character is based on life of Khaled Mosharraf.)
- Khasru as Captain Asad
- Shuchanda as Mukta, sister of Asad
- Nuton as Rikta, friend of Mukta
- Hasan Imam as Dr Kabir, a doctor in a camp of freedom fighters
- Khalil as a Punjabi officer
- ATM Shamsuzzaman as Daliluddin, a razakar
- Soldiers from Bangladesh Army
- Sheikh Mujibur Rahman (a.k.a. Bangabandhu) as himself (cameo appearance)

== Production ==
The cast of Sangram includes Bangladeshi veterans of the War of Liberation. In the film's final scene, the Bangladesh Army is honoring Sheikh Mujibur Rahman, the first President of Bangladesh, after the country achieved its independence. The filmmaker wanted to cast Rahman in this scene; he and actor Khasru invited Rahman to act in the film but he rejected their initial offer. Khasru later enlisted the help of Abdul Mannan, who persuaded Rahman to appear in the scene.

== Music ==
Sangram

Soundtrack album by Ajit Roy, Abida Sultana, Kaderi Kibria
- Released: 1974
- Genre: Film music
- Language: Bengali
- Producer: Khandaker Nurul Alam

Sangram Soundtrack – Track listing
No.	Title	Lyrics	Singers	Length
1.	"Bicharpoti tomar bichar korbe jara"	Salil Chowdhury	Ajit Roy and Abida Sultana
2.	"Salam Salam Hajar Salam"	Fazal-e-Khuda	Kaderi Kibria

== Reception ==
=== Critical response ===
According to columnist Bidhan Biberu, some scenes in Sangram present the use of religion by enemy as a tactic during the war. Sangram received positive reviews and acclaim. Alamgir Kabir said about the film; "Except in Ora Egarojon and Sangram, most other films appear to use the phenomenon of war time rape as substitute for similar acts when portrayed in a normal commercial Bengali movie". Alamgir also criticized the film, saying due to a lack of experience, the film fails to present the battle scenes in a realistic way. Film critic Chinmoy Mutsuddi has said the film has a number of inconsistent scenes, which have diminished its appeal. According to columnist Nadir Junaid, the film is not unique but was produced like other, ordinary films.

=== Accolades ===
Award	Category	Recipient	Result	Source
Bachsas Awards	Best Actor	Darashiko	Won	
