= List of Bangladeshi musicians =

This is a list of notable Bangladeshi musicians.

== A ==
- Azam Khan
- Altaf Mahmud
- Abdul Ahad
- Abdul Alim
- Abdur Rahman Boyati
- Ahmed Imtiaz Bulbul
- Abed Hossain Khan
- Ali Akbar Khan
- Allauddin Khan
- Abdul Karim Shah
- Abdul Gafur Hali
- Ahmed Fazal
- Ayub Bachchu
- Anwar Pervez

Abdul Jabbar

== B ==
- Bedaruddin Ahmad
- Badal Roy
- Bijoy Sarkar

== D ==
- Dhir Ali Miah
- DJ Rahat

== E ==
- Emon Saha
- Emon Chowdhury

== F ==
- Fuad al Muqtadir

== G ==
- Gul Mohammad Khan

== H ==
- Habib Wahid
- Hamin Ahmed
- Happy Akhand
- Hridoy Khan
- Hyder Husyn

== I ==
- Iqbal Asif Jewel
- Imran Mahmudul
- Imran Rahman

== J ==
- James

== K ==
- Khandaker Nurul Alam
- Kamal Dasgupta
- Khoda Box
- Kazi Shuvo
- Kazi Nazrul Islam

== L ==
- Lucky Akhand

== M ==
- Mohammad Moniruzzaman
- Mujib Pardeshi
- Mumtaz Ali Khan
- Mumzy Stranger

== P ==
- Partha Barua
- Pritom Hasan

== R ==
- Robi Chowdhury
- Radharaman Dutta
- Rathindranath Roy

== S ==
- Sajib Das
- Samar Das
- Sudhin Das
- Shah Abdul Karim
- Shahadat Hossain Khan
- Subir Nandi
- Shafin Ahmed
- Shishir Ahmed
- Bassbaba Sumon
- Sunil Dhar

== T ==
- Tahsan Rahman Khan
- Tanzir Tuhin
- Topu

== Z ==
- Zulfiqer Russell
- Ziaur Rahman Zia

== See also ==
- List of Bangladeshi playback singers
- List of Bangladeshi music producers
