= Kothay Amar Neel Doriya =

- Album cover

Studio album by Abdul Jabbar
- Released: 12 April 2017
- Recorded: 2008–2009
- Genre: Modern
- Length: 41.49
- Language: Bengali
- Label: Mom Music Center
- Director: Md Golam Sarwar
- Producer: Md Amirul Islam
- Compiler: Md Amirul Islam

Kothay Amar Neel Doriya (Bengali: কোথায় আমার নীল দরিয়া) is the first and only album of Bangladeshi singer and Swadhin Bangla Betar Kendra artiste Mohammed Abdul Jabbar. The album contains nine basic songs, which are written by lyricist Md Amirul Islam and composed by Md Golam Sarwar.

== Background ==
The musical work of the album began in 2008. A patriotic song termed Ekhane Amar Padma Meghna written by lyricist Md Amirul Islam, was recorded in the voice of singer Abdul Jabbar to air on Bangladesh Television. Being fascinated by the song, artiste Abdul Jabbar expressed his desire to make an album to lyricist Amirul Islam. As per the artiste's direction, lyricist Amirul Islam wrote the rest of the songs for album and music director Md Golam Sarwar composed them. The album was released online in 2017 due to various complications although it was finished in 2009. Since recording almost all the songs of the album, specially the song Ekhane Amar Padma Meghna, are broadcast on various private TV channels including Bangladesh Television.

== Naming ==
The album was initially titled Maa Amar Masjid Maa Amar Mandir. Later, the album was named Kothay Amar Neel Doriya after Abdul Jabbar's most popular song Ore Neel Doriya Amay De Re De Chhariya.

== Track listing ==
SL. No.	Title	Lyricist	Music director	Genre/Class	Singer	Notes/Sang for
1	Ami Apon Gharer Janlam Na Khabor	Md Amirul Islam	Md Golam Sarwar	Modern/Folk	Abdul Jabbar	Title song
2	Maa Amar Masjid Maa Amar Mandir	Md Amirul Islam	Md Golam Sarwar	Modern/Folk	Abdul Jabbar	
3	Ekhane Amar Padma Meghna	Md Amirul Islam	Md Golam Sarwar	Modern/Folk	Abdul Jabbar	
4	Noyone Mekho Na Kajol	Md Amirul Islam	Md Golam Sarwar	Modern/Folk	Abdul Jabbar	
5	Premer Bishkanta Bindhecche Amay	Md Amirul Islam	Md Golam Sarwar	Modern/Folk	Abdul Jabbar	
6	Ami Dukkho Ke Bolecchi Aro Dukkho Diye	Md Amirul Islam	Md Golam Sarwar	Modern/Folk	Abdul Jabbar	
7	Make Tomader Bhalo Na Lagleo	Md Amirul Islam	Md Golam Sarwar	Modern/Folk	Abdul Jabbar	
