= 1981 in Bangladesh =

- Centuries: 20th; 21st
- Decades: 1960s; 1970s; 1980s; 1990s; 2000s
- See also: Other events of 1981; List of years in Bangladesh

1981 (MCMLXXXI) was a common year starting on Thursday of the Gregorian calendar, the 1981st year of the Common Era (CE) and Anno Domini (AD) designations, the 981st year of the 2nd millennium, the 81st year of the 20th century, and the 2nd year of the 1980s decade.

The year 1981 was the 10th year after the independence of Bangladesh. It was also the last year of the Government of Ziaur Rahman and the first year of the Government of President Abdus Sattar

== Incumbents ==
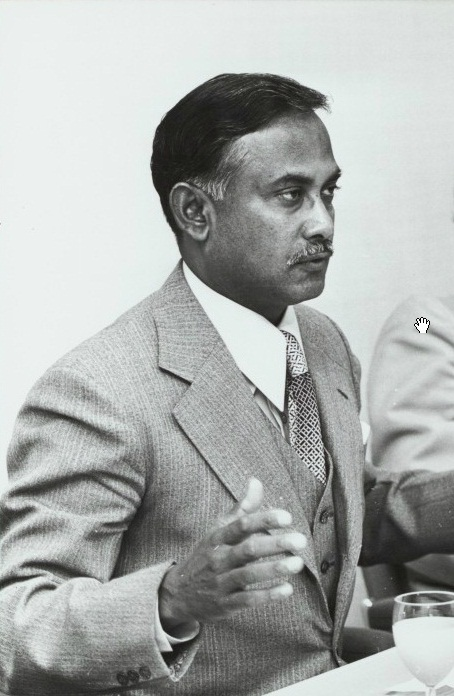
Ziaur
Rahman

- President: Ziaur Rahman (until 30 May), Abdus Sattar (starting 30 May)
- Prime Minister: Shah Azizur Rahman
- Vice President: Abdus Sattar (until May); Mirza Nurul Huda (starting 24 November)
- Chief Justice: Kemaluddin Hossain

== Demography ==
Demographic Indicators for Bangladesh in 1981
Population, total	81,767,516
Population density (per km^{2})	628.2
Population growth (annual %)	2.6%
Male to Female Ratio (every 100 Female)	106.3
Urban population (% of total)	15.8%
Birth rate, crude (per 1,000 people)	42.5
Death rate, crude (per 1,000 people)	14.1
Mortality rate, under 5 (per 1,000 live births)	194
Life expectancy at birth, total (years)	53.4
Fertility rate, total (births per woman)	6.2

== Climate ==
Climate data for Bangladesh in 1981
Month	Jan	Feb	Mar	Apr	May	Jun	Jul	Aug	Sep	Oct	Nov	Dec	Year
Daily mean °C (°F)	18.4 (65.1)	20.7 (69.3)	24.2 (75.6)	25.7 (78.3)	27.1 (80.8)	28.5 (83.3)	27.7 (81.9)	28.5 (83.3)	27.9 (82.2)	27.2 (81.0)	23.4 (74.1)	19.1 (66.4)	24.9 (76.8)
Average precipitation mm (inches)	23.7 (0.93)	28.7 (1.13)	81.5 (3.21)	396.3 (15.60)	277.8 (10.94)	328.8 (12.94)	750.8 (29.56)	351.7 (13.85)	287.9 (11.33)	23. (0.9)	2.5 (0.10)	46.2 (1.82)	2,598.8 (102.31)
Source: Climatic Research Unit (CRU) of University of East Anglia (UEA)

== Economy ==
Key Economic Indicators for Bangladesh in 1981
National Income
	Current US$	Current BDT	% of GDP
GDP	$20.2 billion	BDT330.9 billion	
GDP growth (annual %)	7.2%		
GDP per capita	$247.6	BDT4,047	
Agriculture, value added	$6.5 billion	BDT105.7 billion	32.0%
Industry, value added	$4.0 billion	BDT65.5 billion	19.8%
Services, etc., value added	$9.3 billion	BDT151.2 billion	45.7%
Balance of Payment
	Current US$	Current BDT	% of GDP
Current account balance	-$1,016.6 million		-5.0%
Imports of goods and services	$2,898.3 million	BDT46.7 billion	14.1%
Exports of goods and services	$1,001.6 million	BDT17.0 billion	5.1%
Foreign direct investment, net inflows	$5.4 million		0.0%
Personal remittances, received	$381.1 million		1.9%
Total reserves (includes gold) at year end	$159.7 million		
Total reserves in months of imports	0.6		

Note: For the year 1981 average official exchange rate for BDT was 17.99 per US$.

== Events ==
- 17 May - Sheikh Hasina, the daughter of Bangladesh founder Sheikh Mujibur Rahman returned from India after more than five years exile that began after his assassination. More than one million of her supporters turned out to welcome her return, and she urged the nation to work toward restoring democracy.
- 30 May - Ziaur Rahman, President of Bangladesh, was assassinated as he spent the night in Chittagong. Taking place at 4:00 am local time, the attack was planned by Major General Muhammed Manzur. Lt. Col. Motiur Rahman shot and killed the pajama-clad President Ziaur.
- 12 June - Abdus Sattar handed the key of historical 32 Dhanmondi House to Sheikh Hasina
- 15 November - Abdus Sattar was confirmed as President of Bangladesh in an election suspected of being rigged. Running on the Nationalist Party ticket as one of 23 candidates, Sattar, who had been the acting president since the May 30 assassination of Ziaur Rahman, officially received 14,217,601 votes, nearly two-thirds of those cast, while runner up Kamal Hossain of the Awami League got 5,694,884.

=== Awards and Recognitions ===
==== Independence Day Award ====
Recipients	Area	Note
Maulana Mohammad Akram Khan	journalism	posthumous
Abbas Uddin	music	posthumous
Major Abdul Ghani	social work	posthumous
Shamsunnahar Mahmud	social work	posthumous
Abbas Mirja	sports	posthumous
Dewan Mohammad Azraf	literature	
Waliullah patwari	education	
Ustad Khadem Hossain Khan	music	

==== Ekushey Padak ====
1. Abu Rushd Matinuddin (literature)
2. Aminul Islam (fine arts)
3. Abdul Halim Chowdhury (music)
4. Mumtaz Ali Khan (music)
5. Gauhar Jamil (dance)
6. Mohammad Zakaria (drama)
7. Zahur Hossain Chowdhury (journalism)
8. Obaidul Huq (journalism)
9. Mustafa Nurul Islam (literature)

=== Sports ===
- Domestic football:
  - Abahani KC won 1981 Dhaka First Division League title.
  - Mohammedan SC won the title of Bangladesh Federation Cup.
- Cricket:
  - Marylebone Cricket Club cricket team visited Bangladesh and played a number of friendly matches with the Bangladesh team.

== Births ==
- Enamul Hossain, chess grandmaster

== Deaths ==
- 30 May: Ziaur Rahman, president (b. 1936)
- 15 June: Gamiruddin Pradhan, politician (b. 1918)
- 24 June: Abdul Matin Chowdhury, academic (b. 1921)
- 2 August: Syed A. B. Mahmud Hossain, jurist (b. 1916)
- 7 August: Mahbubul Alam, author (b. 1898)
- 9 October: Qazi Motahar Hossain, author (b. 1897)

== See also ==
- 1980s in Bangladesh
- List of Bangladeshi films of 1981
- Timeline of Bangladeshi history
