= Mukul Chowdhury =

- মুকুল চৌধুরী
- Born: 1945 or 1946 (c.); Balaganj, Sylhet, British India
- Died: 4 April 2002 (aged 56); Kolkata, India
- Occupations: Lyricist; Musical artist
- Musical career
- Genres: Film songs; Folk
- Instruments: Vocal; Vibraphone
- Years active: 1970–2001

Mukul Chowdhury (Bangla:মুকুল চৌধুরী) was a Bangladeshi lyricist and musical artist. He wrote many songs for radio, television and more than hundreds of films including 'O Madhobi Go Theko Mor Antore,' 'Tumi Accho Sobi Acche,' 'Ek Chor Jay Chole' and 'Ore Nil Doriya Amay De Re De Chhariya.'

== Early life and career ==
Chowdhury was born in Balaganj, Sylhet. He lived in the Motijheel AGB Colony, Dhaka. He and Alam Khan used to play football together in the colony field and became best of friends. Mukul played vibraphone and wrote poetry. Alam Khan suggested he write lyrics for songs and the next day Mukul wrote 'O Madhobi go Theko mor Antore,' which was then set to music by Alam Khan and later sung by Rowshan Ara Mustafiz. Other works he wrote include 'Bhalobeshe Gelam Shudhu Bhalobasha Pelam Na' for the film Keu Karo Noy, 'Tumi Accho Sobi Acche' for the film Sokhi Tumi Kar and 'Hiramoti Hiramoti' for the film Sareng Bou.

Chowdhury is best known for the lyrics of 'Ore Nil Doriya Amay De Re De Chhariya'. The music was composed and produced by Alam Khan and sung by Abdul Jabbar for the Bangladeshi film Sareng Bou, directed by Abdullah Al Mamun.

== Death ==
Chowdhury went to Kolkata in 2002 On 4 April 2002 he died of a heart attack at a local clinic there.

The Pancham cultural events at The Central Public Library in Dhaka on 8 May 2002 was dedicated to Chowdhury.

== Film Discography ==
Year	Film	Song(s)	Singer(s)	Composer(s)	Co-artist(s)	Notes
1970	Kanch Kata Hire	"O Boner Kokila Re"	Sabina Yasmin	Alam Khan	solo	debut film
1976	Gunda	"Ami Bostir Rani"	Sabina Yasmin	Alam Khan	solo	
1976	Gunda	"Mon Boleche Ami Preme Porechi"	Sabina Yasmin	Alam Khan	solo	
1976	Gunda	"Bhoy Bhoy Lage"	Sabina Yasmin, Ferdous Wahid	Alam Khan	solo	
1976	Gunda	"Jeona Priyotoma"	Sabina Yasmin, Mohammed Ali Siddiqui	Alam Khan	solo	
1976	Gunda	"Ami Ek Matal"	Sabina Yasmin, Ferdous Wahid	Alam Khan	solo	
1976	Ki Je Kori	"Mon Debo Ki Debona"	Sabina Yasmin	Alam Khan	solo	
1976	Ki Je Kori	"Na Kichhu Koite Pari"	Sabina Yasmin	Alam Khan	solo	
1976	Raj Rani	"Hujure Aala Tumi"	Runa Laila	Alam Khan	solo	
1976	Raj Rani	"Na Na Na Na Deewana"	Runa Laila	Alam Khan	solo	
1976	Raj Rani	"Rajkumari Amina Ami"	Sabina Yasmin	Alam Khan	solo	
1976	Raj Rani	"Tumi Amar Moner Raja"	Sabina Yasmin	Alam Khan	solo	
1977	Daata Hatem Tai	"Kotodin Koto Jug Dhore"	Sabina Yasmin	Ali Hossain	Gazi Mazharul Anwar, Mohammad Rafiquzzaman and Golam Sarwar	
1977	Daata Hatem Tai	"Mor Janeri Jaan"	Sabina Yasmin	Ali Hossain	Gazi Mazharul Anwar, Mohammad Rafiquzzaman and Golam Sarwar	
1978	Kapurush	"Amake Jodi Pete Chao"	Runa Laila	Alam Khan	solo	
1978	Kapurush	"Borodin Aaj"	Sabina Yasmin	Alam Khan	solo	
1978	Kapurush	"Jokhon Amar Daak Shunbe"	Sabina Yasmin	Alam Khan	solo	
1978	Kapurush	"Shopno Je Amar Duti Noyone"	Sabina Yasmin, Ferdous Wahid	Alam Khan	solo	
1978	Sareng Bou	"Hiramoti Hiramoti"	N/A	Alam Khan	solo	
1978	Sareng Bou	"Kobe Hobe Dekha Tomar Shone"	Sabina Yasmin, Indramohan Rajbangshi, Rabindranath Rai	Alam Khan	solo	
1978	Sareng Bou	"Ore Nil Doriya Amay De Re De Chhariya"	Abdul Jabbar	Alam Khan	solo	
1979	Chhoto Maa	"O Rana Amar Rana"	Alam Khan	Mukul Chowdhury	Khurshid Alam, Runa Laila	
1979	Jobab	"O Sagor Sagor Re"	Sabina Yasmin	Alam Khan	Gazi Mazharul Anwar	
1979	Aradhona	"Ami Tomar Bodhu"	Shammi Akhtar	Alam Khan	solo	
1979	Aradhona	"Ami Na Janlam"	Indramohan Rajbongshi	Alam Khan	solo	
1979	Aradhona	"Tumi Bole Dakle"	Khurshid Alam	Alam Khan	solo	
1979	Aradhona	"Chithi Diyo (version 1)"	Shammi Akhtar	Alam Khan	solo	
1979	Aradhona	"Chithi Diyo (version 2)"	Sabina Yasmin	Alam Khan	solo	
1979	Kanya Bodol	"Ekhane Noy Okhane Cholo"	Runa Laila	Alam Khan	solo	
1979	Kanya Bodol	"Eso Eso Aaj Bhab Kori"	Runa Laila, Khurshid Alam	Alam Khan	solo	
1979	Kanya Bodol	"O Mama Mama"	Sabina Yasmin, Tele Samad	Alam Khan	solo	
1979	Meher Banu	"Ami Ghor Bandhilam Pirit Koriya"	Ferdous Wahid, Sabina Yasmin	Alam Khan	co-singer	co-sang in a film for the first time
1980	Jadu Nogor	"Aayre Lal Pori Aay"	Sabina Yasmin	Alam Khan	M A Malek	
1980	Jadu Nogor	"Ami Ek Jug Pore Peyechi Dekha"	Runa Laila	Alam Khan	M A Malek	
1980	Jadu Nogor	"Chokhe Chokhe Khuji Jare"	Sabina Yasmin	Alam Khan	M A Malek	
1980	Jadu Nogor	"Eito Ekhane Ami"	Runa Laila	Alam Khan	M A Malek	
1980	Jadu Nogor	"Khola Khola Akashe"	Andrew Kishore, Rulia Rahman	Alam Khan	M A Malek	
1980	Jadu Nogor	"Nachere Tale Tale"	Sabina Yasmin	Alam Khan	M A Malek	
1980	Protiggya	"Banda Tulechhe Du Haat"	Anjuman Ara Begum, Khurshid Alam, Sabina Yasmin,	Alam Khan	solo	
1980	Protiggya	"Ek Chor Jay Chole"	Andrew Kishore	Alam Khan	solo	
1980	Sokhi Tumi Kar	"Joto Khushi Khun Khun Khela"	Runa Laila	Alam Khan	solo	
1980	Sokhi Tumi Kar	"Koto Dure Aar Koto Dure"	Runa Laila	Alam Khan	solo	
1980	Sokhi Tumi Kar	"Tumi Achho Sobi Achhe"	Abdul Jabbar	Alam Khan	solo	
1981	Badhonhara	"Na Na Na Tomay Jete Debona"	Runa Laila	Alam Khan	solo	
1982	Keu Karo Noy	"Bhalobeshe Gelam Shudhu Bhalobasha Pelam Na"	Sabina Yasmin	Alam Khan	solo	
1982	Keu Karo Noy	"Bujan Lo Bujan"	Sabina Yasmin, Runa Laila	Alam Khan	solo	
1982	Keu Karo Noy	"Mon To Manena"	Runa Laila	Alam Khan	solo	
1982	Natbou	"Hadudu Du Du"	Khurshid Alam, Runa Laila	Alam Khan	Md. Shahed Ali Majnu	
1983	Maan Somman	"Amari Naam Bhalobasha"	Runa Laila	Alam Khan	Syed Shamsul Haque	
1983	Maan Somman	"Allah Allah Tor Duniyata Samla"	Runa Laila	Alam Khan	Syed Shamsul Haque	
1983	Maan Somman	"Aaj Ami Kal Tumi"	Runa Laila	Alam Khan	solo	
1983	Maan Somman	"Tomake Khoda Gorechhe Nije"	Sabina Yasmin, Andrew Kishore	Alam Khan	Syed Shamsul Haque	
1988	Tolpar	"Sedin To Bolecho Bhalobaso"	Sabina Yasmin	Alam Khan	solo	
1995	Ghor Duar	"Amar Moner Deepali"	Runa Laila	Alam Khan	Moniruzzaman Monir, Khoshnur Alamgir	
1995	Ghor Duar	"Tui Amar Jaaner Jaan"	Runa Laila	Alam Khan	Moniruzzaman Monir, Khoshnur Alamgir	
1995	Ghor Duar	"Tomar Abbake Bolo"	Runa Laila, Andrew Kishore	Alam Khan	Moniruzzaman Monir, Khoshnur Alamgir	
1995	Ghor Duar	"Tumi Asha Bhalobasha"	Sabina Yasmin, Andrew Kishore	Alam Khan	Moniruzzaman Monir, Khoshnur Alamgir	
2001	Bheja Biral	"Jibon To Ektai"	Syed Abdul Hadi, Andrew Kishore, Dolly Sayontoni, Asma Debjani	Alam Khan	Milton Khandaker	featured last song of his life "Jibon To Ektai"
2001	Bheja Biral	N/A	Syed Abdul Hadi, Andrew Kishore, Dolly Sayontoni, Asma Debjani	Alam Khan	Milton Khandaker	featured last song of his life "Jibon To Ektai"
N/A	Chhoto Maa	N/A	Anjuman Ara Begum, Khurshid Alam, Sabina Yasmin, Mohammad Ali Siddiqui	Alam Khan	solo	

== Non-film songs ==
Year	Song(s)	Singer(s)	Composer(s)	Co-artist(s)	ref.
1978	"Amar Premer Tori Boyya Chole"	Ferdous Wahid	Alam Khan	solo	
N/A	"Padma Nodir Teerti Gheshe"	Ferdous Wahid	Alam Khan	solo	
N/A	"Chithi Likhachhi Nishi Raitte"	Runa Laila	Alam Khan	solo	
