= List of Bangladeshi music producers =

Bangladeshi record producers

This page lists notable Bangladeshi music producers.

== Male ==
- Fuad al Muqtadir: Pop, Electronic, World, R&Bmusic.
- Azam Khan (singer): Pop, Rock, Metal
- Ayub Bachchu: Rock, Metal, Soul
- Habib Wahid: EDM, Pop, R&B, World
- Tahsan Rahman Khan: World, Soul, Rock, Pop, R&B
- Pritom Hasan: EDM, Pop, Soul, Indie Pop
- Emon Chowdhury: Country, R&B, Soul
- Shayan Chowdhury Arnob: Country, R&B
- Tamal Hadiul: Pop, EDM, Soft rock
- Shafin Ahmed: Rock, Soul, Blues
- Saidus Salehin Khaled Sumon: Rock, World, Soul
- Raef al Hasan Rafa: Rock, Metal, Pop
- Minar Rahman: Pop, Soul, R&B
- Bappa Mazumdar: R&B, Jazz
- Imran Mahmudul: R&B, Pop

== Female ==
- Mehreen Mahmud: Soul, R&B
- Sharmin Sultana Sumi: Folk, Rock, Country, World

== See also ==
- List of Bangladeshi musicians
- List of Bangladeshi playback singers
