= Alam Khan discography =

Alam Khan was a Bangladeshi music director and film score composer. He has composed music for 196 films. The following is a complete list of the films he scored:

== 1970s ==
Year	Film	Notes
1970	Kanch Kata Hire	debut film
1971	Smritituku Thak	
1973	Amar Jonmobhumi	
1973	Khelaghor	
1973	Paye Cholar Poth	
1975	Love In Shimla	
1976	Ek Mutho Bhat	
1976	Gunda	
1976	Ki Je Kori	
1976	Raj Rani	
1976	Suprobhat	
1977	Aguner Alo	
1977	Dost Dushmon	
1977	Mail Train	marked the debut of Andrew Kishore
1978	Kapurush	
1978	Mintu Amar Naam	
1978	Raj Dulari	
1978	Sareng Bou	
1979	Aradhona	
1979	Barood	
1979	Chhoto Maa	
1979	Jobab	
1979	Kanya Bodol	
1979	Meher Banu	
1979	Maheshkhalir Baanke	

== 1980s ==
Year	Film	Notes
1980	Emiler Goenda Bahini	Winner: Bachsas Award for Best Music Director
1980	Hur-e-Arab	
1980	Jadu Nogor	
1980	Jodi Jantem	
1980	Nag Purnima	
1980	Pratigya	
1980	Sokhi Tumi Kar	
1981	Aladin Alibaba Sindbad	
1981	Badhonhara	
1981	Jibon Nouka	
1981	Matir Putul	
1982	Ashirbad	
1982	Bhalobasha	
1982	Boro Bhalo Lok Chhilo	Winner: Bangladesh National Film Award for Best Music Director
1982	Keu Karo Noy	
1982	Maane Na Maana	
1982	Natbou	
1982	Rajanigandha	
1982	Rajar Raja	
1982	Reshmi Churi	
1982	Shanai	
1983	Ali Asma	
1983	Challenge	
1983	Johnny	
1983	Maan Somman	
1983	Pransojoni	
1984	Anyay	
1984	Rajdondo	
1984	Shorif Bodmash	
1984	Shorojontro	
1985	Hisab Nikash	
1985	Kabin Korbani	
1985	Korbani	
1985	Shomsher	
1985	Sonai Bondhu	
1985	Teen Konya	Winner: Bangladesh National Film Award for Best Music Director
1986	Ashanti	
1986	Awara	
1986	Dhormo Amar Maa	
1986	Griho Bibad	
1986	Khamosh	
1986	Loraku	
1986	Martial Hero	
1986	Sohel Rana	
1987	Adil	
1987	Atyachar	
1987	Hero	
1987	Humki	
1987	Lalu Mastan	
1987	Morjada	
1987	Poddo Gokhra	
1987	Protibad	
1987	Shotota	
1987	Surrender	Winner: Bangladesh National Film Award for Best Music Director
1988	Bhaijaan	
1988	Biswas Abiswas	
1988	Boner Moto Bon	
1988	Dui Jibon	penned lyrics also
1988	Jadu Mohol	
1988	Tolpar	Winner:Bachsas Awards for Best Music Director
1989	Ami Ee Shahenshah	
1989	Bhaijan	
1989	Bheja Chokh	
1989	Bir Bikrom	
1989	Birpurush	
1989	Bisforon	
1989	Bojromushti	
1989	Bou Shashuri	
1989	Durnam	
1989	Master Samurai	
1989	Okorma	
1989	Raja Johnny	
1989	Satya Mithya	

== 1990s ==
Year	Film	Notes
1990	Adesh	
1990	Arjon	
1990	Asman Jomin	
1990	Bhai Bhai	
1990	Dolna	
1991	Gherao	
1991	Linja	
1991	Ochena	
1991	Satya Mithya	
1991	Shantona	
1991	Sontrash	
1991	Top Rongbaz	
1992	Ajker Humgama	
1992	Beporowa	
1992	Chorer Bou	
1992	Ghor Bhanga Ghor	
1992	Dinkaal	Winner: Bangladesh National Film Award for Best Music Director
1992	Maa Mati Desh	
1992	Matir Kosom	
1992	Premer Protidan	
1992	Somporko	
1992	Tyaag	
1992	Utthan Poton	
1993	Anutopoto	
1993	Banglar Bodhu	
1993	Keyamat Theke Keyamat	composed with Anand-Milind
1993	Johnny Ostad	
1994	Commander	
1994	Ghrina	
1994	Ghatok	
1994	Ontore Ontore	
1994	Shot Manush	
1995	Bhangchur	
1995	Bissho Premik	
1995	Ghor Duar	
1995	Papi Shotru	
1995	Premer Ohongkar	
1995	Shopner Thikana	
1995	Songsarer Sukh Dukkho	
1996	Banglar Maa	
1996	Bichar Hobe	
1996	Ei Ghar Ei Sansar	
1996	Ghat Protighat	
1996	Goriber Ostad	
1996	Lompot	
1996	Malamal	
1996	Nirmom	
1996	Pran Sojoni	
1996	Priyojon	
1996	Rakkhos	
1996	Shoytan Manush	
1997	Amar Maa	
1997	Baper Taka	Winner:Bachsas Awards for Best Music Director
1997	Coolie	
1997	Golaguli	
1997	Hridoyer Ayna	
1997	Mohan Bondhu	
1997	Noropishach	
1997	Palabi Kothay	
1997	Shanti Chai	
1998	Bhondo	
1998	Mrityudata	
1998	Shesh Protikkha	
1999	Ashami Bondhu	
1999	Lonkakando	
1999	Madam Fuli	
1999	Pagla Ghonta	
1999	Ononto Bhalobasha	

== 2000s ==
Year	Film	Notes
2000	Akheri Jobab	
2000	Dui Bodhu Ek Swami	
2000	Ei Mon Chay Je	
2000	Joddha	
2000	Khaichi Tore	
2000	Shesh Thikana	
2001	Bheja Biral	
2001	Kothin Bastob	
2002	Bhoyanok Songhorsho	
2002	Major Saheb	
2002	Mastaner Upor Mastan	
2002	Mukhoshdhari	
2003	Antore Jhor	
2003	Chai Khomota	
2003	Dui Bodhu Ek Swami	
2003	Gundar Prem	
2003	Top Somrat	
2004	Tyag	
2006	Chachchu	
2008	Ki Jadu Korila	
2009	Ebadot	Winner: Bangladesh National Film Award for Best Music Director

== 2010s ==
Year	Film	Notes
2010	Mayer Chokh	
2011	Ke Apon Ke Por	

== 2020s ==
Year	Film	Notes
2021	Swapner Thikana	

== Year Unknown ==
Film	Notes
Gaddar	

=== Non-film songs (Lyrics) ===
Year	Film	Song	Songwriter(s)	Co-artist(s)
N/A	Single	"Nodir Majhi Bole"	Khandaker Nurul Alam	Runa Laila
