= Meril-Prothom Alo Lifetime Achievement Award =

Bangladeshi TV and film award

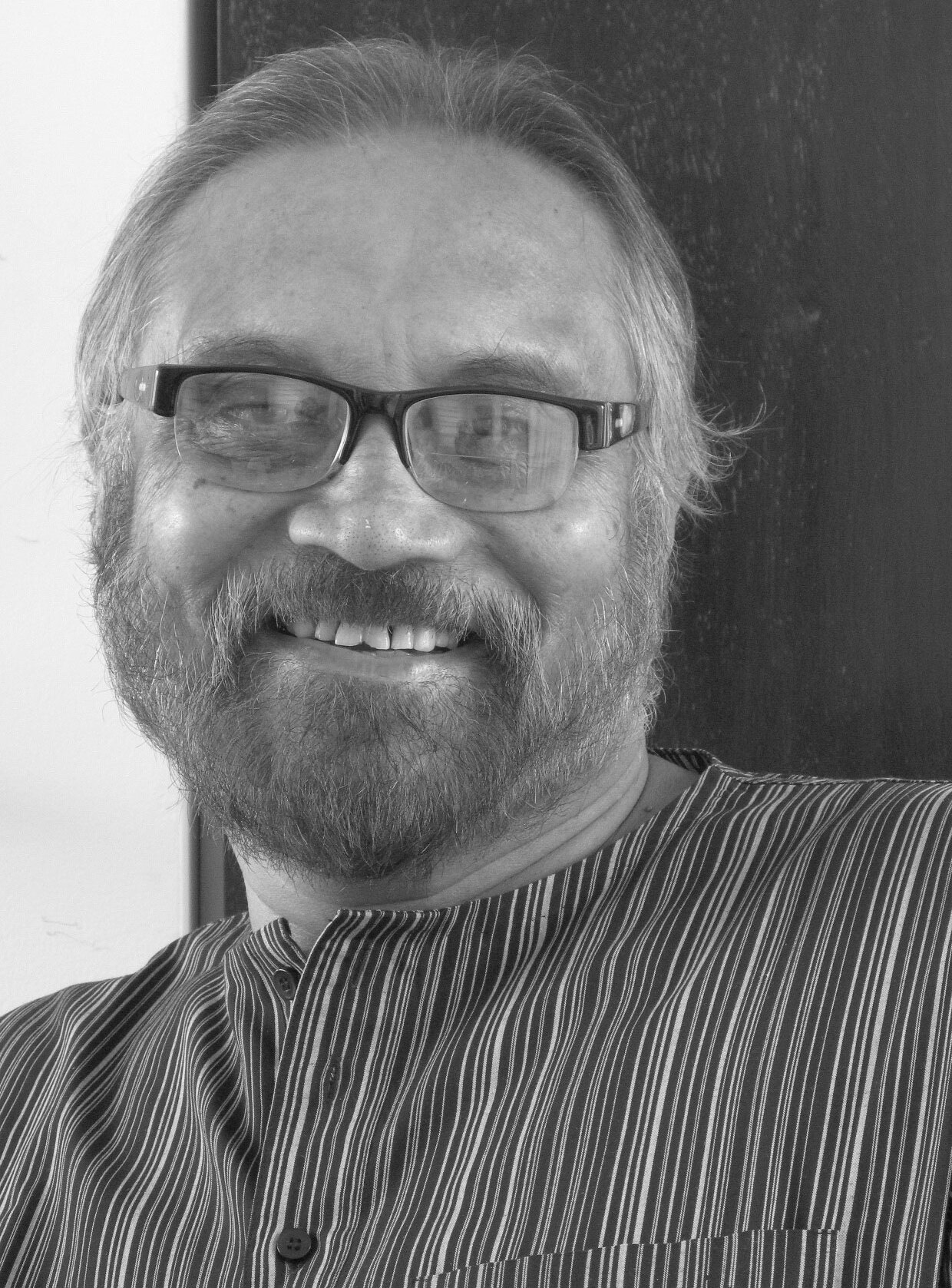
- The 2019 recipient: Aly Zaker
- Awarded for: Commemorating an artist's career
- Country: Bangladesh
- Presented by: Meril-Prothom Alo
- First award: Sohrab Hossain (2002)
- Currently held by: Aly Zaker (2019)

Meril-Prothom Alo Lifetime Achievement Award, is given by the Meril-Prothom Alo as part of its annual Meril-Prothom Alo Awards for Bangladeshi people.

== Superlatives ==
- Oldest Winner – Shah Abdul Karim in 7th Meril-Prothom Alo Awards (aged 89)
- Youngest Winner – Firoza Begum in 13th Meril-Prothom Alo Awards (aged 56)
- Number of Female recipients – 6
- Number of Male recipients – 12

== List of honourees ==
Year	Image	Honorees	Profession	Age when awarded (in years)	Ref.(s)
2002		Sohrab Hossain	Singer	80	
2003		Subhash Dutta	Actor	73	
2004		Abdul Latif	Singer	77	
2005		Shah Abdul Karim	Singer	89	
2006		Ferdousi Mazumder	Singer	63	
2007		Kalim Sharafi	Singer	83	
2008		Ferdausi Rahman	Singer	67	
2009		Baby Islam	Cinematographer	82	
2010		Sudhin Das	Singer	80	
2011		Firoza Begum	Singer	56	
2012		Mustafa Monwar	Painters	77	
2013		Ramkanai Das	Singer	78	
2014		Razzak	Actor	71	
2015		Fahmida Khatun	Singer	72	
2016		Kabori Sarwar	Actress	65	
2017		Syed Hasan Imam	Actor	82	
2018		Babita	Actress	63	
2019		Aly Zaker	Actor	74	

== See also ==
- Meril-Prothom Alo Awards
