= Amirul Islam =

Amirul Islam may refer to:

- M Amirul Islam (1918–2001), Bangladeshi academic, researcher, and scientist
- M Amir-ul Islam (born 1937), Bangladeshi lawyer
- Amirul Islam Chowdhury (born 1942), Bangladeshi academic
- Amirul Islam (lyricist), Bangladeshi lyricist
- Amirul Islam (politician), Indian politician from West Bengal
- Amirul Islam (field hockey), Bangladeshi field hockey player
- Amirul Islam (footballer), Bangladeshi footballer
