= Rafiqul Alam =

Rafiqul Alam may refer to:

- Rafique Alam (1929–2011), Indian politician
- Rafiqul Alam (cricketer) (born 1957), Bangladeshi cricketer
- Rafiqul Alam (singer), Bangladeshi singer
