= Abhijan =

Abhijan may refer to:

- Abhijñā, Sanskrit term for knowledge, and supernormal knowledge in Buddhism
- Abhijan (1962 film), an Indian Bengali film directed by Satyajit Ray
- Abhijan (1984 film), a Bangladeshi film directed by Abdur Razzak
- Abhijaan (2022 film), an Indian Bengali biographical film directed by Parambrata Chatterjee

== See also ==
- Abhijnana Sakuntala, ancient Indian play in Sanskrit by Kalidasa
