= Joy Bangla, Banglar Joy =

1970 song

Song by Shahnaz Rahmatullah and Abdul Jabbar
- Language: Bengali
- Released: 1970
- Recorded: 1970
- Genre: Patriotic
- Label: Dacca Record
- Songwriter: Gazi Mazharul Anwar
- Composer: Anwar Pervez

"Joy Bangla, Banglar Joy" is a patriotic and awakening song of Bangladesh. Gazi Mazharul Anwar wrote the song in March 1970. He wrote the song by rhythmicizing the deprivation, misery, dreams and aspirations of seven and a half crore Bengalis at that time. The song inspired Bengalis during the Bangladesh Liberation War. The song was ranked 13th out of 20 songs as the 'Greatest Bengali Song of All Time' in a BBC poll.

== Background ==
In 1970, businessman and film producer Mohammad Abul Khayer took the initiative to make a film called Joy Bangla based on the Six point movement. Cinematographer Fakrul Alam penned the screenplay for the film and Gazi Mazharul Anwar, the lyricist, wrote the song for the film.

In March 1970, Gazi Mazharul Anwar began writing the song 'Joy Bangla, Banglardialogues' at Farmgate's recording studio. Anwar Parvez was present there, and he composed the song. Shahnaz Rahmatullah and Abdul Jabbar have sung the song.

The film was submitted to the censors that year, but the then Pakistani government blocked the release of the film, but the film was released on January 26, 1972, after the independence of Bangladesh.

However, before the release of the film, 'Dhaka Records' owned by director Salahuddin released the film's songs and dialogues. At that time the song 'Jai Bangla, Banglar Jai' became popular.

== Influence ==
The Independent Bengal Radio Centre played an unforgettable role in stimulating the morale of freedom fighters and countrymen during the liberation war. Every day during the war, people eagerly waited to listen to the programs of Independent Bengal Radio Centre. The song "Joy Bangla, Banglar Joy" was aired first as the opening song from the station.

== See also ==
- Joy Bangla
