= List of Bangladeshi films of 1981 =

A list of Bangladeshi films released in 1981.

== Releases ==
Title	Director	Cast	Genre	Notes	Release date	Ref.
Angshidar	Dilip Biswas	Razzak, Shabana, Zafar Iqbal, Anjona, Sumita Devi, Rahman, Narayan Chakraborty, Anwara			2 January	
Badal	Ashok Ghosh	Shabana, Mahmud kalie				
Shahazadi Gulbahar	Shahidul Amin					
Rajar Raja	Alamgir Kumkum	Razzak, Shabana, Alamgeer				
Putro Bodhu	Kamal Ahmed	Razzak, Shabana, Golam Mostafa, Manju Dutta, Kalpona, Narayan Chakraborty			13 February	
Mouchor	Razzak	Razzak, Kajri, Khalil Ullah Khan, Prabir Mitra, Narayan Chakraborty			6 March	
Bhalo Manush	Chashi Nazrul Islam	Bulbul Ahmed		Bulbul Ahmed produced film		
Jhumka	Alamgir Kumkum	Razzak, Shabana				
Bini Sutar Mala	Fakhrul Hasan Bairagi	Wasim, Rozina, Anwar Hossain, Golam Mostafa			10 April	
Aladdin Alibaba Sindabad	Shafi Bikrampuri	Wasim, Rozina, Sohel Rana, Javed				
Pardeshi	M A Malek					
Nowabzadi	Ashok Ghosh	Shabana, Alamgir, Mahmud Kalie, Anwar Hossain, Ahmed Sharif, Maya Hazarika				
Rakhe Allah Mare Ke	Abdus Shattar					
Sonar Tori	Azizur Rahman	Faruk, Kabori, Bulbul Ahmed, Suchorita, Saifuddin			12 June	
Sukher Sansar	Narayan Ghosh Mita					
Sultan Daku	F. Kabir Chowdhury	Javed, Rozina, Golam Mostafa, Anwar Hossain			19 June	
Lagam	Mushtaq	Suchorita, Nawshad, Golam Mostafa, Tina Khan, Anwar Hossain			26 June	
Mohanagar	Azizur Rahman	Razzak, Shabana				
Masum	Sheikh Nazrul Islam	Faruk, Anjona, Sumita Devi, Shawkat Akbar, Saifuddin, Anwara			3 August	
Selim Javed	Delwar Jahan Jhantu	Sohel Rana, Jashim, Suchorita, Ahmed Sharif, Mahbub Khan Gui, Adil, Jambue, Afganie				
Gharoni	Hafizuddin	Razzak, Shabana				
Badhon Hara	A J Mintu	Shabana, Sohel Rana, Prabir Mitra, Suchorita		The film produced by BFDC with A J Mintu		
Matir Putul	Abdus Samad Khokon	Faruk, Shabana, Rozina, Khalil Ullah Khan, Narayan Chakraborty			4 August	
Swami	Nur ul Alam	Bulbul Ahmed, Shabana, Golam Mostafa, Rosy Afsari			19 September	
Ostad Shagret	Deowan Nazrul	Shabana, Alamgeer, Sohel Rana, Suchorita, Jashim				
Maa o Meye	Golam Nabi					
Kudrat	Momtaz Ali	Wasim, Shabana, Suchorita, Uzzal, Golam Mostafa			9 October	
Bhanga Gora	Kamal Ahmed	Razzak, Shabana, Alamgir, Narayan Chakraborty, Anwar Hossain, Nahid			9 October	
Raj Nortoki	Ibn Mizan	Razzak, Bobita, Javed				
Jibon Nouka	Masud Parvez (Sohel Rana)	Sohel Rana, Suchorita, Kamal Parvez				
Akash Pori	Aziz Meher	Wasim, Bobita, Javed, Nutan, Adil, Saifuddin			20 October	
Dena Pawna	Nurul Huq Bachchu	Alamgir, Jayasree Kabir, Suchorita, Rahman, Sumita Devi			25 October	
Sukhe Thako	Azharul Islam Khan	Razzak, Bobita, Anjona, Kajorie, Khalil Ullah Khan, Narayan Chakraborty			27 November	
Janata Express	Azizur Rahman	Faruk, Rozina, Uzzal, Julia, Narayan Chakraborty			4 December	
Shakkhi	Awkat Hossain	Bobita, Washim, Bulbul Ahmed, Suchorita, Elias Kanchon, Mustafa, Darashiko		Awkat Hossain Debut directed film		
Allah Meherban	Mohsin	Razzak, Shabana, Bulbul Ahmed, Sumita Devi, Bonanie Choudhury			25 December	
Kolmilata	Shahidul Haque Khan	Bulbul Ahmed, Kabori Sarwar, Sohel Rana, Ilias Kanchan, Suchorita, Rosy Afsari		Shahidul Haque Khan debut directed film	25 December	
Lal Sobujer Pala	Hasan Imam	Asad, Kabori Sarwar, Suborna Mustafa, Sumita Devi			31 December	
Jonmo Theke Jolchi	Amjad Hossain	Bobita, Bulbul Ahmed				

== See also ==
- 1981 in Bangladesh
