= Salam Salam Hajar Salam =

1971 Bengali patriotic song by Abdul Jabbar

Song by Abdul Jabbar
- Language: Bengali
- Released: 14 March 1971
- Recorded: 1971
- Genre: Patriotic song
- Songwriter: Fazal-e-Khuda
- Composer: Abdul Jabbar

"Salam Salam Hajar Salam" (Bengali: সালাম সালাম হাজার সালাম, lit. 'Salutes, Salutes, Thousands Salutes') is a Bengali language patriotic song written by the Bangladeshi litterateur Fazal-e-Khuda and composed by the Bangladeshi singer Abdul Jabbar. The song was first broadcast in the radio on 14 March 1971.

== Popularity ==
The song was broadcast in the voice of Jabbar from the Swadhin Bangla Betar Kendra to inspire the Bangladeshi freedom fighters during the Liberation War of Bangladesh. The song ranked 12th in the list of the twenty greatest Bengali songs of all time in a 2006 survey conducted by BBC Bangla.

In 2024, Bangladeshi intellectual Rahman Mridha proposed the song for the national anthem of Bangladesh replacing "Amar Sonar Bangla", signifying its link to the Bengali language movement and the Liberation War of the country.
