= Sokhi Tumi Kar =

1980 film by Abdullah al Mamun

- Poster
- Directed by: Abdullah al Mamun
- Screenplay by: Abdullah al Mamun
- Starring: Shabana; Abdur Razzak; Farooque
- Music by: Alam Khan
- Release date: 1980
- Country: Bangladesh
- Language: Bengali

Sokhi Tumi Kar (English: Darling you're whose?) (Bengali: সখি তুমি কার?) is a 1980 Bangladeshi film starring Shabana, Farooque and Razzak. Shabana earned her maiden National Film Award for Best Actress for the film.

== Story ==
Farooque and Razzak play brothers, while Shabana plays the younger brother's love interest. When the younger brother goes abroad to study, the older brother forcefully marries her.

== Cast ==
- Shabana
- Abdur Razzak
- Farooque
- Suja Khondokar

== Soundtrack ==
The music was composed by Alam Khan and written by Mukul Chowdhury.

Song title	Singer
"Tumi Achho Sobi Achhe"	Abdul Jabbar
"Koto Dur Aar Koto Dure"	Runa Laila

== Awards ==
Bangladesh National Film Awards

Best Actress – Shabana
