= Rafiqul Alam (singer) =

Bangladeshi musician

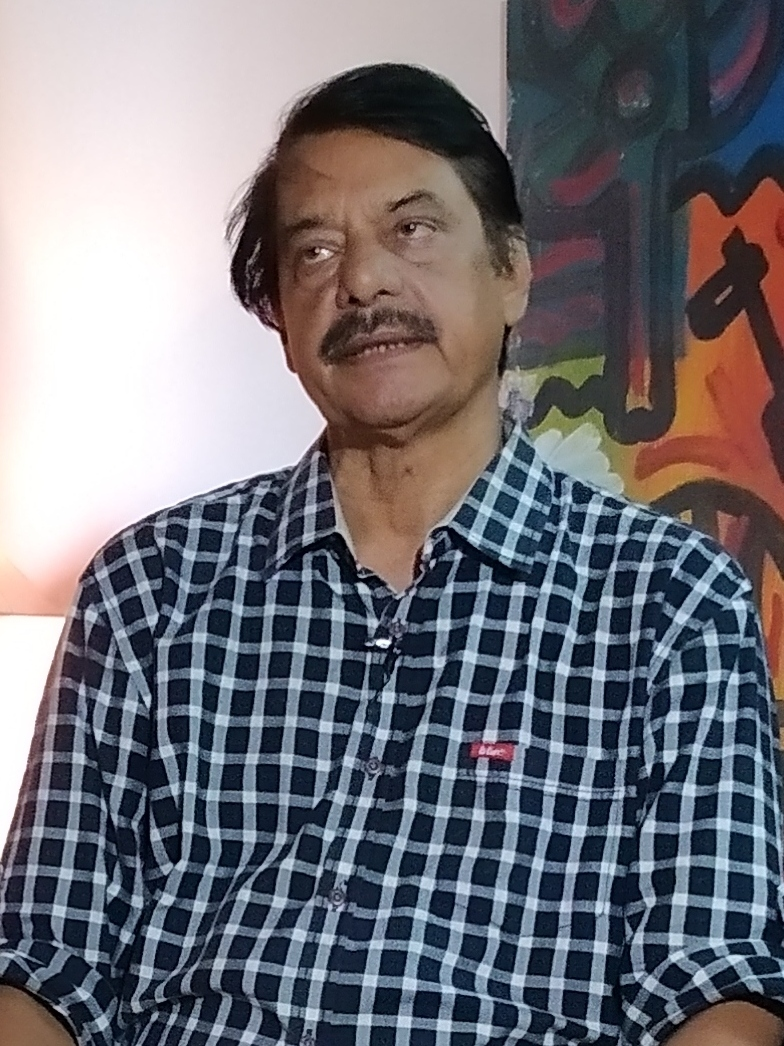
- Alam in 2019
- Education: University of Rajshahi
- Occupation: Singer
- Spouse: Abida Sultana

Rafiqul Alam is a Bangladeshi musician. He was an artist of Swadhin Bangla Betar Kendra in 1971. He is also a playback singer. As of 2013, he had recorded over 300 playback songs for films. Alam received the Bangladesh National Film Award two times and the Cine Journalists' Association Award.

== Early life and career ==
Alam's grew up in Rajshahi. His elder brother Sarwar Jahan was a locally renowned singer. He was trained under Pandit Haripada Das, Abdul Jabbar and Ustad Sagiruddin Khan of Kolkata. He learnt Rabindra Sangeet and songs of Atul Prasad from Kanika Bandopadhyay and Ajit Roy.

After passing the matriculation examination from Bholanath Bishweshwar Hindu Academy in Rajshahi in 1963, he enrolled in the Higher Secondary program at Rajshahi College. He then enrolled at the University of Rajshahi, initially in the Department of Economics and later in the Department of Political Science. The rich cultural environment of the University of Rajshahi inspired him to pursue and deepen his engagement with cultural activities.

In 1973, Alam performed in a concert held at the Dhaka Stadium, organized by the Bangladesh Music College.

== Personal life ==
Alam is married to singer Abida Sultana. They have a son Farshid Alam.
