= Prothom Bangladesh =

Bangladeshi patriotic song; party anthem of the Bangladesh Nationalist Party (BNP)

Song by Shahnaz Rahmatullah
- Language: Bengali
- Released: Late 1970s
- Genre: Patriotic
- Length: 3:40
- Songwriter: Moniruzzaman Monir
- Composer: Alauddin Ali
- Producer: Nawazish Ali Khan

Music video
- Prothom Bangladesh from Bangladesh Nationalist Party's official channel on YouTube

Prothom Bangladesh
English: The First is Bangladesh
- প্রথম বাংলাদেশ
- Proposed national anthem of Bangladesh Party anthem of the Bangladesh Nationalist Party
- Adopted: 1979 (state; de facto co-official)
- Readopted: 1980s (BNP)
- Relinquished: 1981 (state)
- Preceded by: "Amar Sonar Bangla"
- Succeeded by: "Amar Sonar Bangla"

"Prothom Bangladesh" (Bengali: প্রথম বাংলাদেশ, lit. 'The First Bangladesh') is a Bengali language patriotic song by Shahnaz Rahmatullah. Moniruzzaman Monir wrote and Alauddin Ali composed the song. The song was first broadcast in a TV program on Bangladesh Television in the late 1970s. Under the direction of television channel official Mustafa Kamal Syed, producer Nawazish Ali Khan recorded it along with several other songs.

It's the party anthem of the Bangladesh Nationalist Party (BNP). Previously, the song was also proposed for the national anthem of Bangladesh.

== Proposal for national anthem ==
According to the journalist Azizul Islam Bhuiya, on 12 December 1978, the song was proposed for the national anthem by the BNP leader Chowdhury Kamal Ibne Yusuf during a session over the change of the national flag and the anthem of the country, which the party founder and president Ziaur Rahman reportedly assured.

On 30 April 1979, Shah Azizur Rahman, then-prime minister, sent a secret letter to the Cabinet Division which stated that Amar Sonar Bangla was contradictory with the "spirit of the culture of Bangladesh", as, according to him, Rabindranath Tagore, the writer of the song, was not a citizen of Bangladesh, and was already the writer of the Indian national anthem. He instead proposed this song as the new national anthem. Upon receiving the letter, the Cabinet Division issued instructions to broadcast the song on radio, television and all government programmes. Meanwhile, the proposed national anthem started singing along with Amar Sonar Bangla at the presidential functions. However, the initiative stalled after Rahman was assassinated in 1981.

== Party anthem of the BNP ==
According to singer Baby Naznin, the song was a favorite of Rahman. It was performed at the beginning and end of his events. When Baby and other artists used to sing it on stage, Rahman and his wife Khaleda Zia would also sing along sometimes. Around the 1980s, the song was announced as the official anthem of Rahman's party BNP. However, in 2018, the singer Shahnaz Rahmatullah and composer Alauddin Ali claimed that the party is using the song as the official anthem without their permission.

== Controversies ==
In 2016, Bangladesh Betar fired 6 employees for broadcasting the song during the 2016–17 budget session of the Jatiya Sangsad. In 2025, during a cultural program organized by the Bangladesh Shilpakala Academy in Kishoreganj, controversy arose when the on-duty cultural officer interrupted the performance of the song.

Musician Nashid Kamal alleged that, because the song was associated with the BNP, its singer Rahmatullah had to face political obstacles in the music industry, which eventually forced her to retire as a musician.
