= Abhijan (1984 film) =

- YouTube version poster
- Bengali: অভিযান
- Directed by: Abdur Razzak
- Based on: Syed Shamsul Haque
- Produced by: Abdur Razzak
- Starring: Razzak; Jashim; Ilias Kanchan; Anjana Sultana; Rozina
- Cinematography: Mahfuzur Rahman
- Edited by: Syed Mohammad Awwal
- Music by: Anwar Parvez
- Production company: Rajlokkhi Production
- Distributed by: Rajlokkhi Production
- Release date: 1984
- Country: Bangladesh
- Language: Bengali

Abhijan (transl. adventure) (Bengali: অভিযান) is a 1984 Bangladeshi film starring Ilias Kanchan and Anjana Sultana opposite him. Mahfuzur Rahman Khan bagged Bangladesh National Film Awards for Best Cinematographer. It is directed and produced by Razzak under the banner of Rajlokkhi Production and also stars Razzak, Jashim and Rozina.

== Synopsis ==
Raju, Rauf and Ratan are friends who start a new business together. They get a contract from Rahman to supply materials for his construction site. While traveling by river they rescue Kusum from the river. All three find a girl alone in their boat and try to seduce her. On the other hand, Rahman's old business enemy Sharif attacks them so that they cannot carry their goods properly. They are determined to deal with these and complete their work on time.

== Cast ==
- Razzak
- Jashim
- Ilias Kanchan
- Anjana Sultana
- Rozina

== Music ==
The film's music was composed by Anwar Parvez with lyrics by Gazi Mazharul Anwar.

1. "Hat Dhore Niye Cholo" - Andrew Kishore, Sabina Yasmin

== Awards ==
Bangladesh National Film Awards

- Best Cinematographer – Mahfuzur Rahman Khan
