= Anwar Pervez (musician) =

Bangladeshi music composer and music director

Anwar Parvez
- আনোয়ার পারভেজ
- Died: June 17, 2006
- Occupations: Music composer, music director
- Spouse: Jasmine Parvez
- Relatives: Shahnaz Rahmatullah (sister); Zafar Iqbal (brother)
- Awards: Ekushey Padak

Anwar Parvez (Born 1944 - died June 17, 2006) was a Bangladeshi music composer and music director. He was awarded Ekushey Padak in 2007 by the government of Bangladesh.

== Biography ==
Singer Shahnaz Rahmatullah and actor Zafar Iqbal were Parvez's younger siblings.

He composed the song "Joy Bangla, Banglar Joy" for the film Joy Bangla one night in October 1970. Gazi Mazharul Anwar wrote the lyrics, and it was recorded that same night on a monaural system at the International Recording Studio on Indira Road. When the Bangladesh Liberation War broke out next year and liberation forces set up the radio station Swadhin Bangla Betar Kendra, "Joy Bangla, Banglar Joy" became the opening and closing song for their broadcasts.

Altogether he composed about 2,000 songs and worked as a music director in about 200 feature films.

He had two daughters and a son. He died on June 17, 2006 in Dhaka.

== Filmography ==
- Bindu Thekey Britta (1970)
- Joy Bangla (1972)
- Shokal Shandhya (1974)
- The Rain (1976)
- Shonar Harin (1979)
- Madhu Maloti (1982)
- Abhijan (1984)
- Talaq

== Awards ==
- Ekushey Padak (2007)
- Lifetime Achievement Award by Bangladesh Federation of Film Societies (2006)
