= Sareng Bou =

Bangladeshi film

- Poster
- সারেং বৌ
- Directed by: Abdullah al Mamun
- Based on: Sareng Bou by Shahidullah Kaiser
- Starring: Kabori Sarwar; Farooque
- Release date: 16 June 1978 (Bangladesh)
- Running time: 113 minutes
- Country: Bangladesh
- Language: Bengali

Sareng Bou is a 1978 Bangladeshi film directed by Abdullah Al Mamun, based on the novel of the same name by Shahidullah Kaiser. The film received critical acclaim, particularly for the performance by Kabori Sarwar, who won Bangladesh National Film Award for Best Actress.

== Cast ==
- Kabori Sarwar as Nobitun
- Farooque as Kadom Sareng
- Nazmul Huda Bachchu as Postmaster
- Syed Hasan Imam as Baul
- Golam Mustafa as Kadom's uncle
- Suja Khondokar

== Music ==
Abdul Jabbar was the playback singer. He rendered the song "Ore Neel Doriya Amay De Re De Chhariya". The songs were composed by Alam Khan and written by Mukul Chowdhury.
