= Shayan =

Shayan (Persian: شایان) is a Persian name. Notable people with the name include:

== Given name ==
- Shayan Chowdhury Arnob (born 1978), Bangladeshi musician, singer and composer
- Shayan Jahangir (born 1994), Pakistani-American cricketer
- Shayan Khan, Pakistani-American actor
- Shayan Modarres (born 1984), Iranian-American civil rights activist and attorney
- Shayan Mosleh (born 1993), Iranian footballer
- Shayan Munshi, Indian model and actor
- Shayan Sheikh (born 1998), Pakistani cricketer

== Surname ==
- Fatemeh Shayan, Iranian political scientist
- Hossein Shayan (born 1971), Iranian athlete
