= Kaderi Kibria =

Bangladeshi Rabindra Sangeet singer

- কাদেরী কিবরিয়া
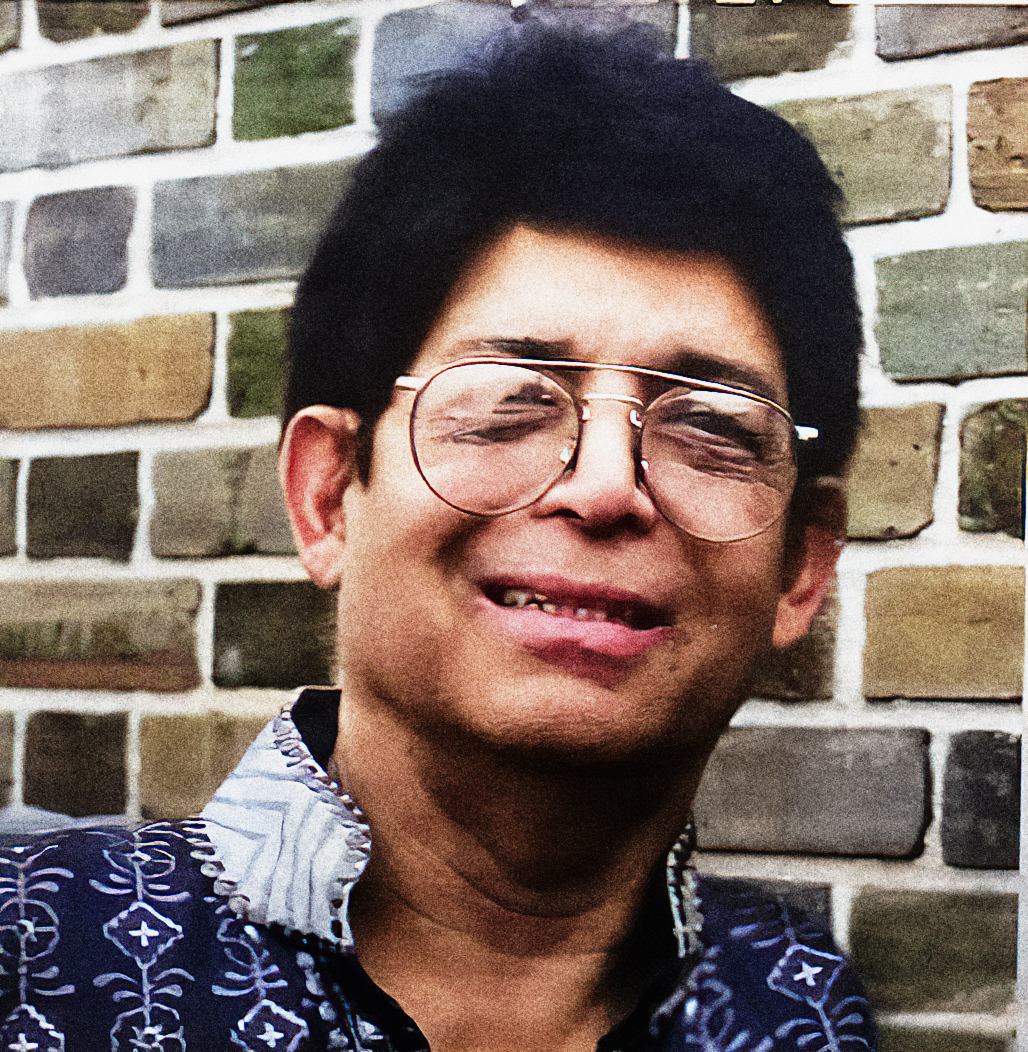
- Born: Faridpur, Pabna, Bangladesh
- Awards: Ekushey Padak

Kaderi Kibria is a Bangladeshi Rabindra Sangeet singer. Kibria was awarded Ekushey Padak in 2013 by the Government of Bangladesh. He had been an active participant in the Swadhin Bangla Betar, during the Liberation War of Bangladesh in 1971.

== Early life and career ==
Kibria was born in Faridpur Upazila in Pabna district of Bangladesh. He received music lessons from Ajit Roy and Debobrato Bishwas. In 1975 he went to Shantiniketan for post-graduation studies in Tagore songs. He was a member of Zinga Shilpi Goshthi. His first TV appearance was in 1967. His first record of two Tagore songs was released In 1969 by HMV.

He moved to United States in 1990s.

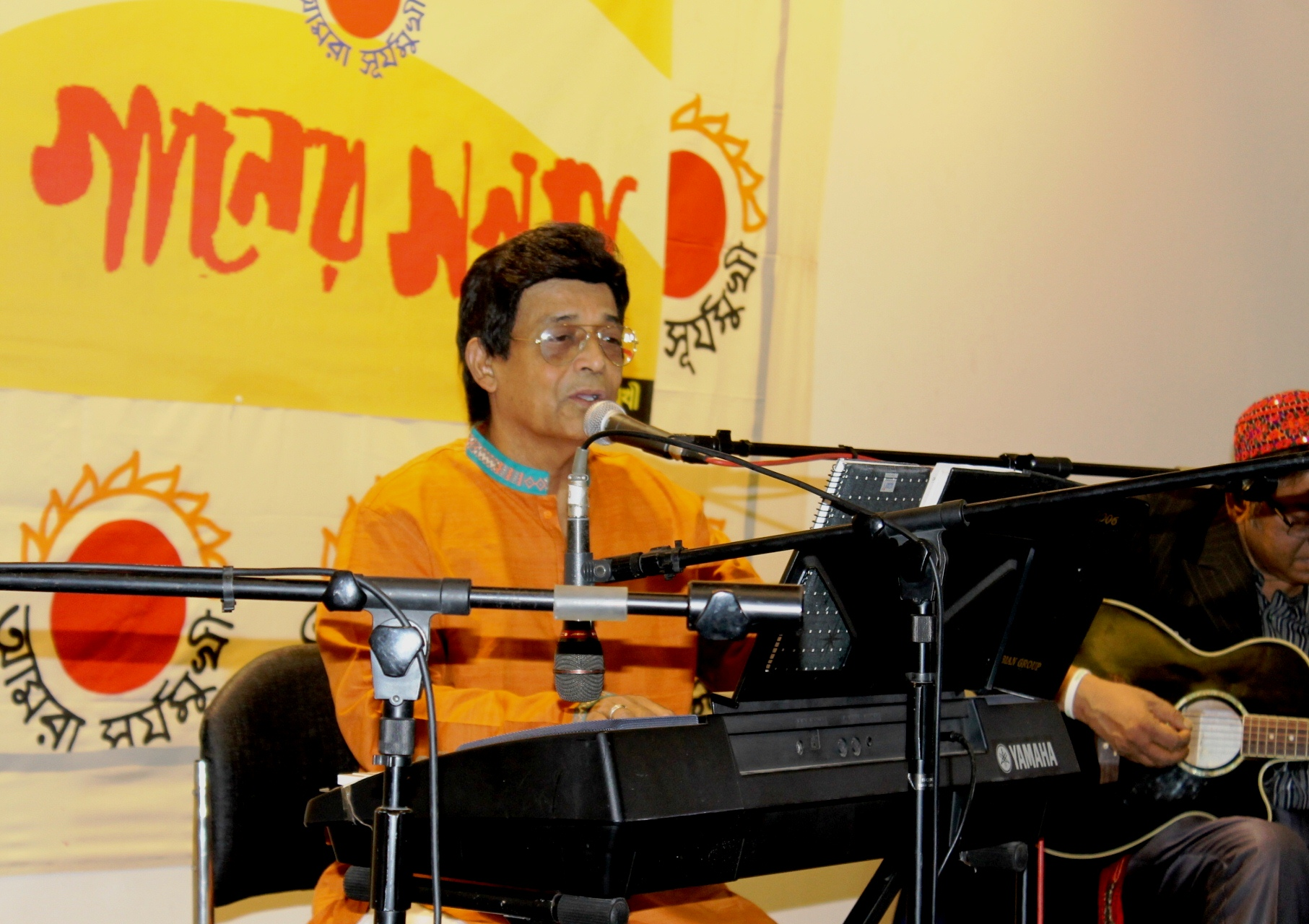
Kaderi Kibria performing solo at Dhaka, 2017

== Discography ==
- Best of Kadri Kibra
- Purono Sei Diner Kotha
- Esho Hey Boishakh

== Awards ==
- Ekushey Padak (2013)
