= Pilu Momtaz =

- Born: c. 1953; Dhaka, East Pakistan
- Died: 23 May 2011(aged 58); Dhaka Bangladesh
- Occupations: Singer-songwriter; musician
- Years active: –
- Spouse: Lieutenant Colonel Anwaruzzaman
- Children: Humayra Zaman Mou
- Father: Ustad Momtaz Ali
- Musical career
- Genres: Pop; Adhunik (modern); Blues rock
- Instrument: Vocals
- Label: Sargam Records

Pilu Momtaz (c. 1953 – 23 May 2011) was a Bangladeshi singer.

== Background and career ==
Momtaz was born in Dhaka. She was the third of seven children born to the Bangladeshi singer Ustad Momtaz Ali. She launched her career in the years immediately following Bangladesh's independence in 1971. Her songs included "Ekdin Tho Choley Jabo", "Chara Gaachh-e Phool Phuitachhey", and "Majhi Nao Chhaira Dey," a song written by Bangladeshi songwriter and poet Jasimuddin.

Her final public performance took place at the 2010 Citycell-Channel i Music Awards. Momtaz took the stage at the awards show with Fakir Alamgir and Ferdous Wahid to perform the song "Ek Second-er Nai Bhorosha", as a tribute to the late singer, Firoz Shai.

== Personal life and death ==
Momtaz had a sister named Dipu Momtaz. Out of 7 sisters, Momtaz was the third sister. She was married to Lieutenant Colonel Anwaruzzaman. Together they had a daughter, Homayra Zaman Mou. Momtaz died from a heart attack at Apollo Hospital in Dhaka on 23 May 2011, at the age of 58.
