= Zafar Iqbal (actor) =

Bangladeshi actor, singer and freedom fighter

- জাফর ইকবাল
- Born: 25 September 1950 (Note: Sources disagree on the dates of Iqbal's birth and death); Dhaka, East Bengal, Dominion of Pakistan
- Died: 8 January 1992 (aged 41)
- Occupations: Actor, singer, guitarist
- Years active: 1970–1992
- Relatives: Shahnaz Rahmatullah (sister); Anwar Parvez (brother)

Zafar Iqbal (born 25 September 1950 – died 8 January 1992) was a Bangladeshi actor, singer and freedom fighter. He acted in 150 films. Singer Shahnaz Rahmatullah and music composer Anwar Parvez were his siblings.

== Background ==
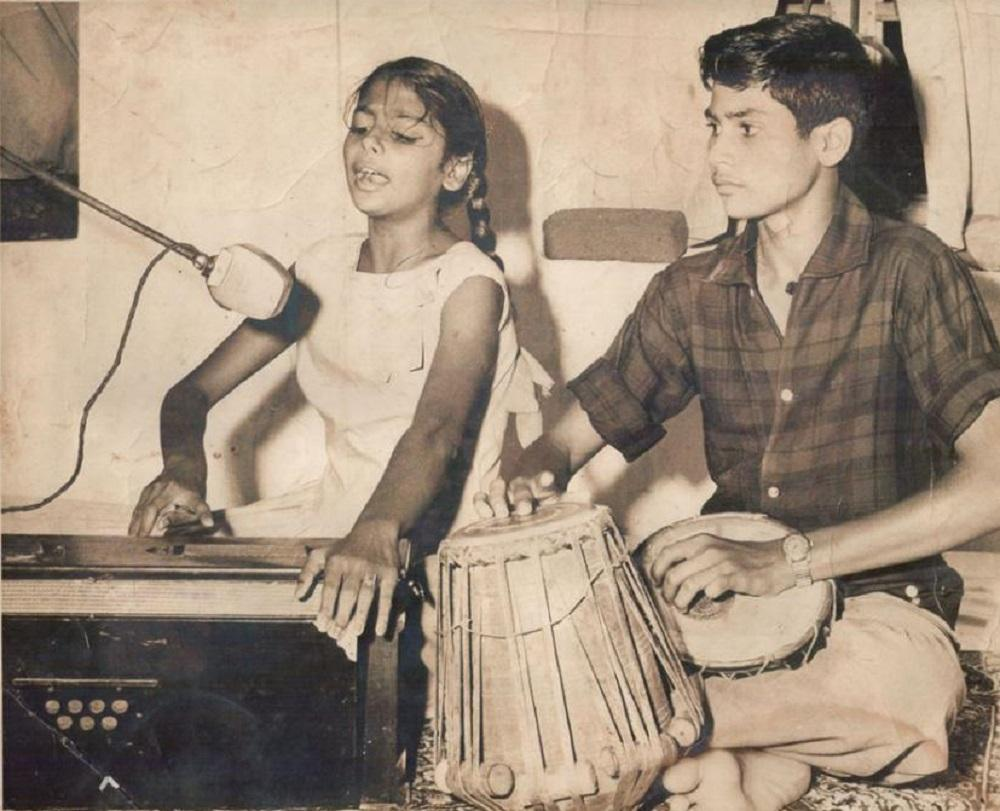
Iqbal with his sister Shahnaz Rahmatullah in the 1960s.

Iqbal learned to play guitar in the 1970s. He formed his own band Rambling Stone in 1966 with two of his friends named Mukit & Akash. The band used to perform regularly at the Hotel Inter-Continental Dacca. Music director Robin Ghosh hired him as a session guitarist for his upcoming film Pitch Dhala Poth. During one of those shows, director Khan Ataur Rahman met Iqbal and offered him work as an actor in a lead role for the film Apan Por .

== Career ==
After the Bangladesh Liberation War, Iqbal started acting regularly from the mid-1970s. He acted in films including Shurjo Shongram, its sequel Shurjo Grahan, Mastan (1975), Bedin, Chor, Ongshidar, Noyoner Alo (1984), Ashirbad, Abishkar, Morjada, Chobol, Shikar, Jogajog, Premik, Shondhi, Akorshon, Obodan, Miss Lanka, Doshi, Shahosh, Gorjon, Kabin, Chorer Bou, Usila, Srodhdha, Shajano Bagan, Bondhu Amar, Lawarish, MohaShotru and Lokhkhir Shongshar. He co-starred with actress Bobita in more than 30 films.

In the mid-1980s, Iqbal released a solo album. He died of liver failure in 1991.

== Personal life and death ==
Iqbal was married to Sonia. Together they had two sons, Shadab and Zain. The eminent singer died on 6 January 1992, due to cancer.

It was rumored that before marrying, he was in a relationship is Bobita.

== Filmography ==
Year	Title	Role	Director	Notes	Ref(s)
1970	Apon Por		Bashir Hossain		
1970	Shadharon Meye	Shahed	E R Khan		
1970	Eki Onge Eto Rup		Mustafiz		
1975	Ferari		Mastofa Anowar		
1975	Bichar				
1975	Dur Theke Kache				
1975	Mastan				
1975	Har Jeet				
1976	Ek Mutho Bhat	Jumman			
1976	Surjo Grohon				
1978	Fakir Maznu Shah				
1984	Noyoner Alo	Jibon	Belal Ahmed		
1984	Premik	Emran	Moinul Hossain		
1986	Protirodh		Fazle Ahmed Benzir		
1986	Prem Biroho		Moynul Hossain		
1987	Bhai Bondhu	Raja	Darashiko		
1987	Opekkha	Noyon/Rajib	Dilip Biswas		
1987	Sondhi	Imran Chowdhury	Gazi Mazharul Anwar		
1988	Jogajog	Zafar Chowdhury	Moynul Hossain		
1989	Abujh Hridoy	Jafor	Mostafa Anwar		
1990	Shontrash	Joy	Shahidul Islam Khokon		
1991	Chorer Bou				
1991	Obodan		Hafizuddin		
1991	Mama Bhagne				
1992	Shonkhonil Karagar	Farid	Mustafizur Rahman		
