= Obaidul Huq =

Bangladeshi journalist and cinematographer

- Born: 31 October 1911; Feni, Noakhali District, Eastern Bengal and Assam, British India
- Died: 13 October 2007 (aged 95); Dhaka, Bangladesh
- Occupations: Journalist, columnist

Obaidul Huq (31 October 1911 – 13 October 2007) was a Bangladeshi journalist, cinematographer, playwright and writer. He was awarded Ekushey Padak in 1981 by the Government of Bangladesh.

== Early life and education ==
Obaidul Huq was born to Bazlul Huq Khan and Anjuman Nessa on 31 October 1911 at Feni in Noakhali. His father was a lawyer at Feni and a Member of the Bengal Provincial Legislative Assembly. Obaidul Huq did his master's degree in philosophy and psychology in 1934 and obtained a law degree in 1936 from the University of Dhaka.

== Career ==
Huq joined the Pakistan Observer in 1951 as joint editor and after the independence of Bangladesh in 1971 he joined The Bangladesh Observer as the editor. Later, he worked as a columnist and regular contributor to different dailies.

== Personal life ==
Obaidul Huq had four sons: Mashuqul Huq, Arham Masudul Huq. Anjam Maruf, Sazzad Zabir and three daughters: Salma Ahsan, Asma Huq and Naima Huq. Syeda Rumana Tahmeen, Syeda Rumana Tasleem, Syeda Rumana Tasneem, Syed Jamil Ahsan, Imran Asif, Asfia Farheen Huq Toma, Sadia Farzana, Samia Farzana, Nafisul Huq, Rafida Maruf Choity, Faseeha Zabir Shuchi, Nasiba Zabir Shoily and Farha Adiba Hoque are among his grand children.

== Filmography ==
Year	Film	Language	Release date	Note
1946	Dukhe Jader Jibon Gora	Bengali		Directorial debut, First film in Tollywood directed by a Bengali Muslim, credited as "Himadri Choudhury"
1964	Dui Diganta	Bengali		

== Awards ==
- Bangla Academy Literary Award (1964)
- Ekushey Padak (1981)
- UNICEF Gold Medal (1983)
- Abdus Salam Gold Medal
- Zahur Hossain Gold Medal
- Kazi Mahbubullah and Begum Zebunnessa Trust Gold Medal
- Atisha Dipankar prize
- Millenium Award (2002)
- Hiralal Sen prize (2003)
