= Aradhona =

Bangladeshi film

- Directed by: Raju Siraj
- Screenplay by: Bulbul Ahmed
- Starring: Sharmili Ahmed; Kabari; Bulbul Ahmed
- Music by: Alam Khan
- Release date: 2 February 1979
- Country: Bangladesh
- Language: Bengali

Aradhona (Bengali: আরাধনা; English: The Worship) is a 1979 Bangladeshi film starring Kabari, Bulbul Ahmed and Sharmili Ahmed. Abdus Sabur garnered a Bangladesh National Film Award for Best Art Direction.

== Cast ==
- Sharmili Ahmed
- Bulbul Ahmed
- Kabari

== Track listing ==
The music was composed by Alam Khan and written by Mukul Chowdhury. The songs were sung by Shammi Akhtar, Sabina Yasmin, Khurshid Alam and Indramohan Rajbongshi.

Song	Writer	Composer	Singer
"Ami Tomar Bodhu"	Mukul Chowdhury	Alam Khan	Shammi Akhtar
"Tumi Bole Dakle"	Mukul Chowdhury	Alam Khan	Khurshid Alam
"Ami Na Janlam"	Mukul Chowdhury	Alam Khan	Indramohan Rajbongshi
"Chithi Diyo (version 1)"	Mukul Chowdhury	Alam Khan	Shammi Akhtar
"Chithi Diyo (version 2)"	Mukul Chowdhury	Alam Khan	Sabina Yasmin

== Awards ==
Bangladesh National Film Awards

- Best Art Director - Abdus Sobur
