= Shahnaz Rahmatullah =

Pakistani and later Bangladeshi singer (1952–2019)

- শাহনাজ রহমতুল্লাহ
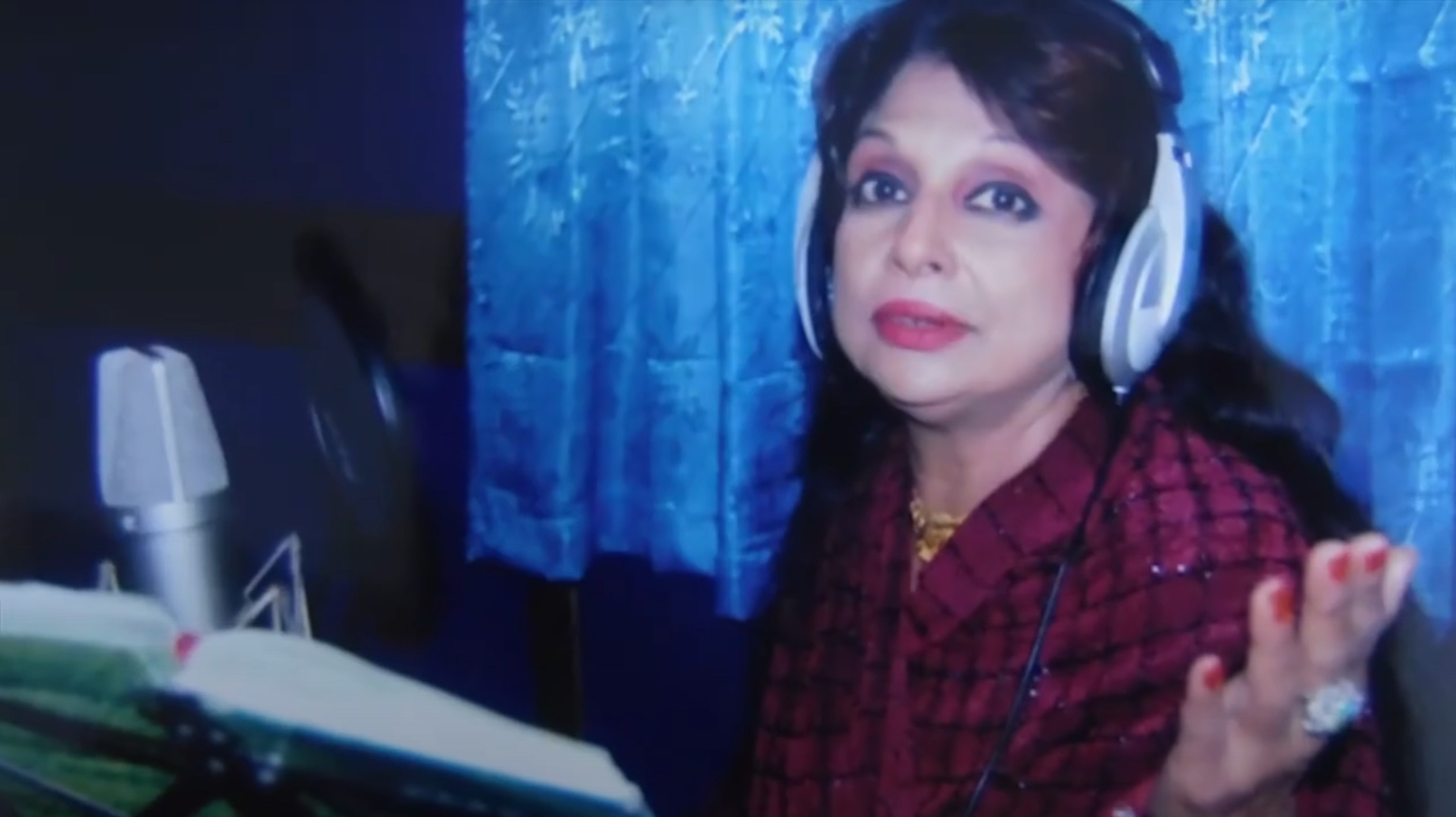
- Born: Shahnaz Begum; 2 January 1952; Dhaka, East Bengal, Dominion of Pakistan
- Died: 23 March 2019 (aged 67); Dhaka, Bangladesh
- Citizenship: Bangladeshi
- Occupation: Playback singer
- Years active: 1962–2012
- Family: Zafar Iqbal (brother); Anwar Parvez (brother)
- Awards: full list

Shahnaz Rahmatullah (née Begum; 2 January 1952 – 23 March 2019) was a Bangladeshi Bengali singer.

Her notable songs are Sohni Dharti Allah Rakhay, Prothom Bangladesh Amar Sesh Bangladesh, Ekbar Jete De Na Amar Chotto Sonar Gaye, Je Chilo Drishtir Shimanay and Ek Tara Tui Desher Kotha. She was the recipient of the Ekushey Padak in 1992 and Bangladesh National Film Award for Best Female Playback Singer for the film Chhutir Phande (1990).

== Background ==
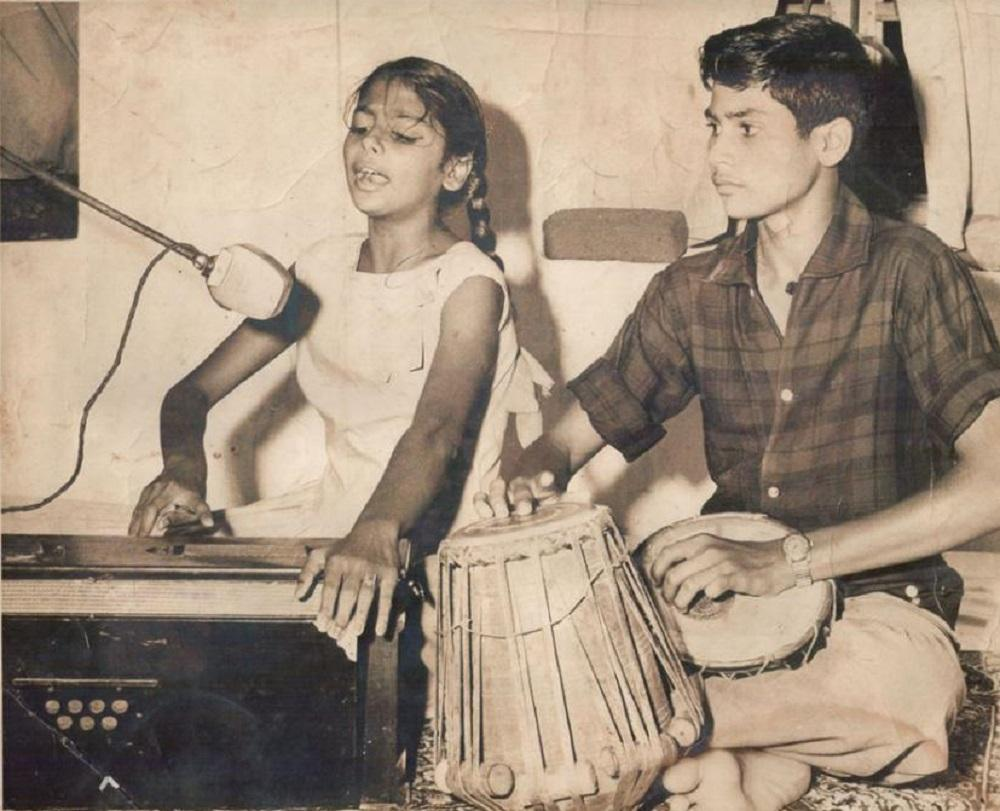
Rahmatullah with her brother Zafar Iqbal in the 1960s.

Rahmatullah was born on 2 January 1952 as Shahnaz Begum in Dhaka to M Fazlul Haq and Asiya Haq. Actor Zafar Iqbal and music director Anwar Parvez were Rahmatullah's brothers. She was trained by ghazal maestro Mehedi Hassan, Ustad Phul Mohammad, Ustad Munir Hossain and Altaf Mahmud.

Rahmatullah was married to Maj (retd) Abul Bashar Rahmatullah.

== Career ==
Rahmatullah debuted in singing at the age of 11, as a playback singer for the film Notun Sur (1963). She first performed on television in 1964. She sang in Bangladeshi and Pakistani films. She mostly sang modern (Adhunik Gaan) and patriotic songs. In the late 1960s and early 1970s, she sang patriotic songs such as Sohni Dharti Allah Rakhe and Jeevay Jeevay Pakistan. She released an album with Samina Chowdhury called Megh Roddur on which she sang six songs composed by Shafiq Tuhin. She released four albums in total.

Four of Rahmatullah's songs were selected in a BBC survey of 20 greatest Bangla songs of all time.

Rahmatullah died on 23 March 2019 of a heart attack at her residence in Baridhara, aged 67.

Pakistani journalist, Hamid Mir said, "Shahnaz Begum passed away in Bangladesh on March 23 when many Pakistanis were listening to her famous song Sohni Dharti Allah Rakhay on Pakistan Day."

== Works ==
Films

- Notun Sur (1962)
- Abar Tora Manush Ho (1973)
- Ghuddi (1975)

Albums

- Badal Diner Pakhi

== Film songs ==
Year	Film	Song	Composer(s)	Songwriter(s)	Co-artist(s)
1966	Bhawal Sanyasi	"Sokhi Amar Elo Mrigayay"	Satya Saha	Zia Haider	Anjuman Ara Begum
1966	Daak Babu	"Holud Baato, Mehndi Baato"	Ali Hossain	Mohammad Moniruzzaman	chorus
1968	Balyobondu	"Pakhir Kakoli Theme Gelo"	Anwaruddin Khan	Amjad Hossain	solo
1968	Saat Bhai Champa	"O Saat Bhai Champa Jaago Re"	Amir Ali	Khan Ataur Rahman	solo
1969	Agantuk	"Ami Je Kebol Bolei Choli"	Azad Rahman	Dr. Abu Haider Sajedur Rahman	Mahmudun Nabi
1969	Agantuk	"Olira Gun Gun Gunguniye"	Azad Rahman	Dr. Abu Haider Sajedur Rahman	solo
1969	Mukti	"Tumi Asbe Ei Logone"	Karim Shahbuddin	Gazi Mazharul Anwar	solo
1969	Naginir Prem	"Bondhur Poth Cheye"	Mansur Ahmed	Nurul Islam Lal	solo
1969	Patalpurir Rajkonya	"Aji Patalpurite Uthal Pathal Uthechhe"	Mansur Ahmed	Nurul Islam Lal	chorus
1969	Shaheed Titumir (Urdu)	"Laaye Hain Husn Ka"	Mansur Ahmed	Fayyaz Hashmi	Sabina Yasmin
1970	Anka Banka	"Anuraage Gaane Gaane"	Altaf Mahmud	Gazi Mazharul Anwar	solo
1970	Bablu	"Amar Chhotto Bhaiti"	Karim Shahabuddin	Gazi Mazharul Anwar	solo
1970	Binimoy	"Dekha Nei, Dekha Holo"	Satya Saha	Gazi Mazharul Anwar	solo
1970	Ekoi Ange Eto Roop	"Jibone Rong Chirodin Robe Na"	Ali Hossain	Mohammad Moniruzzaman	solo
1970	Koto Je Minoti	"Ami Gaanke Bhalobeschhi"	Anwar Parvez	Gazi Mazharul Anwar	solo
1970	Koto Je Minoti	"Amar Koto Gaan Chhilo Je"	Anwar Parvez	Gazi Mazharul Anwar	solo
1970	Koto Je Minoti	"Tumi Saat Sagorer Opar Hote"	Anwar Parvez	Gazi Mazharul Anwar	Abdul Jabbar
1970	Modhu Milon	"Adhare Alo Hoye"	Bashir Ahmed	Syed Shamsul Haque, Masud Karim, Shahidul Islam	Bashir Ahmed
1970	Nupur	"Laaj Laage Mor Sokhi"	Karim Shahabuddin	S. M. Hedayet	Sabina Yasmin
1970	Peech Dhala Poth	"Phooler Kaane Bhromor Ese"	Robin Ghosh	Mohammad Moniruzzaman	solo
1970	Rong Bodlay	"O Pakhi Re"	Satya Saha	Gazi Mazharul Anwar	solo
1972	Anowara	"Allahumma Salli Aala Muhammad"	Khandaker Nurul Alam	Abdul Latif	solo
1972	Bahram Badshah	"Hay Hay Mori Joubon Jaala Re"		Gazi Mazharul Anwar, M A Kashem, Osman Khan	solo
1972	Ehsaas (Urdu)	"Ruk Jao, Abhi Mat Jao"	Robin Ghosh		Ahmad Rushdi
1973	Abar Tora Manush Ho	"Ek Nodi Rokto Periye"	Khan Ataur Rahman	Khan Ataur Rahman	solo
1975	Aponjon	"Slamalekum, Keno Eto Deri Holo?"	Ali Hossain	Gazi Mazharul Anwar	Khurshid Alam
1977	Kuasha	"Bondhu Amay Rekho Shudhu"	Azad Rahman	Gazi Mazharul Anwar, Jebunnisa Jamal, Ahmed Zaman Chowdhury	Mahmudun Nabi
1980	Ghuddi	"Ghum Ghum Chokhe"	Lucky Akhand	Kausar Ahmed Chaudhury	solo
1983	Sakkhi	"Parina Bhule Jete"	Alauddin Ali	Gazi Mazharul Anwar	solo
1990	Chhutir Phande	"Sagorer Soikote"	Anwar Parvez	Shahidul Haque Khan	solo
1995	Muktir Songram	"Ek Nodi Rokto Periye" (part 1)	Ahmed Imtiaz Bulbul	Uttam Akash	solo
1995	Muktir Songram	"Ek Nodi Rokto Periye" (part 2)	Ahmed Imtiaz Bulbul	Uttam Akash	solo
1995	Muktir Songram	"Phooler Kane Bhromor Ese"	Ahmed Imtiaz Bulbul	Uttam Akash	solo

== Non-film songs ==
Year	Album	Song	Composer(s)	Songwriter(s)	Co-artist(s)
N/A	Single	"Sagorer Teer Theke"	Anwar Parvez		solo

== Songs for television ==
Year	Show	Song	Composer(s)	Songwriter(s)	Co-artist(s)
N/A	Single	"Mayadore Bnadha Poira"	Mansur Ahmed	Nurul Islam	Abdul Alim
1978	Bangladesh Television	"Prothom Bangladesh Amar Shesh Bangladesh"	Alauddin Ali	Moniruzzaman Monir	solo
N/A	Anandamela	"Je Chhilo Drishtir Simanay"	Alauddin Ali	Nazrul Islam Babu	solo

== Awards ==
- President's Pride of Performance Medal (1965)
- Ekushey Padak (1992)
- Bangladesh National Film Award for Best Female Playback Singer (1990)
- Bangladesh Shilpakala Academy Award
- Bangladesh Chalachitra Sangbadik Samity Award
