= Abdullah al Mamun (playwright) =

Bangladeshi writer, actor and filmmaker

Abdullah Al Mamun
- আবদুল্লাহ আল মামুন
- Born: 13 July 1942; Jamalpur, Bengal Presidency, British India
- Died: 21 August 2008 (aged 66); Dhaka, Bangladesh
- Education: MA (history) University of Dhaka
- Occupations: Film director; actor; playwright
- Spouse: Farida Khatun (m. 1984, died)
- Awards: Ekushey Padak; Bangla Academy Literary Award

Abdullah Al Mamun (13 July 1942 – 21 August 2008) was a Bangladeshi playwright, actor, and filmmaker. He earned the Bangla Academy Literary Award in 1978 and the Ekushey Padak in 2000 from the Government of Bangladesh. As a filmmaker, he won Bangladesh National Film Award for Best Director twice for the direction of the films Ekhoni Somoy (1980) and Dui Jibon (1988).

== Early life and education ==
Mamun was born on 13 July 1942 in Jamalpur District. He completed his bachelor's and master's degrees in history from the University of Dhaka. He wrote in his memoirs Aamar Kotha, which was serially published in the fortnightly Tarokalok, "When I first got admitted in the Dhaka University, I turned to Najmul Huda Bacchu vai to get a chance in theatre. He took me to Natyaguru Nurul Momen. Hearing that besides acting, I write plays also, Momen Sir asked me, 'Have you read Bernard Shaw?' He cast me in his next play. That was my beginning. Since then I never had to look back". In 1950, he wrote his first stage play, Niyotir Parihas. Subsequently, under the guidance of Muneir Chowdhury, he further developed his skills as a playwright, director, and actor.

== Career ==
Since 1965, Mamun was associated with Pakistan Television (PTV), later renamed Bangladesh Television (BTV). He wrote 25 dramas, seven novels, an autobiography titled Amar Ami, and a travelogue titled Manhattan. His literature mostly depicts the middle-class lifestyle of Bangladesh. His notable plays include Ekhono Kritadas, Tomrai, Amader Sontanera, Kokilara, Bibisab, Meraj Fakirer Maa, Mayik Master, Songsoptok, Pathar Somoy, Jibon Chhobi, and Baba. He was a founding member and playwright-director of the theatre troupe Theatre.

Mamun was also a filmmaker. He made his debut as a filmmaker with Angikar in 1972. His other notable films include Sareng Bou (1978), Ekhoni Somoy, Dui Jibon, Sokhi Tumi Kar, and Bihanga. He wrote stories and songs for films including "Oshikkhito". His last films, Doriya Parer Doulati and Dui Beayar Kirti, were released in 2010 and 2015 respectively.

Mamun joined BTV as a producer in 1966 and retired in 1991 as a director. He served director general of the National Institute of Mass Communication (NIMCO) and director general of Bangladesh Shilpakala Academy.

== Death ==
Mamun was suffering from acute coronary syndrome along with diabetes, hypertension, kidney and liver complexities. He died on 21 August 2008.

== Works ==
Theatre plays

- Spordha
- Meraj Fakirer Ma
- Mayik Master
- Ekhon Dusshomoy
- Shopoth
- Bibishab
- Shenapoti
- Shubochon Nirbashone
- Tritiyo Purush
- Ekhono Kritodash
- Aaina-e Bondhur Mukh
- Payer Awaj Pawa Jae

Films

- Sareng Bou (1978)
- Sokhi Tumi Kar (1980)
- Dui Jibon (1988)
- Bihanga (1999)
- Tumi Acho Hridoye (2007) as Tina's father
- Doriya Parer Doulati (2010)
- Dui Beayar Kirti (2015)

Television plays

- Shubachan Nirbashaney
- Ekhon Dushomoy
- Shapath
- Meherjaan Arekbar
- Songsoptok (1971)
- Shirshabindu
- Jibon Chhobi
- Uttaradhikar

== Awards ==
- Bangla Academy Literary Award (1978)
- Ekushey Padak (2000)
- Bangladesh Television Award
- Alakta Sahitya Purashkar
- Tarokalok Padak
