= Abdul Karim Shah =

Bangladeshi baul singer

- আবদুল করিম শাহ
- Born: 1927 or 1928; Anjangachi Village, Mirpur Upazila, Kushtia, British India
- Died: 10 June 2014 (aged 86); Canalpara,Chourhas, Kushtia, Bangladesh
- Spouse: Rizia Khatun

Abdul Karim Shah (known as Baul Abdul Karim Shah; c. 1927 – 10 June 2014) was a Bangladeshi baul singer. He was awarded the Ekushey Padak in 2011 for his contribution to arts by the Government of Bangladesh.

== Awards ==
Ekushey Padak (2011)
