= Abida Sultana =

Bangladeshi singer

- আবিদা সুলতানা
- Sultana in 2026
- Other name: Shikha
- Spouse: Rafiqul Alam (m. 1980)
- Relatives: Shawkat Ali Emon (brother)

Abida Sultana is a Bangladeshi adhunik singer.

== Early life and career ==
Sultana was born to Abdus Salam and Muslima Begum. She got her musical breakthrough in 1974. She performed as a playback singer for the films Abar Tora Manush Ho (1973), Alo Tumi Aleya and Yea Kore Biye. She was one of the playback singers of the film Simana Periye (1977), composed by Bhupen Hazarika.

Sultana can render songs in 32 languages.

Sultana was awarded by Bangladesh Performing Media Centre (BPMC) in 2008.

== Personal life ==
Sultana is married to the musician Rafiqul Alam since 14 April 1980. Their one son, Farshid Alam, is the main vocalist of the band Bohemian. She has four sisters, Rebeka Sultana, Rehena Sultana, Chitra Sultana and Salma Sultana, and two brothers, Shawkat Ali Emon and Mohammad Ali Shumon. Salma (d. 2016) was a singer.

== Notable songs ==
- Tumi Cheyechile Ogo Jante
- Eki Badhone Bolo Jorale
- Ami Sath Sagor Pari Diye
- Bimurto Ei Ratri Amar
- Noyone Rekhe Noyon Kore
- Ekta Dolna Jadi
- Hiroyer Duri Achena Nadi
- Harjit Chirodini Thakbe
- Hate Thak Duti Haath
- Madhu Chandrimar Ai Raat
- Rongila Pakhire
- Ami Jotishir Kase Jabo

== Bengali songs ==
=== Film songs ===
Year	Film	Song	Composer(s)	Songwriter(s)	Co-artist(s)
1973	Abar Tora Manush Ho	"Tumi Cheyechhile Ogo Jante"	Khan Ataur Rahman	Khan Ataur Rahman	solo
1973	Dasyurani	"Mon Chay Tor Mondare"	Dheer Ali Mansur	Sirajul Islam Bhuiyan	Sabina Yasmin
1973	Iye Kore Biye	"Bhalobashar Mulyo Je Ki"	Amir Ali	Masud Karim	solo
1977	Simana Periye	"Bimurto Ei Raatri Amar"	Bhupen Hazarika	Shibdas Bandyopadhyay	solo
1977	Simana Periye	"Aaj Jyotsna Raate"	Bhupen Hazarika	Shibdas Bandyopadhyay	solo
1977	Trishna	"Na Na Parbona Re"	Satya Saha	Gazi Mazharul Anwar	Subir Nandi
1977	Ujjol Surjer Niche	"Ki Hote Ki, Hoye Gechhe"	Subal Das	Ahmed Zaman Chowdhury	solo
1977	Ujjol Surjer Niche	"Ujjol Surjer Niche"	Subal Das	Ahmed Zaman Chowdhury	chorus
1980	Chhutir Ghonta	"Amader Deshta Shopnopuri"	Satya Saha	Gazi Mazharul Anwar	solo
1980	Taj O Talwar	"Noyone Rekhe Noyon"	Mansur Ahmed	Masud Karim	solo
1981	Nagin	"Chompa Duli Naam Amader"	Deboo Bhattacharya	Sheikh Nazrul Islam	Sabina Yasmin
1985	Soti Naag Konya	"Nach Re Konya Nach"	Ahmed Imtiaz Bulbul		Sabina Yasmin, chorus
1987	Bosonto Maloti	"O Majhi Bhai, Amar Poysa Kori Nai"	Ahmed Imtiaz Bulbul	Ahmed Imtiaz Bulbul	Andrew Kishore
1989	Alal Dulal	"Dulalre Aage Mairona"	Ahmed Imtiaz Bulbul	Ahmed Imtiaz Bulbul	solo
1989	Alal Dulal	"Ki Kotha Shunaila Go Sordar"	Ahmed Imtiaz Bulbul	Ahmed Imtiaz Bulbul	Mina Barua
1990	Sotiputro Abdullah	"Ami Karo Apon Holam Na"	Ahmed Imtiaz Bulbul	Ahmed Imtiaz Bulbul	Sabina Yasmin
1991	Shoshurbari	"Sokhi Amar Jay Re Shoshurbari" (sad)	Satya Saha	Ahmed Zaman Chowdhury	solo
1994	Chand Kumari Chashar Chhele	"Sara Ange Jouboner Dheu" (part 1)	Ahmed Imtiaz Bulbul	Ahmed Imtiaz Bulbul	Shakila Zafar
1994	Chand Kumari Chashar Chhele	"Sara Ange Jouboner Dheu" (part 2)	Ahmed Imtiaz Bulbul	Ahmed Imtiaz Bulbul	Shakila Zafar
1995	Adorer Sontan	"Ami Moilam Moilam"	Alauddin Ali	Amjad Hossain	M A Khalek
1995	Lalu Sordar	"Norom Norom Kolijate"	Satya Saha	Gazi Mazharul Anwar	solo
N/A	Usila	"Ore Phool Debo, Bichha Debo"	Ali Hossain	Nazrul Islam Babu	Subir Nandi
N/A	Usila	"Nacho, Gaao, Phurti Koro"	Ali Hossain	Nazrul Islam Babu	Khurshid Alam
