= Amirul Islam (lyricist) =

Bangladeshi film lyricist and actor

- আমিরুল ইসলাম
- Born: Kushtia, Khulna, Bangladesh
- Occupations: Film lyricist, actor
- Years active: 1997–present
- Notable work: Bapjaner Bioscope
- Awards: National Film Award (1st time)

Amirul Islam is a Bangladeshi film lyricist and actor. He won Bangladesh National Film Award for Best Lyrics for the film Bapjaner Bioscope (2015).

== Filmography ==
=== As a film lyricist ===
- Bapjaner Bioscope - 2015

=== As a film actor ===
- Helener Chokhe Bangladesh -
- Princh of Bengal -
- Lalon -
- Kanna -
- Bapjaner Bioscope - 2015
- Nodijon - 2015
- Sonadip -

=== As a drama actor ===
- Kon Simanay Mukti
- Arshi Nagar
- Tevaga -
- Tero Kahon
- It Kather Khasa
- Nil Nirjone
- Choddo Frem
- Barota Beje Pas
- Ekti Sadharo Premer Golpo
- Ghore Fera
- Nurjahan

== Awards and nominations ==
National Film Awards

Year	Award	Category	Film	Result
2015	National Film Award	Best Lyrics	Bapjaner Bioscope	Won
