= Azam Khan (singer) =

Bangladeshi singer-songwriter, composer and freedom fighter (1950–2011)

- আজম খান
- Born: Mahbubul Haque Khan; 28 February 1950; Dhaka, East Pakistan, Dominion of Pakistan
- Died: 5 June 2011 (aged 61); Dhaka, Bangladesh
- Resting place: Martyred Intellectuals' Graveyard, Mirpur, Dhaka
- Other name: Pop Samrat, The Rock Guru
- Education: T & T College
- Occupations: Singer-songwriter; record producer; actor
- Years active: 1967–2011
- Spouse: Sahida Begum (m. 1981; div. 1993)
- Children: 3
- Relatives: Alam Khan (brother)
- Awards: Ekushey Padak
- Musical career
- Genres: Pop; Rock and roll
- Instruments: Vocal; guitar
- Labels: Soundtek; Sonali; CD Sounds; Sargam; Sangeeta; D-Series

Mahbubul Haque Khan (28 February 1950 – 5 June 2011), known professionally as Azam Khan, was a Bangladeshi singer-songwriter, record producer, and the lead singer of the pioneering pop-rock band Uchcharon. Widely referred to as the "Pop Samrat" (Emperor of Pop) and "The Rock Guru", he is considered a founding figure of Bangladeshi rock and one of the most influential artists in the history of Bangladeshi popular music.

Born and raised in Dhaka, Khan began his musical career in the late 1960s. He was an active participant in the 1969 mass uprising and later fought as a freedom fighter during the 1971 Liberation War of Bangladesh.

Following the war, Khan established Uchcharon and achieved widespread commercial success throughout the 1970s with enduring hits such as "Rail Liner Oi Bostite", "Alal ar Dulal", "Saleka Maleka", and "Papri Keno Bojhena". In recognition of his significant contributions to the music industry, he was posthumously awarded the Independence Award, Bangladesh's highest civilian honour, in 2025.

== Early life and education ==
Khan was born on 28 February 1950 in Azimpur, Dhaka to Aftabuddin Khan and Jobeda Begum. They used to live in the No. 10 Government Quarter Colony. His father was the administrative officer of Secretariat Home Department, as well as a homeopathic doctor. His mother was a singer, a source of his passion for music. He had three brothers — Sayeed Khan, Alam Khan, Leyakot Ali Khan and a sister – Shamima Akhter Khanom. In 1956, his father built a house in Kamalapur. He was admitted to Motijheel Provincial School. In 1965, he was admitted to Siddheswari Boys' High School in the commercial division, from where he passed the Secondary School Certificate exam in 1968.

He enrolled in T & T College in 1970, but his studies were interrupted by his participation in the Liberation War alongside his father and siblings.

== Participation in liberation war ==
In 1969, Khan took part in the mass uprising in East Pakistan (Public Awakening, গণঅভ্যুত্থান) against the West Pakistan government. He was a member of the Trinity Artist Group (ক্রান্তি শিল্পী গোষ্ঠী). He would compose songs against Pakistani leaders. In 1971, his father Aftabuddin became the senior officer of the secretariat. His father inspired him and his brothers to join the war. At the age of 21, he and two friends traveled to Agartala on foot with the goal of serving under major Khaled Mosharraf in Sector 2. After training Melaghar Camp in India, Khan fought against the Pakistani army in Comilla. He first fought in Saldah and Agartala before being sent to Dhaka to take part in the ongoing guerrilla war against Pakistan. Khan served under section commander Khaled Mosharraf on a guerilla team known as Crack Platoon. He took part in several guerrilla attacks in Dhaka and the surrounding areas and was promoted to section commander. Khan was responsible for managing guerrilla operations within the Jatrabari-Gulshan area. The most notable of these was "Operation Titas" under his leadership. Their mission was to destroy gas pipelines supplying Dhaka. A primary target were pipes supplying the Hotel Intercontinental (Now Sheraton Hotel). Their goal was to disrupt foreigners staying in those hotels in order to raise awareness of the war. During the conflict, he was hit in his left ear, which damaged his hearing. His section managed to defeat members of the Pakistani army in a battle organized in Trimohani, near Madartek. Azam Khan entered Dhaka with his accomplices in mid-December 1971.

== Career ==
After the war, he was able to return to his aspirations of music. He founded the band Uchcharan in 1972. Guitarist Rocket then joined the band. Khan's first appearance in music was Spondon's musical program and performance on Bangladesh Television, in DIT Building in Dhaka with rock singers like Nasir Ahmed Apu, Firoz Shai. Guitarist Mansur, Congo player Naseem of Spandan. The program was directed by Mansur Ahmed Nipu of Spandan and produced by Noazesh Ali Khan of BTV. His rock band earned instant reputation and Azam Khan came to be known as the "Rock Guru". Some of his biggest hits are "Ore Saleka, Ore Maleka", "Jibone Kichhu Pabona Re", "Ami Jare Chaire", "Ashi Ashi Bole Tumi", "Obhimani", "Rail liner bostite", "Hei Allah Hei Allah Re", "Alal O Dulal".

He was also a cricketer, having played in Dhaka's second division league as late as 1998, when he was around 48.

== Personal life ==
Khan married Sahida Begum in 1981. Together they had two daughters, Ima Khan and Aroni Khan, and a son, Hridoy Khan.

== Death ==
Khan died on 5 June 2011 at Dhaka Combined Military Hospital at the age of 61. He was suffering from oral cancer which had spread to his lungs. In 2013, his family established "Azam Khan Foundation" aiming to help impoverished artists.

Khan, along with his contemporaries Fakir Alamgir, Ferdous Wahid, Pilu Momtaz, Firoz Shai and Nazma Zaman is credited with pioneering popular music in Bangladesh. About his career, pop singer Habib Wahid said, "the history of Bangladeshi rock music began with Azam Khan. His songs were very popular in the post-independence Bangladesh, and they haven't lost their appeal at all." Female rock artist Mila Islam said, "Azam Khan introduced the genre rock and roll to Bangladeshi people." Indie musician Shayan Chowdhury Arnob said, "He is not among us anymore, but his songs will keep his spirit alive. He'll live forever through his music."

== Influences ==
His influences included famous Indian singers such as Kishore Kumar, Hemanta Mukherjee, Manna Dey, as well as British rock bands The Beatles and The Rolling Stones. He was particularly intrigued by George Harrison, whose 1971 Concert for Bangladesh sought to rally support for the liberation army in the West.

== Awards ==
- Best Pop Singer Award (1993)
- Television Audience Award in 2002
- Lifetime Achievement Award
- Award of Council of Urban Guerilla
- Dhaka '71 and Freedom Fighter Award from Radio Today
- Ekushey Padak (2019)
- Independence Award (2025)

== Discography ==
- Arrogant
- Frustration
- Alal and Dulal
- On the Earth
- Bangladesh"
- Something to Ask
- Granny
- I Have No One
- Blue Eyes
- It's Burning
- In the Slum Beside the Rail Line
- Salam to You, Guru (2011)
- Saleka Maleka (2017)

== Filmography ==
- Hiramani (1986)
- Godfather (1993)
