= Robi Chowdhury =

Bangladeshi singer

Rabi Chowdhury
- রবী চৌধুরী
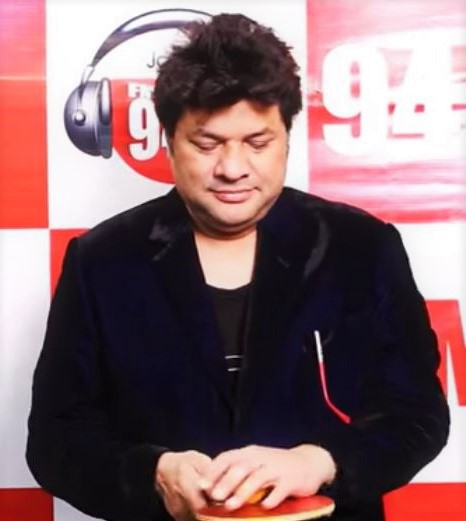
- Born: Rabi Chowdhury; 17 December; Banshkhali, Chattogram Bangladesh
- Occupations: Singer; Musician
- Years active: 1985–present
- Spouse(s): Dolly Sayontoni (m. 2001, divorced) Paryel Samiha Sharika (divorced); Rifat Ara Ramiza (m. 2015)
- Children: 2 daughters
- Musical career
- Genres: Indian Film Pop
- Instruments: Harmonium; vocals
- Labels: G-Series; Soundtek; Sangeeta Music
- Website: facebook.com/rabichdhury

Rabi Chowdhury is a Bangladeshi singer, who gained popularity in the 1990s as a background score for films. As of February 2019, he has released 64 audio albums. He was also a playback singer in 70 to 80 Bangladeshi films.

== Personal life ==
Rabi Chowdhury was married thrice. He married Rifat Ara Ramiza on 14 February 2015. The couple has one daughter. He was previously married to musician Dolly Sayontoni and Paryel Samiha Sharika but eventually divorced.

== Musical career ==
Rabi Chowdhury's first audio album was released by a company called 'Selex'. He also lent his voice to film songs and also composed music for several films. His first film as a music director was 'Andolan' and his last film was 'Putra Nak Paisawala'. He owns Rimzhim Studio.

Robi has said that singer Khalid Hasan Milu (who was friends with his cousin) helped him with the start of his career.
