= Mehreen Mahmud =

Bangladeshi Singer

Mehreen মেহরীন
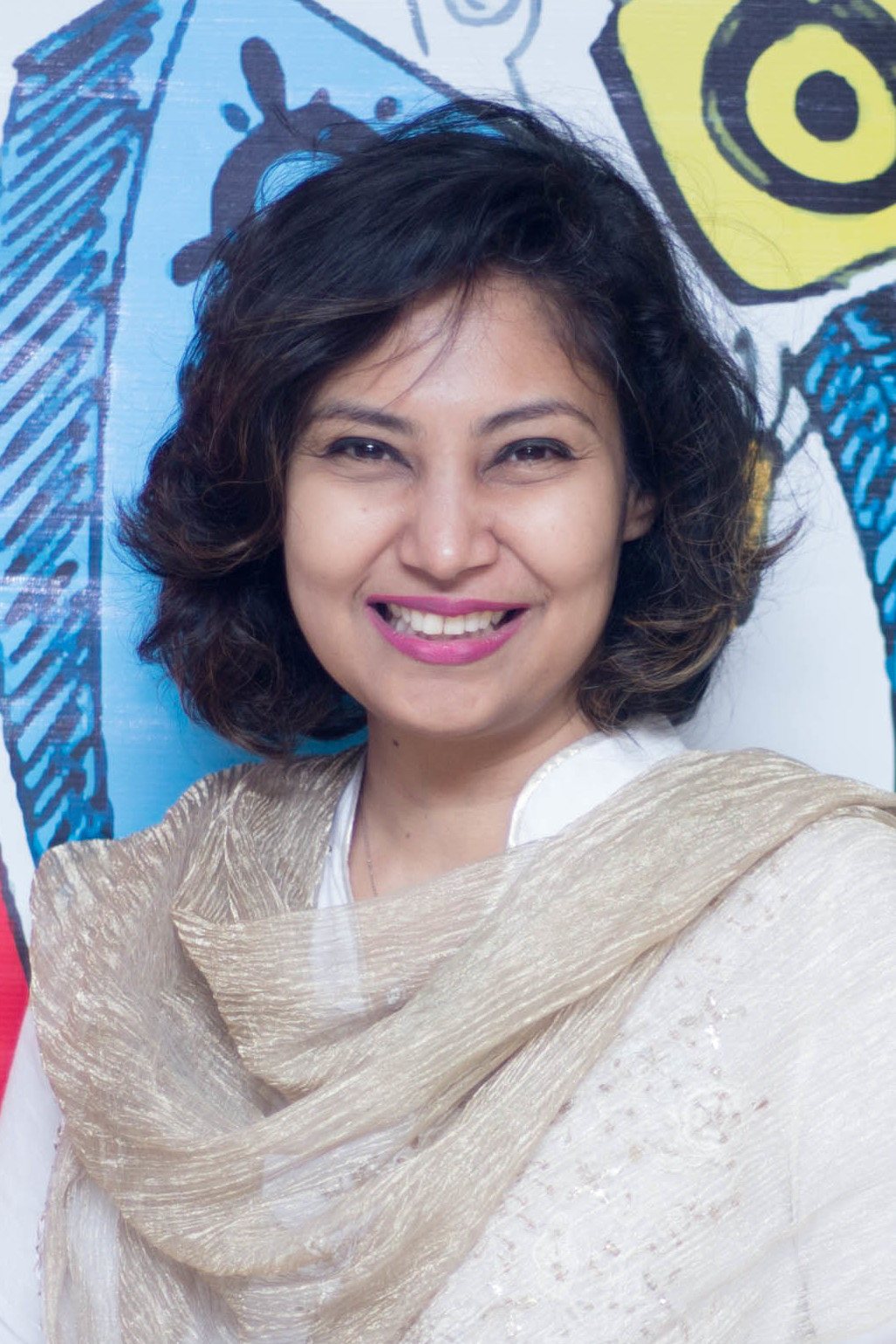
- Mahmud in 2019

Background information
- Origin: Bangladesh
- Genres: Pop, Folk fusion,
- Occupation: Freelance Singer
- Years active: 2000–present
- Website: mehreenofficial.com

Mehreen Mahmud, known by her stage name Mehreen, is a Bangladeshi singer.

== Biography ==
Mehreen studied in Viqarunnisa Noon School and Holy Cross College. She completed her master's degree in English literature from the University of Dhaka, after 3 years of Honours.

Mehreen's debut album, Anari, was released in 2000. She participated as a Bangladeshi Idol judge for season 1 in 2012.

In July 2023, Mehreen was awarded "Bongonari Shommanona" at the Indian Council for Cultural Relations in Kolkata. In August, she was awarded with "Attojon Srity Shommanona" at the 104th-anniversary program of East Bengal FC held in Kolkata, India. It was given by Aroop Biswas, West Bengal sports minister, and Firhad Hakim, the mayor of Kolkata.

== Discography ==
As of 2024, she has released eight solo albums:

- Anari (2000)
- Dekha Hobe (2002)
- Mone Pore Tomaye (2004)
- Bhalobashar Gaan: A Romantic Compilation (2005)
- Don't Forget Me (2006)
- Tumi Acho Boley (2008)
- SE7EN (2017)
- Bondhuta (2019)
