= Fazal-e-Khuda =

Bangladeshi musician (1941–2021)

Fazl-e-Khuda
- ফজল এ খোদা
- Born: 9 March 1941; Pabna, Bengal Presidency, British India
- Died: 4 July 2021 (aged 80); Dhaka, Bangladesh

Fazl-e-Khuda (9 March 1941 — 4 July 2021) was a Bangladeshi poet, musician, songwriter, and administrator. He was awarded Ekushey Padak in 2023 posthumously for his contribution to music. His written song "Salam Salam Hajar Salam" ranked 12 in the 2006 top 20 BBC's list of the greatest Bengali songs of all time.

== Career ==
Fazl-e-Khuda started his career as a lyricist at Radio Bangladesh (now Bangladesh Betar) in 1963. He retired as a director of the organization. Fazl-e-khuda was a freedom fighter.

Fazl-e-Khuda died on 4 July 2021 due to COVID-19 infection while undergoing treatment at Shaheed Suhrawardy Medical College & Hospital in Dhaka.

The versatile icon of Bengali literature Fazl-E-Khuda was a Bangladeshi. He wrote poetry, rhymes, plays, music lyrics, and essays. He was unsurpassed as a lyricist. He was among the lyricists of Swadhin Bangla Betar Kendra in 1971. He wrote the songs "Salam Salam Hajar Salam", "Sangram Sangram Sangram", "Ami Shunechi Ekti Mayer Kanna" etc. These songs inspired the nation during the war and protested Pakistani aggression. Mr. Fazl-e-khuda has already been selected as one of the best Lyrist which was revealed by a survey conducted by BBC in Bangladesh and India.

Besides, Fazl-e-Khuda was also an organizer. He was the founder of the children's organization, 'Shapla Shaluker Asar', he was popularly known as 'Mitabhai'. He worked tirelessly to nurture the mental faculties and talents of children. He wrote poems, and nursery rhyme plays for children and edited the children's magazine 'Shapla Shaluk'. Through his writings for children, he attempted to inspire in them a sense of ethics and patriotism.

Fazl-e-Khuda started his music career as a lyricist in 1963 at the then Pakistan Radio, now Bangladesh Betar, and retired as a director. The year 1971, changed the course of the poet's life. After the March 25th crackdown by the Pakistani Military, Fazl-E-Khuda joined the second sector as a freedom fighter in the Liberation War.
