= Mumtaz Ali Khan (musician) =

Bangladeshi singer, lyricist, composer (1920-1990)

- Born: 1 August 1920; Manikganj District, Bengal Presidency, British India
- Died: 31 August 1990 (aged 70); Dhaka, Bangladesh
- Children: Pilu

Mumtaz Ali Khan (1 August 1920 – 31 August 1990) was a Bangladeshi singer, lyricist, composer, collector of songs. He was awarded Ekushey Padak in 1981 by the Government of Bangladesh.

== Early life and career ==
Khan learnt classical music from Nisar Husain. He was enlisted as an artiste at Calcutta Station of All India Radio.

== Personal life ==
Khan had 6 daughters. Including Pilu Momtaz, they all became musicians. He had a granddaughter named Homayra Zaman Mou.
