= Abdul Jabbar (singer) =

Bangladeshi singer (1938–2017)

Abdul Jabbar আব্দুল জব্বার
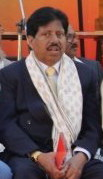

Background information
- Born: 10 February 1938; Kushtia, Bengal Presidency, British India
- Died: 30 August 2017 (aged 79) Dhaka, Bangladesh
- Genres: Playback singing
- Occupation: Singer
- Years active: 1971–2017

Mohammad Abdul Jabbar (10 February 1938 – 30 August 2017) was a Bangladeshi singer. He is most widely known for his song "Ore Nil Doriya".

Also "Tumi Ki Dekhechho Kobhu Jiboner Porajoy", "Salam Salam Hajar Salam" and "Joy Bangla, Banglar Joy" were three of his songs which made it to the top 20 all-time Bangla songs in a 2006 survey by the BBC Bangla. He was awarded the Ekushey Padak in 1980 and the Independence Day Award in 1996 by the government of Bangladesh.

== Early life and career ==
Abdul Jabbar was born in Kushtia. He passed SSC in 1956. He first took music lessons from Muhammad Osman in Kushtia and later from Moksed Ali Shai, Lutfel Haque, and Shibkumar Chatterjee in Kolkata. In 1958, lyricist Azizur Rahman helped Abdul Jabbar get listed as an artiste of the radio station. He debuted his playback singing career in 1962 with music director Robin Ghosh. In 1964, he was enlisted as a TV artiste.

In 1969, Abdul Jabbar founded a musical group Bangabandhu Shilpagosthi. On 25 March 1971, he crossed the border into India and gradually joined a host of artistes of the Swadhin Bangla Betar Kendra.

After the independence of Bangladesh, he started performing as a film playback singer. In 2008, after a five-decade career of playback singing, he started working on his only album, Kothay Amar Neel Doriya, which was released in 2017. The songs of the album are written by lyricist Md Amirul Islam and composed by Md Golam Sarwar. In the same year, he opened an album with songs on Father of the Nation Bangabandhu Sheikh Mujibur Rahman. The album remains unfinished as Abdul Jabbar fell seriously ill before giving voice to the song titled "Bangabandhu Dekhechi Tomay Dekhechi Muktijuddho", penned by lyricist Amirul Islam.

Abdul Jabbar served as the president of Bangladesh Sangskritik Parishad.

== Personal life ==
Abdul Jabbar was married to Halima Jabbar. Together they had two sons and one daughter: Mithun Jabbar, Jasmin Jabbar, and Babu Jabbar.

== Awards ==
- Bangabandhu Padak (1973)
- Ekushey Padak (1980)
- Independence Day Award (1996)
- Bachsas Awards (2003)
- Citycell-Channel i Music Awards – Lifetime Achievement Award (2011)
- Zahir Raihan Chalachchitra Purashkar
- Mother Teresa Award

== Film songs ==
Year	Film	Song	Composer(s)	Songwriter(s)	Co-artist(s)
1970	Chhoddobeshi	"Khelaghor Bare Bare Keno Bhange"	Satya Saha	Syed Shamsul Haque	solo
1970	Deep Nebhe Nai	"Akash Bhenge Jodi Ase Jhor"	Satya Saha	Gazi Mazharul Anwar	solo
1970	Deep Nebhe Nai	"Prithibi Tomar Komol Matite"	Satya Saha	Gazi Mazharul Anwar	solo
1970	Deep Nebhe Nai	"Amar Dadu Lokkhi Dadu"	Satya Saha	Gazi Mazharul Anwar	solo
1970	Ghurnijhor	"Ekti Moner Ashish Tumi"	Omar Faruk	S. M. Hedayet	solo
1970	Je Agune Puri	"Nirob Prithibi Duare Tomar"	Khandaker Nurul Alam	Gazi Mazharul Anwar	solo
1970	Jibon Theke Neya	"O Amar Shopno Jhora"	Khan Ataur Rahman	Khan Ataur Rahman	Sabina Yasmin, Mahmudun Nabi, Khandaker Faruk Ahmed, Nilufar Yasmin
1970	Koto Je Minoti	"Tumi Saat Sagorer Opar Hote"	Anwar Parvez	Gazi Mazharul Anwar	Shahnaz Rahmatullah
1970	Koto Je Minoti	"Ei Tanpurar Taar Gulo Aaj"	Anwar Parvez	Gazi Mazharul Anwar	solo
1970	Peech Dhala Poth	"Rode Pure Peech Gole"	Robin Ghosh	Mohammad Moniruzzaman	solo
1970	Peech Dhala Poth	"Peech Dhala Ei Pothtare"	Robin Ghosh	Ahmed Zaman Chowdhury	solo
1973	Jibon Trishna	"Ei Andhar Kokhono Jabena Muchhe"	Khandaker Nurul Alam	Kazi Aziz	Nilufar Yasmin
1974	Beiman	"Ami Bondhu Matal Noi"	Anwar Parvez	Gazi Mazharul Anwar	solo
1975	Sadhu Shoytan	"Mukh Dekhe Bhool Koro Na"	Sujeyo Shyam, Raja Hossain Khan	Gazi Mazharul Anwar	solo
1976	Surjogrohon	"Nil Nil Nilanto Akasher Niche"	Raja Shyam	Gazi Mazharul Anwar	Sabina Yasmin
1977	Aguner Alo	"Mon Tui Bujhli Na Re"	Alam Khan	Gazi Mazharul Anwar	solo
1977	Trishna	"Ghum Neme Aayre"	Satya Saha	Gazi Mazharul Anwar	Anjuman Ara Begum
1978	Maa	"Biday Dao Go Bondhu Tomra"	Satya Saha	Zia Haider	Sabina Yasmin
1978	Sareng Bou	"Ore Neel Doriya"	Alam Khan	Mukul Chowdhury	solo
1979	Songini	"Duti Mon Jokhon Nithur Holo"	Azad Rahman	Ahmed Zaman Chowdhury	solo
1980	Sokhi Tumi Kar	"Tumi Achho Sobi Achhe"	Alam Khan	Mukul Chowdhury	solo
1980	Sokhi Tumi Kar	"Ek Deshe Chhilo Ek Badshah"	Alam Khan	Mukul Chowdhury	Lucy Rahman

== List of selected songs ==
Song	Film	Music director	Lyricist	Year	Co-singers	Notes/Sang for
A Bhubone Ke Apon Por	Apon Por	Khan Ata	Khan Ata	1970		
A Maalik E Jahan Ami Boro	Datha Hatim Tai			1977		
Amar Se Prem Amake Firiye	Binimoy					
Amar Ei Chokh Duto Ayna						
Ami Bashanto Hoye Eshe						
Ami Ek Neer Hara Jhorer	Jhorer Pakhi	Khan Ata	Khan Ata			Razzak
Ami Nirobe Jolite Chaai						
Ami Prodiper Motho Raat						
Amito Bondhu Matal Noi	Beiman	Anwar Parvez	Gazi mazharul Anwar	1974		Razzak
Bhalobasha Jadi Jontrona						
Biday Daugo Bondhu tumra	Maa			1977		
Du Jahaner Malik Tumi	Joy Porajoy	Satya Shaha	Gazi Mazharul Anwar			
Dukkho Korona Bondhu	Alor Michil	Satya Shaha	Mustafizur Rahman	1974		
Duti Mon Jokhon Kachhe						
Ei Adhaar Kokhono jabena	Jiban Trishna				Nilufar Yasmin	
Ek Buk Jala Niye Bodhu	Mastaan					
Emonto Kotha Chhilona						
Fuler Arale Chhilo Bish						
Jani Kobitar Cheye Tumi	Megher Pore Megh					
Jibono Adhare Peyechhi					Sabina Yasmin	
Ke Jeno Amay Dake Priyo	Odhikar	Ali Hussain				
Khela Ghar Baare Baare						
Ki Gaan Shunabo Ogo						
Ki Sukh Pao Tumi Amake	Slogan					
Mon Tui Dekhlinare	Aguner Alo					
Mukh Dekhe Bhul Korona	Shadu Shoytan			1975		
Neerab Prithibi Duware	Je Agune Puri					
Neerobota Shudhu Dheke						
Nitur Prithibi Diyechho						
O Moner Moyna Ayna Kachhe						
Ogo Kajal Kalo Megh						
Ogo Tonni Tonulata Bonni						
Oi Chand Dur Theke Joto						
Omon Kore Jeonako tumi	Imaan				Runa Laila	
Onek Bochor Paar Hoye						
Ore Neel Doriya Amay De Re De Chhariya	Sareng Bou		Mukul Chowdhury			Faruk
Ore Pakhi Monowa Pakhi	Ghar Jamai					
Path Chirodin Shathi Hoye						
Pakhi Chhatpataiya More						
Pich Dhala Ei Pathtare	Pich Dhala Path					
Prem Tui Dena Amay Ektu						
Prithibi Tumar Kumal mati	Deep Nebhe Nai	Satya Shaha	Moniruzzaman	1970		
Salam Salam Hazar Salam						
Sathi Amar Holona tho Keu						
Shatru Tumi Bhondhu tumi	Anuraag	Shubol Das		1979		
Shimahin Shagore Vashiye						
Shohor Bashi Shuno Tumra						
Shopno Bhora Noyon Amar						
Shuchorita Jeonako Kichu	Deuer Por Deu	Raja Hussain Khan	G M Anwar			Razzak
Shudhu Gaan Geye porichoy	Obuz Mon	Shamsul Haque	Gazi Mazharul Anwar	1972		Razzak
Shurer Bhubone Ami Ajo						
Tara Bhora Raate Tomar			Poet Azizur Rahman			
Tumar Bhubone Eto Oshohay	Manusher Mon			1972		Anwar Hossain
Tumader Jolsa Ghore Ami						
Tumar Se Prem Tusharer						
Tumi Achho Shobi Achhe						
Tumi Ki Dekhecho Kobhu	Eto Tuku Asha	Satya Shaha	Mohammad Moniruzzaman	1968		
Tumi Saat Sagore Opar	Koto Je Minoti				Shahnaz Rahmatulla	

== Musical albums ==
Name	Lyricist	Music director	Genre	Year of recording	Year of release	Notes/Sang for
Kothay Amar Neel Doriya	Md Amirul Islam	Md Golam Sarwar	Classic Album	2008-2009	2017	

== Death ==
Abdul Jabbar was admitted to Bangabandhu Sheikh Mujib Medical University (BSMMU) on 1 August 2017 with kidney, cardiovascular, prostate, and other ailments. He was shifted to the intensive care unit (ICU) as his health condition deteriorated. He died on 30 August 2017 at the ICU of the hospital while undergoing treatment.
