= Ajit Roy =

Bangladeshi singer (1938–2011)

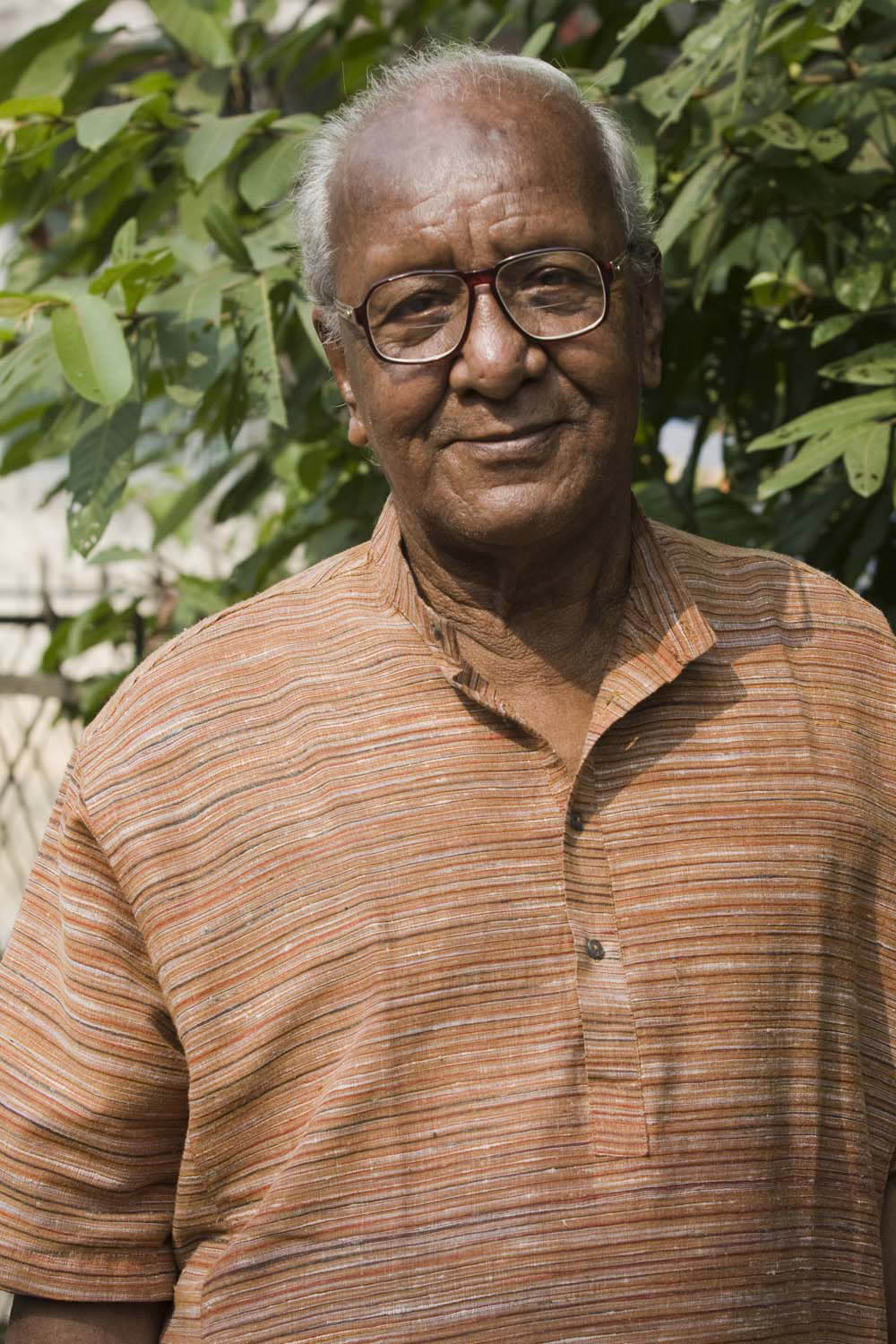
- Roy in 2010

Background information
- Born: 29 June 1938; Ulipur, Kurigram, Bengal Presidency, British India
- Died: 4 September 2011 (aged 73) Dhaka, Bangladesh
- Genre: Rabindra Sangeet

Ajit Roy (29 June 1938 – 4 September 2011) was a Bangladeshi Rabindra Sangeet singer. During the Liberation War of 1971 he sang inspiring songs called Gana Sangeet to inspire people to take arms against the Pakistani forces. He was awarded the Independence Day Award in 2000 by the Government of Bangladesh.

== Early life ==
Roy was born in the village of Ulipur in Kurigram district on June 29, 1938. His father Mukunda Chandra Roy was a government official in Rangpur while his mother Konika Roy was a school teacher and cultural activist. He took lesson on Tagore's music from his mother Konika Roy in his childhood.

== Career ==
=== In radio and television ===
Roy came to Dhaka in the 1960s and began working with the country's government-run radio station and also worked with the country's only television channel from its inception. He gained in popularity in composing many patriotic songs during the war.

In the mid-60s Roy used to compose a new song on the occasion of the Language Movement Day every year and present that particular song on the auspicious day. It was Roy who sang Bidrohi by Rebel Poet Kazi Nazrul Islam, composed by Altaf Mahmud on one such occasion. In 1972 he joined Bangladesh Betar (radio) as a music director, and retired in 1996. He was also the founder of a musical organisation, Abbhudoy Sangeet Academy.

=== War and playbacks ===
He lent his voice to several feature films including ‘Jibon Thekey Neya’, 'Reporter', 'Je Agune Purechhi', 'Janmabhumi', 'Kothai Jeno Dekhechhi' and 'Kasai. He also played a character in the film 'Suruj Mia'. Ajit rendered “Amar Sonar Bangla” and “Jago Onashono Bondi” and composed many timeless songs on SBBK. He composed the first song announcing the victory of Bangladesh: “Shwadhin Shwadhin Dikey Dikey Aj”.

== Death ==
Roy had long been suffering from cancer as well as pneumonia. He died on September 4, 2011.

=== Awards ===
- Independence Day Award (2000)
- Gunijan Padak from Rabindra Sangeet Sammilon Parishad
- Sraddhanjalipatro from Bangladesh Rabindra Sangeet Shilpi Shangshtha
- Shabdoshainik Padak from SBBK
- Sequence Award (1988)
- Begum Rokeya Padak
- Chittagong Youth Choir Award
- Wrishijo Shilpo Goshthi Padak
- Robi Rashmi Padak
