= Ashiquzzaman Tulu =

Bangladeshi singer (born March 6, 1966)

Ashiquzzaman Tulu আশিকুজ্জামান টুলু
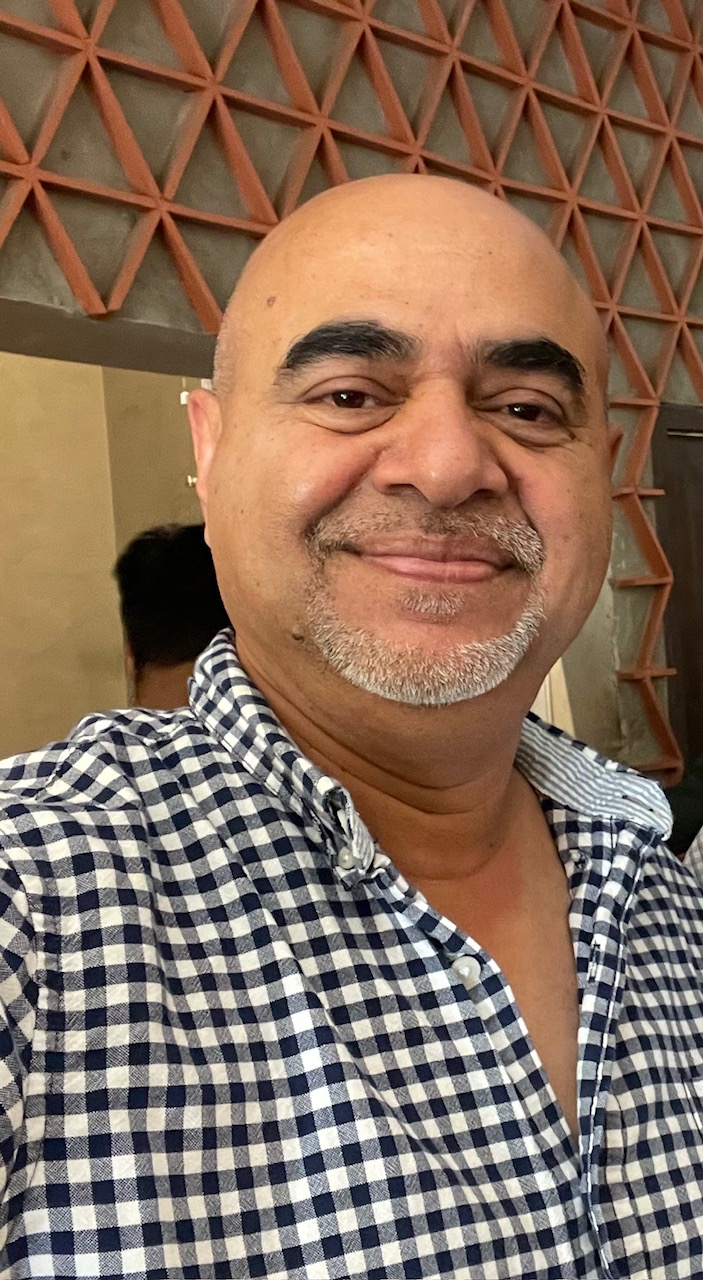
- Ashiquzzaman Tulu in 2024

Background information
- Born: March 6, 1966 (age 60); Dhaka, Bangladesh
- Genres: Rock, Pop
- Occupations: Singer, songwriter, music composer, music director, author, lyricist, businessman
- Instruments: Keyboards; Bass; Guitar; Tabla
- Years active: 1980–present
- Labels: Soundtek; Ektaar Music; SARGAM; Polyphonic

Ashiquzzaman Tulu (born March 6, 1966) is a Bangladeshi singer, songwriter, musician, composer, lyricist, sound engineer and music director, who was the founder and leader of the popular Bangladeshi rock bands ARK and Chime. He is recognized as a pioneering figure in the music scene of Bangladesh during the 1980s and 1990s.

He was born in 1966 in Dhaka and comes from a musical family. After his father's death in 1973, Tulu began learning instruments like tabla and bongo. He earned degrees in sociology and computer science.

In the 1980s, Tulu composed Bangladesh's second ever audio cassette. In 1982/1983, he founded the rock band Chime, serving as their composer and touring with them extensively before he left the band in 1987 after the success of their debut album that came out the same year. Tulu left Chime in 1990, and in the 1990, Tulu formed the rock band ARK. He was the band's leader, composer, keyboardist, vocalist.

Tulu is recognized for introducing the mixed album format to Bangladesh, curating projects featuring multiple artists. This includes the 1993 album "STARS." Over his career, Tulu composed and produced albums for many notable Bangladeshi singers and bands across different genres.

== Early life and family ==
Ashiquzzaman Tulu was born March 6, 1966, in Dhaka, Bangladesh. He is the son of Ustad Munshi Raisuddin, a prominent Bangladeshi musician and musicologist.

During the liberation war of 1971, his family took shelter to a village in Magura as Tulu's father was in the hit list of the Pakistani Army.

After the death of his father in 1973, Tulu's elder brother, AFM Alimuzzaman guided him to learn various musical instruments like tabla, dholak, and dotara and also received early training in Hindustani classical music. From 1978, he started playing guitar.

== Education ==
Tulu finished his Higher Secondary from Udayan School. He did his Honors in Sociology in 1986 and Masters in Sociology in 1990 from the University of Dhaka. Later, he finished his BSc in computer science in 2000 from Brock University, Canada.

== Career ==
=== Solo ===
In 1980, Tulu composed the 2nd audio album in the history of Audio Cassette industry of Bangladesh. The album was titled "Golden hits of Zulfikar". In 1982, he arranged music of Azam Khan's first audio cassette album, Alal Dulal. In 1983, he started playing bass as a session player in Bangladesh movies. From 1986 to 1990, he was a bassist in popular Bengali singer Sabina Yasmin's band.

From 1990, Tulu began music direction for television plays, and produced title music and scores for various TV dramas. In 1991, Tulu started his own sound company Polyphonic in Bangladesh. In 1993, he was elected as the 2nd General Secretary of the BAMBA (Bangladesh Musical Band Association). From 1995 to 1998 Tulu composed several record albums of contemporary artists such as Syed Abdul Hadi, Ishtiak, Shakila Zafar, Tapan Chowdhury, Fakir Alamgir, Firoj Shai, Samina Chowdhury, Shubir Nandi, Kumar Bishwajit, Maksud, Partho, among others.

A young guitarist from your country is playing with my music on my US-Canada tour. The boy is very bright.

("তোমাদের দেশে একজন তরুণ গিটারিস্ট আমার আমেরিকা-কানাডা সফরে আমার গানের সঙ্গে বাজাচ্ছে। ছেলেটা বেশ ব্রাইট।")

— Manna Dey on Ashiquzzaman Tulu

In 2001, Tulu released his first solo album, titled "Kon Kheyale". It was released from Soundtek. The album consisted of 12 tracks voiced by him. Tracks were written by Niaz Ahmed Aungshu, Hasan, Ripon Sikdar, Bappy Khan, among others.

In 2002, Tulu started working as an in-house music director at Ektaar Music. In 2006, he contributed to Bangladeshi musician Autumnal Moon's album Paper, as a bassist and keyboardist, released from Ektaar.

In 2005, Tulu arranged music for the first studio album of Hyder Husyn, titled Phaishya Gechhi.

From 2016 to 2020, Tulu worked as a music producer with multiple Bangladeshi Audio Video production companies. He composed several popular tracks including "Tumi Amar Prothom Shokal", "Ei Dur Probashe", "Kono Ek Shundori Rate", and "Resmi Jochonay".

==== STARS ====
In 1993, Tulu composed a mix album featuring 14 popular contemporary musical artists, titled STARS. It was released under the banner of Soundtek, and sponsored by Coca-Cola. It featured famous artists such as Azam Khan, Maqsoodul Haque of Feedback, Naquib Khan of Renaissance, Samina Chowdhury, among others. It was Bangladesh's first mixed album. The album contained tracks such as "Kono Ek Shundori Rate", and "Heshe Khele" by Samina Chowdhury and Maqsoodul Haque, which garnered recognition.

In 1994, Tulu composed the sequel album to STARS titled "STARS 2". It featured artists such as Ayub Bachchu, Agun, Maqsoodul Haque, among others.

==== Shudhu Tomar Jonno ====
In 1993, Tulu composed a duet mixed album titled "Shudhu Tomar Jonno". Released by Soundtek, and sponsored by Coca-Cola, it featured 12 romantic duet tracks, featuring overall 19 contemporary popular artists, including Tapan Chowdhury, Shakila Zafar, Khalid Hassan Milu, Sumona Haque, among others. Tulu recorded and composed the album in Orbit studio in Dhaka, spanning over 2 months. It was the first mixed album in Bangladesh that featured multiple duet tracks. The album contained the popular track "Tumi Amar Prothom Shokal."

=== Freezing Point ===
After finishing his high school, Tulu joined an amateur band named Freezing Point in 1980, at the invitation of his close friend Shuvro. He was the son of Tulu's Bengali teacher at Udayan School. He learned guitar play-up skills with the help of Shuvro. Tulu toured sporadically with the band before it broke up in 1982, after Shuvro left for London.

=== Chime ===
Chime
- Origin: Dhaka, Bangladesh
- Genres: Pop, rock
- Years active: 1985–present
- Labels: SARGAM, Shongita
- Members: Khalid; Bahadur; Biplob; Riaz; Nadim; Ashique Mostafa
- Past members: Ashiquzzaman Tulu; Shouquat Ali Imon; Sumon; Babu; Al-Amin; Shamim

In late 1982 / early 1983 Tulu formed the pop band Chime along with his friends. In 1984, Tulu began touring with Chime in numerous concerts throughout the country. Their debut concert was staged at T.S.C. in early 1984. In 1986, he composed the first album of the band titled "Chachir Dhukkho", which was released in January 1987. It was released under the banner of recording label SARGAM. A song from the album titled "Nati Khati Bela Gelo" became a national hit.

Over the years, Tulu toured with Chime in hundreds of shows in Bangladesh, including Flood Aid, Band Aid, and Bapri Aia. They also toured in foreign countries, namely in Qatar in 1989. He left the band in 1990.

=== ARK ===
After leaving Chime, Tulu formed Ark in 1991. He was the band leader, composer, keyboardist and Vocalist. The band's first line-up consisted of keyboardist and vocalist Ashiquzzaman Tulu, Shamim, Farid, Jahangir, Mobin, and Partha. Later on, Pancham, Shishir, Rezwan, and Hasan joined the band, which was ARK's 2nd line-up.

==== মুক্তিযুদ্ধ (Liberation War) ====
Ark released their first studio album, "মুক্তিযুদ্ধ (Liberation War)", under the banner of recording label SARGAM in 1991. This album featured the songs "সেদিনো আকাশে (That Day in the Sky)" and "হারিকেন লণ্ঠন (Hurricane Lantern)".

==== তাজমহল (Tajmahal) ====
In 1996, Ark released their second studio album, "তাজমহল (Tajmahal)" via Soundtek. The album was an instant success, and it contributed the band's growth in the upcoming years. The album featured songs such as "সুইটি" (Sweetie), "একাকী " (Ekaki), "তাজমহল" (Tajmahal), "গুরু" (Guru), "পাগল মন" (Pagol Mon), "এমন একটা সময় ছিল" (Emon Ekta Shomoy Chilo), "আমার হৃদয়ে তুমি" (Amar Hridoye Tumi).

==== জন্মভূমি (Birthplace) ====
In 1998, Ark released their third studio album, "জন্মভূমি (Birthplace)" on Soundtek. It became an instant hit leading to the band's growing popularity. The album featured the songs "যারে যা (Go Away)", "এই দূর প্রবাসে (In This Far Foreign Land)", "কিছু কিছু কথা" (Kichu Kichu Kotha), and "Bangladesh."

==== স্বাধীনতা (Freedom) ====
After his brief stay in Canada with family, he returned to Bangladesh in July 2000 and crafted ARK's fourth studio album "স্বাধীনতা (Freedom)." It was released by Soundtek, and continued to the success of the previous albums. It featured songs such as "প্রেমা (Love)", "আর কতো মিথ্যে ? (How Many More Lies?)", and "বন্ধু (Friend)."

==== হারান মাঝি (Haran Majhi) ====
In 2001, Hasan and Pancham left the band, at that time, Tulu was living in Canada. In 2002, he reformed the band with musician Autumnal Moon, and released the band's 5th album "হারান মাঝি "(Haran Majhi) in 2003, Tulu being the keyboardist. The album was a composition of 12 of western-eastern fusion-music tracks.

== Personal life ==
Tulu currently resides in Toronto, Canada with his 2nd wife Nawshin Kibria, daughter Rodia, and son Nawar. His daughter Rodia is a musician known for her renditions of classic Bengali songs, including from her father's bands. From 1990 to 2004, he was an assistant director of Personnel Administration in the Rural Electrification Board (REB) under the Ministry of Energy and Mineral Resources. From 2000 to 2002, he worked as a software developer at Tri Media, a software development company in Thorold.

== Works ==
=== Discography ===
==== Albums ====
Year	Album	Artist	Category
1985	Chime	Chime	Band Album
1991	Mukti Juddho	ARK	Band Album
1996	Tazmohol	ARK	Band Album
1998	Jonmobhumi	ARK	Band Album
2000	Shadhinota	ARK	Band Album
2003	Haran Majhi	ARK	Band Album
2001	Kon Kheyaley	Ashiquzzaman Tulu	Solo Album
2006	Dwimatreek	Jatra	Band Album
1991	Copier	A T featuring Hasan, Bappi, Saif, Pancham, Shishir, Shamim	Mixed Album
1992	Copier 2	A T featuring Syed Hasanur Rahman, Ashiquzzaman Tulu, Shishir, Shamim, Ridwan Nabi Pancham	Mixed Album
1993	Super Copier	A T featuring Shamim, Bappi, Syed Hasanur Rahman, Shishir, S.I. Tutul, Ridwan Nabi Pancham	Mixed Album
1994	Cocktail	A T featuring Various Artist	Mixed Album
1995	Unmad	A T featuring Various Artist	Mixed Album
1993	Star's	A T featuring Various Artist	Mixed Album
1993	Shudhu Tomar Jonno	A T featuring Various Artist	Mixed Album
1994	Eki Brintey	A T featuring Various Artist	Mixed Album
1995	Aamader Bhalobasha	A T featuring Various Artist	Mixed Album
1996	Star's #2	A T featuring Various Artist	Mixed Album
1997	Ektu Chowa	A T featuring Various Artist	Mixed Album
1998	Ananda Dhara	A T featuring Various Artist	Mixed Album
2000	Dukheeni Maa	A T featuring Various Artist	Mixed Album
1980	Golden Hits Of Zulfiquar & Prema	A T featuring Zulfiquar & Prema	Solo Album
1985	Alal Dulal	A T featuring Azam Khan	Solo Album
1990	Bappy Khan	A T featuring Bappy Khan	Solo Album
1991	Hridoye Gunjon	A T featuring Banna	Solo Album
1992	Grohantori Bhalobasha	A T featuring Reshad Mahmood	Solo Album
1993	Tumi Shudhu Amari	A T featuring Shakil Khan	Solo Album
1994	Hridoyer Kotha	A T featuring Saif Islam	Solo Album
1995	Bibagi Raat	A T featuring Niloy Das	Solo Album
1996	Je Ovimaney	A T featuring Samina Chowdhury	Solo Stamina
1998	Elomelo	A T featuring Nafis Kamal	Solo Album
2001	Tui	A T featuring Roktim	Solo Album
2002	Ochena Pothik	A T featuring Pothik Nobi	Solo Album
2005	Faisa Gechhi	A T featuring Hyder Husyn	Solo Album
2006	Paper	A T featuring Autumnal Moon	Solo Album

=== Other works ===
- Tulur Golpo, autobiography book, 2020

== Awards ==
- 2022- Sher E Bangla Fazlul Haque Peace Award
