= Shahid Mahmud Jangi =

Bangladeshi lyricist and author

- শহীদ মাহমুদ জঙ্গী
- Born: Shahiuddin Mahmud Jangi Chowdhury; 6 February 1956 (age 70); Chittagong, Bangladesh
- Education: Masters in Management
- Alma mater: University of Chittagong, Bangladesh
- Occupations: Lyricist, author
- Years active: 1977–present

Shahiuddin Mahmud Jangi Chowdhury (born 6 February 1956) is a Bangladeshi lyricist and author.

== Early life and education ==
Jangi was born in Chittagong to father L.A Chowdhury and mother Hamida Chowdhury. He graduated from the University of Chittagong with a bachelor's degree in management (Honors) and a Master of Management. He was very active in school, organizing and playing the lead role in plays and participating in school radio programs.

== Career ==
After earning a master's degree in management, Jangi joined as a lecturer at Omergani M E S College Chittagong. He started his own business with an advertising firm and simultaneously started another business in the service industry.

=== Author ===
Jangi used to write articles and lyrics from an early age and released his first song “Alo chayte” composed by Naquib Khan in 1978, telecast on Bangladesh Television (BTV). Jangi has published numerous articles in national and local newspapers.

=== Lyricist ===
Jangi started writing songs in 1977. He has carved a niche for himself in the field of songwriting with a number of hit songs for many pioneering Bangladeshi bands and soloists. Jangi shared his thoughts on the state of music in Bangladesh.

Over the years, Jangi has gained success in songwriting, emerging as a legendary lyricist of Bangladesh. Besides traditional and colloquial songs, he has written many patriotic anthems in the pop and rock genres. The topics of his songs comprise love, hardships, as well as songs about growing up in Bangladesh. Music enthusiasts have called him a lyricist with a different style. Many renowned singers and composers have acknowledged and accredited him for his contributions to their careers. He was the two time president of Lyricists Association of Bangladesh and founding vice-president of Music Alliance Bangladesh.

There are many articles published about him in several newspapers and online portals.

== Works ==
=== Songs ===
Song	Performer(s)
Hridoy Kadamati	Renaissance
Ghum Bhanga Shohore	Love Runs Blind
Aj Je Shishu	Renaissance
Shomoy Jeno Katena	Samina Chowdhury
Dokhina Hawa	Partha Barua
Chayer Cupe	Souls
Ki Jane Ki Ek Din Chilo	Love Runs Blind
Jotin Sirer Classe	Naseem Ali Khan
Aro Deshot Jaiyo Tui	Renaissance
Aiyo Na	Souls
Hridoyer Nil Jodi	Pilu Khan and Samina Chowdhury
Bhalobashi Oi Shobuj	Souls
Ek Chokhe Shudhu Shopno	Souls
Nonaiya Nonaiya	Renaissance
Shei Kobe	Partha Barua
Protidin Protiti	Souls
Mukto Manik	Souls
Tritio Bishsho	Renaissance
Anobhik Aghate	Souls
Hey Bangladesh	Renaissance
E Jeno Tomar Amar	Renaissance
Bidhire	Souls
Ei Bujhi Tumi Ele	Samina Chowdhury
Tumi Ami Noy Aj	Souls
Tumi Nei Projapoti Nei	Zafar Iqbal
Eito Ekhane Brishti	Souls
Prem Premer Moto	Ayub Bachchu
Hajar Bochor Por	Shakil Khan
Khola Chithi	Shams Sumon
Eito Besh Achi	Tapan Chowdhury and Sharalipi
Ami Jantam	Shakil Khan
Ek Pa Egulei Bhalobasha	Naquib Khan
Eri Majhe	Souls
Kolahol	Naseem Ali Khan
Mon Bhenge Jay	Naseem Ali Khan
Bhabona	Naseem Ali Khan
Ohe Nodi	Naseem Ali Khan
Tumi To Pote Aka Choto Nou	Naquib Khan
Bhule Gecho Tumi Keno Shei Bhule	Unknown
