= Prince Mahmud =

Bangladeshi composer & lyricist

- প্রিন্স মাহমুদ
- Born: 17 July; Khulna, Bangladesh
- Occupations: Composer; lyricist; music director

Prince Mahmud (born 17 July) is a Bangladeshi lyricist, composer, and music director. Since the 1990s, he has been writing and composing songs for solo and mixed albums by Bangladeshi band artists. Many of his works became widely popular. His first mixed album, Shakti (1995), marked his debut as a composer of mixed albums and achieved immediate success. Over a career spanning more than three decades, Mahmud has released 50 albums, including solo, duet, and mixed works. He is often regarded as one of the most prominent lyricists and composers of his time.

Mahmud began his career as a lead vocalist, later establishing himself as a composer and lyricist. He produced mixed albums with leading band artists of Bangladesh, many of which achieved notable commercial success. He is widely remembered for his collaborations with prominent singers such as James, Ayub Bachchu, Syed Hasanur Rahman, Khalid, Shafin Ahmed, Fahmida Nabi, Nazmun Munira Nancy, Tahsan Rahman Khan, among others. Some of his most popular songs include "আজ জন্মদিন তোমার" ("Today Is Your Birthday") with Shafin Ahmed; "হিমালয়" ("Himaloy") and "হয়নি যাবার বেলা" ("Not Time to Go") with Khalid; "বাংলাদেশ" ("Bangladesh"), "মা (Mother)", "গুরু" ("Master") and "বাবা" ("Father") with James; and "এতো কষ্ট কেন ভালোবাসায়" ("Why So Much Trouble in Love") with Syed Hasanur Rahman.

== Early life ==
Prince Mahmud was born on 17 July in Khulna District.

== Career ==
=== Early career: The Blues and From West ===
Mahmud started band music while still a school student. He was the vocalist and guitarist of a band called The Blues in the 1980s. He began writing and composing songs spontaneously. In the early 1990s, Mahmud formed a band named From West, where he was the lead vocalist. The band released Se Kemon Meye? and the song "Razakar Albadar Kichui Raibo Nare", which received positive critical response. The group later released a second and final album, Abeg, with contributions from Obscure and Different Touch. Although Mahmud began as a lead vocalist, he subsequently focused on composing and writing lyrics. Speaking to The Business Standard, he explained his decision to quit singing: "I didn't think my voice was suitable for singing at that time, so I stopped being a lead singer. I prefer not being a singer anymore."

=== Solo career: mixed album success ===
Mahmud later turned to producing mixed albums. In 1992, he released his first solo album, Jontrona, in collaboration with Ayub Bachchu and James, under the label Sangeeta. The album cover was designed and illustrated by his childhood friend Kiriti Ranjan Biswas. His second solo album, Rockstars, featured 10 tracks written and composed entirely by him.

In 1995, he released his first mixed album, Shakti, which established his reputation as a composer of mixed albums and received both commercial success and critical acclaim. Following Shakti, he released Ora Egaro Jon and Joy Porajoy.

After Joy Porajoy, Mahmud released Khoma in 1996 under the label Soundtek. The album featured Maqsoodul Haque performing a song written and composed by Mahmud for the first time. The album received widespread public response and is often cited as one of the most notable mixed albums of the 1990s.

He later released his fourth mixed album, Ghrina ("Hatred"), followed by Bebodhan.

In 1999, he released the mixed album Ekhono Du'Chokhe Bonna, which included the song "Maa" ("Mother"). The song became one of the most popular Bangladeshi songs on the theme of motherhood. In 2000, he composed "Aaj Apan Kal Por" for the album Shrut, marking singer Mizan’s debut. He collaborated again with Maqsoodul Haque in 2001 on the track "Joto Paro Tumi", following their earlier success with "Mon Niye Jontrona" from Khoma.

In October 2020, Mahmud released the single "Alo", featuring Tanzir Tuhin, under the label G-Series. The track was later featured in the 2023 drama Love You Baba, starring Niloy Alamgir. He again collaborated with Tuhin in 2021 on "Anagoto", penned by Samuel Haque and released as a music video under G-Series. In 2022, he released another song on the theme of motherhood, sung by Imran Mahmudul, and reunited with Maqsoodul Haque after 21 years for the single "Shate Pache". In 2023, he collaborated again with Mizan after 22 years on the single "Emon Hoyni Age".

=== Comeback: re-establishing stardom ===
In 2023, Mahmud returned to film composition after almost eight years with the song "Eshwar" for Himel Ashraf's Priyotoma, starring Shakib Khan. The lyrics were written by Shomeshwar Oli. For this work, Mahmud received the Babisas Award for Best Music Director.

== Impact and recognition ==
Prominent lyricist and journalist Zulfiqer Russell referred to Mahmud as the "Prince of Bengali song". In an interview with Prothom Alo, he stated, "He is indeed the prince of modern Bangla songs. His fan base includes not only the younger generation but also people of all ages."

== Discography ==
=== Notable songs ===
- "Aj Jonmodin Tomar" (sung by Shafin Ahmed)
- "Aj Kobita Onno Karou" (sung by Ayub Bachchu)
- "Aj Theke Ar Bolbona" (sung by Ayub Bachchu)
- "Baba" (sung by James)
- "Bangladesh" (sung by James)
- "Baro Mash" (sung by Ayub Bachchu)
- "Bela Shesh Fire Eshe Paini Tomay" (sung by Ayub Bachchu)
- "Bhalobashena" (sung by Rumi)
- "Bondhu Bhenge Fel Ei Karagar" (sung by James)
- "Bondhu Toke Miss Korchi" (sung by Partha Barua)
- "Duniya Tor Shongete Nai" (sung by Rumi)
- "Ek Nodi Jomuna" (sung by James)
- "Eka Eka Ki Thaka Jay" (sung by Ayub Bachchu)
- "Eto Koshto Keno Bhalobashay" (sung by Syed Hasanur Rahman)
- "Jodi Himaloy Hoye" (sung by Khalid)
- "Kichu Bhul Kichu Tomar Kichu Amar" (sung by James)
- "Ma" (sung by James)
- "Mati Hobe Mati" (sung by Rumi)
- "Mrithukabbo" (sung by Ayub Bachchu)
- "Palate Chai" (sung by Ayub Bachchu)
- "Shunil Boruna" (sung by Mahadi)

=== Band mix albums ===
- Jontrona
- Shakti (1995)
- Khoma (1996)
- Ekhono Du Chokhe Bonna (1999)
- Harjit (2000)
- Shrot (2000)
- Mehedi Ranga Haat (2001–02)
- Sesh Dekha
- Deyal Dui Hridoyer Majhe
- Chuti
- Dohon Shudhu Tomar Jonno
- Baro Mash
- Devi
- Daag Theke Jai
- Nirbachita
- Oporajeeta
- Dese Valobasa Nai
- Nimontron

=== Solo and collaborative albums ===
- Taal (solo for Hasan)
- Bondona (solo for Mahadi)
- Boka (mix of Close Up-1 artists)
- Ghumao (solo for Khalid)
- Piano (duet by James and Ayub Bachchu)
- Brihospoti
- Ghrina
- Valobasa Mane Dukkho (for Hasan)
- Hello Kosto (for Hasan)
- Kheyalpoka (2016)
- Ora Egaro Jon

== Awards ==
- Citycell-Channel i Music Awards
- BMJA Music Awards (2019)
- Channel i Music Awards (2024)
