= Nafis Kamal =

Bangladeshi singer, songwriter

Nafis Kamal নাফিস কামাল
- Genres: Rock; Melodic Pop; Latin; R&B
- Occupations: Singer; songwriter
- Instrument: Vocals
- Years active: 1998–present
- Labels: Sangeeta Music; Gaanchill Music; Soundtek

Nafis Kamal (Bengali: নাফিস কামাল) is a Bangladeshi singer and songwriter who began his career in Bangla music in the late 1990s. One of his early songs, "Ei Deshe Ek Shohor Chhilo - Elomelo," was broadcast in 1998 on the Bangladeshi television program Ityadi. His second album, Anubhobe Eka, was released in 2000. Following the release of these two albums, he took a break from music for some time. He later returned and released several singles, including Tumi Robe Nirobe (Rabindra Sangeet), Hrini Shomudro, Vetor Theke, Tumi Jokhon Ele, Shorone Ritwik, and Ekhono Shei Pothe.

== Career ==
Nafis Kamal was introduced to music at a young age. During his childhood, he attended Kendriyo Kochi Kachar Mela, where he began practicing vocal exercises. He later received formal training in both classical and contemporary music at the Nazrul Academy. Alongside his classical studies, he actively practiced and performed modern musical styles.

His debut album, "Elomelo", was released in 1998 and featured collaborations with several Bangladeshi artists. The album contained 12 tracks, including the song "Ei Deshe Ek Shohor Chhilo – Elomelo," which was broadcast on the national television program Ityadi. His second album, Anubhobe Eka, was released in 2000. Like the first, it also featured 12 tracks with contributions from various lyricists and musicians. Several songs from both albums became popular, including "Majhrater Gaan," "Nambe Ratri," "Bhalo Theko Tumi," "Bhalobashar Taka," "Aaj Ei Bishwabidyaloy," "Chirokaler Ma," "Parar Chawwala," "Jiboner Footpath," "Ekdin Ganer Jolsate," and "Du'dondo Mukhomukhi."

In 2025, Nafis Kamal lent his voice to the song "Shorone Ritwik", a tribute to filmmaker Ritwik Ghatak. The lyrics were written by the late lyricist Kausar Ahmed Chaudhury, with music composed by Syed Kollol and arranged by Tushar Rahman.

== Works ==
=== Albums ===
Year	Title	Lyricist	Composer	Reference
1998	Ei Deshe Ek Shohor Chhilo - Elomelo	Kausar Ahmed Chaudhury	Naquib Khan	
2000	Anubhobe Eka	Mohammad Rafiquzzaman, Shahid Mahmud Jangi, Liton Adhikary Rintu and Nafis	Naquib Khan, Ali Akbar Rupu	

=== Singles ===
Year	Title	Lyricist	Composer	Reference
2025	Ekhono Shei pothe	Asif Altaf	Pavel Areen	
2022	Tumi Robe Nirobe	Rabindranath Tagore	Imtiaz Ali Zimi	
2020	Bhalobashar Taka	Nirmalendu Goon	Naquib Khan, Partha Barua	
2022	Hrini Shomudro	Murtaza Khan Lodi	Tushar Rahman	
2022	Moho	Beauty Akhter Hasu and Sasha	Sasha	
2025	Shorone Ritwik	Kausar Ahmed Chaudhury	Syed Kallol	
