= List of Bangladeshi films of 1980 =

Film list released in 1980 from Bangladesh

A list of Bangladeshi films released in 1980.

== Releases ==
Title	Director	Cast	Genre	Release date	Notes	Ref.
Emiler Goenda Bahini	Badal Rahman	Partho Sahid, Tariq Anam, Sara Zaker, Golam Mustafa, Sharmili Ahmed, Momtaj Uddin Ahmed, Khoka Rahman, Benu Zaman, ATM Shamsuzzaman	Thriller Drama		Based on Erich Kästner's novel Emil and the Detectives	
Ekhoni Somoy	Abdullah Al Mamun	Abdullah Al Mamun, Bobita, Ariful Haq	Drama		Based on "senapotie" by Abdullah Al Mamun	
Sokhi Tumi Kar	Abdullah Al Mamun	Farooque, Shabana, Razzak	Romance		Shabana received best actress on National Film Awards	
Koshai	Amjad Hossain	Rozina, Alamgir, Bobita			Obtained Best music with more categories on National Film Awards	
Ghuddi	Syed Salahuddin Jaki	Raisul Islam Asad, Suborna Mustafa, Hasan Imam, Nayla Azad Nupur. Farid Ali, Tariq Anam, Happy Akhand	Romance			
Jodi Jantem	Shamsul Haque Siraji					
Jibon Nouka	Masud Parvez (Sohel Rana)	Sohel Rana, Suchorita, Dolly Chowdhury, Wahidur Rahman,				
Shesh Uttar	Azizur Rahman Bulie	Shabana, Ilias Kanchon			Azizur Rahman Bulie's debut as director	

== See also ==
- 1980 in Bangladesh
