= Dameer (singer) =

Dameer Khan
- Born: 18 September 2000 (age 25); Dhaka, Bangladesh
- Years active: 2017–present

Dameer Khan (born 18 September 2000) is a Bangladeshi singer and songwriter.

== Early life ==
Dameer was born in Dhaka in 2000, and was raised there. He is the eldest son of Bangladeshi musician Pilu Khan, a member of the band Renaissance. Dameer participated in guitar classes at a young age, and later did guitar and drum lessons at his father's music college in Baridhara. He has described how finding a travel guitar in a charity shop on a trip to England was his first instrument and his introduction to playing music.

As a teenager, Dameer moved to Malaysia, before spending several months in Ghana.

== Musical career ==
At the age of 17, Dameer signed with German record label Majestic Casual. He released his first single, Easier, in 2018. This was accompanied by a music video, released on June 20.

Dameer released his debut EP, For We Are Distant, in 2021, featuring the single "Believe". The EP received a four star review from Thomas Smith of NME, who described it as "vulnerable and open". After the release of this EP, Dameer left Majestic Casual and became an independent artist.

Dameer's first independently released single was Bashbo Bhalo in 2022, which was released alongside a music video starring his father. He has featured on radio segments for the BBC Asian Network.

=== Musical influences ===
Dameer has described his musical influences as including Bappa Mazumder, Partha Barua, Tom Misch and Skrillex.

== Discography ==
- Easier (2018)
- Sun (2019)
- Believe (2020)
- Amar Jaan (2021)
- For We Are Distant (Album) (2021)
- Bashbo Bhalo (2022)
- What Love Meant (2022)
- It'll Be Alright (2022)
- Gimme All of Your Love (2023)
- Kancha (2025)

== Personal life ==
Dameer studied economics and political science at McGill University, and lives in Toronto. He is an avid eFootball player.
