= Sajib Das =

Bangladeshi singer, composer and music director

- Genres: Pop ballad, pop fusion, blues, rock, jazz, reggae
- Occupations: Singer, Music producer, composer, guitarist

Sajib Das (Bengali: সজীব দাস) is a well-known Bangladeshi singer, composer, guitarist, and music director.

== Biography ==
Sajib Das learned music from Lucky Akhand. He played with Lucky Akhand's band Happy Touch for 12 years. He began arranging music for Akhand in the 2000s.

Sajib Das released his first original song, "Bhalobashi Tomar Oi Roddur Hashi" on the Sangeeta label in 2007 He composes songs and music for commercials along with lyrics for ad campaigns. His compositions and productions "Roddur Hasi"&"Shuhasini" were notable. His song "Valobasini" was Listed in the "CityCell Channel I" Music Awards in the Modern Song (Best Single) category.

In 2014, he composed the music of a song for Indian singer Nachiketa. He wrote the music for the 2015 songs "Amar Bangladesh", sung by Imran, Liza, Jewel Morshed, Puja, Naomi, Jhelik, and Lemis, "Eka Eka Lage", sung by Fahmida Nabi, and "Mon Tumi Chuye Gele", sung by Nirjhar.

Among the albums Sajib Das has worked on are: RJ Raju's Suhasini, Shahjahan Sohag's Amar Prithibi Choto, Ashik's Ekta Swopno. He has also composed songs for Samina Chowdhury, Rupankar Bagchi, Raghab Chatterjee, Lipi, Madhura, Sayeeda Shampa, Abanti Sithi, Sharmin Keya, Pushpita, Juthi Akhi, Sabbir, Shafiqua Mimi, Tanim Hyat khan, Walid Ahmed, Moutushi Khan, Lubna Lymi, Shoumi, Yamin Elan, Rashed, Belal Khan, Shondipon Das, Aurin, Nirjhor, Ashik, Nancy, Shoshi, Kona, among others.

== Albums ==
Some of his albums:

Album	Singer
Amar Bela je jay	Fahmida Nabi
SuHashini-1,2	Raju
Valobasini	Rana
Amar Akash Purotai	Lutfor Hasan
Shohor Jure Shoshi	Shoshi
Toke Paoar Somvabona	Rj Tutul
Pencil e aka chobi	mixed 1,2
Ajantey	Mixed
Amar Prithibi Choto	Sajahan Sohag
Mon Ghuri Ta	Ripon Chowdhury
Megh Boleche Jabo Jabo	Sajib and Friends
Mon tumi chuye gele	SR Sumon
