= Munshi Raisuddin =

Bangladeshi musician and musicologist

- মুন্সী রইসউদ্দীন
- Born: 1901
- Died: 1973 (aged 71–72)

Munshi Raisuddin (1901–1973) was a Bangladeshi musician and musicologist. He was awarded Ekushey Padak by the Government of Bangladesh in 1986.

== Early life and education ==
Raisuddin was born in Nakol village in Magura District. His father, Munshi Abbasuddin, was a classical singer. His Pseudonym is Alam piya. Anyone can be thought that its a Hindi name but he is a Bangladeshi. His bandesh is very effective in various raga. Initially, Raisuddin took music lessons from his cousin, Shamsul Haque.

== Career ==
After passing the matriculation examination, Raisuddin moved to Kolkata. At Kolkata he was a disciple of Nulo Gopal. He took lessons on dhrupad and kheyal from Rashbehari Mallick and practised music for twelve years.

Raisuddin returned to Magura and took a job at a cotton mill in Kushtia. He set up a music school. He later completed a course on classical music at the Sangeet Kala Bhavan in Kolkata, a music institution run by Girijashankar Chakraborty. Raisuddin also learnt classical music from Sharajit Kanjilal, a musician of Lucknow.

Musicians Ferdausi Rahman and Milia Ali took lessons from Raisuddin.

== Personal life ==
Munshi Raisuddin was the father of noted musician and founder of the bands Ark and Chime, Ashiquzzaman Tulu.

== Works ==
- Saral Sabgeet Sar-Sangraha
- Chhotader Sa Re Ga Ma
- Abhinaba Shataraga
- Sangeet Parichay
- Raga Lahari
- Gita Lahari

== Awards ==
- Adamjee Literary Award
- Ekushey Padak (1986)

pride of performance 1967
