= Lucky Akhand =

Bangladeshi singer-composer (1956-2017)

- লাকি আখন্দ
- Born: Aminul Haq Akhand; 18 June 1956; Dhaka, East Pakistan (now Dhaka, Bangladesh)
- Died: 21 April 2017 (aged 60); Dhaka, Bangladesh
- Other name: Lucky Anam
- Citizenship: Bangladeshi
- Occupations: Singer-songwriter; musician; composer; record producer
- Years active: 1969–2017
- Spouse: Nargis Akhtar
- Children: 1
- Father: Abdul Ali Akhand
- Relatives: Happy Akhand (brother)
- Musical career
- Genres: Pop; Adhunik (modern); Blues rock; Soft rock
- Instruments: Vocals; Keyboards; Bass guitar
- Labels: Sargam Records; G-Series
- Member of: Happy Touch

Lucky Akhand was a Bangladeshi singer-songwriter, composer, bass guitarist, keyboardist and record producer. He was associated with the musical band Happy Touch. He composed and gave voice to songs including Ei Neel Monihar, Aamay Deko Na, Agey Jodi Janitam, Riti Niti Janina, Polatok Am, Abar Elo Jey Shondhya Porichoy Kobe hobe, Aj achhi kal nei, Hotath kore Bangladesh, Tumi Daklei kachhe astam, Bolechhile kal tumi asbe, Tumi ke bolona, Amake tumi valo besona, Mamonia, and Shadhinota Tomake Niye. He served as the music director of Bangladeshi national radio network Bangladesh Betar.

== Early life ==
Aminul Haq 'Lucky' Akhand was born on 18 June 1956 in Dhaka in then East Pakistan (now Bangladesh). Akhand got music lessons at the age of five from his father. He performed in music programs for children on television and radio during 1963–1967. He was enlisted as a music composer of His Master's Voice in Pakistan when he was 14, and as a musician of His Master's Voice India at 16. He won the first prize in the 'Modern Bangla Songs' category in 1969 from the Pakistan Art Council. He was an artist of Swadhin Bangla Betar Kendra, the radio broadcasting center of the Bangladesh government formed during the Bangladesh Liberation War in 1971.

== Career ==
Akhand started his career with his self-titled solo album, Lucky Akhand, in 1984 under the banner of Sargam. Some of the notable songs of that album are "Agey Jodi Jantam", "Amay Dekona", "Mamonia", "Ei Neel Monihar" and "Hridoy Amar". He composed songs for the album of his brother, in which "Abar Elo Je Sondha" and "Ke Bashi Bajaire" sung by Happy Akhand; "Shadhinota Tomake Niye" and "Pahari Jhorna" sung by Happy Akhand and himself; and "Nil Nil Shari Pore" and "Hothat Kore Bangladesh" sung by himself are notable songs. Lucky was the music composer and also gave voice to "Abar Elo Je Sondha" (the main vocal was by Happy Akhand) and other songs in the Bangla film named Ghuddi in 1980.

Akhand stopped his career after the death of his younger brother, Happy Akhand, in 1987. He returned after a decade with two albums named Porichoy Kobe Hobe and Bitrishna Jibone Amar in 1998. Porichoy Kobe Hobe was his second solo album and the remake of his brother Happy Akhand's solo album. Bitrishna Jibone Amar was a band and modern mix album. Six singers — Tapan Chowdhury, Kumar Biswajit, Samina Chowdhury, Ayub Bachchu, James, and Hasan — sang together in this album. In the same year, he composed a duet album named Ananda Chokh with the lyrics of Golam Morshed and under the banner of Soundtrack. Akhand composed a solo album of Samina Chowdhury named Amay Dekona in 1999. He also composed the Ark song "Hridoyer Durdine Jacche Khora" for the album Dekha Hobe Bondhu. He composed another mixed album after 2000. The album was named Tomar Oronne. Bappa Mazumder, Nipu, Fahmida Nabi and himself contributed 10 songs. He used contemporary rhythm, folk fusion and his always favorite Spanish fusion in that album. Two years after Lucky Akhand's death, D-Series released a limited edition album titled "The Akhand Brothers". Which was unpublished for many years. Lucky Akhand, Happy Akhand and Shukla De have given their voices in this album. Basically this album had some remake songs and some original songs.

== Death ==
Happy Akhand passed away on 21 April, 2017 at the age of 61, after battling lung cancer. He breathed his last in his Armanitola residence in Dhaka, Bangladesh

== Discography ==
=== Solo ===
Year	Album
1984	Lucky Akhand
?	Ei Neel Monihar
1998	Porichoy Kobe Hobe

=== Duet ===
Year	Album	Co-Artist
1999	Ananda Chokh	Samina Chowdhury

=== Mixed ===
Year	Album	Co-Artist(s)
1998	Bitrishna Jibone Amar	Lucky Akhand, Tapan Chowdhury, Kumar Biswajit, Samina Chowdhury, Ayub Bachchu, James, Hasan
200?	Tomar Oronne	Lucky Akhand, Fahmida Nabi, Bappa Mazumder, Nipu
2019	The Akhand Brothers	Lucky Akhand, Happy Akhand, Shukla De

=== Only composition ===
Year	Album	Artist(s)
198?	Abar Elo Je Shondha	Happy Akhand
1999	Amay Dekona	Samina Chowdhury
1999	Dekha Hobe Bondhu	Ark
199?	Kobita Porar Prohor	Samina Chowdhury

=== Film scores ===
Year	Album
1980	Ghuddi
2009	Naroshundor

== Personal life and death ==
Akhand had a daughter Mum Minti. In 2015, he was diagnosed with grade-IV lung cancer. He was treated in Bangabandhu Sheikh Mujib Medical University and in a hospital in Bangkok, Thailand. He was moved to his residence in Armanitola, Dhaka in early April 2017 at Mitford Hospital, Dhaka. He died on 21 April. He was buried at Martyred Intellectuals Graveyard in Mirpur.

== Tribute ==
On 7 June 2019, on Akhand's 63rd birthday, he was honored with a Google Doodle.
