= Mahadi Faisal =

Bangladeshi singer

Mahadi Faisal মাহাদী ফয়সাল
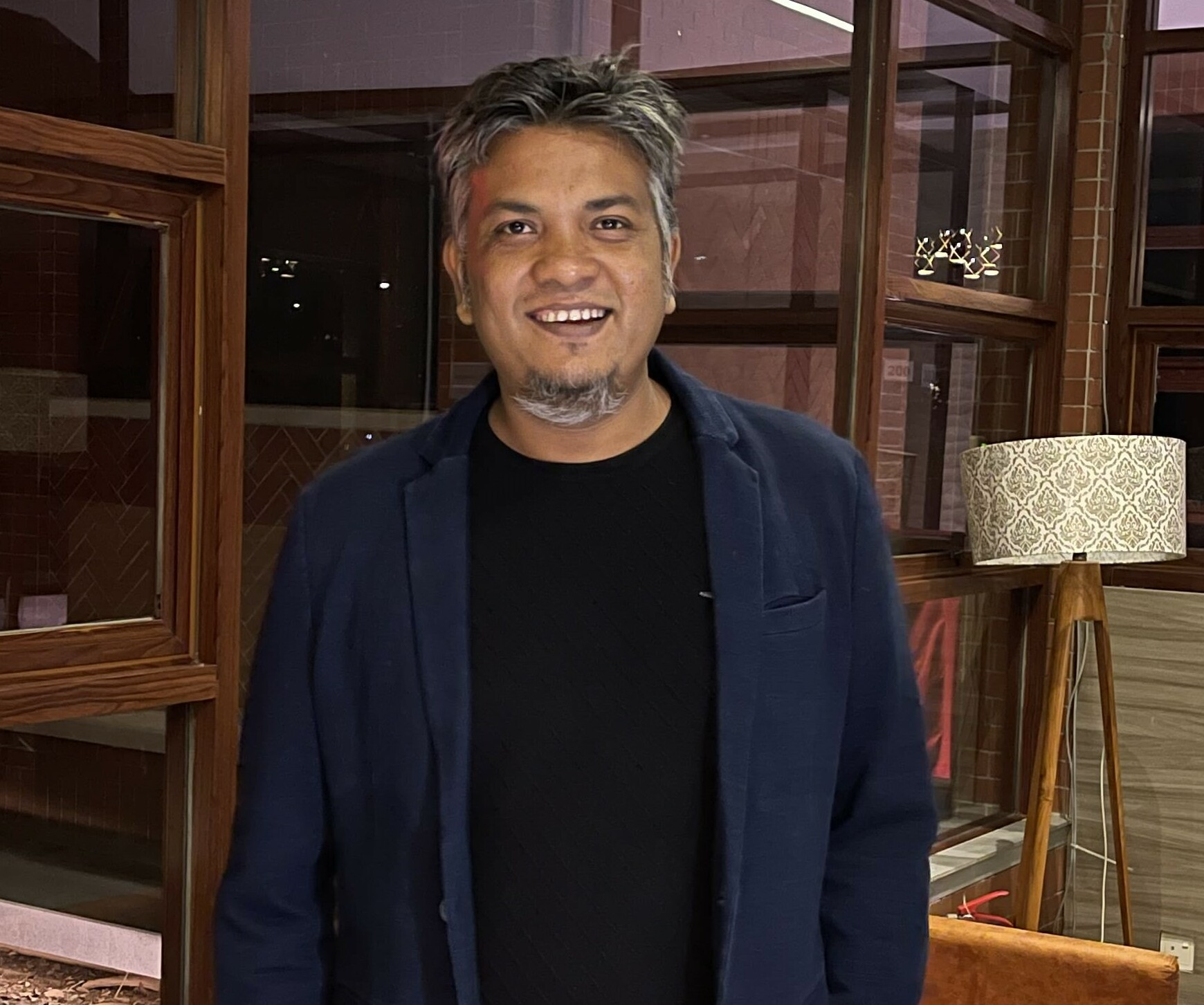

Background information
- Born: Bangladesh
- Occupations: Singer; Composer
- Labels: Gaanchill Music

Mahadi Faisal is a Bangladeshi singer and composer. He has released several albums and singles. He participated in the reality competition series for children, Notun Kuri, on Bangladesh Television (BTV) in 1995. In 2005, he participated in another musical reality show, Close Up-1. He launched his first album, titled Bondona in 2007, under the banner of Gaanchill Music. The lyrics of the album were penned by Asif Iqbal and composed by Prince Mahmud. The song "Tumi Boruna Hole Hobo Ami Sunil" from this album became popular. After that, he released singles "Shunil Boruna", "Megh Hoye Kado Bole", "Malik Rabbana", "Projapoti", "Chole Jeo Na" "Chele Manushi Bayna", "Antohin", "Antohin-2", "Keu Bojhe Toh Keu Bojhe Na" etc.

== Musical career ==
Mahadi Faisal's musical career started at a very young age. In 2007, Mahadi released his first album, Bondona, under the banner of Gaanchill Music. The lyrics of the album were written by Asif Iqbal and the music was composed by Prince Mahmud. He followed it up with more albums, including Antohin (a duet with Elita Karim), Onnorokom, and Antohin 2.

He has also lent his voice for several mixed projects, live shows, and singles. His latest single was with musician Minar, titled "Keu Bojhe Toh Keu Bojhe Na" was released in 2018.

In 2020, four artistes Mahadi Faisal, Elita Karim, Porshi and Mahtim Shakib sang the song together to motivate the fight against coronavirus titled "Jokhon Juddhe Achhi". The song is written by Asif Iqbal, composed by Shahbaz Khan Pilu. Prior to this the production company Ganchil has created a number of songs about coronavirus. Singer Mahadi Faisal was in overall management of the whole project.

In 2023, on the occasion of Mother's Day, Aranya Anwar's film Ma, Momtaz's song "Sonar Kathi Rupar Kathi" was written by Mahi Flora and jointly composed by Mahadi and Muntasir Tusher.

== Discography ==
Year of release	Song Name	Lyrics	Composition	Co-artist	Label	References
2007	Shunil Boruna	Asif Iqbal	Prince Mahmud		Gaanchill Music	
2007	Megh Hoye Kado Bole	Asif Iqbal	Prince Mahmud		Gaanchill Music	
2007	Malik Rabbana	Asif Iqbal	Prince Mahmud		Gaanchill Music	
2010	Hridoy	Asif Iqbal	Adit	Elita Karim	Gaanchill Music	
2010	Nijhum Raat	Asif Iqbal	Adit	Elita Karim	Gaanchill Music	
2010	Bhorer Shishir	Asif Iqbal	Adit	Elita Karim	Gaanchill Music	
2015	Projapoti	Asif Iqbal	Adit		Gaanchill Music	
2017	Onubhuti	Rabiul Isalm Jibon	Emon Chowdhury	Elita Karim	CMV Music	
2018	Keu Bojhe To Keu Bojhe Na	Asif Iqbal	Adit		Gaanchill Music	
2018	Chole Jeo Na	Asif Iqbal	Adit	Elita Karim	Gaanchill Music	
2019	Kar Kache Jai	Prince Mahmud	Prince Mahmud	Elita Karim	G-Series	
