= Labu =

Labu may refer to:

- Labu Rahman, a Bangladeshi musician, and member of the band Feedback
- Mukim Labu, Brunei
- Labu, Negeri Sembilan, Malaysia
- Labu Komuter station, a railway station
- Labu language
- Libu, an ancient Libyan tribe
- Pondok Labu, a sub-district of Cilandak district in Jakarta, Indonesia

== See also ==
- Labbu
- Labubu
