= Elita Karim =

Singer, journalist

- এলিটা করিম
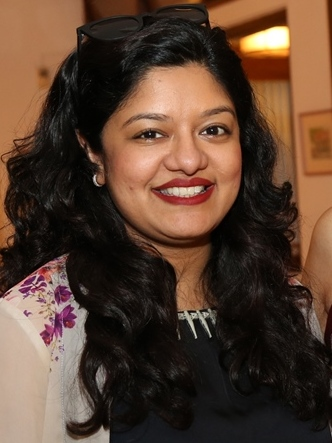
- Elita in 2017
- Born: Dilshad Karim Elita
- Citizenship: Bangladeshi
- Education: North South University
- Occupations: Singer, journalist, anchor, voice artist
- Years active: since 2009
- Spouse: Ashfaque Nipun (m. 2015)

Dilshad Karim Elita, better known as Elita Karim, is a Bangladeshi singer, journalist, versatile performer, anchor and voice artist. She is the vocalist of Raaga.

== Early life ==
Karim was born on 4 September 1982. She graduated in English literature from North South University.

== Career ==
In 2001, Karim released her first song in a band mixed album "Amar Prithibi" (lit. 'My world'). In 2009, she released a song entitled "Ontohin" with singer Mahadi Faisal. On 24 May 2015, her first solo studio album Elita was released. Karim made her debut as an actress in a serial Mukim Brothers which was broadcast on Channel i based on Mostofa Sarwar Farooki's story, written and directed by Ashfaque Nipun. Her acting in the drama was praised. She works as a journalist for a Bangladeshi English daily named The Daily Star.

In 2021, Karim earned Humphrey Fellowship at Walter Cronkite School of Journalism and Mass Communication in Arizona State University.

== Personal life ==
Karim married Ashfaque Nipun on 29 May 2015. Her brother Imrul Karim Emil is currently based in Toronto, Ontario, Canada and is also a popular singer who is the vocalist of the Bangladeshi pop rock band Shunno.

== Albums ==
=== Original ===
Elita (2015)
No.	Title	Length
1.	"Ure Jete Chai"	4:13
2.	"Maya"	5:25
3.	"Godhuli" (dusk)	4:41
4.	"Landphoner Dingulote Prem" (love in the days of landphones)	2:39
5.	"Bolona"	5:26
6.	"Bhenge Gelo Jorota"	4:33
7.	"Apekkha" (waiting)	5:35
8.	"Emon Keno Holo" (why this happened?)	5:35
Total length:		38:12

=== Mixed ===
Album name	Song name	Singers	Year
Rajotto	Chowa	Elita	2014
Ontohin	Hridoy (Duet) Nijhum Raat (Duet) Bhorer Shishir (Duet) Harano Akash	Elita & Mahadi Mahadi & Elita Elita & Mahadi Elita	2009
Okaron			2010

Akash Ebong Tumi (featured by Joy Shahriar) - 2015
