= Fahmida Nabi =

Bangladeshi singer

- ফাহমিদা নবী
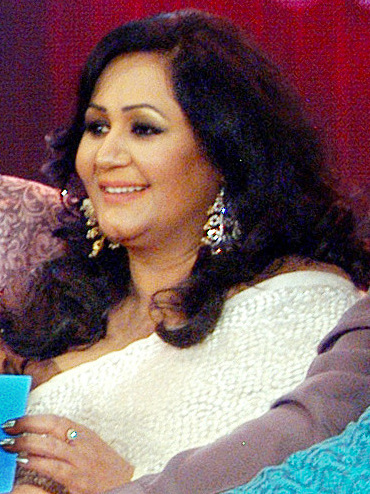
- Nabi in 2013
- Born: Fahmida Nabi Numa; 4 January 1964 (age 62); Dinajpur, Bangladesh
- Occupation: Singer
- Years active: 1979-present
- Spouse: Zainul Alam (m. 1987; died 2011)
- Children: 1
- Parent: Mahmudun Nabi (father)
- Relatives: Samina Chowdhury (sister); Pancham (brother)
- Awards: full list
- Musical career
- Genres: Modern, classical, Rabindra Sangeet
- Instruments: Vocals, harmonium
- Website: fahmidanabi.com

Fahmida Nabi (born 4 January 1964) is a Bangladeshi singer. She usually vocalizes classical and modern-style songs. She also sang songs of Rabindra Sangeet and Nazrul Geeti genre. She won Bangladesh National Film Award for Best Female Playback Singer for her performance in the film Aha! (2007). She also received Channel i Performance Award (2008) and the Meril-Prothom Alo Award (2008). She served as a judge for the reality television music show CloseUp 1. She is an ambassador of Bangladesh Center for Communication Programs (BCCP).

== Background and family ==
Nabi was born to Mahmudun Nabi & Rashida Chowdhury. She has 2 sisters named Samina Chowdhury & Tanzida Nabi and has 1 brother named Ridwan Nabi Pancham. Nabi was married to Zainul Alam till his death in 2011 and has a daughter named Farkhanda Anmola Alam.

== Career ==
Nabi's solo career started in 1979 and has spanned over three decades. She sings primarily classical and modern Bengali songs. Besides that, she sings Rabindra Sangeet and Nazrul Sangeet. Her first album is Tumi Tulonahina. On 15 January 2011, she released a solo album titled Akash O Shamudra Aupar, which features 10 songs written and tuned by Selim Al Deen. Her first duet album entitled Ek Mutho Gaan-1 (released in 2006) was recorded with Bappa Mazumder. Fahmida Nabi and Bappa Mazumder's second studio album Ek Mutho Gaan-2 was released on the Valentine's Day in 2010. Fahmida Nabi's Rabindra Sangeet album Amar Bela Je Jay was a classic hit.

== Discography ==
=== Mixed and solo albums ===
Year	Album title	Co-artist(s)	Music Composer	Lyricist(s)	Presents by	Notes
2015	Shada Kalo		Shan Shaik		Agnibina	Solo Modern Music Music
2016	Akash O Shomudra Opar	-	Bappa Mazumdar		Agnibina	Solo
2007	Aha!		Deb Joti Misra	Enamul Karim Narim Nirjhar	Laser Vison	Movie Song
2009	Thamche Ki?	Mehrin, SI Tutul, Milon Mahmud, Sajib, Proma	Laser Vison			
2014	Amare Chuiachile		Partha Mazumder		Music	Nazrul Geeti Album
	Nil Jhinuk er Kham	Rupangkor Bagchi			Laser Vison	Duet, Bangla modern song
2018	Bhul Kore Bhalobeshecci		Lucky Akhand, Nipo, Sajib Das, Fahmida Nabi	Golam Morshed	Bengal Foundation	Solo Modern
	Ek Mutho Gan	Bappa Mazumder			Agnibina	Bangla modern song
	Nichok Shwapno	Khaled	Tanvir Tarek		Fahim Music	Solo, Bangla Modern song
	Ek Mutho Gan 2	Bappa Mazumdar			Laser Vison	Duet, Bangla Modern song
2017	Shopno Golpo			Tomal	Laser Vison	Solo, Modern Song
2015	Tumi Ovimane			Golam Morshed	Laser Vison	Solo, Modern Song
2010	Tobu Brishti Chai				Laser Vison	Solo
2016	Kotota Amar Tumi	Kumar Biswajit		Joy Shahriar	Ajob Records	Duet
	Rong Berong er Manush		Tomal	Golam Morshed, Ahsan Kabir, Polash Mahbub, Tarik Mahmud, Akash and Srabon	Agnibina	Solo, Modern Song
2014	Icche Hoy		Nokib Khan, Pilu Khan	Julfiquer Rasel		Solo, Modern Song
	Onuvutir Choagulo	Subir Nandi				Duet
2017	Shurer Vubone				Soundtek	Solo
	Tin Tara	Ferdous Wahid, Agun Lyrics	Shahrid Belal		Adbox	Mixed
	Gan Bondhu	Lucky Akhand, Bappa Mazumder, Nisho	Golam Morshed		Laser Vison	Mixed
	Rabi Babur Gan	Bappa Mazumder, Juel, Sondipon, Said Hasan Tipu, Ajay MItra, Arnab Mitra, Nirjhar Choudhury, Shayla Rahaman			Laser Vison	Mixed, Rabindra
2013	Aay Bhalobasha	Lee'Mon, Al Amin			Agnibina	Mixed
2016	Dupurer Ekla Pakhi				Bengal Foundation	Solo, Modern Bangla
	Tumi Ki Sei Tumi				Soundtek	Solo
2007	Amar Bela Je Jay				Impress Audio Vision	Solo, Rabindra Music
	Jipshi Meghe	Shahnaz Rahamatullah, Abida Sultana, Bappa Mazumder, Rizia Parvin, Mizan, Akhi Alomgir, Alam Ara Minu, Rupom, SI Tutul, Santu Concept		Dr. Iqbal	Shondha Brishti	Mixed
	Nirbachita	Bappa Mazumder, Arifin Rumey, Kona, Shafiq Tuhin, Mahadi, Elita, Rumi, Priyanka Gope, Parvez	Prince Mahmud		Agnibina	Mixed
	Surer Uttorshuri				Impress Audio Vision Ltd	
2013	World Health Day Theme Song 2013		Fuad Ahmed Babu			Theme Song
2007	Ochena Valobasha	Bappa Mazumder, Shakila Jafar, SI Tutul, Toni, Tipu			Agnibina	Mixed
	Karigori 1	Raz Azim, Shamim Ara Munni, Kamrun Nahar, Pilu, Shamima Afroj Shima and others			Anmol	Mixed

=== Notable songs ===
- Meghla Mon
- Lukochuri Lukochuri Golpo
- Tumi Ki Shei Tumi
- Shada Kalo
- Akash Khule Boshe Achi
- Badoler Dintare
- Monta tomar
- Ami Akash Hobo
- Ichcheri batashe
- Fele Elam
- Bhul Kore Bhalobesechhi
- Ek Mutho Gaan

=== Other interests ===
Nabi is one of the judges of CloseUp1, a reality TV show on NTV (Bangladesh) from 2005 to 2013. She runs a voice modulation institution named "Karigori" since 2007 and works as voice grooming facilitator for that institution. Fahmida Nabi is an ambassador of Bangladesh Center for Communication Programs (BCCP). She is a regular columnist at Bangla Tribune, a very popular on-line newspaper in Bangladesh.

== Awards ==
=== Bangladesh National Film Award (2007) ===
Bangladesh National Film Award (2007) organized by ministry of information. Chief Adviser Dr. Fakhruddin Ahmed presented the awards at the Bangladesh- China Friendship Conference Centre on 23 October 2008. Nabi won the National Film Award as the Best Female Playback Singer in 2007 for her song "Lukochuri Lukochuri Golpo" in Bengali Film AHA.

=== The Lux Channel i Performance Award 2008 ===
The Lux Channel i Performance Award 2008 was held with glitz and glamour. The star-studded affair took place in Sharjah, United Arab Emirates on 14 November 2008. A group of 65 celebrities attend the event, which was held at the Sharjah Cricket Stadium. Fahmida nabi awarded Best female singer on that function.

=== The Diamond World-Rtv Star Award-2014 ===
The Diamond World-Rtv Star Award-2014 was held 8 March 2015, honouring the best of Rtv's programmes from 1 January to 31 December 2014. Fahmida Nabi got Best Female Singer of the year for her outstanding performance through the year.

=== Meril Prothom Alo Awards (2007) ===
Meril Prothom Alo Awards or Prothom Alo Awards is an annual Bangladeshi awards ceremony honouring cinematic achievements in Bangladeshi Film Industry. the awards are given everyyear at the Bangabandhu International Conference Center (BICC). Meril Prothom Alo Awards is Bangladesh's equivalent to America's Academy Awards. Fahmida Nabi got best singer (Female) award 2007 for her song lukochuri golpo from movie Aha!

=== Citycell-Channel i Music Awards ===
The biggest award ceremony of Bangladeshi music, the 9th Citycell-Channel i Music Awards was held at the Al-Ahli stadium in Qatar's capital, Doha. Combining critics' choice and popular choice, a total of 18 awards will be given in various categories, including Rabindra Sangeet, Nazrul Sangeet, classical, folk, modern, film, band and fusion music, along with music direction, lyrics, cover design and music video. Fahmida Nabi also received Award for Best singer(Modern Song) in 9th Citycell Channel-i Music Award. She has received Best Singer (Modern Song) Award once again in 2022.

=== Others Award ===
- Bangladesh Journalist Association Award 2006 for The Best Female Singer.
- BBC Popular Singer Award 2005.
- Bangladesh Film Journalist Association Award 2006 for The Best Female Singer.
- Bangladesh Journalist Association Award 2006 for The Best Female Singer.
