= Mukhosh (band) =

- First album published on 2000

Background information
- Origin: Dhaka, Bangladesh
- Years active: 1997–present
- Labels: Soundtek
- Members: Khalid Hossain Raju; S M Khosrose Mohit
- Past members: Bullet Shamim; Abu Muhit Mintu

Mukhosh (Bengali: মুখোশ) is a 1990s blues band based in Dhaka, Bangladesh. The band was formed by Khalid Hossain Raju (vocals) and S M Khosrose Mohit (drummer) in 1997. They released their first self-titled album Mukhosh from the banner of recording company Soundtek in 2000. After 2000, the band was inactive for 17 years and reappeared with their second album Digital Bhalobasha in December 2017.

== History ==
The band was formed in March 1997. The founding members of the band were Khalid Hossain Raju and S M Khosrose Mohit. They named the band “Mukhosh”, which means “Mask”. Their first self-titled album was from the banner of record label company Soundtek in 2000. After releasing this album the band team received audience response and that time a couple of singles became very popular. They had to take a long break due to professional reasons after 2001. In 2016, Mukhosh had a reunion and decided to run the band professionally. Then they started practicing again and released their second album Digital Bhalobasha in December 2017.

== Discography ==
Albums
No.	Name	Year of release	Label	No. of songs
1	Mukhosh	2000	Soundtek	12
2	Digital Bhalobasha	2017	Entertainment	2
3	Chena Mukh	2018	Soundtek	3
4	Fashionable Boishakh	2018	YR Music	4

== Popular songs ==
- Aey Orna
- Boro Hobe
- Dekha Jaak
- Dhur Chai
- Ichche Gulo
- Jorina
- Kabliwala
- Ke Boleche
- Lat Pat Kore
- Opekkha
- Probashi
- Shanti Chai Shanti
- Fb Page Like//Rayofmusic (Shid Bhuiyan)

== Band members ==
=== 1997–2001 ===
- S M Khosrose Mohit – Drummer and band leader
- Khalid Hossain Raju – Guitar and vocal
- Bullet Shamim – Keyboard and vocal
- Abu Muhit Mintu – Bass and vocal

=== 2016–present ===
- S M Khosrose Mohit – Drummer and band leader
- Khalid Hossain Raju – Guitar and vocal
