= Khalid (Bangladeshi singer) =

Bangladeshi singer (died 2024)

Khalid (1 August 1965 - 18 March 2024) born Khalid Anwar Saifullah, was a Bangladeshi singer and one of the pioneers of Bangladeshi pop music in the 1980s and 1990s. Hailing from Gopalganj, he began his musical career in 1981, inspired by legendary singer Bhupen Hazarika’s songs "Ganga Amar Ma" and "Padma Amar Ma".

== Early life and career ==
As a child, Khalid won a gold medal in an Azan competition in Gopalganj. During his university years at Dhaka University, he collaborated with artists like Fahmida Nabi and recorded duets such as "Ghumao Tumi Ghumao Re Jaan".

In 1983, he became the lead vocalist of the Dhaka-based band Chime, alongside Ashiquzzaman Tulu and Aly Sumon. Their debut attracted a crowd of around 30,000 in Gulistan, Dhaka. Chime's breakthrough came with the 1987 hit song "Nati Khati Bela Gelo", which became a generational anthem.

He was known for beginning rehearsals with an emotionally resonant Azan, praised by his bandmates as "ethereal".

== Solo career ==
Khalid also gained popularity as a solo artist, with hit songs such as "Shorolotar Protima", "Jodi Himaloy Hoye", "Kono Karonei", "Tumi Nei Tai", and "Akashtake". He collaborated extensively with composer Prince Mahmud on various mixed albums that shaped Bangladesh's pop-rock sound in the 1990s.

In 2007, he released the solo album Ghumao, which also received critical acclaim.

== Style and influence ==
Khalid’s musical style blended pop, rock, and folk, with his emotive and spiritual voice becoming iconic in Bangladeshi FM radio culture. Peers such as Samina Chowdhury and Shafin Ahmed praised his humility and unique expression.

== Personal life and death ==
Khalid later migrated to the United States with his wife and son but remained active in the local music scene during visits to Bangladesh.

He died from a heart attack in Dhaka on 18 March 2024, at the age of 60. He collapsed at a restaurant in Panthapath around 6:10 pm and was declared dead at 7:15 pm at a local hospital. He was buried in his hometown Gopalganj following a Janaza prayer in Dhaka.

== Legacy ==
Khalid is widely regarded as a foundational figure in modern Bangladeshi pop music. His songs continue to be celebrated, and fellow musicians have called for preserving and promoting his musical legacy for future generations.
