= Soundtek =

Bangladeshi record label

- Parent company: Soundtek Electronics Limited
- Founded: 1992
- Founder: Sultan Mahmud
- Status: Active
- Distributor: Soundtek
- Genre: Various (Music, Film, Drama)
- Country of origin: Bangladesh
- Location: 62, Shop No: 21,2nd Floor, Moon Complex, Rabia-Elaas Market, Patuatuli, Dhaka 1100
- Official website: soundtek.com.bd

Soundtek is one of the famous old record label companies in Bangladesh, which produces cassettes, CDs, VCDs and DVDs. Soundtek is one of the premier record labels in Bangladesh. The owner of the company is Sultan Mahmud.

== History ==
In 1992, Soundtek was established by Sultan Mahmud. Soundtek YouTube channel crossed one million subscribers within just one year. The company has published over 1,500 albums since 1992. Soundtek's last tape-recorded audio cassette was Rakib Mosabbir's 'Jare Amar Mon', which was released in 2008.

== Types ==
- Audio album
- Video album
- Music video
- Drama

== Notable artists ==
=== Musicians ===
- Asif Akbar
- Ayub Bachchu
- Pial Hasan
- Andrew Kishore
- Partha Barua
- Minar Rahman
- Tamal Hadiul
- Ferdous Wahid
- Shafin Ahmed
- Rakib Mosabbir
- Zhilik

=== Bands ===
- Mukhosh
- Souls
- Warfaze
- Ark
- Feedback

== See also ==
- List of Bangladeshi record labels
