= Foad Nasser Babu =

Foad Nasser Babu ফুয়াদ নাসের বাবু
- Born: 31 May 1960 (age 66); Kushtia, Bangladesh
- Genres: Pop rock; Soft rock; Blues
- Occupations: Musician; Songwriter; Composer
- Instrument: Keyboards
- Years active: 1972–present
- Labels: Sargam Records; Soundtek; G-Series
- Member of: Feedback

Foad Nasser Babu (born 31 May 1960) is a Bangladeshi music composer. He is the founder, band leader, music composer, lyricist, singer and the keyboardist of Feedback, a Bangladeshi band. He also plays piano, bass guitar, and rhythm both in session music recordings and live shows.

He composes music for radio and television commercials, theme and background score for drama, feature films, documentaries and songs for solo artists.

Babu composed station ID music for Channel 1 and Desh TV.

As a bass guitarist he has been performing with Runa Laila for the last four decades.

== Career ==
In 1972, Babu composed his first song "Abar Eshechhe Shey Muktir Logno" - a Gono Sangeet (inspirational songs for the masses) written by Ahmed Bashir, performed by Shomonbo i Shilpi Goshthi. "Udashi Ey Mone" was his first recorded song.

Babu owns the recording studio Art of Noise in Dhaka.

== Discography ==
=== Band ===
- উল্লাস (Cheers) (1987)
- মেলা (Carnival) (1990)
- বংগাব্দ ১৪০০ (Bengali Year 1400) (1994)
- বাউলিয়ানা (Bauliana) (1996)
- দেহঘড়ি (Body clock) (1997)
- ০২ (02)

==== Mixed ====
- Rongomela Vol.1
- Together
- Kiron
- Adda
- 6 Band Mixed '99
- Aloron
- Millennium
