= Ghuddi =

Bangladeshi romantic drama film

- Bengali: ঘুড্ডি
- Directed by: Syed Salahuddin Zaki
- Written by: Syed Salahuddin Zaki
- Starring: Raisul Islam Asad; Subarna Mustafa; Nasiruddin Yousuff; Tariq Anam Khan; Nayla Azad Nupur; Syed Hasan Imam; Golam Mustafa; Happy Akhand
- Cinematography: Shafiqul Islam Swapan
- Edited by: Saidul Anam Tutul
- Music by: Lucky Akhand
- Production company: Cinema commiune
- Distributed by: Cinema commiune
- Release date: 19 December 1980
- Running time: 145 minutes
- Country: Bangladesh
- Language: Bengali

Ghuddi is a 1980 Bangladeshi romantic drama film directed by Syed Salahuddin Zaki, who also wrote the story, and did the screenplay and dialogue. It is the first film directed by Syed Salahuddin Zaki. Subarna Mustafa has played the main role in film with Raisul Islam Asad, Nasir Uddin Yusuf, Tariq Anam Khan, Nayla Azad Nupur, Syed Hasan Imam and Happy Akhand in supporting roles.। Subarna Mustafa debuted in the film. In the film, Raisul Islam Asad was a freedom fighter in the film and he is also a freedom fighter in the real life.

Ghuddi was released on 19 December 1980. In the film, Syed Salahuddin Zaki won best dialogue writer award and Shafiqul Islam Swapan won the Best Cinematography award for the 6th Bangladesh National Film Awards.

== Story ==
The movie revolves around the protagonist Asad, a freedom fighter who still struggles to get out of the trauma of war. He meets Ghuddi at a film theatre and later falls in love.

== Cast ==
- Raisul Islam Asad - Asad
- Subarna Mustafa - Ghuddi
- Nasiruddin Yousuff - Bachchu
- Tariq Anam Khan - Tariq
- Nayla Azad Nupur - Nupur
- Syed Hasan Imam - Mr. Hasan, Ghuddi's father
- Jhumur Akhter Riya as Sathi
- Golam Mustafa - Majhi
- Happy Akhand - Happy, Ghuddi's friend (Special Appearance)
- Farid Ali
- Mahbub Ali
- Rokeya Abbas
- Mamun Chowdhury
- Arun Dutt

== Music ==
Ghuddi

Soundtrack album by Lucky Akhand
- Released: 1980
- Recorded: 1980
- Genre: Feature film soundtrack
- Label: G - Series
- Producer: Cinema commiune

Lucky Akhand chronology
Ghuddi (1980)	Naroshundor (2009)
External audio
- Audio Jukebox on YouTube

Ghuddi's music directed was by Lucky Akhand. The film is praised for its excellent music, especially Happy Akhand's performance. Lyrics by Kausar Ahmed Chaudhury. The songs are performed by Happy Akhand, Syed Abdul Hadi, Shahnaz Rahmatullah and Shimul Yusuf and Linu Billah.

=== Soundtrack ===
All music is composed by Lucky Akhand.

No.	Title	Writer(s)	Artist(s)	Length
1.	"Abar Elo Je Shondha"	S.M Hedayat	Happy Akhand	4:21
2.	"Ke Bashi Bajayere?"	S.M Hedayat	Happy Akhand
3.	"Ghum Ghum Chokhe"	Kausar Ahmed Chaudhury	Shahnaz Rahmatullah	5:28
4.	"Sokhi Cholo Na"	Kausar Ahmed Chaudhury	Syed Abdul Hadi	3:51
5.	"Jemon Nadir Jole"	Syed Salahuddin Zaki	Shimul Yousuf and Linu Billah

=== Personnel ===
Singer(s)

- Happy Akhand
- Shahnaz Rahmatullah
- Syed Abdul Hadi
- Shimul Yousuf
- Linu Billah

Composition, Music, Music Arrangement

- Lucky Akhand

Lyricist(s)

- S.M Hedayat
- Kausar Ahmed Chaudhury
- Syed Salahuddin Zaki

== Awards ==
National Film Awards

- Won: Best Dialogue - Syed Salahuddin Zaki
- Won: Best Choreography - Shafiqul Islam Swapan
