= Naquib Khan =

Naquib Khan নকীব খান
- Born: Naquib Uddin Khan; 18 March 1960 (age 66); Chittagong, Bangladesh
- Occupations: Singer, music composer, lyricist and director
- Spouse: Nusrat Khan (m. 1993)

Naquib Uddin Khan (born 18 March 1960) is a Bangladeshi singer, music composer, lyricist and director. He is the lead singer of the Bangladeshi band Renaissance, which he formed in 1985. He was a member of the band Souls.

== Early life ==
Khan was born on 18 March 1960 in Chunati Union of Lohagara Upazila of Chittagong District. His father's name is Ayub Khan and mother's name is Akhtar Jahan Khan

== Career ==
Khan got involved with band music in his teenage years. He made his musical debut as a singer and pianist in a band called Balark. Then joined Souls in 1974. After his joining, they started composing songs with their own tunes and lyrics. After working in Souls for ten years, he left Chittagong and moved to Dhaka and formed a band called Renaissance in 1985. Three years later, in 1988, the band's debut album, Renaissance, was released. The second album was released in 1993 titled Tritio Bishsho, the third in 1998 titled Ekattorer Renaissance. That same year, the popular album Ei Deshe Ek Shohor Chhilo – Elomelo was also released, for which the music was composed by him, lyrics were written by Kausar Ahmed Chaudhury, and vocals were provided by Nafis Kamal. The fourth album titled Ekush Shotoker Renaissance in 2004.

== Personal life ==
Khan has two brothers named Pilu Khan and Jalaluddin Khan Zilu. Khan married Nusrat Khan in 1993 and has a daughter named Fabiha Khan and a son named Zarif Khan.

He was previously married to singer Samina Chowdhury but eventually divorced.
