= Happy Akhand =

Bangladeshi singer (1960–1987)

- হ্যাপি আখন্দ
- Born: Zia Hasan Akhand; 12 October 1960; Dhaka, East Pakistan, (now Dhaka, Bangladesh)
- Died: 28 December 1987 (aged 27); Dhaka, Bangladesh
- Other name: The Prince of Bangladeshi Rock
- Citizenship: Bangladeshi
- Occupations: Singer-songwriter; musician; composer; record producer
- Years active: 1975–1987
- Father: Abdul Ali Akhand (father)
- Relatives: Lucky Akhand (brother)
- Musical career
- Genres: Pop; Adhunik (modern); blues rock; soft rock
- Instruments: Vocals; bass guitar; keyboards; piano
- Labels: Sargam Records; MMI; G-Series
- Formerly of: Miles; Spondan

Happy Akhand (pronounced 'Happy Akhondo') was a Bangladeshi rock singer, songwriter, composer, guitarist, keyboardist and record producer. He was one of the pioneering rock musicians of Bangladesh. He was the founding member of the rock band Miles. He is sometimes referred to as the Prince of Bangladeshi Rock. His notable songs include the title "আবার এলো যে সন্ধ্যা (The Evening is Here Again)", "কে বাঁশি বাজায় রে? (Who's Playing the Flute?)" and more. He died on 28 December 1987, at the age of 27 years.

== Early life ==
Zia Hasan 'Happy' Akhand was born on 12 October 1960 in Patla Khan Lane, Dhaka, East Pakistan (now Dhaka, Bangladesh). He was a student of West End High School. He started learning guitar at the age of 10. He started his music career with the help of his elder brother Lucky Akhand. In 1972, he joined the band Spondan as a keyboard player. In 1979, he founded the rock band Miles along with Farid Rashid.

== Discography ==
=== Solo ===
	Album	Year
1	Abar Elo Je Shondha	1975

=== Film score ===
	Album	Year
1	Ghuddi	1980

=== Band (Miles) ===
	Album	Year
1	Miles	1982
2	A Step Farther	1986

=== Spondan ===
	Album	Year
1	Spondan Bangladesh	1975

== Filmography ==
	Film	Year	Character
1	Ghuddi	1980	Happy, Ghuddi's friend (Not as himself)
