= Syed Salahuddin Zaki =

Bangladeshi film director, producer and film writer (1946–2023)

- সৈয়দ সালাউদ্দিন জাকী
- Born: 26 August 1946; Tangail, Dhaka Division, Bengal Province, British India
- Died: 18 September 2023 (aged 77); Dhaka, Bangladesh
- Occupations: Music director, lyricist
- Years active: 1980–2023
- Notable work: Ghuddi
- Awards: National Film Award

Syed Salahuddin Zaki (26 August 1946 – 18 September 2023) was a Bangladeshi film director, producer, and film writer. He won the Bangladesh National Film Award for Best Dialogue for the film Ghuddi (1980). He was awarded Ekushey Padak in 2021. Zaki died in Dhaka on 18 September 2023, at the age of 77.

== Selected films ==
=== As a director ===
- 1980 – Ghuddi
- 2022 – Ja Hariye Jay

=== As a producer ===
- 1980 – Ghuddi
- 1990 – Laal Benarasi
- 1990 – Ayna Bibir Pala

=== As a writer ===
- 1980 – Ghuddi
- 1984 – Agami
- 1992 – Utthan Poton
- 1993 – Shey
- 1993 – Nodir Naam Modhumoti
- 1996 – Meghla Akash
- 2001 – Lalsalu

== Awards and nominations ==
National Film Awards

Year	Award	Category	Film	Result
1980	National Film Award	Best Dialogue	Ghuddi	Won
