= Kausar Ahmed Chaudhury =

Bangladeshi astrologer and lyricist (1944–2022)

Kausar Ahmed Chowdhury
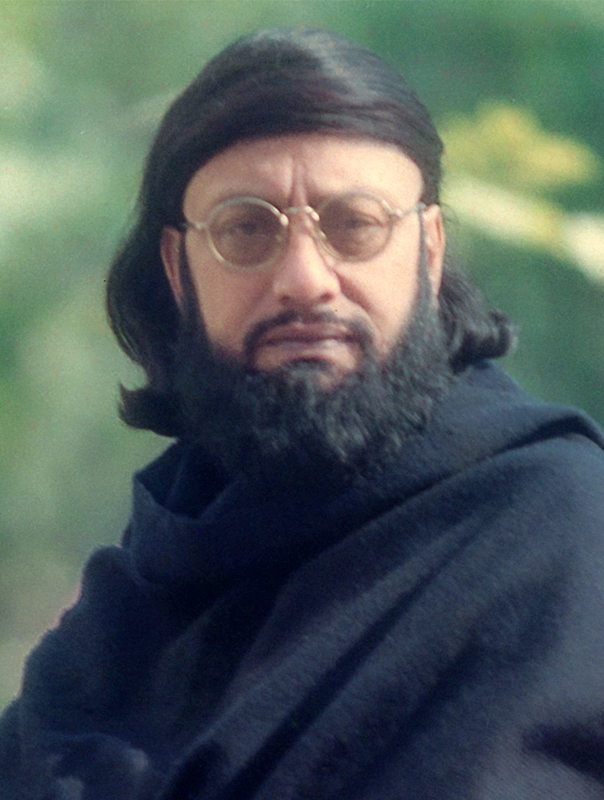
- Born: 16 December 1944; Sylhet District, British Raj
- Died: 22 February 2022 (aged 77) Dhaka
- Occupations: Astrologer, lyricist

Kausar Ahmed Chaudhury (16 December 1944 – 22 February 2022) was a Bangladeshi lyricist & astrologer.

He gained his fame as an astrologer for his regular horoscope readings in satirical way on Apnar Rashi (your zodiac sign) in the Daily Prothom Alo. He wrote classic Bengali songs for many singers and bands, like Love Runs Blind, Samina Chowdhury, Lucky Akhand, Niaz Mohammad Chowdhury and others. He was a freedom fighter and worked as an intelligence for the Provisional Government of Bangladesh during Bangladesh Liberation War in 1971.

Among his popular songs are "Rupali Guitar" (LRB), "Amay Deko Na Ferano Jabe Na" (Samina Chowdhury, Lucky Aakhand), "Jekhane Simanto Tomar" (Kumar Bishwajit), "Kobita Porar Prohor" (Samina Chowdhury), "Aj Ei Brishti'r Kanna Dekhe" (Niaz Mohammad Chowdhury), "Moushumi 1 (Feedback), "Koto Je Khunjechi Tomay" (Niloy Das), "Sokhi Cholona" (Sayed Abdul Hadi, Movie: Ghuddi) and others.

== Early life ==
Chaudhury was born on 16 December 1944 in Sylhet District of the then British Raj (later Pakistan, then East Pakistan and now Bangladesh). He graduated in drawing and sketching from the Fine Art Institute of Dhaka University.

== Career ==
Chaudhury started practicing astrology when he was 11 years old. He started writing lyrics when he was a student of Dhaka University. At his early age, he joined the government service. Besides writing lyrics, he also wrote few scripts for TV drama and directed many of them.

== Death ==
Chaudhury died on 22 February 2022, at the age of 77, from COVID-19, during the COVID-19 pandemic in Bangladesh. He was buried on 23 February 2022 at the Azimpur graveyard, Dhaka. Before burying, his funeral prayer was performed at Musjid-Ut-Taqwa in Dhanmondi.
