= Labu Rahman =

Labu Rahman লাবু রহমান
- Born: Lutful Ahmed Labu; 3 March 1958 (age 68); Shantinager, Dhaka.
- Genres: Blues, Blues Rock
- Occupations: Musician, singer-songwriter, composer and Guitar teacher.
- Instruments: Lead Guitar, Bass Guitar
- Years active: 1974– present
- Labels: worked with : Sound tech, Shangeeta, Sargam, His Master's Voice
- Member of: Feedback
- Formerly of: Uccharon, Symphony, Ananda
- Spouse: Smeeta Kazi

Lutful Ahmed Labu (born 3 March 1958), better known as Labu Rahman, S/O Abdur Rahman Akhanjee Mother Latifa Khatoon Spouse Smeeta Kazi is a Bangladeshi musician, singer, songwriter, composer and Guitar teacher. He is one of the senior guitarists in Bangladesh who played guitar as a session musician with many legendary singers of Bangladesh Like : Sabina Yasmin, Andrew Kishwer, Baby Naznen, Sheik Ishtiak, Kumar Biswajit, Saba Tani and many more artists as live and in their albums. His current band is 'Feedback' which is also one of the old and famous music bands in Bangladesh. Labu Rahman has also many guitar students who are playing guitar in many famed music bands.

== Career ==
He started playing guitar in 1973. He joined the band Ananda in 1975. In 1977 he joined Uccharon, the band of Azam Khan.During playing guitar with 'Azam Khan', he wrote and composed a hit song 'Ami Jare Chai re Shey thake Morei Ontore'. He stayed for a couple of years with Azam khan, and in 1980 he started playing in the band Symphony at the Merry Anderson, floating restaurant in Pagla near Narayanganj. By this time, he had become a professional musician, playing in orchestras as a session musician in Dhaka, as well as touring internationally with national artists of Bangladesh.

He joined the band Feedback in 1986, and created many memorable songs with the band. He works with the band as lead guitarist and second vocalist. As a singer he has some popular songs along with Feedback, and his few popular songs are : "Bidrohi", "Chotto Pakhi" ,"Ei Bisshew", "Shukhi Manusher Veeray", " Anondo", "Jiboon Ta jeno Golpo" ,"Ami jare chai re" ,"Jani Na","Keno tumi " He is still making music for his audiences and fans.

== Discography ==
=== Solo ===
- Bheja Ki Noyon
- I Wish
- Cocaine

=== Mixed ===
- Rongomela Vol.1
- Together
- Kiron
- Adda
- 6 Band Mixed '99
- Aloron
- Millennium

=== Band (Feedback) ===
- উল্লাস (Cheers) (1987)
- মেলা (Carnival) (1990)
- বংগাব্দ ১৪০০ (Bengali Year 1400) (1994)
- বাউলিয়ানা (Bauliana) (1996)
- দেহঘড়ি (Body clock) (1997)
- ০২ (02)
- Joar ( weave ) 1993 His Master's Voice India

=== Composition ===
- Tumi Megh Hole
