= Ark (Bangladeshi band) =

Bangladeshi rock band

Ark আর্ক্
- Origin: Dhaka City, Bangladesh
- Genres: Pop rock; Soft rock; Hard rock
- Years active: 1991–2002, 2010–present
- Labels: Sargam; Soundtek; Sangeeta; G-Series
- Members: Syed Hasanur Rahman; Tinku Azizur Rahman; Ferdous Noor Pushpo; Rajan Ahmed; Shimul Azhar; Riyadh Sarwar
- Past members: Ashiquzzaman Tulu; Partha Sharothi Mazumder; Ridwan Nabi Pancham; Rezwan Sheikh; Habib Anwar Joy; Shamsul Farid; Jahangir Alam; Hassan Towhidur Rahman Rumi; Shamim Ahmed; Arif Shishir; Ferdous; Mobin; Shumon; Buno; Md Imtiaz Ali Zimi; Mehedi

Ark is a Bangladeshi rock band formed in 1991 in Dhaka City by keyboardist Ashiquzzaman Tulu. The original founder members are Ashiquzzaman Tulu, Ridwan Nabi Pancham and Shamim. As of 2017, the band line-up re-consists of lead vocalist Syed Hasanur Rahman, keyboardist Tinku Azizur Rahman and drummer Hassan Towhidur Rahman (Rumi Rahman).

Since their debut album "মুক্তিযুদ্ধ (Muktijuddho)" in 1991, the band has released five studio albums and some contributed albums. These have included songs like "আমি পাহাড়ের চূরায় (Ami Paharer Churay)", "ভুলে গেছি (Bhuley Gechi)", "সুইটি (Sweety)", "যারে যা (Jare Ja)", "দূরে বহু দূরে (Doorey Bohu Doorey)", "সেই মেয়েটি (Shei Meyeti)" which have all been top hits in Bangladeshi Rock music.

Ark rose to fame in the 1990s, and is one of the "Big Three of Rock" along with Feelings/Nagar Baul and LRB, who were responsible for developing and popularizing rock music in Bangladesh in the 1990s.

== History ==
=== Formation and "মুক্তিযুদ্ধ (Liberation War)" (1991–1992) ===
Ark was formed in 1991 in Dhaka City by keyboardist and vocalist Ashiquzzaman Tulu when he met guitarist Pancham, who was playing guitar in the studio.

Ashiquzzaman Tulu was a prominent figure in the Bangladeshi rock music industry in the 1980s and 1990s, who was a founder member of Chime, along with Khalid, Shauqat Ali Emon and aly Sumon (current vocal of Pentagon).

Tulu was the principal composer of Chime. In the late 1980s, after the release of their second album, there was a huge dispute between Chime and Winning, another legendary contemporary band, over the rights to the track "মন কী যে চায়? (What the Heart Wants?)". The song was written, tuned and composed by Haydar Hossain of the band Winning, and was also included in Winning's debut album. Winning won the rights to the song in a Trial. This episode was detrimental to Chime's reputation and eventually, Ashiquzzaman Tulu left Chime.

Frustrated Tulu started his career as a composer, but as a veteran band musician, couldn't live without being in a band. When he met Pancham and some other musicians, most notably Partha Majumder, elder brother of Bappa Mazumdar, he formed the band Ark.

The band's first line-up consisted of keyboardist and vocalist Ashiquzzaman Tulu, lead guitarist and vocalist Pancham, Partha Pratim, lead vocalist Shamim, bassist Ferdous, Mobin and Jagu. This first line-up was without a drummer.

Ark released their first studio album, "মুক্তিযুদ্ধ (Liberation War)", from the record label Sargam Records in 1991. This album featured the songs "সেদিনো আকাশে (That Day In the Sky)" and "হারিকেন লুন্ঠন (Hurricane Lantern)", which was a failure. "সেদিনো আকাশে (That Day in the Sky)" was originally a Chime song composed by Tulu, based on the tune of the theme song of the movie Casablanca.

In late 1991, Ferdous, Mobin and Jagu left the band and went abroad. In 1992, Raja joined Ark as a vocalist and Shishir joined as a bassist. Both were from the band Rock Brigade. They were part of the band when Ark performed at its first concert, arranged by BAMBA at the University of Dhaka on 26 April 1992.

=== "তাজমহল (Tajmahal)" (1993–1996) ===
In 1993, Hasan joined Ark as its lead vocalist, having been recommended by his good friend Ridwan Nabi Pancham.

Then Joy from LRB joined Ark as a drummer. Ark finally had a complete line-up and started working on their second album. In 1994, Joy left the band and Rezwan joined as the drummer from the band Phantom Lord. By the end of 1994, Shishir left the band for going abroad and was replaced by Bulbul in 1995, from the band Prometheus as a touring bassist.

Ark signed a record deal with Soundtek for their second studio album in late 1995.

In 1996, Ark released their second studio album, "তাজমহল (Tajmahal)", on Soundtek. The album was a phenomenal success and the band became one of the most popular rock bands of the 1990s. The album featured the songs "সুইটি", "একাকী ", "তাজমহল", "গুরু", "পাগল মন which are still all big hits in band music industry. "Sweety" became the most popular and one of the biggest hit in Bangladesh that year, and continues to be a Bangladeshi rock staple. It is a signature song of ARK.

In late 1996, Bulbul became a full member of the band as the bassist, and Bahlam and Iqbal Asif Jewel(Legend / Miles) joined Ark as guest guitarists.

=== "জন্মভূমি (Birthplace)" (1997–1998) ===
In 1997, after the huge success of "তাজমহল (Tajmahal)", Ark signed another record deal with Soundtek for their third studio album. Also in 1997, Ark released their first contributed album, "ধূন", along with Souls, Nagar Baul, LRB, Feedback and Warfaze, on Soundtek. The album featured two songs from Ark "কত রাত (How Many Nights)" and "দূরে বহু দূরে (Far Far Away)".

Ark performed at a blockbuster concert along with Souls, Nagar Baul and LRB which was arranged by Ontor Showbiz at 1997. In late 1997, Rezwan left the band and Tonty replaced him as the drummer.

In 1998, Ark released their third studio album, "জন্মভূমি (Birthplace)" on Soundtek. It was a huge success and Ark became one of the top bands in the history of Bangladeshi rock music. The album featured the songs "যারে যা (Go Away)", "এই দূর প্রবাসে (In This Far Foreign Land)" and "Bangladesh", which were all smash hits.

After the huge success of "জন্মভূমি (Birthplace)" in 1998, Then the line up changed Again.

Hassan Towhidur Rahman (Rumi Rahman) is replaced as the drummer. Then Ark got busy with stage shows around the country.

=== "স্বাধীনতা (Freedom)" (1999–2000) ===
After the huge success of "জন্মভূমি"(Motherland)",

Ark signed another record deal with Soundtek for their fourth studio album. The band performed their hits regularly in concerts.

In 1999, Ark released their second contributed album, "6 Band '99" along with Souls, LRB, Prometheus, Feedback and Warfaze, on Soundtek. The album featured two songs "আয়না (Mirror)" and "মেতে আজ উঠি' (Arise Today)".

In 2000, Ark released their fourth studio album, "স্বাধীনতা (Freedom)" from Soundtek. The featuring songs are "প্রেমা (Love)", "আর কতো মিথ্যে ? (How Many death?)" "বন্ধু (Friend)" songs were very successful.

In late 2000, after the major success of "স্বাধীনতা" (Freedom)", Hassan left the band & formed a new band called "স্বাধীনতা"(Freedom)".

This was the end of Ark's period with this lineup, until their reunion, reformation and relaunch in 2010.

=== "হারান মাঝি (Haran Majhi)" (2002) ===
Ashiquzzaman Tulu, while living in Canada was heartbroken when he got the news of Ark breaking up from Hasan and Pancham. He decided to continue his dream band.

He met Autumnal Moon, an extraordinarily talented musician from Khulna. The two reformed Ark and started to work on a new album, released in 2002. On this album, Tulu played keyboards and bass guitar,

=== Reformation (2010–present) ===
In late 2010, Ark announced that they had reformed the band and would return to concerts that year. After 10 years, Syed Hasanur Rahman finally rejoined Ark as the lead vocalist, but Pancham did not return. The band's line-up was:- lead vocalist Hasan, lead guitarist Tito, bassist Sohel, keyboardist Nabil Salahuddin and Hassan Towhidur Rahman(Rumi Rahman) on drums.

The band started performing regularly again at various concerts.

Ark performed at the "Old is Gold" concert along with Nova, Souls, Nagar Baul, LRB, Miles, Feedback and Warfaze. This concert was arranged by Sufiana at the Bangladesh Army Stadium on 16 November 2012.

== Members ==
Present members

- Syed Hasanur Rahman – vocals (1993–2000; 2010–present)
- Tinku Azizur Rahman – keyboards (2010–present)
- Pushpo Ferdous – guitars (2024–present)
- Rajan Islam – guitars (2024–present)
- Shimul Azahar – bass guitars (2022–present)
- Riyadh Sarwar– drums (2022–present)

Past members

- Ashiquzzaman Tulu (Founder Member)- keys & Vocals (1991–)
- Ridwan Nabi Pancham (Founder Member)– Guitars & Vocals
- Raza – Vocals(1991–2002)
- Shamim – Vocals. (1991–1996)
- Partha Sharothi Mazumder – Bass guitar
- (1991–1994)
- Autumnal Moon – Guitars & Vocals. (2002–2003)
- Shishir – Bass Guitar (1992–1994)
- Habib Anwar Joy – Drums (1993–1994)
- Rezwan Sheikh– Drums (1994–1995)
- Iqbal Asif Jewel – Guitars (1996)
- Balam – Guitars
- Enam Elahi Tonty- Drums(1996–1997)
- – b
- Hossain Towhidur Rahman Rumi - Drums (1997–2000), (2009–2011), (2012–2014).
- Mehedi Hasan Rubel (2016- 2021)
- Sumon – guitars (2018–2024)
- Faizan Rashid Ahmad Buno – bass guitars (2019–2022)
- Md Imtiaz Ali Zimi– drums (2017–2022)

Touring members

- Schumann Zaman – Bass Guitar (1999– 2002)
- Bulbul –Bass Guitar (1995–1996)
- Habib Wahid – key Boards.
- Mehedi Hasan Rubel – Drums

== Discography ==
Studio albums

- "মুক্তিযুদ্ধ (Liberation War)" (1991)
- "তাজমহল (Tajmahal)" (1996)
- "জন্মভূমি (Birthplace)" (1998)
- "স্বাধীনতা (Freedom)" (2000)
- "হারান মাঝি (Haran Majhi)" (2002)

Mixed albums

- ধুন (1997)
- Stars 2 (1998)
- Hit Run Out (1998)
- একটি গোলাপ (1998)
- 6 Bands '99 (1999)
- T & T (1999)
- নেই তুমি (2000)
- দু্খিনী আমি (2000)
- বৃহস্পতি (2001)
