= Samina Chowdhury =

Bangladeshi singer (born 1966)

- সামিনা চৌধুরী
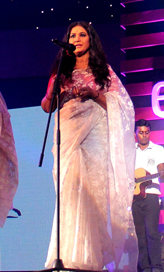
- Chowdhury in 2012
- Born: Samina Nabi Shuma; 28 August 1966 (age 59); Dinajpur, Bangladesh
- Occupations: Singer, musician
- Spouse: Izaz Khan Swapon (m. 1993)
- Children: 2
- Father: Mahmudun Nabi
- Relatives: Fahmida Nabi (sister)
- Awards: Full list
- Musical career
- Genres: Modern, classical, Rabindra Sangeet
- Instruments: Vocals, keyboard, harmonium
- Years active: 1981–present
- Website: saminachowdury.com

Samina Chowdhury (born 28 August 1966) is a Bangladeshi singer. She mostly sings modern and classical songs. Her notable songs include Jonmo Theke Jolchi Mago, Amar Buker Moddhyekhane, Amar Dui Chokhe Dui Nodi, Ekbar Jodi Keu, Kobita Porar Prohor and Phool Phote Phool Jhore.

== Early life ==
Chowdhury was born to Mahmudun Nabi (1936-1990) and Rashida Chowdhury. Her siblings are Fahmida Nabi, Tanzida Nabi, and Ridwan Nabi Pancham. As a child, she went to Agrani School and College in Dhaka. Taught by her father, she developed as a playback contemporary singer. She took part in the Notun Kuri song category and came first in this competition in 1977.

== Career ==
Chowdhury started her career as a playback singer in 1981. Her debut song was Jonmo Theke Jolchi Mago from the film Jonmo Theke Jolchi. She continued working as a singer in the audio industry. Later, she sang the song "Saat Bhai Champa Jagore" in the film "Saat Bhai Champa". Then she took a hiatus from playback singing. She concentrated on studio albums and released songs named Kobita Porar Prohor Eseche, Ekbar Jodi Keu Bhalobasto and Oi Jhinuk Phota Sagorbelay.

Chowdhury returned to playback singing through the song "Tomar Gorur Garite Ami Jabo Na", a duet with Andrew Kishore. Another rendition was "Amar Buker Moddhyekhane". Some of her repertoire are Door Deepobasini, Hou Jodi Oi Neel Akash, "Hridoye Likhechi Tomari Naam" and Amar Majhe Nei Ekhon Ami. Her non-playback career includes adhunik song and Rabindra Sangeet. Some of her modern songs are Oi Jhinuk Phota Sagorbelay, Amar Icche Kore, Kobita Porar Prohor Eseche Rater Nirjone, Somoy Jeno Kate Na, Phool Phote Phool Jhore etc. She also released a Rabindra Sangeet album in 2009. She has sung two songs in the film Niswartha Bhalobasa : "Jamunar Jol" (with S I Tutul) and "Shopno Shopno".

Chowdhury acted in radio dramas - Julius Caesar and Ei Shei. She also used to be a news anchor.

Chowdhury has performed as a playback singer for film scores. She won Bangladesh National Film Award for Best Female Playback Singer (2006), Bachsas Award for Best Female Singer (1981) and Meril Prothom Alo Award for Best Female Singer (2005). In 2007, she served as judge of "Sera Kantha" held at Channel I. She also served as the judge of Channel i 's "Khude Gun Raj", NTV's "CloseUp1", "Valobashi Bangladesh" of Maasranga Television and other programs.

== Collaborations ==
During her career, Chowdhury has collaborated with many singers of Bangladesh. She played duets with Asif Akbar, Habib Wahid, Subir Nandi, Andrew Kishore, S. D. Rubel, S.I. Tutul, Monir Khan, Bappa Mazumder, Agun etc. She has worked with music directors and lyricists including Ahmed Imtiaz Bulbul, Ali Akbar Rupu, Sheikh Sadi Khan, Alam Khan, Alauddin Ali, Khan Ataur Rahman, Shawkat Ali Emon, Kabir Bakul, S.I. Tutul, Habib Wahid and Bappa Mazumder.

== Discography ==
=== Studio albums ===
She has sung in 15 studio albums

Year	Album title	Co-artist(s)	Music director(s)	Lyricist(s)	Banner	Notes
	Phool Phote Phool Jhore			Shahid Mahmud Jangi		first album
1987	Shoishob-er Dinguli	-			Sargam	first solo album
	Saat Bhai Chompa					
	Pagol Mon					
	Durpori					
	Kobita Porar Prohor					
	Raater Kobita					
	Ei Bujhi Tumi Ele					
	Dui Choke Dui Nodi					
1999	Amay Dekona	-	Lucky Akhand			solo album
2013	Cholo Bachi	Raghab Chattopadhyay	Naquib Khan, Pilu Khan, Indrajit Dey and Tamal Chakraborty	Zulfiqer Russell	Laser Vision	
2014	Pushpo Brishti	Bappa Mazumder	Md Abdul Bari	Md Abdul Bari		released on Valentine's Day 2014
2014	Sokhi	-	Bappa Mazumder and Ibrar Tipu			based on Rabindra and Nazrul Songs
2015	Ekta Bondhu Chai	Raghab Chattopadhyay	Indrajit Dey and Tamal Chakraborty	Zulfiqer Russell	Laser Vision	

=== Notable songs ===
- "Somoy Jeno Kate Na" written by renowned lyricist Shahid Mahmud Jangi
- "Phool Phote Phool Jhore" written by renowned lyricist Shahid Mahmud Jangi
- Jonmo Theke Jolchi Mago
- Amar Duichokhe
- Amar Buker Moddhyekhane
- Phool Phote Phool Jhore
- Ekbar Jodi Keu
- Amar Majhe Nei
- Kobita Porar Prohor
- Ami Anutapta
- Ekbar Jodi Keu
- Bondhu Amar

== Film songs ==
Year	Movie	Song	Music director	Songwriter(s)	Co-Artist
1981	Jonmo Theke Jolchi	"Ekbar Jodi Bhalobashto" (female)	Alauddin Ali	Amjad Hossain	solo
1983	Puroskar	"Aaj Kono Kaj Nei"	Satya Saha		Abdul Jabbar
1984	Noyoner Alo	"Amar Buker Modhyekhane"	Ahmed Imtiaz Bulbul	Ahmed Imtiaz Bulbul	Andrew Kishore
1984	Noyoner Alo	"Ami Tomar Duti Chokhe"	Ahmed Imtiaz Bulbul	Ahmed Imtiaz Bulbul	solo
1986	Akhi Milan	"Shonre Bubu Shon"	Ahmed Imtiaz Bulbul	Ahmed Imtiaz Bulbul	Sabina Yasmin
1986	Akhi Milan	"Tomar Gorur Garite"	Ahmed Imtiaz Bulbul	Ahmed Imtiaz Bulbul	Andrew Kishore
1989	Sakkhi Proman	"Keu Kande Keu Hase" (version 2)	Ahmed Imtiaz Bulbul		Khalid Hasan Milu
1990	Shimul Parul	"Ore Kolshi Jare Bhaisha"	Anwar Jahan Nantu	Alamgir Kabir	Andrew Kishore
1992	Anjali	"Loke Bole Paglami"	Alauddin Ali	Moniruzzaman Monir	Maqsudul Haque
1993	Protishruti	"Kichhu Shopno Kichhu Asha"	Tansen Khan	Moniruzzaman Monir, Liakat Ali Biswas	solo
1994	Tumi Amar	"Amar Jonno Tomar Jonno"	Abu Taher	Moniruzzaman Monir	Agun
1995	Hridoy Amar	"Tomake Ami Rakhbo Dhore"	Azad Mintu	Liakat Ali Biswas	Agun
1998	Ei Mon Tomake Dilam	"Bhalobeshe Ontore" (sad)	Alauddin Ali	Gazi Mazharul Anwar	Khalid Hasan Milu
1999	Jobabdihi	"Beche Achi Jemon Sotto'	Abu Taher		Andrew Kishore
1999	Khobor Ache	"Eito Dujon Sadhona"	Alauddin Ali	Aziz Ahmed Babul	Khalid Hasan Milu
1999	Khobor Ache	"Ei Sundor Prithivite Esechi"	Alauddin Ali	Aziz Ahmed Babul	S D Rubel
1999	Tomar Jonno Pagol	"Ekbar Jonmo Nile Ami"	Emon Saha	Gazi Mazharul Anwar, Latiful Alam Shibli	Monir Khan
2000	Mone Pore Tomake	"De De Dena Re"	Shawkat Ali Emon	Kabir Bakul	Kumar Biswajit
2001	E Badhon Jabena Chhire	"Keno Jhor Uthechhe"	Abu Taher	Munshi Wadud	Andrew Kishore
2002	Bou Hobo	"Ei Haate Mehedi Sajabo"	Emon Saha	Gazi Mazharul Anwar, Moniruzzaman Monir, Kabir Bakul, Sachin Kumar Nag	chorus
2002	Bou Hobo	"Debo Tomay, Ei Deho Mon"	Emon Saha	Gazi Mazharul Anwar, Moniruzzaman Monir, Kabir Bakul, Sachin Kumar Nag	Khalid Hasan Milu
2002	Bou Hobo	"Ke Jeno Chupichupi Amar Mone"	Emon Saha	Gazi Mazharul Anwar, Moniruzzaman Monir, Kabir Bakul, Sachin Kumar Nag	Tapan Chowdhury
2002	Bou Hobo	"Ke Jeno Chupichupi" (reprise)	Emon Saha	Gazi Mazharul Anwar, Moniruzzaman Monir, Kabir Bakul, Sachin Kumar Nag	Tapan Chowdhury
2002	Kokhono Megh Kokhono Brishti	"Kokiler Dak Shuno"	Alauddin Ali	N/A	solo
2002	Kokhono Megh Kokhono Brishti	"Kokhono Megh Kokhono Brishti"	Alauddin Ali	N/A	Andrew Kishore
2002	Lal Doriya	"Kototuku Dukkho Pele"	Alauddin Ali	Gazi Mazharul Anwar	Monir Khan
2002	Shoshurbari Zindabad	"Tomar Amar Biyer Kotha"	Emon Saha		Andrew Kishore
2002	Sobar Upore Prem	"Bhalobashe Keno Ami"	Azad Mintu	Mohammad Rafiquzzaman	solo
2003	Bou Shashurir Juddho	"Ami Bou Hote Chai"	Anwar Parvez	Moniruzzaman Monir	solo
2003	Sotter Bijoy	"Rup Dekhe Bolbo Ki"	Emon Saha	Kabir Bakul	Andrew Kishore
2003	Sotter Bijoy	"Nisshash Amar Bondho Hoye Jay"	Emon Saha	Kabir Bakul	Andrew Kishore
2004	Baap Betar Lorai	"Kokhono Ki Cheyechile"	Shawkat Ali Emon	Kabir Bakul	Asif Akbar
2004	Khairun Sundori	"Moner Manush Pailam Nare"	Emon Saha	Wadud Rongila"	Andrew Kishore
2005	Badha	"Jibone Prothom Jare Legechhe Bhalo"	Ahmed Imtiaz Bulbul		Monir Khan
2005	Bolo Na Bhalobashi	"Bangali Ekti Meye"	Ahmed Imtiaz Bulbul		Andrew Kishore
2005	Char Sotiner Ghor	"Jalaiya Poraiya Dimu Char Shotiner Ghor"	Emon Saha	Gazi Mazharul Anwar	Runa Laila, Dithi Anwar and Dinat Jahan Munni
2005	Khude Joddha	"E Jibon Chole Tar Apon Kheyale"	Ali Akram Shuvo		Polash
2005	Tak Jhal Mishti	"Tumi Bolle Tule Debo"	Emon Saha	Kabir Bakul	Kumar Biswajit
2006	Bangla	"Kotharo Bhitore Kotha Thake"	Golam Mustafa Shimul	Milton Khondokar	solo
2006	Hridoyer Kotha	"Tomar Karone Ami"	Alauddin Ali	N/A	Andrew Kishore
2006	Na Bolona	"Picnic Eri Dhum"	Ahmed Imtiaz Bulbul	Gazi Mazharul Anwar	Shakila Zafar
2006	Na Bolona	"Chokh Sorano Joto Sohoj"	Ahmed Imtiaz Bulbul	Gazi Mazharul Anwar	Shakila Zafar, Andrew Kishore
2006	Na Bolona	"Gane Gane Kotha Holo"	Ahmed Imtiaz Bulbul	Gazi Mazharul Anwar	Andrew Kishore
2006	Na Bolona	"Nodi Chay Cholte"	Ahmed Imtiaz Bulbul	Gazi Mazharul Anwar	solo
2006	Noy Number Bipod Sanket	N/A	Humayun Ahmed	N/A	solo
2006	Rani Kuthir Baki Itihash	"Shopno Tumi Shotti Tumi"	S I Tutul	Kabir Bakul	Asif Akbar
2006	Rani Kuthir Baki Itihash	"Amar Majhe Nei Ekhon Ami"	S I Tutul	Kabir Bakul	Asif Akbar
2006	Sathi Tumi Kar?	"Ore Amar Bhondo Jyotishi"	Ahmed Imtiaz Bulbul	Ahmed Imtiaz Bulbul	Monir Khan
2006	Tokair Hate Ostro Keno	"Tomakei Pete Chai"	Ahmed Imtiaz Bulbul		Monir Khan
2007	Amar Praner Swami	"Tumi Amar Praner Swami"	Shawkat Ali Emon	Kabir Bakul	Kumar Biswajit
2007	Daruchini Dwip	"Door Dweepo Bashini"	S.I. Tutul, Kazi Nazrul Islam	Kazi Nazrul Islam	Fahmida Nabi
2007	Ami Bachte Chai	"Tumi Dushtu Chokhe Takao Jokhon"	Emon Saha	N/A	Komol
2007	Machine Man	"Megher Palki Ta Jay Akashe Bheshe"	Ali Akram Shuvo	Kabir Bakul	solo
2007	Shotru Shotru Khela	"Antorer Ei Thikanay"	Emon Saha	Kabir Bakul	Andrew Kishore
2007	Ma Amar Swargo	"Bondho Ekta Kamra"	Ahmed Imtiaz Bulbul		Komol
2007	Samir Songsar	"Keno Emon Bolo Hoy"	Ali Akram Shuvo	Kabir Bakul	S I Tutul
2007	Tumi Acho Hridoye	"Hou Jodi Oi Nil Akash" (female)	S I Tutul	Kabir Bakul	solo
2007	Tumi Acho Hridoye	"Hou Jodi Oi Nil Akash" (duet)	S I Tutul	Kabir Bakul	S I Tutul
2007	Rokto Pipasa	"Tomari Naam Likhechi Hridiye"	S I Tutul	Kabir Bakul	S I Tutul
2007	Saajghor	"Amar Deher Moddhe Mon"	Emon Saha	Munshi Wadud, Shah Alam Sarkar	Bappa Mazumdar
2007	Tomakei Khujchi	"Tomar Namer Phool"	Ali Akram Shuvo	Kabir Bakul	S I Tutul
2008	Abujh Shishu	"Moner Tuli Diye"	Ahmed Imtiaz Bulbul	Ahmed Imtiaz Bulbul	Ahmed Imtiaz Bulbul
2008	Abujh Shishu	"Ghum Nei Chokhe"	Ahmed Imtiaz Bulbul	Ahmed Imtiaz Bulbul	Ahmed Imtiaz Bulbul
2008	Biyer Prostab	"Nodi Bole Koire"	Ahmed Imtiaz Bulbul	Ahmed Imtiaz Bulbul	solo
2008	Akash Chhoa Bhalobasa	"Hridoye Likhechi Tomari Naam"	S.I. Tutul	N/A	S I Tutul
2008	Amar Jaan Amar Pran	"Onek Shopno Niye"	Shawkat Ali Emon, Ali Akram Shuvo	N/A	Andrew Kishore
2008	Sontan Amar Ohongkar	"Aula Premer Batash"	Ahmed Imtiaz Bulbul	Ahmed Imtiaz Bulbul	S I Tutul
2008	Tomake Bou Banabo	"Moroner Kachakachi"	Shawkat Ali Emon	N/A	S I Tutul
2008	Tomake Bou Banabo	"Tomar Chokhe Duchokh Rekhe"	Shawkat Ali Emon	N/A	S I Tutul
2008	Chondrogrohon	"Kon Shohore Jabi"	N/A	N/A	solo
2008	Choto Bon	"Bhalobashi Bhalobashi Tomake"	Imtiaz Bulbul	/A	Asif Akbar
2008	Choto Bon	"Kono Jannat Theke Prem"	Imtiaz Bulbul	/A	Monir Khan
2008	Choto Bon	"Poraner Bandhob Re"	Imtiaz Bulbul	/A	Runa Laila
2009	Bolona Kobul	"Amaro Jibone Tumi"	Shawkat Ali Emon	N/A	Kumar Biswajit
2009	Swami Strir Wada	"Nodir Dukkho Hoy"	Kumar Biswajit		solo
2009	Tumi Amar Swami	"Mone Mone Prem"	Ibrar Tipu	Kabir Bakul	Ibrar Tipu
2010	Bap Boro Na Shoshur Boro	N/A	N/A	N/A	solo
2010	Mayer Cokh	"Manush Manusher Jonno"	Alam Khan	Kabir Bakul	Andrew Kishore
2010	Top Hero	"Bhalobashar Prithibi Ta"	Emon Saha	Kabir Bakul	Andrew Kishore
2010	Takar Ceye Prem Boro	"Astei Hobe Aaj Tomake"	Shawkat Ali Emon	Kabir Bakul	S I Tutul
2010	Khoj- The Search	"Angtir Opekkhay"	Emon Saha		solo
2011	Anko	"Tomake Chai"	Shawkat Ali Emon	Kabir Bakul	S. I. Tutul
2011	Kusum Kusum Prem	"Bhalobasha Dao"	Emon Saha	N/A	Subir Nandi
2012	Anyo Rokom Bhalobasha	"Bhalobashar Shobtuku Rong"	Shafiq Tuhin		Shafiq Tuhin
2012	The Speed	"Gungun Pakhira Akashe"	N/A	N/A	Andrew Kishore
2012	Jiddi Bou	"Ekta Chor Esechilo"	Ahmed Imtiaz Bulbul		Monir Khan
2013	Nishwartha Bhalobasa	"Jomunar Jol"	Emon Saha		S I Tutul
2013	Nishwartha Bhalobasa	"Shopno Shopno"	Emon Saha		solo
2013	Tobuo Bhalobashi	"Biyar O Dhol"	Shawkat Ali Emon	N/A	Kona, Rajib, Kumar Biswajit
2014	Simarekha	N/A		solo	
2015	Mohua Sundori	"O Bindhure"			S I Tutul
2015	The Story Of Samara	"Aaj Bhalobashay Bhashbo Dujon"	Alauddin Ali	N/A	S I Tutul
2016	Mon Janena Moner Thikana	"Moner Thikana"	N/A	N/A	N/A
2017	Dulabhai Zindabad	"Dulabhai Zindabad"	Emon Saha	Kabir Bakul	Monir Khan
2017	I Love You Priya	"Love You Priya"			Andrew Kishore
2017	Mar Chokka	"Boro Beshi Dekhte Icchha Kore"	Ali Akram Shuvo		Belal Khan
2017	Swatta	"Ami Tore Chai"	Bappa Mazumder	Hashibur Reza Kollol	Bappa Mazumder
2020	Punch	"Ekhono Olosh Raat Baki"	Naquib Khan	Shahid Mahmud Jongi	solo
N/A	Ami Ekai Eksho	"Bhalobashte Bhashte"	Ali Akram Shuvo		Andrew Kishore

=== Television songs ===
Year	Show	Song	Composer(s)	Songwriter(s)	Co-singer(s)
1998	Meril Prothom Alo Awards	"Medley Song"	various	various	Kanak Chapa and Shakila Zafar

== Reality show judge ==
In the year 2007, Samina Chowdhury served as judge of "Sera Kantha" held at Channel I. She also served as the judge of Channel i 's "Khude Gun Raj", NTV's "CloseUp1", "Valobashi Bangladesh" of Maasranga Television.

== Television appearance ==
- Drama - Midnight Black Coffee aired on NTV

== Radio program ==
Samina Chowdhury took part in "Julius Caesar" and "Ei shei" radio drama. She also worked as a news presenter.

== Awards ==
National Film Awards

- Best Female Playback Singer - 2006

Bachsas Awards

- Best Female Singer - 1981

Meril Prothom Alo Awards

Year	Song name	Categories	Result
2001	Sat Vai Chompa	Best Female Singer	Nominated
2005	Ei Bujhi Tumi Ele	Best Female Singer	Won
2006	Amar Majhe Nei	Best Female Singer	Won
