= Pilu Khan =

Pilu Khan পিলু খান
- Born: Shahbaz Khan Pilu; 15 December 1961 (age 64); Chittagong, Bangladesh
- Occupations: Singer, music composer, drummer and director
- Spouse: Zareen Kabir Durdana

Shahbaz Khan Pilu (born 15 December 1960), commonly known as Pilu Khan, is a Bangladeshi singer, music composer, drummer and director. He is a current member of the Bangladeshi band Renaissance and is a former member of the rock band Souls.

== Career ==
Khan joined Souls in 1974. After working in Souls for ten years, he joined Renaissance in 1985, formed by his older brother Naquib Khan. Three years later, in 1988, the band's debut album, Renaissance, was released. The second album was released in 1993 titled Tritio Bishsho, the third in 1998 titled Ekattorer Renaissance and the fourth album titled Ekush Shotoker Renaissance in 2004. Khan released his first solo album Tomar Bhalo Acho To in 2019.

== Personal life ==
Khan has two brothers named Naquib Khan and Jalaluddin Khan Zilu. He is married to Zareen Kabir Durdana and has a son and a daughter. His son, Dameer, is a musician.
