= Renaissance (Bangladeshi band) =

Renaissance রেনেসাঁ
- Origin: Dhaka, Bangladesh
- Genres: Reggae, jazz, soft rock
- Years active: 1985–present
- Label: Soundtech
- Members: Naquib Khan; Reza Rahman; Pilu Khan; Imran Rahman; Kazi Hablu; Kaartik
- Past members: Feisal Siddiqi Bogey; Ehsanul Islam Motto; Mamun

Renaissance is a Bangladeshi band which was formed in 1985 in Dhaka .

== History ==
Naquib Khan, Feisal Siddiqi Bogey, Pilu Khan, Motto, Mamoon formed Renaissance in 1985. The band's first album was released in 1988. Naquib Khan and Pilu Khan sang a song titled 'Tomar Koshter Chikare Jonno Nilam Ami' in the film To Be Continued which is directed by Iftekhar Ahmed Fahmi. In 2009, Renaissance took part in a studio concert organised by ABC Radio's Eid Anondo.

== Discography ==
- Renaissance (1988)
- Tritio Bishsho (1993)
- Ekattorer Renaissance (1998)
- Ekush Shotoker Renaissance (2004)

== Members ==
Current members

- Naquib Khan – vocals, keyboard, composer(1985–present)
- Pilu Khan – vocals, drums, composer (1985–present)
- Reza Rahman – lead guitar
- Kazi Hablu – percussion (?–present)
- Kaartik – bass
- Imran Rahman – Acoustic guitar, vocal

Past members

- Faisal Siddiqui Bogey - vocal, guitar (1985-?)
- Ehsanul Islam Motto - Bass (1985-?)
- Mamun - (1985-?)
- Omar Khaled Rumi– lead guitarVocal, acoustic guitar
