= Souls (band) =

Bangladeshi rock band

Souls সোল্‌স
- Also known as: Shurela (1972–1973)
- Origin: Chittagong, Bangladesh
- Genres: Pop rock; blues rock
- Years active: 1972–present
- Labels: Sargam; Soundtek; Baishak; G-Series
- Members: Partha Barua; Meer Shahriar Hossain Masum; Maruf Hasan Talukder Real; Avijit Sengupta
- Past members: Ahasanur Rahman Ashiq; Naseem Ali Khan; Naquib Khan; Pilu Khan; Ayub Bachchu; Tapan Chowdhury; Sazedul Alam; Ahmed Nawaz; Subrata Barua Ronny; Lutfur Kabir Azad; Pantha Kanai; Iftikher Uddin Sohel; Naimul Hasan Tanim; Zakir Hasan Rana
- Website: soulsbd.com

Souls is a Bangladeshi rock band formed in Chittagong in 1972.

== History ==
In 1972, the band was formed under the name Shurela.

In 1973, the band changed the name to Souls.

In 1980, Souls released their first album Super Souls.

In 1982, Souls released their second album Colleger Corridore.

In 1986, Souls released their third album Manush Matir Kacha Kachi.

In 1988, Souls released their fourth album East and West.

In 1993, Souls released their fifth album E Emon Porichoy.

In 1995, Souls released their sixth album Aj Din Katuk Gane.

In 1997, Souls released their seventh album Oshomoyer Gaan.

In 2000, Souls released their eighth album Mukhorito Jibon.

In 2003, Souls released their ninth album Tarar Uthone.

In 2004, Souls released their tenth album To-Let.

In 2006, Souls released their eleventh album Jhut Jhamela.

In 2011, Souls released their twelfth album Jam.

== Discography ==
- Super Souls (1980)
- Colleger Corridore (1982)
- Manush Matir Kachakachi (1987)
- East & West (1988)
- E Emon Porichoy (1993)
- Aj Din Katuk Gane (1995)
- Oshomoyer Gaan (1997)
- Mukhorito Jibon (2000)
- Tarar Uthone (2003)
- To – Let (2004)
- Jhut Jhamela (2006)
- Jam (2011)

== Members ==
=== Present members ===
- Partha Barua – vocals, lead guitar (1989–present)
- Meer Shahriar Hossain Masum – keyboards (2003–present)
- Maruf Hasan Talukder Real – bass guitar (2012–present)
- Avijit Sengupta – drums (2025–present)

=== Past members ===
- Ahasanur Rahman Ashiq – drums (2000–2025)
- Naseem Ali Khan – vocals (1980–2024)
- Naquib Khan – vocals, keyboards (1974–1984)
- Pilu Khan – drums (1974–1984)
- Ayub Bachchu – vocals, lead guitar (1980–1990)
- Tapan Chowdhury – vocals (1973–1993)
- Sazedul Alam – lead guitar (1972–1980)
- Ahmed Nawaz – keyboards (1972–1995)
- Subrata Barua Ronny – drums (1972–1995)
- Lutfur Kabir Azad – keyboards (1991–2004)
- Pantha Kanai – drums (1995–2000)
- Iftikher Uddin Sohel – lead guitar (1995–2004)
- Naimul Hasan Tanim – bass guitar (1993–2006)
- Zakir Hasan Rana – bass guitar (2006–2012)
