= Syed Hasanur Rahman =

Syed Hasanur Rahman সৈয়দ হাসানুর রহমান
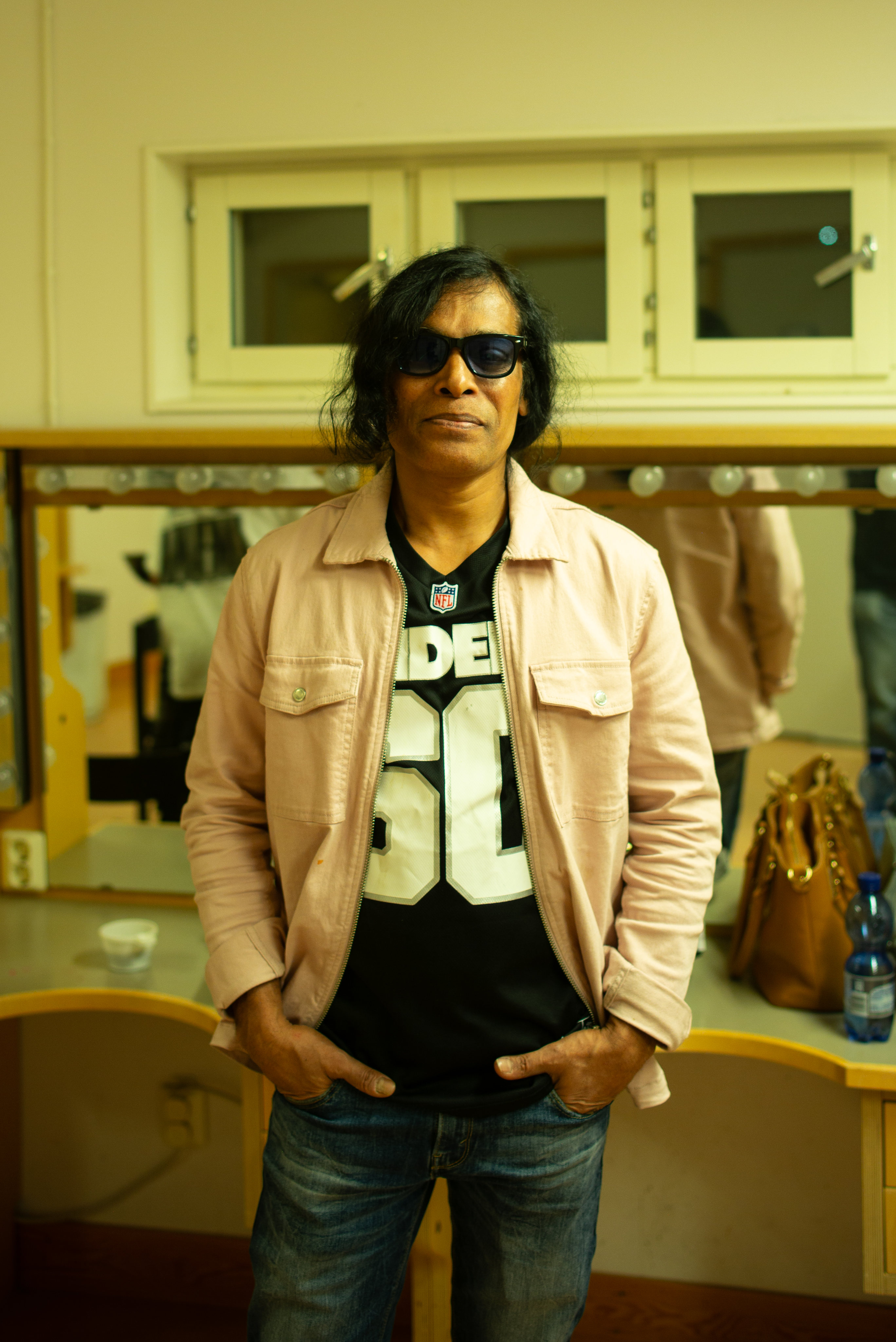
- Hasan in 2023

Background information
- Born: Syed Hasanur Rahman; 19 April
- Occupations: Singer, songwriter
- Instrument: Vocals
- Years active: 1993–present
- Member of: Ark

Syed Hasanur Rahman (born 19 April), commonly known as Hasan, is a Bangladeshi singer-songwriter, and lead vocalist of the Bangladeshi popular rock band Ark. Possessing a distinctive and powerful wide-ranging high-pitched voice, Hasan has been named one of the greatest vocalists of band music history. He joined the band in 1993 as a vocalist. After six years with the band, Hasan left Ark and formed the new band Swadhinata in 2002. He rejoined Ark in late 2010.

Hasan estimated in 2017 that he had written more than 200 songs. He released one solo album, Tal.

== Early life ==
From an early age, Hasan was skilled in performing hamd, naat and poetry recitation. He also had an interest in writing poetry. His elder sister, Husna Afroz, acted in radio and television dramas. While studying in classes five and six, he began writing and composing songs by himself.

Around 1989–1990, he enrolled in a certificate course in folk music at Bulbul Lalitakala Academy.

== Music career ==
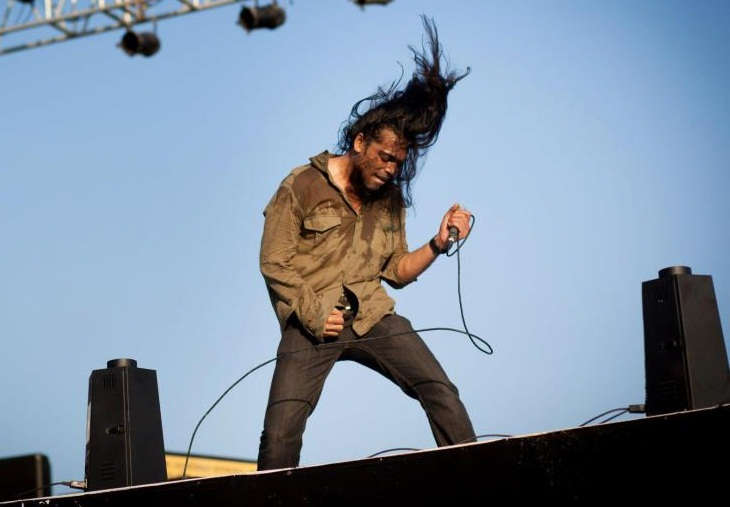
Hasan live at a concert

Hasan's first band was Ark. He was associated with Ark for about nine years. Later, he left the band and formed another band named Shadhinota.

In 1996, Hasan gained major popularity through Ark's album Tajmahal. His rise to fame mainly started with this album. The songs he performed on the album were written and composed by himself. About two years later, in 1998, Ark released the album Jonmobhumi, which also became a superhit.

Hasan's last album with Ark was Shadhinota. He later released a solo album titled Tal. After staying in the United States for about four months, he returned to Bangladesh and in 2002, formed a new band named Shadhinota with the same lineup after changing the name of Ar'. The first album released under the band was Karbala.

Hasan's only solo album is Tal, while his other albums are mixed compilations. He has recorded more than 200 songs.

== Politics ==
Hasan served as a joint convener of Jatiotabadi Samajik Sangskritik Sangstha (JASAS), a cultural wing affiliated with the Bangladesh Nationalist Party (BNP).

== Personal life ==
Hasan married in August 2000. His wife, Farhana Majid, was born in Comilla. They have one son named Hasin.
