= Tapan Chowdhury (singer) =

Bangladeshi singer-songwriter, musician

Tapan Chowdhury তপন চৌধুরী
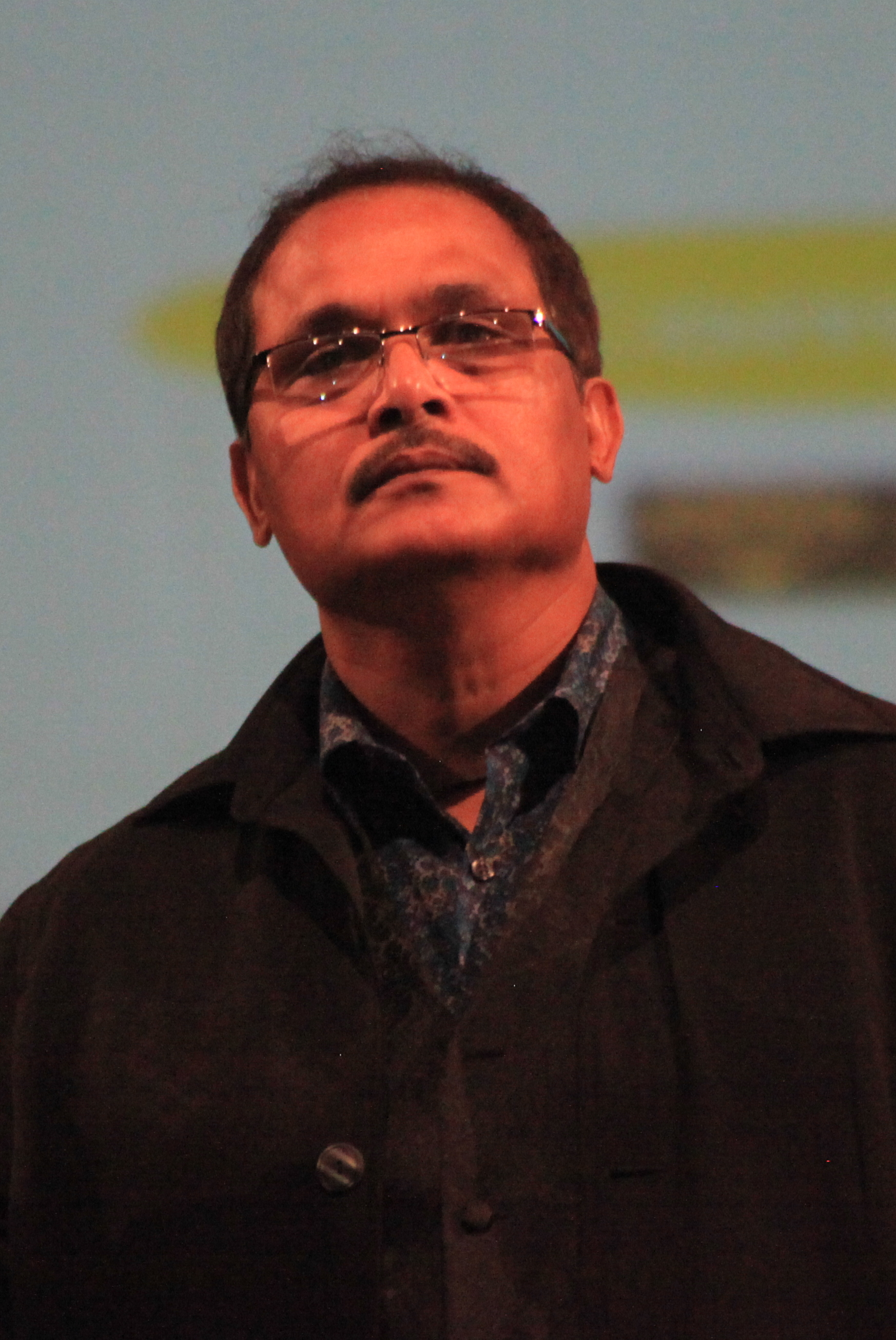
- Chowdhury in 2015

Background information
- Born: 7 January; Chittagong, Bangladesh
- Genres: Modern (Adhunink); Pop; Rock; Rabindra Sangeet; Lalon Geeti; Folk
- Occupations: Singer; musician; songwriter
- Instruments: Vocals, guitar, harmonium
- Years active: 1973–present
- Formerly of: Souls

Tapan Chowdhury (born 7 January) is a Bangladeshi singer. He is a former member of the musical group Souls and is known for his modern (Adhunik) songs. He won Best Male Singer in 1st Meril-Prothom Alo Awards in 1998.

== Career ==
Chowdhury was trained by Ustad Priyadaranjan Sen, Ustad Mihirlala and Pandit Sanjit Dey. He started his career with Souls towards the end of 1973 and worked for the band for 20 years. He was one of the biggest contributor to Souls, being the main vocalist of the first five albums. Later, he started to work as a solo singer. He performed as a playback singer for more than 300 films.

== Personal life ==
Chowdhury now resides in Montreal, Quebec, Canada with his wife Soma and son Satyam.
