= Partha Barua =

Bangladeshi Musician and actor

- পার্থ বড়ুয়া
- Barua in 2017
- Born: Chittagong, Bangladesh
- Spouse: Ranjana Barua
- Children: 1
- Musical career
- Genres: Pop; rock; Singer; musician; composer; actor
- Instruments: Guitar; keyboard; vocals
- Years active: 1989–present
- Labels: CD Choice, G-Series; Soundtek; Sargam
- Member of: Souls
- Website: soulsbd.com

Partha Barua (born 3 May) is a Bangladeshi singer, musician, composer and actor. He is a member of the rock band Souls.

== Early life ==
Barua was born and raised in Chittagong, Bangladesh, to father Bimal Kanti Barua and mother Abha Barua. His mother was a teacher at Bagmoniram S.K City Corporation School. Partha was introduced to music at a very early age. He had a music teacher at home and also used to perform regularly at school programmes. He attended Arjo Sangeet, Chittagong and trained under Ekushey Padak recipient Ustaad Nirad Baran Barua. He completed his SSC from St Placid's School & College, HSC from Govt. Hazi Muhammad Mohsin College, Chattogram and graduation from University of Chittagong.

== Career ==
=== Music ===
While studying at Chittagong University, Barua sang for Sangskritik Chattro Sangha. Later, he became a member of a local band, "Message" and began to learn playing guitar from the legendary musician Ayub Bachchu and keyboard. Barua started his singing career with Souls in 1989.

Barua is a celebrated Bangladeshi composer, musician, and singer, widely recognized for his influence on the country’s rock and contemporary music scene. As a key member of the legendary rock band Souls, he played a crucial role in shaping Bangladeshi rock music. His compositions and performances seamlessly blend rock with modern and traditional Bengali elements, creating a distinctive sound.

Beyond his work with Souls, Partha Barua has composed and performed for films, television dramas, and solo projects. His first solo album Mukhosh released in 2020 further showcased his versatility. His words has contributed to Bangladesh's contemporary music scene.

=== Acting ===
Barua’s acting career has been diverse and notable in Bangladesh's entertainment industry. He made his film debut in 2016 with the critically acclaimed film Aynabaji, where he portrayed the character of Saber Hossain. This film helped establish him as a talented actor in the film industry, showcasing his range and ability to dive into complex roles.

In addition to his work in films, Barua has appeared in various television dramas. One of his prominent roles was in the series FnF (Friends n Family), which aired in 2010. He portrayed the character of Mesbah, adding depth to the drama with his performance. He later appeared in Taqdeer (2020), a crime thriller series where he took on the role of Hitman, further demonstrating his versatility in different genres. He also starred in the drama Ladies & Gentlemen (2021), playing the role of Imtiyaz, which was well received by audiences.

Barua featured in the 2023 film Made in Chittagong, where he played the lead role of Solaiman. This project further solidified his status as a significant figure in Bangladeshi cinema, and his ability to carry a leading role with gravitas was widely appreciated. Through his continued work in both television and film, Partha Barua remains a key figure in the entertainment industry in Bangladesh.

== Discography ==
=== Band ===
==== Souls ====
- E Emon Porichoy (1993)
- Aj Din Katuk Gane (1995)
- Oshomoyer Gaan (1997)
- Mukhorito Jibon (2000)
- Tarar Uthone (2003)
- To-Let (2004)
- Jhut Jhamela (2006)
- Jam (2011)

=== Solo ===
- Mukhosh (2020)

== Filmography ==
=== Film ===
Year	Title	Role
2016	Aynabaji	Saber Hossain
2022	Made in Chittagong	Solaiman

=== Web series ===
Year	Title	Role
2020	Taqdeer	Hitman
2021	Ladies & Gentleman	Imtiyaz, Police Officer
