= Feedback (band) =

Bangladeshi rock band

Feedback ফিডব্যাক
- Origin: Dhaka, Bangladesh
- Genres: Pop rock, blues rock, jazz
- Years active: 1976–present
- Labels: G-Series, Sargam Records, Soundtek
- Members: Foad Nasser Babu; Labu Rahman; Enam Elahi Tonty; Raihan Al Hasan; Mohammad Danesh; Shahnur Rahman Lumin; Ariful Islam
- Past members: Maqsoodul Haque; Pearoo Khan; Zakiur Rahman; Omar Khaled Rumi; Musa Rahman; Dastagir Haque; Sandra Hoff; Shahidul Hasan; AZ Khan Rommel Omar; Selim Haider; Hafeezur Rahman; Murad Rahman; Sutton Munshi

Feedback is a Bangladeshi rock band, formed on 4 October 1976 in Dhaka by keyboardist Foad Nasser Babu. Multiple lineup changes have taken place since 1976. They have released more than seven studio albums and have also appeared in some compilations.

== History ==
Their first appearance was in The Hotel Inter-continental, Dhaka, on 11 October 1976. Their first recorded song was "Aye Din Chiro Din Robey" in 1980. After Labu Rahman joined the band in 1986, they started concerts out of the hotels. They released their first album Feedback and then Sragam Acoustics. Feedback performed at Shilpakala Academy on 25 September 1989, at Dhaka University on 16 December 1990, at Nicco Park, Kolkata on 26 January 1992, at Jadavpur University on 12 July 1994.

In 1995, they were awarded best band from RTV for their song Jai Jai Din. Their most popular song is "Melai Jaire", and some other popular songs are "Aye Din Chirodin Robey", "Ak Jhak Projapoti", "Jhau Bonay", "Udashi", "Moushumi 1 & 2", "Kemon Korey Hai", "Janala", "Majhi", "Bidrohi", "Geetikobita 1 & 2", and "Abar Mela".

== Discography ==
Year	Album	
1985	Feedback: Volume 1	Track list: 1. Ek Jhak Projapoti; 2. Ke Jeno Dake; 3. Din Jay; 4. Ei Din Chorodin; 5. Dekh Moyuri; 6. Kobi Bolechilo; 7. Nodi Baye Jay; 8. Shohor Theke Dure; 9. Jhao Bone; 10. Love Story; 11. Emon Ekdin Hate; 12. Sipsha Nodi; 13. Oi Dur Theke Dure
1987	উল্লাস (Cheers)	Track list: 1. Amar Nutun Akashe; 2. Chithi (Letter); 3. Din Jay Din; 4. Ei Din Chirodin; 5. Janala; 6. Jhau Bone; 7. Chokh (Based on Time by Culture Club); 8. Kemon Kore Hay; 9. Majhi (Boatman); 10. Mohashunno; 11. Moushumi-1
1990	মেলা (Carnival)	Track list: 1. Chotto Pakhi; 2. Feere Esho; 3. Godhuli; 4. Jibon Jaala; 5. Jonmechi Ei Juge; 6. Mela (Melaye Jaire); 7. Mon Bujhiya; 8. Moushumi 2; 9. Moyuri Akash; 10. Neel Noksha; 11. Paalki; 12. Shodesh
1992	জোয়ার (High-Tide)	Track list: 1. Mela; 2. Ei Din Chirodin; 3. Mousumi [Part 1]; 4. Oi Dur Theke Dure; 5. Majhi 91; 6. Chithi; 7. Mousumi [Part 2]; 8. Majhi; 9. Din Jay Din Chole Jay; 10. Jeebon Jala
1994	বংগাব্দ ১৪০০ (Bengali Year 1400)	Track list: 1. Aapon Deshe Cholo; 2. Aasha; 3. Bidrohi; 4. Dhonnobad Valobasa; 5. Mama; 6. Mone Pore Tomay; 7. Palki-2; 8. Samajik Koshtho Kathinno; 9. Sukhi Manusher Vire; 10. Telephone Fish Fish; 11. Uchcha Padastha; 12. Veeru Mon
1996	বাউলিয়ানা (Bauliana)	Track list: 1. Kori Mana; 2. Dibar Kichu Nai; 3. Lokeshan; 4. Gurur Vab; 5. Kehoi Kore Bechakena; 6. Dhuar Dana; 7. Pran Kande; 8. Jonomdukhi; 9. Haoa Adame; 10. Shamkalia
1997	দেহঘড়ি (Body clock)	Track list: 1. Dehoghori; (This is a single track album, first time in Bangladesh any band gathered the courage to make such thing. The song "Dehoghori" was played twice in the two side of the cassette.)
1999	আনন্দ (Joy)	Track list: 1. Anondo 2. Janina 3. Mon Aj Amar 4. Shoto Byastotai 5. Aumor 6. Chokher Patai Vashey 7. Jibon Ta Jeno Golpo 8. Kemon Achhi 9. Dui Doshok; 10. Putuler Gaan
2002	০২ (02)	Track list: 1. Abar Melay; 2. Bondhur Khoje; 3. Ei Mon Manena; 4. Emoni Rate; 5. Kada Mati; 6. Kar Isharay; 7. Ke Tumi; 8. Mon Munia; 9. Prem; 10. Shopno; 11. Tumi Nai

=== Mixed albums ===
- Rongomela Vol.1
- Together
- Kiron
- Adda
- 6 Band Mixed '99
- Aloron
- Millennium

== Members ==
=== Present ===
- Foad Nasser Babu – (keyboards) (1976–present)
- Labu Rahman – (guitars & vocals) (1986–present)
- Enam Elahi Tonty (drums & percussion) (1997–present)
- Shahnur Rahman Lumin – (lead vocals) (2003–present)
- Raihan Al Hasan (vocals & acoustic guitar)
- Mohammed Danesh (bass guitar) (2016–present)
- Sujan Arif (vocals)

=== Past ===
- Maqsoodul Haque – (vocals) (1978–1996)
- Pearo Khan – (drums)
- Selim Haider – (vocals)
- Murad Rahman – (bass)
- Ershad Moinuddin Popsy
- Sekender Ahmed Khoka
- Zakiur Rahman
- Sanu Richter
- Kingsley Richter
- Sandra Hoff
- Omar Khaled Rumi
- Musa Rahman
- Dastagir Haque
- A Z Khan Rommel
- Shahriyar Sultan Piyash
- Reshad Mahmood
- Atiquzzaman Khan Bulbul

=== First lineup ===
- Foad Nasser Babu - keyboards
- Ershad Moinuddin Popsy - drums
- Murad Rahman - bass
- Kingsley Richter - rhythm guitar & vocals
- Sanu Richter - vocals
- Salim Haider - lead guitar
- Sandra Hoff - vocals
- Hafizur Rahman - manager
