= Integration (festival) =

Techno-cultural festival in India

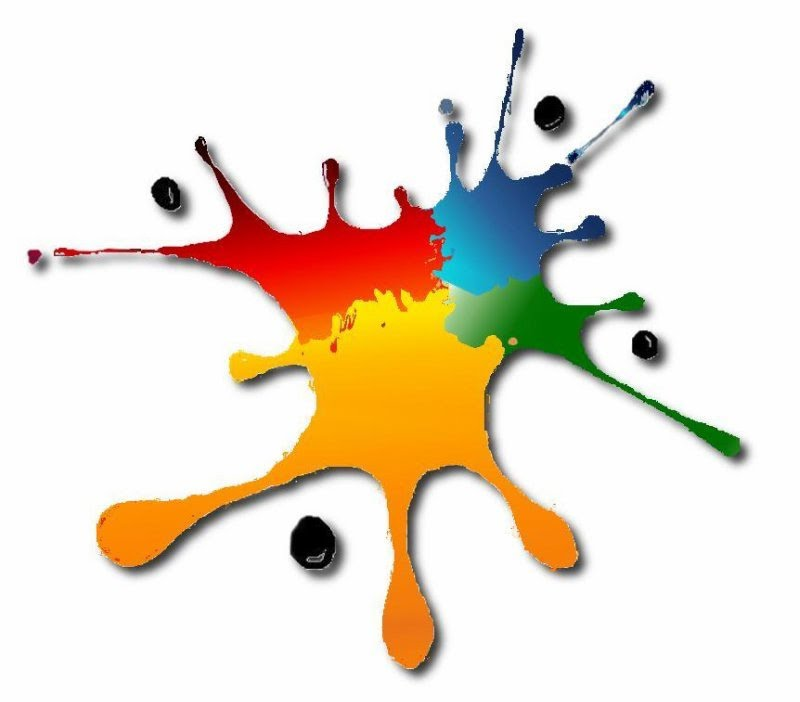
- Genre: Techno- Cultural-Sports
- Locations: Kolkata, India
- Founded: 2000
- Filing status: Student Run, Non-Profit Organization
- Sponsor: Indian Statistical Institute
- Prize money: Over 3 lakhs INR
- Website: www.isical.ac.in/~integration/

Integration is the annual techno-cultural fest of Indian Statistical Institute, Kolkata usually held during last three weekends of January each year. It is a large campus event in Kolkata and attracts participants from India and abroad.

== Introduction ==
Integration is a relatively new addition to the fests held in Kolkata. It is organised entirely by the students and research scholars of the Indian Statistical Institute (ISI). The fest is held in three parts: the Tech Chapter, the Sports Chapter and the Cultural Chapter.

The Tech Chapter is generally held on the second weekend of January. This part of Integration includes competitive events such as hackathons, scavenger hunts, esports tournaments and a Tech Quiz. Workshops and seminars on various technical fields are also conducted by academics.

The Cultural Chapter is held within one week after the Tech Chapter. Past guests at this part of Integration have included Sourav Ganguly, Pranab Mukherjee, Anupam Kher, Arun Shourie and Harsha Bhogle. The competitive events include debate (Contrapunto), extempore, singing, photography, movie making, dance and band competitions, among others. Prahelika, described as the biggest campus quiz in Eastern India, is held during this part of Integration.

The Sports Chapter was introduced in January 2013. It consists of indoor and outdoor sporting events such as football, cricket, chess, bridge and volleyball. The chess tournament is held in association with the West Bengal Chess Association.

== History ==
- 2010 : Integration was revived after 10 years. On-stage competitions: Smart (virtual stock market), Antakshari, Choice of Chance, Stand-up Comedy, Skit, Singing Competition, Debate, Extempore, etc. Offstage competitions: Creative Writing, Painting, Cartooning, Junk yard wars. An initiative called eco-pals where students took a green pledge to make the hostel campus plastic free. There were talks on Cryptography and Environment. Underground Authority, then known as "Banned", won the band competition.
- 2011 : As 2011 came, participation increased by leaps and bounds. Short movies and online events had participants from all over the world. Also, Prahelika -the biggest campus quiz in Eastern India- became a part of Integration. Integration organised a panel discussion on Expectations from Future Leaders, an interactive session attended by Shri Pranab Mukherjee, Mr. Sourav Ganguly, Dr. Arun Shourie, Mr. Anupam Kher and Mrs. Rita Bhimani. The event was compered by Mr. Harsha Bhogle. There were rocking performances by the reputed bands Hip Pocket, Fossils and Colors. A traditional folk dance "Chou-Nach" event was also organised.
- 2012 : This time integration saw the first international performance by Love Runs Blind, featuring the guitar legend Ayub Bachchu . This year, the Tech and Cultural Chapters were held separately on two consecutive weekends. The Gaming Competition was introduced. The 125th birth anniversary of Sukumar Ray was celebrated through a unique event named "Choracchi" - the Kabya Sabha, where renowned poets like Srijato and Apurba Dutta along with Mr. Chandi Lahiri, the famous cartoonist shed light on the life of Sukumar Ray and recited poems. A stage show on sand animation was also held.
- 2013 : Integration this year reached new heights as she celebrated 100 years of Indian Cinema. Usual events went on along with brand new ones in line with the theme. Prahelika maintained its stature with Arul Mani enchanting the crowd with his charismatic quizzing. Avial registered their first jig at Kolkata on the second day of the Cultural Chapter while Taaltantra, featuring Tanmoy Bose, closed with a mind-blowing showdown. Integration added an entirely new dimension to itself as it went forward to organize a Sports Chapter, which has arguably been the biggest on-campus sporting event in the city in recent times.

== Events ==
=== Tech Chapter ===
The Tech Chapter is generally held over the first two days. The major events of the Tech Chapter are :

- GROUND-ZERO : The national gamers meet, with teams participating in for the grand prize in games like Counter-Strike: Global Offensive and Dota 2 and individuals fighting their way to top in NFSMW and FIFA 11.
- Tech Quiz : This quiz contest tests the young minds from all over India on their acquaintance with all forms of Technology. It is attended by participants from all over West Bengal and carry very attractive prizes (laptops, iPods etc.).
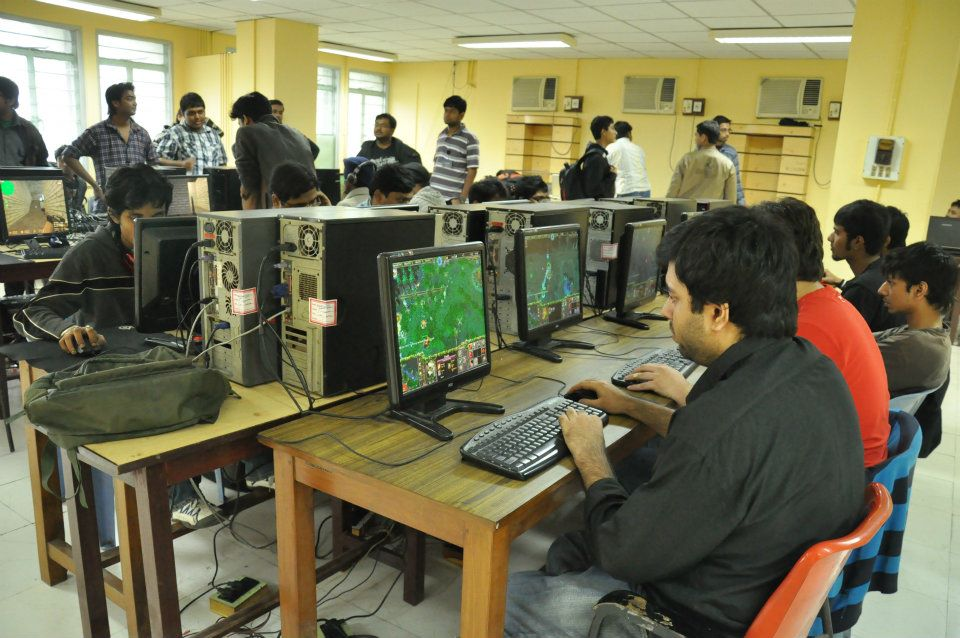
  Ground-Zero
- Robowars : This competition has two categories: manual and autonomous. It is a competition where teams will make their own bots at home, and they will be judged based on some predefined criteria.
- Junkyard Wars : It is a challenge to the best engineering minds. The participating teams are given the task to make a device (like crossbow, hovercraft, steered toy, etc.) out of junk material, on the spot. Then the teams will have to compete on a track or field using the device they make. Their performance will be judged based on some previously declared criteria.
- Seminars and Workshops : It provides an opportunity for students to interact with the maestros in academics and corporate sector. Workshop on ethical hacking and animation using sand medium has been held in the previous years.

Integration has a series of online events that start several days before the fest. Myst-IQ is a set of puzzles and quizzes relying mostly on logic and common sense. Market Mania is a virtual portfolio management game in which participants follow the Indian share market in real time, competing for prize money. Code-IT is an online coding competition in which participants are asked to come up with the most efficient and innovative algorithm for a coding problem.

=== Cultural Events ===
- Prahelika : A prize money of at least Rs. 25,000 in cash, along with other goodies, hosted by celebrity quiz-masters like Derek O'Brien, Harsha Bhogle and Arul Mani, it is one of the biggest campus quiz in Eastern India.

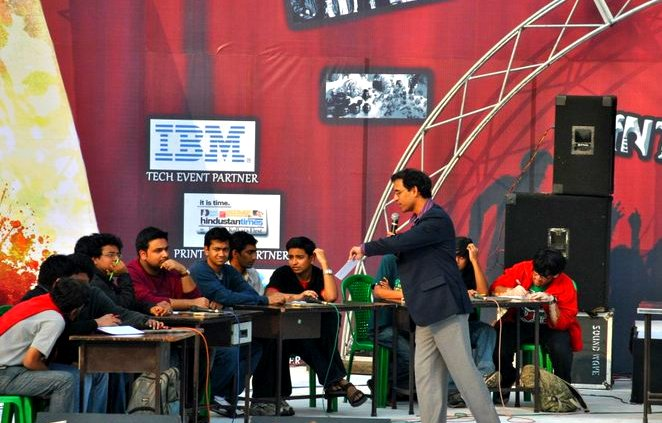
Prahelika

- Nikanna : With huge prizes at stake, the solo-dance participants from all over Bengal groove with the rhythm and deliver spell-binding performances.
- Jhankar : The best dance groups in the country treasure this opportunity to compete and win the coveted prizes and recognition from the hugely acclaimed judges.
- Impromptu : It is the extempore competition of Integration that usually takes place on the first day.
- Contrapunto : The debate competition is called Contrapunto. It takes place on the opening day of Integration. It witnesses participation by debaters across the country competing for the winners' trophy.
- Alaap : It is the solo singing competition. This competition is one of the biggest of its type in contemporary times.
- Band-e-Thlon : The best campus bands fight it out with each other. Underground Authority erstwhile Banned won this competition in 2010.
- Thru-d-lens : Thur-d-lens is the name by which the photography competition of Integration is called. It is a very coveted photography event of Eastern India. Niepce (Black and White) and Daguerre(Color) are the two categories. It has been jointly organised with PAD since 2016.
- Montage : The short-movie competition attracts participation from all across India. There have been foreign entries in this competition, but there is no recorded instance of any foreign film winning the competition. A few selected films are staged in front of the viewers and film critics in the city. The only foreign movie to have qualified for the final staging so far was from Glassgow. Film institutes and freelancers come together for the staging of Montage. Buddhadeb Dasgupta is among the notable judges who have judged this competition.
- Skit : Platform to show one’s acting skills.
- Pen-fight : This is the name by which the creative writing competition at Integration is known. It aims at recognizing and acknowledging young talents across the country. This event usually sees very thick participation from the students across West Bengal.
- Cartooning : This event aims at encouraging young cartoonists. It attracts participants from all over the state, with legends like Chandi Lahiri, judging every year. This event is usually covered enthusiastically by leading newspapers in the city. This has been organised in association with Humane Society International(India) since 2016.

== Panel discussion ==
The panel discussion is an interactive session discussing current issues. Past guests have included Pranab Mukherjee, Sourav Ganguly, Arun Shourie, Anupam Kher, Rita Bhimani, Chandi Lahiri, Srijato and Apurba Dutta.

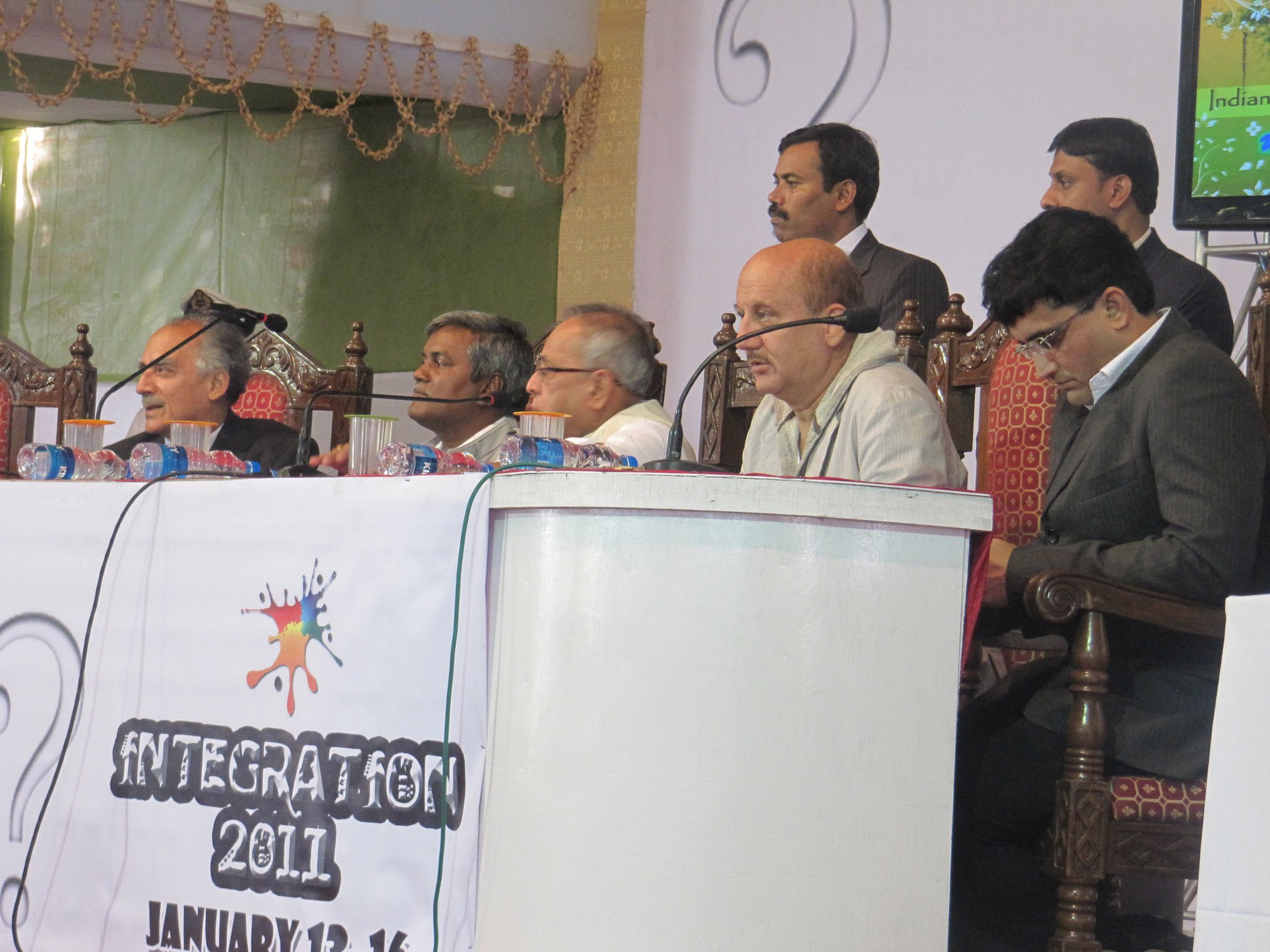
Panel discussion at integration '11

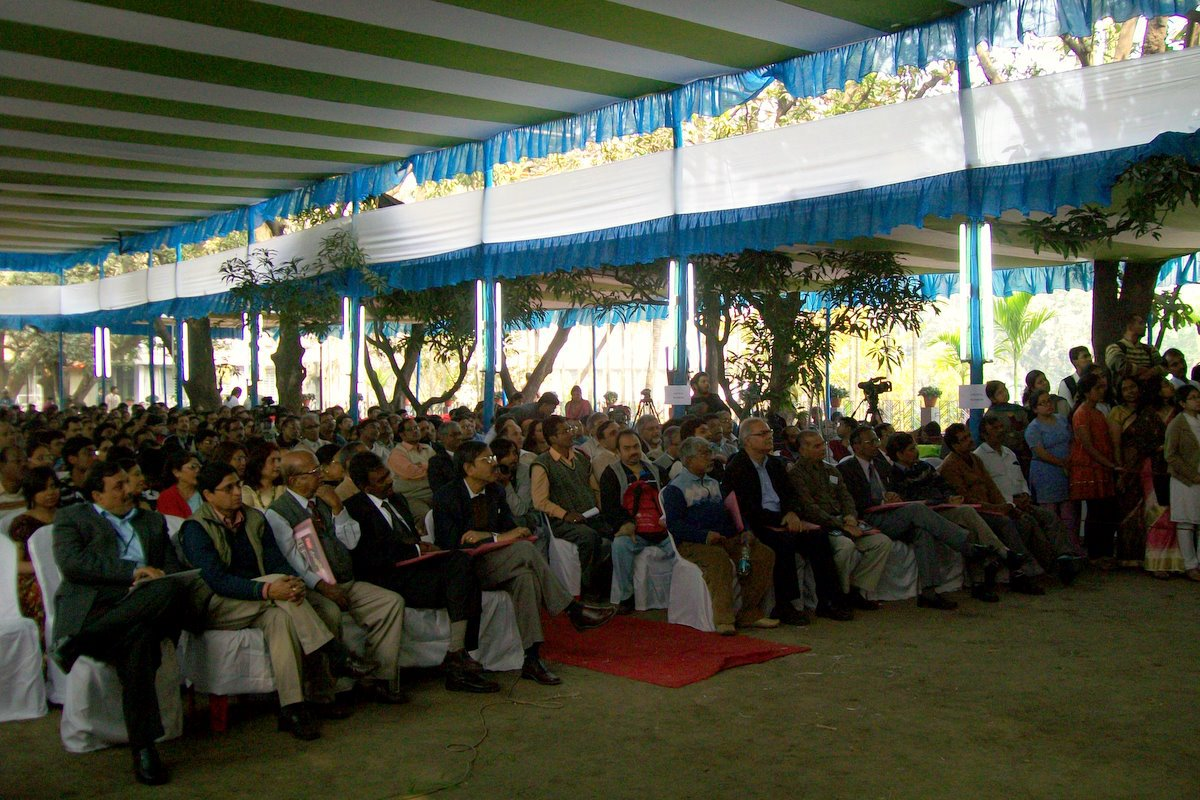
Audience at Panel Discussion

== Showdowns ==
Performers from India and abroad have appeared, including Fossils, Underground Authority, LRB, Colors, Cassini's Division and Chandrabindoo.

- 2013 : Avial (band), Taal Tantra featuring Tanmoy Bose
- 2014 : Agnee (band)
- 2015 : Raghu Dixit, Fossils (band), Kaahon, Crazy Petals.
- 2016 : Indian Ocean (band), Parikrama (band), Magic Moments featuring Vishwa Mohan Bhatt and Subhen Chatterjee
- 2017 : Coke Studio.
- 2018 : Ganesh Talkies (band), Parekh & Singh and Swarathma.
- 2019 : Nalayak the band and Monali Thakur.
- 2020 : The Local Train.

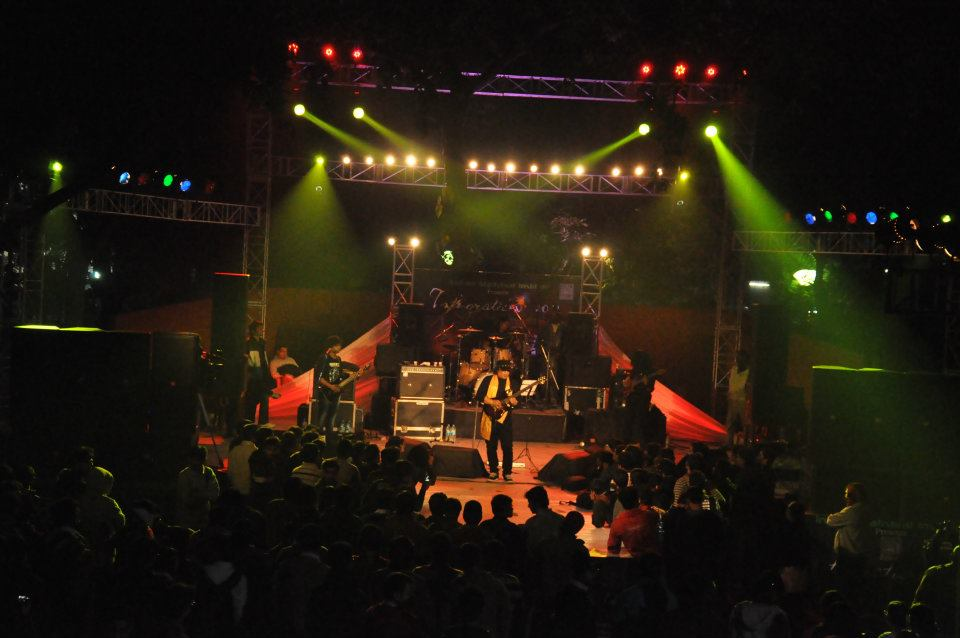
LRB at Integration'12

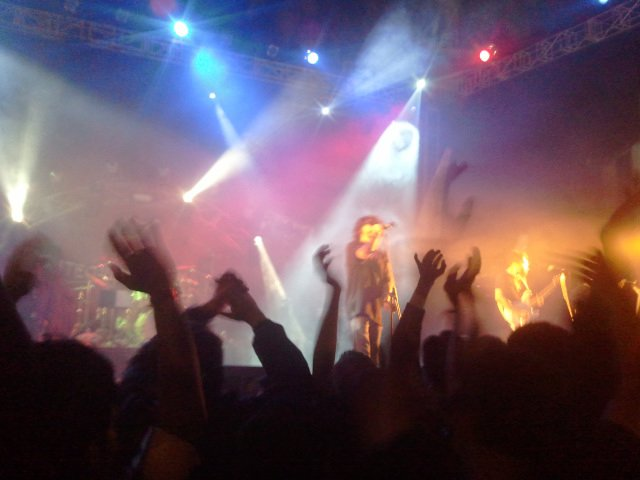
Fossils at Integration'11

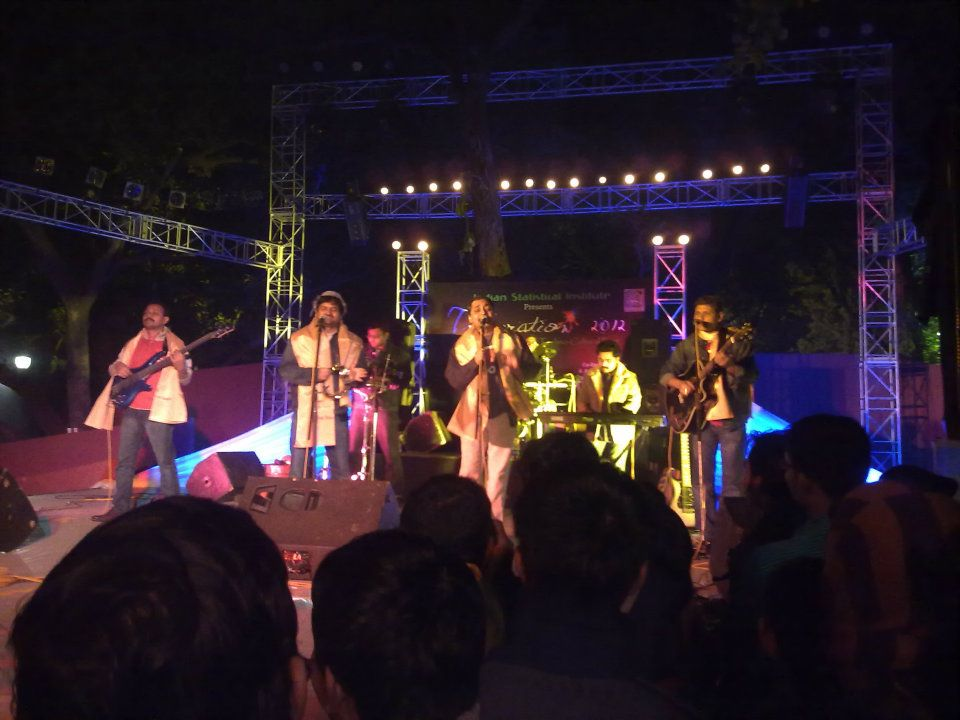
Chandrabindoo at Integration'12

.

== Celebrity Quotient ==
Guests at Integration have included Pranab Mukherjee, Sourav Ganguly, Rita Bhimani, Arun Shouri, Anupam Kher, Harsha Bhogle, Sandip Ray, Joy Bhattacharya, Chandi Lahiri, Chandril Bhattacharya, Srijato and Apurba Dutta.

== Sponsors ==
Integration's sponsors have included Ola Cabs, IBM, HDFC, Eclerx, Havells, LIC, Roland Corporation, Roche, ITC Limited, Tata Consultancy Services, National Insurance Company Limited, United Bank of India, UCO Bank, Punjab National Bank, Coca-Cola and Allahabad Bank.

== Media partners ==
Integration has received coverage from media outlets including The Daily Telegraph, The Times of India, The Indian Express, The Statesman, The Hindustan Times, Aaj Tak, ABP News, ABP Ananda, Channel 10, 24 Ghanta and Anandabazar Patrika. The fest seldom enters into exclusive partnerships with print media.

== Social Responsibility ==
Usually, 2% of the amount collected from sponsorship is donated to a social cause. An initiative to make the hostel campus plastic-free began in 2010.
