= Rupali Guitar =

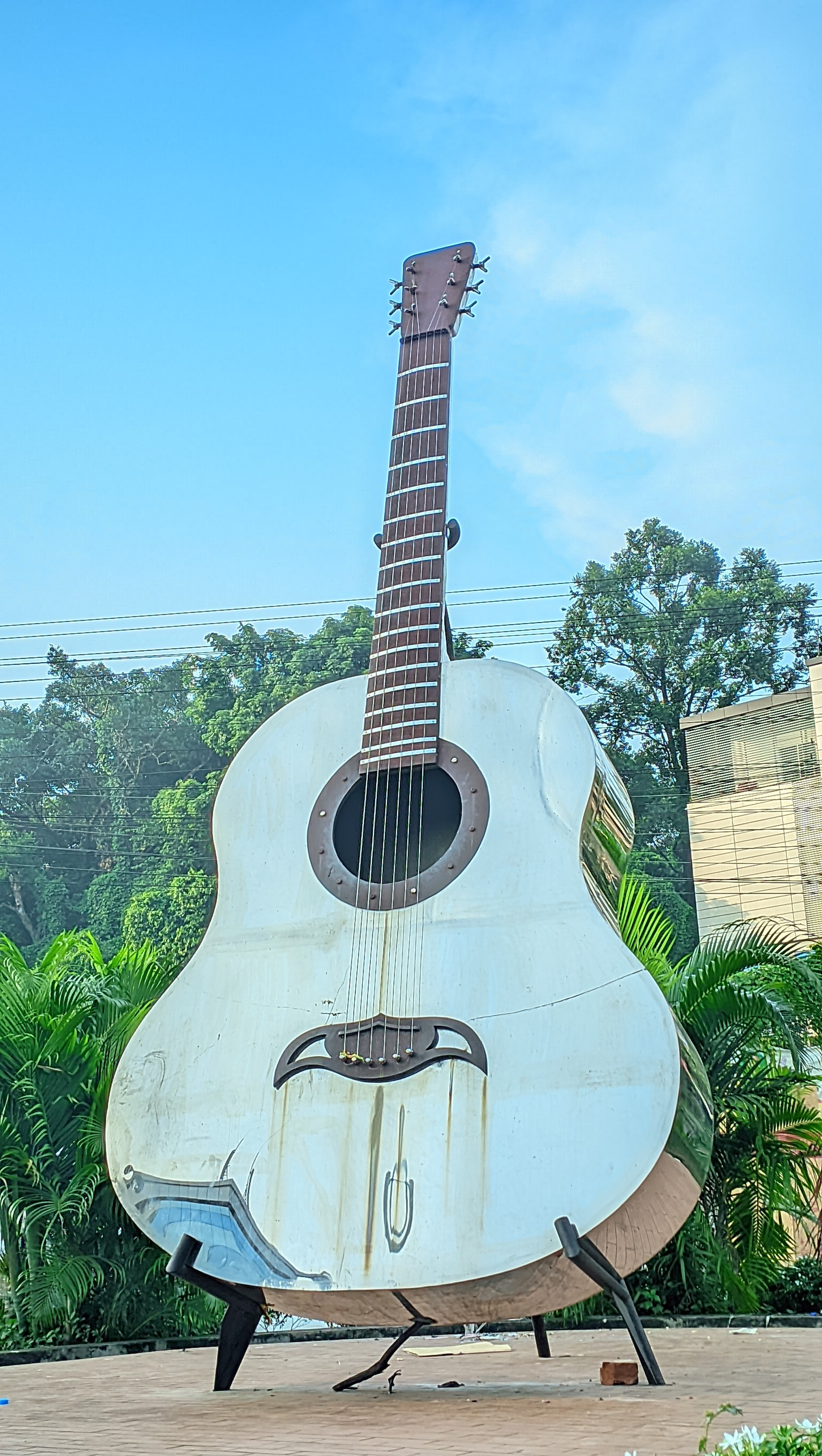
- Year: September 18, 2019
- Medium: Stainless steel, Iron
- Subject: Music
- Dimensions: 18 ft (5.5 m); 4.5 ft diameter (1.4 m)
- Location: Ayub Bacchu Chottor, Probortok Mor, Chittagong, Bangladesh
- 22.3608°N 91.8285°E
- Owner: Chittagong City Corporation

The Rupali Guitar is an iron and stainless steel sculpture which was created in memory of Ayub Bachchu, a legendary singer from Bangladesh and founder of Bangladeshi band LRB. The sculpture takes its name from the title of a song from the album Ferari Mon (1996). It is situated in Probortok Mor in Chittagong. The new name of Probortok Mor is Ayub Bachchu Chattar. The front of this sculpture is visible as it moves from the Golpahar Mor to the promoter turning point. The sculpture was unveiled on 18 September 2019. The sculpture was inaugurated by mayor A J M Nasir Uddin.
