= Ayub Bachchu =

Bangladeshi singer, musician, rockstar, guitarist and record producer (1962–2018)

- আইয়ুব বাচ্চু
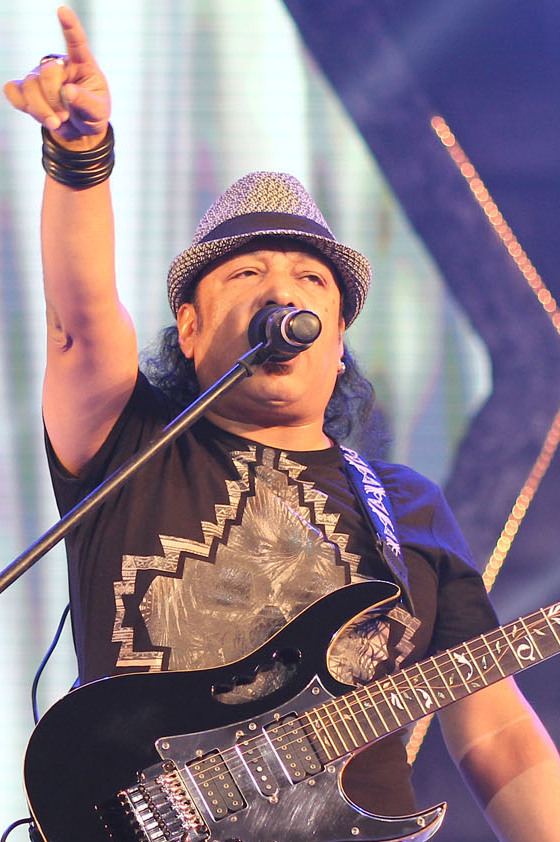
- Bachchu performing at Dhaka in 2014.
- Pronunciation: [ai̯ub bat͡ʃːu]
- Born: Ayub Bachchu Robin; 16 August 1962; Patiya, East Pakistan, Pakistan
- Died: 18 October 2018 (aged 56); Dhaka, Bangladesh
- Resting place: Chaitanya Goli, Chittagong, Bangladesh
- Occupations: Singer; musician; record producer; businessman
- Spouse: Ferdous Akhtar Chondona (m. 1991)
- Children: 2
- Awards: Ekushey Padak (2026, posthumous)
- Website: abkitchen.org

Ayub Bachchu (Note: Bengali pronunciation: [ai̯ub bat͡ʃːu].) (Bengali pronunciation: [ai̯ub bat͡ʃːu]; 16 August 1962 – 18 October 2018) was a Bangladeshi rock guitarist, composer, singer and songwriter, who was the founder of the Bangladeshi rock band Love Runs Blind and earned success as the lead singer and the lead guitarist of the band. He is considered a rock and pop culture icon in Bangladesh. He was one of the pioneers of Bangladeshi rock and pop music.

Born in Patiya, Bachchu came to Chittagong with his family in the early 1970s. His first band name was "Spider" (Which is the first band of Chittagong city). He joined "Spider" in 1974. He played with the band as the lead guitarist from year 1974 to 1977. Then he formed his first band "Ugly Boys" in 1977, while studying in high school and joined rock band Feelings (now known as Nagar Baul) as the guitarist the same year. He played in the band from 1977 to 1980. In 1980, he joined the band Souls (band) where he played for ten years and appeared in four studio albums including Super Souls (1982), College Er Corridore (1985), Manush Matir Kachakachi (1987) and East and West (1988). In 1991, he left the band to form his own band LRB, where he was the vocalist and guitarist for 27 years, until his death in 2018. He released the first ever double album: LRB I and LRB II in 1992, with the band. LRB's third studio album was Shukh, which featured "Cholo Bodle Jai", which became an instant hit. He also received great success as a solo artist. His first solo album Rokto Golap was released in September 1986. He got his breakthrough by releasing albums like Moyna (1988) and Koshto (1995) which received great success. He released only one instrumental rock album in his career: Sound of Silence (2007), which is the first ever instrumental album in Bangladesh. He has also worked in several movie songs, some of them are Anutopto (1993), Loottoraj (1997), Mon (1997) and Ammajan (1999). Ayub Bachchu's debut song, "Harano Bikeler Golpo" was written by renowned lyricist Shahid Mahmud Jangi. LRB's debut song "Ekdin Ghum Bhanga Shohore" was also written by renowned lyricist Shahid Mahmud Jangi which was the first released song of LRB. Bachchu released several best selling-albums with LRB, and as a solo performer.

He has won a record six Meril Prothom Alo Awards, one Citycell-Channel I Music Award with LRB and won the Bachsas Awards in the Best Male Vocal category in 2004. In 2017, he won the Tele Cine Lifetime Achievement Award. In 2026, he was posthumously awarded with the Ekushe Padak, for his special contribution to music.

== Early life ==
Bachchu was born on 16 August 1962 to a Bengali family of Muslim Chowdhuries in Khorna, Patiya, Chittagong District, East Pakistan. He was the son of Mohammad Ishaque Chowdhury and Nurjahan Begum. The family moved to Chittagong city after the Liberation War of Bangladesh in 1971. They resided in Jubilee Road. He had two brothers and was the eldest among them all. His daak naam was Robin. He got his first acoustic guitar from his father as a gift in 1973, when he was in class six. He learned to play guitar from Jacob Dias (the founder of "Spider" band), who used to live in Chittagong. "Spider" band is the first band of Chittagong. From 1974 to 1977 he was playing guitar in Spider band and then he made his own band Ugly Boyz. He borrowed an electric guitar from his friend, Kumar Bishwajit, which was a Teisco Guitar. Bishwajit gave him the guitar after he [Bachchu] showed more interest towards it. He was very attracted to the guitar playing techniques of Jimi Hendrix and Joe Satriani. He was admitted to Government Muslim High School in 1975. In 1979, he graduated from Muslim High School. His parents did not support him on becoming a musician. But, after his family saw his passion for rock music, they agreed on letting him become a musician. While studying in high school, Bachchu formed a band named "Golden Boys", which was later renamed as "Ugly Boys". Kumar Bishwajit was the lead singer of the band and Bachchu was the guitarist. They used to do club shows and shows in weddings (Mostly in the Patiya Upazilla). The group disbanded after Bachchu joined Souls in 1980.

== Career ==
=== 1977–1990: Feelings and Souls ===
While working with his own band Ugly Boys, Bachchu joined the rock band Feelings (now known as Nagar Baul) in 1977. Feelings' frontman James stated that he saw Bachchu playing guitar at a tea stall. He was amazed by the playing style of Bachchu and he asked him to join the band. In the mid-1977, he joined the band as the lead guitarist and only stayed with the band for next two years until in 1980, he got a contract from Souls, as their lead guitarist Sajed ul Alam had left the band for the United States. Bachchu was playing with Feelings in a club in Chittagong, where Souls' keyboardist Naquib Khan was present. He was amazed by the playing of Bachchu and he talked to lead singer Tapan Chowdhury about it. Both of them saw Bachchu playing in the club next day and they asked him to join Souls. He joined Souls in early-1980 and played with the band for next 10 years as the lead guitarist, songwriter and occasional singer. He had appeared on three studio albums College Er Corridore (1985), Manush Matir Kachakachi (1987) and East and West (1988). In the late-1990, Bachchu left Souls and went on to form his own band Little River Band, which later became famous as Love Runs Blind. He reunited with Souls in several reunion shows and has performed with members of the band like Tapan Chowdhury, Kumar Bishwajit and Naquib Khan in several shows. In 2012, Bachchu told The Daily Star that:

I left Souls because of two different tastes in sounds. They liked one kind of music, I liked another. I was into loud, rocking, powerful sounds, and the rest of the members wanted quiet, melodious sounds. You cannot just compromise day after day. We never really had any big arguments, but it occurred to me that it would be better if I just quit and do something different.

=== 1991–2018: LRB ===
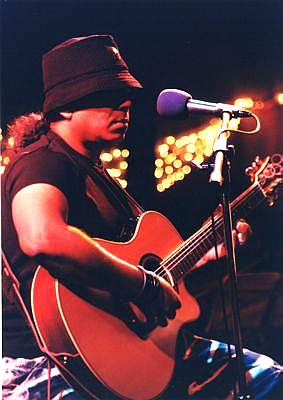
Bachchu performing in 2008

After Bachchu got out of Souls in the late-1990, he came to Dhaka in 1991 and in January he married Ferdous Chandana, with whom he had a relationship since 1986. He formed a band named Yellow River Band on 5 April 1991 with Saidul Hasan Swapan on bass guitars, S.I. Tutul on keyboards and Habib Anwar Joy on drums. (Note: Many have stated that Bachchu named his band Little Robin's Band (as his nickname was Robin) when forming in 1991 and changed the name in 1997 when Bachchu found out he was not little anymore. But, it is considered to be a rumor as Bachchu was already 29 years old when he was forming the band. Bachchu has stated that Yellow River Band was the band's first name and they were mistakenly called Little River Band in a club show in Dhaka. As Bachchu liked the name he kept the name for the band. But, they had to change it again in 1997 after finding out about the Australian rock band with the same name.) When they were performing in a club in the mid-1991, they were mistakenly called the Little River Band, which Bachchu liked and officially named his band. But, after they heard about the Australian rock band of the same name they changed their name to Love Runs Blind in 1997. In April 1991, LRB did their first ever concert in the University of Dhaka, a concert that was arranged by BAMBA, celebrating the downfall of autocratic leader Hussein Muhammad Ershad. In January 1992, they released the first ever double album: LRB I and LRB II. The band's third studio album Shukh, was released in June 1993. It included "Cholo Bodle Jai", which regarded by some as Bachchu's greatest work. They released several albums in the 1990s and soon became one of the most popular rock acts of Bangladesh. In 1996, they performed in Bengaluru, which was their first concert outside Bangladesh. LRB is the only Bangladeshi artist to perform in the Madison Square Garden in New York City. In 2018, LRB got disbanded after Bachchu's death.

=== Solo career ===
==== Early solo work: 1986–1988 ====
While working with Souls, Bachchu had already recorded and released two album: Rokto Golap and Moyna, both of which mostly contained pop rock songs. Some of the songs on those albums also contained classical music fusion and featured instrument like tabla. Rokto Golap, contain pop rock, classical and also adhunik bangla songs, while Moyna is an album that features pop rock and hard rock songs and helped him get his breakthrough. It has sold an estimated 60,000 copies in Bangladesh. Released in September 1986, Rokto Golap is his first solo album, released by Zahed Electronics, which contains the first hard rock song released by him, "Anamika". The album featured Ahsan Elahi (Fanty) of Feelings on drums and percussion. Manam Ahmed of Miles on keyboards. Bachchu played both the bass guitar and electric guitar on the album. Ahsan Elahi (Fanty) and Manam Ahmed are also featured in his second album. The second album Moyna also features Emon and Mintu on keyboards and Khayem Pearu on bass guitars.

==== Koshto: 1995 ====
Bachchu left Souls in the late-1990 and formed his own band Love Runs Blind on 5 April 1991. The band released the first ever double album in Bangladesh: LRB I and LRB II in 1992. Bachchu didn't release a solo album for seven years. After the release of LRB's Ghumonto Shohore in 1995, he went on to record the album Koshto in the Audio Art Studio, where Ghumonto Shohore was recorded. The album came out in October 1995. The album is regarded by many as his best work. It included hit songs like "Koshto Pete Valobashi", "Koshto Kake Bole" and "Jege Achi Eka". The album was produced by Bachchu and co-produced by Azam Babu and musicians were S.I. Tutul of LRB on keyboards and Ahsan Elahi (Fanty) of Feelings on drums and percussion. By the release of the album, it was well received by fans. By 1996, the album had sold over 300,000 copies and is one of the best selling albums of Bangladesh.

==== Shomoy and Eka: 1998–1999 ====
Though Bachchu left Souls because of his love for "rocking, powerful guitar music", his solo career was mostly pop rock, soft rock music. Since the beginning of his career, Bachchu had a fascination for blues, jazz and funk. He's love for those genres reflected on his band, LRB's music, but he wanted to do blues, jazz and funk in his solo career. By the early-1998, Bachchu founded his own studio AB Kitchen, which later became a label. Bachchu had already released two double albums with his band LRB: LRB I and LRB II in 1992 and Amader and Bishmoy in 1998. He wanted to release double albums as a solo artist. The recording sessions for his fourth album Shomoy and fifth album Eka started in the mid-1998 in his own studio. Both albums were released in early-1999, "Shomoy" by Soundtek Electronics & "Eka" by Sangeeta. Both albums wasn't well received by fans like his previous album. About this two albums Bachchu said that:

Those albums were not received well at all. My regular audience thought it was too high-thought. They didn't want something so serious. After that, I didn't experiment much in my solo albums. What's the point if no one appreciates them.

==== Maya: 2000 ====
In the year 2000 Ayub Bachchu went to America tour & he made a solo album contract with Shaheen Rahman (Owner of First Recording Company of Bangladesh, D-Series Disco Recording & Entertainment). Ayub Bachchu completed 3-4 songs for the album but the album never released.

=== Other works ===
Bachchu performed live with Richard and Le Gang, Remo Fernandes, Nandon Bugchi and Bickram Ghosh of India and Azam Khan, Feelings, Miles, Warfaze. He appeared as a judge on "IIM Joka Rock Fest" in India, Benson and Hedges Star Search I and II, and D-Rockstar I. Bachchu was one of the panel judges of Bangladeshi Idol. He led LRB at the South Asian Bands Festival 2013. He has worked as a music director for Azam Khan, Niloy Das, Khalid Hasan Milu, Tapan Chowdhury, Rupam Islam, Hassan Abidur Reja Jewel, Alam Ara Minu, Jholo and many others. Bachchu was renowned for his musical scoring of television commercials. He wrote songs for Grameenphone, provided the tune and music arrangement for the song "Dol Lage Dol" for the local television channels on the occasion of the FIFA World Cup 2014. Bachchu collaborated with Radio Foorti to bring new talents and fresh voices into the spotlight by giving them a platform to perform and shine. Bachchu was one of the leaders of Bangladesh Musical Bands Association (BAMBA). In Bangabandhu National Stadium, in the "T-20 World Cup 2014" opening ceremony, Bachchu got in a controversy with Hamin Ahmed of Miles, which led him to cancel the membership of the association.

== Personal life ==
=== Personal relationships ===
==== Ferdous Chandana ====
Bachchu met Ferdous Akhtar Chondona in the early 1986, when he came to Dhaka to record his debut solo album Rokto Golap. He said that, he fell in love with Chondona when he saw her picture stuck in his friend's mirror. When Chondona's family found out about Bachchu they didn't let her meet him. He said that the LRB song "Ferari Mon", from the band's self titled debut album told the story of how he wanted to meet Chondona, "This mind of mine, doesn't care for any barrier. Hoping to find you, it comes back again and again." He left for Dhaka with only BDT ৳600 with him. He was struggling to live in Dhaka and pay his rents in the hotel Blue Nile in 36, New Elephant Road, Dhaka. He got back to Chittagong after the recording ended for his debut album. When he left Souls in late 1990, he came to Dhaka and proposed Chondona to marry him. Chondona's family didn't agree at first, but later both Bachchu's and Chondona's family agreed on letting them marry. He married Chondona on January 31, 1991. The couple had two children: daughter Fairuz Saffra Ayub (b. 1994) and son Ahnaf Tazwar Ayub (b. 1996).

=== AB Kitchen ===
AB Kitchen is a full service audio recording studio and production company founded by Ayub Bachchu in 1998. Over 40 studio albums, numerous AD Jingles, TV drama, films and film scores have been recorded in the studio. The first album produced by the label was Bachchu's Shomoy in 1999. From 2001, all the albums of LRB have been recorded and released by the label. It has also started three projects, including D-Rockstars (2005), R-Music (2006) and Sa 2 Sa (2007). All of these were televised respectively in G-Series TV, RTV and Channel I.

== Musicianship ==
=== Guitars ===
Ayub Bachchu had fallen in love for the first time when he was a teenager. Though it was not just for any tootsie from the neighborhood. It was for the smell of the burnished fret-board and the sound of the six strings that was the gateway to his own utopia. It took him to his paradise, where he kept exploring until the last moments of his life like an evergreen wanderer. Till the very day he died, Bachchu had no less than 60 guitars in his collection, which he took care of like a father does to his children. Over a week has now gone by after the magician's departure. His beloved offspring Tazwar and Fairuz still cannot hide their teary eyes. Come to wonder, aren't his guitars also weeping for their foregoer?

— The Daily Star, October 2018

Bachchu had cited Jimi Hendrix as the "biggest influence on his guitar playing". He has also cited Steve Vai and Joe Satriani as a big influence on his playing. In 2003, after S.I. Tutul had left LRB, Bachchu further didn't add a keyboardist in the lineup. He recruited Abdullah al Masud as the rhythm guitarist of the band. Also, Bachchu was becoming interested in guitarists like John Petrucci, Jason Becker, Rusty Cooley and Sacred Mother Tongue guitarist Andy James. Since then, LRB's music has gone much louder than the past and the band started releasing heavy metal songs.

At the time of his death, Bachchu had a collection of 65 guitars. He mostly played Ibanez guitars, particularly the Carvin guitar. He used Carvin Kiesel guitars, Dean Rusty Cooley RC6 and Michael Angelo Batio. He also owned various signature guitars by some of his favorite guitarists, including a Steve Vai JEM Junior White, Jason Becker JB200C. In July 2017, he sold five of his guitars to young guitar players, with whom he wanted to start a competition of guitarists. (Note: Sources indicate that Bachchu sold five of his guitars because he couldn't bear the maintenance costs for them anymore. The five guitars were Ernie Ball Music Man Axis, Carvin Jason Becker, Ernie Ball Music Man John Petrucci and Charvel.) He used a Marshall JCM2000 amp onstage.

=== Early influences ===
Most of all I like Hendrix. He did not make the guitar playing very critical note after note. He played the guitar as per his feelings. I have been trying that.

— Dhaka Tribune, October 2018

Bachchu's singing style has often been found similar to Adhunik bangla musicians. As he was a bandmate with Tapan Chowdhury in Souls, he had an influence from Adhunik music. Indian musician Prabuddha Banerjee said that: "I found his voice extremely romantic and I always wondered if he could sing Bengali retro numbers. In fact, though he was a rock musician, his style of singing always captured the romanticism of adhunik bangla music. Bachchu's high pitched screaming in the LRB songs "Gotokal Raate" and "Khoniker Jonno", from the band's third album Shukh, has been cited similar to the high pitched vocals of Ian Gillan of Deep Purple. He was also a big fan of Azam Khan. Bachchu was inspired by him to write and sing rock songs in Bengali.

Bachchu's lyrics are inspired by the Eagles, Deep Purple, Pink Floyd and the Jimi Hendrix Experience. He has stated that the lyrics' of the Eagles songs "Witchy Woman" and "Hotel California" are one of his most favorite lyrics. Also, the Beatles and Iron Maiden were among his lyrics inspiration.

== Death ==
In 2009, Bachchu underwent a successful heart valve surgery and became a regular patient at the Square Hospital. Bachchu was admitted to the Square Hospital on 27 November 2012. He was admitted in the Coronary Care Unit (CCU) under supervision of Dr. Mirza Nizamuddin of the hospital. Bachchu was suffering from lung ailment. Due to accretion of fluid in his lungs, he was experiencing respiratory problems. He recovered after receiving treatment. On 18 October 2018, he died of cardiac failure at his residence in Maghbazar, Dhaka at the age of 56. Dr. Mirza Nizamuddin of Square Hospital's Director of Medical Services said to the Dhaka Tribune, "Ayub Bachchu suffered heart failure at his home around 9:30 am, and left for Square Hospital with his driver by car. He died on his way to the hospital. He was found dead on arrival after he reached the hospital at 9:40 am. On-duty doctors announced his death at 9:55 am." He gave his last performance in Zilla School, Rangpur, Bangladesh, two days before his death. He was declared dead at the Square Hospital, Dhaka. He was kept in the Central Shaheed Minar up to four hours on 19 October, where his contemporaries and fans paid tribute to him for the last time. His first Janaza was held in the National Eidgah Field in Dhaka. His body was taken to Chittagong City on 20 October 2018 in his maternal house in East Madarbari. He was taken in the Jamaitul Falah Mosque for his 4th and last Janaza. He was buried in the graveyard of Chaitanya Goli, beside his mother's grave.

=== Tribute concert ===
After the death of Bachchu, rock and metal artists of Bangladesh held a tribute concert at the Music and Dance Auditorium of Bangladesh Shilpakala Academy on 2 December 2018, arranged by BAMBA. Some of the notable performances included, "Keu Shukhi Noy" performed by Shafin Ahmed, "Rupali Guitar" performed by Bappa Mazumder, "Nil Bedona" by Jamshed Chowdhury (Powersurge). Imrul Karim Emil (Shunno) and Sufi Maverick (Arbovirus) together performed the song "Bangladesh".

Artists from both West Bengal and Bangladesh held a tribute concert for Bachchu at the Patuli Lokosanskriti Mela Ground in Kolkata on 24 December, titled "In the Memorium of Ayub Bachchu, the Rocking of two Bangla". The concert was organized by Cafe Kabira, a popular cafe in Kolkata. Bangladeshi musicians included, Maqsoodul Haque (Maqsood 'O Dhaka), Mehreen, Sina Hasan (Bangla Five), George Lincoln D'Costa (Artcell), Subrata Barua Rony (ex-Souls), Imran Hussain (Rockstrata). Bachchu's teacher Jacob Dayas was also present at the concert. The show featured Indian artists like, Pradip Chattopadhyay Bula and Bapi (Moheener Ghoraguli), Anindya (Shohor), Avijit Burman and Soumitra Roy (Bhumi), Upal (Chandrabindu), Shilajit Majumder, Gaurav Chattopadhyai (Lakkhichhara), Bramhakhapa, Deb Chowdhury and Sidhu (Cactus) performed at the concert.

10 Bangladeshi bands from Canada including, Oboshor, Band4, Tulu and the Lightman, Sector 2.0, Reflection, Chandan and Friends, Shoor, Shikor, Jantrik, TWB and Manush held a tribute concert at the Cardinal Newman High School in Toronto on 15 December 2018.

== Legacy ==
"The trend in Bangladeshi music that Azam Khan initiated was taken to a new height by Ayub Bachchu. His death is an irreparable loss for Bangladeshi music."

— Fakir Alamgir

Bachchu ranked second on The Top Tens list of "Top 10 Greatest Guitarist of Bangladesh". Ibrahim Ahmed Kamal who ranked first in the list has said that, "The ranking is not correct, it was created to abuse the Great Ayub Bachchu". He is also credited for popularizing rock music in Bangladesh in the 1990s as the frontman of LRB and as a solo artist, along with Nagar Baul, Miles and Ark. He is also considered to be one of the "big three rockstars of Bangladesh" along with Azam Khan and James. He is also considered to be the first electric guitarist in Bangladesh to use distortion in songs. About that he said to Ekattor TV: "I was being forced to leave Souls, because I wanted to play distorted guitar".

Guitarist who were influenced by him includes, Ibrahim Ahmed Kamal (Warfaze), Iqbal Asif Jewel (Miles, Legend, Warfaze), Ershad Zaman (Artcell), George Lincoln D' Costa (Artcell), Kazi Faisal Ahmed (Metal Maze, Artcell), Oni Hasan (Vibe, Warfaze), Emon Chowdhury (Chirkut), Samir Hafiz (Powersurge, Severe Dementia, AvoidRafa).

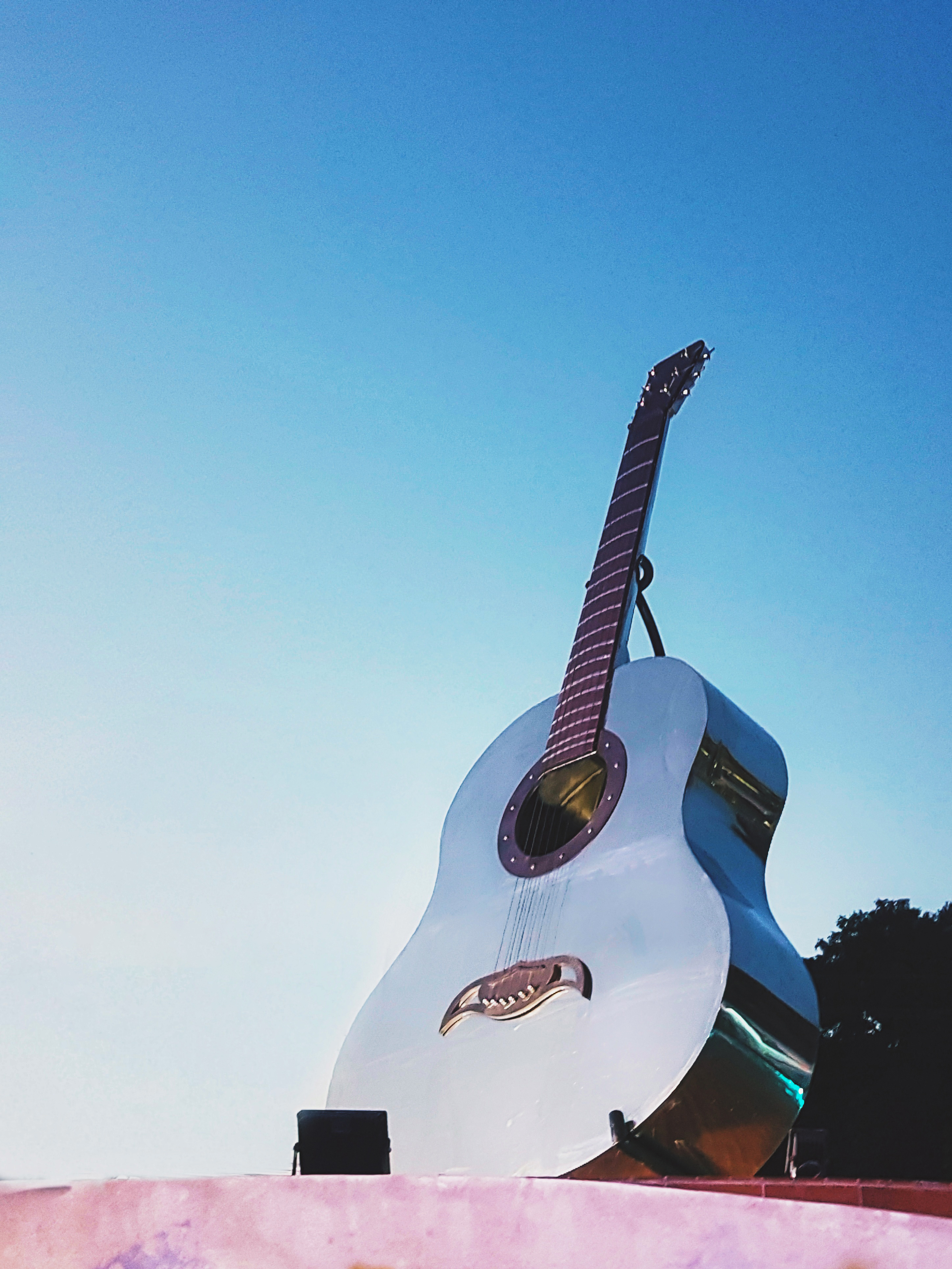
The Rupali Guitar in Probortok Circle, Chittagong

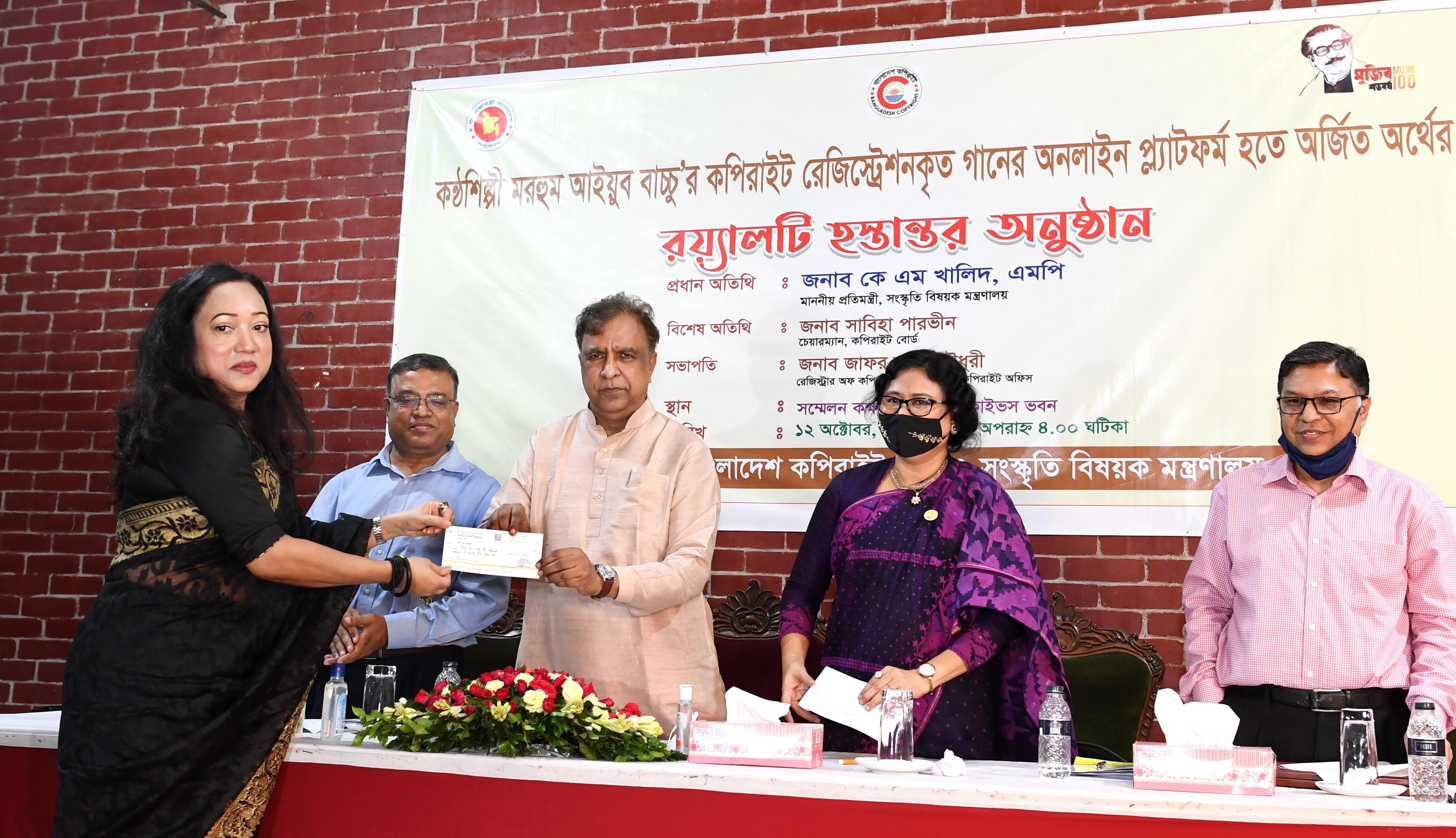
Ayub's wife, Ferdous Ayub Chandana, receiving royalties for Bachchu's work (2021)

Ex-Minister of Cultural Affairs, Asaduzzaman Noor said, "the fact that people from all walk of life were affected by the departure of Ayub Bachchu is testament to his greatness as an artist. I was fortunate enough to have personally known him since his starting days. He was an immensely passionate person." Hamin Ahmed of Miles said, "when Ayub Bachchu started his career, the guitar wasn't as prominent as an instrument. He made sure that it was the heart and soul of his music, and the entire country followed. That alone is enough to explain his legacy." Bappa Mazumder of Dalchhut said, "The great man not only taught us about music, but taught us how to be a great human. I always admired how much he loved his mother, and requested other people to take care of their parents." Indian singer-songwriter Sahana Bajpaie said to Daily Sun: "I was 12 when I first realised there is a Bengali musician who plays the guitar like Jimi Hendrix. He was one of the pioneers of Bengali rock music. My teenage was inspired by his music. He became a family friend when I was in Bangladesh. His simplicity was outstanding. His contributions to music will be remembered by generations to come."

On 19 December 2018 Asif Akbar has released a song for Ayub Bachchu, with the title "A Tribute to the Great Legend Ayub Bachchu" from Dhruba Music Station.

On 20 October 2018, the mayor of Chittagong City Corporation, A J M Nasir Uddin proposed that an "important road in the port city Chittagong be named after him and a seminar hall in Muslim Hall be named after him." Chattogram City Corporation Mayor AJM Nasir Uddin unveiled the sculpture of the guitar at the Probortok intersection in Chittagong. The sculpture of the 18-feet tall guitar is made of steel and has six strings.

=== Achievements ===
16th Tele Cine Awards

Year	Nominee / work	Award	Result
2017	Ayub Bachchu	Lifetime Achievement Award	Won

32nd Bachsas Awards

Year	Nominee / work	Award	Result
2004	Ayub Bachchu	Best Male Vocal	Won

Meril Prothom Alo Awards

Year	Nominee / work	Award	Result
1998	Love Runs Blind	Best Band of the Year	Won
1999	Love Runs Blind	Best Band of the Year	Won
2000	Love Runs Blind	Best Band of the Year	Won
2001	Mon Chaile Mon Pabe	Album of the Year	Won
2005	Love Runs Blind	Best Band of the Year	Won
2007	Sporsho	Album of the Year	Won
2009	"Bolini Tomai"	Best Male Vocal of the Year	Nominated

Citycell-Channel I Music Awards

Year	Nominee / work	Award	Result
2007	Sporsho	Album of the Year	Won

== Discography ==
=== Solo albums ===
- Rokto Golap (1986)
- Moyna (1989)
- Koshto (1995)
- Somoy (1999)
- Eka (1999)
- Prem Tumi Ki (2000)
- Duti Mon (2002)
- Kafela (2002)
- Prem Premer Moto (2003)
- Pother Gaan (2004)
- Vatir Gaane Matir Tane (2006)
- Jibon (2006)
- Sound of Silence (2007)
- Rim Jhim Brishti (2008)
- Bolini Kokhono (2009)
- Jiboner Golpo (2015)

=== Souls ===
- College Er Corridore (1985)
- Manush Matir Kachakachi (1987)
- East & West (1988)

=== Love Runs Blind ===
- L.R.B I (1992)
- L.R.B II (1992)
- সুখ (Happiness) (1993)
- তবুও (Yet) (1994)
- Chomok (1994) - EP
- ঘুমন্ত শহরে (In the Sleeping City) (1995)
- Capsule 500mg (1995) - EP
- Screw Driver (1996) - EP
- "স্বপ্ন (Dream)" (1996)
- ফেরারী মন: Unplugged Live (1996)
- Dhun (1998) - EP
- আমাদের? (Ours?) (1998)
- বিস্ময় (Wonder) (1998)
- মন চাইলে মন পাবে (If You Want My Heart, You'll Get it) (2000)
- অচেনা জীবন (Unknown Life) (2003)
- মনে আছে নাকি নাই (Do You Remember, or Not) (2005)
- স্পর্শ (Touch) (2008)
- যুদ্ধ (War) (2012)
- রাখে আল্লাহ মারে কে (Allah Keeps, Who Kills) (2016)

=== Film scores ===
Below is the list of films where Bachchu produced the original soundtrack.

- Moha Genjam (1994)
- Luttoraj (1996)
- Shanto Keno Mastan (1998)
- Spordha
- Sagorika (1998)
- Kalo Chosma (1998)
- Teji (1998)
- Asha Amar Asha (1998)
- Lal Badshah (1999)
- Miss Daina (1999)
- Zor (1999)
- Moger Mulluk
- Billat Ferot Meye
- Ammajan (1999)
- Dujon Dujonar (1999)
- Tero Panda Ek Gunda
- Jobor Dokhol
- Gunda Number One (2000)
- Janer Jaan (2000)
- Bhoyonkar Bishu (2000)
- Barsha Badol (2001)
- Mon (2003)
- Bachelor (2004)
- Wrong Number (2004)
- Barricade (2005)
- Chander Moto Bou (2009)
- Chorabali (2012)
- Television (2012)
- Ek Cup Cha (2014)

== See also ==
- Love Runs Blind
- চলো বদলে যাই (Let's Change)
