= Bachchu =

Bachchu is a surname. It may refer to:

- Ayub Bachchu (1962–2018), Bangladeshi rock guitarist, composer and singer-songwriter, who was the founder of the Bangladeshi rock band LRB
- Bachchu Singh, Indian politician and a member of the Rajasthan Legislative Assembly
- Nazmul Huda Bachchu (1938–2017), Bangladeshi film and television actor
- Rawshan Ara Bachchu (1932–2019), Bangladeshi activist
- Sadek Bachchu (born 1955), Bangladeshi film actor

== See also ==
- Abul Kalam Azad (politician, born 1947), Bangladeshi war criminal also known as Bachchu
