= Love Runs Blind discography =

Cataloguing of published recordings by LRB

LRB discography
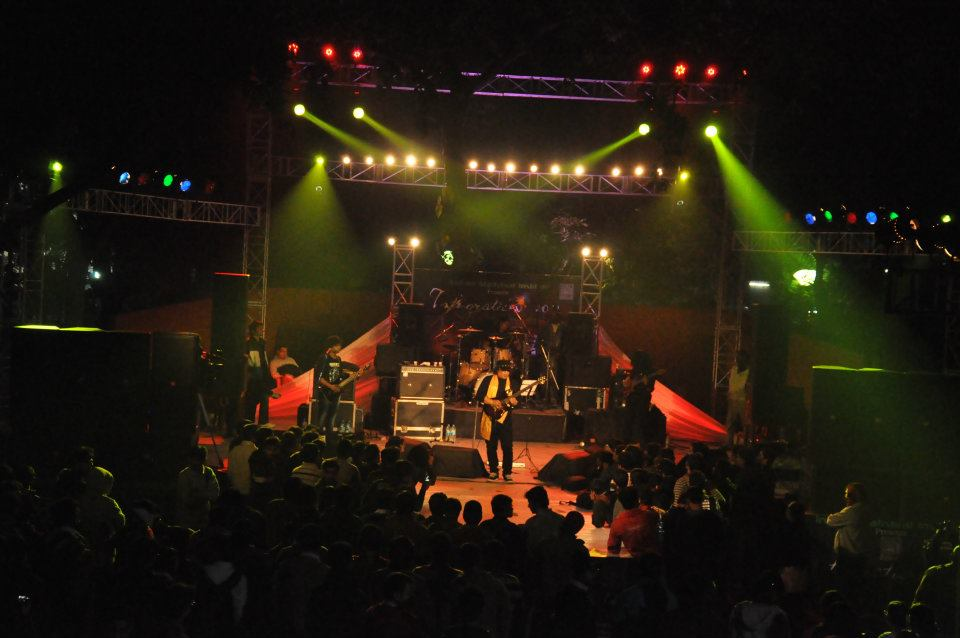
- LRB performing live in Integration in Kolkata, West Bengal, India in 2012
- Studio albums: 13
- Live albums: 1
- Compilation albums: 8
- Music videos: 15
- Music downloads: 5

The discography of the Bangladeshi rock band Love Runs Blind (often abbreviated as LRB) consisted of fourteen studio albums, one live album, five music downloads, two compilation albums, fifteen music videos and appeared on six mixed albums. Formed in Chittagong on 5 April 1991, their first lineup consisted of vocalist and guitarist Ayub Bachchu, keyboardist S.I. Tutul, bass guitarist Saidul Hasan Swapan and drummer Habib Anwar Joy. Their first studio album LRB I and LRB II was released in 1992 and was a double album, which was the first ever double album in Bangladesh.

Love Runs Blind's third studio album Shukh was released in 1993 and was their most commercially successful album. The album contained the hit songs "চলো বদলে যাই (Let's Change)", "রুপালি গিটার (Silver Guitar)", "গতকাল রাতে (Last Night)" and "কী আশাতে? (What to Expect)". Their fourth studio album Tobuo was released in 1994. The album was not well received by fans and did not contain hit songs like their previous album, but it cemented them as a hard rock band, as their previous albums had contained soft rock and pop rock songs. Their fifth album Ghumonto Shohore was released in 1995 and was a massive hit. The title track became a hit and was considered as a classic Love Runs Blind song. They released their sixth studio album Shopno in 1996. In September 1996, they released the live album, Ferari Mon: Unplugged Live. which was the first ever live album in Bangladesh and the only live album by the band. They released another double album in 1998: Amader and Bishmoy.

In 1999, frontman Bachchu set up his own studio AB Kitchen, which shortly became a record label. They released Mon Chaile Mon Pabe from Soundtek in 2001 which was recorded in AB Kitchen. Their 2003 album Ochena Jibon was the last one to feature founding member S.I. Tutul. They added another guitarist, Abdullah al Masud in the lineup the same year. Their twelfth studio album Sporsho (2007) had included a few heavy metal numbers. In their last two album Juddho (2012) and Rakhe Allah Mare Ke (2016) also had heavy metal numbers and was their first album released in digital platform.

== Studio albums ==
Year	Album	Details
1992	LRB I	Released: 11 June 1992; Label: Sargam Records; Format: Cassette
1992	LRB II	Released: 11 June 1992; Label: Sargam; Format: Cassette
1993	সুখ (Happiness)	Released: 24 June 1993; Label: Soundtek Electronics Limited; Format: Cassette
1994	তবুও (Yet)	Released: 12 January 1994; Label: Sargam; Format: Cassette
1995	ঘুমন্ত শহরে (In the Sleeping City)	Released: 13 July 1995; Label: Soundtek; Format: Cassette
1996	স্বপ্ন (Dream)	Released: 1996; Label: Sangeeta; Format: Cassette
1998	আমাদের? (Ours?)	Released: 1998; Label: Soundtek; Format: Cassette
1998	বিস্ময় (Wonder)	Released: 1998; Label: Soundtek; Format: Cassette
2001	মন চাইলে মন পাবে (If You Want My Heart, You'll Get it)	Released: 2001; Label: AB Kitchen; Format: CD
2003	অচেনা জীবন (Unknown Life)	Released: 2003; Label: AB Kitchen; Format: CD
2005	মনে আছে নাকি নাই? (Do You Remember or Not?)	Released: 2005; Label: Sangeeta; Format: CD
2007	স্পর্শ (Touch)	Released: 2007; Label: BMC; Format: CD
2012	যুদ্ধ (War)	Released: 2012; Label: AB Kitchen; Format: CD, digital download
2016	রাখে আল্লাহ মারে কে? (Allah Keeps, Who Kills?)	Released: 2016; Label: Robi Radio; Format:Digital download

== Live albums ==
Year	Album	Details
1996	Ferari Mon: Unplugged Live	Released: September 15, 1996; Label: Soundtek; Format: Cassette

== Music videos ==
Year	Title	Album
1992	"ফেরারী মন (Mind)"	LRB I
1992	"Madhavi"	LRB I
1993	"চলো বদলে যাই (Let's Change)"	সুখ (Happiness)
1995	"ঘুমন্ত শহরে (In the Sleeping City)"	ঘুমন্ত শহরে (In the Sleeping City)
1996	"এখন অনেক রাত (It's Late at Night)"	Ferari Mon: Unplugged Live
1996	"নীরবে (Quietly)"	Screw Drivers
1996	"আহা জীবন! (Oh, Life!)"	Capsule 500mg
1999	"অন্ধকার মানুষ (Dark People)"	6 Band '99
2001	"মন চাইলে মন পাবে (You'll Get My Heart If You Want it)"	মন চাইলে মন পাবে (You'll Get My Heart If You Want it)
2003	"এক বিকেলের মেয়ে (A Girl From one Afternoon)"	অচেনা জীবন (Unknown Life)
2003	"অচেনা জীবন (Unknown Life)"	অচেনা জীবন (Unknown Life)
2005	"মনে আছে নাকি নাই (Do You Remember, or Not?)"	মনে আছে নাকি নাই (Do You Remember, or Not?)
2005	"বান্দা (Slave)"	মনে আছে নাকি নাই (Do You Remember, or Not?)
2005	"কষ্টটা কম (The Pain is Less)"	মনে আছে নাকি নাই (Do You Remember, or Not?)
2007	"Helena"	স্পর্শ (Touch)
