= Cholo Bodle Jai =

1993 song by Love Runs Blind

"Cholo Bodle Jai (Let's Change)"

Song by LRB

from the album সুখ (Happiness)
- Language: Bangla
- Released: June 24, 1993
- Recorded: 1993
- Studio: Audio Art Studio, Nawabpur Road, Old Dhaka
- Genre: Rock; soft rock
- Length: 5:36 (Original); 07:18 (Unplugged)
- Label: Soundtek
- Songwriter: Ayub Bachchu
- Producer: Ayub Bachchu

"Cholo Bodle Jai" (transl. Let's Change) is a song by the Bangladeshi rock band LRB, released in mid-1993. It was both written and composed by Ayub Bachchu, for the band's third studio album "সুখ (Happiness)". It is often referred to as one of the greatest bangla rock songs.

The song begins with an acoustic guitar and drum. The first verse starts in ten seconds after the intro. The electronic instruments part starts in the chorus line and ends before the second verse. Unlike the other LRB songs, this song has a more mellow and small guitar solo.

The unplugged version was featured in the live album Ferari Mon: Unplugged Live in 1996, and features violin performed by Sunil Chandra Das. "চলো বদলে যাই (Let's Change)" is one of the most popular songs in Bangladesh and one of the best-known song by LRB. The song featured regularly in concerts. Till date, the song has been viewed over 26 million times, and is the most viewed rock song in Bangladesh.

== Writing ==
The recording took place in Audio Art Studio located in Nawabpur Road in Old Dhaka. Bachchu said in an interview with Prothom Alo in January 2016 that:

I don't remember the exact day. I used to live in West Malibagh then. I wrote the song from morning to evening. All of it was written by me. Tuned by me. I wrote a line and tuned it in the guitar. That's how it was made. However, it took a lot of time to record the song. But, only took two days to organize the music.

== Legacy ==
"চলো বদলে যাই (Let's Change)" is considered to be one of the greatest rock song and also one of the most popular rock song in Bangladesh. Maqsoodul Haque of Feedback said in Airtel presents "A Tribute to Ayub Bachchu" in November 2018:

What has he made? That song. It's so popular, it's so great! Wherever you go in Bangladesh, there's always someone who knows this song. It's without a question one of the greatest song of Bangladesh.

Indian brand consultant Roopsha Ray Dasgupta said about the song:

"চলো বদলে যাই (Let's Change)" is not just another song to me. It is a part of my life, my nostalgia. It is the first "Opaar Bangla (Another Side Bengal)" song that left an indelible impression in the mind of a teenager. I would borrow our neighbour's tape recorder and keep listening to it on holidays. I remember rewinding and playing to write the lyrics in the blood-red diary that I maintained.

== Controversy ==
On July 5, 2018, a flute player named Rakibul Islam covered the song in flute and uploaded it on YouTube, which had received well views from fans. Bachchu stated that:

The boy that uploaded the flute version of this song didn't take any permission from us. This is an era of an open sky. Everyone’s taking their chances any way they want.

In 2018, a Pakistani company, named Cross Stitch had copied the tune of the song as their background music, without the permission of LRB. For this, the Pakistani company was criticised in Bangladesh. Bachchu told Prothom Alo that:

I am very proud. Pakistan had to take the refugee from Bangladeshi music. They have lost the power of making a tune.
