= Rokto Golap =

1986 studio album by Ayub Bachchu

রক্ত গোলাপ (Rokto Golap)

Studio album by Ayub Bachchu
- Released: September 22, 1986
- Recorded: June – August 1986
- Studio: Zahed Studio, Johur Hawker Market, Chittagong
- Genre: Rock; pop
- Length: 54:44
- Label: Zahed Electronics
- Producer: Hasan uz Zaman; Zahed Hasan

Ayub Bachchu chronology
রক্ত গোলাপ (Rokto Golap) (1986)	ময়না (Moyna) (1988)

রক্ত গোলাপ (Blood Rose) is the debut studio album by Bangladeshi singer-songwriter Ayub Bachchu, released by Zahed Electronics on 22 September 1986. It was produced by Hasan uz Zaman and Zahed Hasan, the owner of Zahed Electronics. Zaman signed Bachchu to the label in early 1986. The album is a mixture of different genres, like Adhunik bangla music (modern Bangla music), pop music and features only one rock standard song, "অনামিকা (Anamika)". The album doesn't contain any song written by Bachchu.

== Track listing ==
Side A
No.	Title	Lyrics	Length
1.	"রাত কত?" (How Many Nights?)	Hena Islam	5:10
2.	"অনামিকা" (Anamika)	Masum Ferdous	4:41
3.	"চলে যাব একদিন" (One Day I'll Go Away)	S.M. Jongi	5:07
4.	"অলস দুপুরে" (Lazy Day)	Hena	4:39
5.	"রক্ত গোলাপ" (Blood Rose)	Hena	4:58
6.	"মরণ নেশা" (Dying Liquor)	Kazi Salauddin	3:33

Side B
No.	Title	Lyrics	Length
1.	"একদিন দেখা হবে" (One Day I'll Meet You)	Shahin Ahmed	4:45
2.	"দুঃখী" (Sad)	K.S. Sojol	5:14
3.	"সারাঘর জুড়ে" (Throughout the House)	Hena	4:44
4.	"বুকের আগুন" (Chest Fire)	Hena	3:52
5.	"আমার হচ্ছে" (My Being)	Ferdous	3:59
6.	"কবিতার বই" (Poetry Book)	Arif	4:03

== Personnel ==
- Ayub Bachchu - lead vocals, lead guitars and bass guitars
- Ahsan Elahi Funty - drums
- Manam Ahmed - keyboards
- Khayem Pearu - percussion and bass guitars

Lyrics

- Hena Islam - Track 1,4,5 (A) and 3,4 (B)
- Masum Ferdous - Track 2 (A), 4 (B)
- Shahid Mahmud Jangi - Track 3 (A)
- Kazi Salauddin - Track 6 (A)
- Shahin Ahmed - Track 1 (B)
- K.S. Sojol - Track 2 (B)
- Dr. Arif - Track 6 (B)
