= Moyna (album) =

1988 studio album by Ayub Bachchu

ময়না (Moyna)

Studio album by Ayub Bachchu
- Released: 1 December 1988
- Recorded: January – November 1988
- Studio: Sargam Studio, Dhaka University Swimming Pool Area, Dhaka
- Genre: Rock; pop rock; hard rock; classical
- Length: 48:53
- Label: Sargam
- Producer: Ayub Bachchu

Ayub Bachchu chronology
রক্ত গোলাপ (Blood Rose) (1986)	ময়না (Moyna) (1988)	কষ্ট (Sadness) (1995)

ময়না (Moyna) is the second studio album by Bangladeshi singer-songwriter Ayub Bachchu, released on 1 December 1988 by Sargam Records. Despite his lack of success with his debut album "রক্ত গোলাপ (Blood Rose)", this album was both commercially successful and well received by fans. Bachchu got his breakthrough with this album, including hit songs like "ময়না (Moyna)", "শুভ্র ভোরে (Early in the Morning)".

After Bachchu's deal with Zahed Electronics expired, he was signed to Sargam Records in late–1987. The recording sessions started in January and ended in November 1988. It features Bachchu's first lyrics "ও বন্ধু তোমায় (Oh, My Friend)". Unlike his debut album, this album doesn't feature the Adhunik bangla music fusion, but features pop standard song, like the self titled track, Bangladeshi classical standard song, "ওরে কে বলেরে? (Who Said it?)", hard rock standard song, "অনেক রাত্রি (Late at Night)". The album has sold over 60,000 copies in Bangladesh.

== Track listing ==
Side A
No.	Title	Lyrics	Length
1.	"ময়না" (Moyna)	Milon Khan	4:50
2.	"কে বলে?" (Who Says?)	Sojol	4:28
3.	"ও বন্ধু তোমায়" (Oh, My Friend)	Bachchu	6:55
4.	"কাল সারারাত" (Tomorrow, all the Night)	Bokul	4:18
5.	"অনেক রাত্রি" (Late at Night)	Kaiser	3:19

Side B
No.	Title	Lyrics	Length
1.	"মানবতা" (Humanity)	Sojol	3:53
2.	"হাশরের ময়দানে" (In the Field of Hashor)	Zhanu Pagla	3:56
3.	"ট্রেন" (Train)	Shakil	3:52
4.	"ওরে কে বলেরে?" (Who Said It?)	Shakil	3:22
5.	"শুভ্র ভোরে" (Early in the Morning)	Asif Iqbal	6:26
6.	"বৃষ্টির রিমাঝিম" (Rainy Rain)	Jongi	3:34

== Personnel ==
- Ayub Bachchu – lead vocals, lead guitars and bass guitars
- Khayem Ahmed – bass guitars, percussion
- Manam Ahmed – keyboards
- Shawkat Ali Emon – keyboards
- Moksud Jamil Mintu – keyboards
- Ahsan Elahi Fanty – drums

Production

- Panna Azam – recorder
- Ishtiaque Babu – sound engineering
- Bogi Naqib – mixing
