= Subhen Chatterjee =

Indian percussionist and tabla player

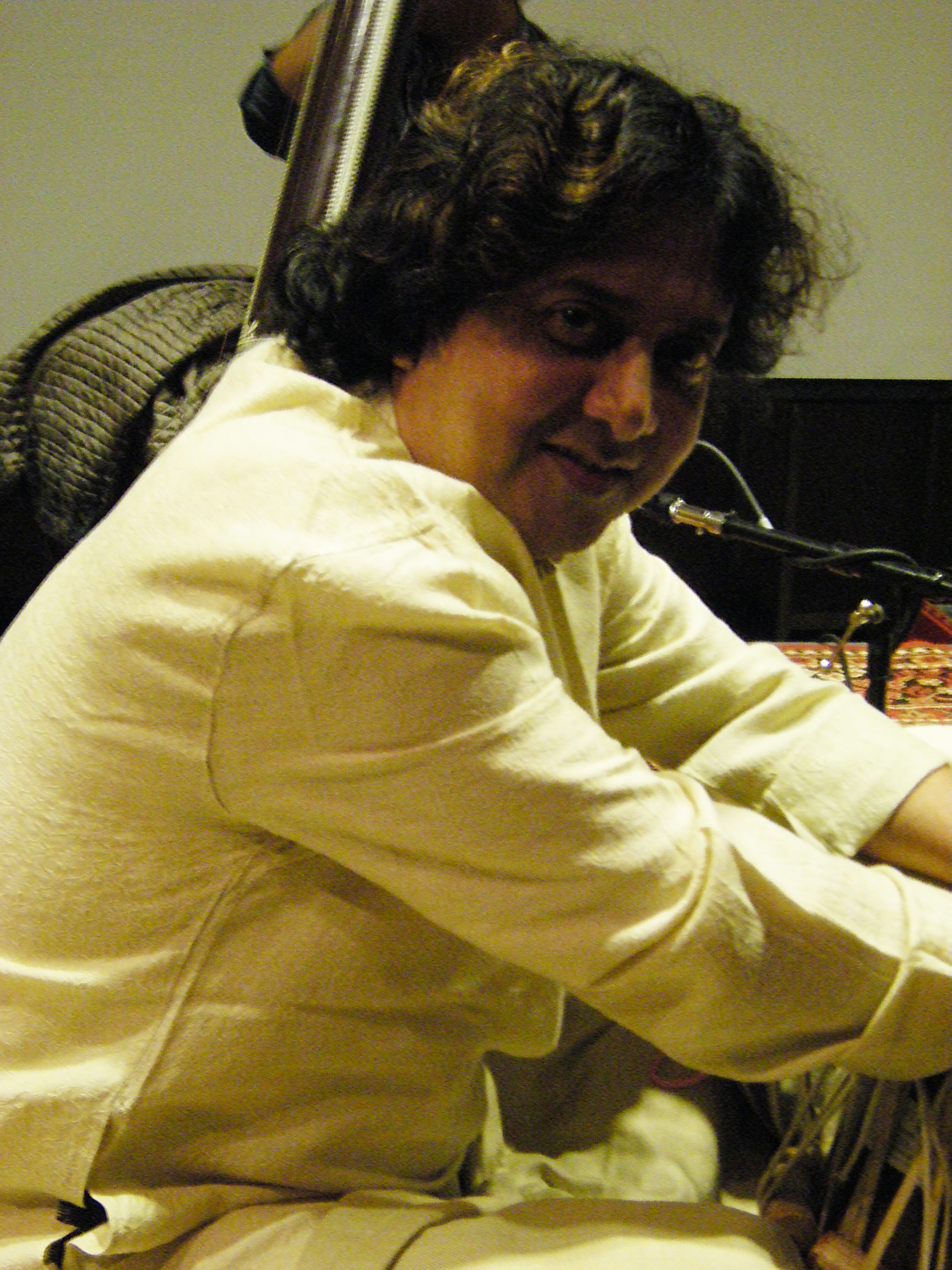
- Subhen Chatterjee performing at Kane Hall, University of Washington, 2008

Background information
- Born: 26 September 1962 (age 64)
- Origin: Kolkata, West Bengal, India
- Genres: Hindustani classical music; Fusion
- Instrument: Tabla
- Years active: 1963–present
- Labels: Saregama, His Master's Voice, Asha Audio, Times Music, Prime Music
- Website: www.subhenchatterjee.net

Subhen Chatterjee is an Indian percussionist and tabla player. Chatterjee began his training on the tabla in his childhood, studying with Swapan Chaudhuri. In 1985 he created the fusion band Karma. He has accompanied the vocalist Girija Devi on several recordings including Songs of Varanasi for Nimbus Records. He has also recorded with V.M. Bhatt and Matt Malley on the album Sleepless Nights for World Village Records.

== Awards and nominations ==
- JUST PLAIN FOLK (JPF) AWARD Nomination for Bandish Fusion album - 2008
- JADU BHATTA AWARD from Salt Lake Music Conference - 2006
- Honorary Citizenship from the State of Alabama (USA) - 2013
- SANGEET SAMMAN AWARD from West Bengal State Govt -2021
- ACHARYA GYAN PROKASH GHOSH AWARD given by Pt.Ajoy Chakraborty' s SHRUTI NANDAN
- PRIDE OF BENGAL AWARD : 2024

== Discography ==
=== With Padmabhushan Smt. Girija Devi ===
- PRATIKSHA [Sagarika]
- SONGS FROM VARANASI [Nimbus Records]
- INDE DU NORD (Live in Paris) [Occura Radio France]
- SPRING MELODY [Mantra Records]
- SAMADHI [Sony BMG]
- With Pt. Vishwa Mohan Bhatt
- MOMENTS ( Dreamz Muzik)
- SLEEPLESS NIGHTS (along with Matt Malley) [Harmonia Mundi]
- BOUQUET OF RAGAS (WITH PT. VISWA MOHAN BHAT [PESHKAR INT'L]
- With Ustad Shahid Parvez
- MORNING GLORY [Biswas Records]
- EMOTIVE SITAR [Biswas Records]
- INTIMATIONS OF GODDESS [Minds of Light]
- DOUBLE CD ( LIVE IN TORONTO ) [India Music Club]
- With Pt. Manilal Nag & Pt. Ramesh Mishra
- ARTISTRY (Sitar & Sarengi duet) [Rhyme Records]

=== With Budhaditya Mukherjee ===
- SITAR [Biswas Records]
- MAGIC MOMENTS [Sapphire Records]

=== With Pt. Manilal Nag & Ustad Ali Ahmed Hussain (Sitar & Sehnai Duet) ===
- MUSIC FROM MAESTROS [Biswas Records]
- JUGALBANDI [Rhyme Records]
- SHEHNAI [B M G Records]

=== With KARMA - the fusion band ===
- BANDISH FUSION: the lasting legacy [Saregama]
- BANDISH FUSION: Redefind [Saregama]
- BANDISH FUSION [Prime Music]
- SECULAR MINDS [Plus Music]
- BASICALLY YOURS [Megaphone Records]
- BEYOND LIMIT [On Air Communications]

=== With Snehashish Mazumder (Mandolin) ===
- ECLECTIC TRIO ( with Pt. Rupak Kulkarni ) ( Dreamz Muzik )
- MANDOLIN DREAMS [World Music Records]
- RAINBOW [Neelam Records]

=== With Dr. Rajeeb Chakraborty ===
- TRILOGY ( with Mr. Jesse Bannister ) ( Dreamz Muzik )
- BLACK & WHITE (RAJEEB & REENA: Sarode - Sitar duet) [On Air Communications]
- SEASONS (with Rajeeb) [Rhyme Records]
- CROSSWINDS (RAJEEB & JESSE BANNISTER: Sarode - Saxophone duet) [On Air Communications]
- RAJEEB & REENA (Sarode - Sitar duet) [Neelam Records]

With Others

- DESERT ROOTS ( with The Langa Manganiyars of Rajasthan ) (Dreamz Muzik )
- BAUL EXPRESS ( with The Bauls of Bengal ) ( Dreamz Muzik )
- BLISS (Tabla Solo) [M2 Records]
- EMOTIVE SARENGI (Pt. Ramesh Misra) [M2 Records]
- SADHANA (Pt. Rajan & Sajan Misra- vocal duet) [PESHKAR INT'L]
- LAGUK HAWA (With Rejwana Chowdhury Bonnya - An album on Rabindra Sangeet as World Music) [Saregama]
