= Fossils (band) =

Indian hard rock band

Fossils ফসিল্‌স
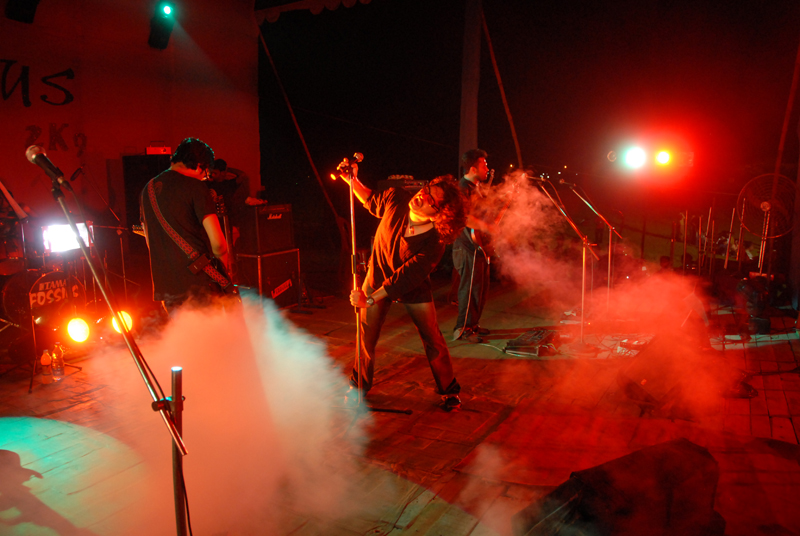
- Fossils performing in 2009

Background information
- Origin: Kolkata, West Bengal, India
- Genre: Bangla Rock
- Years active: 1998–present
- Labels: Asha Audio; Bangla Rock
- Members: Rupam Islam; Deep Ghosh; Allan Temjen Ao; Prasenjit 'Pom' Chakraborty; Tanmoy Das
- Past members: Chandramouli Biswas; Partha; Bubun; Stephen; Indrajit Dey Indro
- Website: fossilsmusic.in

Fossils (ফসিল্‌স) is an Indian hard rock band from Bengal formed in Kolkata, West Bengal, India, in 1998. The group is considered one of the pioneering rock acts in Kolkata's Bengali music scene. The band currently comprises Rupam Islam (lead vocals, additional guitars), Deep Ghosh (rhythm guitar), Allan Temjen Ao (lead guitar), Tanmoy Das (drums), Prasenjit 'Pom' Chakraborty (bass guitar)

Their music is flavoured by a blend of blues, rock and psychedelia, hard rock along with Rupam Islam's vocal renditions of his characteristic psychoanalytical lyrics. They are noted for their social commentary and advocation of causes such as the welfare of HIV-positive people.

== History ==
=== 1998–2000: Formation and early years ===
The band was formed by Rupam Islam. Their first stage show was held on 9 January 1999 at Najrul Mancha for Gaan 99 organised by His Master's Voice. While performing on stage as "Rupam Islam and group," Rupam announced the band's new name, Fossils. This initial show had Deep on acoustic guitar, Deep Ghosh on guitars, Tanmoy on bass, and Rajiv on drums. This line-up was short lived however, and the next show saw Chandra and Teno on guitars, Baji on drums, Bumpy on bass, Jatu on keyboards and Rupam.

The group started to call themselves "Fossils" after a suggestion by their guitarist Deep. The name is inspired by a line from one of Rupam's lyrics: "Khoro aamar fossil, onubhutir michhil protikriashil kono biplobe" (lit. ''Dig up my fossil, a procession of emotions, in a reactionary revolution'').

The initial audience reaction to the band's music was negative. During their first few shows, they were met with jeering and hostility because of their rock style and techniques. The band went through line-up changes until the end of 1999, by which time a sort of permanency was achieved with Rupam (vocals), Chandra (bass), Allan (guitar), Deep (Rhythm Guitar), Stephen (drums), Indra (keyboards), and Parikhshit (manager) as the members.

=== 2000–2003: Fossils ===
In 2000, the band recorded a demo version of their tracks. They faced rejection several times from different record houses. In 2001, the guitarist Allan left the band. Former members Teno and Deep re-joined in Allan's stead. A contract was landed with Asha Audio and by the end of the same year, recording for the band's first studio album began. The album was titled Fossils and released in 2002. Teno left the band in 2002, and was replaced by Partha. In 2003, the drummer Stephen was replaced by Bubun.

=== 2004–2005: Fossils 2 ===
The band's second album, entitled Fossils 2, was released in 2004. In 2005, the manager Parikshit was expelled from the band; Rupam and Deep jointly took over his work. As of 2007, management has been handled by Deep and Rupam's wife Rupsha Dasgupta.

=== 2006: Mission F ===
The band's third studio album, entitled Mission F, was released in 2006. It was a theme album for the first Kolkata Police Friendship Cup Football Tournament. A special track, "Aeka Nauo", dedicated to HIV positive people, was included in the album. It featured Usha Uthup and was produced in collaboration with the Kolkata Sukriti Foundation. A free VCD distributed with the album contains the music video for the track, which shows HIV positive people with their faces uncovered interacting freely with Uthup and the band members. The VCD also contained a chat session with band members.

Radio Mirchi collaborated with the band to produce two "unplugged" versions of previously recorded tracks that were included in the album. According to a survey conducted by Radio Mirchi, Mission F was declared the best-selling album in Kolkata for the year 2006. On Earth Day, the band covered Michael Jackson's Earth Song in Bengali exclusively for the news channel CNN IBN.

=== 2007: Apodaartho ===
In the first half of 2007, Rupam Islam worked on a separate project named RnB with the bassist Bumpy. In the second half of 2007, the band released a music video album entitled Apodaartho. The album was scheduled to be launched in Music World, Park Street, Kolkata. The crowd turnout was so unexpectedly huge that fans had to be turned out, and the outlet's premises were closed. The police had a tough time controlling the crowd. The release did take place on the same day.

During the Pujas of 2007, Rupam Islam's 1998 solo album was re-launched by Saregama. On 9 November, Fossils played live for the first time in Bangladesh at the Dhaka Rock Fest 2007, the first international Bengali rock festival.

=== 2008–2013: Fossils 3 ===
Fossils featured in the Rolling Stone India magazine in 2008. The end of 2008 saw Fossils begin the recording of their fifth studio album, which was released on 19 September 2009. It was titled Fossils 3 and developed as a concept album. It endeavours to tell the story of a mysterious character known only as Shada Jama (White Shirt) through the interlinked audio tracks as well as a separate graphic account contained in the inlay cards. Mayookh Bhowmick on the distortion tabla, Indrajit Dey (Indra) on the keyboards, and a team from the Kolkata Music Academy Chamber Orchestra led by Abraham Mazumder were the guest contributors to the album. Fossils 3 would go on to win in the Best Non-Film Album category of the Anandalok Awards 2009.

The year 2009 marked the band's tenth anniversary. The band's official fan club, Fossils Force, was launched the same year, which started their operations through a blood donation camp on 1 May 2009. They continue to engage in activities for social welfare, such as contributing to the relief of people affected by the Cyclone Aila and another blood donation camp in 2010. Rupam on the Rocks, written by Rupam Islam and published by Ananda Publishers was launched at the Kolkata Book Fair 2009. The same year saw Fossils touring the UK and Bangalore. The year 2010 started with a change in the line-up. Bubun was replaced by Tanmoy on the drums.

In July 2010, the band played live at Nashville in the United States. Due to the venue restrictions their performance was cut short. But owing huge demands they took to the stage the next day. Later in the year, Rupam Islam won a National Film Award (Silver Lotus or Rajat Kamal) in the Best Male Playback Singer category from the Government of India for his work in the film Mahanagar @ Kolkata. June 2011, Allan rejoined the band in place of Partha. September 2011, Fossils visited Dhaka, Bangladesh for the third time.

=== 2014: Fossils 4 ===
The sixth studio album of the band was released on 19 October 2013 at City Centre II, Rajarhat – Kolkata. For the first time, the band soft-launched Fossils 4 as a full-length digital album available for streaming days before the physical release of the album.

=== 2017: Fossils 5 ===
Their 7th Studio album Fossils 5 was released on 8 December 2017. It included 4 songs & 3 of them were released with Music videos. The music videos were directed by renowned director Samik Roy Choudhury.

=== 2019: Fossils 6 ===
Their latest album, Fossils 6 was released in 2019. The album contains 3 songs & was mixed & mastered by famous Producer Miti Adhikari who worked with Nirvana and Pearl Jam. This was the last album in which the band's Bassist Chandramouli Biswas contributed. In 2018, Bassist Chandramouli Biswas left the band because of health issues. Chandramouli was known for his iconic basslines & his stage presence. he quickly developed a fan following among the audience. He was replaced by Prasenjit 'pom' Chakrabutty on bass who was previously their recording engineer.

=== 2020–present ===
On 9 January 2023, the band celebrated their 25th anniversary by organising a concert, Fossils Panchabingshoti. It was held in south Kolkata, and the audience was 7,000-plus. On 12 January 2025, the former bassist Chandramouli Biswas died by suicide. In September 2025, Fossils started their North America Tour in Toronto followed by 5 other venues from USA and Canada.

== Discography ==
- Fossils (2002)
  - Aaro Ekbaar
  - Eklaa Ghar
  - Nemesis
  - Haasnuhaanaa
  - Dekho Maanosii
  - Bishaakto Maanush
  - Niskromon
  - Millennium
- Fossils 2 (2004)
  - Keno Korle
  - Maanob Bomaa
  - Chhaal
  - Haaraano Padok
  - Tritiiyo Bishwo
  - Acid
  - Untrishe October
  - Bicycle Chor
  - Shaasti
- Mission F (2006)
  - Itostato
  - Satotaar Bilaasitaa
  - Maanob Bomaa (Unplugged)
  - Friendship Chaai
  - Bondhu He
  - Kichhutaa Somay
  - Bishaakto Maanush (Unplugged)
  - Ekaa Nao
  - Shono, Aamraa Ki Sabaai?
  - Haari Naa
- Apodaartho (2007)
  - Apodaartho [Video Album]
- Fossils 3 (2009)
  - Swaabhaabik Khun
  - Maa
  - Daanober Utthaan
  - Guru
  - Phire Chalo
  - Bidroher Paandulipi
  - Mummy
  - Bhuut aar Tilottamaa 1
  - Dhwangsho Romanthon
  - Haaspaataale
  - Mrityu: Mrityur Pare
  - Rail Line-e Mrityu
  - Schizophrenic Bra
  - Bhuut aar Tilottamaa 2
- Fossils 4 (2013)
  - Khnoro Aamaar Fossil
  - Bnaador
  - Haajaar Bichhaanaa
  - Mahaakaash
  - Baari Eso
  - Shaytaan
  - Resolutions
  - Sthaabor/Asthaabor
  - Mrityu
- Fossils 5 (2017)
  - Jaanlaa
  - Stabdho Jiibon
  - Mrito Maanush
  - Paalaao
- Fossils 6 (2019)
  - Ghrinaa
  - Hriday Bhaangbaar Gaan
  - Dewali Pee
- Fossils 7 (2026)
  - Khudhaarto Maangsaashii
  - Long Drive-e, Wrong Drive-e
  - Aporibortito
  - Jodi Tumi
  - Obhinay
  - Shunechhi

== See also ==
- Rupam Islam
- Music of India
- Indian Rock
