= Jibon =

Jibon is a surname and a given name. Notable people with the name include:

Surname:

- Nabib Newaj Jibon (born 1990), Bangladeshi professional footballer
- Robiul Islam Jibon, Bangladeshi lyricist and journalist

Given name:

- Jyoti Jibon Ghosh (1910–1968), Indian revolutionary and member of the Bengal Volunteers
- Nirmal Jibon Ghosh (1916–1934), Indian revolutionary and member of the Bengal Volunteers
- Jibon Rahman (1964–2020), Bangladeshi film director
- Jibon Singh, Indian footballer
