= Love Runs Blind =

Bangladeshi rock band

Love Runs Blind লাভ রান্‌স ব্লাইন্ড
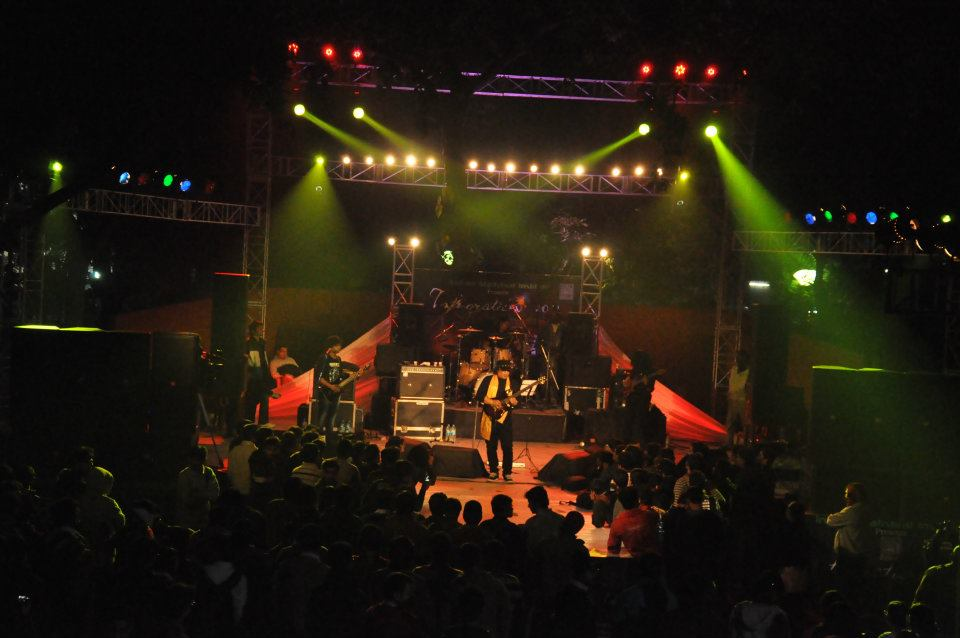
- LRB performing live at Integration in 2012.

Background information
- Also known as: Little River Band (1991–1997)
- Origin: Bangladesh
- Genres: Hard rock; pop rock
- Years active: 1991–2018
- Label: AB Kitchen
- Past members: Ayub Bachchu; Saidul Hasan Swapan; S.I. Tutul; Habib Anwar Joy; Milton Akbar; Riaydh Sarwar; Sumon; Abdullah Al Masud; Golamur Rahman Romel; Arif Shishir
- Website: ablrb.net (see: archived version at the Wayback Machine) abkitchen.org

Love Runs Blind was a Bangladeshi rock band formed in Chittagong by Ayub Bachchu from 5 April 1991 until 18 October 2018.

Since their formation, they have released thirteen studio albums, one live album and two compilation albums. They toured the US, and were the only Bangladeshi rock band to play Madison Square Gardens in New York.

After signing with Sargam Records, LRB released the first double album in Bangladesh, LRB I and LRB II in 1992. Their 3rd album সুখ (Happiness) (1993) helped them to get more commercial success in the country and featured the song "চলো বদলে যাই (Let's Change)", which is one of the most popular rock songs in Bangladesh. Their popularity continued with hit albums like তবুও (Yet) (1994) and ঘুমন্ত শহরে (In the Sleeping City) (1995). In September 1996, they released Ferari Mon: Unplugged Live, which was the first live album in Bangladesh. They are the only Bangladeshi band to perform in the Madison Square Garden, New York. They rose to mainstream fame in the early 1990s and is part of "Big Three of Rock" along with Ark and Nagar Baul, who were responsible for popularizing hard rock music in Bangladesh in the 1990s. On 18 October 2018, lead singer and lead guitarist of the band Ayub Bachchu, died of cardiac failure in his own residence. Bachchu gave his last performance in Rangpur, Bangladesh, two days before his death.

LRB is considered to be one of the most influential and successful rock bands of Bangladesh. The Top Tens ranked them number 4 on their list of "Top 10 Rock Bands of Bangladesh". They have won a record six Meril Prothom Alo Awards and a Citycell-Channel I Music Award in 2007.

== History ==
=== Early Years, L.R.B. I and L.R.B. II (1990–1992) ===
Ayub Bachchu formed the band LRB, which stood for Little River Band. But, after Bachchu found out that an Australian rock band had the same name, he changed it to Love Runs Blind in 1997. LRB were invited to perform in a concert in University of Dhaka arranged by BAMBA on 26 April 1991 along with other rock bands like Souls, Feelings, Ark and many other bands.

In their early days they used to play live shows in Hotel Sheraton and Chambeeli Super Club along with bands like Ark and Feedback. In early 1991, they signed a deal with Sargam and went on to record their albums LRB I and LRB II, which was the first double album in Bangladesh. The album was released in Cassette format. It included one of the greatest hit songs of LRB "ঘুম ভাঙ্গা শহরে (In the Woke Up City)" which was the first released song of LRB as a band and this song was a super hit overnight all over Bangladesh, "ঘুম ভাঙ্গা শহরে (In the Woke Up City)" was a pioneering track in Early-90s Bangla Hard Rock. and the song was written by legendary lyricist Shahid Mahmud Jangi. The albums also include songs like "ঢাকার সন্ধ্যা (Evening of Dhaka)", "হকার (Hawker)", "মা (Mother)" and "এক কাপ চা (A Cup of Tea)".

=== "সুখ (Happiness)" and "তবুও (Yet)" (1993–1994) ===
After the release of their double albums, they signed a new contract with Soundtek in mid-1992 and quickly started to work on their third album সুখ (Happiness). The album came out in 1993. It was the band's first album to get commercial success. With the power ballad "চলো বদলে যাই (Let's Change)" becoming the most popular rock song of the year, they became one of the best bands of that era. The song became their signature song. The album also included hard rock song "গতকাল রাতে (Last Night)" and "রুপালী গিটার (Silver Guitar)". After the release of সুখ (Happiness), drummer Habib Anwar Joy left the band for Ark. On 8 June 1993, Milton Akbar joined the band as their new drummer. In 1994, they released their fourth studio album তবুও (Yet) from Sargam Records. It included the hit song "রাত জাগা পাখি (Night Bird)". Though the album was not as successful as the previous album, it cemented their hard rock status. In January 1994, drummer Milton Akbar left the band and was replaced by Riyad on 31 January 1994.

=== Death of Ayub Bachchu and tribute concert (2018–present) ===
In 2012, Ayub Bachchu was admitted to the CCU Hospital in Dhaka for the accretion of water in his lungs. He recovered after receiving treatment. On 18 October 2018, he died from cardiac failure at his own residence. He was declared dead at Square Hospital at 9:55 a.m. He was laid to rest in Chittagong City beside his mother's grave.

After his death his bandmates and other musicians in the country held a concert named "Tribute to Ayub Bachchu" which was produced by BAMBA, where many bands performed songs of LRB. A tribute concert in Kolkata was held on 24 November 2018, title "আইয়ুব বাচ্চুর স্মরণে দুই বাংলার রকবাজি (In Memoriam of Ayub Bachchu, the Rocking of Two Bangla)" where many Indian artists performed songs of LRB.

== Musical style ==
LRB is a hard rock band, whose music has often been described as blues rock, soft rock, psychedelic rock. The band has been cited as one of the pioneering heavy metal band in Bangladesh. Early on LRB were influenced by the Jimi Hendrix Experience, Deep Purple, Led Zeppelin and Dire Straits. Ayub Bachchu stated in an interview that Jimi Hendrix and Joe Satriani were his main influences. On the back sleeve of their album, LRB II, Bachchu said that:

LRB is disenchanted in cheap popularity. Whatever the language of the song is or from what country it's from, music is for everyone. That's why we've composed this two cassette's about the world around us. If any of these two cassette touches the heart of a good listener, we will find the satisfaction of all our hard work. LRB makes music for those people who loves to listen to good music and takes the problems around them as their own problem.

The 1990s albums of LRB were mostly hard rock, pop rock and blues rock. But, from their 2007 studio album "স্পর্শ (Touch)" they have released many heavy metal tracks. Since, Abdullah al Masud joined in 2003, LRB was making more heavier sound as there were two guitarist. Their last two studio albums, "যুদ্ধ (War)" (2012) and "রাখে আল্লাহ মারে কে (Allah Keeps, Who Kills)" (2016) mostly consisted heavy metal numbers.

== Tours ==
LRB has performed over 1,000 gigs that have included extensive performances in Bangladesh as well as tours in Asia, Europe, and the United States. Their first show outside country was held in India in 1997 at Jadavpur University, where LRB was to perform. But the organisers were a little bit doubtful about the quality of the band. After their performance they request LRB to act as a judge which Ayub Bachchu agreed to comply with. In 1998, LRB went for their first international tour in United States, where they played in seven states. In 1998, the group also played in Qatar, Abu Dhabi, Japan, Germany, Austria, and Italy. The group played a second tour in the United States in 2000. The group had a European tour in 2002, which included Austria, the United Kingdom, and Australia. In 2005 and 2006, LRB performed in Salt Lake Stadium, Science City Theater, Alpha Bangla, ETV Bangla, Najrul Manch, Rabindra Shorobor, Guru Nanak University (Jodhpur), Haldia Utshab, Durgapur University, Kalyani, Govt Engineer College in the fest "EXOTICA '08", and recently at NRS Medical College and Hospital, Kolkata in their college fest "ECSTASY 2013". LRB has performed in Madison Square Garden in New York City.

LRB also has used its music to support social causes in conjunction with other Bengali rock groups. Recently, they performed in support of children endangered by the recent Tsunami and Sidr. Also, they have performed in support of campaigns to "Say No to Drugs", "Save Motherhood", and "Victims Against Non-violence". In 1998 Ayub bachchu released a solo album "বাঁচাও বিধাতা (Save Me God)" for the aid of the flood-stricken people of the country.

== Discography ==
Studio albums

- L.R.B I (1992)
- L.R.B II (1992)
- সুখ (Happiness) (1993)
- তবুও (Yet) (1994)
- Chomok (1994) - EP
- ঘুমন্ত শহরে (In the Sleeping City) (1995)
- Capsule 500mg (1995) - EP
- Screw Driver (1996) - EP
- "স্বপ্ন (Dream)" (1996)
- ফেরারী মন: Unplugged Live (1996)
- Dhun (1998) - EP
- আমাদের? (Ours?) (1998)
- বিস্ময় (Wonder) (1998)
- মন চাইলে মন পাবে (If You Want My Heart, You'll Get it) (2000)
- অচেনা জীবন (Unknown Life) (2003)
- মনে আছে নাকি নাই (Do You Remember, or Not) (2005)
- স্পর্শ (Touch) (2008)
- যুদ্ধ (War) (2012)
- রাখে আল্লাহ মারে কে (Allah Keeps, Who Kills) (2016)

== Awards ==
Meril Prothom Alo Awards

Year	Nominee / work	Award	Result
1998	Love Runs Blind	Best Band of the Year	Won
1999	Love Runs Blind	Best Band of the Year	Won
2000	Love Runs Blind	Best Band of the Year	Won
2001	মন চাইলে মন পাবে (If You Want My Heart, You'll Get it)	Best Band Album of the Year	Won
2005	Love Runs Blind	Best Band of the Year	Won
2007	স্পর্শ (Touch)	Best Band Album of the Year	Won
2009	Bolini Tomai	Best Male Vocal of the Year	Nominated

Citycell-Channel I Music Awards

Year	Nominee / work	Award	Result
2007	স্পর্শ (Touch)	Album of the Year	Won

== Members ==
- Ayub Bachchu (died 2018) — vocals, lead guitars (1991–2018)
- Saidul Hasan Swapan — bass guitar (1991–2018)
- S.I. Tutul — vocals, keyboards (1991–2003)
- Habib Anwar Joy — drums (1991–1993)
- Milton Akbar — drums (1994–1995)
- Riaydh Sarwar - drums (1995–2006)
- Sumon — drums (2003–2006)
- Abdullah Al Masud — guitars (2003–2018)
- Golamur Rahman Romel — drums (2006–2015; 2016–2018)
- Arif Shishir — drums (2015–2016)

== See also ==
- Rock music of Bangladesh
- Love Runs Blind discography
