= Sabbir Nasir =

Bangladeshi business executive and singer-songwriter

- সাব্বির নাসির
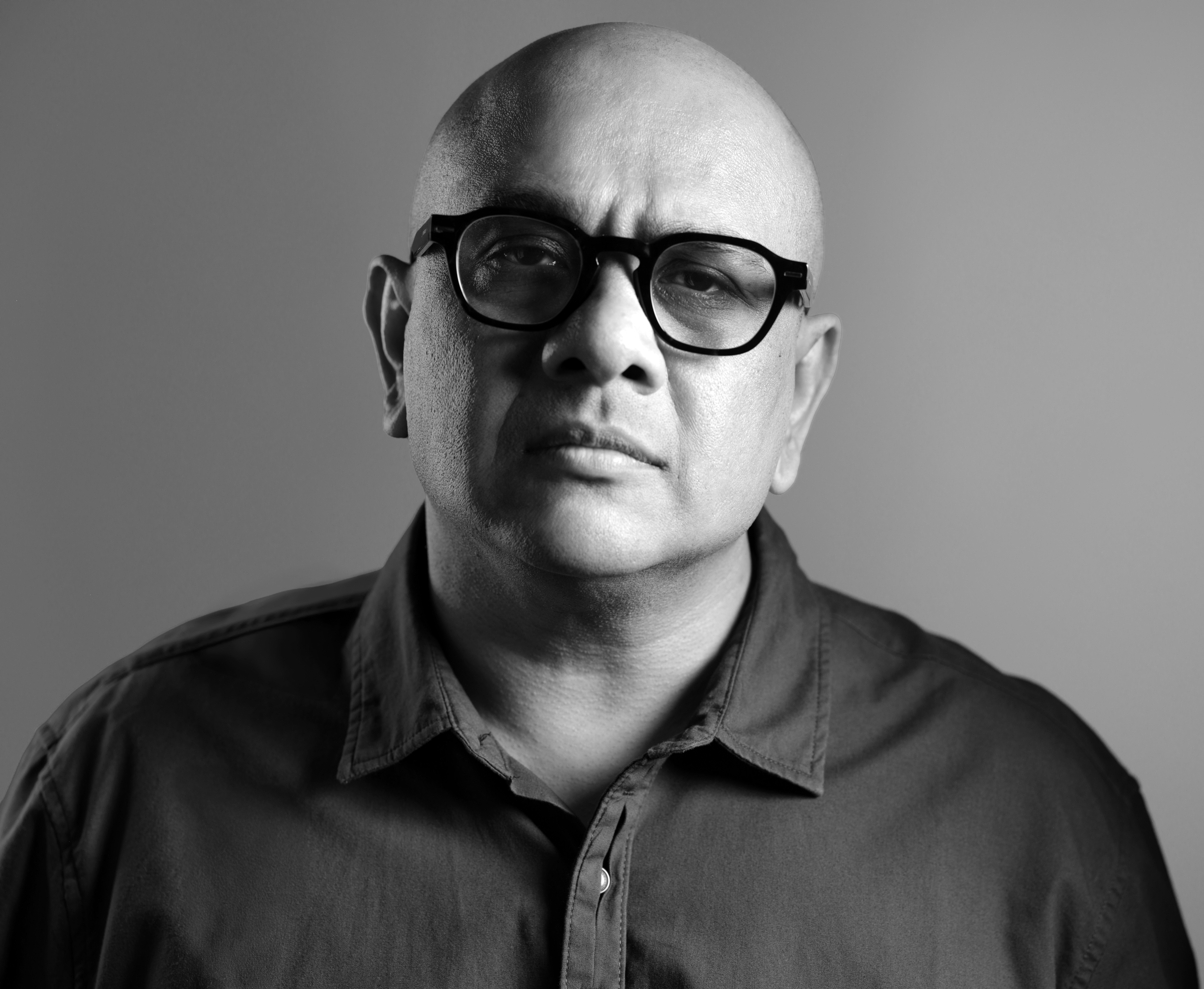
- Nasir in 2025
- Born: Sabbir Hasan Nasir; 24 October 1972 (age 54); Khulna, Bangladesh
- Education: Bangladesh University of Engineering and Technology; University of Dhaka; MIT Sloan School of Management; UC Berkeley Haas School of Business
- Occupations: Singer, songwriter, composer, entrepreneur
- Years active: 1987–present

Sabbir Hasan Nasir (born 24 October 1972) is a Bangladeshi business executive, entrepreneur, author, and musician. He is the Managing Director of ACI Logistics Limited, the operator of Shwapno, one of Bangladesh’s largest grocery retail chains. Nasir is known for leading Shwapno’s transformation from a loss-making retail chain into a franchise-led national retail platform,with media reports citing more than 1,000 outlets, eight consecutive years of positive EBITDA, three years of positive operating profit, a 20 fold increase in store network, and 14-fold sales growth. His work has also included food safety, GLOBALG.A.P. certified sourcing, inclusive employment, sustainability initiatives, and business model innovation. He is associated with Novastra Global Partners LLC, a Florida-based advisory company focused on business transformation and investor-readiness. In addition to his business career, Nasir is active as a singer, composer, and songwriter, working in genres including folk fusion, indie pop, and blues.

== Early life and education ==
Nasir was born and raised in Khulna, Bangladesh. He studied at Saint Joseph High School, Khulna, and later completed a Bachelor of Science in Mechanical Engineering from the Bangladesh University of Engineering and Technology. He also completed an MBA from the Institute of Business Administration, University of Dhaka. He later attended executive education programs at institutions including MIT Sloan School of Management and the University of California, Berkeley. ACI Limited’s announcement of his appointment as Managing Director of Shwapno described him as having more than 28 years of professional experience locally and internationally.

== Career ==
=== Business career ===
Nasir began his professional career at Bata Shoe Company. He later worked in Bangladesh and overseas in roles connected with manufacturing, distribution, sales, marketing, and operations. His career included positions at Golfrate H & PC Limited in Angola and Tetra Pak South East Asia Private Limited before he joined the Bangladeshi furniture company OTOBI as Chief Executive Officer.

=== OTOBI ===
From 2006 to 2011, Nasir was Chief Executive Officer of Otobi Limited, a Bangladeshi furniture manufacturer and retailer. During his tenure, media and company reports described Otobi as undergoing rapid organizational and commercial expansion. Reports stated that the company’s annual revenue increased from approximately ৳150 crore to ৳550 crore, while its retail and distribution network expanded nationwide through showrooms, dealers, and franchise outlets.

During this period, the company introduced new retail formats, category management systems, and visual merchandising practices. Performance management frameworks, including the Balanced Scorecard, were also adopted.

The company expanded its manufacturing capacity through the establishment of a wood manufacturing facility and extended its product range to include office and lifestyle lines. Workforce size increased during these years, alongside developments in branding, customer research, and supply chain operations.

Nasir's tenure at Otobi has been referenced in Bangladeshi business publications in the context of corporate transformation and the development of organized retail in the furniture sector.

=== ACI ===
Nasir joined ACI Logistics Limited, the operator of Shwapno, in 2012 as Executive Director. In May 2024, ACI Limited announced his appointment as Managing Director of Shwapno. The Financial Express reported that Nasir joined ACI in 2012 and that under his leadership Shwapno became a leading retail brand and household name in Bangladesh.

Shwapno’s transformation under Nasir has been widely covered in Bangladeshi business media. The Business Standard reported in 2025 that Shwapno had grown into Bangladesh’s largest grocery retailer, operating more than 750 stores nationwide, with eight consecutive years of positive EBITDA and three years of positive operating profit. The same report stated that Shwapno’s network had grown 20 times and its sales had multiplied 14-fold. In August 2026, The Business Standard reported that Shwapno had expanded its nationwide network to 1,001 outlets, becoming the first retail chain in Bangladesh's supershop sector to cross the 1,000 outlet mark. The Daily Star similarly described Shwapno’s reinvention from a struggling retail chain into a market leader, reporting that the company had posted positive EBITDA for eight consecutive years after earlier years of heavy losses.

Earlier reports also documented the company’s move toward operating profitability. In 2021, The Business Standard reported that Shwapno had begun enjoying operating profits for the first time in its decade-long journey.

=== Franchise model and business model innovation ===
One of the major elements of Shwapno’s growth under Nasir was the development of a franchise-led retail model. Shwapno launched its franchise model in 2017–18 with six outlets.

The Financial Express later reported that the model had become the primary growth engine for ACI Logistics, with more than 400 of Shwapno’s 500-plus outlets operating as franchises. The report stated that the franchise model generated 2–3% net profit on sales and positioned Shwapno as a pioneer in retail innovation.

According to The Business Standard, the model allowed Shwapno to serve both the growth needs of the retail brand and the investment interests of small and medium-sized businesspeople across Bangladesh.

=== Food safety, responsible sourcing and GLOBALG.A.P. ===
Nasir’s work at Shwapno also included food-safety and responsible-sourcing initiatives. In 2022, Shwapno received GLOBALG.A.P. certification. The Business Standard reported that Shwapno received the certificate after a multi-step audit process and that seven products were certified. The certification reflected Shwapno’s work with farmers, USAID, and GLOBALG.A.P. to improve food-safety standards.

The Daily Star and New Age also reported that Shwapno became the first GLOBALG.A.P.-certified retailer in South-East Asia.

Dhaka Tribune reported that Shwapno had begun working with farmers in Jessore in 2018 to produce vegetables under good agricultural practice regulations, and that USAID representatives visited certified farms connected with Shwapno’s GLOBALG.A.P. work.

=== Workforce inclusion and social impact ===
Shwapno has also introduced workforce inclusion initiatives for people with special needs. The Financial Express reported in 2020 that Shwapno had fixed a target of 10% of its workforce for workers with special needs. The report linked the initiative to Nasir’s leadership and stated that Shwapno had recruited employees with disabilities and neurodevelopmental conditions, including individuals on the autism spectrum.

=== Sustainability ===
Shwapno has also been involved in sustainability initiatives. In 2024, The Business Standard reported that Shwapno introduced jute bags as an eco-friendly alternative to plastic bags following the government’s decision to ban plastic bags in supermarkets. The initiative was publicly praised by the adviser to the Ministry of Textiles and Jute. Shwapno is also a cited member of the United Nations Global Compact.

=== Novastra Global Partners ===
Nasir is associated with Novastra Global Partners LLC, a Florida-based advisory company. Florida Division of Corporations records list Novastra Global Partners LLC as an active Florida limited liability company registered in Tampa, with Sabbir Hasan Nasir listed as chief executive officer.

=== Mitsui partnership and institutional investment ===
In 2026, Mitsui & Co.. announced a convertible loan agreement with ACI Logistics Limited. Mitsui stated that the partnership aimed to support Shwapno’s growth and business transformation through operational collaboration, governance forums, and access to Mitsui know-how. Mitsui’s company profile for ACI Logistics listed Sabbir Hasan Nasir as Managing Director.

This partnership connected Shwapno’s operating transformation with institutional investor interest and supported the company’s ambition to expand further as a retail platform.

=== Recognition and awards ===
Under Nasir’s leadership, Shwapno received several brand, marketing, and retail awards. These include Best Brand recognition in the superstore category, Superbrands recognition, and marketing awards connected with Shwapno’s campaigns.

=== Music career ===
He started performing on stage at the age of 16. He was the vocalist and the lead guitarist of different bands. His last band, Metamorphosis published their first and last album in 1998. From 1998 to 2018, Sabbir was out of the musical scene.

Nasir resumed singing again in 2018. Some of his folk and blues songs became popular among Bangladeshi and Indian audiences. Some of his top Folk singles are "Binodini Rai" which is a duet song, sung along with Sampa Biswas from India, "Amare Dia Dilam Tomare", "Tumi Dome Dom" etc. He got CJFB Award in 2020 for his Single "Horsho". He was recognized with Safekeeper Channel i Digital Award in 2021 for his song "Amare Dia Dilam Tomare". In 2021, for his single "Adha" he won the bronze award in the Male singer category at the Global Music Awards program, organised by a California-based organisation. His first English single "Drowning" was featured in various international magazines.

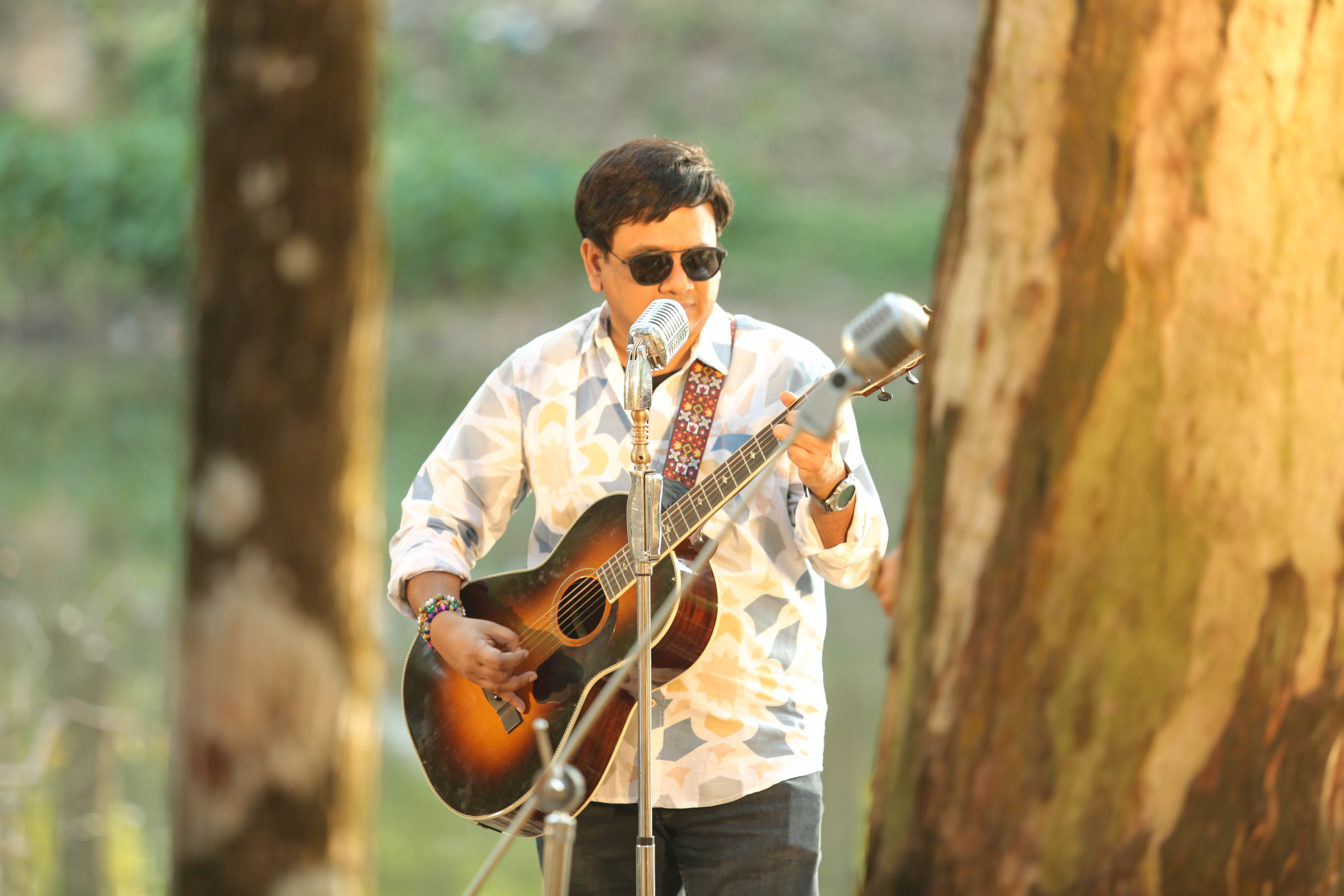
Sabbir Hasan Nasir in 2019

He sang in the Playback in different films e.g. at "Daymukti" with Konal at Pritilota movie etc. This movie about the life of Pritilata Waddedar. "Binodini Rai" sung by Sabbir Nasir and Kolkata-based singer Shampa Biswas broke all records on social media platforms with more than one crore views.

== Awards ==
- CJFB Award- 2020
- Safekeeper Channel i Digital Award – 2021
- Global Music Awards – 2021– (Bronze award winner)
- Babisas Award 2022
- Oikko Channel i Music Awards 2022
- BCRA Best Folk Singer Award 2022
- Channel i Music Awards 2024

== Discography ==
Year of release	Song name	Lyrics	Composition	Co-artist	Music Video directed by	Genre	References
2019	Fagun Ashche	Tahmina Parveen	Muntasir Tusher	Nasrin Nasha	S.M. Fazle Rabbi	Pop	
2019	Tomar Hobo Bole	Abu Sayem Chowdhury	Shafiq Tuhin		Shuvabrata Sarker	Soft rock	
2019	Baishakhi Mela	Rajib Hasan	Muntasir Tusher	Oyshee	S.M. Fazle Rabby	Pop	
2019	Jolo Jochona	Rajib Hasan	Muntasir Tusher	Jessia Islam	Fahin Arafin Evan	Soft rock	
2020	Chayader Ghum	Shahan Kabondho	Golam Raabbi Shohag		Joy Mahmud	Pop	
2020	Horsho	Rajib Hasan	Muntasir Tusher	Safa Kabir	Amitabh Reza Chowdhury	Soft rock	
2020	Tumi Dome Dom	Omar Faruk Bishal	Omar Faruk Bishal		Shahrear Polock	Folk	
2020	Amare Dia Dilam Tomare	Omar Faruk Bishal	Murad Noor		Shahrear Polock	Folk	
2020	Abol Tabol	Shomeshwar Oli	Apeiruss		Taneem Rahman Angshu	House Music	
2020	Poka	Sharmin Sultana Sumi	Fuad Al Muqtadir		Taneem Rahman Angshu	Soft rock	
2021	Ami Kori Tomar Asha	Plabon Koreshi	Plabon Koreshi		Affan Aziz Pritul	Folk	
2021	Janoto Ami	Rajib Hasan	Muntasir Tusher		Taneem Rahman Angshu	Soft rock	
2021	Addha	Omar Faruk Bishal	Omar Faruk Bishal		Masud Hasan Ujjal	Pop	
2021	Binodini Roy	Plabon Koreshi	Plabon Koreshi	Sampa Biswas		Folk	
2021	Taan	Ashim Saha	Murad Noor		Badiul Alam Khokon	Folk	
2021	Drowning	Apeiruss	Apeiruss		Shahrear Polock	House music	
2022	Dhonno Dhonno	Plabon Koreshi	Plabon Koreshi	Sampa Biswas	Affan Aziz Pritul	Folk	
2022	Dhyane Gyane	Murad Noor	Murad Noor	Sampa Biswas	Affan Aziz Pritul & Tahsin	Folk	
2022	Ki Nesha	Plabon Koreshi	Plabon Koreshi		Tahsin & Ahad	Sufi	
2022	Chan Rate	Mehedi Hassan Tamjid	Mehedi Hassan Tamjid	Sampa Biswas			
2022	Harmony Bajao	Plabon Koreshi	Plabon Koreshi	Sampa Biswas	Affan Aziz Pritul	Folk	
2022	Mon Kharaper Din	Suhrid Sufian	Tarun Munshi		Affan Aziz Pritul		
2022	Moner Betha	Golam Morshed	Rupok		Affan Aziz Pritul	Folk	
2022	Shoshi Kanto Dhor	Plabon Koreshi	Plabon Koreshi	Sampa Biswas	Affan Aziz Pritul	Folk	
2023	Mon Amar Kande	Ashim Saha	Baul Garib Muktar		Affan Aziz Pritul	Folk	

== Books ==
Sabbir Hasan Nasir is the author of several books. Notable works include;

- Podochinnho (2010)
- Maqalat-e-Shams-e-Tabriz (2018)
- Maqalat-e-Shams-e-Tabriz, Part 2
- Maqalat-e-Shams-e-Tabriz, Part 3: Biography
