= Taneem Rahman Angshu =

Bangladeshi filmmaker

- তানিম রহমান অংশু
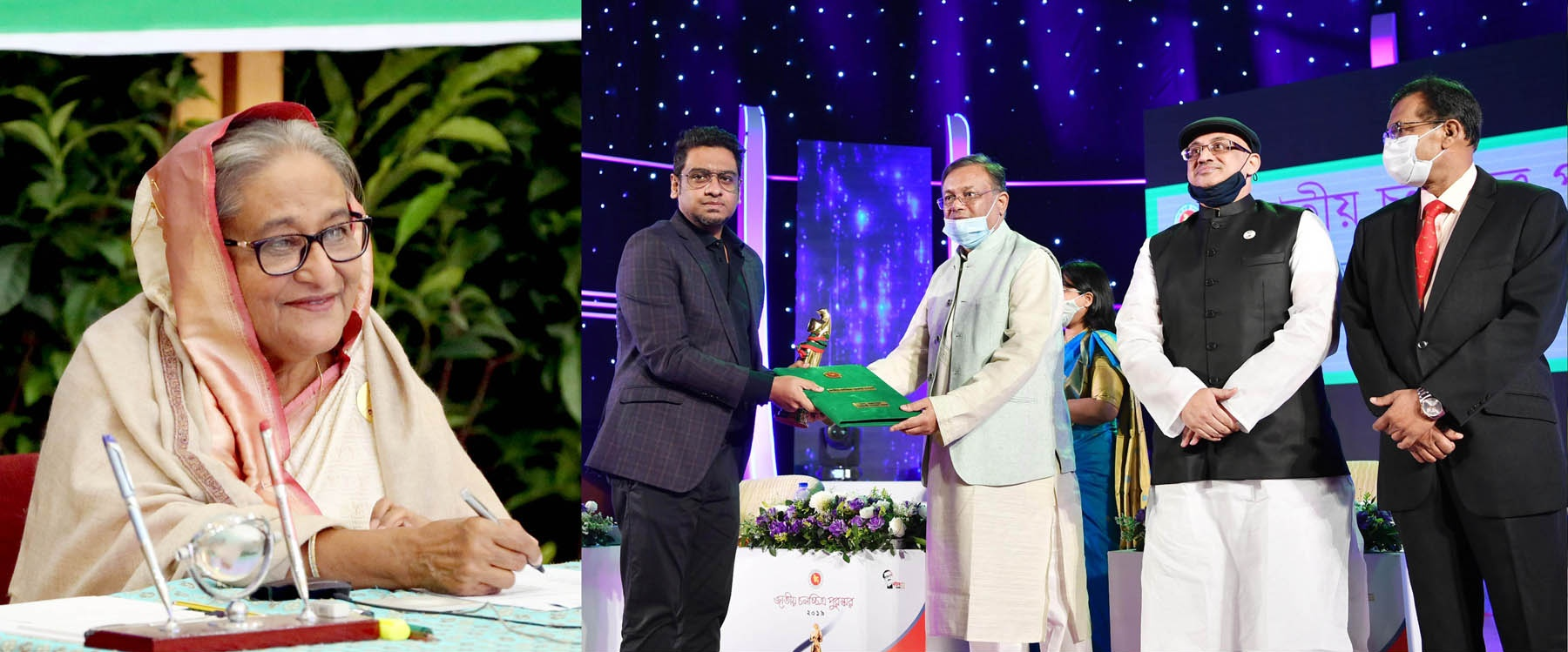
- Angshu receiving National Film Award (2021)
- Born: Bangladesh
- Occupations: Filmmaker, director, music video director
- Years active: 2003–present
- Notable work: Shopner Ghor (2018); No Dorai (2019)
- Children: 1
- Relatives: Taskeen Rahman (brother)
- Awards: Full list

Taneem Rahman Angshu is a Bangladeshi filmmaker specializing in Bengali film and television production. His debut feature film, Shopner Ghor (2018), received praise and earned him the Best Director (Bangladesh) award at the 18th Telecine Awards in Kolkata, India.

His second film, No Dorai (2019), was a commercial success, winning six awards at the 33rd National Film Awards in Bangladesh, including Best Director and Best Film. No Dorai also received the FIPRESCI Award at the 18th Dhaka International Film Festival. Additionally, Angshu won the Best Music Video award at the Channel i Music Awards in both 2016 and 2017.

== Career ==
Angshu made his directorial debut with the short film Bheja Fry (2007), which was screened at the Dhaka International Film Festival. He went on to create television commercials and documentaries for NGOs and agencies in Bangladesh.

In 2012, he directed his first feature-length television film, Spook, a zombie apocalypse horror film that aired on Channel 24, starring Bidya Sinha Mim, Anisur Rahman Milon, and Azad Abul Kalam. Other TV films he directed include Ami Trina o Magic (2012), Alo (2014), Hothat Tomar Jonno (2014), Life and Fiona (2014), and Ongsher Shesh Ektai (2014).

During this time, he also directed music videos in Bangladesh, including Bondho Janala and Megho Milan.

His film Air Bender (2015) was the first television film in Bangladesh to be filmed inside a commercial aircraft. By the time he directed his first major TV series, The Daily Fright Night (2015), Angshu had worked on more than 30 TV dramas and telefilms. The series, which aired on Gazi TV, ran for over 200 episodes.

Shopner Ghor (2018), his first theatrical feature, starred Zakia Bari Mamo and Anisur Rahman Milon and won him the Best Director award at the 18th Telecine Awards.

His 2019 film No Dorai, produced by Star Cineplex and starring Sunerah Binte Kamal and Sariful Razz, was inspired by the story of a female surfer from Cox's Bazar. The film won six National Film Awards in 2020, including Best Film and Best Director. Angshu also received the FIPRESCI Award at the 18th Dhaka International Film Festival, becoming the second Bangladeshi director to win it after Tareque Masud. The film was also selected for the Asia Pacific Screen Awards (APSA) 2020 in Brisbane, Australia.

In 2025, Angshu served as a jury member for the 11th Dhaka International Mobile Film Festival (DIMFF), evaluating films in the Open Door and Vertical Film categories.

== Music Videos ==
Angshu received two Channel i Music Awards for Best Music Video—Hariye Fela Bhalobasha in 2016 and Jhoom in 2017.

Year	Title	Artist
2009	Bondho Janala	Shironamhin
2009	Chithi Pouche Jabe	Shironamhin
2012	Megho Milon	Tanjib Sarowar
2013	Abar Hashimukh	Shironamhin
2014	Ahare	Minar Rahman
2015	Hariye Fela Bhalobasha	Habib Wahid
2015	Dil Amar	Tanjib Sarowar
2015	Please Don't Walk Away	Adit Ft. Bammy
2015	Pagli Suriya	Liza
2015	Ami Chuye Dilei	Nancy
2016	Jhoom	Minar Rahman
2016	Asho Mama Hey	Pritom Hasan
2016	Local Bus	Pritom Hasan
2016	Moner Thikana	Habib Wahid
2016	Dub Shatar	Nodi
2016	Mon Doriya	Adit Ft. Papon And Dola
2016	Ure Jai	Adit Ft. Shehtaz And Bammy
2016	Tumi Moy Hok Shomoy	Adit Ft. Shuvomita
2016	Tumi Ashba Naki	Salma
2017	Ta Janina	Minar Rahman
2017	Ki Tomar Naam	Minar Rahman
2017	Ki Kori	Minar Rahman
2017	Jadukor	Pritom Hasan
2017	Dhaka Dynamites Official Theme Song	Pritom Hasan
2017	Bhairal Bhai	Pritom Hasan
2017	Beyain Shaab	Pritom Hasan
2017	Raj Kumar	Pritom Hasan
2017	Jhor	Habib Wahid
2017	Ghum	Habib Wahid
2017	Cholo Na	Habib Wahid
2017	Chobi	Indalo
2017	Deuliya	Tanjib Sarwar
2017	Ek Shohor Bhalobasha	Tanjib Sarwar
2017	Ghum Hoye	Adit Ft. Shoeb
2017	Keu Januk Ar Nai Januk	Susmita Anis
2017	Tomar Akash	Susmita Anis
2018	Barabari	Minar Rahman
2018	Girl Friend Er Biya	Pritom Hasan
2018	Tumi Bolo	Kaushik Hossain Taposh
2018	Abar Tui	Habib Wahid
2018	Tor Namer Icchera	Imran Mahmudul
2018	Amar E Mon	Imran Mahmudul
2018	Bole Dao	Adit
2018	Baishaki Prem	Kumar Bishwajit
2019	Anmone	Tahsan Khan and Mala
2020	Mon Posh Manena	Tanjib Sarwar
2020	Poka	Sabbir Nasir

== Filmography ==
=== Featured Films ===
Year	Title	Release date
2018	Shopner Ghor	9 November 2018
2019	No Dorai	29 November 2019
2021	Shahoshika	10 August 2021

=== Television ===
- Spook (2012) – Drama
- Ami Trina O Magic (2012) - Drama
- Fully Baked, Fully Wise, Fully Yourself (2012) - Drama
- Impossible Five (2013) - Telefilm
- Aalo (2014) - Telefilm
- Dui Angsher Sesh Ektai (2014) - Drama
- Life and Feona (2014) - Telefilm
- Hothat Tomar Jonno (2014) - Drama
- Time Cloud (2015) - Drama
- Kopa Shamsu (2015) - Drama
- 4th Note (2015) - Series Drama
- Flipper (2015) - Drama
- Point Blank (2015) - Drama
- Airbender (2015) - Telefilm
- Daily Fright Night (2015) - Series Drama
- Apnar Onuvuti Ki (2016) - Drama
- Tomake Alo Vebe (2016) - Drama
- Abesh (2016) - Drama
- Ko Te Kazi, Kho Te Khela (2016) - Drama
- Dui Ongsher Sesh Ekhanei (2016) - Telefilm
- Jokhon Bashonta (2017) - Drama
- Ke, Keno, Kivabe (2017) - Drama

=== Web Series ===
Year	Title	OTT platform	Release date
2022	Teerondaj	Bioscope	23 March 2022
2023	Buker Moddhye Agun	Hoichoi	2 March 2023

== Awards ==
- Channel i Music Award for Best Music Video (2016, 2017)
- 18th Telecine Awards – Best Director (2018)
- National Film Awards – Best Director and Best Film for No Dorai (2019)
- FIPRESCI Award (2019)
