= Bangladeshi hip-hop =

Genre of music in Bangladesh

- Stylistic origins: Hip-hop; R&B; soul; Rap
- Cultural origins: 1990

Bangladeshi hip-hop is a music genre that covers a variety of styles of hip-hop music developed in Bangladesh. It is heavily influenced by American hip-hop, and started in the early 1990s. Artists use lyrical expressions to address Bangladesh's political and social problems, lifestyles, nature, cultures, and communities.

== History ==
=== Early Years (1993–2005) ===
As the pioneers of rap music in the Bengali-language music industry, Ashraf Babu and Charu released Tri-Rotner Khepa in early 1993, which was the first Bengali rap music album.

In 2004, Stoic Bliss, formed as a hip-hop crew with eight members. The group introduced Banglish, a rap fusion in Bangla rap. Stoic Bliss ventured into the music industry in Bangladesh with a goal of introducing a new genre of music. They released their first album in 2006.

In 2005, a US-based Bangladeshi rapper named Shaon Ahmed (known by Fokir Lal Miah) released an album named Quest for Glory. His second album, Ekla Eksho, was more successful. A week after the album was released, it recorded 30,000 units sold in the UK.

=== Rising era (2006–2018) ===
Stoic Bliss's debut album, Light Years Ahead, sold over 250,000 copies within 10 months, having a major impact on the rise of hip-hop in Bangladesh. In 2006, Deshi MCs was formed. and they released their first album, Banned 1.0.

At this point, hip-hop was quickly gaining popularity in Bangladesh, especially among students. In 2009, Grand T became the first Bangladeshi rapper to do an international collaboration. Many Bangla hip-hop albums at that time were commercial successes. In 2010, a Bangladeshi hip-hop group called Theology of Rap (T.O.R.) released an album named Hip Hop Jaati which was a great success. This band was formed in 2005, but started getting popularity when a Bangladeshi rapper The Grand T joined in 2008. In 2011, T.O.R. released Hip Hop Jaati 2.0 which was a collaboration between artists like Uptown Lokolz, Thugz of Dhaka, and Mc Shaq from Deshi MCs.

In 2014, MC Mugz from Deshi MCs and Shafayet from RHG joined the Jalali Set. In 2015 they released a song named "Sura Target" which went viral on internet. Next, they released their first album, Level 13. In 2017, Stoic Bliss and Deshi MCs, who had not released an album in recent years, came back with new song releases.

== Notable groups ==
=== Stoic Bliss ===
In 2004, Queens based Bangladeshi hip-hop group Stoic Bliss was formed. They first introduced Banglish (Bangla-English), a rap fusion in Bangla rap. Stoic Bliss was the first to introduce hip-hop to Bangladesh through blogs before modern social media existed, quickly gaining popularity in the underground music scene in Bangladesh. Their debut album, Lights Years Ahead, was released in Bangladesh under the G-Series banner in June 2006. The single "Abar Jigay" from their first album gave the group its notability among the Bengali community. The Light Years Ahead album sold well over 250,000 copies within the first 10 months, making Stoic Bliss an emerging mainstream music group in Bangladesh.

=== Deshi MCs ===
Dhaka based crew Deshi MCs was formed in 2006. MC Shaq, Xplosive, and Skibkhan were the founding members. Later, another member, Mc Mugz, joined the group. They first introduced gangsta rap to the Bangladeshi culture. In 2006, they released their first studio album named Banned. They are known as the pioneers of Banglish Gangsta Rap.

=== Uptown Lokolz ===
Another crew from Dhaka City named Uptown Lokolz founded by Taurra Safa and Black Zang was formed in 2008. In the same year, they released their first album, Kahini Scene Paat [Explicit]. The single "Ai Mama Ai" from their first album was well received nationwide.

=== Jalali Set ===
The rappers involved are Mc Mugz, Double S, Shadhu and Jalali Shafayat. In 2015 Jalali set caught the attention of the public by releasing their song Sura Target on YouTube. Later in 2016 they released their album Level 13 which got recognition for the local sound and raw slang of Dhaka.

=== Comilla Hip Hop Hood ===
Comilla Hip Hop Hood (CHH) is a hip-hop collective from Comilla. It's a collective group of Rappers, B boys, Graffiti Artist, Stunner, Beat Boxer, Composer, Vfx / Gfx Designers.

=== Brahmanbaria Hip Hop Side ===
Brahmanbaria Hip Hop Side (BB SIDE) is a hip-hop crew from Brahmanbaria,Bangladesh(3400),Formed in 2024 by Rh Sakib,Mr PsychoV, and THE 4TEEN. BB SIDE represent their city with raw lyrics,street energy, and a mission to push Brahmanbaria’s hip-hop culture forward.

== Notable artists ==
- Double S
- Shadhu
- Charu

== See also ==
- Apeiruss
- Fuad al Muqtadir
