= Parthibo =

Bangladeshi pop rock band

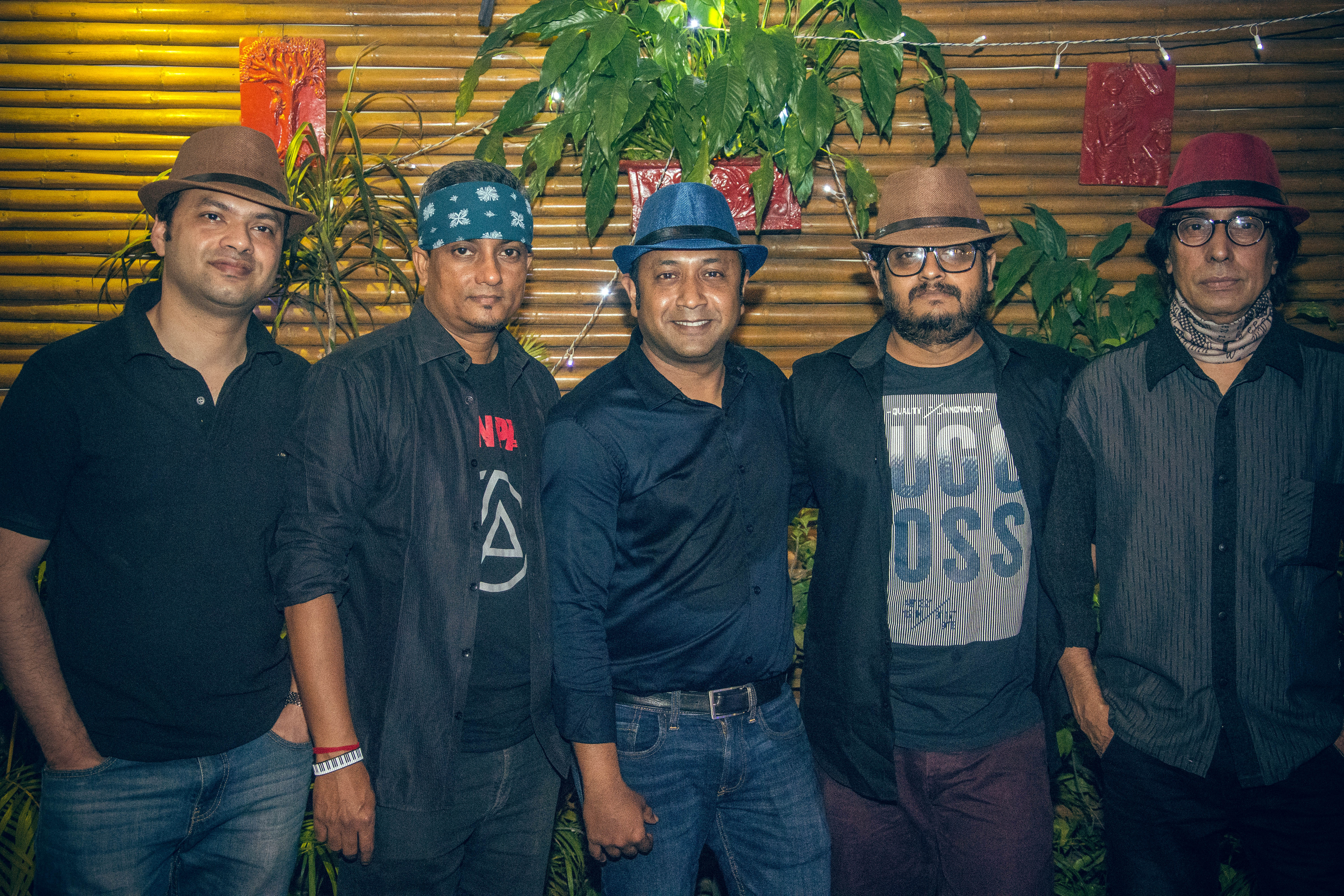

Background information
- Years active: 1998–present
- Labels: Arshee; G-Series; Incursion; CMV
- Members: Ashfaqul Bari Rumon; Rony; Shubho; Kibria Kibu
- Past members: John Sutton Munshi; Selim Haider

Parthibo is a Bangladeshi pop-rock group, formed in 1998. As of 2017, the band members were Rumon (guitar and vocals), Rony (keyboard and vocals), Kibria Kibu (bass guitar), Shubho (drums), and guest guitarist Selim Haider.

== History ==
=== Main career (2002–2009) ===
In 2002, Parthibo won two awards (Best Solo Performer and Best Lyricist) in the B&H Star Search 2002.

Their first full album, Baundule, was released in 2005. Parthibo won the award for Best Band in the 2005 Citycell-Channel I Music Awards.

=== 2011–present ===
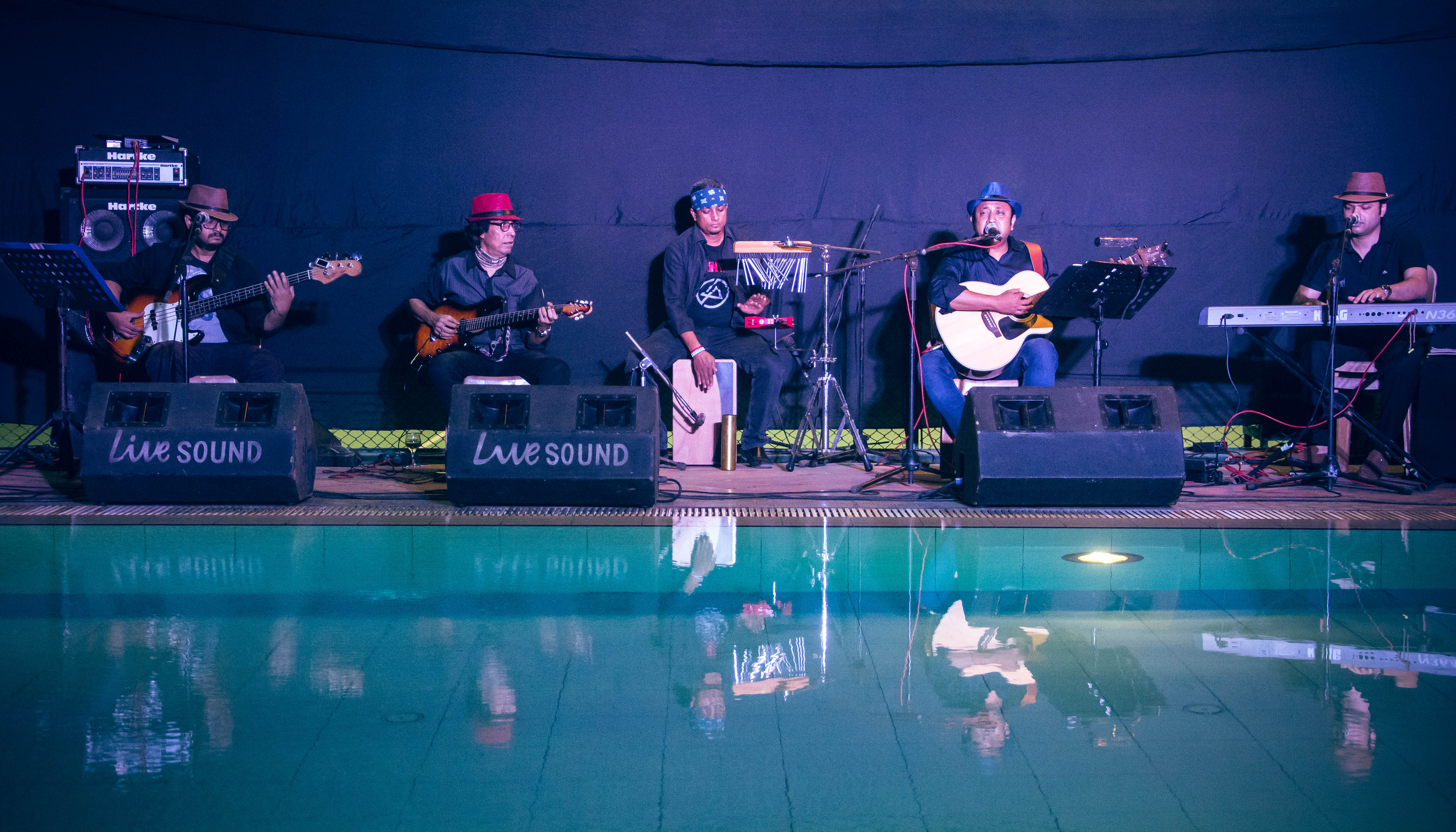

In 2011, the band released their second album, Utshorgo Nijeke.

Parthibo launched their third album, Parthibo The Definitive Album, on 25 June 2014. The dual CD album contains 10 rearranged hits from their past albums and 10 brand new songs. In 2016, Parthibo released their fourth album, Swagoto Bangladeshe.

== Members ==
Current members

- Ashfaqul Bari Rumon – vocals, guitar
- Rony – keyboards, vocals
- Shubho – drums, percussion
- Kibria Kibu – bass

Guest musicians

- John Sutton Munshi – bass
- Selim Haider – guitar

== Discography ==
=== Albums ===
- Baundule (Arshee – 2005)
- Utshorgo Nijeke (G-Series – 2011)
- Parthibo The Definitive Album (2014)
- Swagoto Bangladesh (2016)

=== Guest appearances ===
- Shopnochura (G-Series – 2005)
- Radio Mania 2 (Ektaar – 2008)
- Rocoholic

== Awards ==
- Bast Solo Performer and Best Lyricist – Benson & Hedges Star Search 2002 (Rumon)
- Best Band – Citycell-Channel i Music Awards 2005
- Best Band – Channel i Music Awards 2017
