= Liza Part 1 =

Album by Sania Sultana Liza

Liza Part-1

Studio album by Sania Sultana Liza
- Released: 2012
- Genre: Modern; Melodious; Pop
- Language: Bengali
- Label: G-Series

Sania Sultana Liza chronology
| Liza Part-1 (2012) | Pagli Suraiya (2015) |

Liza Part-1 is a studio album by singers Sania Sultana Liza and Tausif Ahmed, released in 2012.

== Track listing ==
| No. | Title | Length |
|---|---|---|
| 1. | "A Ki Maya" |
| 2. | "Janle Na Tumi with Tausif" |
| 3. | "Nesha Nesha" |
| 4. | "Khayale" |
| 5. | "Projapoti Mon" |
| 6. | "Megher Mitaly" |
| 7. | "Jao Pakhi" |
| 8. | "Mon Diechi" |
| 9. | "Para Porshi" |
