= Shongram (soundtrack) =

Soundtrack album by Armeen Musa
- Released: 18 March 2014 (Bangladesh); June 2014 (digital download)
- Recorded: December 2012 – November 2013 at Bengal Recording Studio in Dhaka, Bangladesh and Liquid Sound Productions in Boston, Massachusetts, United States
- Genre: Bengali acoustic; Bhawaiya; filmi; Nazrul Geeti fusion
- Length: 29:22 (CD edition) / 36:46 (digital download edition)
- Language: Bengali
- Label: Laser Vision
- Producer: Armeen Musa; Emon Saha

Armeen Musa chronology
| Finding Fall (2013) | Shongram (2014) | Simultaneously (2015) |

Singles from Shongram
- 1. "Janina Kokhon" Released: 28 March 2014

Shongram (Bengali: সংগ্রাম) is the soundtrack album to the 2014 film of the same name, written and directed by Munsur Ali. The album is the first soundtrack and third studio album by Boston-based Bangladeshi singer-songwriter and composer Armeen Musa.

== Background ==
Director of the film Munsur Ali wrote a scene based on the song "Ey Shondhay", which Armeen Musa co-wrote with Saif Q in 2007 and featured on her 2008 debut album Aye Ghum Bhangai. Ali contacted Musa via Twitter for permission to use the song for the film in September 2011. Coincidentally, Musa was intending to visit London the following month, and after meeting in person, Ali offered her the job of soundtrack composer in December 2011. Subsequently, a pre-launch event was held at Rich Mix in London on 18 December 2011.

In March 2014, whilst speaking with Dhaka Tribune, Musa said, "...In the journey of this movie I got to explore various genres and discover my own abilities as a music director and I am really proud that my first film soundtrack was one about ‘71 [Bangladesh Liberation War]."

== Recording and production ==
Recording started in December 2012 at Bengal Recording Studio in Dhaka, Bangladesh this included Nashid Kamal's vocals for "Rashmonchey Dol Dol", Gazi Abdul Hakim's flute for "Shongram Theme" and the full song of "Main Toh Huin Pareshan". The remaining tracks and mixing was accomplished at Liquid Sound Productions in Boston, Massachusetts. Recording was complete in November 2013.

Musa and Hadi were particularly nervous about arranging a Nazrul Geeti therefore they recorded three or four different versions of "Rashmonchey Dol Dol" (sung by her mother, Nashid Kamal) using electric guitars, acoustic guitars and strings, before choosing the final version. After completing the album, Musa was "especially excited" about the cajón and nylon string guitar fusion in the song.

== Composition ==
The album contains seven songs (including a theme song) which are sung by Nashid Kamal, Kona, Armeen Musa, Nolok Babu, Razu and Zanita Ahmed Zilik. It also includes two instrumentals; "Shongram Theme" and "Ei Shondhay".

The tracks were composed by Armeen Musa and the background music score was composed by Emon Saha.

== Release ==
A seven-track album was released by Laser Vision in Bangladesh on 18 March 2014. The album was launched at the Seven Hills Restaurant in Bangla Motor, Dhaka. Present at the event were musician Azad Rahman, filmmakers; Morshedul Islam, Majharul Islam and Khalid Mahmud Mithu, director of the film Munsur Ali, general secretary of Bangladesh Film Directors Association Mushfiqur Rahman Gulzar, media personality Mosrher-ul-Alam, A K M Arifur Rahman, Chairman of Laser Vision, actors and film crew.

A full nine-track edition of the album was made available for digital download internationally from June 2014.

== Track listing ==
All music is composed by Armeen Musa except "Janina Kokhon" by Emon Saha

| No. | Title | Lyrics | Music | Artist(s) | Length |
|---|---|---|---|---|---|
| 1. | "Ei Shondhay" | Armeen Musa | Saif Q (electric guitar) | Armeen Musa | 4:23 |
| 2. | "Janina Kokhon" | Sudip Kumar Dip | Emon Saha (composition) | Kona, Razu | 5:52 |
| 3. | "Main Toh Huin Pareshan" | Pintu Ghosh | Prithwi Raj (composition) | Zanita Ahmed Zilik | 3:24 |
| 4. | "Rashmonchey Dol Dol" (Nazrul Geeti) | Kazi Nazrul Islam | Ahsanul Hadi (acoustic guitar), Zak Dylan Wass (cajón) | Nashid Kamal | 3:37 |
| 5. | "Nodi Re" | | Layth Siddiq (violin) | Nolok Babu | 5:17 |
| 6. | "Ei Shondhay" (Acoustic) | Armeen Musa | Zak Dylan Wass (acoustic guitar) | Armeen Musa | 3:24 |
| 7. | "Asha's (Theme)" | | Franny King-Smith (piano) | Patricia Moreno | 3:25 |
| Total length: | | | | | 29:22 |

Digital download edition
| No. | Title | Music | Length |
|---|---|---|---|
| 8. | "Shongram Theme" (Instrumental) | Michal Weiner (arrangement), Gazi Abdul Hakim (flute) | 3:53 |
| 9. | "Ei Shondhay" (Instrumental) | Eivind Lødemel (piano), Layth Siddiq (violin) | 3:31 |
| Total length: | | | 36:46 |

Notes

- The lyrics for "Nodi Re" were collected locally.
- The digital download edition of the album includes two bonus instrumental tracks.

== Personnel ==
Musicians

- Zak Dylan Wass – acoustic guitar, cajón
- Saif Q – electric guitar
- Ahsanul "Adil" Hadi – acoustic guitar
- Layth Siddiq – violin
- Franny King-Smith – piano
- Gazi Abdul Hakim – flute
- Eivind Lødemel – piano

Vocalists

- Armeen Musa
- Kona
- Razu
- Zanita Ahmed Zilik
- Nashid Kamal
- Nolok Babu
- Patricia Moreno

Technical

- Giosuè Greco – mix engineer
- Zak Dylan Wass – recording engineer
- Shubho (Bengal) – recording engineer

== See also ==
- Artistic depictions of Bangladesh Liberation War
