= Apeiruss =

Bangladeshi musical composer

Apeiruss অ্যাপিরাস
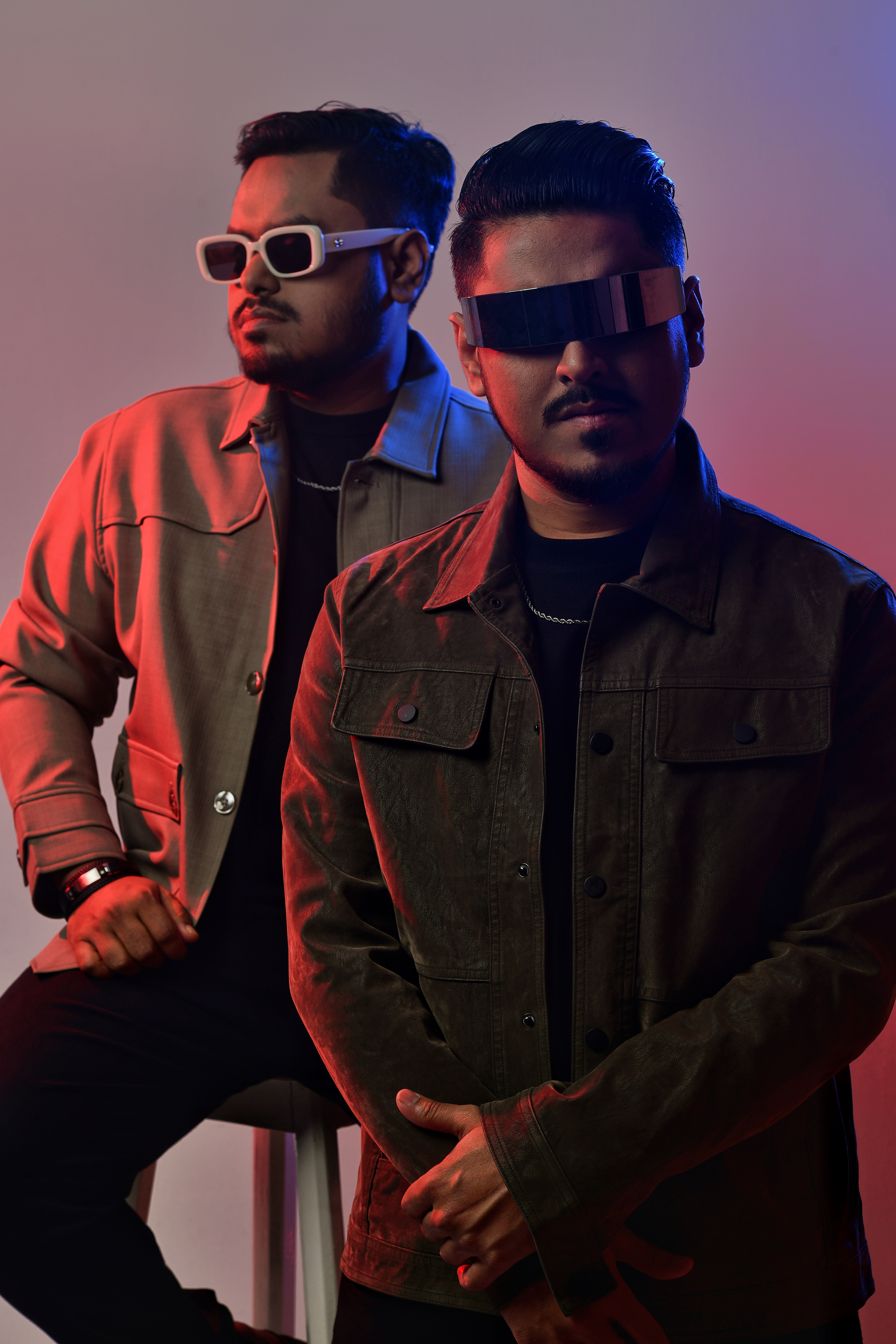
- Apeiruss in 2023

Background information
- Origin: Dhaka, Bangladesh
- Genres: Electro house, dance-pop, progressive house, EDM, ambient, pop, future bass, reggaeton
- Instruments: PC, guitar, keyboard
- Years active: 2014–present
- Labels: HTM Records, CMV, Music & Sound
- Members: Sheikh Saami Mahmud; Sheikh Shafi Mahmud
- Past members: Adnan Shahid

Apeiruss is a Bangladeshi EDM composer, music producer and DJ duo consisting of Sheikh Saami Mahmud & Sheikh Shafi Mahmud. They are one of the most reputed EDM artist in the mainstream Bangladeshi music industry. Apart from Bangladesh, they also left their footprint in the Bollywood scene where they worked on many film songs and singles. They kicked off their career with their debut track “Bijoyer Shopno” back in 2014 with various artists. They produced "Bhalobeshe Niruddeshe" (2016) & "Cholona Harai" (2017) for Tahsan. Some of their notable Bollywood music production are with Amaal Mallik, Armaan Malik (Zindegi Aa Raha Hoon Main, Sau Aasman, Buddhu Saa Mann etc.) & Arko Pravo Mukherjee (Dariya Dance mix, Saalam-E-Ishq etc.). In October 2019, "Ishqam" was released by Mika Singh and Ali Quli Mirza and it was entirely composed and produced by Apeiruss. "Ishqam" since gathered around 230 million views on YouTube.

== Career ==
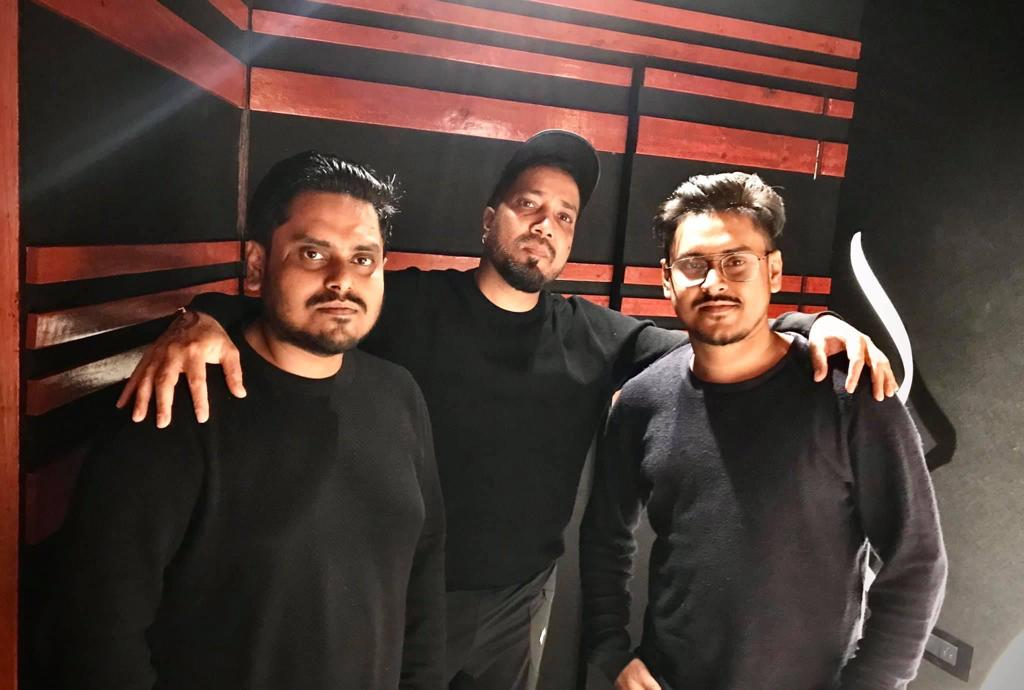
Apeiruss in the Studio With Mika Singh in Mumbai 2019

=== Early days ===
Apeiruss was formed back in 2013 by Saami, Shafi & Andy. Saami & Shafi were brothers and they have been practicing music production from a very early stage. They taught themselves the basic music production skills using FL Studio in their bedroom. Saami & Andy were college friends since 2010. Andy also showed interest in music production ever since so he also joined the clan. After many musical sessions they came to form Apeiruss as a trio back in 2013. At the beginning they were making music using their computers only.

=== Working in Bangladesh ===
After 'Bijoyer Shopno' Apeiruss started their journey in the local music industry. They would later work with many prominent Bangladeshi artists as music composer and producer. Some of their notable Bangladeshi songs are 'Cholona Harai' with Tahsan, 'Leelabali' with Mala & Uptown lokolz, 'Shudhu Amar' with SHUNNO, 'Obosheshe' featuring Naumi, 'Ami Tumi' featuring Elita Karim, Hotaath with Balam etc.

=== Working in Bollywood ===
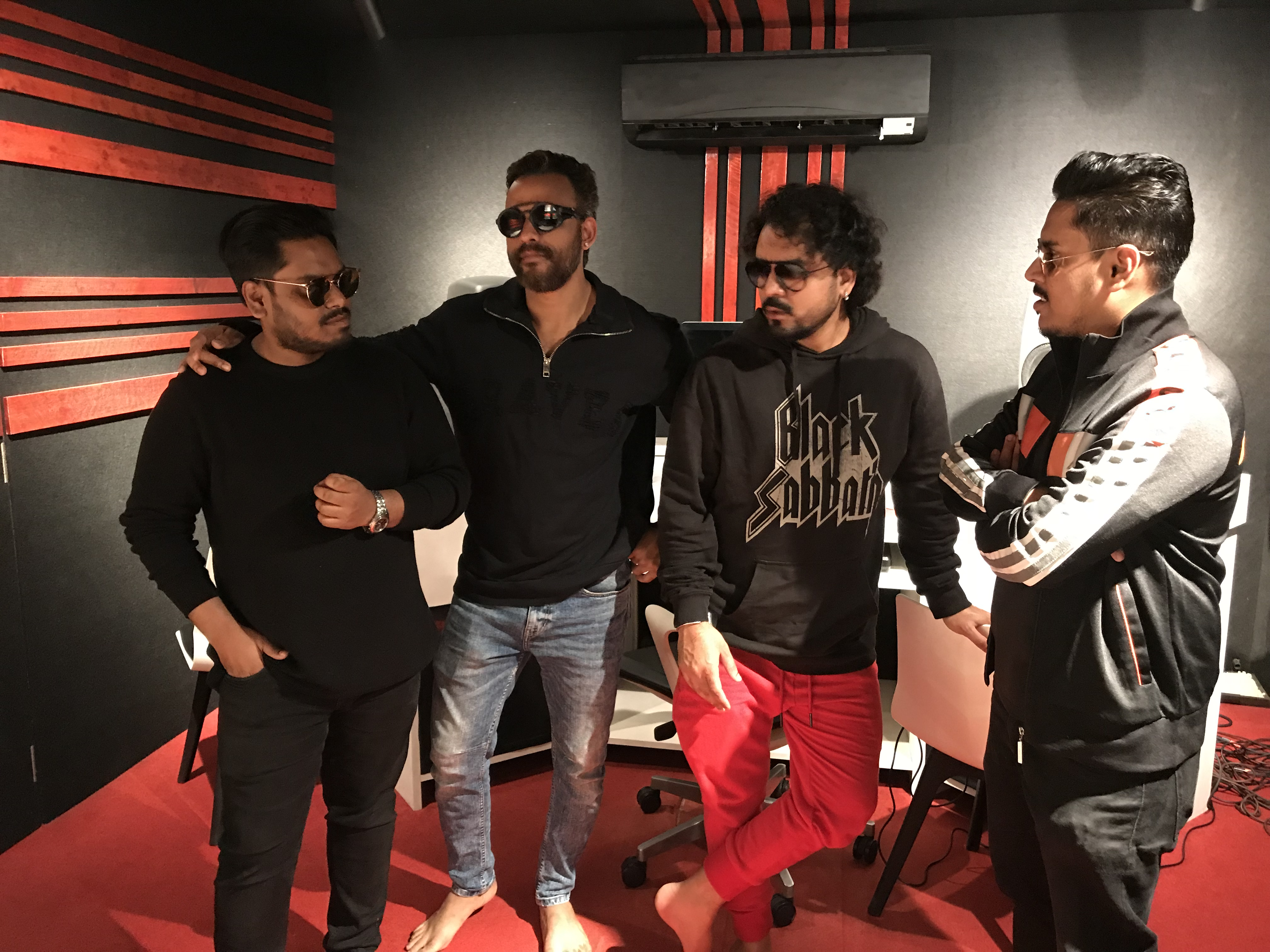
Apeiruss with Shaarib Toshi 2019

Back in 2015 Apeiruss's then manager Tanzil Rahman sent some of their demos to various artists, managers and labels. However one day a Bollywood playback singer Armaan Malik checked out their music and showed interest to work with them. Then he introduced Apeiruss with his brother Amaal Mallik. Amaal offered Apeiruss to produce a track he was composing for Atif Aslam. Apeiruss worked on that track as an additional programmer. The song became a massive hit. Through this song they started their Bollywood journey. They would later produce more songs of Amaal Mallik including 'Sau Aasman', 'Buddhu Sa Mann' etc. Amaal introduced Apeiruss with Arko Pravo Mukherjee with whom they did couple more songs. In 2017 Apeiruss asked Armaan Malik to sing a Bengali Song. Together they made 'Tor Karone' which was sung by Armaan Malik and composed by Apeiruss. It was the first Bangladeshi song for Armaan Malik. In 2019 Apeiruss composed 'Ishqam' with Bollywood playback singer Mika Singh and Ali Quli Mirza. The song was released from Navrattan Music in October 2019. "Ishqam became one of their massive hits till date generating views more than 230 million worldwide. In November they released 'Dil Ki Masti' featuring Rumman Chowdhury which was featured in a short film called 'Naina Da Kasoon' produced by Mika Singh. Recently in 2020 Apeiruss produced a song named "Mareez E Ishq (reloaded)" composed and sang by Shaarib Sabri and it got released from Sony Music India. Apeiruss produced music for the background themes of very popular TV show called Ishq Main Marjawan 2 and also produced romantic, sad songs of the drama in collaboration with Shaarib-Toshi.

== Members ==
=== Present members ===
- Sheikh Saami Mahmud
- Sheikh Shafi Mahmud

=== Past members ===
- Adnan Shahid (2014–19)

== Discography ==
=== Singles ===
2014

- Halfway to Heaven
- #Duckface (feat. Amid)

2015

- Without You feat (Akash)
- Reborn (feat. Stephan neera & Kaizer kaiz)

2016

- Obosheshe (feat. Naumi)
- Bhalobeshe Niruddeshe (feat. Tahsan & Moon)
- Abstraction (with Tanzil Hasan)
- Fight For You

2017

- Tor Karone (feat. Armaan Malik)
- Shudhu Amar with Shunno
- Dangerous (feat. Bigg Spade)
- Down For Your Love (feat. Rumman Chowdhury)
- Joss Na? (with Beatbaksho)
- Hammer On
- Leelabali (feat. Mala & Uptown Lokolz)

2018

- Nao Chariya De (feat. Palbasha Siddique)
- Janiye Dao (feat. Mithun Chakra)
- Jitbe Amar Team (Dance version) with Shuvo, Tahsan, Xefer, Kona, Momtaz, & Mizan.

2019

- Ami Tumi (Feat. Elita Karim)
- Khola Akash (Feat. Tasnim Anika & Balam)
- Hothaat with Balam
- Ishqam with Mika Singh & Ali Quli Mirza
- Dil Ki Masti (feat. Rumman Chowdhury)
- Shunno Pata (feat. Lamiya Chowdhury)
- Keno Tumi Nai (feat. TahseeNation & Rumman Chowdhury
- Schizophrenia (Feat. Lamiya Chowdhury)
- Doob (remake) with Borno

2020

- Mrito Jonaki (ft. Sabbir Nasir)
- Mareez E Ishq Reload (Produced, Mixed & Mastered by Apeiruss)
- Anarosher Pizza by Apeiruss
- Come See The Sunrise (Inspired by ‘The Outlaw Ocean’ a book by Ian Urbina) [Album]

2021

- Mama Dekhao Power (ft. Parvez Sazzad)

2023

- Baby (feat. Belal Khan)
- Jaiona (feat. Niloy)
- Tumi Chara (Debosrie Antara)
- Taara (ft. Lamiya Chowdhury)
- Jaadu (ft. Raz Dee)
- TOTA PAKHI (with Stoic Bliss)
- Bondhu Koi Roila Re (with Stoic Bliss ft. G.M Ashraf)
- Taka Guno (with Stoic Bliss)
