= CloseUp1 =

2005 Bangladeshi reality television programme

- Genre: Reality television
- Directed by: Tanveer Khan (2005–06); Supon Roy (2008); Alfred Khokon (2012)
- Presented by: Debashish Biswas (2005–06); Afreen Samia (2005–06); Abid Shahriar (2008); Sajia Sultana Putul (2008,2012); Sayem Salek (2012)
- Judges: Ahmed Imtiaz Bulbul (2005-08,2012); Kumar Bishwajit (2005,06); Shakila Zafar (2005); Samina Chowdhury (2006); Partha Barua (2008,2012); Fahmida Nabi (2008,2012)
- Theme music composer: Naquib Khan
- Opening theme: Dekha Hobe Bijoye
- Country of origin: Bangladesh
- Original language: Bangla
- No. of seasons: 4

Production
- Running time: 60 minutes (approx.)
- Production companies: Unilever Bangladesh Limited, Closeup Bangladesh

Original release
- Network: NTV
- Release: 2005 – 2012

Close Up-1: Tomakei Khujchhey Bangladesh is a Bangladeshi reality television programme similar to American Idol and the rest of the Idol series.

== Close Up-1 2005 (season 1) ==
The final performance round of the show began with our National Anthem on 16 December, our Victory Day, The theme was patriotic songs. Nolok kicked off with a rendition of 'Mago bhabna kano' composed by Hemanta Mukhopadhyay.

By winning the first ever 'Close Up-1', Nolok Babu received a music contract worth Taka 1,000,000. Other rewards include a brand new car by BRAC Bank Limited. Nolok Babu, age 20, started singing in public after his father walked out when he was nine.

Nolok Babu got as many as 784,391 votes to win this competition quite convincingly, while Mizan Mahmud Razib and Beauty got 313,946 votes and 320,328 votes, respectively. But mizan mahmud Razib got 49 points and both Nolok & Beauty got 39 points from the three judges of Close Up-1 : Ahmed Imtiaz Bulbul, Kumar Bishwajit & Shakila Zafar.

As a 1st runner-up, Mizan Mahmud Razib who is now a famous vocal artist, got a music contract of 500,000 taka and as a 3rd runner-up, Beauty received a contract worth 300,000 taka. Besides these, Shamapti Roy was awarded 'Close Up-1 Confidence Award' for taking part in this competition in spite of the limitation of her blindness and poverty. She got 100,000 taka. Chjgku uikhampa Banik was awarded the 'Close Up-1 Personality Award'; she had left this tournament for an important round for the sake of the birth of her newborn child. She got 50 thousand taka.

== Close Up-1 2006 (season 2) ==
Salma Akhter won the Close Up-1 Tomakei Khujche Bangladesh 2006. Nishita Barua became 2nd Runner-up and Muhin became 1st Runner-up who is now a popular singer in Bangladesh

== Close Up-1 2008 (season 3) ==
In 2008, the third talent hunt organised by Closeup was held. The contest began in June and around 86,000 contestants were selected in the primary rounds from all over the country. From them, 541 got the opportunity to take part in the main contest. At the third selection, 115 were selected. From the 115, 42 were singled out. Out of 42, only the top 16 were chosen. Sania Sultana Liza was the winner of Close Up-1.

On 17 December, the grand finale of "CloseUp1: Tomakei Khujchhey Bangladesh 2008" was held. Sania Sultana Liza from Mymensingh was crowned the new Close Up 1 champion at an award ceremony at the Bangladesh-China Friendship Convention Centre. Apurbo Sarkar Apu from Rajshahi was announced as the first runner-up, and Shaju Ahmed Sarkar became the second runner-up. The winner was selected based on a point system that included both marks given by the judges and public votes (through SMS). Liza got a total of 13,79,951 votes while Apu received 9,88,961 votes. When it came to scores from judges, Liza got 38 out of 50, while the judges gave Apu 47 out of 50. The winner of the contest Liza, received Tk 10 lakh and a car. Apu received a check of Taka 5 lakh and Shaju received a check of Taka 3 lakh. The winners will also get a chance to perform at concerts in the US, Australia, and several countries in Europe. The top four to the top twelve received taka 1 lakh each. The top 12 contestants will also receive an additional taka 50,000 as a scholarship for education in music.

The final began with a rendition of the patriotic song "Maa eto keno asru du'chokhey" by the Close Up 1 2008 finalists. The song was written and composed by Ahmed Imtiaz Bulbul. A performance by Close Up 1 2005 finalists—Nolok, Beauty, Mizan Mahmud Razib, Sonia and others—followed. They also presented a group rendition of the patriotic song "Purbo digontey shurjo uthechhey." The final performances were staged by the four finalists. Apu performed "Aaj brishtir diney ami tumi," Liza performed "Bhul korey jodi kokhono mon-e porey amay," Atik performed "Tor kopaley jodi keu na dey tip," and Shaju performed "Bhalobeshey torey bondhu."

== Close Up-1 2012 (season 4) ==
After passing the nine-month journey and 13 rounds at different phases of this talent-hunt program, Sultana Yeasmin Laila was crowned the Close Up-1 Champion for the fourth season of the popular music reality show. Laila received a total of 5530200 SMS from the country people (as viewers votes). She scored 36 out of 50 by the judgement of three honorable judges Ahmed Imtiaz Bulbul, Fahmida Nabi, and Parth Barua. Sohag got 5822116 votes. Tutul had 300,000 votes. Judges gave 31 and 35 scores to Sohag and Tutul, respectively.

Laila beat Sohag and Tutul on a point system that included both public votes (through SMS) and scores given by the judges.

Sohag and Tutul secured the spot of first and second runners-up titles respectively.

The champion crown winner, Laila, was given a brand new Mitsubishi Mirage car and Tk 1.0 million. The first runner-up received Tk 0.5 million, while Tk 0.3 million went to the second runner-up.

The grand finale was held at the Bangabandhu International Conference Centre, buzzed with some colourful musical performances, and this gala program was anchored by Sayem and former 'Close Up-1' finalist Putul.

== Season winners ==
All Time Winners
Season	Winner	Year	Gender
1	Nolok Babu	2005	Male
2	Salma Akhter	2006	Female
3	Sania Sultana Liza	2008	Female
4	Sultana Yeasmin Laila	2012	Female

== See also ==
- Bangladeshi Idol
