= Nishita Barua =

Nishita Barua নিশিতা বড়ুয়া
- Born: Nishita Barua; 15 July 1990 (age 36); Comilla, Bangladesh
- Origin: Chittagong, Bangladesh
- Genres: Modern, classical
- Occupations: Singer, songwriter, record producer, entrepreneur
- Instrument: Vocal
- Years active: 2006–present
- Website: https://nishitabarua.com/

Nishita Barua (born 15 July 1990) is a Bangladeshi singer, songwriter, record producer and entrepreneur.

== Early life ==
Barua was born on 15 July 1990. Even though she was born in Comilla, Barua is originally from Chittagong. Her father Shakya Pada Barua was a government employee and her mother Suchanda Barua is a housewife. She learnt music from her family at an early age and was very interested.

== Career ==
Barua entered the music arena in 2006 through the Closeup1 Tobei Chantcha Bangladesh music competition. In 2007 she released her music album Amay Niye Cholo which was very successful in the music industry of Bangladesh. Barua sang along with some foreign singers in an international album Bhalobashar Brishti. She also worked as a radio jockey for Radio Today. Barua has voiced some of the jingles for the advertisement. She has also done playback in several popular movies including "Bajao Bier Baajna" and "Mone Bara Jala".

== Discography ==
- Amay Niye Cholo (2007)
- Pujibo Tomay Shur O Shangeet E (2022)
