= Shunno =

Bangladeshi Pop rock band

Shunno শূন্য
- Original members of Shunno: (L to R) Michael, Labib, Shaker and Emil

Background information
- Origin: Dhaka, Bangladesh
- Genres: Alternative rock; pop rock; pop punk; soft rock
- Years active: 2007–present
- Members: Imrul Karim Emil; Shaker Raza; Andrew Michael Gomes; Rafatul Bari Labib; Ishmamul Farhad

Shunno is a Bangladeshi Alternative rock band formed in 2007 in Dhaka by Imrul Karim Emil and Shaker Raza. They are considered one of the most popular bands in Bangladesh, known for their blend of alternative rock, pop rock, pop, and soft rock. Shunno has received several awards, including the Meril-Prothom Alo Award for Best Band of the Year in 2008 and Citycell-Channel i Music Awards in 2009 and 2011. They have also been frequent performers at the popular Joy Bangla Concert.

== History ==
In 2007, vocalist Imrul Karim Emil and lead guitarist Shaker Raza formed Shunno. A few days later, bassist Andrew Michael Gomez and drummer Rafatul Bari Labib joined them.

In 2008, Shunno released their debut album Notun Srot.

In 2009, Shunno's second album Shoto Asha was released.

In 2011, Gorbo Bangladesh, their third album was released by Shunno.

In 2014, their fourth album Bhaago was released. The album contains the song Shono Mohajon, a song about the experience of oppression under dictatorship, which eventually became famous as the "unofficial anthem of Bangladesh" during the Student–People's uprising in 2024.

In 2016, Ishmamul Farhad joined the band as lead guitarist.

In 2017, Their fifth album Lottery was released.

In 2021, Shunno released a song called Bibiya on 1 January and is a story of the south and is a lullaby of a fisherman who is putting off his daughter to sleep before he heads off for his work to the ever so unpredictable sea. Shunno's song Behula was released on 20 March and is a story of the north and the song is based on Shiva Purana and the Manasamangal genre of Bengali medieval epics.

== Discography ==
- Notun Srot (2008)
- Shoto Asha (2009)
- Gorbo Bangladesh (2011)
- Bhaago (2014)
- Lottery (2017)

== Awards ==
- Meril Prothom Alo Awards - Best Band of the Year (2008)
- Citycell-Channel I Music Awards (2009)
- Citycell-Channel I Music Awards (2011)

== Members ==
- Imrul Karim Emil — vocals, guitar (2007–present)
- Shaker Raza — lead guitars (2007–present)
- Andrew Michael Gomes — bass guitars (2007–present)
- Rafatul Bari Labib — drums (2007–present)
- Ishmamul Farhad — lead guitars (2016–present)

== See also ==
- Rock music of Bangladesh
