= Shafiq Tuhin =

Bangladeshi lyricist, music director

- শফিক তুহিন
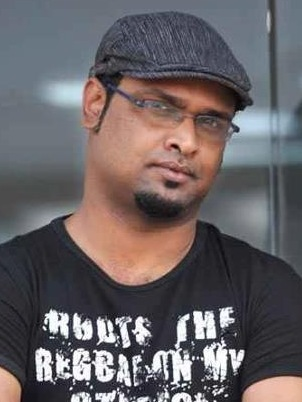
- Tuhin in 2014
- Born: A K M Shafiqur Rahman Tuhin; 27 July 1976 (age 50)
- Education: Science College; University of Dhaka
- Occupations: Lyricist, music director
- Awards: Bangladesh National Film Awards (2011)

A K M Shafiqur Rahman Tuhin (known as Shafiq Tuhin; born 27 July 1976) is a Bangladeshi lyricist, music director and singer. As of 2012, he wrote about 1,000 songs. He earned the Bangladesh National Film Award for Best Lyrics for the song Choto Choto Golpo in the film Projapoti (2011) and Citycell-Channel-I Music Award in 2006, 2011 and 2013.

== Background and career ==
Tuhin started writing lyrics in 1995. His first written song was sung by singer Shakila Zafar. In 2001, just after graduating from the University of Dhaka, he chose lyric writing as his career.

Tuhin has written songs for other singers including Runa Laila, Sabina Yasmin, Shahnaz Rahmatullah, Tapan Chowdhury and Kumar Bishwajit.

In 2012, Tuhin debuted in composing tune and lyrics for films through Onnorokom Bhalobasha.

== Albums ==
Solo

- Shopno Abong Tumi (2010)
- Shafiq Tuhin Dot Com
- Pobitro Prem (2013)
- Anguley Angul
- Chupkotha Rupkotha (2016)

Duet

- Paglami (2012)

== Awards ==
- Bangladesh National Film Award for Best Lyrics (2011)
- Channel I-Citycell Music Award (2006, 2011, 2013)
- Bangladesh Film Journalists Association Award-2002
- CJFB Performance Award-2004
