= Sania Sultana Liza =

Bangladeshi singer

Sania Sultana Liza সানিয়া সুলতানা লিজা
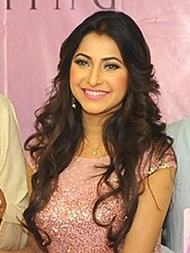
- Liza in 2015

Background information
- Genres: Modern, Melodious, Pop, Film Score
- Occupation: Singer
- Instrument: Vocal
- Years active: 2008–present
- Labels: G-Series, CMV Music, Dhruba Music Station
- Spouse: Shobuj Khandakar (m. 2022)

Sania Sultana Liza is a Bangladeshi singer. Her songs have been featured in different albums and films. She was the winner of the musical reality show Close Up-1 at NTV in 2008. She is known for several popular songs, including Bhul Kore Jodi, Pagli Suraiya, Pakhi, Jabi Koto Dure, Moner Angina, Eito Bhalobash, Baroti Mashe and Amar Jodi Thakto Dana. These works have helped her establish a distinctive presence in the Bangladeshi music industry. She served as the chief judge of the reality singing competition Gola Chhere Gao, the second season of RTV's Young Star, which aired in 2023. She later served as a chief judge on RTV's children's music reality show Little Star, serving as a judge for both its first season in 2025 and second season in 2026, which were themed Agamir Konthoshor.

== Background and career ==
Liza took up singing lessons at the age of seven; her first teacher was M.A. Hye, who taught her the basics. Afterward, she learned lessons from Anwar Hossain Anu, a teacher of Mymensingh Shilpakala Academy. He taught her classical and modern songs. Her participation in the media started in 2004 through performing in the Notun Kuri competition at Bangladesh Television.

She passed SSC in 2008 from Gouripur Pilot Girls High School from the commerce group. She passed HSC in 2010 from Shahid Syed Nazrul Islam College, Mymensingh. She completed her BBA from Daffodil International University in 2015.

Liza participated in music and sports at high school and during brief periods at college in Mymensingh and later around the world. In 2004, she achieved the position of "runner-up" in badminton of Jatiyo Shishu Kriya Protijogita based on age. She was the "champion" in badminton based on the age of Jatiyo Shishu Kriya Protijogita in the greater Mymensingh district for six years (2005–2010). She also got "silver medal" in Hamdth – Nath competition based on age which is arranged by Islamic Foundation Bangladesh in 2006. She received the "gold medal" in the National Music Competition and Jatiyo Shishu Polli Geeti Competition in 2006.

== Close Up-1 ==
In 2008, the third talent hunt organized by Closeup1 was held. The contest began in June and around 86,000 contestants were selected in the primary rounds from all over the country. From them, 541 got the opportunity to take part in the main contest. At the third selection, 115 were selected. From the 115,042 were singled out. Out of 42, only the top 12 were chosen. Liza was the winner of Close Up-1.

On December 17, the grand finale of "CloseUp1: Tomakei Khujchhey Bangladesh 2008" was held. The winner was selected based on a point system that included both marks given by the judges and public votes (through SMS). As the winner, Liza received 1 million Bangladeshi taka ($14,500 as of December 2008) and a car.

== Music career ==
In 2008, Liza won the musical talent hunt, Close Up-1. Liza's first solo album, Tausif ft Liza Part 1, was released on 12 July 2012. Her second solo album, Pagli Suraiya was released on 17 July 2015. Liza also did playback in over 50 Bangladeshi films. She has sung on over 50 mixed albums. She is the first Bangladeshi female singer that her music video on aired on UK-based Bollywood music channel B4U Music.

Liza is also a TV host in Bangladesh. She has hosted over 10 regular TV shows about music on Bangladeshi satellite TV channels. Liza take on the role of chief judge in the reality show, RTV's 'Young Star Season 2, 2023' themed 'Gola Chhere Gao. She also served as a chief judge on the children's music reality show RTV's Little Star 2025 & 2026, themed Agamir Konthoshor.

== Personal life ==
Liza has been married to Shobuj Khandakar, a Bangladeshi businessman residing in the United States, since December 2022. She gave birth to a daughter in New York on 17 March 2024.

== Solo albums ==
Year	Album	Co-Artists	Composer	Lyricist	Label
2012	Tausif ft Liza Part-1	Tausif	Tausif	Tausif, Robiul Islam Jibon, Faisal Rabbikin, RA Sujon, Milon & Sarower Sumon	G-Series
2015	Pagli Suraiya	Asif Akbar, Arfin Rumey	Naquib Khan, Foad Nasser Babu, Musfiq Litu, Jk Majlish, Arfin Rumey, Belal Khan, ZooEl Morshed	Robiul Islam Jibon, Shafiq Tuhin, Zahid Akbar, Sudip Kumar Dip, Mehfuz Al Fahad, Tushar	Deadline Music

== Filmography ==
- Eito Bhalobasha (2012)
- O Amar Desher Mati (2012)
- Taarkata (2014)
- Cheleti Abol Tabol Meyeti Pagol Pagol (2015)
- Bhola To Jay Na Tare (2015)
- Aina Shundory (2015)
- Sultana Bibiana (2017)
- Gohin Baluchor (2017)
- Abbas (2019)
- Joy Nogorer Jomidar (2020)
- Shoshurbari Zindabad 2 (2022)
- Adom (2023)
- Briddhashram (2023)
- Abar Hothat Brishti (2026)
- Kolonko (2026)

=== Singles ===
Year	Title	Label/YouTube Channel	Director	Music Director	Lyrics	Reference
2017	Bhalobashi Bola Hoye Jaak	CMV Music	Shahrear Polock	Belal Khan	Isteaque Ahmed	
2018	Asmani	Rtv Music	Sohel Rana Bidduth	Shafiq Tuhin	Shafiq Tuhin	
2019	Ek Jamuna	Hw Production	Hw Production	Habib Wahid	Faujia Sultana Poly	
2019	Pran Jure	Liza	Aabid Hasan	Arfin Rumey	Zahid Akbar	
2019	Ek Brishtite	Liza	Aabid Hasan	Autumnal Moon	Autumnal Moon	
2019	Tomar Smrity Tuku	Dhruba Music Station	Vicky Zahed	Akassh & Sajid Sarker	Robiul Islam Jibon	
2020	Bhabna with Hridoy Khan	HK Production	HK Production	Hridoy Khan	Hridoy Khan	
2021	Bangla Bhasha	Liza	Aabid Hasan	Suman Kalyan & Anwar Hossen Anu	Nurul Islam Manik	
2021	Pakhi with Belal Khan	BK Production	Raj Biswas Sankor	Belal Khan & Din Islam Sharuk	Musa K Mahamud	
2022	Chai Tomay	Liza	Sania Sultana Liza	Naved Parvez	Shimul SB	
2022	Ferena Harano Dingulo with Asif Akbar	ARB Entertainment	Yamin Elan	Kabir Suman	Kabir Suman	
2023	Bhalobasha Noy Sheki	Liza	Raj Biswas Sankor	Nazir Mahmud & Musfiq Litu	Lalon Lohani	
2023	Jotone with Muhin Khan	Muhin	Rashid Polash	Sujon Arif	Habib Siraji Babbu	
2023	Tumi Je Amar Shadhinota	Liza	Raj Biswas Sankor	Suman Kalyan & Anwar Hossen Anu	Nurul Islam Manik	
2024	Purnima Chad	Liza	Raj Biswas Sankor	Naquib Khan & Foad Nasser Babu	Dr. Shoeb Ahmed	
2024	Baba Tumi Amar with Rafiqul Alam (singer)	Liza	Ahmed Sushmoy	Foad Nasser Babu	Samina Salam	
2024	Valobashbo Sudhu Tomay with Belal Khan	Sultan Entertainment	Mahmud Mahin	Belal Khan	Ahmed Risvy	
2025	Premer Kabbo Hobe Churanto with Robi Chowdhury	Fagun Audio Vision	Hanif Sanket	Kishore Das	Liton Adhikary Rintu	
2025	Tita Kotha with Samz & Rizan	SF Multimedia	Sabbir Ahmed MS	Samz & Adib Kabir	Samz	
2025	Tumi Ele	Liza	Raj Biswas Sankor	Faisal Ahmed & Meer Masum	Nurul Islam Manik	
2025	O Priyo Valobasa Nio with Kishore Das	Kishore Das	W.A.S (GALGOPPO)	Kishore Das	Kishore Das	
2025	O Bangladesh Swadhin Bangladesh with Sabina Yasmin & Syed Abdul Hadi	Fagun Audio Vision	Hanif Sanket	Shouquat Ali Imon	Mohammad Rafiquzzaman	
2025	Kono Kotha Nei with Kishore Das	Fagun Audio Vision	Hanif Sanket	Kishore Das	Kishore Das	
2025	Nei Odhikar	Liza	Chandan Roy Chowdhury	Hridoy Khan	Towfique Ahmed	
2025	Amra Shobai Bangladesh with Jahid Antu, Anik Sutradhar, Adiba Kamal, Ankita Mallick, Arindal Antor & Dipannita Shithe	Liza	Raj Biswas Sankor	Emon Saha	Kabir Bakul	
2026	Bhalobasha Keno Je Emon Hoy with Belal Khan	Belal Khan	Ador Mirza	Belal Khan	Sohodeb Saha	
2026	Tomar Rodela Akashe with Anik Sutradhar	Belal Khan	Raj Biswas Sankor	Nazir Mahmud	Lalon Lohana	
2026	Godhuli Logon	Syeda Hema	TeamWork	Hridoy Hasin	Syeda Hema	
2026	Tumi Bihon	Liza	Raj Biswas Sankor	Jisan Khan Shuvo	Jisan Khan Shuvo	

== Awards ==
- 2008– Close Up-1(Champion)
- 2014– AJFB Awards (Best Singer Female)
- 2015– Dallywood Awards (Best Singer Female)
- 2022– Star Plus Communication Awards (Best Singer Female)
- 2025– Channel i Music Awards (Best Singer for Modern Song)
