= Nolok Babu =

- Origin: Jamalpur, Bangladesh
- Genres: Folk
- Occupation: Singer
- Instrument: Singing
- Years active: 2005–present
- Label: NTV
- Website: www.nolokbabu.com

Nolok Babu (Bengali: নোলক বাবু) is a Bangladeshi singer. He won the first CloseUp1 competition (an adaptation of Pop Idol), a TV show to decide the best new young singer based on voting and participation.

== Early life ==
Nolok was born in Jamalpur. His family name was Farhad. He grew up in a poor family and struggled hard. He had no opportunity to get formal training. However, he got some assistance in Jamalpur Shilpakala academy (Musical Academy). His mother was the bread earner of his family, and when his mother very sick he collected funds by singing in trains.

In 2005, when CloseUp started Farhad registered his name as Nolok Babu.

== Close Up1 ==
In the selection round, he came into notice with "Sua Chan Pakhi", a popular song of late folk musician, Ukil Munsi. In the next rounds, he performed "Amar gaye joto dukkho soy", "Megh bhanga Rod", "Keno ei Nissongota", "Tara bhora rate" and "Ma go Bhabna keno".

== Solo albums ==
=== Dui Chokher Kadon (2008) ===
- Amar Maje Bilin Tumi
- Bhalobasar Durbhikkho
- Dui Chokher Kandon
- Dukkho Debe Kare
- Eto Bhalo Mon
- Eto Rup Onge
- Keu Base Na
- Koto Jontrona Kine Kine
- Matire Mati
- Naire Porokaal
- Nijer Kadhe Nijer Lash
- Oporadhi

=== She Je Konya Bhalo (2006) ===
- Ami Tomay Pabo
- Jar Shonge Chilona Porichoy
- Maa Re Behest Tumi
- Mon Pakhi
- O Amar Chokhu Nai
- Oi Durer Gaye
- Ontorer Bhitor
- Prem Jare Khuje Fere
- She Je Konna Bhalo
- Shopno Maye

== Criticism ==
Nolok was criticized for his rapid change of lifestyle and rude behaviour.

- In 2007 he beat a passer-by in the street and was jailed for few days.
- In 2013 Nolok was handed over to police for misbehaviour with an air hostess.
