= Ashim Saha =

Bangladeshi poet and novelist (1949–2024)

Asim Saha
- অসীম সাহা
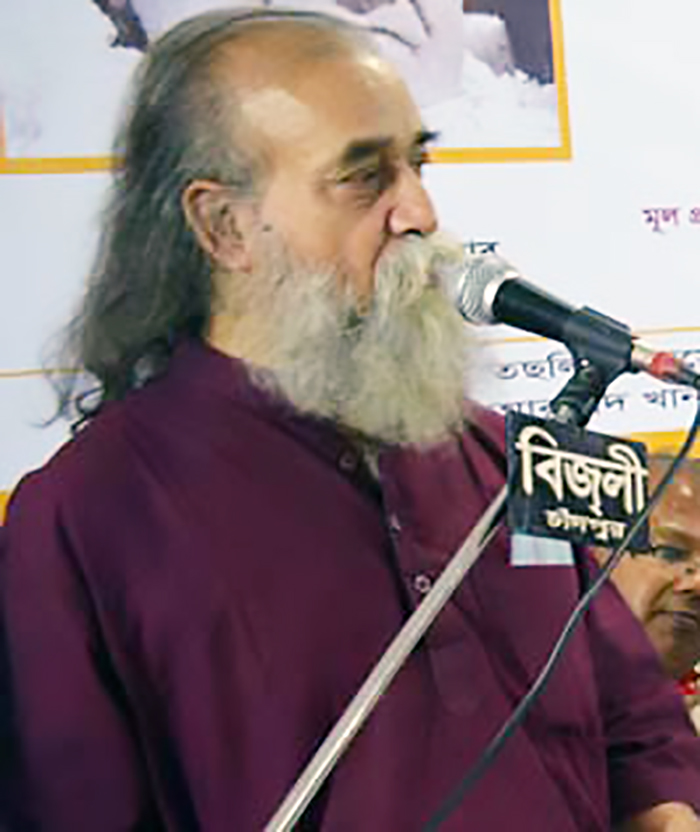
- Saha in 2014
- Born: 20 February 1949; Netrokona district, Dhaka Division, East Bengal, Pakistan
- Died: 18 June 2024 (aged 75); Dhaka, Bangladesh
- Occupations: Poet, novelist
- Awards: Bangla Academy Literary Award; Ekushey Padak

Asim Saha (20 February 1949 – 18 June 2024) was a Bangladeshi poet and novelist. He received the Bangla Academy Literary Award in 2011 for his contributions to poetry. In recognition of his contribution to the Bengali language and literature, the government of Bangladesh awarded him the country's second-highest civilian award, the Ekushey Padak, in 2019.

== Life and career ==
Saha was born on 20 February 1949 in his uncle's house in Netrokona district of the then East Bengal (now Bangladesh). His paternal residence was in Shivalaya Upazila of Manikganj District. His father, Akhil Buddha Saha, was a professor.

Saha's writing career started in 1964. He completed his Secondary education in 1965 and Higher Secondary education from Madaripur Government Nazimuddin College in 1967. In 1973, he obtained his post-graduate degree from the University of Dhaka.

Saha died on 18 June 2024, while undergoing treatment at Bangabandhu Sheikh Mujib Medical University (BSMMU). He was 75.
