= Charu =

Sanskrit word and name

चारु
- Romanisation: Chāru
- Gender: Male and Female
- Language: Sanskrit

Origin
- Meaning: Sweet

Charu is a Sanskrit word that means 'sweet'.

== Name ==
Charu is a popular name given to Hindu women and men. Notable people with the name Charu include:

- Charu Majumdar: The founder of Naxalbari uprising in India
- Charulata: Eponymous protagonist of Satyajit Ray's movie

== Other meanings ==
In Sanskrit, charu is the name of a flower.

Charu is a sweet porridge-like foodstuff offered as ahuti (offering) in the Yajnas.

Charu Hasini, or 'sweet smiler', is an epithet of the goddess Rukmini.

In Telugu, the dish rasam is known as charu. In Kannada, it is known as saru or sar.
