= Science College =

Science College may refer to:

- Science College, Mount Lavinia, Sri Lanka
- Science College, Kokrajhar, Assam, India
- Science College, Brunei
- Science College, Patna, Bihar, India
- Science College (United Kingdom specialist schools programme)
