= Stoic Bliss =

Bangladeshi hip hop group

- Origin: Queens, New York, U.S.
- Genres: Rap; hip hop
- Years active: 2004–present
- Label: G-Series
- Members: Ac1d; Lit Slick; Lowkey B
- Past members: Kazi; Silma; Xtro; B1shop; Tizzy Montana; Rul; Fly; Mana

Stoic Bliss (SB) is a Bangladeshi-American hip hop group known for blending hip hop and Bengali music. The group was formed in Queens, New York, in 2004 by members Kazi Rahman and Ac1d. Stoic Bliss is credited with popularizing rap music in Bangladesh. They gained prominence with their debut album, Light Years Ahead (2006), which featured the hit single "Abar Jigay". Since then, they have released several albums and singles, including Kolponar Baire (2007) and Bangali Bangali (2022).

== History ==
Stoic Bliss began their journey when they collaborated with local producers AQ Finest and DJ DEPIC, who produced most of their early tracks. They were the first group to introduce hip-hop to Bangladesh through blogs before the rise of social media, quickly gaining popularity in the underground music scene. They paved the way for emerging Bengali rap artists, creating a platform for sharing hip-hop music. After their first album, internal disputes and lack of contract transparency led to the departure of Xtro, B1shop, Tizzy, Rul, Mana, and Fly from the group.

Their debut album, Light Years Ahead (আলোক বর্ষ দূরে), was released in Bangladesh in June 2006. The album featured early members Kazi, Ac1d, Xtro, B1shop, Tizzy Montana, Rul, Fly, and Mana.

The single Abar Jigay propelled the group to mainstream popularity among Bengali-speaking audiences. Light Years Ahead sold over 250,000 copies within the first 10 months, establishing Stoic Bliss as a mainstream music group in Bangladesh. Other popular tracks from the album included Mayabi Chokh, Shesh Barer Moto, and Chow Mei Fun.

In 2007, Stoic Bliss released their second album, Kolponar Baire (Beyond the Imagination), where Kazi took on the lead vocalist role and Ac1d became the lead rapper, forming a powerful duo. The album featured songs like Raatri Jaga, Ei Je Ami, and Shomoyer Palki. The recreation of their hit single, Abar Abar Jigay, solidified their status as the pioneers of Bangla hip-hop. Ac1d also gained significant recognition with solo tracks like Ac1d Ke, Amar Bondhu Bonduk, Pura Ura Dhura, and Fire Like A Dragon, which amassed over 1,000,000 views on YouTube.

Following their second album, the group temporarily disappeared from the music scene due to disputes with their record label over publishing rights and a lack of brand sponsorship. During this time, Ac1d pursued a solo career in the American music industry, releasing mixtapes and music videos that gained traction on YouTube. Despite their hiatus, their early music continued to stream to millions of listeners who recognized them as the pioneers of Bangla Rap.

Stoic Bliss made an unexpected return in 2017, introducing two new members, Lit Slick and Silma. With the support of their childhood friend and manager, Sanjin Rana, they began releasing singles from their long-anticipated third album, Stoic Bliss 3, reigniting their fan base.

In 2021, despite the COVID-19 pandemic, Stoic Bliss continued releasing new content with their latest producer, along with high-quality music videos on YouTube. They now have a dedicated fan base of millions of Bengali listeners. The group has hinted at an upcoming major-label release for their long-awaited third album, with plans to reclaim their place in the Bengali music industry on an international scale.

In 2025, Stoic Bliss experienced a significant lineup change when their lead singer, founder, and first Bengali female artist, Silma, unexpectedly departed from the group for undisclosed reasons. This left Ac1d and Lit Slick in an uncertain position; however, they remained committed to continuing the group's legacy. Following internal discussions, they recruited a new lead Bengali singer, rapper, and composer, Lowkey B. The newly restructured group released their first hit single together, Bolo K, on Valentine's Day.

In an informal interview, Ac1d commented on the transition, stating, "We were placed in a position where we had to make a strategic decision. We had come too far to let our momentum fade. We needed a singer to replace Kazi, and Lowkey B happened to be in the right place at the right time. Everything naturally fell into place from there."

With their rebranded lineup and an ever growing global fanbase, Stoic Bliss adapted to the evolving music landscape while maintaining their original supporters and expanding their reach to the Gen Z audience. Despite receiving multiple offers from major record labels, the group chose to remain independent, continuing to release music that has consistently stood the test of time.

== Discography ==
Studio albums

- Light Years Ahead (2006)
- Kolponar Baire (2007)
- Bangali Bangali (2022)
- Aushimito (2022)
- Dubche Sriti (2024)
