= Pagli Suraiya =

Studio album by Sania Sultana Liza
- Released: 2015
- Genre: Modern; Modern Classical; Melodious; Pop
- Language: Bengali
- Label: Deadline Music

Sania Sultana Liza chronology
Liza Part-1 (2012)	Pagli Suraiya (2015)

Sania Sultana Liza chronology
Liza Part-1 (2012)	Pagli Suraiya (2015)

Pagli Suraiya is Sania Sultana Liza's second solo album and was released on 17 July 2015.

== Track listing ==
No.	Title	Length
1.	"Tumi Ashbe Bole"
2.	"Jabi Koto Dure with Asif Akbar"
3.	"Chai Ni Emon Kore"
4.	"Pran Jure Rekhechi Tomay with Arfin Rumey"
5.	"Akash Jure"
6.	"Moner Ghore"
7.	"Suraiya"
8.	"Baroti Mashe"
9.	"Asmani"
10.	"Jabi Koto Dure Solo"
11.	"Pran Jure Rekhechi Tomay Solo"
