= Channel i Music Awards =

Annual award

- Location: Dhaka
- Country: Bangladesh

Television/radio coverage
- Network: Channel i
- Runtime: 2006–present

Channel i Music Awards is a musical award annually given by Channel i. It has been given every year since 2006.

On 1 October 2017, the award's 12th edition took place, with awards presented in 18 categories. Khurshid Alam was awarded lifetime achievement award and Ali Hossain, Alauddin Ali and Alam Khan were awarded with special honor for their lifetime contribution to music. In 15th channel i music awards 2020, popular pop singer Ferdous Wahid awarded lifetime achievement award. Popular folk singer Sayera Reza was awarded as the best folk singer for the song "Dosh Dibona" penned by Anurup Aich and composed by JK Majlish and popular music director JK Majlish was awarded as the best music director (modern) in the same year, for the song "Baroti Mashe" from the album Pagli Suraiya sang by Sania Sultana Liza.

== Categories ==
=== Critics awards ===
- Best Rabindra Sangeet Singer
- Best Nazrul Sangeet Singer
- Best People's Song: Shofi Mondol
- Best Modern Singer
- Best Novice Singer
- Best Music director
- Best lyricist: Asif Iqbal
- Best Music video: Tanim Rahman Angshu
- Best Cover Design
- Best Sound Engineer
- Best Classical Music Singer
- Best Band
- Best Playback Singer

=== Popular choice awards ===
- Best Modern Singer
- Best Novice Singer
- Best Band
- Best Playback Singer
- Best Music Video

== Events ==
- 1st Channel i Music Awards - 2006
- 2nd Channel i Music Awards - 2007
- 3rd Channel i Music Awards - 2008
- 4th Channel i Music Awards - 2009
- 5th Channel i Music Awards - 2010
- 6th Channel i Music Awards - 2011
- 7th Channel i Music Awards - 2012
- 8th Channel i Music Awards - 2013
- 9th Channel i Music Awards - 2014
- 10th Channel i Music Awards - 2015
- 11th Channel i Music Awards - 2016
- 12th Channel i Music Awards - 2017
- 13th Channel i Music Awards - 2018
- 14th Channel i Music Awards - 2019
- 15th Channel i Music Awards - 2020
- 16th Channel i Music Awards - 2021
- 17th Channel i Music Awards - 2022
- 18th Channel i Music Awards - 2023
- 19th channel i music awards - 2024
