= Kamal Dasgupta discography =

Kamal Dasgupta (28 July 1912 – 20 July 1974), also known as Kamal Uddin Ahamed, was a Bangla music director, composer and folk artist. Rāga and Thumri were the main elements of his music. His wife Feroza Begum was a noted Nazrul Sangeet singer. Their second and third sons Hamin Ahmed and Shafin Ahmed are the lead singers with Bangladeshi Band Miles. Thwle following is the complete list of films he scored:

== 1930s ==
| Year | Film | Language | Notes |
|---|---|---|---|
| 1936 | Pandit Mashi | Bengali | |

== 1940s ==
| Year | Film | Language | Notes |
|---|---|---|---|
| 1940 | Kitna Dukh Bhulaya Tumne | Hindi | |
| 1942 | Garmil | Bengali | |
| 1942 | Jawab | Hindi | |
| 1942 | Shesh Uttar | Bengali | |
| 1943 | Hospital | Hindi | |
| 1943 | Jogajog | Bengali | |
| 1943 | Rani | Hindi | |
| 1943 | Sahadharmini | Bengali | |
| 1944 | Bideshini | Bengali | |
| 1944 | Chander Kalanko | Bengali | |
| 1944 | Dampati | Bengali | |
| 1944 | Nandita | Bengali | |
| 1945 | Bhabi Kaal | Bengali | |
| 1945 | Bhala Tha Kitna Apna Bachpan | Hindi | |
| 1945 | Main Saaz Bajaun Tum Gaao | Hindi | |
| 1945 | Meghdoot | Hindi | |
| 1946 | Arabian Nights | Hindi | |
| 1946 | Bindiya | Hindi | |
| 1946 | Krishna Leela | Hindi | |
| 1946 | Pehchan | Hindi | |
| 1946 | Prem Ki Duniya | Hindi | |
| 1946 | Zameen Aasman | Hindi | |
| 1947 | Faisla | Hindi | |
| 1947 | Giribala | Hindi | |
| 1948 | Chandrashekhar | Hindi | |
| 1948 | Manmani | Hindi | |
| 1948 | Rangamati | Bengali | |
| 1948 | Vijay Yatra | Hindi | |
| 1949 | Iran Ki Ek Raat | Hindi | |
| 1949 | Sankalpo | Bengali | |

== 1950s ==
| Year | Film | Language | Notes |
|---|---|---|---|
| 1950 | Anuradha | Bengali | |
| 1951 | Phulwari | Hindi | |
| 1952 | Malancha | Bengali | |
| 1953 | Prarthana | Bengali | |
| 1953 | Bhagwan Sri Krishna Chataniya | Bengali | |
| 1953 | Sandhan | Bengali | |
| 1954 | Nabibidhan | Bengali | |
| 1955 | Bratacharini | Bengali | |
| 1956 | Maan Rokkha | Bengali | |
| 1956 | Govindadas | Bengali | |
| 1956 | Madhu Malati | Bengali | |

== 1960s ==
| Year | Film | Notes |
|---|---|---|
| 1966 | Badhubaran | |

== Non-film Albums ==
| Year | Album/Single | Notes |
|---|---|---|
| 1941 | Mon Niye Priyo (Single) | sung by Shanta Apte |
| 1975 | Down Memory Lane : Music of Kamal Dasgupta | |
| 1980 | Geets of Hemant Kumar | |
| 1986 | Sabar Priya Gaan | |
| 1999 | Millennium Bengali Various Artists : Volume 2 | |
| 1999 | Millennium Bengali Various Artists : Volume 2 | |
| 2012 | Tribute To Kamal Dasgupta | |
| 2020 | Ami Bonophool Go | |
| 2020 | Hits of Kanan Devi | |
| 2020 | Laguk Dola | |
| 2020 | Kanan Devi 4 Pack | |
| N/A | Chaudhvin Manzil Pe Jaalim Aa Gaya (Single) | sung by Talat Mahmud |
| N/A | Tasveer Teri Dil Mera Behla Na Sakegi (Single) | sung by Talat Mahmud |
| N/A | Madhuban Mein Na Shyam Bulao (Single) | sung by Hemant Kumar |
| N/A | O Preet Nibhanewali (Single) | sung by Hemant Kumar |
| N/A | Nasim-e-Ku-e-Yaar Aaye Na Aaye (Single) | |
