= Kaniz Suborna =

- কানিজ সুবর্ণা
- Spouses: Hamin Ahmed (m. 2008)
- Musical career
- Genres: Pop
- Occupation: Singer
- Instrument: Vocals
- Years active: 2000–present

Kaniz Suborna is a Bangladeshi pop singer. Her notable songs include Tumi Nissho Kore Dao, Sha La La La, Eito Ami Tomar Achi, and Bhalobashi Jare. As of 2022, she has released five music albums.

== Career ==
Suborna entered the music industry with the help of rock singer Ayub Bachchu. She got her breakthrough with the album "Bhalobasha Mane", tuned and composed by Bachchu in early 2000.

In 2004, Suborna went on tour performing in Belgium, Austria and Italy, along with Kumar Biswajit, and Fakir Alamgir.

In 2009, Suborna served as a judge of a television reality talent show Nachey Gaaney Number One, along with Prince Mahmud and Hamin Ahmed. aired on Ekushey TV.

Subrona performed on television shows like "Mon-e Laage Dola" (2010) on NTV and "Surer Bhuban" on ATN Bangla (2004).

In December 2015, Suborna appeared on a music video titled Sara Dao Na.

In May 2022, Suborna made her acting debut with the film "Shubornobhumi" directed by Zahid Hossain Earlier she had made a guest appearance at Moner Ghore Boshot Kore (2010).

In June 2022, after 7 years of hiatus, Suborna released a song "Maya". It was composed and written by Tanvir Tareq.

== Personal life ==
Suborna married Hamin Ahmed, a member of the musical band Miles, on April 22, 2008. Together they have two sons – Ayman Amir Ahmed and Azman Aryan Ahmed who are autistic. Suborna's parents and siblings live in New York. Her maternal uncle, Kudrat E Khoda, is the owner of a film production house, Revolutions Movies International.
