= Satish Vyas =

Satish Vyas may refer to:

- Satish Vyas (musician), Indian santoor player
- Satish Vyas (actor), Indian actor
