= Kamal Dasgupta =

Bangladeshi singer and composer (1912–1974)

Kamal Uddin Ahmed
- কামাল উদ্দিন আহমেদ
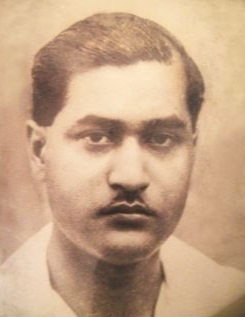
- Born: 28 July 1912; Kalia, Narail, Bengal Presidency, British India
- Died: 20 July 1974 (aged 62); Dhaka, Bangladesh
- Other name: Kamal Dasgupta
- Occupations: Composer, music director, folk singer
- Spouse: Firoza Begum (m. 1955)
- Children: Tahsin Ahmed; Hamin Ahmed; Shafin Ahmed
- Relatives: Bimal Das Gupta (Brother)

Kanan Devi singing "Ami Banaphul Go"
Lyricist Pronab Roy, Composer Kamal Dasgupta From the 1942 film Shesh Uttar

Kamal Dasgupta (later Kamal Uddin Ahmed) (28 July 1911 – 20 July 1974), was a Bangladeshi Bengali music director, lyricist, composer and folk artist active in Hindi and Bengali cinema especially in pre-partition British India. Rāga and thumri were the main elements of his music. An ardent lover of Nazrulgeeti (the music of Kazi Nazrul Islam, National Poet of Bangladesh), he was immensely successful professionally, and in the early forties, was anecdotally reputed to have paid 35,000 to 40,000 rupees as income tax. On the other hand, a true humanitarian, during the Great Bengal Famine, when ten lakh starving and dispossessed people descended upon Calcutta, he opened langarkhanas (mass kitchens) and nearly spent the vast majority of his fortune to feed the needy and destitute. While in Calcutta, he lived in Tollygunge with his family.

He later married Feroza Begum, a noted Nazrul Sangeet singer. Their second and third sons Hamin Ahmed and Shafin Ahmed were the lead singers with Bangladeshi band Miles.

== Early life and education ==
Kamal Ahmed was born Kamal Dasgupta into Baidya Brahmin family on 28 July 1911 in Narail, Jessore of the then British India. He matriculated in 1928 from Calcutta Academy and later completed B.Com. from Comilla Victoria Government College. He earned his doctorate in music from Banaras Hindu University in 1943 for his work on Meerabai, the composer and singer of Bhajans. His early inspiration came from his father, Tara Prasanna Dasgupta. He took his first music lessons from his brother, Bimal Das Gupta. Later he studied under Dilip Kumar Roy, K C Dey (Kana Keshto), and Jamiruddin Khan.

== Career ==
Dasgupta sang modern songs in Bengali, Urdu, Hindi, and Tamil. He was also a composer, composing the music for about eight thousand songs. His work was based on classical music and tended towards the Thungri style, though he also drew inspiration from other sources.

Dasgupta composed the music for about eighty Bangla films, among them Tufan Mail, Jhamelar Prem, Ei Ki Go Shes Dan. His last film as a music director was Badhu Bharan (1967). He also composed the background music for an American film, War Propaganda. His active life as a composer covered about fourteen years. His unique contribution in music is his invention of a shorthand method for swaralipi (notations).

In 1935, Dasgupta joined the Gramophone Company of India as a music director. During his term there, he developed a close association with Kazi Nazrul Islam and composed the music for almost four hundred of his songs. The gramophone records for which Dasgupta composed music were notable in the 1950s and 1960s. Among his songs still notable today are Sanjher Taraka Ami (I am the star of twilight), Prithivi Amare Chay (The world needs me), and Ami Bhorer Juthika (I am the jasmine of morning).

Dasgupta died on 18 July 1974 in Dhaka.

== Discography ==
=== Hindi ===
- Mrhospital
- Jawab (1942)
- Hospital (1943)
- Rani (1943)
- Megdoot (1945)
- Arabian Nights (1946)
- Bindiya (1946)
- Krishan Leela (1946)
- Zamin Aasman (1946)
- Faisla (with Anupam Ghatak) (1947)
- Gribala (1947)
- Manmani (1947)
- Chander Shekhar (1948)
- Iran Ki Ek Raat (1949)
- Phulwari (1951)

=== Bengali ===
- Pandit Mashi (1936)
- Shesh Uttar (1942)
- Garmil (1942)
- Sahadharmini (1943)
- Joga jog (1943)
- Chandar Kalnka (1944)
- Dhampati (1944)
- Bideshni (1944)
- Nandita (1944)
- Megdoot (1945)
- Bhabi kaal (1945)
- Rangamati (1948)
- Anuradha (1949)
- Malancha (1952)
- Prarthana (1953)
- Bhagwan Sri Krishna Chataniya (1953)
- Sandhan (1953)
- Nabibidhan (1954)
- Bratacharini (1955)
- Manraksha (1956)
- Govindadas (1956)
- Madhu Malati (1956)
- Bodhu Baran (1967)
