= Ragni (actress) =

Pakistani actress (1925-2007)

- راگنی
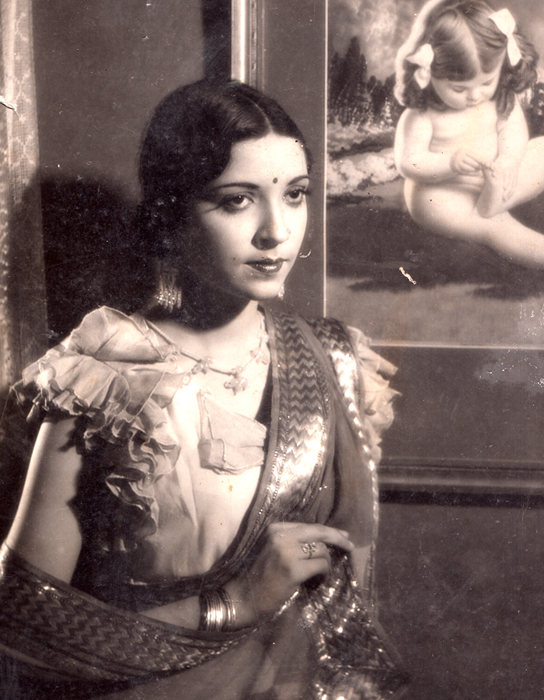
- Ragni in the early 1940s
- Born: Irshad Begum; 22 October 1925; Gujranwala, Punjab, British India
- Died: 27 February 2007 (aged 81); Lahore, Punjab, Pakistan
- Resting place: Gulberg gaveyard Lahore
- Other name: Almond-eyed Beauty
- Occupation: Actress
- Years active: 1940 – 1983
- Spouses: Mohammad Aslam (married and divorced Muhammad Aslam in the 1940s) * S. Gul (married him in 1947 who died in 1999)
- Children: Abid (son); Saira (daughter)
- Parent: Diwan Parmanand (father)

Ragni (born Irshad Begum; 22 October 1924 – 27 February 2007), also known as Shaado, was a Pakistani actress. She worked in Urdu and Punjabi films under her stage name Ragni.

She also worked in Hindi films in the cinema of India. She was known as the almond-eyed beauty for her doe-like eyes. Ragni was considered to be the highest-paid actress of her time in the 1940s, being paid 1 lakh rupees by A.R. Kardar for her role in Shahjehan.

== Early life ==
Ragni was born as Irshad Begum in Gujranwala on 22 October 1925. Her mother died when Ragni was very young, and her father, Seth Diwan Parmanand, took her with him to Lahore, and they lived at a house on Fleming Road, Lahore, Pakistan. In Lahore, filmmaker Roshan Lal Shorey was a neighbour of Ragni and noticed her and convinced Diwan to let Ragni act in films.

== Career ==
She started her acting career in a film launched by Roop K. Shorey in the Punjabi film Dulla Bhatti (1940) alongside MD Kanwar. The film was a major success, and Ragni became a star overnight. Ragni went on to act in several Lahore- based productions in Hindi and Punjabi, like Sehti Murad (1941), Nishani (1942), Ravi Par (1942), Poonji (1943), Daasi (1944), and Kaise Kahun (1945).

In 1945, she left Lahore for Bombay and teamed up with A. R. Kardar. In 1946, she played the titular role in S. M. Yusuf's Nek Pervin. The film was successful at the box office and consolidated her position as a leading actress. Following the success of Nek Pervin, she was approached by Kardar to play Ruhi in Shahjehan. It is said that she was paid rupees one lakh for the film, making her the highest-paid actress of that time.

After Partition, Ragni chose to move to Pakistan but has also done a couple of Indian movies, which did not fare well.

In 1949, she worked in her first Punjabi film, Mundri (1949), with Ilyas Kashmiri. Then she worked in films Akaili, Nazrana, Baydari, Kundan, and Zanjeer. She also successfully performed a number of character roles in films such as Husn-o-Ishq, Gumnaam, Ghulam, Duniya Na Maane, Mirza Jat, and Aab-i-Hayat.

In 1958, she appeared as the antagonist 'Dilaram' in Anarkali with Noor Jehan and Shamim Ara. Later she worked in the film Noukar, which was a hit film. Ragni worked in a number of sixty films during her career that spanned some years.

== Personal life ==
Ragni married Mohammad Aslam in the early 1940s. The marriage did not last long, but she had two children from her first marriage, Saira and Abid. Ragni divorced him before the Independence of Pakistan in 1947. She again got married in Pakistan in 1947 to S. Gul, who produced and co-starred opposite her in Beqarar, and her son Abid died from cancer some years ago in the USA, and her daughter Saira got married and moved to Karachi.

== Illness and death ==
After the death of her husband, Ragni did not marry again and lived in Gulberg, although she remained in contact with her daughter Saira. Ragni was deeply sad about the death of her son, and it affected her health. Ragni was admitted to Services Hospital on Tuesday morning. She died on 27 February because she was in an extremely serious condition while she was in the hospital at age 82 in 2007.

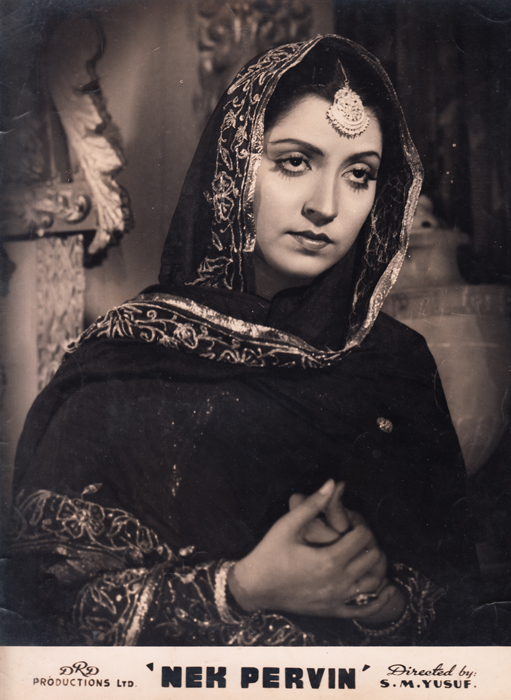
A Photo Lobby Card of Nek Pervin

== Filmography ==
=== Film ===
Year	Film	Language
1941	Dulla Bhatti	Punjabi
1941	Himmat	Hindi / Urdu
1941	Mera Mahi	Punjabi
1941	Sehti Murad	Punjabi
1942	Nishani	Hindi / Urdu
1942	Patwari	Punjabi
1942	Ravi Par	Punjabi
1943	Poonji	Hindi
1944	Dasi	Punjabi
1945	Shirin Farhad	Hindi / Urdu
1945	Dhamki	Hindi / Urdu
1945	Kaisay Kahun	Hindi / Urdu
1946	Nek Pervin	Hindi / Urdu
1946	Bindiya	Hindi / Urdu
1946	Shahjehan	Hindi / Urdu
1947	Manmani	Hindi / Urdu
1947	Farz	Hindi / Urdu
1948	Teri Yaad	Urdu
1949	Mundri	Punjabi
1950	Beqarar	Urdu
1950	Kundan	Urdu
1951	Akaely	Urdu
1953	Ghulam	Urdu
1954	Gumnam	Urdu
1955	Naukar	Urdu
1955	Shararey	Urdu
1955	Nazrana	Urdu
1955	Iltija	Urdu
1957	Bedari	Urdu
1958	Bahar	Urdu
1958	Anarkali	Urdu
1958	Mumtaz	Urdu
1960	Zanjeer	Urdu
1962	Husn-o-Ishq	Urdu
1963	Aurat Ek Kahani	Urdu
1964	Gehra Daagh	Urdu
1964	Haveli	Urdu
1964	Sher Di Bachi	Punjabi
1965	Saaz aur Awaz	Urdu
1965	Naila	Urdu
1966	Jalwa	Urdu
1966	Insan	Urdu
1966	Laado	Punjabi
1966	Banki Naar	Punjabi
1968	Baalam	Urdu
1968	Yaar Dost	Punjabi
1968	Asmat	Urdu
1968	Sonay Ki Chirya	Urdu
1968	Saiqa	Urdu
1968	Chann 14vin Da	Punjabi
1968	Taj Mahal	Urdu
1969	Dildar	Punjabi
1969	Sheran Di Jori	Punjabi
1969	Meri Bhabhi	Urdu
1969	Naaz	Urdu
1969	Dulla Haidri	Punjabi
1969	Tahadi Izzat Da Sawal A	Punjabi
1970	Sayyan	Punjabi
1970	Charda Suraj	Punjabi
1971	Ucha Naa Pyar Da	Punjabi
1971	Dunya Na Manay	Urdu
1971	Ucha Naa Pyar Da	Punjabi
1972	Khalish	Urdu
1972	Sabaq	Urdu
1972	Puttar Hattan Tay Nein Wikday	Punjabi
1972	Sultan	Punjabi
1973	Farz	Urdu
1973	Jhalli	Punjabi
1974	Ishq Mera Naa	Punjabi
1974	Sidha Rasta	Punjabi
1977	Aina	Urdu
1980	Haseena Maan Jaye Gi	Urdu
1983	Ab-e-Hayat	Pashto
