= Firoza Begum (singer) =

Bangladeshi singer (1930–2014)

Feroza Begum
- ফিরোজা বেগম
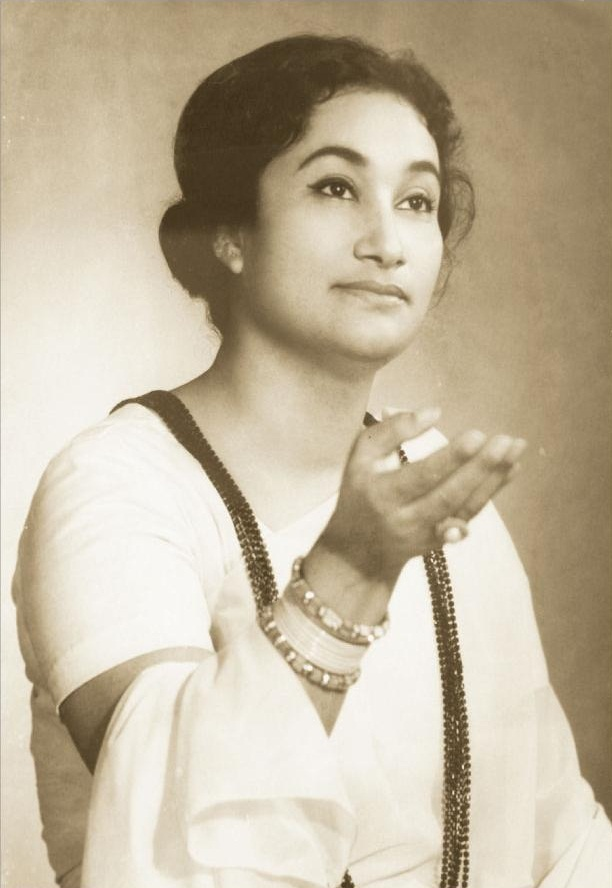
- Begum in 1955
- Born: 28 July 1930; Faridpur, Bengal Presidency, British India
- Died: 9 September 2014 (aged 84); Dhaka, Bangladesh
- Occupations: Singer; songwriter
- Years active: 1940–2014
- Spouse: Kamal Dasgupta (m. 1956; died 1974)
- Children: 3, including Hamin Ahmed and Shafin Ahmed
- Relatives: Mohammad Asafuddowla (brother); Anis Ud Dowla (brother)
- Awards: Independence Day Award (1979)

Firoza Begum (Bengali: ফিরোজা বেগম; 28 July 1930 – 9 September 2014) was a Bangladeshi Bengali Nazrul Geeti singer. She was awarded the Independence Day Award in 1979 by the government of Bangladesh.

== Early life and career ==
Firoza Begum was born in Gopalganj District on 28 July 1930 to the zamindar family of Ratail Ghonaparha. Her parents were Khan Bahadur Mohammad Ismail of Faridpur, and Begum Kowkabunnesa. She became drawn to music in her childhood. She started her career in 1940s.

Firoza Begum first sang in All India Radio while studying in sixth grade. She met the national poet Kazi Nazrul Islam at the age of 10. She became a student of his. In 1942, she recorded her first Islamic song by the gramophone record company His Master's Voice in 78 rpm disk format. Since then, 12 LP, 4 EP, 6 CD and more than 20 audio cassette records have been released. She lived in Kolkata from 1954 until she moved to Dhaka in 1967.

== Personal life ==
On 28 March 1956, Feroza Begum married Kamal Dasgupta (who converted to Islam before the marriage and took the name Kamal Uddin Ahmed), a singer, composer, and lyricist. Kamal died on 20 July 1974. Two of their three sons, Hamin Ahmed and late Shafin Ahmed are musicians. They were members of the rock band Miles.

== Death ==
Firoza Begum died on 9 September 2014 in Apollo Hospital, Dhaka due to heart and kidney problems.

== Awards and honours ==
=== Awards ===
- Independence Day Award (1979)
- Netaji Subhash Chandra Award
- Satyajit Ray Award
- Nasiruddin Gold Medal
- Bangladesh Shilpakala Academy Gold Medal
- Best Nazrul Sangeet Singer Award
- Nazrul Academy Award
- Churulia Gold Medal
- Gold Disk from CBS, Japan
- Meril-Prothom Alo Lifetime honorary award (2011)
- Sheltech Award (2000)

=== Honours ===
- D Lit from University of Burdwan
- Bongo Shomman from Mamata Banerjee (2012)

== Legacy ==
The 'Feroza Begum Memorial Gold Medal' was introduced from 2016 by Dhaka University. The recipient is selected by a jury board each year from nationally recognised music artists.

On 28 July 2018, Google celebrated Firoza Begum's 88th Birthday with a Google Doodle.
