= Moner Ghore Boshot Kore =

Bangladeshi film

- Theatrical release poster
- Directed by: Jakir Hossain Raju
- Screenplay by: Jakir Hossain Raju
- Produced by: Md Khorshed Alam Khosru; Mohammad Iqbal
- Starring: Shakib Khan; Apu Biswas; Chanchala Chanchu; Kazi Hayat; Misha Sawdagor; Rehana Jolly; Kazi Hayat
- Music by: Ali Akram Shuvo
- Distributed by: Binemoi Kothachitro
- Release date: 14 October 2011
- Country: Bangladesh
- Language: Bengali

Moner Ghore Boshot Kore (Bengali: মনের ঘরে বসত করে) is a Bengali-language film directed and written by Jakir Hossain Raju, who directed the 2010 blockbuster film Bhalobaslei Ghor Bandha Jay Na. The film stars Shakib Khan, Apu Biswas, Chanchala Chanchu (in her film debut), Misha Sawdagor, Rehana Jolly, Kazi Hayat, and Ilias Kobra, and was declared a hit at the Box Office.

== Cast ==
- Shakib Khan
- Apu Biswas
- Chanchala Chonchu
- Misha Sawdagor
- Don
- Rehana Jolly
- Kazi Hayat
- Elias Kobra
- Asif Iqbal
- S.I. Tutul - Guest Appearance
- Kaniz Suborna - Guest Appearance

== Music ==
Moner Ghore Boshot Kore was scored by Ali Akram Shuvo.

Track List
No.	Title	Artist(s)	Length
1.	"Amar Moner E Ghore"	Andrew Kishore, Kanak Chapa
2.	"Ami To Naam Jani Na"
3.	"Disco Disco"	S.I. Tutul, Kaniz Shuborna, DJ
4.	"Ektai Chawa Tomay Pawa"	Kanak Chapa, S.I. Tutul
5.	"Ki Kotha Koy Hridoy"	Kanak Chapa, Andrew Kishore

== Production ==
The film was shot in Bangladesh and Thailand

== Critical reception ==
Daud Hossain Rony of The Daily Kaler Kantho of Bangladesh gave the film 2.5 out of 5 stars.
