= Agra Road (film) =

1957 Bollywood film directed by Ravindra Dave

- Directed by: Ravindra Dave
- Written by: Umesh Mathur
- Screenplay by: Om Dogra
- Story by: Om Dogra
- Produced by: Ravindra Dave
- Starring: Shakila; Vijay Anand; Bhagwan Dada
- Cinematography: M. W. Mukadam
- Edited by: Dharamvir
- Music by: Roshan
- Production company: Nagina Films
- Distributed by: Nagina Films
- Release date: 1957
- Country: India
- Language: Hindi

Agra Road is a 1957 Bollywood film directed by Ravindra Dave starring Vijay Anand, Shakila, Satish Vyas, Nanda and Dhumal.

== Cast ==
- Vijay Anand as Sunil
- Shakila as Sarita
- Nanda as Seema
- Satish Vyas as Bholu
- Dhumal as Ramu
- Bhagwan Dada as CID Inspector Khanna

== Music ==
Lyrics written by Bharat Vyas and Prem Dhawan

Song	Singer
"Unse Rippi Tippi Ho Gayi, Apni Baat Pakki Ho Gayi"	Geeta Dutt, Mohammed Rafi
"Duniya Ki Nazar Hai Buri, Zulfen Na Sawara Karo"	Geeta Dutt, Mohammed Rafi
"Gajab Hua Ram, Sitam Hua Ram, Hum Dil Kho Baithi"	Geeta Dutt, Mohammed Rafi
"Gunahon Ka Chirag Kabhi Jal Na Sakega, Paapiyon Ka Paap Kabhi Phal Na Sakega"	Geeta Dutt, Mohammed Rafi, Shamshad Begum
"O Mister, O Mister, Suno Ek Baat"	Geeta Dutt, Manna Dey
"Yeh Duniya Hai Babu Bada Beimaan"	Geeta Dutt
"Suno Sunaye Aaj Tumhe Ek Chhoti Si Kahani" (Part 1)	Asha Bhosle
"Suno Sunaye Aaj Tumhe Ek Chhoti Si Kahani" (Part 2)	Asha Bhosle
