= Nek Parvin =

1946 film

Nek Pervin
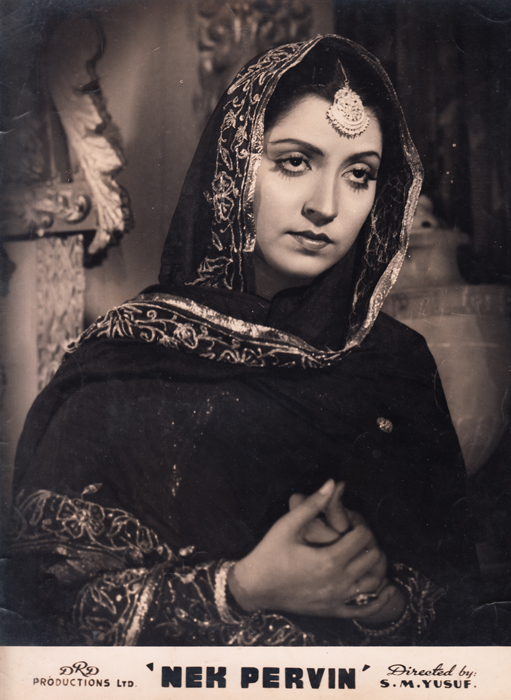
- A photo lobby card
- Directed by: S. M. Yusuf
- Screenplay by: Wahid Qureshi
- Story by: Wahid Qureshi
- Starring: Ragni; Ulhas; Yakub
- Release date: 14 June 1946
- Country: India
- Language: Hindustani

Nek Pervin is a 1946 Indian-Hindustani-language film directed by S. M. Yusuf.

The film stars Ragni in the titular role of Pervin, who faces all of her marital hardships given by her husband with patience. Ulhas and Yakub played the pivotal roles. The music was composed by Feroz Nizami.

The film was remade in 1975 with the same title starring Muhammad Ali, Nisho and Aslam Pervaiz.

== Plot ==
The film revolves around a simple girl Pervin who teaches in a school and is rewarded at the end due to her patience. She leaves the school job when her aunt has her marry Afzal, knowing that he is a gambler. She thinks that after marriage, he will turn into a good person, but it did not happen and he even becomes an alcoholic as well and loses all of his property in gambling. On night, in drunken state, he goes to Shaukat (the person who wanted to marry Pervin in the past and has also won the Afzal's house in gambling) who has already murdered Muneer but couldn't find a way to handle the corpse. When Afzal reaches there, Shaukat calls the police and tells them that Afzal has murdered Muneer. However, Afzal somehow succeeds to escape and goes away, leaving the city with the help of Pervin. He catches the train from Lahore to Calcutta where he enters the room of a rich old businessman. He saves him from the attack of a thief and pushes him from train (who was wearing clothes which he had stolen from her) which distorts his face. The businessman offers him to handle all of his business for the favour of saving his life. He reaches Calcutta, works hard there with honesty, becomes a rich person after years and decides to visit hir wife and daughter in Lahore. He changes his looks, as there he is wanted by the police due to an accusation of murder.

On the other hand, in Lahore, police mistakenly thinks the thief as Afzal and issues the statement that Afzal who is the murderer of Muneer, has been killed in train accident. Pervin with her daughter works hard to meet both ends. Shaukat teases her as she has no money to pay rent for the house. She moves to a small house with her daughter. When he arrives, Afzal learns that Shaukat has trapped Pervin fraudulently. He tries to assault her but one of his companion (who is involved with him in every of his sin) restrains him. He then shoots him. He tells about his crimes to his other companion not knowing that Afzal has come there along with the police. Hearing about his crimes, the police arrest him and Afzal reveals his true identity. There, he reunites with Pervin and his daughter.

== Cast ==
The cast of the film includes:

- Ragni
- Ulhas
- Yakub
- Kumar
- Yashodhra Katju
- Mirza Musharaff
- W. H. Khan

== Reception ==
In a 1946 review in Filmindia, the film was criticized due to its poor direction, bad acting, forced dialogues. The journal reviewed that the story development lacks consistency and imagination.
