= Ravindra Dave =

Indian film director, producer, editor and screenwriter (1919–1992)

- Born: 16 April 1919; Karachi, British India
- Died: 21 July 1992 (aged 73); Mumbai, India
- Occupations: Film director, producer, editor, screenwriter
- Spouse: Jashumatiben

Ravindra Dave (16 April 1919 – 21 July 1992) was an Indian film director, producer, editor and screenwriter. He directed more than 30 Hindi films in the 1950s and 1960s including several hits like Nagina (1951), Agra Road (1957), Post Box 999 (1958), Satta Bazaar (1959), Dulha Dulhan (1964) and Raaz (1967). He turned to Gujarati cinema with his blockbuster Jesal Toral (1971) and directed more than 25 Gujarati films in the 1970s and 1980s.

== Early life ==
Ravindra Dave was born on 16 April 1919 in Karachi, British India (modern day Pakistan) in a Brahmin family. His family belonged to Halvad (modern day Gujarat, India). At the age of 14, he joined his uncle Dalsukh M. Pancholi in Lahore as a production manager for his Punjabi films. He learned editing from producer and director Shaukat Hussain Rizvi.

== Career ==
=== Hindi cinema ===
Dave directed two songs for Shiri-Farhad in 1942, which was left incomplete by director Prahalad Dutt. His direction of songs impressed his uncle Dalsukh Pancholi who entrusted him with the job. In 1943, he co-directed Poonji with Vishnu R. Pancholi. The film revolves around three sisters trying to prevent their father from remarrying. His next noir film, Dhamki, was a suspense thriller.

After the partition of India, he left Lahore and moved to Bombay (now Mumbai), India. He directed social dramas, comedies, mythological as well as patriotic films. He directed several murder mysteries and suspense thrillers. Sawan Bhado was his first film after moving to Bombay.

In 1951, he directed Nagina starring Nutan and Nasir Khan. The film introduced playback singer C. H. Atma and the music was composed by Shankar Jaikishan. Following its success, Dave named his production company Nagina Films. He produced Satta Bazaar, starring Balraj Sahni and Meena Kumari, and Dulha Dulhan, starring Raj Kapoor and Sadhana under the banner of Nagina Films. Naina starred Geeta Bali and Abhi Bhattacharya.

His films Moti Mahal and Char Minar were thrillers. Actor Vijay Anand debuted with his film Agra Road. Post Box 999, starring Sunil Dutt and Shakila, was inspired by the Hollywood film Call Northside 777. Raaz starred Rajesh Khanna and Babita. His last Hindi film was Road to Sikkim starring Anju Mahendru and Dev Kumar.

He worked with some of the leading composers of the time, including: Ghulam Haider, Husnlal Bhagatram, Vijaysinghraje Patwardhan, Shankar Jaikishan, C. Ramchandra, Chitragupta, O. P. Nayyar, Manna Dey, S. D. Burman, Roshan, Kalyanji-Anandji and Ravi.

=== Gujarati cinema ===
Dave had planned to remake his blockbuster Nagina with Leena Chandavarkar and Sanjay Khan, but the project was delayed. As a result, he turned his production crew to Gujarati cinema to keep them employed. He directed Jesal Toral based on the local legend of Gujarat launching the careers of Upendra Trivedi and Ramesh Mehta. The film proved to be one of the biggest hits of Gujarati cinema and ran for 25 weeks in theatres. It won 17 awards from the Government of Gujarat. The film is considered to have revived the Gujarati cinema.

His other blockbuster Gujarati films include: Raja Bharathari, Hothal Padmani, Kunwarbai nu Mameru, Shetal Ne Kanthe, Malavpati Munj, Bhadar Tara Vehta Pani, Son Kansari, and Patali Parmar. His last Gujarati film was Malo Nagde starring Upendra Trivedi, Aruna Irani and Mulraj Rajda.

He directed 26 Gujarati films in total. Upendra Trivedi starred in 16 of them and he collaborated with music composer Avinash Vyas on 20 of them.

== Last years ==
In the 1980s, he undertook a crime thriller titled Mera Pati Mera Qatil with the hope of returning to Hindi films, but the film never went into production due to his ill health and financial constraints. Years later, Rakesh Roshan produced Khoon Bhari Maang with a similar plot which was declared a hit.

Ravindra Dave died on 21 July 1992 in Mumbai.

== Legacy ==
Film historian Subhash Chheda said, "Dave brought the diminishing Gujarati culture in front of the people. The films were mostly produced for an urban audience then. He made films for a rural audience which were also well received by the urban audience. His biggest contribution [to Gujarati cinema] is bringing a new audience to Gujarati films."

Due to his expertise in thriller and mystery films, Chheda called him India's Alfred Hitchcock.

== Personal life ==
Dave was married to Jashumatiben. He enjoyed driving and owned several vintage cars. He was an amateur painter, carpenter, and sculptor. Dave was fondly known as Ravinbhai in the Hindi film industry and Bapa in the Gujarati film industry.

== Filmography ==
He directed, produced or wrote the following films:

=== Director ===
==== Hindi films ====
- Poonji (1943) (co-directed)
- Dhamki (1945)
- Patjhad (1948)
- Chunaria (1948)
- Naach (1949)
- Sawan Bhado (1949)
- Lachhi (1949)
- Chakori (1949) (only producer)
- Meena Bazaar (1950) (also screenwriter)
- Sharad Punam (1950) (only producer)
- Nagina (1951)
- Moti Mahal (1952)
- Lal Kunwar (1952)
- Naina (1953)
- Bhai Saheb (1954)
- Shikar (1955)
- Lutera (1955)
- Lagan (1955)
- Char Minar (1956)
- Agra Road (1957) (also producer)
- Post Box 999 (1958) (also producer)
- Farishta (1958)
- Satta Bazaar (1959) (also producer)
- Guest House (1959)
- Ghar Ghar Ki Baat (1959)
- C.I.D. Girl (1959)
- Girls Hostel (1962)
- Ankh Micholi (1962)
- Band Master (1963)
- Tere Dwar Khada Bhagwan (1964)
- Punar Milan (1964) (only producer)
- Dulha Dulhan (1964) (also producer)
- Raaz (1967)
- Road to Sikkim (1969)
- Sajan (1969) (only screenwriter)

==== Gujarati films ====
- Jesal Toral (1971)
- Raja Bharathari (1973)
- Hothal Padmani (1974)
- Kunwarbai nu Mameru (1974)
- Shetalne Kanthe (1975)
- Sant Surdas (1975)
- Bhaibandhi (1976)
- Malavpati Munj (1976)
- Bhadar Tara Vaheta Pani (1976)
- Son Kansari (1977)
- Paiso Bole Chhe (1977)
- Jay Randalma (1977)
- Chundadi Odhi Tara Namni (1978)
- Patali Parmar (1978)
- Bhagya Laxmi (1978)
- Preet Khandani Dhar (1979)
- Suraj Chandrani Sakhe (1979)
- Virangana Nathibai (1980)
- Koino Ladakvayo (1980)
- Dukhada Khame E Dikri (1981)
- Sheth Jagdusha (1981)
- Jagya Tyarthi Sawar (1981) (also producer)
- Palavade Bandhi Preet (1983) (also producer)
- Naagmati Naagwallo (1984)
- Malo Nagde (1985) (also producer)
