= Mohammad Asafuddowla =

Bangladeshi lyricist

Mohammad Asafuddowlah
- মোহাম্মদ আসাফউদ্দোলা
- Born: 1936 (age 89–90); Faridpur, Bengal Presidency, British India
- Occupations: Musician, orator, administrator
- Spouse: Zulfia Asaf
- Relatives: Firoza Begum (sister); Anis Ud Dowla (brother)

Mohammad Asafuddowlah is a Bangladeshi lyricist, composer, orator and a former chairman of the Water Development Board of the Government of Bangladesh. Secretary of many different ministries of Bangladesh. He served as the founding editor of the English daily The Bangladesh Today. He was awarded the Ekushey Padak in 1993 by the Government of Bangladesh for his contribution to music.

== Early life ==
Asafuddowla was born in 1936 in Gopalganj District, East Bengal, British India. father was Khan Bahadur Mohammad Ismail of a Zamindari family and his mother was Begum Kawkabunnesa. His siblings were Nazrul Geeti singer Firoza Begum, M. Anis Ud Dowla, M. Mosiuddowla, Marium Begum, Shamsunnahar Begum and Rizia Begum. He studied at the Faridpur Zilla School. He studied English literature at the University of Dhaka where he was the vice-president of the Fazlul Huq Muslim Hall.

== Career ==
Asafuddowla joined the Bangladesh Civil Service. He was a joint secretary in 1974. He rebuffed Swaran Singh, Minister of External Affairs of India, when he questioned visiting Pakistan for the Second Islamic Conference of the Organisation of Islamic Cooperation.

Asafuddowla was the secreter of the Ministry of Water Resources in 1992. There was speculation that he would be made a minister after his retirement. As Secretary of the Ministry of Commerce, he led a delegation of Bangladesh to Myanmar.

Asafuddowla served as the Chairman of Sonali Bank. He was the President of the Bangladesh Administrative Service Association. In 2012, he filed a petition challenging the legality of keeping civil service officers as officers on special duty following which the High Court made illegal to keep an officer on OSD for more than 150 days.

In 2017, Bangladesh Nationalist Party suggested Asafuddowla for the post of commissioner of the Bangladesh Election Commission.

Asafuddowla was the editor of The Bangladesh Today. He was the chairperson of Bangladesh Society for the Enforcement of Human Right. At a milad-mehfil by Syed Muhammad Ibrahim in January 2021, he along with Asif Nazrul, Fakhrul Azam, Hafizuddin Ahmed, Mahmudur Rahman Manna, Mia Golam Parwar, and Zafrullah Chowdhury called for the overthrow of Prime Minister Sheikh Hasina.

== Personal life ==
Asafuddowla was married to Zulfia Asaf (née Ahmad), daughter of Late Professor Dr. Nafis Ahmad who was Director, Human Resources, at the Pan Pacific Hotel.

== Works ==
Albums

- Sur-e Sur-e Dekha Hobey (lyrics and composition; 2011)
