= Anis Ud Dowla =

Bangladeshi businessman (born 1937)

- Born: 1 March 1937 (age 89); Faridpur, Bengal Presidency, British India
- Education: University of Dhaka; University of Karachi
- Occupation: Businessperson
- Known for: Chairman of ACI Limited
- Spouse: Najma Dowla (d. 2021)
- Children: 2
- Relatives: Firoza Begum (sister); Mohammad Asafuddowla (brother)

Anis Ud Dowla (born 1 March 1937) is a Bangladeshi businessman. He is the chairman of ACI Group, one of the largest conglomerates in Bangladesh. He was awarded Business Person of the Year at the Bangladesh Business Awards 2017.

== Background and education ==
Dowla was born on 1 March 1937 in Faridpur in the then Bengal Presidency in British India. His father was Khan Bahadur Mohammad Ismail. His siblings are Nazrul Geeti singer Firoza Begum, musician Mohammad Asafuddowla, M. Mosiuddowla, Marium Begum, Shamsunnahar Begum and Rizia Begum.

Dowla completed his bachelor's degree in physics from the University of Dhaka. With a scholarship from The Asia Foundation, he went to University of Karachi to complete his master's degree in public administration.

== Career ==
After graduation, Dowla started his career at UK based British Oxygen Group as Assistant Sales Manager in Chittagong. For the next 27 years, he served the divisions in Pakistan, Bangladesh and Kenya. He become the first Bangladeshi managing director of Oxygen Group. In 1987, he became the managing director of the three Imperial Chemical Industries (ICI) companies in Bangladesh. In 1992, ICI divested its shareholding and Dowla took the leadership of the company and changed the name of ICI to Advanced Chemical Industries (ACI).

In 1977, Dowla served as the president of Narayanganj Chamber of Commerce and Industries. He was elected as the president of Metropolitan Chamber of Commerce & Industries for three terms, Bangladesh Employers' Association for four terms and Bangladesh Employers' Federation for two terms.

Dowla is the chairman of Pioneer Insurance Company Limited and the director of Credit Rating Agency of Bangladesh.

== Personal life ==
Dowla was married to Najma Dowla (d. 2021). Together they had a daughter, Shusmita Anis, and a son, Arif Dowla. Arif is currently the managing director of ACI Limited.
