= Dalsukh M. Pancholi =

Indian film producer and director (1906–1959)

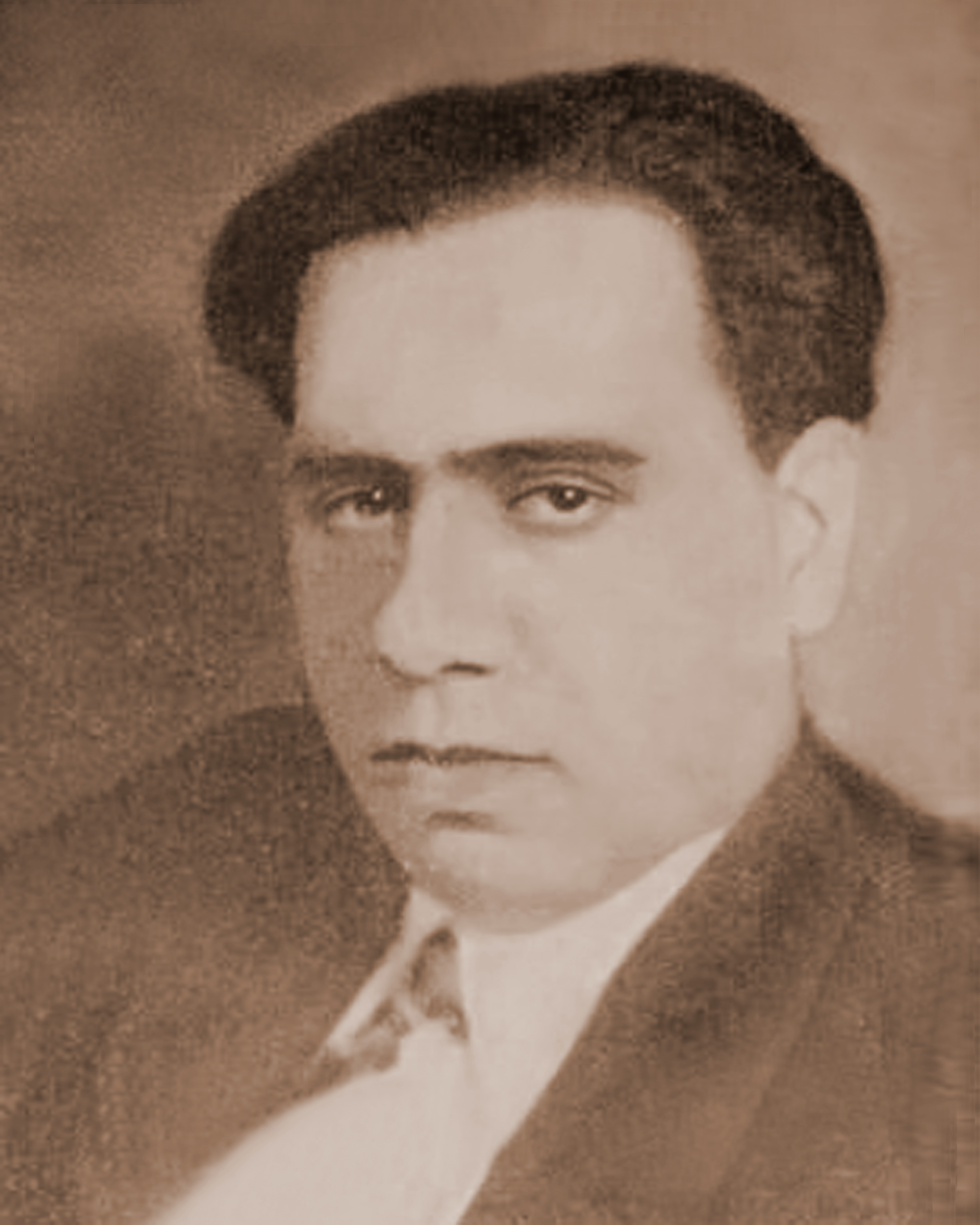
- Pancholi in IMPPA President early 1954s
- Born: 1906; Karachi, British India, Roots Halvad,Gujarat, India.
- Died: 20 October 1959 (age 53); Bombay, India
- Occupations: Producer, Distributor, Exhibitor
- Known for: Gul Bakawali, Yamla Jatt, Chaudhary
- Relatives: Reva Shankar PancholI elder Brother, Vishnu Pancholi, Rajan Pancholi, Damodar Pancholi, Aditya Pancholi (Nephew -Rajan's Son)

Dalsukh M. Pancholi (1906–1959) was an Indian film-maker, producer, and distributor who is remembered for making the first Punjabi film. Considered to be a film pioneer, Pancholi's Empire Talkie Distributors based in Lahore were the biggest importer of American films in northern and western India. Pancholi's Pancholi Art Pics was also the largest film studio in Lahore at the time of the Partition of India He was also Indian Motion Pictures Producers' Association (IMPPA) president in 1954-55 in Mumbai.

== Personal life ==
He hailed from the village Halvad in Saurashtra, Gujarat. His nephew Ravindra Dave was also a film director and producer.

Among Lahore's filmmakers, Dalsukh Pancholi introduced Noor Jehan as a child star in Gul Bakawali. He was forced to move to Bombay in 1947 due to the partition, leaving his studio to continue for another two years. His elder brother R.M. Pancholi started the movie business. The last film it produced was somewhat ironically titled Ghalat Fehmi.

His brother Rajan Pancholi is the father of famous film actor Aditya Pancholi.

== Filmography ==
- Sohni Mahiwal (1939)
- Gul-E-Bakawali (1939)
- Yamla Jatt (1940)
- Chaudhary (1941)
- Khazanchi (1941)
- Zamindar (1942)
- Khandan (1942)
- Poonji (1943) - Producer
- Daasi (1944)
- Shirin Farhad (1945)
- Dhamki (1945)
- Kaise Kahoon (1945)
- Patjhad
- Meena Baazar (1950)
- Nagina (1951)
- Aasman (1955)
- Lutera (1958)
- Farishta (1958)
