= Toofan Aur Deeya =

- Poster
- Directed by: Prabhat Kumar
- Written by: G. D. Madgulkar
- Story by: G. D. Madgulkar
- Starring: Satish Vyas; Nanda; Rajendra Kumar; Vatsala Deshmukh; Shanta Kumari; Krishna Kumar; Keshavrao Date; Ulhas
- Cinematography: G. Balkrishna
- Edited by: Chintamani Borkar
- Music by: Vasant Desai; Bharat Vyas; Hasrat Jaipuri
- Production company: Rajkamal Kalamandir
- Release date: 1956
- Country: India
- Language: Hindi

Toofan Aur Deeya (English: Storm and Lamp) is a 1956 Hindi-language drama film directed by Prabhat Kumar and produced by V. Shantaram under the banner of Rajkamal Kalamandir. It stars Satish Vyas, Nanda, Rajendra Kumar, and Keshavrao Date, with music composed by Vasant Desai and lyrics by Bharat Vyas. Set in the post-independence period, the film follows a boy and his sister as they navigate life after the death of their father.

== Plot ==
The film is set in a period shortly after Indian independence and follows the lives of Sadanand and his elder sister Nandini, who face financial difficulties after the death of their father, the poet Milind Madhav. Following his death in poverty and without recognition, the two siblings attempt to support themselves and their ailing mother.

Sadanand, though still a schoolboy, takes up small jobs such as selling vegetables, distributing newspapers, and carrying luggage at the railway station to support the family. Nandini contributes by cooking meals for a small group of local patrons. Among them is Satish Sharma, referred to as "Masterji," a college student who shares a quiet mutual affection with Nandini.

Masterji is awarded a gold medal for an essay on the works of Milind Madhav. He visits Chachiji, the widow of the poet, and shows her the medal, which bears an image of her late husband. Soon after, Masterji returns to his village to help his indebted father and declines Chachiji's request that he marry Nandini, explaining that he has responsibilities toward his younger sisters.

After the death of their mother, Sadanand and Nandini leave their home to escape painful memories. They sell their remaining possessions and move to a temple, with the permission of a reclusive holy man. From there, Sadanand continues to work by selling vegetables in town. One day, he meets Alkaji, a dancer he had helped earlier at the railway station. She expresses a fondness for him, as he reminds her of her own son, whom she has sent away to be raised elsewhere. When she explains that her profession does not allow her to live with him, Sadanand is disturbed and stops visiting her.

Over time, Nandini begins to lose her eyesight. Sadanand blames himself for not seeking treatment earlier and contemplates taking his own life. He is stopped by the holy man, who encourages him to seek help instead. Alkaji, who has since decided to change her lifestyle and reunite with her son, offers financial assistance for Nandini's operation. The surgery is successful, and her eyesight is restored.

Shortly after, Sadanand learns that Masterji is seriously ill with typhoid in a nearby town. He travels there and works to raise money for his treatment. Masterji recovers, and he and Nandini are eventually married at the temple.

After their departure, Sadanand expresses his sense of loneliness. The holy man assures him that he will no longer live in isolation and offers to support Sadanand's education, believing he has the potential to contribute meaningfully to society. The film ends with Sadanand embracing the holy man as a new chapter begins.

== Cast ==
- Satish Vyas as Sadanand
- Nanda as Nandini
- Keshavrao Date as Sanyasi baba
- Rajendra Kumar as Satish Sharma
- Vatsala Deshmukh as Dancer
- Ulhas as eye doctor

== Songs ==
1. "Ye Kahani Hai" (aka Nirbal se ladaayee) - Manna Dey
2. "Muraliya Baje Ri" - Lata Mangeshkar
3. "Aankhon Mein Aankhen" - Shamshad Begum
4. "Piya The Kahan Gayo" - Lata
5. "Giridhari Mhane" - Lata
6. "Aaya Re Bhajiwala" - Geeta Dutt
7. "Dil Tumne Liya" - Shamshad
8. "Meri Choti Si Bahen" - Geeta, Lata
9. "Meri Aan" - Geeta

The song "Ye Kahani Hai" is set in raga Malkauns. The song "Piya The Kahan Gayo" is set in raga Asavari.

== Trivia ==
A torn poster of the movie 'Dr. Kotnis ki Amar kahani' is seen on the wall in the song 'Aaya re bhajiwala', the film also produced by Rajkamal Kalamandir of V. Shantaram.
