= Hum Panchhi Ek Daal Ke =

Hum Panchhi Ek Dal Ke
- Poster
- Directed by: P. L. Santoshi
- Written by: P. L. Santoshi
- Story by: R. K. Narayan; Rao
- Produced by: Sadashiv J. Row Kavi
- Starring: Romi; Satish Vyas; Mohan Choti; Daisy Irani; Jagdeep
- Narrated by: Manmohan Krishna
- Cinematography: S. Maruti Rao
- Edited by: J. S. Diwadkar
- Music by: N. Datta
- Production company: AVM Productions
- Release date: August 8, 1957
- Country: India
- Language: Hindi

Hum Panchhi Ek Dal Ke (transl. We are birds on a single branch) is a 1957 Indian Hindi-language film starring Romi, Satish Vyas, Mohan Choti, Daisy Irani and Jagdeep in lead roles. It won the National Film Award for Best Children's Film.

== Plot ==
Rajendranath Mehra, affectionately called "Rajan", by his parents and friends, is the only son of Rai Bahadur Kailashnath Mehra. He studies in a nearby school with Nandlal "Nandu", Mehmood, Chatpat, Guru and others. Once, Nandlal plans for an educational tour with his classmates. Rajan wants to go with them, which is not permitted by his angry father, because he doesn't like the friendship between his rich son and his poor classmates, but his mother helps him to go.

The next morning, when his father is informed of this, he is enraged. At first, he sends his servant Damu, to bring Rajan home, which he fails. Then his father sends his friend Mirza Usman for the same. When he also fails, his father decides to go fetch his son himself. When his father goes in search, he is informed that children are back to their own homes. After returning home, Rajan's father forbids Rajan to go to school further. In lieu of school, he places an ad for a private tutor for Rajan. A tutor is selected by his father, who is an ex-ringmaster.

Rajan, with the help of his friend Chatpat, manages to go outside and meet with his friends as well as take part in a school drama. After a month, on the salary date of the tutor, Rajan's father discovers that his son has not taken any classes and it is his friend, who has given proxy for his son. Again enraged, he begins search for his son, which leads him to his friend Nandlal's house. He learns that Nandlal was injured, so his son is selling newspapers for their income. Then, he realises his mistake. He then decides for more facilities and entertainment for Rajan and his friends. At last, he accepts the friendship between Rajan and his friends.

== Cast ==
- Romi as Rajendranath Mehra "Rajan"
- Satish Vyas as Nandlal "Nandu"
- Jagdeep as Mehmood
- Daisy Irani as Chatpat
- Mohan Choti as Guru
- B. M. Vyas as Rehman
- Marutirao Parab as Damu
- Murad as Rai Bahadur Kailashnath Mehra
- Achala Sachdev as Prema Mehra
- David as Mirza Usman

== Production ==
Hum Panchhi Ek Dal Ke was directed by P. L. Santoshi, and produced by Sadashiv J. Row Kavi under AVM Productions. It was shot in Madras.

== Soundtrack ==
The soundtrack was composed by N. Datta and lyrics written by P. L. Santoshi.

Song	Singer
"Hum Panchhi Ek Dal Ke"	Mohammed Rafi
"Hum Panchhi Ek Dal Ke"	Asha Bhosle
"Ek Se Do Bhale"	Asha Bhosle
"Pooja Ke Do Phool"	Asha Bhosle
"Lo Chhip Gaya Chand"	Asha Bhosle
"Suno Suno Re Kahani Ek Bahut Purani, Jise Kehti Thi Nani, Ho Ek Bahut Purani Suno Suno Re Kahani"	Asha Bhosle, Suman Kalyanpur, Usha Mangeshkar, Shamshad Begum
"Sab Hain Bharatwasi, Bolo Bhai Sab Hain Bharatwasi"	Asha Bhosle, Suman Kalyanpur

== Accolades ==
At the 5th National Film Awards, Hum Panchhi Ek Dal Ke won the National Film Award for Best Children's Film.
