= Shahjehan =

1946 film

- Directed by: A. R. Kardar
- Written by: A. R. Kardar
- Screenplay by: A. R. Kardar
- Story by: Kamal Amrohi
- Produced by: A. R. Kardar
- Starring: K. L. Saigal; Ragni; Kanwar; Nasreen; P. Jairaj
- Cinematography: Dwarkadas Divecha
- Edited by: Moosa Mansoor
- Music by: Naushad
- Production company: Kardar Productions
- Distributed by: Kardar Productions
- Release date: 1946
- Country: India
- Language: Hindi

Shahjehan is a 1946 Indian Hindi language film. The film was directed by Abdul Rashid Kardar and written by Kamal Amrohi.

It starred K. L. Saigal, Ragini, Kanwar, Nasreen and P. Jairaj. The music was composed by Naushad with Majrooh Sultanpuri making his debut as a film song lyricist. Khumar Barabankvi was the other lyricist in this film.

The story is a fictionalized account of an episode during the reign of Emperor Shah Jahan, with the fiction also linking it to the building of the Taj Mahal.

It was the second highest grossing Indian film of 1946.

== Cast ==
- K. L. Saigal as Suhail
- P. Jairaj as Shirazi
- Ragni as Ruhi
- Kanwar as Shah Jahan
- Nasreen as Mumtaz
- Mohammed Afzal Rizvi as Jwala Singh
- Sulochana Chatterjee as Janfiza
- Rehman as Ghulam

== Soundtrack ==
The music of the film was composed by Naushad.

No.	Title	Lyrics	Singer(s)	Length
1.	"Jab Dil Hi Toot Gaya" (Raga Bhairavi)	Majrooh Sultanpuri	K. L. Saigal
2.	"Ghum Diye Mustakil"	Majrooh Sultanpuri	K. L. Saigal
3.	"Jab Usne Gesu Bikhrayen"	Majrooh Sultanpuri	Shamshad Begum
4.	"Mere Sapnon Ki Rani"	Majrooh Sutlanpuri	K. L. Saigal, Mohammed Rafi
5.	"Chaah Barbaad Karegi" (Raga Bageshri)	Khumar Barabankvi	K. L. Saigal
6.	"Ae Dil-E-Beqarar" (Raga Bihag)	Khumar Barabankvi	K. L. Saigal
7.	"Aag Lagi Dil Mein Woh"	Majrooh Sultanpuri	Naseem Akhtar
8.	"Jawani Ke Daaman Ko"	Majrooh Sutlanpuri	Shamshad Begum
9.	"Kar Lijiye Chal Kar Meri"	Majrooh Sultanpuri	K. L. Saigal
