= Poonji =

- Directed by: Ravindra Dave; Vishnu R. Pancholi
- Produced by: Dalsukh M. Pancholi
- Starring: M. Esmail, Durga Mota, Ragini
- Music by: Master Ghulam Haider
- Release date: 1943
- Country: India
- Language: Hindi

Poonji is a Bollywood film. It was released in 1943. The film was directed by Ravindra Dave and Vishnu R. Pancholi. It starred M. Esmail, Durga Mota, Ragini in lead roles.

== Plot ==
The film revolves around three sisters trying to prevent their father from remarrying.

== Production ==
The film was a debut of directors Ravindra Dave and Vishnu R. Pancholi. The film was produced by Dalsukh M. Pancholi. The film starred M. Esmail, Durga Mota, Ragini in lead roles. The music was directed by Ghulam Haider.

== Reception ==
The film was released in 1943 and declared commercially hit.

The Film India (December 1943) magazine noted, "A film that entertained and yet made a substantial contribution to the screen art of the country... The picture is directed by two new comers and considering that they were new to the game, they could be said to have done very well."
