= Shafin Ahmed =

Bangladeshi bassist and singer-songwriter (1961–2024)

- শাফিন আহমেদ
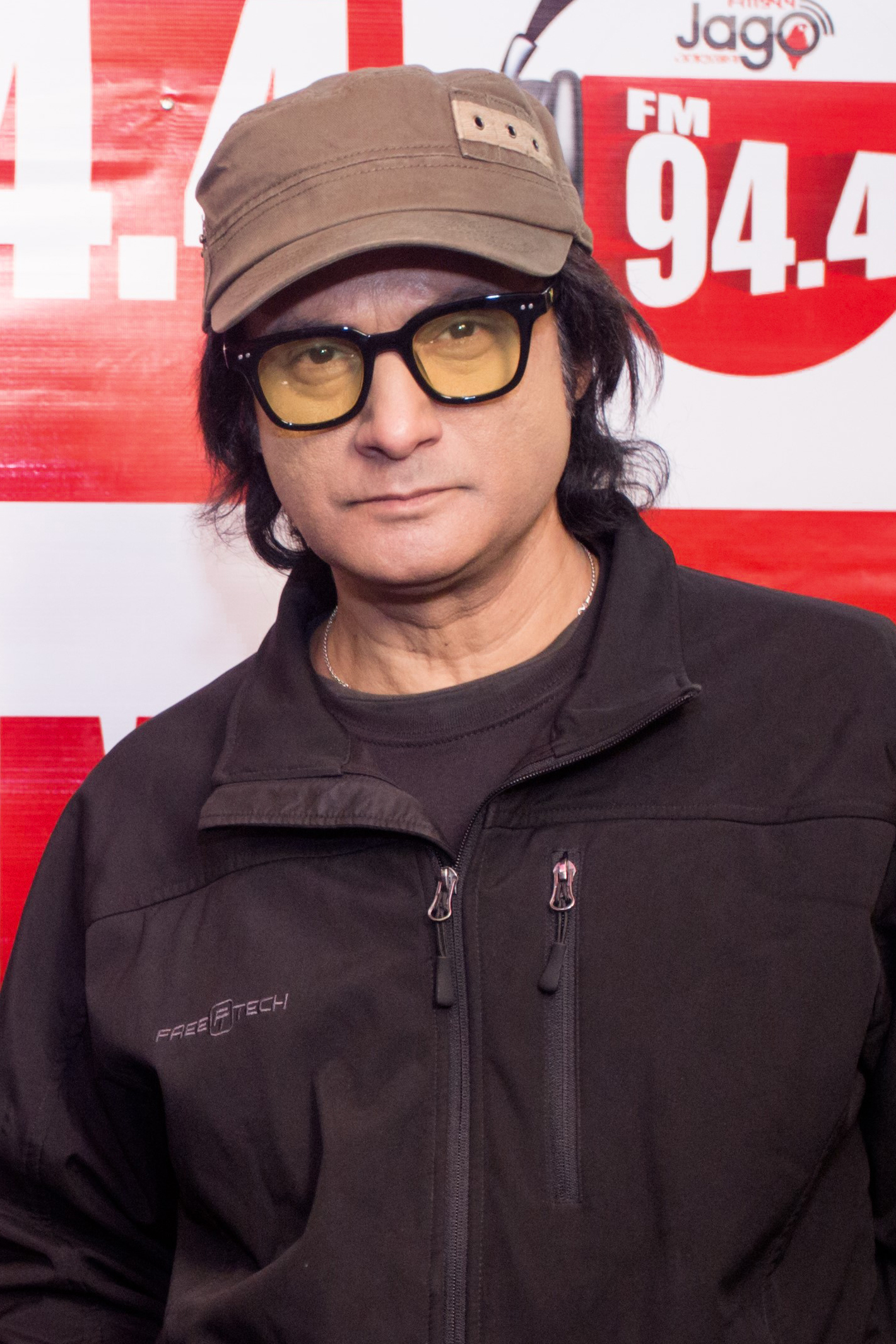
- Ahmed in 2019
- Born: Shafin Ahmed Muna; 14 February 1961; Kolkata, West Bengal, India
- Died: 24 July 2024 (aged 63); Woodbridge, Virginia, United States
- Education: St. Joseph College
- Occupations: Singer-songwriter; record producer; politician
- Parents: Kamal Dasgupta (father); Firoza Begum (mother)
- Relatives: Hamin Ahmed (brother)
- Musical career
- Origin: Dhaka, Bangladesh
- Genres: Pop rock; blues rock; jazz fusion
- Instruments: Bass; vocals; keyboards
- Years active: 1979–2024
- Labels: Sargam; Soundtek; ME; Sangeeta; Laser Vision
- Formerly of: Rhythm of Life; Miles

Shafin Ahmed (14 February 1961 – 24 July 2024) was a Bangladeshi rock bassist, singer-songwriter, record producer and politician. He was the lead singer, songwriter and bassist for the Bangladeshi rock band Miles, where he and his elder brother Hamin Ahmed joined in 1979 and led the band.

Born in the city of Kolkata, Shafin was the youngest son of Bangladeshi classical music singer Kamal Dasgupta and Bangladeshi singer Firoza Begum. Their family was traditionally a musical family. He started his musical career at the age of 9. They moved to Dhaka in the late 1960s. He was exposed to rock and roll music in the late 1970s, when he went to London for higher education. He joined Miles in 1979, first as an acoustic guitarist, and later lead singer and bassist in 1991 when many of the past members had left and Miles reestablished themselves in the 1990s Bangla rock music scene.

== Early life ==
Shafin was born in Calcutta on 14 February 1961. He was the youngest son of famous musicians Kamal Dasgupta and Feroza Begum. They later moved to Dhaka. He began his musical career at the age of 9 by taking lessons about Nazrul Sangeet. He was exposed to Western musical influences since he studied in England, along with his elder brother, Hamin Ahmed. They then joined the band Miles which went on to become a leading musical group in Bangladesh.

== Career ==
=== Miles (1979–2021) ===
Shafin joined the pioneering rock band Miles in 1979 as acoustic guitarist along with his brother Hamin and later became the lead singer and bassist. He appeared on all of the albums of Miles and wrote and composed many of their top hits. In 2009, he left Miles over problems with the other members about the ownership of Miles. But, in 2013 he returned to the band and appeared on the ninth album প্রতিচ্ছবি (Reflections). He left Miles again in 2017 after having trouble with the members again but came back in late 2018 after resolving their issues. He announced in 2021 that he would be leaving the band for the third and final time.

=== Rhythm of Life (2010–2010) ===
On 12 January 2010, Ahmed left Miles citing personal differences with the band. He formed a new band group – Rhythm of Life. The other members who joined were – Wasiun (guitar), Shahin (guitar), Sumon (keyboard), Shams (bass guitar), Ujjal (percussion), and Rumi (drums). But Shafin disbanded the new group and returned to Miles at the end of the year.

== Death ==
Ahmed died in Woodbridge, Virginia, United States while undergoing treatment for heart and kidney failure, on 24 July 2024. He was 63.

== Discography ==
=== Band ===
==== Miles ====
- A Step Further (1986)
- প্রতিশ্রুতি (Promise) (1991)
- প্রত্যাশা (Expectation) (1993)
- প্রত্যয় (Belief) (1996)
- প্রয়াস (Attempt) (1997)
- "প্রবাহ (Flow)" (2000)
- "প্রতিধ্বনি (Echoes)" (2006)
- "প্রতিচ্ছবি (Reflections)" (2015)
- "প্রবর্তন (Induction)" (2016)

=== Solo ===
- তোমাকেই (Only You) (1997)
- পাগলা ঘন্টি (Mad Bell) (1998)
- ছবি আর স্মৃতি (Images and the Memories) (1999)
- Best of Shafin Ahmed (2001)
- কতদিন দেখিনা তোমায় (Didn't See You For Many Days) (2006)
- Virus (2006)
- হারানো সুখ (Lost Happiness) (2007)
- My Love Songs (2010)
