= Bimal Das Gupta =

Indian Painter

Bimal Das Gupta (1917–1995), was an Indian artist. He was educated in the Government College of Arts and Craft at Kolkata. He later joined the faculty of the College of Art, Delhi.

== Biography ==
Bimal Das Gupta (1917–1995) was an influential Indian artist known for pioneering modern abstraction in the country. He was born in West Bengal in 1917 and raised by his uncle. He later enrolled in the Government College of Arts and Crafts in Kolkata in 1937, where he began his formal training in the visual arts¹². During the Second World War, Gupta briefly worked as a clerk, which paused his artistic pursuits. However, his dedication to art ultimately prevailed. He returned to creative work, joining Victory magazine as an assistant art director, where he oversaw visual design projects.

After graduating in 1943, Gupta gained experience working at an art gallery before accepting a teaching position at the College of Art in Delhi. His fourteen-year tenure there not only solidified his reputation as an artist but also allowed him to mentor and influence a generation of emerging Indian artists. Throughout his career, he explored a range of styles including landscape painting, cubism, and neo-tantrism, gradually evolving toward a more abstract mode of expression that set him apart from his contemporaries.

In the 1940s, Gupta was experimenting with modern abstractionism in New Delhi—long before many other artists or collectives began to embrace this approach³. His work is noted for its vivid use of earth tones and inventive color combinations, which he applied to evoke the energy and essence of natural phenomena. Gupta’s abstract compositions often explored themes as diverse as the underwater world, the cosmos, and elements of Tantra philosophy, rendered in media such as acrylics, watercolors, and mixed media.

Gupta’s innovative approach led to his work being widely exhibited both in India and internationally, earning him recognition not only for his artistic genius but also for his generosity toward fellow and emerging artists. His contributions laid the groundwork for a distinctly Indian form of abstraction that diverged from the European modernist trends prevalent at the time.

His death in a car accident in 1995 brought an end to his career.

== Awards ==
- 1988 - Awarded title of "Kala Ratana" by AIFACS
- 1972 - State Honour, Sahitya Kala Parishad, New Delhi.
- 1961-62 - Govt. Scholarship to travel around Europe.
- 1958 - Certificate, National Exhibition of Art, Lalit Kala Akademi, New Delhi.
- 1956 - Din & Jukerman’s Prize, AIFACS, New Delhi.
- 1956 - National Award, Lalit Kala Akademi, New Delhi.
- 1954 - Gold Medal, Academy of Fine Arts, Calcutta.
- 1954 - First Prize, Hyderabad Art Exhibition, Hyderabad.
- 1989 -Made fellow of the Lalit Kala Academi, New Delhi

Bimal Das Gupta had an adversity towards awards and post 1972 refused many coveted and prestigious awards.

== Media coverage and external links ==
- Bimal Dasgupta: Bringing back the master of water colours; The Indian Express August 11, 2014
- Lasting impressions The Hindu; August 14, 2014
- Lasting Landscapes The New Indian Express; July 23, 2014
- Lokmattimes September 16, 2024
- The artistic journey of Bimal Dasgupta: Transitioning into pure abstraction Financial Express September 20, 2024
- Celebrating the Visionary Legacy of artist Bimal Das Gupta Good Homes Sep 20, 2024
- Celebrating the Legacy of Bimal Das Gupta, a Visionary Who Redefined Indian Abstraction in Modern Art First India 16 Sep-2024
- Celebrating the Legacy of Bimal Das Gupta Ahmedabad Mirror
