= Satish Vyas (actor) =

Indian actor (born 20th century

- Born: 20th century
- Occupation: Actor
- Notable work: Toofan Aur Deeya (1956); Hum Panchhi Ek Daal Ke (1957)

Satish Vyas (born 20th century) is a former Indian actor in Hindi- and Gujarati-language films.

== Career ==
He was known as a child actor after his performance in V. Shantaram's drama film Toofan Aur Deeya (1956), where the actress Nanda made her debut as a leading lady. This was followed by the children's drama film Hum Panchhi Ek Daal Ke (1957), which won the Prime Minister's Gold Medal for the Best Children's Film.

He was seen as a lead actor in the 1968 Gujarati-language film Maadi Mane Kahewa De.

== Filmography ==
Year	Film	Character/Role
1975	Jogidas Khuman	
1968	Maadi Maane Kaheve De	
1964	Tere Dwaar Khada Bhagwan	
1961	Char Diwari	
1961	Matlabi Duniya	
1960	Mendi Rang Lagyo	
1959	Do Ustad	
1957	Agra Road	Bholu
1957	Hum Panchhi Ek Dal Ke	Nandlal "Nandu"
1957	Janam Janam Ke Phere: Alias Sati Anapurna	Young Raghu
1956	Toofan Aur Deeya	Sadanand
