= Hamin Ahmed =

Bangladeshi musician and singer (born 1959)

Hamin Ahmed হামিন আহমেদ
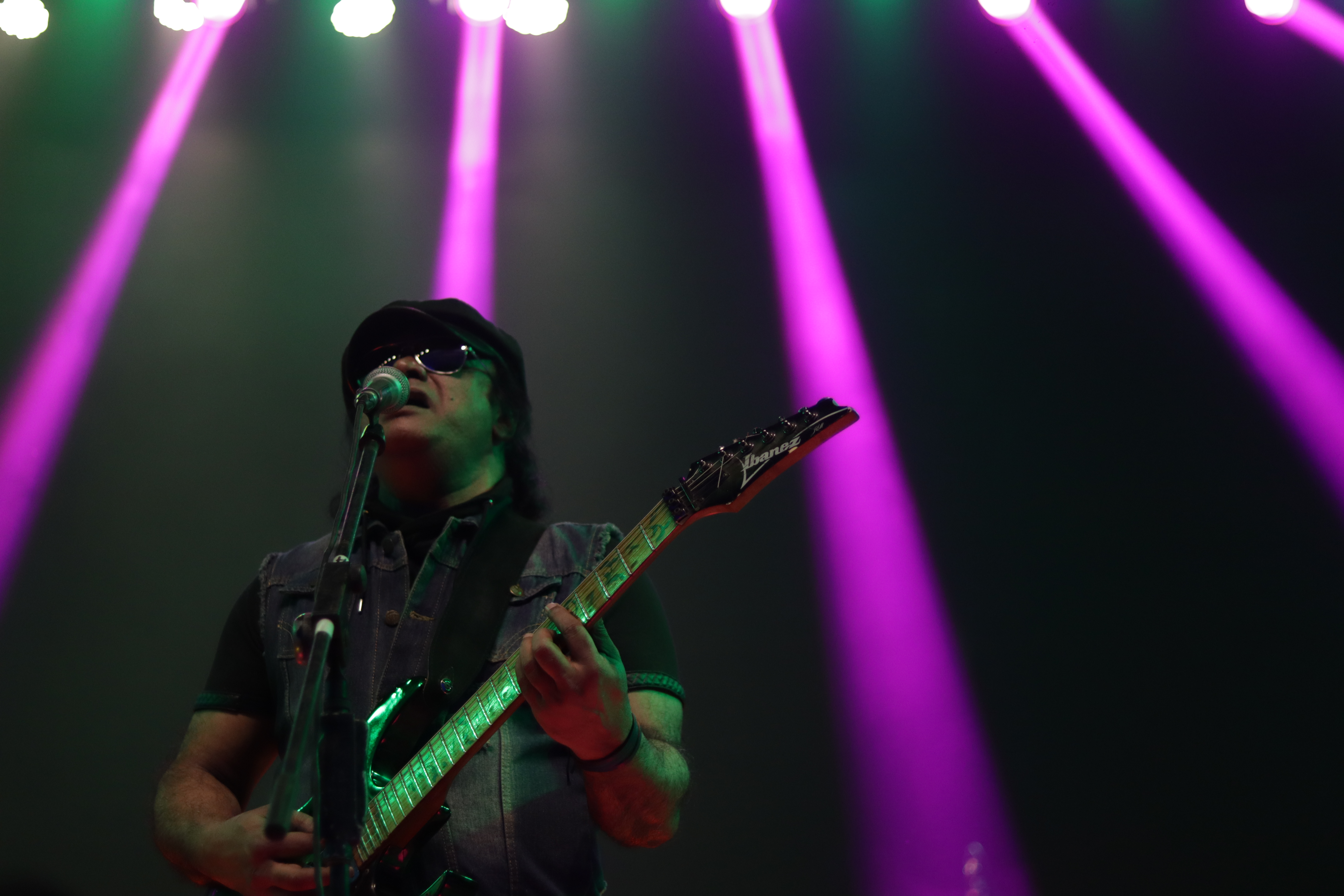
- Ahmed in 2024

Background information
- Born: 8 March 1959 (age 67); Calcutta, West Bengal, India
- Origin: Dhaka, Bangladesh
- Genre: Pop rock
- Occupations: Musician, composer, guitarist, bassist and singer
- Instruments: Vocals, guitar
- Years active: 1979–present
- Member of: Miles
- Spouse: Kaniz Suborna (m. 2008)

Hamin Ahmed (born 8 March 1959) is a Bangladeshi musician and former Bangladesh national cricket player. He is a member of the rock band Miles. Hamin Ahmed is currently the President of BAMBA (Bangladesh Musical Bands’ Association) as well the CEO of BLCPS, the first CMO in Bangladesh.

== Personal life ==
Ahmed is the son of Kamal Dasgupta, a music director and Firoza Begum, a Nazrul Sangeet singer. Ahmed first studied in a school in Calcutta, then at Notre Dame College in Dhaka. Ahmed is married to Kaniz Suborna since 22 April 2008 and has three children. His younger brother Shafin Ahmed was a fellow member of Miles.

== Career ==
In early days, Ahmed played cricket with the clubs – National Sporting, Surja Tarun, Azad Boys, Abahani, Mohammedan. He was part of Bangladesh's squad for the ICC Trophy of 1986.

He commenced his musical journey as the vocalist and guitarist with the renowned Miles band in 1979.

Ahmed started his own computer business venture, DataTech in 1987. Later, he joined ACI in 1992. Besides, he has his own businesses to run.

== Discography ==
=== Band ===
- Miles (মাইল্‌স) (1982)
- A Step Farther (আরও এক ধাপ) (1986)
- "প্রতিশ্রুতি(Promise)" (1991)
- "প্রত্যাশা (Expectation)" (1993)
- "প্রত্যয় (Belief)" (1996)
- "প্রয়াস (Attempt). (1997)
- "প্রবাহ (Flow)" (2000)
- "প্রতিধ্বনি (Echoes)" (2006)
- "প্রতিচ্ছবি (Reflections)" (2015)

Extended Play

- "প্রবর্তন (Induction)" (2016)
