= Manmani =

- Directed by: Sarvottam Badami
- Produced by: Ajit Pictures
- Starring: P. Jairaj; Sabita Devi; E. Billimoria; Ragini; Nazir Hussain
- Music by: Kamal Dasgupta
- Production company: Ajit Pictures
- Release date: 1947
- Country: India
- Language: Hindi

Manmani (Happy-Go-Lucky) is a 1947 Hindi social film directed by Sarvottam Badami and produced by Ajit Pictures. It had music composed by Kamal Dasgupta. This was the last film of actress Ragini in pre-partition India before she shifted to Pakistan. The film starred P. Jairaj, Ragini, Sabita Devi, E. Billimoria, Nazir Hussain, Maruti, Amar and Shrinath.

The story revolves around the grooming of a young village girl by a wealthy city man due to a bet.

== Plot ==
Manohar, a wealthy young man and Shashi, a young city girl are good friends. They argue about who is a bigger spendthrift, man or woman. Manohar decides to prove that it's the female and for that he finds a young village girl Tara, who he decides to use as an experiment. Tara resides in the village with her father, but agrees to go to the city With Manohar to get photographed. In the city she lives with Manohar and he starts grooming her into a perfect lady. She learns the ways and then decides to go to see her father in the village. Manohar has fallen in love with Tara but is unable to tell Shashi, who also loves him. When the villagers taunt Tara for staying alone with a young man in the city, she lets them know that she and Manohar are getting married. She returns to the city with her father, only to find Manohar showing slides of the different stages of development in Tara's grooming to a group of people. Misunderstandings arise only to be sorted out finally when Manohar explains.

== Cast ==
- P. Jairaj
- Ragini
- Sabita Devi
- E. Billimoria
- Nazir Hussain
- Maruti
- Amar
- Shrinath

== Music ==
The music composer was Kamal Dasgupta and the songs were sung by Kalyani Das, Hemant Kumar and Santosh Sengupta

=== Songlist ===
#	Title	Singer
1	Dheere Dheere Aa Tu Is Nadi Me	Hemant Kumar, Kalyani Das
2	Beiman Tori Batiya Jadu Bhari	Hemant Kumar, Kalyani Das
3	Ishare Ishare Me Duniya Bana Li	Hemant Kumar
4	O Tara Ko Chand Banane Wale	Kalyani Das
5	O Ghar Ko Chhodne Wale Bata	Kalyani Das
6	Sautan Ghar Naa Jaiyo Re	Kalyani Das
7	Hans Hans Ke Jiye Ja	Kalyani Das
8	Ae Chaman Bata Kyu Hansta Hai	Kalyani Das
9	Akeli Mat Jaiyyo Radhe Jamuna Ke Teer	Santosh Sengupta
