= Miles (band) =

Bangladeshi rock band

Miles মাইল্‌স

Background information
- Origin: Dhaka, Bangladesh
- Genres: Pop rock; Blues rock
- Years active: 1979–present
- Label: Miles Music
- Members: Hamin Ahmed; Manam Ahmed; Syed Ziaur Rahman Turjo; Iqbal Asif Jewel
- Past members: Shafin Ahmed; Farid Rashid; Kamal Mainuddin; Happy Akhand; Larry Burnaby; Musa Rahman; Ishtiaq Admed; Robin; Shahedul Huda; Milton Akbar; Mahbubur Rashid; Khayem Ahmed

Miles is a Bangladeshi rock band formed in Dhaka on 1 August 1979.

They released their self titled debut studio album, Miles, in 1982, which contained English numbers. They released their second album, A Step Farther, in 1986. After four years, they released their third studio and first Bengali album Protisruti (Promise) in 1991.

== History ==
Their first album, Miles, was produced in 1982 including five original songs and seven cover songs. Their second album, A Step Farther was released in 1986 and it consisted of 7 original and 5 cover songs. Their first Bengali album, Protisruti, was released in 1991. It included 12 original Bengali songs. Their second Bengali album, Prottasha, was released in 1993.

The fourth Bengali album, Probaho, was produced in 1999.

In 2011, Grameenphone announced that it would release their album Proticchobi. The album was released in 2015.

== Concerts ==
From 1979 to 1982, Miles played at the Chambeeli Super Club at the Hotel Intercontinental in Dhaka five nights a week. They went on to perform on Bangladesh Television. In 1982, Miles made their first appearance in public concert at Shilpakala Academy Auditorium in Dhaka.

In 1991, they performed their first concert outside Bangladesh, in Bangalore. In 1992, Miles performed in the very first BAMBA concert. They signed a lucrative sponsor deal with Pepsi in 1995 where exclusive concerts were held in Bangladesh. In 1996 and 1998 they went back to India to perform in Kolkata. In 1996 they did a major tour in the United States and Canada over two months. They performed in New York City, Dallas, Oklahoma City, Chicago, Miami and Montreal.

In 1999, they performed in a large concert at Chittagong stadium with over 30,000 attending. Miles toured Australia and Italy in 2008.

In 2010, Miles performed mainly in stadium concerts across the country, in cities including Rangpur, Comilla, Mymensingh, Khulna, Rajshahi, Chittagong and Dhaka.

In 2012, Miles started their 30-year anniversary tour by performing in cities of America including Atlanta, Houston, Los Angeles, New York, San Jose and Seattle.

In 2019, Miles 40th Anniversary was celebrated by touring and performing in USA's Jersey City, Alexandria, Baltimore, Los Angeles, New York, Atlantic City, Phoenix, San Jose, Tampa, Buffalo, Detroit, Columbus, West Lafayette, Dallas and Canada's Vancouver, Calgary, Winnipeg, Edmonton, Ottawa, Montreal, Toronto and also Australia's Sydney, Brisbane, Melbourne as well as Bangladesh's Chittagong and a grand concert in Dhaka.

== Members ==
Present members

- Hamin Ahmed – vocals, lead guitars (1979–present)
- Manam Ahmed – keyboards (1982–present)
- Syed Ziaur Rahman Turjo – drums (1997–present)
- Iqbal Asif Jewel – lead guitars (1999–present)

Past members

- Shafin Ahmed – vocals, bass guitars (1979–2009, 2014–2017, 2018–2021)
- Farid Rashid – vocals, bass guitars (1979–1986)
- Kamal Mainuddin – drums (1979–1986)
- Happy Akhand – keyboards, vocals (1979–1984)
- Larry Burnaby – lead guitars (1979–1984)
- Ishtiaq – rhythm guitars (1979–1982)
- Shahedul Huda – drums (1979–1981)
- Musa – lead guitars (1982–1984)
- Robin – keyboards (1986–1987)
- Milton Akbar – drums (1987–1992)
- Mahbubur Rashid – drums (1992–1996)
- Khayem Ahmed – bass guitars (2009–2014)
- Faysal Ahmed Tanim – bass guitars (2018)

== Discography ==
- Miles (1982)
- A Step Farther (1986)
- Protishruti (1991)
- Prottasha(1993)
- Prottoy (1996)
- Proyash (1997)
- Probaho (2000)
- Protiddhoni (2006)
- Protichobi (2015)
- Proborton (2016)
