= List of Bangladeshi films of 1972 =

A list of Bangladesh films released in 1972.

== Releases ==
Title	Director	Cast	Genre	Notes	Release date	Ref(s)
Manusher Mon	Mostafa Mehmoud	Razzak, Bobita, Anwar Hossain, Rosy, Anwara		First released film after the independence of Bangladesh.		
Somadhan	Azizur Rahman	Shabana, Uzzal, Anwar Hossain, Rosy, Subhash Dutt				
Joy Bangla	Fakhrul Alam					
Komolranir Dighi	Ibn Mizan	Razzak, Koborie				
Bahram Badshah	M A Kashem	Kashem, Kobita				
Polasher Rong	Akbar Kabir Pintu					
Erao Manush	Nayaran Ghosh Mita					
Bijlee	Mustafiz					
Ora Egaro Jon	Chashi Nazrul Islam	Razzak, Khasru, Shabana, Nuton, Khalil, Hasan Imam, ATM Shamsuzzaman	War, History, Drama	based on Bangladesh Liberation War, Produced by Md Masud Parvez	11 August	
Lalon Fakir	Syed Hasan Imam					
Nimai Sanyashi						
Ranga Bou	Sirajul Islam Bhuiyan					
Chhondo Hariye Gelo	S M Shafi	Razzak, Shabana, Wasim, Olivia, Anwar Hossain, Supreea	Romance			
Kach er Sworgo	Abul Bashar					
Protishodh	Babul Chowdhury	Razzak, Suchanda				
Osru Diye Lekha	Kamal Ahmed	Razzak, Sujata, Anwar Hossain, Suchanda				
Nijeke Haraye Khuji	Ruhul Amin					
Shapoth Nilam	Hashmot					
Panchi Bawra	RupoKar					
Arunodoyer Agnishakkhi	Subhash Dutta	Anwar Hossain, Bobita, Uzzal, Subhash Dutta, Khokon	War, History, Drama	based on Bangladesh Liberation War.	8 November	
Abujh Mon	Kazi Jahir	Razzak, Shabana, Shawkat Akbar, Sujata Azim, ATM Shamsuzzaman	Romance, Drama		8 November	
Jibon Songi	H. Akbar					
Roktakto Bangla	Momotaz Ali	Biswajit, Kabori Sarwar, Mustafa, Sultana Zaman, Jainal, Khalil	War, History, Drama	based on Bangladesh Liberation War.	15 December	
Bagha Bangali	Ananda	Kobita, Ananda	War, History, Drama	based on Bangladesh Liberation War.	15 December	
Shikriti	Azizur Rahman					
Diaries of Bangladesh	Alamgir Kabir		Documentary	based on Bangladesh Liberation War.		
Deshe Agamon	Bangladesh film and publication board		Documentary	based on Bangladesh Liberation War.		
Dashi	E R Khan					
Gaan Geye Porichoy	Anwar Ashraf	Razzak, Kabori Sarwar	Romance			

== See also ==
- 1972 in Bangladesh
- List of Bangladeshi films of 1973
- List of Bangladeshi films
- Dhallywood
- Cinema of Bangladesh
