= 1977 in Bangladesh =

- Centuries: 20th; 21st
- Decades: 1950s; 1960s; 1970s; 1980s; 1990s
- See also: Other events of 1977; List of years in Bangladesh

1977 (MCMLXXVII) was a common year starting on Saturday of the Gregorian calendar, the 1977th year of the Common Era (CE) and Anno Domini (AD) designations, the 977th year of the 2nd millennium, the 77th year of the 20th century, and the 8th year of the 1970s decade.

The year 1977 was the 6th year after the independence of Bangladesh. It was also the first year of the Government of Ziaur Rahman. In this year while Zia had to deal with mutinies and coup attempts, Zia managed to consolidate his power through a referendum, and promoted a nineteen-point political and economic program focusing on population control, food security, education and rural development.

== Incumbents ==
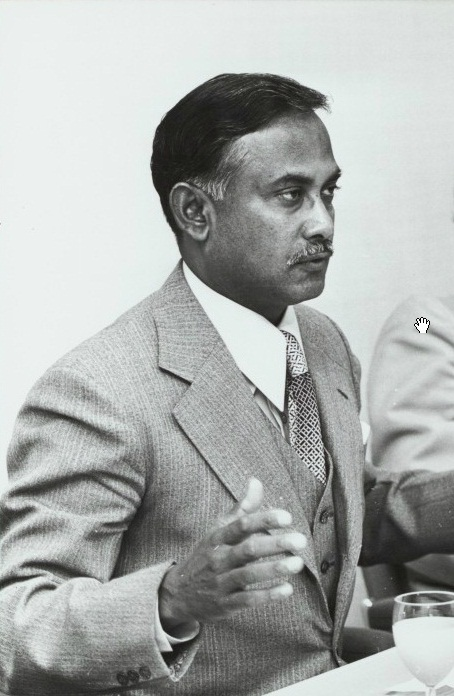
Ziaur
Rahman

- President: Abu Sadat Mohammad Sayem (until 21 April), Ziaur Rahman (starting 21 April)
- Vice President: Abdus Sattar (starting June)
- Chief Justice: Syed A. B. Mahmud Hossain

== Demography ==
Demographic Indicators for Bangladesh in 1977
Population, total	73,463,593
Population density (per km^{2})	564.4
Population growth (annual %)	2.5%
Male to Female Ratio (every 100 Female)	106.3
Urban population (% of total)	11.6%
Birth rate, crude (per 1,000 people)	44.4
Death rate, crude (per 1,000 people)	16.3
Mortality rate, under 5 (per 1,000 live births)	211
Life expectancy at birth, total (years)	50.5
Fertility rate, total (births per woman)	6.7

== Climate ==
Climate data for Bangladesh in 1977
Month	Jan	Feb	Mar	Apr	May	Jun	Jul	Aug	Sep	Oct	Nov	Dec	Year
Daily mean °C (°F)	18.1 (64.6)	20.4 (68.7)	26.4 (79.5)	26.3 (79.3)	26.3 (79.3)	27.2 (81.0)	28. (82)	28.2 (82.8)	28.2 (82.8)	26.1 (79.0)	23.8 (74.8)	19.3 (66.7)	24.9 (76.8)
Average precipitation mm (inches)	4.1 (0.16)	32. (1.3)	42. (1.7)	299.3 (11.78)	328.1 (12.92)	527.8 (20.78)	493. (19.4)	293.2 (11.54)	178.1 (7.01)	159.6 (6.28)	34. (1.3)	25. (1.0)	2,416.1 (95.12)
Source: Climatic Research Unit (CRU) of University of East Anglia (UEA)

== Economy ==
Key Economic Indicators for Bangladesh in 1977
National Income
	Current US$	Current BDT	% of GDP
GDP	$9.7 billion	BDT149.3 billion	
GDP growth (annual %)	2.7%		
GDP per capita	$131.4	BDT2,032	
Agriculture, value added	$4.7 billion	BDT73.0 billion	48.9%
Industry, value added	$1.6 billion	BDT25.0 billion	16.7%
Services, etc., value added	$3.3 billion	BDT51.3 billion	34.4%
Balance of Payment
	Current US$	Current BDT	% of GDP
Current account balance	-$281.0 million		-2.9%
Imports of goods and services	$1,203.9 million	BDT18.5 billion	12.4%
Exports of goods and services	$540.6 million	BDT10.5 billion	7.0%
Foreign direct investment, net inflows	$7.0 million		0.1%
Personal remittances, received	$78.9 million		0.8%
Total reserves (includes gold) at year end	$241.5 million		
Total reserves in months of imports	2.3		

Note: For the year 1977, the average official exchange rate for BDT was 15.38 per US$.

== Events ==
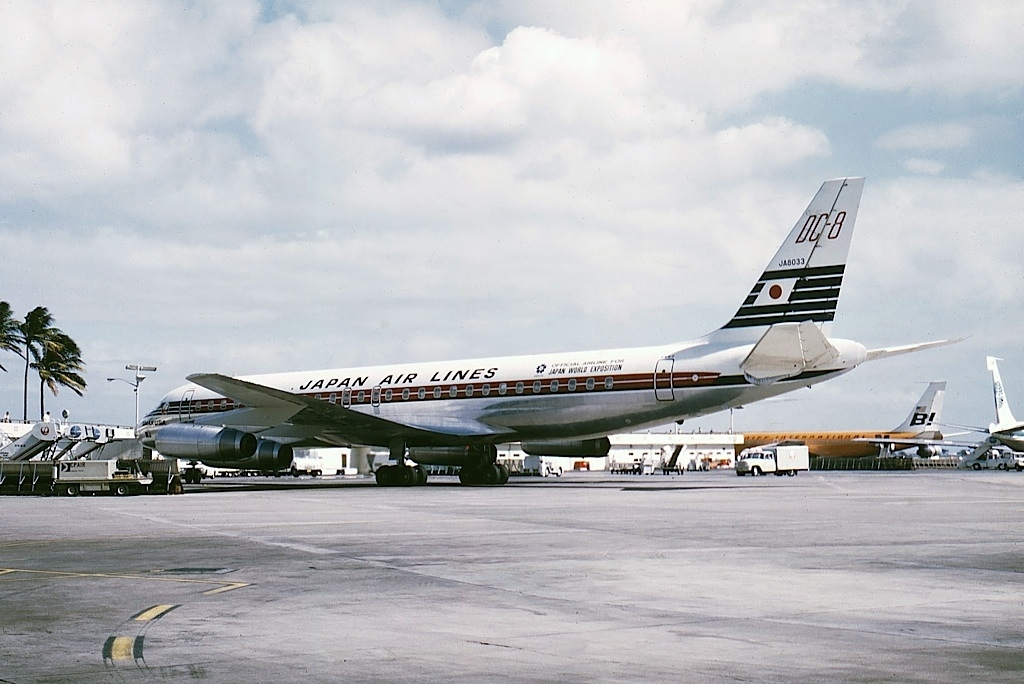
JA8033, the aircraft involved in the hijacking in 1977

- 21 April: Zia replaces Sayem as the President of Bangladesh
- 30 May: Zia wins 98.9 percent of votes in referendum on his continuance as president
- 3 June: Supreme Court Justice Abdus Sattar becomes vice president
- 28 September: A Japan Airlines Flight 472 en route from Mumbai to Tokyo was hijacked by 5 Japanese Red Army terrorists shortly after takeoff, and forced the plane to land at then Zia International Airport. The terrorists' demand of $6 million and release of 6 JRA terrorists from Japanese prison was met by the Japanese Prime Minister. Bangladesh Air Force was deployed to control the situation in the ground and to facilitate negotiations
- 30 September: A mutiny breaks out in Bogra
- 2 October: The mutiners are defeated by government forces, but is followed by another failed attempt to overthrow Zia in Dhaka
- A five-year treaty is signed with India on water sharing
- Bangladesh became an Associate member of the International Cricket Council
- Government of Bangladesh launches Operation Dabanal in the Chittagong Hill Tracts

=== Awards and Recognitions ===
==== Independence Day Award ====
Recipients	Area	Note
Maulana Abdul Hamid Khan Bhashani	Social work	Posthumous
Kazi Nazrul Islam	Literature	The national poet of Bangladesh
Mokarram Hussain Khundker	Science and Technology	Posthumous
Zainul Abedin	Arts	Posthumous
Mahbub Alam Chashi	Rural development	
Brig. Mahmudur Rahman Choudhury	Medical science	
Dr. Md. Zafrullah Chowdhury	Population control	
Runa Laila	Music	
Habildar Mostak Ahmad	Sports	
Enayet Karim	Welfare	First Ambassador from Bangladesh to USA

==== Ekushey Padak ====
1. Mohammad Nasiruddin (literature)
2. Ustad Gul Mohammad Khan (music)
3. Ibrahim Khan (education)
4. Mahmuda Khatun Siddiqua (literature)
5. Khondakar Abdul Hamid (journalism)
6. Ayub Ali (education)
7. Shamsur Rahman (literature)
8. Zahir Raihan (drama)
9. Rashid Choudhury (fine arts)
10. Abdul Alim (music)
11. Altaf Mahmud (music)
12. Ferdausi Rahman (music)
13. Farrukh Ahmad (literature)

=== Sports ===
- Domestic football: Abahani KC won 1977 Dhaka First Division League title, while Rahmatganj MFS came out runners-up.

== Births ==
- GMB Akash, photographer
- Mohammad Rakibul Hasan, photographer
- Amin Khan, actor
- Zulfiker Mahmud Mintu, footballer
- Zulfiqer Russell, lyricist

== Deaths ==
- 13 February: Abdus Salam, editor. (b. 1910)
- 22 February: Sultan Ahmed, politician. (b. 1912)
- 2 May: Mahmuda Khatun Siddiqua, writer. (b. 1906)
- 2 September: Theotonius Amal Ganguly, Archbishop. (b. 1920)
- 24 October: Hatem Ali Khan, politician. (b. 1904)
- 3 November: Muhammad Qudrat-i-Khuda, scientist. (b. 1900)
- 11 November: ARM Inamul Haque, social worker. (b. 1921)

== See also ==
- 1970s in Bangladesh
- List of Bangladeshi films of 1977
