= 1975 in Bangladesh =

- Centuries: 20th; 21st
- Decades: 1950s; 1960s; 1970s; 1980s; 1990s
- See also: Other events of 1975; List of years in Bangladesh

1975 (MCMLXXV) was a common year starting on Wednesday of the Gregorian calendar, the 1975th year of the Common Era (CE) and Anno Domini (AD) designations, the 975th year of the 2nd millennium, the 75th year of the 20th century, and the 6th year of the 1970s decade.

The year 1975 was the 4th year after the independence of Bangladesh. It was also the last year of the first post-independence government in Bangladesh and a year marked with a coups and coup d'état.

== Incumbents ==
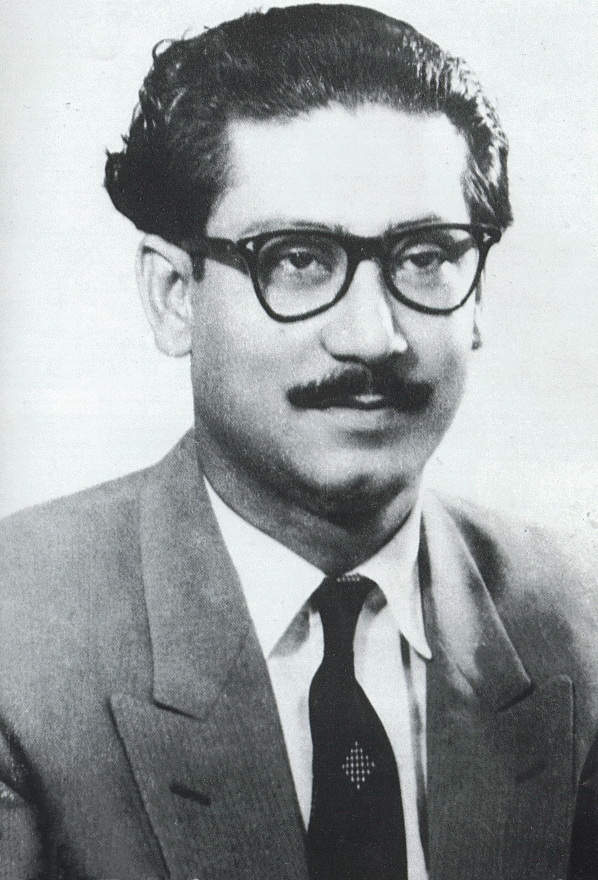
Mujibur Rahman

- President:
  - until 25 January: Mohammad Mohammadullah
  - 25 January-15 August: Sheikh Mujibur Rahman
  - starting 6 November: Abu Sadat Mohammad Sayem
- Prime Minister:
  - until 25 January: Sheikh Mujibur Rahman
  - 25 January-15 August: Muhammad Mansur Ali
  - starting 15 August: Post abolished
- Chief Justice: Abu Sadat Mohammad Sayem (until November 5), Syed A. B. Mahmud Hossain (starting November 18)

== Demography ==
Demographic Indicators for Bangladesh in 1975
Population, total	70,066,310
Population density (per km^{2})	538.3
Population growth (annual %)	1.9%
Male to Female Ratio (every 100 Female)	106.5
Urban population (% of total)	9.8%
Birth rate, crude (per 1,000 people)	45.3
Death rate, crude (per 1,000 people)	18.0
Mortality rate, under 5 (per 1,000 live births)	217
Life expectancy at birth, total (years)	48.3
Fertility rate, total (births per woman)	6.8

== Climate ==
Climate data for Bangladesh in 1975
Month	Jan	Feb	Mar	Apr	May	Jun	Jul	Aug	Sep	Oct	Nov	Dec	Year
Daily mean °C (°F)	18.1 (64.6)	20.8 (69.4)	25.5 (77.9)	28.2 (82.8)	28.1 (82.6)	28.4 (83.1)	27.1 (80.8)	28. (82)	27.5 (81.5)	27.4 (81.3)	22.5 (72.5)	18.3 (64.9)	25. (77)
Average precipitation mm (inches)	2.7 (0.11)	10.7 (0.42)	19.5 (0.77)	130.2 (5.13)	263.7 (10.38)	379.4 (14.94)	673. (26.5)	306.4 (12.06)	371.4 (14.62)	197.5 (7.78)	52.1 (2.05)	2.3 (0.09)	2,408.9 (94.84)
Source: Climatic Research Unit (CRU) of University of East Anglia (UEA)

== Economy ==
Key Economic Indicators for Bangladesh in 1975
National Income
	Current US$	Current BDT	% of GDP
GDP	$19.4 billion	BDT172.6 billion	
GDP growth (annual %)	-4.1%		
GDP per capita	$277.6	BDT2,464	
Agriculture, value added	$12.0 billion	BDT106.9 billion	62.0%
Industry, value added	$2.3 billion	BDT20.0 billion	11.6%
Services, etc., value added	$5.1 billion	BDT45.6 billion	26.4%

Note: For the year 1975 average official exchange rate for BDT was 12.19 per US$.

== Events ==
- 25 January: The fourth amendment of constitution abolishes parliamentary system and establishes presidential system.
- 25 February: Establishment of Bangladesh Krishak Sramik Awami League (BAKSAL) led by Mujib as the single legitimate political party.
- 15 August - Sheikh Mujibur Rahman is assassinated.
- 16 October - Rahima Banu's smallpox infection is reported. She is the last known person to have been infected with naturally occurring Variola major.
- 3 November: Jail Killing Day, assassination of four leaders of liberation war in prison.
- 7 November: After a successful coup d'état Major Gen. Ziaur Rahman proclaims himself deputy martial law administrator with Chief Justice Sayem as Chief Martial Law Administrator.
- 24 November: Col. Abu Taher arrested.

=== Sports ===
- Domestic football: Mohammedan SC won 1975 Dhaka First Division League title, while Team JIC came out runners-up.

== Births ==
- Ziaur Rahman Zia, musician
- Shafiq Tuhin, lyricist
- Abdul Aziz, filmmaker
- Sabrina Sultana, shooter
- Nazma Akter, labour leader
- Tazin Ahmed, actor

== Deaths ==
- 2 January - Siraj Sikder, revolutionary politician (b. 1944)
- 5 April - Bashiruddin Ahmad Majmadar, politician (b. 1898)
- 6 April - M A Rab, Chief of Staff of army (b. 1919)
- 6 April - Nurunnessa Khatun Vidyavinodini, novelist (b. 1894)
- 18 August - Shawkat Ali, politician (b. 1918)
- 3 November - Tajuddin Ahmed, Syed Nazrul Islam, A. H. M. Qamaruzzaman and Muhammad Mansur Ali
- 7 November - Brigadier General Khaled Mosharraf, Bir Protik (b. 1937)
- 7 November - A T M Haider, Bir Uttom (b. 1942)
- 26 November - Abul Hasan, poet (b. 1947)

== See also ==
- 1970s in Bangladesh
- List of Bangladeshi films of 1975
- Timeline of Bangladeshi history
