= 1978 in Bangladesh =

- Centuries: 20th; 21st
- Decades: 1950s; 1960s; 1970s; 1980s; 1990s
- See also: Other events of 1978; List of years in Bangladesh

1978 (MCMLXXVIII) was a common year starting on Sunday of the Gregorian calendar, the 1978th year of the Common Era (CE) and Anno Domini (AD) designations, the 978th year of the 2nd millennium, the 78th year of the 20th century, and the 9th year of the 1970s decade.

The year 1978 was the 7th year after the independence of Bangladesh. It was also the second year of the Government of Ziaur Rahman.

== Incumbents ==
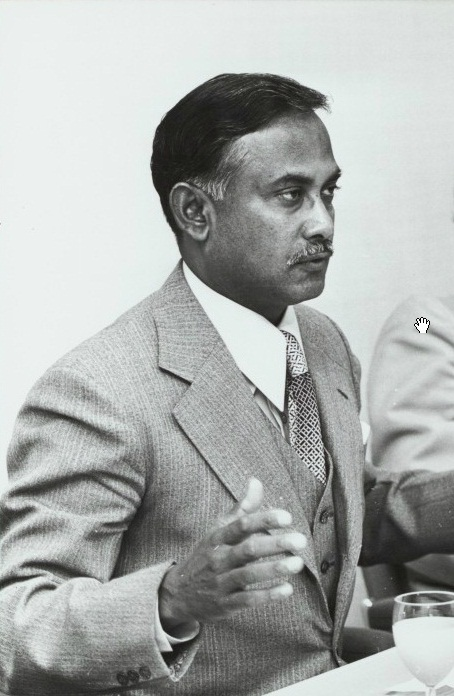
Ziaur
Rahman

- President: Ziaur Rahman
- Prime Minister: Mashiur Rahman (starting 29 June)
- Vice President: Abdus Sattar
- Chief Justice: Syed A. B. Mahmud Hossain (until 31 January), Kemaluddin Hossain (starting 1 February)

== Demography ==
Demographic Indicators for Bangladesh in 1978
Population, total	75,450,033
Population density (per km^{2})	579.6
Population growth (annual %)	2.7%
Male to Female Ratio (every 100 Female)	106.2
Urban population (% of total)	12.6%
Birth rate, crude (per 1,000 people)	44.0
Death rate, crude (per 1,000 people)	15.6
Mortality rate, under 5 (per 1,000 live births)	207
Life expectancy at birth, total (years)	51.5
Fertility rate, total (births per woman)	6.6

== Climate ==
Climate data for Bangladesh in 1978
Month	Jan	Feb	Mar	Apr	May	Jun	Jul	Aug	Sep	Oct	Nov	Dec	Year
Daily mean °C (°F)	16.9 (62.4)	20.1 (68.2)	23.9 (75.0)	26.9 (80.4)	27.3 (81.1)	27.5 (81.5)	27.9 (82.2)	28.6 (83.5)	27.7 (81.9)	27.5 (81.5)	24.2 (75.6)	19.7 (67.5)	24.9 (76.8)
Average precipitation mm (inches)	.7 (0.03)	8.3 (0.33)	26.2 (1.03)	152.7 (6.01)	379.4 (14.94)	493.8 (19.44)	400. (15.7)	366. (14.4)	372.3 (14.66)	105.8 (4.17)	9.9 (0.39)	1.1 (0.04)	2,316.1 (91.19)
Source: Climatic Research Unit (CRU) of University of East Anglia (UEA)

== Economy ==
Key Economic Indicators for Bangladesh in 1978
National Income
	Current US$	Current BDT	% of GDP
GDP	$13.3 billion	BDT200.8 billion	
GDP growth (annual %)	7.1%		
GDP per capita	$176.0	BDT2,662	
Agriculture, value added	$7.2 billion	BDT108.9 billion	54.3%
Industry, value added	$1.9 billion	BDT28.7 billion	14.3%
Services, etc., value added	$4.2 billion	BDT63.1 billion	31.4%
Balance of Payment
	Current US$	Current BDT	% of GDP
Current account balance	-$383.9 million		-2.9%
Imports of goods and services	$1,592.7 million	BDT31.1 billion	15.5%
Exports of goods and services	$650.3 million	BDT11.2 billion	5.6%
Foreign direct investment, net inflows	$7.7 million		0.1%
Personal remittances, received	$115.4 million		0.9%
Total reserves (includes gold) at year end	$321.3 million		
Total reserves in months of imports	2.3		

Note: For the year 1978 average official exchange rate for BDT was 15.02 per US$.

== Events ==
- 18 February - Boxing legend, Muhammad Ali arrives in Bangladesh for a 5-day visit.
- 3 June - Ziaur Rahman wins the presidential election and secures his position for a five-year term.
- 28 June - The ashes of Atiśa Dipankara Shrijnana are brought to Bangladesh from Tibet.
- Bangladesh is elected to a two-year term on the UN Security Council.
- As a result of Operation King Dragon by the Burmese junta, the first wave of Rohingya refugees entered Bangladesh in 1978. An estimated 200,000 Rohingyas took shelter in Cox's Bazar. Diplomatic initiatives over 16 months resulted in a repatriation agreement, which allowed the return of most refugees under a process facilitated by UNHCR.

=== Awards and recognitions ===
==== International Recognition ====
- Tahrunessa Abdullah, A social worker who championed the role of women in improving their families' livelihoods, was awarded Ramon Magsaysay Award.

==== Independence Day Award ====
Recipients	Area	Note
Jasimuddin	literature	posthumous
Dr. Mazharul Haque	education	posthumous
Ranada Prasad Saha	social welfare	posthumous
Dr. Muhammad Ibrahim	social welfare	
Shah Muhammad Hasanuzzaman	science and technology	
Abdul Ahad	music	
Mahfuzul Haque	rural development	
Alamgir M. A. Kabir	population control	

==== Ekushey Padak ====
1. Khan Mohammad Moinuddin (literature)
2. Ahsan Habib (literature)
3. Zulfikar Haidar (literature)
4. Mahbubul Alam (literature)
5. Natyaguru Nurul Momen (literature)
6. Ava Alam (music)
7. Safiuddin Ahmed (art)
8. Serajuddin Hossain (journalism)
9. Sayed Moazzem Hossain (art)

=== Sports ===
- International football: 1978 AFC Youth Championship are held in Dhaka, Bangladesh from 5 October to 28 October 1978.
- Domestic football: Mohammedan SC won the 1978 Dhaka First Division League title, while Brothers Union came out runners-up.

== Births ==
- Ananta Jalil, actor, director, businessman
- Nafees Bin Zafar, software engineer

== Deaths ==
- 17 January: Muzaffar Ahmed Chowdhury, academician (b. 1922)
- 4 March: Abul Kalam Shamsuddin, author (b. 1897)
- 29 March: Ibrahim Khan, writer (b. 1894)
- 18 June: Zahidur Rahim, music exponent (b. 1935)
- 13 August: Muhammad Siddiq Khan, librarian (b. 1910)

== See also ==
- 1970s in Bangladesh
- List of Bangladeshi films of 1978
- Timeline of Bangladeshi history
