= 1970s in Bangladesh =

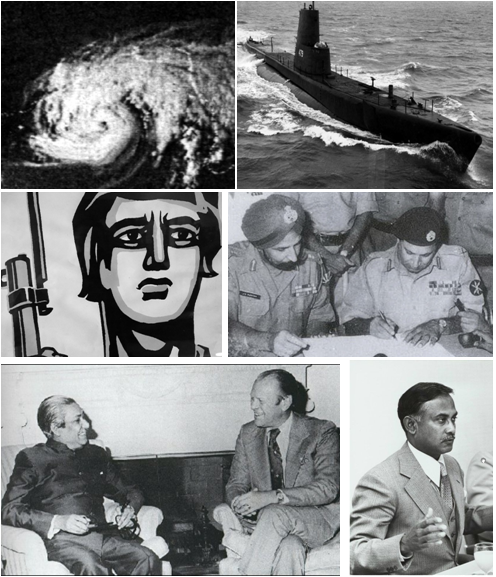
A montage of notable people of and events of Bangladesh in the 1970s including (clockwise from top left): Image of the Bhola cyclone taken on 11 November 1970; Pakistan's PNS Ghazi sank in 1971 during Indo-Pakistani War of 1971; Lt Gen Niazi signing the Instrument of Surrender under the gaze of Lt Gen Aurora at Dhaka on 16 December 1971; President Ziaur Rahman; Bangladesh PM Sheikh Mujib and US President Gerald Ford meeting in the Oval Office in 1974; and a poster portraying a Freedom Fighter in Bangladesh Liberation War.

The 1970s (pronounced "nineteen-seventies", commonly abbreviated as the "Seventies") was a decade of the Gregorian calendar that began on 1 January 1970 and ended on 31 December 1979. It was a very significant decade in the history of Bangladesh because this is the decade in which Bangladesh emerged as a sovereign state. The decade began with a devastating cyclone that ravaged the southern part of the country. The next year the country entered into a liberation war and achieved independence from Pakistan. The government of Sheikh Mujibur Rahman administered the newly formed country between 1972 and 1975, but their rule soon came to an end through a series of coups and countercoups in the later part of the decade. Economically, the country struggled because of the war (1971) and famine (1974) throughout the decade and was highly dependent on foreign aid. Culturally, Bangladesh started to establish its own identity as an independent nation.

== Politics and national life ==
=== Tension between the two factions of Pakistan ===
The 1970s started with Bangladesh as part of erstwhile Pakistan amid intense political tension between the two factions of the country - East (later Bangladesh) and the West (later Pakistan). The East Pakistanis observed that the West Pakistani establishment would swiftly depose any East Pakistani elected Prime Minister of Pakistan, such as Khawaja Nazimuddin, Mohammad Ali Bogra, or Huseyn Shaheed Suhrawardy. Their suspicions were further aggravated by the military dictatorships of Ayub Khan (27 October 1958 – 25 March 1969) and Yahya Khan (25 March 1969 – 20 December 1971), both West Pakistanis. The situation reached a climax in 1970, when the Bangladesh Awami League, the largest East Pakistani political party, led by Sheikh Mujibur Rahman, won a landslide victory in the national elections. The party won 167 of the 169 seats allotted to East Pakistan, and thus a majority of the 313 seats in the National Assembly. This gave the Awami League the constitutional right to form a government. However, Zulfikar Ali Bhutto (a former Foreign Minister), the leader of the Pakistan Peoples Party, refused to allow Rahman to become the Prime Minister of Pakistan. Instead, he proposed the idea of having two Prime Ministers, one for each wing. The proposal elicited outrage in the east wing, already chafing under the other constitutional innovation, the "One Unit scheme". Bhutto also refused to accept Rahman's Six Points. On 3 March 1971, the two leaders of the two wings along with the President General Yahya Khan met in Dacca to decide the fate of the country. After their discussions yielded no satisfactory results, Sheikh Mujibur Rahman called for a nationwide strike. Bhutto feared a civil war, therefore, he sent his trusted companion, Mubashir Hassan. A message was conveyed, and Rahman decided to meet Bhutto. Upon his arrival, Rahman met with Bhutto and both agreed to form a coalition government with Rahman as Premier and Bhutto as president. However, the military was unaware of these developments, and Bhutto increased his pressure on Rahman to reach a decision.

The talks proved unsuccessful, however, and on 1 March 1971, Pakistani President Yahya Khan indefinitely postponed the pending National Assembly session, precipitating massive civil disobedience in East Pakistan.

On 2 March 1971, a group of students, led by A S M Abdur Rob, a student leader, raised the new (proposed) flag of Bangladesh under the direction of the Swadhin Bangla Nucleus. They demanded that Sheikh Mujibur Rahman declare the independence of Bangladesh immediately but Mujibur Rahman refused to agree to this demand. Rather, he decided that he would declare his next steps at a public meeting to be held on 7 March.

On 3 March, student leader, Shahjahan Siraj, read the 'Sadhinotar Ishtehar' (Declaration of independence) at Paltan Maidan in front of Bangabandhu Sheikh Mujib at a public gathering under the direction of the Swadhin Bangla Nucleus.

On 7 March, there was a public gathering in Suhrawardy Udyan to hear updates on the ongoing movement from Bangabandhu Sheikh Mujib, the leader of the movement that time. Although he avoided directly referring to independence, as the talks were still underway, he warned his listeners to prepare for any imminent war. The speech is considered a key moment in the war of liberation, and is remembered for the phrase,

"Ebarer Shongram Amader Muktir Shongram, Ebarer Shongram Shadhinotar Shongram...."
"Our struggle this time is a struggle for our freedom, our struggle this time is a struggle for our independence...."

=== Bhola cyclone ===
The 1970 Bhola cyclone made landfall on the East Pakistan coastline during the evening of 12 November, around the same time as a local high tide, killing an estimated 300,000 to 500,000 people. Though the exact death toll is not known, it is considered the deadliest tropical cyclone on record. A week after the landfall, President Khan conceded that his government had made "slips" and "mistakes" in its handling of the relief efforts due to a lack of understanding of the magnitude of the disaster.

A statement released by eleven political leaders in East Pakistan ten days after the cyclone hit charged the government with "gross neglect, callous and utter indifference". They also accused the president of playing down the magnitude of the problem in news coverage. On 19 November, students held a march in Dacca protesting the slowness of the government's response. Abdul Hamid Khan Bhashani addressed a rally of 50,000 people on 24 November, where he accused the president of inefficiency and demanded his resignation.

As the conflict between East and West Pakistan developed in March, the Dacca offices of the two government organisations directly involved in relief efforts were closed for at least two weeks, first by a general strike and then by a ban on government work in East Pakistan by the Awami League. With this increase in tension, foreign personnel were evacuated over fears of violence. Relief work continued in the field, but long-term planning was curtailed. This conflict widened into the Bangladesh Liberation War in December and concluded with the creation of Bangladesh. This was one of the first times that a natural event helped trigger a civil war.

=== Formal declaration of independence ===
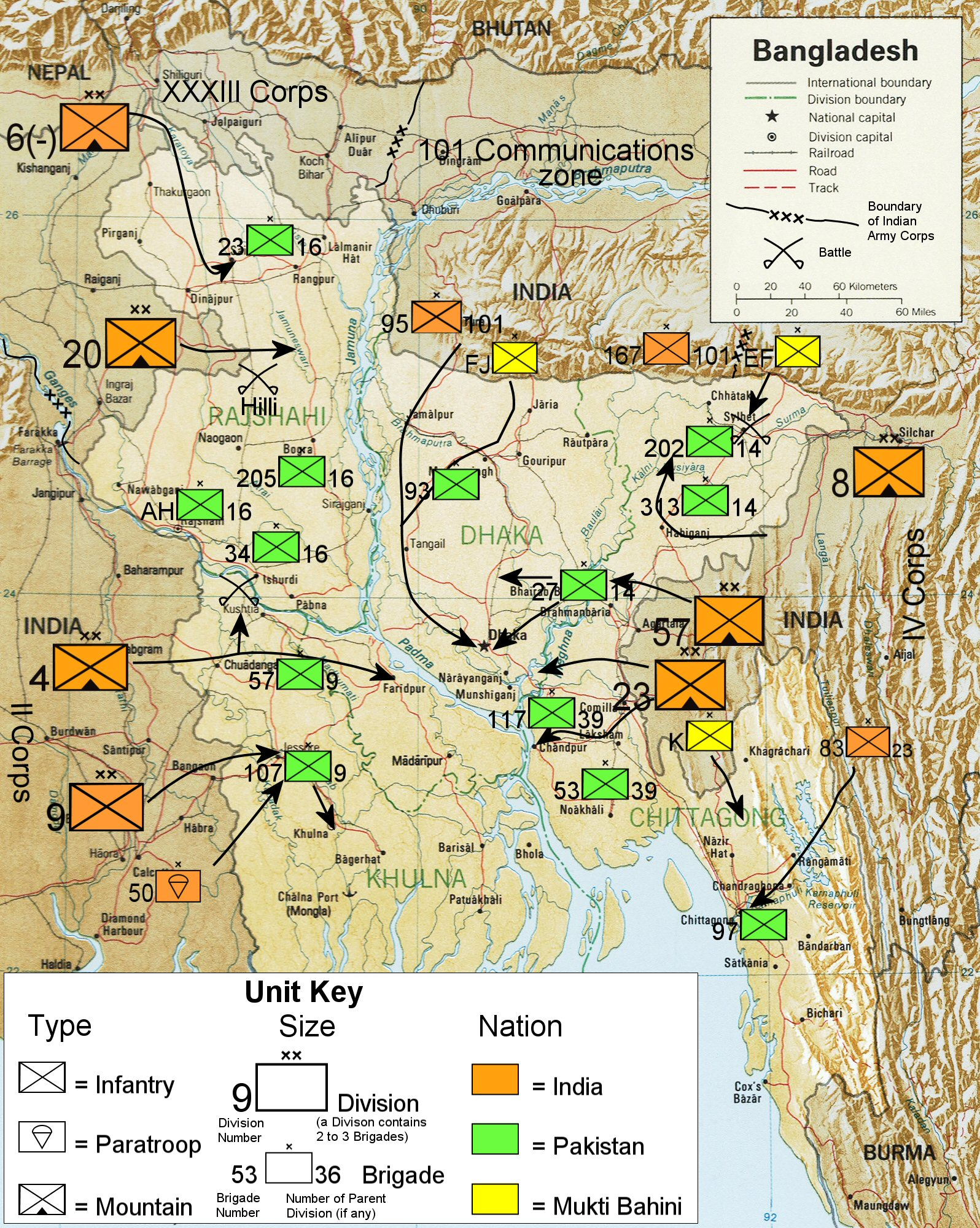
Illustration showing military units and troop movements during the war.

In the early hours of 26 March 1971, a military crackdown by the Pakistan army began. The Bangabandhu Sheikh Mujibur Rahman was arrested, and the political leaders dispersed, mostly fleeing to neighbouring India, where they organised a provisional government. Before being arrested by the Pakistani Army, Sheikh Mujibur Rahman passed a hand written note which contained the Bangladeshi Declaration of Independence. This note was widely circulated and transmitted by the then East Pakistan Rifles' wireless transmitter. The world press reports from late March 1971 also make sure that Bangladesh's declaration of independence by Bangabandhu was widely reported throughout the world. Bengali Army officer Major Ziaur Rahman captured the Kalurghat Radio Station in Chittagong and read the declaration of independence of Bangladesh during the evening hours on 27 March.

This is Swadhin Bangla Betar Kendra. I, Major Ziaur Rahman, at the direction of Bangobondhu Mujibur Rahman, hereby declare that the Independent People's Republic of Bangladesh has been established. At his direction, I have taken command as the temporary Head of the Republic. In the name of Sheikh Mujibur Rahman, I call upon all Bengalees to rise against the attack by the West Pakistani Army. We shall fight to the last to free our motherland. Victory is, by the Grace of Allah, ours. Joy Bangla.

The Provisional Government of the People's Republic of Bangladesh was formed on 10 April in Meherpur (later renamed as Mujibnagar, a town adjacent to the Indian border). Sheikh Mujibur Rahman was announced to be the Head of the State. Tajuddin Ahmed became the Prime Minister, Syed Nazrul Islam became the acting president and Khondaker Mostaq Ahmed the Foreign Minister. There the war plan was sketched out with Bangladesh armed forces established and named "Muktifoujo". Later these forces were named "Muktibahini" (freedom fighters). M. A. G. Osmani was appointed as the Chief of the Armed Forces.

For military purposes, Bangladesh was divided into 11 sectors under 11 sector commanders. In addition to these sectors, later in the war, three special forces were formed: Z Force, S Force and K Force. These three forces' names were derived from the initial letters of the commander's name. The training and most of the arms and ammunitions were arranged by the Meherpur government which was supported by India. As fighting grew between the Pakistan Army and the Bengali Mukti Bahini, an estimated ten million Bengalis, mainly Hindus, sought refuge in the Indian states of Assam, Tripura and West Bengal.

The crisis in East Pakistan produced new strains in Pakistan's troubled relations with India. The two nations had fought a war in 1965, mainly in the west, but the pressure of millions of refugees escaping into India in autumn 1971, as well as Pakistani aggression, reignited Indian hostilities with Pakistan. Indian sympathies lay with East Pakistan, and on 3 December 1971, India intervened on the side of the Bangladeshis which led to a short, but violent, two-week war known as the Indo-Pakistani War of 1971.

=== Pakistani capitulation and aftermath ===
On 16 December 1971, Lt. Gen A. A. K. Niazi, CO of Pakistan Army forces located in East Pakistan signed the Instrument of Surrender and the nation of Bangla Desh ("Country of Bengal") was finally established the following day. At the time of surrender only a few countries had provided diplomatic recognition to the new nation. Over 90,000 Pakistani troops surrendered to the Indian forces making it the largest surrender since World War II. The new country changed its name to Bangladesh on 11 January 1972 and became a parliamentary democracy under a constitution. Shortly thereafter on 19 March Bangladesh signed a friendship treaty with India. Bangladesh sought admission in the UN with most voting in its favour, but China vetoed this as Pakistan was its key ally. To ensure a smooth transition, in 1972 the Simla Agreement was signed between India and Pakistan. The treaty ensured that Pakistan recognised the independence of Bangladesh in exchange for the return of the Pakistani PoWs. India treated all the PoWs in strict accordance with the Geneva Convention, rule 1925. It released more than 93,000 Pakistani PoWs in five months.

Furthermore, as a gesture of goodwill, nearly 200 soldiers who were sought for war crimes by Bengalis were also pardoned by India. The accord also gave back more than 13,000 km^{2} (5,019 sq mi) of land that Indian troops had seized in West Pakistan during the war, though India retained a few strategic areas; most notably Kargil (which would in turn again be the focal point for a war between the two nations in 1999).

=== Sheikh Mujibur Rahman administration ===
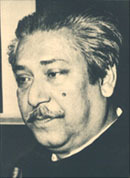
Sheikh Mujibur Rahman

Upon his release on 10 January 1972, Sheikh Mujibur Rahman briefly assumed the provisional presidency and later took office as the prime minister, heading all organs of government and decision-making. The politicians elected in 1970 formed the provisional parliament of the new state. The Mukti Bahini and other militias amalgamated to form a new Bangladeshi army to which Indian forces transferred control on 17 March. The government faced serious challenges, which including the rehabilitation of millions of people displaced in 1971, organising the supply of food, health aids and other necessities. The effects of the 1970 cyclone had not worn off, and the state's economy had immensely deteriorated by the conflict.

Mujib helped Bangladesh enter into the United Nations and the Non-Aligned Movement. He travelled to the United States, the United Kingdom and other European nations to obtain humanitarian and developmental assistance for the nation. He signed a treaty of friendship with India, which pledged extensive economic and humanitarian assistance and began training Bangladesh's security forces and government personnel. Mujib forged a close friendship with Indira Gandhi, strongly praising India's decision to intercede, and professed admiration and friendship for India. Major efforts were launched to rehabilitate an estimated 10 million refugees. The economy began recovering and a famine was prevented. A constitution was proclaimed in 1973 and elections were held, which resulted in Mujib and his party gaining power with an absolute majority. He further outlined state programmes to expand primary education, sanitation, food, healthcare, water and electric supply across the country. A five-year plan released in 1973 focused state investments into agriculture, rural infrastructure and cottage industries.

In 1974, Bangladesh experienced the deadliest famine ever, which killed around 1.5 million Bangladeshi people from hunger. The Bangladesh famine of 1974 is a major source of discontent against Mujib's government. Bangladeshi people feel ashamed, insulted and demoralised as a nation for this famine that was not due to a food crisis.

==== Left wing insurgency ====
At the height of Sheikh Mujib's power, left wing insurgents, organised by Jatiyo Samajtantrik Dal's armed wing Gonobahini fought against the government of Sheikh Mujibur Rahman, to establish a Marxist government.

The government responded by forming the Jatiya Rakkhi Bahini which began a campaign of brutal human rights abuses against the general populace, including the force became involved in numerous charges of human rights abuse including political killings, shooting by death squads, and rape. Members of Jatiyo Rakkhi Bahini were granted immunity from prosecution and other legal proceedings.

==== Bangladesh Krishak Sramik Awami League (BAKSAL) ====
According to Abdur Razzaq, the 1974 famine profoundly affected Mujib's views on governance, while political unrest gave rise to increasing violence. During the famine, 70,000 people were reported as dead (Note: Reports vary). In response, he began increasing his powers. On 25 January 1975 Mujib declared a state of emergency and his political supporters approved a constitutional amendment banning all opposition political parties. Mujib assumed the presidency and was given extraordinary powers. His political supporters amalgamated to form the only legalised political party, the Bangladesh Krishak Sramik Awami League, commonly known by its initials—BAKSAL. The party identified itself with the rural masses, farmers and labourers and took control of government machinery. It also launched major socialist programmes. Using government forces and a militia of supporters called the Jatiyo Rakkhi Bahini, Mujib clamped down on any opposition to him. The militia known as RakhiBahini and police were accused of torturing suspects and political killings. While retaining support from many segments of the population, Mujib evoked anger amongst veterans of the liberation war for what was seen as a betrayal of the causes of democracy and civil rights.

==== Assassination of Sheikh Mujibur Rahman and aftermath ====
On 15 August 1975, a group of junior army officers invaded the presidential residence with tanks and killed Mujib, his family and personal staff. Only his daughters Sheikh Hasina Wajed and Sheikh Rehana, who were visiting West Germany, escaped. They were banned from returning to Bangladesh. The coup was planned by disgruntled Awami League colleagues and military officers, which included Mujib's colleague and former confidanté Khondaker Mostaq Ahmad, who became his immediate successor. There was intense speculation in the media accusing the US Central Intelligence Agency of having instigated the plot. Lawrence Lifschultz has alleged that the CIA was involved in the coup and assassination, basing his assumption on the then US ambassador in Dhaka Eugene Booster.

Mujib's death plunged the nation into many years of political turmoil. The coup leaders were soon overthrown and a series of counter-coups and political assassinations paralysed the country. Order was largely restored after a coup in 1977 gave control to the army chief Ziaur Rahman. Declaring himself president in 1978, Ziaur Rahman signed the Indemnity Ordinance, giving immunity from prosecution to the men who plotted Mujib's assassination and overthrow.

=== Ziaur Rahman administration, 1975–81 ===
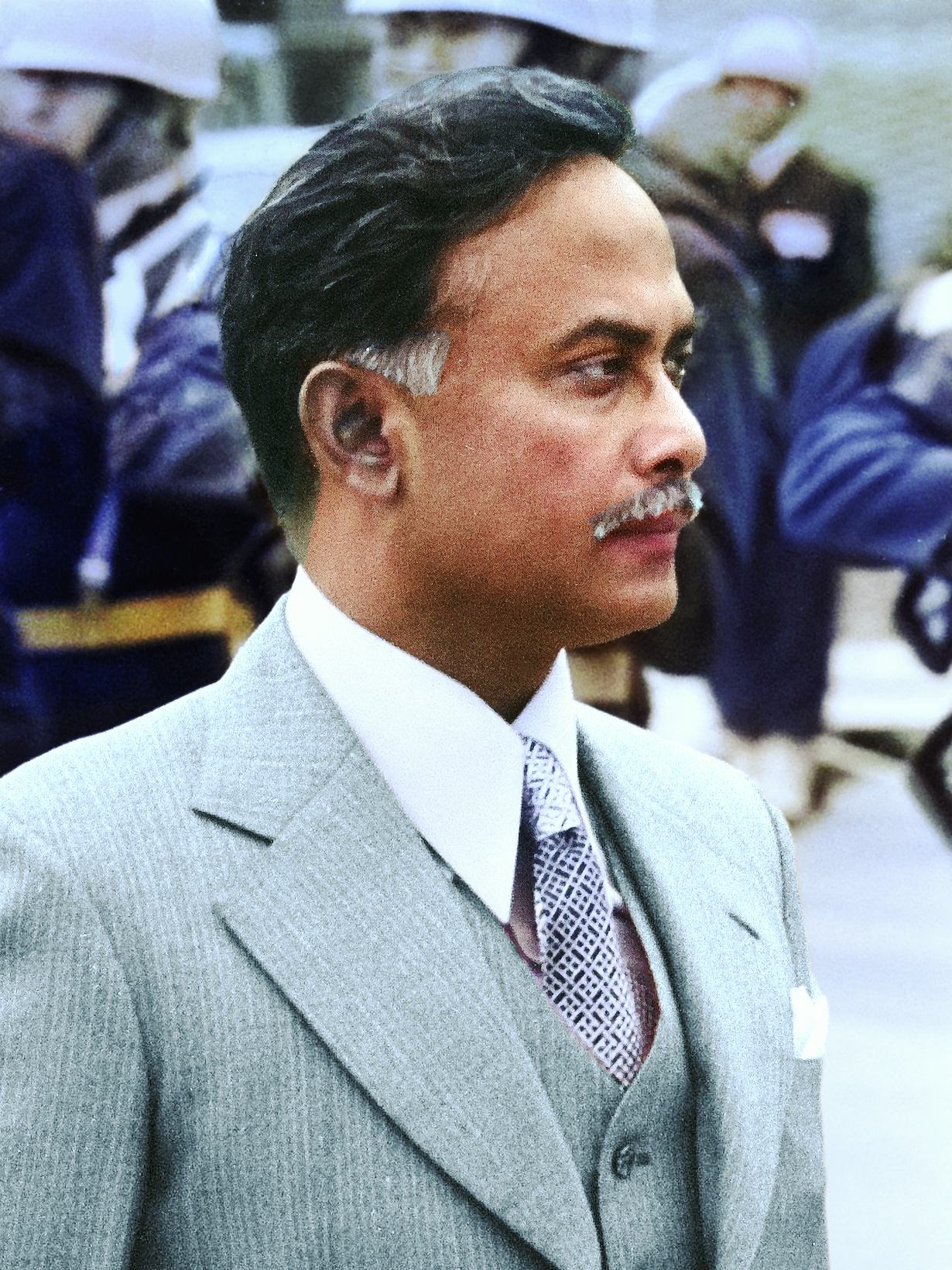
Ziaur Rahman in 1979

Successive military coups resulted in the emergence of Army Chief of Staff General Ziaur Rahman ("Zia") as strongman. He pledged the army's support to the civilian government headed by President Chief Justice Sayem. Acting at Zia's behest, Sayem dissolved Parliament, promising fresh elections in 1977, and instituted martial law.

Acting behind the scenes of the Martial Law Administration (MLA), Zia sought to invigorate government policy and administration. While continuing the ban on political parties, he sought to revitalise the demoralised bureaucracy, to begin new economic development programs, and to emphasise family planning. In November 1976, Zia became Chief Martial Law Administrator (CMLA) and assumed the presidency upon Sayem's retirement five months later, promising national elections in 1978.

As President, Zia announced a 19-point program of economic reform and began dismantling the MLA. Keeping his promise to hold elections, Zia won a five-year term in June 1978 elections, with 76% of the vote. In November 1978, his government removed the remaining restrictions on political party activities in time for parliamentary elections in February 1979. These elections, which were contested by more than 30 parties, marked the culmination of Zia's transformation of Bangladesh's Government from the MLA to a democratically elected, constitutional one. The AL and the Bangladesh Nationalist Party (BNP), founded by Zia, emerged as the two major parties.

== Administrative divisions ==
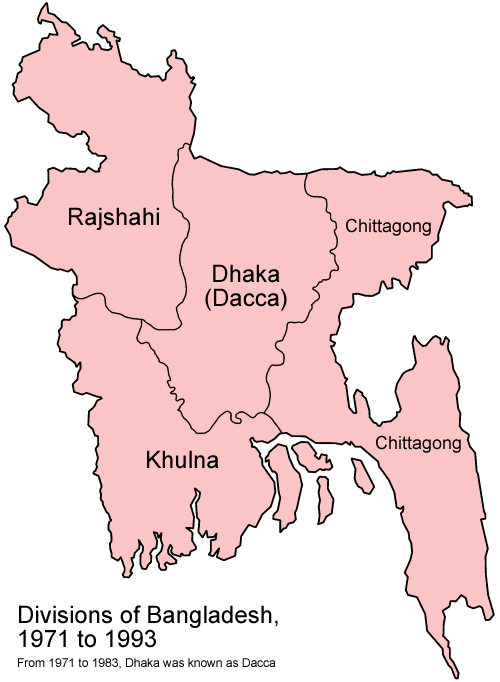

In the 1970s, Bangladesh used to be administratively divided into 4 divisions, namely Dhaka, Chittagong, Khulna and Rajshahi which were further subdivided into a total of 17 districts (See List of districts of Bangladesh). After the independence, President's Order 7 issued in 1972 dissolved all the existing local government bodies and the names of the Union Council and District Council were changed to Union Panchayet and Zila Board, respectively. The Constitution of 1972 included specific provisions relating to the basic structure and functions of local bodies. Article 9 provided for the formation of local bodies at every administrative units to be composed of elected representatives of the areas concerned. In 1976, the Local Government Ordinance (LGO) issued by the government of General Ziaur Rahman made provisions for the formation of three types of rural local government, Union Parishad, Thana Parishad and Zila Parishad. In 1978, Jamalpur was upgraded to a District.

== Demographics ==
Based on World Development Indicators published by the World Bank the population of Bangladesh grew from 63 million at the beginning of the decade to 79 million by the end. This signifies an annual population growth rate of 2.3%. Population density increased from 487 to 609 per km^{2}.

The urban population was 7.6% of the total at the beginning, which ended up at 13.7%. Dhaka, the largest city, with a population of 1.4 million, accounted for 27.8% of the total urban population by 1979. United Nations World Population Prospects show that the population growth rate was in increasing trend (from 2.5% per annum to 2.8%), despite reduction in fertility rate (births per woman) from 6.9 to 6.5. Life expectancy at birth increased from 47.5 years to 52.9 years with Child (0–5) mortality reducing from 224 per 1,000 births to 203. Age dependency ratio (% of working-age population) changed from 91.0% to 92.6% by the end of the decade.

== Climate ==
Climate data for Bangladesh in 1970s
Month	Jan	Feb	Mar	Apr	May	Jun	Jul	Aug	Sep	Oct	Nov	Dec	Year
Daily mean °C (°F)	18.2 (64.8)	20.4 (68.7)	25.0 (77.0)	27.5 (81.5)	27.9 (82.2)	27.9 (82.2)	27.8 (82.0)	27.9 (82.2)	27.8 (82.0)	26.9 (80.4)	23.5 (74.3)	19.2 (66.6)	25.0 (77.0)
Average precipitation mm (inches)	6.0 (0.24)	16.7 (0.66)	38.2 (1.50)	126.2 (4.97)	261.6 (10.30)	457.4 (18.01)	516.0 (20.31)	397.0 (15.63)	330.5 (13.01)	159.8 (6.29)	40.8 (1.61)	12.0 (0.47)	2,362.2 (93)
Source: Climatic Research Unit (CRU) of University of East Anglia (UEA)

Compared to prior decade the October and November became warmer by about 0.5 degree Celsius and February and May became cooler by similar magnitude. Thus overall temperature profile became more moderate. Average rainfall decreased for June by about 59mm and increased for September by about 69mm. Average annual rainfall increased by about 74mm.

== Economy ==
=== National income and balance of payment ===
Bangladesh GDP was US$26.4 billion in 1970, which grew to US$28.4 billion in 1979 (in 2010 constant dollar) signifying a mere 0.7% annual growth. Agricultural Sector was by far the largest sector contributing 54.6% of GDP in the beginning of the decade, which slightly decreased to 52.5% by the end. During the same period contribution from the industrial sector increased from 8.7% to 15.7% and that of the service sector decreased from 36.7% to 31.9%. Per capita GDP decreased from US$406 to US$358 (in 2010 constant dollar).

According to World Development Indicators published by the World Bank, in 2010 constant dollar basis, Bangladesh used to export US$0.9 billion (8.3% of GDP) worth of goods and services as of 1970, which grew at annual average rate of 3.3% to US$1.2 billion (6.1% of GDP) in 1979. In contrast, by 1979 imports stood at US$3.4 billion (15.8% of GDP). Over the decade, Foreign Direct Investment and Personal Remittances Receipt averaged 0.02% and 0.74% of GDP; while, total Reserve averaged at 13.4% of external debt and 2.4 month's coverage of import.

Gross National Income (at 2010 constant dollar) grew from US$22.3 billion in 1973 to US$28.4 billion in 1979. At the beginning of this period External Debt stock (of which concessional debt was 71.8%) was of 6.1% of gross national income (GNI) and External Debt Service burden was 0.1% of GNI. By the end of the decade, External Debt stock (of which concessional debt then was 80.3%) stood at 19.1% of GNI and External Debt Service burden was 1.3% of the same. During the same period Military expenditure increased from 0.6% to 0.9% of GNI.

=== Agriculture ===
During this decade, crop production grew at an annual average rate of 0.9% driven by cereal production increase from 16.9 million metric tons to 19.7 million (implying annual growth of 1.5%) - enabled by improvement in cereal yield from 1666.2 kg per hectare to 1870.9 kg. At the same time, livestock production grew at annual 2.7% and fisheries production decreased at annual 0.6%. Altogether these contributed to overall food production increase by annualized rate of 1.2%.

The catastrophic famine of 1974 led to the death of tens of thousands of people due to starvation caused by inadequate food production and the withholding of food shipments by the US government.

=== Industrial and service sectors ===
Net value addition from industrial sector, which stood at US$3.8 billion in 1970 (in 2010 constant USD), grew at average annual rate of 1.1% to US$4.2 billion by 1979 (in the same constant USD basis). Manufacturing sector contributed 62.1% of industrial value added in the beginning of this period and it gradually changed to 66.1% by the end. By 1979 manufacturers export accounted for 64.5% of total merchandise export while import supporting the manufacturing segment accounted for 55.2% of total merchandise import. In that year, textile and garments accounted for 37.0% of the value addition of the manufacturing sector. In 1973-74 there were 1,427 industrial establishments in the country employing 0.31 million staffs. By 1979-80 the number of establishment grew to 3,006 and employment in the sector grew to 0.42 million.

On the other hand, net value addition from the service sector amounting US$14.2 billion in 1970, also grew at average annual rate of 1.3% and stood at US$16.1 billion by 1979 (in 2010 constant USD).

Some of the major business houses / enterprises that started journey in this decade include the Beximco, City Group, T K Group of Industries and BRAC in 1972, Jamuna Group and Milk Vita in 1974, Concord Group and Otobi in 1975, Meghna Group of Industries in 1976, Nasir Group in 1977, BRAC's business venture Aarong in 1978 and Rangs Group in 1979. In the public sector BTCL was established in 1971 followed by Petrobangla, Bangladesh Shipping Corporation and Biman Bangladesh Airlines in 1972, Bangladesh Petroleum Corporation in 1976 and Bangladesh Machine Tools Factory in 1979.

== Infrastructure ==
=== Transportation ===
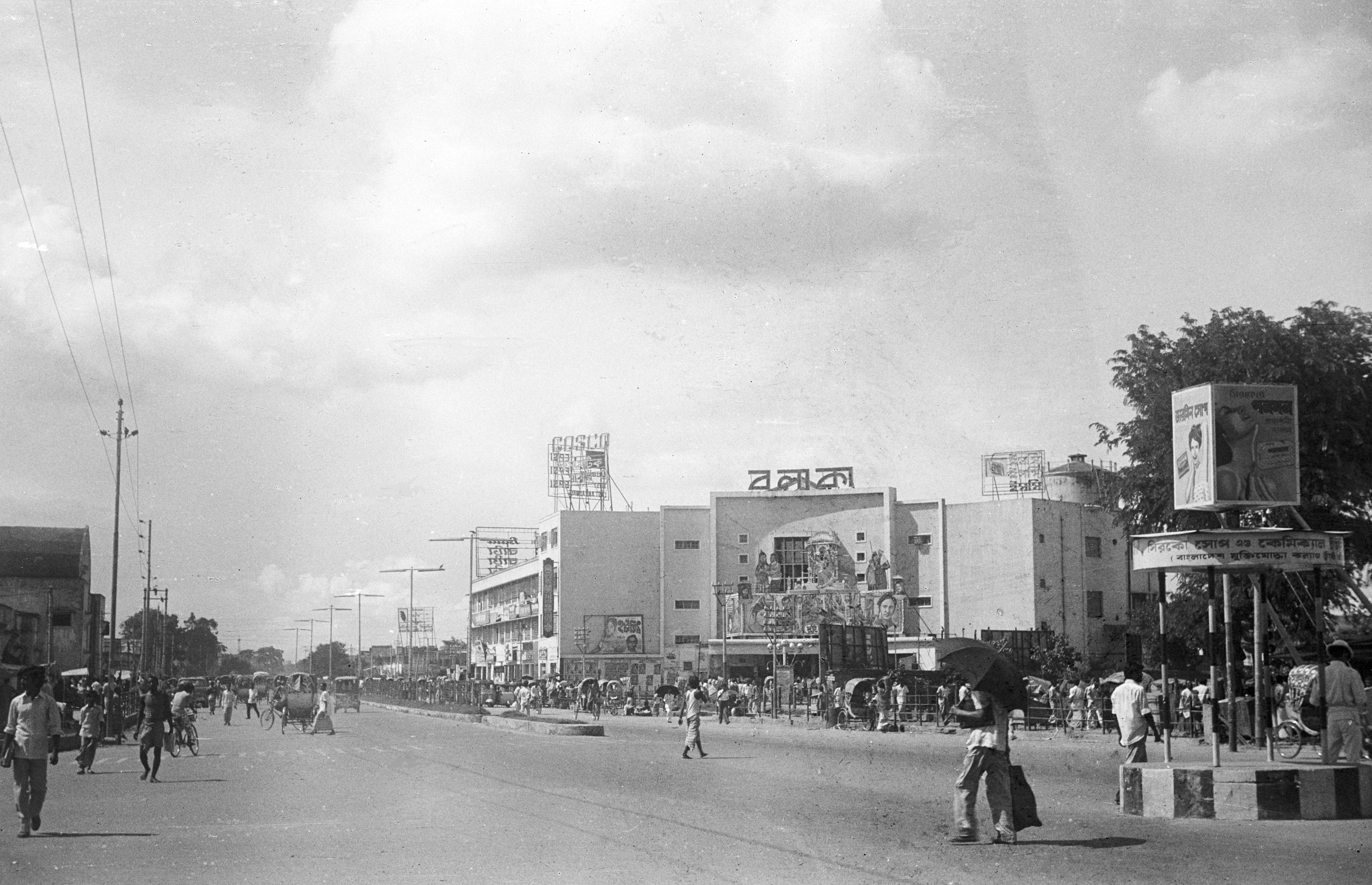
Dhaka roads had much fewer traffic in the 1970s.

When Bangladesh achieved independence in 1971, it inherited 3,860 km of pucca roads, 2858.73 km of railway tracks and 466 railway stations, but most roads and connecting bridges were in shambles due to the ravage of the war. After the independence war-ravaged roads, culverts and bridges were reconstructed fast and some new bridges on the national highways were built. All the district headquarters were connected with the national highway network. The construction of double line track between Dhaka-Tangi and Chittagong-Mirsharai started in 1960s. These lines were opened in phases during the 1960s and 1970s.

At the time of independence, Bangladesh had 5 inland river ports at Dhaka, Narayanganj, Chandpur, Barisal and Khulna. In 1975 a new port was added at Patuakhali. Air Transport also started to develop. As of 1973, there were 13,500 registered carrier departures worldwide which grew to 14,800 by 1979. During the same period number of passenger carried increased from 0.49 million to 0.62 million per annum.

A UNDP funded Bangladesh Transportation Sector Study executed by World Bank in 1988 estimated that by 1975 the ground transport system of Bangladesh was already supporting 17 billion km of passenger commute and 2.6 billion km of freight transport. Road network accounted for 54% of the passengers and 35% of the freight whereas 30% of the passengers and 28% of the freight were transported using the rail network. The rest were using inland water transport.

=== Telecommunication ===
The erstwhile Telegraph branch under Posts and Telegraph Department of the government was reconstructed as Bangladesh Telegraph and Telephone Department under Ministry of Posts and Telecommunications in 1971 and again as Telegraph and Telephone Board in 1975. In 1979 Bangladesh Telegraph and Telephone Board (BTTB) was given the right to issue license for telecom and wireless services. In the beginning of the decade there were 45,000 fixed telephone line subscription in the country - which increased to 89,000 by the end signifying 0.07 lines per 100 people.

=== Energy ===
Through Presidential Order 59 of 31 May 1972, Bangladesh Power Development Board (BPDB) was entrusted with the responsibilities of operation, maintenance, and development of generation, transmission & distribution facilities of electricity throughout the country. A separate division of the Ministry of Energy oversaw oil and gas while Petrobangla, established in 1974, became the main state oil and gas operator. Later, Rural Electrification Board (REB) was established for the development of electricity in the rural areas for the effective benefit of rural people in October 1977.

In 1973 per capital electric power consumption was 15.2 kWh, which increased to 21.0 kWh by 1979. During the same period per capita energy usage increased from 92.5 kg of oil equivalent to 99.4 kg and fossil fuel energy consumption increased from 24.2% to 29.4% of total.

In 1973 the electricity produced in the country was coming from hydroelectric sources: 23.6%, natural gas sources: 34.7% and oil sources: 41.7%. By 1979 the same distribution changed to - hydroelectric sources: 24.4%, natural gas sources: 45.6% and oil sources: 29.9%.

=== Financial services ===
At the time of independence the country inherited a very limited financial set-up consisting of 1130 branches of 12 commercial banks, the Dhaka Stock Exchange, several insurance companies established between 1958 and 1971, and the Samabaya (co-operative) Bank Ltd.

Bangladesh Bank, the central bank of the country, was established in Dhaka as a body corporate vide the Bangladesh Bank Order, 1972 (P.O No. 127 of 1972). Bangladesh Bank started operating with all capital and liabilities of the Dhaka branch of State Bank of Pakistan. The 12 banks which were inherited were soon nationalised and merged into six banks, naming them -Sonali, Agrani, Janata, Rupali, Pubali and Uttara. Later IFIC Bank was established as a private bank in 1976.

The number of insurance companies that had business in East Pakistan was 75, of which 10 were locally incorporated ones. Following the independence of Bangladesh in 1971, both life and general insurance business in the country was nationalised under the Bangladesh Insurance (Nationalisation) Order 1972 except foreign insurance companies. Five corporations were established to absorb, own and control the businesses of the 75 existing insurance companies and these new corporations were Bangladesh Jatiya Bima Corporation, Karnafuli Bima Corporation, Tista Bima Corporation, Surma Jiban Bima Corporation and Rupsa Jiban Bima Corporation. These four corporations were in business from 1 January 1973 to 14 May 1973. Later they were gradually merged into two entities named Jiban Bima Corporation (for life insurance) and Sadharan Bima Corporation (for general insurance).

The activity of Dhaka Stock Exchange remained suspended until 1976, when it renewed operations with nine listed companies having paid up capital of Tk 137.52 million. This, along with the establishment of the Investment Corporation of Bangladesh in the same year marked the launch of the country's capital market operations.

=== Education ===
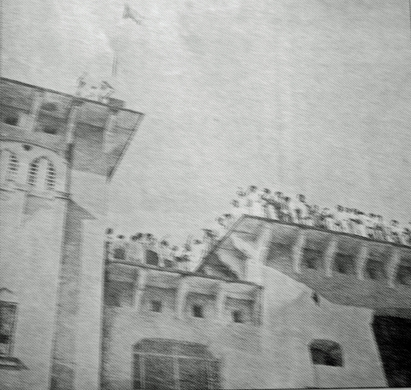
Dhaka University, the first university in Bangladesh

The education system that Bangladesh inherited after independence needed immediate intervention to suit the need of a new country. The first Education Commission in Bangladesh appointed under Dr. Qudrat-i-Khuda submitted its report in 1974. The report recommended secular education across levels, future work-relevant technical and vocational education, improved assessment system, letter grading in the assessment of student performance and making primary education from grade 1 to 8 and secondary from grade 9 to 12.

The primary education system in this decade was barely adequate to address the need of the nation. As of 1970, almost 4.77 million primary-school-age children were not enrolled in either primary or secondary schools; and even for those in school, there were only 1.71 teachers per 1,000 students. By 1977–78, the number of out-of-school children dropped to 3.14 million and primary school teachers per 1,000 student ratio improved to 2.39.

Based on World Bank data, in 1973, there were 2.27 million secondary school students (including higher secondary) in the country, which grew to 2.35 million by the end of the decade. However, Secondary school enrollment rate changed from 20.5% to 16.8% during the same period. Over these years ratio of female students in secondary education also dropped from 25.1% to 20.2%. On the brighter side, number of teachers covering the students grew from 94 to 105 thousand.

Before independence the secondary and higher secondary education administration for East Pakistan, used to be managed by 4 general education boards set-up in the 1960s, namely Dhaka, Rajshahi, Comilla and Jessore, and a Technical Education Board. After independence these boards were retained. However, religious education, which historically was managed by community based madrasas was brought under Government supervision. Steps were taken for the modernization of madrasah education. Bengali, mathematics, English, social science, general science were made compulsory. In 1978 the Madrasah Education Board was formed under Ordinance for the Modernization of Madrasah Education.

In the tertiary level newly independent Bangladesh started its journey with four general education universities, namely University of Dhaka, University of Rajshahi, University of Chittagong and newly opened Jahangirnagar University along with 2 specialized universities - Bangladesh University of Engineering & Technology in Dhaka and Bangladesh Agricultural University at Mymensingh. In addition, Institute of Postgraduate Medicine and Research (IPGMR) served as a Government-controlled postgraduate institute for medical research and studies. The University Grants Commission was established on 16 December 1972 as the apex body of all the affiliated universities of Bangladesh. On 22 November 1979, the foundation of the Islamic University was set up in Kushtia, but it began operations on 28 June 1986.

=== Mass media ===
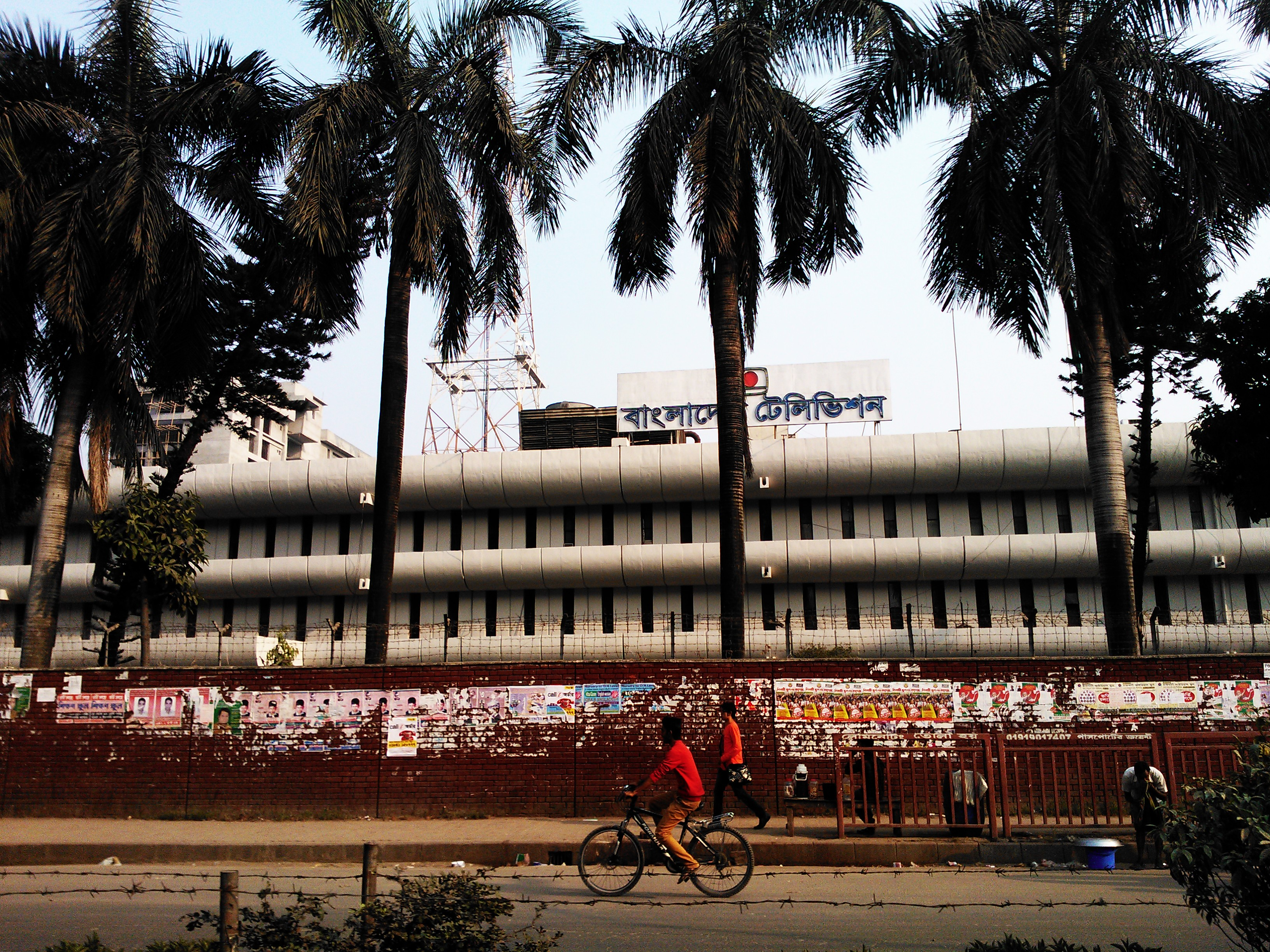
Bangladesh Television Head office moved to Rampura in 1975.

News agencies were present in Bangladesh prior to its independence from Pakistan in 1971. The state-owned Associated Press of Pakistan (AAP) had branches in Dhaka and Chittagong from 1949. After independence, the AAP was replaced by the Bangladesh state-owned agency Bangladesh Sangbad Sangstha on 1 January 1972. The second news agency to be established, and the first to be privately owned was Eastern News Agency (ENA). It was founded in Dhaka in the years immediately prior to the Bangladesh Liberation War. However, the freedom of press was significantly curbed quite early in the history of the country. One of the many restrictive regulations coming from the enactment of single party rule of BaKSAL was the promulgation of the Newspaper Ordinance (June 1975; Annulment of Declaration)- which allowed only four state owned newspapers (the Dainik Bangla, Bangladesh Observer, The Daily Ittefaq, and Bangladesh Times) to continue their publication and banned the rest of the press and newspaper industries. Later, After the assassination of Bangabandhu Sheikh Mujibur Rahman, many newspapers that were banned earlier started to reappear. Press Institute of Bangladesh and Bangladesh Press Council were established.

Government control was absolute in broadcast media landscape as well. The erstwhile autonomous East Pakistan station of Pakistan Television was brought under Government control after independence of Bangladesh, and started its refreshed journey as Bangladesh Television from 15 September 1972. Till the end of the decade BTV operated as the sole television transmission station in the country and aired its programmes in black and white format only. In 1975, the offices of the TV station were moved from the initial location of DIT Bhaban (present Rajuk Bhaban) to its new home at Rampura, Dhaka.

Radio played an important role during the Bangladesh Liberation War of 1971. On 26 March 1971, the broadcasting centre of Radio Pakistan was used to transmit a declaration of independence, which was picked up by a Japanese ship in Chittagong Harbor and got retransmitted. During the war, the Pakistan Army took over the Radio Station in Dhaka and the Bangladeshis operated Swadhin Bangla Betar Kendra (Independent Bengal Radio Station) clandestinely. Because of heavy shelling, the station had to be relocated several times, and ultimately moved to Calcutta on 25 May, from where it would broadcast until the end of the war. On 6 December 1971 the station was renamed Bangladesh Betar. It continued to operate as the only state-owned radio station of the country. In 1975, after the coup d'état the station was renamed as Radio Bangladesh.

== Awards and recognition ==
- Tahrunessa Abdullah, A social worker who championed the role of women in improving their families' livelihoods, was awarded Ramon Magsaysay Award in 1978.
- Ekushey Padak was introduced in the year 1976. 9 individuals were awarded in recognition of their contribution to different fields the first year of the award:
1. Kazi Nazrul Islam (Literature)
2. Muhammad Qudrat-i-Khuda (Education)
3. Jasimuddin (literature)
4. Sufia Kamal (literature)
5. Abdul Quadir (literature)
6. Muhammed Mansooruddin (education)
7. Tofazzal Hossain Manik Miah (journalism)
8. Abul Kalam Shamsuddin (literature)
9. Abdus Salam (Editor) (journalism)
- In 1977 the Government introduced Independence day award and 10 individuals were awarded in the inaugural year:
1. Maulana Abdul Hamid Khan Bhashani (social work)
2. Kazi Nazrul Islam (literature)
3. Mokarram Hussain Khundker (science and technology)
4. Zainul Abedin (arts)
5. Mahbub Alam Chashi (rural development)
6. Brig. Mahmudur Rahman Choudhury (medical science)
7. Dr. Md. Zafrullah Chowdhury (population control)
8. Runa Laila (music)
9. Habildar Mostak Ahmad (sports); and
10. Enayet Karim (welfare)

== Culture ==
=== Literature ===
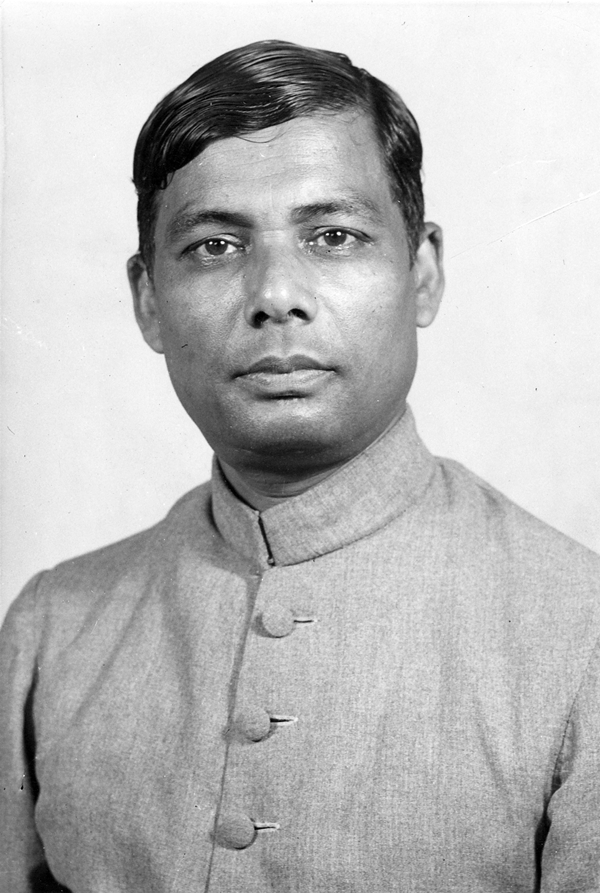
Jasimuddin (1903-1976)

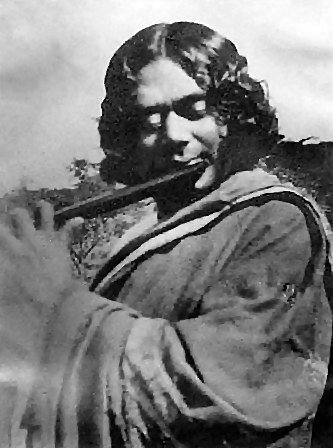
Kazi Nazrul Islam (1899-1976)

The literary works of the 1970s had strong influence of Bangladesh Liberation war on them. Notable literary works from Bangladeshi authors from this decade include Shawkat Osman's Jahannam Haite Biday, Dui Sainik, Nekde Aranya, Jalamgi and Janma Yadi Taba Bange; Selina Hossain's Hangor Nodi Grenade, Jalochchhvas and Magnachaitanye Shis; Humayun Ahmed's debut novel Nandita Narake and Shankhanil Karagar; Bashir Al Helal's Pratham Krishnachuda and Kalo Ilish; Rahat Khan's Anishchita Lokalay and Antahin Yatra; Anwar Pasha's autobiographical Rifle Roti Aorat; Syed Shamsul Huq's novel Khelaram Khele Ya and poetic play Payer Awaz Pawa Jay; Hasan Azizul Huq's Jiban Gase Agun and Namhin Gotrahin; Alauddin Al-Azad's Amar Rakta and Svapna Amar; Akhtaruzzaman Elias' Anya Ghare Anya Svar and Mamunur Rashid's Ora Kadam Ali. In this decade the literature circle of the country lost luminaries like: novelist Zahir Raihan (1972), author Syed Mujtaba Ali (1974), poet Jasim Uddin and the national poet Kazi Nazrul Islam (1976), writer Ibrahim Khan and Abul Kalam Shamsuddin (1978) and poet Bande Ali Mia (1979).

=== Visual arts ===
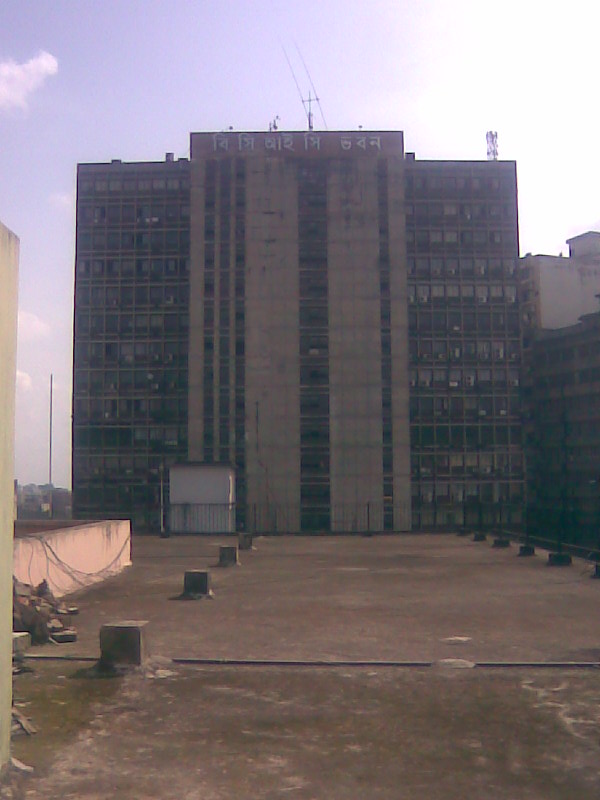
BCIC building (Completed 1976)

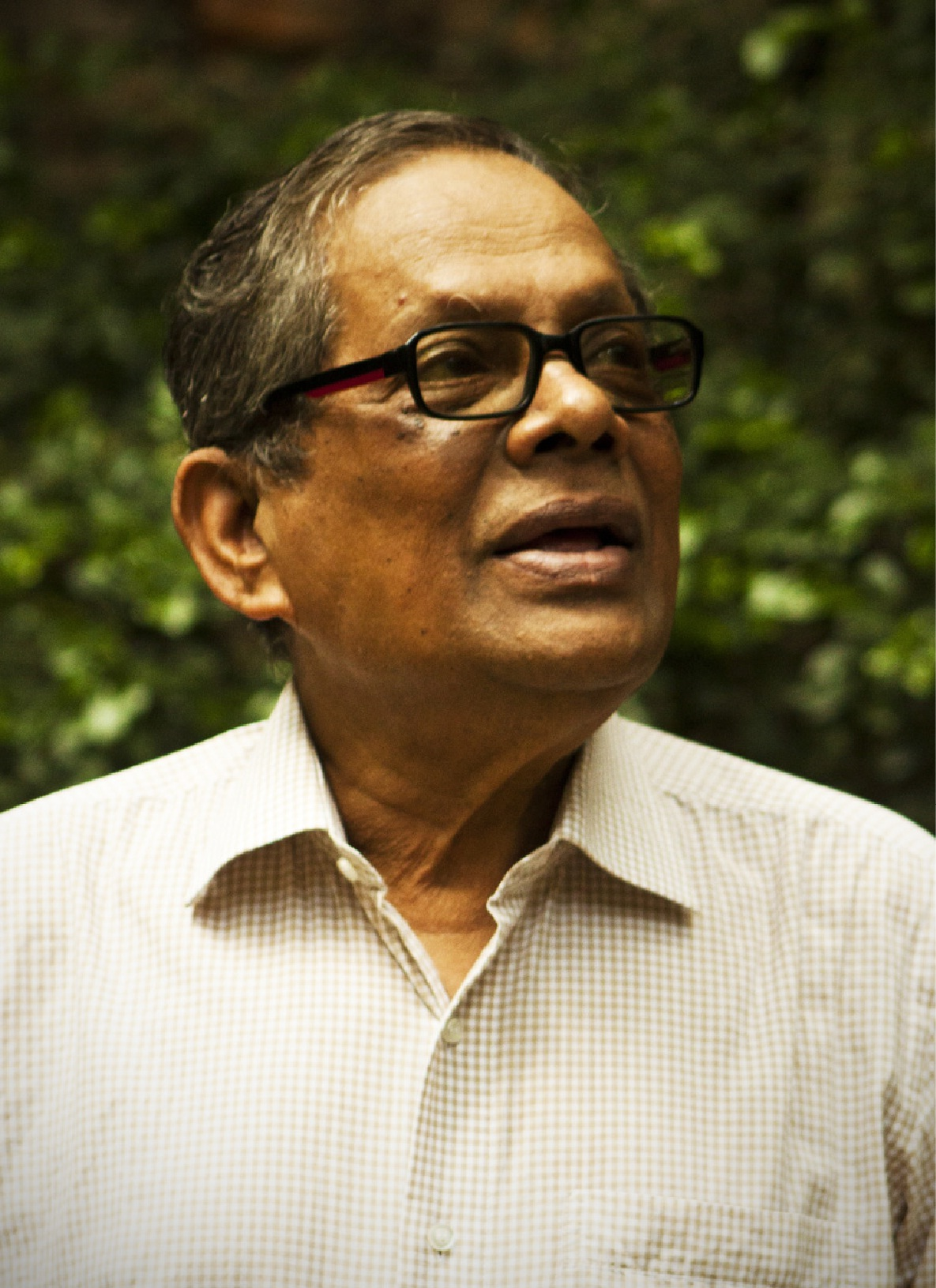
Architect Bashirul Haq

After the independence a few pioneers helped set the tone of fine arts for Bangladesh. In the field of photography – Manzoor Alam Beg and Anwar Hossain made their marks. The field of painting was particularly vibrant with painters Quamrul Hassan, SM Sultan and Monirul Islam actively contributing and new artists like Monsur Ul Karim and Shahabuddin Ahmed coming up. Sultan did some of his best work in the 1970s. In 1976 the Bangladesh Shilpakala Academy put on an individual exhibition of his work. It was his first major exhibition and his first in Dhaka. The next year he was selected as a member of the panel of judges for the Asian Art Biennale in Dhaka. However, in this decade the death of master painter Zainul Abedin (1976) made the nation grieve. Bangladeshi Architect Fazlur Rahman Khan also was performing at his peak in this decade, although most of his creations were outside Bangladesh. In 1977, architect Bashirul Haq won the national design competition for the Bangladesh Chemical Industries Corporation (BCIC) headquarters in Dhaka. Shilpakala Academy, the national academy of fine and performing arts, was established through an act of Parliament in 1974 as a statutory organization under the Ministry of Cultural Affairs.

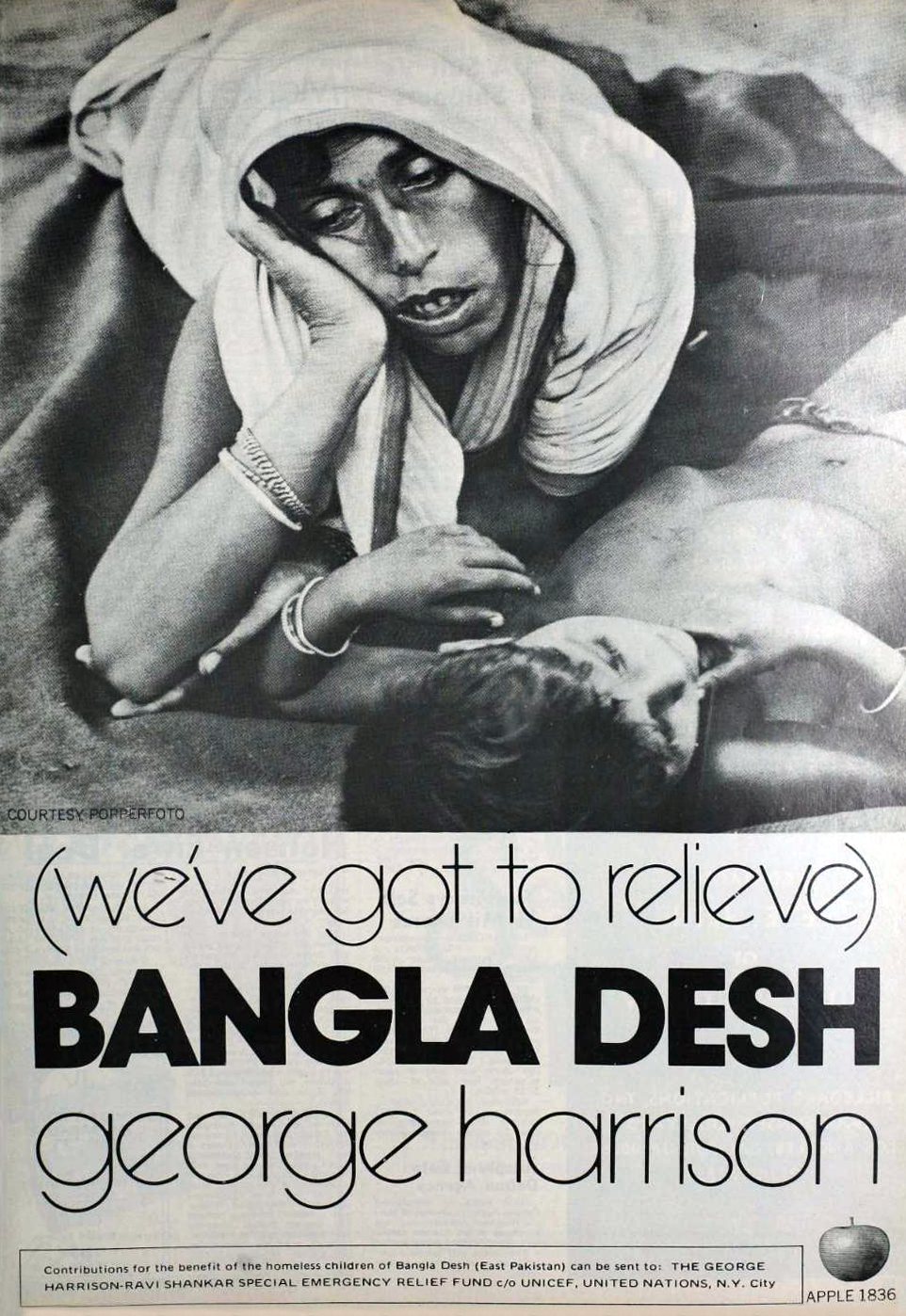
Trade ad for Harrison's "Bangla Desh" single, August 1971

=== Performing arts ===
Music played an important role in the Bangladesh Liberation war. Music directors and composers Samar Das, Ajit Roy and Shujeo Shyam along with singers and musicians like Apel Mahmud, Amitava Sengupta, Manjula Dasgupta, Abdul Jabbar, Mala Khan, Rupa Khan, Rafiqul Alam, Kaderi Kibria, Lucky Akhand, Jahangir Hayat Khan, Mihir Kumar Nandi, Timir Nandi, Fakir Alamgir and Dalia Nausheen played instrumental role in Swadhin Bangla Betar Kendra in inspiring the freedom fighters and the nation. A pair of benefit concerts organised by former Beatles guitarist George Harrison and Indian sitar player Ravi Shankar named "The Concert for Bangladesh" were held on Sunday, 1 August 1971, at Madison Square Garden in New York City, to raise international awareness of, and fund relief for refugees from East Pakistan, following the Bangladesh Liberation War-related genocide. The concerts were followed by a bestselling live album, a boxed three-record set, and Apple Films' concert documentary, which opened in cinemas in the spring of 1972.

After the independence, music directors and composers like Debu Bhattacherjee, Lokman Hossain Fakir, Azad Rahman and Alauddin Ali and singers like Ferdausi Rahman, Abdul Alim, Firoza Begum, Sabina Yasmin, Runa Laila and Mahmudun Nabi led the music arena with modern Bengali music and playback music of films. The untimely death of folk singer Abdul Alim in 1974 was shocking to the nation. The first band of the independent Bangladesh are the Underground Peace Lover (UPL), formed in 1972 in Dhaka. Uccharon were the biggest band of that era; and their frontman Azam Khan, a freedom fighter, cemented himself as a pop culture phenomenon. On the other hand, Spondan featuring musicians like Nasir Ahmed Apu, Firoz Shai, Ferdous Wahid, reinvented Bangla folk music and became one of the most popular rock bands during the 1970s. The Akhand Brothers Band (featuring Lucky and Happy Akhand), who produced several hit songs in that decade, is often credited as the first pop rock band of the country.

Theatre was possibly the most forceful and exuberant expression of post-liberation Bangladesh. Numerous non-professional theatre groups were formed all over the country, modelled after the group theatre movement in post-Nabanna Calcutta. The most important among these in Dhaka city were Theatre (established February 1972), Nagarik Natya Sampraday (established 1968, first performance August 1972), Natyachakra (established August 1972), Aranyak Natyadal (established 1972), Dhaka Theatre (established July 1973) and, in Chittagong, Theatre '73 (established 1973), Tirjak Nattyagoshthi (Established May 1974) and Arindam (established September 1974). The range of texts performed by the groups varied widely, from Euro-American plays to contemporary originals written by group members themselves. A completely new set of playwrights appeared, important among whom were Abdullah al Mamun, Mamunur Rashid, Syed Shamsul Huq, Selim Al Deen and Momtazuddin Ahmed.

=== Cinema ===
A total of 41 films were released in 1970, including Shorolipi by Nazrul Islam, Taka Ana Paay and the Jibon Theke Neya by Zahir Raihan. Jibon Theke Neya, considered a milestone film in the history of Bengali cinema, was a political satire based on the Bengali language movement under the rule of Pakistan. It stars Shaukat Akbar, Anwar Hossain, Khan Ataur Rahman, Rawshan Jamil, Abdur Razzak, Kohinoor Akhter Shuchanda, Amjad Hossain and Rosy Samad. The film has been described as an example of "national cinema", using discrete local traditions to build a representation of the Bangladeshi national identity. Other significant works of 1970 were Mishor Kumari of Karigir, Tansen of Rafiqul Bari, Bindu Theke Britto of Rebeka, Binimoy of Subhash Dutta, Kothay Jeno Dekhechi of Nizamul Hoque.

Only 6 Bengali films and two Urdu films made in East Bengal were released in 1971 before the Bangladesh Liberation War. Some notable social drama films include Nacher Putul by Ashok Ghosh, Sritituku Thak by Alamgir Kumkum, and Shukh Dukkho by Khan Ataur Rahman. Following the outbreak of the Bangladesh Liberation War, Raihan made the documentary Stop Genocide to draw attention to the plight of the people of East Bengal. It was one of the first internationally acclaimed films of Bangladesh. In December 1971, the East Pakistan Film Development Corporation changed its name to the Bangladesh Film Development Corporation, which had the only major film studio and colour lab of the Bangladeshi film industry until the 2010s. Most Bangladeshi films were produced from this studio. Production quantity continued to increase after Bangladesh gained its independence; by the 1990s, over 90 films per year were released. At that time, the film department was under the leadership of Abdul Jabbar Khan. The Bangladeshi film industry was successful both critically and commercially through the first half of the 1990s.

Many Bangladeshi movies of the 1970s were about the war. The first full-length feature film of independent Bangladesh was Ora Egaro Jon released in 1972. The movie was directed by Chashi Nazrul Islam. Other filmmakers who made critically acclaimed war films in the 1970s include Alamgir Kabir, Chashi Nazrul Islam, and Subhash Dutta. Three of Kabir's feature films are featured in the "Top 10 Bangladeshi Films" critics' choice list by the British Film Institute. His films include Dhire Bohe Meghna (1973), Shurjo Konya (1976), Shimana Periye (1977), Rupali Shoykte (1979), Mohona (1982), Porinita (1984) and Mohanayok (1985). Other notable directors in the 1970s include Narayan Ghosh Mita, Abdullah al Mamun, Johirul Haque, and Amjad Hossain. Haque's Rongbaaj was one of the first commercial action films of Bangladesh.

After independence, one of the first international acclaimed film was A River Called Titas released in 1973, directed by prominent Indian Bengali director Ritwik Ghatak and starring Prabir Mitra in the lead role. Titash Ekti Nadir Naam topped the list of 10 best Bangladeshi films in the audience and critics' polls conducted by the British Film Institute in 2002. Some other notable films of 1970s include Joy Bangla (1972) of Fakrul Alom; Lalon Fokir (1972) of Syed Hasan Imam; Obhuj Mon (1972) of Kazi Jhohir; Shongram (1974) by Chashi Nazrul Islam, Arunodoyer Agnishakkhi (1972), Bashundhara (1977) by Subhash Dutta; Alor Michil (1974), Lathial (1975) by Narayan Ghosh Mita; Megher Onek Rong (1976) by Harunur Rashid; Golapi Ekhon Traine (1978) by Amjad Hossain; Sareng Bou (1978) by Abdullah al Mamun; Oshikkhito (1978) by Azizur Rahman; The Father (1979) by Kazi Hayat, and Surjo Dighal Bari (1979) by Sheikh Niamat Ali and Moshiuddin Shaker. Surjo Dighal Bari was a critically acclaimed movie and it re-introduced Bangladeshi films to the international audience. The movie was based on a novel of the same name by Abu Ishaque. In 1975, the government started a national film award, as well as a donation fund for creative films.

=== Television ===
Bangladesh Television was the only television network available to the people of Bangladesh throughout the 1970s. The transmission was in black and white, and penetration of television across the country was low. There was also no support for live telecast, so only recorded programs were played. Abdullah al Mamun (playwright), Mamunur Rashid, Jamil Chowdhury and Mustafa Monwar were among the leading television producers who shaped the programmes of Bangladesh Television during Bangladesh Liberation War and later. Fazle Lohani created a new magazine show named Jodi Kichhu Mone Na Koren in 1977, which was based on The David Frost Show on BBC. The show gained wide popularity.

=== Sports ===
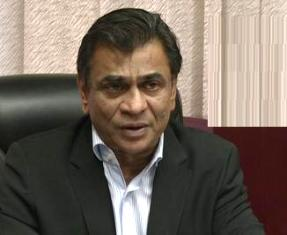
Kazi Salahuddin was a leading performer of Bangladeshi football in the 1970s.

During the liberation war in 1971, sports, particularly football, was used as a vehicle to create international awareness about the war of independence. With this goal, the Swadhin Bangla Football Team was established - which played 16 matches in India. Zakaria Pintoo, who was the captain of that team and the first person to wave Bangladesh's flag in foreign land. Immediately after independence, Bangladesh started to organize the sporting sector. BFF and BCB were founded in 1972. In this decade the most popular sport in the country was football with a vibrant domestic scene. Bangladesh played its first international football match against Thailand in 1973. The BFF became affiliated with the AFC in 1973, and FIFA in 1976, and later hosted the 1978 AFC Youth Championship. Other sports that gained popularity were hockey and athletics. Bangladesh sports showed courage and determination in the 1970s.

== See also ==
Years in Bangladesh in the decade of

1970s
1971
1972
1973
1974
1975
1976
1977
1978
1979
