= 1974 in Bangladesh =

- Centuries: 20th; 21st
- Decades: 1950s; 1960s; 1970s; 1980s; 1990s
- See also: Other events of 1974; List of years in Bangladesh

1974 (MCMLXXIV) was a common year starting on Tuesday of the Gregorian calendar, the 1974th year of the Common Era (CE) and Anno Domini (AD) designations, the 974th year of the 2nd millennium, the 74th year of the 20th century, and the 5th year of the 1970s decade.

The year 1974 was the third year after the independence of Bangladesh. It was also the third year of the first post-independence government in Bangladesh. The year saw a period of mass starvation beginning in March 1974 and ending in about December of the same year. The famine, allegedly causing death of a million people, is considered the worst in recent decades.

== Incumbents ==
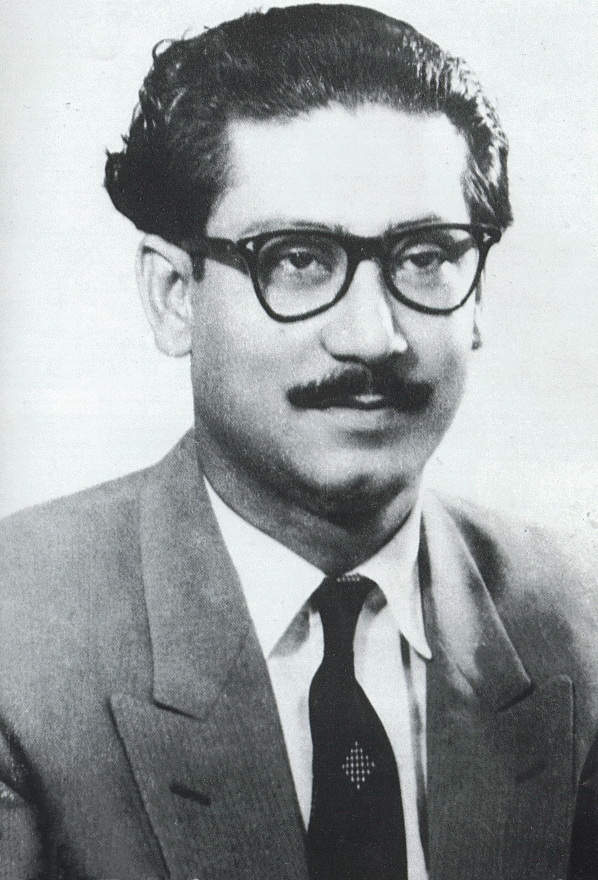
Mujibur
Rahman

- President: Mohammad Mohammadullah
- Prime Minister: Sheikh Mujibur Rahman
- Chief Justice: Abu Sadat Mohammad Sayem

== Demography ==
Demographic Indicators for Bangladesh in 1974
Population, total	68,742,222
Population density (per km^{2})	528.1
Population growth (annual %)	1.6%
Male to Female Ratio (every 100 Female)	106.6
Urban population (% of total)	9.0%
Birth rate, crude (per 1,000 people)	45.7
Death rate, crude (per 1,000 people)	18.7
Mortality rate, under 5 (per 1,000 live births)	219
Life expectancy at birth, total (years)	47.4
Fertility rate, total (births per woman)	6.9

== Climate ==
Climate data for Bangladesh in 1974
Month	Jan	Feb	Mar	Apr	May	Jun	Jul	Aug	Sep	Oct	Nov	Dec	Year
Daily mean °C (°F)	17.7 (63.9)	20.2 (68.4)	24.4 (75.9)	27.1 (80.8)	27.6 (81.7)	27.9 (82.2)	27.1 (80.8)	27.9 (82.2)	27.5 (81.5)	27.6 (81.7)	24.1 (75.4)	18.3 (64.9)	24.8 (76.6)
Average precipitation mm (inches)	5.7 (0.22)	0 (0)	122.8 (4.83)	154.5 (6.08)	326.4 (12.85)	423.5 (16.67)	728. (28.7)	375. (14.8)	340.9 (13.42)	238.6 (9.39)	19.3 (0.76)	1.5 (0.06)	2,736.1 (107.72)
Source: Climatic Research Unit (CRU) of University of East Anglia (UEA)

== Economy ==
Key Economic Indicators for Bangladesh in 1974
National Income
	Current US$	Current BDT	% of GDP
GDP	$12.5 billion	BDT99.7 billion	
GDP growth (annual %)	9.6%		
GDP per capita	$182.0	BDT1,450	
Agriculture, value added	$7.1 billion	BDT56.5 billion	56.6%
Industry, value added	$1.7 billion	BDT13.3 billion	13.4%
Services, etc., value added	$3.8 billion	BDT29.9 billion	30.0%

Note: For the year 1974 average official exchange rate for BDT was 8.23 per US$.

== Events ==
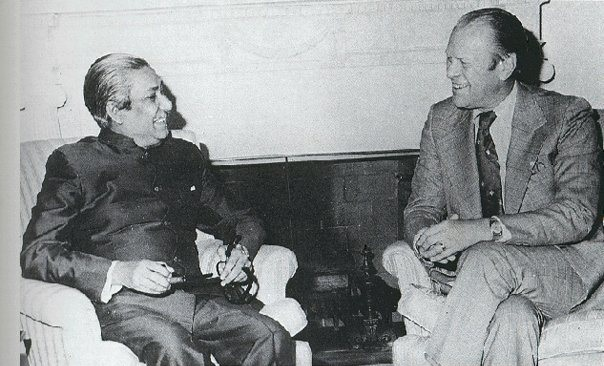
Mujib as Prime Minister of Bangladesh with U.S. President Gerald Ford in 1974

- 22 February – Pakistan recognizes Bangladesh.
- 17 March – Members of Jatiya Rakkhi Bahini fired upon demonstrators from the Jatiyo Samajtantarik Dal, who were blockading the residence of the home minister, Mansur Ali, located in the Ramna area of Dhaka. The incident reportedly claimed at least fifty lives.
- 9 April – A tripartite agreement is signed among Bangladesh, India and Pakistan regarding post-war humanitarian issues.
- 16 May – A land boundary agreement was signed between Indira Gandhi and Sheikh Mujibur Rahman which provided for the exchange of enclaves and the surrender of adverse possessions.
- 17 September – Bangladesh joins the United Nations.
- 25 September – Sheikh Mujibur Rahman addresses the UN General Assembly in Bengali.
- 28 November – Third Amendment to the Constitution of Bangladesh was passed bringing changes in Article 2 of the constitution. An agreement was made between Bangladesh and India in respect of exchange of certain enclaves and fixation of boundary lines between the countries.
- 28 December – In the face of growing unrest, Prime Minister Sheikh Mujibur Rahman declares a state of emergency.

=== Sports ===
- Domestic football:
  - Abahani Krira Chakra won the Dhaka First Division Football League title, while Dilkusha SC came out runners-up.
  - Brothers Union won the Dhaka Second Division Football League title, earning promotion to the First Division.
  - Shantinagar Club won the Dhaka Third Division Football League, earning promotion to the Second Division.
  - Rahmatganj MFS participated in the Bordoloi Trophy.
  - Abahani Krira Chakra became the first club after the independence of Bangladesh to participate in the IFA Shield.

== Births ==
- Ziaur Rahman, chess player
- Reefat Bin-Sattar, chess player
- Chanchal Chowdhury, actor
- Rajeeb Samdani, industrialist
- Tanzir Tuhin, musician
- Bobby Hajjaj, politician
- Bimal Tarafdar, sprinter

== Deaths ==
- 11 February – Syed Mujtaba Ali, writer (b. 1904)
- 13 May – Khuda Buksh, humanitarian (b. 1912)
- 12 June – M. A. Hannan, politician (b. 1930)
- 5 October – Abul Hashim, politician (b. 1905)
- 2 November – Mohammad Barkatullah, writer (b. 1898)
- 5 November – Barada Bhushan Chakraborty, revolutionary peasant leader (b. 1901)

== See also ==
- 1970s in Bangladesh
- List of Bangladeshi films of 1974
- Timeline of Bangladeshi history
