= List of Bangladeshi films of 1976 =

A list of Bangladesh films released in 1976.

== Releases ==
Title	Director	Cast	Genre	Release date	Notes	Ref.
Protinidhi	Azim	Razzak, Sujata, Hasan Imam, Maya Hazari		16 January		
Ek Mutho Bhat	Ibne Mizan	Babita, Fatahah Lohani, Jashim, Hasmot		30 January		
Mon Jara Chai	Akko	Olia, Azim, Adib & Tarjan Shahida, Parul		5 April		
Joy Porajoy	Mostafa Mehmud	Alamgir, Shabana, Kolpona, Probir Mitra		9 April		
Kajal Rekha	Safder Ali Bhuiyan	Javed, Kalpana, Jasim, Raj		18 June		
Noyonmoni	Amjad Hossain	Bobita, Farooque		25 June		
Gunda	Alamgir Kumkum	Razzak, Kobari		23 July		
Dassu Bonhur	Sarothi	Sohel Rana, Anjona, Kolpona, Kholil, Raj		30 July		
Surjo Konna	Alamgir Kabir	Bulbul Ahmed, Jayasree Kabir, Rajashree Bose, Ahsan Ali, Sumita Devi, Ajoy Banerjee, Maya Hazarika, Ajit Banerjee				
Surjo Grahan	Abdus Samad	Bobita, Chetana Das, Farooq, Zafar Iqbal, Rosy Samad				
Suprovat	Kabir Anwar	Kamal Banerjee, Ranu, Rini Reza	Drama			
Megher Onek Rong	Harunur Rashid	Rowshon Ara		12 November		
Ki Je Kori	Zahirul Haq	Razzak, Bobita				
The Rain	S. M. Shafi	Olivia, Wasim, Syed Hasan Imam	Romance	26 November		
Agun	Mohsin					
Aj-O Bhulini	Neyaz Iqbal					
Akangkha	Subhash Dutta					
Alor Pathey	Sammyasathi Choudhury					
Anurodh	Dilip Biswas					
Avishap	Rashed Ashgar Choudhury					
Bahadur	Ibne Mizan					
Bandini	Mushtaq					
Bargi Elo Deshey	Mustafiz					
Chalo Ghar Bandhi	Nur-ul Alam					
Ferari	Mostafa Anwar					
Garmil	Azizur Rahman					
Gopan Katha	Azad Rahman					
Jal Thekey Jwala	Mohsin					
Jaliat	H. Akbar					
Janoar	Kalidas					
Jibon Maran	Azim					
Jibon Sathi	Nurul Haq					
Matir Maya	Taher Choudhury					
Mayar Badhan	Mustafiz					
Monihar	Mostafa Mehmud					
Rakter Daak	H. Akbar					
Rang Berang	Ruhul Amin					
Samadhi	Dilip Biswas					
Sandhikhan	Mir Mohammad Halim					
Seyana	Fakrul Hasan					
Shapmukti	Azizur Rahman					
Shetu	Babul Choudhury					
Smuggler	Azhar / Sheikh Ataur Rahman					
Tal Betal	Azizur Rahman					
Tarzan of Bengal	Majid Bongobasi					

== See also ==
- 1976 in Bangladesh
- List of Bangladeshi films of 1977
- List of Bangladeshi films
- Cinema of Bangladesh
