= 1976 in Bangladesh =

- Centuries: 20th; 21st
- Decades: 1950s; 1960s; 1970s; 1980s; 1990s
- See also: Other events of 1976; List of years in Bangladesh

1976 (MCMLXXVI) was a leap year starting on Thursday of the Gregorian calendar, the 1976th year of the Common Era (CE) and Anno Domini (AD) designations, the 976th year of the 2nd millennium, the 76th year of the 20th century, and the 7th year of the 1970s decade.

The year 1976 was the 5th year after the independence of Bangladesh. It was also the year when Gen Ziaur Rahman consolidated his power and proceeded to become the President.

== Incumbents ==
- President: Abu Sadat Mohammad Sayem
- Chief Justice: Syed A. B. Mahmud Hossain

== Demography ==
Demographic Indicators for Bangladesh in 1976
Population, total	71,652,386
Population density (per km^{2})	550.5
Population growth (annual %)	2.2%
Male to Female Ratio (every 100 Female)	106.4
Urban population (% of total)	10.7%
Birth rate, crude (per 1,000 people)	44.9
Death rate, crude (per 1,000 people)	17.1
Mortality rate, under 5 (per 1,000 live births)	214
Life expectancy at birth, total (years)	49.4
Fertility rate, total (births per woman)	6.8

== Climate ==
Climate data for Bangladesh in 1976
Month	Jan	Feb	Mar	Apr	May	Jun	Jul	Aug	Sep	Oct	Nov	Dec	Year
Daily mean °C (°F)	18.3 (64.9)	21.2 (70.2)	25.5 (77.9)	27.8 (82.0)	27.4 (81.3)	27.5 (81.5)	27.9 (82.2)	27.4 (81.3)	27.9 (82.2)	26.6 (79.9)	24.3 (75.7)	19. (66)	25.1 (77.2)
Average precipitation mm (inches)	.6 (0.02)	17.2 (0.68)	30.7 (1.21)	90.6 (3.57)	294.2 (11.58)	624. (24.6)	488.8 (19.24)	439.9 (17.32)	227.9 (8.97)	99.3 (3.91)	45.1 (1.78)	2. (0.1)	2,360.2 (92.92)
Source: Climatic Research Unit (CRU) of University of East Anglia (UEA)

== Economy ==
Key Economic Indicators for Bangladesh in 1976
National Income
	Current US$	Current BDT	% of GDP
GDP	$10.1 billion	BDT150.2 billion	
GDP growth (annual %)	5.7%		
GDP per capita	$141.2	BDT2,097	
Agriculture, value added	$5.3 billion	BDT78.0 billion	51.9%
Industry, value added	$1.5 billion	BDT21.7 billion	14.4%
Services, etc., value added	$3.4 billion	BDT50.5 billion	33.6%
Balance of Payment
	Current US$	Current BDT	% of GDP
Current account balance	-$276.3 million		-2.7%
Imports of goods and services	$947.9 million	BDT26.5 billion	17.6%
Exports of goods and services	$467.3 million	BDT7.1 billion	4.7%
Foreign direct investment, net inflows	$5.4 million		0.1%
Personal remittances, received	$18.8 million		0.2%
Total reserves (includes gold) at year end	$288.9 million		
Total reserves in months of imports	3.5		

Note: For the year 1976 average official exchange rate for BDT was 15.40 per US$.

== Events ==
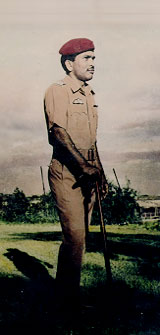
Abu
Taher

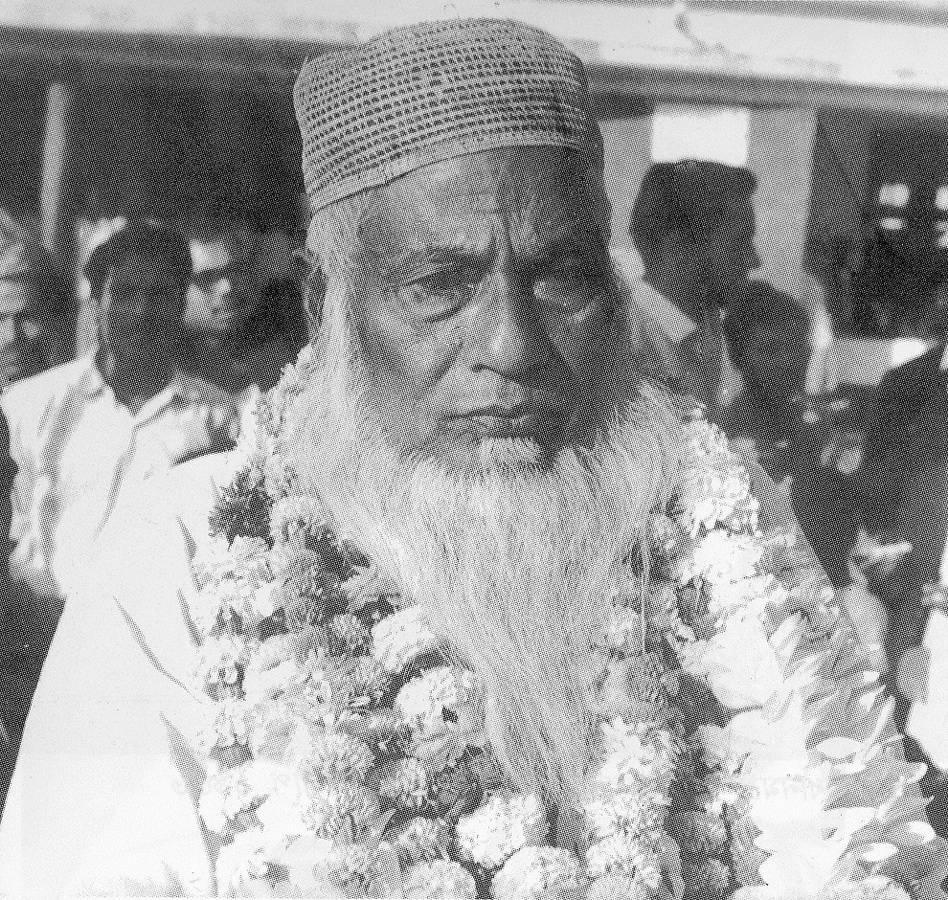
Maulana
Bhasani

- 16 May - Farakka Long March was led by Maulana Abdul Hamid Khan Bhashani, demanded demolition of the Farakka Barrage constructed by India to divert flow of Ganges waters inside its territory, triggering the drying up of river Padma and desertification of Bangladesh.
- 21 July - Col. Abu Taher was tried by a military tribunal inside the Dhaka Central Jail and sentenced to death. The trial was later considered flawed.
- Five years after the secession of East Pakistan, Pakistan has Diplomatic Relations with Bangladesh.
- 19 November - General Zia took over the powers of Chief Martial Law Administrator, leaving President Sayem with only ceremonial function.

=== Awards and recognitions ===
In the year 1976, the first year of the award, 9 individuals were awarded Ekushey Padak in recognition of their contribution to different fields:

1. Kazi Nazrul Islam (Literature)
2. Muhammad Qudrat-i-Khuda (Education)
3. Jasimuddin (literature)
4. Sufia Kamal (literature)
5. Abdul Quadir (literature)
6. Muhammed Mansooruddin (education)
7. Tofazzal Hossain Manik Miah (journalism)
8. Abul Kalam Shamsuddin (literature)
9. Abdus Salam (Editor) (journalism)

=== Sports ===
- Domestic football: Mohammedan SC won 1976 Dhaka First Division League title, while Abahani KC came out runners-up.
- Marylebone Cricket Club visited Bangladesh

== Births ==
- Amitabh Reza Chowdhury, filmmaker
- Sadia Islam Mou, model and actor

== Deaths ==
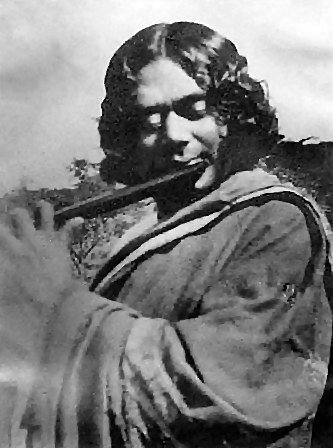
Kazi Nazrul Islam

- 13 March: Poet Jasim Uddin (b. 1903)
- 28 May: Zainul Abedin, painter (b. 1914)
- 21 July: Col. Abu Taher, Bir Uttom. (b. 1938)
- 29 August: Kazi Nazrul Islam, the national poet. (b. 1899)
- 9 September: Abdul Hye Choudhury, lawyer. (b. 1923)
- 17 November: Abdul Hamid Khan Bhashani, politician (b. 1880)
- 21 November: Ava Alam, classical singer (b. 1947)

== See also ==
- 1970s in Bangladesh
- List of Bangladeshi films of 1976
- Timeline of Bangladeshi history
