= 1973 in Bangladesh =

- Centuries: 20th; 21st
- Decades: 1950s; 1960s; 1970s; 1980s; 1990s
- See also: Other events of 1973; List of years in Bangladesh

1973 (MCMLXXIII) was a common year starting on Monday of the Gregorian calendar, the 1973rd year of the Common Era (CE) and Anno Domini (AD) designations, the 973rd year of the 2nd millennium, the 73rd year of the 20th century, and the 4th year of the 1970s decade.

The year 1973 was the second year after the independence of Bangladesh. It was also the second year of the first post-independence government in Bangladesh.

== Incumbents ==
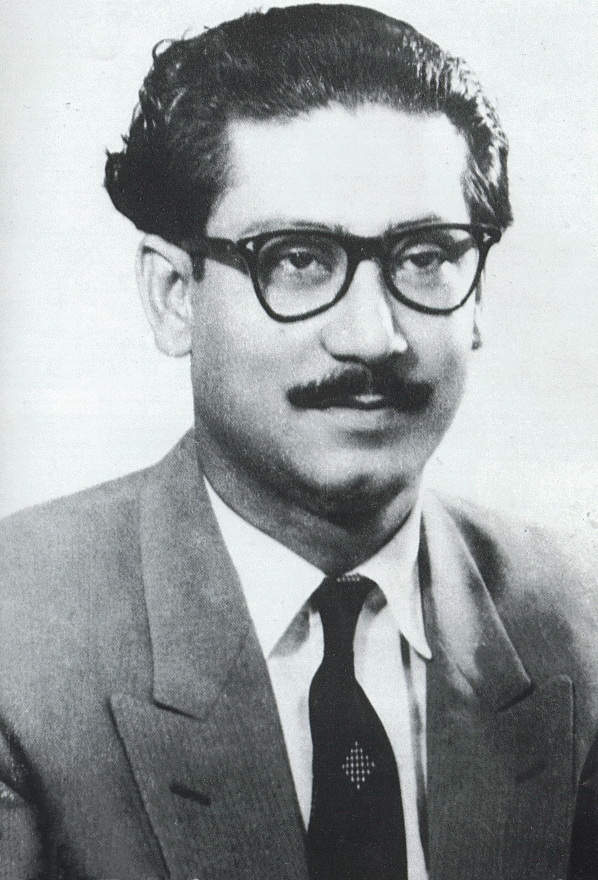
Mujibur
Rahman

- President: Abu Sayeed Chowdhury (until 24 December), Mohammad Mohammadullah (starting 24 December)
- Prime Minister: Sheikh Mujibur Rahman
- Chief Justice: Abu Sadat Mohammad Sayem

== Demography ==
Demographic Indicators for Bangladesh in 1973
Population, total	67,637,541
Population density (per km^{2})	519.6
Population growth (annual %)	1.5%
Male to Female Ratio (every 100 Female)	106.7
Urban population (% of total)	8.6%
Birth rate, crude (per 1,000 people)	46.1
Death rate, crude (per 1,000 people)	19.1
Mortality rate, under 5 (per 1,000 live births)	220
Life expectancy at birth, total (years)	46.8
Fertility rate, total (births per woman)	6.9

== Climate ==
Climate data for Bangladesh in 1973
Month	Jan	Feb	Mar	Apr	May	Jun	Jul	Aug	Sep	Oct	Nov	Dec	Year
Daily mean °C (°F)	18.9 (66.0)	21.9 (71.4)	24.1 (75.4)	28.7 (83.7)	27.1 (80.8)	27.8 (82.0)	28.2 (82.8)	28. (82)	27.6 (81.7)	26.8 (80.2)	23. (73)	19. (66)	25.1 (77.2)
Average precipitation mm (inches)	4.9 (0.19)	36.6 (1.44)	50.8 (2.00)	107.7 (4.24)	463.8 (18.26)	514.2 (20.24)	432.6 (17.03)	292.2 (11.50)	406.2 (15.99)	164. (6.5)	100.4 (3.95)	45.3 (1.78)	2,618.7 (103.10)
Source: Climatic Research Unit (CRU) of University of East Anglia (UEA)

== Economy ==
Key Economic Indicators for Bangladesh in 1973
National Income
	Current US$	Current BDT	% of GDP
GDP	$8.1 billion	BDT62.9 billion	
GDP growth (annual %)	3.3%		
GDP per capita	$119.6	BDT930	
Agriculture, value added	$4.6 billion	BDT35.6 billion	56.6%
Industry, value added	$1.0 billion	BDT7.6 billion	12.1%
Services, etc., value added	$2.5 billion	BDT19.7 billion	31.3%

Note: For the year 1973 average official exchange rate for BDT was 7.85 per US$.

== Events ==
- 7 March: First general election of Bangladesh is held, Bangladesh Awami League secures majority.
- 17 April: a tornado in the Manikganj region had killed at least 681 people.
- 17 July: The first amendment was made to the constitution. The amendment inserted an additional clause, Article 47(3), that states that any law regarding prosecution or punishment of war crimes cannot be declared void or unlawful on grounds of unconstitutionality. A new Article 47A was also added, which specifies that certain fundamental rights will be inapplicable in those cases.
- 28 August: India, Pakistan and Bangladesh signed a trilateral agreement, termed the Delhi Agreement, allowing the repatriation of prisoners of war and interned officials held in the three countries after the 1971 Bangladesh Liberation War.
- 6 September: Bangladesh joins Non-Aligned Movement(NAM).
- 22 September: The second amendment of the constitution was passed, allowing the suspension of some fundamental rights of citizens during a state of emergency.
- 12 November: Bangladesh joined FAO.
- 15 December: Gallantry awards of the war declared in Bangladesh Gazette.
- Establishment of the National Library of Bangladesh.
- The Shanti Bahini (Peace Force) guerrillas, mostly members of the Chakma tribe, took up arms after Bangladesh rejected their demands for autonomy over 5,500 sq.-mile region bordering India and Burma. They also demanded the removal of more than 300,000 settlers from their tribal homeland.

=== Awards and recognitions ===
Seven freedom fighters killed in action during the Liberation War of 1971 were awarded Bir Sreshtho title on 15 December 1973:

- Engineroom Artificer Ruhul Amin
- Captain Mohiuddin Jahangir
- Sepoy Mostafa Kamal
- Sepoy Hamidur Rahman
- Flight Lieutenant Matiur Rahman
- Lance Naik Munshi Abdur Rouf
- Lance Naik Nur Mohammad Sheikh

=== Sports ===
- International football:
  - On 27 July, Bangladesh national football team made their international debut, in a 2–2 draw against Thailand at the 1973 Merdeka Tournament held in Malaysia. Enayetur Rahman Khan scored the country's first ever international goal.
  - On 13 August, Bangladesh national football team got their first ever victory by defeating Singapore 1–0, thanks to a goal from AKM Nowsheruzzaman.
- Domestic football:
  - BIDC won the Dhaka First Division Football League title, while Abahani Krira Chakra, Mohammedan SC and Dhaka Wanderers came out joint runners-up.
  - BRTC Sports Club won the Dhaka Second Division Football League title, earning promotion to the First Division.
  - Brothers Union won the Dhaka Third Division Football League, earning promotion to the Second Division.
  - In November, Dinamo Minsk from Soviet Union toured Dhaka, Jessore and Comilla, and played four exhibition matches between 5 and 14 November.

== Births ==
- S M Jahangir Hossain, politician
- Saidus Salehin Khaled, musician
- Arifa Parvin Moushumi, actor
- Tipu Sultan, journalist
- Alfaz Ahmed, soccer player
- Shakil Khan, actor

== Deaths ==
- 17 July - Fazlul Qadir Chaudhry, politician (b. 1919)
- 29 August - Syed Hedayetullah, academic and researcher (b. 1904)
- 22 December - Abdul Karim, soil scientist (b. 1922)

== See also ==
- 1970s in Bangladesh
- List of Bangladeshi films of 1973
- Timeline of Bangladeshi history
