= 1972 in Bangladesh =

- Centuries: 20th; 21st
- Decades: 1950s; 1960s; 1970s; 1980s; 1990s
- See also: Other events of 1972; List of years in Bangladesh

1972 (MCMLXXII) was a leap year starting on Saturday of the Gregorian calendar, the 1972nd year of the Common Era (CE) and Anno Domini (AD) designations, the 972nd year of the 2nd millennium, the 72nd year of the 20th century, and the 3rd year of the 1970s decade.

The year 1972 was the first year after the independence of Bangladesh. It was also the first year of the first post-independence government in Bangladesh.

== Incumbents ==
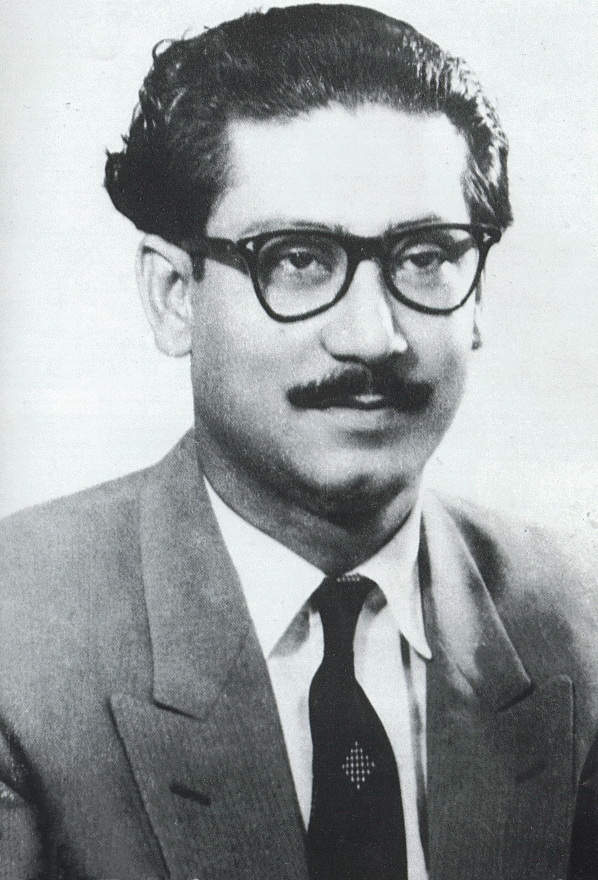
Mujibur
Rahman

- President: Sheikh Mujibur Rahman (until 12 January), Abu Sayeed Chowdhury (starting 12 January)
- Prime Minister: Tajuddin Ahmad (until 12 January), Sheikh Mujibur Rahman (starting 12 January)
- Vice President: Syed Nazrul Islam (until 12 January); vacant thereafter
- Chief Justice: Abu Sadat Mohammad Sayem

== Demography ==
Demographic Indicators for Bangladesh in 1972
Population, total	66,625,706
Population density (per km^{2})	511.8
Population growth (annual %)	1.7%
Male to Female Ratio (every 100 Female)	106.9
Urban population (% of total)	8.2%
Birth rate, crude (per 1,000 people)	46.5
Death rate, crude (per 1,000 people)	19.3
Mortality rate, under 5 (per 1,000 live births)	221
Life expectancy at birth, total (years)	46.5
Fertility rate, total (births per woman)	6.9

== Climate ==
Climate data for Bangladesh in 1972
Month	Jan	Feb	Mar	Apr	May	Jun	Jul	Aug	Sep	Oct	Nov	Dec	Year
Daily mean °C (°F)	18.7 (65.7)	18.7 (65.7)	25.1 (77.2)	27.4 (81.3)	29.3 (84.7)	28.3 (82.9)	28.3 (82.9)	27.5 (81.5)	28.1 (82.6)	26.7 (80.1)	23.2 (73.8)	19.5 (67.1)	25.1 (77.2)
Average precipitation mm (inches)	1.6 (0.06)	25.2 (0.99)	25.2 (0.99)	105.4 (4.15)	144.1 (5.67)	289.1 (11.38)	368. (14.5)	420.5 (16.56)	205. (8.1)	98.4 (3.87)	3.7 (0.15)	.4 (0.02)	1,686.7 (66.41)
Source: Climatic Research Unit (CRU) of University of East Anglia (UEA)

== Economy ==
Key Economic Indicators for Bangladesh in 1972
National Income
	Current US$	Current BDT	% of GDP
GDP	$6.3 billion	BDT37.7 billion	
GDP growth (annual %)	-14.0%		
GDP per capita	$94.4	BDT566	
Agriculture, value added	$3.7 billion	BDT22.5 billion	59.6%
Industry, value added	$.4 billion	BDT2.3 billion	6.1%
Services, etc., value added	$2.2 billion	BDT13.0 billion	34.3%

Note: For the year 1972 average official exchange rate for BDT was 7.70 per US$.

== Events ==
- 8 January – Sheikh Mujibur Rahman was released from the Mianwali jail and allowed to leave Pakistan after more than nine months' imprisonment. Two days later, after flying to London and Delhi, he returned to Dhaka to become the first President of Bangladesh.
- 10 January – Sheikh Mujibur Rahman, the "Bangabandhu" and "Father of Bangladesh", returned to Dhaka at 1:30 pm to a hero's welcome.
- 19 February – The 25-year Indo-Bangladeshi Treaty of Friendship, Cooperation and Peace is signed in Dhaka.
- 17 March – Indian prime minister Indira Gandhi visited prime minister Sheikh Mujibur Rahman on his birthday. Indian army leaves Dhaka.
- 19 March – The prime ministers of Bangladesh and India sign the Joint Rivers Commission.
- 26 March – Regulations passed allowing large scale nationalization of various industries including banks, manufacturing and trading enterprises.
- 4 April – The United States of America officially recognized Bangladesh.
- Smallpox outbreak in Khulna Municipality leads to 1384 cases and 372 deaths between 28 April and 22 June 1972.
- 4 June – A crowded passenger train from Khulna crashes into a stationary freight train at Jessore when the stationmaster throws the wrong switch; 76 people are killed and about 500 injured.
- 25 August – The first veto by China in the Security Council barred Bangladesh from membership in the United Nations.
- 4 November – Constitution of the People's Republic of Bangladesh is adopted by the Assembly.
- 16 December – Constitution of Bangladesh comes into effect.

=== Sports ===
- Domestic football:
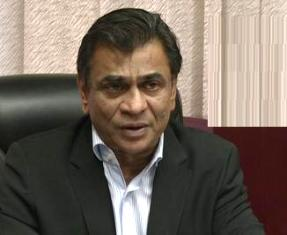
  - Kazi Salahuddin was an integral part of Bangladeshi football in 1972
    Bangladesh Football Federation was founded on 15 July.
  - On 13 February, a match between President XI and Bangladesh XI took place at the Dhaka Stadium in the presence of Bangabandhu Sheikh Mujibur Rahman, this was the first football match in independent Bangladesh. The President XI won the match 2–0, with goals from Golam Sarwar Tipu and Abdul Ghafoor.
  - Mohammedan SC won the first edition of the Independence Cup, while East End Club came out runners-up. This was the first football tournament arranged in the newly independent nation. Notably the tournament also included Nadia District XI, who thus became the first foreign football team to visit independent Bangladesh.
  - On 11 May 1972, India's Mohun Bagan AC (played as "Gostha Pal XI") was the first foreign football club to visit independent Bangladesh, took on Independence Cup champions Mohammedan SC. The Indian's won the game 1–0.
  - In August of that year, the Dhaka First Division League and Dhaka Second Division League were abandoned mid-season.
  - Abahani Krira Chakra was founded.
- International football:
  - On 13 May, Mohun Bagan AC faced "Dhaka XI", who were the unofficial Bangladesh national team (as Bangladesh were not yet an AFC or FIFA member), consisting of the best players in the country at the time. Dhaka XI striker Kazi Salahuddin scored the only of the game in front of more than 35,000 spectators at the Dhaka Stadium.
  - In August of that year, Dhaka XI travelled to India's Guwahati to take part in the Bordoloi Trophy. The team finished runners-up behind East Bengal Club.
  - On 4 and 11 November 1972, Dhaka XI played two exhibition matches against India's East Bengal Club both of which finished goalless at the Dhaka Stadium.
- Domestic cricket:
  - Bangladesh Cricket Control Board was founded.

== Births ==
- Al-Amin Hossain, cricketer
- Asif Akbar, singer
- Riaz Uddin Ahamed Siddique, actor
- Aminul Islam, trade unionist
- Avijit Roy, writer and blogger
- Mohamed Mahbub Alam, sprinter

== Deaths ==
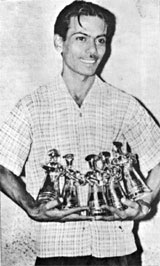
Zahir Raihan

- 30 January – Zahir Raihan, novelist, writer and filmmaker (b. 1935)
- 25 February – Syed Muhammed Taifoor, historian and writer (b. 1885)
- 6 April – Syed Nausher Ali, politician (b. 1891)
- 1 May – Shah Abdul Hamid, politician and legislator (b. 1900)
- 12 May – Kafiluddin Chowdhury, politician and legislator (b. 1898)
- 9 September – AKM Fazlul Kabir Chowdhury, politician and legislator
- 30 November – Mokarram Hussain Khundker, professor and researcher (b. 1922)

== See also ==
- 1970s in Bangladesh
- List of Bangladeshi films of 1972
