= Barada Bhushan Chakraborty =

- Born: 1901; Binyafair village, Tangail district, British India (present-day Bangladesh)
- Died: 5 November 1974 (aged 72–73); Calcutta, India
- Citizenship: British Subject (until 1947); Pakistan (until 1971); Bangladesh (from 1971)
- Organization: Anushilan Samiti
- Political party: Communist Party of India
- Movement: Indian independence movement Quit India Movement; Tebhaga movement Bengali language movement

Barada Bhushan Chakraborty (Bengali: বরদাভূষণ চক্রবর্তী;1901 – 5 November 1974) was a revolutionary communist peasant leader in Bangladesh.

== Early years and education ==
Barada was born in Binyafair village, in the Tangail district of what is now Bangladesh in 1901. His father was a priest, Haragopal Chakraborty and mother, an educated lady (up to middle school), Soudamini Devi. Barada Bhushan married Ashalata, younger by 11 years, in 1922.

He studied primary classes in his village school and then moved to North Bengal's Dinajpur town to study in a middle school, 'Dinajpur Academy'. After his entrance examination, he went to Calcutta, and graduated in arts from Vidyasagar College of Calcutta University; he received a post graduate degree from the Law College passing LLB. After obtaining the law degree he returned to Dinajpur and started practising in the Dinajpur Bar. (Subsequently, during his political detention for eight years (1930–1938), he passed his MA and also received the title, 'Pandit' after obtaining two degrees in Sanskrit scholastic, 'Rashtrabhasha Visharada' and 'Kavyatirtha' appearing for all the exams from jails.)

== Political activism during British rule ==
Barada Bhushan Chakrabarty was a front line freedom fighter and a member of Anushilan Samiti at Dinajpur (Now Bangladesh) He recruited Satyabrata Chakrabarty, Hrishikesh Bhattacharya, Saroj Kumar Basu in Anushilan Samiti. He or his family members were not involved with Hili Mail Dacoity Case which took place in year 1933. He was arrested as suspected in Hili Mail Dacoity Case. But police failed to collect any evidence of his involvement and did not submit charge sheet against him and was released. He spent several years in imprisonment as detenue and for his involvement of freedom movement. His wife Ashalata Chakrabarty was also directly involved in freedom movement and sent to jail.

During the Quit India Movement in 1942 he led Gandhi's movement in Dinajpur and was jailed for a year. Later he left Gandhi's path and joined the Communist Party of India (CPI) and remained a dedicated communist till his death.

In 1946 he, with others from the CPI, organised the most significant peasant movement of Bengal, the Tebhaga movement. He, Satyabrata Chakravorty, and Dinesh Das were in charge of the movement in Dinajpur town. Dinajpur district's movement was one of the fiercest, and many villagers were killed by the British. He was arrested on 4 January 1947, and was kept in jail till India was declared independent and Pakistan was born in 1947.

== Later activism ==
He continued to lead the Tebhaga movement in Pakistan after Independence. As a Hindu by birth, he was a soft target of the newly constituted Pakistan. In 1948 Pakistani government arrested him not as a leader of the peasant's unrest but as a security prisoner. After a year he was released but then taken into custody under the Special Powers Ordinance. This time he remained behind bars for a year, and was released on 21.9.51 only to be rearrested the same day under the same ordinance, and imprisoned until July 1952, when the country's Language Movement (Bhasha Adolan) was gaining importance.

Barada Bhushan Chakraborty was a guide to the students of the district who were involved in the Language movement. He was arrested for two years (1954–55), during which the movement was thinning.

When General Ayub Khan declared martial law, Barada Bhushan was among the leaders who protested. At this he was taken into custody by the new rulers without a specific charge and kept him in prison for two years. At this, protest erupted in both East and West Pakistan; before the High Court was to decide upon a Habeas Corpus petition on it, he was unconditionally released by the authorities. But when Pakistan and India were engaged in the War of 1965, he was arrested twice and kept in prison for about three years

During the Bangladesh Liberation War (Muktijuddha), Barada Bhushan led his district. He was arrested during this time and was placed, along with others, before the firing squad inside the Dinajpur Jail. Fortunately, at this hour the armed freedom fighters (Muktijoddhas) broke in the jail and snatched them out after a brief encounter with the Pakistani army. Thereafter Barada Bhushan remained in charge of the fighters' control room and kept the town free from Pakistani armies for 13 days, until the reinforced army raided the town killing hundreds. Barada Bhushan, along with thousands of the town, took refuge in India, guiding fighters from there. He returned to Bangladesh immediately after the independence, but with a frail health which aggravated his cancer.

Bhushan died on 5 November 1974 in Calcutta, where he was brought for cancer treatment with assistance from Sheikh Mujibur Rahman, the then prime minister of Bangladesh.
