= ARM Inamul Haque =

ARM Enamul Haque
- এআরএম এনামুল হক
- Born: October 1, 1921; Dhaka, Bangladesh
- Died: November 11, 1977 (aged 56)
- Education: Bangladesh University of Engineering and Technology (BUET)
- Occupation: Engineering
- Known for: Engineer and veteran social worker
- Notable work: Founders of Dhanmondi Club
- Title: Engineer

ARM Inamul Haque (October 1, 1921 – November 11, 1977; Dhaka, Bangladesh) was a Bangladeshi engineer, veteran and social worker. He is the first Bangladeshi posthumous eye donor.

== Early life and education ==
Born in Rajkhola area, Howrah district, West Bengal on October 1, 1921, Haque completed an engineering degree from Bangladesh University of Engineering and Technology (BUET) in 1946. He was one of the founders of the Bangladesh Diabetic Association and the founding general secretary of Dhanmondi Club (now Sheikh Jamal Dhanmondi Club).

== Career ==
Inamul Haque started his career by joining the Ahsanullah Engineering College (now BUET) in the teaching in 1946. Three years before his death, Haque made his will and donated his eyes. One of his corneas was added to the eye of the Weekly 2000 editor Shahadat Chowdhury and the other was added to the eye of a person named Ramjan Ali.
