= Nazma Akter =

Bangladeshi trade unionist

Nazma Akter (born 1975) is a Bangladeshi trade unionist and labour rights activist. She is the founder of the Awaj Foundation and the president of the Sommilito Garments Sramik Federation.

== Biography ==
Akter began working in a garment factory at the age of 11. She and her mother worked there more than 70 hours a week. As a child labourer, she did the same work as adult employees. At 12, she was fired for criticising working conditions at the factory.

In the 1990s, Akter became active in the trade union movement, where her aim was to reduce the mistreatment of women workers. In the 2000s, she founded the Sommilito Garments Sramik Federation, a union of garment workers with more than 70,000 members. She is also co-chair of the Asia-Pacific committee of IndustriALL Global Union.

In 2003, Akter founded the Awaj Foundation, a non-governmental organization that promotes workers' welfare.

Akter has said that garment factories can empower women by giving them more choices and opportunities; however, she opposes exploitative and unsafe labour practices and the unfair treatment of women workers. After the Rana Plaza collapse in 2013, she became a spokesperson for Make Amazon Pay, a campaign calling on Amazon to adopt safety protocols that would prevent a similar disaster.

Akter's work against poverty and for labour rights has been covered by the World Policy Institute, Channel 4 News and The Guardian. She spoke at the 4th Annual Global Female Leaders Summit. Progressive International has called her one of Bangladesh's most prominent union leaders.

Currently, Akter lives in Dhaka with her husband and their two children.
