= Nurunnessa Khatun Vidyavinodini =

Nurunnessa Khatun Vidyavinodini (1894–1975) was a Bangladeshi writer who is considered the first published female Muslim novelist in Bengal.

== Early life ==
Nurunnessa was born in 1894 in Shahpur, Murshidabad, Bengal Presidency, British Raj. Her family were conservative Muslims who did not allow her to get an education. After she was married she started her education with the active support of husband Qazi Golam Mohammad, a prominent lawyer at that time in Kolkata. She studied English language and literature. She and her contemporary female writers talked about the limitations of being confined to their homes with Amader Mahal (our home).

== Career ==
Nurunnessa's husband Qazi Golam Mohammad had to travel a great deal because of his job as an attorney which allowed her to see many different places. Her writings were inspired by her travels. Her poem, Ahban-Giti, was published in the monthly Kahinur on the occasion of Boishakh. In 1923 her first novel, Swapna-Drasta, was published. The novel deals with the life of a Muslim family. She wrote a historical novel about Muslim pioneers in India called Janoki Bai Ba Bharate Moslem Biratwa in 1924. In 1925 she wrote Atmadan, a book about self-sacrifice. Her collective works were published in 1929, called Nurunnessa Granthabali. She served as the president of Bangiya Muslim Mahila Sangha (Society of Bengal Muslim Women). She was awarded the title Vidyavinodini by Nikhil Bharat Banga Sahitya Sammelan for her literary contribution. She left Murshidabad, West Bengal, India for Dhaka, East Bengal, Pakistan in 1952, where she settled permanently. She was a women's right activist and called for mothers to ensure the education of their daughters.

== Death ==
On 6 April 1975 Nurunnessa died in Dhaka, Bangladesh. The University of Dhaka awards the Nurunnessa Khatun Bidda-Binodini Gold Medal annually to female students for outstanding academic achievement as Samina Luthfa received the award.
