= Manusher Mon =

1972 Bangladeshi film

- Poster
- Directed by: Mostafa Mehmud
- Starring: Razzak; Bobita; Anwara Begum; Anwar Hossain
- Music by: Satya Saha
- Release date: 12 February 1972
- Country: Bangladesh
- Language: Bengali

Manusher Mon is a 1972 Bangladeshi film directed by Mostafa Mehmud and starring Razzak and Bobita in lead roles. It was released on 12 February 1972 and is the first film released in independent Bangladesh, following its birth on 16 December 1971.

== Music ==
All songs composed by Satya Saha with lyrics written by Gazi Mazharul Anwar.

- "Ami Kotodin Kotoraat Bhebechhi" - Sabina Yasmin, Mohammad Ali Siddiqui
- "O Nagini, Nagini" - Sabina Yasmin, Mohammad Ali Siddiqui
- "Gaaner Kotha" - Ferdousi Rahman
- "Chhobi Jeno Shudhu Chhobi Noy" - Khurshid Alam
- "Ei Shohore Ami Je Ek" - Mohammad Ali Siddiqui

== Reception ==
Wroted by Bangla News 24's survey "The first film of independent Bangladesh, 'Manuser Mon,' directed by Mostafa Mehmud, was released from FDC on February 14, 1972. It starred Nayak Raj Razzak, Bobita, and Anwar Hossain. The commercial success of this film revitalized the Bangladeshi film industry".
