= Hatem Ali Khan =

Bangladeshi politician

Member of National Assembly

Personal details
- Born: 24 November 1904 Belua
- Party: United Front
- Other political affiliations: Communist Party of India
- Spouse: Karrimun Nessa
- Children: 5

Hatem Ali Khan (1904-1977) was a United Front politician and the former Member of National Assembly of Pakistan.

== Early life ==
Khan was born on 24 November 1904 in Belua, Gopalpur, Tangail, Bengal Presidency, British Raj. His father Nayeb Ali Khan was a local landlord. In 1920 he graduated from Hemnagar High School and the next year he joined Ripon College, Calcutta. During his time in Kolkata he met Surya Sen, Kazi Nazrul Islam and others. He worked the rights of peasants in Bengal. He graduated from Ripon college in 1924. He campaigned against landlords, and published the magazine "Sarbahara". He published two more magazines afterwards called Chashi-Majur and Din-Majur. He finished in BA in 1926 and MA in 1928 from Calcutta University. He married in 1927 to Karrimun Nessa and went on to have 6 kids.

== Career ==
In 1933 he returned to his village Belua from Kolkata. In 1946 he was in the leadership role of Tebhaga movement of the Communist Party of India in his village. He laid siege to the house of Zamidars in his village, and as such was accused in the number of cases filed against him by the Zamidars. The case were dismissed due to lack of witnesses and lawyers who would work for the plaintiffs against him.

Following the 1950 communal riots thousands of refugees moved to then East Pakistan from Assam, Tripura, and West Bengal. Khan worked in the effort for their rehabilitation. In 1954 he was elected to National Assembly as an candidate of the United Front from Gopalganj. In 1976 he was elected chairman of Kendrio Krishak Samity.

== Death ==
He died on 24 October 1977.
