= Khan Mohammad Moinuddin =

- Born: 30 October 1930; Charigram village, Singair Upazila, Manikganj District, Bengal Presidency, British India
- Died: 16 February 1981 (aged 50); Dhaka, Bangladesh

Khan Mohammad Moinuddin (30 October 1930 – 16 February 1981) was a Bangladeshi writer. He was awarded Ekushey Padak in 1978 by the Government of Bangladesh. He is most remembered for being a children's poet in the 1950s and '60s.

== Career ==
At an early age, Moinuddin moved to Calcutta and worked at a Kolkata Binding House as a bookbinder. After completing his primary education, he attended the Calcutta Corporation Teachers' Training College. He later worked in Calcutta Corporation Free Primary School for twenty years.

In 1923, Moinuddin was the editor of the magazine Muslim Jagat. He was sentenced to 6 months in Hooghly Jail for publishing an editorial entitled Bidroha. While incarcerated, he met the poet Kazi Nazrul Islam. In 1947 he moved to Dhaka and established a publishing house Alhamra Library.

== Books ==
- Muslim Birangana (1936)
- Amader Nabi (1941)
- Dr Shafiker Motor Boat (1949)
- Khulafa-e-Rashedin (1951)
- Arabya Rajani (1957)
- Baba Adam (1958)
- Swapna Dekhi (1959)
- Lal Morog (1961)
- Shapla Phool (1962)
- Paler Nao (1956)
- He Manus (1958)
- Artanad (1958)
- Anathini (1926)
- Naya Sadak (1967)
- Jhumkolata (1956)
- Jugasrasta Nazrul (1957)

== Awards ==
- Bangla Academy Literary Award (1960)
- UNESCO prize (1960)
- Ekushey Padak (1978)
