= List of Bangladeshi films of 1973 =

A list of Bangladesh films released in 1973.

== Releases ==
Title	Director	Cast	Genre	Notes	Release date	Ref(s)
Titash Ekti Nadir Naam	Ritwik Ghatak	Rosy Samad, Kabori Sarwar, Rowshan Jamil, Rani Sarkar, Ritwik Ghatak	Drama	Based on the novel of Advaita Malla Burman	27 July	
Rangbaaz	Zahirul Haque	Hashmot, Anwar Hossain, Kabori Sarwar, Abdur Razzak				
Quiet Flows the Meghna	Alamgir Kabir	Bulbul Ahmed, Bobita, Anwar Hossain	War, History, Drama	Based on Bangladesh Liberation War		
Abar Tora Manush Ho	Khan Ataur Rahman	Raisul Islam Asad, Bobita	War, History, Drama	Based on Bangladesh Liberation War		
Pogrom In Bangladesh	Alamgir Kabir		Documentary	Based on Bangladesh Liberation War		
Jibon Trishna	H Akbar					
Debor	Sheikh Latif					
Khelaghar	Abdul Jabbar Khan					
Balaka Mon	Subhash Dutta					
Priyotoma	Ashok Ghosh					
Bodhu Mata Konya	Ali Kausar					
Jhorer Pakhi	C B Zaman					
Polatak	Rupokar					
Jaha Bolibo Satya Bolibo	Babul Chowdhury					
Yiye Kore Biye	Yusuf Zahir	Bobita, Uzzal, Samina, Bulbul Ahmed, Baby Zaman, Khalil	Comedy, Romance			
Rater Por Din	Mohsin	Wasim (acting debut)				
Ekhane Akash Nil	Hashmot					
Ke Tumi	M Rahman					
Shoti Nari	Sheikh Anowar Hossain					
Paaye Chola Path	Mehmood					
Mon Niye Khela	Montu Pardeshi					
Duranta Durbar	Mohiuddin					
Anirban	Kamal Ahmed					
Apobad	Azizur Rahman					
Doshyurani	Sirajul Islam Bhuiyan					
Amar Jonmobhumi	Alamgir Kumkum					
Doyal Murshid	Sheikh Mohiuddin	Suchanda, Anwar Hossain, Mehfuz, Sattar, Murad, Anis Shamsu				
Slogan	Kabir Anwar					
Angikar						
Atithi	Azizur Rahman					

== See also ==
- 1973 in Bangladesh
