= Zulfikar Haidar =

Bangladeshi poet (1899–1987)

Sufi Zulfikar Haidar
- জুলফিকার হায়দর
- Born: 19 November 1899; Bhaturia, Tipperah District, Bengal Presidency (now Bangladesh)
- Died: 23 April 1987 (aged 87); Dhaka, Bangladesh
- Occupations: Writer, poet
- Known for: Broken Sword, Make Muslim again, Revolution Revolution II Revolution
- Awards: Ekushey Padak (1978)

Zulfikar Haidar (Bengali: জুলফিকার হায়দর; 19 November 1899 – 23 April 1987) was a Bangladeshi poet. For his Islamic writings, the Government of Pakistan gave him the title Sitara-e-Khidmat. He was also honored by the People's Republic of Bangladesh with the Ekushey Padak in 1978.

== Early life and education ==
Haidar was born on 19 November 1899 (18 Ogrohayon 1306 BS) to a Bengali family in the village of Bhaturia in Nabinagar, Tipperah District, Bengal Presidency (now in Brahmanbaria District, Bangladesh). His father, Mawlawi Mahmud Jamal, was employed at the Settlement Office (Land Record Department), and his mother Chand Bibi was a housewife. His grandfather Haji Amir Ahmed was renowned in Comilla for his philanthropy. His began his education at Noor Nagar Primary School. Before his Secondary School Certificate examination in 1917, he left home and went to Calcutta. There he joined the British Indian Army to fight in World War I and went to Bombay for his training. After his training he was sent to Baghdad to fight in the war. He returned to Calcutta after the war.

== Awards and recognition ==
- Sitara-e-Khidmat
- Ekushey Padak (1978)
- Nazrul Memorial Award (1985)
