= Mostafa Mehmud =

Bangladeshi film director

Mostafa Mehmud (16 January 1936 – 9 April 2017) was a Bangladeshi film director who made his film debut with Songsar (1968). In 1972, he directed the first film released in independent Bangladesh, Manusher Mon starring Razzak and Bobita.

== Filmography ==
- Dui Bhai (1968)
- Momer Alo (1968)
- Songsar (1968)
- Mayar Songsar (1969)
- Manusher Mon (1972)
