= Mostak Ahmad =

Bangladeshi Sports Person

Havildar Mostak Ahmad
- মোস্তাক আহমদ
- Citizenship: Bangladesh
- Occupations: Soldier, Athlete
- Parent: Latif Ahmed (father)
- Awards: Independence Day Award (1977)

Mostak Ahmad is an athlete and veteran of the Bangladesh Liberation War. He was awarded the Independence Day Award, Bangladesh's "highest civilian award" in 1977 for outstanding achievements in sports.

== Career ==
Ahmed began his career as a soldier. He directly participated in the Bangladesh Liberation war.

== Awards ==
He was awarded the "Independence Day Award" in 1977 for his unique general skill in sports.
