= Shashwata Banga =

Shashwata Banga (Bengali: শাশ্বত বঙ্গ) is a book on Bengali language, Bengali literature, and the cultural history of Bengalis. It is considered an important documentary work in Bengali literature. It offers a perspective on the thoughts and culture of Bengali society. The language and analysis of the book encourage intellectual thought, making it recognized as a progressive piece of Bengali literature. The book reflects the ideas of the Freedom of Intellect Movement.

== Description ==
=== Writing and content ===
The author of Shashwata Banga is Kazi Abdul Wadud (1894–1970), who was a renowned literary figure and thinker of the 20th century. The book was first published in the Bengali year 1358 (1951 AD) in Kolkata. It includes a collection of 75 essays, along with one poem, focusing on Bengali society, literature, culture, and thought. Other notable works by Kazi Abdul Wadud include Nabarpjay, Rabindra Kabbya Path, Samaj o Sahitya, and Nazrul Pratibha.

In the essays, Kazi Abdul Wadud discusses and analyzes the thoughts and influence of figures like Rammohan Roy, Rabindranath Tagore, Kazi Nazrul Islam, and leaders of the Freedom of Intellect Movement. He explores the cultural and social progress of Bengali Muslims and reevaluates Hindu-Muslim relations.

== Background and literary influence ==
Shashwata Banga primarily consists of essays analyzing 20th-century Bengali society and culture. Kazi Abdul Wadud was associated with the Freedom of Intellect Movement, which was initiated in the 1920s under the banner of the Muslim Sahitya-Samaj in Dhaka. The goal of this movement was to awaken intellectual discourse and freedom of thought within the Bengali Muslim community. The essays in this book reflect the ideas of this movement.

The book is written in the context of the Bengal Renaissance and the social changes in Bengali society. It discusses the influence of the Renaissance and the reformist movements initiated by Rammohan Roy in the 19th century. Additionally, Kazi Abdul Wadud analyzes reforms and societal changes within the Muslim community.

The book covers not only Hindu-Muslim relations but also delves into the broader thoughts and progress of the entire society. It shows a confluence of traditional and modern thoughts in Indian society.
