= Freedom of Intellect Movement =

Bengal Renaissance movement

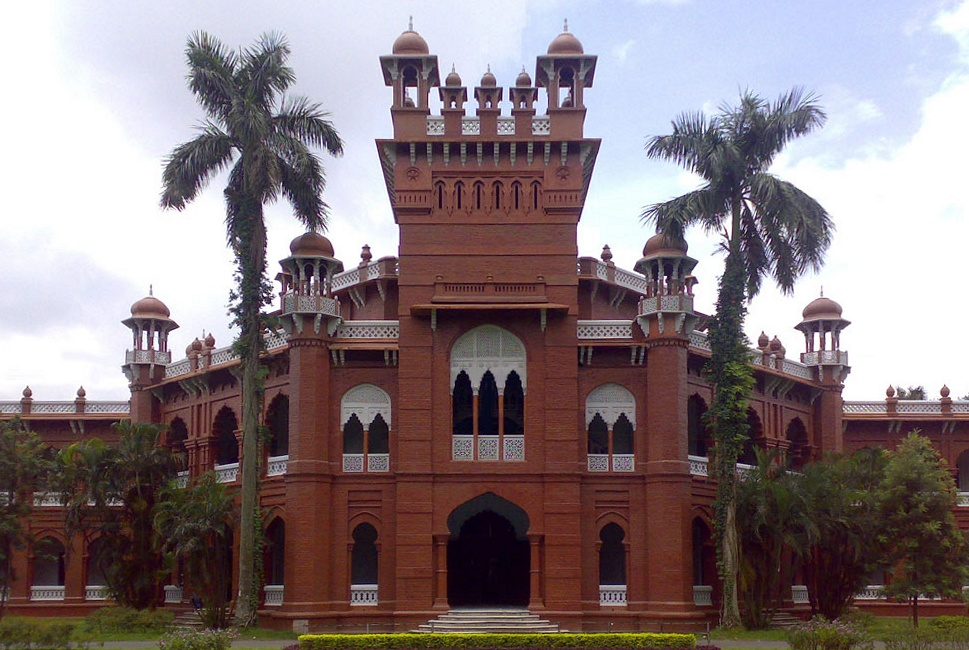
- Formation: 19 January 1926
- Founded at: Dhaka University
- Official language: Bengali

The Freedom of Intellect Movement was a Bengal Renaissance movement advocating rationality against religious and social dogma in Bengali Muslim society. It was spearheaded by intellectuals in the University of Dhaka during the British Raj.The movement also established the prestigious Muslim Literary Society in Dhaka.

Freedom of Intellect Movement was a Bengal Renaissance movement that promoted rationalism and spoke against religious and social ideologies within the Bengali Muslim community. This movement was led by intellectuals from Dhaka University during the time of the British Raj. The movement's primary publication was called ‘Shikha.’ On the first page of ‘Shikha’, it stated, "Where knowledge is limited, intellect is bound, and freedom is impossible." One of the major successes of this movement was the establishment of the prestigious Muslim Sahitya Samaj in Dhaka. Notable members included Kazi Abdul Wadud, Abul Fazal, Muhammad Shahidullah, Qazi Motahar Hossain, Kazi Nazrul Islam and Abdul Quadir.

== History ==
The Freedom of Intellect Movement began with the formation of the ‘Muslim Sahitya Samaj’ (Muslim Literary Society) in 1926. Its primary goal was to eliminate religious dogma, ignorance, and superstitions from society and promote rational and secular thinking. Notable members of the movement included Kazi Abdul Wadud, Abul Fazl, Muhammad Shahidullah, Qazi Motahar Hossain, Kazi Nazrul Islam, and Abdul Quadir.

At the beginning of the 20th century, the Bengali Muslim community harbored resentment toward British rule and distanced itself from modern knowledge and science. Due to this antagonism, the Muslim society fell behind in education, economics, and social progress. On the contrary, the Hindu community accepted British rule and progressed through modern education. The Freedom of Intellect Movement aimed to change this situation in society.

The movement was spearheaded by the Muslim Sahitya Samaj, founded on 19 January 1926 at Muslim Hall in Dhaka University, under the leadership of Professor Dr. Muhammad Shahidullah of the Bengali and Cultural Department. Other key leaders included Abul Hussain, Kazi Abdul Wadud, Qazi Motahar Hossain, Motaher Hossain Chowdhury, Abdul Quadir, and several other intellectuals.

== Objectives and programs ==
The Freedom of Intellect Movement was founded on the principles of rationalism, secularism, and humanism. The movement's primary goal was to lead an intellectual and literary drive that opposed blind superstition, religious dogma, and backwardness in Bengali Muslim society, while promoting rationalism, humanity, and scientific thinking.

At the second annual conference of the ‘Muslim Sahitya Samaj,’ it was declared, "We want to open our eyes and truly experience life, and we want to burn away the superstitions." The movement aimed to address the crisis of self-identity within the Muslim community and promote scientific thinking and humanism.

In 1929, after the publication of Abul Hussain’s article ‘Adesh-er Nigraha’ (Suppression of Commandments), there was a strong backlash from conservative circles in Dhaka. This event forced Abul Hussain to issue an apology, which became a significant episode in the movement. Though he later resigned, this event did not halt the movement's progress.

== Impact ==
The Freedom of Intellect Movement initiated a renaissance in the Bengali Muslim society. Although it did not directly oppose religion, it strongly voiced against the conservatism and superstitions in society. This movement inspired a new wave of thought within Bengali Muslim society.

The movement continued its activities until 1936, spreading its ideas through the ‘Shikha’ magazine. Though the movement’s influence eventually waned, its teachings and ideals remain foundational to the progressive values of Bengali society today.
