= Muslim Sahitya-Samaj =

Organisation Based in Dhaka

- Formation: 19 January 1926
- Type: Literary; Cultural

Muslim Sahitya-Samaj was an influential literary and cultural organization. It was based in Dhaka.

== History ==
Muslim Sahitya-Samaj (Muslim Literary society) was founded on 19 January 1926 in a meeting at Muslim Hall Union office. The meeting was presided by Muhammad Shahidullah, professor at the Department of Bengali and Sanskrit in Dhaka University. Professor Abul Husain, Department of Economics and Commerce of Dhaka University, A F M Abdul Huq, a student of Dhaka University residing in Muslim Hall, and Abdul Quadir, a student of Dhaka Collegiate School were charged with running the organisation and were the first executive committee of the society. Professors Kazi Abdul Wadud and Anwarul Qadir.

The Muslim Sahitya-Samaj operated for a total of 11 years before becoming dormant. Professor Charu Chandra Bandopaddhay presided over the first session of the organization. In 1938, there were attempts to revive the organization but they did not succeed and after 1939 all activities ceased. They supported Freedom of intellect and encourage secular traditions. It aimed to promote education among Bengali Muslims. Despite having Muslim in its name, it was a secular organization that had non-Muslim speakers. The organization was by choice non-political. It was an organization of students and teachers.

== Publication ==
Shikha was the official journal of the Muslim Sahitya-Samaj. The first issue of the journal was published in April 1927. It had 144 pages and was priced half a rupee. The Editor of the magazine was Professor Abul Hussain of the economics department of Dhaka University. The journal was published from the Salimullah Muslim Hall by Abdul Quadir on behalf of the Muslim Sahitya-Samaj and printed by Munshi Ahmed Ali from the Islamia Press at Sat Rauza (Dhaka). Total five issues of the Shikha were published. The second and third issues were edited by Qazi Motahar Hossain and were published in October 1928 and 1929. The fourth and fifth issues were edited by Muhammad Abdur Rashid and Abul Fazl and published in 1930 and 1931. The last four issues were published by Syed Imamul Hossain from the Modern Library of Nawabpur (Dhaka). These were priced half a rupee, one rupee, half a rupee and three quarters of a rupee. Every issue of the journal used to contain reports on the organisation's periodic and annual conferences as well as the essays read at those conferences. It contained reports on the year-long activities of the Muslim Sahitya-Samaj. Official slogan of the magazine was "'Where knowledge is limited, intellect is inert, freedom is impossible". This slogan was regarded by the journal's writers as their motto or guiding principle.
