= St. Gregory's High School and College =

- সেন্ট গ্রেগরী হাই স্কুল অ্যান্ড কলেজ

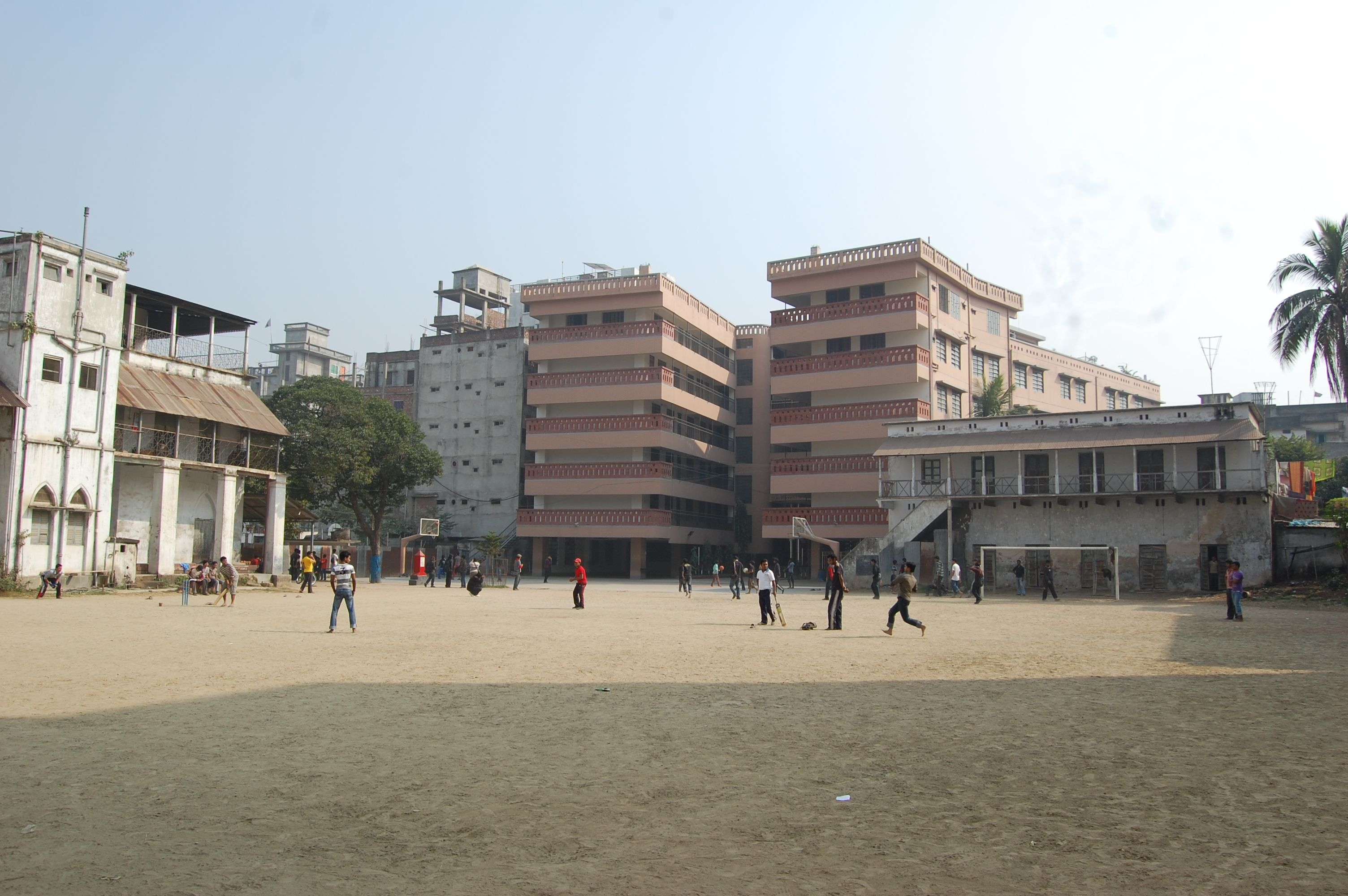

Location
- 82 Municipal Office Street, Luxmibazar, Sutrapur; 82 Municipal Office Street, Luxmibazar, Sutrapur, Dhaka-1100; Dhaka, Bangladesh, 1100; Bangladesh
- 23.7082°N 90.4144°E

Information
- Former name: St. Gregory's High School (SGHS)
- School type: High School & College
- Established: 1882; 144 years ago
- Founder: Gregory De Groote
- School board: Board of Intermediate and Secondary Education, Dhaka
- Principal: Bro. Placid Peter Rebeiro, CSC
- Gender: Boys
- Age range: 4 y/o to 19 y/o (max.)
- Classes: 1-12 for Bengali Version; Nursery-10 for English Version
- Language: English, Bengali
- Campuses: 3 Institutional Buildings
- Campus: Urban
- Campus size: 5,581.89 m² (approximately); 1,524.89 m² [Field]
- Area: 2,548.52 m² (approximately)
- Sports: Basketball, Football, Cricket, Handball, Rugby, Chess
- National ranking: 9th (2025 SSC GPA-5 Ranking)
- Yearbook: The Gregorian, Tiny Tots, Shoptoporna (সপ্তপর্ণা)
- Alumni name: The Gregorian Association
- Nobel laureates: Amartya Sen
- Website: sghscdhaka.edu.bd

St. Gregory's High School & College is a Catholic school in Dhaka, Bangladesh. It was founded in 1882, when the city was part of British India, by Gregory De Groote, a Belgian Benedictine priest. The school, located on Municipal office street of the Luxmibazar neighborhood of Old Dhaka, was named after Pope Gregory I (540–604). Brother Placid Peter Rebeiro, CSC, is the current principal of the institution.

== History ==
In 1882, the American priests of the Congregation of Holy Cross took over the Vicariate of East Bengal from the Benedictine Fathers. At the time, Mr. and Mrs. Wise — who were Protestants — ran a school in the present Wiseghat area near the River Buriganga. In this school, most of the students were of European or Anglo-Indian Catholic communities. Anglican and Baptist pastors were allowed to teach religion at this school. Father Francis Boers, CSC, made numerous efforts to be a teacher of Catholic Religion to the Catholic students at the school, but was not allowed. Out of frustration, he started an English-medium school on the grounds of the present adjoining St. Francis Xavier's Convent and girls' high school, that came into being later. The renamed St. Gregory's School shifted to the present site in 1896.

Until 1912, both boys and girls were students of St. Gregory's High School. When St. Francis Xavier Girls' School came into being in 1912, St. Gregory's became a boys-only school. After the creation of Pakistan in 1947, the school started the Bengali-medium section. After the independence of Bangladesh in 1971, the school had only a Bengali-medium section. In 2008, the institution established an English-Version section, which is still operational. Currently, both Bengali-Medium section and English-Version section runs parallelly.

Early in 1914, a one-story building was torn down to make room for the present "Darjeeling" building and the latrines. Also, the scout troop, the first in Dhaka, was started and had 40 scouts. Bengali replaced Latin as a second language in 1915. Later that year, Fr. Crowley resigned as headmaster.

Basketball was introduced into the school in 1923, which is believed to be the first time basketball was played in the country. In July 1923, Fr. Hennessy gained permission to change the European-style school to the Education Board examination. On June 2, 1924, permanent recognition was granted to St. Gregory's School.

Amartya Sen, who won a Nobel Prize in Economics in 1998, had been a student of St. Gregory's High School. During a visit to Dhaka on December 19, 1998, he visited the school of his childhood and was present at a groundbreaking ceremony for the new school building.

In 2016, the school was upgraded to Higher Secondary level by the Ministry of Education. Since then, the institute has been registered as St. Gregory's High School & College.

The demonym for the students of the school is "Gregorian". The "Gregorian Association" is the official alumni association of this school, founded in 1985.

1971 Massacre by the occupying Pakistani military:

Two of the three teachers of St. Gregory's High School who were murdered by the occupying Pakistani army in 1971 were kidnapped from the school premises on March 31, 1971. The teachers were taken to a nearby army camp in Jagannath College. On that day, the two teachers, Mr. N.C. Sutradhar and Mr. D.N. Pal Chaudhury, along with two of his teenage sons, Shoibal and Utpal who were students of St. Gregory's High School at the time, had been murdered. Mr. Monoranjan Poddar, a student of Jagannath College and Mr. Sutradhar's brother-in-law had also been kidnapped by the Pakistani army from the school and was murdered on March 31, 1971. At least 30 other people were taken from St. Gregory's High School that day, who were also murdered by the Pakistani army. Br. Robert Hughes, C.S.C, the Headmaster of the school, tried to secure the two teachers’ release but failed.

The Pakistan army killed the retired teacher, Mr. Peter D'Costa, with 13 other villagers at Rangamatia Village of the then Dhaka District on November 26, 1971. For their respect this Memorial was made where every student of St. Gregory's High School shows respect every year on 31 March.

=== Closure ===
On November 24, 2024, the campus was targeted and moderately vandalised by an enraged mob of nearby college students, as a part of the ongoing violence, alleging the wrongful death of a student of Mahbubur Rahman Mollah College due to medical negligence. In response to this violence, the authorities decided to indefinitely halt all activities.

== Headmasters ==
- Fr. Gregory De Groote (1882–1888)
- Fr. F. A. Boeres CSC (1889–1910)
- Fr. J. Fieffer (1911)
- Fr. T. Crowly CSC (1912–1915)
- Fr. P. Boulay CSC (1916–1918)
- Fr. A. Blin CSC (1919–1921)
- Bro. Bertin CSC (1922–1924)
- Fr. Finner CSC (1925–1926)
- Bro. Anthony CSC (1926–1929)
- Bro. Walter CSC (1929–1933) & (1935–1937)
- Bro. Neil CSC (1934)
- Bro. John Heim CSC (1938)
- Bro. Bernadine CSC (1939–1940)
- Bro. Jude CSC (1940–1950)
- Bro. James CSC (1950–1955)
- Bro. Martinian CSC (1955–1957)
- Bro. Fulgence CSC (1957–1962)
- Bro. Thomas Moore CSC (1962–1968)
- Bro. Robert CSC (1968–1977)
- Bro. John Rozario CSC (1977–1981)
- Bro. Gerald Kraegar (1981–1992)
- Bro. Marcel Duchesne (1992–1995)
- Bro. Bijoy Rodrigues CSC (1995)
- Fr. J.S. Peixotto CSC (1998–2000)
- Bro. Robi Purification CSC (1995–2012)
- Bro. Prodip Placid Gomes CSC (2012–2016)

== Principals ==
- Bro. Prodip Placid Gomes CSC (2016 - 2021)
- Bro. Leo J. Pereira, CSC (2022)
- Bro. Ujjal Placid Pereira, CSC (2022–2024)
- Bro. Placid Peter Rebeiro, CSC (2024–present)

== Notable alumni ==
Politics

- Tajuddin Ahmad (First Prime Minister of the People's Republic of Bangladesh)
- Kamal Hossain (Minister of Foreign Affairs, 1973–1975)
- A. Q. M. Badruddoza Chowdhury (President of the People's Republic of Bangladesh, 2001–2002)
- Iftekhar Ahmed Chowdhury (Foreign Affairs Advisor)
- Osman Faruk (Minister of Education, 2001–2006)
- A. K. Faezul Huq (Politician, lawyer, and freelance journalist)
- Syed Najmuddin Hashim (Diplomat)
- Faqueer (Fakir) Shahabuddin (First Attorney General of the People's Republic of Bangladesh)
- Mizanur Rahman Shelley (Minister of Information and Broadcasting, and Minister of Irrigation, Water Development, and Flood Control, 1990)

Education

- Amartya Sen (Nobel laureate in Economics, 1998)
- Jamilur Reza Choudhury (Vice-Chancellor of BRAC University, Advisor of first Interim Government)
- Serajul Islam Choudhury

Culture

- Mustafa Zaman Abbasi (Folk singer)
- Samar Das (Performing artist)
- Shahriar Kabir (Writer and human rights activist)
- Qazi Anwar Hussain (founder of 'SEBA Prokashoni' and the creator of famous character 'Masud Rana')
- Bhanu Bandopadhyay (Comedian)
- Kaykobad (Bengali poet)
- Hayat Mamud (Essayist-poet)
- Mahfuz Anam (Editor of The Daily Star)
- Robin Ghosh (Bangladeshi-Pakistani music composer and singer)

Sports

- Raqibul Hasan (First captain of Bangladesh Cricket Team)
- Raisuddin Ahmed (Cricketer and cricket administrator)
- Enamul Hossain Rajib (5th Grandmaster of Bangladesh)
- Ashraful Haque (cricketer, chief-executive of Asian Cricket Council)
- Abdur Rahim (international footballer and coach)
- Mohammad Shahjahan (international football coach and administrator)
