= Olivia Gomez =

Bangladeshi actress (born 1953)

- অলিভিয়া গোমেজ
- Born: 16 February 1953 (age 73); Karachi, Sindh, Dominion of Pakistan
- Occupation: Actress
- Spouse: SM Shafi (m. 1972; died 1995)

Olivia Gomez (born 16 February 1953) is a Bangladeshi actress. Gomez become notable in the 1970s for role in the film "The Rain" (1976). She has had parts in 53 films.

== Background ==
Gomez's ancestors were originated from Goa, India. Gomez was born on 16 February 1953 in Karachi in the then Dominion of Pakistan. She had three brothers and three sisters. After the Bangladesh Liberation War in 1971, her family migrated to the Ispahani Colony in the Maghbazar area of Dhaka, Bangladesh. One of her sisters worked as a flight attendant for Biman Bangladesh Airlines and another one lived in Kolkata, India. Their father worked at the reading section of The Bangladesh Observer. Olivia studied in an English-medium school in Dhaka. She worked as a receptionist at Hotel Purbani.

== Career ==
Gomez started modeling at the age of 14.

Gomez debuted her acting career through the film Chhanda Hariya Gelo in 1972. In 1976, she acted in Bonhishikha along with Uttam Kumar.

Gomez performed in multiple films with actor Wasim, including Dost Dushmon (1977).

Gomez retired from her film career in 1995 after her husband, a filmmaker, SM Shafi, had died due to cardiac problems. Her last film was Dushmoni.

== Filmography ==
Notable films performed by Gomez include:

- Chhanda Hariye Gelo (1972)
- Jibon Sangeet (1972)
- Masud Rana (1974)
- Teer Bhanga Dheu (1975)
- The Rain (1976)
- Bonhishikha (1976)
- Bahadur (1976)
- Sheyana (1976)
- Jadur Bashi (1977)
- Dost Dushmon (1977)
- Tokdirer Khela (1989)
- Shapath Nilam
- Takar Khela
- Dur Theke Bolchhi
- Shatinath Kannya
- Pagla Raja
- Bhaibon
- Shahjadi
- Gulbahar
- Beddin
- Srimati 420
- Chandralekha
- Takkar
- Himmatwali
- Darling
- Rastar Raja
- Bondhu
- Laal Memshaheb
- Nag Nagini
- Jangli Rani
- Jamana
- Shapmukti
- Ekaler Nayak
- Kuasha
- Aguner Khela
- Kala Khun
- Agun Pani
- Dushmoni
