= Padmar Dheu Re =

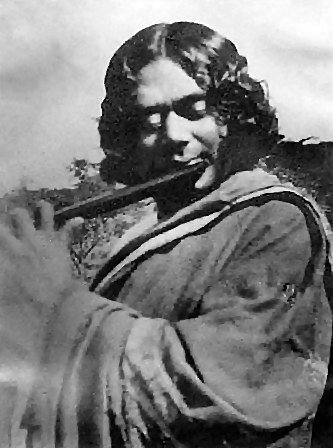
- Kazi Nazrul Islam, composer of the song

Song by Sachin Dev Burman
- Language: Bengali
- Released: 1941
- Recorded: 1941
- Studio: Bharatlakshi Studio
- Venue: Kolkata, British India (present)West Bengal, India
- Genre: Nazrul Geeti
- Length: 3:05(Original song)
- Label: Hindustan Record Company
- Songwriter: Kazi Nazrul Islam
- Composer: Kazi Nazrul Islam
- Producer: Kazi Nazrul Islam

Padmar Dheu Re a divisive Nazrul Geeti composed in the Bhatiali style. The popular song, set to the lyrics of Bangladesh's national poet Kazi Nazrul Islam and set to a fast Dadra rhythm, was first recorded in the voice of Sachin Debbarman. This song was first released in 1941 by the then Hindustan Record Company from Kolkata. Later, in 1959, the song was compiled in the second volume of Nazrul's collection of poems 'Bulbul', published by the poet's wife, Pramila Nazrul, from the DM Library in Kolkata. The song is based on a poem about the Padma River. The song became more popular after Sachin Debbarman in the voices of Firoza Begum, Ferdousi Rahman and Khairul Anam Shakil. The singers of this song are regularly mentioned as 'analogy' in articles written about the Padma River.

== Background ==
'Chokh Gel Pakhire' and 'Padmar Dheure'. Kumar Sachin Dev Burman remains forever new in those two songs. Those two songs are an immortal creation of Nazrul and Sachin Dev, an unfading signature of their joint talent.

— Shailjanand Mukherjee in the book 'Sur-Sabhay Nazrul'

A film titled 'Nandini' was released in 1941. The poet's childhood friend Shailjanand Mukherjee wrote the story, screenplay and directed the film Nandini. At the request of his friend Shailjanand, Kazi Nazrul Islam composed and arranged the music for the song titled "Chokh Gel Chokh Gel" for the film. The song became popular after the film was released. Due to its popularity, Hindustan Record Company took the initiative to release the song in gramophone record form. In addition to the song Chokh Gel Chokh Gel on one side of the record, another song was required on the other side. When the poet was requested to compose a song for the other side of the record, he composed the song Padmar Dheu Re.

== Music recording, marketing and compilation ==
The poet used a quick Dadra rhythm in the composition of the song Padmar Dheu Re. He had nominated Sachin Debbarman to sing the songs Chokh Gel Chokh Gel and Padmar Dheu Re simultaneously. Sachin lent his voice to these two songs in the presence of the poet and Shailjanand at the Bharatlakshi Studio in Kolkata. In 1941, the year of the release of the film 'Nandini', the Hindustan Record Company marketed the two songs as gramophone records (number: H 969). The lyrics and notation of the song were compiled in the second volume of the Nazrul Giti Sangrah Bulbul, on the poet's birthday in 1959 (1352 Bengali), at the initiative of the poet's wife, Pramila Nazrul.

== Acceptance in popular culture ==
The song is one of the most popular songs sung by Sachin Devbarman. Sachin used the tune of this song in the song 'Pardesi Re' while composing the music for the 1950 Hindi film Afsar. The song was recorded in the voice of actress Suraiya. Apart from Sachin, Firoza Begum, Ferdousi Rahman and Khairul Anam have become the most popular under the voice of Shakil. Banglavision named one of their music shows after this song. Writers have used the first four lines of this song's simile many times in their memoirs about the Padma River or in their descriptions of its beauty.(Example)
