= Mahmudur Rahman Benu =

Bangladeshi musician

- মাহমুদুর রহমান বেণু
- Born: 1942 or 1943 (age 83–84)
- Occupation: Musician

Mahmudur Rahman Benu (born 1942/1943) is a Bangladeshi musician and organizer. He was awarded the Ekushey Padak in 2022 for his contribution to music.

== Career ==
Benu was an apprentice of Waheedul Haq. He was a professor of statistics at Institute of Statistical Research and Training (ISRT) and a music teacher at Chhayanaut.

Benu led his musician team, Mukti Sangrami Shilpi Sangstha, during the 1971 Liberation War.

Benu lived in Leeds for his PhD and later in Sheffield during 1973–1993 until he moved London.
