= The Rain (film) =

- Poster
- Directed by: S. M. Shafi
- Screenplay by: S. M. Shafi
- Story by: Nazmul Masriq
- Starring: Wasim; Olivia; Syed Hasan Imam; Rosy Afsari
- Edited by: Aminul Islam Mintu
- Music by: Anwar Parvez; Alauddin Ali (background score)
- Release date: 26 November 1976 (Bangladesh)
- Running time: 131 minutes
- Country: Bangladesh
- Languages: Bengali; Urdu

The Rain (Bengali: দি রেইন) is a 1976 Bengali-Urdu bilingual Bangladeshi film which stars Wasim and Olivia in lead roles. The film earned two awards at the 2nd Bangladesh National Film Awards.

== Soundtrack Bangla ==
No.	Title	Singer	Length
1.	"Chanchal Haware Ar Kutha"	Runa Laila	5:27
2.	"Eka Eka Keno Bhalo Lagena"	Runa Laila	3:17
3.	"Chokhe Jodi Chokh Pore"	Runa Laila	4:04
4.	"Mone Mone Joubone Laglo"	Runa Laila	3:53
5.	"Ami Toh Aaj Bhule Gechi"	Mahmudunnabi	3:51

== Soundtrack Urdu ==
No.	Title	Singer	Length
1.	"Chal Re Hawa Tu Dhire"	Runa Laila	6:04
2.	"Akela Mein Jia Nahi Lage"	Runa Laila	4:42
3.	"Tumse Mujhe Kuch Kehna"	Runa Laila	4:45
4.	"Hole Hole Jauban Mein"	Runa Laila	4:03

== Awards ==
2nd Bangladesh National Film Awards

- Best Male Playback Singer – Mahmudunnabi;
- Best Female Playback Singer – Runa Laila
