= Tin Goyenda =

Series of juvenile detective novels written by Rakib Hasan

- Cover of Volume 103 Of Tin Goyenda Series
- Author: Rakib Hasan; Shamsuddin Nawab
- Cover artist: Ranbir Ahmed Biplob; Victor Nill
- Language: Bangla
- Series: Tin Goyenda
- Genre: Thriller/Mystery/Adventure
- Publisher: Sheba Prokashoni
- Publication date: 1985 – present
- Publication place: Bangladesh
- Media type: Print (Paperback)

Tin Goyenda (Bengali: তিন গোয়েন্দা [tin ɡoenda]) is a series of juvenile detective novels written by Rakib Hasan and published in Bangladesh by Sheba Prokashoni. The Tin Goyenda series is a subseries of Kishore Thriller (juvenile thriller) series of Sheba Prokashoni. Apart from Tin Goyenda, Kishore Thriller Adventure is another subseries. The books were made into a TV series in 2014, where the main protagonist 'Kishore Pasha' was starred by Kabyo Shagore Nurul Momen.

== Main characters ==
Tin Goyenda is the tale of three teenager detectives. They are investigators and adventurers.

The three teen friends, Kishore Pasha, Musa Aman and Robin Milford formed the Tin Goyenda. Sometimes Georgina Parker (more commonly referred to as Jina) with her pet dog Rafi accompany them. Tin Goyenda live in Rocky Beach, a small coastal town in California, United States. They are in the same class at Rocky Beach High School and Green Hills School, though their grade is not mentioned. According to the cover pages of the original 'Three Investigators' series, the investigators are younger than 'Hardy Boys' and presumably 13–14 years old.

=== Kishore Pasha ===
Kishore Pasha, a Bangladeshi-American, is the leader of Tin Goyenda (Goyenda Prodhan). His parents died in a car accident when he was 7. It was described in the first part that the accident occurred when they were returning home from Hollywood. In the original 'The Three Investigators' series however, the character Kishore's name is 'Jupiter Jones' and nickname 'Jupe'. According to the cover pages of the original series Jupe was a 13–14 year-old white American with black hair. His father and mother were both professional ballroom dancers and died in a car accident when Jupe was 4 years old.

Kishore's father's name was Zahed Pasha. He is shown living with his uncle Rashed Pasha and aunt Maria Pasha. Mr. Pasha owns a junkyard known as Pasha Salvage Yard. Kishore is a born actor, an electronic wizard and the locomotive of the Tin Goyenda as well. He was a child actor. (In the original English series, the name of the TV series where he acted in his childhood was 'Baby Fatso', In the Bangla book 'Pagol Shongho', the name of the TV show was 'Pagol Shongho' where Kishore's character's name was 'Moturam'.) He has two dogs named 'Titu' and 'Bagha'. Obese in childhood, he maintains a strict diet. He has no interest in girls and is quite shy. He does not like to draw attention from public and likes to work behind the scenes. He has a habit of biting his lower lip when in deep thought. Through his work, he made many unusual friends such as the French art-thief Shōpan(Chopin). In the volumn-13, he is compared to Agatha Christie's hercule poirot.

=== Musa Aman ===
Musa Aman, the second detective, is an African-American (In the original series- Peter Crenshaw, nickname Pete. According to the cover pages of the original series he is a 13–14 years old black American with brown hair).

His first passion is eating. He falls victim to the experimental cooking of Nisan Jung Kim (the Vietnamese cook of Mr. Simon) who loves to cook unusual dishes. Bearing an athletic figure and great strength, he is the team muscle. Often he uses his head as a weapon to headbutt the belly of the enemy, especially to clear his way. Musa Aman can fight any living thing, but he is scared of ghosts. When excited, he sometimes utters the word 'Khaichhe' (Bengali: খাইছে) (though literally meaning eaten, here it means 'Damn it!'). Often he provides the comic relief. Musa lives with his parents: Rafat Aman, special-effect technician in a film-producing company. Musa hates to read books. He has a great passion for animals. Insects and soldier ants are attracted to him for some special element in his blood. Occasionally, he argues with the female character Jina. He has a younger cousin named Fariha. Loyalty to the team, deep respect for the teammates and occasional heroism: these qualities set Musa apart from other characters. He has faced life-threatening risks many times for helping others, including a time when he climbed a burning house to save a little boy.

=== Robin Milford ===
The ancestors of Robin Milford came to America from Ireland (In the original series- Robert Andrews, nickname Bob. According to the cover pages of the original series he is a 13–14 years old white American with golden hair). He is a nerd/ bookworm (although Kishore also reads). He is also known as the 'moving encyclopedia', he is the researcher and documentation specialist. He works part-time in the Rocky Beach Library and the leading local music company. He collects information related to their cases. The first book shows him as a skinny and short boy, but he grows taller. Like Musa Aman, he lives with his journalist parents. His father Roger Milford works for 'Los Angeles Times'. Robin is seen as an expert mountain climber, though it is mentioned that he broke his limbs several times when climbing mountains. He is a light-sleeper. He has a strong sixth sense but lacks karate skills. He is peaceful in nature, and is often found teasing Musa and others.

== Additional characters ==
=== Georgina Parker ===
Georgina Parker was first introduced in the books at Pretshadhona (Worship of Spirits) in volume 2-1. In the original series her name is 'Georgina Kirrin'. She is the daughter of famous scientist Jonnathon Parker (In the original series - 'Quentin Kirrin'). Sometimes her mother calls her "George". Because Jina's parents had high hopes for a son. But unfortunately their son, who was the first child, died immediately after birth and his name was George. (reference: Tin Goyenda volume 2-1: "Sagar Saikat"). Original series writer Blyton revealed that 'Georgina' was based on the writer herself. Georgina or George is boyish, courageous, short-tempered and loyal . She has a dog named Rafi. Jina likes teasing Musa and has a small crush on Kishore.

== Other characters ==
=== Rashed Pasha ===
Rashed Pasha is Kishore's uncle and Maria Pasha's husband. He owns a junkyard known as Pasha Salvage Yard. He initially he named the junk yard "Pasha Batil Maler Arot" in Bangla using English letters. But people failed to pronounce it correctly. So, he renamed it in English. Later in the series, he becomes a detective and makes his wife (Maria Pasha aka Kishore's aunty) the owner of the junkyard.

=== Maria Pasha ===
Maria Pasha is Kishore's aunt and Rashed Pasha's wife. Kishore, Musa and Robin call her "Meri chaci" (Meri auntie). She has no child. So, she treats Tin Goyenda as her own child and often worries about their safety. She even introduces Kishore as her own son to unknown people. She is a brave woman.

=== Davies Christopher ===
Davies Christopher is a Hollywood film producer and director (the original series-used Alfred Hitchcock, a real director. At the height of his success, his name was commercially licensed to promote several book series). He gave the Tin Goyenda their first break by giving them the assignment of finding a haunted house for his upcoming movie. Most of Tin Goyenda's cases were shown to be transformed into juvenile movies produced by Christopher. After the first case, he often calls on Tin Goyenda to solve another puzzling mystery.

=== Omar Sharif ===
Omar Sharif is an Egyptian adventure-loving pilot in his late twenties or early thirties. He was Christopher's favorite pilot. He was introduced in the books Jaladossur Dip 1, 2 (The Island of the Pirates, Part 1 and 2). Later he became Tin Goyenda's favorite Omar Bhai. He appeared in many adventures with Tin Goyenda. Later, Omar and Tin Goyenda founded a flying club private airliner in the name of OKIMURO Corporation. O for Omar, Ki for Kishore, Mu for Musa and Ro for Robin.

=== Victor Simon ===
Victor Simon is a renowned private eye/author/adventurer (In the original series- Hector Sebastien. Sebastien is a fictional writer who records the adventures of 'The Three Investigators' from their words). He is a wealthy man keeping a special relationship with the boys. He passes them cases. Sometimes Simon and Tin Goyenda work together on the same case. The first story when Tin Goyenda met him was Khora Goyenda (The lame detective).

=== Ian Fletcher ===
Ian Fletcher is the Police Chief in Rocky Beach (In the original series- Samuel Reynolds, everybody calls him 'Chief Reynolds'. He is a bulky man and a bit bald. Source: The Mystery of the Green Ghost). He gives cases to the team and praises them. He signed and gave them three green cards on which following text was written- "This certifies that the bearer is a Volunteer Junior Assistant Deputy co-operating with the police force of Rocky Beach. Any assistance given him will be appreciated."

=== Terrier Doyle (known as "Shutki Terry") ===
'Shutki' (Bengali: শুঁটকি) refers to someone very thin, in a crude sense. Terry is the arch rival of Tin Goyenda (In the original series- Skinny Norris). He is a few years older than the Tin Goyenda. He had a driver's license that he got from a state where the required age for a license was lower. When he comes to Rocky Beach he tries to prove himself better than the Tin Goyenda and irritates them. So, Tin Goyenda hates Shutki Terry. Shutki Terry has a team of his own too.

=== Harrison Wagner Fogrampercott (known as Jhamela) ===
Jhamela (Bengali: ঝামেলা) refers to troubles. This police constable is one of the leading rivals in Tin Goyenda's sequel series Tin Bondhu (The Three Mates). The rivalry began in a small village called 'Greenhills' where Robin, Musa and Fariha (Cousin of Musa) lived in their childhood. He has a bad habit of telling the word 'Jhamela' (trouble). In the book Ekhaneo Jhamela (Here's Also Trouble) he was transferred to Gobel beach.

=== William Bobrampercott ===
William Bobrampercott is the nephew of police constable Harrison Wagner Fogrampercott. He was mainly mentioned in the series Tin Bondhu. Despite his uncle's rivalry with the young detectives, he is friends with the boys. He took parts in some cases of Tin Bondhu.

=== Hanson (chauffeur of the Rolls-Royce) ===
Hanson (In the original series- Worthington) is a British chauffeur who drives the Tin Goyenda around in a Rolls-Royce. Tin Goyenda won the Rolls-Royce in contest by Rent-a-Ride for a month. As time passes, he becomes a confidant and helper in the boys' investigations

=== Dr. Moon ===
Dr. Moon is a scientist and also an enemy of Tin Goyenda. He sometimes appeared in Tin Goyenda books like Somoy Surongo (Time Tunnel) and Time Travel. He had time machines named Time Travel-1, Time Travel-2, etc.

== Headquarters ==
The headquarters of Tin Goyenda is in Pasha Salvage Yard. It is a mobile van that Rashed Pasha bought a long time ago and then forgot about. Tin Goyenda took this chance and made it their headquarters. It is hidden under junk and has multiple hidden entrances. Each entrance has a name. Sobuj Fotok Ek (English: Green Gate One), Dui Surongo (English: Two Tunnel), Sohoj Tin (English: Easy Three), Lal Kukur Char (English: Red Dog Four) are some examples.

Apart from sitting space for them, it contains a darkroom, storage room, periscope, telephone and computer.

== Rolls-Royce ==
In the first book, Tin Goyenda, or more specifically Kishore Pasha, won the use of a Rolls-Royce for 30 days in a quiz competition. This car was made for a Middle Eastern Sheikh, who rejected it. From then on, the company used it as a publicity tool. The Rolls-Royce is a large black and golden luxury vehicle with a telephone and other comforts. Tin Goyenda uses it in the first few books. When the 30 day period was over, they were no longer entitled to use it. But after finding the precious stone Roktochokkhu (The Blood Eye), its grateful owner August. August asked the company to let Tin Goyenda use the Rolls-Royce on his account. Usually Mr. Hanson, a British-American, drives the car for the company.

== Brief history ==
Tin Goyenda appeared at a time when the Bangladeshi Bengali language book market offered few juvenile detective novels. In August 1985, the first Tin Goyenda book also named Tin Goyenda caught the attention of thousands of thriller-loving young people.

The success of the first book paved the way for the sequel Konkal Dip (Skeleton Island). The third installment was Rupali Makorsha (The Silver Spider). Later a new book was published every month.

=== Sources ===
Most of the books were adaptations, mostly from western writers.

=== Authors ===
The first 40-45 stories are from Robert Arthur, Jr's The Three Investigators. These stories have David Christopher on them.

Original The Three Investigators (1964–1987) series published by Random House (world's largest general-interest trade book publisher) in English had 43 books written by Robert Arthur (10 books), William Arden whose original name was Michael Collins (13 books), Nick West (2 books), M. V. Carey or Mary Virginia Carey (15 books) and Marc Brandel (3 books). Two movies in English were made by a German-South African production house. The first movie was The Three Investigators and the Secret of Skeleton Island (2007) and then The Three Investigators and the Secret of Terror Castle (2009). These two movie plots were slightly different than the books and the updated story included technologies like GPS and mobile phones.

11 books became the next series called 'The Three Investigators Crime Busters (1989–1990)'. Two of these books were written by original series writers, one by William Arden and another one by Marc Brandel. Other writers of the 'Crime Busters' series were Megan Stine and H. William Stine, G.H. Stone, William MacCay and Peter Lerangis.

The stories which have Georgina Parker or Gina for short on them are from British author Enid Blyton's The Famous Five (1942–1963). She wrote 21 books. Television series were made in 1977 and again in 1995. The name Gina and eventually her full characteristics were based on the series. Other characters were transformed into Tin Goyenda by Hasan.

The Famous Five series included two brothers and a sister whose cousin was 'Georgina Kirrin'. These characters were transformed into the characters of Kishore, Musa & Robin. Their cousin Georgina had the dog named 'Timmy' which was called 'Ruffian or Rafi' in the 'Tin Goenda' series. And though original 'The Three Investigators' series were American stories based around Rocky Beach, California, Los Angeles. The original 'Famous Five' stories were British stories.

'Goenda Raju' series was translated from or based on 'Famous Five' series. There the Characters were Raju, Opu, Babli & Misha, three siblings and one cousin. The Goenda Raju series stories were all converted into 'Tin Gonda' books. Therefore, all of the 'Famous Five' series books appear in the Bengali Tin Goenda series.

In stories of Greenhills (a village) the three detectives are much younger and solve small cases (most of the time the police help them). In these stories Musa, Robin and Fariha (Musa's cousin) live in Greenhills. Kishore lives in Rocky Beach and has a dog named Titu. These stories are from The Five Find-Outers, another juvenile series by Enid Blyton. The first story of The Five Find-Outers,The mystery of the Burnt Cottage was adopted into Jhamela.

Like the stories from The Five Find-Outers, some other stories are based Greenhills. These stories have seven members on the team. These stories are adopted from Enid Blyton's fictional series The Secret Seven. The difference between these stories and the originals are: in these stories Kishore lives in Greenhills and they form a detective group named Lodhosh that prefers Rohossho Vedi Dol in Bengali. The seven members are: Kishore, Musa, Robin, Misha (Kishore's cousin), Anita, Doly and Bob. These stories also feature Bably, a cousin of Musa and Nina (Bably's friend) who always interrupt in their case.

Stories with Dick Curter (known as Uncle Dick) are adopted from Enid Blyton's juvenile series The Adventure Series.

Enid Blyton's other series named The Faraway Tree was adopted into some Tin Goyenda books. Shamsuddin Nawab wrote some short stories based on this series' first novel The Enchanted Wood, leaving some magical creatures from the original novel out from the adopted one. However, these books were highly criticized by Tin Goyenda fans.

Christopher Pike's Spooksville series of 24 books were adopted into 24 Tin Goyenda horror stories. These stories include Roda and the stories are based in Death City, Roda's hometown. On the first story Rashed Pasha buys a house in the city and in the sequels Tin Goyenda often vacation there. The city is full of mystery and the paranormal. These stories feature another character named Tom, the friendly and knowledgeable homeless ex-mayor of Death City and a town witch. Christopher Pike's books are young adult fiction, horror and vampire stories as well. Pike wrote 75 books from 1985 to 2007.

Hasan drew others stories from other juvenile English series. The most notable one is The Hardy Boys. Romhorshok or Reza-Shuza book series' made the boys a little older than in the original The Three Investigators series and they participated in seemingly more dangerous missions. Romhorshok' series books were later converted into Tin Goyenda books, so Bengali Tin Goenda series has Hardy Boys stories in it. From 1927 to 2014, 489 books were published in the 'Hardy Boys' books series.

Hasan also adapted Tipu Kibria's Kishore Horror series, but this ended due to less popularity. After writing for more than a decade, Hasan departed from Sheba Prokashoni and Shamsuddin Nawab took up the writing. In August 2015, on the occasion of Tin Goyenda's 30 year anniversary, it was revealed in Kishor Alo (a monthly youngsters' magazine), that Shamsuddin Nawab is actually Qazi Shahnur Hossain; who is Qazi Anwar Hussain's son.
