= Sanaul Huq =

Bangladeshi poet, translator, and civil servant (1924–1993)

- সানাউল হক
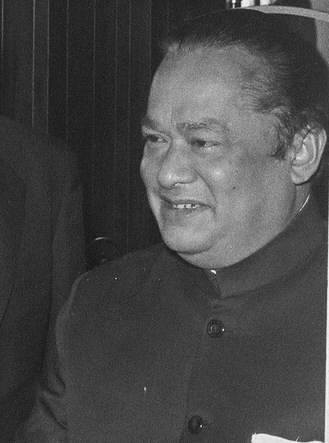
- Huq at the headquarters of the European Commission in Brussels (1973)

Ambassador of Bangladesh to Belgium and the European Union
- In office 15 May 1973 – 30 December 1976
- Preceded by: Position created
- Succeeded by: Abul Ahsan

Personal details
- Born: Al-Mamun Sanaul Huq; 23 May 1924 Brahmanbaria, Bengal Presidency, British India
- Died: 4 February 1993 (aged 68) Dhaka, Bangladesh
- Parents: Zahurul Huq (father); Syeda Husaini Begum (mother)
- Relatives: Motaher Hussain Chowdhury (uncle)
- Education: University of Dhaka

Sanaul Huq (23 May 1924 – 4 February 1993) was a Bangladeshi poet, translator, and civil servant. He had served as the first ambassador of Bangladesh to Belgium and the European Union during 1973–1976.

== Early life and education ==
Sanaul Huq was born in Chowra village, Brahmanbaria District to Zahurul Huq and Syeda Husaini Begum. His maternal uncle Motaher Hussain Chowdhury was a poet and writer. Huq matriculated in 1939 from Annada School in Brahmanbaria, completed his intermediate examinations in 1941 from Dhaka Intermediate College (now Dhaka College) and his BA Honors (economics) in 1944 and MA in 1945 from the University of Dhaka. He also earned his BL degree in 1946.

== Career ==
Huq served as a faculty member at the department of economics at the University of Dhaka from 29 November 1946 until 30 June 1948. He then joined the Pakistan Civil Service as a civil servant.

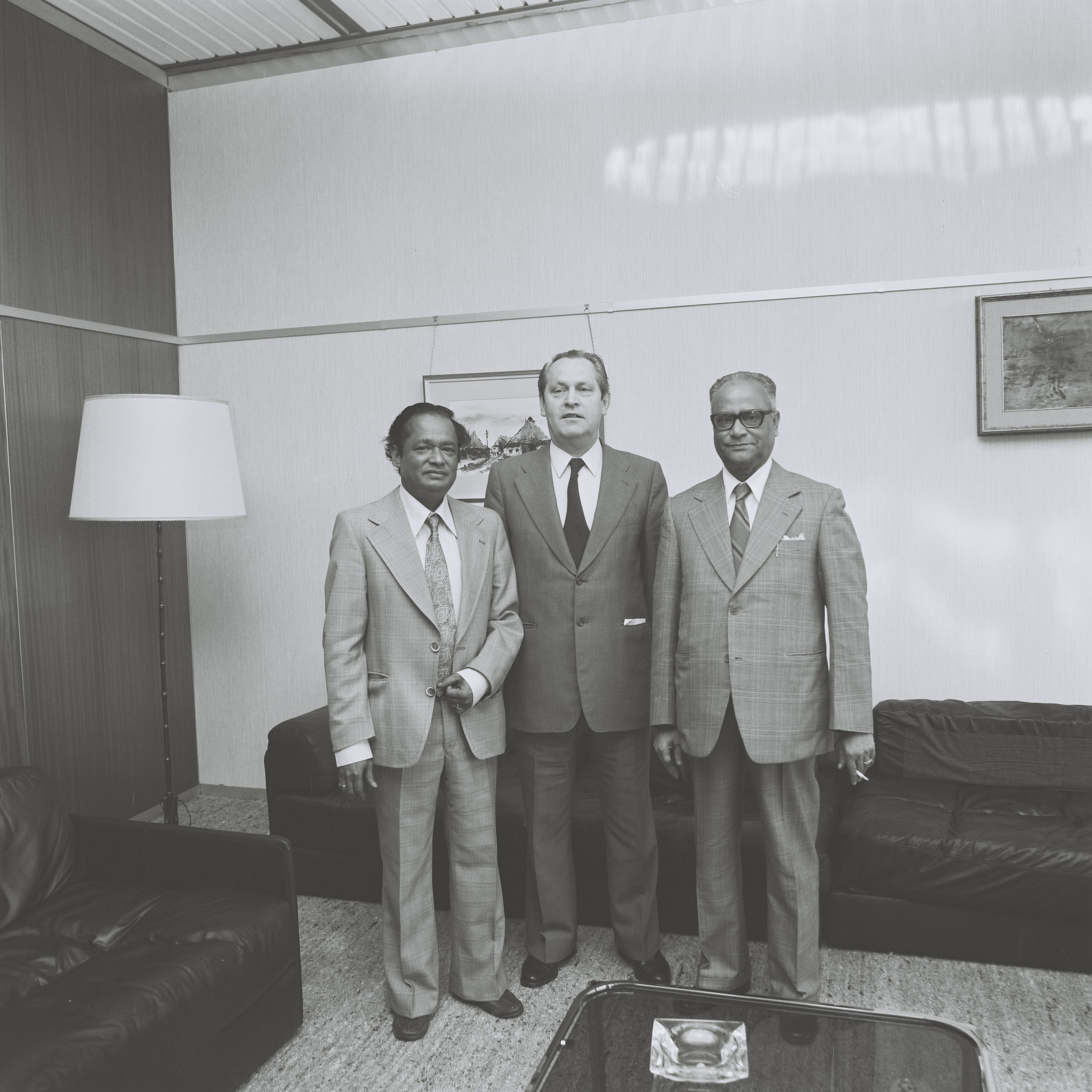
Huq with Pierre Lardinois and Mirza Nurul Huda in Brussels (1976)

After the independence of Bangladesh, he was appointed as the first ambassador of Bangladesh to Belgium by the then Prime Minister of Bangladesh Sheikh Mujibur Rahman on 15 May 1973.

During the incident of assassination of Sheikh Mujibur Rahman in Dhaka on 15 August 1975, two of his daughters, Sheikh Hasina and Sheikh Rehana, Hasina's husband M. A. Wazed Miah and their children were staying as guests at Huq's residence in Brussels. On 12 August, they had arrived at Huq's residence from Bonn and attended a candlelight dinner on the 14th. Upon hearing Rahman's death on the 15th, Huq called Humayun Rashid Choudhury, the then ambassador of Bangladesh to West Germany, and requested him to take the guests back to Germany immediately. Eventually, the guests were transported from Brussels to Aachen on the Belgium–Germany border. Chowdhury then sent two cars to Aachen to bring Hasina and family to his residence in Königswinter.

Huq served as the ambassador until 30 December 1976.

== Family ==
Huq had two sons, Irtefa Mamun and Sumon Ifat Mamun, and three daughters, Tasnim Jafrullah, Trina Rubaiya Mamun and Saida Hussaini Mamun. In April 2023, the District and Sessions Judge Court in Dhaka ordered investigation into the family accusing of fraud related to the sale of a property in Gulshan. Huq had possessed land properties in Dhanmondi and Gulshan during the military rule of Muhammad Ayub Khan in the 1960s. The court suspected that the family had deceived the court by not revealing the identity of their father.

== Works ==
- Nodi O Manusher Kavita (1956)
- Sombhoba Onannya (1962)
- Surya Onyotor (1963)
- Bichurna Arshite (1968)
- Ekti Ichcha Sahasra Paley (1973)
- Kal Samakal

== Awards ==
- Bangla Academy Literary Award (1964)
- UNESCO Award (1965)
- Lekhok Sangho Prize (1965)
- Ekushey Padak (1983)
- Alokto Sahitya Prize (1985)
