= Fahmida Khatun (singer) =

Bangladeshi singer

- Occupation: singer
- Father: Qazi Motahar Hossain
- Relatives: Qazi Anwar Hussain (brother); Sanjida Khatun (sister); Qazi Mahbub Hussain (brother)

Fahmida Khatun is a Bangladeshi Rabindra Sangeet singer. She was awarded Shilpakala Padak in 2014.

== Early life ==
Khatun was born to Qazi Motahar Hossain, a scientist and National Professor of Bangladesh. Her siblings include Sanjida Khatun, Qazi Mahbub Hussain and Qazi Anwar Hussain.

Khatun started off as a dancer. She later turned to singing. As a school student, she took lessons in classical music at home. Her mentors were Ustad Munir Hussain in classical and Sanjida Khatun, Kalim Sharafi, Abdul Ahad in Tagore songs.

== Career ==
In 1956, Khatun rendered songs of the mother character in Chandalika, a dance drama. She rendered "Ami Tomar Shongey Bedhechhi Amar Praan" in the film Dharapat, the first Rabindra Sangeet song used in a film made in the then East Pakistan.

On December 26, 1964, the second day of the inauguration of Bangladesh Television, Khatun and Zahedur Rahim sang the first Rabindra Sangeet on the television screen. The song was titled "Tori Amar Hothat Dube Jai".
