= The Muazzin =

The Muazzin was a monthly journal published in the early 20th century from Kolkata. It was the official mouthpiece of the Khademul Insan Samity. It started out as a quarterly journal but soon changed to monthly.

== History ==
The Muazzin was the official journal of Khademul Ensan Samity established in 1928. Mohammad Yusuf Ali Chowdhury was the president of the organization. It was printed from Ambika Press. The main patron of the journal was the son of the Zamidar of Faridpur, Moulvi Moyazzem Hossain. Its aim was to encourage literary traditions in the Bengali Muslim community. In 1931, it established a branch in Kolkata. The journal launched a crusade against vagrancy and begging. It provided training and rehabilitation to beggars. Notable contributors to the publication include Jasimuddin, Kazi Nazrul Islam, Muhammad Shahidullah, and Qazi Motahar Hossain.
