= Khairul Anam Shakil =

- খায়রুল আনাম শাকিল
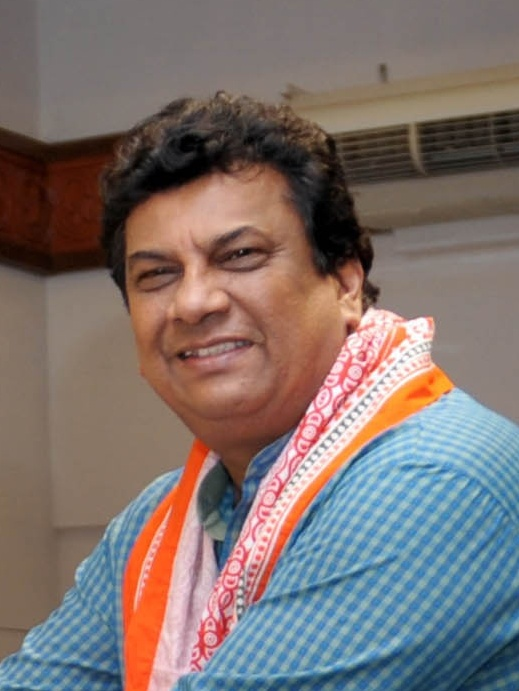
- Shakil in 2019.
- Education: Leeds University
- Occupations: Singer, academic
- Spouses: Masuda Anam Kolpana
- Children: 2
- Parents: Mohammad Abul Khayer (father); Nilufar Khayer (mother)
- Website: khairulanamshakil.com

Khairul Anam Shakil is a Bangladeshi singer of Nazrul Sangeet genre. He was awarded Ekushey Padak in 2019 and Nazrul Award in 2017 by the government of Bangladesh. He was appointed by the government as the chairman of the trustee board chairman of Kabi Nazrul Institute in May 2022.

== Background ==
Shakil's father, Mohammad Abul Khayer, was an Awami League MLA of erstwhile East Pakistan (now Bangladesh). His mother, Nilufar Khayer, was a student of Rabindra Sangeet in Bulbul Academy of Fine Arts, and was involved with Chhayanaut. Shakil graduated from Leeds University in industrial engineering in 1984. He took music lessons from his uncle Mahmudur Rahman Benu, Narayan Chandra Basak, Ustad Mohammad Sageeruddin Khan, Sheikh Lutfur Rahman, Sohrab Hossain and Anjalee Ray.

== Career ==
Shakil released his debut album, Meghey Meghey Andho, in 1996.

As of April 2024, Shakil has been serving as a vice president of Chhayanaut Cultural Organisation. He is a faculty member of the Department of Music at the University of Dhaka. As of March 2024, he serves as the General Secretary of Bangladesh Nazrul Sangeet Sangstha.

== Awards ==
- 6th Channeli Music Award- Best Nazrul Singer
- 10th Channeli Music Award- Best Nazrul Singer
- Nazrul Award by Jatiya Kabi Kazi Nazrul Islam University (2016)
- Nazrul Award by Kabi Nazrul Institute (2017)
- Ekushey Padak (2019)

== Personal life ==
Shakil is married to Masuda Anam Kolpana, with two sons Zareef Anam and Wasif Anam. Masuda is also a notable Nazrul shongeet singer. They released a few duet music albums including Ektuku Chhoya Lagey (2017). They released their first Rabindra Sangeet album, Ektuku Chhoya Lagey in 2017. Shakil is the nephew of filmmaker Tareque Masud and the brother-in-law of filmmaker Badal Rahman.

== Works ==
Single albums

1. Meghey Meghey Andho (1996)
2. Shadh Jagey Mone (1998)
3. Gobhir Nisheethey Ghum Bhengey Jaye (1999)
4. Pashaner Bhangaley Ghum (2001)
5. Shyamla Boron (2007)
6. Chhilo Chand Megher Porey
7. Gaan Guli Mor (2009)
8. Shei Mukh Porey Mone (2009)
9. Gobhir Nishitho Ghume (2013)

Duet albums

1. Mora Aar Janamey (2007)
2. Mrittika (2008)
3. Shonar Kathi Rupor Kathi (2008)
4. Ektuku Chhoya Lagey (2017)
