= Sanjida Khatun =

Bangladeshi musicologist (1933–2025)

- সন্‌‌জীদা খাতুন
- Pronunciation: [ˈsɔnd͡ʒid̪a ˈkʰat̪un]
- Born: 4 April 1933
- Died: 25 March 2025 (aged 91); Dhaka, Bangladesh
- Education: Ph.D.
- Alma mater: University of Dhaka
- Known for: President of Chhayanaut
- Spouse: Waheedul Haq
- Children: Apala Farhat; Partha Tanveer; Ruchira Tabassum
- Father: Qazi Motahar Hossain
- Relatives: Qazi Anwar Hussain (brother); Fahmida Khatun (sister); Qazi Mahbub Hussain (brother)

Sanjida Khatun (Bengali: সন্‌‌জীদা খাতুন, Bengali pronunciation: [ˈsɔnd͡ʒid̪a ˈkʰat̪un]; 4 April 1933 – 25 March 2025) was a Bangladeshi musicologist. She was awarded Bangla Academy Literary Award in 1998 and Ekushey Padak in 1991 by the government of Bangladesh and Padma Shri, India's fourth highest civilian award, in 2021.

== Life and career ==
Khatun completed her bachelor's in Bengali literature from the University of Dhaka in 1955. She earned her MA degree in Bangla language from Visva Bharati University in 1957.

After teaching at Eden Mohila College and Carmichael College Khatun joined the faculty of the University of Dhaka to teach Bengali literature. Khatun was one of the founders of Bangladesh Mukti Sangrami Shilpi Sangstha during the Liberation War in 1971 and Chhayanaut in the early 1960s. She served as the president of Chhayanaut.

Khatun was married to Waheedul Haq and had three children: Apala Farhat Naved (d. 2011), Partha Tanveer Naved, and Ruchira Tabassum Naved.

Khatun died in Dhaka on 25 March 2025, at the age of 91.

== Awards ==
- 2021 – Padma Shri, by the Government of India
- 2020 - Bidyastu Academic Award, by the Government of West Bengal
- 2019 - BRAC Bank-Samakal Literary Award for her essay collection Nazrul Manas
- 2012 – Deshikottoma by Visva-Bharati University
- 2010 – Rabindra Award
- 2010 – Lifetime Achievement Award by 5th Citycell-Channel I Music Awards
- 1998 – Bangla Academy Literary Award
- 1991 – Ekushey Padak
- 1988 - Title of ‘Rabindra Tattvacharya'
- Kabi Jasimuddin Award

== Contribution to the liberation war ==
At the beginning of the Liberation War, she travelled from Rangpur to Dhaka. From there, she moved to the village of Zirab in Savar and then crossed into India through the Cumilla border. A few cultural activists accompanied her. They stayed in Agartala, India, for some time before entering Kolkata on 5 May 1971. There, she began uniting cultural activists in support of the Liberation War.

== Notable books ==
Khatun wrote a total of 16 books. Notable among them are:

- Kabi Satyendranath Dutta (Poet Satyendranath Dutta)
- Rabindrasangeeter Bhavasampad (The Thematic Wealth of Rabindra Sangeet)
- Dhwani Theke Kabita (From Sound to Poetry)
- Atit Diner Smriti (Memories of Bygone Days)
- Rabindranath: Bibidha Sandhan (Rabindranath: Various Explorations)
- Dhwanir Katha O Abritir Katha (The Story of Sound and Recitation)
- Swadhinatar Abhijatra (The Journey to Independence)
- Sahitya Katha O Sanskriti Katha (Discourse on Literature and Culture)
- Janani Janmabhumi (Mother and Motherland)
- Rabindranath Ebong Rabindranath (Rabindranath and Rabindranath)
- Shantiniketaner Dinguli (Days at Santiniketan)
- Jibanbritta (The Circle of Life)
