= Annada Government High School =

Coordinates: 23.9775°N 91.1073°E

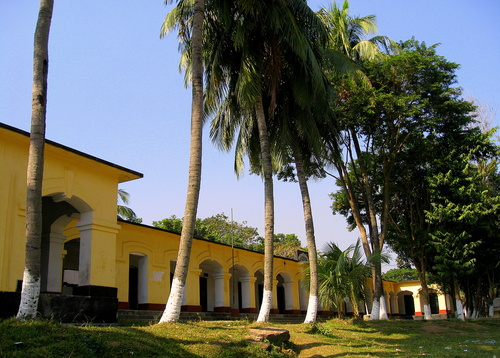

Location
- Haldarpara, Brahmanbaria; Bangladesh

Information
- Type: Public
- Motto: "Bidya Onneshone Agomon, Sheba Brote Nirghomon" বিদ্যা অন্বেষণে আগমন সেবা ব্রতে নির্গমন।
- Established: 1875
- Founder: Raja Roy Bahadur Annada Prashad Roy
- School district: Brahmanbaria District
- Principal: Md. Zakir Hossain Sarkar
- Faculty: 45
- Grades: 1st to 10th Grade
- Enrollment: ~2500
- Colors: white and navy blue
- Yearbook: Dishari/orunav
- Website: http://www.annadaghs.edu.bd/

Annada Government High School (Bengali: অন্নদা সরকারি উচ্চ বিদ্যালয়) is a government secondary school for boys, in Brahmanbaria, Bangladesh. The school was named after Annada Prashad Roy who was a landlord of Kolkata. The school operates under the Cumilla Education Board.

The school lies in the heart of Brahmanbaria town, the administrative headquarters of the district of the same name. It is the oldest and one of the largest schools in Brahmanbaria District. As of 2006, enrollment was 2,250.

== History ==
The school started out in 1860 as an aided Anglo-vernacular school. It was upgraded to a high school in 1875 with the help of Annada Choron Roy of Cassimbazar and zamindar of Sarail Estate. The founding headmaster was Babu Jogesh Chandra Sarker.

The school was nationalised on 1 May 1968. Babu Binode Bihari was a student of Annada Govt High School. He stood first in the matriculation Examination held under the Kolkata University. Later Dr. Wahiduddin Mahmud stood first in the mid-sixties and Md. Jehad Uddin stood first under Cumilla Board in 1991 from this school in the matriculation/SSC examination.

In February 2009, Mrs. Farida Nazmeen joined as headmaster and she has been the headmaster until 2025. From 2025 Md. Zakir Hossain Sarkar was given the responsibility of the Headmaster.

== Notable alumni ==
- Sanaul Huq, a poet and civil servant
- Humayun Kabir, former state minister for health
- Al Mahmud, poet
- Wahiduddin Mahmud, an economist and a past member of the Caretaker government
- Syed Abdul Hadi, award-winning Bangladeshi singer Together they have three daughters.
- Adwaita Mallabarman, author of A River Called Titash, matriculated in 1933
- Abdul Quadir, poet, essayist, and journalist, matriculated in 1923
- M Harunur Rashid, former professor and head of the department of English at Jahangirnagar University
- Atique Islam, current vice chancellor of North South University and professor.
