= Murtaza Kabir Murad =

Bangladeshi flutist

- Occupation: Flutist

Murtaza Kabir Murad is a Bangladeshi flutist. He is also a contributor of Easy Flute School youtube channel, which proposes free lessons to learn Bansuri instrument.

== Early life ==
Murad was born to Ali Ahmed and Latifa Ahmed. In 1985, he started his musical career by taking tabla lessons from Khandaker Khairul Anam. He later learned how to play the flute from Alauddin. During 1992–1999, he got lessons in flute from Ustad Shamsur Rahman in Dhaka. He was listed A-grade flute player on Bangladesh Television and Bangladesh Betar.

He authored the book "Shahaj Bashi Sheekkhya", the first flute learning book in Bangladesh. As of 2017, Murad is serving as a teacher in the Flute department at Chhayanaut.
