= Mohammad Abul Khayer =

Bangladeshi politician, freedom fighter and social worker

- মোহাম্মদ আবুল খায়ের
- Born: Bengal Presidency, British India
- Occupation: Politician
- Awards: Independence Day Award (2014)

Mohammad Abul Khayer was a renowned politician, freedom fighter and social worker of Bangladesh. He recorded the 7 March Speech of Bangabandhu Sheikh Mujibur Rahman. In 2014, he was awarded the "Independence and Independence War Liberation Award" for his unique general contribution to the Bangladesh Liberation War.

== Personal life ==
Khayer was an Awami League MLA of erstwhile East Pakistan (now Bangladesh). Khairul Anam Shakil, Nazrul Sangeet singer, is his son.

== Awards ==
In 2014, Khayer was posthumously awarded the Independence Day Award, the highest civilian honour, for outstanding contribution to the country's independence movement and liberation war.
