= Masud Rana (1974 film) =

Bangladeshi crime action film

- Directed by: Masud Parvez
- Screenplay by: Qazi Anwar Hussain
- Based on: Bismoron by Qazi Anwar Hussain
- Produced by: Masud Parvez
- Starring: Sohel Rana; Olivia Gomez; Kabori; Golam Mustafa; Khalil Ullah Khan; Fateh Lohani
- Narrated by: Masud Rana
- Cinematography: Abdul Latif Bacchu
- Edited by: Bashir Hossain
- Music by: Azad Rahman
- Distributed by: Parvez Films
- Release date: 24 May 1974
- Running time: 143 mins
- Country: Bangladesh
- Language: Bengali

Masud Rana is a Bangladeshi crime action film directed by Masud Parvez, it is released in 1974. Masud Rana is a fictional character created by Qazi Anwar Hussain and published under the banner of Sheba Prokashoni. Since 1966, it has published over 400 books on this character. It was based on the story of Bismoron (lit. Amnesia), a novel of Masud Rana series, which in turn is based on Strictly for Cash.. by James Hadley Chase. This is the debut film of Sohel Rana.

The film stars Sohel Rana in the role of Masud Rana, Olivia and Kabori, Golam Mostafa, Khalil, Fateh Lohani and Razzak as a guest actor.

== Plot ==
Masud Rana, who was visiting Sri Lanka, gets into trouble. While fleeing with helper Rita and her husband Kumar, they get involved in a road accident, where Rana loses his memory. Rita, a newly widowed woman, conspires with Rana to illegally occupy her husband's property.

== Cast ==
- Sohel Rana - Masud Rana
- Kabori - Sabita
- Olivia - Rita
- Golam Mustafa - Hulugal
- Khalil - Natraj Hikka
- Fateh Lohani - Raghunath
- Saifuddin - Police officer
- Razzak - Club singer (as guest appearance)
- Khan Zainul - Pillai of Tirugansampandamutinina
- Sultana - Office secretary
- Jabed Rohim
- Juber
- Bibek
- Gui
- Babul
- Robiul - hospital janitor
- Jashim
- Noalin
- Jhuma Mukherjee

== Production ==
=== Development ===
In 1973, the plan to making a film based on Masud Rana novel was made by Sohel Rana. For that purpose, an advertisement was published in newspaper for main character of the film. A character election committee was made. Members of the committee were Ahmed Zaman Chowdhury S.M Shafi, Sumita Devi and producer Sohel Rana. After some days Ahmed Zaman Chowdhury of the committee, who was film journalist of that time suggested that Sohel Rana should be Masud Rana of the film. In that time he acted as actor, producer and director of the film.

=== Filming ===
The story set in Bangladesh and Sri Lanka. Most of the scenes of the film are shot in Cox's Bazar, especially for Sri Lankan parts. Remaining scenes of the film are shot in TSC, DU and Bangladesh Atomic Energy Commission, Dhaka.

== Music ==
Masud Rana

Soundtrack album by Sabina Yasmin, Anjuman Ara Begum, Khurshid Alam, Selina Azad
- Released: 1974
- Genre: Film music
- Language: Bengali
- Producer: Azad Rahman

Azad Rahman has directed and composed the music for Masud Rana. Sabina Yasmin, Anjuman Ara Begum, Khurshid Alam and Selina Azad sang the songs of the film.

Masud Rana Soundtrack – Track listing
No.	Title	Lyrics	Singers	Length
1.	"O Darling"	Azad Rahman	Sabina Yasmin
2.	"Monero ronge rangabo (Female)"	Azad Rahman	Selina Azad	4:34
3.	"O Rana Ogo Shona"	Ahmed Zaman Chowdhury	Anjuman Ara Begum	3:40
4.	"Loke bole bhalobesona"	Azad Rahman	Sabina Yasmin
5.	"Monero ronge rangabo (Male)"	Azad Rahman	Khurshid Alam

== Awards ==
Award Title	Category	Awardee	Result	Ref
Bachsas Awards	Best screenplay writer	Qazi Anwar Hussain	Won	
Bachsas Awards	Best dialogue	Qazi Anwar Hussain	Won	
