= Qazi Motahar Hossain =

Bangladeshi writer and scientist (1897–1981)

- কাজী মোতাহার হোসেন
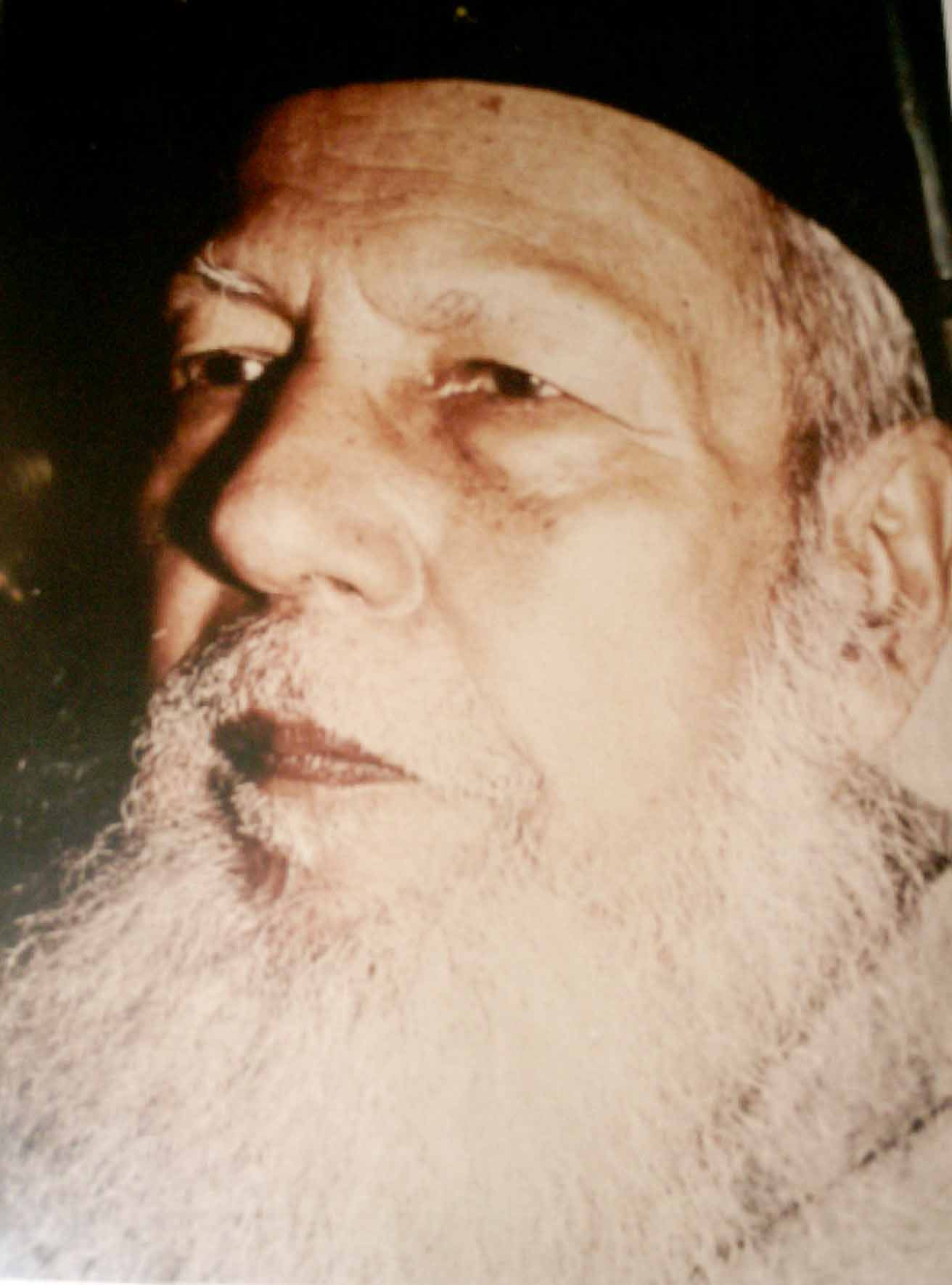
- Born: 30 July 1897; Kushtia District, Bengal Presidency, British India
- Died: 9 October 1981 (aged 84); Dhaka, Bangladesh
- Education: Presidency College, Calcutta; Rajshahi College; Dhaka College
- Organization: Muslim Shahitya Samaj
- Spouse: Sajeda Khatun
- Children: Qazi Anwar Hussain; Jobaida Mirza; Sanjida Khatun; Fahmida Khatun; Qazi Mahbub Hussain
- Parent(s): Qazi Gaohar Uddin Ahmed (father); Tasirunnesa (mother)

Qazi Motahar Hossain (30 July 1897 – 9 October 1981) was a Bangladeshi writer, scientist, statistician, chess player, and journalist.

Hossain was a pioneer educationalist of Bangladesh. He did original research in statistics and pioneered its education in Bangladesh both as a faculty and administrator. As one of the early faculties of University of Dhaka, he was vigorously active in the cultural circles that grew around it. As a Dhaka-centric literary figure in late British India, a period marked by communality and religious sentiment, Hossain and his literary group Shikha distinguished themselves as proponents of communal harmony and rationalism. He was among the sceptical intellectuals who warned of the consequences of the short-lived state of Pakistan. On several occasions, he vocally criticized Pakistani government policies, most importantly on the state language question.

== Early life and education ==
Hossain was born into the Qazi family of Bagmara to Qazi Gawharuddin and Tasirunnesa, at his maternal home, Lakshmipur village, in Kushtia District, in the then British India. His family had arrived in Mughal Bengal from Western Asia during the reign of Shah Jahangir, his ancestors were designated as the judges of the court of Delhi, hence the name of the clan is "Qazi." He passed his childhood years at his father's village Bagmara in Rajbari, a district adjacent to Kushtia. He received his earliest education from his father and from the village primary school.

Hossain entered Kushtia High School, distant from his home, for Secondary studies. During his time in Kushtia, Hossain, coming from a household with lesser income, supported himself by various scholarships, lodged at nearby homes as house tutors and later settled at a hostel. Among the teachers, he specially later recalled Jyotindranath Roy and Jatindra Mohan Biswas. During his years at the school, Jyotindranath Roy, an accomplished teacher of Mathematics and Sciences, laid Hossain's foundation in algebra, geometry, conic section and mechanics. Mr. Roy, recognizing Hossain's interest in mathematics, introduced the mechanics course solely for him. In 1915, Hossain passed Entrance from there.

After passing entrance, already his interest in Science and Mathematics confirmed, Hossain went to Presidency College in Kolkata for I Sc. There he was highly impressed by eminent teachers like Praphulla Chandra Ghosh (English), Mr. Sterling (English), Prafulla Chandra Roy (chemistry). He, however, transferred himself to Rajshahi College, from where he completed his I Sc in 1917, in the middle of the academic year. In his college years, beside his studies, Hossain excelled in sports like football, tennis, etc.

In 1917, Hossain arrived in Dhaka, his first visit to the town where he would spend rest of his life, and got admitted to Dhaka College for his B A in Mathematics and Physics. Here he found W. A. Jenkins (Physics), Wrangler Bhupati Mohan Sen (Mathematics), Bankim Das Banerjee (Mathematics) and others as teachers. In 1919, he was awarded BA (honors) from this college. Hossain passed M A in physics in 1921 from the same college.

In 1921, the University of Dhaka, was founded, where Hossain would spend the rest of his life, serving various roles; that year, Hossain, still a student of M. A. at Dhaka College, preparing for final exams, joined the newly founded university as demonstrator (junior lecturer) of physics. The same year, prominent physicist Satyendra Nath Bose joined the university as a reader of physics; Hossain got intimate with Bose as colleague and Bose also quickly recognized Hossain's genius. During his preparation of M A examination, Hossain recalled, Bose provided critical inputs; their co-operation would continue in later years and Bose would leave formative influence on Hossain's career.

Bose, now head of the department of physics, encouraged Hossain to pursue higher study in statistics, a subject only getting its foothold in India, under premier Indian statistician, Prasanta Chandra Mahalanobis. Hossain accepted the offer and travelled to Calcutta, Bose himself accompanying him to introduce Hossain to Mahalanobis, to study at Mahalanobis's newly founded Indian Statistical Institute. Hossain returned to Dhaka, in 1938, with a diploma in statistics from Indian Statistical Institute and pioneered the subject in Bangladesh.

Upon returning from Indian Statistical Institute, Hossain concentrated on statistics, both as an educator and a self-taught researcher at University of Dhaka. While at Indian Statistical Institute, Hossain learned about balanced incomplete block design, and then endeavoured a thesis, under informal supervision of Bose, who was working on related topics then: counting possibility of certain balanced incomplete block design configurations by trial method. He received a doctorate for this work.

== Career ==
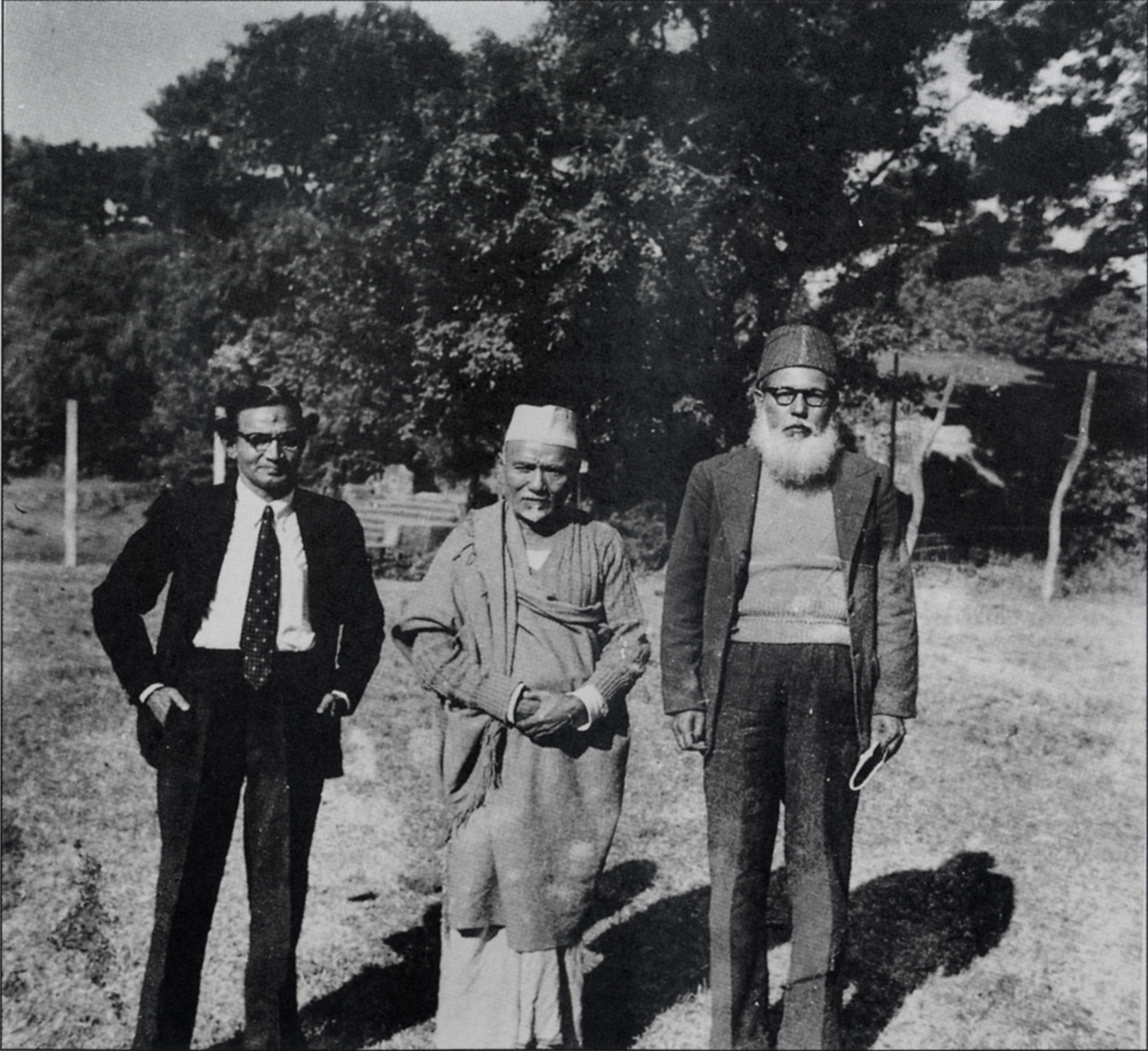
Hossain (right) with Abbasuddin Ahmed and Allauddin Khan (1955)

=== Teaching ===
Qazi Motahar Hossain joined the newly established University of Dhaka in 1921, still a student of M A at Dhaka College, as demonstrator of physics. Two years later, in 1923, he was promoted to assistant-lecturer.

Spearheaded by Hossain, University of Dhaka introduced Masters in Statistics, in 1948; Hossain proudly reminisced that University of Dhaka preceded the much older Presidency College Calcutta in this particular course. He retired from Dhaka University in 1961.

Hossain founded the Institute of Statistical Research and Training (ISRT), University of Dhaka, in 1964, and served as founder-director until 1966.

University of Dhaka appointed him Professor Emeritus in 1969. In 1975, after the liberation of Bangladesh, he was appointed the National Professor of Bangladesh, the position he decorated until his death, in 1981. He was a founder fellow of Bangladesh Academy of Sciences.

=== Activism ===
In the 1920s and 1930s a Dhaka-based literary organization, Muslim Sahitya Samaj, comprising mainly Bengali-Muslim intellectuals, initiated a movement called Buddhir Mukti Andolon (Freedom of thought movement). Hossain, through his friend Kazi Abdul Odud, got involved. Unlike the contemporary literary atmosphere of Bengal, mainly dominated by religious partisan spirit, Muslim Sahitya Samaj and their proceeding Shikha upheld values like rationalism, communal harmony, religious tolerance. Though unpopular among the masses, the Shikha group proved to be distinctively liberal and radical: they even went as far as criticizing the Caliphate system, a very unusual and bold feat during that time. Hossain edited two issues of Shikha. He wrote for The Muazzin, the journal of Khademul Insan Samity.

Within few years of Pakistan's formation, the nation's opinion got divided over the state language question. Hossain defended the case of Bangla among other leading intellectuals.

=== Chess ===
An accomplished chess player, Motahar Hossain was the all India chess champion seven times. He took the lead organizing chess in Bangladesh. He founded the All Pakistan National Chess Federation in 1969. After independence, he established Bangladesh Daba Sangha, which became the Bangladesh Chess Federation in 1974.

== Family and personal life ==
In 1920, still a student, Hossain married Sajeda Khatun. They had eleven children together – seven daughters, Zobaida Khatun, Obaida Khatun, Khurshida Khatun, Zaheda Khatun, Sanjida Khatun, Fahmida Khatun, Mahmuda Khatun and four sons, Qazi Anwar Hussain, Qazi Mahbub Hossain, and two died in childhood.

== Death and legacy ==
He died in Dhaka on 9 October 1981.

A postage stamp was published by Bangladesh Postal Department to respect his contributions.

== Works ==
- Shanchayan (1937)
- Nazrul Kabya Porichiti (Introduction to Nazrul's Poetry) (1955)
- Gonit Shastrer Itihas (History of Mathematics) (1970)
- Alok Bigyan (Optics) (1974)
- Nirbachito Probondho (Collected Essays) (1976)

He contributed to the implementation of logic, lucidity and simplicity of language and clarity in his writings. His first published book Shancharan was praised by Rabindranath Tagore. Bangla Academy has published his complete works in four volumes.

He had also given many speeches in many occasions and written many biographical notes. A collection of his eighteen biographical essays was published in 2004 under the title Smritikatha by Qazi Motahar Hossain Foundation. The foundation has also reprinted his Gonit Shastrer Itihas in the same year.

== Awards ==
- Bangla Academy Literary Award (1966)
- Honorary DSc from Dhaka University (1974)
- Nasir Uddin Swarna Padak (Golden Plaque) (1977)
- Swadhinota Dibas Purashkar (Independence Day Award) (1979)
- Mukta Dhara Shahitya Purashkar (1980)
