= Qazi Anwar Hussain =

Bangladeshi writer (1936–2022)

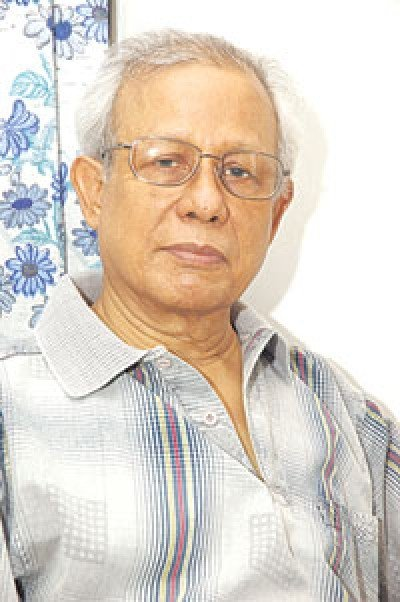
- Born: 19 July 1936; Dhaka, Bengal Province, British India
- Died: 19 January 2022 (aged 85); Dhaka, Bangladesh
- Other names: Bidyut Mitra, Shamsuddin Nawab
- Education: University of Dhaka (MA)
- Spouse: Farida Yasmin (m. 1962)
- Children: 3
- Father: Qazi Motahar Hossain
- Relatives: Sanjida Khatun (sister); Fahmida Khatun (sister)

Qazi Anwar Hussain (19 July 1936 – 19 January 2022) was a Bangladeshi writer of spy thrillers, detective novels, and adventure-based literature, many of which were adaptations or heavily influenced by foreign works.

== Early life and education ==
Qazi Shamsuddin Anwar Hussain was born on 19 July 1936 to Qazi Motahar Hossain, a scientist and writer. His sisters included the singers Sanjida Khatun and Fahmida Khatun. He matriculated from St. Gregory's School in 1952. He studied Bengali literature and language, earning a bachelor's degree from Jagannath College, and a master's degree from the University of Dhaka in 1981.

== Career ==
Hussain's most notable publication was the spy-thriller series Masud Rana. As of 2009, the series comprised 389 books, most of them ghostwritten for him.

=== Sheba Prokashoni ===
In 1963, Hussain established the publishing house Segunbagan Prakashani. By 1966 it was renamed Sheba Prokashoni.

== Personal life and death ==
Hussain married the singer Farida Yasmin in 1962. They had two sons, Qazi Maimur and Qazi Shahnur, and a daughter, Shahrin Sonia. Shahrin died from cancer in 2014.

In October 2021, Hussain was diagnosed with prostate cancer. He died on 19 January 2022 at the age of 85 while receiving treatment at BIRDEM, Dhaka.

== Works ==
=== Masud Rana books ===
The Masud Rana (fictional character) series follows the adventures of Rana, a former major in the Bangladesh Army who operates as a spy, conducting missions around the world. His superior is Major General Rahat Khan of Bangladesh Counter Intelligence, and Rana works under the jurisdiction of the Rana Agency. Hussain published 321 stories in 468 books within the series.

=== Kuasha series ===
Anwar's other famous work is Kuasha series of detective/adventure books, which consists of 51 stories in 80 books.

=== Other ===
Non-fiction

- Shothik Niyome Lekhapora (The Right Way of Read Writing)
- Bayam: Dhumpan Tyag E Attoshommohon (Exercise: Self-hypnosis to Quit Smoking)
- Khali Haate Attorokkha (Free-hand Self Defense)
- Mon Niontron (Mind Control)
- Atma Unnayan (Self Development)
- Jonopriyota (Popularity)

== Awards ==
| Award Title | Category | Movie | Result | Ref |
|---|---|---|---|---|
| Bachsas Awards | Best screenplay writer | Masud Rana | Won | |
| Bachsas Awards | Best dialogue | Masud Rana | Won | |
