= Sheba Prokashoni =

Book publisher in Bangladesh

Sheba Prokashoni (Bengali: সেবা প্রকাশনী) is a publishing house in Dhaka, Bangladesh. It was founded by Qazi Anwar Hussain. Its books are aimed at young Bangladeshi readers, and include translations of Western literary classics into the Bengali language.

== History ==
Sheba Prokashoni was founded in May, 1963 by Qazi Anwar Hussain. Its name may have derived from the first syllables of Shegun Bagan, now renamed as Shegun Bagicha, the neighbourhood of Dhaka city where its offices are located. The literal meaning of the Bengali word "Sheba" is "service."

Sheba's focus, from its inception, has been to produce mass-market popular Bengali paperbacks that are both attractively-written and affordably priced. Its first successful product was Kuasha (Kuasha-1, first edition published in June 1964), a short-lived modern-Robin Hood style adventure series. This was closely followed by the Masud Rana, a spy-thriller series, one of Sheba's most enduring and popular imprints.

== Masud Rana Series ==
These books described the adventures of its eponymous hero Masud Rana, an international spy of Bangladeshi origin, closely resembling James Bond in his expertise with weapons and women. Although the publisher of the series was Qazi Anwar Hussain, Hossain liberally borrowed plot lines from popular Western spy thrillers. Nonetheless, the series was a boon for young people in post-war Bangladesh, who had few entertainment alternatives in an era pre-dating video games, cable TV and the internet. The books caused concern among some middle-class parents because of their occasional racy content, and reading Masud Rana was an activity often frowned upon. The series eventually ran to well over a hundred individual titles. There was even a Bengali action thriller movie based on Masud Rana's character. The title was also Masud Rana. It came out in 1974 with famous actor Sohel Rana (real name: Masud Parvez) in the lead role of Masud Rana. It was the first film for Sohel Rana as a lead actor.

== Kishore Classic Series ==
This series introduced the finest works of world literature to a young Bangladeshi audience. The Hossain brothers and their staff were adept at producing translations that were brisk and taut, contemporary and well written. Through their mediation, the kishore or teenagers of Bangladesh made their first (and in most cases, only) acquaintance with the works of Jules Verne, Charles Dickens, Sir Walter Scott, Mark Twain, Sir Arthur Conan Doyle, Alexandre Dumas, père and many others. The translations were usually condensed forms of the original titles and ran to 200-300 pages. While Sheba played a vital role in encouraging reading among young people, making such translations available is arguably its most important contributions.

=== Translators of Sheba ===
The books from Kishore Classic series are translated by Neaz Morshed (original name: Neaz Morshed Quaderi), Rakib Hasan, Asaduzzaman, Kazi Shahnoor Hussain, Babul Alam etc.

== Tin Goyenda ==
The Tin Goyenda series was written by Rakib Hasan, and described the adventures of Kishore Pasha, a Bangladeshi-American teen detective, and his two friends Musa Aman and Robin Milford. The cerebral Kishore lives with his aunt and uncle Rashed in California, and is much given to pinching his lower lip while pondering some knotty problem from his latest case. Robin, his white Irish American friend, is the bespectacled geek, and the irrepressible Musa, a black American Muslim boy, provides comic relief. The series is a remake of Robert Arthur, Jr.'s Three Investigators. Rakib Hasan also adopted plot lines from The Famous Five as well as The Hardy Boys and similar teen-detective titles, but his readers, unaware of such issues, consumed the Tin Goyenda books avidly.

== Adaptations of Western series ==
These were adaptations of pulp cowboy Westerns by authors such as Louis L'Amour. The series introduced the Wild West to the Bengali language. Aleyar Pichche (Behind the Light) was the first Western adapted book in Bangla, written by Qazi Mahbub Hossain. The series was also quite successful and ran to several dozen titles. Other popular contributors in this series include Saokot Hossain and Rowshan Jamil.

== Other publications ==
Other popular titles by Sheba include books on self-help such as Atto-Shommohon (Bengali:- আত্ত-সমহন) or Self-Hypnosis; sports trivia; horror (The Exorcist and The Omen, published in 3 volumes Oshuvo Shongket (The Omen), Abar Oshuvo Songket (Omen Again) and Shesh Oshuvo Songket (The Last Omen) ); and real-world mysteries like UFOs and the Bermuda Triangle. For many years, it also published a monthly magazine called Rahashya Potrika or Mystery Magazine, featuring stories and articles of general interest. A juvenile magazine in the name of Kishore Potrika is also published from Sheba Prokashoni.Sheba titles are characterized by their distinctive red-and-yellow butterfly logo.

Rahasya Patrika (In English: Mystery Magazine) is one of the most popular monthly magazines in Bangladesh. Rahasya Patrika was first published in 1970. Since 1984 from Sheba Prokashoni this magazine was edited by Kazi Anwar Hossain. Sheikh Abdul Hakim, Rakib Hasan, etc regularly wrote in this magazine. Artist Hashem Khan was the first art editor of the magazine.

=== History ===
In the first phase, four issues were published in 1970. After the independence of Bangladesh in 1984 from Seba Prakashani, this magazine was edited by Kazi Anwar Hossain and it started to be published regularly. He was the founding editor of this magazine. The Executive Editor of this magazine is Qazi Shahnur Husain and Qazi Maimur Husain. It is a mystery and adventure monthly literary magazine and the magazine features various types of literary works with reader participation.

Around 1969-70, under the inspiration of journalist Rahat Khan, it was thought to publish a mystery magazine. Accordingly, the first issue was published in November 1970. However, after the release of four issues, the magazine's publication was suspended due to the Bangladesh War of Independence outbreak. After independence, the publication of the magazine could not be started due to various reasons, but in 1984, the magazine was re-published which continues till date.

The magazine is always printed in black and white on paperback paper. Color printing is used for covers. The magazine has various regular sections.
