= Chhayanaut =

Bengali cultural organisation

- ছায়ানট
- Chhayanaut logo
- Formation: 1961; 65 years ago
- Type: Cultural
- Headquarters: Dhaka
- Location: House: 72, Road: 15/A, Dhanmondi, Dhaka, 1209, Bangladesh
- Region served: Bangladesh
- Official language: Bengali
- President: Dr. Sarwar Ali
- General Secretary: Laisa Ahmed Lisa
- Website: chhayanaut.org

The Chhayanaut (Bengali: ছায়ানট) is an institution devoted to Bengali culture, founded in Bangladesh in 1961. As in the case of many similar organizations, it was established during Pakistani rule in Bangladesh to promote and nurture the cultural and musical heritage of Bengal. Every year, Chhayanaut arranges activities in order to celebrate the Pahela Boishakh, the first day of the Bengali new year.

Chhayanaut hosts numerous cultural events throughout the year. These include the Nababarsha or 'Bengali New Year' celebration held beneath the Banyan Tree at Ramna, commemorations of various national holidays, festivals dedicated to Rabindranath Tagore and Kazi Nazrul Islam including their birth and death anniversaries, as well as seasonal programs. Additionally, they organize folklore and folk music festivals, theatre festivals, dance ceremonies, and speeches by esteemed experts. Among their regular activities, Chhayanaut operates a music center and a cultural and general education school called "Nalanda." They also conduct a program called "Shikhad" to introduce children to Bengali culture. They have initiatives to provide activities for autistic babies as well as the elderly. Furthermore, they publish a Bengali quarterly magazine titled "Bangladesher Hridoy Hote" that focuses on literature and culture.

In 1964, on the occasion of Bengali new year 1371, Chhayanaut began celebrating Bengali New Year under the banyan tree at Ramna Park. Over time, this celebration grew into a major national cultural event. Chhayanaut also organizes programs to commemorate the birth and death anniversaries of Rabindranath Tagore (25th Boishakh and 22nd Srabon), as well as seasonal festivals like Autumn and Spring Festival.

== History ==
=== Pakistan Period ===
In 1961, following the centenary celebrations of Rabindranath Tagore, a group of progressive cultural activists in East Pakistan selected the name "Chhayanaut" for a new organization dedicated to music, drama, and dance. The name, which translates literally to "the shade of a large tree," was proposed by Saeedul Hasan to reference Kazi Nazrul Islam's 1925 poetry collection Chhayanaut, a work centered on themes of anti-colonial rebellion, humanity, and Bengali culture. The founding initiative was led by cultural figures including Sufia Kamal, Shamsunnahar Rahman, Mokhlesur Rahman (Sidhu Bhai), and Wahidul Haq. During the late 1960s, the military regime of Pakistan banned the performance and broadcast of Rabindra Sangeet (the songs of Rabindranath Tagore) in East Pakistan as part of an effort to suppress Bengali cultural identity. In defiance of this prohibition, the Rabindra Sangeet singer Kalim Sharafi, alongside the founding activists, used Chhayanaut to preserve and promote Bengali music and arts. Despite the government ban, Chhayanaut discreetly expanded its operations by establishing branches across various district towns, functioning as a decentralized cultural movement against state censorship.

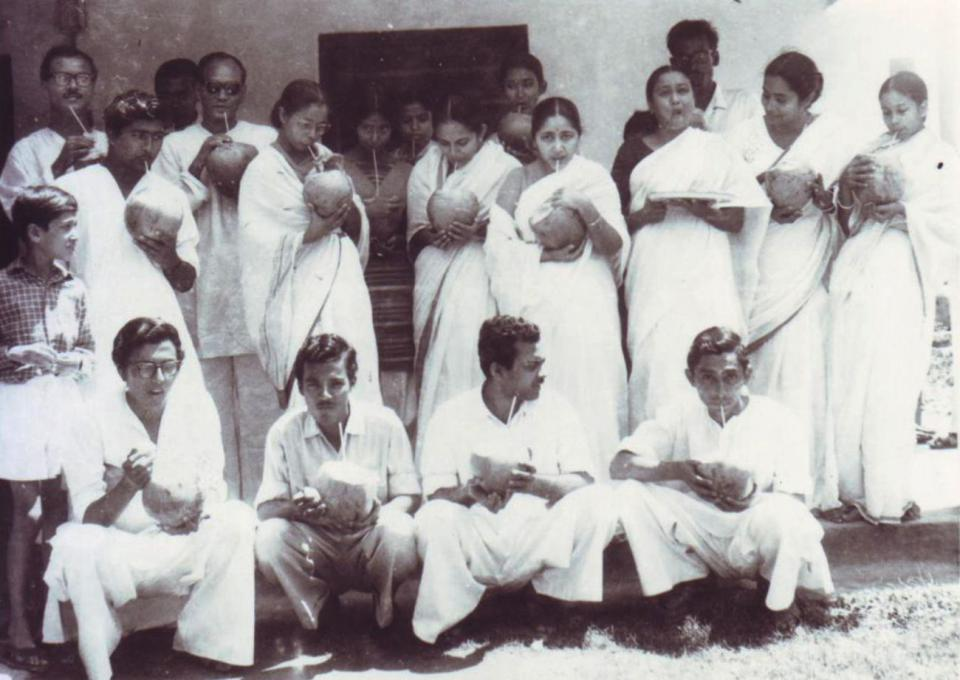
Inauguration of Chhayanaut in 1961

In 1961, the first executive committee of Chhayanaut was formed with Sufia Kamal as President and Farida Hasan as General Secretary. Zahur Hossain Chowdhury and Saeedul Hasan served as Vice Presidents, while Saifuddin Ahmed Manik and Mizanur Rahman Chhana were Joint Secretaries. Mokhlesur Rahman was the Treasurer. Other members included Kamal Lohani, Waheedul Haq, Sanjida Khatun, and Ahmedur Rahman, among others.

Chhayanaut held its first program at the Engineers Institute auditorium, which featured a collection of old Bengali songs. In 1963, under the initiative of Sanjida Khatun, music classes were started on the verandah of the Bangla Academy. Sanjida Khatun and Farida Malik taught Rabindra Sangeet, Bazlul Karim taught tabla, Mati Mia taught violin and sitar, and Sohrab Hossain taught Nazrul Geeti. That same year, the Chhayanaut Music School was officially established and inaugurated by Ustad Ayet Ali Khan on the first day of the Bengali year 1370 (1963 CE).

Chhayanaut's early activities began at the English Preparatory School (Later renamed as Udayan Higher Secondary School). Due to government pressure, the organization had to relocate its operations to Agrani School and College, and later to Lake Circus Girls’ School out of fear of further obstruction. Chhayanaut remained there until 1971.

=== During the Bangladesh Liberation War ===
When the Liberation War began in 1971, many key figures of Chhayanaut, including Wahidul Haque and Sanjida Khatun, were forced to take refuge abroad. In Kolkata, they, along with other like-minded artists, formed the Mukti Sangrami Shilpi Sangstha (Freedom Fighters' Artists' Association). Many prominent artists outside of Chhayanaut also joined this collective. The group performed regularly in refugee camps and freedom fighters' bases, using music and art to inspire and uplift the spirit of resistance. As part of this effort, the group staged a musical play titled Rupantorer Gaan, written by Shahriar Kabir. The script underwent several changes over time. They performed at Rabindra Sadan in Kolkata, where legendary artists such as Hemanta Mukhopadhyay, Debabrata Biswas, Kanika Bandopadhyay, and Suchitra Mitra joined and sang in solidarity. The group raised funds through these performances, and each of them would contribute the money they earned individually to a collective fund dedicated to supporting the liberation movement. This historic cultural movement later became the subject of filmmaker Tareque Masud's documentary Muktir Gaan.

=== Independent Bangladesh (1971 - Present) ===
==== From 1971-2000 ====
After Bangladesh's independence, Chhayanaut was allowed to operate on the premises of the University Laboratory School and College at the University of Dhaka for nearly three decades. This arrangement was made possible by Dr. Nurun Nahar Faizunnnesa, then principal of the school, with formal approval from Professor Mozzafar Ahmad Chowdhury, the Vice Chancellor at the time.

Eventually, Chhayanaut received a permanent home in Dhanmondi. In 1999, the Government of Bangladesh allotted one bigha (0.33 acre) of land in recognition of the institution's significant contributions to Bengali cultural development over four decades. The Chhayanaut Sanskriti Bhaban was built on this land, designed by architect Bashirul Haq. The building complex includes thirty classrooms, a 300-seat modern auditorium, the Romesh Chunder Dutt Memorial Auditorium, a music and cultural library, the Poet Shamsur Rahman Library, and Sanskriti Samvar—an audiovisual center and recording studio.

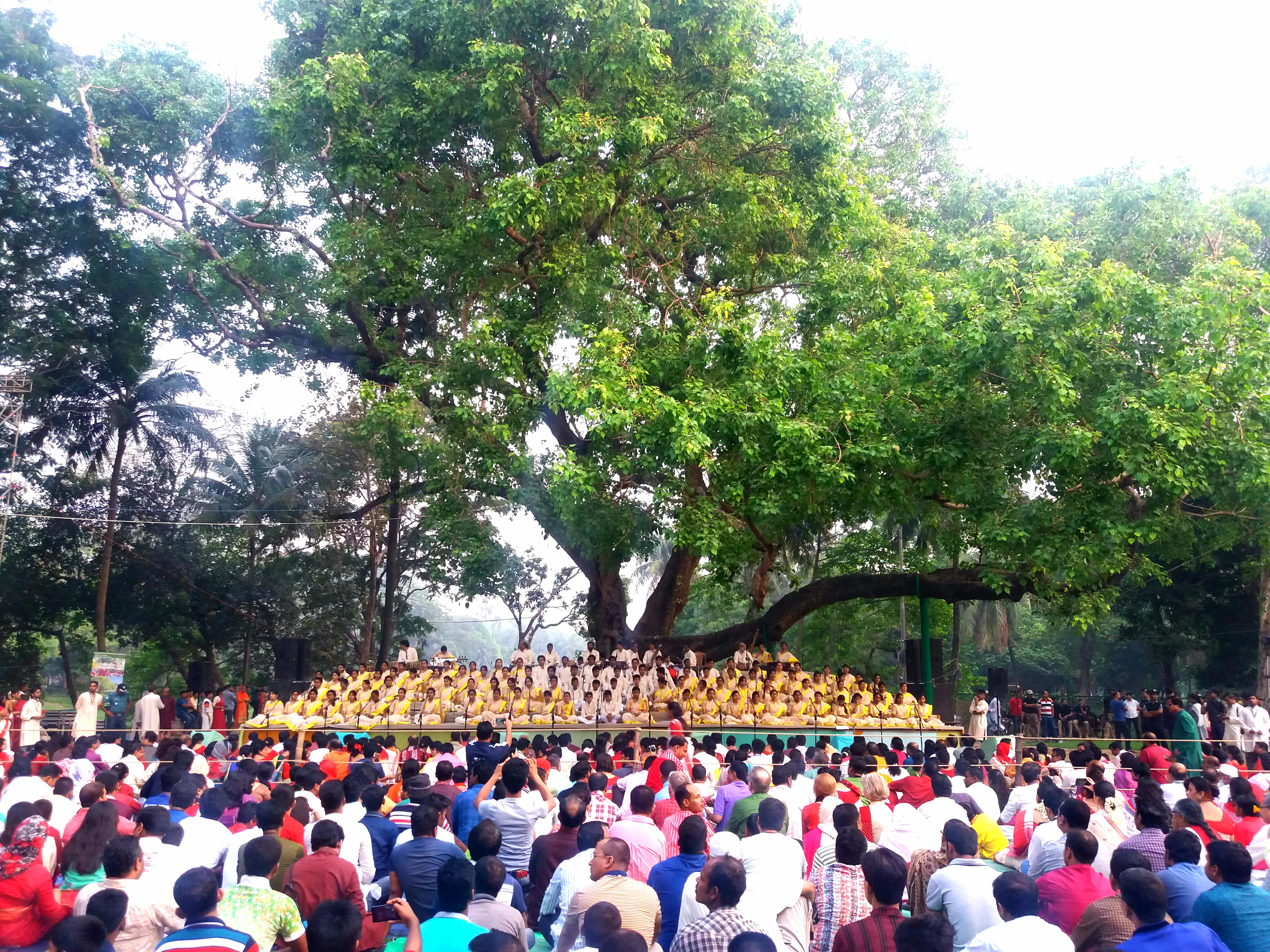
Chhayanaut celebrating new Bangla year 1424 in Ramna Park, Dhaka

==== Ramna Batamul bombings ====
On 14 April 2001, during Chhayanaut's Pohela Boishakh programme at Ramna Batamul, a terrorist attack took place. As the song "E ki Oporup Rupe Ma Tomay Herinu Polli Jononi" played, two bombs exploded at the venue, which was being broadcast live on Bangladesh Television (BTV). Seven people died on the spot, and three more later succumbed to their injuries, with nearly 50 others injured. The cultural event was immediately disrupted. The Islamic fundamentalist group Harkat-ul-Jihad al-Islami (HuJI) was behind the attack. Among the dead was one HuJI militant. Police filed two cases related to murder and explosives. In 2009, charges were brought against 14 HuJI members. In 2014, eight were sentenced to death and six to life imprisonment. However, in 2025, the High Court commuted the death sentences of seven surviving convicts, reducing one to life imprisonment and the rest to 10 years' rigorous imprisonment. Some life sentences were also reduced, and two of the convicts who died while awaiting appeal were acquitted. The state has since announced plans to challenge the reduced sentences. Mufti Abdul Hannan, HuJI’s top leader, had already been executed in 2017 in a separate case.

After the attack, host Hasan Imam condemned the incident live on air. Chhayanaut later released a statement affirming: this act of terrorism would not deter Bengalis from celebrating Pohela Boishakh.

==== Post 2001 ====
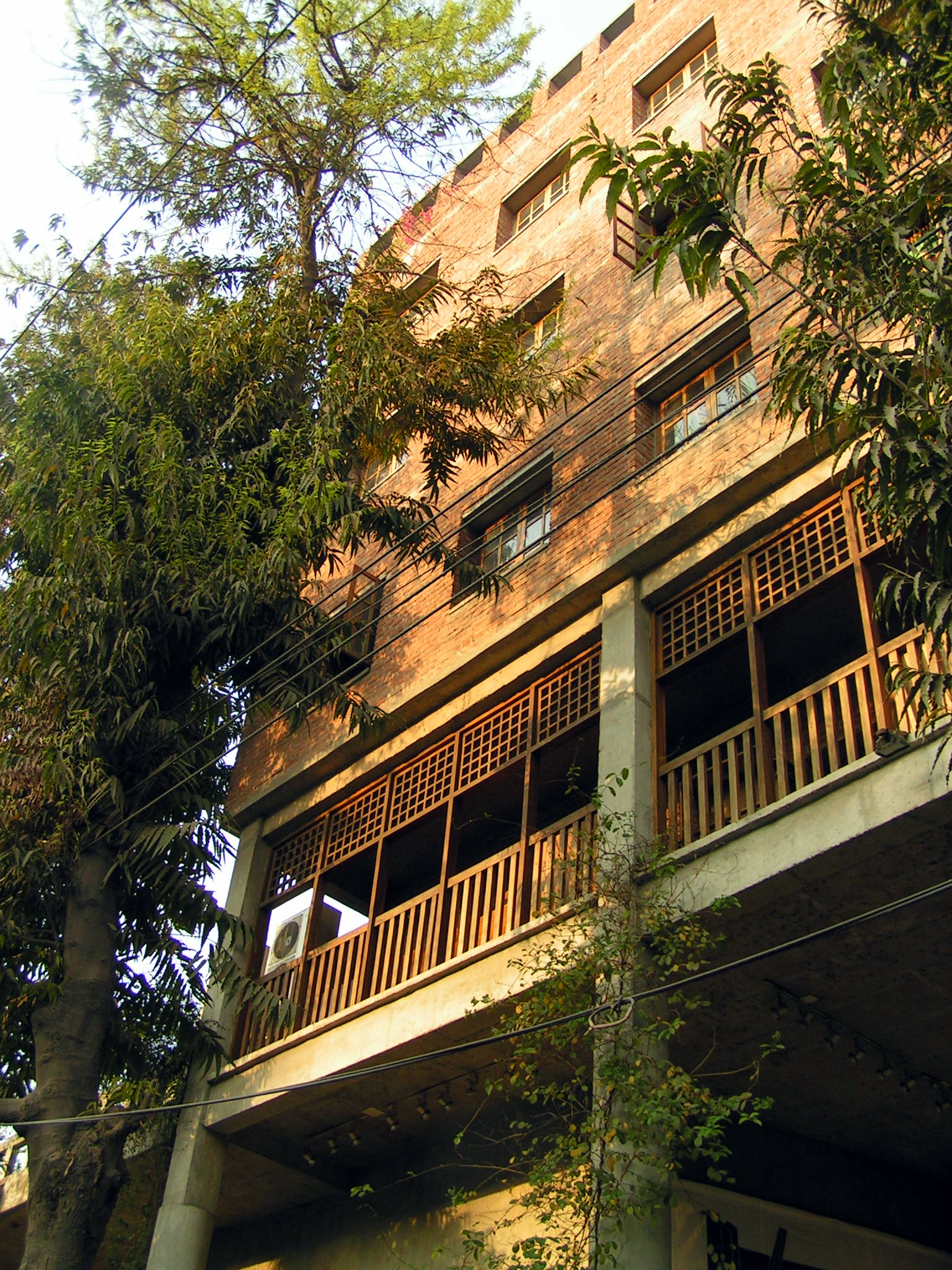
Chhayanaut Building

In 2020 and 2021, Chhayanaut cancelled its annual Pohela Boishakh celebrations at Ramna Batamul due to the COVID-19 pandemic. Instead, the organization focused on supporting the poor and vulnerable during the crisis.

On 18 December 2025, during a protest rally following the reported death of Sharif Osman Hadi, Mostafizur Rahman, the secretary of the Bangladesh Islami Chhatra Shibir unit at Jahangirnagar University, the student wing of Bangladesh Jamaat-e-Islami. called for a "cultural struggle" to achieve what he termed the true independence of Bangladesh. In his address, Rahman advocated for dismantling the "cultural hegemony" of secular organizations, specifically naming Chhayanaut and Bangladesh Udichi Shilpigoshthi.

On the night of 18 December 2025, a mob carried out vandalism and arson at the Chhayanaut building in Dhanmondi. The seven-storey facility was ransacked floor by floor, resulting in extensive infrastructural damage and the destruction of musical instruments, artworks, and historical documents. The total infrastructural loss is estimated at Tk2.2 crore The following day, the Adviser for the Ministry of Cultural Affairs, Mostofa Sarwar Farooki, visited the premises to assess the damage. Farooki condemned the attack, pledged government responsibility for the security of the building, and stated that the administration would provide financial compensation for the infrastructural reconstruction. UN Special Rapporteur Irene Khan also condemned the mob violence against the cultural and media institutions, calling for prompt and effective investigations to ensure accountability. Khan stated that the arson and vandalism reflected a dangerous weaponization of public anger against journalists and artists, warning that such actions could create a chilling effect on media freedom, minority voices, and dissent. She attributed the violence to a failure by the interim government to address impunity and protect media and artistic freedom. On 21 December 2025, Chief Adviser Muhammad Yunus convened a high-level security meeting at the State Guest House Jamuna to address the law-and-order situation following the synchronized attacks on the media outlets and cultural organizations. The Chief Adviser's office subsequently announced that law enforcement agencies had utilized video footage to identify 31 individuals suspected of involvement in the vandalism of Chhayanaut, Udichi, Prothom Alo, and The Daily Star. At least six suspects were arrested immediately following the briefing, with Yunus instructing authorities to expedite the apprehension of the remaining individuals.

In the wake of the incident, Chhayanaut issued a statement reiterating its historical non-political stance and its lack of affiliation with any political party. The organization also condemned synchronized attacks that occurred on the same night against the offices of the daily newspapers Prothom Alo and The Daily Star, characterizing them as attempts to suppress independent media. Additionally, Chhayanaut denounced a subsequent arson attack on the offices of the cultural organization Bangladesh Udichi Shilpigoshthi on the night of 19 December.

In protest of the attacks on Bengali cultural institutions, Chhayanaut announced a musical solidarity gathering titled *Gaan-e Gaan-e Songhoti Shomabesh* (Solidarity Through Song). Held on 23 December 2025, the gathering functioned as a protest against the targeting of cultural spaces and the restriction of freedom of expression in Bangladesh. During the event, Chhayanaut artistes and members of the public performed several patriotic and cultural songs, including "O Amar Desher Mati", "Gramer Nawjowan Hindu Musolman", and "Amar Mukti Aloy Aloy". The demonstration concluded with the waving of the national flag and a collective rendition of the national anthem of Bangladesh, "Amar Shonar Bangla". On 14 April 2026, Chhyanaut successfully hosted its iconic Bengali New Year celebration at Ramna Batamul without disruption.

== Recognition ==
In 2015, in recognition of cultural harmony, Chhayanaut received the Rabindranath Tagore International Award, instituted by the Government of India. On the morning of Monday, February 18, 2019, at a ceremony held at the Pravasi Bharatiya Kendra in New Delhi, the President of India, Ram Nath Kovind, presented the award to Chhayanaut's president, Sanjida Khatun.

In 2019, Chhayanaut received the Shilpakala Padak as a creative cultural organisation for its outstanding contribution to Bangladesh's cultural landscape. The award was accepted by Laisa Ahmed Lisa, the organization's general secretary, at a ceremony held at the National Theatre Hall in Dhaka.

== Notable alumni and faculty ==
- Mita Haque, Rabindra Sangeet
- Khurshid Khan, Sitar
- Chandana Mazumdar, Folk music
- Murtaza Kabir Murad, Classical flute
- Shaheen Samad, Folk music
- Khairul Anam Shakil, Nazrul Geeti
- Syed Saad Andaleeb, Academic
- Sheikh Kamal, Politician and Military officer
