= Waheedul Haq =

Bangladeshi journalist, writer, and musicologist

- ওয়াহিদুল হক
- Born: 16 March 1933; Dhaka, Bengal Presidency, British India
- Died: 27 January 2007 (aged 73); Dhaka, Bangladesh
- Education: University of Dhaka
- Occupation: journalist
- Known for: founder of Chhayanaut
- Spouse: Sanjida Khatun
- Children: Apala Farhat; Partha Tanveer; Ruchira Tabassum
- Parents: Mazharul Haq (father); Mewa Begum (mother)

Waheedul Haq (16 March 1933 – 27 January 2007) was a journalist, writer, and musicologist of Tagore songs. He was awarded Ekushey Padak for music in 2008 and Independence Day Award for culture in 2010 by the government of Bangladesh.

== Early life ==
Haq was born on 16 March 1933, at Bhawal Monoharia village under Keraniganj Upazila in the then Bengal Presidency, British India. His father, Mazharul Haq, was a member of Bengal legislative assembly in 1946. His mother was Mewa Begum. Waheedul was the eldest of three brothers and two sisters. His brother Rezaul Haq is a journalist and another brother Ziaul Haq was killed in 1971.

Haq grew up in the old part of Dhaka city and was educated in the Dhaka College.

== Career ==
Haq, along with other activists, founded Chhayanaut in 1961.

Haq also founded Kanthashilon, Nalonda, Anandadhani, Fulki, Bratochari Samity and Bashanto Utsab Udjapon Parishad. He formed the Jatiya Rabindra Sangeet Sammilon Parishad in 1980. He was also involved in filmmaking and the film society movement during the 1960s. He also composed the musical scores for the Indian director Ritwik Ghatak's film Titash Ekti Nadir Naam.

Haq taught at the Bangladesh University of Engineering and Technology as a part-time teacher.

During his fifty-five-year career in journalism, Haq wrote for The Daily Star, where he worked as an Assistant Editor and later as a Joint Editor. He was a shift in-charge of the Daily Observer in the 1960s. Since the late 1990s he worked as a freelance columnist in several newspapers including Bhorer Kagoj, Janakantha, The New Nation, The Morning News and The People.

== Works ==
- Gaaner Bhetor Diye (Seen Through Music)
- Chetona Dharaye Esho (Come With The Stream Of Consciousness)
- Shangskriti Jagoroner Prothom Shurjo (The First Sun Of The Rising Of Culture)

== Personal life ==
Haq was married to Sanjida Khatun and had three children: Apala Farhat Naved (d. 2011), Partha Tanveer Naved, and Ruchira Tabassum Naved.

== Death ==
Haq died at BIRDEM Hospital in Dhaka on 27 January 2007. He had been suffering from pneumonia and lung and kidney diseases and had been undergoing treatment at the hospital for few weeks.
