= Wasim (actor) =

Bangladeshi actor (1947–2021)

- ওয়াসিম
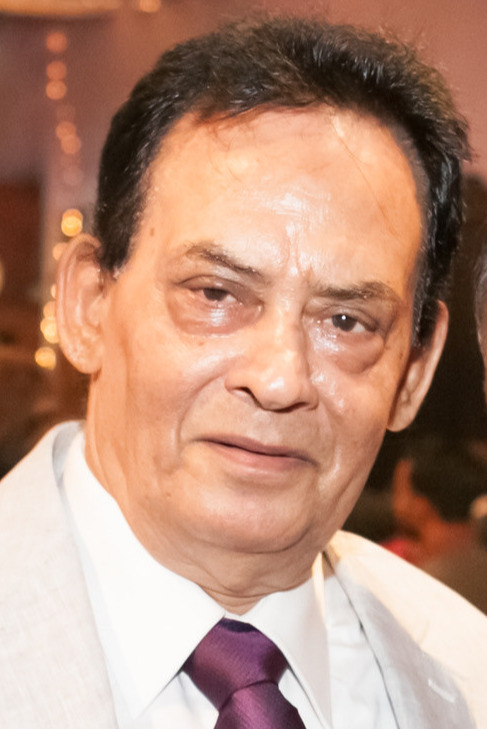
- Wasim in 2018
- Born: Mesbahuddin Ahmed; 23 March 1947
- Died: 18 April 2021 (aged 74); Dhaka, Bangladesh
- Education: Dhaka University (MA)
- Alma mater: Dhaka University
- Occupation: Film actor
- Spouse(s): Parveen Ahmed Ruhi (died 2003)
- Children: 2
- Relatives: Rosy Afsari (sister-in-law); Malek Afsary (co brother-in-Law)

Mesbahuddin Ahmed (23 March 1947 – 18 April 2021), known by his stage name Wasim, was a Bangladeshi film actor who was predominantly worked in Dhallywood cinema. He was made his debut in film industry with the Rater Pore Din (1973).

In 1964, he was crowned as 'Mr. East Pakistan' for bodybuilding in the then East Pakistan (currently Bangladesh). He also served as the first secretary general of the National Sports Council. He was instrumental in bringing legendary boxer Muhammad Ali to Bangladesh during his tenure as the first secretary general of the National Sports Council. He has worked in more than 200 Bangladeshi films, and many of his movies were commercially successful.

== Early life ==
Mesbahuddin Ahmed was born on 23 March 1947, in Shutrapur in the old part of Dhaka. Although his roots are from Chandpur, he spent a great deal of his childhood and adolescence in Shutrapur and Mymensingh, primarily because his father, who was a government officer, was stationed in those places. He completed his matriculation from Mymensingh Zilla School and thereafter his Intermediate from Ananda Mohan College in Mymensingh. Right after he enrolled in Dhaka University and graduated with a B.A. (Honours) and later an M.A. in general history.

== Career ==
Before moving on to the film industry, he also worked at Bangladesh Betar and also served as the first secretary general of the National Sports Council. He also served as the president of the Bangladesh Bodybuilding Federation briefly. He started his career in the film industry as an assistant director of the film Chhando Hariye Gelo (1972), directed by S.M. Shafi. He first acted in the lead role in the film Rater Por Din (1973), which also included Bobita

== Filmography ==
Some notable works of Wasim include, amongst others:

- Rater Por Din (1973)
- Jighangsha (1974)
- Dui Rajkumar (1975)
- Bahadur (1976)
- The Rain (1976)
- Jibon Sathi (1976)
- Dost Dushman (1977)
- Toofan (1978)
- Barud (1979)
- Rajmahal (1979)
- Iman (1979)
- Bini Sutar Mala (1980)
- Be Deen (1980) as Mujahid
- Ke Asol Ke Nokol
- Shakkhi (1981)
- Nantu Ghotok (1982)
- Altabanu (1982)
- Sohag Milon (1982)
- Bishkonnar Prem (1986)
- Setu Bandhan (1987)
- Hisab Chai (1988)
- Jibon Dhara (1988)
- Hisab Chai (1988)
- Raj dulari
- Daku Mansur
- Chandan Dwiper Rajkanya
- Asman Zameen
- Dhormo Amar Ma
- Asami Hajir
- Rosher Baidani
- Rajshinghashon
- Padmabati
- Norom Gorom
- Banjaran
- Rajnondini
- Nishi Padma
- Razia Sultan
- Nadira
- Showdagor
- Rajkonna
- Bahadur
- Pran Shojoni
- Hasna-Hena (1986)
- Zarka

Year	Film	Role	Notes	Ref.
1972	Chhondo Hariye Gelo	Himself	Cameo appearance	
1973	Rater Por Din	Rustom	Debut in as lead role	
1974	Daku Monsur	Wasim		
1974	Ke Ashol Ke Nokol	Yubraj Mir Raihan Chowdhury		
1974	Jighangsha	Police Officer Shahed		

== Personal life ==
His wife, Parveen Ahmed Ruhi, died in 2003. They had a son and daughter. Their son, Dewan Fardun, is a barrister in England. Their daughter, Bushra Ahmed (born 23 July 1991), committed suicide on 4 June 2006, at the age of 14, by jumping off a balcony at her school after getting caught and being confronted for cheating on her test. Washim did not blame anyone for the death of his daughter. Wasim died from a number of health complications on 18 April 2021 at Shahabuddin Medical College Hospital, Dhaka, Bangladesh.
