= Salimullah Muslim Hall =

Dorm hall at the University of Dhaka

- সলিমুল্লাহ মুসলিম হল
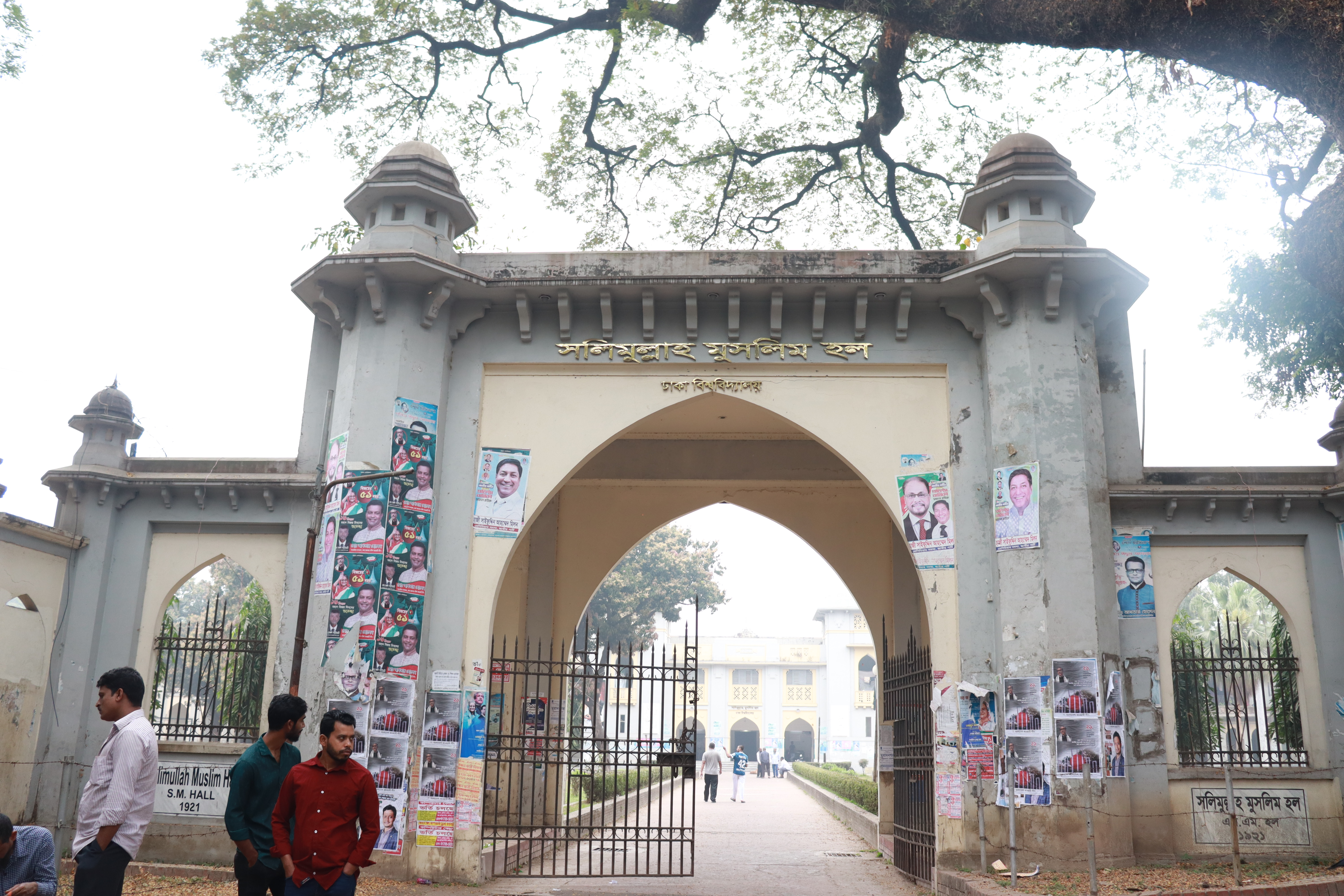

- Location within Bangladesh
- Etymology: Nawab Sir Khwaja Salimullah Bahadur, fourth Nawab of Dhaka and one of the leading Muslim politicians during the British Raj.

General information
- Status: In use
- Location: Bangladesh
- Coordinates: 23.7294°N 90.3907°E
- Opened: 11 August 1931

Design and construction
- Architect: Gwyther
- Civil engineer: D.J.Blomfield and A.F.L.H.Harrison
- Main contractor: Martin & Co

Salimullah Muslim Hall is a residential hall at Dhaka University, named after Nawab Sir Khwaja Salimullah Bahadur. It was inaugurated on 11 August 1931. Among the residential halls of Dhaka University, Salimullah Muslim Hall holds a special status due to its heritage.

== History ==
On 27 May 1912, the British government formed the "Nathan Committee" on establishing a residential hall-based university. The Calcutta University Commission recommended a hall for the Muslim students in order to maintain their own culture and religion. Based on the Nathan Committee's report and the recommendation of the Calcutta University commission, the government of India prepared the Dhaka University bill. The bill was passed by the Indian Law Assembly with the viceroy and governor general Lord Reading agreeing to the bill on 23 March 1920. The university began enrolling students on 10 July 1921.

Dhaka University began with three halls: the Muslim Hall (Salimullah Muslim Hall), Jagannath Hall, and Dhaka Hall (later renamed Shahidullah Hall). The Muslim Hall was originally on the first floor of the Secretariat House. The largest room on the ground floor was divided into a dining room, kitchen, common room, library, and other rooms. In the first year of Dhaka University, the Muslim Hall housed 75 students out of a total of 178 Muslim residential and attached students. Associate Professor Ahmed Fazlur Rahman was appointed as Provost of Salimullah Muslim Hall. Two house tutors were also appointed: Fakhruddin Ahmed, who supervised the students, and Muhammad Shahidullah, who was in charge of religious instruction.

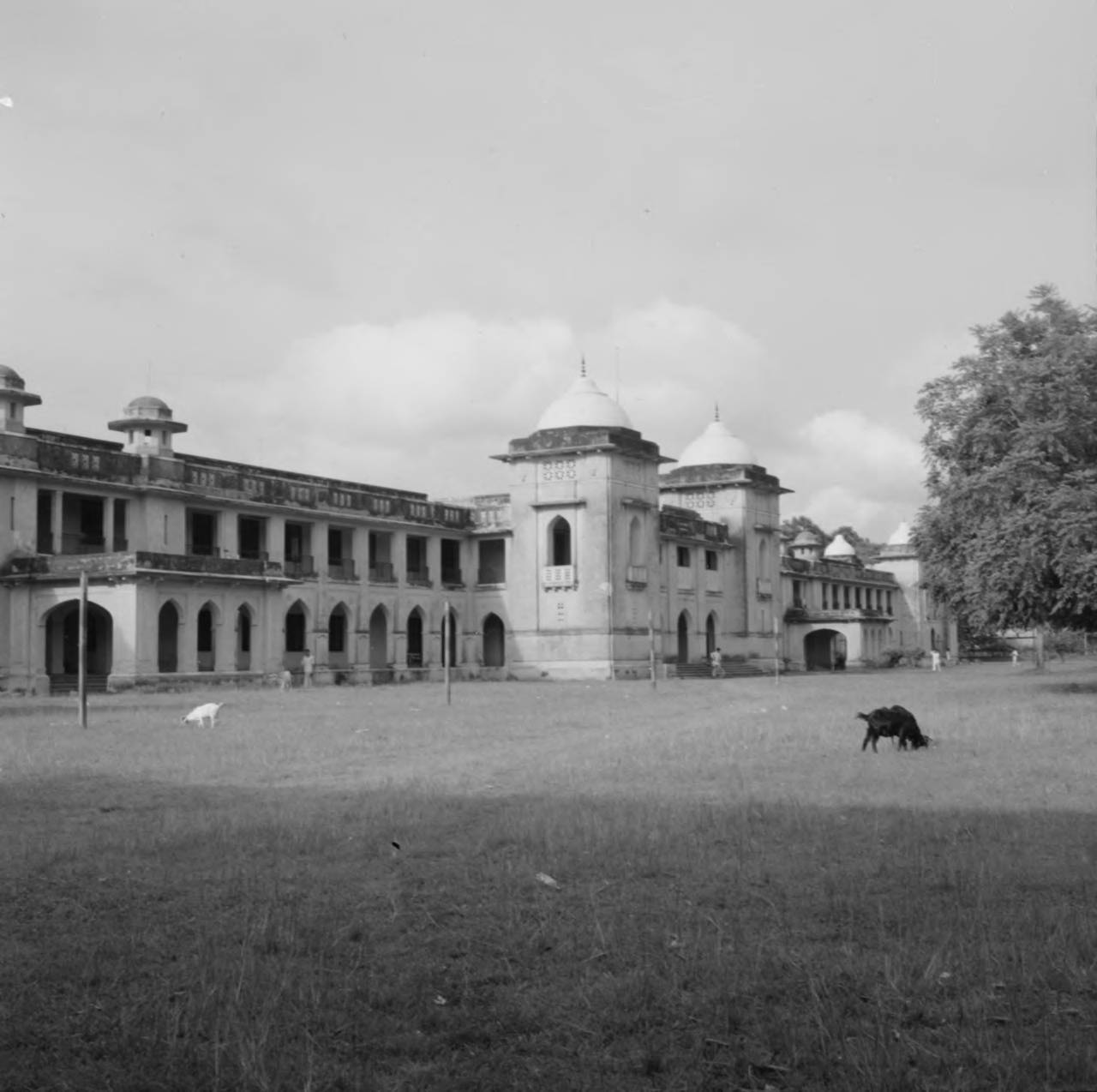
Salimullah Hall in 1952

During the 1922–23 session, the number of residential students increased to 101. Eight additional rooms were arranged for the students. In the 1923–24 session the number of Muslim residential students rose to 127, and 61 rooms were allocated in the Secretariat House. Since the number of residents was increasing regularly, house tutor M.F. Rahman wrote a letter to the vice-chancellor of the university. He noted that "the Mahomedan Community desired that a separate hall should be built for them"

The university agreed to build a new hall and formed a building committee. The committee appointed the architect Gwyther to plan and design the hall. In 1927 the Bengal government provided funds to carry out the plan. During the 1930–31 session, the contractors Messrs Martin & Co. made considerable progress with the construction of the building. In the 1931–32 session the Salimullah Muslim Hall was complete.

The hall currently houses more than 800 students. The renovation of the Salimullah Muslim Hall has been carried out regularly, with the most recent one completed in 2010.

== Architecture ==
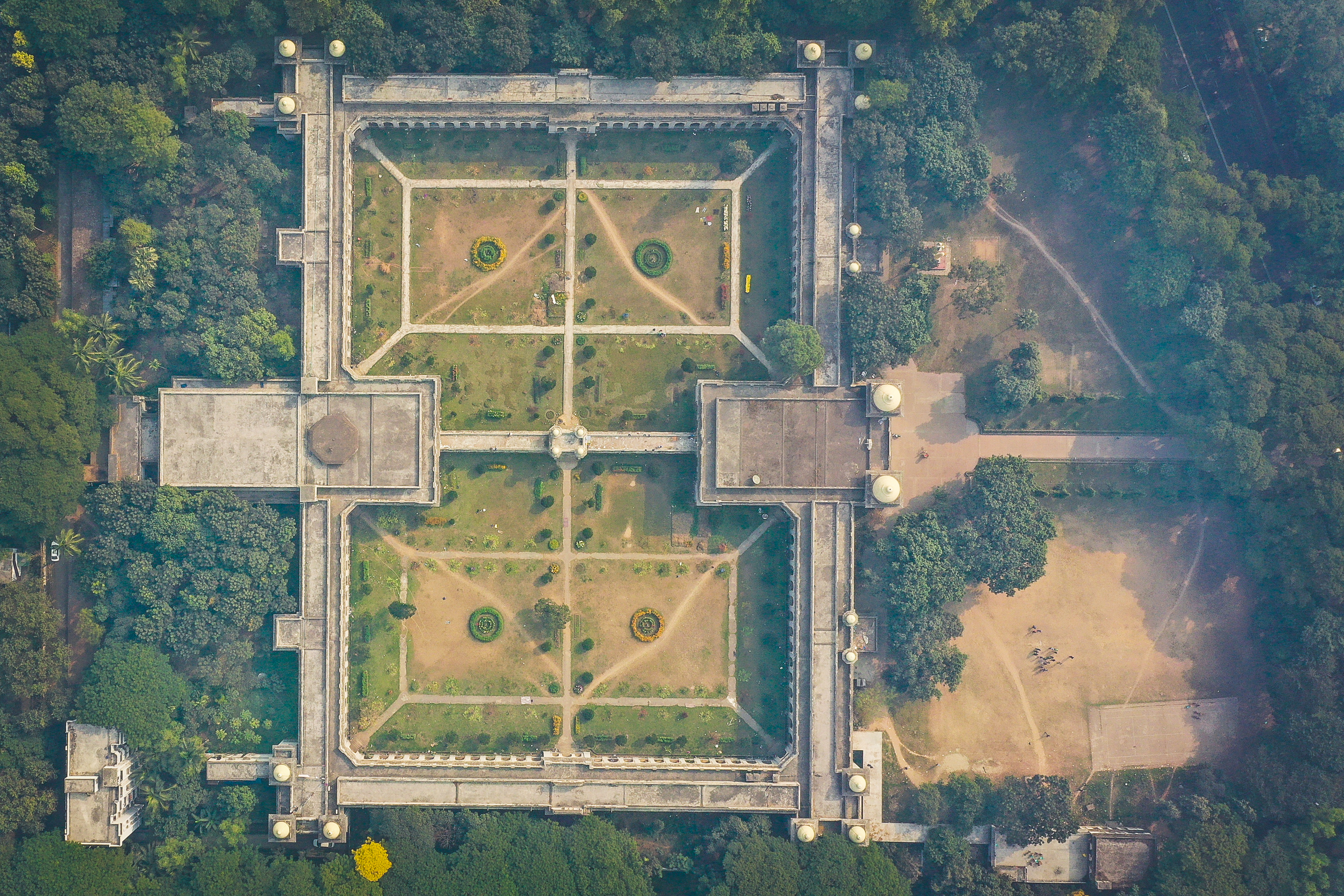
Aerial view of Salimullah Muslim Hall

The two-storey building faces south. It has four wings that surround a rectangular courtyard bisected north and south by a covered walkway. Verandas run along the inner facades, overlooking the courtyard. At the centre of the south wing, the projecting entrance has three pointed arches flanked by two square towers, each crowned with a bulbous yellow-tiled dome.

== Bibliography ==
- Ahmed Monowar, Dhakar Purano Kotha, pg:79-81
- Rahim Abdur Dr.Muhammad, Salimullah Muslim Hall er Protishdhar Kahini, Shuborno Jayanti, pg:2-15
- Mamoon Muntassir, Dhaka-Smriti Bismritir Nagari, Ananya Publication (Fourth Edition: January 2004), pg:260-261, ISBN 984-412-104-3
