= Motaher Hussain Chowdhury =

Pakistani writer

Motaher Hossain Chowdhury
- Born: 1903; Comilla, Bengal Presidency, British India
- Died: 1956 (aged 52–53); Chittagong, East Pakistan, Pakistan
- Occupations: Writer, educationist

Motaher Hossain Chowdhury (Bengali: মোতাহের হোসেন চৌধুরী; 1903 – 1956) was a Bengali writer, thinker and educationist. He was born in Comilla of Bengal Presidency, British India in 1903. He died in Chittagong, East Pakistan, Pakistan in 1956.

== Writing career ==
Chowdhury was a full-time writer and literature lover. His literary works were included in the curriculum of school level, secondary, higher secondary and graduation level Bengali Literature in Bangladesh.

=== Special work ===
- Sanskriti Katha

In "Sanskriti Katha", he wrote, "Religion is the culture of common folks and culture is the religion of educated, elegant people."
