= Abdul Quadir =

Bangladeshi poet, essayist, and journalist

- Born: 1 June 1906; Araisidha, Brahmanbaria, Tipperah district, Eastern Bengal and Assam
- Died: 19 December 1984 (aged 78); Dhaka, Bangladesh
- Education: University of Dhaka
- Occupations: Poet, journalist
- Awards: Full list

Abdul Quadir (1 June 1906 – 19 December 1984) was a Bangladeshi poet, essayist, and journalist. He was the recipient of the Bangla Academy Literary Award in 1963 and the Ekushey Padak in 1976.

== Early life and education ==
Abdul Quadir was born in the village of Araisidha in Comilla District to Afsaruddin (d. 1973), a jute businessman. Abdul Quadir's mother died of cholera when he was 2 years old. He first studied at Bazar Chartola Madrasa, which was moved to Araisidha in 1932 and later named Araisidha Kamil Madrasa. He passed the matriculation from Annada Model High School in Brahmanbaria in 1923. In 1925, he passed the ISc from Dhaka Intermediate College. He then enrolled at the University of Dhaka.

== Career ==
Abdul Quadir published and edited the monthly Jayati during 1930–1933. He served in various posts at the Saptahik Nabashakti (1934), Jugantar (1938), Dainik Nabajug (1941), Banglar Katha, weekly Mohammadi (1946), and weekly Paigam (1947–52). He returned to Dhaka in 1952. From 1964 to 1970, he was the publication officer of the Central Bengali Development Board.

== Personal life ==
Abdul Quadir first married Dilruba Begum of Majhipara in Nabinagar Upazila. She died 3 months later in a palki accident. Later he married Nargis, a daughter of the communist activist Muzaffar Ahmed.

== Works ==
- Dilruba (1933)
- Uttar Basanta (1967)
- Kavi Nazrul (1970)
- Kazi Abdul Wadud (1976)
- Yugakavi Nazrul (1986)
- Chhanda Samiksan (1979)
- Bangla Chhander Itibrtta (1985)

== Awards ==
- Bangla Academy Literary Award (1963)
- Adamjee Literary Award (1967)
- Ekushey Padak (1976)
- Nazrul Academy Gold Medal (1977)
- Comilla Foundation Medal (1977)
- Mohammad Nasiruddin Gold Medal (1977)
- Muktadhara Prize
