= Kazi Abdul Wadud =

Bengali writer and academic (1894–1970)

- কাজী আব্দুল ওদুদ
- Born: April 26, 1894; Bagmara, Faridpur District, Bengal Presidency
- Died: May 19, 1970 (aged 76); Calcutta, West Bengal, India
- Education: Presidency University, Kolkata; Kolkata University
- Spouse: Jamila Khatun (m. 1916–1954)
- Relatives: Qazi Motahar Hossain

Kazi Abdul Wadud (Bengali: কাজী আব্দুল ওদুদ; 26 April 1894 - 19 May 1970) was a Bengali essayist, prominent critic, dramatist and biographer. He was born into a lower-middle-class family, in larger Faridpur (present) Rajbari, Pangsha. His father's name was Kazi Sagiruddin.

== Early life and education ==
Abdul Wadud was born on 26 April 1894 to a Bengali family of Muslim Kazis in the village of Bagmara in Pangsha, Goalanda subdivision, Faridpur district, Bengal Presidency in present-day Bangladesh. He was the son of railway station master Kazi Syed Husain and a relative of Qazi Motahar Hossain. His forefathers had arrived to Mughal Bengal from Western Asia during the reign of Emperor Jahangir, designated as Islamic court judges.

== Academic life ==
In 1913, he passed matriculation from Dhaka Collegiate School. Then he passed l.A. and B.A. from Presidency College, Kolkata. In 1919 he completed an M.A. in economics from Calcutta University.

== Contributions ==
In 1926, he founded Muslim Sahitto Somaj in Dhaka and he also led the Buddhir Mukti (rising up from ignorance) movement with some young writers. His newspaper Shikha helped to increase the growth of the movement. Sayed Abdul hossen and Qazi Motahar Hossain also joined this movement. Kazi Abdul Wadud was closely related with the Bengali Muslim literary movement.

== Career ==
He took a job with Calcutta textbook board. In 1920 he joined the Dacca Intermediate College (now Dhaka College) as a professor of literature because it was very rare to find a graduate post in Bengali. After 1947, Dhaka University proposed him for teaching but he got more opportunities for writing in Calcutta and stayed there for the remainder of his life.

== Marriage ==
In 1916, he married his uncle's eldest daughter, Jamila Khatun. She died in 1954.

== Essays ==
- Saswoto Bongo
- Somaj O Sahitto

== Others books ==
- Mir poribar (story), 1918
- Nodibokshe(Novel), unknown date
- Robindro kabbo pattho(Criticism), Bengali 1334 AD
- Torun (A collection of story and short dramas) Kolkata, Bengali 1355 A.D.
- Poth o bipoth(Drama) Bengali 1346
- Nazrul prothiva(Criticism), 1949
- Azad(Novel), 1948
- Creative Bengal (a translation of Bengali essays), 1950
- Pobitro Quraner Prothom part (torjoma) Bengali 1337 Adt

== Awards ==
In 1970, he got "Shisir kumar award"

== Quotation ==
"I don't want poverty for man, I want that which is great prosperity."
