= List of Ekushey Padak award recipients (2020–2029) =

List of recipients of Ekushey Padak in the 2020s

This is a list of Ekushey Padak award recipients in the 2020s.

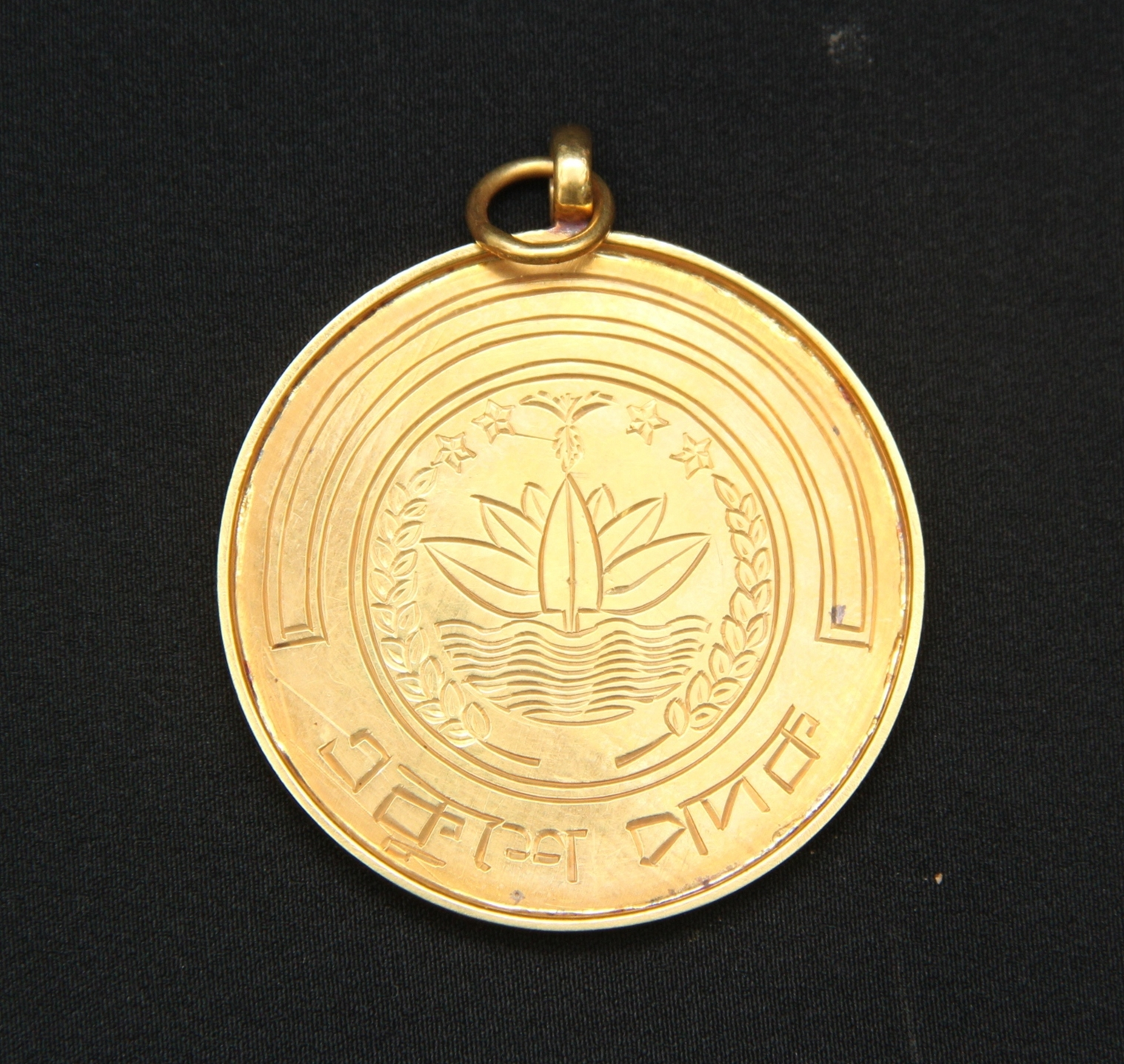
List of Ekushey Padak award recipients
- 1976–1979
- 1980–1989
- 1990–1999
- 2000–2009
- 2010–2019
- 2020–2029

== 2020 ==
It was awarded to 20 people and 1 organisation.

No.	Recipient	Field	Notes
1	Aminul Islam Badsha	Language Movement	Posthumous
2	Begum Dalia Nausheen	Music	
3	Shankar Roy	Music	
4	Mita Haque	Music	
5	Golam Mostafa Khan	Dance	
6	SM Mohsin	Acting	
7	Farida Zaman	Art	
8	Haji Aktar Sardar	Liberation War	Posthumous
9	AAM Mesbahul Haque	Liberation War	
10	Abdul Jabbar	Liberation War	Posthumous
11	Zafar Wazed	Journalism	
12	Jahangir Alam Khan	Research	
13	Syed Mohammad Saifur Rahman	Research	
14	Bikiran Prasad Barua	Education	
15	Shamsul Alam	Economics	
16	Sufi Mohammed Mizanur Rahman	Social welfare	
17	Nuran Nabi	Language and literature	
18	Sikder Aminul Haq	Language and literature	Posthumous
19	Nazmun Nesa Peyari	Language and literature	
20	Sayeba Akhter	Medicine	
21	Bangladesh Fisheries Research Institute	Research	Organization

== 2021 ==
It was awarded to 21 persons.

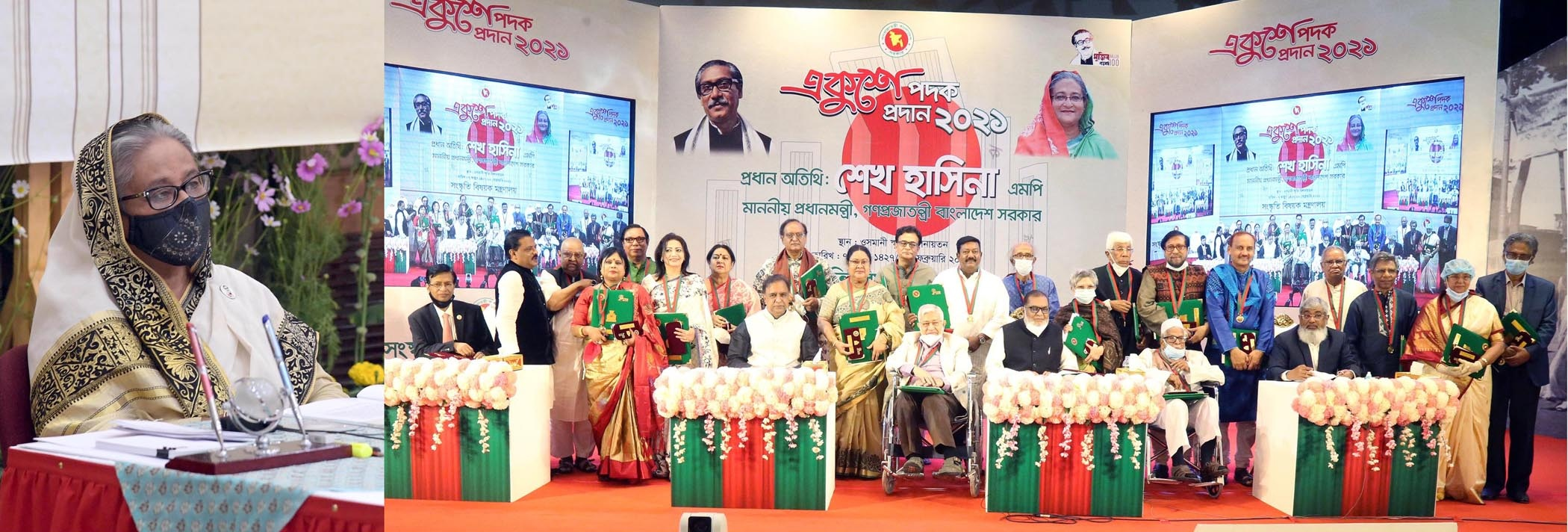

No.	Recipient	Field	Notes
1	Motahar Hossain Talukdar	Language Movement	Posthumous
2	Md. Shamsul Haque	Language Movement	Posthumous
3	Afsar Uddin Ahmed	Language Movement	Posthumous
4	Papia Sarwar	Music	
5	Raisul Islam Asad	Performing arts	
6	Salma Begum Sujata	Performing arts	
7	Ahmed Iqbal Haider	Drama	
8	Syed Salahuddin Zaki	Film	
9	Bhaswar Bandyopadhyay	Recitation	
10	Pavel Rahman	Photography	
11	Golam Hasnayen	Liberation War	
12	Fazlur Rahman Faruque	Liberation War	
13	Syeda Issabela	Liberation War	Posthumous
14	Ajoy Dasgupta	Journalism	
15	Samir Kumar Saha	Research	
16	Mahfuza Khanam	Education	
17	Mirza Abdul Jalil	Economics	
18	Kazi Kamruzzaman	Social service	
19	Quazi Rosy	Language and literature	
20	Bulbul Chowdhury	Language and literature	
21	Ghulam Murshid	Language and literature	

== 2022 ==
In 2022, 24 people of the country were awarded "Ekushey Padak 2022" for their special contribution in various fields.

No.	Recipient	Field	Notes
1	Mostafa MA Matin	Language Movement	
2	Mirza Tofazzal Hossain Mukul	Language Movement	
3	Motiur Rahman	Liberation War	
4	Syed Muazzem Ali	Liberation War	
5	QABM Rahman	Liberation War	
6	Amjad Ali Khandaker	Liberation War	
7	Zeenat Barkatullah	Dance	
8	Nazrul Islam Babu	Music	
9	Iqbal Ahmed	Music	
10	Mahmudur Rahman Benu	Music	
11	Khaled Khan	Acting	
12	Afzal Hossain	Acting	
13	Masum Aziz	Acting	
14	MA Malek	Journalism	
15	Goutam Buddha Das	Education	
16	SM Abraham Lincoln	Social work	
17	Gyanashree Mahathero	Social work	
18	Anwar Hossain	Science and technology	
19	Kamal Chowdhury	Language and literature	
20	Jharna Das Purkayastha	Language and literature	
21	MA Sattar Mandal	Research	
22	Md. Enamul Haque	Research	Team leader
23	Shahanaz Sultana	Research	Group recipient
24	Jannatul Ferdous	Research	Group recipient

== 2023 ==
2 organizations and 19 individuals.

No.	Recipient	Field	Notes
1	Bidyanondo Foundation	Social service	Organization
2	Bangladesh National Museum	Research	Organization
3	Khaleda Manzoor-e-Khuda	Language Movement	
4	AKM Shamsul Haque	Language Movement	Posthumous
5	Haji Mohammad Majibor Rahman	Language Movement	
6	Masud Ali Khan	Acting	
7	Shimul Yousuf	Acting	
8	Manoranjan Ghoshal	Music	
9	Gazi Abdul Hakim	Music	
10	Fazal-e-Khuda	Music	Posthumous
11	Jayanta Chattopadhyay	Recitation	
12	Nawazish Ali Khan	Shilpakala	
13	Kanak Chanpa Chakma	Painting	
14	Momtaz Uddin	Liberation War	Posthumous
15	Shah Alamgir	Journalism	Posthumous
16	Abdul Majid	Research	
17	Mazharul Islam	Education	Posthumous
18	Saidul Haque	Social service	
19	Manjurul Imam	Politics	Posthumous
20	Akhter Uddin Mia	Politics	Posthumous
21	Moniruzzaman	Language and literature	

== 2024 ==
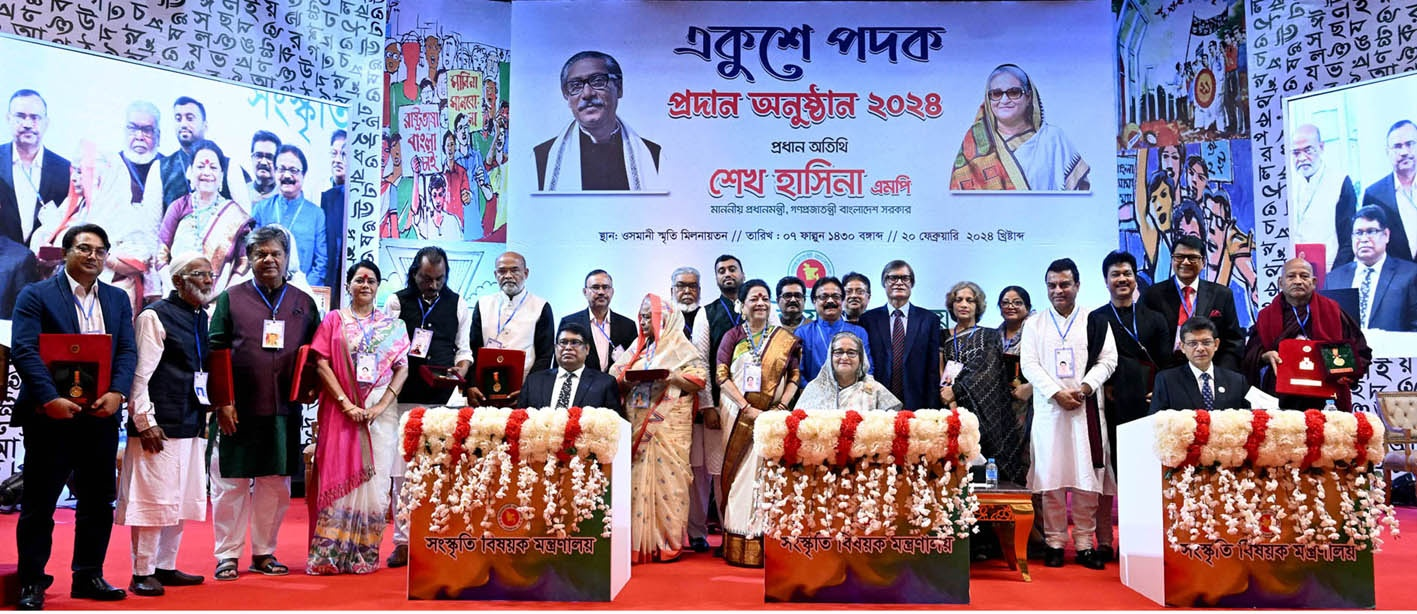
2024 winners

21 individuals.

No.	Recipient	Field	Notes
1	Ashrafuddin Ahmad	Language Movement	Posthumous
2	Hatem Ali Mia	Language Movement	Posthumous
3	Jalal Uddin Khan	Music	Posthumous
4	Kalyani Ghosh	Music	
5	Bidit Lal Das	Music	Posthumous
6	Andrew Kishore	Music	Posthumous
7	Shuvro Dev	Music	
8	Shibli Mohammad	Dance	
9	Dolly Zahur	Acting	
10	Alamgir	Acting	
11	Shimul Mustapha	Recitation	
12	Rupa Chakraborty	Recitation	
13	Shahjahan Ahmed Bikash	Fine arts	
14	Kawsar Chowdhury	Production and archiving of Liberation War-related documentaries	
15	Md Ziaul Haque	Social service	
16	Rafiq Ahamed	Social service	
17	Muhammad Samad	Language and literature	
18	Lutfor Rahman Riton	Language and literature	
19	Minar Mansur	Language and literature	
20	Rudra Mohammad Shahidullah	Language and literature	Posthumous
21	Jinbodhi Bhikkhu	Education	

== 2025 ==
It was awarded to 17 individuals and 1 organization.

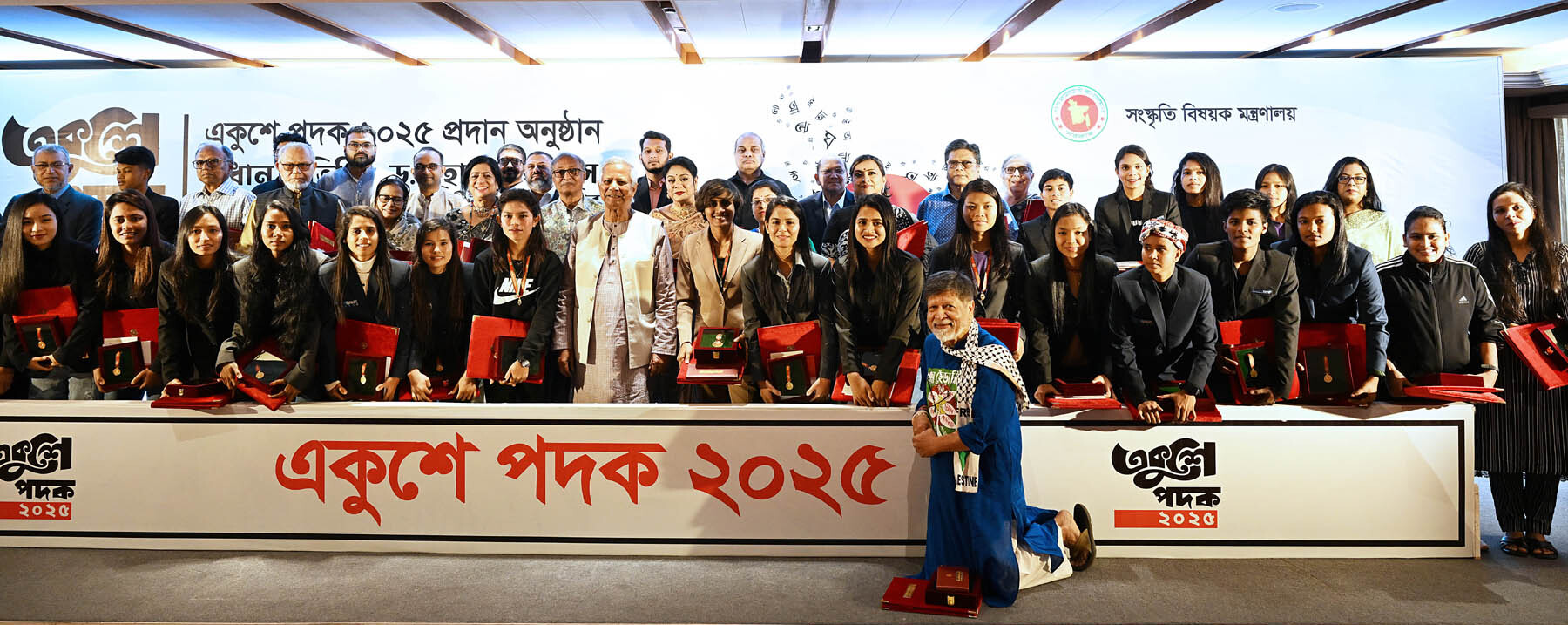

No.	Recipient	Field	Notes
1	Bangladesh women's national football team	Sports	Team
2	Shahidul Zahir	Language and literature	Posthumous
3	Helal Hafiz	Language and literature	Posthumous
4	Shahidul Alam	Culture and education	
5	Azizur Rahman	Arts	Posthumous
6	Ustad Nirad Baran Barua	Music	
7	Ferdous Ara	Music	
8	Mehdi Hasan Khan	Science and technology	Recipient as part of the Avro Keyboard development team
9	Rifat Nabi	Science and technology	Recipient as part of the Avro Keyboard development team
10	Tanbin Islam Siyam	Science and technology	Recipient as part of the Avro Keyboard development team
11	Shabab Mustafa	Science and technology	Recipient as part of the Avro Keyboard development team
12	Mohammad Yusuf Chowdhury	Social service	Posthumous
13	Moidul Hasan	Research	
14	Niaz Zaman	Education	
15	Nasir Ali Mamun	Photography	
16	Rokeya Sultana	Fine arts	
17	Mahfuz Ullah	Journalism and human rights	Posthumous
18	Mahmudur Rahman	Journalism and human rights	

== 2026 ==
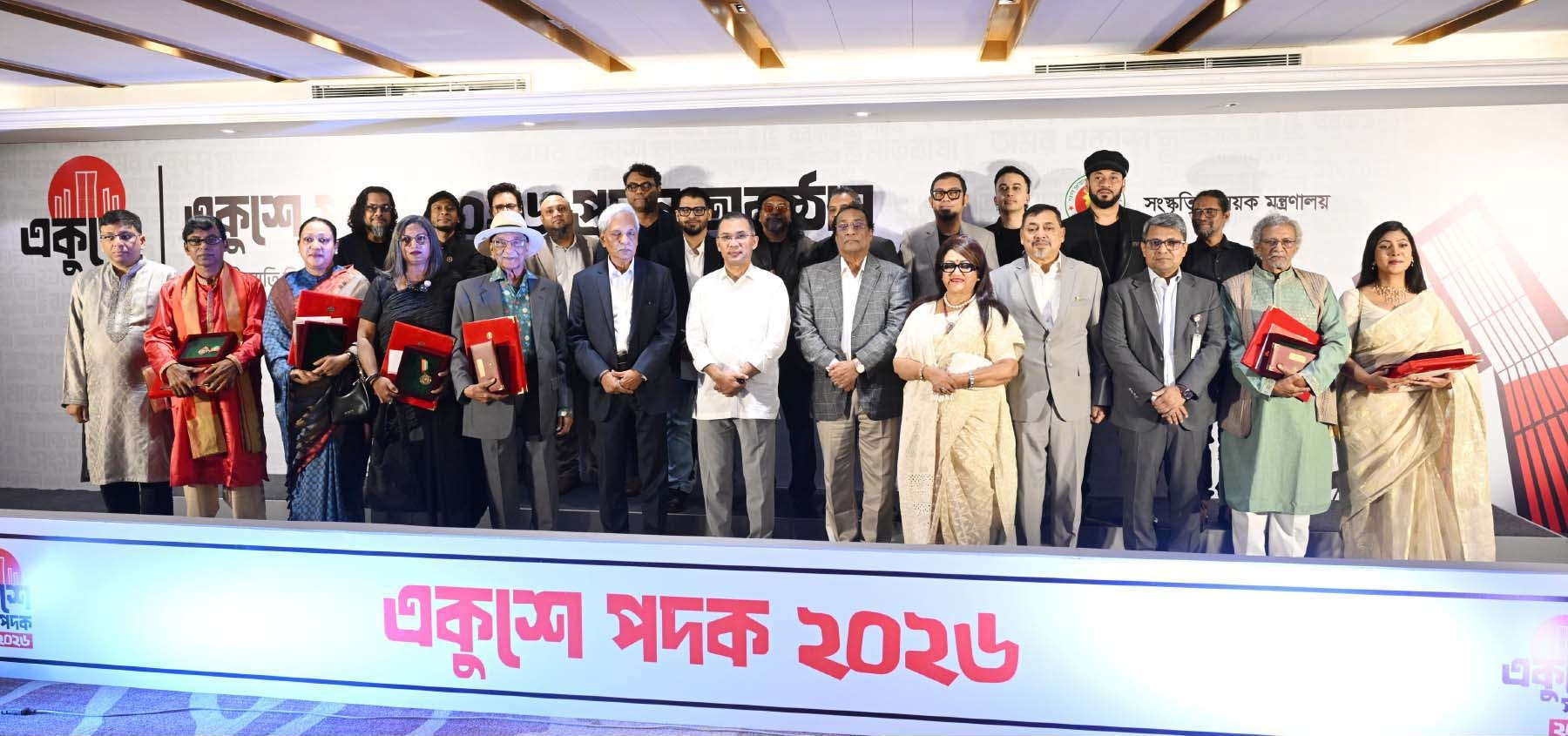
2026 winners

It was awarded to 9 individuals and 1 organization.

No.	Recipient	Field	Notes
1	Farida Akhtar Babita	Film	
2	Abdus Sattar	Fine arts	
3	Marina Tabassum	Architecture	
4	Ayub Bachchu	Music	Posthumous
5	Islam Uddin Palakar	Palagan	
6	Shafik Rehman	Journalism	
7	Mahbubul Alam Majumdar	Education	
8	Tejosh Halder Josh	Sculpture	
9	Arthy Ahmed	Dance	
10	Warfaze	Rock band	Group
