= 1979 in Bangladesh =

- Centuries: 20th; 21st
- Decades: 1950s; 1960s; 1970s; 1980s; 1990s
- See also: Other events of 1979; List of years in Bangladesh

1979 (MCMLXXIX) was a common year starting on Monday of the Gregorian calendar, the 1979th year of the Common Era (CE) and Anno Domini (AD) designations, the 979th year of the 2nd millennium, the 79th year of the 20th century, and the 10th and last year of the 1970s decade.

The year 1979 was the 8th year after the independence of Bangladesh. It was also the third year of the Government of Ziaur Rahman. This year martial law is lifted following elections, which Zia's Bangladesh National Party (BNP) wins.

== Incumbents ==
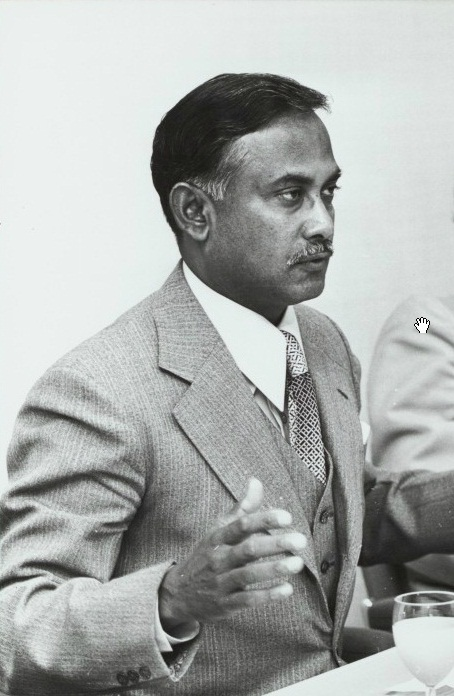
Ziaur
Rahman

- President: Ziaur Rahman
- Prime Minister: Mashiur Rahman (until 12 March), Shah Azizur Rahman (starting 15 April)
- Vice President: Abdus Sattar
- Chief Justice: Kemaluddin Hossain

== Demography ==
Demographic Indicators for Bangladesh in 1979
Population, total	77,529,040
Population density (per km^{2})	595.6
Population growth (annual %)	2.7%
Male to Female Ratio (every 100 Female)	106.2
Urban population (% of total)	13.7%
Birth rate, crude (per 1,000 people)	43.5
Death rate, crude (per 1,000 people)	14.9
Mortality rate, under 5 (per 1,000 live births)	203
Life expectancy at birth, total (years)	52.3
Fertility rate, total (births per woman)	6.5

== Climate ==
Climate data for Bangladesh in 1979
Month	Jan	Feb	Mar	Apr	May	Jun	Jul	Aug	Sep	Oct	Nov	Dec	Year
Daily mean °C (°F)	19.2 (66.6)	20.1 (68.2)	25. (77)	28.2 (82.8)	29.7 (85.5)	28.9 (84.0)	28.3 (82.9)	28.3 (82.9)	28.1 (82.6)	27.1 (80.8)	25.1 (77.2)	20.1 (68.2)	25.7 (78.3)
Average precipitation mm (inches)	9.7 (0.38)	14.2 (0.56)	16.9 (0.67)	94. (3.7)	126.1 (4.96)	388. (15.3)	516.9 (20.35)	551. (21.7)	478. (18.8)	109.5 (4.31)	26. (1.0)	41.6 (1.64)	2,371.7 (93.37)
Source: Climatic Research Unit (CRU) of University of East Anglia (UEA)

== Economy ==
Key Economic Indicators for Bangladesh in 1979
National Income
	Current US$	Current BDT	% of GDP
GDP	$15.6 billion	BDT236.9 billion	
GDP growth (annual %)	4.8%		
GDP per capita	$200.8	BDT3,056	
Agriculture, value added	$8.2 billion	BDT124.3 billion	52.5%
Industry, value added	$2.4 billion	BDT37.2 billion	15.7%
Services, etc., value added	$5.0 billion	BDT75.5 billion	31.9%
Balance of Payment
	Current US$	Current BDT	% of GDP
Current account balance	-$415.9 million		-2.7%
Imports of goods and services	$2,098.0 million	BDT37.4 billion	15.8%
Exports of goods and services	$788.2 million	BDT14.5 billion	6.1%
Foreign direct investment, net inflows	-$8.0 million		-0.1%
Personal remittances, received	$171.1 million		1.1%
Total reserves (includes gold) at year end	$413.6 million		

Note: For the year 1979 average official exchange rate for BDT was 15.55 per US$.

== Events ==
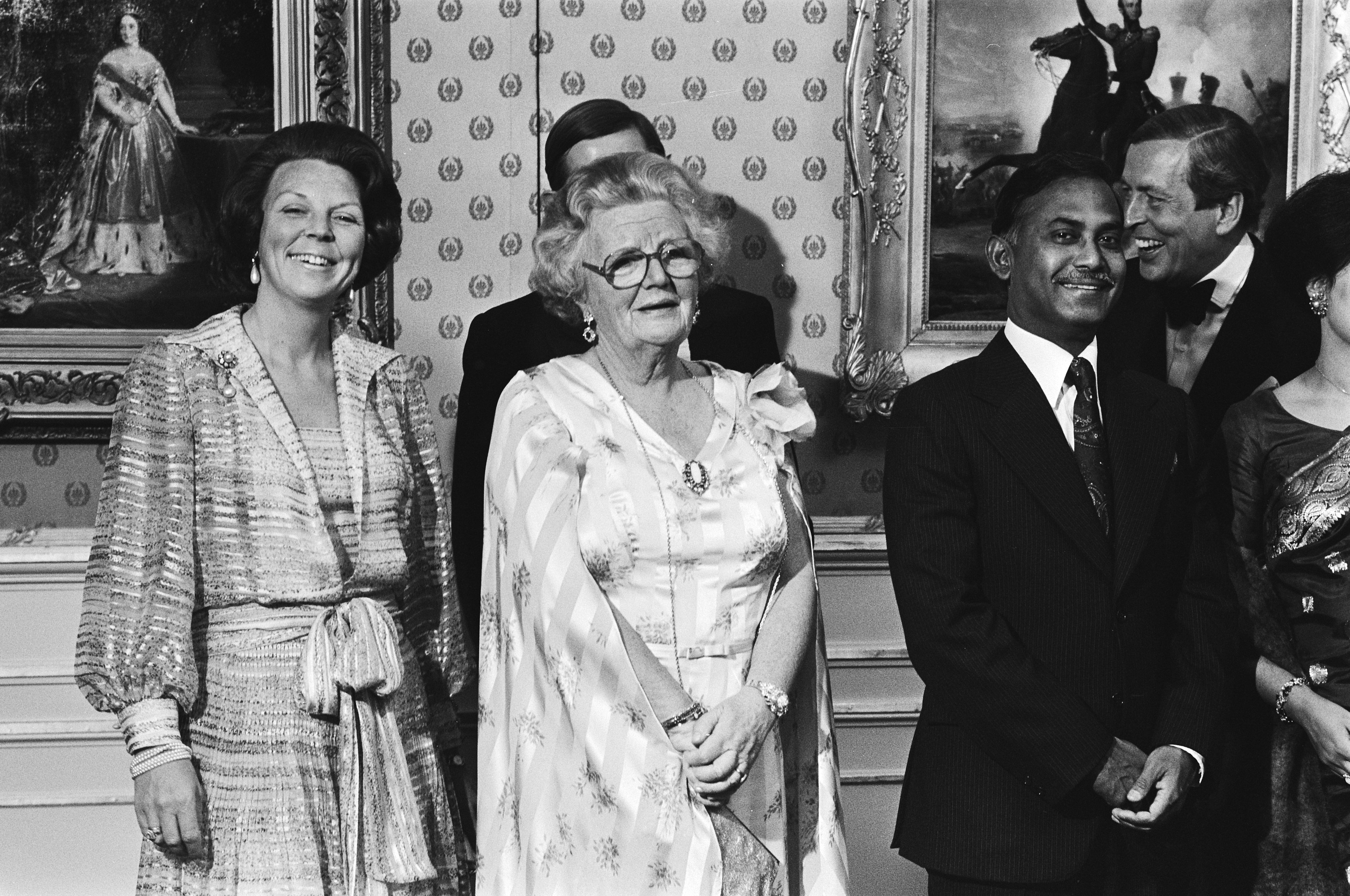
President Ziaur Rahman with Queen Juliana and Princess Beatrix of the Netherlands in 1979

- 26 January – Near Chuadanga, a train derails and overturns, killing at least 70 and injuring at least 300.
- 18 February – Second National Parliamentary Elections were held. The result was a victory for the Bangladesh Nationalist Party, which won 207 of the 300 seats.
- 6 April – The Fifth Amendment to the Constitution of Bangladesh was passed by the Jatiya Sangsad. This Act amended the Fourth Schedule to the constitution by adding a new paragraph 18 thereto, which provided that all amendments, additions, modifications, substitutions and omissions made in the constitution during the period between 15 August 1975 and 9 April 1979 (both days inclusive) by any Proclamation or Proclamation Order of the Martial Law Authorities had been validly made and would not be called in question in or before any court or tribunal or authority on any ground whatsoever.
- 7 April – Bangladesh started the Expanded Program on Immunization (EPI) to reduce child deaths from vaccine preventable diseases.

=== Awards and Recognitions ===
==== Independence Day Award ====
Recipients	Area	Note
Abul Mansur Ahmed	literature	posthumous
Dr. Qazi Motahar Hossain	science and technology	
Dr. Muzaffar Ahmed Choudhury	education	posthumous
Firoza Begum	music	
Samar Das	music	
Phuljhuri Khan	music	
Quamrul Hassan	arts	Designed the Flag of Bangladesh
Tahera Kabir	social welfare	
Nur Mohammad Mandal	population control	

==== Ekushey Padak ====
1. Azizur Rahman (literature)
2. Benajir Ahmed (literature)
3. Abdul Latif (music)
4. Sheikh Luthfur Rahman (music)
5. Abdul Wahab (journalism)
6. Mohammad Modabber (journalism)
7. Muhammad Enamul Haque (education)

=== Sports ===
- Domestic football: Team BJMC won 1979 Dhaka First Division League title, while Abahani KC came out runners-up.

== Births ==
- Kazi Sharmin Nahid Nupur also known by stage name Shabnur, film actress
- Sadika Parvin Popy, film actress
- Anila Naz Chowdhury, singer

== Deaths ==
- 3 April – Syed Mahbub Murshed, lawyer and jurist (b. 1911)
- 27 June – Bande Ali Mia, poet (b. 1906)

== See also ==
- 1970s in Bangladesh
- List of Bangladeshi films of 1979
- Timeline of Bangladeshi history
