= 1980 in Bangladesh =

- Centuries: 20th; 21st
- Decades: 1960s; 1970s; 1980s; 1990s; 2000s
- See also: Other events of 1980; List of years in Bangladesh

1980 (MCMLXXX) was a leap year starting on Tuesday of the Gregorian calendar, the 1980th year of the Common Era (CE) and Anno Domini (AD) designations, the 980th year of the 2nd millennium, the 80th year of the 20th century, and the 1st year of the 1980s decade.

The year 1980 was the 9th year after the independence of Bangladesh. It was also the fourth year of the Government of Ziaur Rahman.

== Incumbents ==
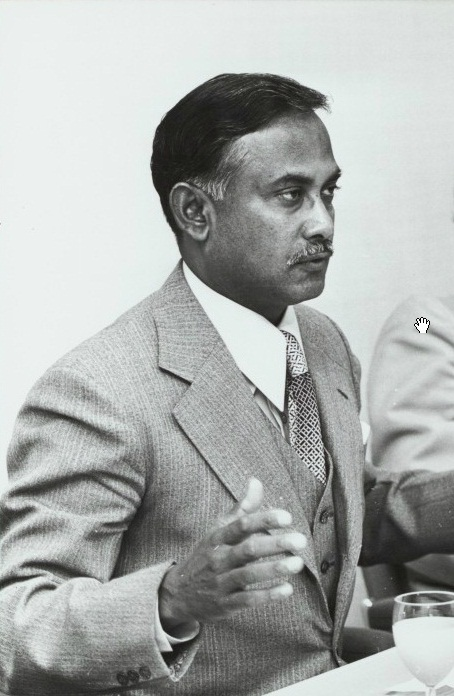
Ziaur
Rahman

- President: Ziaur Rahman
- Prime Minister: Shah Azizur Rahman
- Vice President: Abdus Sattar
- Chief Justice: Kemaluddin Hossain

== Demography ==
Demographic Indicators for Bangladesh in 1980
Population, total	79,639,498
Population density (per km^{2})	611.8
Population growth (annual %)	2.7%
Male to Female Ratio (every 100 Female)	106.2
Urban population (% of total)	14.9%
Birth rate, crude (per 1,000 people)	43.0
Death rate, crude (per 1,000 people)	14.4
Mortality rate, under 5 (per 1,000 live births)	199
Life expectancy at birth, total (years)	52.9
Fertility rate, total (births per woman)	6.4

== Climate ==
Climate data for Bangladesh in 1980
Month	Jan	Feb	Mar	Apr	May	Jun	Jul	Aug	Sep	Oct	Nov	Dec	Year
Daily mean °C (°F)	18.3 (64.9)	20.6 (69.1)	25.1 (77.2)	28.9 (84.0)	27.2 (81.0)	28.2 (82.8)	28.1 (82.6)	28.1 (82.6)	28.4 (83.1)	26.4 (79.5)	23.4 (74.1)	20.4 (68.7)	25.3 (77.5)
Average precipitation mm (inches)	4.4 (0.17)	34.1 (1.34)	56.2 (2.21)	74.5 (2.93)	319.8 (12.59)	354.4 (13.95)	510.3 (20.09)	393.8 (15.50)	246.2 (9.69)	173.1 (6.81)	1.2 (0.05)	.6 (0.02)	2,168.6 (85.38)
Source: Climatic Research Unit (CRU) of University of East Anglia (UEA)

== Economy ==
Key Economic Indicators for Bangladesh in 1980
National Income
	Current US$	Current BDT	% of GDP
GDP	$18.1 billion	BDT280.8 billion	
GDP growth (annual %)	.8%		
GDP per capita	$227.8	BDT3,526	
Agriculture, value added	$5.6 billion	BDT86.4 billion	31.6%
Industry, value added	$3.6 billion	BDT56.5 billion	20.6%
Services, etc., value added	$8.5 billion	BDT130.9 billion	47.8%
Balance of Payment
	Current US$	Current BDT	% of GDP
Current account balance	-$702.1 million		-3.9%
Imports of goods and services	$2,834.0 million	BDT50.2 billion	17.9%
Exports of goods and services	$1,004.7 million	BDT15.4 billion	5.5%
Foreign direct investment, net inflows	$8.5 million		0.0%
Personal remittances, received	$338.7 million		1.9%
Total reserves (includes gold) at year end	$331.2 million		
Total reserves in months of imports	1.4		

Note: For the year 1980 average official exchange rate for BDT was 15.45 per US$.

== Events ==
- 25 March – Bangladeshi armed forces allegedly attacked the village of Kawkhali and left about 300 dead.
- 1 April - New regulation came into effect enabling the protection of foreign investments in Bangladesh from Government actions like nationalization and expropriation.
- May - The village level administrative bodies were formed for the first time under the title of "Swanirvar Gram Sarkar" (Self-sufficient village Government).
- May - President Rahman addressed letters to the Heads of Government of the countries of South Asia, presenting his vision for the future of the region and the compelling arguments for regional cooperation in the context of evolving international realities.
- 17 June - Coup d'état attempt against President Rahman fails

=== Sports ===
- The Bangladesh Olympic Association was recognized by the International Olympic Committee on 1 January 1980.
- International football:
  - Bangladesh participated in 1980 AFC Asian Cup, where they lost all 4 of their group matches and ended the tournament at the bottom of the points table.
- Domestic football:
  - Mohammedan SC won 1980 Dhaka First Division League title, while Team BJMC came out runners-up.
  - Mohammedan SC & Brothers Union jointly won the first title of Bangladesh Federation Cup.
- Cricket:
  - Pakistani cricket team visited Bangladesh but matches were abandoned due to unwarranted crowd interference during the first match.

=== Awards and recognitions ===
==== International Recognition ====
- Fazle Hasan Abed, the founder of BRAC, was awarded Ramon Magsaysay Award.

==== Independence Day Award ====
Recipients	Area	Note
Dr. Muhammad Shahidullah	education	posthumous
Mawlana Abu Zafar Mohammad Saleh	education	
Alhaz Zahir Uddin	social work	posthumous
Farrukh Ahmed	literature	posthumous
Munier Chowdhury	science and technology	posthumous
Sohrab Hossain	music	
Dr. Khondokar Ameer Hasan	science and technology	

==== Ekushey Padak ====
1. Abul Hussain (literature)
2. Bedaruddin Ahmad (music)
3. Mohammad Abdul Jabbar (music)
4. Hamidur Rahman (art)
5. Murtaja Baseer (art)
6. Ronen Kushari (drama)
7. Mujibur Rahman Khan (journalism)
8. Mohammad Ferdous Khan (education)

== Births ==
- Zunaid Ahmed Palak, politician
- Abdullah Al Rakib, chess grandmaster

== Deaths ==
- 20 April – Begum Badrunnessa Ahmed, social worker (b. 1903)
- 30 June – Bhupati Bhushan Chowdhury, politician (b. 1930)

== See also ==
- 1980s in Bangladesh
- List of Bangladeshi films of 1980
- Timeline of Bangladeshi history
