= List of Ekushey Padak award recipients (1976–1979) =

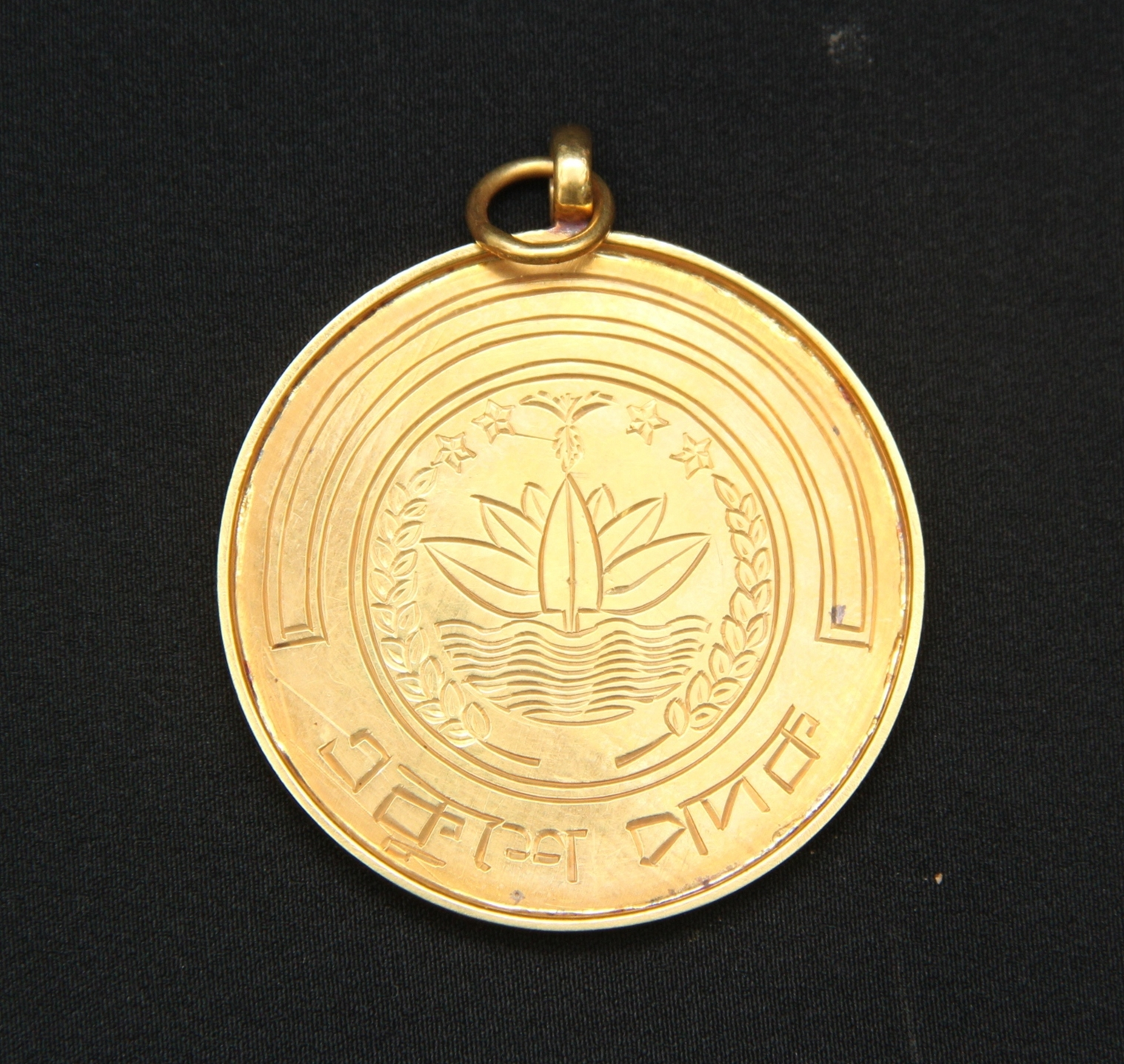
List of Ekushey Padak award recipients
- 1976–1979
- 1980–1989
- 1990–1999
- 2000–2009
- 2010–2019
- 2020–2029

== 1976 ==
In the year 1976, the first year of the award, 9 individuals were awarded in recognition of their contribution:

1. Kazi Nazrul Islam (Literature)
2. Muhammad Qudrat-i-Khuda (Education)
3. Jasimuddin (literature)
4. Sufia Kamal (literature)
5. Abdul Quadir (literature)
6. Muhammed Mansooruddin (education)
7. Tofazzal Hossain Manik Miah (journalism)
8. Abul Kalam Shamsuddin (literature)
9. Abdus Salam (Editor) (journalism)

== 1977 ==
1. Mohammad Nasiruddin (literature)
2. Ustad Gul Mohammad Khan (music)
3. Ibrahim Khan (education)
4. Mahmuda Khatun Siddiqua (literature)
5. Khondakar Abdul Hamid (journalism)
6. Ayub Ali (education)
7. Shamsur Rahman (literature)
8. Zahir Raihan (drama)
9. Rashid Choudhury (fine arts)
10. Abdul Alim (music)
11. Altaf Mahmud (music)
12. Ferdausi Rahman (music)
13. Farrukh Ahmad (literature)

== 1978 ==
1. Khan Mohammad Moinuddin (literature)
2. Ahsan Habib (literature)
3. Zulfikar Haidar (literature)
4. Mahbubul Alam (literature)
5. Natyaguru Nurul Momen (literature)
6. Ava Alam (music)
7. Safiuddin Ahmed (art)
8. Serajuddin Hossain (journalism)
9. Sayed Moazzem Hossain (art)

== 1979 ==
1. Azizur Rahman (literature)
2. Benajir Ahmed (literature)
3. Abdul Latif (music)
4. Sheikh Luthfur Rahman (music)
5. Abdul Wahab (journalism)
6. Mohammad Modabber (journalism)
7. Muhammad Enamul Haque (education)
