= List of Ekushey Padak award recipients (1980–1989) =

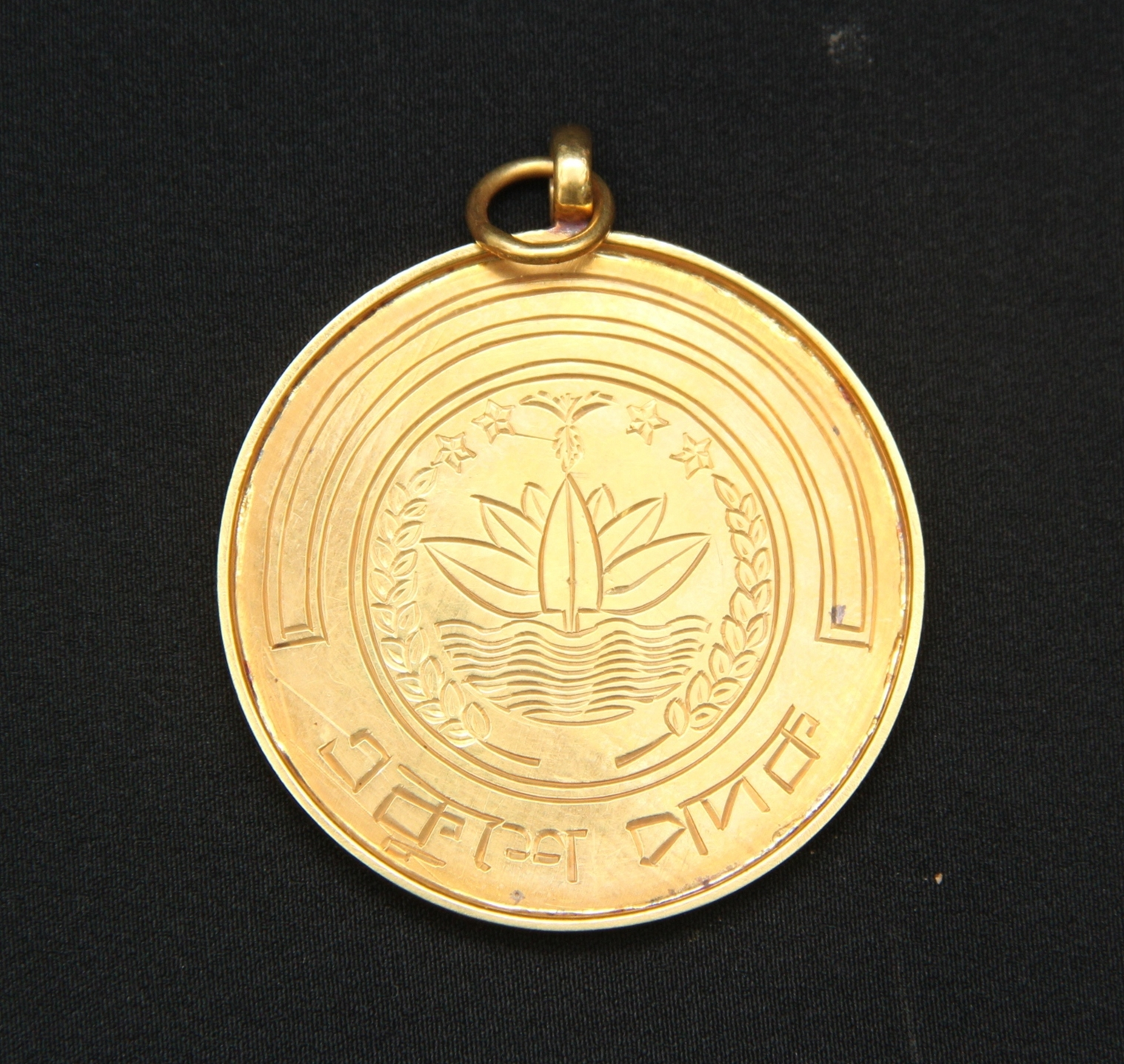
List of Ekushey Padak award recipients
- 1976–1979
- 1980–1989
- 1990–1999
- 2000–2009
- 2010–2019
- 2020–2029

== 1980 ==
1. Abul Hussain (literature)
2. Bedaruddin Ahmad (music)
3. Mohammad Abdul Jabbar (music)
4. Hamidur Rahman (art)
5. Murtaja Baseer (art)
6. Ronen Kushari (drama)
7. Mujibur Rahman Khan (journalism)
8. Mohammad Ferdous Khan (education)

== 1981 ==
1. Abu Rushd Matinuddin (literature)
2. Aminul Islam (fine arts)
3. Abdul Halim Chowdhury (music)
4. Mumtaz Ali Khan (music)
5. Gauhar Jamil (dance)
6. Mohammad Zakaria (drama)
7. Zahur Hossain Chowdhury (journalism)
8. Obaidul Huq (journalism)
9. Mustafa Nurul Islam (literature)

== 1982 ==
1. Syed Ali Ahsan (literature)
2. Abul Hasan (literature)
3. Talim Hossain (literature)
4. Abdul Hakim (education)
5. Ful Mohammad (music)
6. SM Sultan (fine arts)
7. G A Mannan (literature)
8. Sanaullah Nuri (journalism)

== 1983 ==
1. Shawkat Osman (literature)
2. Sanaul Huq (literature)
3. Abdul Gaffar Chowdhury (literature)
4. M A Kuddus (education)
5. Shahidullah Kaisar (journalism)
6. Syed Nur Uddin (journalism)
7. Abu Jafar Shamsuddin (literature)
8. Mohammad Kibria (painting)
9. Barin Mazumder (music)
10. Muhammad Mansuruddin

== 1984 ==
1. Anisuzzaman (education)
2. Habibur Rahman (education)
3. Syed Waliullah (literature)
4. Hasan Hafizur Rahman (literature)
5. Syed Shamsul Huq (literature)
6. Rashid Karim (literature)
7. Sikandar Abu Zafar (journalism)
8. Mir Qasim Khan (music)
9. Sabina Yasmin (music)
10. Qayyum Chowdhury (fine arts)

== 1985 ==
1. Abu Zafar Obaidullah (literature)
2. Gazi Shamsur Rahman (literature)
3. Abdullah Al-Muti (science)
4. Govinda Chandra Dev (education)
5. Mohammad Abdul Jabbar (education)
6. Kalim Sharafi (music)
7. Abed Hossain Khan (music)
8. Syed Jahangir (fine arts)

== 1986 ==
1. Alauddin Al Azad (literature)
2. Al Mahmud (literature)
3. Satyen Sen
4. Askar Ibne Shaikh (literature)
5. Munshi Raisuddin (music)
6. Mobarak Hossain Khan (music)
7. Dhir Ali Miah (music)

== 1987 ==
1. Mohammad Moniruzzaman (literature)
2. Abu Hena Mustafa Kamal (music)
3. Anis Siddiqui
4. Jahanara Arzu (literature)
5. Ahmad Shamsul Islam (education)
6. M. A. Naser (education)
7. Principal Abul Kashem (education)
8. Nurul Islam Patowary (journalism)
9. Ahmed Humayun (journalism)
10. Kanailal Shil (instrumental music)
11. Farida Parveen (music)
12. Syed Mainul Hossain (architecture)

== 1988 ==
1. Bonde Ali Miah (literature)
2. Ashraf Siddiqui (literature)
3. Fazal Shahabuddin (literature)
4. Anwar Hossain (drama)
5. Sudhin Das (music)

== 1989 ==
1. Shahed Ali (literature)
2. Razia Mazid (literature)
3. Mahmud Shah Koreshi (education)
4. Mohammad Asafudowlah Reza (journalism)
5. AKM Shahidul Huq (journalism)
6. Abdur Razzak (fine arts)
7. Amalendu Biswas (drama act)
