= List of winners of the Ekushey Padak in Journalism =

The Ekushey Padak in Journalism is a national and second-highest civilian award for journalists in Bangladesh. The Ekushey Padak has been awarded in this field since 1976 to recognize outstanding contributions to journalism in Bangladesh. The award was introduced in 1976 in memory of the martyrs of the Language Movement. Each recipient is awarded a medal, a certificate of honor, a replica, and a cash prize. The Ekushey Padak is a 35-gram medal made of 18-carat gold, designed by Nitun Kundu. Initially, the prize money was 25,000 taka; it has now been increased to 2 lakh taka.

== List of winners ==
Year	Winners	Ref.
1976	Tofazzal Hossain Manik Mia; Abul Kalam Shamsuddin; Abdus Salam	
1977	Khandaker Abdul Hamid	
1978	Sirajuddin Hossain	
1979	Abdul Wahab; Mohammad Modabber	
1980	Mujibur Rahman Khan	
1981	Obaid ul Haq; Zahur Hossain Chowdhury	
1982	Sanaullah Noori	
1983	Shahidullah Kaiser; Syed Nooruddin; Abu Jafar Shamsuddin	
1984	Sikandar Abu Zafar	
1985	Not awarded	
1986	Not awarded	
1987	Nurul Islam Patwary; SM Ahmed Humayun	
1988	Not awarded	
1989	Muhammad Asaf-ud-Daulah; AKM Shahidul Haque	
1990	Abdul Ghani Hazari	
1991	Faiz Ahmed	
1992	Gias Kamal Chowdhury; Ataus Samad	
1993	Riaz Uddin Ahmed	
1994	Hasanuzzaman Khan	
1995	Nizam Uddin Ahmed	
1996	Md. Kamruzzaman	
1997	Santosh Gupta; Munajatuddin	
1998	Rokonuzzaman Khan; Abul Kashem Sandwip	
1999	ABM Musa; Khondakar Golam Mustafa	
2000	Not awarded	
2001	Not awarded	
2002	Serajur Rahman	
2003	Abdul Hamid; Nazim Uddin Mostan	
2004	Enayetullah Khan	
2005	Mashir Hossain	
2006	Gaziul Hasan Khan; Shahadat Chowdhury	
2007	Not awarded	
2008	Not awarded	
2009	Ashraf-uz-Zaman Khan; Manik Chandra Saha; Humayun Kabir Balu	
2010	Mohammad Alam	
2011	Nurjahan Begum	
2012	Ehtesham Haider Chowdhury; Ashfaq Munier Chowdhury	
2013	Not awarded	
2014	Golam Sarwar	
2015	Kamal Lohani	
2016	Toab Khan	
2017	Abul Momen; Swadesh Roy	
2018	Ranesh Moitra	
2019	Not awarded	
2020	Zafar Wazed	
2021	Ajoy Dasgupta	
2022	M. A. Malek	
2023	Shah Alamgir	
2024	Not awarded	
2025	Mahfuz Ullah	
