= Press Institute of Bangladesh =

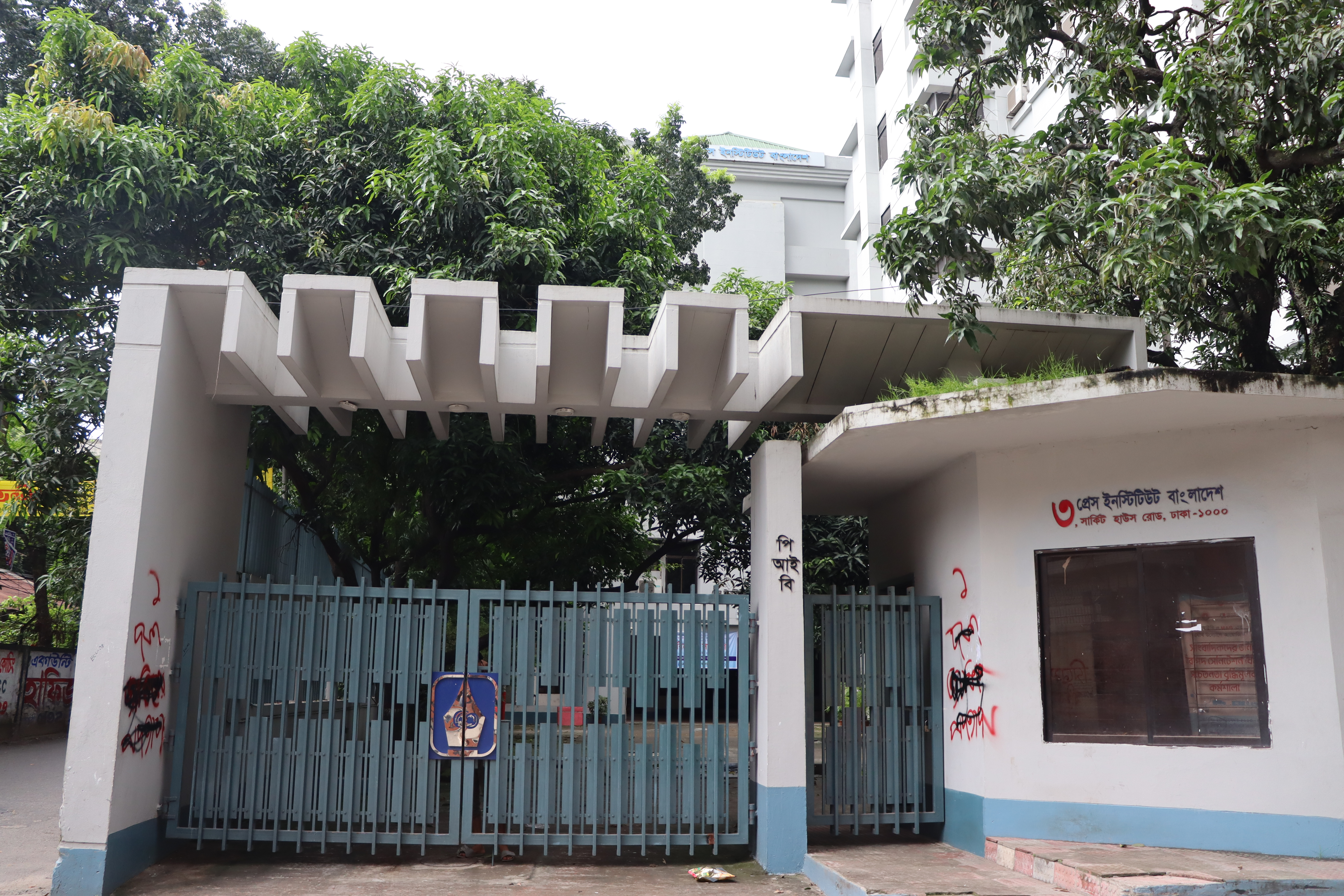
- Headquarters of PIB
- Formation: 1976
- Headquarters: Dhaka, Bangladesh
- Region served: Bangladesh
- Official language: Bengali
- Leader: Faruk Wasif
- Website: Press Institute of Bangladesh

Press Institute of Bangladesh (PIB) is an autonomous national research institute that provides training to Journalists and carries out research on mass media and journalism in Bangladesh and is located in Dhaka, Bangladesh. Faruk Wasif is the present Director General of the institute.

== History ==
The institute was established in 1976 by publishing a government gazette notification. As of 2011, the institute has organised 721 training sessions with over 18,000 participants.

In August 2015, Golam Sarwar, editor of the daily Samakal, was appointed chairman of the Press Institute of Bangladesh.

The Director General of the Press Institute of Bangladesh Shah Alamgir died in February 2019 at the Combined Military Hospital, Dhaka. Zafar Wazed was appointed director general in 2019 and had his term extended in 2021.

In June 2021, Enamul Hoque Chowdhury, editor of the Daily Sun, was appointed chairman of the Press Institute of Bangladesh.

After the fall of the Sheikh Hasina-led Awami League government, the interim government reformed the board of the Press Institute of Bangladesh and the Bangladesh Sangbad Sangstha. Professor Firdous Azim and Anower Aldin were named as chairpersons for the Press Institute of Bangladesh and Bangladesh Sangbad Sangstha, respectively. Faruk Wasif was appointed director general of the Press Institute of Bangladesh. Press Institute of Bangladesh operates a fact checking section for the news called BanglaFact. The interim government led by Muhammad Yunus launched BanglaFact and Press Wing Facts under the Chief Adviser’s Press Wing. The government's initiative was criticised for being potentially unconstitutional and an "authoritarian overreach".

== List of chairmen ==
Former Chairmen of the PIB Board
No.	Name	Term	Ref.
1	Syed Murtaza Ali	19 November 1976 – 22 March 1981	
2	Abdul Wahab	23 March 1981 – 4 April 1983	
3	Obaid-ul-Haq	5 April 1983 – 31 July 1987	
4	S. A. R. Matin Uddin	1 August 1987 – 31 October 1989	
5	Gazi Shamsur Rahman	1 November 1989 – 17 December 1995	
6	Khondkar Mahbub Uddin Ahmed	18 December 1995 – 4 March 1998	
7	Gaziul Haq	5 March 1998 – 22 March 2003	
8	Sadek Khan	23 March 2003 – 30 July 2007	
9	Habibur Rahman Milon	17 June 2009 – 13 June 2015	
10	Golam Sarwar	24 August 2015 – 12 August 2018	
11	Abed Khan	11 March 2019 – 10 March 2021	
12	Enamul Haque Chowdhury	22 June 2021 – 21 June 2023	
13	Enamul Haque Chowdhury	29 October 2023 – 8 September 2024	

== List of director generals ==
Former Director Generals of the PIB
No.	Name	Term	Ref.
1	Abdus Salam	24 August 1976 – 12 February 1977 (Until 4 November 1976, the title was "Director")	
2	Syed Murtaza Ali (Acting)	13 February 1977 – 31 March 1977	
3	Zainul Abedin (Acting)	1 April 1977 – 6 June 1977	
4	Abdul Wahab	7 June 1977 – 31 October 1978	
5	A. Towab Khan (Acting)	1 November 1978 – 20 March 1981	
6	A. B. M. Musa	21 March 1981 – 15 May 1985	
7	Shahidul Haque	16 May 1985 – 15 May 1987	
8	Lutfur Rahman (Acting)	16 May 1987 – 6 June 1988	
9	Amanullah	7 June 1988 – 31 July 1989	
10	Enamul Haque	1 August 1989 – 31 August 1991	
11	Golam Kibaria (Acting)	1 September 1991 – 29 October 1991	
12	S. M. Ahmed Humayun	30 October 1991 – 31 October 1992	
13	Dr. M. Touhidul Anwar	1 November 1992 – 31 July 1996	
14	Kazi Abdul Bayes (Additional Charge)	1 August 1996 – 14 September 1996	
15	Fariduddin Ahmed (Additional Charge)	15 September 1996 – 24 September 1996	
16	Dr. Sheikh Abdus Salam	25 September 1996 – 24 September 2001	
17	Md. Asadul Haque (Additional Charge)	25 September 2001 – 28 October 2001	
18	Md. Abdul Hannan (Additional Charge)	29 October 2001 – 25 June 2002	
19	Syed Shah Alam (Additional Charge)	26 June 2002 – 8 September 2002	
20	Mohammad Afsar Uddin (Additional Charge)	18 September 2002 – 23 September 2002	
21	A. H. M. Shamsul Islam (Additional Charge)	24 September 2002 – 28 September 2002	
22	Dr. Rezoan Hossain Siddiqui	29 September 2002 – 28 September 2006	
23	Sheikh Abdul Gaffar	16 October 2006 – 17 October 2006	
24	Dr. Abdul Hai Siddiqui	18 October 2006 – 4 November 2006	
25	Mridula Bhattacharya	9 November 2006 – 20 November 2007	
26	Syed Md. Haider Ali	21 November 2007 – 3 January 2008	
27	Mohammad Nazrul Islam, NDC	3 January 2008 – 16 April 2009	
28	Md. Jahangir Hossain (Additional Charge)	16 April 2009 – 27 April 2009	
29	A. K. M. Shamim Chowdhury (Acting)	27 April 2009 – 18 February 2010	
30	Md. Abu Bakar Siddique (Additional Charge)	19 February 2010 – 20 May 2010	
31	Dulal Chandra Biswas	20 May 2010 – 18 May 2013	
32	Abdul Mannan (Additional Charge)	30 May 2013 – 6 July 2013	
33	Md. Shah Alamgir	7 July 2013 – 28 February 2019	
34	Mir Md. Nazrul Islam (Additional Charge)	27 February 2019 – 20 April 2019	
35	Zafar Wazed	21 April 2019 – 19 August 2024	
36	Abul Kalam Mohammad Shamsuddin (Routine Duty)	22 August 2024 – 3 September 2024	
