= Enamul Hoque Chowdhury =

Bangladeshi journalist

- এনামুল হক চৌধুরী

Chairman of the Press Institute of Bangladesh
- In office 22 June 2021 – 21 June 2023
- Preceded by: Abed Khan
- Succeeded by: Himself
- In office 29 October 2023 – 8 September 2024
- Preceded by: Himself
- Succeeded by: Professor Firdous Azim

Personal details
- Occupation: Journalist, Editor

Enamul Hoque Chowdhury is a Bangladeshi journalist and the former chairman of the Press Institute of Bangladesh. He is also the former editor of the Daily Sun, a prominent English-language daily newspaper in Bangladesh. He was the Minister (Press) at Bangladesh High Commission in New Delhi.

Chowdhury has had a distinguished career in journalism, working with several national and international news agencies and media outlets. He has worked for Bangladesh Sangbad Sangstha, The Bangladesh Observer, Daily News (now defunct), The Independent, Desh TV, Reuters, and bdnews24.com.

== Career ==
Chowdhury, then a journalist with Bangladesh Sangbad Sangstha and Reuters, was arrested in December 2002 for allegedly fabricating a quote linking al-Qaeda to deadly bombings in Mymensingh. Reuters retracted related stories, BSS fired him, and police accused him of harming the nation's image and filed charges under the Special Powers Act. Though Chowdhury admitted misattributing the quote, he denied criminal intent; legal proceedings and concerns over his treatment in custody followed.

Chowdhury was among 40 individuals, including Awami League political leaders and intellectuals, wrongfully detained and tortured following the 2002 Mymensingh cinema bombings. Later investigations confirmed that three militants from the banned Jama'atul Mujahideen Bangladesh were responsible for the attacks, which killed 21 and injured around 200. Chowdhury, who was dismissed from Bangladesh Sangbad Sangstha without a proper investigation, has since demanded reinstatement and compensation for the injustice he faced.

In June 2009, Chowdhury was appointed Minister (Press) at the Bangladesh High Commission, New Delhi, handling diplomatic media affairs, for a two-year term. His appointment was extended multiple times, including a one-year extension in May 2015.

Chowdhury was also a commissioner at the National Human Rights Commission of Bangladesh from 2 August 2016 to 2 August 2019. In May 2017, he was summoned by the High Court Division, which sought evidence on a report by his newspaper. Chowdhury condemned the 2016 Nasirnagar violence as a planned attempt to drive out the Hindu minorities and grab their land. He led a National Human Rights Commission of Bangladesh delegation to the affected areas and criticized the inaction of local authorities. Chowdhury stated the coordinated nature of the violence resembled atrocities from the 1971 Liberation War and called for a judicial probe to identify those responsible.

Chowdhury was appointed chairman of the newly formed 15-member Press Institute of Bangladesh board in June 2021 by the Ministry of Information and Broadcasting for two years. In August 2021, he was named in a defamation case filed by member of parliament and whip, Shamsul Haque Chowdhury. In May 2022, he was appointed a syndicate board member of the World University of Bangladesh. He is a member of the Bangladesh Sports Journalists Association.

On 20 August 2024, Chowdhury's office was attacked and vandalized for 20 minutes along with other media offices at the East West Media Group complex.
