= Jinbodhi Bhikkhu =

- জিনবোধি ভিক্ষু
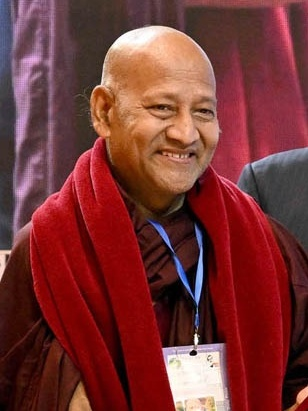
- Bhikkhu receiving 2024 Ekushey Padak
- Born: Rangunia, Chittagong
- Education: University of Chittagong; University of Calcutta

Jinbodhi Bhikkhu is a Bangladeshi professor who teaches in the Department of Pali at the University of Chittagong. He was awarded the Ekushey Padak by the Government of Bangladesh in 2024 for his special contribution to education.

== Early life and career ==
Jinbodhi Bhikkhu was born in Rangunia, Chittagong. He received his undergraduate and postgraduate degrees from the Department of Pali at the University of Chittagong. He then earned a PhD degree from the University of Calcutta and joined the same department at the University of Chittagong as a teacher.

As a teacher at the University of Chittagong, Bhikkhu played an important role in the construction of the university's 'Bangamata Sheikh Fazilatunnesa Mujib Hall' and 'Atish Dipankar Hall'.

In addition to teaching, Bhikkhu is also involved in research on Buddhist philosophy. A book he wrote on this topic, titled 'Prajnatattva and Vimuktimārga in Buddhist Philosophy', has been published by Bangla Academy. In addition, another book titled 'In the Thought of the Father of the Nation Bangabandhu Sheikh Mujib Centenary' was published in 2023. He is a member of the International Association of Buddhist Studies. He has served as a visiting professor at the University of Delhi and the University of Oxford.

== Award ==
Bhikkhu was awarded the Ekushey Padak by the government of Bangladesh in 2024 and awarded the 'Bangladesh Buddhist Sangha Award' and the 'Ananda Maitreya Award'.
