= Abdul Mazid (researcher) =

Bangladeshi fisheries researcher

Doctor Abdul Mazid
- Awards: Ekushey Padak-2023

Abdul Mazid is a Bangladeshi fisheries researcher who is the founding Director General of the Bangladesh Fisheries Research Institute. In 2023, the Government of Bangladesh awarded him for the Ekushey Padak in Research.

== Career ==
Abdul Majid worked for four years as a fish processing specialist at the United Nations Industrial Development Organization. He served for 15 years as the Founder Director General of Bangladesh Fisheries Research Institute (BFRI). He is a Fellow of Bangladesh Academy of Agriculture (BAAG).
