= List of Bangladeshi films of 1979 =

A list of Bangladesh films released in 1979.

== Releases ==
| Title | Director | Cast | Genre | Release date | Notes | Ref(s) |
|---|---|---|---|---|---|---|
| Surja Dighal Bari | Masiuddin Shaker | Rawshan Jamil, Dolly Anwar, ATM Shamsuzzaman, Jahurul Alam | Drama | 1979 Jan 26 | Based on the novel of Abu Ishaque | |
| Rupali Saikate | Alamgir Kabir | Bulbul Ahmed, Jayasree Kabir, Anwar Hossain, Sharmili Ahmed | | 1979 Mar 20 | | |
| The Father | Kazi Hayat(debut) | Bulbul Ahmed, Suchorita | | 1979 Mar 28 | | |
| Matir Ghor | Azizur Rohman | Shabana | Drama | 1979 Jun 1 | Shabana's first produced film | |
| Surjo Songram | Abdus Samad | Anwar Hossain, Rosy Samad, Zafar Iqbal, Faruk, Bobita, Golam Mustofa | Drama | 1979 Jun 29 | | |
| Nagordola | Belal Ahmed (debut) | Faruk, Suchorita, Anwar Hossain, Rosy Samad | | 1979 Jul 30 | | |

== See also ==
- 1979 in Bangladesh
- List of Bangladeshi films of 1980
- List of Bangladeshi films
- Cinema of Bangladesh
