= Dalia Nausheen =

Bangladeshi Nazrul Sangeet singer (1954/1955–2026)

Dalia Nausheen ডালিয়া নওশিন
- Born: 1954 or 1955
- Died: 1 April 2026 (aged 71) Dhaka, Bangladesh
- Genres: Nazrul Sangeet
- Occupation: Singer
- Instrument: Vocals

Dalia Nausheen (1954 or 1955 – 1 April 2026) was a Bangladeshi Nazrul Sangeet singer. She was one of the artists who participated in the Swadhin Bangla Betar Kendra during the Bangladesh Liberation War in 1971. In recognition of her contribution to music, the government of Bangladesh awarded her the country's second highest civilian award Ekushey Padak in 2020.

Nausheen started practising North Indian Classical music and Nazrul Sangeet at the age of five. Her father Muzharul Islam, a noted architect in South Asia, also inspired her to the music. Sudhin Das was her first teacher. She completed her five-year music course in 1973 from Chhayanaut where she was taught by Sohrab Hossain, Sheikh Luthfur Rahman and Ustad Ful Muhammed. Later, she joined the same institution as a teacher.

Nausheen died of cancer in Dhaka, on 1 April 2026, at the age of 71.

== Awards ==
- Ekushey Padak (2020)
