= Amanullah (journalist) =

Bangladeshi politician (born 1936)

- Born: December 31, 1936 (age 89)
- Education: M.A. in Political Science, Dhaka University (1957)
- Occupations: Journalist, editor, politician

Amanullah (born 31 December 1936) is a Bangladeshi journalist, editor, and politician. Over a career spanning more than four decades, he served as editor of several leading newspapers and news agencies, including multiple terms as managing director and chief editor of the national news agency Bangladesh Sangbad Sangstha (BSS). He also played an active role in politics as a member of the Bangladesh Nationalist Party and headed its Patuakhali district unit.

== Early life and education ==
Amanullah was born on 31 December 1936 in Barishal. He earned a master's degree in political science from Dhaka University in 1957. In 1965–1966, he was awarded a Congressional Fellowship of the American Political Science Association, which brought him to Washington, D.C. He attained proficiency in English, studied French, and acquired basic knowledge of Arabic and Urdu.

== Career in journalism ==
Amanullah began his journalism career at The Morning News in 1958 as an apprentice sub-editor, moving shortly afterward to the Associated Press of Pakistan (APP), where he held senior roles as chief reporter, news editor, and special correspondent.

In 1971, on the eve of the Bangladesh Liberation War, he resigned from APP and later joined the newly established PPI News Agency as deputy general manager and Dhaka bureau chief. In 1972, he became managing director and chief editor of the Bangladesh Press International (BPI).

Over subsequent decades, Amanullah held leading editorial positions including:

- Chief Editor and General Manager of Bangladesh Sangbad Sangstha (BSS) (1975–1977; 1989–1991)
- Director General of the Press Institute of Bangladesh (PIB) (1988–1989)
- Chief Editor of The New Nation (1996–1997)
- Founder Editor of The Sunday Star (1980–1981)
- Chairman of the Editorial Board of the Daily Aamar Bangla (2001–2005)

He also worked as a correspondent for international outlets such as Voice of America, The Daily Telegraph (London), United Press International (UPI), and Kuwait News Agency (KUNA). Despite being appointed a senior editor at the International Islamic News Agency in Jeddah in 1978, he was unable to join due to visa complications.

=== International coverage and assignments ===
Throughout his career, Amanullah reported on numerous significant international events, including the First Islamic Summit Conference in Rabat in 1969, the Fifth Islamic Summit in Kuwait in 1985, and Islamic Foreign Ministers’ Conferences held in Dhaka and Cairo. He also covered official visits of political leaders, such as the 1966 visit of Indian prime minister Indira Gandhi to Washington, D.C., as well as several visits by Pakistani leaders abroad. In addition to these high-profile assignments, he undertook extensive reporting duties in countries such as Turkey, Syria, Jordan, Lebanon, Egypt, and Burma (Myanmar), and traveled widely across North America, Europe, the Middle East, and Asia.

== Political involvement ==
In January 1991, Amanullah resigned from his position at BSS to join the Bangladesh Nationalist Party (BNP). Though unable to secure a parliamentary nomination, he campaigned for BNP candidates and was elected President of the party’s Patuakhali district branch. After five years, he stepped back from active politics but continued as a party member while resuming his journalism career.

== Professional and civic roles ==
He twice served on the Journalists’ Wage Board, representing employers as chief of BSS. In addition, he was president of the South Bengal Development Council, reflecting his interest in regional development.

== Legacy ==
Amanullah is regarded as a leading figure in Bangladeshi journalism for his decades of service across national and international media outlets. His dual contributions in journalism and politics highlight his role in shaping both public discourse and civic engagement in post-independence Bangladesh.
