= Md. Saidul Haque =

Bangladeshi social worker

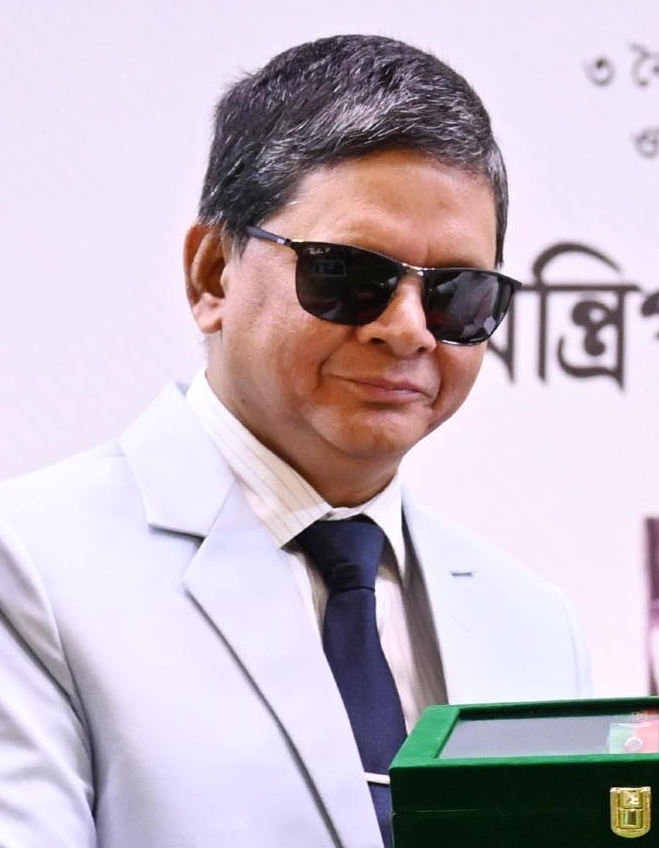
- Haque in 2026
- Awards: Ekushey Padak (2023); Independence Award (2026)

Md. Saidul Haque (Bengali: মো. সাইদুল হক) is a Bangladeshi social worker who is the executive director of the Blind Education and Rehabilitation Development Organisation (BERDO) and president of Jatiyo Protibondhi Unnayan Foundation (JPUF). In 2023, the Government of Bangladesh nominated him for the Ekushe Padak for social service. In 2026, he was awarded Independence Award, the highest civilian honour of Bangladesh.

== Awards ==
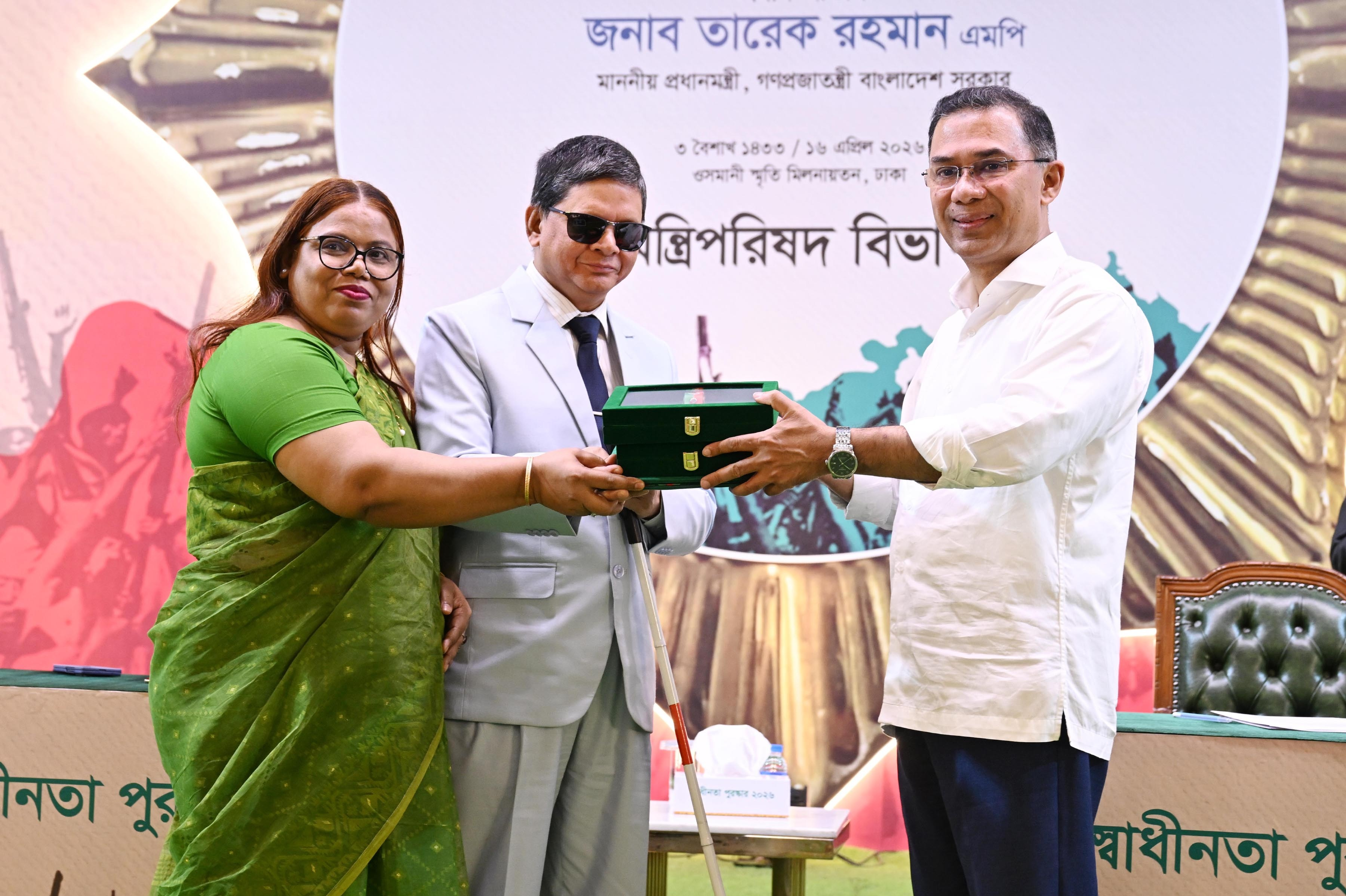
Saidul Haque receives Independence Award 2026 from Prime Minister Tarique Rahman

- Ekushey Padak (20230
- Independence Award (2026)
