= Shuvro Dev =

Bangladeshi Musician

- শুভ্র দেব
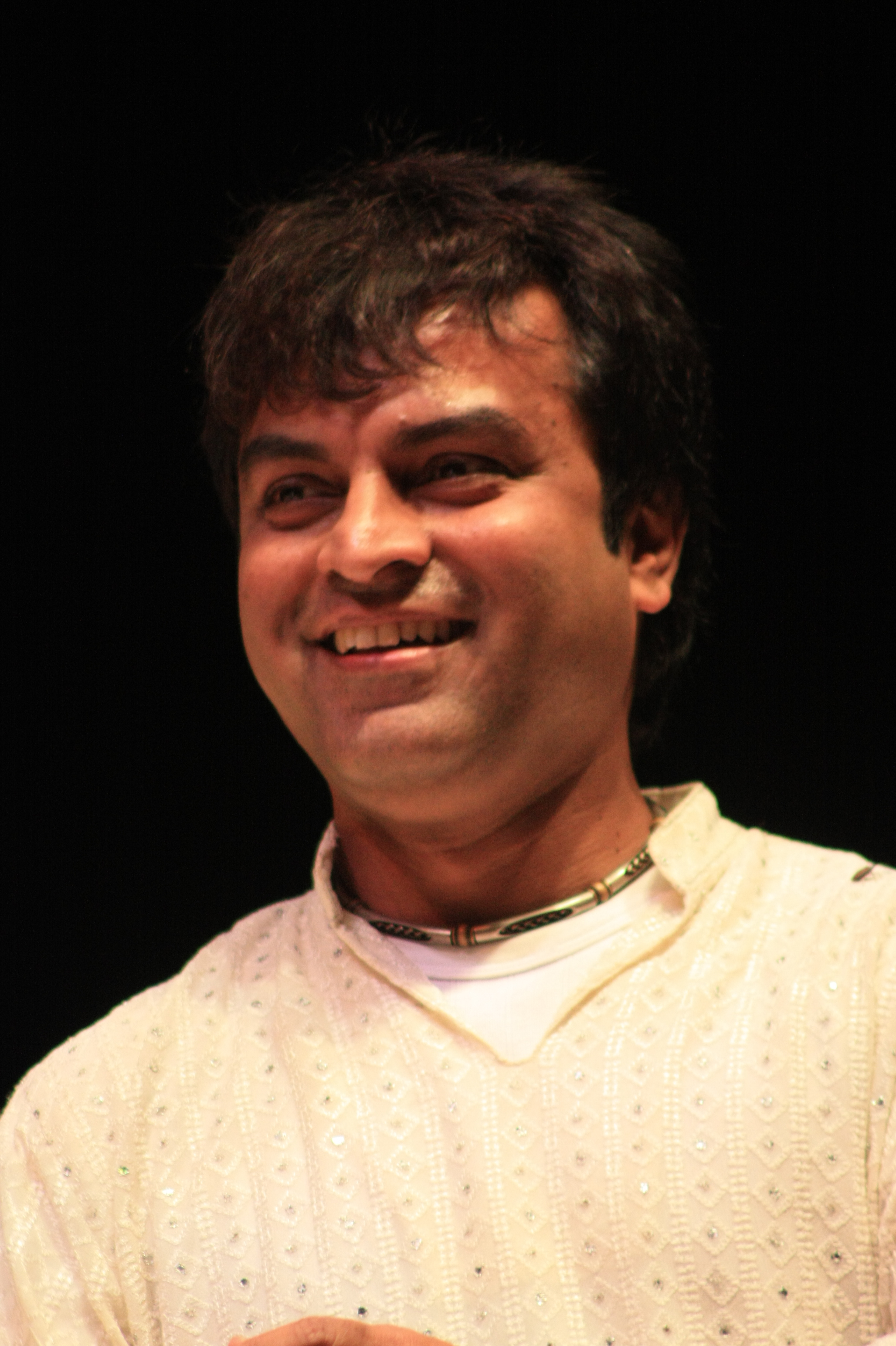
- Dev in 2011
- Born: 26 August 1966 (age 60); Sylhet, Bangladesh ,
- Education: University of Dhaka (MSc)
- Musical career
- Genre: Pop
- Occupations: Singer-songwriter, music director, composer
- Instrument: Vocals
- Years active: 1978–present

Shuvro Dev (Bengali: শুভ্র দেব; born 26 August 1966) is a Bangladeshi musician. He was honoured with Ekushey Padak in 2024, the second-highest civilian award in Bangladesh, for his contribution to music.

== Background ==
Born in Sylhet, Dev passed the matriculation exam from Sylhet Government Pilot High School. He completed his MSc in biochemistry from the University of Dhaka. He received the President's Award in music on BTV's "Nutun Kuri" contest in 1978.

== Career ==
Dev started his career in the mid-1980s and sang modern romantic songs. He released his first music album Hemiloner Bashiwala in 1984. He also performed duet songs with another Bangladeshi singer, Shakila Zafar. He has sung with duet with Indian singer Alka Yagnik. He was one of the first Bangladeshi artists chosen to have music videos produced by MTV. His telefilm Strir Potro won the best telefilm award at the 2003 Uro Binodon Bichitra Awards.

== Discography ==
As of June 2014, Dev released total 25 albums. Some of them are “Hamiloner Banshiwala”, “Jewel Shmoroney”, “Jey Banshi Bhengey Gechhey”, “Kono Ek Shondhaye”, “Chhowa”, “Shesh Chithi”, “Shada Kagoj”, “Amar Bhalobasha”, “Buk-er Jomin”, “Priyojon”, “Bondhon”, “Bhabtey Parina”, “Mon-e Porey”, “Chompaboti”, “Mon-er Thikana”, “Lolita”, “Swapnolokey Tumi”, “Sharthopor”, and “Tumi Aar Ami”.

His album Lolita was composed by Bidit Lal Das.
