= Zafar Wazed =

Bangladeshi journalists

- জাফর ওয়াজেদ

Director General of PIB
- Incumbent
- Assumed office 21 April 2019
- Preceded by: Shah Alamgir
- Succeeded by: Faruk Wasif

Personal details
- Born: Comilla
- Spouse: Dilshan
- Children: 2
- Education: University of Dhaka
- Awards: Ekushey Padak (2020)

Ali Wazed Zafar (known as Zafar Wazed) is a Bangladeshi journalist. He is former Director General of the Press Institute of Bangladesh (PIB). In recognition of his contribution to journalism, the government of Bangladesh awarded him the country's second highest civilian award Ekushey Padak in 2020.

Zafar was born at Daudkandi in Cumilla. He graduated from the University of Dhaka and became involved in journalism. He served as the literary affairs secretary of the Dhaka University Central Students' Union (DUCSU). On 27 April 2019, the government of Bangladesh appointed him as the director general of the Press Institute of Bangladesh.

In 2020, Zafar was awarded the Ekushey Padak in Journalism.

Following the fall of the Sheikh Hasina led Awami League government his press accreditations were revoked by the new interim government in October 2024.

== See also ==
- List of winners of the Ekushey Padak in Journalism
