= Faruk Wasif =

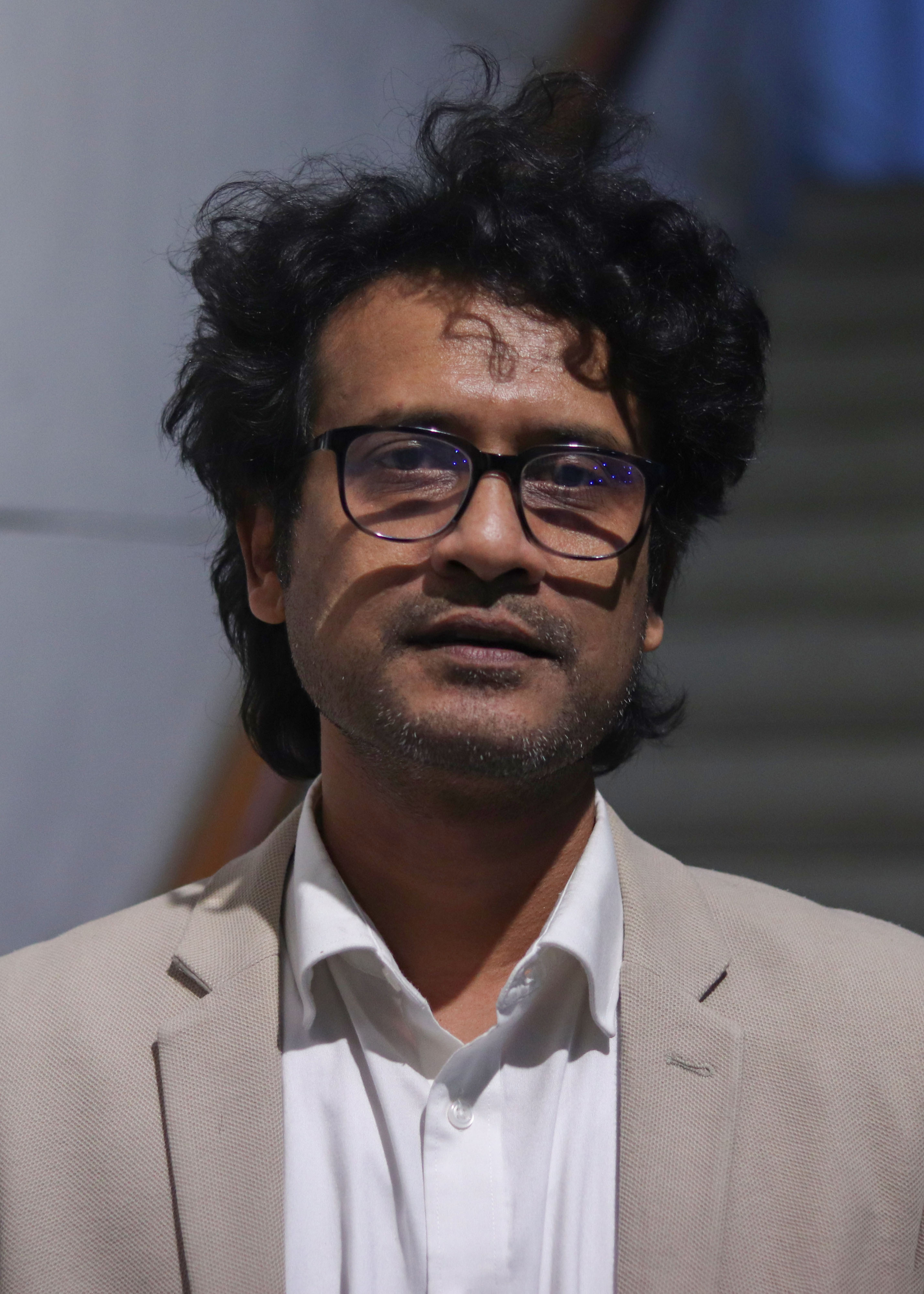
- Born: 22 September 1975 (age 50); Bogra District, Bangladesh
- Education: Jahangirnagar University
- Occupation: Journalism
- Employer: Director General
- Organization: Press Institute of Bangladesh
- Known for: Journalist

Faruk Wasif (born 22 September 1975) is a Bangladeshi journalist, author and poet who has served as the Director General of the Press Institute of Bangladesh (PIB) since his appointment in September 2024. He has worked as an editor and senior journalist at several leading Bangladeshi newspapers and is known for his writing on media, society and contemporary affairs.

== Early life and education ==
He was born on 22 September 1975 at Bogra District. He complete his honor's and master from Jahangirnagar University.

== Career ==
Faruk Wasif built his career in print journalism and editorial work. Before his appointment to PIB, he worked in senior editorial roles; multiple reports identify him with the Daily Samakal as a planning editor. Before that He worked as Assistent Editor of Prothom Alo from 2008-2021, Executive Editor of Protichinta Journal from 2022-2023. He has also been associated with other national publications during his journalistic career and is active as a writer and poet. He was appointed Director General of the Press Institute of Bangladesh (PIB) in a gazette notification issued by the government on 18 September 2024; the appointment was reported as a two-year term. He succeeded Zafar Wazed in the post.

== Published Book ==
- Joruri Obashtar Amalnama, 2009 (জরুরি অবস্থার আমলনামা, শুদ্ধস্বর, ২০০৯)
- Itihaser Karun Kothin Cayapother Dine, 2011 (ইতিহাসের করুণ কঠিন ছায়াপাতের দিনে, শুদ্ধস্বর, ২০১১)
- Saddamer Sesh Jobanbondhi, 2013 (সাদ্দামের শেষ জবানবন্দি, প্রথমা প্রকাশনী, ২০১৩)
- Jol Joba Joytun, 2015 (জল জবা জয়তুন, আগামী প্রকাশন, ২০১৫)
- Basonar Rajniti, Kalpanar Shima, 2016 (বাসনার রাজনীতি, কল্পনার সীমা [আগামী প্রকাশনী, ২০১৬])
- Bishmoroner Chabuk, 2018 (বিস্মরণের চাবুক [আগামী প্রকাশন, ২০১৮])
- Jibonanander Mayabastab, 2018 (জীবনানন্দের মায়াবাস্তব [আগামী প্রকাশনী, ২০১৮])
- Tomoha Pathor, 2019 (তমোহা পাথর [প্রথমা, ২০১৯])

== Writing and other work ==
In addition to his newspaper career, Faruk Wasif is described in several profiles as an author and poet. He has written essays and opinion pieces on political and social topics; he has also been recorded as taking part in public literary and civic activities.
