= Rupa Chakraborty =

Bangladeshi elocutionist

- রূপা চক্রবর্তী
- Occupation: Elocutionist

Rupa Chakraborty (Bengali: রূপা চক্রবর্তী) is a Bangladeshi elocutionist. He was awarded the Ekushey Padak in 2024 by the government of Bangladesh in the recitation category.

== Career ==
Chakraborty is an associate professor in the Department of Bengali Language and Literature at University of Dhaka.

== Honours ==
Year	Awards	Category	ref.
2024	Ekushey Padak	Recitation	
