= Shahjahan Ahmed Bikash =

- Occupation: painters

Shahjahan Ahmed Bikash is a Bangladeshi painter. He was awarded Ekushey Padak by the government of Bangladesh in 2024 in the fine arts category.

As of 2024 he was the chairman of Faculty of Fine Arts at University of Development Alternative (UDA), a private university.
