= Khaleda Manzoor-e-Khuda =

Bangladeshi activist

Khaleda Manzur-i-Khuda
- খালেদা মনযূর-এ-খুদা
- Born: 1933; 24 Parganas, Bengal Presidency, British India
- Died: 25 March 2023 (aged 89); Dhaka, Bangladesh
- Education: University of Dhaka

Khaleda Manzur-i-Khuda (1933 – 25 March 2023) was a Bangladeshi activist. She was awarded Ekushey Padak in 2023 for her contribution to the Bengali language movement of 1952.

== Background and career ==
Khaleda Manzur-i-Khuda was born in 1933 in Srirampur, British India. She graduated with a master's degree in philosophy from the University of Dhaka and a master's in Comparative Religions from University of Concordia, Montreal, Canada.

During the Bengali language movement on 21 February 1952, she ran efforts in running a blood drive for the injured protesters at a procession outside Dhaka Medical College Hospital. She presented a women's issues-centric program on Bangladesh Television. She sang on Pakistan Radio in East Pakistan in the 1950s.

Khaleda Manzur-i-Khuda established a finishing school, Grihini Shilpokola Academy. She also established Sunrise Kindergarten school in 1976. She was a permanent member of Bangla Academy. In 2005, she was awarded the Lekhika Sangha Gold Medal for her contributions to writing.

Khaleda Manzur-i-Khuda established a gold medal award for outstanding students at the department of philosophy at the University of Dhaka.

Khaleda Manzur-i-Khuda was the wife of Dr. Manzur-i-Khuda, son of Dr. Muhammad Qudrat-i-Khuda, a Bangladeshi scientist and educator. She has a son Khaled Raihan-i-Khuda and three daughters, Nasreen Mehr-e-Khuda, Shama-i-Khuda and Nausheen Manzur-i-Khuda.
