= Bangladesh at the AFC Asian Cup =

Bangladesh is one of two South Asian teams, the other being India, to have participated in the AFC Asian Cup. They qualified for the main phase of the tournament successfully on their first attempt during the 1980 AFC Asian Cup held in Kuwait. They failed to win any of their four games during the tournament, with Kazi Salahuddin and Ashrafuddin Ahmed Chunnu being the only goal scorers for Bangladesh in the competition. To date, this remains the nation's only appearance in the tournament.

== Overall Record ==
AFC Asian Cup										Qualification					
Year	Result	Position	Pld	W	D	L	GF	GA	Squad	Pld	W	D	L	GF	GA
(Hong Kong) 1956 to (Iran) 1968	Part of Pakistan									Part of Pakistan					
(Thailand) 1972	Not an AFC member									Not an AFC member					
(Iran) 1976	Withdrew									Withdrew					
(Kuwait) 1980	Group stage	10th	4	0	0	4	2	17	Squad	4	1	2	1	7	8
(Singapore) 1984	Did not qualify									5	1	0	4	6	13
(Qatar) 1988	Did not qualify									5	0	3	2	1	9
(Japan) 1992	Did not qualify									2	0	0	2	0	7
(United Arab Emirates) 1996	Withdrew									Withdrew					
(Lebanon) 2000	Did not qualify									4	1	1	2	5	12
(China) 2004	Did not qualify									2	0	1	1	3	4
(Indonesia) (Malaysia) (Thailand) (Vietnam) 2007	Did not qualify									8	1	1	6	2	19
(Qatar) 2011	Did not qualify									AFC Challenge Cup					
(Australia) 2015	Did not qualify									AFC Challenge Cup					
(United Arab Emirates) 2019	Did not qualify									12	0	2	10	3	41
(Qatar) 2023	Did not qualify									13	1	3	9	6	27
Total	Group stage	1/18	4	0	0	4	2	17	—	55	5	13	37	33	140

== 1980 Asian Cup ==
The county's first opposition was Asian giants North Korea. Regardless of coming into the game as huge underdogs, the team played attacking football against the Koreans. Bangladesh conceded in the 44th and 45th minutes of the match, both due to defensive blunders. Despite the letdown, the team kept on pressing and following a quick counterattack after winning the ball back from the Korean defense, Bangladesh earned a penalty. Kazi Salahuddin converted the penalty in the 60th minute to score the country's first ever major tournament goal. However, the Koreans did not let the celebrations last long, scoring again in the 88th minute after goalkeeper Pintu spilled the ball, leaving the net empty. In the 90th minute a curling effort from Ashrafuddin Ahmed Chunnu made the final score 3–2. In their second game three days later against Syria, Bangladesh suffered a 1–0 defeat, with Jamal Keshek scoring the only goal.

In their third game, Bangladesh were thrashed 7–0 by defending champions Iran. Within 35 minutes into the game, Bangladesh fell 3 goal behind. Their plan of taking Iran head-on failed as their opponents dominated in midfield during the first half. In the second half, the opposition's constant attacking pressure led to Behtash Fariba scoring from a corner in the 80th minute. Iran scored again within 2 minutes of the restart when Fariba again found the net from close range, subsequently completing his quadruple of goals. The last match of the group-stage saw Bangladesh concede 6 against China. Hat-tricks from Shen Xiangfu and Xu Yonglai ended the nation's AFC campaign on a disappointing note. Despite not winning a single game in the competition, Bangladesh's on-field performances were fairly satisfactory, especially considering it was their first major tournament appearance, just four years after the founding of the Bangladesh Football Federation.

=== Group A ===
Pos	Team	Pld	W	D	L	GF	GA	GD	Pts	Qualification
1	Iran	4	2	2	0	12	4	+8	6	Advance to knockout stage
2	North Korea	4	3	0	1	9	7	+2	6	Advance to knockout stage
3	Syria	4	2	1	1	3	2	+1	5	
4	China	4	1	1	2	9	5	+4	3	
5	Bangladesh	4	0	0	4	2	17	−15	0	

Source: RSSSF
16 September 1980

North Korea	3–2	Bangladesh
Choi Jae-pil 44', 45'; Kim Jong-man 88'		Salahuddin 60' (pen.); Chunnu 90'

Sabah Al-Salem Stadium, Kuwait City
Attendance: 200

19 September 1980

Bangladesh	0–1	Syria
		Keshek 7'

Sabah Al-Salem Stadium, Kuwait City
Attendance: 1,500

22 September 1980

Bangladesh	0–7	Iran
		Fariba 11', 34', 80', 82'; Roshan 21'; Barzegari 27', 87'

Sabah Al-Salem Stadium, Kuwait City
Attendance: 2,000

25 September 1980

China	6–0	Bangladesh
Shen Xiangfu; Xu Yonglai

Sabah Al-Salem Stadium, Kuwait City
Attendance: 500

== Record by Opponent ==
AFC Asian Cup matches head-to-head record
Opponent	Played	Wins	Draws	Losses	Goals for	Goals against	Goal difference	Points
North Korea	1	0	0	1	2	3	–1	0
Syria	1	0	0	1	0	1	–1	0
Iran	1	0	0	1	0	7	–7	0
China	1	0	0	1	0	6	–6	0
Total	4	0	0	4	2	17	−15	0

== Goalscorers ==
No.	Player	Venue	Opponent	Score	Result	Date	Edition	Goals	Ref.
1	Kazi Salahuddin	Sabah Al Salem Stadium, Kuwait City	North Korea	1–2	2–3	16 September 1980	1980	1	
2	Ashrafuddin Ahmed Chunnu	Sabah Al Salem Stadium, Kuwait City	North Korea	2–3	2–3	16 September 1980	1980	1	
