= Rokeya Sultana (artist) =

Bangladeshi artist

- রোকেয়া সুলতানা
- Born: 1958 (age 67–68); Chittagong, East Pakistan, Pakistan
- Awards: Full list
- Website: rokeyasultana-bd.com

Rokeya Sultana (born 1958) is a Bangladeshi artist. She serves as a professor at the Department of Printmaking, Faculty of Fine Arts, University of Dhaka. She was awarded 2025 Ekushey Padak, the second highest civilian award of Bangladesh, in the painting category.

== Background and education ==
Rokeya Sultana was born 1958 in Chittagong in the then East Pakistan (now Bangladesh). She earned her BFA degree in printmaking from the Institute of Fine Arts (now Faculty of Fine Arts, University of Dhaka) in 1980 and MFA from Visva-Bharati University in Shantiniketan, India in 1983.

Sultana earned a Fulbright research grant to work as a resident artist for nine months at the University of Nebraska–Lincoln, United States in 2012. She earned a residency scholarship to L’Atelier Lacouriere et Frelaut in Paris in 2003.

== Career ==
Sultana's works are exhibited at the Bangladesh National Museum, National Taiwan Museum of Fine Arts, Academy of Art University in San Francisco and other places.

=== Style ===
Sultana uses fluid and transparent colours. Her artworks focus on the female form, expressing the joys and struggles of womanhood; depicted in her series Madonna, Bonobibi, Flaming Desire, Fata Morgana and Relation.

Madonna is a movement, she is vulnerable because although she is a peacemaker, she is prepared to fight. She is a symbol for all women. She changes throughout time, but she is forever performing the same role. 'Madonna' is a symbol of protest against an unjust society. She is always draped in a magenta shari, because I want to show that she is feminine and rooted in our own traditions, her rebellion is deeper. The colour, magenta, is a symbol of transforming negativity through the feminine psyche. Magenta is on the verge of being an aggressive form of red, but it is softer, more playful and more positive. 'Madonna' is every girl and every woman.

– Interview with The Daily Star in 2020

== Awards ==
- Ekushey Padak (2025)
- Bengal Foundation Award at the 14th National Art Exhibition, Dhaka (1999)
- Grand Prize at the 3rd Bharat Bhaban Print Biennale, India (1995)
- Purchase Award at Somerstown Gallery, 4th Biennial, New York (1992)
