= Anis Siddiqui =

Personal details
- Born: Sheikh Anisullah Siddiqui; 6 April 1934 Dargahpur village, Assasuni, Satkhira, Bengal Presidency, British India. (present-day Bangladesh)
- Died: 25 December 1985 (aged 51) Mohammadpur, Dhaka, Bangladesh.
- Spouse: Zahida Siddika
- Relations: 4 brothers and 2 sisters
- Children: 3
- Parent(s): Sheikh Abdul Aziz, Khodeja Khatun
- Awards: Ekushey Padak (1987)

Anis Siddiqui (6 April 1934 – 25 December 1985) was a Bangladeshi fiction writer and author. For his contributions to literature, the Government of Bangladesh awarded him the Ekushey Padak, the country's second-highest civilian award, in 1987. He was the first to write novels in Bangladesh dealing with historical events. He is referred to as the father of historical novels.

== Early life and education ==
Anis Siddiqui was born in Dargahpur village in Assasuni Upazila of Satkhira District. His father was Sheikh Abdul Aziz and his mother was Khodeja Khatun. After receiving his primary education at the village madrasa, he enrolled at R K B K H C Institution in 1974 and completed his matriculation in 1951. He completed his education at B. L. College in Daulatpur, Khulna.

== Career ==
Anis Siddiqui began his career as a teacher at Barisal Zilla School. He later taught at Khulna Zilla School. In 1967, he joined Government Laboratory High School in Dhaka.

He wrote historical novels based on prominent figures from the distant and recent past and also wrote books for children. For his contributions to literature, the Government of Bangladesh awarded him the Ekushey Padak, the country's second-highest civilian award, in 1987.

== Works ==
Among the published works of Anis Siddiqui are:

- Mughal Heremer Antarale
- Nirbasita Samrat Bahadur Shah
- Dhakar Itihasik Tragedy
- Sangrami Sukarno
- Jakhon Ami Rani Chhilam
- Samrat Jahangirer Smritikatha

== Awards and honours ==
- Ekushey Padak (1987)

== Death ==
Anis Siddiqui died of a heart attack on 25 December 1985 at his residence, "Shubhechchhay", in Mohammadpur, Dhaka.
