= Golam Sarwar =

Bangladeshi journalist and writer

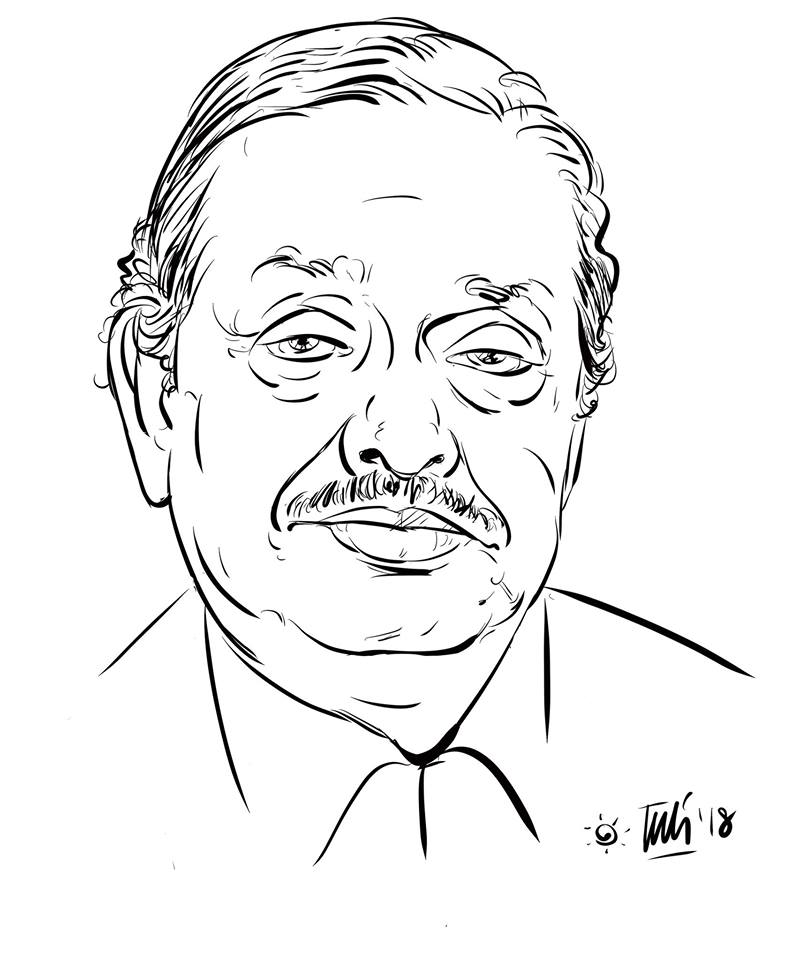
- Born: 1 April 1943; Banaripara, Bengal, British India
- Died: 13 August 2018 (aged 75); Mount Elizabeth Hospital, Singapore
- Education: University of Dhaka
- Awards: Ekushey Padak (2014)

Golam Sarwar (1 April 1943 – 13 August 2018) was a Bangladeshi journalist and writer. He is considered the "LightHouse of journalism" in Bangladesh. He served as the founding editor of Samakal and Jugantor. He was awarded the Ekushey Padak by the government of Bangladesh in 2014.

== Early life and education ==
Sarwar obtained his bachelor's and master's in Bengali literature from the University of Dhaka.

== Career ==
In his student life in 1962, Sarwar started his career as a university correspondent at The Azadi. He also joined The Sangbad as a sub-editor. After the independence of Bangladesh in 1971, he served as the headmaster of Banaripara Union Institution. Later in 1972, he joined The Daily Ittefaq as a senior sub-editor and worked at the newspaper until 1999.

In 1999, Sarwar became the founding editor of Jugantor, and in 2005, he joined Samakal as the founding editor/publisher and served as the editor at the newspaper until his death.

Sarwar had served as the chairman of the board of directors of the Press Institute of Bangladesh (PIB) since August 2015 and a member of the board of directors of Bangladesh Sangbad Sangstha (BSS). He was a member of the Bangladesh Film Censor Board's Appellate Division and had worked as a senior vice-president of the National Press Club several times.

== Published books ==
- Rongin Balloon
- Sompadoker Jobanbondi
- Omiyo Gorol
- Amar Joto Kotha
- Swapna Benche Thak

== Awards ==
- Ekushey Padak, 2014
- Cultural Journalist Forum of Bangladesh (CJFB) lifetime achievement award, 2016
- Ataus Samad Memorial Trust lifetime award, 2017

== Personal life ==
Sarwar was married to Saleha Sarwar. Together they had two sons and a daughter.

== Death ==
Sarwar died on 13 August 2018 while being treated at a hospital in Singapore. He was suffering from pneumonia and lung complications.
