= Shimul Mustapha =

Bangladeshi reciter (born 1965)

- শিমুল মুস্তাফা
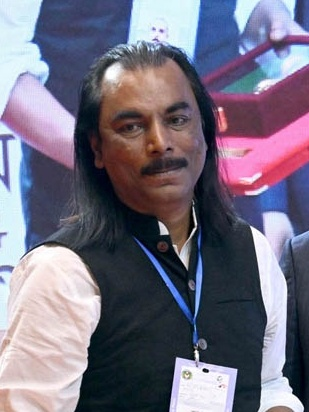
- Mustapha in 2024.
- Born: 17 October 1965 (age 60); Dhaka, East Pakistan, Pakistan
- Education: University of Dhaka
- Years active: 1981–present

Shimul Mustapha (born 17 October 1965) is a Bangladeshi reciter. As of 2016, he has published 41 albums. He was awarded Ekushey Padak by the government of Bangladesh in 2024 in the recitation category.

== Early life ==
Shimul Mustapha was born on 17 October 1965 in Dhaka in the then East Pakistan to Khan Mohammad Golam Mustapha and Afroz Mustapha. Shimul studied in geography and environmental since at the University of Dhaka.

== Career ==
Mustapha has been reciting poems since 1981.

Mustapha often participates in solo recital performances.

== Works ==
- Chithi (1996)
- Tritiyo Ekjon (2014)
- Priyota (2016)
