= Md. Ziaul Haque =

Bangladeshi social worker

- জিয়াউল হক
- Born: 6 June 1934 (age 92); Chapai Nawabganj, Bengal Presidency, British India

Ziaul Haque (born 6 June 1934) is a Bangladeshi social worker. He was awarded Ekushey Padak in 2024 by the government of Bangladesh for his contribution to social service.

== Early life ==
Ziaul Haque was born on 6 June 1934 to Taiyab Ali Mollah, a local dairyman and Sharikun Nessa. Haque married his cousin, Saraban Tohura, in 1958. Together they had two daughters. After the death of Tohura, he married Farida Haque in 2004. He had another son, Mohabbat Haque, with her. Haque lives in Mushribhuja village in Bholahat Upazila, Chapai Nawabganj District.

Haque found a library in his home, "Ziaul Haque General Library", with 14,000 books.

== Awards ==
- "Shada Moner Manush" by Unilever Bangladesh (2005)
- Ekushey Padak (2024)
