= Bhaswar Bandyopadhyay =

- ভাস্বর বন্দ্যোপাধ্যায়
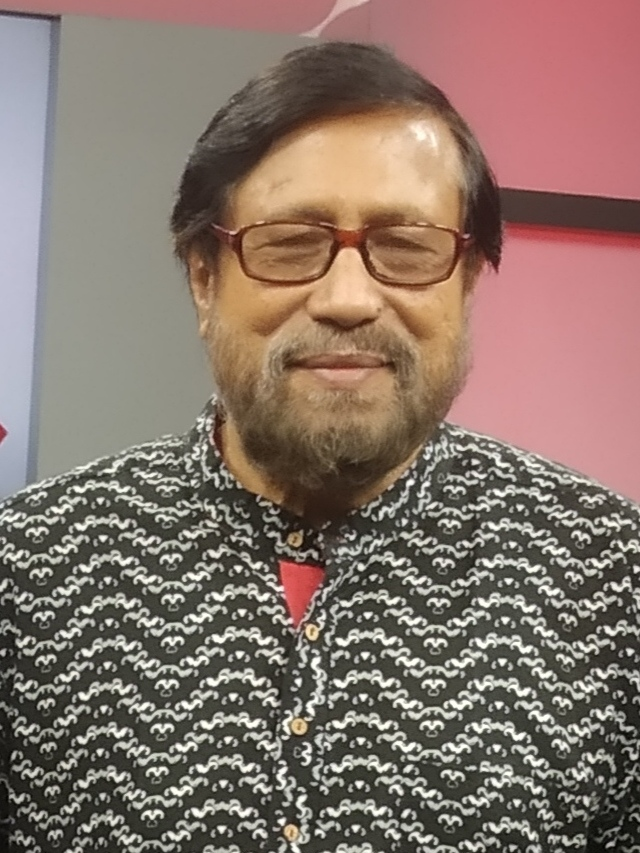
- Bandyopadhyay in 2021
- Education: National School of Drama; University of Dhaka; Rabindra Bharati University

Bhaswar Bandyopadhyay is a Bangladeshi recitation artist, journalist, actor and academic. He was awarded Ekushey Padak in the recitation category in 2021 by the government of Bangladesh. As of 2025, he is a faculty member at the department of film and media studies of Stamford University Bangladesh.

== Education ==
Bandyopadhyay graduated from the National School of Drama at New Delhi, India. He earned his masters in mass Communication and journalism from the University of Dhaka and Ph.D. degree in dramatics from the Rabindra Bharati University, Kolkata, India.

== Career ==
Bandyopadhyay served as the first chairman of Bangladesh Recitation Coordination Council established on 14 April 1988.

Bandyopadhyay hosted the 40th Jatiya Rabindra Sangeet Sammelan in 2022.

== Awards ==
- Golam Mustafa Abritti Padak (Golam Mustafa Recitation Award) (2018)
- Ekushey Padak (2021)
