= Khondokar Ameer Hasan =

Khondokar Ameer Hasan is a Bangladeshi scientist posthumously awarded the Independence Award, the highest civilian award of Bangladesh, in 1980 for his contribution to sciences.
