= Ashrafuddin Ahmad =

Bangladeshi reciter

Ashrafuddin Chowdhury
- Born: Ashrafuddin Ahmed Chowdhury
- Occupation: language movement

Maulvi Ashrafuddin Ahmad is a Bangladeshi reciter. He was awarded the Ekushey Padak in 2024.
