= Moniruzzaman (linguist, University of Chittagong) =

Bangladeshi linguist (1940–2024)

Maniruzzaman
- মনিরুজ্জামান
- Born: 15 February 1940; Bengal Province, British India
- Died: 27 August 2024 (aged 84)
- Education: PhD
- Alma mater: University of Dhaka, University of Mysore

Maniruzzaman, also known as Mohāmmada Manirujjāmāna, (Bengali: মনিরুজ্জামান; 15 February 1940 – 27 August 2024) was a Bangladeshi linguist. He was a Professor of Linguistics at the University of Chittagong. His publications included 36 (thirty six) authored books and 7 (seven) edited books; his writings included poetry, song lyrics, literary criticism and studies of folklore, as well as linguistics. He was awarded the 2015 Bangla Academy Literary Award in the Research category and the 2023 Ekushey Padak in the language and literature category.

== Early life and education ==
Maniruzzaman was born in West Bengal on 15 February 1940. He took his early schooling in Naihati and Kolkata. In 1947 before the Partition of India, his family returned to his father's ancestral village of Adiabad, in Raipura Upazila, now in Narsingdi District, Bangladesh, where he matriculated from Adiabad Islamia High School in 1953 and was admitted to St. Gregory College (later called Notre Dame College, Dhaka). Financial hardship due to the death of his father forced him to withdraw from the college in 1957. He obtained a BA with Honours in Bengali in 1960 from University of Dhaka, and an MA in 1961. His PhD work was conducted under a scholarship at the Central Institute of Indian Languages, Mysore, supervised by Debi Prasanna Pattanayak, and the title of his thesis (1977) is Controlled historical reconstruction based on five Bengali dialects.

== Career ==
Maniruzzaman worked as a teacher in a number of degree colleges between 1961 and 1968, before joining the Bengali Department of Chittagong University in 1968, where he continued teaching until 2008, except for a break to complete his PhD, and to work as a visiting lecturer at the All India Institute of Speech and Hearing in Mysore (1975–1977).

Maniruzzaman also served as Dean of the Faculty of Arts, University of Chittagong (1994–1996), and as Executive Director of the Nazrul Institute, Dhaka (1991–1993).

After retiring he worked as a part-time teacher at Dhaka University (2008–2009).

== Death ==
Maniruzzaman died on 27 August 2024, at the age of 84.

== Works ==
- Mohammad Ali, Mohammad Moniruzzaman, Jahangir Tareque (eds) 1994. Bangla Academy Bengali-English dictionary. The Academy, Dhaka. ISBN 9840731408
