= Nirad Baran Barua =

Ustad Nirad Baran Barua নীরদ বরণ বড়ুয়া
- Born: Nirad Baran Barua; 1936; Abdullapur, Bengal Presidency, British India
- Died: August 9, 2001 (aged 65) Chittagong, Bangladesh
- Education: All-India Music College
- Genre: Hindustani classical music
- Occupations: Classical vocalist; composer; music teacher; playwright
- Instruments: Vocals
- Award: Ekushey Padak (2025, posthumously)

Ustad Nirad Baran Barua (Bengali: নীরদ বরণ বড়ুয়া; 1936 – 9 August 2001), also spelled Nirod Baran Barua, was a Bangladeshi classical vocalist, composer, music director, and teacher. In 2025, he was posthumously awarded the Ekushey Padak, Bangladesh's second-highest civilian honor, for his contributions to music.

== Early life and education ==
Nirad Baran Barua was born in 1936 in the village of Abdullapur in Fatikchhari Upazila, Chittagong District, Bengal Presidency, British India (now in Bangladesh). He was the only son of Nikunja Bihari Barua and Birala Bala Barua.

From an early age, he showed a keen inclination towards North Indian classical music. He studied and completed his graduation in music from the All-India Music College in Calcutta (now Kolkata), where he trained in classical vocal forms including Khayal and Dhrupad. He returned to Chittagong in 1965 to begin his professional music career.

== Musical career ==
Upon returning to Chittagong, Barua devoted himself to practicing, performing, and teaching classical music. He was an exponent of Hindustani classical music in southeastern Bangladesh, performing extensively on Bangladesh Betar (Radio Bangladesh) and at classical music conferences across the country.

In addition to vocal performance, Barua was a composer, lyricist, and playwright. He composed numerous patriotic, spiritual, and devotional songs, as well as musical scores for theatrical stage plays and radio broadcasts in the Chittagong region.

As an educator, Barua established the musical training academy "Sur-Saptak Sangeet Vidyapeeth" in Chittagong, where he trained generations of classical vocalists and performing artists. His disciples and musical heritage continue to be celebrated through commemorative musical conferences organized by organizations such as the Chattogram Classical Music Institute (CCMI) and the Sadarang Uchchanga Sangeet Parishad.

== Awards and recognition ==
In February 2025, the Ministry of Cultural Affairs of the Government of Bangladesh announced Nirad Baran Barua as a recipient of the Ekushey Padak in the field of Music (Shilpakala) posthumously. On 20 February 2025, Chief Adviser Muhammad Yunus formally presented the award at the Osmani Memorial Auditorium in Dhaka, which was accepted on his behalf by his daughter, vocalist Falguni Barua.

== Death and legacy ==
Nirad Baran Barua died on 9 August 2001 in Chittagong, Bangladesh. His death anniversary is observed annually by classical musicians, cultural academies, and students in Chittagong through memorial recitals and musical tributes.
