= Zahir Uddin (activist) =

Bangladeshi social worker

Zahir Uddin is a Bangladeshi social worker who had received the Independence Award, the highest civilian award of Bangladesh, for his contribution to social work in 1980 posthumously.
