= Bande Ali Mia =

- বন্দে আলী মিঞা
- Born: 17 January 1906; Pabna, East Bengal and Assam, British India
- Died: 27 June 1979 (aged 73); Rajshahi, Bangladesh
- Occupations: Poet, writer, artist, lyricist
- Awards: full list

Bande Ali Mia (17 January 1906 – 27 June 1979) was a Bangladeshi poet, lyricist, novelist, dramatist, essayist, children's writer, and journalist. He was awarded the Bangla Academy Literary Award in 1962 and the Ekushey Padak in 1988.

== Early life and career ==
Mia was born in Radhanagar, Pabna. He passed the entrance examination in 1923 from the Majumder Academy. He then studied painting at the Indian Art Academy in Calcutta in 1927. He worked as a journalist for the magazine Islam Darshan. He also taught at a Calcutta Corporation School during 1930–1950. His first book, Chor Jamai, was published in 1921 by Calcutta Ashutosh Library. He authored a total of 84 books, most of which feature a rural setting. Another work, Maynamotir Char, was published in 1931 by DM Library in Calcutta. He was the editor of the periodicals Bikash and Bhorer Alo. Later he worked as a scriptwriter at Rajshahi Radio Station until his death in 1979.

== Legacy ==
Mia's poems were included in the curriculum of school level, secondary, and higher secondary Bengali literature in Bangladesh. A school, Kobi Bonde Ali High School, was established in 1988.

== Awards ==
- Bangla Academy Literary Award (1962)
- President's Award (1965)
- Pride of Performance Award (1967) by the Pakistani government
- Uttara Sahitya Majlis Padak (1977)
- Ekushey Padak (1988)

== Works ==
Bande's noteworthy work includes the following.

Poetry

- Mainamatir Char (1930)
- Anurag (1932)
- Padmanadir Char (1953)
- Madhumatir Char (1953)
- Dharitri (1975)
- Yaram (1981)
- Leelasangini

Novels

- Basanta Jagrata Dhare (1931)
- Shes Lagna (1941)
- Aranya Godhuli (1949)
- Nibbhrasta (1958)
- Taser Ghar (1954)
- Nari Rahashyamayee

Play

- Masnad (1931)
- Baner Phul
- Kamal Ataturk
- Joar Bhata

Juvenile literature

- Chor Jamai (1927)
- Mrighapori (1932)
- Bagher Ghare Ghoger Basa (1932)
- Shonar Harin (1939)
- Shiyal Panditer Pathshala (1956)
- Kunchbaran Kanya (1961)
- Sat Rajyer Galpa (1977)
- Kamal Ataturk (1937)
- Sharat Chandra and Chhotoder Nazrul (1958)
- Dayni Bou (1959)
- Rupkotha (1960)
- Hadisher Golpo
- Galper Asar
- Shikarer Galpo
- Bhuter Haate
- Sundarbaner Bibhisika
