= Bedaruddin Ahmad =

Bangladeshi musician

- Born: 15 March 1927; Sherpur Upazila, Bogra District, Bengal Presidency, British India
- Died: 1998 (aged 70–71)

Bedaruddin Ahmad (15 March 1927 – 1998) was a Bangladeshi musician. He was the founder principal of Bulbul Lalitakala Academy.

== Early life and career ==
Ahmad was born in Sherpur Upazila, Bogra District to Muhammad Mohiruddin and Nekjahan Begum. He first learnt to play the harmonium from Gour Chandra Ghosh. He stood first in a children's musical contest in North Bengal in 1940.

Ahmad moved to Calcutta to study classical music from Yusuf Khan Qureshi, Mohammad Hossain Khasru, and Raisuddin. He was a regular artiste of All India Radio in Caluctta.

== Awards ==
- Bangla Academy Literary Award (1974)
- Ekushey Padak (1980)
