= Mohammad Ferdous Khan =

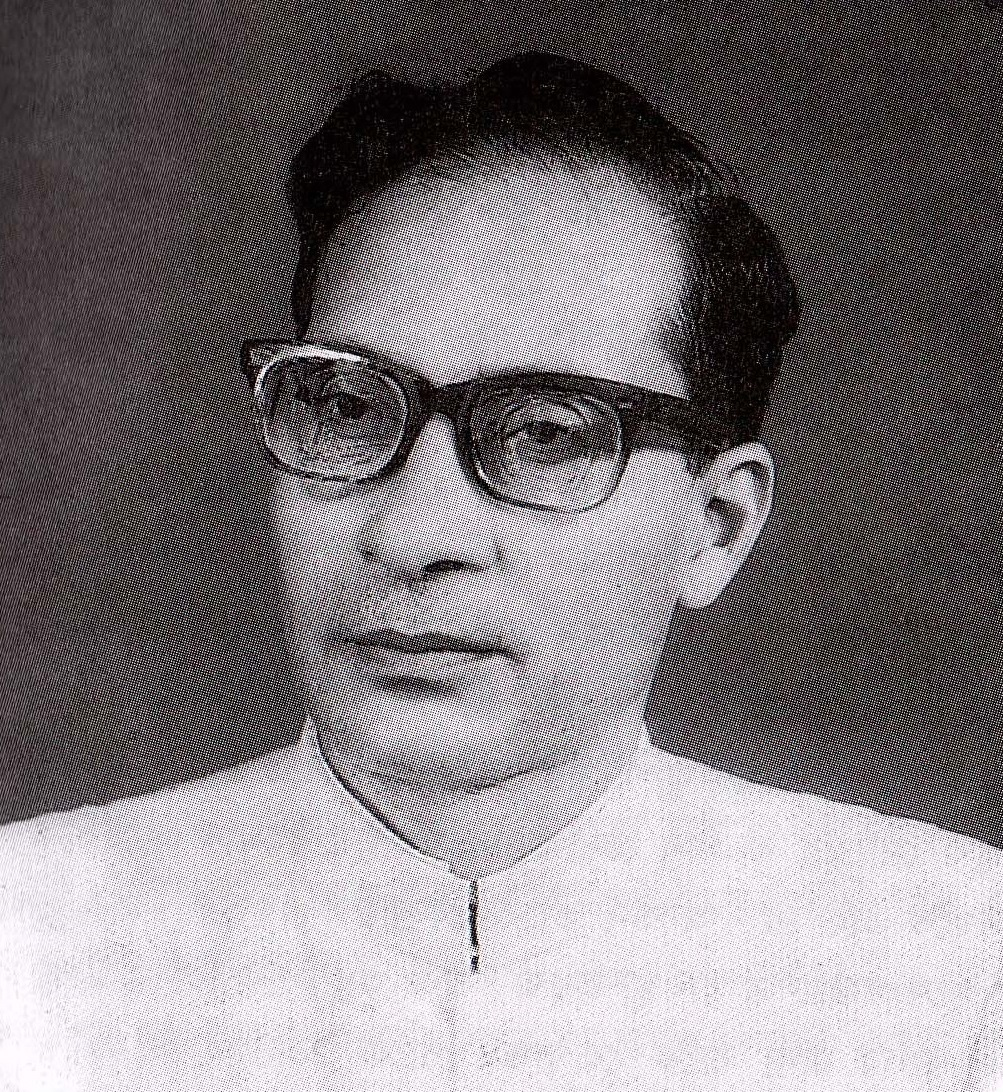
- Mohammad Ferdous Khan
- Died: March 30, 2016 (aged 96); Dhaka, Bangladesh
- Resting place: Pathantuli, Chittagong
- Occupation: academic administrator

Mohammad Ferdous Khan (died March 30, 2016) was a Bangladeshi educationist. He was awarded the Ekushey Padak in 1980 and the Independence Day Award by the Government of Bangladesh. He was the eldest son of Amanat Khan, a former member of Bengal Legislative Assembly.

== Career ==
Khan served as the Director of Public Instruction (DPI) from October 1965 until March 1972.
