= Firdous Azim =

Bangladeshi academic

Firdous Azim is a professor of English at BRAC University, a literary critic, and a women's rights activist. She is the chairperson of the Department of English and Humanities at BRAC University. She is a member of Naripokkho.

== Early life ==
Azim completed her master's degree in English from the University of Dhaka in 1976. She joined the University of Dhaka as a lecturer in 1978. She completed her PhD from the University of Sussex in 1989. She was married to Bashirul Haq, an architect.

== Career ==
Azim worked at the University of Dhaka till becoming a full professor in the English Department. She joined BRAC University in July 2004.

Azim published her book, The Colonial Rise of the Novel, in 1993 through Routledge. The books examines 18th century novels through feminist and post colonial lenses. In June 1994 she published "Lost in India: The Stories of Kim and Gora" in the journal of the Bangla Academy with Professor Kashinath Roy of the University of Dhaka.

In 1996, Azim edited, along with Niaz Zaman, Infinite Variety: Women in Society and Literature through The University Press Limited.

Azim, along with Niaz Zaman, edited Different Perspectives: Women Writing in Bangladesh in 1998.

Azim presented her paper, Feminist Struggles in Bangladesh in Creating Collective/Doing Transnational Politics at the European Social Forum, on 16 November 2004 and this paper was later published in the Feminist Review in July 2005.

Azim wrote Women and religion in Bangladesh: new paths for Open Democracy on 19 December 2007. In March 2008, she moderated a discussion on Stories of Change documentary.

Azim moderated a session of the 2012 Hay Festival. She spoke in the Commonwealth Writers Conversation: The Untold Story session of the 2013 Hay Festival. In March 2013, Azim edited Complex Terrains: Islam, Culture and Women in Asia for Routledge.

Azim hosted a panel at the 2014 Hay Festival in which she spoke with Zia Haider Rahman about his new novel, In the Light of What We Know. In 2015, she taught at the Umea Centre for Gender Studies in Umeå University.

On 11 August 2016, Azim presented the Nari O Sahitya colloquium at the Central Women's University. She was a judge at the 2016 Commonwealth Short Story Prize.

Azim served as a jury DSC Prize for South Asian Literature of 2018. Azim attended the launch of Resonance a literary journal of BRAC University in October 2019. In March 2019, she signed an open letter with a group of other activists accusing the government of Bangladesh of cowardly action for forcefully canceling a talk between Shahidul Alam and Arundhati Roy in Dhaka.

Azim is member of the Board of Trustees of Bangladesh Freedom Foundation. She is an editor of the Feminist Review and member of the Naripokkho and Inter-Asia Cultural Studies Society. She is the leader of Naripokkho's The Forgotten Women of 1971 project. On 26 November 2020, she spoke at the Curriculum Integration (CI) Program of the University of Liberal Arts Bangladesh. Azim signed a petition with 41 other academics calling on the government to form a Supreme Judicial Council to investigate allegations against the Bangladesh Election Commission. She attended a session, Women Representing Women, on the second day of the 'English JUbilee Lit Fest 2021' at Jahangirnagar University in March 2021. In October 2021, she signed a letter with 46 other academics condemning attacks on Hindu religious minorities in Bangladesh.

Azim wrote the introduction of the 2022 book Inherited Memories: Third-Generation Perspective on Partition in the East by Zubaan. She is part of the research team for The Gendered Price of Precarity: Workplace Sexual Harassment and Young Women's Agency which is an ongoing project of The British Academy.
