= Benajir Ahmed =

Bangladeshi poet and writer

- বেনজীর আহমেদ
- Born: c. 1903; Narayanganj District, Bengal Presidency, British India
- Died: 12 February 1983 (aged 79–80)

Benajir Ahmed (c. 1903 – 12 February 1983) was a Bangladeshi poet and writer. He was awarded Bangla Academy Literary Award in 1964 and Ekushey Padak in 1979 by the Government of Bangladesh.

== Early life and career ==
Ahmed was born on 1903 in Dhanuya, Narayanganj, Bengal Presidency, British Raj. He was involved with Khalifat movement and the Non-cooperation movement of British India. In his youth, Ahmed fought against British rule of India. In 1921 he was arrested by the British. He was involved with the All India Muslim League and supported the Pakistan Movement. In 1962 he was elected to the Pakistan National Council from Dhaka-6.

== Works ==
Ahmed wrote for the Daily Azad and Dainik Nabajug. His poetry was inspired by the works of Kazi Nazrul Islam. His literary works are included in the curriculum secondary and higher secondary Bengali Literature in Bangladesh. In 1964 he was awarded the Bangla Academy Award for poetry.
