= Azizur Rahman (poet) =

Bangladeshi poet and lyricist

- Born: 18 January 1917; Kushtia, East Bengal (now Bangladesh)
- Died: 12 September 1978 (aged 61)
- Occupations: poet, lyricist
- Awards: Ekushey Padak (1979)

Azizur Rahman (18 January 1917 – 12 September 1978) was a Bangladeshi poet and lyricist. He was awarded Ekushey Padak posthumously by the People's Republic of Bangladesh in 1979 for his contribution in Bengali literature.

== Early life ==
Rahman was born on 18 January 1917 in the village of Haripur in Kushtia District of the then East Bengal under the British Raj (now Bangladesh) to a Zamindar family. He dropped out of school at a young age and began composing songs for the stage performance of Jatra.

== Career ==
Rahman joined Dhaka Radio Station (now Bangladesh Betar) as a staff artiste in 1954 and composed a large number patriotic and Islamic songs for the radio. He served as an editor of juvenile monthly Alapani and also as the literary editor of daily Paygam from 1964 to 1970.

=== Notable works ===
==== Songs ====
- Bengali: পলাশ ঢাকা কোকিল ডাকা আমারই দেশ ভাই রে প্রভৃতি। (O brother, my palash (a kind of red flower))
- Bengali: কারো মনে তুমি দিও না আঘাত (Don't distress any one)

==== Literary works ====
- Dainosaurer Rajya (1962)
- Jibjantur Katha (1962)
- Chhutir Dine (1963)
- Ei Mati Ei Desh (1970)
