= Bidit Lal Das =

- বিদিত লাল দাস
- Born: 15 June 1936; Sylhet, Assam Province, British India
- Died: 8 October 2012 (aged 76); Dhaka, Bangladesh
- Occupations: Folk musician; composer
- Spouse: Kanak Rani Das (b. 1968)
- Children: 2
- Parent(s): Binod Lal Das (father); Prabha Rani Das (mother)

Bidit Lal Das (15 June 1936 – 8 October 2012), commonly known as Potol Babu, was a Bangladeshi folk singer, composer, and music teacher from Swadhin Bangla Betar Kendra.

== Early life ==
Bidit Lal was born on 15 June 1938 in Sheikhghat, Sylhet, to a noble zamindar parivaar (landlord family) called "lalbrother's house". His grandfather, Bonk Bihari Das, was a local zamindar. He was a Pakwaj Badhak. His family was associated with the Indian National Congress. Bidit's father, Binod Lal Das, was a Member of the Assam Legislative Assembly, and his mother, Prabha Rani Das, is a sitar player. Bidit was the fifth among his siblings.

He started learning music at the age of 7. Later, he studied music under Indian maestro Paresh Chakraborty. Moving to Assam in 1946, he began his education there. He was a science student at the Shillong Saint Advance School and College. He returned to Sylhet after hearing the news of his father's illness in 1959.

People in Sylhet knew him by his nickname, Potol Babu.

== Music career ==
Bidit Lal Das has composed several songs during his career. Among the songs he composed, 16 songs are notable:

- "Sadher Lau Banailo More Bairagi"
- "morilay kandish na amar day"
- "Sylhet pratam azan dhoni babay diyache"
- "kare dekhabo moner dukkho go"
- "Binodini go tor brindaban kare diye jabi"
- "ami kemon kore potro likhi re"
- "Pran kande man kandere"
- "Bhramar kayo giya"
- "premer mora jole dube na"
- "Hasan Raja bole O Allah"
- "ami jaimu allahr songe"
- "sona didi go"
- "moron kotha soron hoilo na tor"
- "tumi rahamat er nadiya"
- "moron kotha soron hoilo na tor"
- "shesht bia'r Sanai"

Bidit Lal Das was the president of Bangladesh Sangeet Sangathan Samannay Parishad's Sylhet chapter. He formed an organisation called Bidit Lal Das O Shohoshilpibrindo.

== Death ==
Bidit Lal Das died on 8 October 2012 at the age of 77 years old. He suffered from bladder and lung disease. He was admitted to the Allied Critical Care Hospital in Sylhet on 7 September 2012. When the condition worsened, he was admitted to Square Hospital in Dhaka on 21 September. He was on life support from 4 October. After paying respects at Sylhet Central Shaheed Minar, his last rites were held at Shashan in Chalibandar.

== Awards ==
- Bangladesh Shilpakala Academy Gunijan Award
- Sylhet Lok Sangeet Parishad Award
- Nazrul Academy Award
- Ragib Rabeya Foundation Ekushey Padak
- National Radharman Dutta Medal (posthumous)
- Hasan Raja Medal (posthumous)
