= Bangladesh Fisheries Research Institute =

Government organization in Mymensingh, Bangladesh

- বাংলাদেশ মৎস্য গবেষণা ইনস্টিটিউট
- Formation: 1984
- Headquarters: Mymensingh, Bangladesh
- Region served: Bangladesh
- Official language: Bengali
- Website: Bangladesh Fisheries Research Institute

Bangladesh Fisheries Research Institute is an autonomous government research institution for fisheries and related research. Its current director general is Yahia Mahmud.

== History ==
The institution was founded in 1984 and started functioning in 1986. Its headquarters are located in Mymensingh. the institution manages a number of specialized research stations. They are Riverine Station located in Chandpur, Freshwater Station located in Mymensingh, Brackishwater Station located in Khulna, and Marine Fisheries and Technological Station in Cox's Bazar. Two smaller stations are for reservoir fisheries in Rangamati and floodplain ecosystem in Santahar. A chief scientific officer is in charge of each station.

== Awards ==
- Ekushey Padak – 2020 for research.
