= Ronen Kushari =

Bangladeshi film actor (1949/50–2021)

- Born: 1949 or 1950
- Died: October 10, 2021 (aged 71)
- Occupation: Actor
- Awards: Ekushey Padak

Ronen Kushari (1949 or 1950–October 10, 2021) was a Bangladeshi film actor.

== Career ==
Notable films in which he acted include Asiya, Raja Elo Sohore, and Akash Ar Mati. He was awarded the Ekushey Padak, the second highest civilian award of Bangladesh, in 1980 for his contributions to the performing arts.

Kushari was associated with Rongom, a theater group founded by Nilima Ibrahim. He also worked for Bangladesh Betar (Radio Bangladesh) for many years as a drama producer.

== Personal life ==
His son, Samir Kushari, was a cinematographer.
