= Sheikh Luthfur Rahman =

Bangladeshi composer and singer

- Born: 1920; Chhoto Bakal village, Satkhira District, Bengal Presidency, British India
- Died: 1994 (aged 73–74)

Sheikh Luthfur Rahman (born 1920) was a Bangladeshi composer and singer. He received the Ekushey Padak from the Government of Bangladesh in 1979. He was notable for the composition of the songs "Orey Bhai, Bangladesher Bangali Ar Nai", “Shunen Hujur Bagher Jaat Eyi Bangalira”, “Manbona Bondhon Manbona” and others.

== Early life ==
Since age nine, Rahman was trained under his father, Sheikh Abdul Huque, in Nazrul Sangeet and Rabindra Sangeet. Umapodo Bhattacharjyo, the principle of the local high school, taught him pure classical music. He also received training in pure classical songs under Onathnath Basu and Biddyut Biswas.

== Career ==
Rahman moved to Kolkata in 1942. He joined the Song Publicity Department and was enlisted at the Kolkata Radio Station. After 1947, he settled in the then East Pakistan and joined the radio station as an enlisted artiste. From 1956 to 1964, he lived in erstwhile West Pakistan where he taught at the Nazrul Academy, in Karachi.

Rahman wrote an autobiography title "Jiboner Gaan Gayee".
