= Shah Alamgir =

Bangladeshi journalist (died 2019)

- Born: 22 February 1957
- Died: 28 February 2019 (aged 62)
- Education: University of Dhaka
- Occupation: Journalism
- Organization: Press Institute of Bangladesh
- Known for: Journalist
- Spouse: Fauzia Begum (Maya Alamgir) (m. 1988)
- Children: Ashiqul Alam Deep (1990—) Archi Ananya (1995—)
- Awards: Rotary International Life Achievement award, 2016 Ekushey Padak, 2023

Shah Alamgir (died 28 February 2019) was a Bangladeshi journalist. He served as the Director General of Press Institute of Bangladesh. He joined the post on 7 July 2013. Before joining PIB, he worked as a journalist.

== Personal life ==
Alamgir was born in Brahmanbaria District. Due to his father's job, he spent a large part of his life in greater Mymensingh.. He was the eldest among six brothers and four sisters. He married Fauzia Begum (Maya Alamgir) in 1988. Their first child Ashiqul Alam Deep was born in 1990 and their second child Archi Ananya was born in 1995.

== Education life ==
He passed HSC from Gauripur College, Mymensingh. Later, he completed his graduation and post-graduation in Bangla literature from University of Dhaka. He also completed his higher degree course of journalism from the Moscow Institute of Journalism, conducted by Thomson Foundation.

== Career ==
Alamgir is well regarded as one of the pioneers of electronic journalism in Bangladesh. Alamgir's journalism career started from his student life. He started his career through joining the first child-teen weekly Kishore Bangla. He worked as the co-editor there from 1980 to 1984. Then he worked at Dainik Janata, Banglar Bani, Daily Azad and Daily Sangbad. He was involved with the Prothom Alo from November 1998 to September 2001, where he served as the joint editor. Then he began working in television, starting with Channel I as Chief News Editor, then Ekushey Television as Head of News, Jamuna Television as Director (News), and Maasranga Television as Head of News. Along with these, Alamgir served as the President and General Secretary of Dhaka Union of Journalists. He was also the President of Children's Welfare Council and Children's National Institutes ChaderHat. He was a member of the board of directors of Bangladesh Shishu Academy. He was President of "Bangladesh Shishu Kallayan Parishad" from January 2006 to December 2018 i.e. for 12 years. Prior to joining PIB, he served as the chief executive officer and Chief Editor of Asian Television.

== Awards ==
- Poet Abu Jafar Obaidullay literature award, 2006
- Chandraboti gold medal, 2005
- Rotary Dhaka South vocational excellence award, 2004
- Cumilla youth samity award, 2004
- Rotary International Life Achievement award, 2016
- Ekushey Padak, 2023 (posthumous)
