= Mohammad Modabber (journalist) =

Bangladeshi journalist (1908–1984)

- মোহাম্মদ মোদাব্বের
- Born: 6 October 1908; Basirhat, Bengal Presidency, British India (now in West Bengal)
- Died: 21 April 1984 (aged 75)
- Other name: Baghban Bhai
- Occupation: Journalist

Mohammad Modabber (6 October 1908 – 21 April 1984) was a Bangladeshi journalist. He was awarded Bangla Academy Literary Award in 1965 and Ekushey Padak in 1979 by the Government of Bangladesh for his contribution to journalism.

== Career ==
Modabber pursued his journalistic career from 1924 to 1945. He served as the news editor of the daily newspaper The Azad in the 1940s. Modabber led the "Mukul Child Movement" with a view to ensuring the rights of children and juveniles. He was an anti-British movement leader and was arrested several times because of his involvement in the movement.
