= Abdul Wahab (journalist) =

Bangladeshi journalist

- Born: 1916
- Died: 1994 (aged 77–78)
- Occupation: Journalist

Abdul Wahab (1916–1994) was a Bangladeshi journalist. He was awarded Ekushey Padak in 1979 by the Government of Bangladesh.

== Career ==
After the Liberation of Bangladesh, Wahab edited The Liberation of Bangladesh, The Dhaka Daily and Morning News. He also served as a faculty in journalism at the University of Dhaka.

== Works ==
- One Man's Agony: A Sketch Book of Yahyan Oppression
