= List of Bangladeshi scientists =

Scientists of Bangladesh

This is a list of scientists who are, or have been, citizens of the nation of Bangladesh.

== A ==
- Abdus Suttar Khan
- S Taher Ahmed, Professor of Geology
- Arun Kumar Basak
- A A Mamun

== F ==
- Fazlur Rahman Khan
- Fazley Bary Malik

== H ==
- Hiranmay Sen Gupta

== J ==
- Jamal Nazrul Islam

== K ==
- Kamrun Nahar

== M ==
- M. A. Wazed Miah
- M. Zahid Hasan
- Maqsudul Alam
- Muhammed Zafar Iqbal

== O ==
- M Osman Ghani

== Q ==
- Muhammad Qudrat-i-Khuda
- Qazi Motahar Hossain

== S ==
- Samir Kumar Saha
- Md. Samir
- Senjuti Saha
- S. M. Ullah
- Syed Safiullah
