= Saidur Rahman =

Saidur Rahman may refer to:

- Saidur Rahman Boyati (born 1931), Bangladeshi singer
- Saidur Rahman Dawn (born 1963), Bangladeshi sprinter
- Saidur Rahman Khan, Bangladeshi politician
- Saidur Rahman Patel, Bangladeshi footballer
- Saidur Rahman (computer scientist) (born 1966)
- Saidur Rahman (mechanical engineer), Bangladeshi professor of engineering
- Mohammad Saidur Rahman (1940–2007), Bangladeshi writer
