= Begum Feroza Bari =

- Born: 23 October 1917; Chuadanga District
- Died: 5 June 1982 (aged 64); Dhaka, Bangladesh
- Citizenship: BAN
- Occupation: Social work
- Known for: Social work, promoting women's and children's rights
- Children: 4, including Fazley Bary Malik
- Awards: Taghma E Pakistan; Independence Day Award (1982)

Begum Feroza Bari (1917–1982) was a renowned Bangladeshi social worker and female leader. For her contributions on social welfare, she was awarded Bangladesh's Independence Day Award in 1982, the highest civilian award given by the government of Bangladesh.

== Birth and family ==
Feroza Bari was born on 23 October 1917 in Chuadanga. Her father was Aftab Hossain Joardar and her mother Fatema Begum. Feroza Bari's husband, Engineer M.A. Bari was the first Bengali chairman of the Chittagong Port Authority. She was a mother of three daughters and a son. Her son, Fazley Bary Malik was an accomplished nuclear physicist of the United States and Bangladesh.

== Education ==
With the support of her husband, Feroza Bari studied in Shantiniketon. She was the first female Bengali Muslim graduate of Shantiniketon.

== Activity ==
Before the Independence of Bangladesh, Feroza Bari was the president of the East Pakistan Child Welfare Council and its affiliated Disabled Children's Care Centre. She was also president of the Shilpayan Industrial Home. She went on to become a celebrated female social worker and leader in Bangladesh, particularly in the field of women's and children's rights. In 1976, she joined as the President's Women's Affairs assistant during the government of President Abu Sadat Mohammad Sayem and subsequently became Advisor to the President on Women's Affairs during the government of President Ziaur Rahman between 1977 and 1978, before the formation of the Bangladesh Nationalist Party (BNP). She died from natural causes on 5 June 1982.

== Award and achievements ==
She received the Tamgha-e-Pakistan (Medal of Pakistan) decoration, the fourth highest civilian award of Pakistan, awarded for distinguished services to the State. In 1982, for her contribution to society and people of Bangladesh, the government of Bangladesh awarded her with the Independence Day Award also known as "highest civilian award" of the country.

== See also ==
- List of Independence Day Award recipients (1980–89)
- Tahera Kabir
