= Hiranmay Sen Gupta =

Bangladeshi physicist (1934–2022)

- হিরন্ময় সেন গুপ্ত
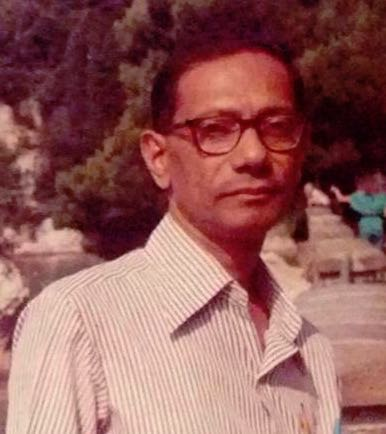
- Born: 1 August 1934; Barisal, Bengal Presidency, British India
- Died: 8 January 2022 (aged 87); Dhaka, Bangladesh
- Education: University of Dhaka; University of London; University of Oxford
- Spouse: Sucharita Sen Gupta
- Children: Himadri Sen Gupta; Ashish Sen Gupta
- Scientific career
- Fields: Nuclear Physics
- Workplaces: University of Dhaka
- Thesis: The scattering of 3He particles of various energies by C, N, O, A and I. (1963)
- Doctoral advisor: Joseph Rotblat

Hiranmay Sen Gupta, Bengali: হিরন্ময় সেন গুপ্ত, (1 August 1934 – 8 January 2022) was a Bangladeshi physicist who specialised in nuclear physics. In a career spanning five decades he published over 200 research papers and was made a fellow of Bangladesh Academy of Sciences in 1977.

== Biography ==
Sen Gupta was born on 1 August 1934 in Barisal in the then Bengal Presidency of British India to Suruchi Bala and Jitendra Nath Sen Gupta. He obtained his Ph.D. in nuclear physics from the University of London in 1963, under the supervision of Joseph Rotblat. His doctoral thesis studied the scattering of Helium-3 particles. He stayed back in the United Kingdom conducting his postdoctoral research at the Nuclear Physics Laboratory at the University of Oxford between 1973 and 1976, and at the Department of Physics, University of Birmingham between 1981 and 1982.

He served as the professor of physics at the University of Dhaka between 1955 and 2000, where he had also served as the chairman of the department. He was also a senior associate at Abdus Salam International Centre for Theoretical Physics (ICTP) in Trieste during 1982 and 1992. He was also a visiting professor at the Kyushu University in Fukuoka, Japan in 1994. He retired in 2000. In a career spanning five decades he published over 200 research papers and was a fellow of Bangladesh Academy of Sciences since 1977. His research interests included condensed matter theory specializing in the study of elastic and inelastic scattering. His book in Bangla on nuclear physics, published by University of Dhaka, was part of the curriculum for MSc and MPhil students at the university.

Sen Gupta died in Dhaka at the BIRDEM General Hospital on 8 January 2022, at the age of 87. He was married and had two sons.

== Awards ==
- H.P. Roy Gold Medal (1967)
- A. Rob Chowdhury Gold Medal (1975)
- Sonali Bank Gold Medal (1984)
- Ibrahim Gold Medal (1992)

== Select works ==
- Ahmed, Syed; Akther, Parvin; Ferdous, Nasima; Begum, Amena; Sen Gupta, Hiranmay (1997). "Elastic Scattering of 65 MeV Protons from Several Nuclei between 16O and 209Bi". Journal of the Physical Society of Japan. 66 (10): 3063–3069. Bibcode:1997JPSJ...66.3063A. doi:10.1143/JPSJ.66.3063. ISSN 0031-9015.
- Abdullah, M.N.A.; Sabra, M.S.; Rashid, M.M.; Shehadeh, Z.; Billah, M.M.; Das, S.K.; Uddin, M.A.; Basak, A.K.; Reichstein, I.; Sen Gupta, H.M.; Malik, F.B. (2006). "Alpha–alpha potential up to 47.3 MeV bombarding energy". Nuclear Physics A. 775 (1–2): 1–22. Bibcode:2006NuPhA.775....1A. doi:10.1016/j.nuclphysa.2006.06.007.
- Abdullah, M.N.A.; Idris, A.B.; Tariq, A.S.B.; Islam, M.S.; Das, S.K.; Uddin, M.A.; Mondal, A.S.; Basak, A.K.; Reichstein, I.; Sen Gupta, H.M.; Malik, F.B. (2005). "Potentials for the α–40,44,48Ca elastic scattering". Nuclear Physics A. 760 (1–2): 40–58. Bibcode:2005NuPhA.760...40A. doi:10.1016/j.nuclphysa.2005.05.149.
- Hai, E.; Soheli, S.; Rahman, Md A.; Sen Gupta, H. M. (1999). "Inelastic scattering of pions leading to the lowest octupole states in nuclei". Il Nuovo Cimento A. 112 (9): 1049–1057. Bibcode:1999NCimA.112.1049H. doi:10.1007/BF03035911. ISSN 0369-3546. S2CID 120583041.

== See also ==
- Condensed matter physics
- University of Dhaka
