= Baker Hostel =

Government hostel in Kolkata

Baker Government Hostel
- বেকার সরকারি হোস্টেল

General information
- Status: Active
- Location: 8 Smith Lane, Taltala, Kolkata, West Bengal, India
- Coordinates: 22.5588543°N 88.3589861°E
- Opened: 1910
- Owner: Government of West Bengal

Baker Hostel is a government boys' hostel located in Kolkata, West Bengal, India. The hostel was founded in 1910 during the rule of the British Raj by Edward Norman Baker, the then Lieutenant Governor of Bengal. The hostel is located at 8 Smith Lane in Taltala. It is primarily for the male Muslim students of Maulana Azad College – they will occupy 90% of the seats. The rest will be for the students of other colleges which are affiliated to the University of Calcutta.

== History ==
Due to the unhygienic environment and inadequate housing system around the Taylor hostel built in 1896 for students in Kolkata, they started a movement for the construction of a new hostel. Nawab Abdul Jabbar initiated the movement in 1908. Khan Bahadur Ahsanullah, A. K. Fazlul Huq played a major role in establishing the hostel. As a result, government built this hostel.

== Museum ==
Two rooms of this hostel (no. 23 and 24) were converted into a museum in honor of Sheikh Mujibur Rahman, the founding father and the first president of Bangladesh. The museum was inaugurated on 31 July 1998. On 23 February 2011, a bust of Mujib was installed in the hostel.

In 2017, the All Bengal Minority Youth Federation criticized the decision and demanded that the bust of Bangabandhu be removed from the hostel as Islam does not allow the installation of idols in the building. The organization's general secretary Kamruzzaman found this act objectionable because a mosque is located inside the hostel. The organization sent letters to Mamata Banerjee, the chief minister of West Bengal and Sheikh Hasina, the prime minister of Bangladesh, regarding the matter. In March, the month before Sheikh Hasina's visit to India, the central government of India had directed the West Bengal government to take action against the organization and its supporters, who it termed as anti-Hasina extremist groups.

However, Local Government, Rural Development and Cooperatives Minister of Bangladesh, Md. Tajul Islam, visited the museum in March 2019 and found defects in the bust, which was replaced by a new bust on August 3.

Room No. 24 of the museum is known as Bangabandhu Memorial Room. Bangabandhu's bust is located in front of the door of the room. Inside the room are his used bed, table and chair. There is a small library where the books written by Sheikh Mujibur Rahman are arranged. On the table is a photograph of him giving his 7 March Speech. Entry to the museum is limited and it is managed by the hostel authority.

== Notable alumni ==
- Azizul Haque
- Hamidul Huq Choudhury
- Khaleque Nawaz Khan
- Khalilur Rahman
- Sheikh Mujibur Rahman
- Syed Hedayetullah
- Syed Murtaza Ali
