= Power Grid Bangladesh =

Power system operator in Bangladesh

Power Grid Bangladesh PLC
- Abbreviation: Power Grid
- Formation: 1996
- Type: Government owned Public Limited organisation .
- Headquarters: Dhaka, Bangladesh
- Region served: Bangladesh
- Official language: Bengali, English
- Chairman: M. Rezwan Khan
- Staff: 3387
- Website: Power Grid Bangladesh
- Formerly called: Power Grid Company of Bangladesh Ltd.

Power Grid Bangladesh PLC (previously known as Power Grid Company of Bangladesh Ltd - PGCB) is the sole distributor of electric power in Bangladesh. It is listed at the Dhaka and Chittagong Stock Exchange.

== History ==
Power Grid was established in 1996.

== Activities ==
Power Grid Bangladesh manages the national power grid of Bangladesh, devising required plan, conducting primary feasibility study, doing research, preparation of substation & transmission Line design, and constructing transmission lines and Grid substation. Power Grid also provides maintenance of transmission line, grid sub-station & national load dispatch center (NLDC).

Power grid Bangladesh owns its own internal, optical-fiber communication network facilities.

Presently, Power Grid has 400 kV, 230 kV and 132 kV transmission lines across the country, 400/230 kV grid substations, 400/132 kV grid substations, 230/132 kV grid substations, 230/33 kV grid substations and 132/33 kV grid substation.

Power Grid has been connected with India through a 1000 MW 400 kV HVDC Back to Back station (equipped with two blocks).

== Transmission Infrastructure Information ==
=== Transmission Line owned By Power Grid ===
Voltage Level	Circuit Length
400kV	3,087 km
230 KV	4,724 km
132 KV	9066 km

Total Transmission line owned by Power Grid is 16877 Circuit KM.

=== Substation Owned by Power Grid ===
Substation Category	Quantity in Nos
400 KV HVDC Station	01
400/230 KV Substation	09
400/132 KV Substation	04
230/132 KV Substation	32
230/33 KV Substation	02
132/33 KV Substation	142

Dispatch Capacity at 33kV level: 35,138 MW (Including all organizations)

== Function of Power Grid ==
The main operating function of Power Grid Bangladesh is wheeling of energy from power stations owned by BPDB, Government Generation Companies, IPP & Adani-Power-India etc. to Distribution entities utilizing transmission network. Power Grid gets its energy wheeling charge from its clients(distribution entities) at the rate fixed by Bangladesh Electricity Regulatory Commission (BERC). Power Grid also gets a huge revenue by giving rent its reliable optical fiber to ISP.

== Customers of Power Grid ==
All the distribution Company of Bangladesh are the customer of Power Grid. They take power mostly at 33 KV Voltage level. Some of them take power at 132 KV Voltage level. These companies are BPDB, BREB, all PBS, NESCO, WZPDCL, DESCO & DPDC. In addition, Some industries like BSRM, KSRM etc. take power from Power Grid directly at 132KV & 230 KV Voltage level.

== Certification ==
Power Grid Bangladesh is an Organization holding certificate of latest version ISO 9001:2015 of International Standard of Quality Management. Moreover, It has achieved internationally recognized standard BS ISO 45001:2018 related to professional security management in workplace.

== See also ==
- Electricity sector in Bangladesh
