= Firdausi Qadri =

Bangladeshi scientist

- ফিরদৌসী কাদরী
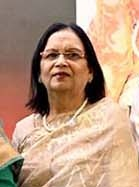
- Firdausi Qadri in 2023
- Born: 31 March 1951 (age 75)
- Education: University of Dhaka; Liverpool University
- Awards: full list
- Scientific career
- Fields: Immunology, vaccine, microbiology
- Workplaces: ICDDR,B

Firdausi Qadri (born 31 March 1951) is a Bangladeshi scientist with specialization in immunology and infectious disease research. She has worked over 25 years on the development of vaccines for cholera and has expertise on other infectious diseases like ETEC, Typhoid, Helicobacter pylori, rotavirus, etc. Currently, she is working as a director for Centre for Vaccine Sciences of International Centre for Diarrhoeal Disease and Research, Bangladesh (ICDDR,B). She also serves as chairperson of the Institute for developing Science and Health initiatives. Her scientific achievements lie in enteric infections and vaccines including Vibrio cholerae and enterotoxigenic Escherichia coli—major causes of severe diarrhea. She has also focused on studying the immune response in Helicobacter pylori infected people in Bangladesh and the responses in patients with typhoid fever as well as vaccinees. The Government of Bangladesh awarded her the Independence Award in 2023.

== Education and professional qualification ==
Qadri got her BSc and MSc degree in biochemistry and molecular biology from the University of Dhaka in 1975 and 1977 respectively. In 1980, she got her PhD degree in biochemistry/immunology from University of Liverpool. After completing her postdoc in immunology from ICDDR,B she joined as an associate scientist in 1988 in the same institution. Currently, she is the senior scientist and director of Centre for Vaccine Science at ICDDR,B.

== Research contributions ==
Qadri has focused her research on enteric diseases, specifically in the areas of immunology, genomics, proteomic technology and diagnostics, and vaccine development. She endeavored to introduce a new cheap oral cholera vaccine in Bangladesh in replacement of Dukoral, which is costly for poor people and cost-ineffective as a public health tool. She demonstrated the efficacy of Shanchol vaccine in mass population in slam areas in Dhaka, then worked to have it adopted as a public health intervention in Bangladesh, including Rohingya refugees.

== Honours and awards ==
In 2012, Qadri was awarded the Fondation Christophe et Rodolphe Mérieux's annual scientific 'Grand Prize', called the "Christophe Mérieux Prize", for her research on infectious enteric diseases. This award made possible the creation of the Institute for Developing Science and Health Initiatives (ideSHi) in 2014. In 2014, she has been named as a member of a high-level panel which will advise the UN chief on the organizational and operational aspects of a proposed Technology Bank and Science, Technology and Innovation Supporting Mechanism dedicated to the least developed countries. She is also listed in the Asian Scientist 100 list published by magazine Asian Scientist.

In August 2021, the Ramon Magsaysay Award was presented to Firdausi Qadri.

== Memberships ==
Qadri is a founder and a member of Board of Advisory of the Bangladesh Society of Microbiologists. She is the International Ambassador for the American Society for Microbiology Bangladesh and a fellow of the Bangladesh Academy of Sciences since 2008.

== Awards ==
- Gold Medal Award from the Bangladesh Academy of Sciences in 2005
- Christophe Mérieux Prize in 2012
- Anannya Top Ten Awards in 2013
- C. N. R. Rao Prize in 2013, one of the awards conferred annually by TWAS, the world academy of sciences for the advancement of science in developing countries.
- L'Oréal-UNESCO For Women in Science Awards in 2020
- Ramon Magsaysay Award in 2021
- Independence Day Award in 2023
- VinFuture Prize's Developing Country Innovator in 2024
