= Abul Fazal Atwar Husain =

Bangladeshi economist

Abul Fazal Atwar Husain (1918–1987) was a Bangladeshi economist.

== Early life ==
Husain was born on 21 August 1918 in Noakhali, Noakhali District, East Bengal, British India. His father was from Bogra and was in Noakhali working as the deputy magistrate. He graduated from Noakhali Zilla School and then Dhaka College. He graduated from Dhaka University with a double major in economics and political science. He moved to London in 1938. He studied at the London School of Economics, finished another undergrad degree and a master's degree, and graduated in 1943. He worked as an extended lecturer at the India House of University of London from 1943 to 1948.

== Career ==
Husain moved Dhaka after the Partition of India. He joined Economics Department of Dhaka University as a reader. In 1953, he was appointed the head of the commerce department of Dhaka University. He did a research project on the impact of technology on Pakistan which was financed by UNICEF. The research was published by Oxford University Press. He published a number of notable research papers through the Bureau of Economic Research of Dhaka University. From 1956 to 1958, he worked at Southeast Asia Treaty Organization as an economic officer. He was the President of Pakistan Economics Association. He headed the economic office of Southeast Asia Treaty Organization.

In 1958, Husain joined the Planning board of East Pakistan. He shifted to the Planning Commission of Pakistan and worked there till 1972. After the Independence of Bangladesh, he joined the Bangladesh Planning Commission. He visited the Chr. Michelsen Institute in Norway in 1973. He worked in London at the Commonwealth Secretariat in 1976. From 1976 to 1977, he taught at the Bangladesh Institute of Development Studies. He worked in Sarawak, Malaysia at a research project by Food and Agriculture Organization and United Nations Development Programme. In 1986, he was the chairman of National Commission on Money, Banking and Credit. In 1987, he was appointed a National Professor by the Government of Bangladesh.

== Personal life ==
Husain married Rahmat Ara in 1951. She was the provost of Ruqayyah Hall of Dhaka University. She also worked as the principal of Eden Mohila College.

== Death ==
Husain died on in 1987.
