= Syed Hedayetullah =

Bangladeshi academic (1904–1973)

Syed Hedayetullah Father's name= Syed Sajedullah Chowdhury Mother's name= Talebunnesa Bibi
- Hedayet
- Born: 1904; Bogra District, Bengal Presidency, British India (now Bangladesh)
- Died: 29 August 1973 (aged 68–69); Dhaka, Bangladesh
- Citizenship: Bangladesh
- Education: University of London; University of Calcutta; Presidency College
- Known for: Agriculture
- Scientific career
- Fields: Cytogenetics
- Workplaces: Government of Bangladesh; University of Dhaka
- Notable students: Kazi Badruddoza

Syed Hedayetullah (1904 – 29 August 1973) is considered a main architect of agriculture in Bangladesh. He was a founding fellow of the Bangladesh Academy of Sciences, founder principal of Agriculture College, Dhaka (1944–49), Director of Agriculture, Government of East Pakistan (1949–56) and member of the founding committee of the Botanical Society of Bengal (1935). He is credited with establishing modern Bangladeshi agriculture and food self-sufficiency, having developed 60 superior strains of rice.

Hedayetullah took great interest in religious and social work as well. He was instrumental in the reconstruction of the Amber Shah Mosque at Karwanbazar, Dhaka, development of which has subsequently been taken up by the Bangladesh Government.

== Biography ==
Hedayetullah was born in the Bogra District, Bengal Presidency, British India (now Bangladesh) in 1904. He passed the entrance examination from Maldah Zilla School (now in West Bengal, India) in 1920. He studied at the Presidency College, Calcutta, as a resident of Baker Hostel and secured BSc (Honors) degree in 1926 and MSc degree in 1928 from the Calcutta University in botany. He was offered a state scholarship from the Government of India to study at King's College London from 1929 to 1932. He conducted studies on the cytology and cytogenetics of the Narcissus species and received his PhD degree from University of London in 1932.

Hedayetullah joined Science College, Calcutta, as a senior lecturer in botany in 1933, but left to join the position of Economic Botanist, Government of Bengal in 1935. In 1945 he succeeded G. W. Podwick as the principal of Dhaka Agricultural College (now Sher-e-Bangla Agricultural University). In 1949, he was appointed Director of Agriculture, Government of East Pakistan (Bangladesh). He was a liaison officer, Ministry of Agriculture, Government of Pakistan from 1956 to 1958. After he retired from government service in 1958 he was appointed head of research division at the Pakistan Council of Scientific and Industrial Research Laboratories (now called science laboratory) Dhaka and continued in that position until 1964. From 1964 to 1968, he was a scientific advisor to the Pakistan Jute Mills Association.

Hedayetullah was also the dean, Faculty of Agriculture of Dhaka University. He was a master's degree supervisor of Kazi Badruddoza, a pioneer of the agricultural research system in Bangladesh, at Dhaka University.

== Research ==
During his tenure as Economic Botanist to the Government of Bengal, Hedayetullah was charged with the responsibility of conducting entomological, horticultural, pathological and statistical studies of crops at the Central Agricultural Research Station, Monipur, Dhaka. During this time he consolidated rice research in the Presidency of Bengal into an integrated program. Outstanding local and aus rice varieties that were developed are: dharial, galsura, baish-beesh, dular, pasur, doudir, maliabhanger, Naigershail, and other gene source material brought from Nigeria etc. Dahrial is still one of the leading rice varieties of Bangladesh with a short production cycle of 110 days. Gabura and baish-beesh became the outstanding deep water varieties of the Meghna and Dhaleswari flood plains. They are low input varieties, and under his leadership, matching production technology was also developed for the optimisation of production.

While Hedayetullah was in charge of the science laboratory in Dhaka, he realised that the British Government had almost exhausted and taken away all germplasms of some medicinal plants, particularly Rauvolfia species which is used for the remission of hypertension. He pioneered the collection of available species of the genus Rauvolfia globally, a majority of them from Africa, namely R. afra and R. mombasiana (Rauvolfia serpentina) is locally known as "Sorpogandha"). The majority of his germplasm of Rauvolfia had been transferred to the Botanical Garden of Bangladesh Agricultural University Mymensingh by M. Azhar Hossain who did his master's degree thesis on these species under the late Professor Asraful Haque. Hedayetullah and C.D. Darlington of Great Britain were both students of Ruggle Gates.

Hedayetullah was also involved in the development of transplanted aman varieties of rice. Among them developed, Dudhal is popular in Rajshahi Division for its characteristic drought tolerance and Nigarshail, a fine grain variety, has remained the outstanding local variety of transplanted aman of Dhaka and Chittagong Divisions. Due to its photosensitivity, nigarshail planted in September can provide a good yield. It is thus suitable for flood-affected areas of Bangladesh. In recognition of his research and contribution in improving rice crops, the British Government bestowed upon Hedayetullah the title of "Khan Bahadur".

Hedayetullah also made contributions to horticulture plants. Hedayetullah was also very active in many government bodies, scientific societies and associations. He was a Fellow of the Pakistan Academy of Sciences and the Bangladesh Academy of Sciences. For his contribution to agriculture, Hedayetullah was awarded "Sitara-e-Imtiaz" by President Ayub Khan of the Islamic Republic of Pakistan.

Hedayetullah became a fellow of the FLS and FRMS societies of England. Many of his cytological preparations were included in several textbooks written by the then cytologists around the world. His masterpiece of cytological and cytogenetic works on Narcissus species was published in the journal of the Royal Microscopical Society of Great Britain in the early 1930's.

== Death ==
Hedayetullah died in Dhaka on 29 August 1973, aged 68 or 69. His daughter, Salima Zahiruddin, married architect Shah Alam Zahiruddin.

== Notable publications ==
- Hedayetullah, S. (December 1931). "On the Structure and Division of the Somatic Chromosomes in Narcissus". Journal of the Royal Microscopical Society. 51 (4): 347–386. doi:10.1111/j.1365-2818.1931.tb01845.x. ISSN 1365-2818.
- —— (May 1933). "Meiosis in Oenothera missouriensis". Proceedings of the Royal Society of London B: Biological Sciences. 113 (780): 57–72. doi:10.1098/rspb.1933.0030. ISSN 0962-8452.
- —— (October 1932). "The genetics and cytology of Oenothera rubricalyx ×O. eriensis". Journal of Genetics. 26 (2): 179–197. doi:10.1007/BF02984688. ISSN 0022-1333.
- ——; Chakravorty, A. K. (September 1948). "Anatomical Variation in Rice Oryza Sativa Linn". Journal of the Royal Microscopical Society. 67 (1–4): 1–8. doi:10.1111/j.1365-2818.1947.tb00944.x. ISSN 1365-2818.
