= Mesbahuddin Ahmad =

Bangladeshi academic

- Education: University of Dhaka (M.S.); Ottawa University (Ph.D.)

Mesbahuddin Ahmad is a Bangladeshi academic. He has been a fellow of Bangladesh Academy of Sciences since 1997 and was the president of the academy during 2012–2015. He was the vice-chancellor of Gono University from 2008 to 2016.

== Education and career ==
Ahmad completed his master's in chemistry from the University of Dhaka in 1958. He obtained his Ph.D. from University of Ottawa in organic chemistry in 1963.

He joined the University of Dhaka as a lecturer in 1959. He was an associate professor of the University of Chittagong from 1969 to 1972, when he became a faculty member of Jahangirnagar University.
