= Aminul Islam (academic) =

Bangladeshi academic

- আমিনুল ইসলাম
- Born: 1 January 1935; Nagerchar, Homna, Comilla, Bengal Presidency, British India
- Died: 29 November 2017 (aged 82); Dhaka, Bangladesh
- Occupation: University academic
- Years active: 1996–2000 (Bangladesh National University) and 2001–2011 (Daffodil International University)
- Known for: Academic and scientist
- Title: President
- Board member of: Bangladesh Academy of Sciences
- Awards: Independence Day Award (1990)

Academic background
- Education: Ph.D.
- Alma mater: University of Dhaka; Michigan State University

Academic work
- Discipline: Soil Science

Aminul Islam (1 January 1935 – 29 November 2017) was a Bangladeshi academic. He was the President of Bangladesh Academy of Sciences. He was a fellow of the academy since 1978.

== Early life and education ==
Aminul Islam was born on 1 January 1935 in Nagerchar village of Homna Upazila of Comilla District. He completed his B.Sc. (Hons.) in chemistry in 1954 and M.Sc. in Soil Science in 1955 from the University of Dhaka and Ph.D. in Soil Science from Michigan State University in 1962.

== Career ==
Aminul Islam started his teaching career at the University of Dhaka in 1956 and worked at the Department of Soil Science until 1996. He then served as the Vice-Chancellor of Bangladesh National University (1996–2000) and Daffodil International University during 2002–2011. In May 2016, he started serving as a President of Bangladesh Academy of Sciences and Science Council of Asia.

== Awards ==
- President's Gold Medal (1981)
- Bangladesh Academy of Sciences Gold Medal Award (1986)
- Independence Day Award (1990)
