= International Symposium on Algorithms and Computation =

Academic conference in the field of theoretical computer science

The International Symposium on Algorithms and Computation (ISAAC) is an academic conference in the field of algorithms and theoretical computer science.

ISAAC was founded in 1990 by Takao Nishizeki, under the sponsorship of the Information Processing Society of Japan Special Interest Group for Algorithms (SIGAL). It has been organized annually since 1990; the conference is usually held in Asia, in December each year, but with a global set of participants also including researchers from Europe and North America. The proceedings were published by Springer-Verlag in the LNCS series from 1990 until 2015; since 2016 they have been published in the Leibniz International Proceedings in Informatics open access series by the Leibniz-Zentrum für Informatik at Schloss Dagstuhl in Germany.

ISAAC held an A ranking in the 2023 ICORE ranking of computer science conferences, placing it in the top quartile of ranked conferences.
