= Mokarram Hussain Khundker =

Bangladeshi chemist

Mukarram Hussain Khundkar
- মোকাররম হোসেন খোন্দকার
- Born: c. 1922; Faridpur District, Bengal Presidency, British India
- Died: 30 November 1972 (aged 49–50)
- Education: PhD (Chemistry)
- Alma mater: University of Dhaka; University of Durham
- Employer: University of Dhaka

Mukarram Hussain Khundkar (c. 1922 – 30 November 1972) was a Bangladeshi scientist and educationist. He served as a professor at the Department of Chemistry of the University of Dhaka. He was one of the founding fellows of the Bangladesh Academy of Sciences.

== Biography ==
Khundkar passed the matriculation examination from Barisal Zilla School and intermediate from Jagannath College. He completed his bachelor's and master's degrees in chemistry at the University of Dhaka and became a lecturer there in 1944. In 1945, he went to England on a government scholarship. He earned his Ph.D. in chemistry from the University of Durham.

Khundkar became a reader in the chemistry department of the University of Dhaka in 1949. He became the head of the department in 1954. The same year, he was elected a Fellow of the Royal Institute of Chemistry (FRIC) of Great Britain and a Fellow of the Royal Society of Arts (FRSA), London. He was elected a Fellow of the Pakistan Academy of Sciences in 1959. He was promoted to professor in 1960. His contributions to various fields of chemistry included modification of cellulose and jute, electrochemistry, metal sulphides, non-metallic sulphur compounds, inorganic borates, organo-boron compounds, mineral processing, and analytical chemistry.

Khundkar was a member of the sub-committee for Science and Technology of the Bangla Academy and chairman of the Paribhasa Committee for Chemistry of the Central Board for the development of Bengali.

== Awards ==
- Pakistan Academy of Sciences Gold Medal for research in the physical sciences
- University Gold Medal of Dhaka University
- Independence Day Award (1977)

== Legacy ==
University of Dhaka holds a memorial lecture every year named Khundkar Memorial Lecture in his memory. A science building of the university is named as Mukarram Hussain Biggyan Bhaban. One of the main buildings of the Bangladesh Council of Scientific and Industrial Research (BCSIR) is named as Khundkar Smriti Bhaban. The university also hosts a research chair in memory of him.
