= Ismail Serageldin =

Egyptian academic (born 1944)

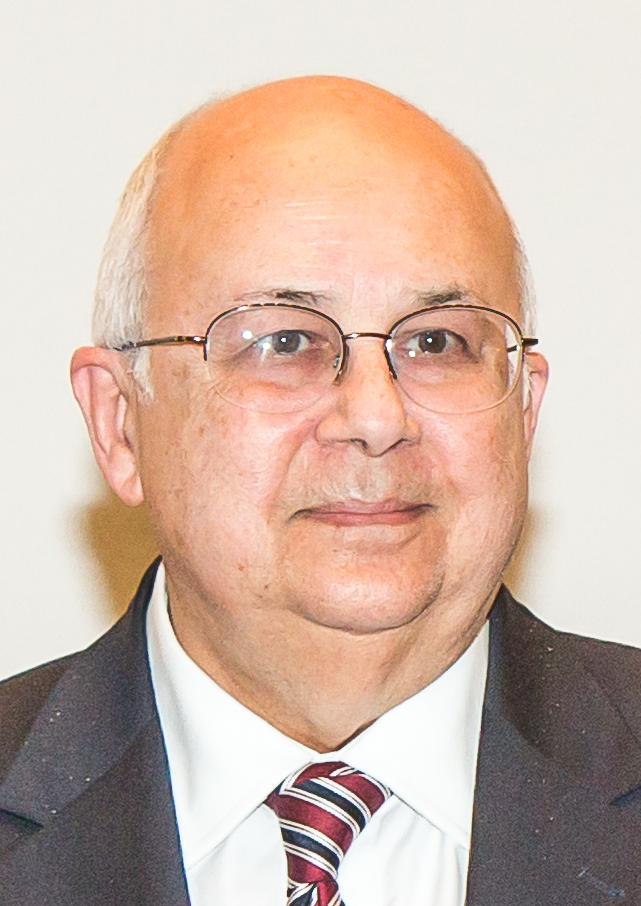
- Serageldin in 2016
- Born: 1944 (age 81–82); Giza, Egypt
- Education: Cairo University
- Alma mater: Harvard University
- Website: www.serageldin.com

Ismail Serageldin (/ˈsɛrəɡɛldɪn/; born 1944 in Giza, Egypt), Founding Director of the Bibliotheca Alexandrina (BA), the new Library of Alexandria, inaugurated in 2002, is currently, Emeritus Librarian, and member of the Board of Trustees of the Library of Alexandria. He serves as Chair or Member of a number of advisory committees for academic, research, scientific and international institutions and civil society efforts, and serves on the Advisory Committee of the World Social Science Report for 2013 and 2016, as well as the UNESCO-supported World Water Scenarios (2013) and the executive council of the Encyclopedia of Life (2010) and Chairs the Executive Council of the World Digital Library (2010). He also co-chaired the African Union's high level panel for Biotechnology (2006) and again for Science, Technology and Innovation (STI) in 2012–2013, and was a member of the ICANN Panel for the review of the internet future (2013).

Before that he notably co-chaired the Inter-Academy Panel on Capacity Building for Science in (2003-2004) and was a member of the High Level group for the Alliance of Civilizations convened by the Secretary General of the United Nations (2006-2007). He has held many important international positions, including Vice President of the World Bank (1992-2000), and Chairman Consultative Group on International Agricultural Research (CGIAR, 1994–2000), founder and former chairman of the Global Water Partnership (GWP, 1996–2000) and the Consultative Group to Assist the Poorest (CGAP), a micro finance program (1995-2000) and was professor of the International Savoirs Contre Pauvreté (Knowledge Against Poverty), at Collège de France, Paris, and distinguished professor at Wageningen University in the Netherlands. Serageldin is sometimes referred to as the "most intelligent man in Egypt".

Serageldin has published over 100 books and monographs and over 500 papers on a variety of topics, including biotechnology, rural development, sustainability, and the value of science to society. He has hosted a cultural program on television in Egypt (over 130 episodes) and developed a TV Science Series in Arabic and English. He holds a Bachelor of Science Degree in Engineering from Cairo University and a master's degree and a Ph.D. from Harvard University and has received 38 honorary doctorates.

In August 2017, an Egyptian judge sentenced Serageldin to three and a half years in prison, for alleged management decisions he made prior to 2011. Over 300 eminent persons, including 90 Nobel Prize winners and 20 current and former heads of state, signed a letter supporting Serageldin and objecting to the verdict, and the case was appealed.

On 26 December 2017, the Appeals Court delivered its verdict and dismissed all the charges against Ismail Serageldin. The Court found that all the accusations were baseless. Ismail Serageldin is now declared innocent of all the allegations made against him during the previous seven years.

== Biography ==
Ismail Serageldin, Founding Director of the Bibliotheca Alexandrina (BA), the new Library of Alexandria, inaugurated in 2002, is currently, Emeritus Librarian, and member of the Board of Trustees of the Library of Alexandria. He is advisor to the Egyptian prime minister in matters concerning culture, science and museums. He serves as Chair or Member of a number of advisory committees for academic, research, scientific and international institutions and civil society efforts, including as co-chair of the Nizami Ganjavi International Center (NGIC), and serves on the Advisory Committee of the World Social Science Report for 2013 and 2016, as well as the UNESCO-supported World Water Scenarios (2013) and the executive council of the Encyclopedia of Life (2010) and Chairs the Executive Council of the World Digital Library (2010). He also co-chaired the African Union's high level panel for Biotechnology (2006) and again for Science, Technology and Innovation (STI) in 2012–2013, and was a member of the ICANN Panel for the review of the internet future (2013).

Before that he notably co-chaired the Inter-Academy Panel on Capacity Building for Science in (2003-2004) and was a member of the High Level group for the Alliance of Civilizations convened by the Secretary General of the United Nations (2006-2007). He is a member of many academies, including the US National Academy of Sciences (Public Welfare Medalist), the American Philosophical Society, the American Academy of Arts and Sciences, the World Academy of Sciences (TWAS), the World Academy of Arts and Sciences (WAAS), the European Academy of Sciences and Arts, the African Academy of Sciences, Institut d'Egypte (Egyptian Academy of Science), the Royal Belgian Academy, the Bangladesh Academy of Sciences, the Indian National Academy of Agricultural Sciences. He lectures widely, and has delivered the Mandela Lecture in Johannesburg (2011) and the Nexus Lecture in Tilburg, the Netherlands (2011) as well as the opening keynote address to the first International Summit of the Book at the Library of Congress in Washington DC (2012). He has received the Order of the Rising Sun from Japan and the Légion d'honneur from France and is a Commandeur of Arts and Letters of the French Republic. In 2013, Serageldin and the BA received the Calouste Gulbenkian International Prize for thoughts and actions that make a decisive contribution to, and have significant impact on understanding, defending and fostering the universal values of respect for diversity and difference, a culture of tolerance and the conservation of the environment. He has also received the Pablo Neruda Medal from Chile, India's Bajaj Prize for upholding Gandhian values outside India, and was the first recipient of the Grameen Prize for lifelong efforts to fight poverty, and received the Champion of Youth Award by the World Youth Congress in Canada.

=== Early years ===
Serageldin was graduated with First class honors in 1964 from Cairo University from which he holds a Bachelor of Science Degree in Engineering. In 1968, he earned his master's degree with distinction from Harvard University followed by a PhD from the same university four years later. Prior to joining the World Bank, he worked as a consultant in city and regional planning, and taught at Cairo University and Harvard University.

=== Career ===
Serageldin joined the World Bank through the Young Professionals Program after completing his Ph.D. at Harvard University.

Serageldin worked in a number of capacities in the World bank since joining in 1972 and became vice president for Environmentally Sustainable Development in October 1992 (effective January 1, 1993). Economist in education and human resources (1972–76); Division Chief for Technical Assistance and Special Studies (1977–80), and for Urban Projects in Europe, the Middle East and North Africa (1980–83); Director for Programs in West Africa (1984–87), Country Director for Central and Occidental Africa (1987–89), Technical Director for all Sub-Saharan Africa (1990–92), and vice-president for Environmentally and Socially Sustainable Development (1993–98). In addition, he was active in promoting NGO-Bank relations, and served as co-chairman of the NGO-Bank Committee (1997–99).

He has held many important international positions, including Vice President of the World Bank (1992-2000), and the 7th Chairman Consultative Group on International Agricultural Research (CGIAR, 1994–2000), founder and former chairman of the Global Water Partnership (GWP, 1996–2000) and the Consultative Group to Assist the Poorest (CGAP), a microfinance program (1995-2000) and was professor of the International Savoirs Contre Pauvreté (Knowledge Against Poverty), at Collège de France, Paris, and distinguished professor at Wageningen University in the Netherlands.

After a career of 28 years at the World Bank, Ismail Serageldin resigned on 10 July 2000 to return to his home country, Egypt. In a 2021 podcast interview, Serageldin reflected on his extensive career, including his roles at the World Bank and as Founding Director of the Library of Alexandria.

Currently, Serageldin is Emeritus Librarian, and member of the Board of Trustees of the Library of Alexandria. Throughout his career, Serageldin has been noted for introducing broader development considerations, including social issues, gender, environment, culture, and governance into development discourse. An advocate for the poor and marginalised, he worked to strengthen links between civil society and the Bank. A summary of Serageldin's career at the Bank is provided in the statement released by World Bank President James D. Wolfensohn on the occasion of Serageldin's retirement.

=== Currently ===
- Emeritus Librarian, Library of Alexandria
- Member of Board of Trustees of the Library of Alexandria
- Member of Board of Trustees of Beirut Arab University (BAU), Beirut
- Advisor to the Egyptian Prime Minister in matters concerning culture, science and museums
- Ambassador of the Alliance of Civilizations
- Chairman of the Executive Council of the World Digital Library (WDL).
- Chair and member of a number of Boards of Directors and advisory committees for academic, research, scientific and international institutions and civil society effort.
- Co-chair of the UNESCO supported World Water Scenarios (2013) and the executive council of the Encyclopedia of Life (2010).

=== Personal life ===
Ismail Serageldin was married to the late Mrs. Nevine Madkour with one son. He is tri-lingual: Arabic, French and English.

== Honorary degrees ==
- 1996: Doctor of Sociology, University of Bucharest, Romania
- 1996: Doctor of Agricultural Science, University of Melbourne, Australia
- 1997: Doctor of Science, Indian Agricultural Research Institute, India
- 1998: Doctor of International Affairs, American University, Washington, D.C., United States
- 1998: Doctor of Science, Punjab Agricultural University, India
- 1998: Doctor of Science, Tamil Nadu Veterinary and Animal Sciences University, India
- 1998: Doctor of Natural resource management, Ohio State University, United States
- 1999: Doctor of Science, Tamil Nadu Agricultural University, Coimbatore, India
- 1999: Doctor of Science, Acharya N. G. Ranga Agricultural University, Hyderabad, India
- 1999: Doctor of Economics and Management, CNAM, Paris, France
- 1999: Doctor of Science, Egerton University, Kenya
- 1999: Doctor of Agricultural Science, University of Tuscia, Italy
- 2000: Doctor of Humane Letters, American University in Cairo, Egypt
- 2002: Doctor of Science, Southern New Hampshire University, Manchester, New Hampshire, United States
- 2003: Doctor of Science, McGill University, Montreal, Quebec, Canada
- 2004: Doctor of Letters, University of Technology, Sydney, Australia
- 2004: Doctor of Letters, Paul Sabatier University, Toulouse, France
- 2005: Doctor of Laws, University of Minnesota, Minneapolis, United States
- 2006: Doctor of Letters, Université de Nantes, Nantes, France
- 2007: Doctor of Science, Azerbaijan State Economic University, Baku, Azerbaijan
- 2007: Doctor of Society Development, Khazar University, Baku, Azerbaijan
- 2008: Doctor of Letters, Laval University, Quebec City, Canada
- 2009: Doctor of Arts, Beirut Arab University, Beirut, Lebanon
- 2009: Doctor Diploma, Azerbaijan Cooperation University, Baku, Azerbaijan
- 2009: Doctor Diploma, National Academy of Sciences, Institute of History, Baku Azerbaijan
- 2009: Doctor of Letters, University of Dublin, Dublin, Ireland
- 2010: Doctor Degree, ANAS Institute of Oriental Studies, Baku, Azerbaijan
- 2010: Doctor Degree, Georgian American University, Tbilisi, Georgia
- 2010: Doctor Degree, Free University of Tbilisi, Georgia
- 2012: Doctor Degree, University of Georgia, Tbilisi, Georgia
- 2012: Doctor Degree, Ilia State University, Tbilisi, Georgia
- 2012: Doctor Degree, State Agricultural University, Ganja, Azerbaijan
- 2012: Doctor Degree, Odlar Yurdu State University, Baku, Azerbaijan
- 2015: Doctor of Humane Letters, American University of Beirut, Lebanon
- 2016: Doctor Honoris Causa of Sofia University St. Kliment Ohridski, Bulgaria.
- 2016: Doctor degree of Ganja State University, Azerbaijan.
- 2017: Doctor degree, Marin Barleti University, Tirana, Albania
- 2017: Doctor Degree, University of Latvia, Riga, Latvia

== Previous appointments ==
- Founding Director of the new Library of Alexandria (Bibliotheca Alexandrina) - (2002-2017)
- Professor of the International Chair “Savoirs contre Pauvreté” (Knowledge Against Poverty), Collège de France, (2010-2011).
- Distinguished University Professor at Wageningen University, the Netherlands.
- Co-chair of the African Biotechnology Panel (with Calestous Juma).
- Member of the High Level Group (HLG) of the Secretary-General's UN initiative for the Alliance of Civilizations, (2005-2006).
- Chairman of the Youth Employment Summit (YES) Campaign, (1998-2002).
- Ambassador of the Alliance of Civilizations.
- Special Advisor to the World Bank.
- Co-chair (with Jacob Palis) of the Inter-Academy Council Panel on Capacity Building in Science and Technology, (2002-2004).
- Distinguished Visiting Professor at the American University in Cairo (AUC), (2000/2001).
- Advisor to the Egyptian Government on the Bibliotheca Alexandrina.
- Vice President of the World Bank till July 2000, (for Environmentally and Socially Sustainable Development, from October 1992 to March 1998, and for Special Programs from March 1998 to July 2000)
- Chairman of Consultative Group on International Agricultural Research (CGIAR, 1994–2000).
- Chairman of Consultative Group to Assist the Poorest (CGAP), a microfinance program, (1995-2000).
- Chairman of the Global Water Partnership, (GWP, 1996–2000).
- Chairman, World Commission for Water in the 21st Century, (August 1998-March 2000).
- Vice President of the Academy of Sciences for the Developing World (TWAS).

He also worked in a number of capacities at:

- The World Bank since joining in 1972.
- Economist in Education and Human Resources (1972-1976)
- Division Chief for Technical Assistance and Special Studies (1977-1980)
- Urban Projects in Europe, the Middle East and North Africa (1980-1983)
- Director of Programs in West Africa (1984-1987)
- Country Director of Central and Occidental Africa (1987-1989)
- Technical Director of all Sub-Saharan Africa (1990-1992)
- Vice-president of Environmentally and Socially Sustainable Development (1993-1998).

== Professional memberships ==
- Vice President and member of Institut d'Egypte (Egyptian Academy of Science).
- Member of US National Academy of Sciences (Public Welfare Medalist).
- Member of the American Philosophical Society, Philadelphia.
- Member of the American Academy of Arts and Sciences.
- Member of Academy of Sciences of the Developing World (TWAS) Trieste, Italy.
- African Academy of Sciences.
- Bangladesh Academy of Science, Dhaka.
- National Academy of Agricultural Sciences, India.
- European Academy of Sciences and Arts, Austria.
- American Institute of Certified Planners (AICP).
- World Academy of Arts and Sciences, USA.
- Academia Bibliotheca Alexandrina (ABA).
- Science and Technology in Society (STS) Forum.
- The Royal Society of Arts and Sciences in Gothenburg.
- Supreme Council for Culture, Egypt.
- The International Academy of Food Science & Technology, Canada.
- Scientific Advisory Committee of the World Social Science Report 2013, UNESCO.
- Co-chair of the BoT of Nizami Ganjavi International Center.
- Honorary Academician of the Royal European Academy of Doctors, Barcelona, Spain.

== Awards ==
- 1999: First recipient of Grameen Foundation (USA) Award, for a lifetime commitment to combating poverty.
- 2003: Officer of the Order of Arts and Letters, awarded by the Government of France.
- 2004: Pablo Neruda Medal of Honor, awarded by the Government of Chile.
- 2006: The Jamnalal Bajaj Award, for promoting Gandhian values outside India.
- 2008: Order of the Rising Sun – Gold and Silver Star, awarded by the Emperor of Japan.
- 2008: Champion of Youth Award, by the World Youth Congress in Quebec.
- 2008: Knight of the French Legion of Honor, awarded by the President of France.
- 2010: The Dr. M. S. Swaminathan Award for Environmental Protection, (Chennai, India).
- 2010: Millennium Excellence Award for Lifetime Africa Achievement Prize, awarded by the Excellence Awards Foundation, Ghana.
- 2011: The Public Welfare Medal, by the National Academy of Sciences, Washington DC.
- 2011: Commander of the Order of Arts & Letters, awarded by the Government of France.
- 2013: Calouste Gulbenkian Prize, awarded by the Calouste Gulbenkian Foundation, Portugal.
- 2015: Nizami Ganjavi Gold Medal of the Republic of Azerbaijan awarded by Azerbaijan National Academy of Sciences
- 2015: The “Dostlug” Order (Order of Friendship) of Azerbaijan awarded by President of Azerbaijan
- 2016: Marianna V. Vardinoyannis Foundation Award 2016
- 2016: Honorary Sign of the President of the Bulgarian Academy of Sciences
- 2017: The Order of George Kastrioti Skanderbeg issued by the President of the Republic of Albania.

== Publications and speeches ==
Over 100 books and monographs (edited or authored), in addition to 500 articles, book chapters, and technical papers on various topics, some of which are:

- Water Supply, Sanitation, and Environmental Sustainability: The Financing Challenge, 1994.
- Nurturing Development, 1995.
- Sustainability and the Wealth of Nations, 1996.
- Milestones of Renewal: A Journey of Hope and Accomplishment, 1996.
- Architecture of Empowerment, 1997.
- Rural Well-Being: From Vision to Action, 1997, (with David Steeds).
- The Modernity of Shakespeare, 1998.
- Themes for the Third Millennium, the Challenge for Rural Sociology in an Urbanizing World, 1999.
- Biotechnology and Biosafety, 1999, (with Wanda Collins).
- Very Special Places, 1999.
- Promethean Science, 2000, (with G. Persley).
- Biotechnology and Sustainable Development: Voices of the South and North, 2003, (with G. Persley).
- Discovery to Delivery, 2005, (with G. Persley).
- Changing Lives, 2006, (with E. Masood).
- Born Digital, 2006.
- Reflections on Our Digital Future, 2006.
- Inventing Our Future: Essays on Freedom; Democracy and Reform in the Arab World, 2007. (2nd edition)
- Science: The Culture of Living Change, 2007. (2nd edition)
- Freedom of Expression, 2007.
- Islam and Democracy, 2008.
- The Shape of Tomorrow, 2010.
- The Arab Cultural Project, 2010.
- Mobiliser le savoir pour éradiquer la faim, (the college de France/Fayard, Paris 2011).
- The Making of Social Justice, (the 2011 Mandela Lecture, Johannesburg, South Africa).
- The Culture Of The Book: The Book Yesterday, Today and Tomorrow, 2012. DVD
- Reflections on Education: On Education and the Future of the Arab World: Tomorrow's Universities and the Seven Pillars of Knowledge Revolution, 2013.
- The Poetry of the Magnificent Sage, 2013.
- Shakespeare and the Burden of Leadership, 2013. DVD
- The Poetry of the Magnificent Sage, 2013. DVD
- Shakespeare's Henry V: Modern Reflections on a Medieval Hero, 2013. DVD
- Shakespeare's Richard II: Reflections of the Undoing of a King, 2013. DVD
- Public Health and Private Medicine: Looking Back and Looking Forward, 2013. DVD
- La Renaissance de la Bibliotheca Alexandrina, 2014. DVD
- Jurji Zaidan: The Man and his Legacy, 2014. DVD
- Hassan Fathy: Egypt's Visionary Architect, 2015. DVD
- Experiencing Alexandria: The City as Text and Context, 2015. DVD
- Global Ethics: Wise Words from the Sage of Ganja, 2015. DVD
- The Challenge: A Cultural Program to Reject Extremism and Violence, 2015.

== Television programs prepared, produced and presented by Serageldin ==
- Cairo Salon: A weekly program on Egypt's Channel One - 128 episodes.
- Muslim Scientists: A daily five-minute series aired throughout the month of Ramadan on Egypt's Channel One.
- Horizons: 15 science programs of 30 minutes each, presented in two versions in English and Arabic.
- Dialogues on Science: 6 episodes of 45 minutes each, in Arabic.
