= Bangladesh Academy of Sciences =

Science institution in Bangladesh

- Seal of Bangladesh Academy of Sciences
- Formation: 1973
- Headquarters: Agargaon, Dhaka, Bangladesh
- President: Abul Kalam Azad Chowdhury
- Website: bas.org.bd

The Bangladesh Academy of Sciences (BAS) is an academic forum for Bangladeshi scientists and technologists. Established in 1973, it aims to fulfill the role of promoting research and development of sciences in Bangladesh.

== History ==
After the Partition of India, the Pakistan Academy of Sciences was established in 1953. After the liberation of Bangladesh, 12 Bangladeshi fellows of the academy formed the Bangladesh Academy of Sciences in 1973, becoming 'Foundation Fellows'. Muhammad Qudrat-i-Khuda served the founding president role until 1976.

Since 2014, BAS has administered the digital library Bangladesh Journals OnLine (BanglaJOL).

== Presidents ==
- Muhammad Qudrat-i-Khuda (1973–1976)
- M Osman Ghani (1976–1988)
- S.D. Chaudhuri
- M. Shamsher Ali (2004–2012)
- Mesbahuddin Ahmad (2012–2015)
- Aminul Islam (2016–2017)
- Quazi Abdul Fattah (2017–2019)
- Abul Kalam Azad Chowdhury (2019–2025)
- Zahurul Karim (2025-current)

== Fellows ==
The Bangladesh Academy of Sciences (BAS) awards fellowships to distinguished individuals from Bangladesh and abroad in recognition of their exceptional contributions to various branches of science. The academy elects 'National Fellows' from among the most eminent scientists and technologists of Bangladesh.

=== Types of fellowships ===
- National fellows: The academy elects national fellows in recognition of their outstanding fundamental contributions to various branches of science. The number of national fellows is limited to 100.
- Associate fellows: The academy elects associate fellows who are relatively young scientists, below the age of 45, with higher degrees in research and exceptional talent and promise in the field of science and technology.
- Foreign fellows: The academy elects foreign fellows who are distinguished scientists from other countries.
- Honorary fellows: The academy elects honorary fellows who are eminent individuals who have made significant contributions to the promotion of science and technology.

=== National fellows ===
The 12 founding fellows are also included, but they are referred to as Foundation Fellows. According to the academy's policy, fellows are elected in this category in recognition of their outstanding original contributions to various branches of science. No more than 100 fellows are elected in this category. According to the policy, appointments are made until the number reaches 100, but no more than 10 fellows are appointed in any one year. If a selected member's position becomes vacant due to resignation, retirement, or death, a fellow is appointed to the vacancy in accordance with the guidelines for the election of fellows. The following list contains the names of all those who have so far been awarded fellowships in the national fellows category.

1973

- Muhammad Qudrat-i-Khuda
- Syed Hedayetullah
- Qazi Motahar Hossain
- M Osman Ghani
- Mafizuddin Ahmed
- Mokarram Hussain Khundker
- S.D. Chaudhuri
- Amirul Islam
- M Innas Ali
- Kamaluddin Ahmad
- S.M. Azizul Haque
- Nurul Islam

1974

- A.K.M. Siddiq
- Ashraful Haque

1975

- Muhammad Ibrahim
- Ahmad Hussain
- Wahiduddin Ahmed
- S.Z. Haider
- M.A.M. Muhtasham Hussain
- M. R. Khan
- A. M. Harun-ar-Rashid

1977

- Hiranmay Sen Gupta

1978

- M. Shamsher Ali
- Aminul Islam
- Syed Bazley Ali
- A.K.S. Ahmed
- M. Nurul Haque Khan

1979

- Fazlul Halim Chowdhury
- K.A. Latif

1980

- Ahmad Shamsul Islam
- AKM Nurul Islam
- Abdul Jabbar
- Abdus Salam

1981

- A.Q. Sarker

1982

- Syed Nurun Nabi

1983

- Abdul Matin Patwari
- Kazi M Badruddoza
- Jamal Nazrul Islam

1984

- Shah M. Hasanuzzaman

1985

- Sultan Ahmed Chowdhury
- Anwar Hossain

1988

- AKM Aminul Haque
- Mahmud-ul Ameen

1991

- Quazi Abdul Fattah

1992

- Mahmudur Rahman Choudhury
- Abdul Aziz Khan

1993

- Amir Hossain Khan

1995

- Zahurul Karim

1997

- A.M. Choudhury
- Mesbahuddin Ahmad
- Idris Ali

1998

- Jamilur Reza Choudhury
- Z.N. Tahmida Begum
- Arun Kumar Basak
- M.A. Hamid Miah
- Hajera Mahtab

1999

- Shariff Enamul Kabir
- Md. Anwar Hossain
- A.K.M. Azharul Islam
- Liaquat Ali
- Mohammad Kaykobad

2000

- A.K. Azad Khan
- K.M. Sultanul Aziz
- Syed Mohammad Humayun Kabir
- A.S.M. Matiur Rahman
- Naiyyum Choudhury
- Mosihuzzaman

2003

- M. Rezwan Khan
- Mesbahuddin Ahmed

2004

- M. Salimullah
- H.K.M. Yusuf
- Mohammad Ali Asgar

2005

- Shah M. Faruque

2006

- Abul Kalam Azad Chowdhury
- M. Feroze Ahmed

2008

- Firdausi Qadri

2010

- Choudhury Mahmood Hasan

2024

- Shafi Mohammad Tareq

=== Expatriate fellow ===
Eminent Bangladeshi scientists who are living abroad permanently or temporarily are awarded expatriate fellowships. No more than 20 fellows are elected in this category at the same time. However, up to three may be appointed in a single year until the quota of 20 is filled. The following list contains the names of all those who have so far been awarded fellowships in the expatriate fellows category.

- A. Saber M. Saleuddin
- Mohammed A. Karim
- A.N. Kamal
- Fazley Bary Malik
- Fazle Hussain
- Mushfequr Rahman
- Muhammad Munir Islam
- Mizanur Rahman
- A.K.M. Ehsanes Saleh
- Mir Masoom Ali

=== Foreign fellows ===
Foreign or international fellowships are awarded to eminent scientists who are not citizens of Bangladesh and who have made significant contributions to science or have special knowledge in the subject. The following list contains the names of all those who have so far been nominated as Foreign Fellows.

- Norman Borlaug
- Abdus Salam
- M. S. Swaminathan
- Jack Lewis
- Ashesh Prasad Mitra
- Ismail Serageldin
- Rita R. Colwell
- Ben Roy Mottelson
- Masatoshi Koshiba
- C. N. R. Rao
- Richard R. Ernst
- Louise Johnson
- Takao Nishizeki
- Richard P. Brent

=== Associate fellows ===
There can be a maximum of 15 fellows in the Associate Fellows category. This fellowship is generally awarded to young scientists who are under 45 years of age, have a higher research degree, and are exceptionally talented and promising in the field of science and technology. No more than 3 fellows are nominated in any one year. The following persons have been nominated as Associate Fellows.

- Abul Bashar Mir Mohammad Khademul Islam is a professor of mathematics at the University of Dhaka. He is known for his work on algebraic geometry and differential geometry.
- Abdullah Shams Bin Tariq is a professor of physics at the University of Chittagong. He is known for his work on nuclear physics and particle physics.
- Abul Hasnat is a professor of history at the University of Rajshahi. He is known for his work on the history of Bangladesh and the history of Islam.
- Mamun Mollah is a professor of economics at Jahangirnagar University. He is known for his work on development economics and microeconomics.
- Tanveer Ferdous Saeed is a professor of political science at the National University of Bangladesh. He is known for his work on political theory and comparative politics.
- Abu Reza Mohammad Taufiqul Islam is a professor of law at the University of Dhaka. He is known for his work on constitutional law and human rights law.
- AJ Saleh Ahmed is a professor of English at the University of Dhaka. He is known for his work on postcolonial literature and critical theory.

== Academy Gold Medal Awards ==
The academy awards prizes in senior and junior categories annually to scientists and technologists of Bangladesh in the fields of physical sciences (engineering and technology) and biological sciences (agriculture and medicine).

=== Physical sciences ===
| Year | Senior | Junior |
|---|---|---|
| 1982 | S. Z. Haider | S. M. Mujibur Rahman |
| 1984 | M. Shamsher Ali | |
| 1985 | Jamal Nazrul Islam | |
| 1986 | Syed Safiullah | M. Salimullah |
| 1988 | K. M. A. Malik | Saiful Islam |
| 1990 | M. Shamsher Ali; Md. Wahhaj Uddin | Khondkar Siddique-e-Rabbani |
| 1993 | Amir Hossain Khan | M. Salahuddin Khan |
| 1998 | Shariff Enamul Kabir | A. S. Md. Abdul Haseeb; Golam Mohammed Bhuiyan |
| 2002 | M. Salimullah | Junaid Amin As-Salek |
| 2003 | Arun Kumar Basak | Md. Saidur Rahman |
| 2004 | Mohammad Kaykobad | A A Mamun |
| 2005 | M. Rezwan Khan | Md. Arshad Momen |
| 2006 | A K M Azharul Islam | |
| 2007 | M. M. Shahidul Hassan | Tanvir Noor Baig |
| 2009 | Md. Tofazzal Hossain Tarafder | Md. Idrish Miah |
| 2010 | Anisul Haque; Mubarak Ahmad Khan | Md. Shuza Uddin |
| 2011 | A A Mamun | Mohammad Abul Hasnat |
| 2013 | | M. Ruhul Amin |
| 2024 | Shafi Mohammad Tareq | |

=== Biological sciences ===
| Year | Senior | Junior |
|---|---|---|
| 1982 | Nurul Islam | |
| 1984 | F. Z. Majid | Khurshid Jahan |
| 1985 | Mir Mosharraf Hossain | S. N. I. Md. Salehuzzaman |
| 1986 | Aminul Islam | S. A. M. Khairul Bashar |
| 1988 | S. M. Hasanuzzaman | Md. Abdus Sattar |
| 1990 | Mahmud-ul-Ameen | Lutfur Rahman Khan |
| 1993 | M. R. Choudhury | AKM Nurul Islam |
| 2002 | Md. Abdul Faiz | |
| 2003 | S. M. Imamul Huq | Md. Mukhlesur Rahman Khan |
| 2004 | Md. Rafiqul Islam | Md. Anwarul Azim Akhand |
| 2005 | Firdausi Qadri | Ali Azam Talukder |
| 2006 | Choudhury Mahmood Hasan | Md. Ekramul Hoque |
| 2007 | Muniruddin Ahmed | Md. Siddiqur Rahman |
| 2009 | M. Jahiruddin | Abdullah Harun Chowdhury |
| 2010 | Liaquat Ali | |
| 2011 | Md. Sirajul Islam | Md. Tofazzal Islam |
| 2013 | | Shafi Mohammad Tareq |
