= S.D. Chaudhuri =

Bangladeshi economic botanist (1917–1997)

- সাইফউদ-দীন চৌধুরী
- Born: October 1917
- Died: 1997 (aged 79–80)
- Education: Government College, Lahore; Presidency College, Calcutta; Imperial College of London
- Occupations: botanist, university academic

Saifud-Din Chaudhury (also known as Dr. S.D. Chowdhury) (October 1917 – 1997) was a Bangladeshi economic botanist, policy planner and university academic. He was a former Vice-chancellor of East Pakistan Agricultural University (later Bangladesh Agricultural University). He was a foundation fellow of Bangladesh Academy of Sciences since 1973. He also served as the president of the academy.

== Education ==
Chaudhury was a student of Government College, Lahore. He completed his bachelor's from Presidency College, Calcutta. He obtained his Ph.D. from the Imperial College of London. He then conducted research on plant breeding at the Beltsville Research Institute in the United States.

== Career ==
Chaudhury served as an economic botanist to the Government of Assam and the Government of East Pakistan. He then became the director of Jute Research Institute and Agriculture of East Pakistan.

Chaudhury was appointed a member of Planning Commission of the Government of Bangladesh in 1977. He also served as the president of Bangladesh Academy of Sciences.

== Personal life ==
Dr. Chowdhury was the son of Khan Bahadur Mahmud Chowdhuri and was from Rankeli, Golapgonj, Sylhet. He was the eldest of four brothers.

== Awards ==
- Tamgha-e-Imtiaz
- Sitara-e-Quaid-e-Azam
- Lions Gold Medal by Sylhet Lions Club
