= Syed Safiullah =

Bangladeshi academic

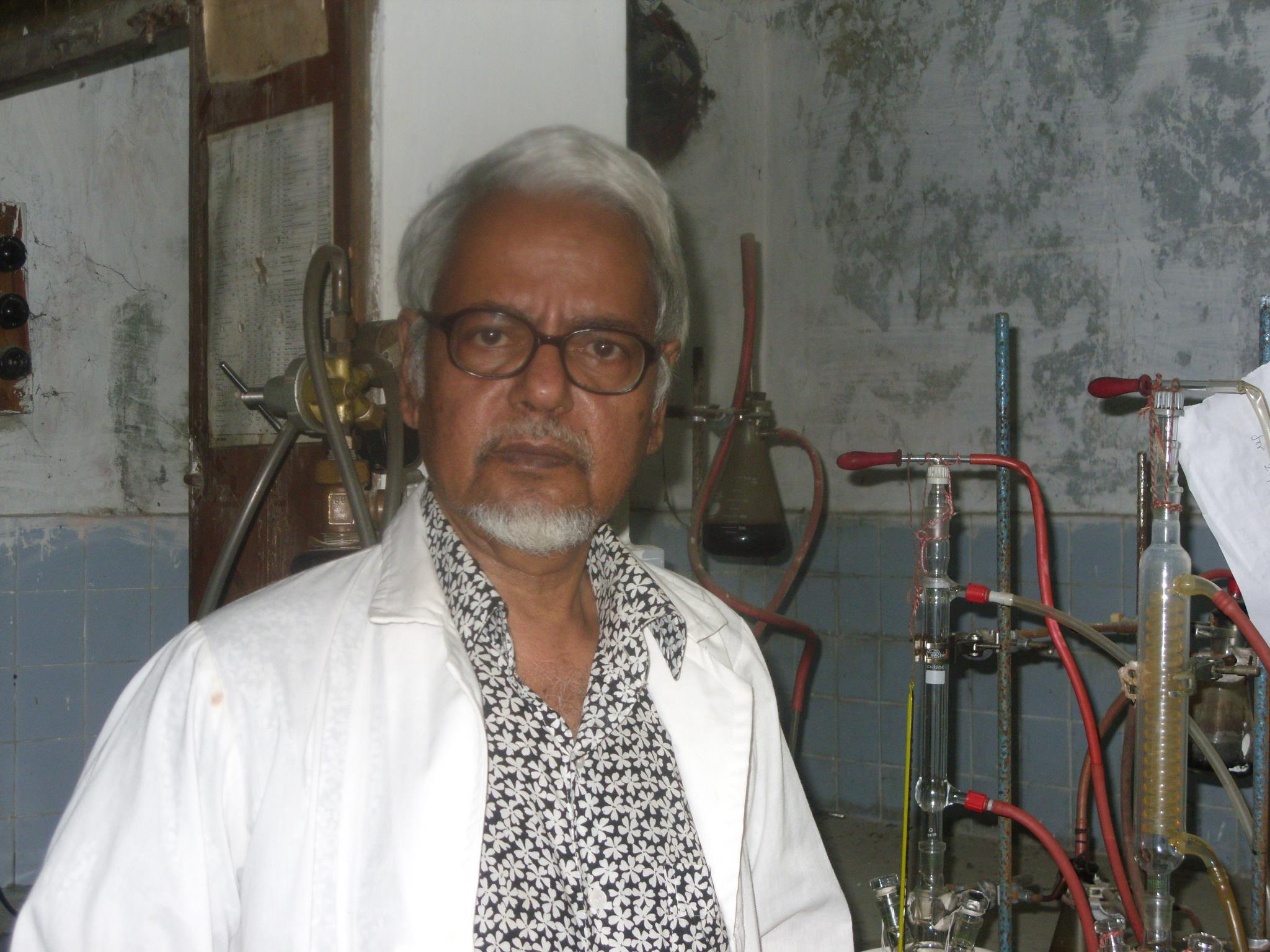
- Safiullah in 2010
- Born: 25 December 1945; Bagerhat, British India
- Died: 11 June 2016 (aged 70); Dhaka, Bangladesh
- Education: University College London (PhD)
- Occupation: Professor
- Years active: 1972–2012

Syed Safiullah (25 December 1945 – 11 June 2016) was a Bangladeshi academic of chemistry. He was a professor in the Faculty of Mathematical & Physical Sciences at Jahangirnagar University (JU), Bangladesh. He was widely recognized for his research and innovation of Shushama fertilizer and fish feed, Safi Filter, and Safi Fuel. Among other positions, he was the former professor of chemistry and founder chairperson of environmental sciences department and Institute of Life Science at Jahangirnagar University (JU). His areas of interest covered environmental, material, synthetic, and applied chemistry. Safiullah is known for his work on arsenic pollution investigations, organic matter characterizations and environmental chemistry.

Safiullah was a Fellow of TWAS, the World Academy of Sciences, as well as a Fellow of the Bangladesh Academy of Sciences. He was a fellow of the international union of pure and applied chemistry (IUPAC) and he was the first fellow of the Royal Society of Chemistry, UK from the Jahangirnagar University.

== Early life and education ==
Safiullah was born in Bagerhat, British India (now in Bangladesh) in 1945. He matriculated from Khulna Zilla School in 1960, and earned an Intermediate of Science at Comilla Victoria College in 1962. Safiullah received his BSc, and MSc degrees from the Department of Chemistry, Dhaka University in 1965 and 1966 respectively. He obtained his Ph.D. in 1971 from the University College London, in the UK. In UCL, he worked on organometallic chemistry. He was a Commonwealth Scholar in the UK.

== Awards ==
For his contribution to synthetic chemistry and discovery of the biogeochemical signatures for bimodal degradation in the flood plains of Bangladesh, he was awarded the Gold Medal of Bangladesh Academy of Sciences (Senior group) and the TWAS (Italy) in 1986.

== Publications ==
Professor Safiullah authored more than 250 original research papers, reviews, and 25 books on the frontiers of science, quantum consciousness, and environment related fields. His work has been published in scientific journals including: Nature, American Geophysical Union and Elsevier. He has published numerous articles on science, society and the environment. He has also published three books on poetry in the English language.
