= M. R. Khan =

Bangladeshi pediatrician

- এম আর খান
- Born: 1 August 1928
- Died: 5 November 2016 (aged 88); Dhaka, Bangladesh
- Resting place: Satkhira, Khulna Division
- Education: Calcutta Medical College
- Children: Mandy Karim

Mohammad Rafi Khan (1 August 1928 – 5 November 2016) was a Bangladeshi pediatrician from Satkhira. In 1994, he was selected as the National Professor of Bangladesh. He was awarded the Ekushey Padak in 2009 and the Independence Day Award in 2016 by the Government of Bangladesh. He has been a Fellow of the Bangladesh Academy of Sciences since 1975. He was the founder of Central Hospital, Dhaka.

== Education ==
Khan completed his MBBS from Calcutta Medical College in 1952. He completed post-graduate degrees from Edinburgh (1957, 1962 and 1978), London (1957) and Dhaka (1974).

== Career ==
In 1963, Khan joined Dhaka Medical College as an associate professor and retired as a professor of pediatrics at IPGMR in 1988. He established the pediatric unit in Rajshahi Medical College in 1964-1965 and strengthened Dhaka Shishu Hospital in 1978–1979. He was the founder president of Bangladesh Pediatric Association.

He served as a senior visiting professor of the International Centre for Diarrhoeal Disease Research, Bangladesh since 1989; professor and founder director and chairman of the Institute of Child Health and Shishu Hospital.

== Personal life ==
He was married to Anwara Khan, who died in 2012. They had one daughter, Mandy Karim.

== Books ==
Khan wrote nine books including the following:

- Practice of Paediatrics Medicine
- An Essential Aid on Paediatrics Medicine
- Essence of Paediatrics with Prof. M. Ekhlasur Rahman

== Awards ==
- Independence Day Award (2016)
- Ekushey Padak (2009)
- Gold Medal by the Ministry of Social Welfare (1999)
- Ibn Sina Gold Medal (1999)
- Khan Bahadur Ahsanullah Gold Medal (1998)
- Poet Sorojine Naidu Gold Medal (1997)
- National Professor, People's Republic of Bangladesh, (1995)
- Bangladesh Pediatric Association Award (1994)
- Moulana Bhashani Gold Medal (1994)
- Moulana Tarko Baghis Gold Medal Award (1993)
- Poet Kazi Nazrul Islam National Award and Gold Medal (1993)
- Gold Medal by Sher-e-Bangla Jatiyo Smrity Sangsad (1992)
- World Astrological Society Award (1992)
- Association of Pediatrics from South East Asia Region, Manila Award (1991)
