= National Professor =

National Professor জাতীয় অধ্যাপক
- Type: National Civilian
- Country: Bangladesh
- Presented by: Government of Bangladesh
- Established: 1975
- First award: 1975
- Final award: 2021

Highlights
- Total: 25

National Professor (Bengali: জাতীয় অধ্যাপক, romanized: Jatiẏô ôdhyapôk) is a teaching award given by the government of Bangladesh for outstanding contribution in the field of education. It is awarded by the President of Bangladesh according to Bangladesh National Professor Resolution (appointment, conditions and facilities) 1981. The awarded persons receive various facilities from the government.

- They will receive a fixed amount of salary through the University Grants Commission.
- They will be able to do any educational/research work in with any research organisation/institute in their choice.
- They will receive all the facilities from the respected organisations/institutes.
- They will be able to join any foreign university as visiting professor.
- They will not be able to take any salary from any other organisations/institutes except the government.
- They will not be treated as government officers.

== List of National Professors ==
- 1975
  - Zainul Abedin
  - Abdur Razzaq
  - Qazi Motahar Hossain
- 1984
  - Muhammad Ibrahim
- 1987
  - Nurul Islam
  - Abul Fazl Atwar Husain
  - Syed Ali Ahsan
- 1993
  - Dewan Mohammad Azraf
  - Shamsul Hoque
  - M Innas Ali
- 1994
  - MR Khan
  - Sufia Ahmed
- 1998
  - Kabir Chowdhury
- 2006
  - Abdul Malik
  - AKM Nurul Islam
  - AKM Aminul Haque
  - Talukder Moniruzzaman
- 2011
  - Sardar Fazlul Karim
  - A.F. Salahuddin Ahmed
  - Rangalal Sen
  - Mustafa Nurul Islam
  - Shahla Khatun
- 2018
  - Rafiqul Islam
  - Anisuzzaman
  - Jamilur Reza Choudhury
- 2021
  - A K Azad Khan
  - Alamgir Mohammad Sirajuddin
  - Mahmud Hassan
- 2026
  - Mahbub Ullah
