= AKM Nurul Islam (botanist) =

Bangladeshi botanist (1928–2006)

- একেএম নুরুল ইসলাম
- Born: 27 October 1928; Natore, Bengal Presidency, British India
- Died: 1 July 2006 (aged 77); Dhaka, Bangladesh
- Education: University of Dhaka; Michigan State University
- Occupation: Botanist

AKM Nurul Islam (27 October 1928 – 1 July 2006) was a Bangladeshi botanist and academician. He was selected as the National Professor of Bangladesh in 2006. He was a Fellow of Bangladesh Academy of Sciences since 1980 and Bangladesh Botanical Society since 1997.

== Education ==
Nurul Islam passed matriculation and intermediate science examinations from KD High School and Rajshahi Government College in 1945 and 1947 respectively. He earned his bachelor's from Rajshahi Government College in 1949 and master's from University of Dhaka in 1951. He then completed his Ph.D. in physiology from Michigan State University.

== Career ==
Nurul Islam joined the Kushtia College as a lecturer in biology and then served in the biology and botany departments of the University of Dhaka as lecturer (1952–1962), reader (1962–1972), professor (1972–1990), supernumerary professor (1991–2000) and honorary professor (2001–2006).

Nurul Islam served as the president of the Asiatic Society of Bangladesh during 1992-94 and the Bangladesh Botanical Society during 1985–1986.

== Works ==
Nurul Islam had 194 publications on phycology.

- Study of the Marine Algae of Bangladesh (1976)
- Centuries of planned studies in Bangladesh and Adjacent Regions (1991)
- Gachgachali (1976)
- Anaya Kano Sur (1991)
- Quraner Gachpala

== Awards ==
- Academy Gold Medal by Bangladesh Academy of Sciences (1993)
