= Talukder Moniruzzaman =

Bangladeshi political scientist (1938–2019)

- তালুকদার মনিরুজ্জামান
- Born: 1 July 1938
- Died: 29 December 2019 (aged 81)
- Occupations: Academic, Political Scientist

Talukder Moniruzzaman was a Bangladeshi academic and political scientist. He was selected as a National Professor by the Government of Bangladesh in 2006.

== Biography ==
Moniruzzaman was born on 1 July 1938 at Tarakandi in Sirajganj. He was admitted to Dhaka University's political science department in 1956. He completed his graduate and postgraduate studies from there.

After obtaining a postgraduate degree from Dhaka University, Moniruzzaman went to Canada in 1963 and was admitted to Queen's University. He returned to his country in 1966 and joined Rajshahi University. He taught there until 1974.

Moniruzzaman joined Dhaka University in 1974. He retired from there in 2006. He was inducted as a National Professor by the Bangladesh government the same year. He was also involved in writing books, writing a total of nine books.

Moniruzzaman was married to Razia Aktar Banu. They had two sons and one daughter.

Moniruzzaman died on 29 December 2019 in Apollo Hospital, Dhaka at the age of 81.
