= M. Rezwan Khan =

Bangladeshi academic

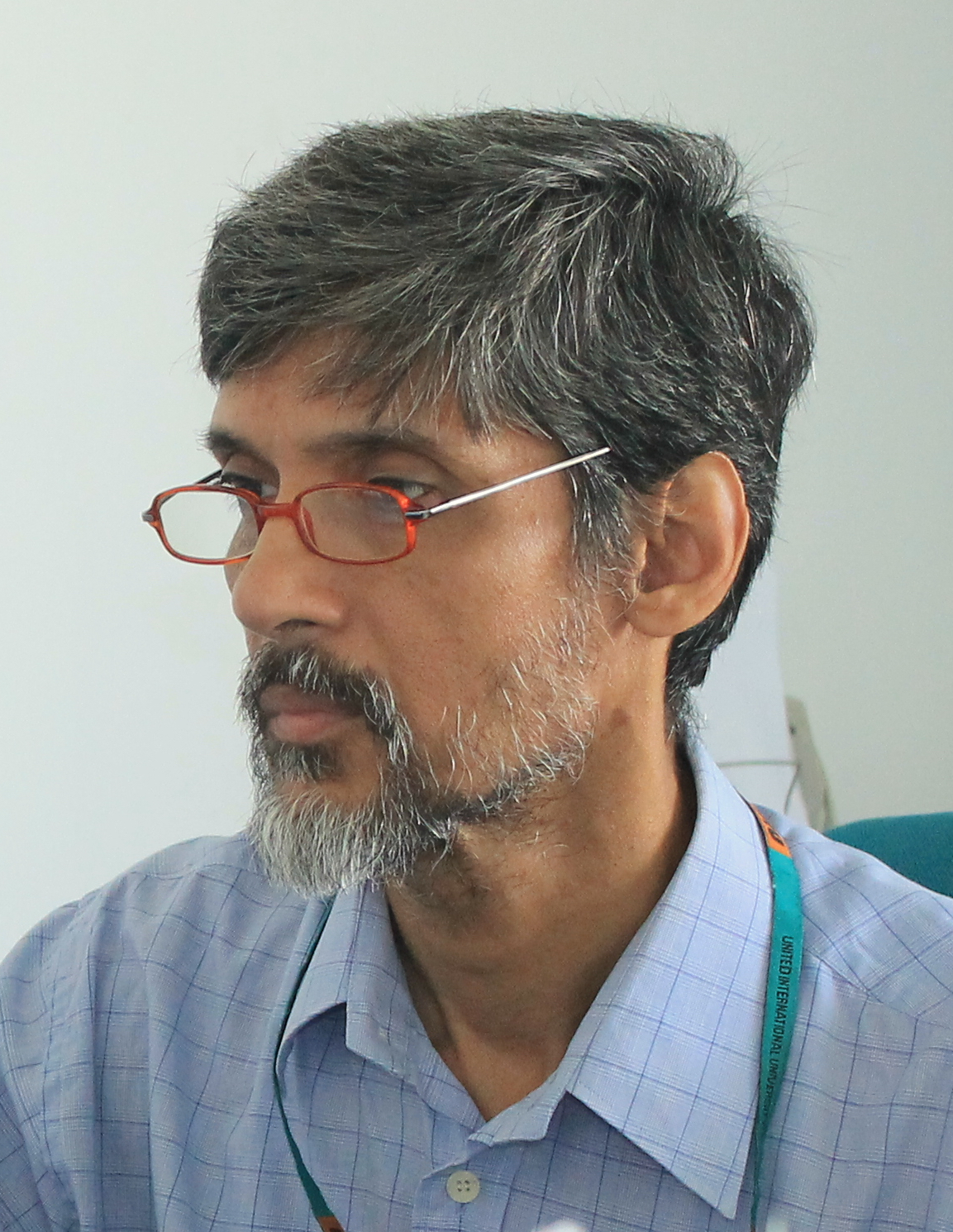
- Khan in 2013

Chairman of Power Grid Bangladesh
- Incumbent
- Assumed office 23 October 2024

Personal details
- Education: Bangladesh University of Engineering and Technology; University College London

Mohammad Rezwan Khan is a Bangladeshi academic and former vice-chancellor of United International University. He is a Fellow at Bangladesh Academy of Sciences. He is now Chairman of Power Grid Bangladesh.

== Education and career ==
Khan completed his bachelor's degree from Bangladesh University of Engineering and Technology (BUET) in 1980. He earned his MS and Ph.D. from University College London in 1982 and 1986 respectively.

Khan served as a faculty member at the department of electrical and electronics engineering of BUET from 1980 until 2005. Khan was selected as a distinguished lecturer of IEEE for his research work on DC Power system for the year of 2017–2018. He contributed in popularizing solar home system in Bangladesh under the RERED Project (jointly financed by Govt. of Bangladesh and World Bank).

== Research and works ==
He was honored with many reputed awards. He has been selected as Distinguished Lecturer of IEEE for his outstanding research work on DC Power system for the year of 2017–2018. IEEE is the World Largest Professional association for the Electrical and Electronic Engineers. He received the ‘Dana Chase Memorial Award’ for the best paper "A Novel Dehumidification Technique Using Electric Field" presented at the 45th International Appliance Technical Conference held at Madison, Wisconsin, USA. He also received the ‘Best Presentation Award’ in the same conference. The technique involves high electric field to attract water molecules in the air to be removed from a closed room without condensation. It is a well-known fact that water has a very high latent heat of condensation. As the process avoids condensation of moisture, it is highly energy efficient and can save significant level of energy consumption in dehumidifiers. He was presented with the Prime Minister's Award for outstanding contribution in popularizing Solar Home System in Bangladesh under the RERED Project (jointly financed by Govt. of Bangladesh and World Bank) implemented by Infrastructure Development Company Limited (IDCOL), Bangladesh, September 6, 2005. He was awarded with the ‘Gold Medal’ by the Bangladesh Academy of Sciences in 2005 for outstanding research contribution in the field of Engineering and Technology. Prof. Iaj Udding Ahmed, President, People's Republic of Bangladesh handed out the award. He is the senior member in IEEE. He is also the member in the Institute of Engineers, Bangladesh and Fellow in Bangladesh Academy of Sciences. Dr. Rezwan has numerous well-known journals. He also got published books and contributed in articles as well. He has attended numerous conferences, seminars and workshops around the world. His work in research field is massive and received funds for the innovative research works. Microwaves and Modern Optics is his specialized field. Dr. Rezwan has gathered around 35 years of experience in the research industry.

== Awards ==
- Gold Medal by Bangladesh Academy of Sciences (2005)
- Prime Minister's Award (2005)
- Dana Chase Memorial Award at the 45th International Appliance Technical Conference (1994)
