= M. Shamsher Ali =

Bangladeshi academic (1937–2025)

- Born: 21 November 1937; Bheramara, Kushtia, Bengal Province, British India
- Died: 3 August 2025 (aged 87); Dhaka, Bangladesh
- Education: Jessore Zilla School; University of Dhaka; Manchester University
- Scientific career
- Fields: Theoretical physics
- Workplaces: Bangladesh Open University; Southeast University
- Website: mshamsherali.com

M. Shamsher Ali (Bengali: ডঃ এম. শমশের আলী; 21 November 1937 – 3 August 2025), also known as Allama M. Shamser Ali, was a Bangladeshi physicist, educator and Islamic scholar. He served as the President of the Bangladesh Academy of Sciences, Vice-Chancellor of Southeast University, and the founding Vice-Chancellor of Bangladesh Open University.

== Early life and education ==
M. Shamsher Ali was born on 21 November 1937 in Bheramara Upazila, Kushtia, then part of the Nadia District, Bengal Province, British India. His family hailed from Singia, Jashore. He completed his BSc (Hons) and MSc in Physics from Dhaka University before earning his PhD in Theoretical Nuclear Physics from the University of Manchester in 1965. He has further studied Islam and Sufism and worked with Islamic Foundation Bangladesh. He was an ardent follower of Allama Shaikh Sayyid Manzoor Ahmed Uwaysi (QS).

== Career ==
Ali served as a Professor of Physics at the University of Dhaka from 1982 to 2006. Prior to his academic tenure, he was affiliated with the International Centre for Theoretical Physics in Trieste, Italy, and held key positions at both the Pakistan and Bangladesh Atomic Energy Commissions. Notably, he served as Director of the Bangladesh Atomic Energy Commission in Dhaka between 1970 and 1978.

Ali also played a prominent role in academic leadership, becoming the founding Vice-Chancellor of Bangladesh Open University and later Vice-Chancellor of Southeast University in Dhaka. From 2004 to 2012, he served as President of the Bangladesh Academy of Sciences. Dr. M. Shamsher Ali co-developed a potential in the late 1960s with A. R. Bodmer while working in the UK. Their 1966 paper ("Phenomenological α–α potentials") proposed a mathematical form for the α–α interaction that could reproduce observed scattering data and the properties of the ^8Be nucleus, which is essentially two alpha particles weakly bound together and it is taught in advanced nuclear physics courses and referenced in research on cluster models of nuclei.

== Death ==
Ali died at a hospital in Dhaka, Bangladesh, on 3 August 2025, at the age of 87.

== Academic memberships ==
- Fellow of the Bangladesh Physical Society
- Fellow of the Bangladesh Academy of Sciences
- Member, Board of Governors, National Council of Science and Technology, Bangladesh, (1978–1981)
- Senior & Honorary Associate, the Abdus Salam International Center for Theoretical Physics, Trieste, Italy.
- Fellow, Islamic World Academy of Sciences (IAS), Jordan.
- Fellow, Bangladesh Academy of Sciences.
- Fellow, Bangla Academy

== Books ==
=== Author ===
- Aladdin's Real Lamp (Sucheepatra, 2013. OCLC 769102360. 248 pages)

=== Editor ===
- Scientific Indications in the Holy Qur'an (Islamic Foundation Bangladesh)
- Muslim Contribution to Science and Technology (Islamic Foundation Bangladesh)

=== Contributor ===
- Oliver Leaman, The Qur'an: an Encyclopedia (Routledge, 2005. ISBN 978-0415775298. 800 Pages)
