= Saidur Rahman (computer scientist) =

Professor

- সাইদুর রহমান
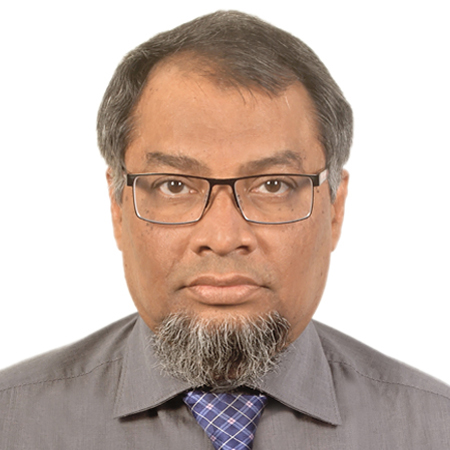
- Born: December 31, 1966 (age 59); Bangladesh
- Education: Tohoku University, Bangladesh University of Engineering and Technology
- Known for: Graph Drawing, Graph Algorithms, Computational Geometry
- Scientific career
- Fields: Computer Science; Computer Engineering; Graph Theory
- Workplaces: Bangladesh University of Engineering and Technology
- Website: saidurrahman.buet.ac.bd

Saidur Rahman (Bengali: সাইদুর রহমান) is a Bangladeshi computer scientist and graph theorist. He is a professor at Bangladesh University of Engineering and Technology.

He is an author of the book Planar Graph Drawing. He is known for his contribution in graph drawing, graph algorithms, computational geometry, and several other branches of theoretical computer science. Together with his student Md. Iqbal Hossain he defined an interesting structure of spanning trees in embedded planar graphs called good spanning trees.

== Education ==
Rahman completed his Ph.D. on graph drawing algorithms under the supervision of Dr. Takao Nishizeki of Tohoku University, Japan in 1999. He also worked as a JSPS postdoctoral fellow and as an associate professor in Tohoku University during the period 2001–2004. He completed his master's degree in Engineering from Bangladesh University of Engineering and Technology, Bangladesh, in 1992.

== Career ==
Rahman joined Bangladesh University of Engineering and Technology in 1991. After receiving his PhD, he returned to BUET in 2004, and formed a research group consisting of undergraduate and graduate students in its Department of Computer Science and Engineering, Bangladesh University of Engineering and Technology], in 2005. Since then he is doing research on various areas of graph algorithms and applications.

Together with Dr. Takao Nishizeki, Rahman wrote a graduate textbook Planar Graph Drawing, which was published by World Scientific in 2004. He also wrote an undergraduate textbook Basic Graph Theory published by Springer in 2017.

== WALCOM ==
In 2007, with the support from Bangladesh Academy of Sciences (BAS), Rahman played the leading role in initiating and establishing the International Workshop on Algorithms and Computation (WALCOM).

== Awards and honors ==
He was recognized as a fellow of Bangladesh Academy of Sciences (BAS) in a comparatively young age. He has received an Information Technology Award 2004 for his contributions in Graph Drawing Algorithms. Rahman has also received Bangladesh Academy of Sciences (BAS) Gold Medal 2003 in the junior group, and University Grants Commission Award 2004.

== Selected publications ==
Books

- Rahman, Md. Saidur (2017), Basic Graph Theory, Undergraduate Topics in Computer Science, Springer, ISBN 978-3-319-49475-3.
- Nishizeki, Takao; Rahman, Md. Saidur (2004), Planar Graph Drawing, Lecture Notes Series on Computing, vol. 12, World Scientific, doi:10.1142/5648, ISBN 978-981-256-033-9, MR 2112244.

Research articles

- Durocher, S.; Mondal, D.; Rahman, Md. S. (2015), "On graphs that are not PCGs", Theoretical Computer Science, 571: 78–87, doi:10.1016/j.tcs.2015.01.011.
- Rahman, Md. S.; Nishizeki, T.; Ghosh, S. (2004), "Rectangular drawings of planar graphs.", Journal of Algorithms, 50 (1): 62–78, doi:10.1016/S0196-6774(03)00126-3.
- Rahman, Md. S.; Nakano, S.-I.; Nishizeki, T. (1998), "Rectangular grid drawings of plane graphs", Computational Geometry, 10 (3): 203–220, doi:10.1016/S0925-7721(98)00003-0.
- Nakano, S.-I.; Rahman, Md. S.; Nishizeki, T. (1997), "A linear-time algorithm for four-partitioning four-connected planar graphs.", Information Processing Letters, 62 (6): 315–322, doi:10.1016/S0020-0190(97)00083-5, S2CID 981756.
- Md. Iqbal Hossain, Md. Saidur Rahman: "Good spanning trees in graph drawing". Theor. Comput. Sci. 607: 149-165 (2015)
- Shaheena Sultana, Md. Iqbal Hossain, Md. Saidur Rahman, Nazmun Nessa Moon, Tahsina Hashem: On triangle cover contact graphs. Comput. Geom. 69: 31-38 (2018)
- Rahnuma Islam Nishat, Debajyoti Mondal, Md. Saidur Rahman: Point-set embeddings of plane 3-trees. Comput. Geom. 45(3): 88-98 (2012)
- Debajyoti Mondal, Rahnuma Islam Nishat, Md. Saidur Rahman, Sue Whitesides: Acyclic coloring with few division vertices. J. Discrete Algorithms 23: 42-53 (2013)
