= Sharif Muhammad Azizul Haque =

- Born: 1 February 1924; Bagerhat, Khulna District, Bengal Presidency, British India
- Died: 13 April 2016 (aged 92)
- Occupation: Mathematician
- Awards: Foundation Fellow of the Bangladesh Academy of Sciences (1973)

Sharif Muhammad Azizul Haque (also known as S. M. Azizul Haque) (February 1, 1924 – April 13, 2016) was a Bangladeshi professor and mathematician. He served as the head of the Department of Mathematics and the Dean of the Faculty of Science at Dhaka University. Following Bangladesh's independence, he was one of the 12 Bangladeshi scientists who played a key role in establishing the Bangladesh Academy of Sciences. Additionally, he served as the Chairman of the General Insurance Corporation and as the founding president of the Bangladesh Mathematical Society.

== Early life ==
Azizul Haque was born on February 1, 1924, in the village of Astail in Udaypur Union, Mollahat Upazila, Bagerhat District of present-day Bangladesh. His father was Abdul Wajid Sharif, and his mother was Matiunnesa. He completed his primary education at Mollahat English Middle School, Ikhri Katenga English School in Khulna, and Wajid Memorial High School in Mollahat. In 1940, he passed his secondary education with first division under the University of Calcutta. He completed his higher secondary studies in 1942 at Presidency College. Subsequently, he earned his bachelor's and master's degrees in applied mathematics from the University of Calcutta. He achieved first division in almost all his academic examinations.

== Career ==
After completing his education, Azizul Haque joined as a Customs Appraiser in Kolkata in 1947. Following the Partition of India, he worked in the same position in Chattogram and Khulna during the latter part of that year. In January 1948, he joined the Mathematics Department of Dhaka University as a lecturer and, in August of the same year, went to Imperial College London on a government scholarship for a Ph.D. On November 1, 1950, he was promoted to Reader (Associate Professor) at Dhaka University.

In 1952, he participated in the "Foreign Student Summer Project" at the Massachusetts Institute of Technology. In 1954, he worked as an advisor for a UNESCO symposium held in Tokyo. From 1957 to 1958, he served as a research officer in the Mathematics Department of Manchester University under the Nuffield Foundation Fellowship. Between 1962 and 1963, he was a professor at Florida State University, and from 1963 to 1964, he taught at the University of Hawaii.

At Dhaka University, he was promoted to professor in 1962 but had already been serving as the head of the department since 1954. Except for his time abroad, he remained the head of the Mathematics Department from 1954 to 1975. In 1965, he served as the chairperson of the Physics, Mathematics, Statistics, Astronomy, and Meteorology Division of the Pakistan Association for the Advancement of Science.

From 1966 to 1972, Azizul Haque was the provost of Jahurul Haq Hall (formerly Iqbal Hall) at Dhaka University. He also served as the Dean of the Faculty of Science from 1972 to 1973. He retired from Dhaka University in 1982.

Outside of teaching, he was also an actuary. He was affiliated with the Institute of Actuaries in London and worked as an insurance consultant in both Pakistan and Bangladesh. When the insurance corporation was established in Bangladesh, he was appointed Chairman of the General Insurance Corporation. He held this position from 1973 to 1976. In 1972, he co-founded the Bangladesh Mathematical Society and served as its president.

== Honors ==
Azizul Haque was elected a Fellow of the Pakistan Academy of Sciences in 1970 and became a founding Fellow of the Bangladesh Academy of Sciences in 1973.

== Death ==
Azizul Haque died on April 13, 2016, at the age of 92.
