= Bangladesh Journals Online =

Service for access to published research

Bangladesh Journals OnLine
- Producer: Bangladesh Academy of Sciences (Bangladesh)
- History: September 2007 to present
- Languages: English

Access
- Cost: Free

Coverage
- Disciplines: Multidisciplinary
- Record depth: Index, abstract & full-text
- Format coverage: Academic journal articles, Conference papers, and Multimedia files
- Geospatial coverage: Bangladesh

Links
- Website: www.banglajol.info
- Title list(s): www.banglajol.info

Bangladesh Journals OnLine (BanglaJOL) is a project started by the International Network for the Availability of Scientific Publications (INASP) funded by the Department of International Development of the British Government to encourage open access of information.

== History ==
INASP initiated BanglaJOL in June 2007 and officially launched it in September 2007. The Bangladesh Academy of Sciences assumed management of BanglaJOL in 2014.

It is a database of open access journals published in Bangladesh, dealing with the full range of academic disciplines including both paper based and online only publications. Aim of the project is to make participating peer-reviewed journals' high visibility, high readership and open access over the internet by providing access to tables of contents (ToCs), abstracts and full-text.

== See also ==
- Open Journal Systems
- African Journals OnLine
