= Bangladesh Society of Microbiologists =

Bangladesh Society of Microbiologists (BSM) is an association of Bangladeshi Microbiologists.

== History ==
The Bangladesh Society of Microbiologists (BSM) was established in 1976 by a few researchers and intellectuals from Bangladesh. From the period of its establishment, it has emerged as the largest association of intellectuals and researchers in Bangladesh.

The founder president of the society was Major General M. R. Choudhury (Mahmudur Rahman Choudhury) who died on June 24, 1999. Under his able leadership, BSM over a short period of time succeeded in creating awareness about the importance of Microbiology in Bangladesh amongst those who matter. As a result, the University of Dhaka created a full-fledged Department of Microbiology.

== Founders ==
- Major General M R Choudhury
- Professor Aminul Islam,
- Dr. K.M.S. Aziz,
- Dr. Imdadul Huq,
- Dr. Farida Huq,
- Professor Naiyyum Choudhury
- Professor Khairul Bashar,
- Professor M.R. Khan,
- Major General Matiur Rahman,
- Mr. G.K. Joardar,
- Professor S.S. Qadri,
- Professor Mamun Rashid Chowdhury,
- Dr. Mohosin Patwary,
- Dr. Fazle Rabbi,
- Dr. Ansar Ali,
- Dr. Shahjahan Kabir,
- Dr. Syeda Quadsia Akhter (late),
- Dr. Syed Ashraf Ahmed,
- Dr. Firdausi Qadri,
- Dr. Mohammed Rahmatullah,
- Dr. M. Showkat Ali,
- Dr. M.A. Rahim and others.

== Web site ==
- Bangladesh Society of Microbiologist
