= Saidur Rahman (mechanical engineer) =

Malaysian academic

- Title: Distinguished Research Professor; Full professor

Academic background
- Education: University of Malaya
- Thesis: An application of energy and exergy analysis in residential sector of Malaysia (2007 (University of Malaya))

Academic work
- Discipline: Mechanical Engineering
- Sub-discipline: Renewable energy; nanofluids; energy efficiency, heat transfer; energy policy
- Institutions: Sunway University, Lancaster University

Saidur Rahman is a professor of engineering, specialising in renewable energy, nanofluids, energy efficiency, heat transfer, and energy policy. He serves as the head of the Research Centre for Nano-Materials and Energy Technology at Sunway University. He also holds a full professorship in the Department of Engineering at Lancaster University, UK.

== Education and career ==
Rahman obtained his PhD in energy, from the University of Malaya, Malaysia, in 2008. He completed his Master of Engineering Science (MEngSc) at the same institution in 2001. He obtained his Bachelor of Science in Engineering (BSc Eng) in mechanical engineering from the Bangladesh University of Engineering and Technology (BUET) in 1997.

Rahman has previously served as the chair professor at the Center of Research Excellence in Renewable Energy at King Fahd University of Petroleum and Minerals. Prior to that appointment, he had worked at University of Malaya.

== Recognitions and awards ==
Thomson Reuters recognized him as a Highly Cited Researcher for ranking in the top 1% of cited authors in his field based on publications from 2014 to 2016. Professor Rahman received the University of Malaya's highest accumulated citation award for four consecutive years (2011–2014)

According to AD Scientific World Scientist and University Ranking 2025 index, he was rank number 1 (first) in Asia and number 7 globally among the top 10 scientist with significant research contributions in the field of Mechanical Engineering.

== Publications ==
Saidur has authored over 350 academic papers throughout his career.

- Naseri, Ali; Bidi, Mokhtar; Ahmadi, Mohammad H.; Saidur, R. (2017). "Exergy analysis of a hydrogen and water production process by a solar-driven transcritical CO 2 power cycle with Stirling engine". Journal of Cleaner Production. 158. Elsevier BV: 165–181. doi:10.1016/j.jclepro.2017.05.005. ISSN 0959-6526.
- Koca, Halil Dogacan; Doganay, Serkan; Turgut, Alpaslan; Tavman, Ismail Hakki; Saidur, R.; Mahbubul, Islam Mohammed (2018). "Effect of particle size on the viscosity of nanofluids: A review". Renewable and Sustainable Energy Reviews. 82. Elsevier BV: 1664–1674. Bibcode:2018RSERv..82.1664K. doi:10.1016/j.rser.2017.07.016. ISSN 1364-0321.
- Amani, Pouria; Amani, Mohammad; Saidur, R.; Yan, Wei-Mon (2017). "Hydrodynamic performance of a pulsed extraction column containing ZnO nanoparticles: Drop size and size distribution". Chemical Engineering Research and Design. 121. Elsevier BV: 275–286. Bibcode:2017CERD..121..275A. doi:10.1016/j.cherd.2017.03.017. ISSN 0263-8762.
- "Investigation of energy saving potentials in T-junction and elbow in compressed air systems". Research Portal. 24 April 2012.
- Abdullah, Norulsamani; Zaed, Md Abu; Han, Tan Kim; Saidur, R. (1 April 2026). "Seawater as a sustainable feedstock for hydrogen production: Problems, solutions, and potential insights". Renewable and Sustainable Energy Reviews. 229 116619. doi:10.1016/j.rser.2025.116619. ISSN 1364-0321.
- delos Reyes, Ronald Allan S.; Rahman, Saidur; Han, Tan Kim; Arillas, John Ryan Dave M.; De Chavez, Aizheen Ricky G.; Gelera, John Russell F. (1 March 2026). "The effect of foam pore size, density and the use of MXene on the thermal conductivity and flexural strength of PU-foam roofing panel samples". Hybrid Advances. 12 100587. doi:10.1016/j.hybadv.2025.100587. ISSN 2773-207X.
