= M Osman Ghani =

Bangladeshi scientist, educationist, and academic (c. 1912–1989)

11th Vice-Chancellor of the University of Dhaka
- In office 20 February 1963 – 1 December 1969
- Preceded by: Mahmud Hussain
- Succeeded by: Abu Sayeed Chowdhury

1st Vice-Chancellor of Bangladesh Agricultural University
- In office 1961–1963
- Preceded by: Position established

Personal details
- Born: 1 March 1912 Gozadia village, Kishoreganj District, Bengal Presidency, British India
- Died: 21 July 1989 (aged 77)
- Relations: M. Osman Siddique (son); Osman Faruk (son)
- Education: University of Dhaka; University of London
- Occupation: Scientist, academic

Muhammad Osman Ghani (Bengali: মোহাম্মদ ওসমান গণি; 1 March 1912 – 21 July 1989) was a Bangladeshi scientist, educationist, and academic. He served as the 11th vice-chancellor of the University of Dhaka.

== Early life and education ==
Ghani was born on 1 March 1912, to a Bengali Muslim family in the village of Gazadia in Karimganj, Kishoreganj, Bengal Presidency. His parents were Haji Muhammad Darbar Ali and Maqbula Begum. He completed primary and middle school in his village, before enrolling to the Department of Chemistry at the University of Dhaka. In 1935, Ghani became the first South Asian Muslim to have obtained a master's in biochemistry from the University of Dhaka. He later earned his Ph.D. degree in agricultural chemistry from the University of London in 1938.

== Career ==
Ghani joined the University of Dhaka in India as a lecturer of soil science in 1940. During 1945–1949 he was an agricultural chemist of the Government of Bengal, British India and later Government of East Pakistan. He returned to the university in 1949 and became professor and head of the Department of Soil Science and also head of the Department of Geology.

Ghani served as the first vice-chancellor of the East Pakistan Agricultural University (later Bangladesh Agricultural University) during 1961–1963. He later served as the vice-Chancellor of the University of Dhaka during 1963–1970.

Ghani was elected a fellow of the Pakistan Academy of Sciences in 1954 and was elected the President of the Bangladesh Academy of Sciences in 1976.

Ghani was also elected a Member of the Bangladesh Parliament as an independent candidate in 1979.

== Awards and honors ==
- Sitara-e-Quaid-i-Azam (1958)
- Sitara-e-Pakistan (1964)
- Honorary DSc from Northern Colorado University (1967)
