= Choudhury Mahmood Hasan =

Bangladeshi phytochemist

Vice-chancellor of Manarat International University
- In office 13 October 2012 – 2016
- Succeeded by: Sirajuddaula Shaheen (acting)

Personal details
- Born: 31 August 1953 (age 72)
- Parent: Md. Abdul Quddus Choudhury (father)
- Education: University of Dhaka; University of Strathclyde

Choudhury Mahmood Hasan FRSC (born 31 August 1953) is a phytochemist and former Vice-chancellor for Manarat International University. His father was Late Justice Md. Abdul Quddus Choudhury. He received his Bachelor of Pharmacy and Master of Pharmacy from University of Dhaka in 1973 and 1974 respectively. Later he was awarded a Commonwealth Scholarship to attend the University of Strathclyde where he completed his PhD in 1982.

== Awards and honours ==
- Hakim Habibur Rahman Gold Medal; 2003, for outstanding contribution in the field of medicinal plants research.
- Bangladesh Academy of Sciences Gold Medal; 2006, in Biological Sciences (senior group) for significant contribution in the field of Plant Products Chemistry
- Chandrabati Gold Medal; 2007, for outstanding contribution in science.
- Atish Dipankar Gold Medal; 2008, for outstanding contribution in science.
