= Jamal Nazrul Islam =

Bangladeshi theoretical physicist and mathematician (1939-2013)

- জামাল নজরুল ইসলাম
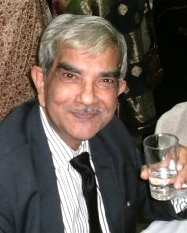
- Islam in 2010
- Born: 24 February 1939; Jhenaidah, Bengal Province, British India
- Died: 16 March 2013 (aged 74); Chittagong, Bangladesh
- Resting place: Garibullah Shah Mazar Graveyard
- Education: DSc (1982); PhD (1964); MSc (1960); BSc (1959)
- Alma mater: Chattogram Collegiate School; University of Cambridge; University of Calcutta
- Known for: The Ultimate Fate of the Universe; Classical General Relativity Proceedings of the Conference on Classical (Non-Quantum); General Relativity; Rotating Fields in General Relativity; Black hole theory Cosmology equation An Introduction to Mathematical Cosmology
- Children: 2
- Awards: full list
- Scientific career
- Fields: Theoretical physics Applied mathematics Mathematical physics Cosmology; General relativity Quantum field theory

Jamal Nazrul Islam FRAS (24 February 1939 – 16 March 2013) was a Bangladeshi mathematical physicist and cosmologist. He was a professor at University of Chittagong, served as a member of the advisory board at Shahjalal University of Science and Technology and member of the syndicate at Chittagong University of Engineering & Technology until his death. He also served as the director of the Research Center for Mathematical and Physical Sciences (RCMPS) at the University of Chittagong. He was posthumously awarded Independence Award, the highest civilian honour of the country, in 2025.

== Early life and education ==
Jamal Nazrul Islam was born on 24 February 1939 in Jhenaidah. His ancestral home is at Jujkhola Narayanhat of Fatikchhari Upazila of Chittagong District, East Bengal. His father, Khan Bahadur Sirajul Islam, was a sub-judge in British India. Because of his father's job, Islam spent his early school years in Calcutta. He studied at Chittagong Collegiate School and College until ninth grade and then he went to Lawrence College, Murree in West Pakistan to pass the Senior Cambridge and Higher Senior Cambridge exams. He received a BSc degree from St. Xavier's College at the University of Calcutta. In 1959, he got his Honors in Functional Mathematics and Theoretical Physics from Cambridge University. He completed his master's degree in 1960. As a student of the Trinity College, he finished the Mathematical Tripos. Islam obtained his PhD in applied mathematics and theoretical physics from Trinity College, Cambridge in 1968, followed by a DSc in 1982.

== Academic career ==
Islam worked in the Institute of Theoretical Astronomy (later amalgamated to Institute of Astronomy, Cambridge) from 1967 until 1971. Later he worked as a researcher in California Institute of Technology and University of Washington. During 1973–1974, he served as the faculty of Applied Mathematics of King's College London. In 1978, he then joined the faculty of City University London until he returned to Chittagong in 1984. In 2006, he was made Professor Emeritus at the University of Chittagong.

His research areas included applied mathematics, theoretical physics, mathematical physics, the theories of gravitation, general relativity, mathematical cosmology, and quantum field theory. Islam authored, coauthored or edited more than 50 scientific articles, books and some popular articles published in various scientific journals. Besides this he has also written books in Bengali. Particularly noteworthy are Black Hole, published by the Bangla Academy, "The Mother Tongue, Scientific Research and other Articles" and "Art, Literature and Society". The latter two are compilations.

In 1997, Islam was invited to the International Symposium on Mathematical Physics in memory of Subrahmanyan Chandrasekhar with a special session on Abdus Salam arranged by Calcutta Mathematical Society in Kolkata-India. Professor Narayan Chandra Ghosh, a mathematician of India, was director of the noted symposium.

== Fellowships ==
- Third World Academy of Science (1985)
- Cambridge Philosophical Society
- Royal Astronomical Society
- Bangladesh Academy of Sciences (1983)
- Islamic Academy of Sciences

== Personal life ==
Islam held a deep love for his homeland of Bangladesh, returning there after earning his PhD and DSc, after the 1971 independence war. He is said to have always advised people to return to their motherland after finishing their studies abroad.

He had a wife and two daughters, who survived his death. In his own time, he was known to be a singer, delighting in the songs of Rabindranath Tagore. Additionally, he was a student of Sufism and was also a social activist dedicated to the alleviation of poverty in Bangladesh.

== Death ==
Islam died on 16 March 2013 in Chittagong at the age of 74, having been admitted to the hospital two days prior with diabetes and other issues. Three funeral prayers were held for him, the first at Chittagong University mosque, the second at Shaheed Minar and the last near Garibullah Shah Mazar, where he was buried after the afternoon prayer.

== Awards ==
- Gold award from Bangladesh Academy of Sciences (Senior group; 1985)
- Medal Lecture award from Accademia Nazionale delle Scienze (1998)
- Bangladesh National Award for Science and Technology (1998)
- Ekushey Padak (2000)
- Razzak-Shamsun Lifetime Achievement Award in Physics from the University of Dhaka (2011)
- Independence Award (2025)

== Books authored/coauthored/edited ==
- Islam, J.N. (1983): The Ultimate Fate of the Universe. Cambridge University Press, Cambridge, England. ISBN 978-0-521-11312-0. (Digital print version published in 2009).
- Bonnor, W.B., Islam, J.N., MacCallum, M.A.H. (eds.)(1983): Classical General Relativity: Proceedings of the Conference on Classical (Non-Quantum) General Relativity, Cambridge University Press, Cambridge, England. ISBN 0-521-26747-1.
- Islam, J.N. (1985): Rotating Fields in General Relativity, Cambridge University Press, Cambridge, England. ISBN 978-0-521-11311-3. (Digital print version published in 2009).
- Islam, J.N. (1992, 2nd edition 2002): An Introduction to Mathematical Cosmology, Cambridge University Press, Cambridge, England. ISBN 0-521-49973-9.

== In media ==
- ‘বিগ ব্যাংয়ের আগে বলে আসলে কিছু নেই’ — জামাল নজরুল ইসলাম (in Bengali). Interview by Munir Hasan published in Biggan Chinta (26 February 2024).
