= A. A. Mamun =

Bangladeshi physicist

Abdullah Al Mamun
- Born: 31 December 1966 (age 59); Dhaka, East Pakistan, Pakistan
- Education: Jahangirnagar University; University of St Andrews
- Occupation: University professor

Abdullah Al Mamun (born 31 December 1966) is a Bangladeshi physicist who is a professor of physics at Jahangirnagar University, Dhaka, Bangladesh.

== Early life and education ==
A A Mamun (son of Darbesh Ali and Rizia Ali) was born in Dhamrai Upazila, Dhaka, East Pakistan (now Bangladesh) on 31 December 1966, and passed the Secondary School Certificate and Higher Secondary Certificate examinations, from Kushura Abbas Ali High School (Dhamrai Upazila, Dhaka) and Government Science College (Tejgaon Thana, Dhaka) in 1981 and 1983, respectively.

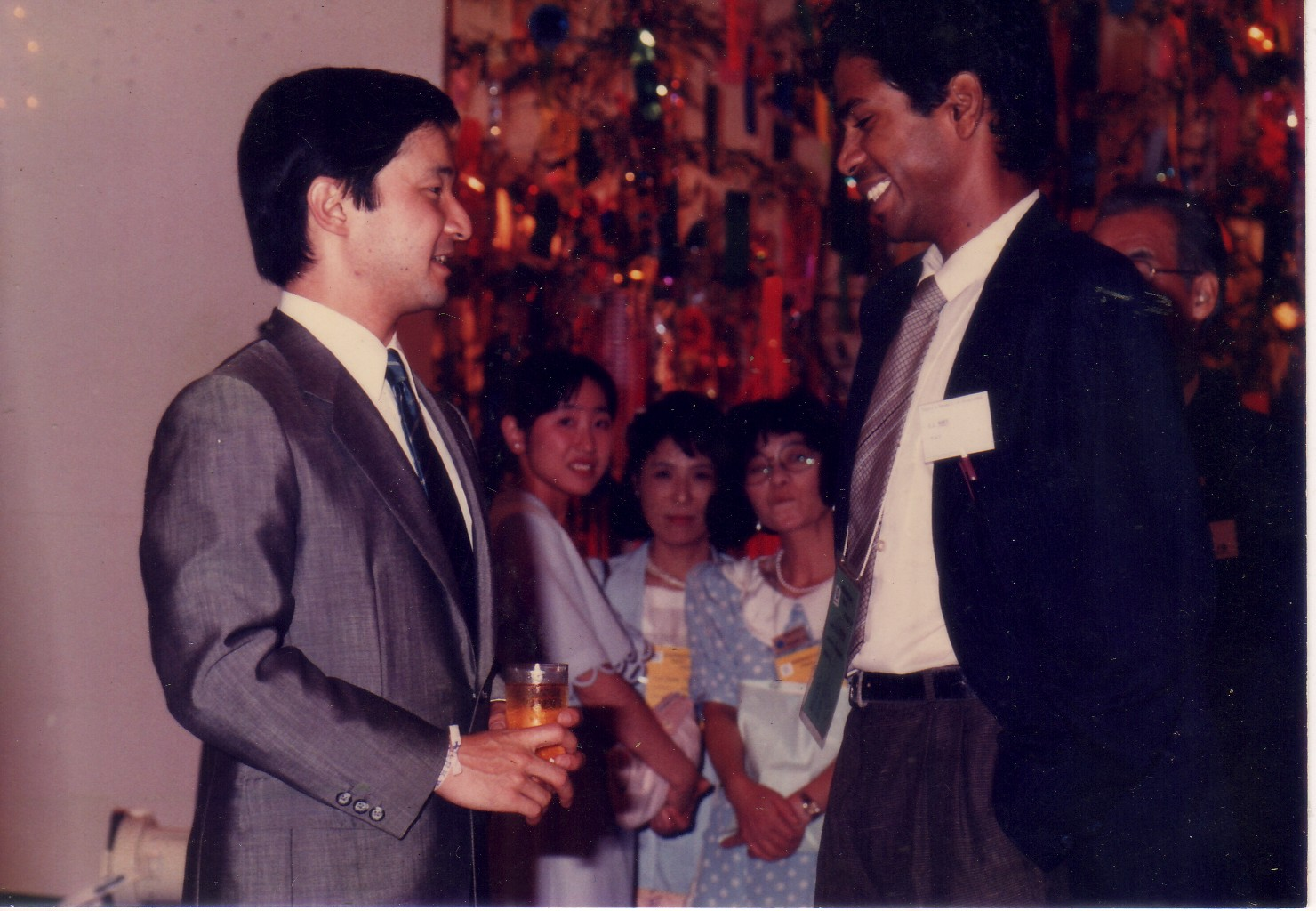
Mamun with Naruhito at "International Youth Village Program-1989" in Fukuoka, Japan.

Mamun attended Jahangirnagar University, and passed Bachelor of Science and Master of Science in physics in 1986 (held in 1989) and 1987 (held in 1991), respectively. On the basis of his extraordinary academic results, and performances in other activities at the university, Mamun was given an opportunity to represent Jahangirnagar University and Bangladesh in "International Youth Village Program 1989" held in Fukuoka, Japan, where he met with Naruhito, then crown prince of Japan.

Mamun gained a PhD in plasma physics at the University of St Andrews by a Commonwealth Scholarship under the Commonwealth Scholarship and Fellowship Plan. He then performed postdoctoral studies in Germany and Scotland on an Alexander von Humboldt postdoctoral research fellowship, and a Commonwealth postdoctoral research fellowship, respectively. As well as his faculty position at Jahangirnagar University, Mamun has a visiting position at the International Centre for Theoretical Physics in Trieste, Italy.

== Research contributions ==
Mamun has published over 400 research articles in peer-reviewed international journals. The Institute of Physics (London) published his textbook on dusty plasma physics.

According to a report published in PLOS Biology, Mamun is one of the top 2% [position:130 out of 43,218 (2%)] scientists (in the world) working in the fields of fluids and plasma, as well as top 2% [position: 28,781 out of 159,624 (2%)] scientists (in the world) working in all branches of sciences (including engineering and medical sciences).

== Awards and honours ==
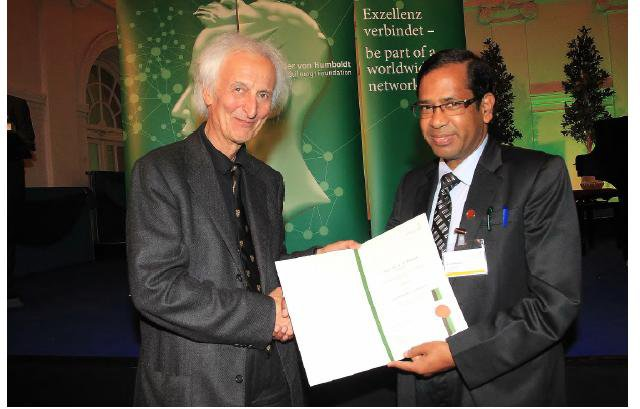
Mamun receiving the Friedrich Wilhelm Bessel Research Award from the president of the Alexander von Humboldt Foundation in 2009.

- Bangladesh Academy of Sciences (BAS) Gold Medal in Physical Sciences (Junior Group: 2004)
- Bangladesh Academy of Sciences (BAS) Gold Medal in Physical Sciences (Senior Group: 2011)
- Friedrich Wilhelm Bessel Research Award in 2009 from the Alexander von Humboldt Foundation
- The World Academy of Sciences (TWAS) Prize-2006 for young physicists (Trieste, Italy) in recognition of his great contribution in physics.
- University Grants Commission (Bangladesh) Award - 2008 in Physical & Mathematical Sciences.
- ITCPP (ICTP) Young Physicist Medal and Certificate - 2000 from the International Topical Conference on Plasma Physics (ITCPP), International Centre for Theoretical Physics (ICTP).
- Elected Fellow, The World Academy of Sciences, Trieste, Italy.
- Elected Fellow, The Bangladesh Academy of Sciences, Dhaka, Bangladesh.

Mamun has also been honored by a number of honorary appointments for his scientific contribution to physics. The important ones are as follows:

- Director of `Wazed Miah Science Research Centre' at Jahangirnagar University, Savar, Dhaka, Bangladesh.
- Members of the governing bodies of 'National Museum of Science and Technology' as well as 'Bangladesh National Scientific and Technical Documentation Centre'.
- Guest Editors of a special issue in Journal of Plasma Physics published by the Cambridge University Press, and of a special issue in Review of Modern Plasma Physics published by the Springer Nature (Japan).
- Associate Editor of the Journal: Review of Modern Plasma Physics published by Springer Nature (Japan).
- Editorial Board Member of the journal: Advances in Astrophysics published by Isaac Scientific Publishing (Hong Kong).
- Regular Associate of the International Centre for Theoretical Physics (Trieste, Italy) appointed twice (from 1 January 1998 to 31 December 2002, and from 1 January 2009 to 31 December 2013).
