= Mahmudur Rahman Choudhury =

- মাহমুদুর রহমান চৌধুরী
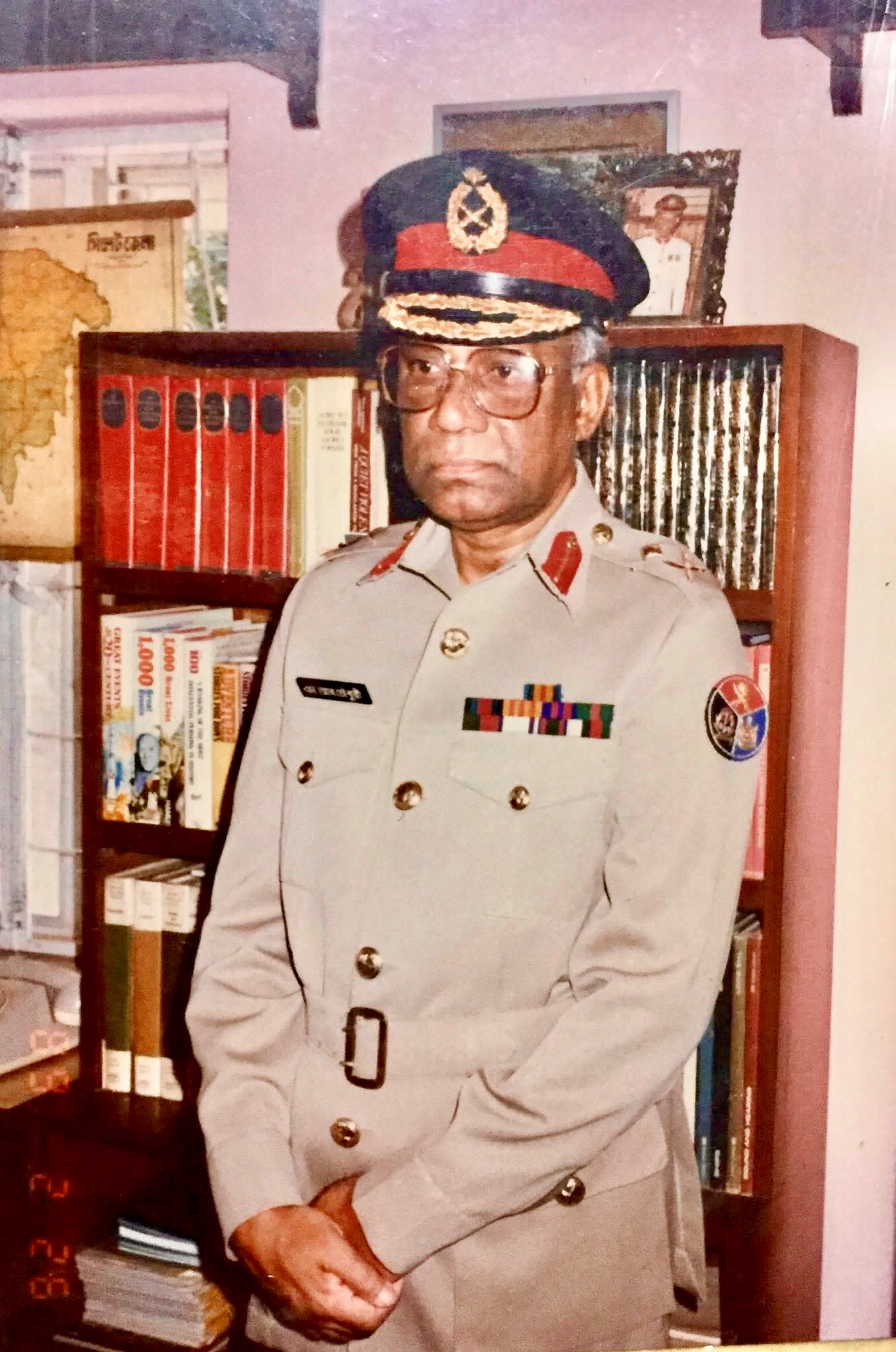
- Born: 1 June 1928; Sylhet, Assam, British India
- Died: 24 June 1999 (aged 71); Bangladesh Secretariat, Dhaka Division, Bangladesh
- Education: Calcutta Medical College; University of London
- Military career
- Allegiance: Pakistan (before 1972); Bangladesh
- Branch: Pakistan Army; Bangladesh Army
- Service years: 1952 – 1992
- Rank: Major General
- Unit: Army Medical Corps
- Commands: Commandant of Armed Forces Institute of Pathology, Bangladesh
- Awards: Independence Day Award; Tamgha-e-Quaid-e-Azam

Mahmudur Rahman Choudhury (1 June 1928 – 24 June 1999) also known as Major General MR Choudhury, was a medical scientist and physician from Bangladesh who was the founder commandant of the Armed Forces Institute of Pathology, Bangladesh. The government of Bangladesh awarded him the Independence Day Award, the highest civilian honor in the country, in 1977. The institution Choudhury built up, the Armed Forces Institute of Pathology, Bangladesh also received the same award as a center of excellence later in 1987.

== Early life and career ==
Born on 1 June 1928, in Sylhet, Choudhury graduated from Calcutta Medical College in 1951, and obtained D. Bact. degree with distinction from the University of London in 1959.

He was commissioned in the Pakistan Army Medical Corps in 1952. For his professional excellence as a junior major, Choudhury received a letter of commendation from the commander in chief and was honored with the civil award Tamgha-e-Quaide Azam. Choudhury was posted at Islamabad as the executive director of National Health Laboratories, now National Institute of Health, Islamabad in 1970.

After the independence of Bangladesh Choudhury played the key role in the establishment of Armed Forces Institute of Pathology, Bangladesh in 1976. He also organized the Bangladesh Society of Microbiologists the same year and was its founder president. He had the distinction of being awarded MRCPath without examination, and subsequently FRCPath by the Royal Society of Pathologists of United Kingdom. General Choudhury played a pivotal role in the internationalization of Icddr,b and served on its Board of Trustees until his passing. He was instrumental in founding the National AIDS Committee in Bangladesh in 1985, led national HIV/AIDS policy development, and chaired the committee from 1989 to 1992.

The monumental work of emeritus professor Choudhury was the publication of 'Modern Medical Microbiology (1980). The latest enlarged and revised version of the book was completed by the author just before his death. An analysis of the health sector of Bangladesh, which he conducted in 1987 and wrote along with Zafrullah Chowdhury (Gonosasthya Kendra) and Muhammad Yunus (Grameen Bank). Although the health policy report was approved by the government of Bangladesh, it was never published due to political reasons.
