= Arun Kumar Basak =

Bangladeshi physicist

- অরুন কুমার বসাক
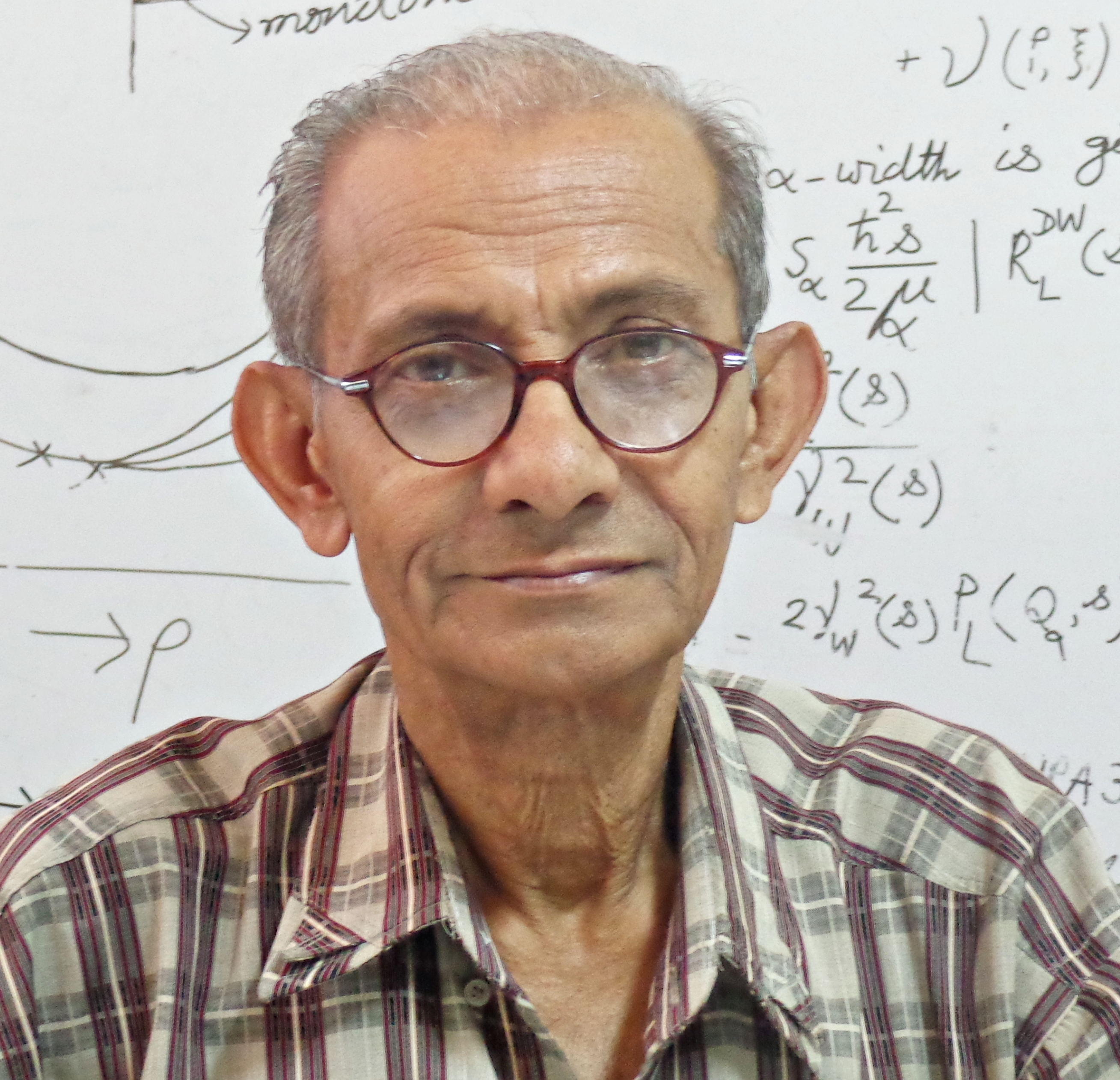
- Basak in 2012
- Born: October 17, 1941 (age 84); Pabna, Bengal Presidency, British India
- Education: University of Rajshahi; Rajshahi College; Birmingham University
- Scientific career
- Fields: Theoretical physics, Atomic physics, Nuclear Physics
- Workplaces: University of Rajshahi; Kent University; Shahjalal University of Science and Technology

Arun Kumar Basak FInstP CPhys (born October 17, 1941) is a Bangladeshi physicist. He is Professor Emeritus in the Department of Physics, University of Rajshahi.

== Early life and education ==
Basak was born in Radhanagor of Pabna town, Bengal Presidency, British India to parents Haripada Basak and Usha Rani Basak. Basak matriculated in 1957 securing First Division from R.M. Academy. He secured the second position in the merit list in the Intermediate Science Examination in 1959 from Govt. Edward College. He was placed in First Class with the first position in the B.Sc. (Hons) examination from Rajshahi College in 1961. In M.Sc. Examination (1963) from the University of Rajshahi, he obtained the first position in first class and was awarded an RU Gold medal.

== Career ==
In December 1963, Basak joined the University of Rajshahi as a lecturer in the Department of Physics. In 1978, Basak was appointed as an associate professor by the University of Dhaka, but he preferred to stay in Rajshahi where he became associate professor in the later part of 1978. He was awarded a merit scholarship for securing the highest marks in the Faculty of Science and got admission at Imperial College, London. Owing to the 1965 Indo-Pak war, he could not avail the opportunity. In 1972, he went to the University of Birmingham with a Commonwealth Scholarship. He worked with the tensor polarized deuteron and the polarized ^{3}He beams, the latter being the only one of its kind in the world. He earned his Ph.D. degree in 1975.

=== Professional membership ===
1. Senior associate of the International Centre for Theoretical Physics at Trieste, Italy during 1987–96.
2. Elected as a fellow of the Bangladesh Academy of Sciences in 2001
3. Elected as a fellow of the Institute of Physics (London) in 2001.
4. Was a principal investigator from Bangladesh in a collaborative project, which funded by the US National Science Foundation.
5. The fellow of Bangladesh Physical Society from 1987 (life membership).
6. A member of American Physical Society during 2000-03 and from 2013(life membership).

=== Others ===
- Was a post doctoral fellow in nuclear physics, the Ohio State University, United States during 1981–82.
- An associate member of ICTP, Italy during 1988–1995.
- Visiting scholar at Southern Illinois University, US in 1997.
- Visiting professor at Kent State University, US.

== Awards ==
- Bangladesh Academy of Sciences Gold Medal in Physical Sciences (2003)
- Star Lifetime Award on Physics (2016)
- The Daily Star Award
