= Fazley Bary Malik =

Bangladeshi physicist (1934–2014)

- Born: 16 August 1934
- Died: 4 July 2014 (aged 79); Istanbul, Turkey
- Resting place: Banani, Dhaka, Bangladesh
- Education: Calcutta University; University of Dhaka; University of Göttingen
- Scientific career
- Fields: Theoretical physics
- Workplaces: Indiana University Bloomington; Southern Illinois University Carbondale
- Doctoral advisor: Werner Heisenberg

Fazley Bary Malik (August 16, 1934 - July 4, 2014) was a Bangladeshi physicist. He was a professor of theoretical nuclear and atomic physics at Southern Illinois University Carbondale from 1980 until 2014.

He was a Fellow of Bangladesh Academy of Sciences. He was awarded John Wheatley Award by American Physical Society in 2007.

== Education ==
Malik completed his bachelor's from Calcutta University in 1953 and master's from the University of Dhaka in 1955. He obtained his Ph.D. from the University of Göttingen in 1958 under the supervision of Nobel Laureate professor Werner Heisenberg. He was a post-doctoral fellow at the Princeton University during 1960–63.

== Career ==
Malik started his career as an assistant professor at the Yale University (1964–68). He then served as a professor at Indiana University Bloomington (1968–82). He then worked as a research professor at Southern Illinois University Carbondale until 2015.

Malik served either as a consultant or visiting scholar or professor at Lawrence Berkeley National Laboratory, Oak Ridge National Laboratory, Saclay Nuclear Research Centre, Kapitza Institute, CERN, International Centre for Theoretical Physics, NASA and the universities in Germany, Switzerland, Sweden, Finland, Hungary, China and Australia.

== Awards and honors ==
- Max Planck Societies Senior Fellow (1976 - 1977)
- Fulbright Scholar (1987)
- Outstanding Scholar of SIUC (1996)
- NASA/ASEE Summer Fellow (1992, 1993)
- Fellow of Bangladesh Academy of Sciences (since 2002)
- John Wheatley Award (2007)

== Personal life ==
Malik married Akemi Oikawa and had one child, Akira.

On July 4, 2014, Malik died in Istanbul Airport in Turkey on his way from Bangladesh to the United States. He was buried on July 7 in Banani, Dhaka, Bangladesh.
