= Bangladeshi heavy metal =

Music scene

- Other names: Bangla heavy metal
- Stylistic origins: Heavy metal; NWOBHM; Neoclassical metal; Hard rock; Psychedelic rock; Blues rock
- Cultural origins: Mid- to late 1980s, Dhaka, Bangladesh
- Typical instruments: Electric guitar; Vocals; Bass; Drums; Keyboards (occasionally)

Regional scenes
- Dhaka, Bangladesh

Other topics
- Heavy metal music; New wave of British heavy metal; Music of Bangladesh; Bangladeshi rock

Bangladeshi heavy metal or Bangla heavy metal was originated from the evolution of British and American heavy metal bands of the 1980s. Bands like Iron Maiden, Metallica and Megadeth have had the greatest influences on Bangladeshi heavy metal musicians. Other 1970s bands to influence are bands like Deep Purple, Black Sabbath and Motörhead. The first bands to play heavy metal in Bangladesh were bands like Warfaze and Rockstrata. The most prominent era for heavy metal movement was between the early 1990s to early 2000s. Warfaze, Rockstrata, Aces and in Dhaka are often considered as the "big four founders of heavy metal". Other 2000s metal bands are bands like Artcell, Aurthohin, Cryptic Fate, Powersurge, Mechanix, Metal Maze, Vibe and Stentorian. Alternative bands like Nemesis, Arbovirus and Black also played some alternative metal songs over the years. Warfaze, Artcell and Aurthohin together are the most popular rock/metal trio of Bangladesh.

== History ==
=== 1960s and 1970s (Pre-history) ===
==== Antecedents: 1960s (Blues rock) ====
Although there were no Bangladeshi metal bands formed in the 1960s and 1970s, some blues-based rock bands helped to emerge heavy rock in Bangladesh. Such a band was Windy Side of Care, formed in 1964, Dhaka, who became one of the earliest rock bands to form in Bangladesh. Mainly inspired by rock n' roll artists like Elvis Presley, Cliff Richard and The Shadows, they mixed psychedelic rock, hard rock, blues rock with Bengali Classical music. Initially they did not intend to record their output but to play gigs. They used to jam at Shahbag Hotel. They jammed at high volume, so loud that they were told to turn down their volume by their grandfather. Their long instrumental jamming through high amps, powerful distortion and frequent whammy bar sets an early example of heavy rock in the Bangladeshi music scene. They did not become commercially successful but their early works and experiments indicate the major movement of heavy rock in Bangladesh. Although they are not as well known to modern fans, some of their records were recovered. They made a deal with EMI record labels to record an album in 1968.

==== Heavy rock influence: Mid to late '70s ====
Later in the 1970s, many pop rock and psychedelic rock bands were formed in Bangladesh. Although most of them did not play or contribute much to heavy metal but some bands like Miles, Feedback and Feelings played some hard rock songs in their concerts drawn from psychedelic and blues rock. Miles, despite being a pop rock and blues rock band, used to play few hard rock songs in their live concerts, around the early 1980s. James from Feelings (now known as Nogor Baul) was a pioneering psychedelic rock artist of Bangladesh. He too performed heavy rock riffs and solos. Late Ayub Bachchu was a member of the pop rock band, Souls, who later formed his own band, LRB. Ayub Bachchu, too, came forward with his technical guitar playing by following the bluesy styles, which also helped emerging heavy rock in Bangladesh.

=== 1980s and 1990s (Origins) ===
==== Foundation: 1980–1993 ====
The 1980s was the most important decade for the foundation of heavy metal in Bangladesh. Heavy metal and hard rock became very popular among young music fans. The young musicians picked up their instruments and started to cover hard rock and heavy metal songs. They also followed the styles of English and American metal bands styles – growing long hair, forming bands with English names, wearing tight jeans, t-shirts, boots, etc. However, due to cultural impact and strictness, many boys were not allowed to grow long hair until they became famous.

Back in the 1980s, there was no Internet connection or many broadcasting facilities in Bangladesh for foreign heavy metal bands, but there was also a local shop called "Rainbow", in Dhaka, which used to distribute foreign metal bands' albums. The shop played an important role in inspiring Bangladeshi musicians with foreign metal acts. The shop is still active.

Primarily drawing influences from NWOBHM bands such as Iron Maiden and Motörhead with an early influence of the 1970s traditional heavy metal bands such as Deep Purple and Black Sabbath, many underground hard rock and heavy metal bands were formed in Dhaka from early to mid-1980s. It was an immediate response to New wave of British heavy metal music from Bangladeshi musicians. Many psychedelic rock and blues rock artists of Bangladesh also inspired them to go forward. While some young guitarists at that time were also impressed by the guitar playing of neoclassical metal artists such as Ritchie Blackmore, Randy Rhoads, Yngwie Malmsteen, Jason Becker and Paul Gilbert.

The first ever Bangladeshi heavy metal band to be formed was "Waves" on 25 December 1981, Frankfurt, Germany. The band was formed by three Bangladeshi teenagers - Iftekhar, Mahmud and Mithu living in Germany. Their early influences include hard rock and metal bands like AC/DC, Black Sabbath, Led Zeppelin, Motorhead, Thin Lizzy and Van Halen. They returned to Bangladesh in 1983. In 1984, Waves recorded three songs for BTV for its upcoming Eid show but BTVs GM called the entire show an Opo-Shankscrity and decided not to air Waves. Following that incident, Waves was banned from performing at venues in Bangladesh including BTV. Many line-up changes happened while some of the members moved abroad. They covered "Heaven and Hell by Black Sabbath in 1985. Video footage can be found on YouTube about their lead singer asking their audiences if it was right banning Waves from performing on BTV and if they (the audience) would want to cut Iftekhar's (their bassist) long hair. Waves disbanded in 1985 and after almost ten years they released their only album, Purono Smriti. They have been inactive since 1996.

In 1984, Warfaze was formed. They were young heavy metal fans from St. Joseph Higher Secondary School. At the time heavy metal was not yet mainstream music in Bangladesh. Mainstream music included genres such as pop, folk and blues. So, Warfaze started as a cover band. They used to cover hard rock and heavy metal songs by bands such as Deep Purple, Iron Maiden and Dokken. After multiple line-up changes and 7 years since their formation, they released their self-titled debut album, "Warfaze", in 1991 under Sargam records. The album is considered one of the most influential heavy metal albums of Bangladesh. Songs like "Boshe Achi" and "Ekti Chele" were big hits. Warfaze continued working on their following albums – Obak Valobasha, Jibon Dhara and Oshamajik in the '90s. Although at the time, there were few bands who played heavy riffs and solos, but there were no bands who had a singer like Warfaze's first singer, Sunjoy. Most of the metal/hard rock bands' vocalists employed melodic vocals with heavy riffs. But Sunjoy's powerful high-pitched screaming voice helped develop the idea of heavy metal singing. He was inspired by and often followed the singing style of Ian Gillan. His screams in "Ekti Chele", which last for about 20 seconds are a perfect example of this style. Sunjoy has been the most influential heavy metal vocalist of Bangladesh. On the other hand, Warfaze's lead guitarist, Kamal's fast arpeggios with alternate and sweep picking, tapping, dive bombs and melodic structures uses created heavy metal riffs and solos in their songs. Kamal is one of the pioneering shredders of Bangladesh. His shredding solos took Warfaze's music to a neoclassical metal edge. Warfaze along with their music also helped to improve rebellious lyrics in Bangladeshi Rock music. Most of their songs were about anti-establishment, complicated lives and socialism. Both of their albums, Jibon Dhara (Living Style) and Oshamajik (Anti-Social) demonstrate this. While Jibon Dhara was more focused on a political theme, Oshamajik was more interested in social struggles. Their lyrics helped push the boundary of romantic lyrics. Warfaze has been the most important rock and metal band of Bangladesh for their influence and consistency, running for over three decades and still going.

Rockstrata, another metal band was formed in 1985. They too were students of St. Joseph Higher Secondary School. They were initially inspired by Black Sabbath. They used to cover various songs of Black Sabbath. Later they gained interest in Iron Maiden. They released their self-titled debut album in 1992. Their music, especially guitar riffs were heavier compared to other rock bands of their time. But after releasing their debut album, they stayed dormant for over 20 years. Although they returned to the scene with their second album, Notun Shaader Khoje (In Search of New Taste) in 2014. Both Rockstrata and Warfaze have been cited as the first heavy metal bands of Bangladesh by music critics. However both being contemporaries to each other, Warfaze and Rockstrata had significant differences in their musical styles. Rockstrata sounded more brutal and heavy which could be compared to doom metal music of Black Sabbath. While Warfaze approached more as a technical and fast-paced band similar to the speed metal sound of Deep Purple.

In Dhaka, another band formed in the late 80s to early 90s, was also influential to hard rock and heavy metal. They released their debut album Nishshobdo Kolahol in 1992. But they too became inactive after mid 90s. Meanwhile, another hard rock trio named Kirtinasha (Destroyed) who formed in 1988, released their debut album, Kirtinasha in 1993 under Asia Voice records. Kirtinasha was one of the few bands who did not release their albums under Sargam label. They were one of the pioneering hard rock bands of Bangladesh who recorded some of their earliest material in 1988 but did not release anything until their debut album. Kirtinasha's songs were about natural calamities, anti-love, conflicts, narcissism, terrorism and deaths. Kirtinasha never went mainstream like Warfaze or Rockstrata. But their song "Dhoroni" (Earth) was successful among hard rock fans of that time. Kirtinasha had no activity after the mid-1990s. Their members pursued their personal lives and left the music industry after the mid-1990s. Aces was another popular rock band formed in the late 1980s. They were very technically proficient but did not release any albums. Thus they faded from the music scene after the 1990s.

==== Emergence: 1994–1999 ====
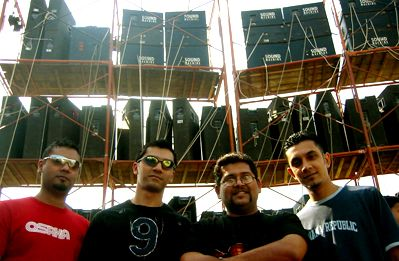
Cryptic Fate was one of the leading metal bands to next-generation heavy metal of Bangladesh from the mid-1990s to early 2000s.

Followed by the groundbreaking success of Warfaze and Rockstrata, several heavy metal and hard rock bands were formed between the mid to late 1990s. Bands such as Artcell, Cryptic Fate, Aurthohin and Vikings were the main ones. Ever since then they have been playing important roles for developing different heavy metal genres in Bangladesh. Cryptic Fate is a prime example of this. They formed in 1993 and released their debut album, Ends Are Forever, in 1994 which was written in English. Ends Are Forever was the first ever English-language metal album recorded by a Bangladeshi artist. Cryptic Fate was the second most important metal band in Bangladesh. They were one of the leading bands of next generation Bangladeshi heavy metal music. They started to write in Bengali in their later albums. Although they started as a traditional heavy metal band, their next albums included more complex guitar solos and drumming. Thus their songs became very influential towards development of progressive metal in Bangladesh. Their songs often contained fast-tempoed heavy riffs and deep vocals which bordered on progressive death metal. Cryptic Fate often wrote lyrics about the Liberation War of Bangladesh. Cryptic Fate is the longest most active metal band after Warfaze. There have been some important metal bands from early to late 1990s, who were popular during that time but did not go mainstream or did not remain active. Bands like these include – Legend, Psychodeth, Trashold, Phantom Lord, Metal Warriors etc. Gibran Tanwir formed Deth Row, in 1991, which did its first show in 1994 and was a huge part of underground metal scene. Gibran had a band called Glad Tiders with Sohel and drummer Daiyan Mir. Psychodeth, another metal band formed in the early 1990s, and performed in many shows together. Thrashold was formed by Zia of Shironamhin in 1992. Zia was a teenager at the time. The band played only a few live concerts. Zia later approached his career as a folk and alternative rock musician.

=== 2000s and 2010s (Mainstream) ===
==== Development of subgenres: 2000–2010 ====
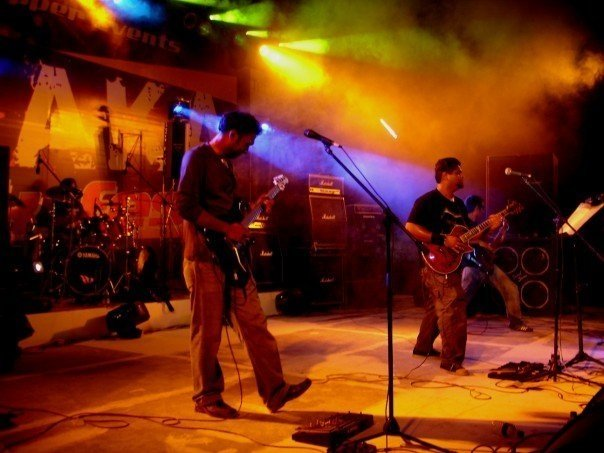
Artcell, a progressive metal band formed in 1999. They released their debut album Onno Shomoy in 2002 and Oniket Prantor in 2006. Both of their albums were big hits for their melodic vocals and acoustic riffs along with musical complexity.

In the 2000s heavy metal started to become mainstream in the Bangladeshi music scene. Thrash metal bands like Metallica and Megadeth had directly influenced young Bangladeshi musicians. As a result, the thrashier tone had become more common in Bangladeshi metal bands. The groove metal sound also became common among musicians. Primarily inspired by English and American thrash and groove metal bands with ground breaking success of Bangladeshi metal bands in the 1990s, many underground bands were formed in the early 2000s. By the beginning of the 2000s, Aurthohin released their debut album, as did Trimatrik in 2000. After that they constantly released their albums the next years, 2001, 2002 and 2003. They have been one of the most important bands for laying out different genres of heavy metal in Bangladesh. Aurthohin's leader, Sumon used to arrange different types of musical instruments to experiment with genres. He featured growling along with screaming in his songs. Singers such as Imtiaz and Rafa were invited to work for his albums. They backed up Sumon for growling and screaming when Sumon was unable to sing in a metal voice. Some of their most notable growls in songs include "Guti-From Hell", "Shaat Din" (Seven Days) and "Protirup" (Replica). Meanwhile, their first lead guitarist, Piklu, developed his guitar skills. He became proficient on various fast-scales with different types of picking techniques. He then started to play various genres such as heavy metal, thrash metal, speed metal, groove metal etc. Piklu was one of the most important metal guitarists in the history of Bangladeshi metal. Piklu is often considered as the first guitarist to play fast-paced heavy metal riffs. Piklu's fast-paced guitar riffs and solos helped bring the extreme metal tone in Aurthohin's songs. Several extreme metal guitarists were inspired by Piklu's guitar playing. Aurthohin's song, "Shaat Din" from Notun Diner Michile spanned for 28 minutes and 31 seconds, being the longest track ever recorded by a Bangladeshi rock artist. "Shaat Din" features various music arrangements, eleven guitar solos (all played by Piklu), several bass solos (all done by Sumon) and brutal growling as well as melodic vocals, piano rhythms and violin solos, became a good example of progressive metal. Sumon's slap bassing also helped to create the funky sound for the band, incorporating genres like funk rock and funk metal. Aurthohin due to Sumon's illness stopped their activities after 2003. But when Sumon started to recover from his illness, they continued their work from 2008. Vikings, another award-winning band of the 1990s released their debut album, "Jiboner Kolahol" in 2000. They featured heavy riffs in their songs. Their songs also featured massive whammy bar and pedal uses. Although they soon became inactive for over a decade but returned to scene with their movie soundtrack. Meanwhile, Artcell, another promising band formed in 1999, released their debut album 2002 and became Bangladesh's most popular progressive metal band. Their main inspiration was Metallica. They used to cover various songs by Metallica in their early years. Warfaze also inspired them as a Bangladeshi metal band. They released their second album, Oniket Prantor in 2006. They have had their biggest hits due to their catchy riffs and vocals. Two of their most famous songs, "Poth Chola" and "Oniket Prantor" both featured catchy acoustic plucking which helped make their music go mainstream even among non-metal fans. On the other hand, Lincoln, their lead singer's melodic vocal skills attracted many fans to their songs. Artcell has been one of the most technically proficient bands from Bangladesh. Their drummer, Shaju's fast and technical drum solos set a new example in Bangladesh. Shaju is often considered as the greatest and most technical drummer from Bangladesh. Some notable examples of his notable drumming feature on – "Oniker Prantor", "Dukhkhyo Bilash", "Poth Chola" etc. On the other hand, Ershad's technical guitar solos made their songs even more complex. Artcell's songs, combined with soft melody and complexity, helped make progressive metal go mainstream. Artcell also wrote some of the most complex lyrics in history of Bangladeshi rock music. Their primary lyricist was Rupok, but after his death, Ruman Ahmed wrote songs for them. During the mid-2000s, a music show program called, Rock Link, hosted by Bassbaba Sumon and Jewel, used to promote several rock bands of Bangladesh. The show promoted many metal bands too. After the mid-2000s several extreme metal bands were formed. Dripping Gore being the first death metal band in Bangladesh released their first single in a mixed Album called Agontuk – 3 in 2005. However the band went to a never-ending hibernation in 2006 when the frontman and Vocal Anjan went to Australia for his studies. Severe Dementia, being one of the renowned death metal band in Bangladesh, was formed in 2004. Severe Dementia was originally named "666", but due to cultural impact, it was renamed to Severe Dementia. Severe Dementia did not release any full-length albums, but did release an EP album, Epitaph of Plasse under Indian record label Demonstealer Records. Their music included blast-drum beats, fast-paced guitar riffs, guttural growls and screams. Their lyrics also were about ancient historical events and brutality. Powersurge was formed in 2006 as a thrash metal band. In 2006, De-illumination was formed. Sazzad Arefeen with help of Shams Mansoor Gani (keyboardist from Warfaze) experimented with classical and symphonic music. Sham's background keyboards helped steer the music towards Symphonic Metal. Thus it led their becoming the first symphonic metal band from Bangladesh. They released only one album in 2010. Sazzad Arefeen also reformed his own side project, Sazzad Arefeen's Angry Machine and continued his work there. Hallucination is considered to be the pioneer of Bengali melodic death metal. Formed in the year 2010 Hallucination has released one single and one studio album Krittrim Prithibi (2013). The album was released digitally in Bangladesh by Incursion Music in 2013. They are the first ones in the music industry to introduce the bkash way of buying an album and they are also the first band to release a Bengali album on compact disc in Oceania (Satanica Productions Australasia). Their first album Krittrim Prithibi (2013) is the benchmark for Bengali melodic death metal.

==== Fusion genres and experiments: 2010 and onwards ====
At the end of the 2010s many alternative rock bands were formed. However, they too played some heavy metal songs. Bands such as Nemesis, Black and Arbovirus have been the most notable ones. Arbovirus, despite having very few elements of metal in their songs, gained much popularity for their alternative and nu-metal musical styles. They are seen as a metal band by general music fans of Bangladesh. While, Nemesis often featured heavy solos and riffs which helped the emergence of alternative metal in Bangladesh. Bands like Funeral Anthem, Minerva and Hallucination also continued to make new extreme metal albums, but not all of them became successful. Combining the spirits of melodic structures with speed metal, Funeral Anthem became one of the pioneering power metal band of Bangladesh. In 2013, Minerva released their debut album, Biday Shongbidhan (Farewell Constitution). The album contained deep growling voice with groovy riffs and solos. Although not the first groove metal band, Minerva earned popularity in the genre. In 2015 they held a tribute concert for Bangladeshi rock artists – Azam Khan, Nogor Baul, LRB, Mile, Warfaze, Aurthohin, Cryptic Fate, Artcell, Black, Nemesis, Arbovirus, Powersurge and Mechanix. Hallucination is another notable band, which was formed in 2010, Dhaka. Hallucination played melodic death metal songs with heavy metal elements. They released their full-length debut album, Krittrim Prithibi in 2013 and they are considered the pioneerineering melodic death metal act in Bangladesh. Bay of Bengal, another band form Chittagong was formed in 2016. They released only one album in 2016. Their influences include, Megadeth, Pantera, Eluveitie etc. They combined folk and classical elements with heavy metal. According to their official Facebook page, they identified themselves as an experimental metal band. Their music feature flute solos, which often sound like Eluveitie. Bay of Bengal gained success from publishing their music videos on YouTube. One of their music videos was created to raise awareness about suicide. Their lead singer Bakhtiyar said on the matter,

The subject of the song is universal. I won't dedicate this song to anyone in particular. But I hope people will know better after watching the video and will hopefully refrain from committing suicide when they are in severe depression. Moreover, we should always be communicative and be supportive towards our loved ones'

There have been some solo acts by musicians too. Oni Hasan is a prominent Bangladeshi guitarist. He was initially the guitarist of band, Vibe. Later he joined Warfaze in 2008 in absence of Kamal. Oni Hasan worked on the albums – Pothchola and Shotto. He showed some extraordinary guitar skills. His influences include Dimebag Darrell, Jason Becker, Marty Friedman, etc. Although Kamal started the neoclassical metal act by playing technical solos on Warfaze's songs since the beginning, but Oni helped take it further. After leaving Warfaze in 2014, Oni worked as solo artist. He released some instrumental tracks with other musicians. Most of his songs included shredding and jamming. Oni is currently living in the UK for his study. He became popular internationally. Oni Hasan was endorsed by Carvin guitars.

==== Underground metal bands ====
Over the years there have been significant underground metal bands who did not go mainstream. Most of these metal bands were either black metal or bands having satanic lyrics. Satanik a black metal band (later performing technical brutal black metal) was formed in the early 2000s, almost never went mainstream due to their Satanic themes. Although in their interview they denied being a devil or Satan-promoting band. Their lead guitarist Nayeem said,

Satanik does not mean encouraging the devilish nature. In fact, it means to take off the masks and shout out loud and clear about the hidden evils prevalent in human beings. Everything comes in pairs, so do good and evil. Through our music, we want to address such evils to our listeners.

Other bands include, Barzak, Bloodlust, orator, Nafarmaan and Poizon Green. Poizon Green had initial success but only among hardcore metal fans.

Apart from controversial bands, there have been many metal bands who did not go mainstream and remained underground bands. Bands such as Scarecrow, Metal Maze, and Exenemy are some notable examples. Musicians like Rafa and Jewel played important roles for development of underground metal bands. Many compilation albums have been released throughout the years for promoting underground metal bands. Popular underground mix albums are – Lokayoto, Agontuk 1 and 2, Underground 1 and 2, and Republic. Although these albums were recorded with the intention of promoting underground metal bands, many popular rock and metal bands like Aurthohin, Black, Arbovirus, Artcell also played on those albums. Underground 1, composed by Kamal, was a big hit.

== International popularity of Bangladeshi metal bands ==
Although most Bangladeshi metal bands are not listened worldwide due to the Bengali language. However, due to some international ranking websites, some bands have come to be recognised internationally. For example, Warfaze was ranked 5th in "Best Hard Rock Bands" on TheTopTens. Sometimes they pushed even further and ranked 4th, surpassing classic hard rock bands like Aerosmith, Queen, Bon Jovi and Van Halen. Their current drummer and leader Tipu said on the matter,

It was unbelievable for us when we heard the news. However, it is true that we are in the top ten list in the music category. The feeling can't be described in words. When we can see popular bands are breaking down, we are still a team and rocking the world.

Five metal bands, Ionic Bond, Karmna, Trainwreck, Infidel and Torture GoreGrinder were selected for participating WOA metal battle. Artcell was also ranked as number 1 as best Asian hard rock/metal band on TheTopTens, surpassing bands like Boris and X-Japan. Warfaze was raked 4th on the list. Bassbaba Sumon, was also ranked as number 1 on "Best Slap Bassists" list, eclipsing bassists like Les Claypool, Victor Wooten and Flea. Although most of these Bangladeshi artists were added by Bangladeshi music fans, they became well known and were praised by many foreign music fans.

== Current status of Bangladeshi heavy metal ==
Even though heavy metal in Bangladesh was very popular from the late 1990s to the early 2000s, recent events and analysis show that the popularity of heavy metal is decreasing. Many soft rock and alternative rock bands are taking the place of heavy metal. Bands like Shunno, Old School, Lalon and Recall came forward in the media and airwaves. As a result, newly formed metal bands are not getting enough recognition or becoming mainstream. Foreign music scenes, especially music from India – Bollywood music and hip-hop music are dominating radio and television. Most radio channels and televisions stations are only interested in broadcasting soft music and pop. Only few hit metal songs are played sometimes. There are few broadcasting facilities for newly formed metal bands.

== Important record labels ==
Although most record labels are now interested in recording metal albums, this was not the case in the 1990s. Sargam was the first record label to record a heavy metal album. Sargam made it possible for metal artists to gain a foothold in the industry. Sargam was interested in recording various genres of albums. Many major metal bands – Warfaze, Rockstrata, In Dhaka and Aces were signed by Sargam. Sargam signed a deal with Rockstrata with 30k tk to record their debut album, Rockstrata. A mixed album called Hooray was huge inspiration for metal bands of today and was a significant movement for Bangladeshi heavy metal.

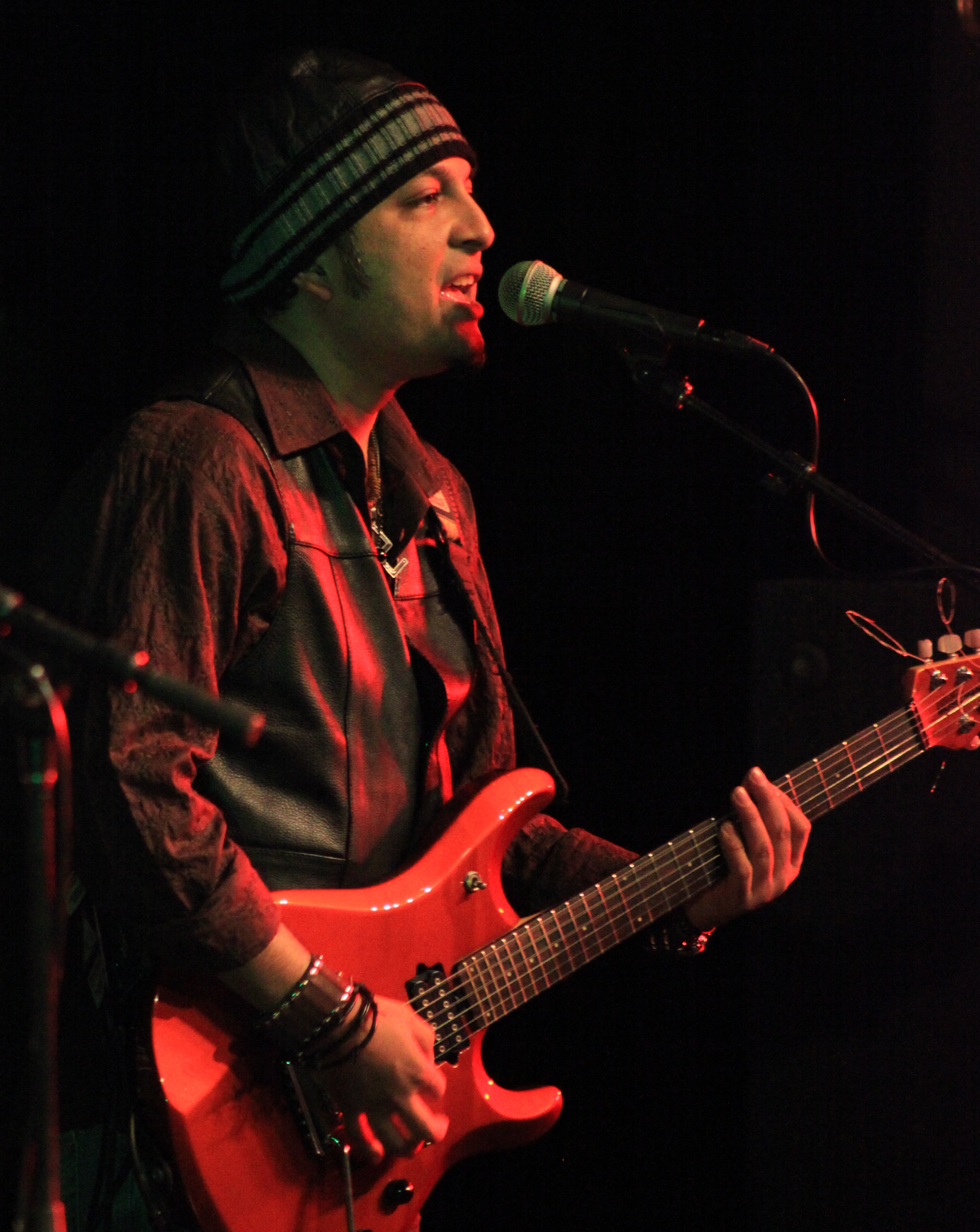
Iqbal Asif Jewel has produced and composed several metal artists' albums including most of Aurthohin's albums and Artcell's second album, Oniket Prantor. He was a guitarist/vocalist for Warfaze on their album Oshamajik.

After Sargam, other record labels like G-Series, Ektaar Music Ltd, Soundtek, Deadline Music and Incursion Music have recorded a number of metal albums throughout the 1990s, 2000s and 2010s. G-Series is the most important record label of Bangladesh after Sargam. Almost all notable metal bands are signed with G-Series.
