= Music of Bangladesh =

The music of Bangladesh spans a wide variety of styles. Historically, Bangladeshi music has served the purpose of documenting the lives of the people and was widely patronized by the rulers. It comprises a long tradition of religious and secular song-writing over a period of almost a millennium.

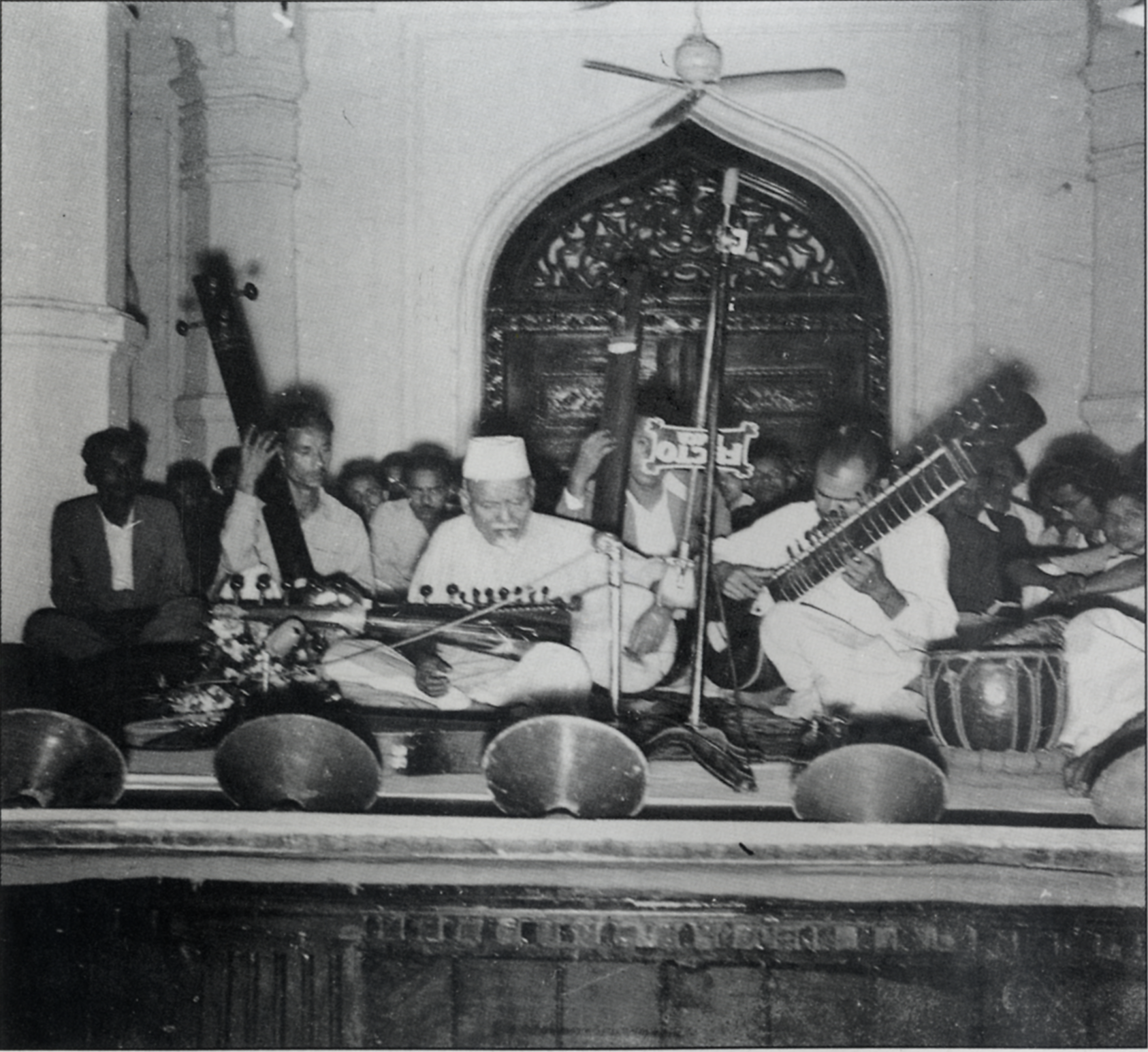
Ustad Alauddin Khan (centre), one of the greatest maestros of South Asian classical music, performing with his ensemble at Curzon Hall in Dhaka, 1955

== Classical music ==
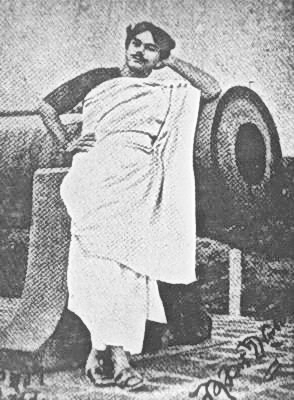
Nazrul sangeet origins from the works of Kazi Nazrul Islam

=== Ragapradhan Gaan ===
Bangladeshi classical music is based on modes called ragas. In composing these songs, the melodies of north Indian dingading ragas are used. As far as the Charyagiti (9th century), ragas have been used in Bengali music. Jaydev’s Gitagovindam, Padavali Kirtan, Mangal Giti, Shyamasangit, Tappa, Brahma Sangeet and Tagore songs have been inspired by Ragas. The use of north Indian ragas in Bangla songs began in 18th century. This trend gathered momentum during the 19th and 20th centuries. The pioneers of these trend were Ramnidhi Gupta, Kali Mirza, Raghunath Roy and the founder of the Bishnupur Gharana, Ramshanker Bhattacharya. Nawab of Lakhnau, Wajid Ali Shah played an important role in this trend. He was dethroned by the British Empire in 1856 and banished to Metiaburuz, Kolkata. During his 30-year exile, he patronized music, specially dhrupad, tappa, thumri and kheyal. And, thus made a lasting impact on Bangladeshi music. All traditional Bengali music tend to be based on various variations of Hindustani Classical Music. Rabindranath Tagore had a deep appreciation for north Indian ragas, successfully introduced ragas in his songs. He was followed by Dwijendralal Roy, Rajanikanta Sen and Atulprasad Sen.

== Folk music ==
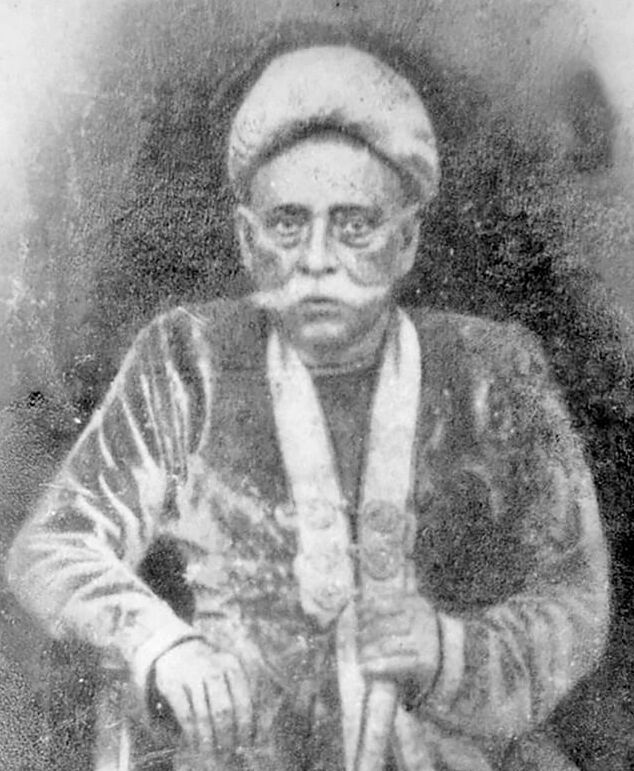
Painting depicting Hason Raja.

Folk has come to occupy the lives of Bangladeshis almost more than any other genre of Bengali music. Among the luminaries of the different folk traditions are Lalon Fokir, Abbasuddin Ahmed, Shah Abdul Karim, Radharaman Dutta, Hason Raja, Khursheed Nurali (Sheerazi), Ramesh Shil and Kari Amir Uddin Ahmed. Folk songs are characterised by simple musical structure and words. Before the advent of radio, entertainment in the rural areas relied on a large extent on stage performances by folk singers. With the arrival of new communication technologies and digital media, many folk songs were modernised and incorporated into modern songs (Adhunik songeet).

Folk music can be classified into several subgenres:

- Baul: mainly inspired by Lalon and almost exclusively performed by Baul mystics.
- Bhandari: Devotional music from the South (mainly Chittagong).
- Bhatiali: Music of fishermen and boatman, almost always tied by a common ragas sung solo.
- Bhawaiya: Song of bullock-cart drivers of the North (Rangpur).
- Dhamail: A form of folk music and dance originated in Sylhet and Mymensingh region. It is practiced in the Sylhet and Mymensingh Division in Bangladesh and in areas influenced by the culture of Sylhet such as the Barak Valley of Assam and parts of Tripura, Meghalaya and Manipur in India.
- Gazir Gaan: Devotional songs dedicated to Gazi Pir, who is part of Pach Pir tradition of folk practice and belief.
- Ghazal: Popular folk music of Sufi genres, introduced from philosophy and religion in music practiced mainly by Bengali Muslims.
- Gombhira: Song (originated in Chapai Nawabganj and Malda) performed with a particular distinctive rhythm and dance with two performers, always personifying a man and his grand father, discussing a topic to raise social awareness.
- Hason Raja: Devotional songs written by a music composer by the name of Hason Raja (from Sylhet, northeastern side of Bangladesh near Assam) that was recently repopularised as dance music.
- Jari: songs involving musical battle between two groups
- Jatra Pala: songs associated exclusively with plays (performed on-stage). Usually involves colourful presentations of historical themes.
- Jhumur: traditional dance song form Bangladesh and eastern part of India.
- Kavigan: poems sung with simple music usually presented on stage as a musical battle between poets.
- Kirtan: devotional song depicting love to Hindu God Krishna and his (best-known) lover Radha.
- Lalon: best known of all folk songs and the most important subgenre of Baul songs, almost entirely attributed to spiritual writer and composer, Lalon Fokir of Kushtia. He is known to all in West Bengal of India too.(Western Bangladesh, near the border with West Bengal).
- Pala Gaan: folk ballad also known as Pat.
- Sari: sung especially by boatmen. It is often known as workmen's song as well.
- Shyama Sangeet: a genre of Bengali devotional songs dedicated to the Hindu goddess Shyama or Kali which is a form of supreme universal mother-goddess Durga or parvati. It is also known as Shaktagiti or Durgastuti.

=== Baul ===
Baul is the most commonly known category of Bangladeshi folk songs. It is mostly performed by hermits who are followers of Sufism and Vaishnavism in Bangladesh. Present day Sufis earn mainly from performing their music. Baul songs incorporate simple words expressing songs with deeper meanings involving creation, society, lifestyle and human emotions. The songs are performed with very little musical support to the main carrier, the vocal. Instruments used include the Ektara ("one-string"), Dotara ("two-strings"), ba(n)shi (country flute made from bamboo) and cymbals.

=== রবীন্দ্র সঙ্গীত (Music of Robindra) ===
Rabindra Sangeet (Bengali: রবীন্দ্রসঙ্গীত Robindro shonggit, Bengali pronunciation: [ɾobindɾo ʃoŋɡit]), also known as Tagore Songs, are songs written and composed by Rabindranath Tagore. They have distinctive characteristics in the music of Bengal, popular in India and Bangladesh. "Sangeet" means music, "Rabindra Sangeet" means Songs of Rabindra.

Rabindra Sangeet used Indian classical music and traditional folk music as sources.

=== নজরুল গীতি (Music of Nazrul) ===
Nazrul Geeti or Nazrul Sangeet, literally "music of Nazrul," are songs written and composed by Kazi Nazrul Islam, a Bengali poet and national poet of Bangladesh and active revolutionary during the Indian Independence Movement. Nazrul Sangeet incorporate revolutionary notions as well as more spiritual, philosophical and romantic themes.

=== শাহ আবদুল করিম (Music of Shah Abdul Karim) ===
Shah Abdul Karim, also known as the "Baul Samrat" or "King of Baul Music", has composed over 1,600 Baul songs. Some of his most notable compositions include "Keno Piriti Baraila Re Bondhu", "Murshid Dhono He Kemone Chinibo Tomare", "Nao Banailo Banailo Re Kon Mestori", "Ashi Bole Gelo Bondhu" and "Mon Mojale Ore Bawla Gaan". He referred to his compositions as 'Baul Gaan'. Through his writings, he speaks out against unfairness, injustice, prejudice and communalism. Karim portrays the love, wishes and happiness of the people of the Bhati area in his writings. He was inspired by the legendary musician Fakir Lalon Shah. Karim wrote many spiritual songs, including 'Marfati' and 'Dehatatta'. Bangla Academy has translated ten of his songs into English.

=== লালন গীতি (Music of Lalon) ===
Lalon, also known as Fakir Lalon Shah or Lalon Shah, was a Bengali poet and musician. He composed numerous songs and poems which describe his philosophy. He left no written copies of his songs, which were passed down orally and only transcribed by his followers later on. Most of his followers were also illiterate, so few of his songs exist in written form.

== Pop music ==
Western-style popular music began to strongly influence Bangladeshi music in the early 1970s. Several recording studios were then established in Dhaka, producing many pop songs about national heroes. Ferdous Wahid, who started out as a singer in the early 1970s, said "I wanted to introduce western music in Bangladesh, so after the Liberation War I decided to do pop music for our country’s people".

Azam Khan, Fakir Alamgir, Ferdous Wahid, Pilu Momtaz, Najma Zaman and Firoz Shah are considered the pioneers who brought fame to Bangladeshi pop music. Azam Khan, in particular, is known as the pop guru or pop samrat of Bangladesh.

In the genre of film music, well-known are such singers as Sabina Yasmin, Runa Laila, Andrew Kishore and so on. Sabina Yasmin has won Bangladesh National Film Award for Best Female Playback Singer 14 times, and Runa Laila has won the award 7 times. On the other hand, Andrew Kishore has won Bangladesh National Film Award for Best Male Playback Singer 8 times.

== Rock ==
Popular Rock Bands
Formed	Name	Genre	Language	City of origin
1972	Souls	Pop/Rock	Bengali	Chittagong
1972	Spondan	Pop/Rock	Bengali	Dhaka
1973	Uccharon	Pop/Rock	Bengali	Dhaka
1976	Feedback	Rock music	Bengali	Dhaka
1978	Miles	Pop/Rock	Bengali	Dhaka
1980	Nagar Baul	Hard rock, psychedelic rock	Bengali	Chittagong
1980s	Different Touch	Pop/Rock	Bengali	Khulna
1984	Warfaze	Hard rock, heavy metal music	Bengali	Chittagong
1985	Obscure	Pop and rock	Bengali	Khulna
1985	Rockstrata	Heavy Metal	Bengali	Dhaka
1986	Nova	Rock music, Hard rock, Psychedelic rock	Bengali	Dhaka
1991	Love Runs Blind	Alternative rock	Bengali	Chittagong
1991	Ark	Pop rock	Bengali	Chittagong
1993	Cryptic Fate	Progressive metal	Bengali	Dhaka
1996	Shironamhin	Folk music, alternative rock, psychedelic rock	Bengali	Dhaka
1996	Dalchhut	Rock music	Bengali	Dhaka
1998	Aurthohin	Rock music, Heavy Metal	Bengali	Dhaka
1998	Black	Rock music, alternative rock, grunge	Bengali	Dhaka
1998	Poizon Green	Thrash/Power Metal	English	Dhaka
1999	Artcell	Progressive metal, progressive rock	Bangla	Dhaka
1999	Scarecrow	Thrash Metal, metal core	Bangla	Dhaka
1999	Nemesis	Alternative rock	Bangla	Dhaka
2000	Lalon	Rock	Bangla	Dhaka
2001	Stentorian	Hard rock, heavy metal	Bangla	Dhaka
2001	Vibe	Heavy Metal	Bangla	Dhaka
2001	Satanik	Black Metal	English	Dhaka
2002	Arbovirus	Experimental music, alternative rock, Nu metal	Bangla	Dhaka
2004	Severe Dementia	Death Metal	English	Dhaka
2004	Funeral Anthem	Power Metal	Bangla	Dhaka
2005	Shohortoli	Theatrical rock	Bangla	Dhaka
2006	De-illumination	Symphonic rock, symphonic metal	Bangla	Dhaka
2006	Mechanix	Heavy Metal	Bangla	Dhaka
2006	Powersurge	Thrash Metal	Bangla	Dhaka
2007	Shunno	Alternative rock, Pop rock	Bangla	Dhaka
2007	Tribe	Acid Rock/Metal	Bangla	Dhaka
2007	Bishorgo	Rock	Bangla	Chittagong
2007	Sent Men Revolt	Spiritual Thrash, Thrash, Heavy Metal	Bangla	Dhaka
2007	GrooveTrap	Funk, R&B, Soul	English	Dhaka
2010	Bay of Bengal (band)	Experimental rock	Bengali	Chittagong
2017	Charpoka	Alternative rock	Bengali	Dhaka
2017	Avash	Alternative rock	Bengali	Dhaka
2017	Fused	Rock	Bengali	Dhaka
2018	INTROIT (band)	Alternative Rock	Bengali	Dhaka
Mrsk BGM	Dance/Electronic	Multilingual	Bengali	Chandpur

== Instruments ==
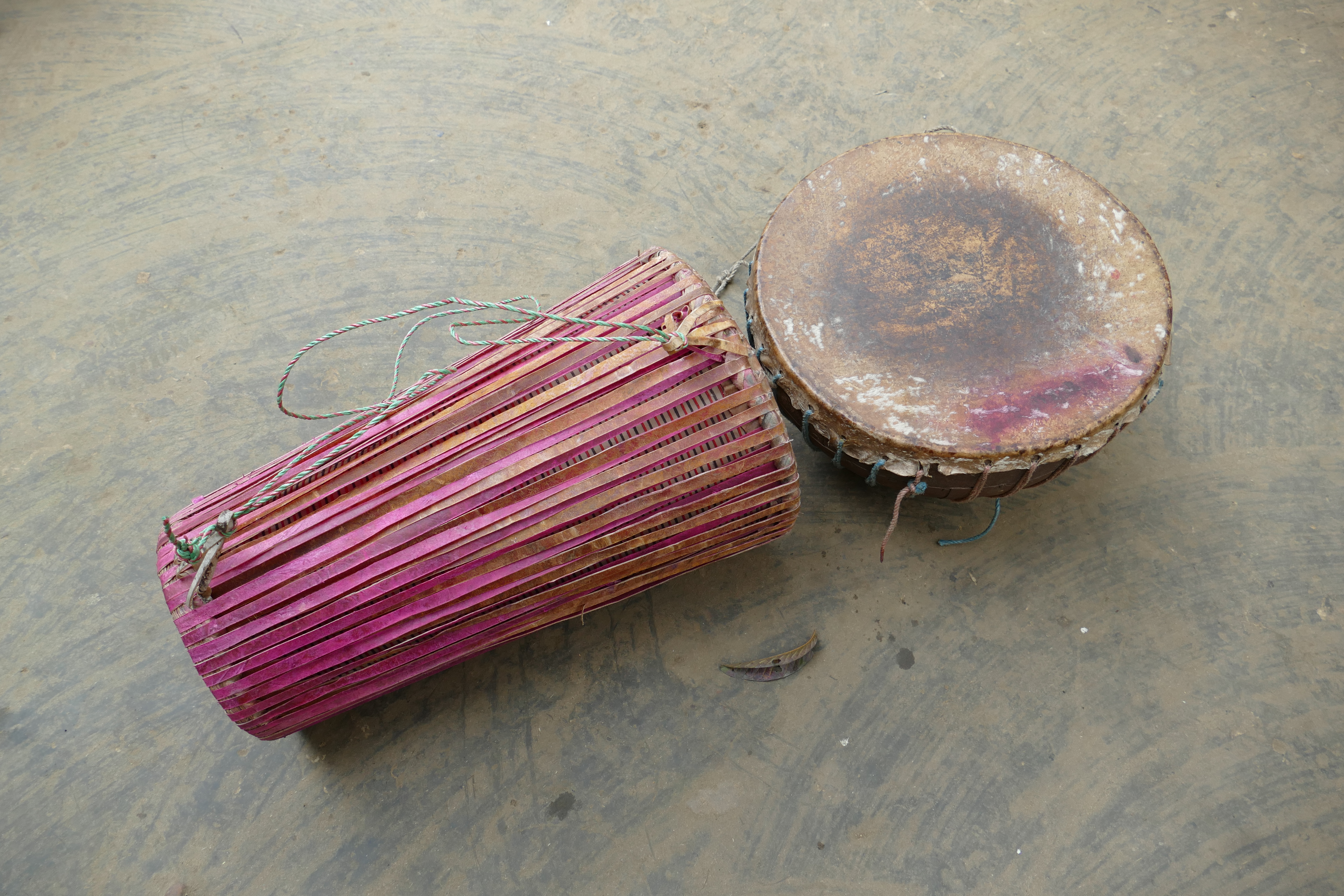
Tamak (r.) and Tumdak (l.) - typical drums of the Santhal people, photographed in a village in Dinajpur district, Bangladesh.

Common instruments are:

- Sitar
- Violin
- Flutes
- Harmonium
- Esraj (a traditional Bengali instrument)
- Ektara ("one-string")
- Dotara ("two-strings")
- Khamak
- Dhak
- Dhol

== See also ==
- Bengali folk literature
- Culture of Bengal
- Culture of India
- Culture of West Bengal
- History of Bengali literature
- Music of Bengal
- Music of West Bengal
- Bangladeshi rock
- Bangladeshi hip hop
- List of Bangladeshi musicians
- List of Bangladeshi playback singers
- Shah Abdul Karim
