= Arbovirus (band) =

Bangladeshi rock band

Arbovirus আরবোভাইরাস
- Arbovirus in Toronto 2024

Background information
- Origin: Dhaka, Bangladesh
- Genres: Alternative rock; alternative metal; experimental rock; nu metal (early)
- Years active: 2001–present
- Labels: G-Series; Independent record label
- Members: Asif Asgar Ranjan; Nafeez Al Amin; Ahmed Aldnane Alam; Sufi Maverick
- Past members: Suharto Sherif; Muntasir Mamun Shuvo; Ishtiaq Ahmed Shobhon; Ahsanur Rahman Himel; Ishtiaq Hossain Jishan; Farhan Ul Haque Tanim; Fasihuddin Ahmed; Mong Sai Marma

Arbovirus is a Bangladeshi rock band formed in 2001 in Dhaka. They have released four studio albums, one EP, and twelve singles through various mixed albums.

== History ==
=== Formation and early years (2001–2005) ===
Guitarist Duo Suharto Sherif and Asif Asgar Ranjan formed the band with Ishtiaq Ahmed Shovon on vocals and Ahsanur Rahman Himel on drums in 2002

Around mid-2002, Ishtiaq Jishan and Farhan Tanim joined as bassist and drummer respectively. In the same year, Sufi joined as a vocal to complete the lineup.

The band's early releases include singles like "আর্তনাদ (ARTONAD)" in the mixed album "আগন্তুক-২ (AGONTUK-2)", which earned them their first record deal with the label G-Series.

=== 64m 53s (2006) ===
The band released their debut album 64m 53s on 20 July 2006, under the banner of G-Series.

On 26 January 2006, Arbovirus performed their first international show at the Salt Lake Stadium on the eve of Indian Republic Day along with Warfaze, Artcell, Metal Maze, Lakkhichhara, Cactus (Indian band), Insomnia (band), and Fossils.

=== Struggle with the lineup (2008–2011) ===
In 2008 Jishan moved abroad to pursue higher education. Tanim followed the same path in 2009. Aldnane Alam joined shortly after Jishan left. Shuvo (Ex Aurthohin) joined as a drummer, but he also left the band in 2011.

In 2012 drummer Nafeez Al Amin joined the band.

=== Montobbo Nishproyojon (2012–2013) ===
ARBOVIRUS-TV

YouTube information
- Channel: ARBOVIRUS-TV
- Views: 18.6 million

In 2012 - partnering with Livesquare, and Apex Footwear Sprint as a sponsor - the band signed a deal for the second album.

In December 2012 the band performed in the "Urban Youth Festival".

They made two collaborative tracks with Beatbaksho, rapper Amewu, and one of the Voice of Germany producer DJ Werd. They also performed the entire set on the Ekushey TV, including their title track "Raise Your Voice", and "Grime Time".

Arbovirus released their second album Montobbo Nishproyojon on 5 July 2013 at the Russian Cultural Center. The album consists of eight tracks. To bridge the seven-year gap with their audience the band decided to give it away as a free digital download, and never released any physical version of it until the release of Bishesh Droshtobbo.

=== Bishesh Droshtobbo (2017) ===
Their third album, Bishesh Droshtobbo, was initially planned as a B-side album of the second album with the leftover tracks from their second album. But later on, the band decided to add more songs to it and release it as a full-length album which now consists of nine tracks.

The band organized their first-ever solo concert since their foundation to commemorate 15 years of the band and the launching of their third album. The concert was held on 13 January 2017 at the Russian Cultural Center. The album was released on their YouTube channel, and a double CD of both Montobyo Nishproyojon and Bishesh Droshtobbo was made available through pre-order home-delivery. Since the band did not sign up with any record label, they took over the CD production and packaging among the teammates. All the packaging was personally done by the band members and associated teammates.

== Lyrics ==
All of the lyrics are written in Bangla, and written by Ranjan, except for 'Artonad' by Shobhon, 'Ja Ichhe Tai', and 'Shottogatha' by Sufi, and 'Shopnadishto' by Rumman.

== Associated acts ==
Guitarist Ranjan has been contributing to different bands as a lyricist for quite a long time, even long before he formed the band. He has contributed lyrics to many prominent musicians including Miles, Artcell, and Aurthohin. Besides – he has an experimental project named Purple Haze, Lare Lappa, and recently Offend My Ego.

On 15 January 2015, Sufi along with Polash from Warfaze, Shakib from Cryptic Fate, Jamshed from Powersurge performed at the curtain closing show of Rockstrata, one of the pioneering heavy metal bands of Bangladesh.

Bassist Aldnane also has been playing and writing lyrics for the experimental rock band Kral. He is also a part of the progressive instrumental supergroup Air and Air which released its first studio album in 2014.

Drummer Nafeez has previously played for Dethrow, Breach, Kronic, Elita Karim and Friends, and Jazzy Chopsticks. In 2019 Nafeez got the endorsement from Soultone Cymbals.

== Dispute over the line-up and legal rights ==
After September 2022, Suharto hired the then-touring members (Shahan Kamal Uday, Muntasir Mamun Shopno, Shams Alim Biswas, Syaemul Islam Riyad) as the permanent members without any prior consent from the present, original members (Ranjan, Aldnane, Nafeez, Sufi). Apart from that he had also taken full control over all the social media platforms deleting one EP OTOPOR, and one live album BISHESH DROSHTOBBO : SHORASHORI SHOMPROCHAR which was written and composed by the rest four members. On 25 June 2023, Suharto received legal notice from the original members to refrain from performing under the name 'Arbovirus' and using the logo for any business purpose. Despite receiving the legal notice, Suharto continues to illegally perform and release songs under the name of Arbovirus, using the copyrighted logo.

== Discography ==
=== Studio albums ===
- 64m 53s (20 July 2006)
- Montobbo Nishproyojon (5 July 2013)
- Bishesh Droshtobbo (13 January 2017)
- Bishesh Droshtobbo : Shorashori Shomprochar (1 June 2017)

=== Extended play ===
- Otopor (14 April 2019)

=== Singles (in various mixed albums) ===
- Aartonad in Agantuk 2 (2003)
- Obhishap in Din Bodol (2004)
- Shopnadishto in Lokayot (2004)
- Shohor in Boka Manushta {ft. Sumon Saidus Salehin Khaled Sumon of Aurthohin} (2007)
- Shurjo Shontan in Live Now (2007)
- Prayoshchitto in Bonno {ft. Fuad al Muqtadir} (2007)
- Addhek Kotha in Rock 101 (2008)
- Keu Karo Noy in Rock 202 (2009)
- Prarthona in Rock 505 (2010)
- Bangladesh Gori in Gorje Uttho Bangladesh (2011)
- Agontuk in Rock 606 (2011)
- Goal in Rock 808 (2015)
- Padmar Gaan in Nodi Rocks Project (2022)

== Band members ==
=== Current ===
- Asif Asgar Ranjan – Lyrics, Guitars (2001–2022)
- Sufi Maverick – Vocals (2003–2022; 2023-present)
- Ahmed Aldnane Alam - Bass (2009–present)
- Nafeez Al Amin – Drums (2012–present)

=== Former ===
- Suharto Sherif – Guitars, Vocals (2001– present)
- Ishtiaq Ahmed Shovon – Vocals (2001–2003)
- Ahsanur Rahman Himel – Drums (2001–2003)
- Ishtiaq Hossain Jishan – Bass (2003–2008)
- Farhan Tanim – Drums (2003–2009)
- Muntasir Mamun Shuvo – Drums (2010–2011)

=== Touring ===
- Fasihuddin Ahmed - Guitars (2016–2020)
- Mong Sai Marma - Bass (2016–2021)
