= Bebshar Poristhiti =

2022 song by Aly Hasan and his team

"Bebshar Porishthiti"

Song by Aly Hasan, Sadi Vai, Manam, Aamin Ale Uday, Rakib Hasan, Maruf Akan, Siam Hawladar, Mr. Rizan
- Language: Bengali
- Released: 11 August 2022
- Studio: CBLS Records
- Venue: Dhaka, Bangladesh
- Genre: Hip hop music
- Length: 3:37
- Label: G-Series
- Songwriter: Aly Hasan
- Producer: Sadi Vai
External videos
- "Music video" on YouTube

"Bebshar Poristhiti" (Bengali: ব্যবসায় পরিস্থিতি, lit. 'Situation of Business') is a rap song by Aly Hasan released in 2022. The song went viral and appreciated in Bangladesh after its release on August 11. The song tells the story of a businessman's plight during the recession during the COVID-19 pandemic.

== Background ==
The artist, composer and lyricist of the song is Aly Hasan. Around 2010, he used to make rap songs which he used to upload on his YouTube channel named "Khaas Bangla". But those songs were not popular. Also he used to sing in concerts. He got his inspiration for rap music from his paternal grandmother. He used to talk to his grandmother in a funny way. He was an expatriate from Qatar who returned home in 2017 after a three-year stay to take over the management of his father's hardware store in Narayanganj. While in charge of the shop, he used to talk to the customers in rhythm. He used to write down those rhythms in his diary. The continuous loss in his business was another inspiration for his song. He didn't release the song to be popular but he released the song to highlight his business story.

== Record and release ==
He started production of the song in February 2022 when he sold the store. He recorded the song with his own funds in May. After he posted the song on Facebook, G-Series released it on 11 August 2022. With permission from an acquaintance's father, he shot the song's music video in a shop. After waiting for 4 hours from 11 am, he shot the video there after the shop owner left. The music video gets at least 0.3 million views in one day on YouTube.

== Reception ==
The song became popular and went viral as it depicted the plight, problems and struggles of a businessman during the COVID-19 pandemic. Bangladeshi film director Mostofa Sarwar Farooki said about the song, "This is the real gold. The work of art captures its time. In this song, its artists are sitting on the chest of time and playing Sarinda!" Besides, the netizens of the country also praised Aly Hassan for acting in the music video. Shahriar Nafees praised the song.
