= Mechanix (disambiguation) =

Mechanix may refer to:

- "Mechanix" (aka "The Mechanix"), a song written by Dave Mustaine and also performed separately by Metallica and Megadeth
- Mechanix (album), a heavy metal album by UFO originally released in 1982
- Mechanix Illustrated, an American magazine published during the 20th century
- Mechanix Wear, a manufacturer of high performance work gloves and other clothing
- Detroit Mechanix, a professional Ultimate frisbee team that is a charter member of Ultimate Frisbee Association (formerly, the American Ultimate Disc League, aka AUDL).
- Mechanix (band), a heavy metal band from Bangladesh
