= Arbovirus (disambiguation) =

Arbovirus is a shortened name given to viruses that are transmitted by arthropods, or arthropod-borne viruses.

Arbovirus may also refer to:

- Arbovirus (band), Bangladeshi alternative rock band
- Arbovirus encephalitis, encephalitis diseases caused by an arbovirus infection
