= De-illumination =

Bangladeshi metal band

- Origin: Dhaka, Bangladesh
- Genres: Symphonic metal; heavy metal
- Years active: 2006–present
- Label: G Series
- Members: Shams Mansoor Ghani; Sazzad Arefeen; Aqib Kamal; Anabil Sen; Zillur Rahman Mithu
- Past members: Samiul Islam; Sabbir; Rozario Rony
- Website: de-illumination.com

De-illumination is a Bangladeshi metal band formed in October 2006 in Dhaka. Their debut album অনিবার্য (Inevitable) was released in 2010.

== History ==
=== Formation and early days (2006–2007) ===
De-illumination was formed with a vision to introduce a new genre, the Symphonic rock/Symphonic metal to Bangladeshi music. Sazzad Arefeen, one of the founding members of the band, had been working on and studying the genre since 1999. Later, Shams Mansoor Ghani, the then keyboardist of Warfaze offered his assistance and the duo started to work on the genre. Around 2006, they felt that they had made enough experiments so Shams proposed to go public. They asked Samiul, then drummer of Power Surge to join them. Anabil and Rony joined later and thus De-illumination was formed. During the experiments with the genre, Arefeen and Shams faced some technical difficulties since the genre was pretty new to the local music scene.

=== "অনিবার্য (Inevitable)" (2008–2010) ===
Before releasing their debut album, De-illumination released five singles in various mixed albums along with other Bangladeshi bands. In February 2008, they released their tracks "Choto Shopno" and "Jantrik Joddha" in the mixed band album Dabanol. Their next appearance was in another mixed band album Rage-1 with the track "Ekhoni Shomoy" released in August the same year. A year later, De-illumination released its fourth single "Hamaguri" through the album Proloy.

In August 2010, De-illumination released their debut album Onibarjo which they claim to be the first Concept album in Bangladesh bearing the genre Symphonic Rock/Metal with a regional soul. De-illumination visited almost all the major cities of Bangladesh to promote the album. Their campaign to promote the album was titled "Onibarjo De-nation Public launch and visit tour" which got good response across the country. ABC Radio joined them as their Radio Alliance. At the seventh Citycell-Channel i Music Awards, De-illumination won the Judges' choice for best band

=== Social activism ===
De-illumination have participated in different charity shows. Recently they have performed in a charity concert arranged by Bangladesh International Recovery Developmentsfor street children. Half of the money was donated to Savar victims too.

== Discography ==
=== Studio albums ===
- "অনিবার্য (Inevitable)" (2010)

== Members ==
=== Present members ===
- Aqib Kamal – vocals (2006–present)
- Sazzad Arefeen – guitars (2006–present)
- Anabil Sen – bass (2011–present)
- Shams Mansoor Ghani – keyboards (2006–present)
- Zillur Rahman Mithu – drums (2015–present)

=== Past members ===
- Samiul Islam – drums (2004–2007)
- Rozario Rony – vocals (2004–2011)
- Sabbir – drums (2007–2015)
