= Bangladesh International Recovery Developments =

Bangladesh Int. Recovery Developments (BIRD)
- Founded: 2011
- Founder: Kaisar Al Islam Ayesha Hamid (Co-Founder)
- Type: Non-Profit
- Purpose: Children
- Location(s): London, United Kingdom; Dhaka, Bangladesh
- Region served: South Asia, Bangladesh
- Key people: Kaisar Al Islam – President
- Website: www.charitybird.org

Bangladesh International Recovery Developments, also known as BIRD, based in Bangladesh and United Kingdom, is one of the first and few youth-based Bangladeshi students communities and non-profit organisation, established in December 2011. It is one of the first UK based Bangladeshi students communities in Britain. BIRD operates with the help of hundreds of volunteers from different countries like Bangladesh, United Kingdom and Qatar, also it arranges various fundraising events to run BIRD Schools BIRD is registered in England and Wales with the charity commission.

== History ==
The idea of BIRD first came from the founder and president Kaisar Al Islam in September 2011 who was then a student, studying in a flying school in London. He saw the differences between the lifestyle of people in England and Bangladesh and how a few pound could make a huge difference in the life of a street child in Bangladesh. From that realisation he founded the charity along with his two friends in December 2011

== Objectives ==
The relief of poverty, sickness, hardship, and distress of children and the advancement of education for the public benefit of children in particular but not exclusively orphans, street children and underprivileged children and their families, primarily living in Bangladesh and other developing counties as the trustees see fit, by providing goods and services.

=== Education ===
BIRD operates few tuition fee free schools in Dhaka

=== Social Activities ===
In 2012, BIRD arranged a lot of events with underprivileged children i.e. Food Giveaway, Painting Competition, Just for warmth etc. In 2013, BIRD arranged a charity concert called "Let's fly" to raise funds for BIRD Schools where bands like Arbovirus (band), Nemesis (Bangladeshi band) performed. Half of the money was donated to the victims of Savar Tragedy.

== BIRD 4 SAVAR ==
BIRD 4 SAVAR is a sister concern of Bangladesh International Recovery Developments. BIRD 4 SAVAR is dedicated to the people who were affected by Savar Tragedy 2013. The purpose of BIRD 4 Savar is to work with the families and people who lost their major earners during the building collapse of Rana Plaza in 2013. A number of families has already been helped. In 2013 a Qatar-based fashion house named 'LAS Fashion' partnered with BIRD and hosted a fashion show to raise funds for the victims of 2013 Savar building collapse. BIRD has been working on the rehabilitation of the victims of 2013 Savar building collapse

== Board ==
- Kaisar Al Islam, Founder and President
- Chelsea Victoria Needham, Vice-president
- Tahsin Upa, General Secretary
- Tazreen Sikder, Project Manager

== Awards and nominations ==
- Muslim Awards - Nominated for the best Muslim Association of the year - 2014
