= Powersurge (band) =

Bangladeshi thrash metal band

Powersurge পাওয়ার্সার্জ
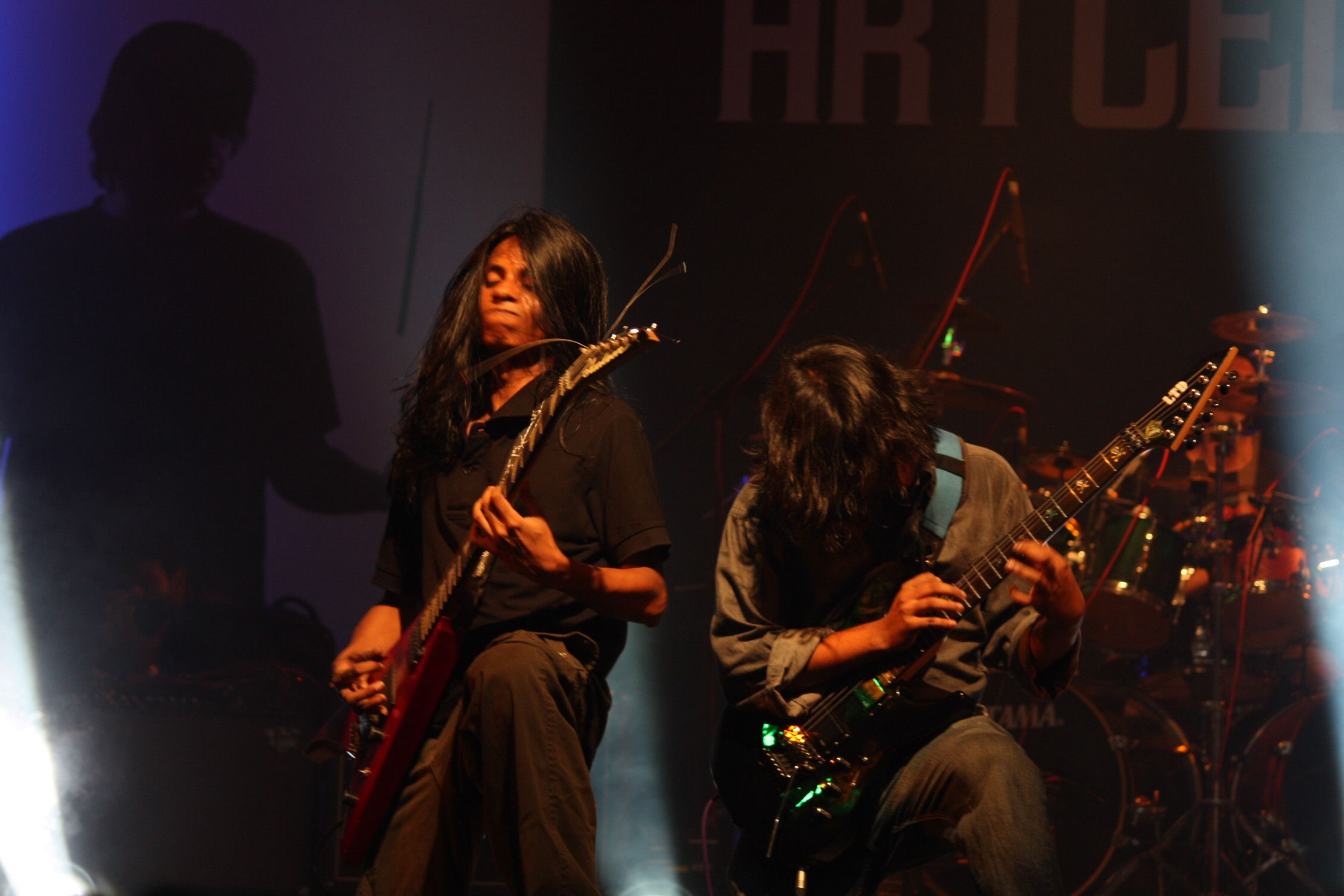
- Powersurge performing in 2009

Background information
- Origin: Dhaka, Bangladesh
- Genres: Thrash metal; groove metal
- Years active: 2006–present
- Label: G-Series
- Members: Jamshed Chowdhury; Samir Hafiz; Saimum Hasan Nahian; Kawsar Ahmed; Asif Mahmood
- Past members: Schizan Shahed; Shahriar Firoz; Arefin Ahmed; Samiul Islam
- Website: Powersurge on Facebook

Powersurge is a Bangladeshi thrash/groove metal band formed in Dhaka in 2006. They are a pioneering thrash metal band in the country, and part of the "East Bengal extreme metal scene". The group came to public attention in 2007, after winning D-Rockstar II, a rock and metal talent show.

The original lineup consisted of vocalist Jamshed Chowdhury, lead guitarist Samir Hafiz, rhythm guitarist Saimum Hasan Nahian, bassist Schizan Shahed Antu, and drummer Samiul Islam. In mid-2006, they released their first single, "Durboddho Monushotto", in a mixed album named Underground. In 2007, they won D-Rockstars II. In August 2008, they released their only studio album, "অপ্রস্তুত যুদ্ধ (Unprepared War)", which contained hit songs like the title track, "হাঙ্গর (Shark)", "মিথ্যের আগ্রাসন (False Aggression)", "Powersurge" and "শেষ সীমানা (End of Border)".

== History ==
=== Formation and early years (2006–2007) ===
Powersurge was formed in Dhaka in January 2006, by guitarist Saimum Hasan Nahian when he aligned with drummer Samiul Islam to form a thrash metal band. The band recruited Jamshed Chowdhury as lead singer, Samir Hafiz as lead guitarist, and Schizan Shahed Antu as bassist. The group were fans of the American thrash metal and German thrash metal bands like Metallica, Slayer, Megadeth, Exodus, Sepultura, Kreator and Sodom. They covered songs of those bands in the underground shows and gained popularity with their aggressive style of playing heavy metal music. They released their first single "দুর্বোধ্য মনুষত্ব (Rampant Humanity)" in the mixed album Underground in 2006. In 2007, they took part in the D-Rockstar II, where they became the winner by defeating other hard rock and heavy metal bands like Radioactive (second place) and Mechanix (third place).

=== অপ্রস্তুত যুদ্ধ (Unprepared War) (2007–2008) ===
In June 2008, Powersurge went to Sound Garden Studio to record their first studio album "অপ্রস্তুত যুদ্ধ (Unprepared War)". It included several hit songs like "অপ্রস্তুত যুদ্ধ (Unprepared War)", "মিথ্যের আগ্রাসন (False Aggression)", "হাঙ্গর (Shark)", "শেষ সীমানা (End of Border)" and "Powersurge". The band rose to fame in the underground metal scene in Dhaka and became one of the leading bands in the "East Bengal extreme metal scene".

== Discography ==
=== Studio albums ===
- অপ্রস্তুত যুদ্ধ (Unprepared War) (2008)

== Members ==
=== Present ===
- Jamshed Chowdhury – vocals (2006–present)
- Samir Hafiz – lead guitars (2006–2011; 2013–present)
- Saimum Hasan Nahian – rhythm guitars (2006–present)
- Kawsar Ahmed Parvez – bass (2011–present)
- Asif Mahmood – drums (2013–present)

=== Past ===
- Shahriar Firoz Tonmoy – bass (2006–2008)
- Arefin Ahmed Saeed – bass (2008–2011)
- Samiul Islam – drums (2006–2013)
