= Soultone Cymbals =

Cymbal manufacturer based in Los Angeles

- Company type: Private
- Industry: Musical instruments
- Founded: 2003; 23 years ago in Los Angeles, California
- Founder: Iki Levy, Tamara Levy
- Headquarters: Los Angeles, California, United States
- Key people: Iki Levy
- Products: Cymbals, Drum sticks
- Owners: Iki Levy, Founder/Current CEO, Tamara Levy
- Website: soultonecymbals.com

Soultone Cymbals, commonly known as Soultone, is a cymbal manufacturing company based in Los Angeles, California. It was founded in 2003 by Iki Levy, after struggling to address frustrations with the major cymbal manufacturers over quality issues.

Originally, as the proprietor of the Los Angeles drum specialty shop, The Drum Connection, Iki put his first Soultone models on the showroom floor with acoustic drums, so that customers could demo them as opposed to hanging them on a display.

Artists known to use Soultone cymbals include

- Steven Adler of Guns N' Roses,
- Nick Menza of Megadeth
- Dave Goode of Mahogany Rush
- Eddy Jones of Head East
- Veronica Bellino of Jeff Beck and LL Cool J
- Nick Smith of Snoop Dogg,
- Eric Seats of Patti LaBelle
- Ron Allen of SoMo
- Jerry Tee of Jerry Tee Live Percussionist
- Jerohn Garnett of Mariah Carey,
- Adrian Peek of Mighty Joe Young and Roy Ayers
- Alex Hilton of Kim Betts
- Shane O'Brien of I Killed the Prom Queen
- Eric Morotti of Suffocation
- Jeremiah Stratton of Hed PE
- Martin Osborne of Shadow Warriors
- Eddie Vallee of Boomer
- Rico H. of Stoneman
- Brian Doherty of Making Monsters.
