= Mechanix (band) =

Bangladeshi heavy metal band

Mechanix মেকানিক্স
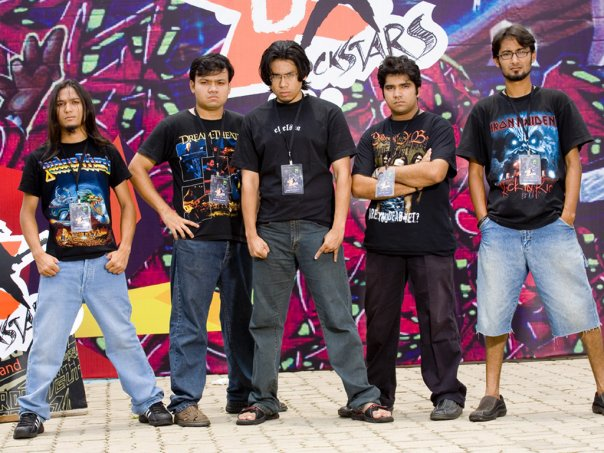
- Mechanix in 2008

Background information
- Origin: Dhaka, Bangladesh
- Genres: Heavy metal, thrash metal, progressive music
- Years active: 2005–present
- Label: Deadline Music
- Members: Aftabuzzaman Tridib; Sheikh M. Reaz; Shafat Ahmed Chowdhury
- Past members: Imran Ahmed; Rusho Khan; Tamzid Khan; Zeheen Ahmed; Nadvi Walid; Shahed Hossain; Tanim Pabel; Salek Ahmed Siddique; Rayhan Islam Shuvro; Saif Irfan; Soumik Islam

Mechanix (Bengali: মেকানিক্স) is a Bangladeshi heavy metal band formed in Dhaka, Bangladesh on 23 November 2005.

== History ==
Mechanix was formed on 23 November 2005 in Dhanmondi, Dhaka, by vocalist Aftabuzzaman Tridib, drummer Sheikh M. Reaz, bassist Rusho Khan and guitarist Tamzid Khan. Within a month Imran Ahmed joined as a second guitarist. The band achieved national visibility in 2007 as semi-finalists on the musical reality television competition D-Rockstars, where Sheikh M. Reaz was named "Best Drummer." During the audition rounds, their performances earned high praise from judges Shafin Ahmed, Ershad Zaman, Tony. In the main competition, their original tracks "Kalo Bikkhob" and "Oporajeyo" garnered a massive response from the audience. That same year, Mechanix released their debut single, "Jhoddha,", which was featured in the mixed compilation album Underground 2, coordinated by Warfaze guitarist Ibrahim Ahmed Kamal. Guitarist Imran Ahmed departed in 2008 and was replaced by Zeheen Ahmed. The updated lineup contributed tracks to several compilation albums, including "Dhruboshor" on Rock 202 and 303 in 2009 and "Itihas '71" on Rock 404 and 505 in 2010. On 1 October 2010, the band performed at the Bangladesh Musical Bands Association (BAMBA) organized "Concert for Sundarban" at the Bangladesh Army Stadium. Following the departure of bassist Rusho Khan in 2010, Nadvi Walid joined the band, and Mechanix released their debut solo studio album, Oporajeyo, in 2011 through Deadline Music, followed by their first English-language single, "Enemy Within," in 2012.

In 2013, Tamzid Khan and Nadvi Walid left the band, leading to the recruitment of guitarist Shahed Hossain and bassist Tanim Pabel; this configuration released the single "Elegy" on the 2015 compilation Rock 808. Between 2015 and 2016, guitarist Shafat Ahmed Chowdhury joined the roster, while Salek Ahmed Siddique replaced Pabel on bass. On 22 July 2017, lead guitarist Zeheen Ahmed died by suicide, caused a temporary hiatus before the group resumed live activity later that year with guest musician Rayhan Islam Shuvro. In June 2018, Mechanix released "Niyoti," a single dedicated to Zeheen Ahmed. Later that year, bassist Soumik Islam and guitarist Saif Irfan replaced Siddique and Shuvro. On 25 December 2019, the group performed at the "20 Years of Artcellism" concert to honor fellow pioneer heavy metal band Artcell. In November 2020 The band released the single "Mlanchitro". In March 2023 they released another single "Swapnobhongo".

On 26 June 2023, Mechanix collaborated with Raef Al Hasan Rafa, Shishir Ahmed, and hip-hop artist Black Zang to release "Escape," as the official heavy metal theme song for the pop culture festival Dhaka Summer Con 2023. on January 9, 2024, when their former guitarist, Shahed Hossain, was killed in a hit-and-run road accident in Uttara. Mechanix issued a public tribute. On 20 September 2024 Mechanix performed in the "United We Stand" charity concert for flood relief intended for August 2024 floods. On December 27, 2025, Mechanix celebrated two decades of the band with an anniversary event titled "An Evening with Mechanix" at the Krishibid Institution Bangladesh Auditorium in Dhaka. The show included guest appearances from prominent musicians across generations, including members of Miles, Warfaze, LRB, and Artcell. In June 2026, the band announced the departure of long-time members Saif Irfan and Soumik Islam due to scheduling conflicts, alongside the announcement of their second studio album, Ojoggo, and the release of its lead singles, "Ojoggo" and "Kholnayok."

== Band Members ==
=== Current members ===
- Aftabuzzaman Tridib – lead vocals (2005–present)
- Sheikh M. Reaz – drums, percussion (2005–present)
- Shafat Ahmed Chowdhury – guitars (2016–present)

=== Past members ===
- Imran Ahmed – guitars (2005–2008)
- Rusho Khan – bass guitar (2005–2010)
- Tamzid Khan – guitars (2005–2013)
- Zeheen Ahmed – guitars (2008–2017; died 2017)
- Nadvi Walid – bass guitar (2010–2013, 2016)
- Shahed Hossain – guitars (2013–2016; died 2024)
- Tanim Pabel – bass guitar (2013–2016)
- Salek Ahmed Siddique – bass guitar (2016–2018)
- Rayhan Islam Shuvro – guitars (2017–2018)
- Saif Irfan – guitars (2018–2026)
- Soumik Islam – bass guitar (2018–2026)
