= Nagar Baul =

Bangladeshi rock band

Nagar Baul নগর বাউল
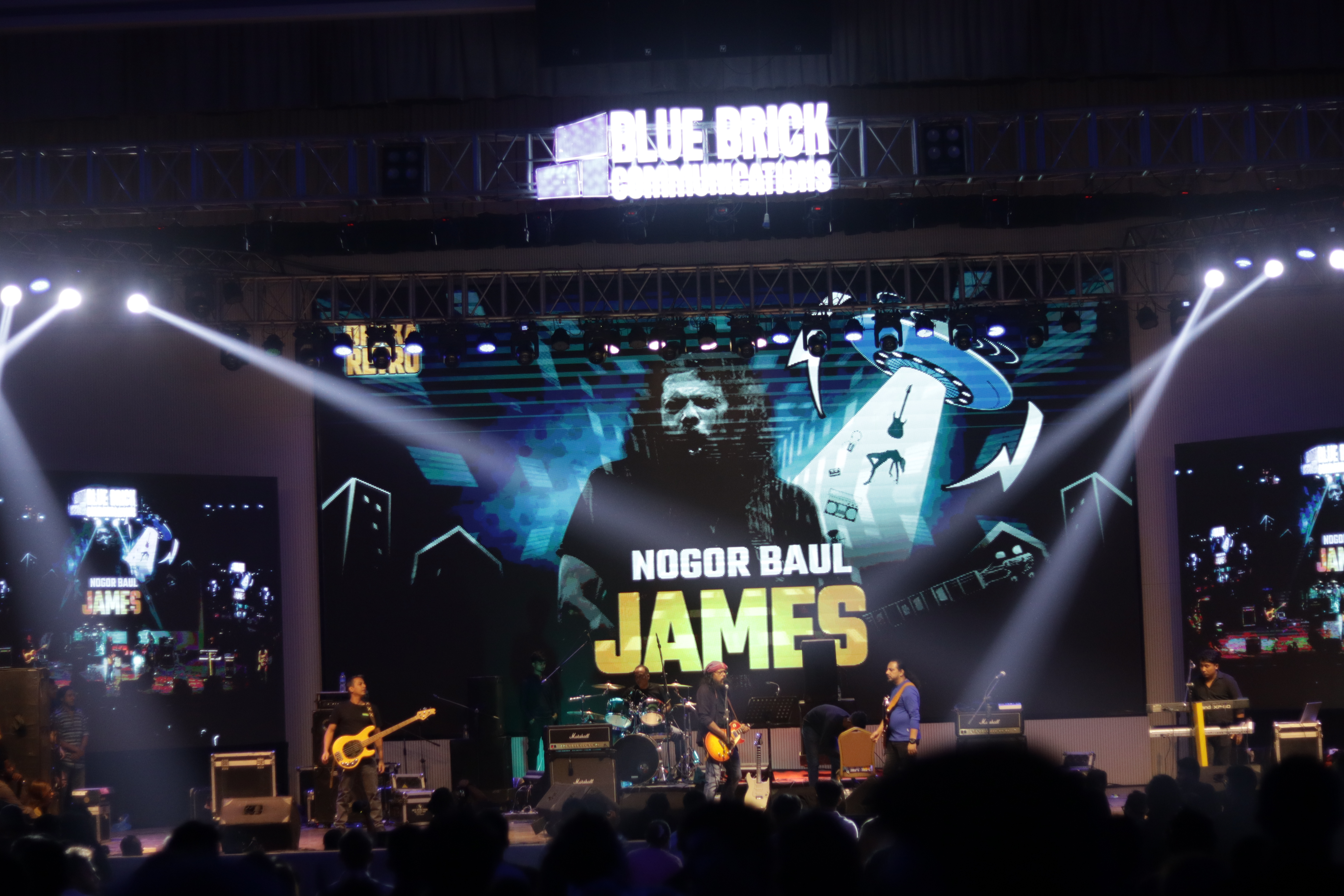
- Nagar Baul 2024

Background information
- Also known as: Feelings (1977–1999)
- Origin: Chittagong, Bangladesh
- Genres: Psychedelic rock; hard rock; blues rock
- Years active: 1977–present
- Members: Faruq Mahfuz Anam James; Ishmamul Farhad; Ahsan Elahi Fanty; Talukdar Sabbir
- Past members: Ayub Bachchu; Saidul Hasan Swapan; Pantha Kanai; Md. Imtiaz Ali Zimi; Khayem Ahmed; Azizur Rahman Tinku; Kumar Bishwajit; Saidus Salehin Khaled Sumon; Khokhon Chakrabarty; Sultan Raihan Khan

Nagar Baul (English: Urban Baul) is a Bangladeshi rock band that was founded in Chittagong in 1977 by Kumar Bishwajit. The band is considered to be one of the pioneers of rock and blues music in the country. The frontman of the band, James, is referred to as the "Guru of Rock" as a mark of respect.

== History ==
Nagar Baul started in 1977 and was originally named Feelings and was formed by Kumar Bishwajit. Band members included Ayub Bachchu and James. Ayub Bachchu left the band in 1980.

They released their first album, Station Road. James, lead vocal and guitarist, composed all the tracks, and wrote the lyrics for five of them. Though the album was not a hit, the tracks "Ager Jonome", "Amai Jete Dao" and "Rupshagor" enjoyed moderate success.

In 1993, they released their second album, Jail Theke Bolchhi. This album was a major hit, and Feelings became a mainstream band.

In 1996, they released their third album, Nagar Baul. The Daily Star wrote, "Nagar Baul introduced Bangladesh to a whole new way of singing". It had the "classic" and "iconic" song, "Taray Taray Rotiye Debo", based on the poem "Uttor" by great poet Shamsur Rahman.

In 1998, they released their fourth album, Lais Fita Lais.

In 1999, the band was renamed from Feelings to Nagar Baul.

In 2001, their fifth album, Dushtur Cheler Dol, was released. This was their first album release under the new band name Nagar Baul, named after their album from 1996.

== Members ==
Present members

- Faruq Mahfuz Anam James — vocals, lead guitars (1983–present)
- Ahsan Elahi Fanty – drums (1984–present)
- Ishmamul Farhad – lead guitars (2026–present)
- Talukdar Sabbir – Bass guitar (2011–present)
- Shawon – Keyboardist (present)

Past members

- Ayub Bachchu – lead guitars (1977–1980)
- Saidul Hasan Swapan – bass guitar (1987–1990)
- Saidus Salehin Khaled Sumon – vocals, bass guitar (1990)
- Pantha Kanai – drums (1999–2000)
- Khayem Ahmed – keyboards
- Kumar Bishwajit – lead vocals (1977–1980)
- Shimul Azhar – bass guitar (2021-2023)
- Azizur Rahman Tinku
- Md Imtiaz Ali Zimi – drums(2007-2017)
- Khokhon Chakrabarty – keyboard
- Golamur Rahman Romel — Drums (2001-2004)
- Sultan Raihan Khan – lead guitars (2008–2026)

== Discography ==
- "স্টেশন রোড (Station Road) (1987) (Originally known as Feelings)
- "জেল থেকে বলছি (Speaking from Jail)" (1993)
- "নগর বাউল (Urban Baul)" (1996)
- "লেইস ফিতা লেইস (Lace Ribbon Lace)" (1998)
- "দুষ্ট ছেলের দল (Mischievous Boys' Party)" (2001)
