= Nemesis (Bangladeshi band) =

Bangladeshi alternative rock band

Nemesis নেমেসিস
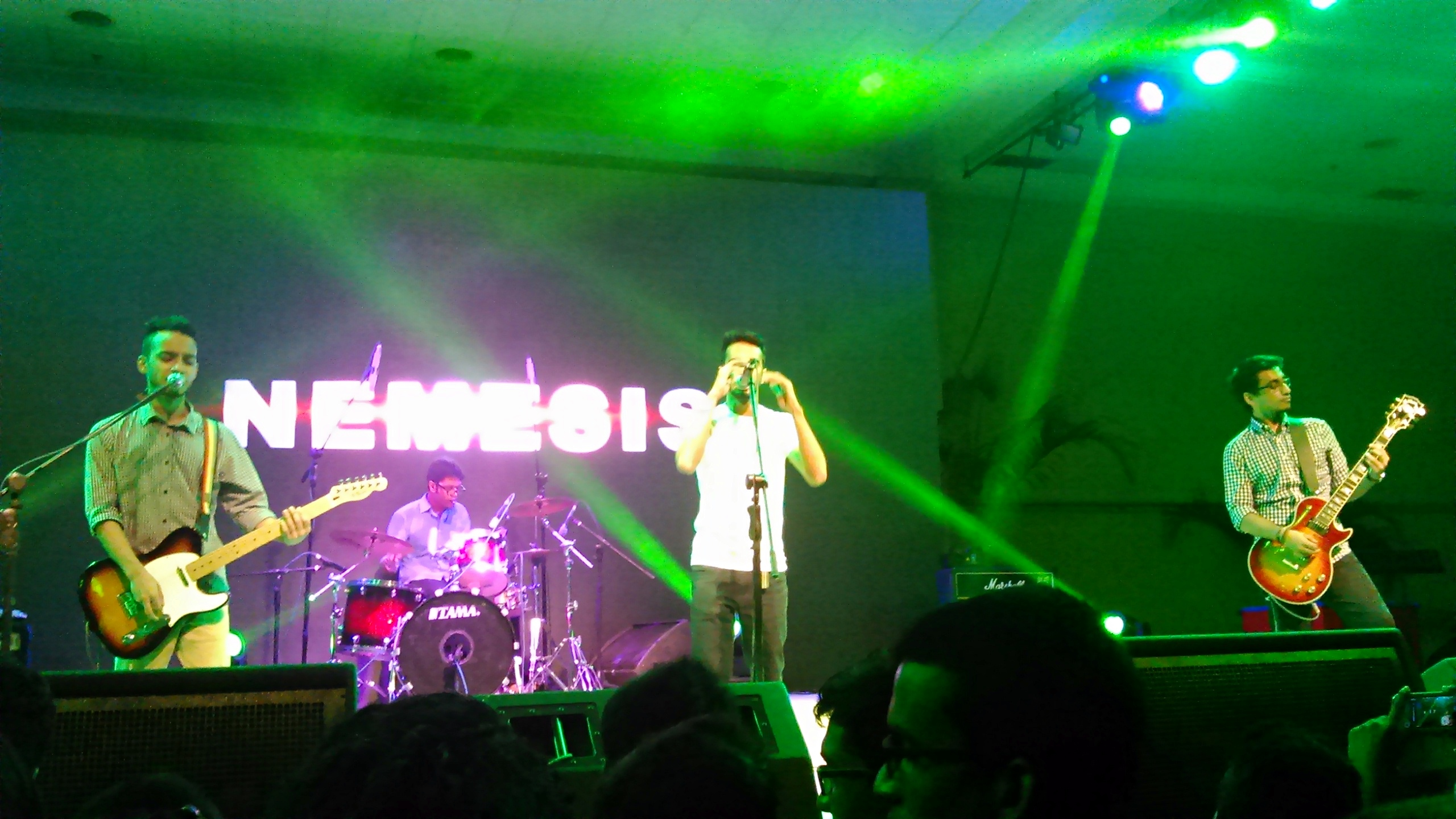
- Nemesis performing in 2014

Background information
- Origin: Dhaka, Bangladesh
- Genres: Alternative rock
- Years active: 1999–present
- Labels: G-Series; Deadline Music
- Members: Zohad Reza Chowdhury; Sultan Rafsan Khan; Raquibun Nabi Ratul; Ifaz Abrar Reza; Jeffrey Ovijit
- Past members: Maher Khan; Nondito Noor; Omayr Khan; Yawar Mehboob; Zeheen Ahmed; Zerif Ahmed; Zafir Huq
- Website: nemesisbd.com

Nemesis is a Bangladeshi rock band formed in 1999 in Dhaka. They are one of the most popular rock bands in Bangladesh. The band rose to mainstream fame in the late 2000s and early 2010s with their hit songs like "Obocheton", "Kolporajjo", "Bir" and "Kobe". Since 1999, they have released three studio albums. The line-up includes vocalist Zohad Reza Chowdhury, guitarist Ifaz Abrar Reza, guitarists Sultan Rafsan Khan, bassist Raquibun Nabi Ratul and drummer Jeffery Ovijit and Dio Haque.

== History ==
=== 1999–2003: Formation and Early Days ===
Nemesis was formed in the summer of 1999. Most of the band members had just finished high school and had a lot of spare time in their hands. Saber & Reeshad brought Maher Khan and Yawar Mehboob together to form a band that he wanted to manage. Maher asked his brother Sabin Todamol to play bass setting up as a three piece band. They first performed at New Year's Eve at a rooftop party that Saber arranged. This is where they met Zohad, a school friend of Reeshad & Maher. Zohad joined the band early 2000.

Sabin left the band early 2000, when Yawar brought in his school friend Nandito and his cousin Ratul to play rhythm and bass for the band. Nemesis was officially formed then. The band gigged the local underground scene as a cover band.

Zohad brought Dio and Omayr to keep the band going when Yawar and Nandito went abroad for their studies in 2002. The band started work on their first album in 2001 and recorded every summer when Yawar and Nandtio were in town. In 2003, Nemesis first single অবচেতন was released on the mixed compilation আগন্তুক II (Agontuk II). This brought Nemesis a record deal with G-Series for their first album.

=== 2004–2005: Onneshon (Explore) ===
Onneshon (Bengali: অন্বেষণ) was recorded partly at Art of Noise studio and at the home studio of Saidus Sumon. The debut album was released in 2005. Yawar left the band in mid 2005 settling in the UK and Nandito settled in Canada shortly after the album was released. Subsequently, Dio and Omayr joined as permanent members.

With the release of "ধূসর ভাবনা (Gray Idea)" (2006) and "জয়ধ্বনি (Peals of Victory)" the following year, Nemesis also received mainstream recognition as the singles went on to be included in the Radio Foorti Top 100 Singles of 2006, 2007 & 2008. The track "মৃত্যুছায়া (Shadow of Death)" also got listed in Radio Foorti's Top Songs of 2010.

During the years following their debut in 2005, Nemesis went on performing in numerous concerts and events that largely promoted social awareness and issues amongst other relevant affairs, including "Say No To Drugs" concert in Gulshan Youth Club (2008), "Save the Children" and "Stand up Against Poverty" concerts in the Dhanmondi Amphitheater (2009), "Vote for Sundarban" concert at the Army Stadium organized by BAMBA (2010).

The band has also appeared in the "Banglalink Music Festival", the series of tribute shows sponsored by BAT. They performed at the International Club, the American Club and Aurum's New Years event at The Radisson, December 2009.

=== 2006–2011: Tritio Jatra ===
The band recorded their second album Tritio Jatra (Bengali: তৃতীয় যাত্রা) six years later. The first single from the album, "Kobe" (pronounced kôbe) was released in Radio stations earlier in the 2011. They recorded the album in Bengal Studio. In June 2011 they finished recording and mastering the whole album. They managed a record deal with Deadline music (DLM).In late 2011, they released the music video of "Kobe". The music video was produced by Studio Bangi and was premiered at "The Bench" on 4 November 2011.The album was launched at Café 33 in Bailey Road on 23 November.

In mid 2012, members Maher Khan and Omayr Khan left Nemesis, for personal reasons. Zerif Ahmed and Zeheen Ahmed, sons of Manam Ahmed of band Miles, were brought in to replace them.

Tritio Jatra got nominated for The Best Band Award of 2011 (Popular Choice and Critic), for The Best Sounding Album Award and For Best Music Video Award (Song: kobe. Under Studio Bangi) in Citycell Channel I Music Awards. On 27 February 2013, Nemesis won The Best Band Award of 2011 under Critic choice.

=== 2012–2015: social activism ===
In 2013 Nemesis performed in a charity concert arranged by Bangladesh International Recovery Developments for street children. Half of the money was donated to Savar victims.

In the same year, Nemesis bought in Zafir Huq and Nemesis played their new song "Ghuri" at RockNation III with the new lineup. The response they received led them to record the song and release it as their single. They also released a video for it in which they played live. In 2015, they played another song at Rocknation VI called "Ke Jane Ke Bojhey". In 2016, they released it as a single via the Robi Yonder Music App. It was different from their previous singles as it had a more bluesy vibe than its predecessors. Before the recording, Zerif left the band to study in Malaysia. To fill his position, Nemesis brought in Sultan Rafsan Khan from the groove/thrash metal band Minerva. They told their fans via Instagram and Facebook that they had started recording a new album. They released snippets from the album and its title via Zohad's Instagram.

=== 2016–2017: Gonojowar ===
The new album is called Gonojowar (Bengali: গণজোয়ার). It was released on 10 May 2017 after six years. The album can be streamed in iTunes and spotify. On 20 January 2018, they performed at a charity concert for the Rohingyas at Sir John Wilson School in Dhaka, called Salvation.

=== 2019–2025: VIP ===
After an eight-year gap following Gonojowar, Nemesis released their fourth studio album, VIP, on May 23, 2025. The band spent several years recording the 10-track album, much of which was shaped by the social reflections and personal introspection following the global pandemic. The lead singles, "Ghour" and "Bhanga Ayna", were released in 2023 and 2024 to build anticipation for their return. The album features a lineup consisting of Zohad Reza Chowdhury (vocals/guitar), Sultan Rafsan Khan (lead guitar), Ifaz Abrar Reza (guitar), Raquibun Nabi Ratul (bass), and Jeffrey Ovijit Ghosh (drums). Following its launch, the band embarked on a nationwide tour, reclaiming their spot at the top of the Bangladeshi rock scene with a sound that critics noted as being significantly more mature and gritty than their previous work.

== Members ==
Present

- Zohad Reza Chowdhury – lead vocals (2000–Present)
- Ifaz Abrar Reza - Guitars (2022–present)
- Sultan Rafsan Khan – guitar (2016–present)
- Raquibun Nabi Ratul – bass guitar (1999–present)
- Dio Haque – drums (2004–present)
- Jeffrey Ovijit Ghosh - drums (2023-present)
- Farhan Masud Niloy - Guitars (2025–present)

Past

- Saber Z – manager (1999–2001)
- Reeshad R (1999–2001)
- Faria Ibrahim (Farja) – keyboards, vocals (1999–2001)
- Fariza Ibrahim – keyboards, backing vocals (1999–2001)
- Sabin Khan – bass guitars (1999–2001)
- Yawar Mehboob – drums (1999–2005)
- Nandito Noor – guitars (1999–2005)
- Maher Khan – guitars, vocals (1999–2012)
- Omayr Khan – guitars (2001–2012)
- Zeheen Ahmed – guitars, vocals (2012–2013)
- Zerif Ahmed – guitars (2012–2015)
- Zafir Huq – guitar (2013–2022)

== Discography ==
=== Albums ===
- Onneshon (2006)
- Tritio Jatra (2011)
- Gonojowar (2017)
- VIP (2025)

=== EPs ===
- Quarantine Sessions (2020)

=== Singles ===
- Dhushor Bhabna
- Ghuri
- Ami
- Konodin
- Tumi, Ami O Bhor

=== Music videos ===
Year	Title	
2006	"Biborno Srostha"	
2011	"Kobe"	
2014	"Ghuri"	
2017	"Shopnoshur"	"Tomar Kotha Shune"
2018	"Janala"	
