= Vibe (Bangladeshi band) =

Heavy metal/alternative rock band

Vibe ভাইভ
- Origin: Dhaka, Bangladesh
- Genres: Heavy Metal, Alternative Rock
- Years active: 2001–2008
- Labels: G-Series
- Members: Shuddho Fuad Sadi; Oni Hasan; Saber Ahmed Khan; Sabbir Hossain Turjo; Wali Muhammad Akbar

Vibe was a heavy metal/alternative rock band from Dhaka, Bangladesh. It was formed in 2001 but has been inactive since 2007.

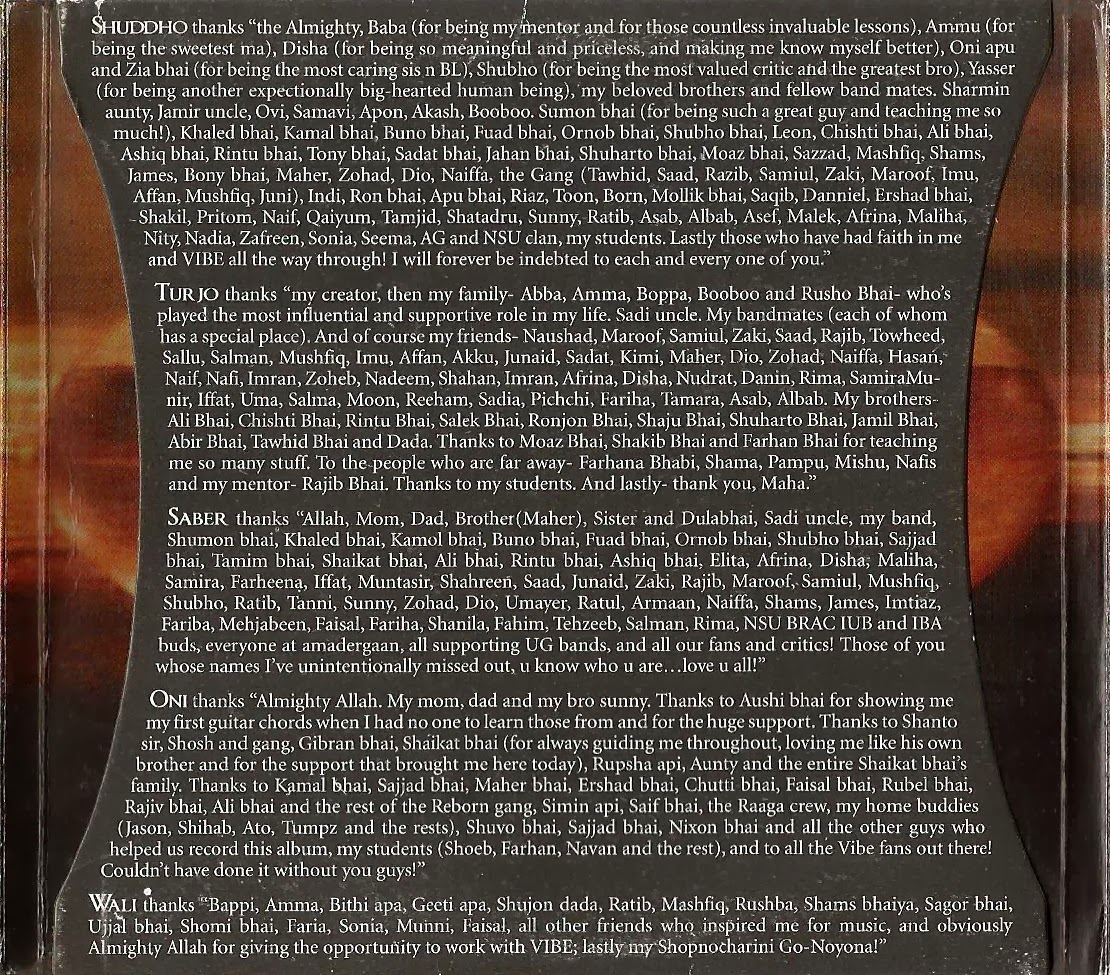
Chena Jogot (Inset-2)

== History and albums ==
Vibe was formed in 2001, in Dhaka, Bangladesh.

The founding members of Vibe were Shuddho Fuad Sadi, Sabbir Hossain Turjo, Mahjuj Jasim Sourav, Isteaque Ahmed , Saber Ahmed Khan and Wali Muhammad Akbar. In 2002, Mahjuj Jasim Sourav left Vibe. Tanvir took over Sourav's place in 2003. In 2004, the band recruited Mashfiq, just after Tanvir left. The final line-up of Vibe was-

- Shuddho Fuad Sadi (vocals/guitars)
- Sabbir Hossain Turjo (drums)
- Saber Ahmed Khan (bass)
- Saleh Hasan Oni (guitars)
- Wali Muhammad Akbar (keyboards)

In 2003, their first track was released in mixed album "Agontuk 1". This album also contained tracks from bands like Aurthohin, Artcell, Black, Cryptic Fate and Poizon Green.

In 2007, a few weeks before Eid, Vibe introduced their first full-length album, Chena Jogot, on the G Series label. This album contains 11 tracks.

Serial	Track	Duration
1	Shopnodeb	03:37
2	Shesher Opashey	04:39
3	Bidhatari Rongey Aka	05:56
4	Chena Jogot	04:27
5	Odhora	04:43
6	Mone Pore	04:19
7	Ashar Prodip Jele	05:14
8	Urey Chole Jaey	04:21
9	Amar Shongbidhan	06:57
10	Obak Shob Shopno	04:41
11	Nostalgia	05:14

In 2007, Vibe won Citycell-Channel i Music Award for Best Band. Vibe performed their last big show in 2008, at Mohakhali, Dhaka. After releasing its debut album, the band became inactive, though they performed regularly from 2001 to 2008. In 2008, their track "Otripto Pran" was released in the compilation album Underground 2.
