= Cryptic Fate =

Bangladeshi heavy metal band

Cryptic Fate ক্রিপ্টিক ফেট
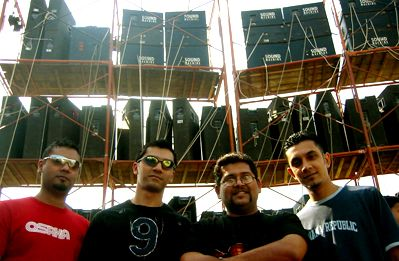
- Cryptic Fate in 2004

Background information
- Origin: Dhaka, Bangladesh
- Genres: Progressive metal; heavy metal (early)
- Years active: 1993-present
- Labels: Soundtek; Qinetic Music; G-Series
- Members: Shakib Chowdhury; K. Sarfaraz Latifullah; Farhan Samad; Jeffrey Ovijit Ghosh
- Past members: Iresh Zaker; Waheduzzaman Khan; Farshed Mahmud; Raef al Hasan Rafa

Cryptic Fate (Bengali: ক্রিপ্টিক ফেট) is a Bangladeshi heavy metal band formed in 1993 in Dhaka. They are one of the pioneer bands of Bangladeshi heavy metal music. Since 1993, they have released four studio albums, several singles and compilation albums. The original lineup consisted of singer Iresh Zaker, guitarists K. Sarfaraz Latifullah and Waheduzzaman Khan, bassist Shakib Chowdhury and drummer Farshed Mahmud.

Although they started as a heavy metal band, they transitioned to progressive metal with their second album. Their first studio album, "Ends are Forever", was released in 1995. Their second studio album, "শ্রেষ্ঠ" (Shrestho, lit. The Greatest), an album about the Liberation War of Bangladesh, was released in 2001. In 2006, they released "দানব" (Danob, lit. Monster), their third full-length effort. They released their fourth full-length studio album "নয় মাস" (Noy Maas, lit. Nine Months) in 2024.

== History ==
=== Formation and early days (1993) ===
In February 1993, Wahed and Sarfaraz conceived the idea of forming a metal band. They quickly recruited school friends Shakib, Farshed and Iresh as Bassist, Drummer, and Vocalist, respectively, and the original line-up was complete. Shakib named the band Cryptic Fate. As the story uncovers in a podcast, Shakib was praying tarawih when the name came to him.

The original line-up was Iresh Zaker on vocals, Waheduzzaman Khan and K. Sarfaraz Latifullah on guitars. Fazle Shakib on bass and Farshed Mahmud on drums.

Frustrated by the lack of concert opportunities, the band turned to composing. Shakib came up with the riff for Fate's first song "Captors of Fate". Farshed writes the lyrics and names the song. A demo was recorded in Farshed's living room, which received lukewarm reviews from listeners. Farshed subsequently leaves for US and the band again considers calling it quits. Farshed insists he will return in a year to record a full-length album, and the band agreed to stay together.

=== "Ends Are Forever" (1994-1995) ===
As promised, Farshed returned to Dhaka for summer vacation and the band began writing their first album. Within a month, the band had eight songs ready. Fate enters Soundgarden Studios in July and starts recording at breakneck speed. It takes only nine shifts to record and mix nine songs. Ends Are Forever was released by Soundtek Productions and enjoyed moderate success despite being an all-English metal album in a pop-saturated all-Bangla market. Farshed returned to the US, soon to be joined by Wahed. Meanwhile, Shakib and Sarfaraz enrolled at Independent University of Bangladesh (IUB), Dhaka, where they later meet guitarist Farhan Samad.

In December, and after a long hiatus from the stage, Cryptic Fate performed at the ICMA Auditorium. The performance brings the house down. In the audience are future guitarist of Artcell, Ershad, and future drummer of The Watson Brothers, Arafat.

=== "শ্রেষ্ঠ (Greatness)" (2002) ===
First solo concert, PG Auditorium. Cryptic Fate opens with their title track “Ends Are Forever” and goes on to perform the entire album, in addition to a slew of covers. The audience goes wild and the concert is a rousing success. Summer, second album. Once again, Fate returns to Soundgarden Studios. Mobin returns as sound engineer supreme. The album recorded is titled Sreshtho – Cryptic Fate's first Bangla album. Sreshtho line-up: Drums – Farshed Guitars – Wahed Guitars – Sarfaraz Vocals/Bass – Shakib The rest of the year the band searches, unsuccessfully, for a production company to release the album. Fate is told metal is out of season. Meanwhile, copies of Sreshtho are leaked to fans and quickly garner lavish praise from underground listeners.

Lacking a second guitar player, Shakib and Sarfaraz invite Farhan to audition for the band. With a guest drummer on board, Cryptic Fate performs at Agargaon Community Center. Impressed by Farhan's skills, Shakib asks Farhan to join the band (12 July) and Farhan duly obliges. The band is offered a concert at the end of July, but Sarfaraz suddenly leaves for the US for higher studies. Emon (from Jolly Rogers) auditions as lead guitarist but falls short of expectations. Farhan steps in as lead guitarist for the show. His performance is stellar and the band delivers yet another tight set. The band performs two more shows during the year with help from Gibran (Dethrow) and Rinku as support guitarists.

Cryptic Fate continued to perform at concerts. Sarfaraz returns to Dhaka. Arafat (The Watson Brothers) joins the band as guest drummer. The highlight of the year is an open-air concert at RAOWA Club where Fate performs only two songs (due to time constraints). One of the songs is “Nisshongo”, a single from Sreshtho, and members of Black, Artcell, Dethrow and others, join the band on stage for a memorable performance.

=== Mixed albums and shows (2001–2004) ===
Cryptic Fate received sponsorship from Pepsi. Sarfaraz temporarily leaves the band for personal reasons. The band performs a concert at the Army Stadium where they introduce new drummer, Turjo. Close to year-end, Fate is invited by Duray to contribute a song to the mixed album Charpatra. Shakib and Farhan collaborate for the first time, and the result is “Cholo Bangladesh” – a cricket anthem that goes on to become Fate's first mainstream hit. Charpatra line-up: Bass/Vocals – Shakib Guitars – Farhan Drums – Turjo

Buoyed by the success of Charpatra, Duray decided to produce another mixed album Anushilon, and invited Fate to contribute two songs. The band once again finds itself without a drummer (Turjo is busy with studies). Left with no choice, Farhan and Shakib play drums on “Shokal Choita” and “Eito Cholchey”, respectively. On a more positive note, Sarfaraz returns to the band, composing “Eito Cholchey”. A full four years after it was recorded, Sreshtho finally sees light of day, thanks to the band's new label G-Series. The album is an instant hit.

Farshed returns to Bangladesh. The first show of the re-united Cryptic Fate is at the Russian Culture Center in March. More shows follow, notably the “ABC” concert at Army Stadium, where Fate unites with Black and Artcell to perform Dream Theater's “Scenes from a Memory”, and Metallica's “Master of Puppets”. The band releases two more singles “Biday” and "Prem" for the Agontuk mixed album series.

=== "দানব (The Beast)" (2004–2006) ===
Cryptic Fate spent the next two years writing and recording Danob. The band takes their time delivering their much-anticipated follow-up to Sreshtho. After the release of the mixed album Chharpotro, Artcell and Black both had their debut albums released in 2002 which took the country by storm. Fate released Sreshto in the same year however the members weren’t satisfied with their sound since it was recorded way back in 1997. They started working on Danob with the purpose to prove themselves to everyone what they were capable of. Released in 2006, the result was a very heavy, progressive metal album which was acclaimed very well. Their sound and compositions were more mature than their earlier works. Listeners also say that Tool was a big inspiration for the making of this album.

=== "নয় মাস (Nine Months)" (2013–2024) ===
In 2013, Cryptic Fate began working on Noy Maash (“Nine Months”), a concept album inspired by the emotions and experiences of the nine months of the Bangladesh Liberation War. The band initially planned to release one song each month, completing a total of nine songs. However, after releasing six tracks, the project was put on hold. In 2024, Cryptic Fate re-recorded the entire album, including the first six songs, and released it as a complete record.

The lineup for the album featured Shakib Chowdhury on bass and vocals, Farhan Samad and K. Sarfaraz Latifullah on guitar, and Raef Al Hasan Rafa on drums. The album was produced and mixed by Farhan Samad and mastered by AK Ratul. Shortly after the release, drummer Raef Al Hasan Rafa departed from the band, and Jeffrey Ovijit Ghosh joined Cryptic Fate as the new drummer.

== Band members ==
=== Present members ===
- Shakib Chowdhury – vocals, bass guitars (1993–present)
- K. Sarfaraz Latifullah – lead guitars (1993–present)
- Farhan Samad – rhythm guitars (1998–present)
- Jeffrey Ovijit Ghosh – drums (2023–present)
- Asif - Keyboard & Backing Vocals (2022–present)

=== Past members ===
- Iresh Zaker – vocals (1993–1994)
- Waheduzzaman Khan – guitars (1993–1997)
- Farshed Mahmud - drums (1993-2013)
- Raef al hasan Rafa – drums (2013–2023)

== Discography ==
=== Studio albums ===
- "Ends Are Forever" (1995)
- "শ্রেষ্ঠ (Greatness)" (2002)
- "দানব (The Beast)" (2006)
- "নয় মাস (Nine Months)" (2024)

=== Singles and mixed album tracks ===
- "Ethernal" (Unreleased) (1997)
- "চলো বাংলাদেশ (Cholo Bangladesh)" (Charpotro) (2001)
- "সকাল ছয়টা (Shokal Choyta)" (Onushilon) (2002)
- "অধিকার (Odhikar)" (Projonmo) (2003)
- "এইতো চলছে (Eito Cholchey)" (Projonmo) (2003)
- "বিদায় (Biday)" (Agontuk) (2003)
- "আশীর্বাদ (Ashirbaad)" (Din Bodol) (2004)
- "গন্তব্য (Gontobbo)" (Lokayoto) (2004)
- "প্রেম (Prem)" (Agontuk 2) (2004)
- "অনাদরের সন্তান (Onadorer Shontan)" (Agontuk 3) (2005)
- "কৃতিত্ব (Krititto)" (Live Now) (2007)
- "ভবঘুরে (Bhoboghurey)" (Re-recorded) (2022)
- "কুশিয়ারা (Kushiara)" (Nodi Rocks) (2022)
