= Bay of Bengal (band) =

Bay of Bengal বে অফ বেঙ্গল
- Origin: Chittagong, Bangladesh
- Genres: Experimental rock
- Years active: 2010–present
- Labels: Mushroom Entertainment Label; Tint; Aajob Records
- Members: Bakhtiar Hossain; Rakibul Nipu; Ahtesham Abid; Abid Pasha; Jamilur Rahman Jamee

Bay of Bengal is a Bangladeshi experimental rock and metal band formed in Chittagong on 26 December 2010. The band released its debut album, Nirob Durvikkho, in 2016. Bay of Bengal is known for incorporating flute melodies and keyboard-driven arrangements into its music.

== History ==
The band formed on 26 December in 2010. Their first album Nirob Durvikkho has 10 songs, which released on 20 February 2016. Till 2015, they worked on 17 songs. Among those they selected 10 songs for their first album. They made their first music video of the song "Je Sohore Ami Nei" from the album.

== Discography ==
- নীরব দুর্ভিক্ষ (Nirob Durvikkho) (2016)
- ঘুম (Ghum) (2017)
- জ্যোৎস্নার স্নান (Jochhona Snan) (2019)
- বিষণ্ণতার গান (Bishonnotar Gaan) (2020)

== Members ==
- Bakhtiar Hossain - lead vocals, rhythm guitar, flutes
- Rakibul Nipu - lead guitar
- Ahtesham Abid - bass guitar
- Jamilur Rahman Jamee - keyboards
- Abid Pasha - drums
