= Saidus Salehin Khaled Sumon =

Bangladeshi singer-songwriter

- সাইদুস সালেহীন খালেদ সুমন
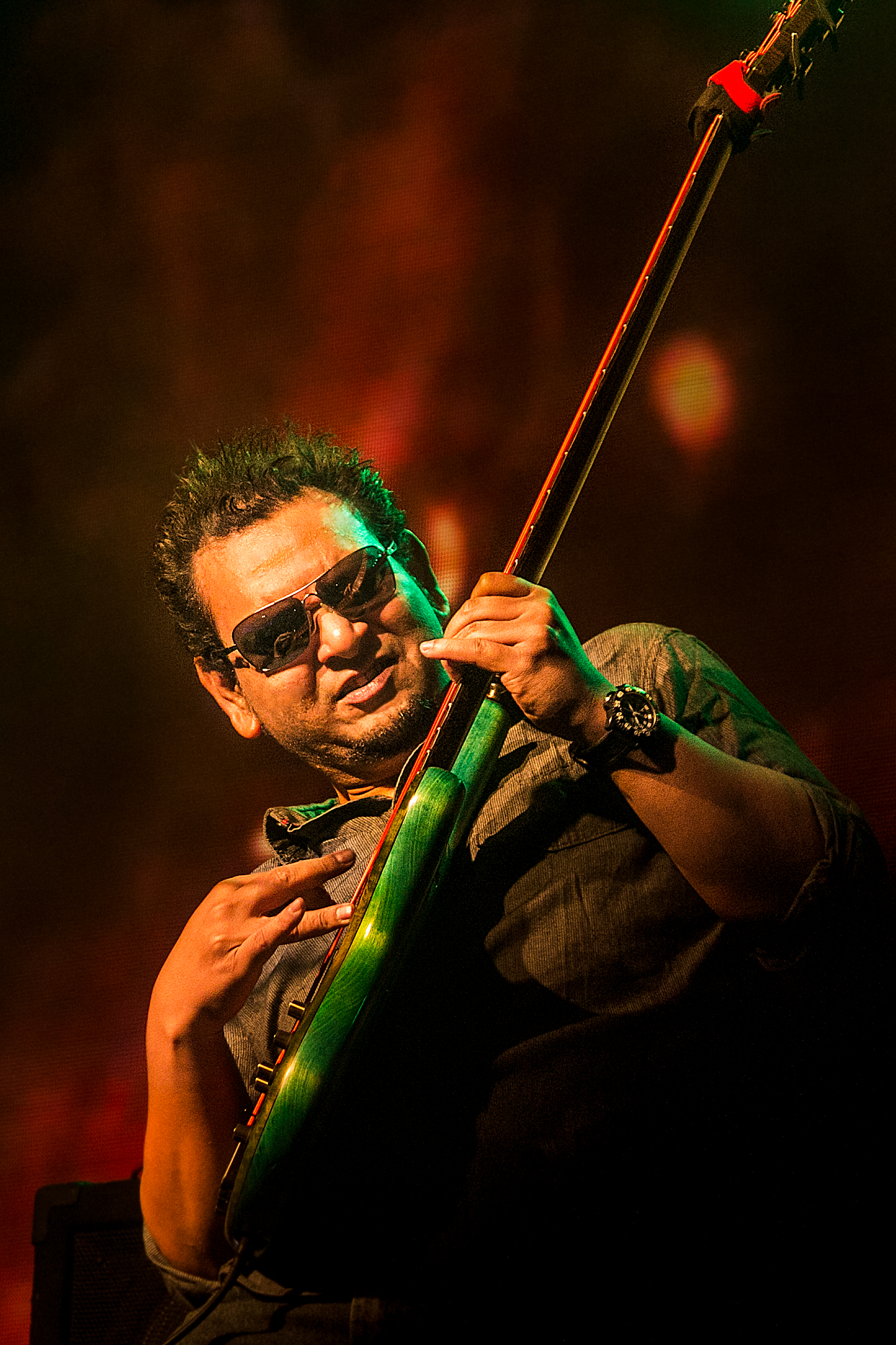
- Sumon performing at RockNation VI: Resurrection in 2015
- Born: 8 January 1973 (age 53); Dhaka, Bangladesh
- Other name: BassBaba Sumon
- Occupations: Singer-songwriter, bass player, record producer, actor, entrepreneur
- Years active: 1990–present
- Height: 6’1 ft
- Children: 2
- Musical career
- Genres: Heavy metal; progressive metal; hard rock; alternative metal
- Instruments: Vocals; bass; guitar; keyboards
- Labels: G-Series; Laser Vision; M.E. Label; Independent
- Member of: Aurthohin
- Formerly of: Warfaze; Nagar Baul
- Website: aurthohin.com

Saidus Salehin Khaled Sumon (born 8 January 1973), popularly known by his nickname Bassbaba Sumon, is a Bangladeshi rock singer-songwriter, bass player, composer, music producer and founder of the Bangladeshi rock band Aurthohin. He is the band leader and spokesperson of Aurthohin since the beginning. He is mostly known for his slapping and tapping style in bass playing and is considered to be the most influential and greatest bassist in the country.

Sumon was born and raised in Dhaka. He started learning bass by himself at the age of 14. He first auditioned for rock band Feelings (Nagar Baul) in 1990 at the age of 16 and joined the band that year. He had played in 11 bands by the age of 19. In 1996, he joined Warfaze and later appeared in the band's 1998 hit album "অসামাজিক (Antisocial)" and left the band. In 1997, his first solo album "সুমন ও অর্থহীন (Sumon and Aurthohin)" was released while he was in Warfaze. Later, after leaving Warfaze, he formed Aurthohin (অর্থহীন).

His style of playing bass and success in music has earned him the title "Bassbaba" (Father of Bass). According to the website labella, Sumon has single-handedly changed the role of bass guitar in Bangladeshi rock music.

== Early life ==
Sumon was born in 1973 in Dhaka, Bangladesh to Nazmul Ahsan Khaled and Shamsun Nahar Khaled. He started playing Hawaiian guitar at the age of 7. In an interview, Sumon stated that he was unable to buy a Spanish guitar, so he took his Hawaiian guitar to a shop and converted it into a Spanish guitar. He picked up his first Spanish guitar and formed his first band when he was 12. One day he was seeing an Iron Maiden show on TV. He was heavily inspired by Steve Harris. Since then, he started playing the bass guitar. He was 14. He joined one of the most popular bands in Bangladesh 'Feelings' as a bassist when he was 16 where he played with Faruq Mahfuz Anam, commonly known as James. He did the first ever unaccompanied bass solo in Bangladesh when he was 17.

== Career ==
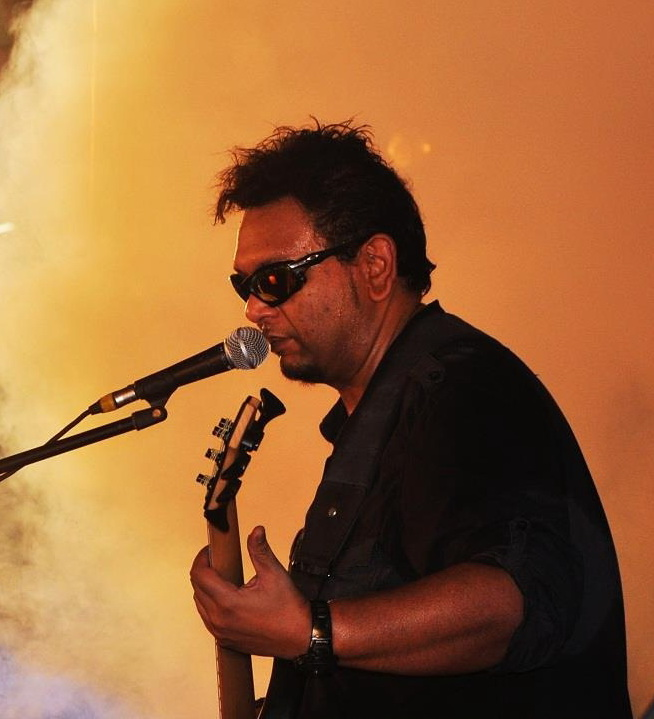
Sumon in 2012

Sumon played with 11 bands by the age of 19. He also wrote, sang, and produced his first solo album when by that time. He is known for his nice grooves, excellent use of different bass playing techniques, and, mostly, for his frequent bass solos in his band Aurthohin's songs.

Bangladesh is a country where rock music, especially metal and alternative rock, is getting popular and Bassbaba Sumon is credited as one of the few most influential artists in this sector. He has influenced the role of bass guitar in Bangladeshi Music. Bassbaba Sumon is a key figure in promoting rock music and bass guitar in Bangladesh.

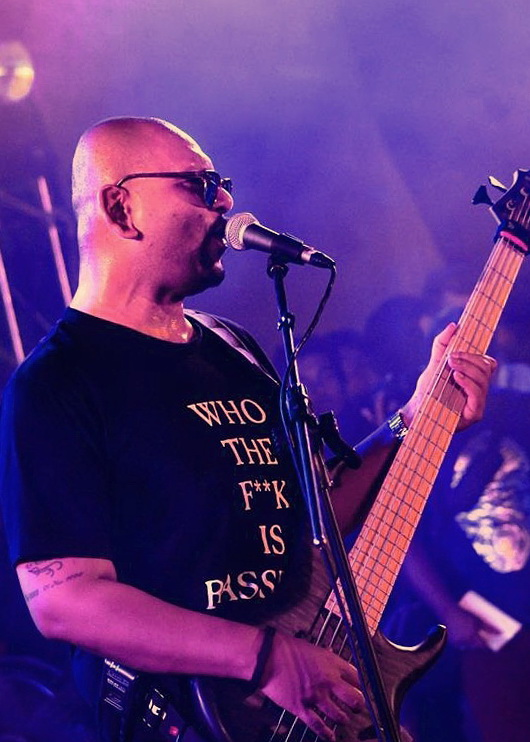
Sumon in 2014

In 2016, he released his first solo bass album named Soul Food Part 1. In the album, Sumon collaborated and featured world-renowned musicians, the likes of Felix Pastorius, Robert "Bubby" Lewis, Josh Cohen, Bob Franceschini, J.D. Blair and Erfan Nazem Zadeh. Talented Bangladeshi drummer Mark Don is also featured in one of the tracks.

== Influence and playing styles ==
Sumon has cited Steve Harris as his primary influence for switching to bass from guitar. He was also inspired by various funk bassists such as Victor Wooten, Billy Sheehan and Stuart Ham. He mostly plays with slapping and tapping. His slapping technique helped Aurthohin bring funky sound. His notable solos are - Shaat Din, Guti (The Finale), Surjo 2, Nirbodh, Nikkrishto 3, Punorjonmo (Guti-5), Cancer Casserole, Better Call Salt & The Walking Bread, Tapping Tempura, etc.

== Illness and recovery ==
After the release of Aurthohin's fourth album, Dhrubok, Sumon's health deteriorated. In 2011, it was announced that he had a spine and stomach cancer. After surgery and chemotherapy, Sumon was pronounced cancer-free in 2013. He also suffered from skin cancer and a brain tumour. He wrote a song about his illness, "Cancer", which appeared on Aushomapto 2. Later, cancer came back several times, but he recovered. Sumon also had a road accident and broke several bones including some discs. He also had a stroke and the left side of his body was paralysed for almost 2 months but eventually, he recovered. In his life, he had to go through a total of 36 surgeries. After four years of break, he came back with his band Aurthohin on 17 December 2021 in front of 35,000 people. People cried after seeing him performing again. Aurthohin became one of the most respected and popular bands in Bangladesh in 2022. He also released a single called "Boyosh holo Amar".

== Personal life ==
Sumon is an entrepreneur. He is the director of the Khaled Group of Companies as well as over 20 well-known companies in Bangladesh.

Sumon has been married to Nazia Salehin Khaled since 1996, who sang with him on his tribute album for John Denver. (Methopoth, shopner daar and bohudure). He has two children named Ahnaf Salehin Khaled and Aurora Salehin Khaled. Both of his children sang with him on his album Boka Manushta when they were only 9 and 3 years old.. He also has three siblings. Shamsul Arefin Khaled (elder brother), Saiful Arefin Khaled (younger brother) wrote half of the hit "Odbhut shei chheleti" while thinking of Bassbaba, as per Kishor alo magazine, also wrote some other songs of Aurthohin, Shahina Khaled (sister).

Sumon is a landscape photographer.

== Discography ==
Solo albums

- "সুমন ও অর্থহীন (Sumon and Aurthohin)" (1997)
- "স্বপ্নগুলো তোমার মতো (The Dreams are Like You)" (2001)
- "মেঘের দেশে (In the Country of Clouds)" (2005)
- "সুমন ও অর্থহীন-২: বোকা মানুষটা (Sumon and Aurthohin-2: The Foolish Man)" (2007)
- Soul Food: Part One (2016)

Collaborated albums

- "এখন আমি (Now Me)" ft. Fuad al Muqtadir and Anila (2007)

Warfaze

- "অসামাজিক (Antisocial)" (1998)

Aurthohin

- "ত্রিমাত্রিক (Three-Dimensional)" (2000)
- "বিবর্তন (Evolution)" (2001)
- "নতুন দিনের মিছিলে (New Day Procession)" (2002)
- "ধ্রুবক (Constant)" (2003)
- "অসমাপ্ত (Unfinished)" (2008)
- "অসমাপ্ত ২ (Unfinished II)" (2011)
- "ক্যান্সারের নিশিকাব্য (Cancer Er Nishikabya)" (2016)
- "ফিনিক্সের ডায়েরী ১ (Phoenixer Diary 1)" (2022)
- "ফিনিক্সের ডায়েরী ২ (Phoenixer Diary 2)" (2025)
- Singles:
  - Kokhono (Tarader Gunjone) (1999)
  - Jodi Kobhu (6 Band, '99) (1999)
  - Anubhobe (Jewel with the Stars)
  - Notun Ami (Jewel with the Stars)
  - Ektu Ghum (Rock with Radiomania)
  - Olotpalot (Bappa with Rockers)
  - Valo Lage Na (Bappa with Rockers)
  - Aaj Eshechhi (Coming Back to Life) (2011)
  - Protichhobi 2012 (Online Release) (2012)
  - Maa (Online Release) (2013)
  - Chador (Online Release) (2013)
  - Amjonota (Online Release) (2013)
  - Kothay Tumi (Online Release) (2014)
  - Walter White (Online Release)
  - Hridoyer Smrititgulo (Online Release) (2014)
  - Purano Sei Diner Kotha (Online Release) (2016)
  - Oniyomer Golpo (Sumon Featuring Furti) (Online Release) (2018)
  - Prothom (Film- Unoponchash Batash) (2020)
  - Boyosh Holo Amar (Online Release) (2021)
  - Amar E Gaan (online Release) (2022)

== See also ==
- Artcell
- Cryptic Fate
