= Aurthohin =

Bangladeshi rock band

Aurthohin অর্থহীন
- Origin: Dhaka, Bangladesh
- Genres: Djent; metalcore; heavy metal; punk rock; groove metal; alternative metal; hard rock; folk
- Years active: 1998–present
- Labels: G-Series; Mushroom Entertainment
- Members: Saidus Sumon
- Past members: Raef al Hasan Rafa; Ibrahim Ahmed Kamal; Shishir Ahmed; Minhajuddin Ahmed; Muntasir Mamun; Rumi Rahman; Russel Rahman; Mahaan Faheem; Zahin Rashid; Mark Don; Ehtesham Ali Moeen
- Website: aurthohin.com

Aurthohin (Bangla: অর্থহীন) is a Bangladeshi rock band formed in Dhaka in 1998 by Saidus Sumon (vocals and bass guitar), Tonmoy Rahman (lead guitar), Ponir (rhythm guitar), and Rumi Rahman (drums and percussion). They are considered to be one of the pioneering bands in Bangladeshi alternative rock music. The band was seen as revolutionary within the rock scene in Bangladesh and played a huge part promoting rock/metal music in the country by supporting underground rock/metal bands in Bangladesh. They have released 9 studio albums and also have appeared in some mixed albums. Though they were formed as a rock band, they have experimented with genres like progressive metal and groove metal. Sumon's interests in slap bass also led the band's sound into funk-rock. Aurthohin currently holds a lineup of Saidus Khaled Sumon (bass), Sheikh M. Reaz (Guest Drummer), Shishir Ahmed (Guitars,Keyboards) and Adnan Atique (Keyboard, Guitar).

After signing with G-Series, they released their debut studio album, Trimatrik, on 7 October 2000. The following album Biborton, released on 10 December 2001, was more positively reviewed and gained more success than the previous one. The band released several hit songs in the 2000s like Adbhut Shei Cheleti (2000), Amar Proticchobi (2001), Hoytoba (2003), Anmone (2008) and Nikrishto (2008). Their most commercially successful album Aushomapto 2 was released on 7 October 2011 by ME Label. Their sound was drawn from variety of musical influences including alternative, blues and also the country music of John Denver. There were several lineup changes, with Sumon being the only member who remained throughout the band's career.

They have won many accolades including Channel i and Citycell's best band of the year award in 2008 and 2011 respectively.

== History ==
=== Formation and early years (1997–1999) ===
In 1997, Saidus Sumon released a solo album named Sumon o Aurthohin (Sumon and Aurthohin) from G-Series. He was still the bassist of Warfaze. The album featured bass and vocals by Sumon and some guest artists. The track 6 of the album Aurthohin (Meaningless) featured 8 prominent guitarist of that era playing a collection of 27 guitar solos. The vocals of the song was done by Sunjoy of Warfaze. He [Sumon] had the idea to form a band of his own from the song "অর্থহীন (Meaningless)". Then in 1998 he formed the band along with Tonmoy Rahman (guitars), Ponir (guitars) and Rumi Rahman (drums).

=== "ত্রিমাত্রিক (Three-Dimensional)" and "বিবর্তন (Evolution)" (1999–2001) ===
In the early 1999, Aurthohin signed a contract with G-Series. They started working on their debut album. The album was released on 7 October 2000. The album featured a confusing line-up of musicians, since Sumon credited both musicians that had left the band and had joined after the album was recorded. According to the sleeve of the album, the line-up included Sumon (lead vocals, bass guitars), Minhajuddin Ahmed Piklu (lead guitars), Russell Rahman (rhythm guitars, vocals) and Rumi Rahman (drums). The album was produced by Iqbal Asif Jewel. It also started a trend of songs that would see sequels in later albums, including the ballad "অদ্ভুত সেই ছেলেটি (That Weird Boy)" and the taunt anthem "গুটি (Pawn)". The album also featured a few acoustic based soft rock numbers such as "আমার না বলা কথা (The Things I Haven't Said)". This album paved the way for Aurthohin for gaining popularity and they also got more huge record deals in the next years.

In February 2001, they signed a new contract with ME Label to release their next album. The album Biborton|বিবর্তন (Evolution) came out in the stores on 10 December 2001. Continuing with the same line-up, the album would grow to be Aurthohin's most critically acclaimed and widely accepted album yet. Featuring the sequels to the numbers "অদ্ভুত সেই ছেলেটি (That Weird Boy)" and "গুটি (Pawn)", it also featured complex guitar and bass solos by the duo that was Piklu and Sumon and mixed in a blend of hard rock numbers intertwined with soft, melodious songs. Popular songs from the album include "গুটি ২ (Pawn II)", "আমার প্রতিচ্ছবি (My Reflections)" and "অদ্ভুত সেই ছেলেটি ২ (That Weird Boy II)", which featured Artcell vocalist George Lincoln as a guest artist. This album was the second album produced by Iqbal Asif Jewel.

=== "নতুন দিনের মিছিলে (New Day Procession)" and "ধ্রুবক (Constant)" (2002–2003) ===
In 2002, Russell Rahman left the band due to differences with frontman Sumon, paving the way for Kronic vocalist Imtiaz to fill in as guest vocalist for one of Aurthohin's most ambitious projects. Featuring the longest song in Bangladeshi rock history, "সাত দিন (Seven Days)", it was released to huge expectations nationwide. Kronic vocalist Imtiaz appeared in the song. It spanned for 28 minutes and 31 seconds long, chronicling the last seven days of an inmate on death row. The album received mixed reviews, some praising the ambitiousness behind "সাত দিন (Seven Days)" but feeling the other songs did not differentiate themselves from the pack. It also featured Apu from Triloy on keyboards.

After the release of "নতুন দিনের মিছিলে (New Day Procession), Imtiaz told the band that he could not do the vocals as a guest members anymore and the band decided not to take any more guest members. Shishir Ahmed (guitars) of DNA joined the band. The band then faced their biggest problem to date when vocalist Sumon got sick and doctors told him he would not be able to sing as he did before. Sumon had to stop singing most of the vocal arrangements, and the band decided to take a new vocalist. Raef al Hasan Rafa, the drummer of Severe Dementia, joined the band as the vocalist and also a drummer. Aurthohin's fourth album, "ধ্রুবক (Constant)" was released in 2003 by G-Series. Most of the album was recorded in Art of Noise Studio, except for the bass guitars of the album which was recorded in Studio Bass. Featuring songs like, "চাইতে পারো (Can Ask)", " একটা গান দাও (Give Me a Song)" and "রঙধনু (Rainbow)", it went on to be one of the year's biggest hit album and received overwhelming positive reviews. It was their third album to be produced and mixed by Iqbal Asif Jewel.

=== Band problems (2004–2006) ===
Shortly after Aurthohin's 4th album "ধ্রুবক (Constant)" was released Sumon's health deteriorated. Due to Sumon's illness the band stopped almost all the gigs. At the end of 2004, longtime guitarist Minhajuddin Ahmed Piklu left the band. Sumon got the affiliation from Michael Tobias Design. In 2005, Sumon's jaw got dislocated. Doctors told him to give up singing permanently. Chances of recovery were very low. Aurthohin stopped all their activities, Sumon and the others were planning to disband. But suddenly things began to change as Sumon was getting well. Aurthohin performed with the same line up until 2006. Ibrahim Ahmed Kamal of Warfaze joined as a guest guitarist. After doing a few gigs Sumon offered him a permanent place which he accepted. Soon after the band started working on their fifth album.

=== "অসমাপ্ত (Unfinished)" and "অসমাপ্ত ২ (Unfinished II)" (2008) ===
After a long break of five years, they released their 5th album "অসমাপ্ত (Unfinished)" in 2008 by G-Series. By the release of the album, it became the biggest hit album of the band featuring songs like "চাইতে পারো ২ (Can Ask II)", "আনমনে (Unheeding)", " গুটি (The Finale)", "নিকৃষ্ট (Inferior)" and "ফিটাস এর কান্না (The Cry of the Fetus)". The lineup of the band changed in this album. Shishir Ahmed became a full-time guitarist and Rafa became a full-time drummer. Ibrahim Ahmed Kamal of Warfaze also joined the band as the guitarist. The album was mixed and produced by Fuad al Muqtadir. All of the songs of the album was recorded at Studio Bass, Clockwork Studio and Hit Factory. The band won the Channel i best band of the year award in 2008 for this album.

Aurthohin released their 6th studio album on 25 November 2011. It contains 11 original tracks including sequels to previous songs 'Shurjo-2', 'Nikkrishto-2', Golper Shuru ('Audbhut Shei Chheleti prequel') and 'Anmonay-2'. Due to illness Kamal could not participate in the whole album. He played in 3 songs. Most of the guitar solos are done by Shishir while Rafa also contributed guitar solos in 3 songs. "Uru Uru Mon", "Anmone-2", "Nikkrishto-2", "Surjo-2" and "Cancer" has been instant hit. All songs except "Uru Uru Mon" are written by Sumon and all tracks composed and produced by Aurthohin. It took them only four days to create the album.

=== After "অসমাপ্ত ২ (Unfinished II)" (2011–2016) ===
Due to illness of Sumon, Aurthohin did not play many concerts in 2012. After a long break they came back with live gigs in early 2013. In the middle of the 2013, Aurthohin announced on their Facebook page that Kamal is no more with the band. On 15 October 2013, they released their new single "Amjonota", that has lyrics about Bangladesh's current events, corruptions, political conflict and other issues. After playing 12 years, Rafa left the band due to his work pressure and schedule clashes with Aurthohin. Mark Don, Drummer of Trainwreck and guitarist of Metal Maze joined as drummer in 2015. They released an official music video of the song called "আলো আর আঁধার (Light and Darkness)" from the previous album. The video was directed by Sumon himself.

=== "ক্যান্সারের নিশিকাব্য (Cancer Nishikabya)" ===
Aurthohin released their 7th studio album, Cancer er Nishikabyo, on 29 June 2016. It was very different from their previous releases also the first album with their new member, Mark. The album features a more darker tone mainly consisting of metalcore and modern progressive metal elements. The album is based on the challenges Sumon faced during his battle with cancer which he is still fighting now.

Nikkrishto 3, the most controversial track according to listeners, on the album, had a lot of backlash during its release due its lyrical content. Sumon however said in a radio interview that it would be a very popular track 3–5 years from the album release.

Most of Nikkrishto 3 was composed by Mark, Punorjonmo(Guti 5) was by Shishir and the title track was a group effort.

"ফিনিক্সের ডায়েরি (Phoenix's Diary)" (2022–present)

[...]

== Musical styles ==
Aurthohin has experimented with various genres over the years. They are known for developing various rock and metal genres in Bangladesh. Sumon used to arrange various music instruments to experiment with genres. He featured growling in his songs along with screaming. Rafa, Imtiaz, Rasel etc. musicians backed up Sumon for growls and screams. Piklu also developed his guitar skills and brought extreme metal tone along with soft melodic tone in their songs. Their musical styles include – soft rock, hard rock, alternative rock/metal, heavy metal, groove metal, thrash metal, progressive rock/metal, funk rock/metal, speed metal, symphonic rock etc. They have had a very wide music genre range, especially in their prime years, from 1998 to 2004.

Their current sound is shaped by Modern Metalcore and Djent. Their last two Albums (Phoenix er Diary 1/2) have been labeled ‘Bangla Nu-rock’ by them which blends these elements with Bengali musical scales, instruments.

== Lyrical theme ==
Aurthohin has written various songs with different themes. Their songs focus on different subjects such as politics, life, love, corruption, narcissism etc. They have written many songs which were released as series focusing on different topics. Such songs are songs like "Guti", "Chaite Paro", "Nikkrishto (worst)", "Audbhut Shei Cheleti (The Weird boy)" and "Surjo (sun)". Guti series songs focus on hypocrisy and narcissism of a powerful man. Audbhut Shei Cheleti tells a story of a messed up boy's life. A song called Amjonata, released in 2013, was about political status of Bangladesh. Sumon also wrote songs about his health issues. A notable song was "Cancer", which tells the story of his cancer life.

== Popularity ==
Over the last decade, Aurthohin managed to pull a huge amount of popularity from Bangladesh's band music industry. After releasing their best selling album Aushomapto II in 2011, their fans started to grow exponentially.

Even though Aurthohin failed to deliver music to their fans consistently after Aushomapto II due to Bassbaba Sumon's health issues, The fans remembered their songs and carried their legacy until they did two comebacks with albums named Cancer er Nishikabbo (2016) and then Phoenix er Diary 1 (2022) and then Phoenix er Diary 2 (2025) which was released exactly 3 years after Phoenix er Diary 1 (2022).

== Members ==
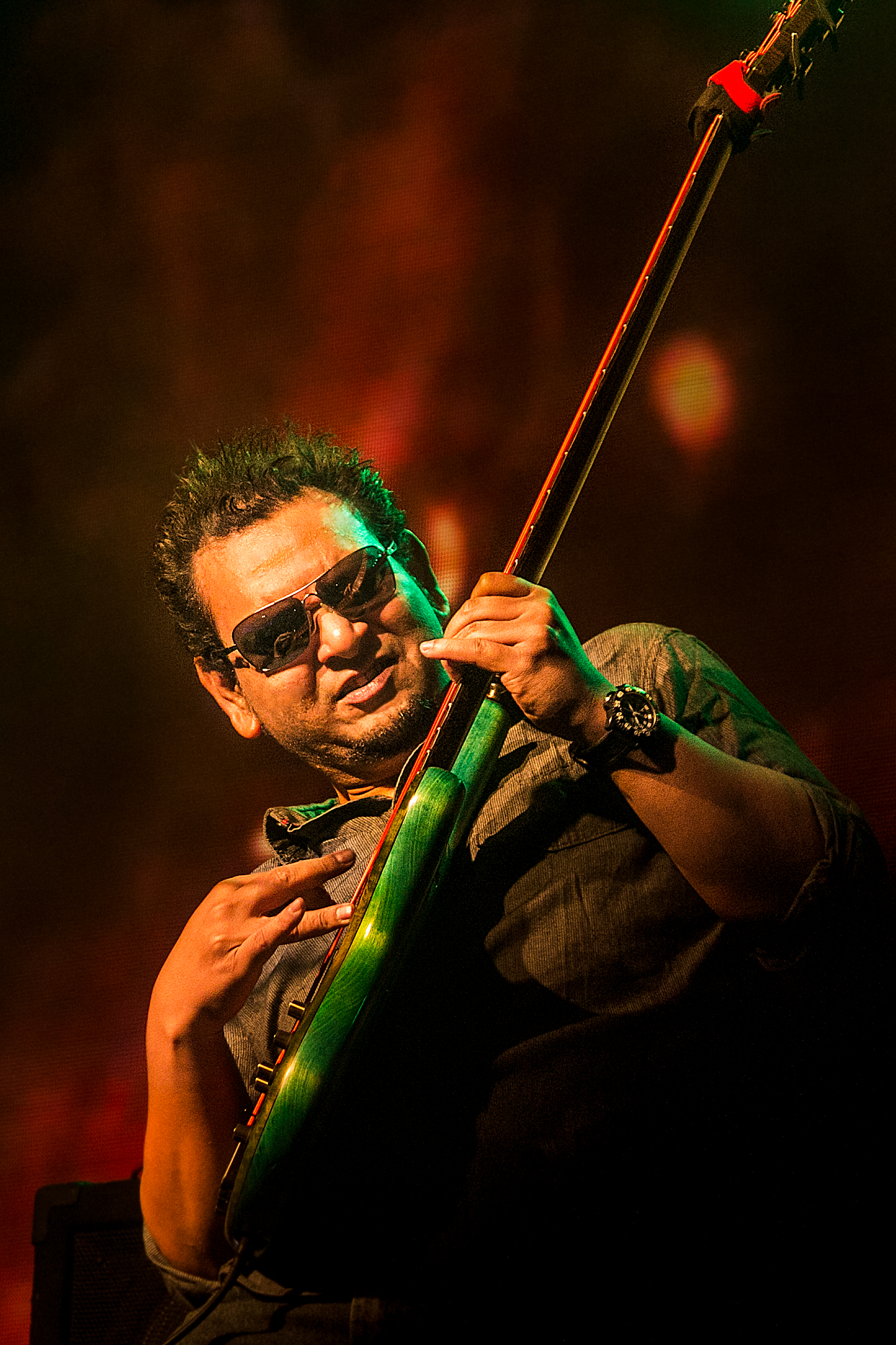
Bassbaba Sumon

=== Present members ===
- Bassbaba Sumon - Vocal, Bass (1998-present)
- Shishir Ahmed - Guitar, Keyboard (2003–2023)(2026-present)
- Adnan Atique - Keyboard, Guitar (2026-present)
- Sheikh M Riaz - Drums, Vocal (2026-present)

=== Past members ===
- Mark Don - Drums, Vocal, Guitar, Keyboards (2015-2026)
- Ehtesham Ali Moeen - Guitar (2024-2026)
- Zahin Rashid - Guitar, Keyboards, Sitar, Flute (2024)
- Mahaan Fahim - Guitar (2017–2024)
- Raef al Hasan Rafa - Drums, Vocal, Guitar (2003–2015)
- Ibrahim Ahmed Kamal - Guitar (2006–2013)
- Muntasir Mamun - Drums (2000–2007)
- Minhaz Ahmed Piklu - Guitar, Vocal (1999–2004)
- Russel Rahman - Vocal, Guitar (1999–2001)
- Shovon - Guitar (1999–2000)
- Hossain Towhidur Rahman Rumi - Drums (1998–2000)
- Tonmoy Rahman - Guitar (1998–1999)
- Ponir - Guitar (1998–1999)

== Discography ==
=== Studio albums ===
- Trimatrik (Three-dimensional) (2000)
- Biborton (Evolution) (2001)
- Notun Diner Michhile (New Day Procession) (2002)
- Dhrubok (Constant) (2003)
- Aushomapto 1 (Unfinished I) (2008)
- Aushomapto 2 (Unfinished II) (2011)
- Cancer er Nishikabyo (Cancer Night Poems) (2016)
- Phoenix er Diary 1 (Diary of the Phoenix 1) (2022)
- Phoenix er Diary 2 (Diary of the Phoenix 2) (2025)

== Videography ==
- নতুন দিনের মিছিলে (New Day Procession)
- সমাধি শহর (Tomb Town)
- অসমাপ্ত (Unfinished)
- চাইতে পারো ২ (Can Ask II)
- শেষ গান (Last Song)
- আলো আর আঁধার (Light and Darkness)
- চাইতে পারো ৩ (Can Ask III)
- কারণ তুমি অমানুষ (Nikkrishto Revisited)
