= G-Series (record label) =

Bangladeshi record label

- Founded: 1983
- Founder: Nazmul Haque Bhuiyan
- Status: Active
- Distributor: Geetanjoly
- Genre: Various
- Country of origin: Bangladesh
- Location: Dhaka, Bangladesh
- Official website: www.gentertainmentbd.club

G-Series is a major Bangladeshi record label. The company produces and publishes cassettes, CDs, VCDs, and DVDs of dramas, telefilms, movies, and music. It is one of the largest such companies in Bangladesh. The owner of the company is Nazmul Haque Bhuiyan, popularly known as Khaled. The Daily Star described it a major record label in Bangladesh.

== History ==
G-Series was established in 1983 by Nazmul Haque Bhuiyan. In 2006, Agniveena production was founded as a sister concern of G-Series. G-series is named after the famous book of poems, Gitanjali of Rabindranath Tagore. In 2007, G-Series was seeing a decline in the sale of compact disks due to piracy.

In 2010, for the Eid market, G-series and Agniveena, its sister concern, released 30 albums. The same year the company partnered with BBC World Service Trust to launch BBC Janala on CD. BBC Janala is a program of the trust, English in action, with an aim of making English lessons more accessible.

In 2011, G-Series partnered with Nescafé to launch Get Set Rock, a talent hunt which was won by S.I.X. G-Series released an album of the winner, S.I.X, and the runner-up, Rang, titled Nescafé 'Get Set Rock.

== Artists ==
=== Musicians ===
- Niaz Mohammad Chowdhury
- Happy Akhand
- Shantanu Biswas
- Sania Sultana Liza
- Robi Chowdhury
- Kishor Palash
- Bassbaba-Sumon
- Fuad Al Muktadir
- Parveen Sultana
- Tahsan Rahman Khan

=== Bands ===
- Aurthohin
- Stoic Bliss
- Shironamhin
- Black
- Artcell
- Nemesis
- Vibe

== Films ==
=== As production company ===
Key
†	Denotes film or TV productions that have not yet been released

Year	Films	Director	Cast	Notes	Ref.
2025	Dodor Golpo †	Reza Ghotok	Symon Sadik, Pori Moni, Monira Mithu	Awaiting for release	

== See also ==
- List of Bangladeshi record labels
