= Shironamhin discography =

Discography

- Studio albums: 6
- EPs: 1
- Singles: 5
- Music videos: Several
- Film Scores: 2
- Mixed albums: 6

The discography of the Bengali independent music band Shironamhin consists of five studio albums, six mixed albums, one EP, two Playback singles albums.

== Albums ==
=== Studio albums ===
Year	Album details	
2004	Jahaji: Released: 1 January 2004; Label: Rabbit Communications G-series; Format: CD, digital download	Track list: 1. Nodee (4:31); 2. Hashimukh (4:14); 3. Shohorer Kotha (3:48); 4. Shubhro Rongin (4:02); 5. Hoy Na (4:08); 6. Laal Neel Golpo (4:26); 7. Nishchup Andhar (4:34); 8. Ghoom (5:10); 9. Shunyo (4:42); 10. Obak Vromon (6:27)
2006	Ichchhe Ghuri: Released: 2006; Label: Format: CD, digital download	Track list: 1. Borsha (5:01); 2. Pakhi (4:15); 3. Cafeteria (4:19); 4. Shodesh (4:02); 5. Bhoboghure Jhor (4:10); 6. Ruposhi Nogor (3:21); 7. Nisshongo (3:23); 8. Onno Kew (5:10); 9. Onek Asha Nea (5:08); 10. Ditio Jibon (6:56)
2009	Bondho Janala: Released: 2009; Label: Format: CD, digital download	Track list: 1. Bondho Janala (4:03); 2. Bhalobasa Megh (4:25); 3. Bullet Kingba Kobita (4:33); 4. Porichoy (3:31); 5. Shurjo (4:40); 6. Eka (4:58); 7. Shohosha Dip (4:28); 8. Bus Stopage (4:22); 9. Shuprovat (5:08); 10. Bangladesh (4:22)
2010	Shironamhin Rabindranath: Released: 2010; Label: Laser Vision; Format: CD, digital download	Track list: 1. Gram Chhara Oi Ranga Matir Poth (4:52); 2. Purano Sei Diner Kotha (3:28); 3. Shangon Gogone (4:36); 4. Phoole Phoole (4:10); 5. Kichhu Bolbo Bole Eshechhilam (3:21); 6. Jete Jete Ekla Pothe (3:46); 7. Swakatore Oi Kadhichhe Sokole (5:31); 8. Tumi Ki Kebol E Chhobi (3:28); 9. Sudhu Tomar Bani Noy Go (4:19)
2013	Shironamhin Shironamhin: Released: 19 July 2013; Label: Incursion Music; Format: CD, digital download	Track list: 1. Aabar Hashimukh (5:39); 2. Brishtikabbyo (5:03); 3. Kichhu Kotha (4:10); 4. Poree (4:38); 5. Rod Canvas (3:55); 6. Shonshon, Jodio Kashbon (4:19); 7. Aahoto Kichhu Golpo(5:07); 8. Michhil (5:13); 9. Chithi (4:01); 10. Aatotayee (6:37)
2022	Perfume: Released: 2022; Label: Pran Potato Crackers; Format: Pen-drive, digital download	Track list: 1. Jadukor (2017); 2. Bohemian (2018); 3. Barud Shomudro (2018); 4. Ei Obelay (2019); 5. Cafeteria Periye (2020); 6. Kashfuler Shohor Dekha; 7. Perfume (2022)

=== Mixed albums ===
Year	Album details	
2006	Shopnochura 2: Released: 1 January 2004; Label: Format: CD, digital download	Track list: 1. Godhuly
2007	Shopnochura 3: Released: 2007; Label: Format: CD, digital download	Track list: 1. Train
2007	Neon Aloy Shagotom: Released: 1 January 2007; Label: G-series; Format: CD, digital download	Track list: 1. Muthophone (4.47)
2008	Bondhuta: Released: 2008; Label: Format: CD, digital download	Track list: 1. Prantor
2008	Rock 101: Released: 2008; Label: Format: CD, digital download	Track list: 1. Coffee House
2012	Joyoddhoni: Released: 2012; Label: Format: CD, digital download	Track list: 1. Bijoy Shopot
2012	Gorje Otho Bangladesh: Released: 2012; Label: Format: CD, digital download	Track list: 1. Buke Thak Bangladesh

=== Playback singles ===
Year	Album details	
2015	Podmo Patar Jol: Released: 2015; Label: G-Series; Format: CD, digital download	Track list: 1. Podmo Patar Jol
2019	Amra Ekta Cinema Banabo: Released: 2019; Label: Impress Telefilm Limited; Format: CD, digital download	Track list: 1. E Raat E

=== Extended play ===
Year	Album
2009	WFP Campaign: Release: 2002; Label: Format: CD
