= List of Dhaka College alumni =

This list of Dhaka College alumni includes notable students who studied or study as intermediate, undergraduate or graduate students at Dhaka College.

Chart of degrees
Intermediate	Bachelor's	Master's
Intermediate of Arts (I.A.) First Examination in Arts (F.A.)	Bachelor of Arts (B.A.)	Master of Arts (M.A.)
Intermediate of Science (I.Sc.)	Bachelor of Science (B.Sc.)	
		Master of Social Science (MSS)
	Bachelor of Law (B.L.)	

== Government and politics ==
Name	Batch	Notability	Notes
Mirza Fakhrul Islam Alamgir	Intermediate	23rd President of Bangladesh	
A. Q. M. Badruddoza Chowdhury	Intermediate 1949	12th President of Bangladesh 2nd Deputy Prime Minister of Bangladesh Former Minister of Foreign Affairs	
Zillur Rahman	I.A. 1947	14th President of Bangladesh	
Tajuddin Ahmad		1st Prime Minister of Bangladesh	
Maumoon Abdul Gayoom		Former President of the Maldives	
A. T. M. Afzal	Intermediate 1952	8th Chief Justice of Bangladesh	
Shah Moazzem Hossain	I.A. 1956	8th Deputy Prime Minister of Bangladesh	
Mustafa Jabbar	Intermediate 1968	Minister of Post, Telecommunications and Information Technology	
Nurul Majid Mahmud Humayun		Minister of Industries	
Tawfiq-e-Elahi Chowdhury	I.Sc. 1961	Power, Energy and Mineral Resources Adviser to the Prime Minister of Bangladesh Bir Bikrom	
M Syeduzzaman	I.Sc. 1951	Former Minister of Finance	
A R Mallick	Intermediate 1936	Former Minister of Finance	
Abu Saleh Mohammad Mustafizur Rahman		Former Minister of Foreign Affairs Former Minister of Home Affairs Former Minister of Commerce	
Abul Hassan Mahmood Ali	I.A. 1959	Former Minister of Foreign Affairs Former Minister of Disaster Management and Relief	
Muhiuddin Khan Alamgir		Former Minister of Home Affairs	
Shafique Ahmed	Intermediate 1955	Former Minister of Law	
Faruk Khan		Former Minister of Commerce Former Minister of Civil Aviation and Tourism	
Mizanur Rahman Shelley	I.A. 1959	Former Minister of Information Former Minister of Water Resources	
Syed Najmuddin Hashim	I.A. 1944	Former Minister of Information	
Rashed Khan Menon	I.A. 1960	Former Minister of Social Welfare Former Minister of Civil Aviation and Tourism	
Abdur Razzaq	Intermediate 1960	Former Minister of Water Resources	
Salehuddin Ahmed	I.Sc. 1965	Adviser for Finance Adviser for Commerce Adviser for Science and Technology Former Adviser for Planning	
Bidhan Ranjan Roy	Intermediate 1981	Adviser for Primary and Mass Education	
Mirza Nurul Huda	I. A. 1937	Vice President of Bangladesh	
A. B. Mirza Azizul Islam		Former Adviser to the caretaker government in charge of Ministry of Finance, Ministry of Commerce, Ministry of Post and Telecommunications and Ministry of Planning	
Akbar Ali Khan	I.Sc. 1961	Former Adviser to the caretaker government in charge of Ministry of Finance, Ministry of Commerce and Ministry of Post and Telecommunications Former Cabinet Secretary Economist and educationist	
Jamilur Reza Choudhury	Intermediate 1959	Former Adviser to the caretaker government in charge of Ministry of Power, Energy and Mineral Resources and Ministry of Water Resources	
Syed Ishtiaq Ahmed	I.A. 1950	Former Adviser to the caretaker government in charge of Ministry of Law, Justice and Parliamentary Affairs, Ministry of Local Government, Rural Development and Co-operatives and Ministry of Civil Aviation and Tourism 3rd Attorney General of Bangladesh	
Anwarul Iqbal	Intermediate 1967	Former Adviser to the caretaker government in charge of Ministry of Local Government, Rural Development and Co-operatives, Ministry of Labour and Employment and Ministry of Textiles and Jute	
A. K. M. Sadeq		6th Chief Election Commissioner of Bangladesh	
Kazi Habibul Awal	Intermediate 1974	13th Chief Election Commissioner of Bangladesh	
Zunaid Ahmed Palak	MSS 2011	Minister of State for Information and Communication Technology Division	
Abu Ahmad Fazlul Karim	I.Sc. 1947	Former Minister of State for Radio, Sports and Culture Former Minister of State for Health and Birth Control Former Member of Parliament	
Dipankar Talukdar	Intermediate 1971	Former Minister of State for Chittagong Hill Tracts Affairs Member of Parliament	
Abdus Sobhan Golap		Member of Parliament	
Mahbubul Alam Hanif		Member of Parliament Joint Secretary of Awami League	
Sajjadul Hassan		Member of Parliament Former Chairman of Biman Bangladesh Airlines Former Senior Secretary at Prime Minister's Office	
Bodruddoza Md. Farhad Hossain	Intermediate 1990	Member of Parliament	
Mujibur Rahman Chowdhury		Member of Parliament	
Shamim Kaisar Lincoln	Intermediate 1997	Former Member of Parliament	
Matruza Hossain Mollah		Former Member of Parliament	
Harunur Rashid		Former Member of Parliament	
Azizur Rahman		Former Member of Parliament	
Moyez Uddin	I.A. 1950	Former Member of Parliament	
Mirza Faisal Amin	I.A. 1950	Former Member of Parliament	
K.M. Hemayet Ullah Auranga		Former Member of Parliament	
Mohammad Elias	I.Sc. 1947	Former Member of Parliament Politician and language activist	
Nur-e-Alam Siddique		Former Member of Parliament	
Kazi Zafarullah		Former Member of Parliament Politician, industrialist and presidium member of Awami League	
Golam Maula Rony		Former Member of Parliament Politician, businessman and writer	
AM Amin Uddin		14th Attorney General of Bangladesh	
Serajul Alam Khan	Intermediate 1958	Former General Secretary of Bangladesh Chhatra League	
Mahmudur Rahman Manna	Intermediate 1968	Former Vice President of Dhaka University Central Students' Union (DUCSU) Former General Secretary of Chittagong University Central Students' Union (CUCSU)	
MA Wadud		Language activist and politician	
Abdul Monem Khan	B.A. 1920	Former Governor of East Pakistan	
Muhammad Ibrahim	Intermediate 1918	Former Minister of Law of Pakistan	
Badruddin Ahmed Siddiky	I.A. 1932	Former Chief Justice of East Pakistan	
Abdul Latif Biswas	Bachelor 1919	Former federal minister for Food and Agriculture of Pakistan; Former provincial minister for Revenue and Land Reforms of East Pakistan	
Khan Bahadur Abdul Karim	F.A. 1892	Former Minister of Education of Bengal	
Golam Mohiuddin Faroqui		Bengali zamindar and politician Minister of Local Autonomy, Public Health, Agriculture, Industries, Co-operatives and Public Works Former Chief Whip at the Bengal Legislative Council Former Chairman of the Tipperah District Board	
Sris Chandra Chattopadhyaya	B.A. 1897 B.L. 1904	Member of 1st National Assembly of Pakistan	
Nawab Sirajul Islam	B.A. 1867	Former Member of the Bengal Legislative Council	
Shahed Ali Patwary	B.A. (Hons.) 1921	Former Deputy Speaker of East Pakistan Provincial Assembly Former member of Bengal Legislative Assembly	
Nicholas Pogose		Armenian merchant and zamindar	

== Academia and science ==
Name	Batch	Notability	Notes
Muhammad Ibrahim	Intermediate 1918	8th vice-chancellor of the University of Dhaka	
Abdul Matin Chowdhury	I.Sc. 1939	14th vice-chancellor of the University of Dhaka	
AAMS Arefin Siddique		27th vice-chancellor of the University of Dhaka	
Syed Ali Ahsan	F.A. 1939	2nd vice-chancellor of Jahangirnagar University 8th vice-chancellor of the University of Rajshahi Official English translator of the national anthem of Bangladesh	
Musharrof Husain Khan	Intermediate 1951	5th vice-chancellor of Bangladesh University of Engineering and Technology 1st vice-chancellor of Ahsanullah University of Science and Technology	
Muhammad Shahjahan		6th vice-chancellor of Bangladesh University of Engineering and Technology	
Nooruddin Ahmed		8th vice-chancellor of Bangladesh University of Engineering and Technology	
A R Mallick	Intermediate 1936	1st vice-chancellor of the University of Chittagong Historian and educationist	
Kanak Kanti Barua	Intermediate 1970	10th vice-chancellor of Bangabandhu Sheikh Mujib Medical University Neurosurgeon and academic	
Nazrul Islam		10th chairman of University Grants Commission	
Kazi Shahidullah	Intermediate 1969	13th chairman of University Grants Commission 9th vice-chancellor of the National University, Bangladesh	
Muhammed Alamgir	Intermediate 1980	3rd vice-chancellor of Khulna University of Engineering & Technology	
Nawab Ali		5th and 7th Principal of Dhaka Medical College	
Khan Abul Kalam Azad	Intermediate 1976	40th principal of Dhaka Medical College	
Abdul Momin Chowdhury	I.A. 1956	4th vice-chancellor of the National University, Bangladesh Former vice-chancellor of Primeasia University Former president of Asiatic Society of Bangladesh Historian and academic	
Nazir Uddin Ahmed		Former Registrar of the University of Dhaka	
M. Zahid Hasan		The Eugene Higgins Professor of Physics at Princeton University Scientist, named to endowed professorship	
Jamilur Reza Choudhury	Intermediate 1959	1st vice-chancellor of BRAC University Former vice-chancellor of University of Asia Pacific Former president of Bangladesh Mathematical Olympiad Committee National Professor of Bangladesh Recipient of the Ekushey Padak	
Amit Chakma	Intermediate 1976	19th vice-chancellor and President of the University of Western Australia 10th President of the University of Western Ontario	
Abdur Razzaq		Educator, intellectual and one of the National Professors of Bangladesh	
Mufazzal Haider Chaudhury	Intermediate 1944	Prominent Bengali essayist, educator and linguist of the Bengali language and Martyred Intellectual	
Muhammed Zafar Iqbal		Academic and writer, recipient of Bangla Academy Literary Award	
Haider A. Khan		Freedom Fighter, professor, international economist, poet, translator, literary, music, art and film critic	
Dinesh Chandra Sen	F.A. 1885	Writer, educationist and researcher of Bengali folklore	
Mir Masoom Ali	I.Sc. 1953	George and Frances Ball Distinguished Professor Emeritus, statistician and educator	
Taj Hashmi		Academic and writer	
Muzaffar Ahmed	Intermediate 1952	Economist and educator Former Director of Institute of Business Administration, University of Dhaka	
Qazi Motahar Hossain	B.A. (Hons.) 1919 M.A. 1921	Author, statistician, chess player, journalist and one of the National Professors of Bangladesh	
Khan Bahadur Abdul Aziz	Graduate 1886	Educationist, writer and social worker	
Syed Modasser Ali		Ophthalmologist	
Mohammed Fazle Rabbee	Intermediate 1950	Cardiologist, medical researcher and martyred intellectual	
Meghnad Saha	I.Sc. 1911	Fellow of the Royal Society Astrophysicist and developer of Saha equation	
Abdul Karim	I.Sc. 1942	Soil scientist	
M Harunur Rashid	I.A. 1942	Archaeologist, educationist and museum curator	
Mohammad Samir Hossain		A theorist in death anxiety	
Maqsudul Alam		Life-science scientist, first to decode the genome sequence of jute in Bangladesh and receiver of the Independence Day Award	
Ahsan Ali	I.Sc. 1954	Recipient of Independence Award Physician, pulmonologist	
Kamrul Islam	Intermediate 1982	Recipient of Independence Award	
Burhanuddin Khan Jahangir	Intermediate 1952	Academic and writer Recipient of Bangla Academy Literary Award and Ekushey Padak	
Khan Bahadur Abdur Rahman Khan	Bachelor's 1912	Educator and writer	
Khan Bahadur Hemayet Uddin Ahmed	F.A. 1884 B.A. 1886 B.L. 1891	Educator, lawyer, education reformer and Islamic personality	
Ashek Ali Khan		Educator	

== Military and diplomacy ==
Name	Batch	Notability	Notes
Khaled Mosharraf	I.A. 1955	3rd Chief of Army Staff Major General, Bir Uttom	
Muhammad Mahbubur Rahman		9th Chief of Army Staff Former Member of Parliament	
Ismail Faruque Chowdhury	Intermediate 1970	Major General Former Engineer-in-Chief of Bangladesh Army	
Mizanur Rahman Shamim		Lieutenant General, Bir Protik Former Director General of Bangladesh Ansar and Village Defence Party Former Principal Staff Officer of Armed Forces Division Former Chief of General Staff of the Bangladesh Army	
Kazi Sharif Kaikobad		Major general Former Director General of Bangladesh Ansar and Village Defence Party	
Shafaat Jamil		Colonel, Bir Bikrom	
Abu Zafar Obaidullah	I.A. 1950	Former Ambassador of Bangladesh to the United States	
Osman Sarwar Alam Chowdhury	B.A. 1959	Former Ambassador of Bangladesh to the United Arab Emirates Former Member of Parliament	
Sheikh Kamal	Intermediate 1969	Freedom fighter, founder of Abahani Limited Dhaka	
Sheikh Jamal		Freedom fighter, second son of Sheikh Mujibur Rahman	
Shafi Imam Rumi	Intermediate 1971	Freedom fighter, martyr, son of Jahanara Imam	
Dinesh Gupta	I.Sc. 1928 (failed)	Indian revolutionary who took part in the Writers' Building attack	
Pulin Behari Das		Bengali revolutionary	

== Corporate and entrepreneur ==
Name	Batch	Notability	Notes
Fazle Hasan Abed	Intermediate 1954	Founder and former chairman of BRAC Recipient of Ramon Magsaysay Award	
Mustafa Jabbar	Intermediate 1968	The entrepreneur behind the Bijoy Bangla computing interface	
Mahmudul Hasan Sohag	Intermediate 2000	Co-founder of Rokomari.com	
Imran Khan	Intermediate 1996	Former Chief Strategy Officer of Snap Inc.	

== Culture and literature ==
Name	Batch	Notability	Notes
Humayun Ahmed	Intermediate 1967	Novelist, filmmaker, songwriter, and chemist	
Humayun Azad	Intermediate 1964	Poet, novelist, short-story writer, critic, linguist, columnist and professor of Dhaka University	
Abdul Gaffar Chowdhury		Writer, columnist, philosopher and lyricist of Amar Bhaier Rokte Rangano	
Mahfuz Ullah		Writer, journalist, television personality and environmentalist	
Akhteruzzaman Elias	Intermediate 1960	Novelist and short story writer	
Alauddin Al-Azad	Intermediate 1949	Author, novelist, poet, literary critic and educationist	
Abu Shahriar	I.Sc. 1954	Fiction writer and literary translator	
Mohammad Mahfuz Ullah	I.A. 1952 B.A. 1955	Litterateur, poet and journalist	
Mohammad Rafiq		Poet Recipient of Ekushey Padak and Bangla Academy Literary Award	
Lutfor Rahman Riton	Intermediate 1981	Recipient of Bangla Academy Literary Award	
Shafiuddin Ahmed	I.A. 1962	Language and literature researcher	
Nowsher Ali Khan Yusufzai	F.A. 1887	Writer and philanthropist	
Shamsur Rahman	I.A. 1947	Poet	
Mahadev Saha	Did not graduate	Poet	
Kaiser Haq		Poet and writer	
Abu Zafar Obaidullah	I.A. 1950	Poet	
Rudra Mohammad Shahidullah	Intermediate 1975	Poet	
Khan Mohammad Farabi	Intermediate 1971	Poet and author	
Buddhadeva Bose	I.A. 1927	Poet	
Syed Waliullah	I.A. 1941	Novelist, short story writer and playwright	
Abu Hasan Shahriar		Poet	
Abul Hasan		Poet and journalist	
Shahidul Zahir		Poet	
Abdul Mannan Syed	I.A. 1960	Poet and critic	
Abdur Rashid Khan	Intermediate 1945	Writer, educator, essayist and poet	
Ghulam Murshid		Author, scholar and journalist	
Mohiuddin Ahmad		Writer and political historiographer	
Padmanath Bhattacharya	B.A. (Hons.) 1890	Historian	
Abu Md. Delwar Hossain	Intermediate 1979	Historian	
Abu Hena Mustafa Kamal	I.A. 1954	Former Director General of Bangla Academy Songwriter, poet, essayist, poet, presenter	

== Media, entertainment and sports ==
Name	Batch	Notability	Notes
Niaz Murshed	Intermediate 1985	Chess Grandmaster	
Kazi Salahuddin		President of South Asian Football Federation President of Bangladesh Football Federation Footballer	
Matiur Rahman	Intermediate 1963	Editor of Prothom Alo Recipient of Ramon Magsaysay Award	
Waheedul Haq		Journalist, writer, musicologist and one of the founders of Chhayanaut	
Abul Mansur Ahmad	B.A. 1921	Journalist, recipient of Bangla Academy Literary Award and Independence Day Award	
Ahmed Humayun	Intermediate 1956	Journalist, recipient of the Ekushey Padak	
Serajur Rahman		Journalist, broadcaster, columnist	
Abul Kalam Shamsuddin	Intermediate 1919	Journalist and author	
Shafik Rehman	Intermediate 1951	Journalist	
Deenanath Sen		2nd Editor of Dhaka Prakash Journalist and social reformer	
Mashir Hossain		Journalist and language activist	
Amalendu Dasgupta	I.A. 1942	Journalist	
Khan Ataur Rahman	I.Sc. 1945	Actor, director, producer, screenplay writer, music composer and singer	
Alamgir Kabir	I.Sc. 1954	Film director and cultural activist Recipient of Independence Award	
Mohammod Hossain Jemi		Film director and cinematographer	
Saidul Anam Tutul	Intermediate 1971	Drama and film director	
Mohammad Mostafa Kamal Raz		Director and screenwriter	
Rathindranath Roy		Musician	
Tanzir Tuhin		Architect, musician, and member of the band Avash	
Shafiq Tuhin		Lyricist and music director	
Dulal Talukder		Choreographer and musician	
Manna		Actor	
Khaled Khan	Intermediate 1975	Actor	Chanchal Khan Intermediate 1975 Singer
Shajal Noor		Actor	
Afran Nisho		Actor	
Ferdous Ahmed		Actor	
Mosharraf Karim		Actor	
Syed Abdul Hadi		Singer, songwriter	
S D Rubel		Singer	

== Bureaucrat ==
Name	Batch	Notability	Notes
Salehuddin Ahmed	I.Sc. 1965	9th Governor of Bangladesh Bank	
Ahsan H. Mansur	Intermediate	13th Governor of Bangladesh Bank	https://www.tbsnews.net/economy/banking/ahsan-h-mansur-becomes-bb-governor-916126
Anwarul Iqbal	Intermediate 1967	22nd Inspector General of Police 1st director general of Rapid Action Battalion	
Mohammad Hadis Uddin	Intermediate 1967	23rd Inspector General of Police	
A. F. M. Abdur Rahman		Retired justice of the High Court Division of the Supreme Court of Bangladesh	
Md. Atabullah		Justice of the High Court Division of the Supreme Court of Bangladesh	
Mokammel Hossain	Intermediate 1981	Secretary of Civil Aviation and Tourism	
Krishna Govinda Gupta	F.A. 1869	Former Member of Indian Civil Service Former Member of Secretary of State's Council of India	
A. F. Mujibur Rahman	I.Sc., B.Sc.	Jurist and first Bengali Muslim Indian Civil Service (ICS) officer	
Monirul Islam		Additional commissioner of Bangladesh Police and the current Chief of Counter Terrorism and Transnational Crime (CTTC)	
Md Mozammel Haque Khan	Intermediate 1976	Former commissioner of Anti-Corruption Commission Former Senior Secretary of Public Administration	
Soleman Khan	Intermediate 1984	Secretary of Secondary and Higher Education Former Chairman of Land Reform Board	
Humayun Kabir		Secretary of Railways Former Divisional Commissioner of Rajshahi Division	

== Others ==
Name	Batch	Notability	Notes
Zafrullah Chowdhury		Recipient of Ramon Magsaysay Award and Independence Award Founder of Gonoshasthaya Kendra Public health activist	
Shamsul Huda	I.A. 1951	Language activist	
Noorul Quader	Intermediate 1952	Freedom fighter, civil servant, entrepreneur and bureaucrat	
Abdur Rauf		Navy officer, politician	
Khandaker Azizul Islam		Bir Bikrom, freedom fighter	
Nurul Azim		Colonel and psychiatrist	
Debapriya Bhattacharya		Economist and public policy analyst	

== See also ==
- List of alumni of Notre Dame College, Dhaka
