= List of University of Western Australia people =

The University of Western Australia has seen many notable people pass through its doors over its 115-year history, both as students and staff.

== Notable alumni ==
=== Politics ===
- Rozaina Adam, Maldivian Member of Parliament
- Colin Barnett, former Premier of Western Australia
- Kim Beazley, former Leader of the Opposition, Deputy Prime Minister and Ambassador to the United States, current Governor of Western Australia
- Kim Beazley Sr., former Whitlam government Cabinet Minister
- Boediono, former Vice President of Indonesia
- Alan Carpenter, former Premier of Western Australia
- Richard Court, former Premier of Western Australia
- Peter Dowding, former Premier of Western Australia
- Peter Durack, former Federal Attorney General
- Geoff Gallop, former Premier of Western Australia
- Sir Paul Hasluck, 17th Governor-General of Australia
- Bob Hawke, former Prime Minister of Australia
- Carmen Lawrence, former Premier of Western Australia, Federal Minister and President of the Australian Labor Party
- Donton Samuel Mkandawire, former MP for Mzimba District, Malawi and Minister of Education for Malawi
- Wangdi Norbu, Bhutanese Finance Minister
- Troy Pickard, former City of Joondalup Mayor, City of Stirling Deputy Mayor, ALGA President, WALGA President, businessman
- Stephen Smith, former Australian Minister for Defence
- Billy Snedden, former Leader of the Liberal Party of Australia
- Daryl Williams, former Federal Attorney General
- Yeo Cheow Tong, former Minister of Transport in Singapore

=== Business ===
- Michael Chaney, former CEO of Wesfarmers; former chancellor of UWA
- Rod Eddington, former CEO of British Airways
- Andrew Forrest, mining magnate and founder of Fortescue
- Richard Goyder, former CEO of Wesfarmers, chair of AFL Commission and Qantas
- Janet Holmes à Court, businesswoman
- Robert Holmes à Court, entrepreneur
- John Hay, former vice-chancellor of University of Queensland
- Peter Lim, Singaporean billionaire
- Michael Malone, iiNet founder
- Ken Michael, former Governor of Western Australia; former Chancellor of UWA
- Tan Sri Hamdan Mohamad, current Executive Director and President of Ranhill Berhad
- Sarfraz Nawaz, President of Cricket
- Peter Smedley, CEO of Colonial Group, Mayne Nickless

=== Public service and community ===
- Ameer Ali, former president of the Australian Federation of Islamic Councils
- Nicholas Blain, former Deputy President of the Australian Industrial Relations Commission
- Herbert Cole Coombs, first Governor of the Reserve Bank of Australia
- Margaret Feilman, architect and town planner
- Allan Fels, former Chairman of the Australian Competition & Consumer Commission
- Ron Fitch, commissioner of the South Australian Railways
- David Irvine, Director-General of Security; former Director-General of Australian Secret Intelligence Service; former Australian High Commissioner to PNG; Ambassador to the People's Republic of China
- Michael Sheldrick, policy entrepreneur advocating for polio eradication
- Ralph Townsend, headmaster of Winchester College

=== Law ===
- James Edelman, former Justice of the Federal Court of Australia, current Justice of the High Court of Australia
- Robert French, former Chief Justice of Australia, current Chancellor UWA
- Zarah Garde-Wilson, criminal lawyer
- David Indermaur, criminal psychologist
- Wayne Martin, former Chief Justice of the Supreme Court of Western Australia
- Neville Owen, former Justice of the Supreme Court of Western Australia, current Chair of the Truth, Justice and Healing Council
- Christopher Steytler, former Justice of the Supreme Court of Western Australia
- John Toohey, former Justice of the High Court of Australia
- Ronald Wilson, former Justice of the High Court of Australia

=== Science, medicine, engineering and mathematics ===
- Alexandra Atack, biomechanist
- David Blair, physicist
- Caroline Bower, medical researcher and professor of medicine
- Cameron Carter, psychiatrist
- Michelle Harvey, forensic entomologist
- Sue Hatcher, Ph.D. Animal Science, 1995, animal genetics researcher
- Barry Marshall, physician, 2005 Nobel Prize laureate
- Dick Norris, entomologist
- Matt Parker, recreational mathematics author and communicator
- Richard G. Pestell, physician scientist, cancer biologist
- Cheryl Praeger, AC, D.Sc. 1989, mathematician, Western Australian Australian Scientist of the Year 2009, recipient of the Prime Minister's Prize for Science, 2019
- Hugo Rietveld, Ph.D. Physics 1964, crystallographer, inventor of the Rietveld Method
- Gordon Royle, Ph.D. Mathematics 1987, co-author of Algebraic Graph Theory
- Dorothea Sandars, parasitologist
- Amanda Sainsbury-Salis, molecular scientist at the Garvan Institute of Medical Research, educator and author
- Fiona Stanley, epidemiologist, 2003 Australian of the Year
- Mark Stevenson, epidemiologist
- Eric Underwood, B.Sci.Ag 1928, Dean of faculty, Agriculture 1946 to 1970
- Akshay Venkatesh, 2018 recipient Fields Medal
- Robin Warren, UWA Emeritus Professor, Nobel Prize laureate
- Fiona Wood, UWA Professor of Medicine, 2005 Australian of the Year

=== Arts, literature and religion ===
- Frederick Alexander, historian
- Taj Hashmi, historian and academic
- Geoffrey Bolton, historian
- Greg Egan, writer
- Tracy Farr, writer and scientist
- Geoff Gibbs, actor and WAAPA principal
- Gracie Gilbert, actress
- Rolf Harris, performer and artist
- Dorothy Hewett, writer
- Barry Hickey, Catholic Archbishop of Perth
- John Kinsella, writer
- John Andrew La Nauze, the first Professor of Australian Studies at Harvard University (1978)
- Niall Lucy, writer and scholar, known for his work on Jacques Derrida and deconstruction
- Philippa Maddern, writer, historian and scholar, Winthrop Professor of History and founding Director of the Centre of Excellence for the History of Emotions
- Sally Morgan, writer and artist
- Randolph Stow, writer
- Shaun Tan, artist and writer
- Arlene Textaqueen, artist
- Josephine Wilson, writer

=== Sport and entertainment ===
- Sandra Angelia, Miss Indonesia 2008
- Peter F. Bell, former captain of the Fremantle Dockers
- Ric Charlesworth, former Australia national field hockey team Kookaburras Captain and Hockeyroos coach
- Michael Fitzpatrick, former captain of the Carlton Football Club; current Chairman of the Australian Football League
- Chloe Forster, basketball player
- Darren Glass (MBA 2015), former captain of the West Coast Eagles
- Rachel Kum, Miss Singapore 2009
- Matthew Pavlich, captain of the Fremantle Dockers
- Ben Purser, basketball player who studied law and commerce
- Jarrad Seng, photographer
- Shirley Strickland, Olympic track and field athlete
- Kylie Wheeler, Olympic heptathlete
- Joshua Yong, Olympic swimmer

=== Music ===
- Mili Davies, classical guitarist
- Sara Macliver, soprano
- Tim Minchin, pianist and comedian
- Roger Smalley, pianist and composer

== Notable administrators ==
- George Alexander Currie, second Vice Chancellor (1941–1952)

=== Chancellors ===
The Chancellor of The University of Western Australia is its most senior officer:

Term start	Term end	Name	Other positions
1912	1916	Sir John Winthrop Hackett	Editor and proprietor of The West Australian; Member of the Legislative Council (1890–1916)
1916	1922	Charles Riley	Bishop of Perth (1894–1914); Archbishop of Perth (1914–1929)
1922	1929	Athelstan Saw	Member of the Legislative Council (1915–1929)
1930	1936	Sir Walter James	Premier of Western Australia (1902–1904)
1936	1943	James Battye	
1943	1948	Sir Walter Murdoch	
1948	1956	E. W. Gillett	
1956	1968	Sir Alexander Reid	
1968	1981	Sir Lawrence Jackson	Chief Justice of Western Australia (1969–1977)
1981	1990	Donald Aitken	
1990	1998	Geoffrey Kennedy	Justice of the Supreme Court of Western Australia
1998	2000	Alexander Cohen	
2001	2005	Ken Michael	Governor of Western Australia (2006–2011)
2005	2017	Michael Chaney	
2017	present	Robert French	Chief Justice of Australia (2008–2017)
Incoming		Diane Smith-Gander	

== Notable faculty ==
Notable past and present members of faculty include:

- Christopher Chantler, physicist
- David Indermaur, psychologist
- James R. Lawler, foundation professor of French Studies
- Jill Milroy, Dean and Winthrop Professor at the University of Western Australia School of Indigenous Studies
- Eric Saint, foundation professor of the Medical School
