= Zahidur Rahim =

Zahidur Rahim জাহেদুর রহিম
- Born: c. 1935; Bogra, Bengal Presidency, British India
- Died: 18 June 1978 (aged 42–43)
- Genre: Rabindra Sangeet
- Instruments: Vocals

Zahidur Rahim (c. 1935 – 18 June 1978) was a Bangladeshi Rabindra Sangeet exponent. He was awarded Ekushey Padak in 2000 by the Government of Bangladesh.

== Early life and education ==
Zahidur Rahim Babu was born in c. 1935 in the Bogra District of the Bengal Presidency. He belonged to a Bengali Muslim family and his father, Abdur Rahim, was from the village of Lochnapara in Shahzadpur, Sirajganj District. Rahim moved to Dhaka in his early life. He graduated with a commerce degree from the University of Dhaka in 1957. He learnt music from musician Atiqul Islam and later at Bulbul Lalitakala Academy.

== Career ==
Rahim first worked in Philips and in the Education Department. He got admitted to Bulbul Lalitakala Academy and passed the music course with credit in 1961. He then joined the academy as a faculty member. His first record of Tagore songs was published in 1972.

Rahim was one of the founders of Chhayanaut and was serving as the General Secretary at the time of his death. He taught in Chhayanaut, Agnibhina, Murchhana, Altaf Mahmud Sangit Niketan, Nazrul Parishad and others. He worked at Bangladesh Radio as a music producer until 1977.

When the Pakistan Government prohibited the singing of Tagore songs in the 1960s, he continued to sing Tagore songs at various meetings and cultural functions, ignoring the threats of the government. He widely popularised the Tagore song, Amar Sonar Bangla, which later became the national anthem. Through his performances of Tagore songs, Zahidur Rahim made valuable contributions to the reawakening of Bengali nationalism in the 1960s.

Abdul Wadud, Papia Sarwar, Chanchal Khan, Roquaiya Hasina Neely and Iftekar Hossain Sohel were among Rahim's students.
