= Shironamhin =

Bangladeshi rock band

Shironamhin শিরোনামহীন
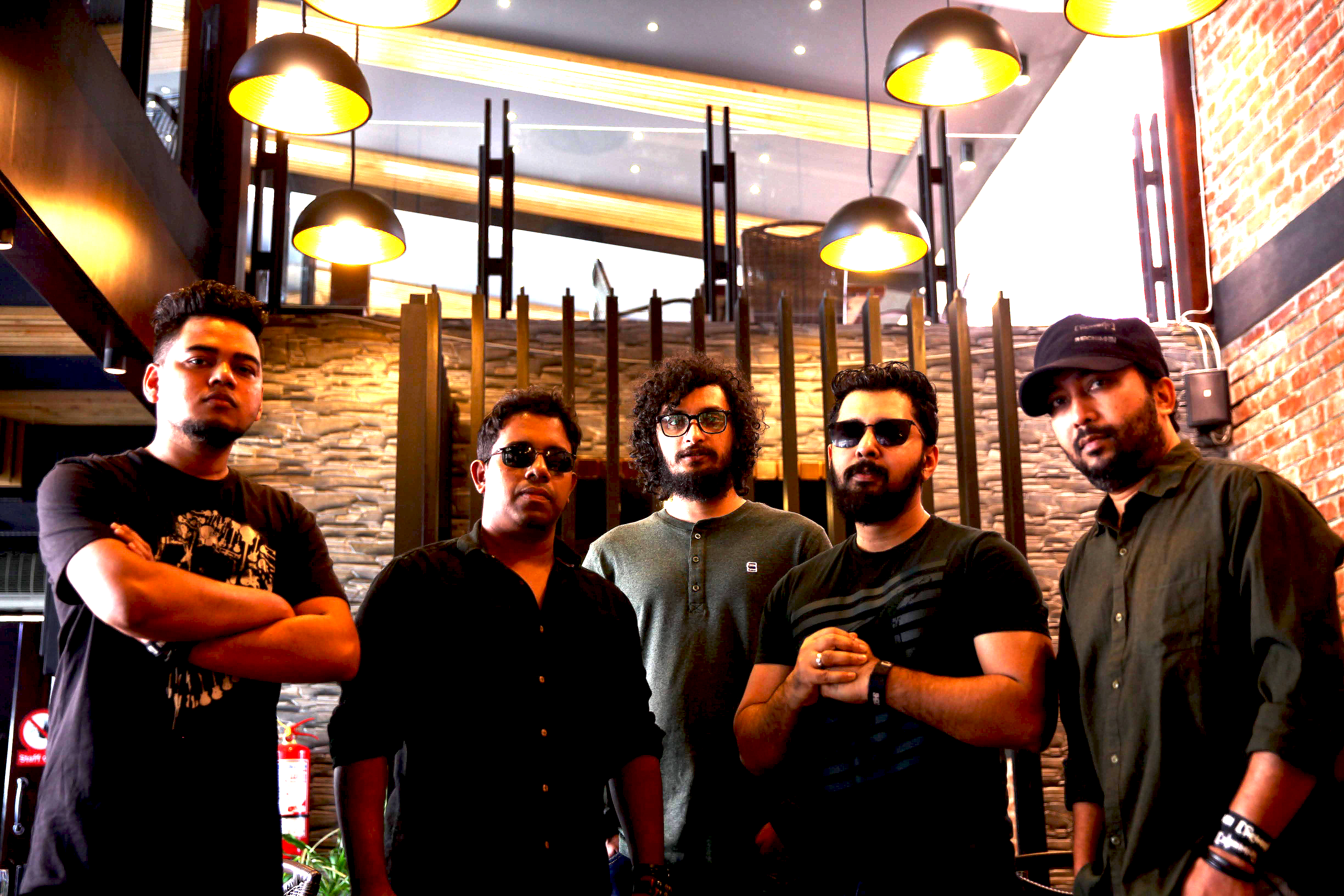
- Group photo of Shironamhin band members in March 2019

Background information
- Origin: Dhaka, Bangladesh
- Genres: Alternative rock; folk rock; psychedelic rock; progressive rock; symphonic rock
- Years active: 1996-present
- Labels: G-Series; Agniveena; Laser Vision; Incursion Music
- Members: Ziaur Rahman; Kazi Ahmad Shafin; Sudipto Sinha Dipu; Sheikh Ishtiaque; Symon Chowdhury
- Past members: Tanzir Tuhin; Russel Kabir; Rajib; Yeasir Tushar; Farhan Karim; Prince; Mohin; Jewel; Bulbul Hasan; Diat Khan
- Website: shironamhin.net

Shironamhin (English: "Untitled") is a Bangladeshi rock band formed in Dhaka on 14 April 1996. Following as a rock group emerging from Dhaka's underground music in the late 1990s, they were distinguished for their extended psychedelic and progressive compositions, multi-instrumental experimentation, and philosophical lyrics and became one of the leading band of the Bengali progressive rock genre. In 2008, the band became a member of the Bangladesh Musical Bands Association (BAMBA).

Shironamhin were founded by students Ziaur Rahman (guitar), Jewel (guitar) and Bulbul Hasan (vocals). Vocalist Tanzir Tuhin joined in 2002 as a fourth member of the band. Zia became the primary lyricist and thematic leader, devising the concepts behind the albums Jahaji (2004), Icche Ghuri (2006), Bondho Janala (2009) and Shironamhin Rabindranath (2010). The last Shironamhin studio album, Shironamhin Shironamhin (2013), was based on unreleased material from the long term musical journey of the group. Their song "Hashimukh" from their debut album became well recognised after its release. The band also composed several film scores.

Following personal tensions, Tuhin left Shironamhin in 2017. Sheikh Ishtiaque later joined the band as a new vocalist. Later they produced six non-album singles "Jadukor" (2017), "Boheimian" (2018), "Barud Shomudro" (2018), "Ei Obelay" (2019), "Cafeteria Periye" (2020) and "Kashfuler Shohor Dekha" (2021).

They have presented orchestration with rock gesture in Bengali music. They have infused classical instruments such as sarod, cello, flute, esraj, violin and many more. On April 18, 2022, they released their sixth album "Perfume".

== History ==
=== 1996-2003: Early years ===
==== Formation ====
Ziaur Rahman was acquainted with Jewel while studying architecture at Bangladesh University of Engineering and Technology. Earlier, Zia used to play in a thrash metal band called Threshold formed in 1992. In the mid-nineties, Zia met Bulbul Hasan, who was studying Chayanat at that time. In 1996, the three formed a band. In the beginning, they used to serve in the University of Dhaka campus, TSC, Madhur Canteen, Hakim Chattar, Arts Cafeteria and nearby crowded places. Since the beginning, Zia used to write songs and compose melodies. Initially they made about fifty songs. On the Pahela Baishakh in 1997, they performed for the first time under the name of Shironamhin, organized by the Padatik Nattya Sangsad at the TSC auditorium of the University of Dhaka. After gaining popularity based on campus they started getting invitations to perform. A few days later, Shironamhin performed in front of a large audience at Bakultala of the Faculty of Fine Arts, University of Dhaka. At that time, there were some changes in their musical instruments. They started using plugged guitars, sarod and drums in the service. All their songs performed on stage were written by themselves so they were new to the audience at that time. They started using plugged guitars, sarod and drums. All their songs performed on stage were written by themselves so they were new to the audience at that time. Their different genres of music and lyrics helped them to gain fame at that time.

Being an expert in Rabindra Sangeet and Nazrul Geeti, Bulbul left the group in 2000 as he could not adapt to the band. Mohin joined as the vocalist of the band. Shironamhin began the rendition of the complete instrument. In the same year, Shironamhin was runners-up in the "Star Search: Benson and Hedges" contest. On the other hand, in December 2000, Tanzir Tuhin replaced Mohin as a new vocalist. at the time Zia and Tuhin were classmates at BUET. In 2003, Farhan Karim (sarod), Yasir Tushar (guitar) and Kazi Ahmad Shafin (drums) joined the team.

==== Jahaji (2004) ====
Jahaji was based on urban lifestyle and struggling. The title track of the album, itself speaks so. Shironamhin, tried to portray the usual daily life and elements from middle class career seeking young sailor of a Bronx. The cultural interest, the gossip in a crowded cityscape, the life of mono busy traffic etc. were conveyed with metaphor and events by this album. Jahajee was the only album from the band Shironamhin that was refused and rejected by every known record label company of Dhaka. "হাসিমুখ (Smiling)" (2004), from the album জাহাজী (Navigator) was a widely used song in the countries television advertisement.

=== 2005–2017: Transition and success ===
==== Icche Ghuri (2006) ====
Ichchhe Ghuri was second album of Shironamhin released from the record label company G-Series in 2006. They tried to do some experiments, draw some maturity in compositions, suited compositions for Live performances and fix in a style for Shironamhin's own. Shironamhin is keen on lyrics from nature. They tried to convey urban crisis in this album in which they did not to draw any comment or did not even try to draw any suggestion. Shironamhin just wanted the listeners to get the message with their own understanding and draw the images or characters with own personal fantasy. They mostly worked on certain topic or events on short-time span. They loved to talk about urban life, draw the urban texture. Cafeteria was a story of one second judging from vivid angles. It is based on a moment someone entering into his campus cafeteria and feel two silent eyes among so many noise and fumes around from the cafe gossiping. Shironamhin tried to make the listeners recall their own cafeteria in their campus life.

==== Bondho Janala (2009) ====
Bondho Janala was a bit challenging for Shironamhin as they were very much used to with sarod sound compositions. In the album they had to explore many more acoustic instruments like esraj, silver flute, trumpet as the album was enriched with vivid orchestration. Lyrically the band Shironamhin tried to work on their already established genre of urban life talks with some bigger aspects and along with historical events or movements. It was released by the record label company G-Series in 2009.

==== Shironamhin Rabindranath (2010) ====
"We believe Rabindranath himself was a cultural institute for us."

— Shironamhin

In 2010, Diat Khan (guitar) joined the band instead of Tushar. The fourth album Shironamhin Rabindranath was a risky task for the band, which is basically a collection of Rabindra Sangeet. The album was released in 2010 on the occasion of the 150th death anniversary of Bengali polymath Rabindranath Tagore. This was the first Rabindra Sangeet album of any band in Bangladesh. Shironamhin considers Tagore as an institution of Bengali culture, as a Bengali, anyone who is at least sensitive to culture should know Rabindranath. Tuhin learned Rabindra Sangeet while studying at Bulbul Lalitakala Academy. In the album, they pay homage to Tagore. Shironamhin vocalist Tuhin said that Rabindra Sangeet has a combination of Vaishnava and Upanishad ideology as well as Indian classical music, Bengali folk music and western music in terms of melody. Zia thinks that many Shironamhin fans, especially teenagers, are not familiar with Rabindra Sangeet. As a result, it is an attempt to increase the interest of the young audience towards the Bengali poet Tagore.

Nine time-honoured songs of Rabindranath have been added to the album. With the help of Swarabitan published in 64 volumes, the main words and melody of Rabindra Swaralipi have been kept correct. The album also features classical, baul, folk, kirtan, sentimental and even western music. They used about 39 local and foreign musical instruments in the composition of the album. For this album they use Brazilian rainmaker, Egyptian darbuka, Irish tin whistle and Scottish Bodhran. On the cover of the album, members of the group around Rabindranath appear as disciples. Mainly it was a performance of classical music in the rock genre. The album was a commercial success after its release.

==== Shironamhin Shironamhin (2013) ====
After the Rabindranath project in 2010, the band started working on the songs of the new album. In 2011, Rajib was replaced by Russel Kabir (keyboard). In 2013, Shironamhin released their first self-titled and their fifth studio album Shironamhin Shironamhin, after an 18-year musical tour. This album is a collection of 10 tracks selected from 25 tracks. The album was recorded at Incarrson Music of Banglamotor, Dhaka. The song "Abar Hashimukh" from the album is a sequel of their previous song "Hashimukh". A music video of the song "Abar Hashimukh" directed by Tanim Rahman Anshu, starring 2007 Miss Bangladesh beauty pageant titleholder Jannatul Ferdoush Peya. The album strives to compile their confessions, demands, rage, hopes and anticipation to invite new light through the old windows of the untitled past. From the lyrical point of view, the album is more specific on topic, searching the positive sides of negative living. Musically, Shironamhin tried western classic orchestration based on violin, cello, contrabass section fused with rock guitar, bass and drums in public classical orchestration.

For the first time, the band released a collector's version of one of their albums. CDs have been added to the edition, and bound books have been added to the cloth covers. Where the lyric of the song, the relevant information including the background of the lyric has been compiled. The album recalled all the members and persons who worked for the band once and forever, expressed their gratitude to those who carried Shironamhin to their journey and dedicated their songs to the listeners whom they comfortable to call friends. Zia himself planned the cover design. On 14 April 2014, a collectors' edition of the album was released by Laser Vision.

=== From 2014 and recent years ===
==== Tuhin' departure and legal battles ====
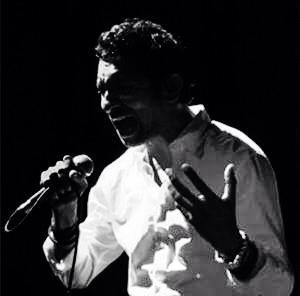
Tanzir Tuhin in 2014 perform as Shironamhin

In 2017, lead vocalist Tanzir Tuhin became embroiled in controversy, and left the band on 7 October. "I'm Tanzir Tuhin leaving Shironamhin for personal reasons, but not the song", Tuhin said on social media Facebook. In 2017, Sheikh Ishtiaque joined as the new vocalist. At the moment Tuhin left the band, vocal went through the process of searching for the title through multiple headless auditions. The band selected Ishtiaque by recording their title "Jadukor" with two different vocals.

In 2017, Tuhin formed a new band named Avash. According to the 2019 Copyright Office, the founding member of the group, Zia, was the lyricist and composer of Shironamhin' songs. In that case, there is a legal obligation to perform the songs without permission. In August of that year, Tuhin ignored the Copyright Office's ruling. Shironamhin filed a complaint in court in August. The court legally barred Tuhin and his band Avash from performing Shironamhin' songs. Avash later appealed against the verdict. On 21 October 2019, the High Court stayed the ban on 49 songs of the band for six months. As a result, Tuhin and his new band Avash were able to perform songs by 2020. Later, in the light of the same law, the band re-appealed to the High Court and on 20 January 2020, the band won the case on their behalf.

==== Further performances and rereleases ====
After Ishtiaque replaced Tuhin as the lead vocalist, the band five non-album singles. All the songs are written by Zia. The song "Jadukor" was released on 7 December 2017, which was composed by Diat Khan. This is the first song for the group sung by Ishtiaque. The music video of the song has been directed by Ashraf Shishir. The song received mixed reactions after its release. The song "Bohemian" was released on 7 January 2016, and was composed by Shafin and the second title by Ishtiaque. Shishir has directed the music video as well. On 7 March of the same year, Shafin and Zia's joint tune "Barud Shomudro" was released. The song "Ei Abelaya" was released on 30 May 2019 to the tune of Shafin. The music video for the song was made by Mir Shariful Karim Shravan, who previously made another music video for the band's song "Bondho Janala".

In 2020, the band celebrated their two eras. On 14 April 2020, Shironamhin released their latest song, "Cafeteria Periye". It is a sequel to the song "Cafeteria" from their previous album "Icche Ghuri" (2006). Zia composed his own lyrics and also played the cello in the song. Shafin also played sarod. Like other Shironamhin songs, the music video was made by Shishir Ahmed. Shishir, the guitarist of the rock band Aurthohin, also performed guitar as a guest artist in the music video. Their latest music video titled "Kashfuler Shohor Dekha" released on 7 May 2021, directed by Naimul Banin. Composer and music director Bappa Mazumder and actress Quazi Nawshaba Ahmed are featured in special roles in the video. "Kashfuler Shohor Dekha" is a sequel of "Shon Shon Jodio Kashbon" released on their album Shironamhin Shironamhin in 2013.

== Musicianship ==
Regarded as one of the pioneers of early progressive and psychedelic music groups in Bangladesh, Shironamhin began their musical career through the underground music in Dhaka. As a multi-instrumental group, the combination of different instruments in music has made them unique. In an interview with the BBC in 2011, Tuhin said that Shironamhin's songs have a sense of life and philosophy rather than love or separation. From the very beginning, they have been singing outside the traditional Bengali music genre.

=== Film scores ===
In 2015, Shironamhin composed and performed a title-song "Podmo Patar Jol" from the film Podmo Patar Jol directed by Tanmay Tansen. On 26 April 2019, the song "E Raat E" was released with lyrics and melody by Zia for the film Amra Ekta Cinema Banabo directed by Ashraf Shishir.

=== Live performances ===
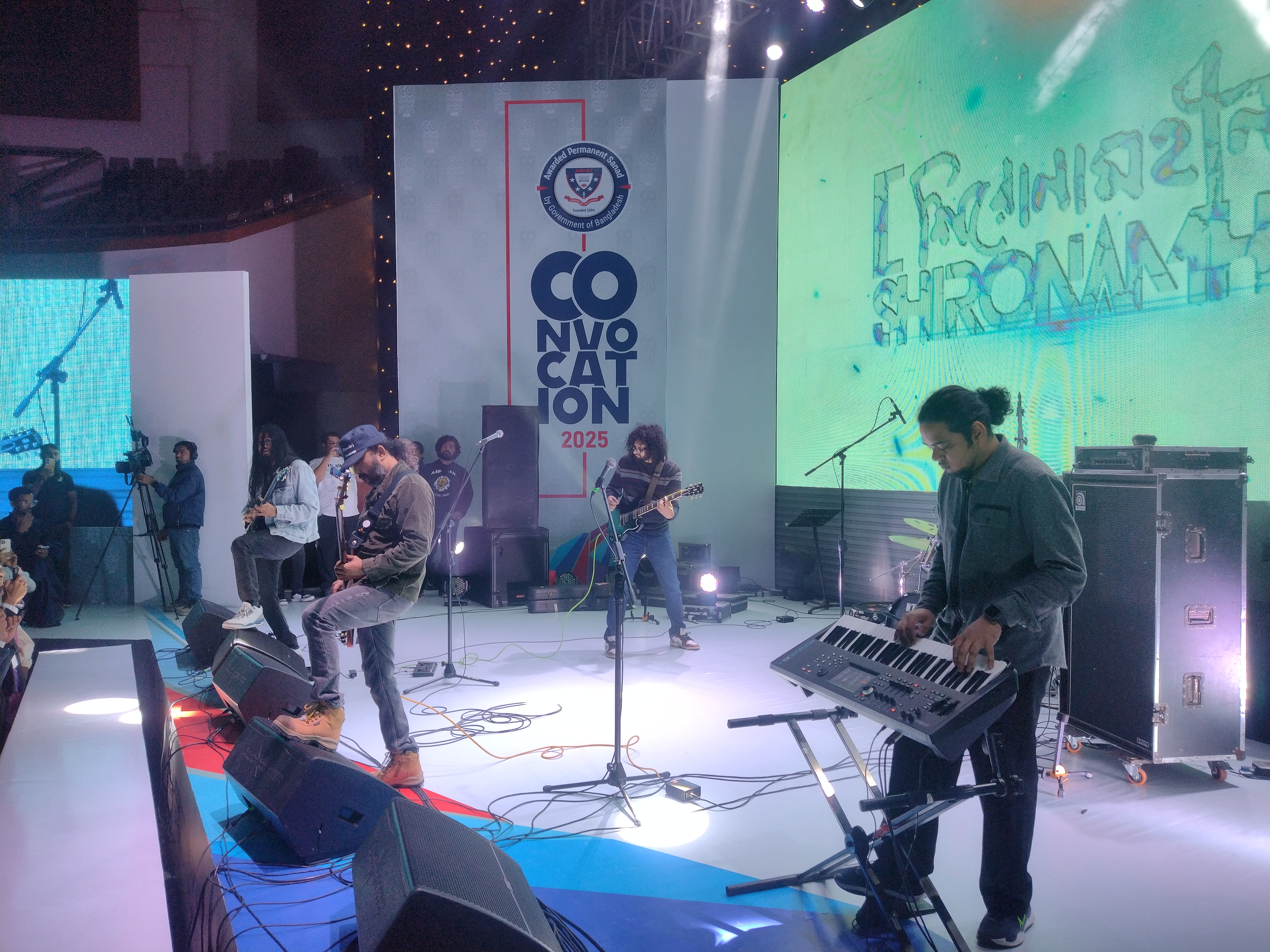
Shironamhin at the Convocation of Atish Dipankar University of Science and Technology, 2025

Shironamhin is known for its campus-based concerts to live performances. In 2014, Shironamhin attended the Sri Lanka's a most famous musical festival titled Galle Music Festival where they enthralled the audiences. There were performances by audiences and bands from various countries, including Norway, Brazil and India. In November 2016, they performed at the University of Malaya.

== Awards and achievements ==
Shironamhin is one of the most commercially successful and influential rock bands in Bangladesh. On 1 August 2008, Shironamhin obtained the membership of Bangladesh Music Bands Association (BAMBA).

List of awards and nominations
Organization	Event date	Category	Work	Result	Ref.(s)
Cultural Journalist Forum of Bangladesh	2005	Best Band	Shironamhin	Won	
Citycell-Channel I Music Award	2006	Best Song	Pakhi	Won	
Symphony-Channel I Music Award	7 May 2016	Best Band	Shironamhin	Won	Critics Award
Oikko-Channel I Music Awards 2019	2019	Best Band	Shironamhin	Won	

== Android application ==
On 13 April 2014, the band became the first Bengali band to launch their official Android application titled "Shironamhin". Details about the band members, songs of their fifth album, lyrics, photographs and updates of the band's activities can be found through the application. The app has the opportunity to listen to all the songs from the band's latest Shironamhin Shironamhin album for free.

== Band members ==
=== Present ===
- Ziaur Rahman – songwriter, composer, bass, cello, sarod (1996–present)
- Kazi Ahmad Shafin – drums, sarod, flute (2003–present)
- Sheikh Ishtiaque – vocals (2017–present)
- Symon Chowdhury – keyboards (2019–present)
- Sudipto Sinha Dipu – lead (2022–present)

=== Past members ===
- Bulbul Hasan - (1996–1998; 2003–2005)
- Jewel – guitars (1996–1999)
- Tanzir Tuhin – vocals (2000–2017)
- Farhan Karim – vocal, sarod, dotara (2004–2006)
- Yeasir Tushar – guitars (2004–2009)
- Prince – keys (2005–2006)
- Rajib – keyboards, synths, keys (2006–2010)
- Diat Khan – lead (2009–2021)
- Russel Kabir – keyboards (2010–2018)

== Discography ==
Studio albums

- Jahaji (2004)
- Icche Ghuri (2006)
- Bondho Janala (2009)
- Shironamhin Rabindranath (2010)
- Shironamhin Shironamhin (2013)
