= Tanzir Tuhin =

Bangladeshi singer-songwriter

- তানজির তুহিন
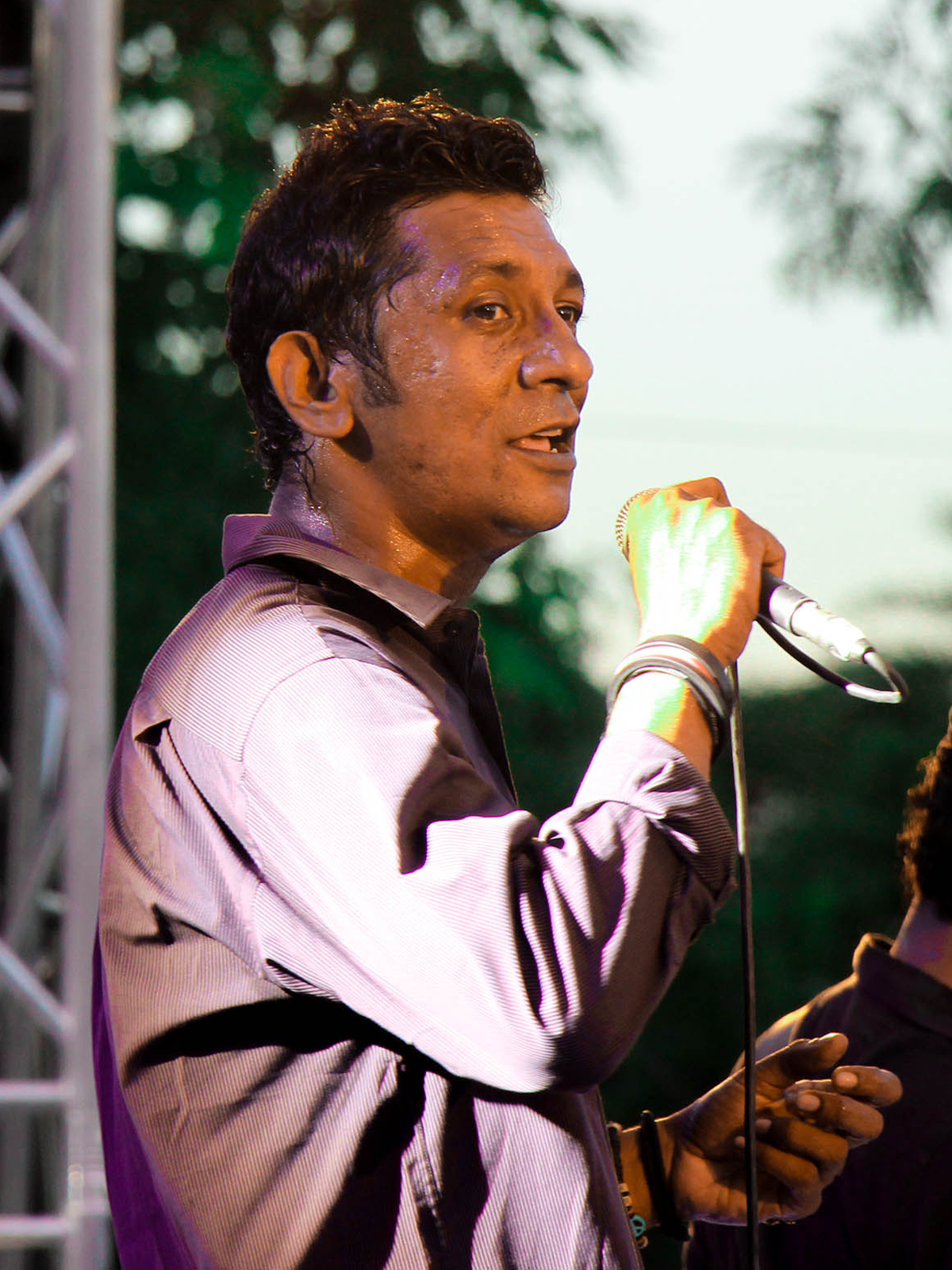
- Tuhin in 2013
- Born: Tanzir Chowdhury Tuhin; 26 September 1974 (age 51); Dhaka, Bangladesh
- Education: B.Arch.
- Alma mater: Dhaka College; Bangladesh University of Engineering and Technology
- Occupations: Musician; singer; songwriter; actor; architect
- Years active: 1984–present
- Children: 2
- Musical career
- Genres: Folk; Rock; Alternative; Classical; Rabindra Sangeet
- Instrument: Vocal
- Labels: Rabbit Communication; G-Series; Laser Vision; Siren

Tanzir Chowdhury Tuhin (born 26 September 1974) is a Bangladeshi musician, singer-songwriter, actor, painter, and architect, best known as a longtime member of the independent music group Shironamhin. He joined the group as lead vocalist in 2000. Shironamhin subsequently achieved national success with their albums Bondho Janala, Shironamhin Rabindranath and Shironamhin Shironamhin. By the late 2000s, they had become one of the most well-known group in the rock music history of Bangladesh. Amid personal conflict, Tuhin left Shironamhin in 2017 and form a new band named Avash at the end of that year.

Tuhin has a well reputed solo career which has included several studio soundtracks: Tobu is the first solo track has been scheduled to release in 2017.

In 2014, Tuhin has taken part as host for BBC's reality television series Amrai Pari to raising public awareness about combat extreme weather. In 2016, he took part "Inauguration drive for Toys R Yours season 2" for children most of whom are from are from underprivileged families.

== Early life and education ==
Tanzir Tuhin was born in Dhaka, Bangladesh. He spent his childhood there.

Tuhin attended Government Laboratory High School in Dhaka up to the tenth grade. He got higher secondary from Dhaka College, and afterwards studied in the Bangladesh University of Engineering and Technology in Architecture. For the first several years, when was in fifth standard in school, Tuhin learned Nazrul Geeti and classical music from Bulbul Lalitakala Academy, where Narayan Chandra Basak, Akhtar Sadmani, Kiran Chandra Roy, Rafiqul Islam, Tapan Mahmud, and the legendary Ustad Niaz Mohammad Chowdhury were his music masters.

== 2000–2017: Shironamhin ==
In 2000 Tuhin joined the progressive rock band Shironamhin as a vocal with the founding member of the group songwriter, bass guitarist Ziaur Rahman Zia, guitarist Jewel and Bulbul. Their first album Jahaji was released in 2004. Since they have released 5 studio albums and several mixed albums. Their latest album titled Shironamhin Shironamhin was released on 19 July 2013. Amid creative differences, Tuhin left this group in October 2017.

== 2017 ~ : Avash ==
In 2017 Tuhin left Shironamhin to pursue an independent musical career. He has been working on a number of songs with different musicians and composers in the Bangladeshi musical industry.

Tuhin's solo career to date includes 4 studio soundtracks: Tobuo is the first solo track has been scheduled to release in 2017. Also a movie-tracks "Shotto Mitthar Kundoli" in the movie "Deho Station" got critical acclaim among the music critics as well as was appreciated by his fan base. He also did a second solo, 'Bibek' in 2019. In 2020, he released another single, titled, Alo. Written and composed by the versatile composer-lyricist, Prince Mahmud. It is dedicated to Ayub Bachchu.

== Acting ==
Tuhin made his acting debut in Madharatrite Tinjon Durbhaga Torun, a television film adaptation of the story of the same name by Muhammed Zafar Iqbal. Gradually he appeared in the television films, Thotomoto Ei Shohore directed by Mahdy Hasan in 2011, Spook by Tanim Rahman Angshu in 2011, and Trump Card II by Mizanur Rahman Aryan in 2013.

== Painting ==
Tuhin also loves to paint and has a huge collection of paintings. From doodles, portraits to abstract & modern strokes, water colour to oil paintings, Tuhin has a unique painting style which is very reflective of his growing up in urbanism. A solo painting exhibition of his was held in Alliance Française de Dhaka, Dhanmondi in the year 2000. Tuhin also has designed book covers for a number of books. He has also done the internal decoration of these books.

== Personal life ==
Tuhin is married to Laboni Ferdous, and the couple have two children: Shanto and Neha.

== Discography ==
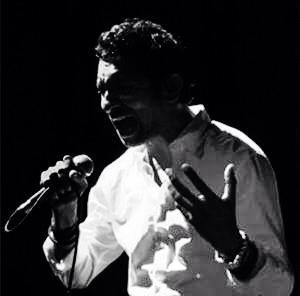
Tuhin performing live.

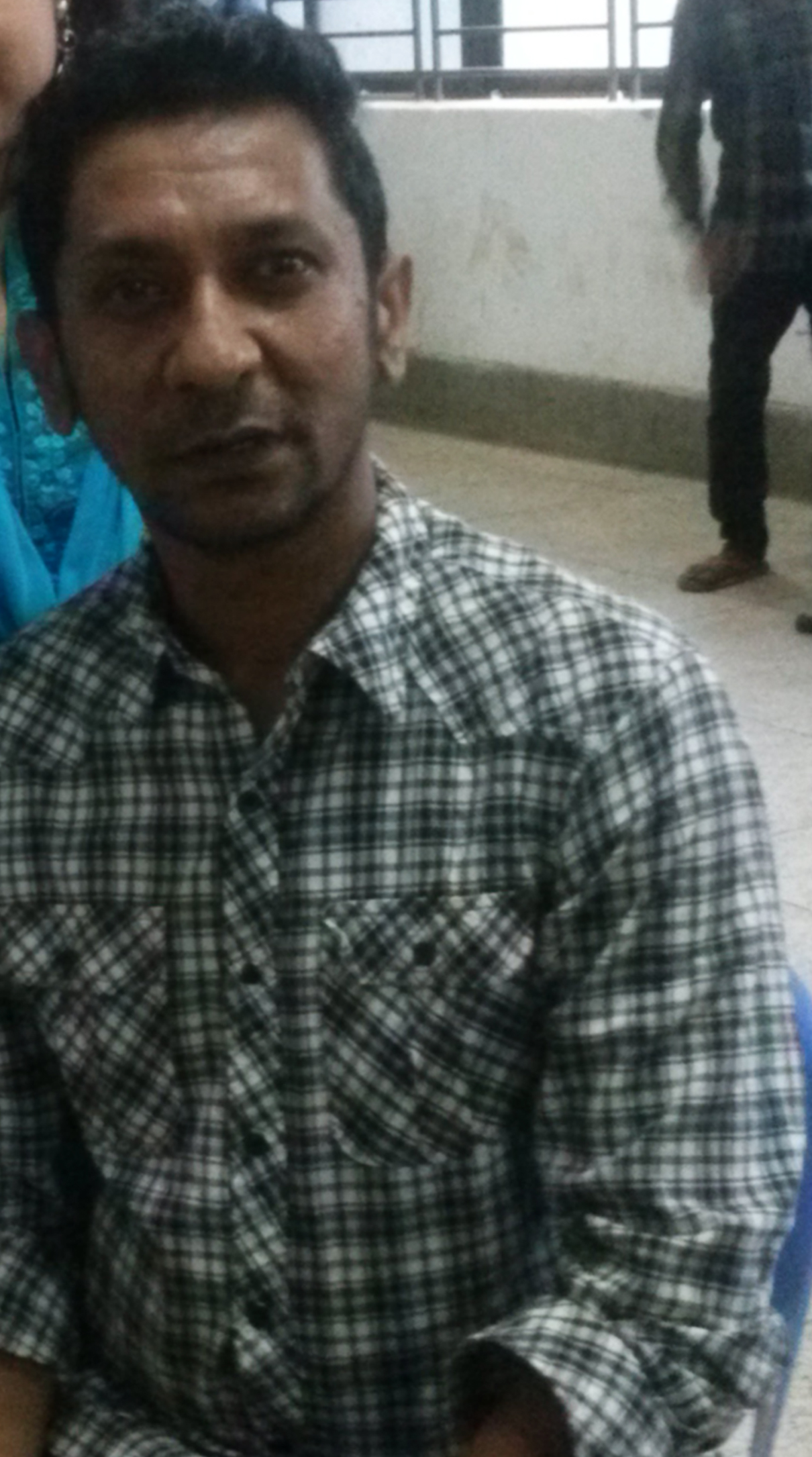
Tanzir Tuhin in Chittagong.

=== Singles ===
Title	Year	Note
"Tobuo"	2017	first solo
"Bibek"	2019	second solo
"Alo"	2020	Written and composed by Prince Mahmud

=== Film Scores ===
Song	Year	Film	Note
Shotto Mitthar Kundoli	2015	Deho Station	

=== Band (Avash) ===
Title	Year	Note
"Manush-1"	2017	single
"Avash"	2019	single
"Bastob"	2020	single

=== Shironamhin ===
Title	Year	Note
"Jahaji"	2004	
"Icche Ghuri"	2006	
"Bondho Janala"	2009	
"Shironamhin Rabindranath"	2010	
"Shironamhin Shironamhin"	2013	

==== Film Scores ====
Title	Year	Note
"Podmo Patar Jol"	2015	

==== Mixed albums ====
Title	Year	Note
"Shopnochura 2"	2004	
"Shopnochura 3"	2007	
"Neon Aloy Shagotom"	2007	
"Bondhuta"	2008	
"Rock 101"	2008	
"Joyoddhoni"	2012	
"Gorje Otho Bangladesh "	2012	

== Television ==
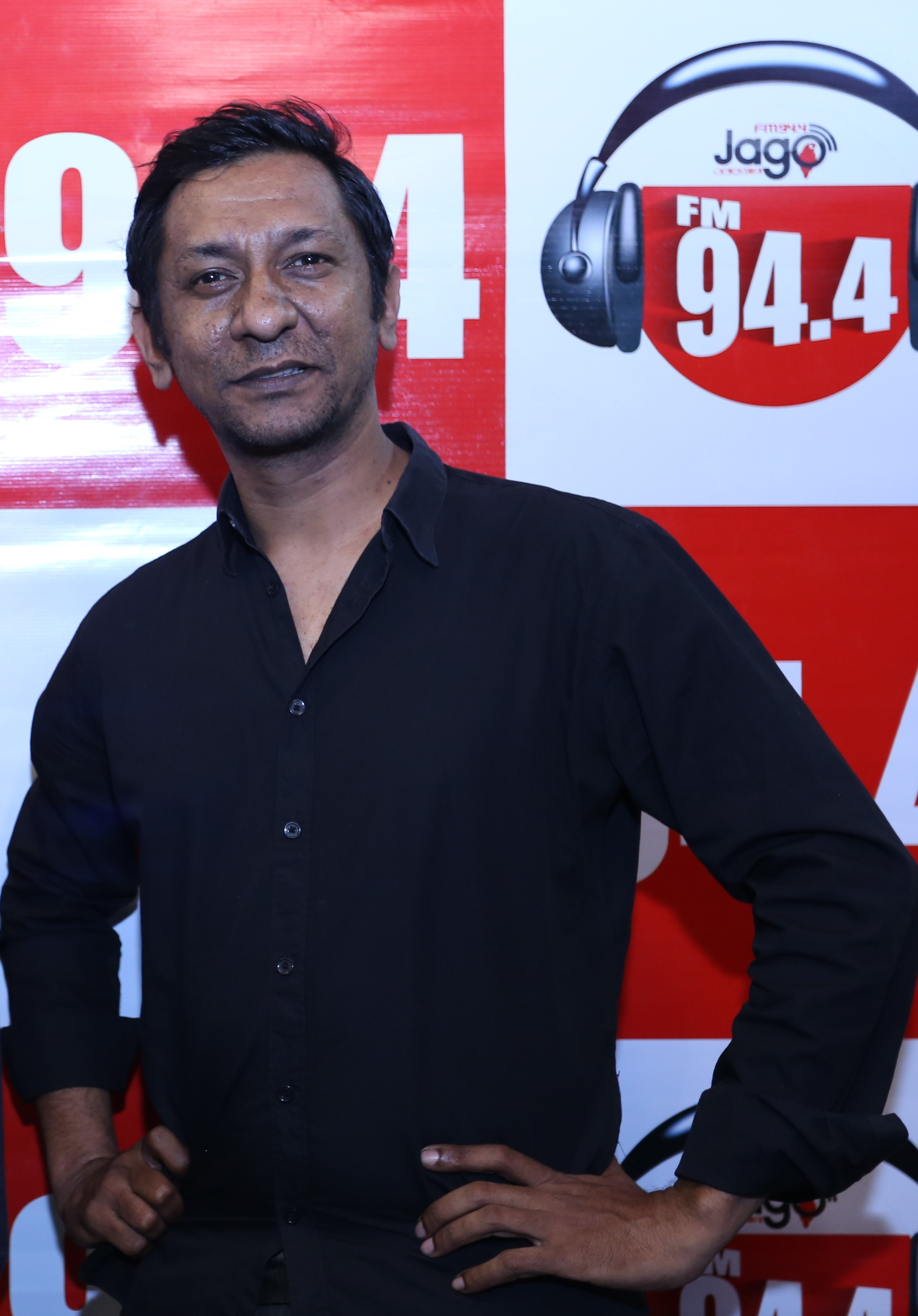

Title	Year(s)	Role	Notes	Ref(s)
Madharatrite Tinjon Durbhaga Torun	-		TV movie	
Thotomoto Ei Shohore	2011		Television Drama	
Spunk	-		Television Drama	
Trump Card II	2013	Jiko	TV movie	
Amrai Pari	2014	Himself	BBC's reality television series, co-host with Sahana rahman and Kazi Tanvir	
