= Mark Stevenson =

Mark Stevenson or Stephenson may refer to:

- Mark Stevenson (businessman) (born 1971), British writer, businessman, public speaker and futurologist
- Mark Stevenson (epidemiologist) (born 1964), Australian epidemiologist, author, and academic
- Mark Stevenson (American football) (born 1956), American football player
- E. Mark Stevenson, American Episcopal bishop
- Mark Stephenson (darts player) (born 1976), English darts player
- Mark Kinsey Stephenson, American actor
- Mark Stephenson (conductor), founder of chamber orchestra London Musici
