= Chittagong University Central Students' Union =

Official student union of the University of Chittagong

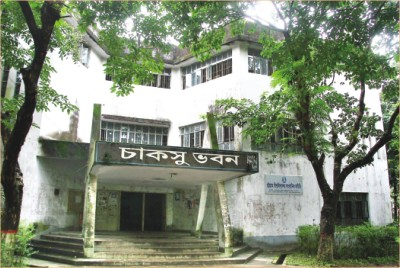
- Institution: University of Chittagong
- Location: Hathazari, Chittagong
- President: Mohammad Al-Forkan
- Vice president: Ibrahim Hossain Roni (BICS)
- General secretary: Saeed Bin Habib (BICS)
- Members: 27,521 (as of September 2025)
- Website: cucsu.cu.ac.bd

Chittagong University Central Students’ Union (Bengali: চট্টগ্রাম বিশ্ববিদ্যালয় কেন্দ্রীয় ছাত্র সংসদ, romanized: Caṭṭagrām Biśbôbidyālôẏ Kendriẏo Chatro Sôṅsôd), abbreviated as CUCSU (Bengali: চাকসু), is the representative student organization of the University of Chittagong in Bangladesh. It serves as the elected platform for students, organizing campus activities and voicing student interests within university governance. CUCSU did not hold elections between February 1990 and October 2025.

== History ==
The University of Chittagong was founded in November 1966. According to political scientist Amin-al-Zaman, its student union was a stronghold of the Awami League's student wing, the Bangladesh Chatra League (BCL). After the 1975 assassination of Sheikh Mujibur Rahman, Islamist parties began to gain strength. Bangladesh Jamaat-e-Islami re-emerged as a political party in 1979. The party believed the country was not ready to support Jamaat rule, so it made it a priority to "reconstruct and purify the thoughts of people". One way it educated and influenced the masses was through its student wing, the Islami Chhatra Shibir (ICS).

By 1981, the Awami League had been weakened by internal factionalism. An outright split of the organization was avoided by electing Sheikh Hasina, Sheikh Mujibur Rahman's daughter, party president. But she had been abroad since before 1975, did not return until May 1981, and could not immediately knit together the two main factions.

The BCL was unable to form a unified panel of candidates for the 1981 Chittagong University Central Students' Union (CUCSU) election. They fielded two rival panels, and as a result, both were defeated. The ICS proved that it was one of the strongest student fronts in the country when it won 15 out of 17 seats in the election, capturing control of the CUCSU for the first time. According to historian Taj Hashmi, they proceeded to terrorize all opposing groups. ICS maintained control of the CUCSU until 1990 despite the combined opposition of the BCL, Jatiotabadi Chatra Dal, and pro-leftist student organisations.

Six CUCSU elections were held from its founding through February 1990. After that, the union's operations came to an end, and it did not hold representative elections for about 35 years. A new constitution was approved by the university administration in 2025, and elections to resurrect CUCSU were set for 12 October 2025.

== 2025 Constitution ==
After many years without elections, the previous framework was replaced by the new CUCSU constitution in 2025. The new amendment states that CUCSU's executive committee has 28 positions (there were previously 28 but the distribution of executive positions was different).

Important modifications consist of:

- 30 is the upper age limit for voters and candidates.
- 12 new secretarial/portfolio positions were created, including ones for Communication & Housing, Science & Information Technology, Research & Innovation, and Health.
- "Social Service, Environment and Human Rights Affairs" is the new name for the enlarged "Social Service" portfolio.

Rules of eligibility:

- Voting and running are restricted to regular students (undergraduate, master's, MPhil, PhD) who live on campus or are connected to a university hall.
- Students from affiliated colleges or those enrolled in evening, executive, diploma, or certificate programs are not eligible.

Other aspects of the constitution:

The president of CUCSU is the university's chancellor.

Elected officials are sworn to uphold the spirit of the Liberation War, democratic movements (including the July 2024 uprising), and religious values as part of the constitution.

== List of CUCSU leaders ==
The vice-chancellor of the university is the ex-officio president of CUCSU. The president nominates a faculty member as treasurer. Students directly elect the remaining 17 members of the governing committee.

=== List of vice-presidents and general secretaries ===
No.	Year	Vice President	Student Organization	General Secretary	Student Organization	Ref.
1	1970	Mohammad Ibrahim	East Pakistan Students' League	Mohammad Abdur Rab	East Pakistan Students' League	
2	1972	Shamsuzzaman Hira	Bangladesh Students' Union	Mahmudur Rahman Manna	JSD Chhatra League	
3	1974	S.M. Fazlul Haque	JSD Chhatra League	Golam Jilani Chowdhury	JSD Chhatra League	
4	1979	Mazharul Haque Shah Chowdhury	JSD Chhatra League	Zamir Chowdhury	Bangladesh Chhatra League	
5	1981	Jasim Uddin Sarkar	Bangladesh Islami Chhatra Shibir	Abdul Ghaffar	Bangladesh Islami Chhatra Shibir	
6	1990	Nazim Uddin	National Chhatra League	Azim Uddin	Socialist Students' Front	
7	2025	Ibrahim Hossain Roni	Bangladesh Islami Chhatra Shibir	Sayed Bin Habib	Bangladesh Islami Chhatra Shibir	
