= Tapan Mahmud =

Tapan Mahmud তপন মাহমুদ
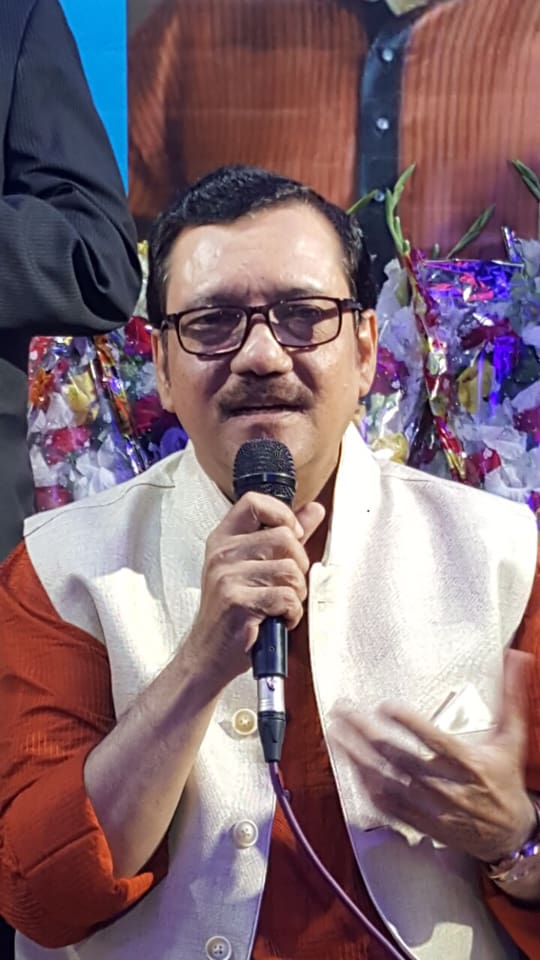

Background information
- Born: 1952 or 1953 (age 72–73)
- Genres: Rabindra Sangeet
- Instruments: Vocal, harmonium

Tapan Mahmud is a Bangladeshi Rabindra Sangeet singer. He received Rabindra Padak from Bangla Academy in 2016.

== Career ==
In 1958, at the age of 5, Mahmud started taking music lessons from Narayan Chandra Saha, Fazle Nizami and Arabinda Bishwas. He rendered songs at the Bangladesh Betar and Bangladesh Television as a special grade artist since 1969. During the Liberation War of Bangladesh in 1971, he joined the Swadhin Bangla Betar Kendra and also rendered voice as a Rabindra Sangeet artist for the Akashbani Radio of Kolkata.

Mahmud started singing since the early 1970s. He formed a cultural group, Boitalik.

Mahmud served as the founder general secretary of Bangladesh Rabindra Sangeet Shilpi Sangstha (RSSS) from 1988 to 2011 and then as the president of the organization. He has also served as a senior teacher of Rabindra Sangeet and later as principal of the Bulbul Lalitakala Academy during 1979–2008.

Mahmud has released several albums.
