= Francis J. Sullivan =

Australian teacher and administrator

Francis John Sullivan AO (born 8 August 1956) is a teacher, administrator, and leader in health care organisations, who was CEO of the Catholic Church in Australia's Truth, Justice and Healing Council, in addition to being the previous Secretary-General of the Australian Medical Association). He was the chief executive officer of Catholic Health Australia from 1994 to 2008. In 2020, Sullivan was honoured for his services to the community as an Officer of the Order of Australia (A0).

== Early life and education ==
Sullivan was born in Perth, Western Australia, where he attended Servite College. He received a Bachelor of Arts degree majoring in Politics from Curtin University of Technology (1977) and a Diploma of Education from University of Western Australia (1978).

Between 1987 and 1988 Sullivan travelled to Chicago with his wife and daughter where he received a Master of Arts at Loyola University Chicago (1988). He later returned to Australia, residing in Canberra, alongside his wife and three children.

== Career ==
Sullivan was a high school teacher and deputy principal at many Catholic high schools and colleges in Perth between 1979 and 1990, including Servite College, where he taught religious education.

Between 1990 and 1993, Sullivan worked in the Government of Western Australia as the Chief of Staff for Labor Health Minister Keith Wilson, before moving to Canberra with his wife Susan and three children in 1993 to take up a position with Australian health lobbyist group, Catholic Health Australia. In 1994 he became the CEO of the group, a role in which he remained for nearly 14 years.

On 10 December 2007 it was announced that Sullivan would be moving to the Australian Medical Association to take up the leading position of Secretary-General, a role in which he began on 6 February 2008 replacing former Secretary-General Kerry Gallagher.

Sullivan was appointed CEO of the Truth, Justice and Healing Council in 2012, which he remained in the position of until he entered retirement in late 2018.

In 2019, Sullivan retired to act as a board member throughout different Catholic organisations operating within Australia, including Mercy Health.

== Order of Australia ==
In June 2020, Sullivan was announced on the Queen's Birthday Honours list to receive the honour of Officer of the Order of Australia, general division. Sullivan received the honour for his numerous services to the community throughout his career "particularly through social justice and legislative reform initiatives, and to health and aged care".

Speaking to The Guardian, Sullivan spoke on his honours, stating the acknowledgement was "wonderful", furthering to say "if my efforts have been recognised here, what’s really happening is the plight of those I’ve worked for, and their value in society, is now being recognised".
