= Rabindranath (album) =

Rabindranath রবীন্দ্রনাথ

Studio album by Shironamhin
- Released: 3 March 2010
- Recorded: 2010
- Length: 37:31
- Label: Laser Vision

Shironamhin chronology
Bondho Janala (2009)	Rabindranath রবীন্দ্রনাথ (2010)	Shironamhin (2013)

Rabindranath is the fourth album by the Bengali rock band Shironamhin. Laser Vision released the album on 2010 in Bangladesh.

The album's eleven songs are inspired by Rabindranath Tagore, a Bengali polymath who reshaped his region's literature and music.

== Background ==
"We believe Rabindranath himself was a cultural institute for us."

—Shironamhin

Shironamhin Rabindranath is the fourth studio album of the band, featuring rock interpretations of Tagore's songs, known as Rabindra Sangeet. The band held that Rabindranath Tagore important for them culturally, especially as Bengalis. Lead vocalist Tanzir Tuhin studied the songs at Bulbul Lalitakala Academy (BAFA). As band member Zia noted, part of the motivation in making this album was the feeling that many of their fans, particularly adolescents, were unfamiliar with Rabindra Sangeet, and hope that it would revitalise interest in Tagore.

== Track listing ==
All songs was written by Rabindranath Tagore.

No.	Title	Length
1.	"Gram Chhara Oi Ranga Matir Poth"	4:51
2.	"Purano Sei Diner Kotha"	3:28
3.	"Shangana Gogone"	4:37
4.	"Fule Fule"	3:39
5.	"Kichu Bolbo Bole Eshechilem"	3:21
6.	"Jete Jete Akla Pothe"	3:46
7.	"Sokatore Oi Kadiche Sokole"	5:31
8.	"Tumi Ki Keboli Chobi"	3:29
9.	"Sudhu Tomar Bani Noy Go"	4:19

Track listing

== Personnel ==
- Tanzir Tuhin – vocals
- Ziaur Rahman Zia – bass guitar, khol, mridanga, dholok
- Kazi Ahmad Shafin – drums
- Diat Khan – guitar, banjo
- Razib – keyboard
- Tushar – guitar
