= Servite College =

School in Perth, Western Australia

Location
- 134 Cape Street, Tuart Hill, Perth, Western Australia; Australia; 31°54′10″S 115°49′59″E

Information
- Former name: St Philip's Regional High School for Boys
- Type: Independent co-educational secondary day school
- Motto: Becoming all we are created to be
- Religious affiliation: The Servite Order
- Denomination: Roman Catholicism
- Patron saints: St. Philip Benizi; St. Juliana Falconieri
- Established: 1958; 68 years ago (as St Phillip's Regional High School for Boys)
- Founder: The Servite Order
- Educational authority: WA Department of Education
- President: Father Peter Porteous OSM
- Principal: Michael Chiera
- Teaching staff: 90 (2024)
- Employees: 130 (2024)
- Years offered: 7–12
- Gender: Male, female
- Age range: 12–18
- Student to teacher ratio: 33:1
- Language: English
- Schedule: Hours vary
- Hours in school day: 6h 25m
- Campuses: Sarpi Science Centre Jack Shanahan Building Alexis Research Centre (2-stories) Seven Holy Founders Centre (Auditorium and Gymnasium) Montorsoli Arts Centre Nannup Campus (purchased rural campus)
- Houses: Annunziata; Our Lady of Sorrows; San Clemente; Senario; St Anthony's; St Mary's
- Colours: Green, gold, black and white
- Song: Servite's Unite
- Athletics: Northern Associated Schools; Associated and Catholic Colleges
- Athletics conference: ACC
- Annual tuition: varies depending on year level
- Website: www.servite.wa.edu.au

Servite College is an independent Roman Catholic co-educational secondary day school, located in the Perth suburb of Tuart Hill, Western Australia. The school is operated by the Servite Order. The principal of the college is Michael Chiera.

== History ==
Servite College was founded by members of the Servite Order, who arrived in Perth in late 1951. In 1958 the Servite Friars established St. Philip’s Regional High School for Boys in Tuart Hill. It was named after St. Philip Benizi, an early leader of the Servite Order, and one of the College's patron saints. The school opened with 95 students in two classrooms, educating boys in years 5 and 6. In 1968 the name was changed to Servite College, and in 1973 the College became the first co-educational Catholic secondary school in Western Australia, accepting female students from neighbouring St Kieran, now a Catholic primary school.

For the school's first two years, all teachers were priests or brothers. In 1960 the first lay teacher was employed; the first lay principal was Jack Shanahan, in 1976.

== Operations ==
=== School structure ===
The College is led by the College Council and College Executive. The Council provides strategic leadership and represents the diverse Servite community, including parents and business leaders. The Executive has oversight for all aspects of the school’s operations. Students are represented through a Student Executive, including the head boy and head girl, and leaders from Years 7 to 12 of community, sport, culture, ICT and ministry.

As of 2025, there are just over 1,030 students attending Servite College.

Upon enrolment students are assigned to one of six priories (or factions):

- Annunziata (gold)
- Senario (black)
- San Clemente (green)
- St Mary (blue)
- Our Lady of Sorrows (purple)
- St Anthony (red)

Each played a role in the history of the Servite Order that was founded in Florence in the 13th century by the Seven Holy Founders. Students are further divided into vertical homerooms of about 25 students from all year groups, along with their siblings.

=== Campus ===
The campus is located between Cape Street and Morgans Street in Tuart Hill, and comprises:

- Alexis Research Centre: library and classrooms
- Jack Shanahan wing: general classrooms
- Fra Paolo Sarpi Science wing: science labs and classrooms
- Learning Diversity Centre
- Seven Holy Founders Centre: gymnasium and auditorium
- Montorsoli Practical and Creative Art Space
- St Philip Administration Centre

The College has undergone major works since 2015. In 2016 the Alexis Research Centre was remodelled to create a library space. In 2020 the central courtyard was excavated to provide a new piazza between classrooms and some original buildings refurbished. The Seven Holy Founders Centre hosts a gymnasium with rock climbing wall, a dance studio, weights room and a 200 seat auditorium drama and musical productions.

2020 also saw the opening of a new Learning Diversity Centre to replace the Blessed Joachim Centre, a purpose-built space for students with different needs and abilities, including specific learning disorders. It has facilities to teach practical skills for independent living.

The central area of the campus is a landscaped space for students to gather and socialise. A large arts space is located in a separate building on the northern side of Cape Street catering for visual and fine arts, design technologies (woodwork, cooking, fabrics) and applied information technologies.

The College has access to nearby Grenville Oval for sporting activities, and recently acquired the adjacent 25m outdoor swimming pool.

Servite College sport and swimming carnival days are held at the State Athletics Centre.

In 2020 the College purchased a 55 acre rural campus near Nannup, the south west of Western Australia. Known as the Monte Senario Campus, the site is used for camps and retreats, and sleeps 60 students.

In 2025, Servite built new carparks, a basketball court, and a multi-purpose playing field. Construction of a new gymnasium and a learning hub named the Montorsoli Building are planned to begin in late 2025. A new administration building and chapel are also planned in future.

=== Education ===
The College offers programs for both university entry and vocational education and training.

The college offers choices of electives including The Arts (Media, Fine & Visual, Performing), Computer Studies (Digital Creator, Computer Studies, Rise of the Hackers + More), Sport (Outdoor Education), Business and Accounting, Wood Technologies, Food Science and more, for years 8-10.

== Athletics ==
Servite College competes in the Northern Associated Schools (NAS) league and the Associated Catholic Colleges' annual swimming and athletic carnivals. Its NAS competitors include Sacred Heart College, Chisholm College, Newman College and John XXIII College in Perth.

== Liverpool Football Club partnership ==
In February 2025, the college announced an exclusive and first Australian partnership with the Liverpool Football Club. The program is in collaboration with the Liverpool Football Club International Academy.

== Controversy ==
In September 2010 a Servite College teacher of religion, Aaron Patrick Baker, was sentenced in the Perth District Court after pleading guilty to counts of possessing 2,176 images and 102 videos of child pornography. Servite College terminated Baker's employment. Baker was given a custodial sentence of 15 months, with a nine month non-parole period and was ordered by the court to be put through psychological counselling and a sex offender treatment program.

In March 2019, Arthur Frank Mowle, was jailed for five years after pleading guilty to five charges resulting from the Royal Commission into Institutional Responses to Child Sexual Abuse. Mowle was working at Servite College when in 1986 he abused a Year 9 student on two occasions. The student suffered from migraines; Mowle placed his hand inside the boy's underwear, telling him: "It’s OK. Sometimes migraines are caused by issues in this area."

== Notable alumni and staff ==
- David Michael (politician)
- Francis J. Sullivan (past student and teacher)
- Justin Burford
- Alessandro Circati
- Nick Kommer (teacher)

== See also ==
- List of schools in the Perth metropolitan area
- Catholic education in Australia
