= Truth, Justice and Healing Council =

The Truth, Justice and Healing Council was established by the Australian Catholic Bishops Conference as a national co-ordinating body to oversee the church's engagement with the 2015-17 Royal Commission into Institutional Responses to Child Sexual Abuse and the pastoral and other ramifications that arose from the sexual abuse which it was called to investigate.

== Personnel ==
The council was chaired by the Honourable Barry O'Keefe AM QC until his 2014 death.

He was succeeded by the Honourable Neville Owen, a former judge, barrister and solicitor, and Francis J. Sullivan was appointed as CEO.
