= Avash =

Bangladeshi musical group

Avash আভাস
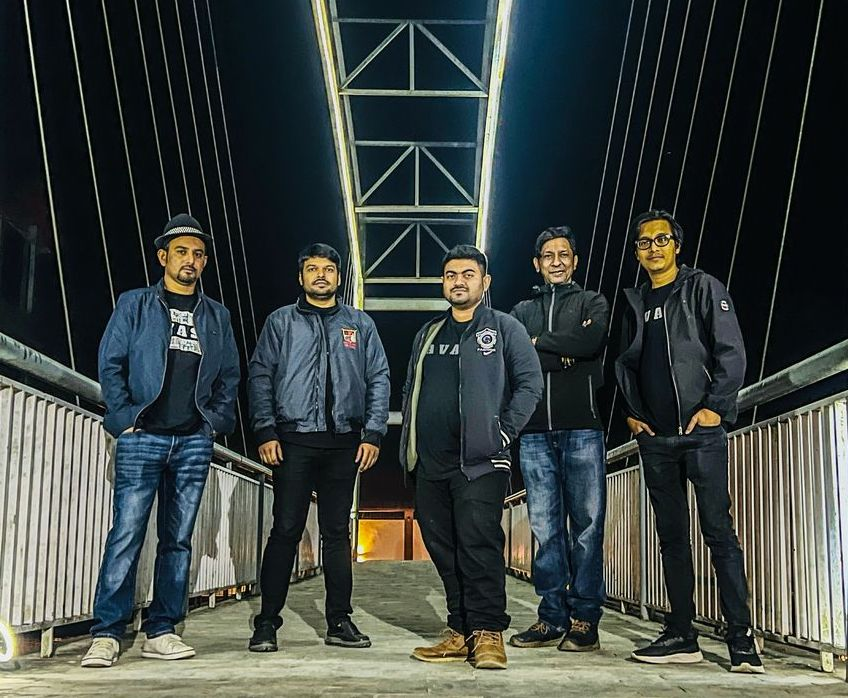

Background information
- Origin: Dhaka, Bangladesh
- Genres: Rock
- Years active: 2025
- Label: ME Label
- Members: Tanzir Tuhin; Raajue Sheikh; Heemel Shariar; Arafat Shawon; Rashed Jony
- Past members: Sumon Monjurul; Shawon Kaium; Rinku Imam
- Website: www.avash.net

Avash (English: Hint) is a Dhaka-based Bangladeshi rock band formed on 16 December 2017. The band was co-founded by Tanzir Tuhin and Raajue Sheikh. As of 2023, the band has released five singles.

== History ==
=== Formation ===
In 2017, Tanzir Tuhin, former lead vocalist of the band Shironamhin, became embroiled in controversy, and left the band on 7 October. On 16 December of the same year, (Note: The band declare its official commencement on 16 December 2017. (Primary source)) Tuhin (vocals), former bassist of Obscure Raajue Sheikh (bass), Sumon Monjurul (lead), Rinku Imam (drums), Shawon Kaium (keyboards)- formed the band Avash. On 1 February 2018, the band performed their first live performance on the open stage at Jahangirnagar University.

The band released their debut single "Manush-1" on 15 May 2018. Later, on 27 January 2019, they released self-titled track "Avash". The group's third single, "Bastob", was released on 23 February in 2020. The music video for the song was directed by Arifur Rahman. In January 2021 they released their latest single "Anath", which has an animated video. In 2023, the band released their 5th single "Camera" with a lyrical music video.

== Discography ==
Avash discography
- Singles: 5
- Music videos: 3

=== Singles ===
Title	Year	Note
"Manush-1"	2018	first solo
"Avash"	2019	self titled
"Bastob"	2020	
"Anath"	2021	
"Camera"	2023	
"Shotta"	2025	

== Members ==
=== Current ===
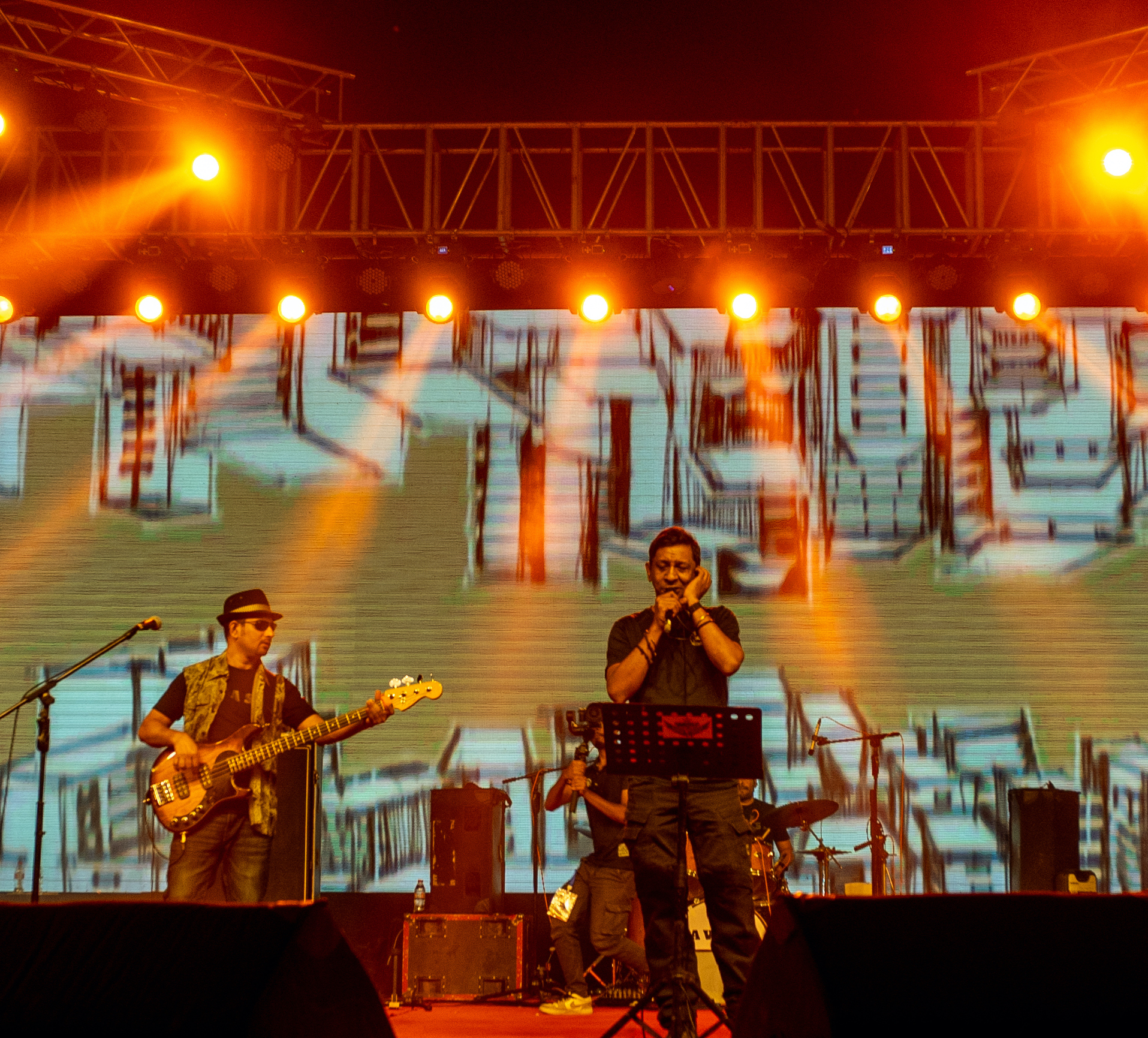
Avash performing live

- Tanzir Tuhin (2017–present) – Vocals
- Raajue Sheikh (2017–present) – Bass
- Heemel Shariar (2022–present) – Guitar
- Arafat Shawon (2022–present) – Keys
- Rashed Jony (2024–present) – Drums

=== Past ===
- Sumon Monjurul (2017–2022) – Lead guitar
- Shawon Kaium (2017–2022) – Keyboards
- Rinku Imam (2017–2023) – Drums
