= Icche Ghuri =

Ichchhe Ghuri ইচ্ছে ঘুড়ি

Studio album by Shironamhin
- Released: 1 May 2006
- Recorded: 2006, G-Series
- Length: 50:34

Shironamhin chronology
Jahaji (2004)	Ichchhe Ghuri ইচ্ছে ঘুড়ি (2006)	Bondho Janala (2009)

Ichchhe Ghuri (English: Ship-borne) is the second album by the Bengali psychedelic rock band Shironamhin. G-Series released the album on 1 May 2006 in Bangladesh.

== Background ==
Ichchhe Ghuri, was 2nd album by Shironamhin released by the record label co. G-Series on 1 May 2006.

== Track listing ==
Of the album's ten songs, five were written by Ziaur Rahman Zia, two were written by Farhan. Three were written by Tanzir Tuhin and Tusar. Various guest artists were also involved in the creation of this album with Jubaer from Purbo Poshchim on flutes, Tipu from Warfaze on percussion, Asad from Meghdol on keyboards, Faria on backing vocals and Pinu Sen Das on Tabla.

No.	Title	Lyrics	Music	Singer(s)	Length
1.	"Borosha (বরষা)"	Farhan Karim, Tanzir Tuhin	Farhan, Yasir Tushar	Tuhin	5:01
2.	"Pakhi (পাখি)"	Ziaur Rahman Zia	Zia	Tuhin	4:15
3.	"Cafeteria (ক্যাফেটেরিয়া)"	Zia	Zia, Tushar, Farhan	Tuhin	4:19
4.	"Swadesh (স্বদেশ)"	Farhan	Farhan, Tushar	Farhan	4:02
5.	"Voboghure Jhor (ভবঘুরে ঝড়)"	Zia	Zia	Tuhin	4:10
6.	"Ruposhi Nogor (রূপসী নগর)"	Zia, Tuhin	Zia, Tushar	Tuhin	3:21
7.	"Nishongo (নিঃসঙ্গ)"	Tushar	Tushar	Tuhin	3:23
8.	"Onno Keu (অন্য কেউ)"	Farhan	Farhan	Farhan	5:10
9.	"Onek Asha Niye (অনেক আশা নিয়ে)"	Zia	Zia	Tuhin	5:08
10.	"Icche Ghuri (ইচ্ছে ঘুড়ি)"	Zia	Zia	Tuhin	4:47
11.	"Ditiyo Jibon (দ্বিতীয় জীবন)"	Zia, Farhan, Tushar	Tushar	Farhan	6:56

== Personnel ==
- Tanzir Tuhin — vocal
- Ziaur Rahman Zia — bass guitar
- Farhan Karim — sarod, vocal
- Kazi Ahmad Shafin — drums
- Tushar — guitar
- Razib — keyboard

=== Guest members ===
- Jubaer — flutes
- Sheikh Monirul Alam Tipu — percussion
- Asad — keyboards
- Faria — backing vocals
- Pinu Sen Das — tabla
