= Mark Stevenson (epidemiologist) =

Australian epidemiologist

- Born: February 10, 1964 (age 62)
- Education: Master of Public Health; Doctor of Philosophy (Distinction)
- Alma mater: The University of Western Australia; Curtin University
- Occupations: Epidemiologist, author and academic
- Known for: Epidemiology, road injury, public health, urban health
- Scientific career
- Institutions: World Health Organization; Urban Analytica; The University of Melbourne
- Thesis: A study of the distribution and determinants of childhood pedestrian injuries in Perth, Western Australia (1994)

Mark Stevenson (born February 10, 1964) is an Australian epidemiologist, author, and academic. He is a professor of Urban Transport and Public Health at The University of Melbourne, where he directs the Transport, Health, and Urban Systems Research Lab. Additionally, he serves as an International Scholar at Tongji University, while also working as an Advisor for injury to the Director General of the World Health Organization and Chief Scientist of Urban Analytica.

Stevenson's research encompasses epidemiology pertaining to both transport safety and public health. He has authored over 300 publications, including The Scientific Basis of Injury Prevention and Control. In addition, he has served as an advisor on policy matters for both Australian federal and state governments. For his work on injury prevention in Australia, he received both the Australian National Road Safety Award and the Australian Injury Prevention Network Award.

Stevenson was appointed a Fellow of the Australian Academy of Health and Medical Sciences in 2022 and a Lifetime Fellow of the Australasian College of Road Safety. He served as an Associate Editor of Injury Prevention.

== Education and early career ==
Stevenson completed his undergraduate studies in New Zealand. He then completed a Postgraduate Diploma in Health Science majoring in Epidemiology and Biostatistics from Curtin University in 1987, followed by a Master of Public Health in 1988, and held positions as Senior Lecturer, Lecturer, and Senior Tutor at the School of Public Health at Curtin University from 1989 to 1995. He graduated with a Doctor of Philosophy from The University of Western Australia (UWA) in 1995 and served his Postdoctoral Fellowship at Harvard School of Public Health.

== Career ==
Stevenson assumed the role of Senior Lecturer and Head of the Department of Epidemiology and Biostatistics at Curtin University in 1997, later moving to UWA, where he served as Associate Professor and Director of the Injury Research Centre until 2003. Following this, he served as a professor of Injury Prevention at The University of Sydney and subsequently served as a Professor and Director at the Accident Research Centre at Monash University from 2010 to 2015. Since 2018, he has served as an International Scholar at Tongji University in Shanghai and is a professor of Urban Transport and Public Health at the University of Melbourne, an appointment he holds across the Melbourne Schools of Design, Engineering, and Population and Global Health, and is the director of the Transport, Health, and Urban Systems Research Lab there as well.

Stevenson served as an Epidemiologist at the US Centers for Disease Control and Prevention in 1998, and held the position of Senior Director of Research and Development at The George Institute for Global Health in Sydney, where he also directed the Injury and Trauma Care Division. From 2007 to 2022, he held National Health & Medical Research Council Research Fellowships. Since 2008, he has served as an advisor for injury to the director general of the World Health Organization and also holds the appointment of Chief Scientist and co-founder of Urban Analytica a data analytics company focused on sustainable transport solutions.

== Research ==
Stevenson has concentrated his research efforts on increasing public awareness of transportation safety, with a particular focus on preventing road injuries in urban settings and implementing transport policies to promote population health.

=== Transport safety ===
Stevenson's highly cited publications and advocacy efforts have influenced transport and public health policies, prompting legislative changes. He conducted a large-scale study on mobile phone use while driving, revealing a three-fold increased crash risk across all driver demographics which led to legislative changes in Australia, New Zealand, Canada, USA, and UK. From 2007 to 2013, he led a case-control study on sleepiness, sleep disorders, and the work environment in heavy vehicle crashes, influencing the Australian Government's Road Safety Remuneration Bill 2011 and Fair Work Legislation Amendment Bill 2023 to mitigate driver risk-taking behaviors. His advocacy, including media appearances and opinion editorials, led to the implementation of graduated driver licensing schemes (GLS) with peer passenger and night driving restrictions across a number of Australian States. He also led a study on reducing driving behaviors contributing to crashes by providing individualized real-time feedback via a smartphone app, along with financial incentives.

=== Injury prevention ===
Stevenson emphasized the role of injury as a primary cause of death and disability worldwide prioritizing comprehension of essential scientific foundations for effective harm mitigation in his book titled The Scientific Basis of Injury Prevention and Control. In his study on the aftermath of the May 2008 earthquake in Wenchuan, he highlighted the widespread occurrence of injuries, attributing them to significant loss of life and productivity, proposing low-cost prevention measures to deal with the public health issue of injury-related mortality and morbidity in China. In addition, he presented an overview of the injury severity score (ISS) and the new injury severity score (NISS), illustrated their statistical properties through descriptive analysis, revealing a positively skewed distribution with no improvement in skewness through transformation.

Stevenson's 2003 study was the first to demonstrate an almost 2-fold increased risk of child drowning in 3-sided (where the house acted as a barrier) versus 4-sided (isolated) fenced swimming pools. These findings influenced legislative changes regarding isolation pool fencing and were cited in the WHO's and UNICEF's World Report on Child Injury Prevention as key evidence for the effectiveness of isolation pool fencing in preventing child drowning.

=== Public health ===
Stevenson has contributed to epidemiological studies focused on identifying risk factors that promote health. He researched, with colleagues, the association between antibiotics and hospital-acquired Clostridioides difficile infections, highlighting the gaps in research because of incorrect control groups and emphasizing the need for well-designed studies to identify true risk factors. In collaborative efforts, he proposed eight interventions for healthier, more sustainable cities through urban planning, advocating for multisector leadership prioritizing health and livability. Employing a health impact assessment framework to analyze the effects of alternative land-use and transport policies, his research also showcased how the transition toward compact cities promotes health benefits in diabetes, cardiovascular disease, and respiratory disease.

On September 6, 2020, Stevenson's research lab presented modeling to the Victorian Premier, outlining a roadmap for managing the second wave of the COVID-19 crisis. It emphasized the significant impact of the chosen trigger for easing public health restrictions on the risk of another lockdown by Christmas. These recommendations were adopted by the governments of Australia and New Zealand.

== Awards and honors ==
- 2001 – Award for Achievement in Injury Prevention Research, Australian Injury Prevention Network
- 2008 – Lifetime Fellow, Australasian College of Road Safety
- 2022 – Fellow, Australian Academy of Health and Medical Sciences

== Bibliography ==
=== Selected books ===
- The Scientific Basis of Injury Prevention and Control (2004) ISBN 978-0957861794

=== Selected articles ===
- Stevenson, M., Segui-Gomez, M., Lescohier, I., Di Scala, C., & McDonald-Smith, G. (2001). An overview of the injury severity score and the new injury severity score. Injury Prevention, 7(1), 10–13.
- Thomas, C., Stevenson, M., & Riley, T. V. (2003). Antibiotics and hospital-acquired Clostridium difficile-associated diarrhoea: a systematic review. Journal of antimicrobial chemotherapy, 51(6), 1339–1350.
- McEvoy, S., Stevenson, M., McCartt, A., Woodward, M., Haworth, C., Palamara, P., & Cercarelli, R. (2005). Role of mobile phones in motor vehicle crashes resulting in hospital attendance: A case-crossover study. British Medical Journal, 331, 428–432.
- Wang, S. Y., Li, Y. H., Chi, G. B., Xiao, S. Y., Ozanne-Smith, J., Stevenson, M., & Phillips, M. R. (2008). Injury-related fatalities in China: an under-recognised public-health problem. The lancet, 372(9651), 1765–1773.
- Stevenson, M., Thompson, J., de Sá, T. H., Ewing, R., Mohan, D., McClure, R., ... & Woodcock, J. (2016). Land use, transport, and population health: estimating the health benefits of compact cities. The lancet, 388(10062), 2925–2935.
- Giles-Corti, B., Vernez-Moudon, A., Reis, R., Turrell, G., Dannenberg, A. L., Badland, H., ... & Owen, N. (2016). City planning and population health: a global challenge. The lancet, 388(10062), 2912–2924.
