= Shironamhin (album) =

Shironamhin Untitled as Always

Studio album by Shironamhin
- Released: 19 July 2013
- Recorded: 2013; Incursion Music
- Genre: Psychedelic
- Length: 48:46
- Label: Siren
- Producer: Qinetic Music

Shironamhin chronology
Rabindranath (2010)	Shironamhin; Untitled as Always (2013)	Shironahmhin – Upcoming – Untitled as Always (2017-2020)

== Background ==
Shironamhin tried to compile confession, demand, rage, hope & anticipation in their self-titled album to invite a new light through old windows. From lyrical point of view, this album is more specific on topic, searching the positive sides of a negative living. Musically Shironamhin tried western classic orchestration based on violin, cello, contrabass section fused with rock guitar, bass & drums accompaniment. Shironamhin recalls all the members & persons who worked for Shironamhin once and forever, expressed their gratitude to those who carried Shironamhin this long & dedicated their songs to the listeners whom Shironamhin is comfortable to call friends. Shironamhin will remain untitled as always.

== Synopsis ==
At past projects, the band has infused traditional classical instruments such as sarod, esraj, mandira and dotara with their distinctive style of rock. In the fifth self-titled album, they have used some classical instruments will be played along with guitar, bass and drums.

== Track listing ==
No.	Title	Lyrics	Music	Singer(s)	Length
1.	"Abar Hashimukh (আবার হাসিমুখ)"	Ziaur Rahman Zia	Zia	Tanzir Tuhin	5:39
2.	"Bristikabbyo (বৃষ্টিকাব্য)"	Zia	Zia	Tuhin	5:03
3.	"Kichu Kotha (কিছু কথা)"	Zia	Zia	Tuhin	4:10
4.	"Pori (পরী)"	Tuhin	Kazi Shafin Ahmad, Tuhin	Tuhin	4:38
5.	"Rod Canvas (রোদ ক্যানভাস)"	Zia	Diat Khan	Tuhin	3:55
6.	"Shonshon, Jodio Kashbon (শন্শন্, যদিও কাশবন)"	Zia	Shafin	Tuhin	4:19
7.	"Ahoto Kichu Golpo (আহত কিছু গল্প)"	Tuhin	Tuhin	Tuhin	5:07
8.	"Michil (মিছিল)"	Zia	Diat, Zia	Tuhin	5:13
9.	"Chithi (চিঠি)"	Zia	Shafin, Zia	Tuhin	4:01
10.	"Aatotayee (আততায়ী)"	Zia	Zia	Tuhin	6:37

== Personnel ==
Band personnel

- Tanzir Tuhin – Vocal
- Ziaur Rahman Zia – Bass, violin, cello
- Kazi Ahmad Shafin – Drums
- Diat Khan – Guitar
- Rashel Kabir – Keyboard

Guest personnel

- Moumon – Acoustic Guitar
- Razib – Keyboard
- Sharif – Violin

Production personnel

- Recorded and Mixed by – Ziaur Rahman Zia
- Recorded at – Studio Gaanbaz, DTM, Pray Shironamhin
- Cover – Tanzir Tuhin
- Photography – Mortuza Alom
- Graphics (Album Art) – Ziaur Rahman Zia
