= Padma Patar Jol =

2015 Bangladeshi film by Tanmay Tansen

- Theatrical Release Poster
- পদ্ম পাতার জল
- Directed by: Tonmay Tansen
- Written by: Latiful Islam; Tonmoy Tansen
- Produced by: Sheikh Asifur Rahman; Razib Rayhan; Raju Ahmed
- Starring: Bidya Sinha Saha Mim; Mamnun Hasan Emon; Tariq Anam Khan; Amit Hasan; Nipun Akter
- Cinematography: Mahfuzur Rahman Khan
- Edited by: Latiful Islam Shibli
- Music by: Ahmed Imtiaz Bulbul; S I Tutul
- Production company: Tripod Studios
- Distributed by: Tripod Studios
- Release date: 18 July 2015
- Country: Bangladesh
- Language: Bengali

Padma Patar Jol is a 2015 Bangladeshi Bengali language historical romantic drama film written by Latiful Islam Shibli and directed by Tonmoy Tansen. The film is produced by Sheikh Asifur Rahman, as his production company Tripod Films funded the project. The plot is based on a British colonial era story. It stars Mamnun Hasan Emon, Bidya Sinha Saha Mim, Tariq Anam Khan and Amit Hasan in lead roles with Chitralekha Guho, Nima Rahman and Nipun Akter appearing in supporting roles. The film was released on 18 July 2015.

== Plot ==
The film takes place during the late 19th century in Bengal. During that period of time, Zaminders had absolute power and controlled every aspect of common people's lives. Rizwan is the only son of a very powerful Zaminder who resides in the rural part of Bengal. As Rizwan grows up, His father sends him away to the city for higher education, however Rizwan has no interest in his heart to seek higher education as he aspires to become a great poet. As he progresses with his life in the city, one day his friends persuade him to go to a Baizi Bari's Jhumri Mahal, where all the Raqasa (Dancers) reside.

As he stays there for few days, he comes across a very graceful Baiji named Rupak. As he gets to know her, he falls in love with her although it is forbidden for Baiji's to get involved in any kind of relationship, for he was a Zaminder and she was a dancer, but She also falls in love with him after all. Going opposite the social norm, many obstacles come between them and overpower their love. As they fail to unite while alive, Rupak and Rizwan die and reunite after death.

== Cast ==
- Bidya Sinha Saha Mim as Phooleswari/Rupak, a Baizi Dancer and love interest of Rizwan.
- Emon as Rizwan, Son of a powerful zaminder who aspires to be a poet. He is in love with a Baizi dancer.
- Tariq Anam Khan, a powerful zaminder and father of Rizwan. He is very torturous and against Riwzan's romantic relation with Rupak.
- Chitralekha Guha, Mother of Rizwan who dislikes her husband's judgement but is too afraid to tell him.
- Nipun Akter, A Baizi dancer and friend of Rupak.
- Amit Hasan, the main antagonist who wants to marry Phooleswari.
- Nima Rahman, as the guardian and key holder of Baizi Bari.
- Rumana Swarna
- Abu Hena Roni
- Nayan Khan
- Ananta Hira
- Pirzada Shahidul Harun

== Production ==
The writer of the film Latiful Islam was inspired by the story of Baizi Bari; Tradition Dance House during British Colonial Era, set during late 1800 and early 1900 in Bengal. The film develops around a love tale during the colonial period. Shayan Chowdhury Arnob, Shironamhin, and Chirkut have composed the film soundtrack purely based on the theme of the period film is set on.

The film was shot in various place across Bangladesh. The film's principal photography began in mid 2013. The first schedule was shot at Tangail. The film was also done in Old Dhaka and few scenes were taken inside BFDC Studios in Dhaka. The film was shot for over four months.

The leading cast for the film Mamnun Hasan Emon and Mim Bidya Sinha Saha was finalised during 2012, However, due to few issues, the film was stalled until 2014. Padma Patar Jol is the second collaboration between Mamnun Hasan Emon and Mim Bidya Sinha Saha after Jonakir Aalo (2014).

== Soundtrack ==
Music for the film was given by Ahmed Imtiaz Bulbul, S I Tutul, Shironamhin, Shayan Chowdhury Arnob, Adit Ozbert and Chirkut. The lyrics are penned by Latiful Islam Shibli and Sharmin Sultana. The soundtrack album features numerous singer such as Nazmun Munira Nancy, Dilshad Nahar Kona, Sabrina Porshi, Elita Karim, Shayan Chowdhury Arnob and others.

Padma Patar Jol (2015)

Soundtrack album by Ahmed Imtiaz Bulbul, S I Tutul
- Released: 10 June 2015
- Recorded: 2015
- Genre: Feature film soundtrack
- Length: 32:55
- Director: Ahmed Imtiaz Bulbul

No.	Title	Artist	Length
1.	"Alokito Saradin"	Asif Akbar, Sabrina Porshi	5:08
2.	"Amar Rupkotha Jibon"	Emon	2:38
3.	"Podmo Patar Jol"	Shironamhin (Tanzir Tuhin)	4:47
4.	"Gopone Gopone"	Nancy, Kona, Adit Ozbert, Shoeb	6:12
5.	"Akakini Tara"	Elita Karim	4:23
6.	"Tir Mero Na"	Aneesha	5:08
7.	"Tomay Ami"	Arnob, Kona	4:17
