= David Indermaur =

Australian psychologist

David Indermaur is an Australian clinical psychologist and writer.

== Education and career ==
Indermaur graduated from the University of Western Australia, obtaining a masters in clinical psychology in 1979 and a Doctor of Law in 1997. In 1976 he worked as a psychologist for prisoners in Western Australia, researching public views on punishment for crimes and court sentencing. In the 1980s and 1990s Indermaur worked on criminal investigations involving drugs and violent crime. His research involves the decision making processes of violent crime offenders in Australia. Later in the 1990s, Indermaur researched crime prevention, domestic violence, and road rage. From 1989 until 1993 he was a lecturer at Edith Cowan University. He has also researched how the fear of crime negatively impacts communities and quality of life.

On 20 April 2010 Indermaur was a speaker at the Rally For Your Rights event, organized by Search For Your Rights, where he criticized stop and search laws.

== Personal life ==
Indermaur is a member of the In der Maur family. He lives in Nedlands, Western Australia.

== Bibliography ==
- Are we becoming more violent? A comparison of trends in violent and property offenses in Australia and Western Australia (1995)
- Violent Crime in Australia: Patterns and Politics (2000)
- Penal Populism and Public Opinion (2003)
- Confidence in the Criminal Justice System, Trends and Issues in Crime and Criminal Justice (2009)
- The Ethics of Research with Prisoners (2018)
