= Bondho Janala =

Bondho Janala বন্ধ জানালা

Studio album by Shironamhin
- Released: 13 April 2009
- Recorded: 2009 G-series; Agnibina
- Length: 47:20

Shironamhin chronology
Ichchhe Ghuri (2006)	Bondho Janala বন্ধ জানালা (2009)	Rabindranath (2010)

Bondho Janala (Bengali: বন্ধ জানালা English: Closed Window) is the third album by the Bengali psychedelic rock band Shironamhin. G-Series released the album on 13 April 2009 in Bangladesh.

== Background ==
Bondho Janala was a bit challenging for Shironamhin as they were very much used to sarod sound compositions. In the album they had to explore many more acoustic instruments like Esraj, Silver Flute, Trumpet etc. as the album was enriched with vivid orchestration. Lyrically Shironamhin tried to work on their already established genre of urban life talks with some bigger aspects and along with historical events or movements. Bus Stoppage was based on a regular life happening around a bus stop in your very own locality; the newspaper stand, the billboards displaying contest winner beauties, the hawkers, the little girl selling flowers in the street who could touch the glasses of the cars but couldn't touch the hearts inside or the corporate guy completely missing the enormous sky full of stars above his head while distressed with selling his dreams now and then for the agony of life.

== Track listing ==
Of the album's ten songs, four were written by Ziaur Rahman Zia and two were written by Tanzir Tuhin. Two songs were written by Tushar and Kathuria, member of the band along with Zia and Tuhin.

No.	Title	Lyrics	Music	Singer(s)	Length
1.	"Bondho Janala"	Ziaur Rahman Zia	Zia	Tanzir Tuhin	4:03
2.	"Bullet Kingba Kobita"	Zia	Zia	Tanzir Tuhin	4:33
3.	"Shurjo"	Tanzir Tuhin	Tushar	Tanzir Tuhin	4:39
4.	"Eka"	Tushar	Tushar	Tanzir Tuhin	4:58
5.	"Shohosha Deep"	Tushar	Tushar	Tanzir Tuhin	4:28
6.	"Bus Stoppage"	Zia	Zia	Tanzir Tuhin	4:22
7.	"Suprovat"	Zia	Yasir Tushar	Tanzir Tuhin	5:08
8.	"Bangladesh"	Zia, Kazi Shafin Ahmad	Shafin, Zia	Tanzir Tuhin	4:21
9.	"Bhalobasha Megh"	Zia, Kathuria	Zia	Tanzir Tuhin	4:25
10.	"Porichoy"	Tanzir Tuhin	Tanzir Tuhin	Tanzir Tuhin	3:51

== Personnel ==
- Tanzir Tuhin – Vocal
- Ziaur Rahman Zia – Bass
- Kazi Ahmad Shafin – Drums
- Diat Khan – Guitar
- Rashel Kabir – Keyboard
