= Neville Owen =

Australian judge

The Honourable Justice Neville Owen

Justice of the Supreme Court of Western Australia
- In office 1991–2010

Chancellor of The University of Notre Dame Australia
- In office 1989 – 30 June 2008
- Preceded by: inaugural
- Succeeded by: Michael Quinlan

Chair of the Chair of The Truth Justice and Healing Council, Australian Catholic Bishops Conference, Roman Catholic Church in Australia
- Incumbent
- Assumed office April 2014
- Preceded by: Barry O'Keefe

Personal details
- Born: Neville John Owen
- Children: Five (one deceased)
- Education: The University of Western Australia
- Profession: Jurist

Neville John Owen, a former senior judge of the Court of Appeal of the Supreme Court of Western Australia, is the Chair of The Truth, Justice and Healing Council since 2014, a body established by the Australian Catholic Bishops Conference to oversee the Roman Catholic Church in Australia's engagement with the Royal Commission into Institutional Responses to Child Sexual Abuse and the pastoral and other ramifications that arose from a series of sexual abuse scandals within the Catholic Church in Australia and its associated institutions.

== Career ==
Graduating from the University of Western Australia in 1968 with a Bachelor of Laws (honours), Owen practiced as a barrister and solicitor from 1972 to 1991 and was a partner in a law firm, now known as Clayton Utz. Owen's practice was broadly based in commercial law and was closely involved with matters relating to corporate structures, insolvency, trusts and equity, commercial litigation and media law. In 1991 he was appointed to the Supreme Court of Western Australia, the highest ranking court in the Australian state of Western Australia. In 2005 he was appointed as an inaugural member of the Court of Appeals Division.

From 2001 through to 2003, Owen headed HIH Insurance Royal Commission. In July 2003 he started the three-year hearing into Alan Bond's Bell group of companies. It was one of the nation's longest running and most expensive civil actions.

Owen retired in 2010 after 19 years on the bench of the Supreme Court of Western Australia.

A Roman Catholic, Justice Owen is the inaugural Chancellor of the University of Notre Dame Australia who served from 1989 until 2008. In 2014 he was appointed by the Roman Catholic Australian Catholic Bishops Conference to chair The Truth Justice and Healing Council as the Church's official coordinating agency with the Royal Commission into Institutional Responses to Child Sexual Abuse.

== See also ==
- Judiciary of Australia
