= Transportation and health =

Public health related to transportation

Transportation and health is a branch of public health dealing with efforts to improve health outcomes related to transportation.

== Background and safety measures ==
Transportation is a core part of a functioning society, and managing the health impact of transportation falls under the branch of public health. Many measures have been taken over the years to improve health outcomes related to transportation. Accidents are the third leading cause of death in the United States, and one quarter of those are motor vehicle accidents, accounting for 40,327 deaths per year. Starting in the 1960s, campaigns began popping up all over the United States to promote motor vehicle safety. These campaigns used a multi-pronged approach to increase the safety of automobiles. They lobbied locally and in Washington DC to mandate certain safety features such as airbags and seatbelts, both of which reduce injury in the event of an accident. These campaigns also used a variety of public health intervention methods to spread awareness of motor vehicle safety. In the states where interventions took place, seat belt usage skyrocketed. Motor vehicles contribute greatly to aggregate emissions all over the globe, which can have serious negative impacts on the health of the population. In the 1970s, the Nixon administration created the Environmental Protection Agency as well as passing the Clean Air Act. Both of these measures not only helped to reduce the amount of harmful emissions being produced by motor vehicles in the US, but they also helped improve health measures. For example, it was found that reducing the amount of lead in gasoline directly correlated with decreasing blood lead content from 1976 to 1980.

Biking is an essential form of transportation for many citizens. Biking comes with its own set of health benefits and detriments. Biking is one of the few forms of transportation that keeps the traveler active. This activity gives the rider a cardiovascular workout increasing muscle strength and joint mobility while reducing stress levels and body fat content. Although biking does have wonderful health outcomes for the body, the risks biking poses does have an impact on overall health outcomes. While helmets do protect the rider in the event of crash or accident, the mere presence of a helmet increases the likelihood of a rider getting into an accident with a car. More bike-specific infrastructure such as bike lanes and bike paths is needed to keep bikers safe. Commercial air travel ranks as the safest form of transportation in terms of deaths per billion miles traveled, with .07 deaths/billion miles traveled, followed by bus travel at .11 deaths/billion miles traveled and train transport at .43 deaths/billion miles traveled. Automotive travel ranked as the most dangerous with 7.3 deaths/billion miles traveled.

== Air quality and emissions production ==
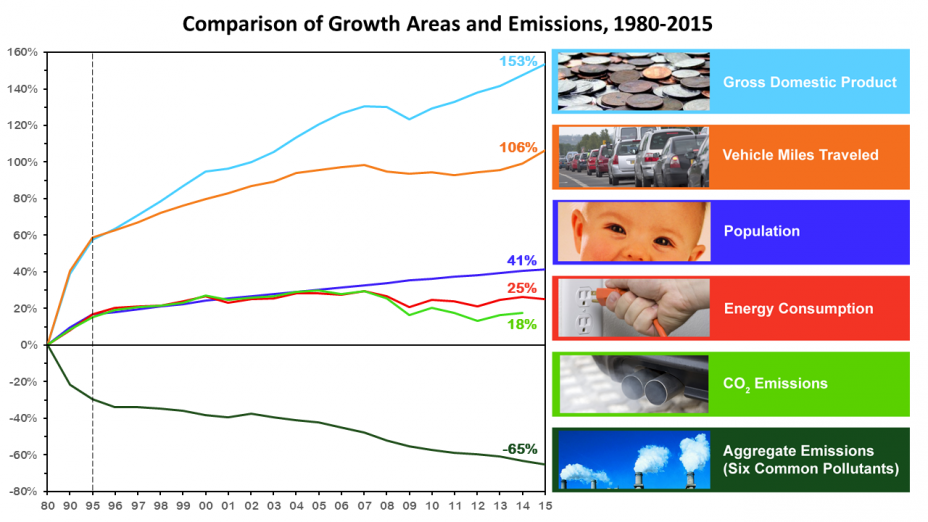
Comparison of Growth Areas and Emissions 1980–2015, US

The six main pollutants monitored by the EPA that can have serious health consequences are particulate matter, ground-level ozone, lead, carbon monoxide, sulfur dioxide and nitrogen dioxide. Particulate matter consists of a mix of solid and liquid matter such as dust, dirt, or smoke that makes up two categories, PM_{10} and PM_{2.5}, the former being anything smaller than 10 micrometers and the latter being anything smaller than 2.5 micrometers. PM_{10} can get deep within your lungs while PM_{2.5} is so small it can get into your blood stream both of which cause damage and is overall harmful for your health. When nitrogen oxides interact with volatile organic compounds near the surface of the Earth, ground-level ozone is formed which can cause a variety of respiratory issues and exacerbate existing conditions like COPD and asthma which is common in vulnerable populations such as the elderly and children. Lead is a soft metal that when introduced to the human body, can cause damage throughout many body systems including the nervous, cardiovascular, immune, and renal systems. Carbon monoxide is introduced into the air through combustion reactions, and when inhaled, the carbon monoxide mimics oxygen molecules and binds to hemoglobin, not allowing for proper oxygenation, which can exacerbate pre-existing conditions such as asthma and COPD. Sulfur dioxide and nitrogen dioxide both are synthesized through combustion reactions and have negative impacts on the respiratory systems. All six of the criteria air pollutants are created either directly or indirectly from combustion reactions of fossil fuels.

Measures have been taken starting in the 1970s to start to reduce the amount of pollutants in the air, thus aiming to improve health outcomes related to air quality. For example, the catalytic converter was introduced to the automotive industry. It functions by filtering exhaust from a combustion engine in a vehicle for potentially harmful gases and catalyzes reactions to transform them into less harmful chemicals such as water, carbon dioxide, and nitrogen. Also, reducing the amount of lead in gasoline did directly correlate with a decrease in blood lead content during a four-year period in the 1970s. Although continuous measures have been taken to reduce the emissions content due to cars, they still rank unfavorably compared with other forms of travel.

"In absolute terms, the picture is clear. Worldwide, road users account for about 71% of transport CO2 emissions, with railway companies making up less than 1.8%, next to 12.3% for aviation and 14.3% for shipping, according to the International Energy Agency and International Union of Railways."

In terms of emission production, bikes are the obvious leader in this category considering they produce nearly no emissions to run. They are also smaller and create less pollution in terms of production. On average, the production of a single bicycle creates around 530 pounds of carbon dioxide, which can be generally offset by about 400 miles of biking instead of driving. There are arguments that bikers need to consume more food, which leads to emissions productions in other ways and that drastically adds to the total emissions produced by bikers in comparison to drivers, but a biker would have to have a diet extremely high in beef consumption in order to substantially offset the emissions benefits of biking. Of course, like any other mode of transportation, feasibility and practicality play a role in the use of bikes in a different setting. Biking is impractical for long-distance journeys or journeys where one would need to bring many things with them. But, for the most part, biking is most practical in suburban and urban environments for short journeys. Over 60% car journeys in the US in 2008 were between 0–10 miles long. This statistic illustrates that bikes are a very feasible option for a lot of journeys in the US. On top of the feasibility of bike usage due to distance, biking is also the quickest way to travel around urban areas. Considering that 62.7% of the population of the US lives in cities, biking is a feasibility for a large percentage of the population.

== Urban centers and public transportation ==
Public transportation is broad term encompassing a wide variety of methods of transportation including commuter rails, light rails, heavy rails, trolleys, and buses. These diverse methods of transportation provides millions of Americans with a way to travel around the area in which they live. Public transportation as a whole has a variety of health benefits. Using public transportation makes a person more active, therefore making them more likely to be healthier and decreasing risk for diseases such as cardiovascular disease, hypertension, diabetes. Taking public transit makes a rider safer compared to drivers in personal vehicles. Public transit produces less emissions than cars which reduces levels in the air, decreasing risk for the harmful effects of emissions.
