= Taj Hashmi =

Bangladeshi academic and writer

- তাজ হাসমী تاج حاشمی
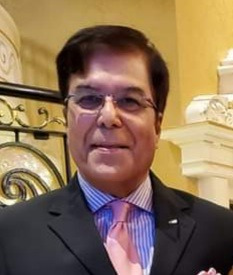
- Hashmi in 2025
- Born: Taj ul-Islam Hashmi; September 26, 1948 (age 78); Assam, India
- Occupation: Academic
- Children: 2
- Relatives: Karamat Ali Jaunpuri (great-grandfather)

Academic background
- Education: Dhaka College; University of Dhaka; University of Western Australia
- Thesis: Peasants and Politics in East Bengal, 1920-1947 (1987)

Academic work
- Institutions: DU; CU; Curtin; NUS; UBC; APCSS; APSU
- Notable works: Pakistan As A Peasant Utopia: The Communalization Of Class Politics In East Bengal, 1920-1947

Taj ul-Islam Hashmi, better known as Taj Hashmi, is a Bangladeshi academic and writer. He was a professor at prominent universities, and his work "Pakistan as a Peasant Utopia" is very popular among academics.

== Early life and education ==
Hashmi was born in September 26, 1948 in Assam, India later his family migrate East Bengal. He completed his bachelor and masters at the University of Dhaka in Islamic History and Culture. He did his PhD at the University of Western Australia in Modern South Asian History.

== Career ==
Hashmi taught Islamic and Modern South Asian History and Cultural Anthropology at various universities in Bangladesh, Australia, Singapore, US, and Canada.

From 1972 to 1981, Hashmi taught at the University of Dhaka. He also taught at the University of Chittagong. From 1987 to 1988, Hashmi taught at the Curtin University. From 1989 to 1998, he taught at the National University of Singapore.

Hashmi taught at the University of British Columbia from 2003 to 2004. He has also worked for four years as a professor of Security Studies at the U.S. Department of Defense, College of Security Studies at the Asia-Pacific Center for Security Studies in Honolulu, Hawaii.

Hashmi is a lecturer in security studies at Austin Peay State University. He is a member of the editorial board of Contemporary South Asia and also serves on the editorial board of the Journal of South Asian Studies. He has been a fellow of the Royal Asiatic Society of Great Britain and Ireland since 1997. He was a visiting fellow at the Centre for International Studies at University of Oxford and a fellow at the National Centre for South Asian Studies at Monash University in Australia.

Hashmi joined the Dhaka Tribune as a columnist in September 2024.

== Personal life ==
Hashmi lives in Toronto, Canada, and he is married with two children.

== Publications ==
Hashmi authored several books published by reputable publishers. His key works include The Aftermath of the Bangladesh Liberation War of 1971 (2024), which he co-edited, and Fifty Years of Bangladesh, 1971-2021, examining the nation's ongoing challenges. He critically examines class and communal identities in Pakistan as a Peasant Utopia (2019) and tackles global jihadism in Global Jihad and America (2014). His earlier works, like Women and Islam in Bangladesh (2000), highlight gender issues, while his Bengali book ঔপনিবেশিক বাংলা (1985) delves into colonial history. Hashmi's diverse scholarship enriches the discourse on identity, governance, and culture in South Asia. He wrote in Religious Radicalism and Security in South Asia (Chapter 3, pp. 34–71), published in Spring 2004 by the Asia-Pacific Center for Security Studies.

- Ranjan, Amit; Hashmi, Taj; Abbas, Mazhar, eds. (2024). The Aftermath of the Bangladesh Liberation War of 1971 (1st ed.). Taylor & Francis. doi:10.4324/9781003463627. ISBN 9781003463627.
- Hashmi, Taj (2022). Fifty Years of Bangladesh, 1971-2021: Crisis of Culture, Development, Governance, and Identity. Palgrave Macmillan. doi:10.1007/978-3-030-97158-8. ISBN 9783030971571.
- Hashmi, Taj (2019). Pakistan As A Peasant Utopia: The Communalization Of Class Politics In East Bengal, 1920-1947 (1st ed.). Routledge. ISBN 9780367297619.
- Hashmi, Taj (2014). Global Jihad and America: The Hundred-Year War Beyond Iraq and Afghanistan (1st ed.). SAGE Publications. ISBN 978-8132113782.
- Hashmi, Taj (2000). Women and Islam in Bangladesh: Beyond Subjection and Tyranny. Palgrave Macmillan. doi:10.1057/9780333993873. ISBN 9780333749593.
- Hashmi, Taj (1994). Mutalib, Hussin; Hashmi, Taj ul-Islam (eds.). Islam, Muslims and the Modern State. Palgrave Macmillan. doi:10.1007/978-1-349-14208-8. ISBN 978-0-333-66969-3.
- হাসমী, তাজ (1985). ঔপনিবেশিক বাংলা (in Bengali) (1st ed.). Calcutta: Papirus.

== See also ==
- List of Dhaka College alumni
- List of University of Dhaka alumni and faculty
- List of University of Western Australia people
