= Jahaji =

Jahaji জাহাজী

Studio album by Shironamhin
- Released: 1 November 2004
- Recorded: 15–30 December 2003
- Studio: Rabbit Communications Studio, Dhaka, Bangladesh
- Genre: Psychedelic rock; folk rock
- Length: 52:18
- Label: Rabbit Communications; G-Series
- Producer: Ziaur Rahman Zia

Shironamhin chronology
Jahaji জাহাজী (2004)	Ichchhe Ghuri (2006)

জাহাজী (Navigator) is the debut studio album by Bangladeshi rock band Shironamhin. The album was recorded in Rabbit Communications Studio between 15 and 30 December 2003. It was released on 1 November 2004 by Rabbit Communications in Dhaka.

Two of the album's songs, "হাসিমুখ (Smile Face)" and "লাল নীল গল্প (Red Blue Story)", became long-term mainstays of the band's live set list, while other songs were performed live only a handful of times.

== Background ==
Jahaji is based around the struggles of an urban lifestyle. The title track of the album states this. Shironamhin tried to portray the everyday life of a young middle-class career-seeking sailor in the Bronx. The cultural interest, the gossip in a crowded cityscape, the life of bu Dhaka.

== Release ==
In 2004, Shironamhin completed the album Jahaji. At first, in 2004, the record label company Rabbit Communications released the album. Later Bangladeshi record label company G-Series reproduced & released it on 2005.

== Track listing ==
Of the album's eleven songs, seven were written by Ziaur Rahman Zia, two were written by Tanzir Tuhin, and remaining were written by other members.

No.	Title	Lyrics	Music	Singer(s)	Length
1.	"Nodi (নদী)"	Tanzir Tuhin	Yasir Tushar, Tuhin	Tuhin	4:31
2.	"Hashimukh (হাসিমুখ)"	Ziaur Rahman Zia	Zia	Tuhin	4:14
3.	"Suvro Rangin (শুভ্র রঙ্গিন)"	Zia	Zia	Tuhin	4:03
4.	"Sohorer Kotha (শহরের কথা)"	Zia	Zia	Tuhin	3:48
5.	"Jahaji (জাহাজি)"	Zia	Zia	Tuhin	6:06
6.	"Shunno (শূন্য)"	Zia	Zia	Tuhin	4:42
7.	"Lal Neel Golpo (লাল নীল গল্প)"	Zia	Zia	Tuhin	4:26
8.	"Nishcup Adhar (নিশ্চুপ আঁধার)"	Zia, Farhan	Zia, Tushar	Farhan	4:35
9.	"Hoyna (হয়না)"	Tuhin	Tuhin	Tuhin	4:08
10.	"Ghum (ঘুম)"	Farhan	Farhan, Tushar	Farhan	5:10
11.	"Obak Vromon (অবাক ভ্রমন)" (Instrumental)				6:28

== Personnel ==
- Tanzir Tuhin – lead vocal
- Ziaur Rahman Zia – bass
- Farhan Karim – Sarod, vocal
- Tushar – Guitar
- Jewel – Guitar
- Shafin – Drums
