= Chanchal Khan =

Bangladeshi-Australian academic and singer

- Citizenship: Australian
- Education: Ph.D.
- Occupation: Musician
- Website: chanchalkhan.com

Chanchal Khan is a Bangladeshi-Australian academic and a Rabindra Sangeet singer. He has performed Tagore songs at cultural events such as those organized by the Indira Gandhi Culture Centre in Dhaka, including commemorations of Rabindranath Tagore’s death anniversary.

Khan has released albums of Tagore’s works, notably Prangone Mor, produced by G-Series and marketed by Geetanjoli. His performances and recordings have been covered in Bangladeshi media, highlighting his contribution to Tagore music traditions. In addition to his artistic career, Khan is also released three documentaries, titled "Bangladeshey Rabindranath" (2011), "Timeless Gitanjali – Song Offerings" (2014), and "Chhinnapatra – Letters from the banks of River Padma".

Chanchal is a founder of Rabindra Sangeet Sammilan Parishad, and is also a member of the executive committee of Rabindra Sangeet Shilpi Sangstha.

== Discography ==
=== Albums ===
- Porobashi (1995)
- Prangone Mor
- Maharaj
- Khushi Thako
- Amar E Poth
- Shokol Rosher Dhara
- O Bhai Kanai

=== Duet Abums ===
- Sakol Raser Dhara (with Papia Sarwar)
- Jugol Golay Gatha (with Lily Islam)

=== Single ===
- Jete Dao Jete Dao Gelo Jara
