= Bulbul Academy of Fine Arts =

Coordinates: 23.7498°N 90.4236°E

- বুলবুল ললিতকলা একাডেমি
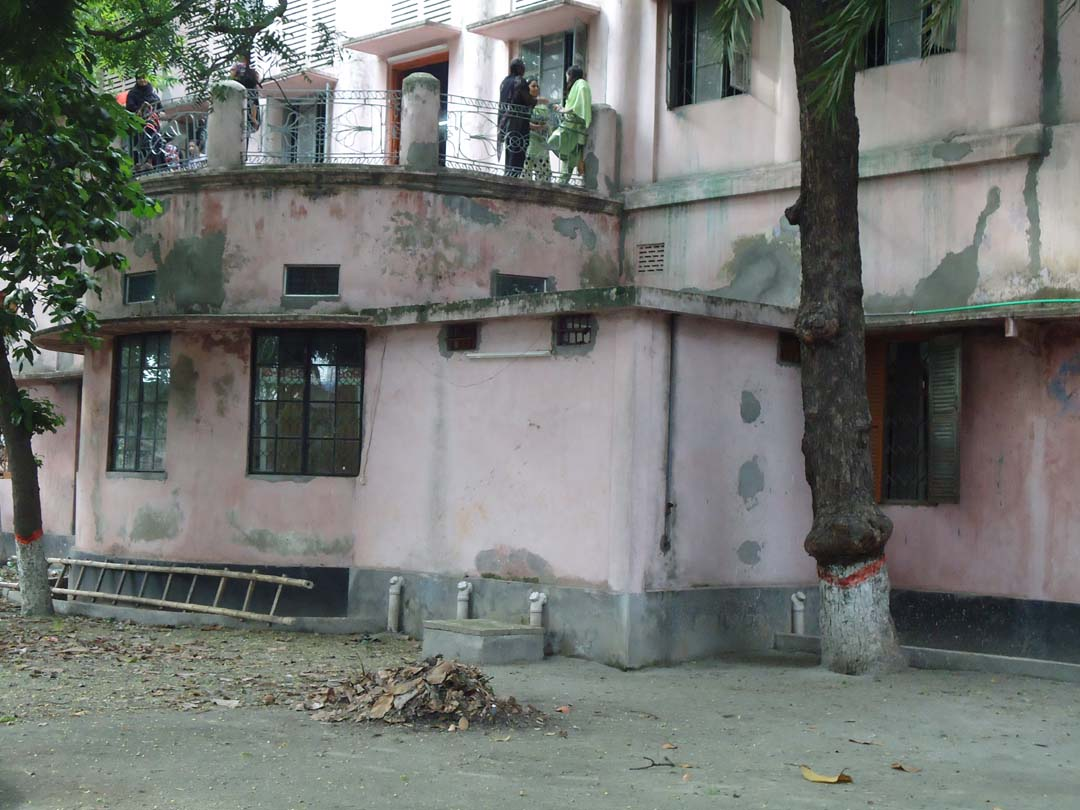

Location
- 7 Waisghat; Dhaka, 1100; Bangladesh

Information
- Type: Art school
- Established: 1955
- Founder: Begum Afroza BulBul
- Communities served: Begum Shamsuj Jahan Noor (President)
- Alumni: BAFA Alumni Association
- Website: bafa.org.bd

Bulbul Academy of Fine Arts (BAFA) is an institution of fine arts established in Dhaka on 17 May 1955, founded by Begum Afroza Bulbul, wife of Bulbul Chowdhury, under the financial support of the government.

== Roles ==
Students have to be present in their classes. Students with less than 70% attendance will not be able to sit for the two examinations. While attending any course at the academy students must take permission to attend radio, TV or any other programs from the academy authority.
