= Hok Kolorob =

2006 studio album by Arnob

Hok Kolorob (হোক কলরব)

Studio album by Arnob
- Released: January 1, 2006
- Recorded: December 2005
- Studio: BMC Studio, Baridhara, Dhaka
- Genre: Indie; experimental; rock
- Length: 53:26
- Label: BMC
- Producer: Arnob

Arnob chronology
Chaina Bhabish (চাইনা ভাবিস) (2005)	Hok Kolorob (হোক কলরব) (2006)	Doob (ডুব) (2008)

Hok Kolorob (হোক কলরব) is the second studio album by Bangladeshi singer-songwriter Arnob, released by BMC on 1 January 2006. After the massive success from his debut album, Chaina Bhabish, he gained more popularity among the youth.

After his one year record contract with Ektaar expired, he signed a contract with Bengal Music Company (BMC) and started the recording of this album in the fall of 2005. The album has sold over 150,000 copies and is considered to be one of the best-selling albums of all time.

== Writing and recording ==
In 1995, when Arnob, was a student of Art College in Santiniketan, he shared room with Taufiqe Riaz in the hostel. Taufiqe used to write songs, which he gave to Arnob every morning before going to class. Throughout the 1990s, Taufiqe wrote many songs which were tuned by Arnob, some songs were also co-written by him [Arnob]. The first track of side two, "Shomoy Kate (Time Goes On)", features a poem written by Arnob. Though there were many songs in his debut album written by his then wife Sahana Bajpaie, this album features only one song written by her, "Tomar Jonno (For You)". The song "Tui Ki Janishna (Don't You Know)", has two versions. One which features Sahana's vocals and the other features Junaina, Wadid, Milita and Prescila. Arnob's experimentation with his songs changed in this album, as this has much more art rock sound than the debut album. Arnob played esraj on "Tomar Jonno (For You)" and Jubair played flute on "Prokrito Jol (Natural Water)". The title of the album, "Hok Kolorob" was used as a slogan in the Jadavpur University students movement in 2014. The Daily Star said that:

His music had depth, the arrangements were uncommon, and his lyrics were poetic and reflective; yet, it did not attain booming popularity. The reason, some said, was that it was not music that everyone could easily relate to or hum along. His second album, "Hok Kolorob" made up for that, and some.

== Track listing ==
Most of the songs written by Taufiqe Riaz, expect where noted.

Side one
No.	Title	Lyrics	Length
1.	"Bakshe Bakshe" (Boxes)	Milita/Arnob	3:14
2.	"Tomar Jonno" (For You)	Sahana	4:02
3.	"Hok Kolorob" (Let there be Clamour)	Rajib Ashraf	3:23
4.	"Tui Ki Janish Na" (Don't You Know)	Taufiqe	5:19
5.	"Bhalobasha Tarpor" (After Love)	Taufiqe	4:33
6.	"Tor Jonno" (For You)	Taufiqe	4:02

Side two
No.	Title	Lyrics	Length
1.	"Shomoy Kate" (Time Goes On)	Taufiqe/Arnob	4:31
2.	"Chalak Tumi" (Clever You Are)	Arnob	4:18
3.	"Muhurto" (Moments)	Taufiqe/Arnob	4:01
4.	"Prokrito Jol" (Natural Water)	Rajib Ashraf	5:25
5.	"Shobdo" (Words)	Taufiqe/Arnob	4:03
6.	"Tui Ki Janishna (Reprise)" (Don't You Know (Reprise))	Taufiqe	6:03

== Personnel ==
- Arnob - lead vocals, acoustic guitars, esraj on "Tomar Jonno"

Additional Personnel

- Sahana Bajpaie - Backing vocals on "Tomar Jonno"
- Tahmid - Backing vocals on track "Tor Jonno"
- Junaina, Wadid, Milita and Prescila - Backing vocals on "Tui Ki Janishna 1"
- Jubair - Flute on "Prokrito Jol"

Production

- Recorded at - BMC Studio
- Album mixed by - Masudul Hassan
- Sound engineering and mixing by - Arnob
- Sleeve designed by - Arnob
