= Doob (album) =

2008 studio album by Arnob

Doob (ডুব)

Studio album by Arnob
- Released: April 3, 2008
- Recorded: October 2007 – March 2008
- Studio: BMC Studio, Baridhara, Dhaka
- Genre: Indie; experimental; rock
- Length: 1:00:33
- Label: BMC
- Producer: Arnob

Arnob chronology
Hok Kolorob (হোক কলরব) (2006)	Doob (ডুব) (2008)	Arnob & Friends Live (2009)

Doob (ডুব) is the third studio album by Bangladeshi singer, songwriter Arnob, released by BMC on 3 April 2008 and was sponsored by Nokia.

The recording of this album started in October 2007 and ended in March 2008. Followed up by Hok Kolorob, which contained songs which were written in the 1990s, this album contained new songs completely. Though it didn't match the success of Chaina Bhabish and Hok Kolorob, this album also contained great hits like "Shopno Debe Doob (Dreams Will Dive)", "Adhkana (Half-Blind)", "Chai (I Want)" and "Rastai (On the Road)". It also featured "Noyon Tomare (Oh Eyes You)", a rabindra sangeet classic and the first one recorded by Arnob. The album has sold about 80,000 copies in Bangladesh.

== Writing and recording ==
Arnob's previous albums Chaina Bhabish and Hok Kolorob, mostly featured songs that were written in the 1990s, by his friend and longtime lyricist Taufiqe Riaz, when he was still a student in Art College, Santiniketan. But, all the songs on this album was completely new and was written and composed mostly by Sahana Bajpaie and Shayan Chowdhury Arnob.

This album was Arnob's last to be released from BMC as his record contract would expire the same year. Recording of this album started in October 2007 in the BMC Studio and ended in March 2008. The album was recorded in six months and was the longest recording session of Arnob's career. The album contained fourteen songs and featured many artists. The album was dedicated to Sahana Bajpaie (his ex-wife).

== Track listing ==
Side one
No.	Title	Lyrics	Length
1.	"Onek Dur" (Far Away)	Faruk	2:22
2.	"Shopno Debe Doob" (Dreams Will Dive)	Sahana	4:04
3.	"Adhkana" (Half-Blind)	Arnob/Sahana	3:54
4.	"Ghor Bahir" (Out of the House)	Sahana	4:43
5.	"Lukiye" (Hiding)	Fariha	2:45
6.	"Dhaka Raate" (Night of Dhaka)	Anisul Hoque	4:24
7.	"Akash Kalo" (The Sky is Black)	Sahana	4:11

Side two
No.	Title	Lyrics	Length
1.	"Dikbidik" (Directional)	Sahana	4:48
2.	"Tati" (Tailor)	Shatarupa Roy	3:25
3.	"Chai" (I Want)	Arnob	4:15
4.	"Ghum" (Slumber)	Rajib Ashraf	4:52
5.	"Rastai" (On the Street)	Arnob	4:38
6.	"Dhushor Megh" (Grey Sky)	Rajib Ashraf	4:01
7.	"Noyon Tomare" (Oh Eyes You)	Rabindranath Tagore	10:11

== Personnel ==
- Arnob – vocals, acoustic guitars

Additional personnel

- Srabonti – Backing vocals on "Shopno Debe

Doob"

- Saad – Guitar solo on "Shopno Debe Doob"
- Sahana Bajpaie – Backing vocals on "Adhkana"
- Maher "the Mak" Khan – Lead guitars on "Akash Kalo" and "Rastai"
- Andrew – Saxophone on "Chai"
- Zohad Reza Chowdhury – Backing vocals on "Rastai"
- Idris Rahman – Clarinet on "Noyon Tomare"

Production

- Recorded at – BMC Studio
- Album mixed by – Arnob
- Sound engineering and mixing by – Arnob
- Sleeve designed by – Arnob
