= Sheikh Monirul Alam Tipu =

- শেখ মনিরুল আলম টিপু
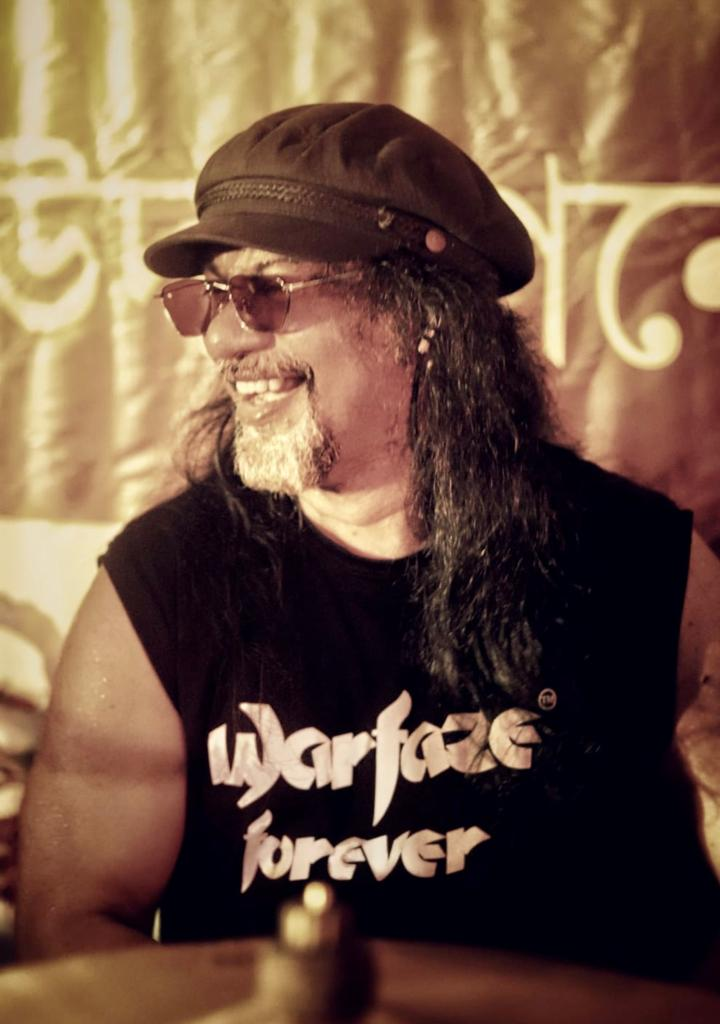
- Sheikh Monirul Alam Tipu in 2023
- Born: 15 July 1970 (age 55); Dhaka, Bangladesh
- Other name: Tipu
- Occupations: rhythm composer, drummer, percussions, lyricist, music producer
- Years active: 1986–present
- Musical career
- Genres: Heavy metal; hard rock
- Instrument: Drums
- Labels: G-Series; Sargam; Soundtek; Ektaar Music; Loyy Records

Sheikh Monirul Alam Tipu (born 15 July 1970) is a Bangladeshi musician, known as a rhythm composer, drummer, lyricist, and music producer. He is best known as the co-founder and Band Leader but he is widely considered as the Founder of Warfaze, a popular heavy metal and rock band from Bangladesh. Tipu has been with Warfaze for a year since its formation in 1986, providing drums play, percussion play, and rhythm composition for all eight of the band's music albums. He is also known for playing in the band “Pentagon” and “Winning” which garnered huge success. He served as the Vice President of Bangladesh Musical Bands' Association (BAMBA) until November 2020 and has since held the position of Vice President which he still holds currently. He is also one of the Executive Member of Bangladesh Lyricist Composer & Performers Society (BLCPS). It is the first and only Collective Management Organization (CMO) for music in Bangladesh. He is also a Business Entrepreneur who is running an Advertising Agency named Carnival in Bangladesh. He was also the Partner & Production Director of Ektaar Music from 2001–2005. Later, he received an invitation from the National Skill Development Authority (NSDA) which is a Bangladesh government agency under the Prime Minister's Office responsible for developing policies to build a skilled force for different sectors of labor. In 2020 he started a record label called Loy Records which was launched officially in December 2021 with the prime intention to promote and cultivate young talents of the country whilst encouraging them to find their own path through music so they can represent their country internationally. On 10 December 2021, he started his new journey with his own record label called "Loyy Records"

== Early life and education ==
Tipu's family background was rich in artistic talent; his father was a government official and his mother a housewife, while his elder brother played the Hawaiian guitar and his elder sister was a singer of Rabindra and Nazrul songs. His youngest sister was a classical dancer, and his second brother was a national gymnast and goalkeeper for the Victoria Sporting Club. Inspired by his second brother, Tipu trained as a goalkeeper in football and in gymnastics.

In 1976, Tipu began playing the tabla and formed a musical group with his cousins and neighbors, participating in the reality show 'Notunkuri' on BTV. He made his debut as a drummer on a program on Bangladesh Television with the Bishforon Musical Group and later joined the Pony Musical Group. After playing with the band 'Stars', he formed his own band called 'Scorcher', which lasted for two years. After completing his matriculation examination from Bangladesh Bank High School in 1985, he was admitted to Notre Dame College, Dhaka. Also played drums for two years in Azam Khan's band "Uchcharan".

Currently, Tipu has been married to Farzana Habib for 25 years and has a son Sheikh Addhaya Alam.

== Musical career ==
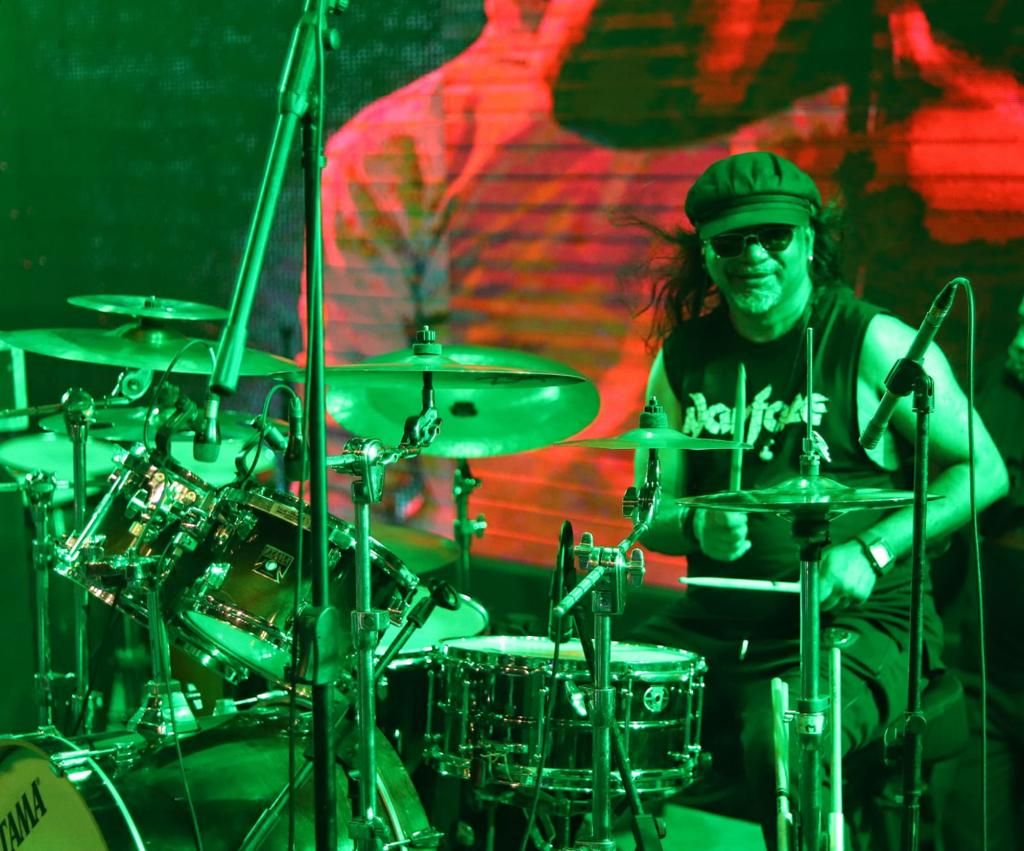
Sheikh Monirul Alam Tipu Performing

=== Warfaze (1986–present) ===
"We started Warfaze but Tipu is the one who held the band together" - Babna in 2008

Tipu, a skilled drummer, percussionist, and tabla player, joined Warfaze in the early months of 1986. Shortly after his arrival, founding members Mir and Helal left the band, prompting Kamal, the bass player, to take over the guitar position. Tipu and Kamal then invited Babna Karim as the new bass player, Reshad as the lead vocalist, and Mashuk as a guest in the second guitar position. In the late 1980s, Warfaze covered popular songs from bands such as Iron Maiden, Black Sabbath, Whitesnake, Deep Purple, and Scorpions. However, Reshad left the band in 1988 due to personal problems. Tipu and Kamal then invited Sunjoy as the new lead vocalist and Russell Ali as the keyboard player in 1990. From there, they gradually started performing live concerts while simultaneously working on their self-titled debut album, Warfaze, at Sargam Studio in Bijoynagar, Dhaka. The band released their debut album on June 21, 1991. Since then, Tipu has appeared on all of the band's studio albums, and he has been responsible for the rhythm composition, most of the song arrangements, and producing all of Warfaze's albums. Additionally, Tipu has been solely responsible for selecting all of the songs for every studio album, as well as handling managerial and album coordination duties.

=== Winning (1988–1998) ===
Tipu was a member of the band Winning for a decade. During his time with the band, he contributed to the creation of two highly successful studio albums, "Winning" and "Ochena Shohor," and performed numerous concerts both domestically and internationally.

=== Pentagon (1999-2009 & 2019 to present) ===
From 1999 to 2009, Tipu was a percussionist for the band Pentagon. During his tenure with the group, he performed at numerous concerts and played a significant role in the creation of two studio albums, "Shei Ami" and "8 'O'Clock." After a busy period with Warfaze, Tipu took a ten-year hiatus before returning to work with Pentagon in 2019. He remains an active member of the band to this day.

== Drumming style ==
Tipu's musical journey began with tabla, which made it easy for him to transition to playing drums. He enjoys playing the drums in rock, hard rock, heavy metal, and groovy styles, which are a blend of his experience playing tabla and other percussion instruments. Tipu prioritizes his music, composing his rhythm patterns in a way that complements the melody and riff of each song. This can be observed in various songs, such as the beautiful groove created by the drums, guitar, bass, and melody in "Pathchala." His soft rock style can be heard in "Purnota," where the ride cymbals create a beautiful melody that blends with the guitar solo, bass, and drums. This style is also present in other songs, including "Rupkotha," "Jotodurey," "Protikkha," and "Bicchinnoabeg." In addition to these, Tipu's hard rock, heavy metal, and progressive playing can be heard in songs like "Kew Nei Eka," "Mukti Chai," "Brishti," "Hotosha," "Oshamajik," "Dhushor Manchitro," and "Arr Kotokal." In each song, Tipu's beautiful melody rhythm composition pattern, along with his single and double bass work, blends seamlessly with the melody of the song and all the instruments to create a unique groove that elevates the music to a whole new level.

== Videography ==
In 2003, for the first time, Tipu and some of his friends made the music video for the song “Kohu Shure” which was part of Habib's second album “Maya”. The continuous success of the music video led Tipu, with the help of his friend, to make four music videos for the artist Mehereen titled “Mayabihi Raat” “Rim Jhim” “Sharabela” and “Ei ki Aloy Rangale”. Afterward, Tipu individually directed 3 music videos for the artist Mila titled “Mela” “CChera Paal” and “Shei Ami”. He also made a good number of corporate videos through his advertising and event managing agency, Carnival, which garnered more recognition for his skills in directing.

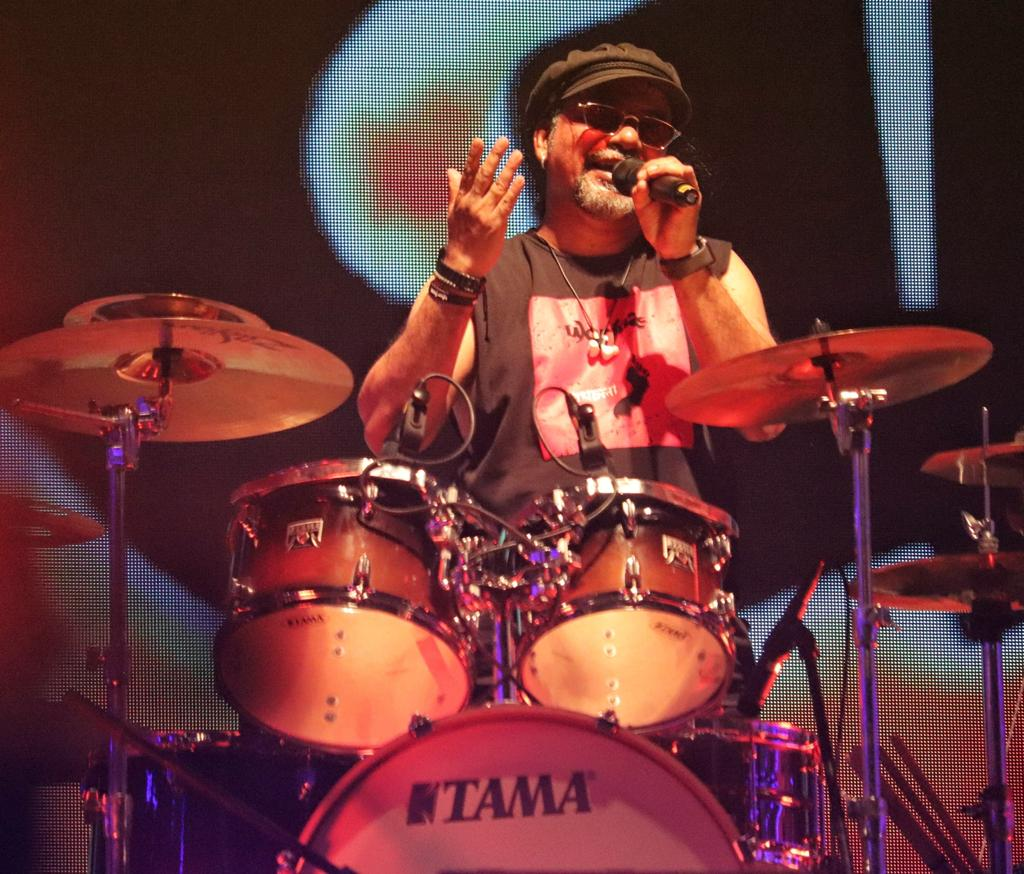

== Personal life ==
Tipu has been married to Farzana Habib for 25 years and has a son Sheikh Addhaya Alam.

=== Social advocacy ===
Tipu is the owner of Carnival, a company that initially started as an advertising agency and event management organization. However, Carnival has expanded its scope to include various social advocacy work and charitable initiatives. During the Sidr crisis, Tipu, both as an organizer for Carnival and a band member of Warfaze, participated in a fund-raising concert for the victims of the disaster, including those affected by floods, acid attacks, and various illnesses such as kidney and heart disease. In 2011, he also took part in a charity concert organized by the Japanese Embassy in Bangladesh to aid Japan and its tsunami victims. Additionally, Tipu has been involved in various concerts aimed at supporting the Bangladesh government's efforts against drugs, terrorism, and natural disasters. Currently, Tipu, along with Warfaze, is an advocate for child rights in UNICEF Bangladesh. Moreover, from 2009 to 2012, Tipu as a representative of both a Warfaze band member and BAMBA's general secretary, was an integral part of a campaign for violence against women for UNFPA.

== Discography ==
=== Warfaze ===
- Warfaze (21 June 1991)
- অবাক ভালোবাসা (Obak Bhalobasha) (September, 1994)
- জীবনধারা (JIbondhara) (February, 1996)
- অসামাজিক (Oshamajik) (1 April 1998)
- আলো (Aalo) (December, 2000)
- মহারাজ (Moharaj) (15 June 2003)
- পথচলা (Pothchola) (14 April 2009)
- সত্য (Shotto) (21 October 2012)

=== Winning ===
- Winning (16 June 1991)
- Ochena Shohhor (1994)

PENTAGON

- Shei Ami (30 September 2002)
- 8 o’clock (22 March 2009)

Other Musical Works

- Kotoje Khujecchi Tomaye – Niloy Dash (1988)
- Different Touch (1989)
- Blues- (1990)
- Chitkar- Ramblers- November (1991)
- Anari – Mehreen (2000)
- Gaan Neben Gaan – Shahed (30 September 2002)
- Amar ekta nodi chilo - Pothik Nabi (2002)
- Ekush Shatoke Renaissance’ - Renaissance (2004)
