= Chaina Bhabish =

2005 studio album by Arnob

Chaina Bhabish (চাইনা ভাবিস)

Studio album by Arnob
- Released: 1 June 2005
- Recorded: March–May 2005
- Studio: Ektaar Music Studio, Gulshan, Dhaka
- Genre: Indie; experimental; rock; pop
- Length: 58:49
- Label: Ektaar
- Producer: Arnob

Arnob chronology
Chaina Bhabish (চাইনা ভাবিস) (2005)	Hok Kolorob (হোক কলরব) (2006)

Chaina Bhabish (Bengali: চাইনা ভাবিস) is the debut studio album by Bangladeshi singer-songwriter Arnob, released on 1 June 2005 by Ektaar Music. The album was mixed, mastered and engineered by Arnob himself. It featured the hit song "She Je Boshe Ache". The album artwork was also drawn by Arnob. Since the release of the album Arnob gained huge popularity among the youth of Bangladesh.

After leaving his band Bangla, Arnob signed a contract with Ektaar Music and started recording in March, which ended in May 2005. Only two songs in this album were written by Arnob, "She Je Boshe Ache" and "Chuya Chuyi". This album was both well received by people and have sold over 250,000 copies in Bangladesh and is considered to be one of the best-selling albums of the decade.

== Track listing ==
Most of the songs were written by Sahana Bajpaie, except where noted.

Side one
No.	Title	Lyrics	Length
1.	"Amar Hariye Jawa" (Losing Myself)	Taufiqe	5:25
2.	"Chilte Rode" (Sunny Day)	Saron	5:52
3.	"Dhulo" (Dust)	Taufiqe	3:43
4.	"Chaina Bhabish" (Don't Want You to Worry)	Sahana	4:05
5.	"She Je Boshe Ache" (She is Sitting)	Arnob	3:38
6.	"Brishti Raate" (In the Rainy Night)	Sahana	4:24

Side two
No.	Title	Lyrics	Length
1.	"Konodin" (Someday)	Saron	4:46
2.	"Shopnorogi" (Dreamer)	Sahana	3:41
3.	"Bibek Bebagi" (Conscience Bigotry)	Saron	6:23
4.	"Hariye Giyechi" (I am Lost)	Sahana	4:31
5.	"Jete Hobe" (Gotta Go)	Sahana	6:08
6.	"Ekdin" (One Day)	Sahana	4:30
7.	"Chuya Chuyi" (Touches)	Arnob	1:43

== Personnel ==
- Arnob - lead vocals, acoustic guitars

Additional personnel

- Sahana Bajpaie - backing vocals

Production

- Recorded at - Ektaar Music Studio
- Sound engineering and mixing by - Arnob
- Cover artwork by - Arnob
