= Shayan Chowdhury Arnob =

Bangladeshi singer-songwriter, musician and record producer

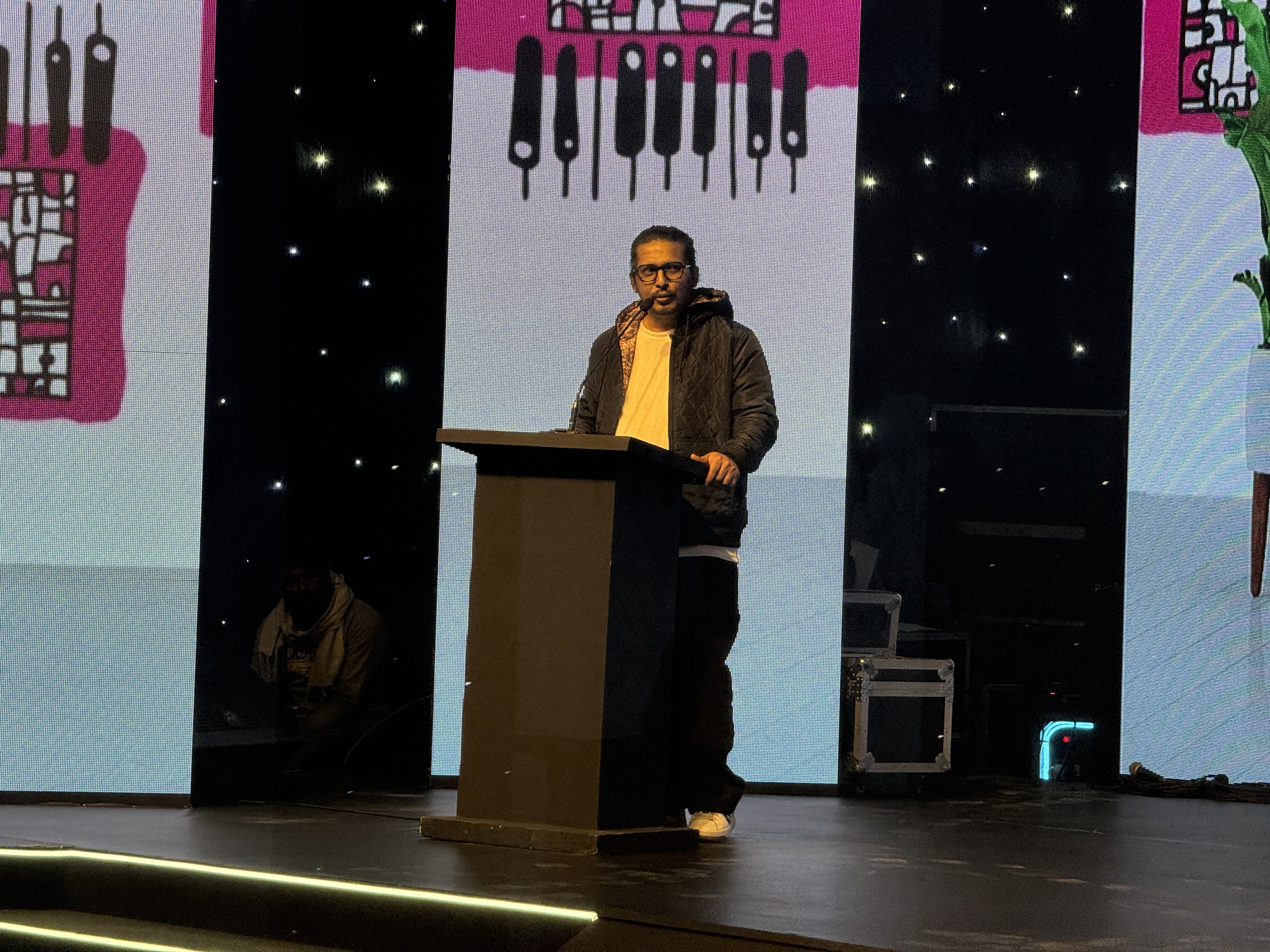
- Arnob in 2026
- Born: 27 January 1978 (age 48); Dhaka, Bangladesh
- Education: Visva-Bharati University; University of Calcutta
- Occupations: Musician; record producer; artist
- Years active: 2002–present
- Spouses: Sahana Bajpaie (m. 2000; div. 2008); Sunidhi Nayak (m. 2020)
- Relatives: Tapan Chowdhury (uncle); Rafiath Rashid Mithila (cousin)
- Musical career
- Genres: Indie; folk; rock; Rabindra Sangeet
- Instruments: Vocals; guitars; piano; tabla; esraj; drums
- Labels: Adhkana; BMC
- Member of: Bangla

Shayan Chowdhury Arnob (born 27 January 1978) is a Bangladeshi singer-songwriter, musician, painter, filmmaker, animator and producer. Arnob was the founding member of the indie folk band Bangla which later went hiatus for internal reasons. Arnob continued performing with some of the band members as Arnob and Friends.

Arnob gained nationwide recognition as a solo artist for his title track She Je Boshe Ache for the 2004 TV drama Offbeat. The song also appeared in his first solo album Chaina Bhabish, released in 2005. This album was followed by his two renowned solo albums Hok Kolorob and Doob, cementing his position as a prominent musician in Bangladesh. In 2009, Arnob released his first live album Arnob & Friends Live, which featured songs from his international tour in October 2008. As of 2022, Arnob released seven solo albums, and composed film scores for several notable Bengali language films, which include Monpura, Jaago, Aynabaji and Under Construction.

In 2022, Arnob produced the inaugural season of Coke Studio Bangla, the Bangladeshi incarnation of the Coke Studio franchise.

== Life and career ==
=== Early years ===
Arnob was born in Dhaka on 27 January 1978, to the painter couple Swapan Chowdhury and Suraiya Chowdhury. His father, Swapan Chowdhury, originally Hindu, converted to Islam following his marriage to Arnob's Muslim mother. Swapan was a member of the traveling music band that participated in the Bangladesh Liberation War of 1971 and was featured in the documentary Muktir Gaan. He is a cousin to Bangladeshi actress, model, and singer Rafiath Rashid Mithila.

Arnob started schooling at Willes Little Flower School in Dhaka. However, in 1985, at the insistence of his mother, Arnob was admitted to Patha Bhavana, a school affiliated with Vishva Bharati at Santiniketan, West Bengal, India. While at Patha Bhavana, he took lessons in Esraj and taught himself to play keyboard and guitar. He was also exposed to a wide range of musical styles, ranging from western music to the local baul traditions, and started composing music with his friends at this time. However, in a 2014 interview to a Bangladeshi magazine, he confessed:

I never thought I would take music as a profession! Even at school, I was the worst in music.

=== 1990s ===
==== 1995–1999: Visva Bharati University and the formation of Bangla ====
After completing high school education, Arnob enrolled at Visva Bharati University in 1995 to study at the Fine Arts Academy (Kala Bhavana). In 1998, when he was a fourth-year student, he formed an indie folk fusion band named Bangla. His family friend Anusheh Anadil learned about his project while visiting Shantiniketan and joined the band as a vocalist. Anusheh brought in bassist Buno, who had prior experience in folk fusion. With the new lineup, the band had their first performance at the Kolkata Book Fair in January 1999.

=== 2000s ===
==== 2000–2007: Relocation to Dhaka, debut album of Bangla and going solo ====
Arnob returned to Dhaka in 1999. The same year, instrumentalists Kartik, Shantunu and Nazrul joined Bangla. The band had their first formal concert at the Sheraton Hotel in Dhaka in October 1999.

His very first known work in TV media was the theme song for the drama (natok) called "Bondhon"

In 2002, Bangla took part in "the Benson and Hedges Star Search" competition, and Arnob received the Award for Best Instrumentalist for playing esraj. The same year, Bangla released its debut album, Kingkortobbobimurho.

In 2004, his first solo song, 'She Je Boshe Ache', was released as the title track of the teleplay-off Beat, which started at 36:55 of the teleplay. In the fall of 2004, Arnob signed a contract with Ektaar for one year. He started the recording of his debut album, Chaina Bhabish, in March 2005 in the EML studio in Gulshan, Dhaka. It ended in May, and the album was released on June 1, 2005. Two songs in the album were written by Arnob, "She Je Boshe Ache" and "Chuya Chuyi".

Arnob began 2006 by signing with a new label, Bengal Music Company. His next album, Hok Kolorob, was recorded in 2005 in a BMC studio and mostly contained songs by Taufiqe Riaz. One track on this album, "Tomar Jonno" was written by Sahana Bajpaie and composed by Arnob. The self-titled song "Hok Kolorob", was written by Rajib Ashraf. It was called by many a protest song. It was used as a slogan in the 2014 Jadavpur University Students movement. About that, he said to the Indian Express: "My politics is a gut reaction, guided by practicality rather than ideology. I don’t consider myself to be a political person; I couldn’t say if I am right-wing or left-wing. Things have to make sense for me to throw my weight behind it". In this album, Arnob has co-written four songs alongside Taufiqe, Sahana and Milita and only one full song, "Chalak Tumi". The same year, Arnob won two Channel i Music Awards: "Best Album Artwork" award for the artwork of Hok Kolorob and the "Best Rock Album" award for his participation in Prayer Hall's album Bujhcho. He also composed many songs for Sahana's debut album, Notun Kore Pabo Bole, which was released in 2007.

==== 2008–2009: Doob and world tour ====
Arnob's early April 2008 album, Doob contained mostly new songs and more electrically amplified rock songs than his previous albums. The album featured many contemporary artists like Sahana Bajpaie, Zohad Reza Chowdhury (Nemesis), Mak, Idris Rahman, Saad, and Andrew Morris. This album also marks his first to feature a rabindra sangeet, "Noyon Tomare". "Shopno Debe Doob", a song written by Sahana was included in the Poems Collection of Shonkho Ghosh. Many critics said that "it didn't match the success and popularity of his previous albums".

In mid-2008, Arnob, backed up by Nazia Ahmed (vocals), Resalat Dhrubo (bass guitars), Jibon (drums), and Nazrul (dhol), took part in a world tour, organized by Drishtipat and sponsored by HSBC. The tour only contained five concerts in Washington, New York City, Texas, Toronto, and London. The concert was arranged to raise money for Drishtipat's project "Child Domestic Workers Education" and some other development projects in Bangladesh. In November 2009, Arnob released a live album named Arnob & Friends Live: Songs from the World Tour '08 from BMC. In 2009, he started his own record label, Adhkana Records. .

=== 2010s ===
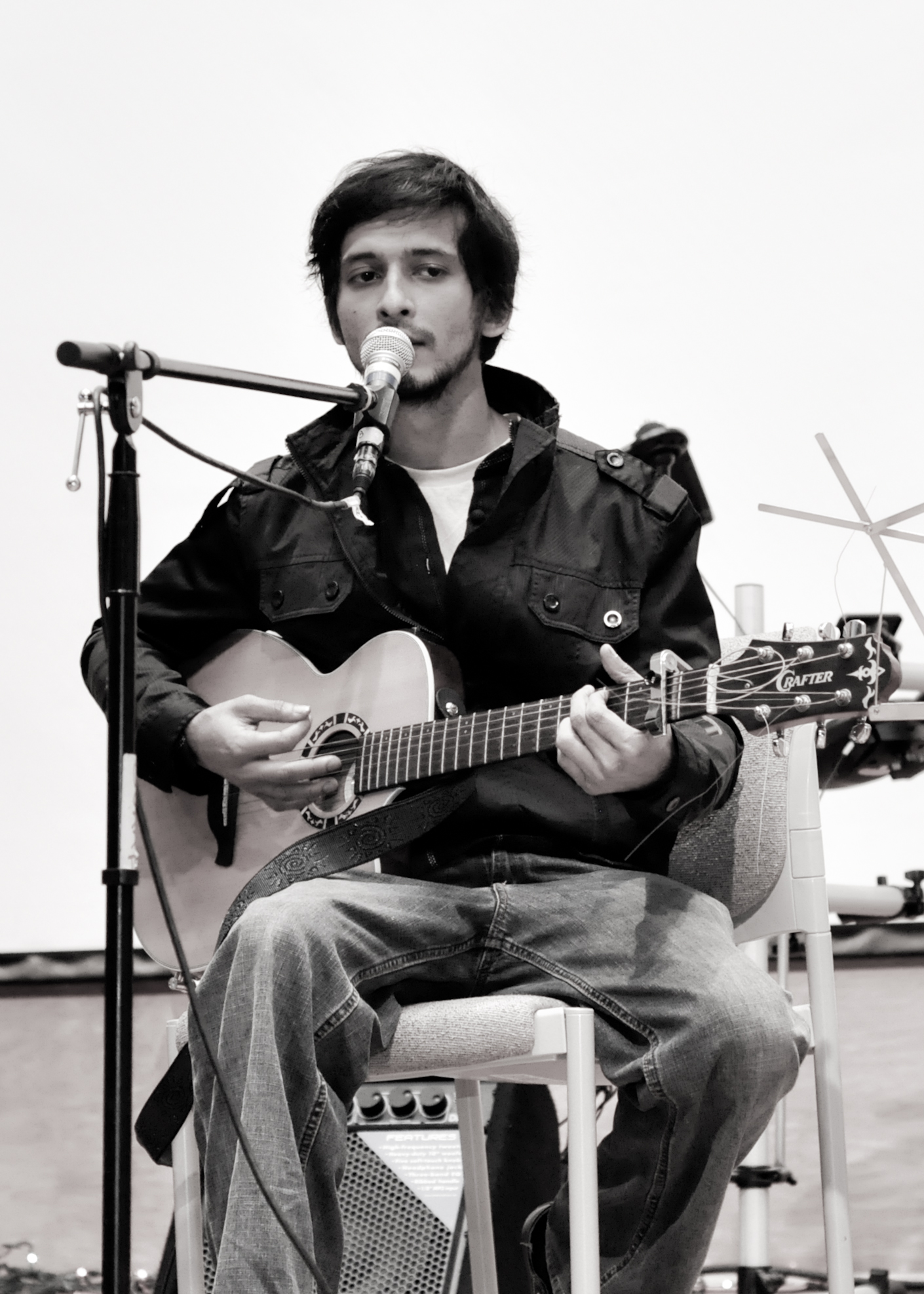
Arnob pictured in 2012, while performing in Dallas, Texas

==== 2010–present: Rod Boleche Hobe to Ondho Shohor ====
Arnob's fourth studio album, Rod Boleche Hobe, was released in October 2010. Recorded and released from his own label, Adhkhana Studio, the CD booklet of this album featured artwork and poems by Arnob.

Arnob recorded a whole rabindra sangeet album in the popular music scene, Adheko Ghume. It was released by BMC in June 2012 and was recorded in Adhkhana studio. It was a tribute to Rabindranath Tagore and a homage to his life at Santiniketan.

In May 2015, Arnob's sixth studio album Khub Doob came out from Adhkhana Studio.

Arnob's first documentary film, Introspection, was on his father Swapan Chowdhury for one of his exhibitions on his water color series hosted by Bengal foundation.

In 2017, Arnob released his seventh solo album Ondho Shohor on the smartphone-based music streaming service Yonder Music. The album featured 17 eclectic tracks that included original tracks, previously released movie soundtracks and Tagore song renditions, as well as three English language songs.

Bangladeshi streaming service Chorki released a documentary biographical film on Arnob's musical career, titled Adhkhana Bhalo Chele, Adha Mostaan, in 2021.

In 2022, Arnob collaborated with a number of prominent and emerging Bangladeshi artists to produce the inaugural season of Coke Studio Bangla.

== Personal life ==
While attending Patha Bhavana at Santiniketan, Arnob met Sahana Bajpaie. The couple were married in 2000. Between 2005 and 2008, Sahana contributed lyrics to Arnob's songs and sang backup vocal in some of them, while Arnob directed music for Sahana's debut album, Notun Kore Pabo Bole. The couple were divorced in the fall of 2008. Arnob started dating Indian singer Sunidhi Nayak in 2019, and married her in October 2020.

On religion, Arnob told the Indian Express that "For people of our generation, religion was never a big deal....Bangladesh is a republic with an Islamic majority. Why would you insist on non-Islamic people adhering to the same religious injunctions? Why not leave it to choice?". He is an amateur football player and holds a green belt in Karate.

== Discography ==
- Chaina Bhabish (2005)
- Hok Kolorob (2006)
- Doob (2008)
- Arnob & Friends Live (2009)
- Rod Boleche Hobe (2010)
- Adheko Ghume (2012)
- Khub Doob (2015)
- Ondho Shohor (2017)
- Arnob & Friends 2 (2023)
- Bhallagena (2025)

== See also ==
- Notable people associated with Santiniketan
