= Warfaze =

Bangladeshi heavy metal band

Warfaze ওয়ারফেজ
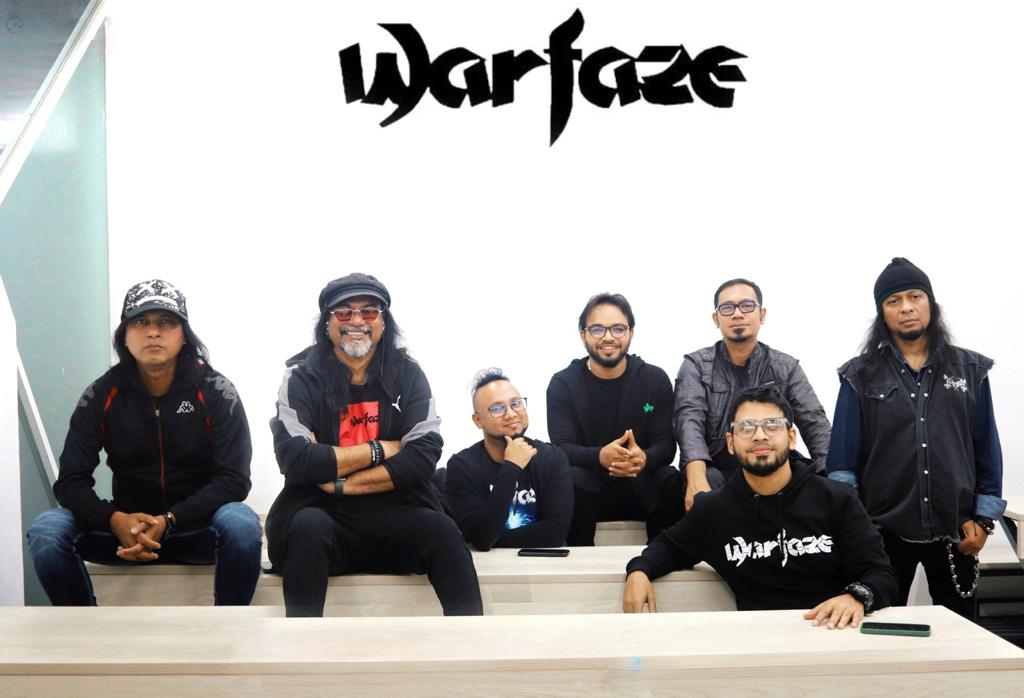
- Warfaze 2023

Background information
- Origin: Dhaka, Bangladesh
- Genres: Hard rock, heavy metal
- Years active: 1984–present
- Labels: G-Series; Ektaar; Soundtek; Sargam
- Award: Ekushey Padak (2026)
- Members: Sheikh Monirul Alam Tipu; Ibrahim Ahmed Kamal; Shams Mansoor Ghani; Naim Haque Roger; Palash Noor; Samir Hafiz; Soumen Das
- Past members: Sunjoy; Babna Karim; Balam; Mizan Rahman; Oni Hasan; Fuad Ibne Rabbi; Sazzad Arefeen; Russell Ali; Romel Ali; Saef Al Nazi (Cezanne); Iqbal Asif Jewel; Saidus Salehin Khaled Sumon
- Website: www.warfaze.rocks

Warfaze is a Bangladeshi heavy metal band formed on 6 June 1984 in Dhaka by Ibrahim Ahmed Kamal, Meer, Helal, Naimul, and Bapi. They are one of the earliest heavy metal bands in Bangladesh. The band had numerous line-up changes since 1984 and since its inception, the band has released seven studio albums, one compilation album, and several singles. They have experimented with numerous sub-genres of rock and heavy metal over the years.

In 2026, the band was awarded with the Ekushey Padak, for special contribution to Rock Music.

== History ==
=== 1984–Now ===
The first lineup of Warfaze on 6 June 1984 consisted of Bapi on vocals, Meer and Naimul on guitars, Kamal on bass, and Helal on drums. This initial line-up underwent the first of many changes with Helal, Meer, and Bapi having to leave the band for personal reasons. By that time Kamal met Tipu and early 1986 Tipu joined Warfaze as the drummer and co-founder but everyone consider him as founder. The band was far from breaking through to the mainstream music scene in Bangladesh and heavy metal music was not very popular in the country back then.

In 1986, Kamal took up lead guitar duties and they took in Babna Karim as the bassist, and Reshad as the vocalist. This second lineup had to be discontinued when Naimul moved to the US. At that time, there were three other Dhaka-based metal bands: Rockstrata, In Dhaka, and Aces. Mashuk Rahman from In Dhaka and Fuad from Aces volunteered to help Warfaze as guest members (guitarist). The band opened a keyboard position and then Russell Ali joined. In 1988, Reshad had left the band for some personal reason and his place was filled by Sunjoy. Kamal had made arrangements for further education in the US by 1991.

At the time, Warfaze was mostly a cover band, covering bands such as Deep Purple, Whitesnake, Dokken, Iron Maiden or Guns N' Roses. However, inspired by Maqsud, former vocalist of Feedback, the band performed their own Bangla songs at a concert arranged by BAMBA at the University of Dhaka on 26 April 1992. The band at first decided to make a mixed album, but as it turned out Warfaze had enough songs to be able to release a solo album. The band went on to release their self-titled album, Warfaze, on 21 June 1991. The album featured songs like "Boshe Achi Eka" and "Ekti Chele". At the time, Bangladeshi music listeners were still new to metal and any lyrics other than those inspired by romanticism or patriotism were rare. It took several months for the album to gain popularity but it later succeeded.

The album was followed up by a concert on 7 January 1992 at RAOWA Club. The next album, Obak Bhalobasha, was released by Sargam in 1994. Warfaze's sound was developed in this album, featuring songs with heavier tones.

"Obak Bhalobasha," the title track from the album was a big hit. This song was composed with soft melodic structures in a progressive way and is one of the earliest progressive rock songs in the history of Bangladesh. It was sung by Babna Karim (Warfaze's bassist), instead of their lead singer, Sunjoy. "Obak Bhalobasha" is one of the fewest hit songs recorded by the band which weren't sung by their lead singers. It is also one of the longest tracks recorded by Warfaze, spanning 8 minutes and 37 seconds. The song later got re-released on season 3 episode 3 of Coke Studio Bangla as part of Warfaze's Ruby Jubilee in 2024.

After completing the album, Russel Ali left the band to start a music career in the United States later that year. Its Bangladesh's number 1 most popular band.

=== 1996–1998 ===
The band released the album Jibondhara in December 1996, with Sunjoy on vocals, Kamal on guitars, Babna on bass and vocals, Tipu on drums and guest keyboardist, Fuad played together on the same album. Ruchi joined as a guest backup vocalist. During the same period, Iqbal Asif Jewel joined as a guitarist and second vocalist from another rock band, Legend. Babna had to leave for his career and study in the US and therefore he was replaced by Saidus Sumon who played for the Oshamajik album on 1 April 1998. After completing Oshamajik, Sunjoy left to pursue his career in 1999. Around the same time, Sumon left the band to pursue a career both as a solo artist, and with his band Aurthohin.

Then Biju joined as a bassist, replacing Sumon. Iqbal Asif Jewel left the band to join Miles as well as Fuad Ibne Rabbi, who left for his career.

=== 1999–2008 ===
The band underwent many changes in line-up over the next eight years. Their guitarist Balam, replaced Iqbal Asif Jewel. From 1999, Mizan replaced Sunjoy on vocals, Shams on keyboard and Biju on bass. Tipu and Kamal held their previous positions. This line-up released the album Alo আলো (Light) in 2000.

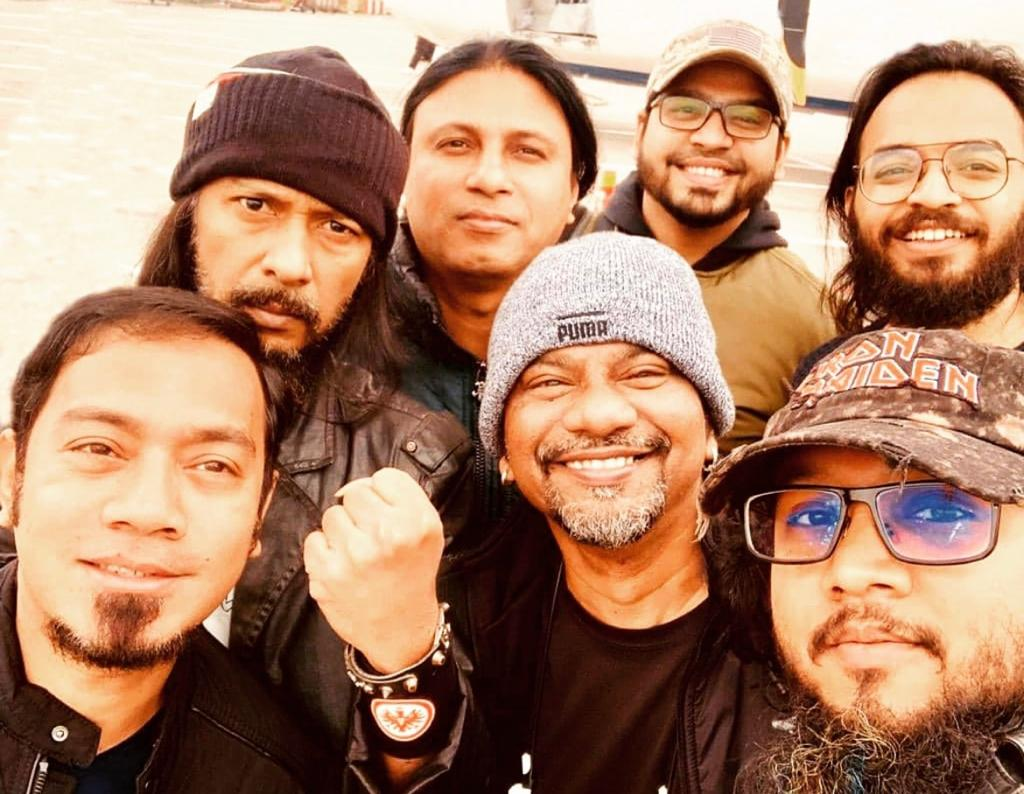
Warfaze Current Lineup 2023

However, 2002 marked changes in the line-up once again with Mizan leaving the band for personal reasons and Kamal leaving the band for his personal and family issues. Kamal later joined Sumon's band Aurthohin in 2006. With Mizan's departure from the band, Balam took up vocal & guitar duties. Sazzad was recruited from Metal Maze as the lead guitarist replacing Kamal. Biju left the band to pursue higher education in Canada. All the while, throughout all these drastic changes, Tipu solely held the band together. Cézanne was then recruited as the bassist of the emerging progressive metal band Artcell. Later on, Balam departed to pursue a solo career as a commercial pop artist. Kamal rejoined the band in 2007. The band recruited Oni Hasan from the band Vibe right after. This resulted in a major change in their tone and sound, with neoclassical metal influences especially in live performances.

=== 2009-2012 ===
Following the release of a compilation album titled Poth Chola (sponsored by Nokia) which includes re-recorded versions of their songs along with a couple of new singles titled "Tomake" and "Omanush," the band began touring extensively. With a new and stable lineup since 2007 that had stayed together for almost more than 5 years then, the band went on to celebrate their silver jubilee at a gala concert, which featured performances from both past and present members of Warfaze at the Winter Garden, Hotel Sheraton, Dhaka. Tipu announced that a live concert recording album was planned, along with a new studio album which later came out in 2012 titled Shotto.

The band continued to experiment with their sound with the release of a fusion album entitled Somorpon, merging elements of heavy metal with traditional Bangladeshi folk music as a tribute to Hason Raja, Lalon, and Baul Shah Abdul Karim working with Sumon's band Aurthohin and solo artist Habib Wahid. Warfaze tributed the songs of Lalon, Aurthohin tributed the songs of Hason Raja and Habib Wahid tributed the songs of Baul Shah Abdul Karim.

=== 2013-present ===
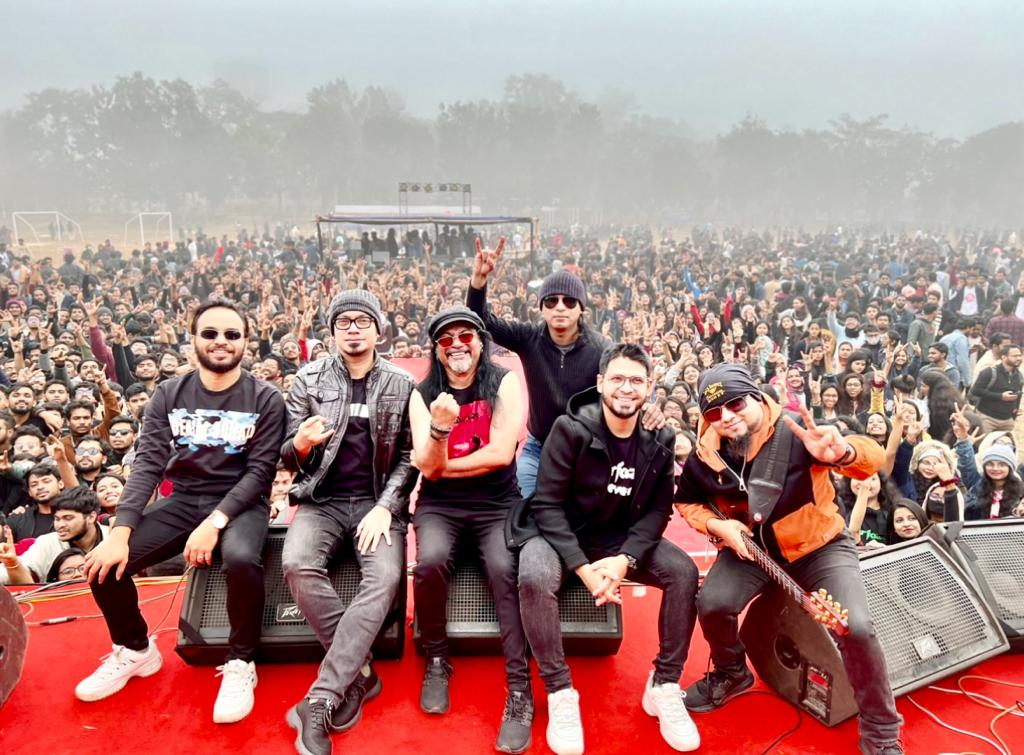
Warfaze in 2023

Shotto was released on 21 October 2012 featuring the same line-up as in Poth Chola. The album was a huge commercial success with hit tracks like "Purnota" and "Rupkotha." The album also included an unreleased single from the early 2000s called "Protikkha."

At midnight on 13 February 2013, Warfaze performed at the Projonmo Chattar to show their support for the Shahbag protest in Dhaka, Bangladesh, in demand of capital punishment for Abdul Quader Mollah and all the other accused war criminals of the 1971 Liberation War of Bangladesh. It also marked the return of Kamal with his solos.

Currently, they are working on their upcoming compilation album 'Pothchola-2' which will include re-recorded versions of their songs like 'Alo' and 'Hariye Tomake.'

On 23 October 2026, Oni Hasan reunited with the band for a performance at Rock N Rhythm 5.0.

== Musical style and influences ==
The band has been consistently cited as an inspiration by most active heavy metal artists today in Bangladesh as one of the first bands to introduce metal to the people in their country. The band used to play cover versions of bands like Iron Maiden, Deep Purple, Whitesnake, Scorpions, Guns N' Roses and Dokken, etc. in their early years. Throughout their career, the band has experimented with multiple genres of rock and metal music

== Discography ==
Studio albums

- Warfaze (Sargam, 1991)
- Obak Bhalobasha (Wondrous Love) (Sargam, 1994)
- Jibondhara (Lifestyle) (Soundtek, 1996)
- অসামাজিক (Antisocial) (G-Series, 1998)
- আলো (Light) (Soundtek, 2000)
- মহারাজ (Your Majesty) (Ektaar Music, 2003)
- পথচলা (Walking Paths) (G-Series, 2009)
- সত্য (Truth) (Deadline Music Records, 2012)

Compilation albums

- Best Collection – 4 in 1(1999)

Mixed albums

- Dhun – 6 Band Mixed Album (ধুন) (1997)
- Hit! Run! Out! (1998)
- 6 Band "99" (1999)
- Tribute Album – Somorpon (সমর্পণ) (2011)

== Members ==
Present members

- Sheikh Monirul Alam Tipu – drums, percussion, band leader (1985–present)
- Ibrahim Ahmed Kamal – lead guitar (1985-2003, 2007-present); bass (1984-1985)
- Palash Noor – vocals (2016-present)
- Samir Hafiz – lead guitar (2015-present)
- Soumen Das – rhythm guitar (2018-present)
- Naim Haque Roger – bass guitar (2003-present)
- Shams Mansoor Ghani – keyboard (1999-present)

Past members

- Sunjoy – vocals (1990–1998)
- Babna Karim – bass, vocals (1986–1996)
- Balam – vocals, guitar (1999–2007)
- Mizan Rahman – vocals (1999–2002, 2007-2016)
- Iqbal Asif Jewel – guitar, vocals (1997–1999)
- Sazzad Arefeen – guitar (2001–2007)
- Oni Hasan – guitar (2007-2014)
- Saidus Salehin Khaled Sumon – bass guitar, vocals (1997–1998)
- Biju – bass guitar (1999-2002)
- Saef Al Nazi (Cézanne) – bass guitar (2002–2003)
- Russel Ali – keyboard, guitar (1990–1994)
- Romel Ali – keyboard
- Fuad Ibne Rabbi – keyboard, guitar (1994–1999)
- Helal – drums, (1984–1985)
- Bapi – vocals (1984–1985)
- Meer – guitar (1984–1985)
- Naimul – lead guitar (1984–1988)
- Reshad – vocals (1985–1990)
- Mashuk Rahman - Guitar (1988 -1991)

== See also ==
- List of hard rock musicians (N–Z)
- Music of Bangladesh
