= Tasher Desh =

2012 film

Tasher Desh (The Land of Cards)
- Poster
- Directed by: Qaushiq Mukherjee, known as 'Q'
- Written by: Q/ Surojit Sen
- Screenplay by: Q/ Surojit Sen
- Story by: Rabindranath Tagore
- Based on: Tasher Desh by Rabindranath Tagore
- Produced by: NFDC (India) / Overdose Art Pvt Ltd / Dream Digital Inc / Anurag Kashyap Films / Entre Chien Et Loup
- Starring: Anubrata; Joyraj; Tillotama Shome; Rii; Tinu Verghis; Immaduddin Shah / Soumyak Kanti
- Cinematography: Manuel Dacosse/ Q
- Edited by: Nikon
- Music by: Neel Adhikari/ Miti Adhikari
- Distributed by: NFDC (India) / Insomnia World sales
- Release dates: 11 November 2012 (Rome); 23 August 2013 (India)
- Running time: 114 minutes
- Country: India
- Language: Bengali

Tasher Desh (transl. The Land of Cards) is a 2012 Bengali-language fantasy film directed by Q. The film has been described as a "trippy adaptation" of the 1933 Rabindrath Tagore play of the same name by Indian media. It begins with a nihilist playwright searching where the play, 'Tasher Desh' by Rabindranath Tagore is being played. He goes to major play theatres in Kolkata like The Academy of Fine Arts but no one has a show of Tasher Desh in the near time. He finally writes his own adapted script of the play by Tagore and completely immerses himself into it. Most of the dialogues and all the songs in the film are from the original play by Tagore while director Q is picturising himself as the playwright. It features Soumyak Kanti De Biswas, Anubrata Basu, Tillotama Shome, Rii, Joyraj Bhattacharjee, Tinu Verghis, and Immaduddin Shah in the lead roles. Tasher Desh made its international premiere on 11 November 2012 at the 7th Rome International Film Festival. The film had its release in India on 23 August 2013.

== Plot ==
The story is of a prince who escapes his destiny, the prison of his mind. He lands on a fascist island and incites women to revolt. It is a psychedelic fantasy about destiny and humanity, social control and Utopian revolution.

== Cast ==
- Tillotama Shome as Queen
- Imaad Shah as Ruiton
- Anubrata Basu as Friend
- Rii Sen as Horotoni / Widow
- Maya Tideman as Tekkani
- Soumyak Kanti De Biswas as Prince
- Joyraj Bhattacharjee as Storyteller / Tash King
- Tinu Verghis as Oracle

== Soundtrack ==
- "Ami Phul Tulite Elem" - Anusheh Anadil
- "Amar Mon Bole Chai" - Qaushiq Mukherjee
- "Amra Nuton Jouboneri" - Neel Adhikari
- "Bnadh Bhenge Dao" - Qaushiq Mukherjee, Tanaji, Neel, Damini, Kamalika
- "Bolo Shokhi Bolo" - Sahana Bajpaie
- "Cholo Niyom Mote" - Qaushiq Mukherjee, Tanaji, Neel, Damini, Kamalika
- "Elem Notun Deshe" - Qaushiq Mukherjee
- "Ghorete Bhromor Elo" - Anusheh Anadil
- "Gopono Kothati" - Susheela Raman, Qaushiq Mukherjee
- "Hey Nobina" - Qaushiq Mukherjee
- "Ichhe Ichhe" - Qaushiq Mukherjee, Neel, Damini, Kamalika
- "Jaboi" - Qaushiq Mukherjee
- "Khara Bayu Boye Bege" - Qaushiq Mukherjee, Neel, Damini, Kamalika
- "Ogo Shanto" - Qaushiq Mukherjee
- "Tash Anthem" - Qaushiq Mukherjee, Tanaji, Neel, Damini, Kamalika
- "Tolon Namon" - Qaushiq Mukherjee, Tanaji, Neel, Damini, Kamalika
- "Tomar Payer Tolaye" - Qaushiq Mukherjee
- "Utol Hawa" - Anusheh Anadil
