= She Je Boshe Ache =

Song by Arnob
- Language: Bengali
- Released: 2004
- Genre: Rock music, Acoustic music
- Label: Ektaar Music
- Composer: Arnob

She Je Boshe Ache is a Bangladeshi song, which was first released in 2004 as the title track of the teleplay Off Beat, which started at 36:55 of the teleplay. The original acoustic version, the one released in the teleplay, was written, composed, and sung by Arnob. Later, it was performed by Black in their compilation album Shopnochura which was released in the same year. In 2005, Arnob released the original version in his debut album Chaina Bhabish. However, because the Black version was released in 2004 (but after the release of the original version by Arnob in Off Beat earlier in 2004) and Arnob's original version was also included in his debut album Chaina Bhabish much later in 2005, many confused the version performed by Black to be the original one.

The song was a turning point in Arnob's career as it helped him to emerge into the Bangladeshi music scene. The song is still popular among the listeners, making it one of the most demanded songs in the concerts of Arnob as well as in the FM radio programs. The song was also used in the Kolkata film Aamra.
