= Ibrahim Ahmed Kamal =

Bangladeshi guitarist and composer (born 1969)

Ibrahim Ahmed Kamal ইব্রাহিম আহমেদ কমল
- Born: 2 May 1969 (age 57); Dhaka, East Pakistan
- Genres: Heavy metal; hard rock
- Occupations: Musician; songwriter; producer
- Instruments: Electric guitar; Bass guitar
- Years active: 1984–present
- Labels: G-Series; Ektaar; Sargam; Soundtek

Ibrahim Ahmed Kamal (born 2 May 1969) is a Bangladeshi guitarist, songwriter and producer. He is the lead guitarist and the founder of the heavy metal band Warfaze. He has been the band's guitarist and composer for three decades.

In his early days in Warfaze, he used to play bass. In the late 1987, he took the role of playing guitar. He had appeared on all the studio albums of Warfaze. In 2005 he left the band for Aurthohin, where he played guitars. He appeared in two albums of the band, including অসমাপ্ত (Unfinished) in 2008 and অসমাপ্ত ২ (Unfinished II) in 2008. He also won the Channel i best band of the year award with the band. And with Warfaze in 2009. In 2007, he returned to Warfaze and recorded their seventh studio album সত্য (Truth). In 2012, he took huge break from Warfaze due to his shoulder injuries.

The Daily Star described Kamal as a "Bona Fide Legend".

== Career ==
=== Warfaze (1984–) ===
In the mid 1984, Kamal formed the heavy metal band Warfaze with his friends, Bappi (vocals), Meer and Naimul (guitars) and Helal (drums). Kamal used to play bass. In late 1987, as guitarist Meer left the band, Kamal took up the guitar duties. He invited Babna Karim as a Bass Player. Monirul Alam Tipu joined the band in 1986 as a drummer, Reshad in 1987 as a vocalist. In the late 1980s, they used to cover songs of Black Sabbath, Deep Purple, Whitesnake and Dokken Iron Maiden, Scorpions, Def Leppard, Uriah Heep, Led Zeppelin, Kingdom Come etc. There is also a video of them covering Deep Purple's "Highway Star" in 1988. In 1990, vocalist Reshad left the band. Kamal recruited Sunjoy as the new vocalist and Russell Ali as Keyboards in 1990. They started recording songs for their self titled debut album in the Sargam Studio, Dhaka. They released their first album in 1991. Since then, Kamal has appeared on all the albums of the band as guitar player, composer, lyricist and music arrangements, music director.A vast majority of the riffs and solos of Warfaze are written by him.

Warfaze released their debut album WARFAZE in 1991. Kamal played all guitar solos and composed "Shadhikar", "Nistobdhota", and "Ratri". In 1994 Warfaze released their second album Obak Bhalobasha. In this album Warfaze utilized many different genres, including Western classical, Eastern classical, jazz, progressive rock, and psychedelic rock. Their 3rd album, Jibondhara was released in 1997. Kamal played all guitar solos and most of the guitar works. He also wrote his first lyrics for Warfaze and composed a number of songs on the album. Warfaze released 4th album Oshamajik in 1998. Kamal wrote lyrics and composed and arranged about half of the album.

In 2000 Kamal also composed the song Protikkha with the debut of the new vocalist Mizan. Warfaze released their 5th album Alo with a new line up the same year. In 6th album Maharaj (2003), Kamal composed and wrote lyrics of Shopno Tumi nao and shukh.

=== Aurthohin (2005–2013) ===
After releasing Moharaj album, Kamal took a break from Warfaze in 2005. He decided to leave the music industry permanently until he was persuaded by Sumon to join Aurthohin. He played guitars in two studio albums of the band, including অসমাপ্ত (Unfinished) and অসমাপ্ত ২ (Unfinished II) in 2008 and 2011, respectively. He played lead guitar for the band along Shishir. In 2013, he officially left the band. He won the Channel i best band of the year award with Aurthohin in 2008.

=== Injuries, retirement, present status ===
In 2010, Kamal told the doctor that he was suffering from arm and shoulder problems eventually it turned out that his left arm and shoulder was becoming weak. Doctors told him to stop playing guitars, but he didn't think of retiring or stop performing on live shows then.

In 2017 December. Kamal had to announce his inability to perform on stage due to shoulder and finger injuries for indefinite time. In 2018 March, Kamal went back on playing on stage after recovering from frozen shoulder and still actively present at all major concerts after 2010. Kamal is still playing with Warfaze as of 2026. He is working on various musical projects, including the long-awaited ninth album of Warfaze.

== Discography ==
=== Band (Warfaze) ===
- Warfaze (1991)
- অবাক ভালোবাসা (Astonishing Love) (1994)
- জীবনধারা (Living System) (1997)
- অসামাজিক (Antisocial) (1998)
- আলো (Light) (2001)
- সত্য (Truth) (2012)

==== Compilation albums ====
- পথচলা (Walking on Path) (2007)
- Best Collection Warfaze 4 in 1 (1999)

==== Mixed albums ====
- ধুন (Tune) (1997)
- সাবাশ বাংলাদেশ (Well done Bangladesh) (1998)
- 6 Band '99 (1999)
- সমর্পণ (Surrender) (2011) Producer
- Underground (2006)
- Underground 2 (2007).

=== Aurthohin ===
- অসমাপ্ত (Unfinished) (2008)
- অসমাপ্ত ২ (Unfinished II) (2011)
