= Shikawr =

Studio album by Sahana Bajpaie & Gorki Mukherjee
- Released: October 2014
- Recorded: Kolkata
- Studio: Sound House Blues, Red Earth Dream Productions
- Length: 32:57
- Label: Cozmik Harmony (India); ME Label (Bangladesh)
- Producer: Saptarshi Routh

Sahana Bajpaie & Gorki Mukherjee chronology
Notun Kore Pabo Bole (2007)	Shikawr (2014)	Mon Bandhibi Kemone (2016)

Shikawr (Bengali: শেকড়) is the second studio album by Bangladeshi-Indian singer-songwriter Sahana Bajpaie and Gorki Mukherjee. Samantak Sinha arranged and Saptarshi Routh wrote and composed the songs of this album. It was released in October 2014 by Cozmik Harmony from Kolkata, India.

== Track listing ==
No.	Title	Artist	Length
1.	"Bari Kothay"	Sahana Bajpaie	4:43
2.	"Chawl Ekdin"	Gorki Mukherjee	5:15
3.	"Magic (feat. Samantak Sinha)"	Sahana Bajpaie	5:40
4.	"Shikawr"	Sahana Bajpaie	5:07
5.	"Runway"	Sahana Bajpaie	3:15
6.	"Super Hero"	Gorki Mukherjee	4:27
7.	"Chawl Ekdin II"	Sahana Bajpaie	4:30
Total length:			32:57

== Personnel ==
- Saptarshi Routh - lyrics, composition, and production
- Samantak Sinha – backing vocals, acoustic guitar, harmonica
- Sunny Bhattacharya – acoustic guitar, bass guitar
- Sabyasachi Dasgupta (Johnny) – electric guitar
- Prasenjit 'Pom' Chakrabutty – nylon string guitar
- Bunty – drums, percussions
- Subhayu Sen Majumdar – esraj
- Rahul Sarkar – keyboard
- Satyaki Banerjee – rabab and oud
- Ashish Biswas – cello
- Tapas Bhowmick – accordion
