= Tomar Ghore Bosot Kore Koyjona =

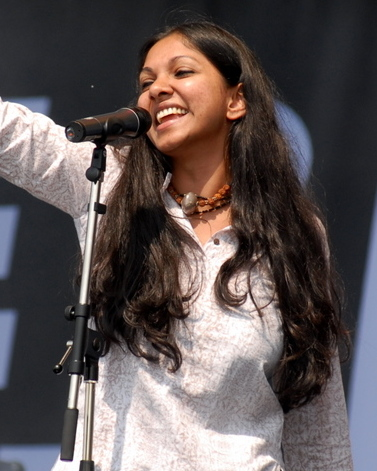
- Anusheh Anadil provided vocals for the song on the album Kingkortobbobimur

Song by Anusheh Anadil

from the album Kingkortobbobimur
- Written: Jahid Ahmed
- Published: 2002
- Released: 2002
- Genre: Baul, modern Bengali folk music, mystic Dehatattva (body philosophy)
- Length: 3:45
- Songwriter: Jahid Ahmed
- Composer: Jahid Ahmed
- Lyricist: Jahid Ahmed

“Tomar Ghore Bosot Kore Koyjona” (Bengali: তোমার ঘরে বসত করে কয়জনা) is a Bangladeshi Bengali folk song associated with the maromi dehotattva (the philosophy of the human body) tradition. It was written and composed by Zahid Ahmed. The song became known to a wider audience in 2002 after it was included in Kingkortobbobimur, the debut album of the folk-fusion band Bangla. Anusheh Anadil sang the song on the album.

The song is often attributed to the Baul saint Lalon Shah. However, it was written by Zahid Ahmed in the late 20th century and is a modern spiritual folk composition.

The song is based on ideas from Baul dehotattva (the philosophy of the human body). The “home” in the song does not refer to a physical or geographical dwelling, but to the human body and mind. It focuses on conflicting tendencies within human beings, such as creative desire and self-destructive impulses, discipline and distraction, and restraint and the attraction of desire.

The song expresses these ideas through folk metaphors. It has been performed beyond the traditional Baul music setting, including by modern rock bands and at international events.

== Lyrics ==
Bengali original

তোমার ঘরে বাস করে কারা, ও মন জান না,
তোমার ঘরে বসত করে কয়জনা, মন জান না।
তোমার ঘরে বসত করে কয়জনা।

একজনে ছবি আঁকে এক মনে, ও মন,
আরেকজনে বসে বসে রং মাখে।
ও আবার সেই ছবিখান নষ্ট করে,
কোন জনা, কোন জনা?
তোমার ঘরে বসত করে কয়জনা।

একজনে সুর তোলে একতারে, ও মন,
আরেকজনে মন্দিরাতে তাল তোলে।
ও আবার বেসুরা সুর ধরে দেখো,
কোন জনা, কোন জনা?
তোমার ঘরে বসত করে কয়জনা।

রস খাইয়া হইয়া মাতাল, ঐ দেখো,
হাত ফসকে যায় ঘোড়ার লাগাম।
সেই লাগামখানা ধরে দেখো,
কোন জনা, কোন জনা?
তোমার ঘরে বসত করে কয়জনা।

Romanisation of Bengali

Tomar ghore bas kore kara, o mon jan na,
Tomar ghore boshot kore koyjona, mon jan na.
Tomar ghore boshot kore koyjona.

Ekjon-e chhobi anke ek mone, o mon,
Arekjon-e boshe boshe rong makhe.
O abar shei chhobikhān noshto kore,
Kon jona, kon jona?
Tomar ghore boshot kore koyjona.

Ekjon-e shur tole ektare, o mon,
Arekjon-e mondirate tal tole.
O abar besura shur dhore dekho,
Kon jona, kon jona?
Tomar ghore boshot kore koyjona.

Ros khaiya hoiya matal, oi dekho,
Hat foske jay ghoṛar lagam.
Shei lagamkhana dhore dekho,
Kon jona, kon jona?
Tomar ghore boshot kore koyjona.

English translation

O mind, do you not know who lives in your house?
How many dwell in your house, do you not know, O mind?
How many dwell in your house?

One draws a picture with a single-minded devotion, O mind,
While another sits and smears it with colour.
Then another comes and ruins that very picture—
Which one, which one?
How many dwell in your house?

One plays a melody on the one-stringed instrument, O mind,
While another keeps the rhythm on the mandira.
Then another sings out of tune, look—
Which one, which one?
How many dwell in your house?

Look, intoxicated after drinking the juice,
The reins of the horse slip from the hand.
Now look and see who grasps those reins—
Which one, which one?
How many dwell in your house?
