= Lubna Marium =

Bangladeshi dancer

- লুবনা মরিয়ম
- Born: 8 July 1954 (age 71)
- Occupations: Dancer, artistic director, cultural activist
- Children: Anusheh Anadil
- Father: Quazi Nuruzzaman
- Awards: Full list

Lubna Marium (born 8 July 1954) is a Bangladeshi dancer, art director, researcher and cultural activist.

== Biography ==
Marium participated in the Liberation War of 1971 by assisting in the Advanced Dressing Center located at the Mohdipur Mukti Bahini Camp of Sector 7, near Chapainawabganj. She was also associated with the ‘Mukti-Shongrami Shilpi Shongstha’, an artists’ group formed in Kolkata during the Liberation War of Bangladesh in 1971.

From 1999 to 2005 Marium studied dance in India, after which time she returned to Bangladesh to promote classical dance.

The Government of Bangladesh awarded her the Shilpakala Padak award in 2019 for her special contribution to dance. She can be seen in the popular documentary film Muktir Gaan.

== Personal life ==
Marium is married to Jamal Ahmed Sufi with whom she has a daughter, singer Anusheh Anadil. Her father was Lieutenant Colonel Quazi Nuruzzaman.

== Awards ==
- Biswaratna Dr Bhupen Hazarika International Solidarity Award (2013)
- 71 Foundation Shommanona Award (2016)
- Prayas Sammanana Award (2018)
- Shilpakala Padak (2019)
- Nagad and Bangla Tribune ‘50 Years of Independence Award (2022)
