= Biswaratna Dr Bhupen Hazarika International Solidarity Award =

Award sponsored by the Assam Literary Society

- Sponsored by: Assam Sahitya Sabha
- Rewards: A trophy, a citation and a cheque of INR 500,000
- First award: 2013
- Final award: 2024

Highlights
- Total awarded: 6
- First winner: Lubna Marium
- Last winner: George Baker

The Biswaratna Dr Bhupen Hazarika International Solidarity Award (Assamese: বিশ্বৰত্ন ড॰ ভূপেন হাজৰিকা আন্তঃৰাষ্ট্ৰীয় সমন্বয় বঁটা) was instituted by the Assam Sahitya Sabha and sponsored by the Numaligarh Refinery Limited (NRL). The award, conferred biennially, consists of a trophy, a citation, and a cheque of ₹ five hundred thousand.

== Recipients ==
- 2013: Lubna Marium
- 2015: Adoor Gopalakrishnan
- 2017: Prasanna Vithanage
- 2019: Eric Khoo
- 2021: Dr. Anil Saikia
- 2024: George Baker
