= Winning (band) =

Bangladeshi rock band

Winning উইনিং
- Origin: Dhaka, Bangladesh
- Genres: soft rock
- Years active: 1983–Present
- Members: Chandan Zaman Ali; Ranjan; Kiron; Paul; Shomi; Alice (Sharif)
- Past members: Sheikh Monirul Alam Tipu; Hyder Husyn; Shelly; Biplop; Rana; Fahim

Winning is a Bangladeshi rock band that formed in Dhaka on 1 January 1983.

== History ==
In the 70s some members of pop king Azam Khan's band decided to do some songs themselves. Then in 1983 the winning band was formed which consisted of Haider Hossain (Guitar & Vocals), Mitul (Guitar & Vocals), Ranjan (Drums & Vocals, Shelly (Bass Guitar), Rana (Keyboard), Faheem (English Vocals). They first participated in a TV program called Nirjar. Between 1984 and 1985, band members Mitul, Haider, Fahim and Rana migrated to America for a better life and studies. Then some members joined the band. In 1985 Babu joined on guitar and vocals, Reza on rhythm guitar and vocals, Reza Khan on guitar and keyboard and Biplab joined on keyboard in 1986.

Around 1986–87, Winning Band began searching for their original vocalist. They kept James of the present Nagar Baul band to practice with the band for some time. Later in 1987 Chandan joined the band as guitarist and vocalist. In 1988, Ranjan was injured while playing cricket and broke his finger and was no longer able to play the drums. In this situation, Tipu joined the band as a drummer. In 1991, their self-titled album Winning was released and Babu and Reza left the band. Then Biplab and Sajal Manager joined the band as new members on keyboards.

The years 1991 to 1994 were the band's most successful period. During this time they participated in various concerts. In 1994, the band broke up again. Ranjan decided to take a break from the band, Shelly started his career in a tea plantation in Sylhet and Sajal got busy with his business. At that time Mobin joined the band who was later killed in a road accident. In 1995, the band's 2nd album "Ochena Shohor" was released. From 1995 to 1997, the band underwent many changes. Tipu left the band and was replaced by Eamon, Mobin left the band to work as a sound engineer. Eventually, Morshed Baez joined the band as guitarist and vocalist and guitarist Russell joined the band. In 1998, Eamon left the band and Chandan moved to England for higher education for 1 year. During this time, the band's activities stalled. In 2000, Winning Band's Nescafé Unplugged concert at the Sheraton was a huge success.

== Discography ==
- Winning (1991)
- Ochena Shohor (1995)
- Probashe: Sharing the memories from Canada (2003)
- Bohu Durey (2016)

== Members ==
Present members

- Chandan Zaman Ali – Vocal and Guitar
- Ranjan – Vocal and Guitar
- Kiron – Drums
- Paul – Bass
- Shomi – Keyboards
- Alice (Sharif) – Percussion
