= Rajib Ashraf =

Rajib Ashraf (December 17, 1982 - September 1, 2023) was a Bangladeshi writer, lyricist, filmmaker and actor.

== Career ==
Ashraf was best known for his collaboration with musician Arnob. Ashraf wrote "Hok Kolorob", the title track of Arnob's second studio album, and they co-wrote the songs 'Prokrito Jol', 'Naam Chilo Na', 'Ghum', 'Dhushor Megh', 'Rod Boleche Hobe', 'Prtoddhoni', 'Ekta Meye' and others. He wrote lyrics for Airtel telefilms, as well as jingles for Banglalink, Mojo and others.

Ashraf was also an actor, appearing in plays and television shows. As a filmmaker he made Mirror Game (2016), Bahattor Ghonta (2011) and IceCream (2016).

== Death ==
Ashraf died on September 1, 2023, at Dhaka Medical College Hospital after a severe asthma attack.
