= Arnob & Friends Live =

Live album by Arnob
- Released: 2009
- Genre: Experimental music
- Label: Bengal Music Company
- Producer: Arnob

Arnob chronology
| Doob (2008) | Arnob & Friends Live (2009) | Rod Boleche Hobe (2010) |

Arnob & Friends Live is an album by Arnob, released in 2009.

== History ==
Drishtipat (a non-profit human rights organisation by non-resident Bangladeshis) worked with Arnob and his fellow artists to hold charity concerts titled 'The Unheard Voices World Tour'. Bengal Music Company Ltd released an album titled Arnob & Friends Live with songs played by the band during their concert tour. The album was sponsored by HSBC.

== Track List ==
- 01. Amay Dhore Rakho – Arnob
- 02. Lalpahari – Arnob
- 03. Amay Bhashailire – Nazia Ahmed
- 04. Hok Kolorob – Arnob
- 05. Chai – Arnob
- 06. Ore Neel Doria – Nazia Ahmed
- 07. Tomar Jonno – Arnob
- 08. Bhalobasha Tarpor – Arnob
- 09. Piya Ki Nazarya – Nazia Ahmed
- 10. Hariye Giyechi – Arnob
- 11. Majhe Majhe – Arnob
- 12. Nao Chariya De – Arnob & Nazia Ahmed

== Personnel ==
- Shayan Chowdhury Arnob – Vocals, Guitar
- Nazia Ahmed – Vocals
- Andrew Morris – Saxophone
- Resalat – Bass guitar
- Jibon – Drums
- Nazrul - Dhol
