= Hyder Husyn =

Bangladeshi singer-songwriter

Hyder Husyn হায়দার হোসেন
- Born: Syed Hyder Husyn; 9 October 1963 (age 62); Begum Bazar, Old Dhaka, Bangladesh
- Genres: Pop; Folk; pop rock
- Occupations: Aeronautical engineer; Singer; songwriter
- Instruments: Vocals; guitar
- Years active: 1979–continuing
- Website: www.hyderhusyn.com

Syed Hyder Husyn (born 9 October 1963) is a Bangladeshi singer-songwriter.

== Career ==
Before starting his career as a singer, Hyder was an aircraft engineer. His first album is Faisa Gechi, under Ektaar Music Ltd label, was officially launched on 8 May 2005. He has released a controversial single, "Gonotontro". He wrote a few songs like "Mon Ki Je Chai" for the 90s band Winning.

== Discography ==
- Faisa Gechi (2005)
- Shopno
- Na Bola Kotha
- Prottasha (2011)
- Khola Akash (2016)
