= Kazi Nuruzzaman =

Bangladeshi war hero

Kazi Nuruzzaman Bir Uttom
- Born: 24 March 1925; Chuchura, Bengal, British India
- Died: 6 May 2011 (aged 86); Dhaka, Bangladesh
- Burial place: National Freedom Fighters' Graveyard
- Military career
- Allegiance: British India; Pakistan; Bangladesh
- Branch: British Indian Army; Pakistan Army; Mukti Bahini; Bangladesh Army
- Service years: 1946-1961, 1971-1972
- Rank: Lieutenant colonel
- Unit: Regiment of Artillery
- Commands: Commander of Sector – VII
- Conflicts: Bangladesh Liberation War; Battle of Hilli
- Awards: Bir Uttom

Kazi Nuruzzaman Bir Uttom (24 March 1925 – 6 May 2011) was a Bangladeshi war hero and secular nationalist, who served as one of the principal commanders of the Mukti Bahini during the Bangladesh Liberation War. He also rejected Bir Uttam award as a tribute to all the unknown, unrecognized martyrs of the war.

== Early life ==
Kazi Nuruzzaman was born into a prominent Bengali Muslim family to Kazi Sadrul Ala and Ratabunesa Begum on 24 March 1925. His father Kazi Sadrul Ala was given the title Khan Saheb by the erstwhile ruling British Raj for his services to society. He was educated at the prestigious St Xavier's School and College at Kolkata. He passed his Matriculation examination in 1939 and I.Sc in 1941 from there, he finished off his education from St Xavier's School and College with a Bachelor of Science in chemistry with honors.

== Career ==
He joined the British Indian Navy on 6 June 1943 but due to Jawaharlal Nehru's persuasion, he transferred to the army in 1946 and completed his training from Royal School of Artillery in the UK. After the partition of India in 1947 he joined Pakistan army. In 1949 he was assigned as platoon commander for the Joint Pre-Cadet Training School in Quetta. He was promoted to major in 1954. Before retiring from the armed forces he served at East Pakistan Industrial Development Corporation.

Since he was a Bengali in the Pakistan Army, he was subject to discrimination. He did not sacrifice his dignity, and one such example was his comment against Ayub Khan:

Only people from good families can recognize other people from other good families.

- Kazi Nuruzzaman when Ayub Khan said that he did not see people from good families in East Pakistan.

In October 1958 after Ayub Khan declared Martial Law in Pakistan, he and Major Salauddin Amin were the only two officers who refused to sign a document of allegiance pledging loyalty to then President of Pakistan Ayub Khan.

In 1961 he left the army and was transferred to East Pakistan Industrial Development Corporation. He served there till 1970. In 1970 he resigned from EPIDC because of some differences of opinion with EPIDC authorities.

== Bangladesh Liberation War ==
In 1971, he joined the Liberation War. He was senior to all the sector commanders & was given staff position by C-in-C Osmani.

During the war, Bangladesh was divided into eleven sectors and each of those sectors had a Sector Commander who would direct the guerrilla warfare. He succeeded Major Najmul Haque as Commander of Sector 7 who died in a road crash on 27 September 1971, in India. He played a key role in Bangladesh's achieving independence from Pakistan during the 1971 war. During the war he was promoted to the rank of lieutenant colonel.

Post war he was tasked with gathering injured freedom fighters from Kolkata.

== Award ==
Nuruzzaman was awarded the Bir Uttom award, which is the second-highest award for individual gallantry in Bangladesh. As thousands of Mukti Bahini volunteers, mostly farmers, were killed and did not receive any recognition, he chose not to accept any gallantry award. He rejected the Bir Uttom award.

== Personal life ==
Nuruzzaman's daughter Naila Khan is married to Shahidullah Khan Badal, publisher of the New Age. His another daughter is dancer Lubna Mariam. His granddaughter Anusheh Anadil is married to musician Buno, son of Awami League politician Imran Ahmad.

== Death ==
Nuruzzaman died of old age at Square Hospital on 6 May 2011. He was buried at National Freedom Fighters' Graveyard at Dhaka Cantonment.
