= Notun Kore Pabo Bole =

Studio album by Sahana Bajpaie
- Released: 6 March 2007
- Venue: Dhaka
- Genre: Rabindra Sangeet
- Length: 57:12
- Label: Bengal Music Company
- Producer: Bengal Music Company

Sahana Bajpaie chronology
Notun Kore Pabo Bole (2007)	Shikawr (2014)

Notun Kore Pabo Bole (Bengali: নতুন করে পাবো বলে) is the debut studio album by Bangladeshi-Indian singer-songwriter Sahana Bajpaie, which is a collection of Rabindra Sangeet. It was released on 6 March 2007 from Bengal Music Company, Dhaka, with compositions by Shayan Chowdhury Arnob.

== Track listing ==
All lyrics and music written by Bengali poet Rabindranath Tagore.

No.	Title	Length
1.	"Oi Je Jhorer Meghey"	5:23
2.	"Mor Bhabonarey"	3:05
3.	"Eto Din Jey Boshey Chilem"	3:19
4.	"Tomar Khola Hawaa"	5:06
5.	"Amaar Nishitho Raater Badool Dhaara"	4:02
6.	"Tomareyi Koriachi Jiboner Dhrubotara"	4:52
7.	"Tumi Kon Pothey Je Eley"	4:59
8.	"Fooley Fooley Dholey Dholey"	4:59
9.	"Aaj Josna Raatey"	6:37
10.	"Kon Puraaton Praaner Taaney"	2:15
Total length:		57:12

== Personnel ==
- Shayan Chowdhury Arnob - composition
