= Adheko Ghume =

Studio album by Shayan Chowdhury Arnob
- Released: 2012
- Genre: Rabindra Sangeet
- Label: Adhkhana Music
- Producer: Shayan Chowdhury Arnob

Shayan Chowdhury Arnob chronology
Rod Boleche Hobe (2010)	Adheko Ghume (2012)	Khub Doob (2015)

Adheko Ghume (Bengali: আধেক ঘুমে) is an album by Bangladeshi artist Shayan Chowdhury Arnob released in 2012. It is a collection of his renditions of twelve Rabindra Sangeet.

== Track list ==
No.	Title	Length
1.	"Fagun Haway"
2.	"Adheko Ghume"
3.	"Shawon Gagane"
4.	"Gaaner Shurer"
5.	"Ami Kaan Pete Roi"
6.	"Megh Boleche"
7.	"Kotha Hote Baaje"
8.	"Dhonilo Re"
9.	"Prochondo Gorojon e"
10.	"Purano Shei"
11.	"Rakho Rakhore"
12.	"Amar Deen Phuralo"
13.	"Robir Gaan"
