= Warfaze (album) =

- Album cover art of Warfaze's first self titled album

Studio album by Warfaze
- Released: 21 June 1991
- Recorded: 1990–91
- Genre: Hard rock; heavy metal
- Length: 55:25
- Label: Sargam

Warfaze chronology
Warfaze (1991)	অবাক ভালোবাসা (Astonishing Love) (1994)

Warfaze is the self-titled debut album by Bangladeshi heavy metal band Warfaze. It was released from Sargam in 1991 in cassette format with a later CD release in the late '90s. The CD was also re-released by Sargam in 2008. The album featured hits like "Boshe Achhi", "Ekti Chhele", "Bichchhinno Abeg", "Shadhikhar" etc. and during that time, this sound was unheard of in the Bangladeshi band music scene.

== Significance ==
Lyrics other than romanticism and patriotism were rare, so it took a while for this music to be accepted, especially in a band music scene where Pop largely dominated as the mainstream music of choice for bands. Warfaze, along with Rockstrata, In Dhaka and Aces are the sole reason why this genre of music became so popular, and gave way to the popularization of Progressive Rock, Progressive Metal and Hard Rock bands that emerged in the late '90s and early 2000s from the Underground era.

== Track listing ==
Side A
No.	Title	Length
1.	"Ekti Chele"	6:50
2.	"Boshe Achi"	5:49
3.	"Bicchinno Abeg"	5:27
4.	"Shadhikar"	4:47
5.	"Nistobdhota"	4:48

Side B
No.	Title	Length
6.	"Koishore"	5:47
7.	"Asha"	5:10
8.	"Ratri"	4:23
9.	"Brishti Nemeche"	6:07
10.	"Shondha"	6:27

== Personnel ==
- Sunjoy - lead vocals
- Babna Karim - bass guitar, vocals
- Ibrahim Ahmed Kamal - lead guitars
- Sheikh Monirul Alam Tipu - drums
- Russell ali - guitar, keyboard

== Influence ==
The album is considered as one of the earliest hard rock and heavy metal albums in Bangladesh. This was a pioneering rock album in Bangladesh where pop music was the dominant genre.
