= Anusheh Anadil =

Anusheh Anadil আনুশেহ্‌ অনাদিল
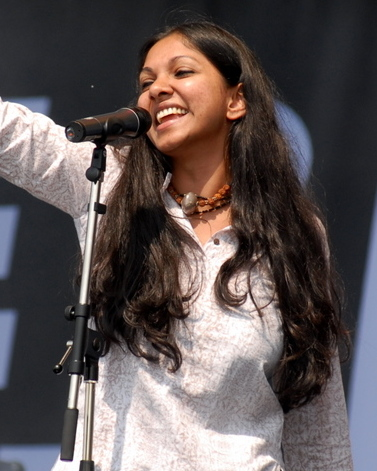
- Anusheh performing with her band Bangla in June 2007

Background information
- Origin: Dhaka, Bangladesh
- Genres: Folk music, Lalon Geeti
- Occupations: Musician, singer-songwriter, cultural activist, entrepreneur
- Instrument: vocal
- Years active: 1998–present
- Spouse: Seth Panduranga Blumberg (m. 2016)

Anusheh Anadil is a Bangladeshi musician, artist, cultural activist, and social entrepreneur. The band 'Bangla' was the first female lead band from Bangladesh that became iconically popular in both Bangladesh and West Bengal (India), for their first album Kingkortobbobimuro (2002). Their rendition of spiritual folk songs, along with their own original songs, became a revolution for bringing the sounds of the village bard into popular culture. They helped popularize the philosophy of Fakir Lalon Shai, as a breath of fresh air, to the urban youth. Bangla's second album Prottutponnomotitto (2005) is a tribute to Fakir Lalon Shai. The album questions religious extremism and corrupt politics by using songs of the insightful mystic. The band 'Bangla' inspired many young musicians from both sides of Bengal to rediscover their roots.

Anusheh is also a songwriter. She released her solo album Rai in 2012. Songs like 'Ekhon Bodhoy Phul Choranor Pala', 'Amar Moner Manush', 'Tuito Mojar Manush' and 'Dhormo Bujhe Manre Shokha' are some of the popular songs penned and composed by her. Anusheh's rendition of 'Tomar Ghorey Boshot Korey Koyjona', written by Zahid Ahmed, became one of the most popular songs of both Bengals. She was also the first musician in Bangladesh to speak openly about her history with drug abuse and how changing her lifestyle and reconnecting to her roots helped her transcend her addiction.

== Background and early life ==
Anadil was born in Dhaka on 26 March 1977 to Jamal Ahmed Sufi, an entrepreneur and Lubna Marium, a dancer and cultural activist. Anadil's mother, Lubna and her sister, Naila Khan, appeared in Tareque Masud's documentary film Muktir Gaan. Her maternal grandfather Lieutenant Colonel Quazi Nuruzzaman, Bir Uttam, was a Bangladeshi war hero and secular nationalist, who served as a Sector Commander of the Mukti Bahini, in Sector 7, during the Bangladesh Liberation War. As a child, Anadil was trained in North Indian classical music. Through her encounters with the Bauls and Fakirs of Bengal, she found freedom in the philosophy and music they presented. She began performing with the band Bangla in 1998.Shayan Chowdhury Arnob, who is immensely popular for his solo career, was also another member of Bangla band. Anusheh and Arnob knew each other since childhood because their parents were family friends. Arnob's father Shwapan Chowdhury, also appears in Tareq Masud's Muktir Gaan. The band started in Santiniketan when Anusheh and Buno (another member of Bangla) were visiting Arnob, while he was doing his bachelor's degree in Kalabhavan.

== Career ==
Anusheh is the founder and creative director of Jatra Bangladesh. It was founded in the year 2000 as a creative space that promotes and popularizes Bangladeshi arts and crafts. Jatra is a colorful sanctuary of Bangladesh's vibrant roots. Jatra's extension Jatra Biroti is a vegetarian/organic restaurant that promotes mindful living. It is also a space for local musicians and artists to showcase their unique and authentic talents. Jatra Biroti also promotes folk music. The album BHAAB of Baul Shofi Mandal, MA of Kangalini Sufia and ASHOR of Lokman Fakir was recorded and released under its banner. Anusheh has worked with musicians like Rob Fakir, Shofi Mandal, Sam Mills, Paban Das Baul, Susheela Raman, Pandit Tanmoy Bose, Debajyatri Mistra, Indrajeet Dasgupta, Surojit Chatterjee (Bhoomi), Kangalini Sufia, Joler Gaan, Joy Sarkar, Momtaz and the band Indian Ocean. She has sung for movies like Shekhar Das's Kaler Rakhal, Tareq Masud's Ontor Jatra, Shiboprosad Mukherjee and Nandita Roy's Ichche, Q's Tasher Desh, Enamul Karim Nirjhar's Aha and also sang the title song of the popular TV series 'Subarnalata'. Anusheh was invited to speak about her work at TEDex Dhaka in the year 2012

== Personal life ==
Anusheh married Seth Panduranga Blumberg, a disciple of Pandit Ravi Shankar, on 16 December 2016. She has two daughters, Arash and Raha, with her former husband, Buno. Buno is the son of Awami League politician Imran Ahmad.

== Awards ==
- "The Musical Journalist’s Award" (2006)
- "Annanya’s Sreshtho 10 Nari" (2007)
- "Meeto Memorial Award" (2009)
- "Daily Pratidin Award" for the "Best Title Song in a Soap Opera" (2011)

== See also ==
- Tomar Ghore Bosot Kore Koyjona
