= 2014 Jadavpur University protests =

2014 student protests of Jadavpur University

Hokkolorob Movement
- Hok kolorob Andolon
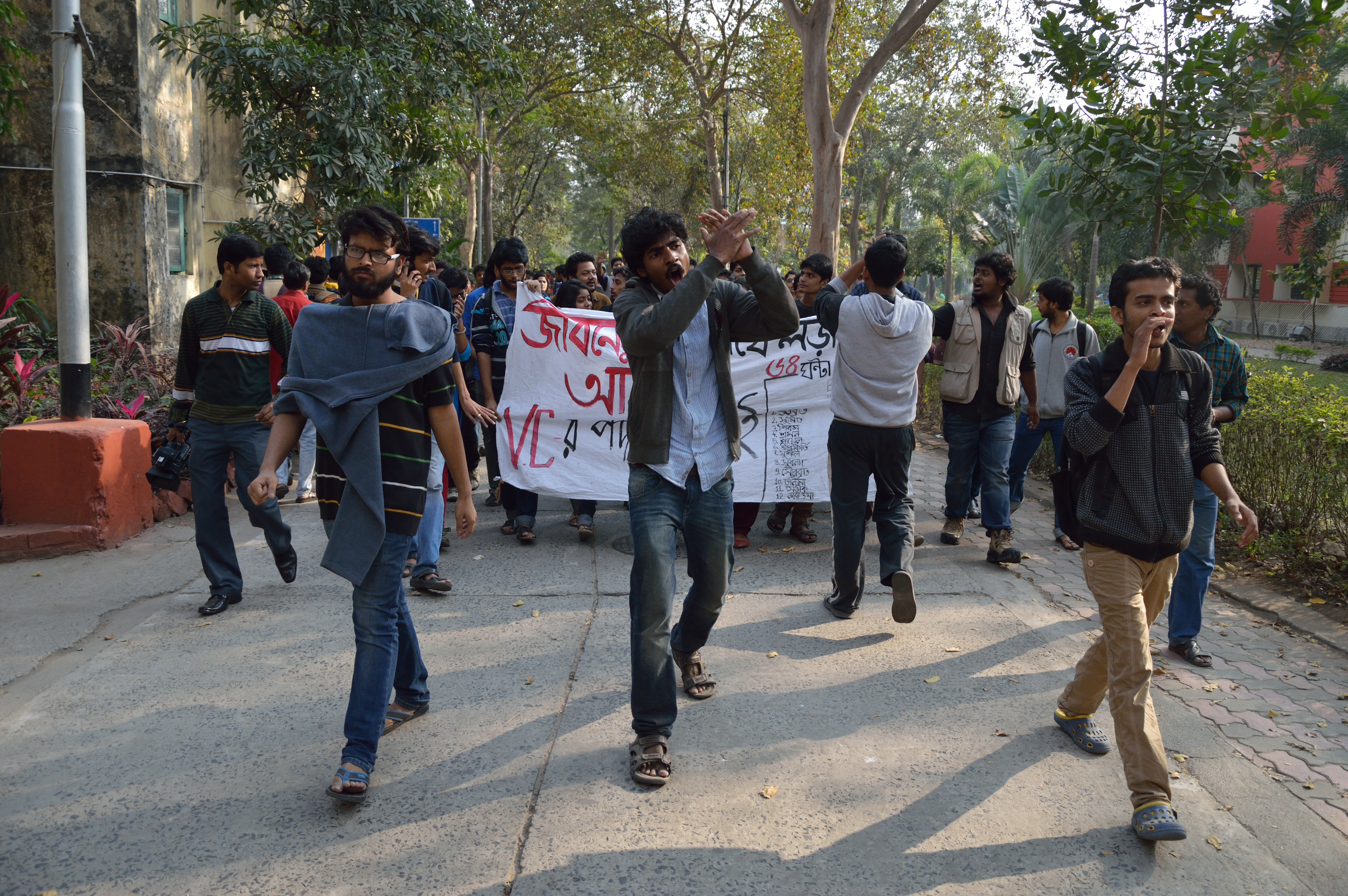
- Students rally against the vice chancellor at Jadavpur University campus, Kolkata, circa 8 January 2015
- Date: 3 September 2014 – 12 January 2015
- Location: Kolkata, Delhi, Mumbai, Hyderabad, Bengaluru, Chennai, Guwahati, India
- Caused by: Laxity in the investigation of an alleged case of molestation on campus; Police brutality on unarmed students taking part in a non-violent sit in demonstration
- Goals: An unbiased, transparent, fast investigation of the allegation with appropriate legal committee according to vishakha guidelines.
- Methods: Demonstrations; Internet activism; Hashtag activism
- Status: Successful: Resignation of the Vice Chancellor Abhijit Chakraborty

Parties
Protestors: Students' Federation of India; Communist Party of India (Marxist)	Government of West Bengal; West Bengal Police; Kolkata Police; Trinamool Congress; Trinamool Chhatra Parishad

Casualties
- Injuries: 40
- Arrested: 37

On 16 September 2014, peaceful demonstrations by students took place in front of the administrative building of the University, demanding an investigation into the alleged molestation of a female student in campus. After several unsuccessful attempts at dialogue with the authorities, the students gheraoed some personnel of the university authority, including Vice-Chancellor Abhijit Chakrabarti. The vice-chancellor called the police, who dispersed the students by force in the early hours of 17 September. This triggered a wave of protests by students and teachers.

Criticisms of the force included that police used baton charge on a peaceful demonstration, that female students were manhandled and molested by male police officers, and that several men who were not in uniform attacked the students. The police maintained that there were plainclothesmen among their ranks while the students insist that these were Trinamool Congress (the ruling party of the state of West Bengal) cadres. The official position of the Calcutta Police is that "minimum lawful force" was applied to escort the vice-chancellor and other members of the committee out of the university.

Demonstrations showing solidarity with the students started in Kolkata and across India, including in Delhi, Mumbai, Hyderabad, and Bengaluru. There was progressively increasing turnout in protest marches in Kolkata; it culminated in a rally on 20 September, at the end of which a delegation of students met Governor of West Bengal, Keshari Nath Tripathi. Estimates of participants in the rally fluctuate between thirty thousand and a hundred thousand people.

The protests had a strong cultural flavour: students sang, danced, and arranged diverse cultural manifestations throughout the days during the demonstration. The protests have a large oeuvre of posters, graffiti, poems, songs, slogans, street plays, and performances dotting the university campus and the streets of Kolkata. It led the Trinamool Congress to link this protest to the student movements of the 1970s. It is one of the first movements in India to significantly employ social media and internet activism for coordination and dissemination.

== Origins ==
On 28 August, a female second-year student at Jadavpur University was dragged into the Old Boys' Hostel on campus and molested, and her male friend beaten up, by 10 residents of the hostel. According to the girl's father, when he approached the interim vice-chancellor, Abhijit Chakrabarti, on 1 September, he was told to wait for a couple of days as Chakrabarti was going to New Delhi. The father lodged a police complaint on 2 September and sent a letter to the University authorities on 3 September, upon which an internal inquiry was ordered in the Vice-Chancellor's absence, believed to be at the behest of state Education Minister Partha Chatterjee. An Internal Complaints Committee (ICC) was formed in accordance with the Sexual Harassment of Women at Workplace Act, 2013 to investigate the matter. However, the committee was compromised when two of its members visited the girl's home in Bidhannagar on 5 September, refusing to identify themselves and asking questions about her dress on the night of the incident. It led to the girl filing a general diary with the Bidhannagar police station on 6 September for "mental harassment"; in the diary she identified them as professors of the Sanskrit and Women's Studies Departments of Jadavpur University.

A number of students then staged demonstrations demanding that the accused ICC committee members be replaced, as well as forming an "external committee", effectively the Local Complaint Committee (LCC) which was recommended by the Sexual Harassment Act, and demanding increased security for students within the campus. It was not acceptable to the vice-chancellor, but at the same time, he asked the students to wait until after the meeting of the executive councils on the evening of 16 September. At the meeting of the executive councils it was decided that it is not possible for a panelist to be replaced at some intermediate point of an investigation. The inability to replace panelists according to University officials, is mandated in the Vishaka Guidelines of the Supreme Court. The officials instead presented a letter which talked about students' code of conduct, totally deviating from the demands of the students.

On the evening of 16 September after the meeting of the executive councils finished, students encircled some of the university officials, including Vice-Chancellor Chakrabarti, in their offices. After several attempts to communicate and reach an understanding between the officials and the students, the situation reached an impasse, and the students continued their demonstration into the night. The vice-chancellor summoned police for protection.

=== 2014 student unrest ===
In 2014, Jadavpur University experienced significant student demonstrations. The protests centered around issues of campus governance and administrative policies, leading to widespread mobilization among the student body.

== Timeline ==
=== 17 September ===
The Kolkata Police arrived at the scene around 8 pm. Senior officials from the police department tried to negotiate with the students but could not come to a settlement. At around 2 am on 17 September, the lights at the entrance to the administrative building were suddenly turned off. It was followed by police assault on students, lifting the gherao and as a result completing the rescue operation. The police beat up several students and arrested 36. Some students were injured, and needed to be hospitalized.

Students say that the police force was aided by several civil-dressed outsiders (cadres of Trinamool Congress, according to students). The gherao was dismantled and the vice chancellor was escorted off the campus by the police. It was immediately followed by a road block by the students in front of the Jadavpur police station. Students have alleged that female students were manhandled by the police force.

==== Criticism ====
The incident of the beating of students by the police sparked nationwide reaction, with a high amount of protest on social media such as Facebook and Twitter. Videos of the attack on the students surfaced on the internet and TV channels.

=== 20 September ===
Students of the university have boycotted classes since the incident of police brutality. On 20 September, a rally was organized by students in the heart of the city, and was attended by students from the university, other educational institutions, and the general populace in a spontaneous outburst of outrage at the brutality with which the opposition to authority was stamped out. The rally ended peacefully with student representatives holding a meeting with the Governor of West Bengal, Keshari Nath Tripathi, who was also the chancellor of the university. Estimates of the number of participants in the rally vary between 30,000 and over 100,000 people. On the same day, protest demonstrations were held in several other Indian cities, showing solidarity with the students of Jadavpur University.

=== 22 September ===
On 22 September, a rally was arranged by the ruling Trinamool Congress party against the students. According to newspaper reports, school and college students from suburban and rural areas were dragged to the rally in order to showcase the power of the ruling party. The agitating students of Jadavpur University were mocked through slogans and posters.

=== 25 September ===
The Pro-Vice Chancellor of Jadavpur University resigned on 25 September 2014, citing that he was not part of the decision to call police inside university campus.

=== 7 October ===
On 7 October, notwithstanding protests by students demanding the resignation of the Interim Vice-Chancellor Chakrabarti, the Governor of West Bengal Keshrinath Tripathy, who is also the chancellor of the university, appointed Chakrabarti as the vice-chancellor for a period of four years.

=== 16 October ===
Marking a month since the police crackdown against agitating students at the University, students held a fire-torch rally in the evening and 700 students undertook a 24-hour hunger strike. The campus was full of posters and graffiti; students wore black badges, burned effigies of the vice-chancellor, and shouted slogans demanding his resignation.

=== 18 October ===
Classes began at JU on 18 October, but students refused to record attendance. Open air classes were held by professors as a mark of protest.

=== 24 December ===
Final year students who were to accept their graduation certificates and medals personally from the vice chancellor on 24 December refused to do so calling for a boycott of the convocation ceremony. A last-minute decision by the authorities to have the chancellor distribute the certificates rather than the vice chancellor, didn't stop protests. The chancellor was greeted with black flags and posters on entering the campus. The top graduating student from the arts faculty, Gitasree Sarkar, politely refused to accept her certificate and medal in the presence of the vice chancellor as a mark of protest. Other students followed suit and refused as well. The vice chancellor left the venue in the middle of the convocation ceremony.

=== 5 January 2015 ===
Students who had been attending classes without recording attendance as a sign of protest, intensified their protest by announcing a "fast unto death" strike on 5 January 2015. Ten students started the fast. In the ensuing days at least three of the eleven students were hospitalized. However more students joined and by 11 January, the number had swelled to at least 17. Parents announced a token fast of 24 hours on 12 January.

=== 12 January 2015 ===
After the "fast unto death" of almost 160 hours with active involvement from students, parents, and non-students members, the education minister arrived at JU on 12 January in an attempt to negotiate and persuade students to call off the fast. The chief minister of West Bengal, Mamata Banerjee arrived at JU shortly after. About 6:30 pm and after meeting with university officials, the chief minister emerged from the meeting and announced the vice chancellor's resignation.

== Support ==
Students, alumni, and teachers from major educational institutions in the city and from colleges from across the country have supported the protests. Alumni of the university arranged for demonstrations in New York, London, and Sydney. Participants of the 2013 Shahbag protests in Bangladesh expressed solidarity with the protests. A citizen's convention condemning the police brutality was arranged in the university campus on 24 September, which was attended by eminent educationists and intellectuals.

== Opposition ==
While students demanded an apology and resignation from the vice-chancellor, he said that he felt his life was threatened by the student protest which was why he called police.

The Commissioner of Police said in a press conference that police came on to the campus only at the request of the vice-chancellor. He accused students of offending police officers by using foul language to them. He also said that police were not carrying any lathis, so there was no question of any baton charge (lathi charge). It provoked criticism, as several video clips showed officers carrying lathis.

The main contention by the authorities (both the university and the state government), is that the students were not peaceful, and that the lives and safety of university officials, including the vice-chancellor, were under real and tangible threat from the students. Another point which was raised by the administration was the large presence of "outsiders" among the protesters-students and others who were not currently affiliated with Jadavpur University. According to Vice-Chancellor Chakrabarti in an interview with a news channel, the outsiders-alleged to be from rival political parties or to be drug-dealers who supply the student population-were the main element of the rowdiness that justified the use of punitive force.

== Influence ==
After the events at Jadavpur University, three other West Bengal universities, Presidency University in Kolkata, Burdwan University in Bardhaman, and Visva Bharati in Shantiniketan have seen similar student unrest. "The agitation in Presidency started predominantly due to the lack of information provided to students," says Suman Sen, a student of the university.

After the administration's decision which abolished the 50 percent internal quota for Visva Bharati's two school Patha Bhavana and Siksha Satra in undergraduate and postgraduate courses, about 400 students blocked the entry to the central and vice-chancellor's offices to protest. The protest resulted in class and annual examination boycotts. Speaking against the internal quota Amartya Sen remarked, "If our interest lies not in the greater good of the society, if our only concern is limited to the academic opportunism that would benefit our own children, and to this end we employ quotas, then it is safe to say that there is a fundamental lack in the thought process".

Siddharth Sivakumar who is an alumnus of Patha Bhavana, wrote in an article, "Those who have been drawing parallels between our and the Hokkolorob movement are misreading the situation. Hokkolorob was relevant in its unique context, but its application elsewhere as a readymade imported frame for protest may not yield the same results. While it was a movement by university students, ours was primarily by young school students, even students who are a good few years away from any public examinations or admission tests."
