= Mon Bandhibi Kemone =

Studio album by Sahana Bajpaie
- Released: September 27, 2016
- Venue: Palms Restaurant, Southern Avenue
- Genre: Bengali folk
- Length: 57:12
- Label: Hindustan Records Inreco
- Producer: Hindustan Records Inreco; Rabiul Islam

Sahana Bajpaie chronology
Ja Bolo Tai Bolo (2015)	Mon Bandhibi Kemone (2016)

Mon Bandhibi Kemone (Bengali: মন বান্ধিবি কেমনে) is the third studio album by Indian singer-songwriter Sahana Bajpaie. It was released on 27 September 2016 by Hindustan Records Inreco from Kolkata, India. This album arranged by some Bengali folk songs collection around the country and music composed by Samantak Sinha and Satyaki Banerjee.

== Track listing ==
No.	Title	Writer(s)	Length
1.	"Arshinagar"	Lalon	8:11
2.	"Maya"	Shah Abdul Karim	6:32
3.	"Ami Apar Hoye"	Lalon	8:25
4.	"Tomra Kunjo Sajao Go"	Shah Abdul Karim	5:25
5.	"Emon Manob Samaj"	Lalon	6:51
6.	"Amar Haat Bandhibi"	Shah Abdul Karim	4:59
7.	"Morile Kandishna"	Bidit Lal Das	7:43
8.	"Ekhono Sei Brindabone"	Bhaba Pagla	9:06
Total length:			57:12

== Personnel ==
- Mal Darwin
- Idris rahman
