= Sahana Bajpaie =

Indian singer, songwriter and contemporary Rabindra Sangeet vocalist

- Born: 6 February 1978 (age 48); Jalpaiguri, West Bengal, India
- Education: Patha Bhavana, Santiniketan; MA in English Literature, Visva-Bharati University, Santiniketan; MA in South Asian Studies, SOAS University of London; PhD in Music, King's College, University of London
- Occupations: Singer, music researcher
- Years active: 2000–present
- Known for: Rabindra Sangeet
- Musical career
- Origin: Santiniketan
- Genres: Rabindra Sangeet; fusion; folk
- Labels: Bengal Music Company, Hindustan Records Inreco
- Website: sahanabajpaie.com

Sahana Bajpaie (born 6 February) is an Indian singer-songwriter and a contemporary Rabindra Sangeet vocalist in Bengali. Born in Jalpaiguri and brought up in Santiniketan, Sahana started singing by the age of three. She released her debut album Notun Kore Pabo Bole in 2007 from Dhaka, Bangladesh, which was a collection of Rabindra Sangeet. Her second album Shikawr released in 2014 with several musicians from West Bengal. Sahana's second Rabindra Sangeet album Ja Bolo Tai Bolo was released in 2015 and the latest solo album, Mon Bandhibi Kemone in 2016.

In 2012, she made her first playback in the Indian Bengali fantasy film Tasher Desh directed by Q. Alongside Shayan Chowdhury Arnob, she has written several songs.

== Music career ==
=== Rabindra Sangeet ===
Since her music career Bajpaie released two Rabindra Sangeet albums. Notun Kore Pabo Bole was her debut album which was released on 6 March 2007, from Bengal Music Company, Dhaka. The album contained representation and arrangement of Tagore-songs.

Bajpaie's second solo album, Ja Bolo Tai Bolo, was released in September 2015. It is a collection of twelve Rabindra Sangeet recorded in London and Kolkata. Guitarist Oliver Weeks, pianist Zoe Rahman, and her brother, wind instrumentalist Idris Rahman, arranged three of the songs.

=== Later years ===
Her third solo album Mon Bandhibi Kemone released in 2016, was a collection of folk songs of Bengal, which Bajpaie and her associates had collected and arranged them in a contemporary format. Music arrangement of this album was done by Samantak Sinha and Satyaki Banerjee.

== Playback ==
In 2012, she made her first playback in the Indian Bengali fantasy film Tasher Desh. In 2013, Bengali comedy film Hawa Bodol which was directed by Parambrata Chattopadhyay. In 2016, she made a playback for the Bengali film Under Construction, and sang for Family Album by Mainak Bhaumik, which was a tune by Anupam Roy. In 2018, she sang for two films Ek Je Chhilo Raja, a film by Srijit Mukherjee and Rainbow Jelly, by Soukarya Ghosal. More recently, in the Shiboprasad and Nandita directed, Kontho, she sang the song, Shawbai Chup.

== Personal life ==
Sahana resides in London, where she serves as a senior teaching fellow in Bengali in the Department of the Languages and Cultures of South Asia at SOAS South Asia Institute. She has been awarded PhD in Music at King's College London.

== Discography ==
=== Studio albums ===
- Notun Kore Pabo Bole (Bengal Music Co., 2007)
- Shikawr w. Gorki Mukherjee (Cozmik Harmony, 2014)
- Ja BoloTai Bolo (2015)
- Mon Bandhibi Kemone (Hindusthan Inreco, 2016)

=== EP ===
- Ulto Katha Koi (NA, 2023) (w. Samantak Sinha)

=== Singles ===
- "Moloyo Batashe" (svf Music, 2017) (Music & Lyrics: Dwijendralal Ray)
- "Maarer Sagor" (svf Music, 2018) (Music & Lyrics: Rabindranath Tagore)
- "Manush Bhojle" (svf Music, 2018) (Music & Lyrics: Lalon Shah)
- "Prochondo Gorjone" (svf Music, 2018) (Music & Lyrics: Rabindranath Tagore)
- "Keyaphuler Alo" (2019) (Music: Samantak Sinha, Lyrics: Swadesh Misra)
- "Bone Jodi Phutlo Kusum" (Inreco Hindusthan, 2021) (Music & Lyrics: Rabindranath Tagore)
- "Jaat Gelo" (Inreco Hindusthan, 2021) (Music & Lyrics: Lalon Shah)
- "Ogo Shono Ke Bajay" (svf Music, 2022) (Music & Lyrics: Rabindranath Tagore)
- "Pothe Chole Jete Jete" (svf Music, 2022) (Music & Lyrics: Rabindranath Tagore)
- "Preme Jol Hoye Jao Gole" (svf Music, 2023) (Music & Lyrics: Rajanikanta Sen)

=== Playback ===
Year	Title	Film	Note	Ref.
2012	"Bolo Shokhi Bolo"	Tasher Desh	Rabindra Sangeet	
2013	"Mor Bhabonare" (w. Saptarshi Mukherjee)	Hawa Bodol	Rabindra Sangeet	
2014	"Tomay Gaan Shonabo"	Under Construction	Rabindra Sangeet	
2014	"Poush Toder"	Under Construction	Rabindra Sangeet	
2015	"Ektai Porichoy"	Family Album	Music & Lyrics: Anupam Roy	
2017	"Meghei Chhilo Thikthikana"	Shororipu	Music: Debojyoti Mishra Lyrics: Srijato	
2018	"Roopkotha"	Rainbow Jelly	Music: Nabarun Bose Lyrics: Soukarya Ghosal	
2018	"Maharajo Eki Saje"	Ek Je Chhilo Raja	Rabindra Sangeet	
2019	"Shobai Chup"	Konttho	Music: Prasen Lyrics: Dipangshu Acharya	
2021	"Mukh Pheray Na Mon"	Alpo Holeo Sotti	Music: Amit - Ishan Lyrics: Barish	
2022	"Rong Dhoreche"	Mahananda	Music: Bickram Ghosh Lyrics: Shubhendu Das Munshi	
2022	"Amar E Path"	Mahananda	Rabindra Sangeet	
2022	"Baynabilashi" (w. Samantak Sinha)	X=Prem	Music: Saptak Sanai Das Lyrics: Dhrubojyoti Chakrabarty	
2022	"Shaajo Shaajao"	Ballabhpurer Roopkotha	Music: Debraj Bhattacharya Lyrics: Anirban Bhattacharya	
2023	"Jibon Jakhon Chilo"	Ardhangini	Rabindra Sangeet	
2024	"Shawkaatore Oi"	Padatik	Rabindra Sangeet	
2024	"Ratri Eshe"	Shororipu 2: Jotugriho	Rabindra Sangeet	
2025	"Jakhan Esechile"	Bhutopurbo	Rabindra Sangeet	
2025	"Modhuro Tomar"	Aamar Boss	Rabindra Sangeet	
