= Patha Bhavana, Santiniketan =

School associated with Visva-Bharati University

Patha Bhavana
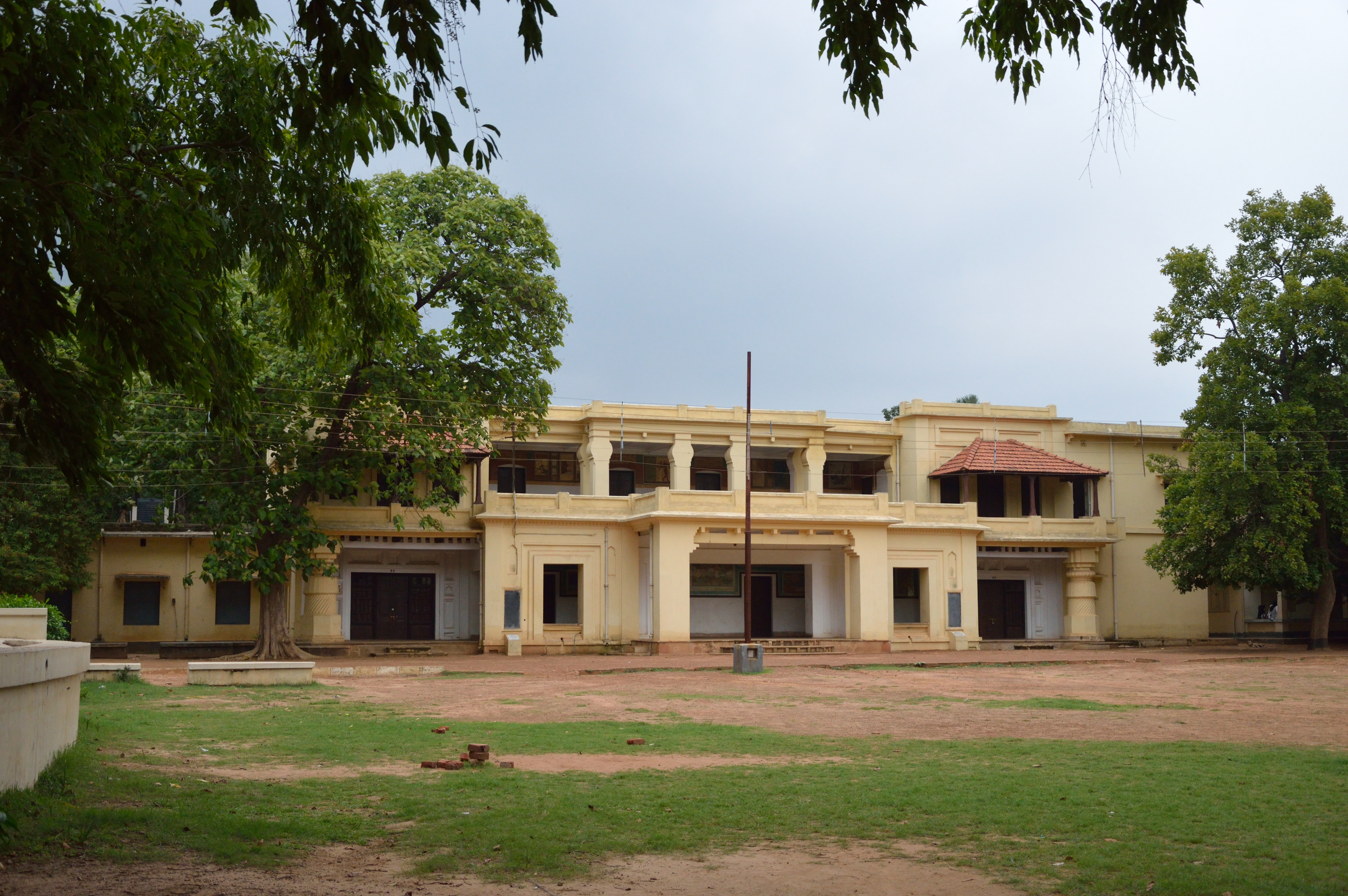

Location
- Santiniketan, West Bengal; India; 23.6805°N 87.6854°E

Information
- Established: 1901
- Founder: Rabindranath Tagore
- Affiliation: Visva-Bharati University
- Website: www.visvabharati.ac.in/PathaBhavana.html

Patha Bhavana is an institution of primary and secondary education in Santiniketan, West Bengal, India. Founded by Nobel laureate Rabindranath Tagore in 1901, starting with only five students, the school is characterized by its philosophy of learning with the heart in closeness to nature without any superficial barriers between teachers and students, as opposed to the strict, repetitive and the rote learning system that was mainstream during Tagore's childhood. Often referred to as an ashram system, initially what started out as this school, later grew into what is now Visva-Bharati University. It is one of the two primary and secondary school affiliated with the Visva-Bharati University; the other being Siksha Satra.

== Extracurricular activities ==
Sahitya Sabhas are literary and musical evenings, usually taking place each Tuesday, in which students share their own literary works, dance, music and short skits among themselves and with the community. The school also presents plays during the annual Rabindra Saptaho, along with all other bodies of the Visva-Bharati University.

Sports are an important part of campus life. There are annual competitions in the areas of music, dance and recitation. Often, professionals in the field of sciences are invited to evenings of discussions of contemporary scientific and social issues, along with the students. There is also a yearly picnic (Barshik Bonobhojon), as well as excursions to parts of West Bengal, including Bardhaman, Malda, Purulia, Chittaranjan etc.

The school has a number of committees such as the Environment Committee ("Paribesh Bibhag"), Health Committee ("Swastho Bibhag"), Justice Committee ("Bichar bibhag"), Food Committee ("Ahar Bibhag"), Literary Committee ("Sahitya Bibhag") etc. that govern and make decisions on matters related to student body. Apart from all this the school has a number of publications. One such publication is the quarterly news-paper "Resonance", which is entirely planned and executed by the senior students of the school.

== Notable alumni ==
- Amartya Sen, Nobel Prize-winning economist
- Arnab, Bangladeshi musician
- Benode Behari Mukherjee, painter and muralist
- Gayatri Devi, Maharani of Jaipur
- Indira Gandhi, Late Prime Minister of India
- Kanika Bandyopadhyay, Rabindrasangeet musician
- Ramkinkar Baij, Sculptor, Fine Arts
- Shantideb Ghosh, Rabindrasangeet singer
- Sudhi Ranjan Das, ex-Chief Justice of India - one of the first 5 students of Rabindranath Tagore at Patha-Bhavana (Brhmacharyashram).
- Rathindranath Tagore, Founder-Vice Chancellor, Visva Bharati University, Santiniketan
- Pramathanath Bishi, author, educationist, and parliamentarian.
- Shivani, well known Hindi writer and Padma Shri award winner.
- Sujit Barman Roy, former Chief Justice of Orissa High Court

== See also ==
- Birbhum
- Education in India
- Education in West Bengal
