= Bangla (band) =

Bangladeshi folk-rock band

Bangla বাংলা
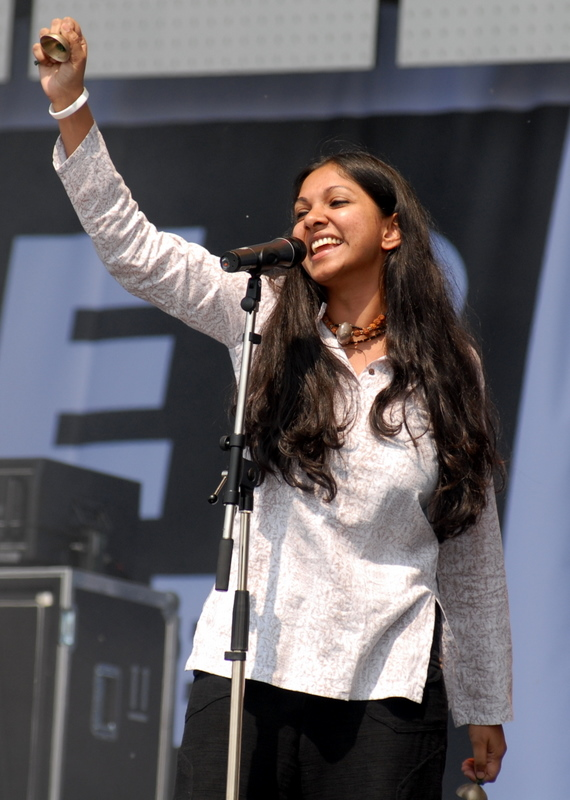
- Bangla performing in Rostock, Germany on 7 June 2007

Background information
- Origin: Dhaka, Bangladesh
- Genre: Folk-rock
- Occupation: Music
- Years active: 1999–present
- Label: Ektaar music
- Members: Anusheh Anadil; Arnob; Buno; Kaartik; Shantanu; Nazrul
- Website: www.bangla-theband.com

Bangla is a folk-rock band from Bangladesh formed by the popular indie musician Shayan Chowdhury Arnob in 1999. Bangla mainly blends the traditional Bangladeshi folk genres like Baul, Lalon together with western flavours like jazz, blues, rock etc. The band released its first album Kingkortobbobimurho in 2002. Over the years, the band has emerged as a prominent music group in the country and became one of the most sought after bands, especially among the urban youth listeners.

== Formation ==
The formation of the band dates back to the late '90s when Arnob was a student of Visva-Bharati University, Santiniketan. Due to his interest in music, he casually formed a band with his friends in Santineketan with the motive to spread Bengali folk songs. One day, Anusheh, who was a family friend of Arnob, came to visit Shantiniketan. Anusheh, who was well trained on Indian Classical Music, subsequently accepted the invitation of Arnob and became the lead vocalist. On their visit to Lalon's shrine in Kushtia, Arnob and Anusheh met Buno, a close friend of Anusheh and a bassist. The trio performed together at a public concert in Kolkata Book Fair in 1999. Their performance received good feedback from the audience. The same year, Arnob moved to Dhaka. The band was then joined by Kartik, former guitarist of Prachayanat. and Shantanu on drums. Thus they came to be known as the band "Bangla". A year later, Nazrul, also an acquaintance of Anusheh, joined as the Dhol player.

== Journey ==
Bangla first made its formal public appearance in October 1999, in the Nescafe show at the Dhaka Sheraton. Prothom Alo referred their performance as Jatra Arombho or the "Beginning of the Journey" of this band. Before that, the band also performed in Art and Music Fest at Drik Art Gallery, Dhaka. The band later performed in a concert at the Art Institute Dhaka in 2000.

In 2002, the band took part at The Benson and Hedges Star Search and Arnob eventually received the Award for Best Instrumentalist for his role as the Esraj player. The same year, Bangla released their debut album Kingkortobbobimurho under the label of Ektaar music, featuring several little-known folk songs. The album sold over a hundred thousand copies in the first two weeks of its release.

Bangla released their second album Protutponnomotitto in 2006 which was a tribute to Lalon. In 2007, the band performed in a series of concerts in Germany along with the likes of Bono Vox, Bob Geldof, Die Toten Hosen, Youssou N'Dour etc. Bangla was also the main attraction at the Dhaka leg of 2009 Fête de la Musique.
