= Ektaar Music =

Bangladeshi record label

Ektaar Music একতার মিউজিক
- Founded: 2002
- Founder: Feisal Siddiqi Bogey; Sheikh Monirul Alam Tipu
- Genre: Various
- Country of origin: Bangladesh
- Location: Dhaka
- Official website: ektaarmusic.com

Ektaar Music (Bengali: একতার মিউজিক; a reference to the Ektara instrument) is a Bangladeshi record label based in Dhaka. It was founded by Feisal Siddiqi Bogey, Sheikh Monirul Alam Tipu, and others in 2002. Ektaar was also known for its opposition to piracy. It was one of the largest record labels in Bangladesh, specializing in folk revival. Feisal Siddiqi Bogey is the CEO of the label.

== History ==
Ektaar was founded in 2002 as a goal to revive and popularize Bengali folk music in Bangladesh. It started off with selling CDs of albums by artists such as the band Bangla and singer Pothik Nobi, which were successful. Its success grew over time, and became one of the most prominent Bangladeshi music labels. Its songs also became popular among the Bangladeshi diaspora. Ektaar has also become a pioneer of giving royalty to Bangladeshi artists, and helped with the rise of musicians in the country. The label later announced its decision to fight piracy by signing an agreement with a popular music portal, amadergaan.com, which would have the exclusive rights to distribute songs produced under the Ektaar label via the internet. Sound Machine Ltd also signed an agreement with the label, with all the three companies having an aim to protect copyright and distribute Bangladeshi music throughout the world.

== Notable artists ==
- Ajob
- Bangla
- Habib Wahid
- Hyder Husyn
- Jatra
- Milon Mahmud
- Moon
- Renaissance
- Sandipan
- Shahana
- Shayan Chowdhury Arnob

== See also ==
- List of Bangladeshi record labels
