= Bangladeshi rock =

Rock music of Bangladesh

Bangladeshi rock music
- Stylistic origins: Rock and roll; pop rock; blues rock; hard rock; heavy metal; folk rock; alternative rock; progressive rock
- Cultural origins: Early 1960s in Chittagong, Dhaka
- Typical instruments: Vocals; electric guitar; bass guitar; drums; keyboards
- Derivative forms: Bangladeshi heavy metal

Bangladeshi rock music, or Bangla rock music, is a style of music in Bangladesh that is derived from British and American rock music, mixed with the Bengali classical and Adhunik musical styles from the 1960s. The genre was introduced in the 1960s by a few bands who began developing a distinctive rock sound. Bangladeshi rock is commonly divided into two categories: East Pakistan rock, and Bangladesh rock. From the 1970s to the 2000s, it was one of the nation's most popular musical genres.

From the mid-1970s to the late 1990s, Bangladeshi rock was heavily influential in the development of various fusion genres in South Asia like folk rock, pop rock, hard rock and heavy metal. Bangladeshi rock bands during this era developed a distinct sound, with the most popular bands commonly featuring keyboards. In the 2000s, several subgenres of Bangladeshi heavy metal music emerged, including thrash, death and progressive. From the 2000s to 2010s, additional rock genres developed, including art, psychedelic, post-grunge, progressive and alternative.

== Rock and roll (1960s to mid-1980s) ==
=== Origins ===
The foundations of Bangladeshi rock started in the 1950s as a fusion of American rock and roll and Bengali classical music. In the 1960s, the Gramophone Company of Pakistan imported many LPs and singles from rock and roll artists like Cliff Richard and the Shadows, Elvis Presley, the Beatles, the Rolling Stones, the Beach Boys and the Hollies, which sold very well in Bangladesh. These artists were favored mostly by high school and college students. Drawing influences from 1950s and 1960s rock and roll artists, Bangladeshi rock bands formed. Hence, mid-1960s Bangladeshi rock music was influenced by and developed a sound that was very similar in beat to the British Invasion and, in the late 1960s, to that of psychedelic rock.

There is much debate as to who was the first rock band in the country. Zinga, formed in 1963 in Chittagong, is an early contender, but their music resembled Adhunik more than rock and roll. The band introduced guitar, drums and piano, which made their music quite popular. It was also the first band to perform Tagore songs with guitar and piano on East Pakistan TV (now BTV). It has been argued by singer and journalist Elita Karim that Windy Side of Care was the first rock band of the country. Formed in 1964 in Dhaka, they started performing songs by Elvis and Cliff Richard in clubs and hotels. They were also the first band to advertise themselves as performing psychedelic rock. Their self-titled debut album also featured the raga rock song "Raag Bageshri". In 1968, Zinga released their first song "Tomari Jiboney" which became very popular as it was aired on Shadhin Bangla Betar and East Pakistan TV. From the late 1960s, inspired by the Beatles, Zinga became interested in the singer-songwriter concept. Another band, formed by American students living in Dhaka called Insex Dui, was an American-Bangladeshi band that performed American and British psychedelic rock music in the 1960s.

Before becoming a successful Dhallywood actor, Zafar Iqbal was a singer in the band The Rambling Stones, formed in 1966. Other popular rock bands of the 1960s included Ugly Phases, Fire in Ice and Time Ago Motion. None of these bands released any albums.

=== The Concert for Bangladesh ===
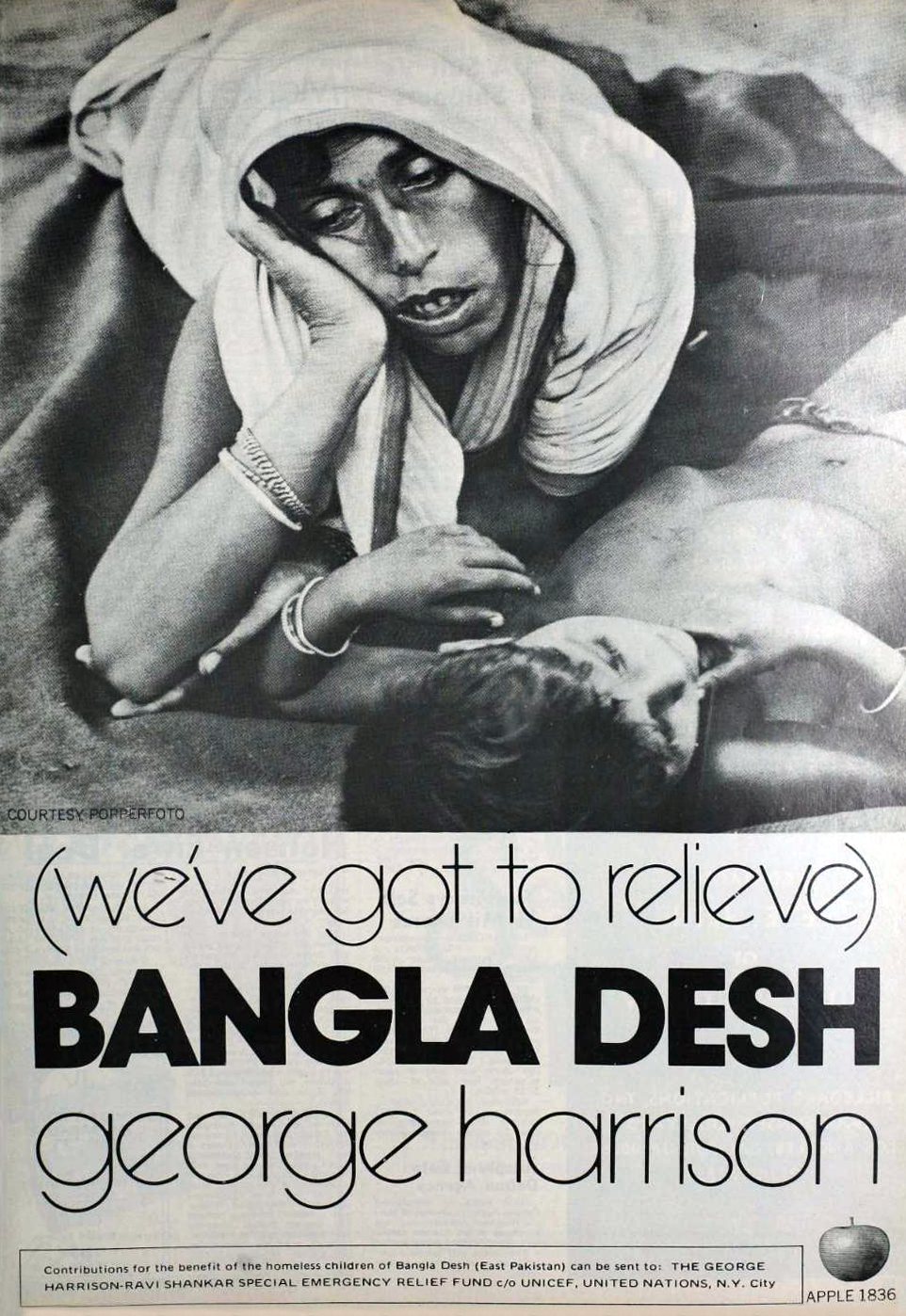
Trade ad for Harrison's "Bangla Desh" single, August 1971

As East Pakistan struggled to become the separate state of Bangladesh during the 1971 Bangladesh Liberation War, the political and military turmoil and associated atrocities led to a massive refugee problem, with at least seven million displaced people moving to neighbouring India. Bengali musician Ravi Shankar first brought the issue to the attention of his friend George Harrison in the early months of 1971.

Concerts for relief efforts were held at 2:30 pm and 8:00 pm on Sunday, 1 August 1971 in Madison Square Garden. They featured a supergroup of performers that included Harrison, fellow former Beatle Ringo Starr, Bob Dylan, Eric Clapton, Billy Preston, Leon Russell and the band Badfinger. In addition, Shankar and Ali Akbar Khan performed an opening set of Indian classical music. The concerts were attended by a total of 40,000 people, and the initial gate receipts raised about US$250,000 for Bangladeshi relief, which was administered by UNICEF. After gathering the musicians, Harrison found it extremely difficult to get the recording industry to release the rights for performers to share the stage, and millions of dollars raised from the album and film were tied up in IRS tax escrow accounts for years. The Concert for Bangladesh is considered to be a highly successful and influential humanitarian aid project, generating both awareness and considerable funds, as well as providing valuable lessons and inspiration for projects that followed, such as Live Aid.

The Concert for Bangladesh was the first-ever benefit concert in history. The concerts were followed by a bestselling live album, a boxed three-record set, and a concert documentary by Apple Films, which debuted in 1972. The live album topped the music charts in many countries and went on to win the Grammy Award for Album of the Year in 1973. The album had a big impact on early Bangladeshi rock music in the mid-1970s, especially on Azam Khan.

=== Post-independence ===
Most of the Bangladeshi rock bands from the 1960s did not become successful and disbanded after the war in 1971. Some musicians went abroad or formed new bands.

One of the first bands of independent Bangladesh was Underground Peace Lovers (UPL), formed in 1972 in Dhaka. Uccharon were the biggest band of that era in South Asia. Inspired by 1960s rock music and some Hindustani classical music, their frontman Azam Khan introduced hippie fashion to the scene. Khan was also a freedom fighter and renowned protest singer during the war, and inspired soldiers during training with his songs. His first song, "Hai Allah Re!" became a hit in 1973. "Bangladesh", a song released by his band in 1975, was a protest song and inspired many bands to write songs about the struggle of the poor. They had more hit songs later in the decade including "Ami Jare Chaire" (1975), "Ashi Ashi Bole Tumi" (1977) and "Papri Keno Bojhena" (1978).

On the other hand, Spondan, led by singer-songwriter Nasir Ahmed Apu, mostly performed traditional folk songs. They became one of the most popular Bangladeshi rock bands of the 1970s, and their 1975 debut album Spondan Bangladesh was the best-selling album of the decade. Uccharon's protest songs inspired many bands of the 1980s and 1990s to write songs against the autocratic government.

=== Pop rock ===
Souls were the most successful pop rock band of the 1970s. From L-R: Sazedul Alam (bass guitar), Subrata Barua Ronny (drums), Tapan Chowdhury (lead vocals), Shahedul Alam (electric guitar) and Naquib Khan (keyboards and vocals).

In mid-1970s Bangladesh, more bands were formed, mostly in Chittagong and Dhaka. There were twenty to thirty bands in the two cities playing in clubs, hotels and halls. Most of them were influenced by the British Invasion, Adhunik music and the early rock and roll scene in Bangladesh.

With songs like "Abar Elo Je Shondha" (1972), "Ke Bashi Bajai Re" (1974), and "Neel Neel Shari Porey" (1978), the brothers Lucky and Happy Akhand became very popular throughout the country. Happy Akhand taught, produced, and promoted other artists, including Ferdous Wahid, Kumar Bishwajit, Ayub Bachchu and James. Pop rock music was also led by the Chittagong-based band Souls. After their first single "Mon Shudhu Mon Chuyeche" in 1980, the band was appreciated by older rock bands. They released their debut album Super Souls two years later, which made them one of the most popular bands in the country. The band Miles released a self titled debut album in 1982, which was the first all- English album in the country. It only featured two original songs by the band.

Most 1970s bands disbanded because of their vocalists' prominence. In the 1980s however, bands stayed together and continued to release hit singles and albums into the 1990s.

More subgenres emerged, such as psychedelic rock and hard rock. Nova was successful in the 1980s as a psychedelic rock band.

== Development (late 1980s to mid 1990s) ==
=== Pop and hard rock ===
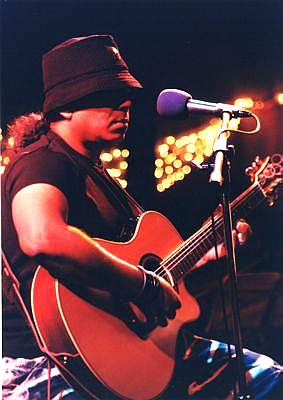
Ayub Bachchu from Love Runs Blind, on stage in 2008

Bands from the 1980s continued their success along with new bands of the 1990s. In the 1960s to 1980s, many rock bands were formed in Chittagong, but often went to Dhaka in the 1990s for better studio services and success. The 1990s are sometimes considered the most productive decade in Bangladeshi music history. Rock music became the most popular genre in the country. During the 1990s, it was common to divide mainstream rock into pop and hard rock. Pop rock became more popular than in previous decades as bands like Souls and Feedback, whose frontman Maqsoodul Haque established the Bangladesh Musical Bands Association (BAMBA) in 1987, began. BAMBA was formed to arrange a three-day charity concert at the Sheraton Hotel in Dhaka. The aim was to raise funds to help victims of the devastating flood in Bangladesh that year. Around ৳250,000 was raised, all of which was donated for the rehabilitation of flood victims. BAMBA organized many successful concerts throughout the 1990s that helped many bands with their careers. New successful acts included Ark, Different Touch and Winning. Ark released a string of hit singles, including "Sweety", "Ekaki" and "Jare Ja". Along with Ark, pop rock remained the most popular rock genre of the decade, even after two decades in the country. The decline of the genre was mainly due to bands adopting more of a pop sound influenced by Michael Jackson. Many bands also disbanded due to reduced success and personal problems between band members.

In contrast, hard rock was more influenced by 1960s psychedelic rock, blues rock and 1970s Bangladeshi rock artists. The most successful and influential psychedelic rock band of the time was Nova.

The most successful blues rock band was Love Runs Blind, which went on to release several bestselling albums. Some earlier bands also became interested in the genre as its popularity grew. Feedback and Souls had some hard rock songs in their albums from 1993 to 1996.

Soft rock found its way to Bangladesh during the mid-1990s, influenced by 1980s American music of the genre. It was not very popular at first, but was successful between 1998 and 1999. Paper Rhyme released its self-titled debut album in 1996 and was praised by many contemporary musicians because of their decade-defining song "Ondhokar Ghore", which is one of the most-covered songs in Bangladesh. After Paper Rhyme disbanded in the early 2000s the genre's popularity dropped.

=== Heavy metal ===
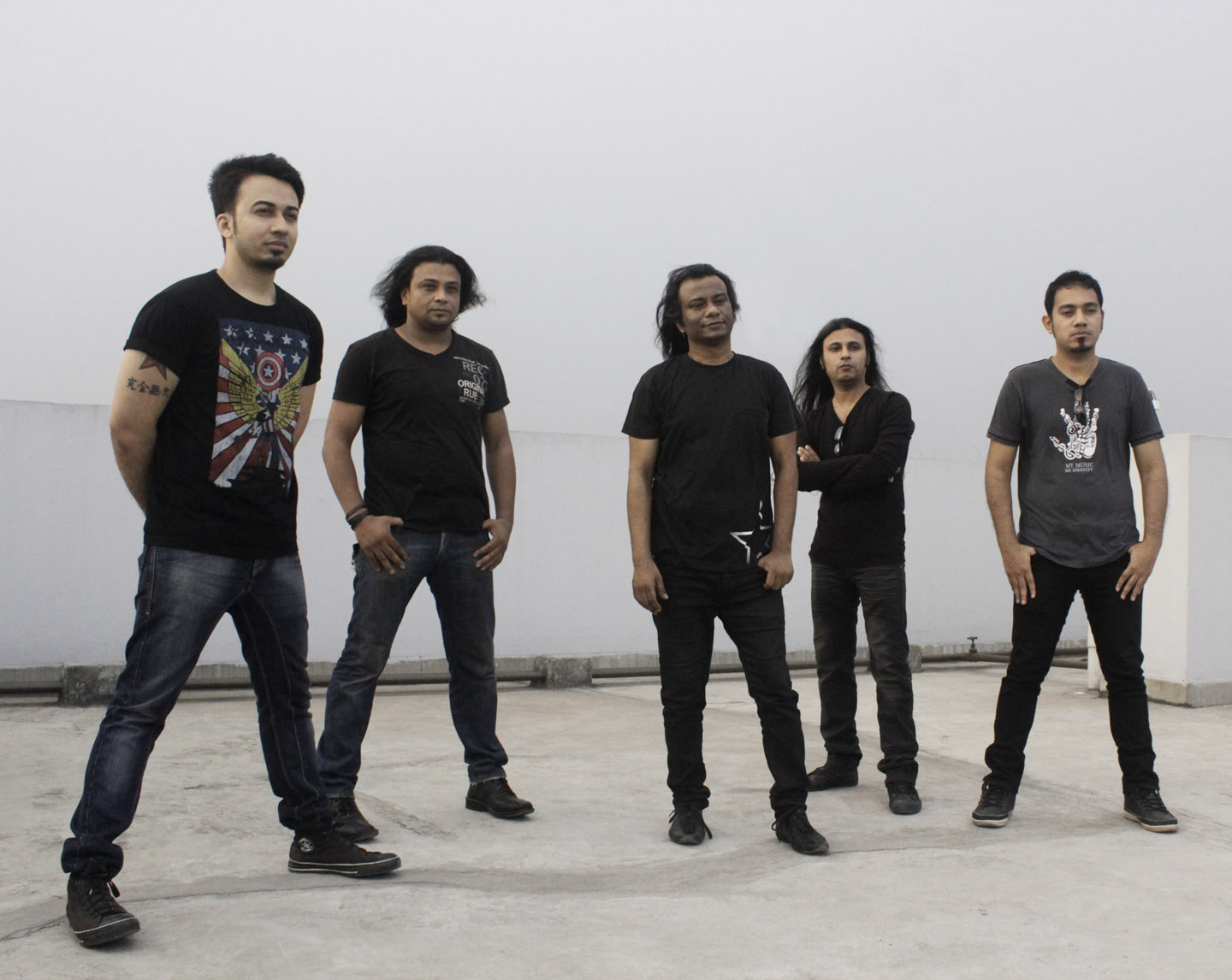
Warfaze is considered to be one of the most influential heavy metal bands in Bangladesh

With roots in blues rock, psychedelic rock and the British heavy metal bands of the 1970s, heavy metal was introduced in Bangladesh in the mid-1980s by several bands formed by high school and college students. The bands that played heavy metal developed a sound characterized by overt rhythmic basslines, highly amplified distortion, extended guitar solos, emphatic beats, and overall loudness.

Bangladeshi heavy metal songwriters, inspired by the lyrics of Azam Khan, wrote anti-establishment songs against the autocratic government and about people's rights. The four pioneering metal bands in Bangladesh were Rockstrata, Warfaze, In Dhaka, and Aces. The first band to perform heavy metal songs in Bangladesh was Waves. Their 1992 mixed album Hooray mostly contained heavy metal songs and was called "the most important thing that Bangladeshi heavy metal needed", by many heavy metal musicians of the next decade. Throughout the 1990s, heavy metal was criticized for its loudness and protest lyrics. Warfaze was the leader of the decade's heavy metal scene. With their popularity, they helped the rise of heavy metal bands in the 2000s. Many subgenres emerged in the country in the 2000s and 2010s, such as thrash metal, progressive metal and death metal. Cryptic Fate was also part of the 1990s heavy metal scene, and in 1994 they released the country's first all-English metal album, Ends are Forever. Their sound often resembled the British heavy metal band Iron Maiden.

Though it was a significant subgenre of rock, many heavy metal bands were not as popular as Warfaze, and most disbanded in the same decade. The genre reached peak commercial popularity in 1997–1998, before many acts moved off in a variety of directions, including Warfaze and Cryptic Fate, who began to develop neoclassical metal and thrash metal respectively.

== New subgenres and Chharpotro (late 1990s to mid 2000s) ==
=== Folk rock ===
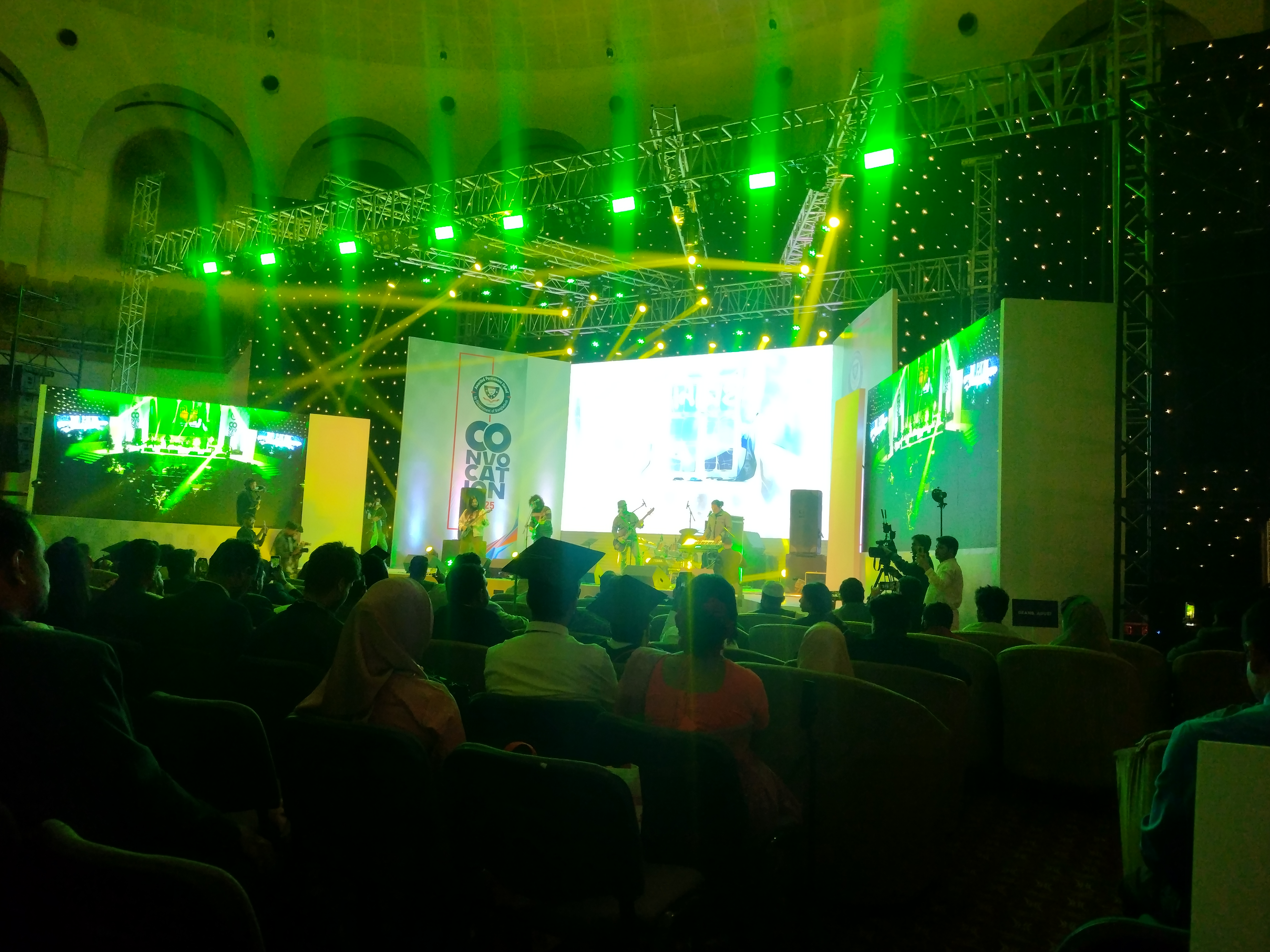
Shironamhin performing at the ADUST convocation, 2025

Some Bangladeshi rock bands wanted to show their respect for the country's classical and folk music to classical music lovers, musicians, and critics. Following Azam Khan and the bands Windy Side of Care and Spondon, Dalchhut included folk rock on their first three albums, Ah (1997), Hridoypur (2000) and Akashchuri (2002). Aurthohin formed mainly as a heavy metal band but also composed folk rock hits like "Adbhut Shei Cheleti" and "Amar Protichhobi". Frontman Saidus Salehin Sumon also composed folk rock songs as a solo artist. His debut solo album Sumon O Aurthohin was one of the first folk rock albums in the country. Aurthohin's first few records are also considered to be some of the first pure folk rock records in Bangladesh, as they used rock instruments in their songs.

Folk rock music gradually changed in the mid-2000s, when Bangla started composing Lalon songs as a band. Lalon-inspired folk rock first appeared on their debut album Kingkortobbobimurho in 2002. Their attitude toward conservative Bangladeshis impacted the band members, and along with many bands of the era they were protesting against conservative religious leaders and politicians. Many bands started covering Lalon songs, as they connected with his philosophy on a spiritual level. Lalon Band and Arnob are some successful artists who performed Lalon songs. Renowned rock musician Ayub Bachchu was inspired to make folk songs by these bands and released Vatir Gane Matir Tane (2006), an Abdul Alim cover album. The genre later influenced successful bands like Chirkutt and Shironamhin, who experimented with many rock genres, mainly classical, rock and folk.

Disagreement over what the best decade for Bangladeshi rock was led to a feud between musicians Sumon and Bachchu. In the early 2000s after Aurthohin's first release, Bachchu said they are "a good band, but their music has no role behind the development of the country's music industry". Bachchu also warned people that AmaderGaan.com, which he claimed was run by Sumon, was spreading information online that he felt was bad for the music industry. He made the comment after learning that Sumon had alleged that he never promotes newcomers nor gives them space in the music industry.

=== Alternative music ===
Throughout the 1990s, American and British alternative bands influenced several young bands in Bangladesh, especially late 1990s and early 2000s alternative rock. Alternative bands combined elements of hardcore punk and heavy metal, and made heavy use of guitar distortion, fuzz, and feedback. The lyrics were typically apathetic and angst-filled, and often about political hypocrisy, identity crisis and Bangladeshi war criminals.

Around 1998, Wire, Kopropholia, Clover Minds, and the Spanking Monkeys began playing alternative rock in Dhaka. However, they were not very successful at the time.

=== Grunge ===
Around the same time, the band Black contributed to alternative rock and introduced grunge to the country. It emerged in the early 2000s with members including Jon Kabir and Tahsan Rahman Khan. Their songs were not focused on guitar solos but had powerful and heavy guitar riffs and chord progressions, and slow and light verses with heavy choruses in the grunge style. The band gained success shortly after with their debut album Amar Prithibi and their second album Utshober Por. In 2005, a road accident resulted in the death of their sound engineer and mentor which led to some key members leaving, eventually including the lead vocalist Kabir who left in 2011. As of 2014, the band has two of its original members and still makes music.

Chharpotro

Chharpotro is one of the most important band mixed albums released in 2001. It was a huge milestone for the country's band industry. The main idea was to promote newer/underground bands to people. Bands like Artcell and Black started their journey and debuted with their first songs through this album. Bands like Metal Maze and Cryptic Fate also gained popularity after the albums release.

=== Experimental ===
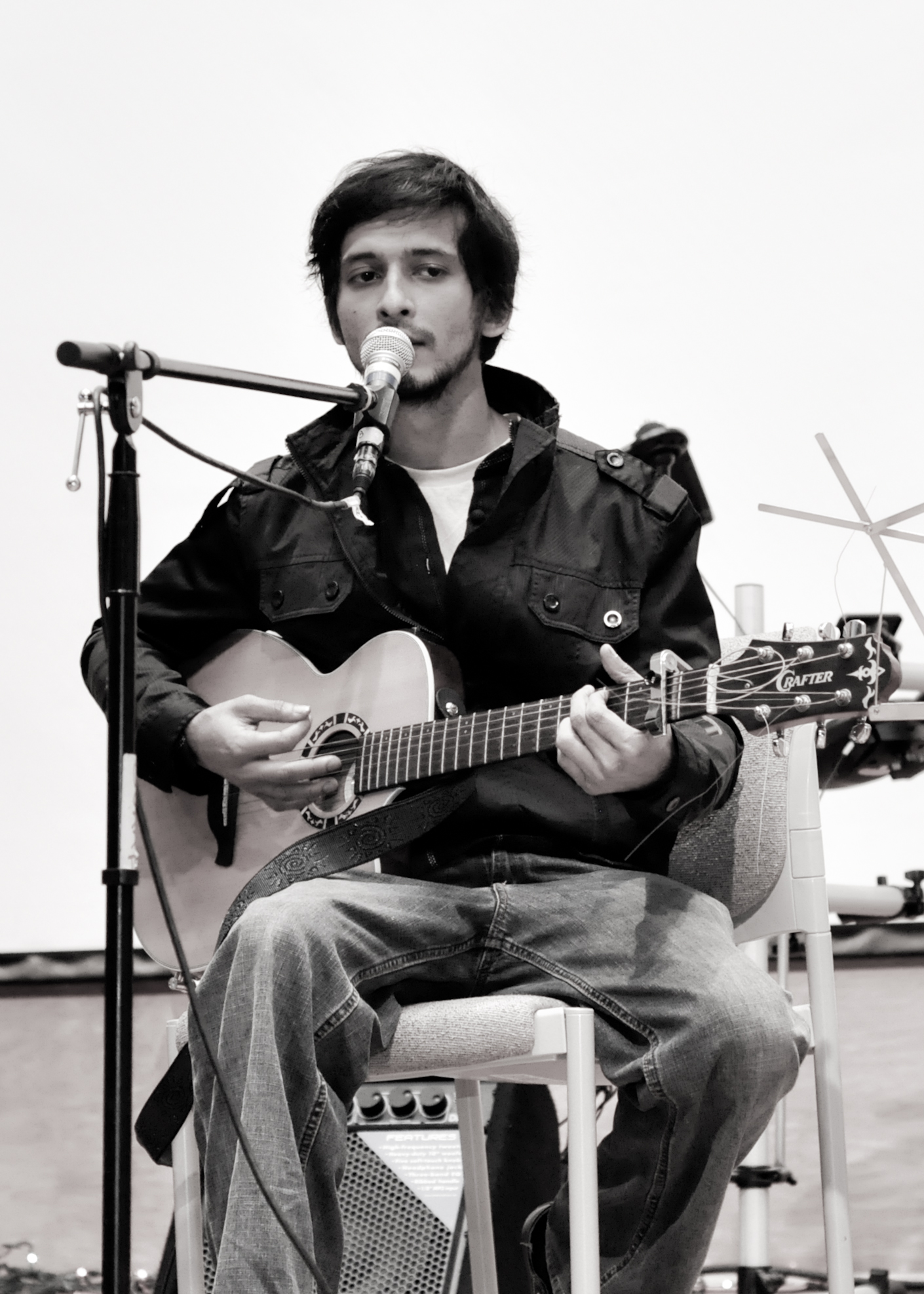
Arnob pictured in 2012, while performing in Dallas, Texas

Experimental rock in Bangladesh involves the mixture of rock with traditional music of different cultures. Experimental bands in the country sometimes use multiple instruments of different cultures like the sitar, esraj, khol, ghatam, and flute. Rock artists Arnob and Shironamhin released Rabindra Sangeet albums. Shironamhin released Shironamhin Rabindranath in 2010 and Arnob released Adheko Ghume in 2012.

== New millennium (late 2000s to mid 2010s) ==
=== Blues rock ===
Ayub Bachchu started his project AB Blues Club around 2007. He said, "A number of our songs are in blues scale, but we usually perform them in a more rock flavor". A Jazz and Blues Festival was held in Dhaka in 2015 and 2017, where musicians from Bangladesh, the UK, and the US performed.

=== Progressive and experimental metal ===
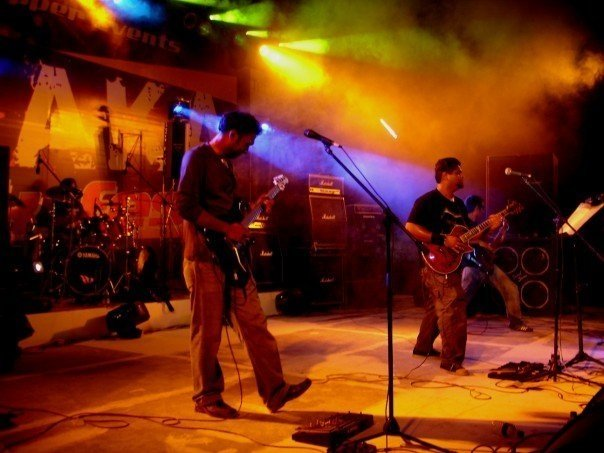
Artcell was the most significant and most popular band from the progressive metal genre

In the mid-2000s folk and alternative rock scene, a few progressive metal bands formed and performed at club shows in Dhaka. The bands were inspired by 1990s heavy metal and 2000s experimental rock. They developed their music out of those two genres; playing heavier riffs, faster basslines and double bass drumming. Their lyrics typically highlighted anger about social injustice and hypocrisy as well as philosophical songs with softer tones.

Artcell was the band leading the genre and was partially responsible for popularizing it. Their first two studio albums, Onno Shomoy (2002) and Oniket Prantor (2006) had a big influence on the country's heavy metal scene in the 2010s. The themes that Artcell used in their songwriting have impacted and changed music. The alternative metal band Vibe also had a few progressive metal songs in their 2007 album Chena Jogot. By the end of the decade, Artcell stopped releasing albums, which caused the decline of progressive metal and an increase in the popularity of symphonic and experimental metal, both of which are derived from the former. Symphonic and experimental metal of the 2010s was similar to progressive metal, but with more orchestration and keyboards. Successful bands from the genre included De-illumination, Warfaze's late 2000s and early 2010s work, Sazzad Arefeen's Angry Machine, Hallucination and Ionic Bond, with the latter two mainly being melodic death metal bands. Hallucination released their debut full-length album Krittim Prithibi in 2013, which was the first Bengali melodic death metal album in Bangladesh. It was also the first album in the country which could be purchased via the bKash payment system. Later on, this album was also released internationally by Satanic Productions. Later on, Ionic Bond released their debut album Amavashya Lore, which was widely appreciated by Bangladeshi audiences despite being in English. While rock music was still popular throughout the country, a budding indie scene started to flourish in smaller concert arenas. Bands like The Crowd, Picket, Embers in Snow, Alfred, Headline, and Attic brought about a change in the sound of rock with English songwriting being a common practice in their music. They strayed away from their hard rock and metal predecessors and ventured into newer and independent music territory. During the early 2010s, the Bangladesh Musical Bands Association (BAMBA) and the Chittagong Musical Bands Association (CMBA) began organizing rock concerts in Chittagong, which brought exposure to local underground bands. This resulted in the emergence of new rock bands in the city, such as Hemorrhage and Blunderware.

Many Bangladeshi progressive metal and experimental metal bands have changed popular rock music. Bands like Karnival and Owned have especially progressed the industry. Karnival released three successful albums, and Owned has published two. Bands such as Messianic Era, Ossrik, Seventh Sign, Jogot, and Attic are also notable. By the end of the decade, there was a resurgence of hard and alternative rock in the country, with bands like Unmaad, the Conclusion, Adverb, and The Perfect Criminals releasing albums.

=== Possible decline ===
Many critics and musicians have claimed that rock music declined in popularity in Bangladesh during the 2010s. It has partially lost ground to Bollywood music from neighboring India, which dominates Bangladeshi radio, and pirated versions are available online for free. Bollywood music also influenced the music of Dhallywood, which saw the rise of pop singers like Arfin Rumey, Hridoy Khan, Imran Mahmudul and Armaan Alif. Meanwhile, as of the late 2010s underground hip-hop music has largely replaced rock as the most popular genre among the young. Domestic law has also failed to protect the financial interests of the artists who once led the country's rock music industry. The record industry says that just 10 percent of music in Bangladesh is purchased legally and estimate that music piracy annually costs US$180 million in lost earnings. Increased religiosity, which rejects all things Western in favor of a traditional lifestyle, has also made rock less popular. Some Muslims in the country consider rock music a sin. Solo concerts have become less popular, as events like Joy Bangla Concert and RockNation have become popular and sold thousands of tickets. Though losing popularity throughout the 2010s, some rock bands, such as Love Runs Blind, Nagar Baul, Warfaze, Aurthohin, Artcell, Shironamhin and Chirkutt still remain highly popular.

=== Extreme metal ===
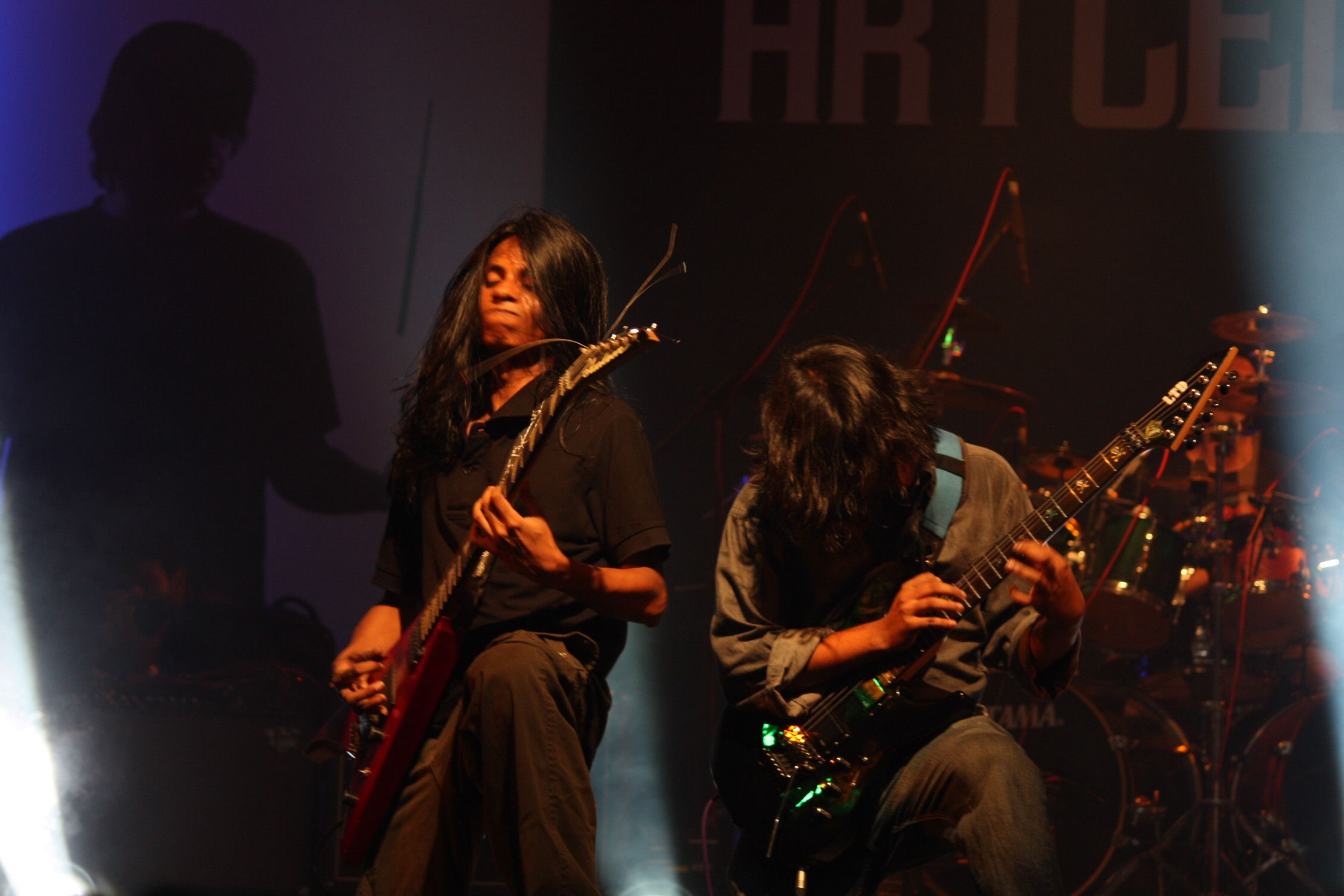
Powersurge was the leader of the East Bengal extreme metal scene. Pictured in 2008, Saimum Hasan Nahian (left) and Samir Hafiz (right) at a concert.

Extreme metal is mainly an underground genre, which became commercially successful in Bangladesh in the late 2000s, when Powersurge and Mechanix took part in D-Rockstar 2008. In that competition, Powersurge finished in first place and Mechanix in second. They were the most significant bands of the genre in the country, and they introduced thrash and groove metal to a wider audience. Severe Dementia introduced death metal a few years before them. Death metal vocals are usually delivered as guttural death growls or high-pitched screaming, complemented by downtuned, highly distorted guitars and extremely fast double bass percussion. The genre's bands had no intention of commercial success, as they were all fans of underground extreme metal of the 1980s. These three bands are considered to be the pioneers of Bangladeshi extreme metal, introducing a different style and sound to rock. They were also criticized for the horrific images on their album covers. Other significant extreme metal bands of the decade include Hallucination, Minerva, Dissector, Thrash, Trainwreck and Nafaarmaan. In 2018, Powersurge guitarist Saimum Hasan Nahian urged the organizers of Wacken Open Air to hold a concert in Bangladesh. The Wacken Metal Battle concert was held in the Russian Cultural Center in Dhaka. Five bands, Karma, Ionic Bond, Torture Goregrinder, Infidel and Trainwreck took part in the competition, with the latter being declared the winner. They also performed at Bangalore Open Air, where they competed against other metal bands from Sri Lanka, Nepal and India. They won entry into Wacken Open Air, the first Bangladeshi band to do so.

== See also ==
- Bangladeshi heavy metal

== Notes ==
=== Sources ===
- Siraj, Sadia; Allam, Maruf (2017). The Problem of Copyright Compliance in the Music Industry of Bangladesh: An analysis (PDF).
- Peter Lavezzoli, The Dawn of Indian Music in the West, Continuum (New York, 2006; ISBN 0-8264-2819-3).
- Nicholas Schaffner, The Beatles Forever, McGraw-Hill (New York, 1978; ISBN 0-07-055087-5).
- Simon Leng, While My Guitar Gently Weeps: The Music of George Harrison, Hal Leonard (Milwaukee, WI, 2006; ISBN 1-4234-0609-5).
- The Editors of Rolling Stone, Harrison, Rolling Stone Press/Simon & Schuster (New York, 2002; ISBN 0-7432-3581-9).
- Robert Rodriguez, Fab Four FAQ 2.0: The Beatles' Solo Years, 1970–1980, Backbeat Books (Milwaukee, WI, 2010; ISBN 978-1-4165-9093-4).
