= Epitaph of Plassey =

2007 EP by Bangladeshi metal band Severe Dementia

EP by Severe Dementia
- Released: April 8, 2007
- Recorded: 27 February–12 March 2007
- Studio: Sound Garden Studio; Rock Relic Studio
- Genre: Technical death metal
- Length: 25:15
- Label: Demonstealer Records
- Producer: Saimum Hasan Nahian

Epitaph of Plassey is the debut EP by Bangladeshi metal band Severe Dementia. It was released on April 8, 2007, by Demonstealer Records. It is considered to be the first death metal record in Bangladesh. It was highly influential in the "East Bengal Extreme Metal" scene.

== Overview ==
The drum tracks of the EP was recorded in Sound Garden Studio while the vocals, guitars and bass were recorded in Rock Relic Studio. It was released by Demonstealer Records in India. The sound was engineered by Saimum Hassan Nahian and Raef al Hasan Rafa. Artworks and digital illustration was done by Dhanad Islam.

== Track listing ==
All the tracks written by Severe Dementia.

No.	Title	Length
1.	"Entombment of the Traitor"	2:38
2.	"Credence of Fort William"	5:07
3.	"The Bengal Regiment"	5:58
4.	"Howls of Murshidabad"	5:40
5.	"Strangled by Treason and Forgery"	5:52
Total length:		25:15

== Personnel ==
- Ahmed Shawki - lead vocals
- "Schizo" Saimum Hassan Nahian - guitars
- Arefin Ahmed Sazeed - bass
- "Rhino" Raef al Hasan Rafa - drums
