= LiveSquare Entertainment =

Entertainment company originating from Bangladesh

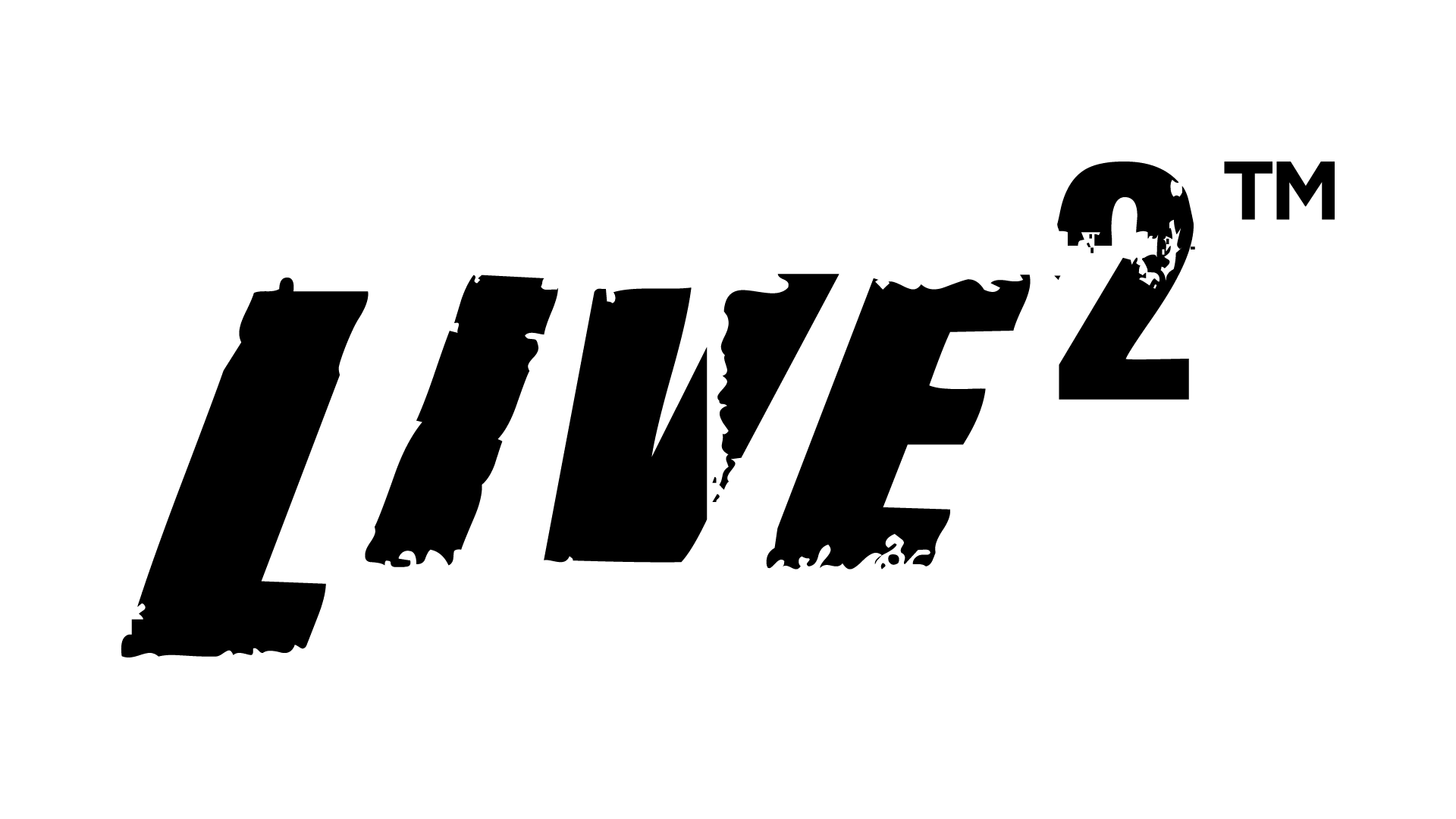
- Company type: Private
- Industry: Entertainment
- Founded: 2007; 19 years ago
- Headquarters: Dhaka, Bangladesh
- Area served: Bangladesh
- Products: RockNation; The Wireless Sessions; Meets; Bangladesh Music Week; Thrillectronica; The ABC Generation
- Number of employees: Full-time: 6 Part-time: 100+
- Website: thelivesquare.com

LiveSquare Entertainment is an entertainment company originating from Bangladesh, founded in 2007 by entrepreneur Nafis Ahmed. Its services include festival management, artist management, global bookings and tour management, and production and sale of party lifestyle merchandise and original art creations LiveSquare has organized many festivals featuring local and international artists, and for the deployment of high-profile Bangladeshi artists such as Shironamhin, Chirkutt and Band Lalon to international festivals in Sri Lanka and Norway.

LiveSquare has worked with international cultural entities such as Rikskonsertene: Concerts Norway, Goethe Institute Dhaka and EMK Center, as well as with diplomatic missions such as the Norwegian Embassy and the Embassy of Switzerland in Bangladesh.

== History ==
=== 2007-2010 ===
Initially started by Nafis Ahmed while he was a student in his sophomore year at IBA-DU, LiveSquare became known with a series of lounge concerts under the banner of The Wireless Sessions featuring bands such as Arbovirus, Shunno, Artcell, Cryptic Fate and Nemesis, in a time when the lounge music scene in Dhaka was in its infancy. LiveSquare also organized and executed several one-off concerts during this time, including a fundraising concert for the victims of the hurricane Cyclone Sidr. LiveSquare went on a year-long hiatus in 2010 following Ahmed's graduation and subsequent employment at a reputed marketing agency.

=== 2011-2012 ===
LiveSquare organized several new events in 2011, such as the tribute concert Titans: Iron Maiden and The ABC Generation series. LiveSquare worked with international entities to bring in international artists to Bangladesh, such as Norwegian-Bangladeshi musician Kohinoor Nordberg, Swiss funk rock band Starch, American guitarist Ken Stringfellow, Norwegian pop rock outfit Casa Murilo, multinational world music ensemble OK World and various others, performing alongside Bangladeshi artists. The Wireless Sessions were also brought back during this time.

=== 2013-2016 ===
LiveSquare sent Bangladeshi artists such as Chirkutt, Shironamhin and Band Lalon to perform at international festivals in Sri Lanka and Norway. In 2013, LiveSquare started the RockNation series of Rock/Metal concerts, starring artists such as Warfaze, Aurthohin, Artcell and Arbovirus.

In late 2015, LiveSquare organized and hosted the music conference Bangladesh Music Week 2015. The conference featured more than 20 foreign delegates alongside more than two dozen representatives of the Bangladeshi music scene. The event also included a live performance showcase featuring local and foreign musicians and dancers, along with an engineering masterclass for live lighting.

In February 2016, LiveSquare organized the first show of a new series of concerts called Pop Republic, starring Grammy and Brit Award-winning blue-eyed soul artist Joss Stone.

== Notable festivals ==
1. RockNation
2. Pop Republic
3. The Wireless Sessions
4. RockCity
5. RockTown
6. Bangladesh Music Week
7. Closeup Volt
8. The ABC Generation
9. Thrillectronica
10. Titans: Iron Maiden
11. LiveWire
12. RedSquare
13. SoundCity '13
14. Alice In Wonderland
15. Greenitiative
16. RockStrata: One Last Live
