= RockNation =

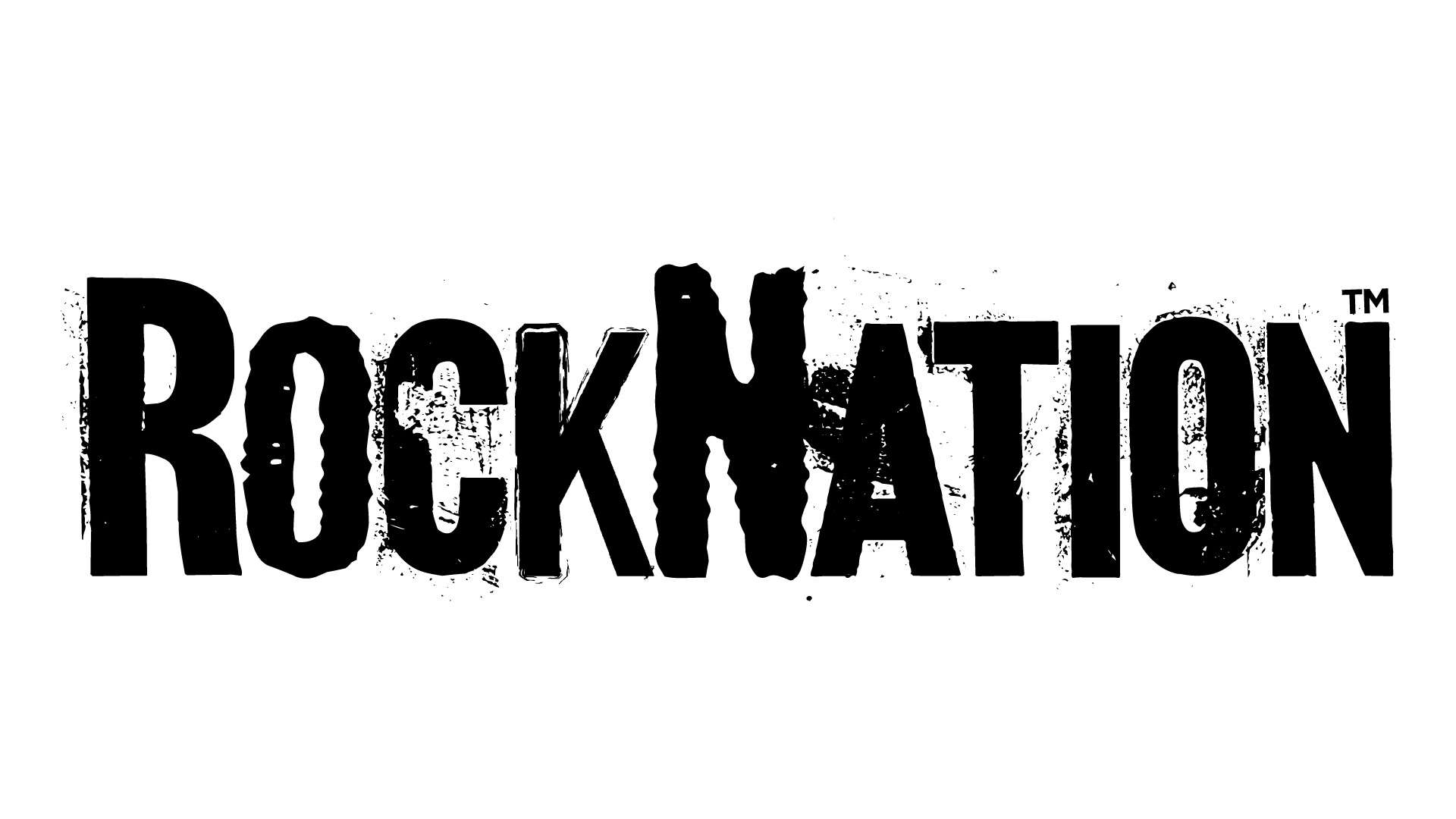
- Genre: Rock, metal
- Locations: Winter Garden, Hotel Ruposhi Bangla, Dhaka; International Convention City Bashundhara, Dhaka
- Years active: 2013–present
- Founders: LiveSquare Entertainment
- Website: rocknationfest.com

RockNation is a series of rock and metal festivals organized in Bangladesh, regularly starring eminent rock and metal bands of the nation. The first RockNation event was held on at Winter Garden, Hotel Ruposhi Bangla, Dhaka on April 12, 2013. Six more RockNation events have taken place since then, including one in Sylhet.

== History ==
=== 2013 ===
The first RockNation concert was held on April 12, 2013, and it starred the talents of Warfaze, Cryptic Fate, Arbovirus, Nemesis, Shunno, Band Lalon, Chirkutt and Jon. RockNation II took place on September 20, 2013, with the addition of rock band Indalo and thrash metal act Powersurge as new additions to its lineup. RockNation III added metal bands Aurthohin, Karnival, Mechanix and Minerva to the lineup, taking place on December 6, 2013, and featured a centrally positioned stage.

=== 2014 ===
The fourth episode of RockNation, titled RockNation: Overload, took place on April 19, 2014, marking the addition of Bangladesh's most famous progressive metal band Artcell and alternative rock band Black to the lineup of RockNation. RockNation: The Revolution of Rock, was the last chapter of RockNation to take place at Winter Garden, and featured a radically different lineup, featuring newer rock and metal bands like AvoidRafa, Echoes and Owned. Smaller-scale concerts featuring fewer bands also took place at various Dhaka venues under the RockTown and RockCity banners over the course of this year as preludes to the main RockNation events.

Cryptic Fate performing 'Bhoboghure' at RockNation III

=== 2015 ===
The sixth chapter of RockNation, RockNation: Resurrection, took place on April 3, 2015 at the International Convention City Bashundhara, Dhaka, and heralded the return of Bangladeshi hard rock band Vikings after a decade-long hiatus, alongside the other regular performers of RockNation.

=== 2016 ===
2016 marked the beginning of the RockNation Tours program, the first episode of which was held on February 5, 2016 at the open-air D Building Ground of the Shahjalal University of Science and Technology in Sylhet, featuring Warfaze, Artcell, Vikings, AvoidRafa and Powersurge from Dhaka, with the lineup further augmented by the addition of Sylhet's own metal bands Nongar, Psychotron and Rim.

== Art and stylistic direction ==
RockNation is well-known for its innovative stage designs and signature fire-based art direction, which is prevalent in all of their visual and printed communications, ranging from its posters to the original introductory and showtime animations which are displayed at the venues over the course of the show. The series is also noted for their whimsically shaped tickets, which have ranged from simple two-dimensional polygons to a three-dimensional cube.
