= Otritio =

2023 album by Artcell

অতৃতীয়

Studio album by Artcell
- Released: February 23, 2023
- Studio: Dhaka, Bangladesh
- Genre: Progressive metal; Progressive rock
- Length: 40:55
- Label: G Series
- Producer: Iqbal Asif Jewel

Artcell chronology
| অনিকেত প্রান্তর (No Man's Land) (2006) | অতৃতীয় (2023) |

Otritio (Bengali: অতৃতীয়; transl. "Not Third") is the third album by the Bangladeshi metal band Artcell, released in 2023. After a hiatus of 17 years, this is their next album release (despite the album being titled Not Third).

Artcell's first solo album Onno Shomoy was released in 2002 and was followed by his second solo album Aniket Prantor in 2006, which sold record numbers. The members of Artcell then revealed plans for a third album in 2012, but after nearly two decades of waiting for the band's third album, fans treated it like a meme and refused to believe it until it was released. Meanwhile, the band's bassist Cezanne and drummer Shaju, moved to Sydney. For the next few years, vocal and rhythm guitarist Lincoln and lead guitarist Ershad, had to carry the band with their students as guest members. Then in 2016 Artcell announced the re-release of the album. Ershad confirmed the release of the album saying, "Finally we are going to release a new album for our listeners. The album is titled 'Otritio'." On launching the third album after a long decade, he talked about the band members' busyness with family and personal work. But the album was not released in Sebar either. In 2017, lead guitarist Ershad Zaman was removed from the band, their reason being that he was inactive within the band and out of touch with the members. One of Lincoln's students took his place as a guest musician until Lincoln invited Kazi Faisal Ahmed, formerly of Metal Maze, as the lead guitarist in 2018.

Artcell announced the release of the album in early 2023. The album finally went on sale for a limited time on 23 February 2023 and was released on G-Series on 9 March 2023. The release of the album ended the wait after 17 years and created a remarkable response among fans.

== Lyrics ==
Other songs of the album - Baksho Bondi, Smritir Ayna, and Oshomapto Shantona - were written by Saef Al Nazi Cezanne. Biprotip and other songs are written by Saef Al Nazi Cezanne as well as Ishtiaq Islam Khan.

== Track listing ==
| No. | Title | Length |
|---|---|---|
| 1. | "প্রতীতি" (Protiti) | 1:57 |
| 2. | "বাক্স বন্দি" (Baksho bondi) | 6:57 |
| 3. | "বিপ্রতীপ" (Bipratip) | 7:56 |
| 4. | "স্মৃতির আয়না" (Smritir ayna) | 7:38 |
| 5. | "অসমাপ্ত সান্তনা" (Osomapto santona) | 5:58 |
| 6. | "অতৃতীয়" (Otritiya) | 11:16 |

== Band members ==
- George Lincoln D'Costa – vocals, riff guitar
- Saef Al Nazi Cezanne – bass guitars
- Kazi Sazzadul Asheqeen Shaju – drums
- Kazi Faisal Ahmed – lead guitar
- Iqbal Asif Jewel – lead guitar
