= Oniket Prantor =

Studio album by Bangladeshi band Artcell

অনিকেত প্রান্তর

Studio album by Artcell
- Released: April 1, 2006
- Studios: Dhaka, Bangladesh
- Genres: Progressive metal, progressive rock
- Length: 71:05
- Label: G Series
- Producer: Iqbal Asif Jewel

Artcell chronology
অন্য সময় (Another Time) (2002)	অনিকেত প্রান্তর (2006)	অতৃতীয় (Not Third) (2023)

"Oniket Prantor" (Bengali: অনিকেত প্রান্তর; transl. "No Man's Land") is the second studio album by the Bangladeshi metal band Artcell. It was released on 1 April 2006, 4 years after the release of their first album, Onno Shomoy (Alternate Time). The album has continued to soar in popularity with songs that became cult classics such as ‘Smriti Sharok’, ‘Shohid Sharoni’, ‘Dhushor Shomoy’. The album features a more matured tone than their previous works with more complex compositions and changing time signatures.

The album was released in Bashundara City Shopping Mall where the members of Black, Bassbaba Sumon from Aurthohin and Iqbal Asif Jewel who mixed their album and is now currently one of the band members were all present at the launch.

The second track of the album, ‘Smiriti Sharok’, was dedicated to Rupok, who was their former lyricist before his death and also whom the bands first album was dedicated to.

The 6th track of the album, ‘Chhayar Ninad is an instrumental track, the track that comes after this, ‘Ghune Khawa Roud’ is the continuation of the instrumental, turning into a proper song with vocals.

‘Lin’ and ‘Tomake’ are soft tracks with Tomake featuring only Ershad’s acoustic guitar playing and Lincoln’s vocals.

‘Gontobbohin’ was a heavy track which features fast 16ths on double bass and for the first time in the bands discography, it features growling.

All the songs were about 4-8 minutes long but the title and the albums final track, ‘Oniket Prantor’ was 16 minutes and 21 seconds which is the second longest track recorded in Bangladesh.

== Track listing ==
No.	Title	Length
1.	"লীন" (Lin)	5:04
2.	"স্মৃতি স্মারক" (Smriti smarok)	7:28
3.	"ধূসর সময়" (Dhusor somoy)	6:52
4.	"পাথর বাগান" (Pathor bagan)	5:48
5.	"শহীদ স্মরণী" (Shohid smoroni)	8:25
6.	"ছায়ার নিনাদ" (Chayar ninad)	4:35
7.	"ঘুণে খাওয়া রোদ" (Ghune khaoya rod)	7:31
8.	"তোমাকে" (Tomake)	4:02
9.	"গন্তব্যহীন" (Gontobbohin)	5:59
10.	"অনিকেত প্রান্তর" (Oniket prantor)	16:21
Total length:		71:05

== Personnel ==
=== Band members ===
- George Lincoln D'Costa – vocals, rhythm guitar
- Ershad Zaman – backing vocals, lead guitar
- Saef Al Nazi Cézanne – backing vocals, bass guitars
- Kazi Sajjadul Asheqeen Shaju – drums
