= AmaderGaan.com =

Inactive Bangladeshi music website

amaderGaan
- Website type: Music, social networking and online music shop
- Owner: Amader Gaan Ltd.
- Website: amadergaan.com
- Registration: Optional
- Launched: 31 July 2002
- Current status: inactive

AmaderGaan.com was the only legal online music portal of Bangladesh.

== History ==
AmaderGaan was founded by Faysal Islam on 31 July 2002. Safwan Khan joined later that year. Initially a website was conceived that would be a meeting place for discussing and sharing music. It provided free Bengali mp3 files in the absence of a proper legal system in place back then. Musicians and music lovers joined the community, including Maqsoodul Haque (Mac), formerly of Feedback and in Dhaka and musicians from Rockstrata, Cryptic Fate, Arbovirus, The Watson Brothers, Zefyr, RaaGa, and Artcell.

With Mac's assistance, AmaderGaan jumped from the virtual to the real world in 2004 with the arranging of a charity concert for Abdur Rahman Boyati, a folk musician famous for singing in the style of bauls and boyatis.

In 2005, the organization started a 24-hour online radio station in Bengali. AmaderGaan took up the cause of 35 solo musicians and bands to promote and host their websites. In 2005, music sharing stopped and the first online shop was set up to promote the legal purchase. In 2006, AmaderGaan and New Age, a daily newspaper of Dhaka, began jointly publishing a biweekly chart highlighting sales of the top-selling Bengali albums. New Age published articles written by AmaderGaan members.

AmaderGaan.com later became inactive.

== .Loud ==
In 2006 AmaderGaan along with Sound Machine Ltd, a leading sound equipment sales and rental, audio and video production and musical event management company in Dhaka started a project titled .Loud (dot loud) to promote musicians all over Bangladesh and around the world via Internet and various other activities. Several artistes and musicians who became a part of the .Loud project received free web hosting space and domain from amadergaan.com with a 20% discount on recording costs and practice pads at Sound Machine along with official promotion of the respective bands.
