= Onno Shomoy =

অন্যসময়

Studio album by Artcell
- Released: May 5, 2002
- Recorded: 2 June – 2 August 2001
- Studios: Sound Garden Studio, Dhaka, Bangladesh
- Genres: Progressive metal; progressive rock
- Length: 1:04:52
- Label: G-Series
- Producer: Iqbal Asif Jewel

Artcell chronology
| অন্যসময় (2002) | অনিকেত প্রান্তর (No man's land) (2006) |

Onno Shomoy (Bengali: অন্যসময়; transl. "Alternate Time") is the debut album by the Bangladeshi progressive metal band, Artcell, released in 2002 under G-Series. This album was highly appreciated by metal listeners. This album was one of the first to introduce and develop progressive metal music in Bangladesh. Their sound and compositions differed from other Bangla rock music during that time consisting of fingerstyle guitar intros, unique drum fills with the use of hi-hats and double bass and bass guitar tapping. Their playing style and sound got developed in their upcoming albums as time went on.

The main concept of this album was about Rupok's demise, who wrote many lyrics for the band along with Rumman Ahmed. This album was dedicated to him. In 1999, he was diagnosed with cerebral malaria and he died at a very early age, 3 years before the release of this album. A song called (রুপক: একটি গান; transl. "Rupok: A song") was made in memory of Rupok in this album.

== Track listing ==
| No. | Title | Length |
|---|---|---|
| 1. | "অন্যসময়" (Onnosomoy) | 4:45 |
| 2. | "ভুল জন্ম" (Bhul jonmo) | 6:24 |
| 3. | "পথ চলা" (Poth Chola) | 7:01 |
| 4. | "রুপক (একটি গান)" (Rupok – Ekti gan) | 8:30 |
| 5. | "মুখোশ" (Mukhos) | 5:15 |
| 6. | "রাহুর গ্রাস" (Rahur grass) | 7:27 |
| 7. | "ইতিহাস [সময় / অদৃষ্ট" (Itihas [Somoy / Odristo]) | 6:14 |
| 8. | "কৃত্রিম মানুষ" (Krittim manush) | 6:14 |
| 9. | "অবশ অনুভূতির দেয়াল" (Obosh onubhutir deyal) | 6:40 |
| 10. | "অলস সময়ের পাড়ে" (Olos somoyer pare) | 6:22 |
| Total length: | | 01:04:52 |

== Lyrics ==
"Bhul Jonmo" (ভুল জন্ম) was written by Rupok. He also started "Poth Chola" (পথ চলা) which was his last song but he died before he could complete it. It was later completed by Rumman Ahmed. Lincoln wrote the lyrics for "Rahur Ghrash" (রাহুর গ্রাস) while "Krittim Manush" (কৃত্রিম মানুষ) was written by Cézanne. Obosh Onubhutir Deyal (অবশ অনুভুতির দেয়াল) was written by Ershad. All the other songs were written by Rumman Ahmed.

== Personnel ==
=== Band members ===
- George Lincoln D'Costa – vocals, rhythm guitar
- Ershad Zaman – lead guitar, backing vocal
- Saef Al Nazi (Cézanne) – bass guitar, backing vocal
- Kazi Sajjadul Asheqeen (Shaju) – drums

=== Guest appearances ===
- Iqbal Asif Jewel – keyboards on track 9
- Bassbaba Sumon – backing vocals on track 9

=== Production ===
- Iqbal Asif Jewel – CD mastering
- Isha Khan Duray – recorded, mixed and mastered cassette at Sound Garden Studio
- Rumman Ahmed – album artwork
- Humayun Kabir – album design
