= Nova (Bangladeshi band) =

Bangladeshi rock band

Nova নোভা
- The logo of Nova

Background information
- Origin: Dhaka, Bangladesh
- Genres: Psychedelic rock; Hard rock; Progressive rock
- Years active: 1986-1992, 2010-present
- Labels: Sargam Records; Soundtek Music Ltd; Sangeeta
- Members: Ahmed Fazal; Noor; Sumon; Souren; Murad
- Past members: Shakil Khan; Valo; Tolo; Moy; Zafar; Charu; Pappu; Rana; Ruzvelt; Rubel; SRee; Imran; Antony Samiul Mashooq; Lukan; Sumon

Nova is a Bangladeshi rock band formed in Dhaka in 1986 by Ahmed Fazal. The band rose to prominence in the late 1960s, establishing themselves in Bangladesh. They were one of the most influential bands of that time.

The band's first album is Ahoban. Its title song became very popular then. This anti-drug song received a special award from the government at that time. The second album features a number of lyrical songs. One of them was a song titled "Rajakarer Talika Chai". The song is sung in the style of Pink Floyd's song "Another Brick in the Wall". All songs by Nova, except for Didi Jai of Vaiso album and the songs of the mixed albums, are written and composed by Ahmed Fazal. The band went into a hiatus in the 2000s but made a comeback with the album "Return of the Nova" released in 2010.

Their leader, frontman and lead vocalist Ahmed Fazal has released one solo album, titled, "পাশবিক" (Brutal) in 2014. He wears a white head-band in public and while performing, which had become a mod throughout Bangladesh in the 90s. Their ex-vocalist, Shakil Khan was inactive in music, since 1991, after leaving the band. In 2016, he released his solo album, titled "বছর পর" (pronunciation: Bachara para).

== Discography ==
"ওই, রাজাকার! ছেড়ে যা এই দেশটা আমার!" (Eng."Hey, Rajakar! leave this country of mine!")

- Nova
- "আহবান (Invitation)" (1989)
- "রাজাকারের তালিকা চাই ([We] Want a List of Rajakars)" (1990)
- "স্কুল পলাতক মেয়ে (School Runaway Girl)" (1993)
- "ভাইসো (Float)" (1996)
- "Nova'99 (নোভা'৯৯)" (1999)
- "ঠিকানা (Address)" (2002)
- "Return of the Nova (নোভার প্রত্যাবর্তন)" (2010)
- "একটি বেকার (An Unemployed)" (TBA)

=== Mixed albums ===
- "Stars 2 [স্টার্স ২] (তারকারা ২)"
- "আড্ডা (Adda)"
- "শক্তি (Strength)"
- "প্রেম (Love)"
- "শান্তি (Peace)"
- "ঘৃণা (Hatred)"
- "ক্ষমা (Forgiveness)"
- "ব্যথা (Pain)"
- "শেষ দেখা (Last Meeting)"
- "নেই তুমি (You are Not [Here])"
- "একা উদাসী মনে(Alone in Unconcerned Mood)"
- "ওরা এগার জন (They are Eleven)"

== Members ==
Members of the band are as follows:

=== Current members ===
- Ahmed Fazal - lead vocals, lead guitar, bass guitar, keyboards, rhythm programming, composition, lyrics
- Noor - bass guitar
- Apu - keyboards
- Souren - lead guitar, back vocals
- Murad - drums

=== Past members ===
- Shakil Khan - vocals
- Valo - bass guitar, vocals
- Tolo - keyboards, vocals
- Moy - drums
- Charu - bass guitar
- Pappu - keyboards
- Zafar - manager, guitar
- SRee - drummer, vocals
- Rana - drums
- Ruzvelt - keyboards
- Rubel - drums
- Imran
- Antony Samiul Mashooq
- Lukan - drums
- Sumon - lead guitar

=== Nova first line-up ===
- Ahmed Fazal - lead vocals, lead guitar, bass guitar, keyboards, composition, lyrics
- Valo - bass guitar, vocals
- Tolo - keyboards, vocals
- Moy - drums
- Shakil - vocals
- Zafar - manager, guitar
