= Karnival (band) =

Bangladeshi heavy metal band

Karnival কার্নিভাল
- Origin: Dhaka, Bangladesh
- Genres: Alternative rock, Experimental rock, Pop rock
- Years active: 2006–present
- Labels: MBI Records; Independent
- Members: Tinu Rashid; Khalid Ashraf; Salmi Rahman; Mousum Dhamai
- Past members: Tonmoy; Sabbir; Sunny

Karnival (Bengali: কার্নিভাল) is a Bangladeshi alternative rock band formed in 2006 in Dhaka, Bangladesh. They are one of the experimental rock bands in Bangladesh. The band rose to mainstream fame in the early 2020s with their hit songs like "Sheishob Din Raatri", "Rupkothar Majhe", "Shes Prarthona", and tracks from their breakthrough release Mohomukti. Since 2006, they have released four studio albums. The line-up includes vocalist and guitarist Tinu Rashid, lead guitarist Salmi Rahman, bassist Mousum Dhamai, and drummer Khalid Ashraf.

== History ==
On 13 July 2006, Karnival was formed in Dhaka, Bangladesh by Tinu Rashid and Tonmoy with the initial goal of playing underground grunge music. They were subsequently joined by musicians Sabbir and Sunny, which allowed the band to begin performing live shows. Initially spelling their name "Carnival", the band officially changed the spelling to "Karnival" while working on an early mixed album to avoid confusion with a music production company of the same name. Before releasing solo material, the band contributed the original tracks "Rupkothar Majhe" to the mixed album Obbhudoy and "Shes Prarthona" to Droho, both released under MBI Records. On 19 September 2009, Karnival released their nine-track debut rock album, Indraloy.

By 2011, the band finalized its stable lineup when musicians Salmi Rahman (guitar), Mousum Dhamai (bass), and Khalid Ashraf (drums) officially joined founding vocalist and guitarist Tinu Rashid. On 20 September 2012, the band shifted toward an experimental rock sound with their second album, Attotshorgo. In 2014, they released their third studio album, Dysfunctional Motion Picture, which was originally composed as the score for a canceled film and subsequently released independently online for free.

In 2016, recording for their fourth studio album, Mohomukti, began, but its release was delayed until 2020. The six-track album, produced by Tinu Rashid and mixed by Dewan Anamul Hasan, marked a stylistic transition into pop, disco, funk, and alternative rock. Its opening track, "Sheishob Din Raatri", was penned in 2017 as a dedication to Tinu Rashid's late elder brother, Mahbub Ur Rashid. Mohomukti became a sleeper hit on streaming platforms like Spotify and YouTube during the COVID-19 pandemic, significantly increasing the band's mainstream visibility. Following this success, Karnival hosted their first solo concert, "Live from Control Room", in 2021. The event sold out within ten days and was followed by a sequel show.

On 8 March 2023, they performed at the Joy Bangla Concert, organized by the Centre for Research & Information (CRI) and Young Bangla to commemorate the historic 7 March Speech of Sheikh Mujibur Rahman. On 15 September 2023, Karnival played at "The School of Rock Volume 1" concert, where a portion of the revenue was allocated toward the treatment, nutrition, and vaccination of stray dogs and cats in Dhaka. On 24 November 2023, the band performed without remuneration at the "To Gaza, From Dhaka – Artists Against Genocide" charity concert. The event raised BDT 1.2 million, which was directed to NGOs such as the Palestine Children's Relief Fund, the Red Crescent, and UNRWA USA to provide humanitarian aid to Palestinian civilians.

=== Members ===
Tinu Rashid – vocals, guitars (2006–present)

Salmi Rahman – lead guitars (2011–present)

Mousum Dhamai – bass guitars (2011–present)

Khalid Ashraf – drums (2011–present)

Tonmoy – guitars (2006–2011)

Sabbir – bass, guitars (2006–2011)

Sunny – drums (2006–2011)

=== Touring ===
Sharar Shayor – guest musician

Ibon Ibtesam – guest musician

== Discography ==
=== Studio albums ===
- Indraloy (2009)
- Attotshorgo (2012)
- Dysfunctional Motion Picture (2014)
- Mohomukti (2020)

=== Mixed albums ===
- Obbhudoy
- Droho
