= Severe Dementia (band) =

Bangladeshi death metal band

Severe Dementia সিভিয়ার ডিমেনশিয়া
- Also known as: 666 (2004–2006)
- Origin: Dhaka, Bangladesh
- Genres: Death metal; Technical Death Metal
- Years active: 2004–present
- Labels: Demonstealer; Transcending Obscurity
- Members: Riasat Azmi; Saimum Hasan Nahian; Samir Hafiz Khan; Kawsar Ahmed Pervez; Raef al Hasan Rafa
- Past members: Ahmed Shawki; Arefin Ahmed Sazeed
- Website: severedementia.com

Severe Dementia is a Bangladeshi metal band formed in Dhaka in January 2004. Their initial name was 666. They are considered to be one of the first death metal band from Bangladesh. They are a pioneering band of the East Bengal Extreme Metal scene. Their EP Epitaph of Plassey is widely regarded as one of the most influential death metal record in Bangladesh.

== History ==
In 2004, Ahmed Shawki and his friend Saimum Hasan Nahian created a band named 666. It was a bold approach because the band culture of Dhaka was not very much introduced to extreme metal musics like death metal then. Gradually this band became a pioneer of death metal music of Bangladesh. During 2012–2016, the band was inactive because its vocal Ahmed Shawki left the country and went to Australia. Since then, Riasat Azmi is serving as vocalist of this band.

Severe Dementia draws its lyrical themes from ancient and historical events which created a major impact on certain nations and the human race. Their songs provide brutality, blistering speed and technical proficiency in composing. They also introduced aggressive drum blasts, guttural growls and screams and pure aggression rendered guitar lines in their tracks, which were very rare and uncommon in the history of Bangladesh's rock-metal music genre.

== Albums and performances ==
In February 2007, Severe Dementia signed a deal with Demonstealer Records (India) to release an EP in a split album Rise of the Eastern Blood with Demonic Resurrection (India), Dusk (Pakistan) and Helmksey (Singapore). The conceptual EP is entitled as Epitaph of Plassey with 5 continuous songs based on the historical Battle of Plassey between the British East India Company and the Bengal Nawab Siraj ud-Daulah in 1757. Their other tracks are-

- Defloracioun of Tiamat (Demo)
- Emissaries Of Kingu (Demo)
- Shudder Thee Incensed Goddess (Demo)
- Slayer of the Snarling Tormentor (Demo)
- The Tormentor
- Demented Mentation

Severe Dementia undertook a tour in India in April 2007 as being the first ever underground band from Bangladesh to play overseas. The opening of the album took place at the last concert of the tour on 8 April 2007, at Razzberry Rhinoceros, Mumbai. The band played in two shows at Mumbai and Pune.

Their next album is going to be in theme of ancient Sumerian mythology.

On 9 July 2017 the band revisited India while performing at Kolkata Death Fest (3rd edition) at Jadavpur university Triguna Sen Auditorium, Kolkata. The show was powered by the Lizard & Skin Tattoos & Hellion Distro.

== Discography ==
=== EP ===
- Epitaph of Plassey (2007)

== Band members ==
=== Present members ===
- Riasat Azmi – vocals (2016–present)
- Saimum Hasan Nahian – guitars (2004–present)
- Samir Hafiz Khan – guitars (2010–present)
- Kawser Ahmed Pervez – bass (2012–present)
- Raef al Hasan Rafa – drums (2004–present)

=== Past members ===
- Ahmed Shawki – vocals (2004–2012)
- Arefin Ahmed Sazeed – bass (2004–2012)
