= Raef Al Hasan Rafa =

Bangladeshi singer-songwriter

Raef Al Hasan Rafa রাইফ আল হাসান রাফা
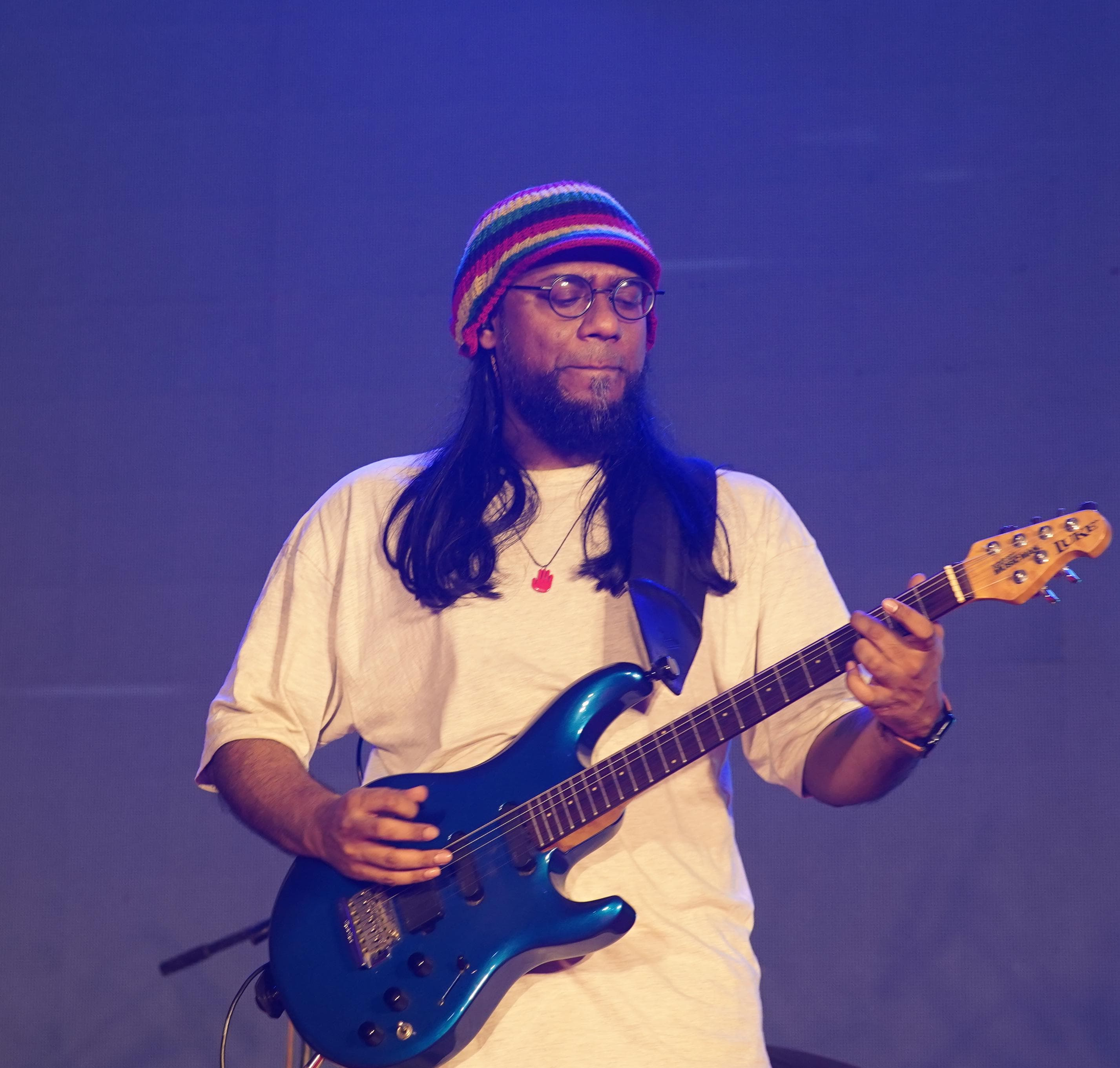
- Rafa at St. Joseph Higher Secondary School in 2025

Background information
- Born: Raef al Hasan Rafa; 27 October 1988 (age 37)
- Genres: Heavy metal; progressive metal; death metal; hard rock; art rock
- Occupations: Musician; singer-songwriter; producer
- Instruments: Drums; bass; vocals; guitar; keyboard; banjo; mandolin; sitar; harmonium; ukulele
- Years active: 2003–present
- Label: G Series
- Formerly of: Aurthohin,Cryptic Fate,Severe Dementia (band)
- Spouse: Samira Kamil (m. 2021)

Raef Al Hasan Rafa (born 27 October 1988) is a Bangladeshi singer, songwriter, and multi-instrumentalist. He is best known as the former drummer of rock band Aurthohin and metal band Cryptic Fate. He was also member of metal band Severe Dementia, Kral and The Joint Family. He is the founding member of the rock band AvoidRafa.

== Biography ==
=== Beginnings ===
Due to his father's job posting, he spent some time of his childhood in Libya, he was the youngest child of his family, and is the younger brother of Saadi Muktafi, a guitarist and the founding member of the band Kraal. He spent most of his early childhood in Libya. After returning to Bangladesh at the age of 5, he got admitted to Maple Leaf International School in Dhaka, Bangladesh. He was pushed to learn Nazrul Geeti,a local genre of song and harmonium during his childhood, but he scarcely had any interest in music back then.

=== Marriage Life ===
Raef Al Hasan Rafa married Samira Kamil. They posted about their married status on Facebook on 23 August 2021.

== Discography ==
=== AvoidRafa ===
(studio album)

- Bhaar (2016)
- Eto Boka Keno Tumi (2026)

=== Aurthohin ===
(studio album)

- Dhrubok (2003)
- Aushomapto 1 (2008)
- Aushomapto-2 (2011)

=== Kral ===
(singles only)

- Shesh @ Agontuk 2 (2004)
- Opekhay @ Lokayot (2004)
- Ek janala akasher manchitro@ Underground (2006)
- Klanto Bohumatrikta @ Underground 2 (2007)
- Song for Jewel Bhai @ Rock 101 (2008)
- Shonga Monushshotto @ Rock 303 (2009)
- Shonga Shongjom @ Rock 505 (2010)
- Shurjaioner Suru @ Rock 606 (2011)

=== Severe Dementia ===
(singles only)

- Howls of Murshidabad @ Rise of the Eastern Blood (2007)
- Credence of Fort William @ Rise of the Eastern Blood (2007)
- Shudder Thee Incensed Goddess @ Rock 505 (2010)

=== The Joint Family ===
(singles only)

- Revolution @ Rock 202 (2009)
- Bhaar @ Ashor(2010)
- The Bicycle Day @ Rock 404 (2010)
- Vision of a Minds Garden@ Rock 707 (2011)

with Dripping Gore
(singles only)

- Bimur Monushotter Udvason @ Agontuk 2 e(2005)

=== Cryptic Fate ===
(studio album)

- Noy Mash (2024)

=== Solo career ===
(singles only)

- Sriticharon @ Kromannoy (2009)
- Pichutan @ Kromannoy (2009)
- Ektu Bristhi @ The Hit Album 2 (2010)
- Tui Nei Tai @ Deep Nevar Age (2010)
- Abar (ukulele version) (2014)
- Tumi r Ami @ Otopor (2014)
- Tui, Ami r Tora @ VItamin T (2014)
- Ami Akash Pathabo @ Ami Akash Pathabo (2015)

=== As a music producer/sound engineer ===
- Powersurge – Oprostut Juddho (2008)
- Topu – Shey Ke (2010)
- Sharmin – Ontorip (2011)
- Mechanix – Oporajeyo (2011)
- Air & Air – A Time to Break the Silence (2011)
- Aurthohin – Aushomapto-2 (2011)
- Cryptic Fate – Noy Maash (2013)
- IGNEEOUS – Bibhajon(OST) (2019)

=== TV/radio commercials and other soundtracks ===
- Ecstasy (2006)
- Mojo 500 (2007)
- BTTB (2007)
- Rexona (2007)
- Aktel café 8000 (2008)
- UNDP education awareness theme song (2008)
- Grameen phone 26 March theme track (2008)
- Banglalink eid( 2008)
- Nestle (2008)
- Bangladesh General Election theme track (2008)
- Union Capital (2009)
- BBC Bangladesh Radio (2009)
- Marks all-rounder theme track (2010)
- British American Tobacco Bangladesh worker motivational theme track (2010)
- United Airways theme track (2010)
- Panda Antivirus (2012)
- Grameen Phone WAP service of Qur'an interpretation and meaning (2012)
- GPIT theme track (2012)
- Grameen Phone re-branding 'Go Free' theme track (2012)
- Golden Harvest trade fair promotional track (2012)
- One world one Djuice (2012)
- Grameen Phone Internet utshob (2012)
- Telenor internal employee motivational theme track (2012)
- Commonwealth Games official theme tracks (2013)
- British American Tobacco LOS theme track (2013)
- Dhaka Tribune promotional theme track (produced by Johan Alamgir) (2013)
- Grameen phone valentine theme track (2013)
- Femicon official theme track (2013)
- Coca-Cola 'FIFA 2014' official theme track(Bangladesh) (2014)
- Close up Valentine's Day telefilm 'Otopor' theme track (2014)
