= Iqbal Asif Jewel =

Bangladeshi singer-songwriter

Iqbal Asif Jewel ইকবাল আসিফ জুয়েল
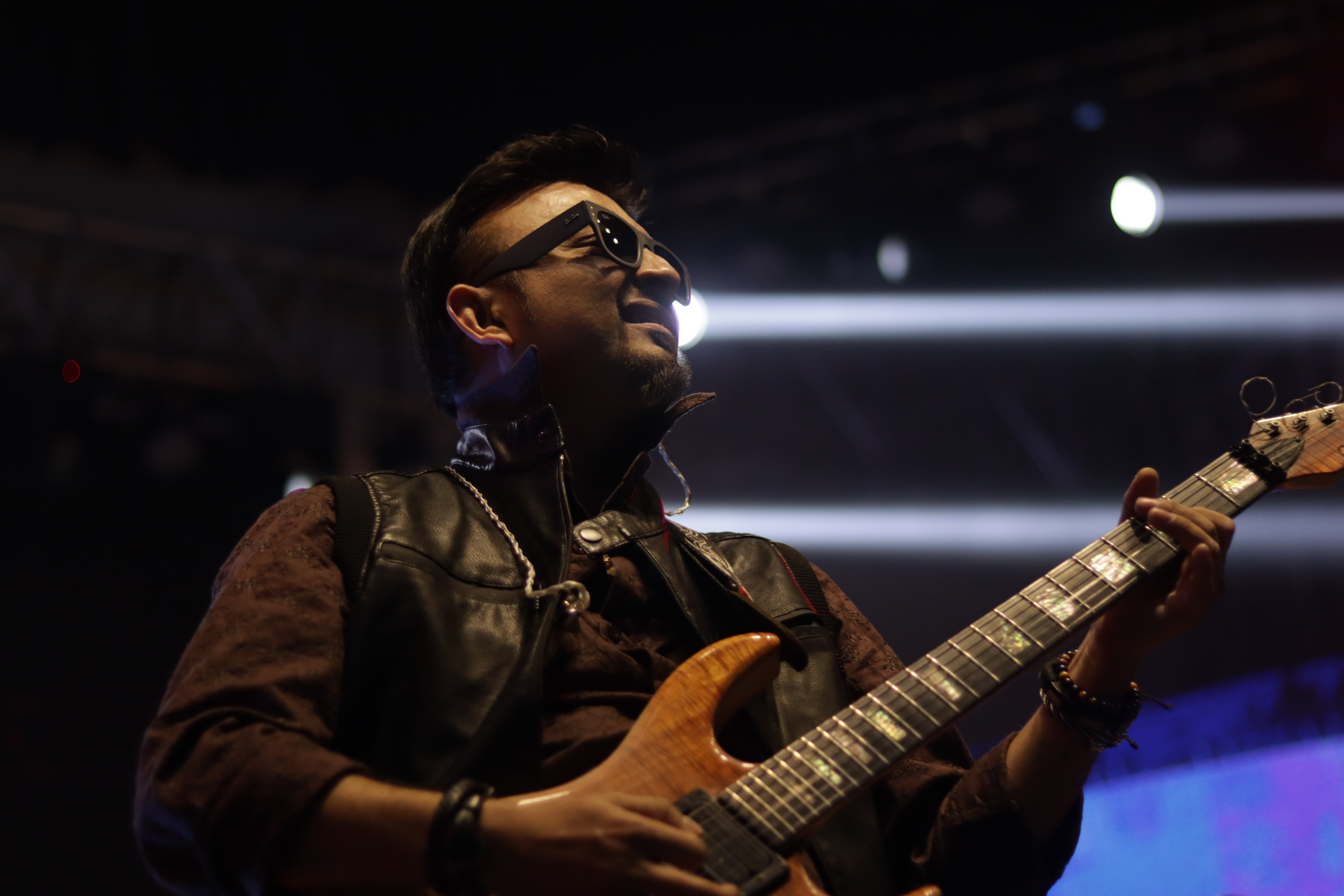
- Iqbal Asif Jewel in 2024

Background information
- Born: 1 March; Bangladesh
- Occupations: Singer, songwriter, guitarist, composer, producer
- Instruments: guitar, vocal

Iqbal Asif Jewel (born 1 March) is a Bangladeshi singer, songwriter, guitarist, composer and producer. He is currently a member of the band Miles and Artcell.

== Career ==
Iqbal's first band was Legend, whose first album was Onnobhubon. After the rest of the band left to continue their academic studies, he joined Warfaze, a rock band that was one of the first Bangladeshi rock bands to incorporate elements of heavy metal and progressive metal/progressive rock in its songs.

In 1999, Jewel joined Miles.

As a solo artist, Jewel has released several albums including an instrumental fusion-rock album X Factor, and a collaboration with long-time friends from other bands; Jewel with the Stars and Jewel with the Stars 2.

Jewel has also produced or mixed several albums, including Sumon's first solo album Shopno gulo tomar moto, and Artcell's second studio album Oniket Prantor.

Jewel released a compilation album, Rock 101, in December 2008. In 2009, Eid al-Fitr Jewel released the dual Rock 202 and Rock 303. He also released Rock 404, Rock 505, Rock 606, Rock 707, Rock 808, Rock 909 and Rock X0X.

In 2023, Jewel joined Artcell.

== Discography ==
=== Solo ===
- X Factor

==== Compilation albums ====
- Rock 101
- Rock 202
- Rock 303
- Rock 404
- Rock 505
- Rock 606
- Rock 707
- Rock 808
- Rock 909
- Rock X0X

=== Miles ===
- "প্রবাহ" (Flow) (2000)
- "প্রতিধ্বনি" (Echoes) (2006)
- "প্রতিচ্ছবি" (Reflections) (2015)
- "প্রবর্তন" (Induction) (2016)

=== Warfaze ===
- জীবন ধারা (lifestyle) (1997)
- অসামাজিক (Antisocial) (1998)
