= Artcell =

Bangladeshi progressive metal band

Artcell আর্টসেল
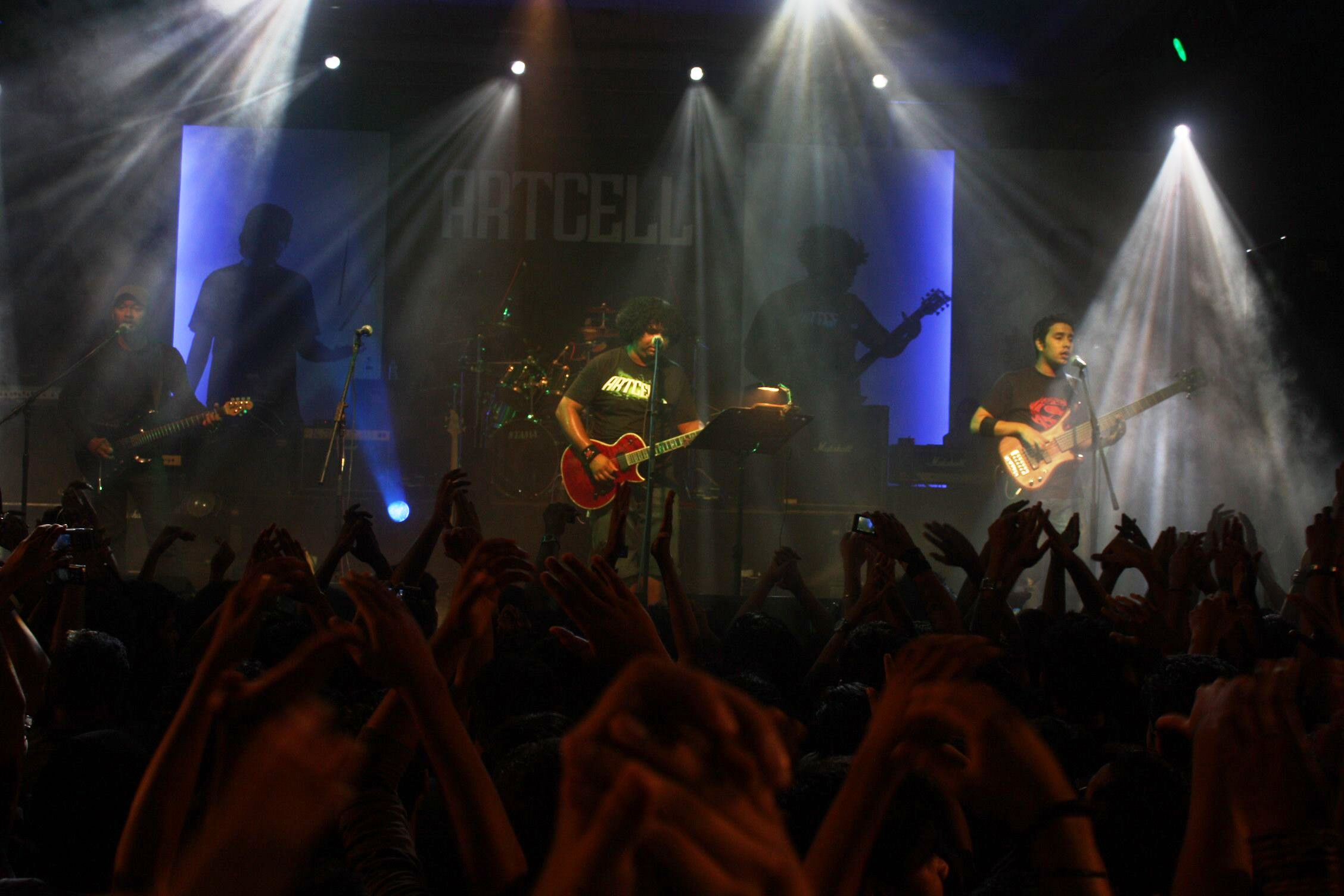
- Artcell at a live concert

Background information
- Origin: Dhaka, Bangladesh
- Genres: Progressive metal; Heavy Metal
- Years active: 1999–present
- Label: G-Series
- Members: George Lincoln D'Costa; Kazi Faisal Ahmed; Saef Al Nazi Cezanne; Kazi Asheqeen Shaju; Iqbal Asif Jewel; Bakhtiar Hossain
- Past members: Ershad Zaman
- Website: artcell.band

Artcell is a Bangladeshi progressive metal band formed in 23 October 1999, by vocalist and riff guitarist George Lincoln D'Costa, lead guitarist Ershad Zaman, bassist Saef Al Nazi Cézanne and drummer Kazi Sajjadul Asheqeen Shaju.

The first song the band composed was ‘অন্য সময় (Onno Shomoy)’. The song set the standard for all the songs yet to come along the way. The first song released by Artcell was ‘Odekha Shorgo’ which was recorded for the great Azam Khan for a mixed album he was planning on. But later it was released on a mixed album called Charpotro. The song "Onnoshomoy" was written by Rumman Ahmed and ‘Odekha Shorgo’ by Rupok. Both Rumman and Rupok were very close friends of the band members; and together they wrote most of the songs for Artcell. During that time songwriter Rupok died from cerebral malaria on 2002. Rupok left when the band was working on their first solo album ‘অন্য সময় (Other Time)’, which was later released in CD's on May 5, 2002 and was dedicated in remembering of Rupok . And after four years of releasing ‘Onno Shomoy’; Artcell came up with their second album 'Oniket Prantor' on 2006 which led them widespread recognition. Due to various unavoidable reasons, then lead guitarist Ershad Zaman was let go off from the band. They pronounced Kazi Faisal Ahmed as their permanent lead guitarist on 08 November 2018. On July 26, 2018 after 12 years since their last album the band announced that they were going to release their third album very soon. After years of various incidents and speculations, their third album 'Otritiyo' was released in late March 2023.

According to The Daily Star, Artcell is one of the bands of the country.

== History ==
=== Formation and early days (1999–2000) ===
Before forming the band, the four founding members were school friends from Dhaka and used to get together to play Metallica songs. Ershad and Lincoln were in a band called Tantrik. In 1999 their frontman and other members left. The duo then started looking for a bassist and soon enough Cezanne joined as the bassist. However they still needed a drummer, so Shaju took up the drums within three months. They continued Tantrik and later renamed it to Artcell, they used to cover Metallica and in their first concert they covered ‘Inner-Self’ by Sepultura and many other heavy metal songs. Later on, they started listening to Dream Theatre which hugely influenced all of the members playing style and ultimately the band became a progressive metal band. They continued to play shows in the local underground scene, most notably at The Russian Cultural Center (RCC) in Dhaka. After their progressive influences, they started doing harder songs like ‘Metropolis—Part I: The Miracle and the Sleeper’ and ‘Pull Me Under’ in terms of time signatures which most bands didn’t do at the time. What started as an underground band is now one of the most recognized mainstream bands in the Bengali metal music scene.

The name "Artcell" was decided upon because it was softer sounding than a typical heavy metal name. In Cézanne and Shaju's words:

Even though we were a heavy metal band when we started, we didn't want a heavy metal name. We wanted a softer or more artistic touch to the heavy metal side. 'Cells where art is produced' – that was pretty much the basic idea behind the name 'Artcell'. Ershad came up with it and we all opted for it.

=== Onno Shomoy (অন্য সময়) (2000–2002) ===
After releasing songs through compilation albums, Artcell released their debut studio album Onno Shomoy in 2002 under the label record, G-Series. It was both critically and commercially successful, being one of the first albums to introduce progressive metal music to Bangladeshi listeners. The band lost its main songwriter Rupok to cerebral malaria while working on this album. The album was dedicated to him. One of the songs was titled "রুপক একটি গান (Rupok A Song)" in his memory.

=== Oniket Prantor (অনিকেত প্রান্তর) (2002–2006) ===
After the success of Onno Shomoy, Artcell spent four years carrying out experiments with their music without releasing an album. They did, however, release singles scattered in various albums by other bands or compilation albums. Their second studio album "Aniket Prantor (No man's land)" was released in April 2006. The album was one of the top sellers of the year.

"Aniket Prantor (No man's land)", the album's namesake, is Artcell's longest song to date, at 16 minutes and 21 seconds.

In May the band performed their second solo concert at Dhaka's Bashundhara Convention Centre.

=== Conflict within the band and departure of Ershad (2007–2019) ===
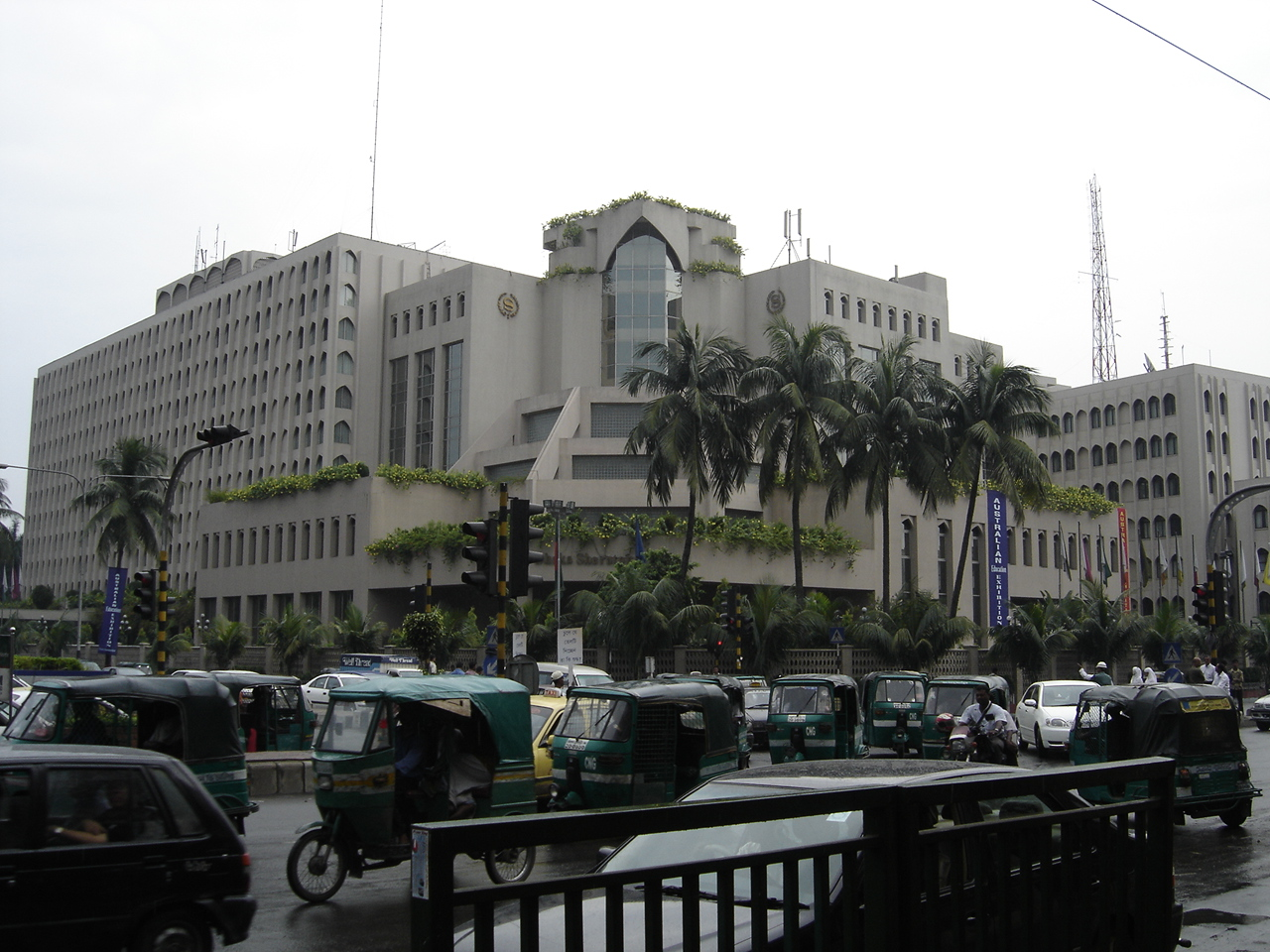
The Dhaka Sheraton, now Intercontinental is where the "10 Years of Artcell Insanity" concert took place

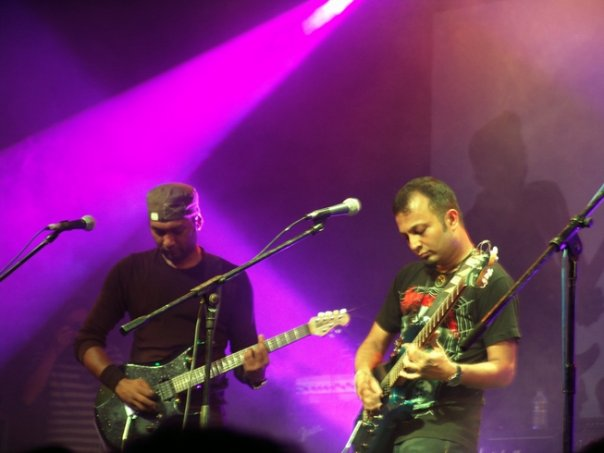
Ershad Zaman with Iqbal Asif Jewel at 10 Years of Artcell Insanity concert

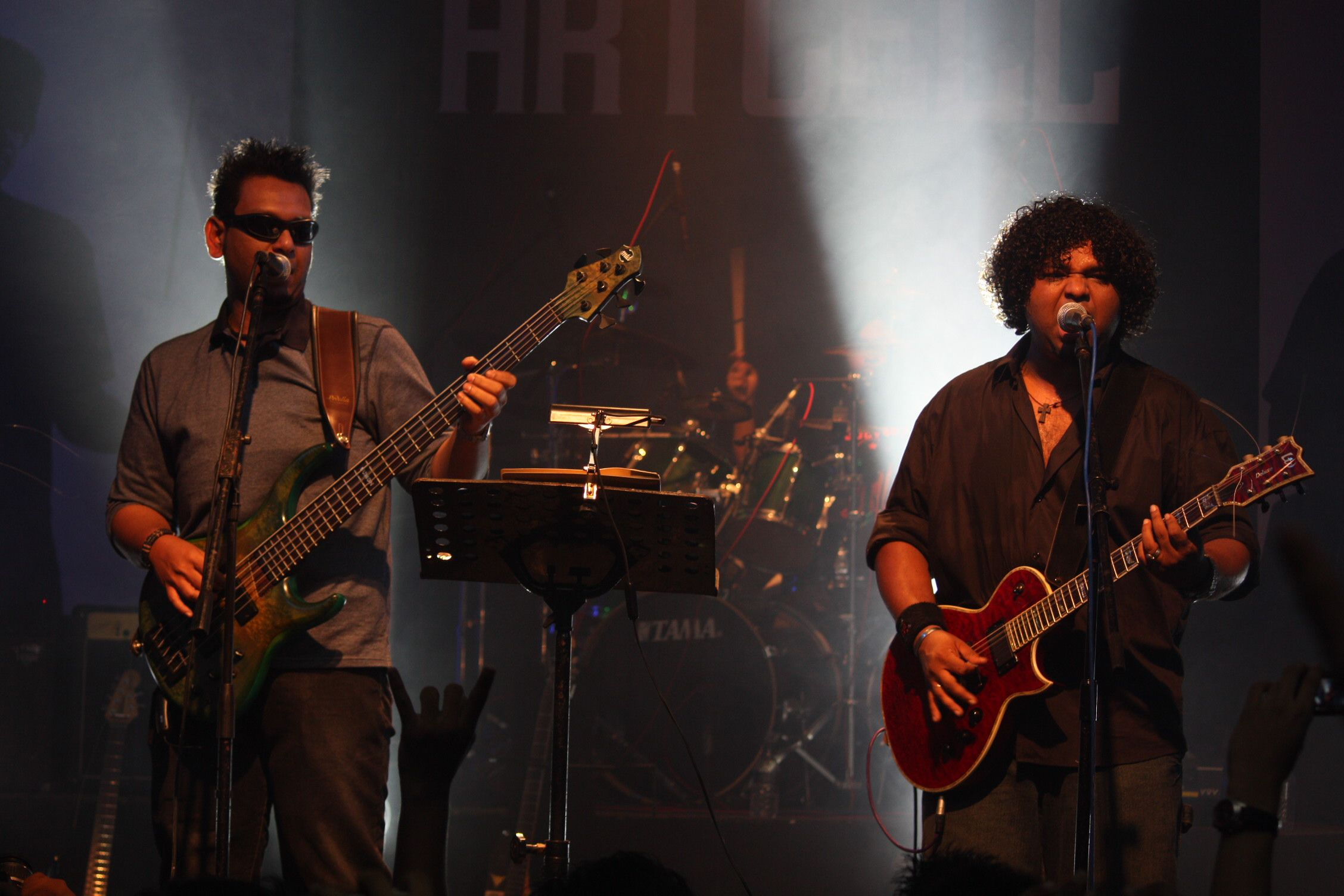
Sharing the stage with Aurthohin's Bassbaba Sumon(2009)

Artcell celebrated its 10th anniversary tour on 23 October 2009 with a live concert entitled "10 Years of Artcell Insanity" at the Winter Garden, Dhaka Sheraton Hotel.

In 2009 the band took part in the "International Coastal Cleanup 2009", a day-long beach clean-up movement, at the Cox's Bazar sea beach.

The band was due to be one of the country's leading bands to perform at a concert against violence against women in the Banani Army Stadium, Dhaka, in December 2010.

On 9 January 2012, Artcell announced the release of their third album and confirmed that it would be released by the end of the year. They posted on their Facebook page: "This is to inform all Artcell fans and friends who have been waiting for our 3rd album, wait just for a few more months and Hopefully you won't be disappointed. In addition, Artcell is also getting ready with some special releases...Music, videos and communication contents. So, look forward to a year full of activities. Thank you all again for your love and support. You guys are our true strength. Thank you".

Artcell worked on their third album in 2013.

They played in "Rocknation Overload" on 19 April 2014 after a break of around two years.

In 2016, Artcell released their new music video "Obimrishshota" from their third album Otriteeyo with the original band lineup. After almost 10 years their new song had been released, written by their new lyricist Ishtiak.

In the 17 years since its inception, the band has released two albums. Their third album was scheduled to be released in December 2016. Initially scheduled for a 2012 release, it is widely speculated that the delay is due to Cézanne and Shaju's inactivity, and to Ershad and Lincoln's busy schedule. But later band members among themselves created controversy fighting each other on social media. There was three versus one fight, as Ershad was all alone. Lincoln carried out the band with his favorite students and knowns.

In November 2018, Kazi Faisal Ahmed (founder and lead guitarist of Metal Maze) joined Artcell as their permanent lead guitarist and performed in the highly esteemed open-air concert "Joy Bangla" Concert. Artcell released a heavy-sounding track with Kazi Faisal Ahmed playing the solo within a very short time. Later that year, Artcell played on their 20th anniversary open-air gig in the Expo Zone of International Convention City Bashundhara (ICCB).

=== Otritio (অতৃতীয়) (2023) ===
In 2023, Iqbal Asif Jewel (lead guitarist of Miles) joined Artcell as their third lead guitarist.

Despite the album's title translating to Not Third, Otritio is Artcell's 3rd long awaited studio album after Oniket Prantor, released on 23 February 2023, after 17 years. Global release of this album was on 9 March 2023. Artcell played on their Otritio open-air gig in the International Convention City Bashundhara (ICCB).

== Influences and playing style ==
Metallica and Sepultura were huge influence on the band. However, they identified themselves as a progressive metal band after listening to Dream Theatre. The EP, A Change of Seasons and the album, Images and Words inspired them to challenge themselves to pursue and play progressive music.

Mike Portnoy (Dream Theatre), Vinnie Paul (Pantera) and Igor Cavalera (Sepultura) were huge influences and inspirations that shaped Shaju’s progressive style of drumming with his implementation of odd timing and creative grooves and fills most notably his variation of 16ths and 32ths notes on the hi-hat, various tricky double bass patterns as well as rhythmic ride bell hits also with a lot of variations. He stated in a podcast that he enjoys these time signature changes in songs which makes the song more fun to play. This level of creativity and technique wasn’t very common among other drummers, especially the progressive genre in the country’s music scene in the early 2000s when the band first started.

Mark Knopfler of The Dire Straits was a big influence on Ershad Zaman’s lead guitar playing. During the beginning of his band music career, he liked to play fingerstyle acoustic guitar, mostly classical. When the band started to explore progressive music, he started to follow John Petrucci of Dream Theatre. Throughout the band’s first and second albums, his implementation of acoustic guitar can be noticed as well as melodies and guitar solos on almost all of the songs from these albums as well as the band’s singles until his departure from the band. Most of the solos from these albums were quite long and technical and some songs had more than one solo.

James Hetfield was a huge influence on Lincoln’s powerful vocals and heavy rhythm guitar riffs. He and Shaju were also huge Death Metal fans of bands like Cannibal Corpse and Sepultura when they were young.

Flea, Billy Sheehan and Steve Harris of Iron Maiden as well as other punk bands were a huge influence on Cézanne’s bass playing. He stated in an interview with Bass Musician that as a kid he didn’t want to play common instruments. He played guitar for three years so that he could pick up a bass. His bass lines are highly technical and melodious, one of his iconic bass techniques is tapping on the fretboard with two different rhythms played by both hands mostly used in bass solos in many of the band’s songs.

== Members ==
=== Present ===
- George Lincoln D'Costa – vocal, riff guitars (1999–present)
- Saef Al Nazi Cézanne – bass (1999–present)
- Kazi Sajjadul Asheqeen Shaju – drums (1999–present)
- Kazi Faisal Ahmed – lead guitar (2018–present)
- Iqbal Asif Jewel – lead guitar & synth (2023–present)
- Bakhtiar Hossain – vocal, riff guitars (2026-present)

=== Past ===
- Ershad Zaman – lead guitar (1999–2017)

== Discography ==
Artcell has released a total of 45 tracks till March 2023. Among them, 26 are from their 3 studio album, 13 from band mixed albums and 6 Singles. The first released song was Odekha Shorgo (অদেখা স্বর্গ) in 2001 from the band's mixed album Chharpotro (ছারপত্র). The last released song was Harano Chetona (হারানো চেতনা) in 2022, it was a single release. Artcell released their long-awaited 3rd album "Otritio" on 23 February 2023 exclusively on GAAN.app. Global release of this album was on 09 March, 2023.

=== Studio albums ===
Artcell has released 26 songs under their own studio albums.

- Onno Shomoy (2002)
- Oniket Prantor (2006)
- Otritiyo (2023)

=== Band mixed albums ===
Artcell has released 13 songs from 12 different band mixed albums.

- Chharpotro (2001)
  - অদেখা স্বর্গ (Odhekha Shorgo)
- Anushilon (2002)
  - অপ্সরী (Opshori)
  - দুঃখ বিলাশ (Dukkho Bilash)
- Agontuk (2003)
  - অস্তিত্বের দিকে পদধ্বনির সম্মোহন (Ostitter Dike Pododdhonir Shommohon)
- Projonmo (2003)
  - স্বপ্নের কোরাস (Shopner Chorus)
- Agontuk-2 (2004)
  - চিলে কোঠার সেপাই (Chile Kothar Shepai)
- Lokayoto (2004)
  - ছেঁড়া আকাশ (Chera Akash)
- Agontuk-3 (2005)
  - বাংলাদেশ...স্মৃতি ও আমরা (Bangladesh...Shriti O Amra)
- Underground (2006)
  - উৎসবের উৎসাহে (Utshober Utshahe)
- Live Now (2007)
  - এই বিদায়ে (Ei Bidaye)
- Rock 303 (2009)
  - কান্ডারী হুশিয়ার (Kandari Hushiar)
- Din Bodol (2004)
  - আশীর্বাদ (Ashirbad) [with Black and Cryptic Fate]
- Riotous 14 (2014)
  - কারার ঐ লৌহ কপাট (Karar Oi Louho Kopat)

=== Singles ===
Artcell has released 6 singles.

- হুংকারের অপেক্ষায় (Hunkarer Opekkhay) (2011)
- স্পর্শের অনুভূতি (Sporsher Onuvuti) (2016)
- অবিমৃষ্যতা (Obimrishshota) (2016)
- সংশয় (Shongshoy) (2019)
- অভয় (Obhoy) (2019)
- হারানো চেতনা (Harano Chetona) (2022)

=== Live album ===
- The Platform Live: Artcell (Season 1, Vol.1) (2022)
1. Ei Bidaye
2. Chile Kothar Shepai
3. Dhushor Shomoy
4. Uthshober Uthshahe
5. Poth Chola
6. Dukkho Bilash
7. Onno Shomoy

== Videography ==
Artcell has done music videos of some of their greatest hit song. They have 8 music videos.

- "অলস সময়ের পাড়ে (Lazy Time Shifts)"
- "বাংলাদেশ... স্মৃতি ও আমরা (Bangladesh... Memories and Us)"
- "লীন (Leen)"
- "পাথর বাগান (Stone Garden)"
- "অন্য সময় (Other Times)"
- "ধুসর সময় (Gray Times)"
- "অবিমৃষ্যতা (Ingenuity)"
- "অদেখা স্বর্গ (Unseen Heaven)"
