= Bangladesh National Film Award for Best Cinematography =

- Awarded for: For the contribution of Bangladeshi cinema in Cinematography category
- Location: Dhaka
- Country: Bangladesh
- Presented by: President of Bangladesh
- First award: 1977
- Final award: 2016
- Website: moi.gov.bd

The Bangladesh National Film Award for Best Cinematography is one of the highest film awards in Bangladesh. Since 1975, the awards are given in the category of best screenplay.

== List of winners ==
Year	Name of Winner	Film	Notes
1975	Baby Islam	Charitraheen	
1976	Harunur Rashid	Megher Onek Rong	
1977	Reza Latif (Black and White); MA Mobin (Color)	Ononto Prem; Simana Periye	
1978	Arun Roy (Black and White); Rafiqul Bari Chowdhury (Color)	Surja Dighal Bari; Golapi Ekhon Traine	
1979	Anwar Hossain (Black and White); Arun Roy (Color)	Sundori; Badhu Biday	
1980	Shafiqul Islam Swapan (Black and White); Anwar Hossain (Color)	Ghuddi; Emiler Goenda Bahini	
1981	No Award		
1982	Rafiqul Bari Chowdhury (Black and White); Shafiqul Islam Swapan (Color)	Dui Poisar Alta; Nalish	
1983	Anwar Hossain (Black and White); Arun Roy (Color)	Puroskar; Johny	
1984	Baby Islam (Black and White); Mahfuzur Rahman Khan (Color)	Obhijan	
1985	Baby Islam (Color)	Premik	
1986	Sadhan Roy	Shuvoda	
1987	Abul Khayer (Black and White); Mahfuzur Rahman Khan (Color)	Setubandhan; Sohojatri	
1988	Rafiqul Bari Chowdhury	Heeramati	
1989	Arun Roy	Bhaijan	
1990	Reza Latif	Goriber Bou	
1991	Abu Hena Bablu	Pita Mata Santan	
1992	Anwarul Islam Baby	Dinkal	
1993	A R Zahangir Abujh	Santan	
1994	Kazi Bashir; Hasan Ahmed	Ghrina; Ghorer Shotru	
1995	Anwar Hossain	Anya Jibon	
1996	Mahfuzur Rahman Khan	Poka Makorer Ghor Bosoti	
1997	MA Mobin	Dukhai	
1998	Akhtar Hossain	Hothat Brishti	
1999	Mahfuzur Rahman Khan	Srabon Megher Din	
2000	Mahfuzur Rahman Khan	Dui Duari	
2001	Abul Khayer; Anwar Hossain	Shoshurbari Zindabad; Lalsalu	
2002	Shahidullah Dulal	Hason Raja	
2003	Maksudul Bari	Adhiar	
2004	Rafiqul Bari Chowdhury (posthumous)	Joyjatra	
2005	Mahfuzur Rahman Khan	Hajar Bachhor Dhore	
2006	Hasan Ahmed	Ghani	
2007	Saiful Islam Badal	Aha!	
2008	Mahfuzur Rahman Khan	Amar Ache Jol	
2009	Mahfuzur Rahman Khan	Britter Baire	
2010	Hasan Ahmed	Gohine Shobdo	
2011	L. Apu Rosario	Amar Bondhu Rashed	
2012	Mahfuzur Rahman Khan	Ghetuputra Komola	
2013	Saiful Islam Badal	Mrittika Maya	
2014	Saikat Nasir	Desha: The Leader	
2015	Mahfuzur Rahman Khan	Padma Patar Jol	
2016	Rashed Zaman	Aynabaji	
2017	Kamal Chandra Das	Gohin Baluchor	
2018	ZH Mintu	Postmaster 71	
2019	Sumon Sarker	No Dorai	

== Records and statistics ==
=== Multiple wins and nominations ===
The following individuals received two or more Best Cinematographer awards:

Wins	Cinematographer
10	Mahfuzur Rahman Khan
5	Anwar Hossain
2	Rafiqul Bari Chowdhury
2	Arun Roy
3	Baby Islam
3	Hasan Ahmed
2	Saiful Islam Badal
2	Shafiqul Islam Swapan
