= Mahanayak (1984 film) =

1984 Bangladeshi film

- YouTube version poster
- Directed by: Alamgir Kabir
- Written by: Alamgir Kabir
- Produced by: Bulbul Ahmed
- Starring: Bulbul Ahmed; Kajori; Julia; Rina Khan; Shawkat Akbar; Ahmed Sharif
- Cinematography: Mahfuzur Rahman Khan
- Edited by: Khorshed Alam
- Music by: Sheikh Sadi Khan
- Production company: Troyee Chritram
- Distributed by: Troyee Chritram
- Release date: 1984
- Running time: 122 mins
- Country: Bangladesh
- Language: Bengali

Mahanayak is a 1984 drama film written and directed by Alamgir Kabir. The film is based on the love story of an unemployed youth. Bulbul Ahmed played the main character. Other characters include Kajori, Julia, Rina Khan, Shawkat Akbar, Ahmed Sharif and others.

== Plot ==
Unemployed Rana is not getting a job. He stays in the same room with his friend Dildar. Dildar takes him to his master. With the permission of Ustad Kalu Khan, he started stealing people's wallets. Dildar trained him in the pickpocketing. But after he is caught, he goes to Peter Saxena. Peter invites him to join his smuggling. Rana responds and goes to see Peter in his office. But Kalu's man sees it and informs Kalu. Kalu threatens Rana. Rana conspires with Peter and calls Kalu to a garden house and kills him.

Peter introduces him to the buyers of his diamond business and sends him to Thailand. In Thailand, Peter's men welcomed him. There he met a semi-Bengali semi-Thai Linda. Linda shows him around Thailand. In the meantime, his relationship with Linda became closer. But he has to return to Bangladesh. He has to go back to Kathmandu, Nepal. There, Peter's business friend went to Joshi's hotel. When Shila, Joshi's assistant, leaked all the details of their business to him, Rana persuaded Joshi to do the same. Joshi calls Peter away from Bangladesh and at one stage of the argument, Joshi is shot by Peter. When Rana chased him, Joshi fell down the hill and died.

Rana returned to Bangladesh and proposed marriage to the receptionist Rehana. Although Rehana was reluctant at first, she agreed considering Rana's finances. But the next day he learns that Rana has actually avenged his previous insults. After the death of Kalu Khan, Dildar wants to work under him. The two were planning to make a film when singer Yasmin Khan was caught stealing her jewelry. Yasmin tells them to leave town. This is how his life continues to deceive people.

== Cast ==
- Bulbul Ahmed - Rana Rahman
- Kajori - Layla
- Julia - Yasmin Khan
- Rina Khan - Rehana, receptionist
- Sumita Chowdhury - Linda Laskar
- Suborna Pokhrel - Shila
- Shawkat Akbar - Mr. Khan
- Ahmed Sharif - Peter Saxena
- Baby Zaman - Ustad Kalu Kha
- Dildar - Dildar
- Keramat Moula - Joshi
- Jahanara Buiya - Mrs. Khan
- Utpal Barua
- Tapan Ghosh
- Aminul Haque
- Shibli Sadik - Ramu Barua
- Ashish Kumar Louho - Diamond purchaser
- Amol Bose - Diamond purchaser
- Arup Ratan Chowdhury - Mr. Fakhruddin
- Manjurul Islam Manju
- Ranu
- Maya Chowdhury
- Saifuddin Ahmed (guest appearance)
- Jahirul Haque (guest appearance)
- Sumita Devi (guest appearance)

== Music ==
Mahanayak

Soundtrack album by Runa Laila, Andrew Kishore, Subir Nandi, Haimanti Sukla, Sabina Yasmin
- Released: 1984
- Genre: Film music
- Language: Bengali

Sheikh Sadi Khan has directed the music for the film. Songs were composed by Masud Karim, Moniruzzaman Monir, Nazrul Islam Babu and Zahidul Haque. The songs is sung by Runa Laila, Andrew Kishore, Subir Nandi, Haimanti Sukla and Sabina Yasmin.

Mahanayak Soundtrack – Track listing
No.	Title	Writer(s)	Singers	Length
1.	"Tumi Chao Priya Nodi Hoye"	Nazrul Islam Babu	Haimanti Sukla, Subir Nandi	4:24
2.	"Amar E Duti Chokh Pathor To Noy"	Jahidul Haque	Subir Nandi	3:31
3.	"Ami Kare Boli Bhalo"	Moniruzzaman Monir	Runa Laila
4.	"Prithibite Prem Bole Kichu Nei"	Nazrul Islam Babu	Subir Nandi	4:41

== Assessment ==
=== Reception ===
Film critic Rahman Moti praised the creativity in directing the film and the acting of Bulbul Ahmed. According to him, love, deception, conscience all make Mahanayak a complete film.

=== Award ===
Award Title	Category	Awardee	Result
National Film Awards	Best Male Playback Singer	Subir Nandi	Won
