= Padma Meghna Jamuna =

1991 Bangladeshi film

- Bengali: পদ্মা মেঘনা যমুনা
- Directed by: Chashi Nazrul Islam
- Screenplay by: Jalaluddin Rumi
- Story by: Mohammad Mohiuddin
- Produced by: Mohammad Iqbal Hossain
- Starring: Bobita; Farooque; Champa; Bulbul Ahmed
- Cinematography: Z H Mintu
- Edited by: Khorshed Alam
- Music by: Khandaker Nurul Alam
- Distributed by: Love Film International
- Release date: 1991
- Running time: 159 minutes
- Country: Bangladesh
- Language: Bengali

Padma Meghna Jamuna (Bengali: পদ্মা মেঘনা যমুনা) is a Bangladeshi national award-winning film directed by Chashi Nazrul Islam. The film was released in 1991. The film is produced by Mohammad Iqbal Hossain, with the story written by Mohammed Mohiuddin and also screenplay and dialogue by Jalaluddin Rumi. The film stars Bobita, Farooque, Champa, Bulbul Ahmed, ATM Shamsuzzaman, and more. In 1991, this film received the National Film Award for the best film award, including other six categories.

== Cast ==
- Farooque as Hashu
- Bobita as Saju
- Champa as Maju
- Bulbul Ahmed as Ratan
- Aliraj as Ikram
- Shawkat Akbar as Bashar Ahmed
- ATM Shamsuzzaman as Boro Miyan
- Khaleda Aktar Kolpona as Kismat Banu
- Ahmed Sharif as Khayer Khan
- Rasheda as Nasiman
- Minu Rahman as Ekram's Mother
- Sushma as Ratan's mother

== Music ==
The film's music is directed by Nurul Alam Khandaker. The song was written by Nazrul Islam Babu and Mohammad Rafikuzzam. Sung by Sabina Yasmin, Andrew Kishore, Runa Laila, Kiran Chandra Roy, Shammi Akhtar, Subir Nandi, and Abida Sultana.

=== Soundtrack ===
No.	Title	Artist(s)	Artists on screen
1	Tumi Ami Emoni Duijon	Andrew Kishore	Farooque, Champa
2	Tumi Amar Bandhu	Subir Nandi	Farooque, Champa
3	Tomay Na Dakhile Chakkhu Andhar	Sabina Yasmin	Farooque, Champa
4	Dukkho Bina Hoy Na Sadhona	Andrew Kishore	Farooque, Aliraj, Champa
5	Tumi Amar Bandhu	Shammi Akhtar	Farooque, Champa
6	Ontor Jalaiya Bondhu	Andrew Kishore, Runa Laila	Farooque, Champa

== Awards ==
Award Title	Category	Awardee	Result
National Film Awards	Best Film	Tanvir Mokammel (Producer)	Won
National Film Awards	Best Film	Mohammad Iqbal Hossain	Won
National Film Awards	Best Music Director	Khandokar Nurul Alam	Won
National Film Awards	Best Lyricist	Nazrul Islam Babu	Won
National Film Awards	Best Male Playback Singer	Andrew Kishore	Won
National Film Awards	Best screenplay	Mohammad Mohiuddin	Won
National Film Awards	Best Words Customer	Mohammad Jahangir	Won

== See also ==
- Bhalobaslei Ghor Bandha Jay Na
