= Bangladesh National Film Award for Best Female Playback Singer =

Female film playback singer award

Bangladesh National Film Awards for Best Female Playback Singer
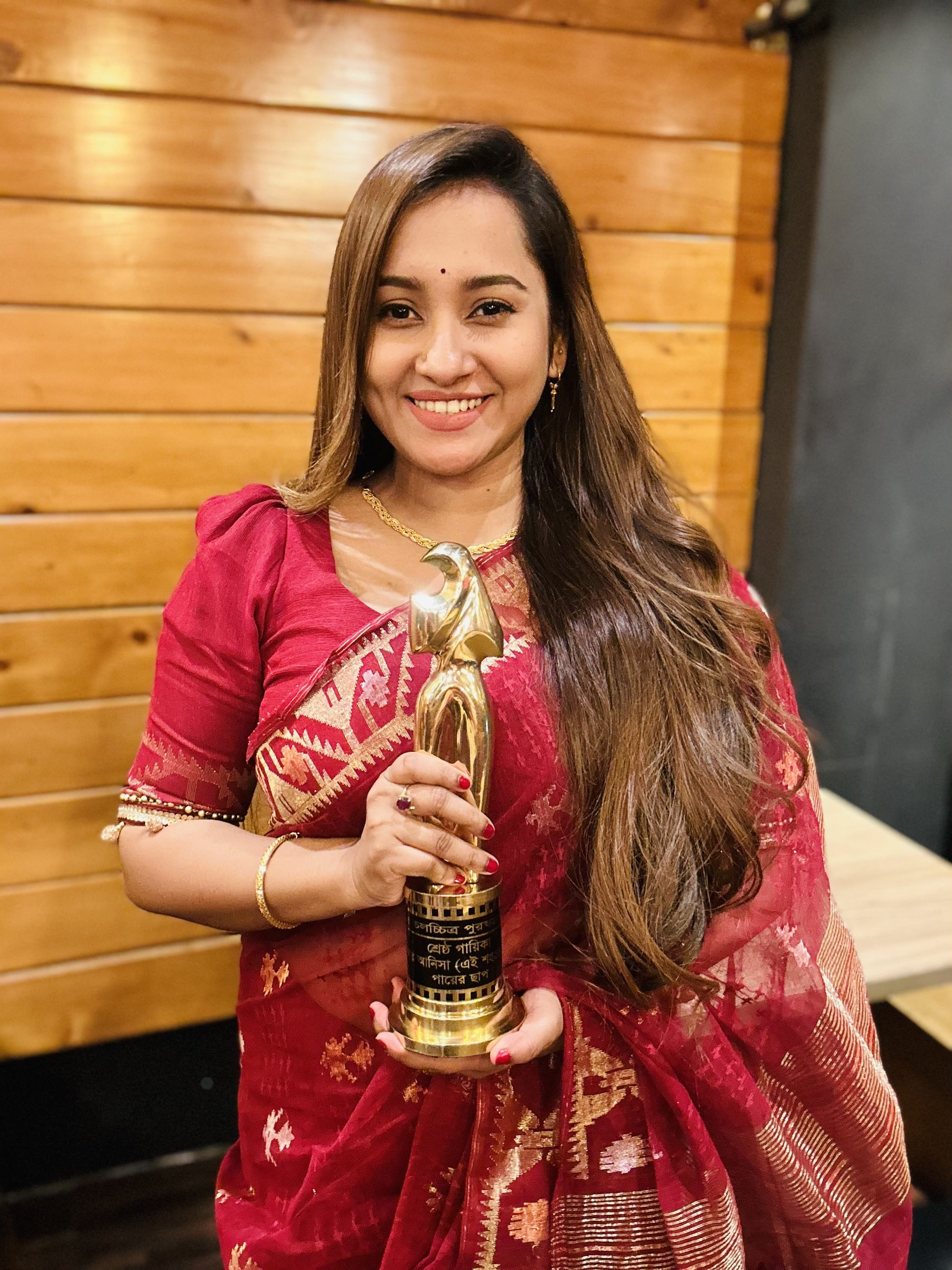
- The 2022 recipient: Atiya Anisha
- Awarded for: Excellence in cinematic achievements for Bangladeshi cinema
- Location: Dhaka
- Country: Bangladesh
- Presented by: Government of Bangladesh
- First award: 1975
- Website: moi.gov.bd

Bangladesh National Film Award for Best Female Playback Singer (Bengali: জাতীয় চলচ্চিত্র পুরস্কার) is the highest award for female film playback singers in Bangladesh.

== History ==
Bangladesh National Film Award for best female playback singer has a long history. This is the most prominent award of Bangladeshi playback singing. Since the first film Mukh O Mukhosh (1956), playback started. The ratio of releasing films was relatively very low till 1970. Upon its independence from Pakistan in 1971, the film industry witnessed a remarkable inflation of films and songs. Bangladedesh film industry saw the emergence of honouring the best artistes annually. So, National Award stated to be offered in several categories, including best female singer's category.

The first award was received by Sabina Yasmin, the reigning "Melody Queen of Bangladesh" for Sujan Sakhi. The next year, Runa Laila achieved this feat for The Rain, released in both Urdu and Bengali. It was an unusual exploitation by any singer to achieve a National Award within only two years of debut. However, Runa Laila made this possible, by earning this award in 1976 whereas she made her debut just in 1974. The next year also, Runa won this. Runa Laila made history as she was the first ever Bangladeshi female singer to defend this award successfully (earlier Lata Mangeshkar of India won National Award consecutively in 1973 and 1975, 1974 no award was given). Later on, Sabina Yasmin would make this feat a record four times. In 1978, Sabina Yasmin again earned National Award for Alangkar, she repeated in 1979 for Sundori and 1980 for Kosai. Thus she became the first and only singer to win a hat trick of National Awards. In 1981, not only in music, but also in every category was refrained from awards. In 1982, Mitali Mukherjee won. She later migrated to India and took Indian citizenship. Thus, she is the only Indian singer to win National Award of Bangladesh. In 1983, award was surrendered for the first time. Sabina Yasmin won two times in a row: 1984 and 1985. Sabina's elder sister, Nilufar Yasmin won this award in 1986. Thus, they became only Bangladeshi siblings to win National award in the same category. Sabina won again consecutive awards in 1986 and 1987. Thus, award went to the same family consecutively five times in the same family, a record to admire. The next year Runa Laila won this award and became the only singer with multiple awards except Sabina. The next year, veteran singer Shahnaz Rahmatullah claimed this award. In 1991 and 1992, Sabina consecutively won National Awards for the last time. The next two years saw Runa winning a fourth and Farida Parveen, a folk singer and non-playback singer to win award. Kanak Chapa won the awards in 1995, 2001 and 2008. She became one of the only three female singers to win multiple awards, the other two being giants as Sabina Yasmin and Runa Laila.

== List of winners ==
Year	Winner(s)	Film	Song	Ref
1975	Sabina Yasmin	Sujon Sokhi	Sob Sokhire Par Korite	
1976	Runa Laila	The Rain		
1977	Runa Laila	Jadur Banshi		
1978	Sabina Yasmin	Golapi Ekhon Traine		
1979	Sabina Yasmin	Sundori		
1980	Sabina Yasmin	Koshai		
1981	No Awards			
1982	Mitali Mukherjee	Dui Poisar Alta		
1983	Not Given			
1984	Sabina Yasmin	Chandranath		
1985	Sabina Yasmin	Premik		
1986	Nilufar Yasmin	Shuvoda		
1987	Sabina Yasmin	Rajlakshmi Srikanta		
1988	Sabina Yasmin	Dui Jibon		
1989	Runa Laila	Accident		
1990	Shahnaz Rahmatullah	Chhutir Phande	Sagorer Soikote Ke Jeno	
1991	Sabina Yasmin	Danga		
1992	Sabina Yasmin	Radha Krishna (film)		
1993	Farida Parveen	Andho Prem		
1994	Runa Laila	Antore Antore	Kalto Chhilam Bhalo	
1995	Kanak Chapa	Love Story		
1996	Not Given			
1997	Not Given			
1998	Not Given			
1999	Not Given			
2000	Sabina Yasmin	Dui Duari		
2001	Kanak Chapa	Premer Taj Mahal	Amar Premer Taj Mahal	
2002	Uma Khan	Hason Raja		
2003	Baby Nazneen	Sahoshi Manush Chai		
2004	Not Given			
2005	Sabina Yasmin	Dui Noyoner Alo		
2006	Samina Chowdhury	Rani Kuthir Baki Itihash	Amar Majhe Nei	
2007	Fahmida Nabi	Aha!	Lukochuri Lukochuri Golpo	
2008	Kanak Chapa	Ek Takar Bou		
2009	Krishnokoli & Chandana Mazumdar	Monpura	Jao Pakhi Bolo Tare	
2010	Shammi Akhtar	Bhalobaslei Ghor Bandha Jay Na		
2011	Nazmun Munir Nancy	Projapoti		
2012	Runa Laila	Tumi Asbe Bole		
2013	Runa Laila; Sabina Yasmin	Devdas		
2014	Runa Laila; Momtaz Begum	Priya Tumi Sukhi Hou; Nekabborer Mohaproyan		
2015	Priyanka Gope	Anil Bagchir Ekdin	Amar Shukh Shey	
2016	Meher Afroz Shaon	Krishnopokkho	Jodi Mon Kade Chole Esho	
2017	Momtaz Begum	Swatta		
2018	Sabina Yasmin	Putro		
2018	Akhi Alamgir	Ekti Cinemar Golpo		
2019	Momtaz Begum; Fatima Tuz Zahra Oyshee	Maya: The Lost Mother		
2020	Dilshad Nahar Kona	Bishwoshundori	Tui Ki Amar Hobi Re	
2020	Konal	Bir	Bhalobashar Manush Tumi	
2021	Chandana Mazumdar	Padmapuran	Dekhle Chhobi Pagol Hobi	
2022	Atiya Anisha	Payer Chhaap	Ei Shohorer Pothe Pothe	

== Records and statistics ==
=== Multiple wins and nominations ===
The following individuals received two or more Best Female Playback Singer awards:

Wins	Singer	Film
14	Sabina Yasmin	Sujon Sokhi (1975); Alangkar (1978); Sundori (1979); Kosai (1980); Chandranath (1984); Premik (1985); Rajlakshmi Shrikant (1987); Dui Jibon (1988); Danga (1991); Radha Krishna (1992); Dui Duari (2000); Dui Noyoner Alo (2005); Devdas (2013); Putro (2018)
7	Runa Laila	The Rain (1976); Jadur Banshi (1977); Accident (1989); Antare Antare (1994); Tumi Asbe Bole (2012); Devdas (2013); Priya Tumi Sukhi Hou (2014)
3	Kanak Chapa	Love Story (1995); Premer Taj Mahal (2001); Ek Takar Bou (2008)
3	Momtaz Begum	Nekabborer Mohaproyan (2014); Swatta (2017); Maya: The Lost Mother (2019)

== See also ==
- Bangladesh National Film Award for Best Male Playback Singer
- Bangladesh National Film Award for Best Music Director
- Bangladesh National Film Award for Best Music Composer
- Bangladesh National Film Award for Best Lyrics
