= Agun =

Vocalist and actor from Bangladesh (born 1971)

- আগুন
- Born: Khan Asifur Rahman Agoon; February 9, 1971 (age 55); Bangladesh
- Occupations: Singer, songwriter, actor
- Parents: Khan Ataur Rahman (father); Nilufar Yasmin (mother)
- Relatives: Sabina Yasmin (maternal aunt); Farida Yasmin (maternal aunt); Amir Hossain Babu (maternal uncle-in-law)
- Awards: Bachsas Awards

Khan Asifur Rahman Agoon (born 1971) known as Agun is a Bangladeshi musician. The son of actor Khan Ataur Rahman and singer Nilufar Yasmin, he is notable for songs like "Baba Bole Chhele Nam Korbe", "Amar Shopno Gulo" and "O Amar Bondhu Go".

== Career ==
In 1988, Khan Asifur Rahman Agoon started his career in music as the vocalist of a band named Sudden and released an album titled Auchena, two years later in 1990. He retired from the band and went solo in 1992. Since then, he performed as playback singer in films including Keyamot Theke Keyamot (1993) and Dui Duari (2000).

Agoon also played roles in films like Akhono Onek Raat, '71 Er Ma Jononi and television dramas including Ojana Shoikotey and Ronger Manush.

== Personal life ==
One month after his father's death in 1997, Khan eloped and married Farhana Tanna. The couple had been in love since childhood. Tanna's maternal uncle Amir Hossain Babu was married to Khan's maternal aunt, Sabina Yasmin. The couple has two children.

== Awards ==
- Bachsas Award (1997)

== Discography ==
=== Film songs ===
Year	Film	Song	Composer(s)	Songwriter(s)	Co-artist(s)
1989	Sakkhi Proman	"Churi Baaje Jhun Jhun Jhun"	Ahmed Imtiaz Bulbul		Jhumu Khan
1993	Keyamat Theke Keyamat	"Ekhon To Somoy"	Alam Khan	Moniruzzaman Monir	Runa Laila
1993	Keyamat Theke Keyamat	"O Amar Bondhu Go"	Alam Khan	Moniruzzaman Monir	Runa Laila
1993	Keyamat Theke Keyamat	"Baba Bole Chhele Naam Korbe"	Alam Khan	Moniruzzaman Monir	solo
1994	Bikkhov	"Ami Tomake Jeno"	Ahmed Imtiaz Bulbul	Ahmed Imtiaz Bulbul	Runa Laila
1994	Bikkhov	"Ekattorer Maa Jononi"	Ahmed Imtiaz Bulbul	Ahmed Imtiaz Bulbul	Runa Laila, Shakila Zafar, Khalid Hasan Milu
1994	Ontore Ontore	"O Dadi O Dadi"	Alam Khan	Moniruzzaman Monir	solo
1994	Tumi Amar	"Dekha Na Jole Ekdin"	Abu Taher	Moniruzzaman Monir	Kanak Chapa
1994	Tumi Amar	"Amar Jonmo Tomar Jonno"	Abu Taher	Moniruzzaman Monir	Samina Chowdhury
1995	Asha Bhalobasha	"Prem Preeti Aar Bhalobasha"	Abu Taher	Moniruzzaman Monir	Runa Laila
1995	Asha Bhalobasha	"Aro Aage Keni Elena"	Abu Taher	Moniruzzaman Monir	Runa Laila
1995	Dost Amar Dushmon	"Sekaleo Bondhu Chhilo"	Abu Taher	Gazi Mazharul Anwar, Moniruzzaman Monir, Jahanara Bhuiyan	Khalid Hasan Milu
1995	Banglar Commando	"Dost Dost Dost Tui Je Amar Jaan"	Ahmed Imtiaz Bulbul	Ahmed Imtiaz Bulbul	Khalid Hasan Milu
1995	Banglar Commando	"Bhalo Manush Payna Bole Bhaat"	Ahmed Imtiaz Bulbul	Ahmed Imtiaz Bulbul	Khalid Hasan Milu
1995	Banglar Commando	"Sajiye Gujiye De Amay"	Ahmed Imtiaz Bulbul	Ahmed Imtiaz Bulbul	solo
1995	Banglar Commando	"Bondhun Teen Din Por"	Ahmed Imtiaz Bulbul	Ahmed Imtiaz Bulbul	Runa Laila
1995	Ei Ghor Ei Songsar	"Sukh Sukh Sukhiya"	Alam Khan	Milton Khondokar, Mohammad Rafiquzzaman	Rizia Parvin
1995	Ei Ghor Ei Songsar	"Tetulpata Tetulpata"	Alam Khan	Milton Khondokar, Mohammad Rafiquzzaman	Rizia Parvin
1995	Ei Ghor Ei Songsar	"Amader Chhoto Nodi"	Alam Khan	Milton Khondokar, Mohammad Rafiquzzaman	Andrew Kishore, Sabina Yasmin
1995	Hridoy Amar	"Tomake Ami Rakhbo Dhore"	Azad Mintu	Liakat Ali Biswas	Samina Chowdhury
1995	Hulia	"Hajar Bochhor Por"	Ahmed Imtiaz Bulbul	Ahmed Imtiaz Bulbul	Shakila Zafar
1995	Hulia	"Tor Laal Golapi Gaal"	Ahmed Imtiaz Bulbul	Ahmed Imtiaz Bulbul	solo
1995	Kanyadan	"Khan Chachar Jaan Bacha"	Anwar Jahan Nantu	Delwar Jahan Jhontu	solo
1995	Mohamilon	"Prothome Bondona Kori"	Ahmed Imtiaz Bulbul		Shakila Zafar
1995	Muktir Songram	"Oi Elo Elo Re, Keu Bujhi Elo Re"	Ahmed Imtiaz Bulbul	Uttam Akash	Shukla Dey
1995	Muktir Songram	"Jalaiya Gela Moner Agun"	Ahmed Imtiaz Bulbul	Uttam Akash	Shukla Dey
1995	Priyo Shotru	"Ruposhi Ogo Ruposhi"	Alam Khan	Moniruzzaman Monir	Runa Laila
1995	Priyo Shotru	"Etodin Khujechhi Jare"	Alam Khan	Moniruzzaman Monir	solo
1996	Akheri Mokabela	"I Love You"	Abu Taher	Moniruzzaman Monir	Sabina Yasmin
1996	Akheri Mokabela	"Ami Bhalobashar"	Abu Taher	Moniruzzaman Monir	Sabina Yasmin
1996	Bashira	"Bhulnona Bhulbona Bondhu"	Ahmed Imtiaz Bulbul	Ahmed Imtiaz Bulbul	Shakila Zafar
1996	Bichar Hobe	"Ami Je Tomar Ke"	Alam Khan	Milton Khondokar	Sabina Yasmin
1996	Bichar Hobe	"Shokter Bhokto"	Alam Khan	Milton Khondokar	solo
1996	Chaowa Theke Paowa	"Tuntuni"	Ahmed Imtiaz Bulbul	Ahmed Imtiaz Bulbul	solo
1996	Jibon Songsar	"Ei Chokh Ei Buk"	Abu Taher	Jakir Hossain Raju	Sabina Yasmin
1996	Jibon Songsar	"Prithibite Sukh Bole"	Abu Taher	Jakir Hossain Raju	Sabina Yasmin
1996	Mayer Adhikar	"Meye Noyto Pagli Re	Ahmed Imtiaz Bulbul, Moniruzzaman Monir	Ahmed Imtiaz Bulbul	Runa Laila, chorus
1996	Nirmom	"Jonom Jonom Apon Kore"	Alam Khan	Milton Khondokar	Akhi Alamgir
1996	Nirmom	"Kukkudu Kukkudu"	Alam Khan	Milton Khondokar	Akhi Alamgir
1996	Satyer Mrityu Nei	"Ei Poth Amar"	Alauddin Ali	Masud Karim	solo
1996	Satyer Mrityu Nei	"Sukher Arek Naam"	Alauddin Ali	Masud Karim	Akhi Alamgir
1996	Shopner Prithibi	"Brishti Re Brishti"	Alauddin Ali	Moniruzzaman Monir	Sabina Yasmin
1997	Baba Keno Chakor	"Ami Bondhu Seje Thakbo"	Alauddin Ali	Mohammad Rafiquzzaman	Mitali Mukherjee
1997	Beimani	"Ogo Dushtu Chhele"	Alauddin Ali		Shakila Zafar
1997	Beimani	"Besh Korechhi Prem Korechhi"	Alauddin Ali		Shakila Zafar
1997	Beimani	"Pichhu Niyechhe Kichhu Lok"	Alauddin Ali		Runa Laila
1997	Chiroshotru	"Ore O Moner Shikari"	Abu Taher	Moniruzzaman Monir	Dolly Sayontoni
1997	Chiroshotru	"Chokh Bujile Duniya Andhar"	Abu Taher	Moniruzzaman Monir	Rizia Parvin
1997	Coolie	"Rongin Rongin Duniyate"	Alam Khan	Moniruzzaman Monir	Runa Laila, Andrew Kishore
1997	Coolie	"Janona Janona Tumi"	Alam Khan	Moniruzzaman Monir	Dolly Sayontoni
1997	Dorodi Sontan	"Priyotoma Go"	Shawkat Ali Emon	Gazi Mazharul Anwar, Jewel Mahmud, Kabir Bakul	Baby Naznin
1997	Ekhono Onek Raat	"O Amar Jonmobhumi"	Khan Ataur Rahman	Khan Ataur Rahman	solo
1997	Ekhono Onek Raat	"Amra Surjota Kere Enechhi"	Khan Ataur Rahman	Khan Ataur Rahman	solo
1997	Ke Aporadhi	"Tomra Dekho Go Asiya"	Anwar Parvez	Kabir Bakul	Rizia Parvin
1997	Khudhar Jaala	"Matir Putul Hoiya Jonmo Bhober Songsare"	N/A	Enayet Karim	Rizia Parvin
1997	Khudhar Jaala	"Tomra Ektara Bajaiyo Na"	N/A	Enayet Karim	Shakila Zafar
1997	Prem Piyasi	"Ek Jibone Amar Mitbena"	Abu Taher	Moniruzzaman Monir	Runa Laila
1997	Prem Piyasi	"Ki Je Tumi Chao"	Abu Taher	Moniruzzaman Monir	Sabina Yasmin
1997	Prem Piyasi	"Ami Konodin Robona Dure"	Abu Taher	Moniruzzaman Monir	Sabina Yasmin
1998	Ghater Majhi	"Tora Dekh Dekhre Chahiya"	Tansen Khan	Moniruzzaman Monir	chorus
1998	Kalo Choshma	"Ei Khobor Chhapaiya Dimu"	Shawkat Ali Emon	Kabir Bakul	Dolly Sayontoni
1998	Kalo Choshma	"Nacho Nacho Sob Sundorir"	Shawkat Ali Emon	Kabir Bakul	solo
1998	Matribhumi	"Amra Khuni Ashami"	Ahmed Imtiaz Bulbul	Nadeem Mahmud, Md. Rafiq and Kabir Bakul	solo
1998	Mayer Kosom	"Ami Je Tomay Koto"	Ahmed Imtiaz Bulbul	Ahmed Imtiaz Bulbul	Shakila Zafar
1998	Mayer Kosom	"Chun Lagaiya Khaiyo"	Ahmed Imtiaz Bulbul	Ahmed Imtiaz Bulbul	solo
1998	Mukti Chai	"Amra Hukumer Golam"	Ahmed Imtiaz Bulbul	Ahmed Imtiaz Bulbul	solo
1998	Mukti Chai	"Aajke Sobai Bolo Chichinf Fak"	Ahmed Imtiaz Bulbul	Ahmed Imtiaz Bulbul	Shakila Zafar
1998	Ochol Poisha	"Ek Polok Dekhe Tomay"	Alauddin Ali	Mohammad Rafiquzzaman	Runa Laila
1998	Ochol Poisha	"Eto Bhalobasha Dile"	Alauddin Ali	Mohammad Rafiquzzaman	Runa Laila
1998	Ogni Sakkhi	"Sara Duniya Tomar Moton"			Dolly Sayontoni
1998	Ogni Sakkhi	"Tumi Amar Premer Sowdagor"			Dolly Sayontoni
1998	Ranga Bou	"Sundori Go Tor Jeno"	Ahmed Imtiaz Bulbul	Ahmed Imtiaz Bulbul	Shakila Zafar
1998	Ranga Bou	"Gorom Tele"	Ahmed Imtiaz Bulbul	Ahmed Imtiaz Bulbul	Dolly Sayontoni
1998	Ruti	"Batti Nibhlo Andhar Hoilo"	Shawkat Ali Emon	Enayet Karim	Shakila Zafar
1998	Ruti	"Amar Naam Aam Gachh"	Shawkat Ali Emon	Enayet Karim	Shanta Srabonti
1998	Teji	"Khaiche Amay Khaiche Re"	Ahmed Imtiaz Bulbul	Ahmed Imtiaz Bulbul	N/A
1998	Teji	"Ghor Naire Bari Naire"	Ahmed Imtiaz Bulbul	Ahmed Imtiaz Bulbul	N/A
1998	Teji	"O Tor Bape Raji"	Ahmed Imtiaz Bulbul	Ahmed Imtiaz Bulbul	Roxy
1998	Tejjo Putro	"Sundori O Sundori Tumi Shopner Rajkumari"	Ali Hossain	Mohammad Moniruzzaman	solo
1998	Tejjo Putro	"Abujh Monta Bojhena"	Ali Hossain	Mohammad Moniruzzaman	Kanak Chapa
1999	Bhoyongkor Bishu	"Jole Agun Bukete"	Shawkat Ali Emon	Kabir Bakul	solo
1999	Jobordokhol	"Swadhinata Amar Swadhinata"	Ahmed Imtiaz Bulbul		Shakila Zafar, Khalid Hasan Milu
1999	Lonkakando	N/A	Alam Khan	Moniruzzaman Monir	N/A
1999	Love in Bangkok	"Bangkok Shohor Aisha"	Ahmed Imtiaz Bulbul		Shakila Zafar
1999	Parle Thekao	"Jotodin Ei Dehe Thakbe Dom"	Abu Taher	Moniruzzaman Monir, Jahanara Bhuiyan	Runa Laila
1999	Parle Thekao	"Badsha Re Badshah, Ami Aaj Badshah"	Abu Taher	Moniruzzaman Monir, Jahanara Bhuiyan	Dolly Sayontoni
1999	Miss Diana	"Sona Bondhu Tui Amare"	Alauddin Ali		Baby Naznin
2000	Bishakto Nagin	"Piriti Jole Dhoirachhe"	Ahmed Imtiaz Bulbul		Rizia Parvin
2000	Giringibaj	"Golemale Golemale Pirit Korona"	Abid Rony	N/A	chorus
2000	Karishma	"Dure Gele Bukta"	Alauddin Ali	Gazi Mazharul Anwar, Mohammad Rafiquzzaman, Moniruzzaman Monir	Baby Naznin
2000	Karishma	"Ke Tumi Janina"	Alauddin Ali	Gazi Mazharul Anwar, Mohammad Rafiquzzaman, Moniruzzaman Monir	Kanak Chapa
2000	Kukkhato Khuni	"Kol-e Tip Diley Pani Pore"	Shawkat Ali Emon	Kabir Bakul	solo
2000	Sabdhan	"Duita Pagli Paichhe"	Ahmed Imtiaz Bulbul		solo
2000	Tero Panda Ek Gunda	"Tero Panda, Ek Gunda"	Ahmed Imtiaz Bulbul	Ahmed Imtiaz Bulbul	chorus
2000	Tero Panda Ek Gunda	"Saban Doila Dimu"	Ahmed Imtiaz Bulbul	Ahmed Imtiaz Bulbul	solo
2000	Uttarer Khep	"Ami Boro Eka Eka"	Sheikh Sadi Khan		solo
2001	Dushmon Dorodi	"Biyar Sajoni Sajo"	Ahmed Imtiaz Bulbul		chorus
2001	E Badhon Jabena Chhire	"O Babago Baba"	Abu Taher		solo
2001	E Badhon Jabena Chhire	"Sohage Adore Rekhechho Bedhe"	Abu Taher		solo
2001	Gono Dushmon	"Ek Duniya Chay Amare"	Ahmed Imtiaz Bulbul	Ahmed Imtiaz Bulbul	Runa Laila
2001	Gono Dushmon	"Amar Bilai Amare Koy"	Ahmed Imtiaz Bulbul	Ahmed Imtiaz Bulbul	Anima D'Costa
2001	Kothin Shasti	"Engine Ta Ektu Gorom"	Ali Akram Shuvo	Kabir Bakul	solo
2001	Kothin Shasti	"Na Na Chhuiyona"	Ali Akram Shuvo	Kabir Bakul	Shakila Zafar
2001	Mejaj Gorom	"Norom Norom Gaal Dekhe"	Emon Saha		Baby Naznin
2001	Moron Niye Khela	"Bajere Baje Dhol Re"	Alauddin Ali		Bipasha
2001	Moron Niye Khela	"Modhur Lobhe Oli Re"	Alauddin Ali		Bipasha
2001	Thekao Mastan	"Dhal Tora Dhal"	Ali Akram Shuvo	Moniruzzaman Monir	solo
2002	Boba Khuni	"Chokhero Majhe Ki Re"	Ali Akram Shuvo	Moniruzzaman Monir, Jahanara Bhuiyan	Runa Laila
2002	Boba Khuni	"Konta Dhoira Konta Chhari"	Ali Akram Shuvo	Moniruzzaman Monir, Jahanara Bhuiyan	Baby Naznin
2002	Oder Dhor	"Jala Amar Jala Re"	Alauddin Ali	Moniruzzaman Monir, Masum Babul	Rizia Parvin
2003	Chai Khomota	"Chai Khomota"	Alam Khan	Obaydul Goni Chondon	solo
2003	Chai Khomota	"Chai Khomota" (bit.)	Alam Khan	Obaydul Goni Chondon	solo
2005	Khude Joddha	"Ami Je Tomar"	Ali Akram Shuvo		Anima D'Costa
2005	Takar Nesha	"Turaru, Turaru, Prem Kahini Holo Shuru"	Shawkat Ali Emon		Dolly Sayontoni
2008	Ek Takar Bou	"Ekta Nouka Kine Debo"	Shawkat Ali Emon	Kabir Bakul	solo
2009	Bolona Kobul	"Mor Naam Abul"	Shawkat Ali Emon	N/A	Mim
2009	Jonmo Tomar Jonno	"Piriti Dimu Jodi Tui Chas"			Momtaz
2010	5 Takar Prem	"Tumi Shunno Akashe"	Shawkat Ali Emon	Kabir Bakul	solo
2010	5 Takar Prem	"Holdi Baato Mehndi Baato"	Shawkat Ali Emon	Kabir Bakul	Baby Naznin
2012	Ek Mon Ek Pran	"Tomra Thako Upor Tolay"	Shawkat Ali Emon	Kabir Bakul	Andrew Kishore
N/A	Jobab De	"Bhalobeshe Tomake Diyechi To Mon"			N/A
N/A	Matir Putul	"Monta Tiktik Kore"			Rizia Parvin
N/A	Tumi Je Amar	"Asha Hoye Chhile Tumi"	Alam Khan	Moniruzzaman Monir	Kanak Chapa
N/A	Tumi Je Amar	"Oi Dhola Chherita Amar"	Alam Khan	Moniruzzaman Monir	solo
N/A	Sobuj Coat Kalo Choshma	"Prithibir Shuru Theke Prem Chhilo"			Shakila Zafar
N/A	Sobuj Coat Kalo Choshma	"O Priyo Tumi Kachhe Ese Bolo"			Shakila Zafar
N/A	Teji Sontan	"Ei Modhur Raate Tomar Sathe"	Abu Taher	Moniruzzaman Monir, Jahanara Bhuiyan	Baby Naznin
N/A	Teji Sontan	"Gange Aisachhe Noya Paani"	Abu Taher	Moniruzzaman Monir, Jahanara Bhuiyan	Dolly Sayontoni
