= List of Bangladeshi films of 1991 =

A list of Bangladeshi films released in 1991.

== Releases ==
Title	Director	Cast	Genre	Notes	Ref.
Achena	Shibli Sadik	Alamgir, Shabana, Ilias Kanchan, Champa, Ali Raz, Aruna Biswas	Drama		
Chadni	Ehtesham				
Danga	Kazi Hayat	Manna, Suchorita, Rajeeb, Miju Ahmed, Dildar	Action		
Kashem Malar Prem	Mostafa Anwar	Manna, Champa, Anwar Hossain, Sawkat Akbar, Prabir Mitra, Nasir Khan, Dildar	Romance		
Padma Meghna Jamuna	Chashi Nazrul Islam	Faruq, Bobita, Champa, Ali Raz, Ahmed Sharif, Shawkat Akbar, ATM Shamsuzzaman	Drama		
Pita Mata Santan	A J Mintu	Alamgir, Shabana, Asad, Imran, Anwar Hossain, Golam Mustafa, Dildar	Drama		
Streer Paona	Sheikh Nazrul Islam	Alamgir, Shabana, Ilias Kanchan, Diti, Nutan, Rajeeb, Rowshan Jamil	Drama, Romance		
Shantona		Shabana, Alamgir, Anwar Hossain, Golam Mustafa,	Drama		
Smriti Ekattor - Remembrance of ’71	Tanvir Mokammel		Documentary	A documentary on the massacre on Bengalis in 1971.	

== See also ==
- 1991 in Bangladesh
