= Shahidullah Dulal =

- শহিদুল্লাহ দুলাল
- Occupation: Cinematographer
- Notable work: Shuvoda; Chhutir Ghonta
- Awards: National Film Awards (1st times)

Shahidullah Dulal is a Bangladeshi Cinematographer and cameraman. He won the Bangladesh National Film Award for Best Cinematography for the film Hason Raja (2002).

== Selected films ==
- Harano Sur - 1987
- Khotipuron - 1989
- Ononto Bhalobasa - 1999
- Juari - 2001
- Hason Raja - 2002

== Awards and nominations ==
National Film Awards

Year	Award	Category	Film	Result
2002	National Film Award	Best Cinematography	Hason Raja	Won
