= Mahfuzur Rahman Khan =

Bangladeshi cinematographer (1949 - 2019)

- মাহফুজুর রহমান খান
- Born: 10 May 1949; Bangladesh
- Died: 6 December 2019 (aged 70)
- Occupation: Cinematographer

Mahfuzur Rahman Khan, aka, Mahfoozur Rahman Khan (10 May 1949 – 6 December 2019), was a Bangladeshi cinematographer having received the Bangladesh National Film Award for Best Cinematography a record breaking ten times during his career. Though he was also a film director, actor and producer, he was most remembered for working behind the camera in films directed by Humayun Ahmed and other film makers including Shibli Sadik and Alamgir Kumkum.

== Family ==
Khan was born 10 May 1949 to the family of Hakim Habib Ur Rahman Road in Old Dhaka. He was the eldest of six brothers and three sisters. From a young age Mahfouz was drawn to photography, very much inspired by the photographs his father took with his 120 film box camera. Before he was sent to boarding school at Dhaka Residential Model College, Mahfouz inherited his father's camera.

He was husband to Dr Nirafat Alam Shipra who made major contributions in her field of working with deaf children in education. She died from cancer in 2001.

== Career ==
After passing his matric his wish was to study photography abroad but was advised to work for six months to a year first to gain experience. Taking this advice he began working as an assistant film director in 1966. In 1972 he started his professional work as a cinematographer for the movie Kaccher Gore.

His teacher was cinematographer Abdul Latif Bachchu. From the outset he worked with cinematographers like Shadon Roy, Baby Islam, Abdul Salam, Abzal Chowdury, Arun Roy, and Rafiqul Bari Chowdhury.

In 1985 Mahfouz received his first national award for Obhijan. He would receive nine more national awards after this. Four of these were films directed by writer and director Humayun Ahmed. He spoke highly of working with Ahmed. Later he also became involved in producing films and played an important role in nurturing the next generation of cinematographers. Mahfouz Ur Rahman worked as a cinematographer for over 40 years, working on over 200 films.

=== Acting ===
His acting debut was in Alamgir Kumkum's Liberation War film Amar Jonmobhumi (1973). He also played lead roles in the films Jalader Darbar, Dabi (1978), Alo Chhaya and Cholo Ghor Badhi.

== Awards ==
He won the Bangladesh National Film award for Best Cinematography a record ten times for the films Obhijan (1984), Sohojatri (1987), Poka Makorer Ghor Bosoti (1996), Srabon Megher Din (1999), Dui Duari (2000), Hajar Bachhor Dhore (2005), Amar Ache Jol (2008), Ghetuputra Komola (2012) and Padma Patar Jol (2015).

- Cultural Reporters' Association Award (2003)
- Bangladesh Cholochitra Sangbadik Samity (eight times)
- Meril Protom Alo award

== Death ==
Mahfuzur Rahman Khan died on 6 December 2019 at the age of 70. He had been suffering from diabetes and lung disease for a long time. Prime Minister Sheikh Hasina expressed deep shock and sorrow at the death.
