= Nalish =

Bangladeshi film

- Poster
- Directed by: Mumtaz Ali
- Screenplay by: Mumtaz Ali
- Starring: Shabana; Ujjal; Ilyas Kanchan; Suchorita; Adil
- Cinematography: Shafiqul Islam Swapon
- Music by: Ali Hossain
- Release date: 10 September 1982
- Country: Bangladesh
- Language: Bengali

Nalish is a 1982 Bangladeshi film starring Shabana and Ilyas Kanchan in the lead roles. This film was among a series of successful films Ujjal appeared under the direction of Mumtaz Ali. The film's cinematographer Shafiqul Islam Swapan earned Bangladesh National Film Award for Best Cinematography.

== Cast ==
- Shabana
- Ujjal
- Ilyas Kanchan
- Suchorita
- Adil

== Music ==
All songs were composed by Ali Hossain and lyrics were written by Gazi Mazharul Anwar.

1. "Khodar Ghore Nalish Korte" (by Rathindranath Roy) — 5:08
2. "Sukher Ei Moron Fashi" (by Sabina Yasmin)

== Awards and nominations ==
National Film Awards

Year	Award	Category	Nominee	Result
1982	National Film Award	Best Cinematography	Shafiqul Islam Swapan	Won
