= Rupali Saikate =

Bangladeshi film

- Poster
- Directed by: Alamgir Kabir
- Written by: Alamgir Kabir
- Starring: Bulbul Ahmed; Jayshree Kabir; Anwar Hossain; Sharmilee Ahmed; Nutan; Anjana Sultana; Rozi Samad; Ujjal
- Release date: 1979
- Country: Bangladesh
- Language: Bengali

Rupali Saikate (Bengali: রূপালী সৈকতে; English: The Silver Beach) is a 1979 Bangladeshi film directed by Alamgir Kabir The film stars Bulbul Ahmed, Jayshree Kabir and Sharmili Ahmed.

== Cast ==
- Bulbul Ahmed
- Jayshree Kabir
- Anwar Hossain
- Sharmilee Ahmed
- Nutan
- Anjana Sultana
- Rozi Samad
- Ujjal

== Awards ==
- Winner: Bachsas Award for Best Film (1979)
