= Kajori =

Bangladeshi film actress

- Occupation: Actress

Kajori is a Bangladeshi film actress.

== Biography ==
Kajori acted in Mohanayok in 1984 where her co-star was Bulbul Ahmed This film won National Film Award in one category. She also acted in Noyoner Alo in 1984 where her co-star was Zafar Iqbal. This film won National Film Award in one category too.

== Selected filmography ==
- Mahanayak
- Noyoner Alo
- Kajol Lota
- Fuleshwari
