= Shesh Uttar =

Bangladeshi film

- Directed by: Azizur Rahman
- Screenplay by: Ahmed Zaman Chowdhury
- Produced by: Ashok Ghosh
- Starring: Shabana; Bulbul Ahmed; Ilias Kanchan
- Music by: Robin Ghosh; Ahmed Zaman Chowdhury (lyrics)
- Release date: 1980
- Country: Bangladesh
- Language: Bengali

Kanan Devi singing "Ami Banaphul Go"
From the 1942 film Shesh Uttar

Shesh Uttar (Bengali: শেষ উত্তর) is a 1980 Bangladeshi film starring Bulbul Ahmed and Shabana opposite him. Bulbul bagged Bangladesh National Film Award for Best Actor. It also stars Ilias Kanchan. It was written by Ahmed Zaman Chowdhury. The film was produced by Ashok Ghosh and the music score was composed by his older brother Robin Ghosh.

== Soundtrack ==
No	Song title	Singer(s)	Duration
1	"Amar Mami"	Runa Laila	
2	"Dohai Lage Poti Rag Korona"	Runa Laila	
3	N/A	Subir Nandi	
4	N/A	Khurshid Alam	

== Awards ==
6th Bangladesh National Film Awards

- Best Actor - Bulbul Ahmed
