= Bablu =

Bablu (Bengali: বাবলু) is a Bengali masculine daak naam. It may refer to:

- Abu Hena Bablu (fl. 1976–1997), Bangladeshi cinematographer
- Asaduzzaman Bablu (born 1986), Bangladeshi politician
- Assaduzzaman Bablu (born 1996), Bangladeshi footballer
- Hasanuzzaman Khan Bablu (born 1955), Bangladeshi footballer and coach
- Nurul Islam Bablu (born 1996), Bangladeshi actor
- Rezaul Karim Bablu (born 1962), Bangladeshi politician
- Ziauddin Ahmed Bablu (1954–2021), Bangladeshi politician, former general secretary of the Jatiya Party
