= Sadhan Roy =

Bangladeshi cinematographer and actor

- সাধন রায়
- Born: 5 November 1914; Chittagong, Bengal Presidency, British India
- Died: 21 January 1988 (aged 73)
- Occupation: Cinematographer
- Years active: 1940–1986
- Notable work: Shuvoda; Chhutir Ghonta

Sadhan Roy (5 November 1914 – 21 January 1988) was a Bangladeshi cinematographer and actor. He won the Bangladesh National Film Award for Best Cinematography for the film Shuvoda (1986).

== Career ==
Sadhan Roy was born on 5 November 1914 in Nalapara, Chittagong City in the then British India. In his youth, he was an associate of revolutionary Surya Sen. On 18 April 1930, the British police arrested him for looting the arsenal, destroying the telephone office, occupying the police line, disrupting the British administration, and injuring and killing 70-80 soldiers in the frontal battle of the British soldiers under the leadership of Sen. Roy's uncle, Khirod Chandra, then MLA of Chittagong, released him on bail and sent him to Kolkata. Roy was introduced to the film industry in Kolkata through Pramathesh Barua and worked on the film Shapmukti as his assistant cameraman. He worked with him in films including Shesh Uttar, Jabaab, Mayer Pran, and Uttarayan. Roy also worked in the film Asha, directed by Ranjit Sen.

In 1957, Roy came to Dhaka and started working on A. J. Kardar's Jago Hua Savera as an assistant photographer to London photographer Wanter Lasalle. After that, he worked on several films including Je Nadi Moru Pothe, Tomar Amar, Vishkanya, Poyse, Godhuli's Love, Satrang, Poonam Ki Raat, Nayika, Yeh Bhi Ek Kahani, Jolchhobi, Raja Elo Sharhar, Aparajeyo, Jina Bhi Mushkil, Jungli Phool, Parashmani, Aporichita, Alor Pipasa, and Antaranga.

During the Bangladesh Liberation War in 1971, Roy came into contact with Zahir Raihan in Agartala and worked briefly with him. After the independence, he returned to Bangladesh and worked on the Liberation War-based film Raktakta Bangla, Etim, Nader Chand, Ke Tumi, Jantar-Mantar, Dur Theke Kacche, Puraskar, Mimansa, Chhutir Ghonta, Ujan Bhati, Bashundhara, Torulata, Saheb, Jibon Elo Phire, Shubhratri, Ami Kar, Chandranath, Shuvoda, and Rangin Roopban.

Roy worked with his close friend Fazle Hossain on the films The Rain, Adalat, Beddyin, Raja Badsha, Smriti Tumi Bedona, Kankar, Abhijyog, Darling, Bara Ma and Laal Mem Shaheb.

== Personal life ==
Roy married Bakul Roy in May 1947. They had two daughters, Shukla (aged 76) and Krishna (aged 74).

After Roy's death on 21 January 1988, Chashi Nazrul Islam performed the funeral rites as per his wishes.

In the late 1980s, a short film Godhuli was made on the life of Roy. PA Kajol made this 32-minute 15-second short film which won the National Film Award for Best Short Film in 1991.

== Works ==
- Shapmukti (1940)
- The River (1951)
- Grihapravesh (1954)
- Pathetic Fallacy (1958)
- Jago Hua Savera (1959)
- Je Nodi Morupothay (1961)
- Paisay (1964)
- Poonam Ki Raat (1966)
- Agun Niye Khela (1967)
- Bhanumoti (1969)
- Dur Theke Kachhe (1974)
- The Rain (1976)
- Matir Maya (1976)
- Chhutir Ghonta (1980)
- Jontor Montor (1982)
- Chandranath (1984)
- Shuvoda (1986)

== Awards ==
- Bangladesh National Film Award for Best Cinematography (1986)
- Bachsas Award
- Directors Association Award
- Sequence Award
- Hiralal Sen Memorial Sangsad Medal
