= Amir Hossain Babu =

Bangladeshi dancer and choreographer

- আমির হোসেন বাবু
- Born: 28 March 1952; Feni District, East Bengal, Dominion of Pakistan
- Died: 9 July 2003 (aged 51); Dhaka, Bangladesh
- Education: Dhaka College (BA)
- Occupations: Dancer and choreographer
- Spouse: Sabina Yasmin (divorced)
- Children: Rafi Hossain Srabon
- Awards: Bangladesh National Film Award for Best Choreography

Amir Hossain Babu (28 March 1952 – 9 July 2003) was a Bangladeshi dancer, choreographer and actor. He earned Bangladesh National Film Award for Best Choreography two times for his contribution in the films Beporoya (1992) and Meghla Akash (2001).

== Background ==
Amir Hossain Babu was born on 28 March 1952 in Feni District in the then East Bengal. His father, Md Delawar Hossain, worked at WASA. Babu had three younger sisters Dolly, Shelly and Lily. He completed his SSC from BAF Shaheen College Dhaka and BA from Dhaka College.

== Career ==
Babu's first choreographed film Doyal Murshid was released in 1973.

Babu also acted in several films including Abar Tora Manush Ho, Badsha, Jadur Bashi and Premik.

Actor Ferdous Ahmed was discovered by Babu . In 1997, following the death of Salman Shah, he scheduled to make a dance based film named Nach Moyuri Nach. Since, Shah was dead untimely, he needed a new lead actor. So, he auditioned for a new hero and chose Ahmed for the role. The shooting began initially, but the film was shelved.

== Personal life and death ==
Babu was married to singer Sabina Yasmin but was divorced before his death. Together they had a son, Rafi Hossain Srabon.

Babu died on 9 July 2003 in Dhaka, at the age of 51.

== Filmography ==
- Ovagi (1975)
- Gunda (1976)
- Dost Dushman (1977)
- Alankar (1978)
- Aradhona (1979)
- Jibon Nouka (1981)
- Lal Kajal (1982)
- Nantu Ghotok (1982)
- Rajanigandha (1982)
- Najma (1983)
- The Hunger (1984)
- Noyoner Alo (1984)
- Princess Tina Khan (1984)
- Awara (1985)
- Miss Lolita (1985)
- Mohanayok (1985)
- Lalu Mastan (1987)
- Rajlakshmi Srikanta (1987)
- Surrender (1987)
- Swami Stree (1987)
- Bheja Chokh (1988)
- Jibon Dhara (1988)
- Jogajog (1988)
- Bhaijaan (1989)
- Byathar Daan (1989)
- Ranga Bhabi (1989)
- Satya Mithya (1989)
- Ankhi Milon (1990)
- Dolna (1990)
- Danga (1991)
- Padma Meghna Jamuna (1991)
- Ochena (1991)
- Top Rangbaaz (1991)
- Beporoa (1992)
- Bondhu Amar (1992)
- Chorer Bou (1992)
- Ondho Bishwas (1992)
- Abujh Sontan (1993)
- Keyamot Theke Keyamot (1993)
- Moushumi (produced and choreographed) (1993)
- Ondho Prem (1993)
- Bikkhov (1994)
- Golapi Ekhon Dhakai (1994)
- Sujon Sokhi (1994)
- Papi Shatru (1995)
- Moumachi (1996)
- Nirmom (1996)
- Tomake Chai (1996)
- Anondo Osru (1997)
- Baba Keno Chakor (1997)
- Biyer Phul (1999)
- Ononto Bhalobasa (1999)
- Meghla Akash (2001)
- Hason Raja (2002)
