= MA Mobin =

Bangladesi cinematographer & photographer

- এম এ মবিন
- Born: MA Mobin
- Died: 25 July 2016 (aged 75); Dhaka, Bangladesh
- Occupations: Cinematographer & Photographer
- Years active: 1973–Present
- Notable work: Simana Periye; Rajlakshmi Srikanta; Dukhai
- Awards: National Film Awards (1st time)

MA Mobin is a Bangladeshi cinematographer and photographer. In 1977, he won the Bangladesh National Film Award for Best Cinematography for the film Simana Periye.

== Selected films ==
- Dhire Bohe Meghna - 1973
- Bichar - 1974
- Shimana Periye - 1977
- Janani - 1977
- Shurjokonna - 1977
- Lal Shobujer Pala - 1981
- Devdas - 1982
- Rajlakshmi Srikanta 1987
- Shonkhonil Karagar - 1992
- Dipu Number Two 1996
- Dukhai - 1997

== Awards and nominations ==
National Film Awards

Year	Award	Category	Film	Result
1977	National Film Award	Best Cinematography	Simana Periye	Won
