= Chhutir Ghonta =

Bangladeshi drama film

- VCD Poster
- Bengali: ছুটির ঘন্টা
- Directed by: Azizur Rahman
- Written by: Mohammad Rafiquzzaman; Azizur Rahman
- Screenplay by: Azizur Rahman
- Story by: Mohammad Rafiquzzaman
- Produced by: Ramala Shaha
- Starring: Abdur Razzak; Shabana; Sujata; Master Sumon
- Cinematography: Sadhan Roy
- Edited by: Nurun Nabi
- Music by: Satya Shaha
- Distributed by: Swaralipi Banichitra
- Release date: May 2, 1980
- Running time: 150 minutes
- Country: Bangladesh
- Language: Bengali
- Box office: ৳4 crore (US$330,000)

Chhutir Ghonta (transl. When the bell rang') is a 1980 Bangladeshi drama film written and directed by Azizur Rahman. It stars Razzak, Shabana, Sujata and Master Sumon in the lead.

It is based on the true story of a twelve-year-old school boy named Khokon in Bangladesh, who starved to death after the washroom he was in was mistakenly closed by the caretaker the day before the Muslim vacation Eid-ul-Azha started. The boy was found dead after the vacation was over.

== Plot ==
The film opens in a mental asylum. At the beginning of the day, a man starts ringing a bell, which infuriates one of the patients, Abbas Mia. After he gets injured by a guard for yelling in an effort to stop the ringing, he gets healed by a doctor who is new to the asylum, and he asks him why he yells every time the bell rings. After which, Abbas Mia starts to tell him a story.

Many years ago, when Abbas Mia was the caretaker of Nilgiri Multipurpose High School, there was a boy named Khokon. While Khokon's mother loves her son as she mourns over the loss of her husband. Khokon is generally loved by the students, teachers, the pickle seller and especially Abbas Mia. Since the Muslim vacation Eid-ul-Azha is approaching, Khokon plans to meet his maternal grandfather. However, his maternal grandfather arrives early, and he, Khokon, and his mother go shopping. Khokon later sees an advertisement for a magic show and asks his mother if he can go and see it, and it goes well.

At the end of the school day, when Eid al Adha holidays begin, Khokon waits for his car to pick him up, but since it arrives late, he goes to the washroom, but accidentally gets locked in by Abbas Mia. Initially thinking that his friends had played some sort of prank on him, Khokon eventually realizes that he has been accidentally locked in the washroom and that everyone has already left the school. Meanwhile, at home, Khokon's mother is notified that Khokon hasn't returned from school, and, becoming scared about this, Khokon's mother checks Khokon's friend's house, and notifies Abbas Mia about this, and so they check more places, including the hospital, but aren't able to find Khokon.

Khokon's mother, alongside Abbas Mia, notifies the police, and an announcement is made on the speakers of a car, but Khokon knows that as long as no one checks the school or hears his screams, he won't be found. He eventually starts drinking water from the tap and eats the lunch his mother made for him earlier; he even writes messages on the walls of the bathroom in case he dies before being saved.

Eventually, Khokon finds a small window on the very high of the washroom, and although he tries very hard to get up, he unfortunately falls, injuring himself. But then Khokon has an idea, he takes out his notebook and writes a letter down explaining that he's trapped in the washroom, and then crumples the note up, and throws it out the window, hoping that someone will find the letter and save Khokon.

Days later, Khokon tries to drink the water from the tap, but the water has seemingly run out. He then finds some water above a toilet and attempts to get it, but accidentally flushes it down the toilet. Meanwhile, at home, Khokon's mother has stopped eating over the grief of his son being lost. In a weird coincidence, Abbas Mia dreams about Khokon being locked in the school bathroom, and so he wakes up and dashes to the school's principal and asks for the keys. However, when he tells the principal why he needs them, the principal tells him that he only dreamed of this because he loved the boy so much.

Khokon becomes tired of waiting and starts believing that no one actually cares enough for him to be found, but just then, he hears the sound of an announcement, stating that the Eid prayers the next day will be held at the school. Khokon realizes this is an opportunity for him to be heard. But unfortunately, a thunderstorm occurs, and so another announcement is made, stating that the Eid prayers will instead be held at the Mosque. Khokon hears this and laughs, knowing that he has lost all hope. Khokon's mother even faints in the house since she hasn't eaten anything for the past couple of days.

On the day school is back in session, Abbas Mia and Anguri ma'am enter the school to unlock and clean things up, as the Eid Al Adha holiday has ended. While cleaning the bathroom, Anguri ma'am notices Khokon's dead body, screams in agony, which alerts the students, the principal, the staff, and even Abbas Mia. He enters the washroom and sees Khokon's dead body, and then starts reading the stuff Khokon wrote on the wall, which makes him realize he is to blame for the death of Khokon. Khokon's mother is notified by someone about Khokon being found, but is later revealed to her that Khokon is dead. Abbas Mia, who has gone mad over all this, takes the blame for the death of Khokon and gets arrested. Khokon's mother, carrying his dead son, walks out of the school, along with all the other staff, students, and the police.

Back in the mental asylum, Abbas Mia finishes his story by saying that while everyone got a break, he didn't. He then asks when his break will occur. The doctor behind him, who heard his entire story, looks down in pity, and the film ends.

== Cast ==
- Razzaq as Abbas Mia the school caretaker
- Shabana as Anguri ma'am, the school maid
- Sujata as Begum Shahiba, the mother of Khokon
- Master Sumon as Asaduzzaman Khokon, nicknamed "Khokon Shaheb" by Abbas Mia
- Shawkat Akbar as Khokon's maternal grandfather
- ATM Shamsuzzaman as the school teacher
- Fazlur Rahman
- Kayes
- Dr. Arup Ratan Choudhury
- Ponkoj Boiddo
- Akhtar Hossain
- Rabiul as a pickle seller
- Biswajit Chowdhury
- Bikash
- Poran Bishwas
- Pulin Mitra
- Waheeda Rehman
- Sushma
- Sarbbari
- Baby
- Dolly
- Nayaran Chakraborty
- Jahangir
- Huda
- Sirajul Islam Montu
- Bulbul Wazed
- Nazrul
- Awal
- Akhtar
- Master Rana
- Robert
- Piklu
- Kollol
- Master Toy
- Milton
- Group of students
- Jewel Aice (Special guest star) as himself
- Khan Ataur Rahman as the school principal

== Music ==
The film's music is composed and conducted by Satya Shaha and the lyrics are written by Mohammad Rafiquzzaman.

=== Track listing ===
No.	Title	Playback Singer(s)	Length
1.	"Ekdin Chuti Hobe Onek Dure Jabo"	Sabina Yasmin	04:05
2.	"Maiya Manush Ken Je Ailo Duniyay"	Khandokar Faruque Ahmed, Shammi Akhtar	03:39
3.	"Achar Khaile Bichar Hobe"	Sabina Yasmin	03:50
4.	"Amader Deshta Shopnopuri"	Abida Sultana	03:49
