= ZH Mintu =

Bangladeshi Cinematographer

- জেডএইচ মিন্টু
- Occupation: Cinematographer
- Years active: 1986–2022
- Notable work: Postmaster 71
- Awards: National Film Awards (1st time)

ZH Mintu (died 10 March 2023) was a Bangladeshi cinematographer. He won the Bangladesh National Film Award for Best Cinematography for the film Postmaster 71 (2018).

== Filmography ==
- Kartooz - 2015
- Brihonnola - 2014
- Nijhum Oronney - 2010
- Golapi Ekhon Bilatey - 2010
- Ebadat - 2009
- Kopal - 2007
- Ayna - 2006
- Kal Shokale - 2005
- Kheya Ghater Majhi - 2003
- Shundori Bodhu
- Uttarer Khep
- Sotter Shongram
- Hangor Nodi Grenade - 1997
- Shilpi - 1995
- Adorer Sontan - 1995
- Golapi Ekhon Dhakai - 1994
- Padma Meghna Jamuna - 1991
- Ghar Amar Ghar - 1990
- Biroho Byatha - 1989
- Durnam - 1989
- Lady Smuggler - 1987
- Shuvoda - 1986

== Awards and nominations ==
National Film Awards

Year	Award	Category	Film	Result
2018	National Film Award	Best Cinematography	Postmaster 71	Won
