= C. B. Zaman =

Bangladeshi filmmaker (1945–2024)

- Born: 1945; Gauripur, Goalpara District, Assam Province, British India
- Died: 20 December 2024 (aged 78–79); Delhi, India
- Occupations: Film director, actor, model

C. B. Zaman (Bengali: সি. বি. জামান; 1945 – 20 December 2024) was a Bangladeshi film director, actor, and model who directed many Dhallywood films.

== Life and career ==
Zaman was born in Gauripur, Assam, to Imadur Rahman Chowdhury and Sharifa Khatun Chowdhury. He was a student of M C College.

Zaman directed films between 1973 and 1990. His direction Puroskar won National Film Awards in 1983 in five categories. He also directed films like Ujan Bhati. Kusum Koli, his last direction, was released in 1990.

Besides direction, Zaman also acted in films. He made his acting career debut with Arun Barun Kiron Mala. He also appeared in two television commercials as a model.

Zaman was married to Fatema Zaman. Chowdhury Farhaduzzam is their only son. Zaman died from a heart attack in Delhi, India, on 20 December 2024. He was buried at the Shah Jalal Dargah in Sylhet.

== Selected filmography ==
=== Director ===
- Jhorer Pakhi
- Ujan Bhati
- Puroskar
- Shuvoratri
- Hasi
- Lal Golap
- Kusum Koli

=== Actor ===
- Orun Borun Kiron Mala
- Iye Kore Biye
- Chena Ochena
- Din Jay Kotha Thake
- Trirotno
- Ek Takar Bou
- Neel Achol
- Valobasar Shesh Nei
- Biyer Prostab
