= Chandana Mazumdar =

Bangladeshi folk singer

Chandana Mazumdar চন্দনা মজুমদার
- Born: Kumarkhali, Kushtia District
- Genres: Folk
- Occupation: Playback singer
- Instrument: vocals

Chandana Mazumdar is a Bangladeshi folk singer of the Lalon Geeti genre. She won the Bangladesh National Film Award for Best Female Playback Singer for her performance in the film Monpura (2009).

== Early life and career ==
Mazumdar was born in Kumarkhali in Kushtia District to Nirmal Chandra Majumdar. She first took lessons from her father and later from the Nazrul singer Yakub Ali Khan and the Lalon singer Moksed Ali Shai.

Mazumdar was employed as a singer with Bangladesh Television in 1979 and Bangladesh Betar in 1980.

Mazumdar sang a song for the unreleased film Felani in 2013.

== Discography ==
- Bosonto Batashe
- Tomar Aupar Neeley
- Chokh Gelo Pakhi Re

== Personal life ==
Mazumdar has been married to the folk singer Kiron Chandra Roy since 1979. Together they have a daughter.

== Awards ==
Year	Award	Type	Film	Result
2009	National Film Awards	Best woman playback singer	Monpura	Won
2021	National Film Awards	Best woman Singer	Padma Purana	Nominated
