= Saiful Islam Badal =

Bangladeshi cinematographer

- সাইফুল ইসলাম বাদল
- Occupation: Cinematographer
- Years active: 2004–Present
- Notable work: Aha!; Mrittika Maya; Bachelor
- Awards: National Film Awards (3rd times)

Saiful Islam Badal is a Bangladeshi cinematographer. He won the Bangladesh National Film Award for Best Cinematography twice, for the films Aha! (2007) and Mrittika Maya (2013).

== Selected films ==
- Bachelor - 2004
- Mad_e in Bangladesh - 2007
- Aha! - 2007
- The Floating Man - 2012
- Mrittika Maya - 2013

== Awards and nominations ==
National Film Awards

Year	Award	Category	Film	Result
2007	National Film Award	Best Cinematography	Aha!	Won
2013	National Film Award	Best Cinematography	Mrittika Maya	Won
