= Hasan Ahmed (cinematographer) =

Bangladeshi cinematographer. (born 1998)

- হাসান আহমেদ
- Occupation: Cinematographer
- Years active: 1988–2012
- Notable work: Ghani; Gohine Shobdo
- Awards: National Film Awards (3 times)

Hasan Ahmed is a Bangladeshi Cinematographer. He won the Bangladesh National Film Award for Best Cinematography three times for the films Ghorer Shotru (1994), Ghani (2006) and Gohine Shobdo (2010).

== Selected films ==
- Bir Purush - 1988
- Bojro Mushti - 1989
- Shontrash - 1991
- Top Rangbaaz - 1991
- Ghar Bhanga Ghar - 1992
- Utthan Poton - 1992
- Beporoa - 1992
- Ghatok - 1994
- Commander - 1994
- Ghorer Shotru - 1994
- Bishwapremik -1995
- Moha Milon -1995
- Palabi Kothae - 1997
- Vondo - 1998
- Madam Fuli - 1999
- Pagla Ghonta - 1999
- Joddha - 2000
- Bichchu Bahini - 2001
- Lal Sobuj - 2005
- Ghani - 2006
- Doctor Bari - 2007
- Raja Surja Kha - 2012

== Awards and nominations ==
National Film Awards

Year	Award	Category	Film	Result
1994	National Film Award	Best Cinematography	Ghorer Shotru	Won
2006	National Film Award	Best Cinematography	Ghani	Won
2010	National Film Award	Best Cinematography	Gohine Shobdo	Won
