= Sumon (actor) =

Bangladeshi film actor

- সুমন
- Born: Master Sumon
- Occupation: Film actor
- Years active: 1972–1983
- Notable work: Ashikkhito; Chhutir Ghonta
- Awards: National Film Award (1st time)

Sumon (Popularly known as Master Sumon) is a Bangladeshi film actor. He won the Bangladesh National Film Award for Best Child Artist for the film Ashikkhito (1978) which he shared with Azad Rahman Shakil.

== Selected films ==
- Shikriti (1972)
- Ashikkhito (1978)
- Chhutir Ghonta (1980)
- Puroskar (1983)

== Awards and nominations ==
National Film Awards

Year	Award	Category	Film	Result
1979	National Film Award	Best Child Artist	Ashikkhito	Won
