= Arun Roy =

Bangladeshi cinematographer (1968/1969–2025)

- অরুন রায়
- Born: 1968 or 1969
- Died: 2 January 2025 (aged 56)
- Occupation: Cinematographer
- Years active: 1973–2025
- Notable work: Bodhu Biday; Johnny; Bhaijan
- Awards: National Film Awards (3 times)

Arun Roy (1968 or 1969 – 2 January 2025) was a Bangladeshi cinematographer. He won the Bangladesh National Film Award for Best Cinematography three times for the films Bodhu Biday (1978), Johnny (1983) and Bhaijan (1983). Roy died on 2 January 2025, at the age of 56.

== Awards and nominations ==
National Film Awards

Year	Award	Category	Film	Result
1978	National Film Award	Best Cinematography	Bodhu Biday	Won
1983	National Film Award	Best Cinematography	Johnny	Won
1989	National Film Award	Best Cinematography	Bhaijan	Won
