= Alamgir Kabir (film maker) =

Bangladeshi film director (1938–1989)

- Born: 26 December 1938; Rangamati, Bengal Province, British India
- Died: 20 January 1989 (aged 50); Pabna, Bangladesh
- Education: Dhaka College; University of Dhaka; Oxford University
- Occupation: Filmmaker
- Spouses: Monjura Ibrahim (m. 1968; div. 1975); Jayasree Kabir (m. 1975)
- Children: 3
- Awards: Independence Day Award

Alamgir Kabir (26 December 1938 – 20 January 1989) was a Bangladeshi film director and cultural activist. Three of his feature films are featured in the "Top 10 Bangladeshi Films" list by British Film Institute.

Kabir was awarded Independence Day Award posthumously in 2010 for his contribution to the Bangladeshi culture.

== Early life and education ==
Kabir was born on 26 December 1938 in Rangamati in the then British India. His parents originated from Banaripara Upazila of Barisal. He completed the matriculation in 1952 from Dhaka Collegiate School and the intermediate in 1954 from Dhaka College. After completion of bachelor's from the University of Dhaka in physics, he went to England to study electrical engineering at Oxford University at the age of 22.

== Career ==
During his stay in Oxford University he watched The Seventh Seal by Ingmar Bergman several times and became attracted to filmmaking. He attended the British Film Institute to complete a number of courses on the history of the film industry, film direction and aesthetics.

He also got involved with the Communist Party of Great Britain and became a reporter of the affiliated newspaper, the Daily Worker. In the early 1960s, Alamgir went for guerrilla warfare training in Cuba. As a reporter of the communist daily, he took interview of Cuban President Fidel Castro. He also took part in the wars of liberation of Palestine and Algeria. Alamgir was the founder of organisations such as East Pakistan House and East Bengal Liberation Front at London and was active in the campaign against racial discrimination.

In 1966, Alamgir came back to Dhaka. The Ayub government imprisoned him for his involvement with the leftist movement. Later, he started his professional life as a journalist. With the start of the war of independence in 1971, he joined the Swadhin Bangla Betar Kendra as the chief of its English section. He also worked as the chief reporter of the Bangladesh government in exile. This period also marks the start of his directorial life with the making of documentaries.

After the war of independence, he started making feature films. During 1981-82 Alamgir was the coordinator of the Film Appreciation Courses organized by the Film Institute, Government of Bangladesh.

Alamgir died on 20 January 1989 in the Jamuna River at Nagarbari Ferrighat when returning from Bogra after attending a film seminar. Actress Tina Khan, accompanying him in the same vehicle, also died in the accident.

== Filmography ==
=== Feature films ===
- Dhire Bohe Meghna (1973)
- Surjo Konna (Daughter of The Sun), 1975
- Simana Periye (Across The Fringe), 1977
- Rupali Saikate (The Loner), 1979
- Mohana (The Mouth of a River), 1983
- Mahanayak (The Great Hero), 1985
- Parinita (The Wedded), 1984

=== Short films ===
- Liberation Fighter
- Pogrom in Bangladesh
- Culture in Bangladesh
- Sufia, Amulya Dhan (The Invaluable)
- Bhor Halo Dor Kholo (Open the Door now at the Dawn)
- Amra Dujan (The Two of Us)
- Ek Sagar Rakter Binimoye (At the Cost of a Sea of Blood)
- Manikanchan (The Diamond)
- Chorasrot (The Unseen Trend)

== Awards ==
- National Film Award for best Dialogue - 1977
- Cine Journalists Award
- Zahir Raihan Film Award of Uttaran
- Syed Mohammad Parvez Award
- Independence Day Award (2010)

== Personal life ==
Kabir married Manjura Begum in 1968. After separating from her, he married actress Jayasree Kabir in 1975. He had two daughters, Elora and Ajanta, and a son Lenin Saurav Kabir.

== Publications ==
- Cinema in Pakistan (1969)
- Started his publication house "Vintage Publication" (1978)
- Film in Bangladesh (1979)
- Mohona: Chittranatya and This was Radio Bangladesh 1971 (1984)
