= Ek Takar Bou =

Bangladeshi romantic film

- Directed by: P. A. Kajol
- Written by: Komol Sarkar; P. A. Kajol; Chhatku Ahmed
- Produced by: Nisha Tasnim Sheikh
- Starring: Shakib Khan; Shabnur; Rumana; Razzak
- Cinematography: Mojibul Haque Bhuiya
- Edited by: Chishti Zamal
- Music by: Shawkat Ali Emon and Alauddin Ali
- Distributed by: Hriddhi Talkies
- Release date: 2 October 2008
- Running time: 137 minutes
- Country: Bangladesh
- Language: Bengali

Ek Takar Bou (Bengali: এক টাকার বউ) is a Bangladeshi romantic film directed by P.A. Kajol. The film stars Shakib Khan, Shabnur, Rumana, Razzak and many more. This film was released in 80 cinema halls at a time in Eid festival.

== Plot ==
The sisters, Kajal and Kiran, love their cousin, Raj. Raj likes to joke with the two sisters about love. Kiran spends all day with Raj's father, Shaukat Chowdhury, and calls him 'Baba'. Kajal, on the other hand, works as Raj's assistant in his office. They have an office romance and marry at the registrar's office without telling anyone in the family. A few days after the wedding, Kajal learns that her uncle is arranging a marriage between Raj and Kiran. Concerned for her younger sister's happiness, Kajal leaves home, staging a drama involving her marriage to Mohabbat.

Kajol has a daughter. She lives with her father in a small house. One day, Dighi, Kajol's daughter, runs out in front of Raj's car. A friendship begins between them. Raj often visits Dighi. One day, he discovers her true identity.

== Cast ==
- Shakib Khan
- Shabnur
- Rumana
- Dighi
- Razzak
- Kabila
- Shiba Shanu
- Subrata
- Dilip Ray
- C. B. Zaman

== Soundtrack ==
The songs of this film was composed by Shawkat Ali Emon and lyrics were penned by Kabir Bakul. Background score of this film were composed by Alauddin Ali.

- "Aula Premer Baula Batash" - Baby Naznin, Monir Khan
- "Mon Dilam Pran Dilam" - Runa Laila, Kumar Bishwajit
- "Ekta Nouka Kine Dibo" - Agun
- "Bhalobasha Bhalobasha Thako Tumi Dure" - Kanak Chapa
- "O Little Friend" - Sabina Yasmin and Andrew Kishore

== Awards ==
- Meril Prothom Alo Awards- 2008
- Public Choice Awards for Best Film Actress-Shabnur
