= Abul Khayer =

Bangladeshi cinematographer

- আবুল খায়ের
- Occupation: Cinematographer
- Years active: 1976–2002
- Notable work: Sasurbari Zindabad; Ajante
- Awards: National Film Awards (1st times)

Abul Khayer is a Bangladeshi Cinematographer. He won the Bangladesh National Film Award for Best Cinematography for the film Setubandhan (1987).

== Selected films ==
- Kajol Rekha - 1976
- Dabi - 1978
- Jinjir - 1979
- Alif Laila - 1980
- Bini Sutar Mala - 1980
- Allah Meherban - 1981
- Manosi - 1982
- Nantu Ghotok - 1982
- Razia Sultana - 1984
- Sondhi - 1987
- Hisab Chai - 1988
- Bidhata - 1989
- Byathar Daan - 1989
- Jinner Badshah - 1989
- Mayer Doa - 1990
- Sneho - 1994
- Den Mohor - 1995
- Ajante - 1996
- Shashurbari Zindabad - 2002

== Awards and nominations ==
National Film Awards

Year	Award	Category	Film	Result
1987	National Film Award	Best Cinematography	Setubandhan	Won
