= Jayashree Kabir =

Bangladeshi Bengali film actress (1952–2026)

Jayasree Kabir
- জয়শ্রী রায় কবির
- Born: Jayashree Roy; 22 June 1952
- Died: 12 January 2026 (aged 73); Romford, London, England
- Occupation: Actress
- Spouse: Alamgir Kabir (divorced)

Jayashree Kabir (née Roy; 22 June 1952 – 12 January 2026) was a Bangladeshi Bengali film actress. She acted in around 30 films in West Bengal and Bangladesh.

== Career ==
While studying at South Point School, Jayashree Roy earned the title of Miss Kolkata in 1968. She made her debut with Satyajit Ray's Pratidwandi in 1969, which also marked her breakthrough role. She married Bangladeshi film director Alamgir Kabir and starred in two of his films, Simana Periye and Rupali Soikote, which are regarded by the British Film Institute (BFI) as among the finest films to have come out of Bangladesh.

== Later life and death ==
Later in life, she moved to London. She taught English at a higher education college.

Jayashree had a son, Lenin Saurav Kabir, with her husband Alamgir Kabir. The couple divorced shortly before Alamgir's death in 1989. Kabir died in London on 12 January 2026, at the age of 73.

== Films ==
- Pratidwandi (1970)
- Rodonbhora bosonto (1974)
- Surjo Konna (1975)
- Simana Periye (1977)
- Sabyasachi (1977)
- Rupali Saikate (1979)
- Ashadharan (1982)
- Puroskar (1983)
