= Jinat =

Bangladeshi actress

- Occupation: Actress

Jinat is a Bangladeshi film actress. She received Bangladesh National Film Award for Best Supporting Actress in 1986 for Shuvoda.

== Selected filmography ==
- Shuvoda
- Nyay Onyay
- Kusum Koli

== Awards and nominations ==
Year	Award	Category	Work	Result
1986	National Film Award	Best Supporting Actress	Shuvoda	Won
