= Abdul Latif Bachchu =

Bangladeshi film director and cinematographer

- আব্দুল লতিফ বাচ্চু
- Born: 9 January 1942; Sirajganj, Bengal Province, British India
- Died: 4 January 2026 (aged 83); Dhaka, Bangladesh
- Occupations: Film director, cinematographer

Abdul Latif Bachchu (9 January 1942 – 4 January 2026) was a Bangladeshi film director and cinematographer. 65 films was credited to him as the cinematographer.

== Background ==
Bachchu was born on 9 January 1942 in Sirajganj in the then British India.

== Career ==
Bachchu started his career as an assistant to cinematographer Sadhan Roy working on several films including Alor Pipasha, Agantuk and Darpachurna. In 1968, he made his debut as the principal cinematographer for the film Rupkumari.

Bachchu's most notable work is on Abujh Mon, produced by Chitra Zahir and directed by Kazi Zahir.

As a film director, Bachchu worked on around nine feature films which include Jadur Banshi, Dipkanya, Notun Bou, Mr Maula and Protarok.

Bachchu served as president of the Bangladesh Cinematographers' Association.

== Personal life and death ==
Bachchu had three sons – all residents of the United States. He had a brother-in-law, Anwar Hossain Bulu, who is also a noted cinematographer.

Bachchu died at a private hospital in Dhanmondi, Dhaka on 4 January 2026.

== Awards ==
- Fazlul Haq Smriti Award
- Bangladesh Film Journalists' Association (BACHSAS) Award (1975)
