= A. K. M. Jahangir Khan =

Bangladeshi film producer (1939–2020)

- Born: 21 April 1939; Chauddagram, Comilla, Bengal Presidency, British India
- Died: 15 February 2020 (aged 80); United Hospital, Dhaka, Bangladesh
- Other name: Movie Mughal

A. K. M. Jahangir Khan (21 April 1939 – 15 February 2020) was a Bangladeshi film producer who produced 43 films. He was known by the name of "Movie Mughal".

== Biography ==
Khan was born on 21 April 1939 in Chouddagram of Comilla. He completed matriculation from Dhaka Collegiate School. Later, he completed higher secondary and post graduate studies from Jagannath College in 1960 and 1962 respectively.

Khan produced films under the banner of his own production company named Alamgir Pictures. He produced films like Noyonmoni, Ki Je Kori, Simana Periye, Chandranath and Shuvoda. Noyonmoni won National Film Awards in two categories, Ki Je Kori won National Film Awards in one category, Simana Periye won National Film Awards in four categories, Chandranath won National Film Awards in four categories and Shuvoda won National Film Awards in thirteen categories. He was given the title "Movie Mughal" by Ahmed Zaman Chowdhury in 1978. His last film Rongin Noyonmoni was released in 1998.

Khan died on 15 February 2020 at United Hospital in Dhaka at the age of 80. His daughter is singer Jhumu Khan.

== Selected filmography ==
- Noyonmoni
- Tufan
- Badol
- Kudrot
- Rajsinghason
- Saodagor
- Vijayini Sonavan
- Rooper Rani Chorer Raja
- Rajkanya
- Surjo Konna
- Ki Je Kori
- Simana Periye
- Chandranath
- Shuvoda
- Rongin Rupban
- Rongin Kanchonmala
- Ali Baba Chollish Chor
- Altabanu
- Disco Dancer
- Padmabati
- Somrat
- Tin Bahadur
- Daku Morzina
- Sonai Bandhu
- Rangin Rakhalbandhu
- Ma
- Babar Adesh
- Prem Diwana
- Rongin Noyonmoni
- Kanya
- Shirshamahal
- Amar Ma
