= Shafiqul Islam Swapan =

Bangladeshi cinematographer

- শফিকুল ইসলাম স্বপন
- Occupation: Cinematographer
- Years active: 1973–present
- Notable work: Ghuddi; Nalish
- Awards: National Film Awards (1980 and 1982)

Shafiqul Islam Swapan is a Bangladeshi cinematographer. He won the Bangladesh National Film Award for Best Cinematography twice, for the films Ghuddi (1980) and Nalish (1982).

== Selected films ==
- Ghuddi – 1980
- Nalish – 1982
- Chandon Diper Rajkonna – 1984

== Awards and nominations ==
Year	Award	Category	Film	Result
1980	National Film Award	Best Cinematography	Ghuddi	Won
1982	National Film Award	Best Cinematography	Nalish	Won
