= Nazrul Islam Babu (lyricist) =

Bangladeshi lyricist

- নজরুল ইসলাম বাবু
- Born: 17 July 1949; Jamalpur, East Bengal, Dominion of Pakistan
- Died: 14 September 1990 (aged 41)
- Occupation: Lyricist

Nazrul Islam Babu (17 July 1949 – 14 September 1990) was a Bangladeshi lyricist and freedom fighter . His notable songs include "Sob Kota Janala Khule Dao Na", "O Amar Aat Koti Phul" and "Ekti Bangladesh Tumi Jagroto Janotar". He won Bangladesh National Film Award for Best Lyrics for the film Padma Meghna Jamuna (1991).

== Biography ==
Babu was born to Bazlul Kader and Rezia Begum. He was the eldest among four brothers and five sisters. Babu studied in Brojomohun College and Ashek Mahmud College in Jamalpur.

On 22 January 2022, Babu was awarded the Ekushey Padak, the second most important award for civilians in Bangladesh.

Babu married Shahin Akhter on 23 November 1984. They had two daughters, Nazia and Nafia.

== Works ==
- Padma Meghna Jamuna (1991)
- Shuvoda (1986)
- Mohanayok (1985)
- Dui Poisar Alta (1982)
