= Buk Fatey To Mukh Foteyna =

- Movie poster
- Directed by: Badiul Alam Khokan
- Written by: Vamsi Paidipally
- Produced by: Jononi Kothachitro
- Starring: Shakib Khan; Apu Biswas; Rumana
- Music by: Ali Akram
- Production company: BFDC
- Release date: 27 October 2012
- Running time: 135 minutes
- Country: Bangladesh
- Language: Bengali

Buk Fatey To Mukh Foteyna (Bengali: বুক ফাটে তো মুখ ফোটে না) is a 2012 Bangladeshi romantic comedy film directed by Bodiul Alam Khokan, starring Shakib Khan, Apu Biswas and Rumana Khan. The film was released on Eid al-Adha of 27 October 2012. The film is remake of 2010 Telugu-language film Brindavanam.

== Plot ==
Riman (Shakib Khan) is the only child of industrialist Mirza Saeed (Kazi Hayat). Riman is loved by his college girlfriend Sohana (Rumana Khan) but Riman considers Sohana just a girlfriend. Sohana and Tulip (Apu-Biswas) are two girlfriends but they are actually cousins yet none of them knows that. However, later on, they find out that they are cousins.

Tulip's father's name is Sharif Chowdhury (Sohail Rana) and Sohana's father's name is Farid Chowdhtogether.al). Amjad Khan (Sadek Bachchu), the aunt of Tulip (Apu-Biswas) wants to own Sharif Chowdhury's property by making Tulip his daughter-in-law. So Amjad Khan conspired to create enmity between Sharif and Farid Chowdhury and separated the two brothers. Amjad Khan's son "Badrul" (Misha Sawdagor) is a goon and a mastan. Badrul wants to marry Tulip. When Tulip's marriage is discussed, Tulip consults her grandfather and brings Riman home to play the role of lover to prevent the marriage. She reveals that she loves Riman. But Riman when comes to act and they truly fall in love. Sohana is deeply hurt by this so she sacrifices her love for Tulip's happiness.

Meanwhile, Riman Farid Chowdhury and Sharif Chowdhury settled the enmity and brought the two brothers together. On the other hand, Sharif Chowdhury decided to marry Tulip with Riman. Badrul is furious to learn of this decision, and tells everyone that Riman is not Tulip's lover, he is only playing the role of lover. Meanwhile Sohana's father discovers that Sohana loved a boy and that he left her. So Sohana's father becomes angry and brought the boy's parents and discovered that the boy whom Sohana loved was Riman. And then everyone mistakenly believed Riemann to be a fraud. But when Sohana's father kept beating Riman due to cheating, Sohana's grandfather came and revealed everything in front of everyone. And this proves that Riman did all these things for the good of Tulip. But in the meantime Tulip was kidnapped by Badrul. After Riman rescued Tulip from Badrul, the police came and arrested Badrul. Then the movie ends with everyone together.

== Cast ==
- Shakib Khan as Rimaan Khan aka RAM
- Apu Biswas Tulip Chowdhury
- Rumana Khan as Suhana Chowdhury
- Misha Sawdagor as Badrul Khan
- Sohel Rana as Sharif Chowdhury
- Sadek Bachchu as Amzad Khan
- Khaleda Aktar Kolpona
- Kazi Hayat as Mirza Sayeed Khan
- Uzzal as Farid Chowdhury
- Prabir Mitra

== Soundtrack ==
The soundtrack was composed by Ali Akram.

Track listing
No.	Title	Singer(s)	Length
1.	"Kemon Kore Jani Nato"	Dolly Sayontoni, Polash	3:25
2.	"Ei Tumi Sei Tumi"	Andrew Kishore, Runa Laila	3:40
3.	"Premeri Shuru"		3:50
4.	"Tumari Kache Ale"		4:02
5.	"Hridoyer Janalay Prem"	S I Tutul, Moon
