= Streer Paona =

Bangladeshi film

- Poster
- Directed by: Sheikh Nazrul Islam
- Screenplay by: Sheikh Nazrul Islam
- Produced by: Anjuman Ara
- Starring: Shabana; Alamgir; Ilyas Kanchan; Nuton; Diti; Wasimul Bari Rajib
- Cinematography: Reza Latif
- Music by: Alauddin Ali
- Release date: 1991
- Running time: 125 minutes
- Country: Bangladesh
- Language: Bengali

Streer Paona is a 1991 Bangladeshi film. It stars Ilyas Kanchan, Diti, Shabana, Alamgir and Nuton in the lead roles. The latter earned Bangladesh National Film Award for Best Supporting Actress for this film.

== Cast ==
- Shabana
- Alamgir
- Ilyas Kanchan
- Nuton
- Diti
- Wasimul Bari Rajib

== Soundtrack ==
Alauddin Ali has composed all the songs.

No.	Song title	Singer(s)
1	"Asol Khobor Jaante Chai"	Sabina Yasmin and Khalid Hasan Milu

== Accolades ==
- 16th Bangladesh National Film Awards Best Supporting Actress – Nuton
