= Puroskar =

1983 Bangladeshi film

Puroshkar
- Poster
- Directed by: C. B. Zaman
- Screenplay by: Syed Shamsul Haque
- Produced by: Ramala Saha
- Starring: Bulbul Ahmed; Joysree Kabir; Master Sumon; Master Shakeel
- Cinematography: Anwar Hossain
- Edited by: Atiqur Rahman
- Music by: Satya Saha
- Distributed by: Swaralipi Banichitra
- Release date: 22 August 1983
- Running time: 128 minutes
- Country: Bangladesh
- Language: Bengali

Puroskar (Bengali: পুরস্কার; English: The Prize) is a 1983 Bangladeshi film starring Bulbul Ahmed and Indian actress (former Miss Kolkata) Jayshri Kabir opposite him. It earned five awards at the 8th Bangladesh National Film Awards.

== Cast ==
- Bulbul Ahmed as Mr. Masud Ahmed
- Joysree Kabir as Apa
- Master Sumon as Ratan
- Master Shakeel as Badshah
- ATM Shamsuzzaman as Gofran Miah
- Shawkat Akbar as the ministry of the Juvenile Detention
- Inam Ahmed
- Khalilur Rahman Babar
- Kayes
- Saifuddin Ahmed
- Anisur Rahman Anis
- Akhtar Hossain as Ratan's Uncle
- Sushma as Ratan's Aunt
- Shahabuddin Ahmed
- Pulin Mitra
- Arup Ratan Choudhury
- Bashar
- Sirajul Islam

== Soundtrack ==
1. "Aaj Kono Kaj Nei" - Samina Chowdhury, Abdul Jabbar
2. "Harjit Chirodin Thakbe" - Shahnaz Rahmatullah
3. "Amader Potaka Amader Maan" - Sabina Yasmin

== Awards ==
Bangladesh National Film Awards

- Best Film - Satya Saha
- Best Supporting Actor - Shakil
- Best Screenplay - Syed Shamsul Haque
- Best Dialogue - Syed Shamsul Haque
- Best Cinematographer - Anwar Hossain
