= Nilufar Yasmin =

Bangladeshi singer (1948–2003)

- Born: 13 February 1948; Kolkata, West Bengal, Dominion of India
- Died: 10 March 2003 (aged 55)
- Education: Sociology (Master's)
- Alma mater: University of Dhaka
- Occupations: Singer, lecturer
- Spouse: Khan Ataur Rahman (m. 1968; died 1997)
- Children: Khan Asifur Rahman Agun
- Relatives: Sabina Yasmin (sister); Farida Yasmin (sister); Fauzia Yasmin (sister)
- Awards: Ekushey Padak

Nilufar Yasmin (13 February 1948 – 10 March 2003) was a Bangladeshi singer of Nazrul Sangeet, Rajanikanta Geeti, Dwijendra Geeti and Atul Prasdi genre. She was the fourth of five Yasmin sisters of Bangladesh music. Her siblings are Farida Yasmin, Fauzia Yasmin, Nazma Yasmin, and Sabina Yasmin. She was awarded Ekushey Padak in 2004 by the Government of Bangladesh. She won Bangladesh National Film Award for Best Female Playback Singer for her performance in the film Shuvoda (1986).

== Early life and education ==
Yasmin was born on 13 February 1948 in Kolkata. Her father, Lutfar Rahman, was a former provincial civil servant of British India and her mother Begum Mouluda Khatun from Murshidabad was a vocal artist who took music lessons from musician Ustad Kader Baksh. Yasmin completed her bachelor's and master's in sociology from the University of Dhaka in 1968 and 1970 respectively. She first took classical music lessons from PC Gomes in 1964. Later she took training from Prashun Bandyopadhyay, Mira Bandyopadhyay, Sagiruddin Khan, Fazlul Haq, and A. Daud. She took Nazrul song lessons from Sheikh Lutfar Rahman and Sudhin Das.

== Career ==
Nilufar Yasmin sang classical, Nazrul Sangeet, and Kirtan, Atulprasad, Dwijendralal and Rajanikanta, even Puratoni, Tappa, and Thungri.

Yasmin was appointed as a lecturer in the department of dramatic arts and music at the University of Dhaka in 1995.

== Awards and achievements ==
- Bachsas Awards (1975)
- Bangladesh Cine Journalists Association Award (1975)
- Bachsas Awards (1986)
- Bangladesh National Film Award for Best Female Playback Singer (1986)
- Nazrul Medal 1410 (2003)
- Sidhubhai Smriti Padak (2003)
- Ekushey Padak (2004)
- Gaan-e Gaan-e Gunijon Shongbordhona (2010)

The Library of the Natyokala Department in Dhaka University is named as 'Nilufar Yasmin Memorial Library' in 2006.

== Personal life ==
Yasmin was married to Khan Ataur Rahman. Their son Khan Asifur Rahman Agun(b. 1971) is a musician. Along with a son, she has 2 grandsons named Michhil(b. 2000) and Moshal(b. 2009). Michhil's legal name Khan Yakin Rahman was chosen by Yasmin.

Yasmin died of cancer on 10 March 2003.

== Discography ==
- Pother Sheshe
- Bangladesher Hridoy Hote
