= Surjo Konna =

Bangladeshi film

- Poster
- Directed by: Alamgir Kabir
- Screenplay by: Alamgir Kabir
- Produced by: AKM Jahangir Khan
- Starring: Jayshree Kabir; Sumita Devi; Bulbul Ahmed
- Edited by: Debabrata Sengupta
- Music by: Satya Saha
- Release date: 1975
- Country: Bangladesh
- Language: Bengali

Surjo Konna (Bengali: সুর্য কন্যা; English: "Daughter of the Sun") is a 1975 Bangladeshi fantasy drama film starring Jayshree Kabir, Bulbul Ahmed and Sumita Devi. Indian veteran singer Sandhya Mukherjee sang the timeless hit song "Ami Je Andhare Bondini" for the film.

== Plot ==
Lenin was an unemployed artist of a lower-middle-class family. He is the protagonist of the film who is not at all like the formula-heroes of the commercial genre. Most often Lenin roams around in his imagination; escaping his reality of lower-middle-class life. He fulfills his failure in his imagination. His clerk father wanted him to be a doctor. But instead of becoming a doctor, his son became an unemployed painter, who is still dependent on him. He is still hopeful about his two other children. Even though he is a clerk, he secretly and passionately wants his children to upgrade in the upper class of the society. One day, after being cursed by his father about unemployment and laziness, Lenin leaves his home. Lenin is unwilling to give up his dream in the midst of hundreds of hardships, as he knows the inadequacies of his family. He wants to break all the irregularities of the society by awakening his political entity but soon he becomes aware of his limitations. On his way he coincidentally meets his old college friend Russell. Russell is from a rich family. Due to his financial stability, he never had any imagination capability like Lenin. He is realistic. Since he studied abroad, his attitude and mentality were likewise. He did not trust in platonic relationships and believed that the responsibility of marriage breaks off everything. For this reason, his marriage didn't last long. Now he is having a relationship with Monika, sales executive of Five Stars stationaries shop; mostly a physical relationship. Monika wants recognition of her relationship but Russell does not want to get involved in marriage. On being rejected, Monika breaks off her relationship with Russell and plans to go abroad. After Monika left, Russell understood how helpless he is without her. At last he became bound to get Monika back.

As per Russell's proposal, Lenin accepts to work in his (Russell) shop, as a display artist. After Lenin starts going to office, his alone time of making sculpture begins. One day, the mannequin comes into life. At first, Lenin was scared but eventually, he falls for her. This sculpture was the daughter of the sun. She keeps telling Lenin about the incidents that happened in her past life. Once she was a pearl and then some lustfulstrong men captures her. Rest is the history of her prison life. She wants to be freed. Lenin's lust less love will free her. Even though Lenin did not agree at first, but then he promises to love her selflessly. She also makes him promise to not remind her about her past life when she is freed. As the day of her freedom comes near, she asks Lenin to meet her at 4.00 am, because they both will be freed together. At the celebration of Russell and Monika's marriage, Lenin drinks on Russell's request and falls asleep. When he wakes up sometime before 4am, he starts running towards the hotel like a delirium. In the last scene, it is seen that Lenin is lying down in the hospital bed with his legs and arms injured. He remembers getting hurt by broken glasses while he was running toward the hotel like a delirium that night. Suddenly he sees the mannequin sitting beside the hospital bed. His mother introduces her as Sujala, a friend of Cleo. Lenin stays quiet as per his previous promises. Then with different close-up shots of Lenin and Sujala being intimate, and with a graphics writing "and they happily lived ever after" shown on the screen, the movie ends. Lenin's love is infused – in this metaphorical sense he points out the way to bring the woman back to her proper position from the darkness of time. The director described Lenin's character as a dreamy and courageous character at the same time. Only love will break that bondage. In the love of eternity.

== Cast ==
- Tanuja
- Bulbul Ahmed
- Jayashree Roy

== Soundtrack ==
#	Song-title	Singer(s)	Lyricist	Composer	Picturised on	Note(s)
1	Ami Je Andhare Bondini	Sandhya Mukherjee	Fazal Shahabuddin	Satya Saha	Jayshree Kabir	
2	Chena Chena Lage	Shyamal Mitra	Fazal Shahabuddin	Satya Saha	Bulbul Ahmed	
3	On a night like this	Jayshree Kabir	Alamgir Kabir	Satya Saha	Jayshree Kabir	
