= Rumana Khan =

Bangladeshi actress

- রুমানা খান
- Occupation: Actress
- Spouses: Anzam Masud (m. 2001; div. 2003); Sazzad (m. 2004; div. 2013); Elin Rahman (m. 2015)

Rumana Khan is a Bangladeshi film and television actress. She won Bangladesh National Film Award for Best Supporting Actress for her role in the film Bhalobaslei Ghor Bandha Jay Na (2010).

Debuting with the romantic comedy Biye Bari, she became a successful supporting actress in where she often either portrayed as kind lady who helped needy people and solved family and other issues of people or a happy lover who eventually fails in getting her dream men. Movies such as,Ek Takar Bou ,Swami Stirir Wadah ,Bhalobaslei Ghor Bandha Jay Na . After 2010, she slowly left the film industry after acting in her last film Ma Amar Chokher Moni.

== Personal life ==
Khan was first married to filmmaker Anzam Masud in 2001. After their divorce in 2003, she married businessman, Sazzad, in 2004. She married her third husband, Alin Rahman, in 2015.

== Filmography ==
- Buk Fatey To Mukh Foteyna (2012)
