= Farida Yasmin (singer) =

Bangladeshi playback singer

- Born: 3 February 1940; Murshidabad, Bengal Presidency, British India
- Died: 8 August 2015 (aged 75); Dhaka, Bangladesh
- Occupation: Playback singer
- Spouse: Qazi Anwar Hussain
- Relatives: Fauzia Yasmin (sister); Sabina Yasmin (sister); Nilufar Yasmin (sister); Nazma Yasmin (sister)

Farida Yasmin (3 February 1940 – 8 August 2015) was a Bangladeshi playback singer.

== Early life ==
Yasmin was born in Murshidabad at her maternal grandparents' house. She took lessons from her mother, Mouluda Khatun and from Durgaprasad Roy, and Ustad Moti Miya.

In 1959 she debuted her playback singer career in the film Ei Desh Tomar Amar.

== Personal life ==
Yasmin was married to writer Qazi Anwar Hussain. She has four sisters – Nilufar Yasmin, Fauzia Yasmin, Nazma Yasmin, and Sabina Yasmin, all of them are notable singers.
