= Azizur Rahman (film director) =

Bangladeshi film director (1939–2022)

- আজিজুর রহমান
- Born: 10 October 1939; Bogra, Bengal Presidency, British Raj
- Died: 14 March 2022 (aged 82); Toronto, Canada
- Occupation: Film director
- Awards: Ekushey Padak (2025)

Azizur Rahman (10 October 1939 – 14 March 2022) was a Bangladeshi film director. His directorial debut was the 1967 film, Saiful Mulk Badiuzzamal. During his career, he directed 53 films in total. His notable films include Chhutir Ghonta (1980) and Ashikkhito (1978).

== Personal life ==
On 14 March 2022, Azizur Rahman passed away in Toronto, Canada. Earlier, due to illness, he was treated in a hospital in Canada for a year.

== Early life ==
His interest in the arts began at an early age. He used to observe the world around him and imagine movie posters which he would later draw by hand. By the 8th grade, his uncle gifted him his first camera. From then on, this camera accompanied him everywhere he went, including on buying trips to India where he would go with his father. He started a small business taking passport pictures for the ladies in his village. He would have to go to a neighboring village to develop those pictures. To expand his business, he built a small studio in his home and, learned how to develop the pictures on his own. To help him further, his father and uncle helped him by setting him up with a commercial studio called Rahman Studio. He was 14 years of age. At the same time, his interest in movies also developed. His artistic endeavors expanded by him creating movie posters and banners for the local movie theater, Minar Cinema. After graduating from high school in 1953, his father wanted him to go to Rajshahi for further education. He had no interest in pursuing the science subjects his father wanted and instead wanted to go to art school. He sold his camera for 50 taka, went to the capital of Dhaka, and enrolled at Dhaka University in the faculty of fine arts (Charukola Institute). After admission fees of 30 taka, he had only 20 taka to start his new life. This continued for a few years. In 1957, just before graduation, he started working for Evergreen Publicity, through which he was introduced to Subhash Dutta, a film actor, and Nitun Kunda, a sculptor. As colleagues, these three would work together to design, market, and paint the posters and banners for the up-and-coming movies of the time.

Soon after, Mr. Dutta asked if he would be interested in working in films. He spoke of Mr. Et Hesham, who was filming a Bengali movie nearby. Azizur Rahman was interested in breaking into the movie industry and spoke with the producers. It turned out that they were the same owners of the Minar Cinema that he used to work for years earlier. After catching up, they expressed interest in working with Azizur Rahman. As Mr. Dutta already filled the role of art director. He offered him the position of third assistant director. The feature was called “Ey Desh Tomar Amar.” He continued working with This director until 1967, working his way up the ladder to the position of chief assistant director. By this time, he had worked on over 30 features. In 1967, he transitioned to principal director, his first film was a folk story set in Mymensingh, called Sailful Mulk Bodizamal. It was the first film that was shot in both Urdu and Bengali. It was cast by artist Azim Sujata. He continued his directorial career until 2012, having made over 53 movies. Amongst these are Somadhan, Adithi, Myar Anchol, Aparad, Gormil, Amar Prem, Anubhab, Obhiman, Shap Mukhti, Oshikhito, Chutir Ghonta, Matir Ghor, Dukhini Johura, Doctar Bari, Janata Express, etc. He brought the spotlight to a lot of actors such as Suchu Rita, Shabana, Shabnaz Naim, Rozina, and Sattar.

Oshikhito was featured at the Moscow Film Festival. Chutir Ghonta and Janata express were at the Taskan Film Festival (Uzbekistan). Matir Ghor was in the Romania Film Festival. In his travels, he has visited and learned from film studios all over the world including Pine Studios in London, universal studios in LA, Moscovite Studios in Moscow, and Film City in Mumbai, India.

In addition to directing, he has also produced an additional 10 films. He has received several awards from all over the world.

Azizur Rahman has been married to Shamim Bhuiyan since 1972. He has two children and three grandchildren. His daughter, Aliya Rahman Bindi has followed in his footsteps by attending film school.

== Films ==
1. Saiful Mulk Badiuzzamal (1967)
2. Madhumala (1968)
3. Shikriti (1972)
4. Somadhan (1972)
5. Atithi (1973)
6. Porichoy (1974)
7. Oporadh (1975)
8. Garmil (1976)
9. Shapmukti (1976)
10. Taal Betal (1976)
11. Kuwasha (1977)
12. Amor Prem (1977)
13. Anubhab (1977)
14. Ashikkhito (1978)
15. Agnishikha (1978)
16. Matir Ghar (1979)
17. Pran Sajani (1979)
18. Chhutir Ghonta (1980)
19. Shesh Uttor (1980)
20. Sonar Tori (1981)
21. Mohanagar (1981)
22. Sampanwala
23. Rangin Rupban
24. Pratidan
25. Janata Express (1981)
26. Jontor Montor (1982)
27. Mehman (1983)
28. Mayer Achol (1984)
29. Ali Baba Chalish Chor (1988)
30. Sheesh Mahal (1991)
31. Swashur Bari (1991)
32. Bap Beta 420 (1991)
33. Dil (1992)
34. Zid (1993)
35. Lozza (1995)
36. Ghore Ghore Juddho (1997)
37. Kotha Dao (1997)
38. Doctor Bari (2007)
39. Dukkhini Johora (2007)
40. Jomidar Barir Meye (2008)
41. Mati (2016)
