= Badhu Biday =

1978 film

- Bengali: বধূ বিদায়
- Directed by: Kazi Zahir
- Screenplay by: Bulbul Ahmed
- Starring: Shabana; Kabari; Bulbul Ahmed
- Music by: Alauddin Ali; Gazi Mazharul Anwar (lyrics)
- Release date: 1978
- Country: Bangladesh
- Language: Bengali

Badhu Biday (Bengali: বধূ বিদায়; lit. Farewell of the Bride) is a 1978 Bangladeshi drama film starring Kabari, Bulbul Ahmed and Shabana opposite him. Bulbul garnered Bangladesh National Film Award for Best Actor for his performance in the film.

== Cast ==
- Shabana as Chaya
- Kabari as Maya
- Bulbul Ahmed as Sagor
- Rawshan Jamil as Sagor's mother
- Tele Samad as Ashiq
- Abul Hayat as Master Moshai
- Sultana
- Nazmul Huda Bachchu
- ATM Shamsuzzaman

== Track listing ==
1. "Ekush Khani Dekho" - Sabina Yasmin
2. "Ektu Phire Dekho" - Runa Laila (Debu Bhattacharya)
3. "O Akash O Nodi" - Sabina Yasmin

== Awards ==
Bangladesh National Film Awards

- Best Actor - Bulbul Ahmed
