= Noyoner Alo =

Bangladeshi film

- Poster
- Directed by: Belal Ahmed
- Produced by: Shahnaz Begum
- Starring: Zafar Iqbal; Kajori; Prabir Mitra; Subarna Mustafa; Anwar Hossain
- Music by: Ahmed Imtiaz Bulbul
- Release date: 1984
- Country: Bangladesh
- Language: Bengali

Noyoner Alo (English: Eyesight) (Bengali: নয়নের আলো) is a 1984 Bangladeshi film directed by Belal Ahmed. It stars Zafar Iqbal, Kajori, Subarna Mustafa, Raisul Islam Asad, Prabir Mitra and Anwar Hossain. The film was remade into Bengali cinema in 1998 with the same title starring Prosenjit Chatterjee and Tapas Paul. Belal Ahmed garnered Bangladesh National Film Award for Best Cinematographer. Samina Chowdhury earned Bachsas Award for Best Female Playback Singer.

== Cast ==
- Jafar Iqbal as Jiban
- Kajori as Alo

== Soundtrack ==
Noyoner Alo track listing
No.	Title	Writer(s)	composer	Length
1.	"Amar Sara Deho Kheyo Go Mati"	Ahmed Imtiaz Bulbul	Andrew Kishore	:
2.	"Amar Babar Mukhe"	Ahmed Imtiaz Bulbul	Andrew Kishore	:
3.	"Amar Buker Modhyekhane"	Ahmed Imtiaz Bulbul	Andrew Kishore and Samina Chowdhury	:
4.	"Ami Tommar Duti Chokhe"	Ahmed Imtiaz Bulbul	Samina Chowdhury

== Awards ==
Bangladesh National Film Awards

- Best Cinematographer – Baby Islam

Bachsas Awards

- Best Female Playback Singer – Samina Chowdhury

== Remake ==
Year	Title	Director	Cast	Note	Ref.
1998	Nayaner Alo	Swapan Saha	Prosenjit Chatterjee, Tapas Paul, Aditi Chatterjee, Indrani Halder, Sreelekha Mitra	Indian film	
