= 27th Bangladesh National Film Awards =

National Film Awards, Bangladesh

- Awarded for: Best of Bangladeshi cinema in 2002
- Awarded by: President of Bangladesh
- Presented by: Ministry of Information
- Presented on: 2004
- Site: Dhaka, Bangladesh
- Official website: moi.gov.bd

Highlights
- Best Feature Film: Hason Raja
- Best Actor: Kazi Maruf; Itihas
- Best Actress: Not Given
- Most awards: Hason Raja (7)

The 27th National Film Awards were presented by the Ministry of Information to recognize the best of Bangladeshi cinema released in 2002. The Bangladesh National Film Awards were established in 1975 by the government of Bangladesh. Each year, a national panel appointed by the government selects the winners, and the awards ceremony is held in Dhaka. A 12-member jury board headed by Sadeq Khan, chairman of the Board of Directors of the Press Institute of Bangladesh, recommended 17 artists for National Film Awards in recognition of their contributions to the country's film industry.

== List of winners ==
A total of 17 awards were given this year.

=== Merit awards ===
Name of Awards	Winner(s)	Film
Best Film	Helal Khan	Hason Raja
Best Director	Kazi Hayat	Itihas
Best Actor	Kazi Maruf	Itihas
Best Actress in a Supporting Role	Bobita	Hason Raja
Best Actor in a Negative Role	Helal Khan	Juari
Best Child Artist	Rasel Faroyezi	Matir Moyna
Best Music Director	Shujeo Shyam	Hason Raja
Best Music Composer	Alauddin Ali	Laal Doriya
Best Lyrics	Gazi Mazharul Anwar	Laal Doriya
Best Male Playback Singer	Monir Khan	Laal Doriya (Se Amar Bhalobasar Ayna)
Best Female Playback Singer	Uma Khan	Hason Raja

=== Technical awards ===
Name of Awards	Winner(s)	Film
Best Screenplay	Tareq Masud	Matir Moyna
Best Cinematography	Shahidullah Dulal	Hason Raja
Best Art Director	Uttam Guho	Hason Raja
Best Editing	Mujibur Rahman Dulu	Itihas
Best Makeup	Rahman	Hason Raja

=== Special award ===
- Best Child Artist (Special) - Nurul Islam Bablu (Matir Moyna)
- Best Child Artist (Special) -Jonas Ebadat

(Matir Moyna)

== See also ==
- Bachsas Awards
- Meril Prothom Alo Awards
- Ifad Film Club Award
- Babisas Award
