= Rafiqul Bari Chowdhury =

- রফিকুল বারী চৌধুরী
- Born: 1929 or 1930; Brahmanbaria
- Died: 8 May 2005 (aged 75); Dhaka, Bangladesh

Rafiqul Bari Chowdhury (c. 1930 – 8 May 2005) was a Bangladeshi cinematographer-turned-director. He won Bangladesh National Film Award for Best Cinematography four times for the films Golapi Ekhon Traine (1978), Dui Poisar Alta (1982), Heera Mati (1988) and Joyjatra (2004).

== Career ==
Chowdhury began his career as an assistant cameraman in Lahore in 1954, becoming a cameraman in his own right in 1960. He was the first camera operator of Bangladesh Television (BTV). In 1964, he was the cinematographer of Ferdausi Rahman's musical program on BTV.

He directed films Tansen (1970), Bhool Jokhmn Bhanglo (1974), and Pension, which was screened at the 1984 Indian Film Festival. Fred Marshall, writing about Bangladeshi cinema for the International Film Guide, called it "the most successful film ... of the past couple of years".

Chowdhury directed a short film, titled Bangla Ma-er Damal Chhele (1994), produced by Bangladesh Shishu Academy. Chowdhury had his own production company Jibon Shimantey.
