= Abu Hena Bablu =

Bangladeshi cinematographer

- আবু হেনা বাবলু
- Occupation: Cinematographer
- Years active: 1976–1997
- Notable work: Pita Mata Sontan; Oshikkhito
- Awards: National Film Awards (1st times)

Abu Hena Bablu is a Bangladeshi cinematographer. He won the Bangladesh National Film Award for Best Cinematography for the film Pita Mata Sontan (1991).

== Selected films ==
- Garmil - 1976
- Oshikkhito - 1978
- Gangchil - 1980
- Qurbani - 1985
- Ashanti - 1986
- Lalu Mastan - 1987
- Pita Mata Sontan - 1991
- Lokkhir Songsar - 1992
- Katha Dao - 1997

== Awards and nominations ==
National Film Awards

Year	Award	Category	Film	Result
1991	National Film Award	Best Cinematography	Pita Mata Sontan	Won
