= Khaleda Aktar Kolpona =

Bangladeshi actress

- খালেদা আক্তার কল্পনা
- Occupation: Actor
- Years active: 1984–present
- Awards: Bangladesh National Film Awards

Khaleda Aktar Kolpona is a Bangladeshi film actress. She also appeared in theater, modeling and drama. She won the Bangladesh National Film Award for Best Supporting Actress for her role in the film The Master of Jinns (1989).

== Filmography ==
- Tin Konya (1985)
- Dhaka 86 (1986)
- Sondhi (1987)
- Dayee Ke? (1987)
- Agomon (1988)
- Bir Pusrush (1988)
- Jiner Badsha (1989)
- Bobby (1990)
- Padma Meghna Jamuna (1991)
- Shontrash (1991)
- Lokkhir Songsar (1992)
- Chakor (1992)
- Ondho Prem (1993)
- Dola (1993)
- Keyamot Theke Keyamot (1993)
- Babar Adesh (1995)
- Ruti (1996)
- Palabi Kothay (1997)
- Anondo Osru (1997)
- Laal Badsha (1999)
- Shikari (2001)
- Bichchu Bahini (2001)
- Juari (2002)
- Bhalobasha Kare Koy (2002)
- Sahoshi Manush Chai (2003)
- Megher Pore Megh (2004)
- Lal Sabuj (2005)
- Dapot (2006)
- Swamir Sangshar (2007)
- Oshtrodhari Rana (2007)
- Bouyer Jala (2007)
- E Chokhe Shudui Tumi (2008)
- Akkel Alir Nirbachon (2008
- Bhalobashar Dushmon (2008)
- Mem Saheb (2008)
- Amar Praner Priya (2009)
- Swami Niye Judhyo (2008)
- Prithihibi Takar Goalm (2009)
- Surjer Ma Jamidar (2010)
- Bhalobaslei Ghor Bandha Jay Na (2010)
- Gahine Shabdo (2010)
- Ashtro Charo Kalom Dharo (2011)
- Tomar Sukhei Amar Sukh (2012)
- Don Number One (2012)
- Bangladeshi (2012)
- Buk Fatey To Mukh Foteyna (2012)
- Tomari Asi Tomari Thakbo (2013)
- 71 er Guerilla (2013)
- Tui Shudhu Amar (2014)
- NeelChokro (2025)

=== Television ===
- Empty Pocket
- Man Power
- Ural Ponkhi Mon
- Sonalu Ful Nilanjona
- Bayanno Golir Ek Gali
- Pani Judyo (Packege)
- Rabeya
- Nakshi Kathar Math (Telefilm)
- Bindu Noy Britto
- Bonofuler Ghran

== Awards ==
Year	Award	Category	Film	Result
1992	National Film Awards	Best Supporting Actor	The Master of Jinns	Won
