= Shammi Akhtar =

Bangladeshi playback singer (1957–2018)

Shammi Akhtar শাম্মী আখতার
- Born: Shamima Akhtar; 16 February 1957
- Died: 16 January 2018 (aged 60) Dhaka, Bangladesh
- Genre: Playback singer
- Years active: 1970–2018

Shammi Akhter (born Shamima Akhtar; 16 February 1957 – 16 January 2018) was a Bangladeshi playback singer. She was awarded the Bangladesh National Film Award for Best Female Playback Singer for the film Bhalobaslei Ghor Bandha Jay Na (2010).

== Early life ==
Akhter was trained by Ustad Gaur Babu.

== Career ==
She recorded her first song, Nazrul Sangeet “Eki Oporoop Roop-e Maa Tomaye”, for Bangladesh Betar in 1970. She came to public attention after recording the songs “Dhaka Shohor Aisha” and “Ami Jemon Achhi Temon Robo Bou Hobona Rey” for the film Ashikkhito.

Throughout her career, she helped produce approximately three hundred film songs including “Bidesh Giya Bondhu”, “Ei Raat Dake Oi Chand Dake”, “Amar Moner Bedona Bondhu Chhara Janena”, “Amar Baul Moner Ektara”, and “Amar Naye Paar Hoite Lage Sholoana”.

== Discography ==
Year	Film	Song-title	Co-singer(s)	Composer	
1978	Ashikkhito	"Dhaka Shohor Aisha Amar"	Khondokar Faruk Ahmed	Satya Saha	
1979	Aradhona	"Ami Tomar Bodhu" "Chithi Diyo Protidin"		Alam Khan	
1979	Bela Shesher Gaan	"Bondhu Dimuna Jaite"	Khandaker Nurul Alam	Subir Nandi	
1979	Matir Ghor	"Amar Naye Paar Hoite"	Subir Nandi	Satya Saha	
1979	The Father	"Ami Ki Gaibo Gaan"		Azad Rahman	
1981	Nagin	"Gokhra Re Gokhra"	Deboo Bhattacharya	Sheikh Nazrul Islam	Runa Laila
1982	Boro Bhalo Lok Chhilo	"Chamelir Tel Diya"	Alam Khan	Bipul	
1982	Kajal Lata	"Ei Raat Dake"	Subir Nandi	Khondaker Nurul Alam	
1986	Ashirbad	"Ghorer Kachhe Golap Gachhe"	Alam Khan	Syed Shamsul Haque	solo
1987	Sondhi	"Jhilmil Jhilmil Korchhe Raat" (female)	Satya Saha	Gazi Mazharul Anwar	solo
1988	Bhai Amar Bhai	"Bhai Amar Bhai" (version 1)	Anwar Jahan Nantu	Alamgir Kabir	Sabina Yasmin
1988	Bhai Amar Bhai	"Bhai Amar Bhai" (version 2)	Anwar Jahan Nantu	Alamgir Kabir	Sabina Yasmin
1989	Alomoti Premkumar	"Alo Chhere Chhilam Andhokare"	Subal Das	M. A. Khan Sobuj	Syed Abdul Hadi
1989	Alomoti Premkumar	"Rajar Chhele Tai, Mone Bhorosa Na Pai"	Subal Das	M. A. Khan Sobuj	Syed Abdul Hadi
1991	Satya Mithya	"Mondo Hok, Bhalo Hok"	Alam Khan	Moniruzzaman Monir	solo
2010	Bhalobaslei Ghor Bandha Jay Na	"Bhalobaslei Ghar Bandha Jay Na" (earned Bangladesh National Film Award for Best Female Playback Singer)		Sheikh Sadi Khan	
		"Bidesh Giya Bondhu Tumi Vuilona"	Satya Saha		
	Chuto Maa	"Mone Boro Asha Chhilo"			
		"Tomar Kache Ele Poran"			
		"Gharer Kachhe Golap Gachhe"			
		"Nag Mohol"			
		"Ashirbad"			
		"Amar Moner Bedona"			
	Matir Ghor	"Amar Naye Paar Hoite"			
		"Amar Baul Moner Aktarata"			
		"Amay Eto Bhalobeshona"			
		"Ami Brishite Bheja"			
		"Kakhono Jeona Chole"			
	Oshikkito	"Master Shab Ami Naam"			
		"Mone Hoy Hajar Bachhor"			
		"Oi Chand Duiba Jay"			
		"Shuktara"			
		"Sobai To Bachte Chay"			
		"TumI Je Amar Prem"			
		"Tumi Kotha Bolar Chhole"			
		"Akasher Hate Ache Ekrash Nil"			

Non-film songs

Year	Album	Song-title	Co-singer(s)	Composer
N/A	Single	"Tomake Peye Phuralo Je Sokol Chaowa Amar"	solo	Lucky Akhand
N/A	Single	"Monehoy Hazaar Bochhor Dhore"	solo	Sheikh Sadi Khan

== Personal life ==
Akhter married folk singer Akramul Islam in 1977. They have a son and a daughter.

Akhter died on January 16, 2018, at age 60, after a five-year battle with breast cancer.
