= Simana Periye =

- Poster
- Directed by: Alamgir Kabir
- Screenplay by: Alamgir Kabir
- Produced by: AKM Jahangir Khan
- Starring: Jayshree Kabir; Tanuja; Bulbul Ahmed
- Music by: Bhupen Hazarika
- Release date: 1977
- Country: Bangladesh
- Language: Bengali

Simana Periye (Bengali: সীমানা পেরিয়ে) is a 1977 Bangladeshi film directed by Alamgir Kabir, and starring Jayshree Kabir, Bulbul Ahmed and Bollywood actress Tanuja alongside a few others. Ahmed garnered Bangladesh National Film Award for Best Actor for his performance in the film.

== Cast ==
- Tanuja
- Bulbul Ahmed
- Jayshree Kabir
- Golam Mustafa
- Kaffey Khan
- Maya Hazarika

=== Soundtrack ===
#	Song-title	Singer(s)	Lyricist	Composer	Picturised on	Note(s)
১	Bimurto Ei Ratri Amar	Abida Sultana	Shibdas Bandyopadhyay	Bhupen Hazarika	Jayshree Kabir	
২	Megh Thom Thom Kore	Bhupen Hazarika	Shibdas Bandyopadhyay	Bhupen Hazarika		
৩	Aaj Jyotsna Rate	Abida Sultana	Rabindranath Tagore	Rabindranath Tagore		

== Awards ==
Bangladesh National Film Awards

- Best Actor – Bulbul Ahmed
- Best Screenplay – Alamgir Kabir
- Best Dialogue – Alamgir Kabir
