= Bhalobaslei Ghor Bandha Jay Na =

Bangladeshi drama film

- Film poster
- Directed by: Jakir Hossain Raju
- Written by: Jakir Hossain Raju
- Produced by: Mastex Production
- Starring: Shakib Khan; Apu Biswas; Rumana; Misha Sawdagar; Ali Raj; Don
- Music by: Ali Akram Shuvo
- Production company: BFDC
- Distributed by: Mastex Production
- Release date: 14 May 2010
- Running time: 160 minutes
- Country: Bangladesh
- Language: Bengali

Bhalobaslei Ghor Bandha Jay Na (Bengali: ভালবাসলেই ঘর বাঁধা যায় না) (transl. Home can't be settled by Love), is a 2010 Dhallywood drama film directed by Jakir Hossain Raju, who also wrote the story and screenplay, and produced by Mastex Production. The film stars Shakib Khan, Apu Biswas and Rumana. It was highly successful, critically and commercially. The film won seven National Film Awards including Best Actor and two Meril Prothom Alo Awards. Shakib Khan won his first Bangladesh National Film Awards for this film.

== Cast ==
- Shakib Khan as Surjo Khan
- Apu Biswas as Alo
- Rumana Khan as Ojanta
- Misha Sawdagor as Turjo Khan
- Kazi Hayat
- Khaleda Akter Kolpona
- Ali Raj
- Prabir Mitra
- Arjumand Ara Bokul
- Afzal Sharif
- Chikon Ali
- Rimu Roja Khandokar
- Kala Aziz

== Soundtrack ==
Bhalobaslei Ghor Bandha Jay Na

Soundtrack album by Ali Akram Shuvo
- Released: 2010
- Genre: Feature film soundtrack
- Producer: Mastex Production

The soundtrack of Bhalobaslei Ghor Bandha Jay Na was directed by Ali Akram Shuvo and composed by Sheikh Sadi Khan.

=== Track listing ===
No.	Title	Artist(s)	Length
1.	"Buker Bhitor"	S I Tutul & Nancy
2.	"Bhalobashlei Ghor"	Shammi Akhtar
3.	"Krishno Hobo"	Reshad
4.	"Jodi Proshno Karo"	Andrew Kishore & Kanok Chapa
5.	"Chintay Chintay"	Kanok Chapa
6.	"Buker Bhitor(Sad)"	S. I. Tutul & Nancy

== Box office ==
- The film was the 2nd highest-grossing film of 2010 after Number One Shakib Khan, another Shakib Khan-starrer.

== Home media ==
The DVD and VCD of the film were released in 2011 by Anupom.

== Accolades ==
National Film Award - 2010

- won. Best actor: Shakib Khan
- won. Best Supporting Actress: Rumana Khan
- won. Best Screenplay & writer: Jakir Hossain Raju
- won. Best Male Playback Singer: S.I. Tutul for: Buker Bhitor
- won. Best FeMale Playback Singer: Shammi Akhtar for: Bhalobaslei Ghor Bandha Jay Na
- won. Best music composer : Sheikh Sadi Khan

Meril Prothom Alo Awards - 2010

- won. Best actor: Shakib Khan
- Nominated. Best actress: Apu Biswas
- won. Best Supporting Actress: Rumana
