= Shuvoda =

- DVD cover for Shuvoda
- শুভদা
- Directed by: Chashi Nazrul Islam
- Written by: Sarat Chandra Chattopadhyay
- Screenplay by: Z.H. Mintu
- Produced by: AKM Jahangir Khan
- Starring: Anwara; Golam Mustafa; Razzak; Jinat; Bulbul Ahmed
- Cinematography: Sadhan Roy
- Edited by: Khorshed Alam
- Distributed by: BFDC
- Release date: 1986
- Running time: 126 minutes
- Country: Bangladesh
- Language: Bengali

Shuvoda (Bengali: শুভদা) is a 1986 Bangladeshi Bengali-language film directed by Chashi Nazrul Islam based on Sarat Chandra Chattopadhyay's novel of the same name.

== Plot ==
Haran's (Golam Mustafa) family consists of his wife Shuvoda (Anwara), two daughters - Lolona and Chholona, one son Madhab, and a widowed sister. Lolona becomes widowed after one month of marriage and is sent back to her father's home. Haran is addicted to gambling and lives from hand to mouth.

== Cast ==
- Anwara - Shuvoda
- Golam Mustafa - Haran
- Bulbul Ahmed - Zaminder
- Razzak - Sodanondo
- Jinat - Lolona

== Soundtrack ==
The music of this film was directed by Khondokar Nurul Alam and the lyrics were penned by Mohammad Rafiquzzaman and Nazrul Islam Babu. Nilufar Yasmin, Sabina Yasmin, Subir Nandi and Nazmul Huda sang in this film.

- Eto Sukh Soibe Kemon Kore - Nilufar Yasmin

== Awards ==
| Award Title | Category | Awardee | Result |
|---|---|---|---|
| National Film Awards | Best Film | A. K. M. Jahangir Khan (Producer) | Won |
| National Film Awards | Best Director | Chashi Nazrul Islam | Won |
| National Film Awards | Best Actor | Golam Mustafa | Won |
| National Film Awards | Best Actress | Anwara | Won |
| National Film Awards | Best Actress in a Supporting Role | Jinat | Won |
| National Film Awards | Best Music Director | Khandaker Nurul Alam | Won |
| National Film Awards | Best Lyrics | Mohammad Moniruzzaman | Won |
| National Film Awards | Best Male Playback Singer | Subir Nandi | Won |
| National Film Awards | Best Female Playback Singer | Nilufar Yasmin | Won |
| National Film Awards | Best Cinematography (Black and White) | Sadhan Roy | Won |
| National Film Awards | Best Cinematography (Color) | Sadhan Roy | Won |
| National Film Awards | Best Editing | Abdus Sabur | Won |
| National Film Awards | Best Sound Editing | MA Baset | Won |
