= Bulbul Ahmed =

Bangladeshi actor and director (1940–2010)

- বুলবুল আহমেদ
- Born: Tabarruk Ahmed; 4 September 1940; Medinipur, Bengal Presidency, British India
- Died: 15 July 2010 (aged 69); Dhaka, Bangladesh
- Education: University of Dhaka
- Occupations: Actor, director, producer
- Years active: 1965-2009

Bulbul Ahmed (born Tabarruk Ahmed; 4 September 1940 – 15 July 2010) was a Bangladeshi actor and director. He received the Bangladesh National Film Award for Best Actor three times, for his roles in the films Shimana Periye (1977), Badhu Biday (1978), and Shesh Uttar (1980). He also produced the film Rajlakshmi Srikanta (1987), which won the Bangladesh National Film Award for Best Film.

== Early life and career ==
Ahmed's father, Khalil Ahmed, was a government employee and an amateur actor. Ahmed started his acting career through stage drama in 1965. He began acting in television roles in 1968. He first appeared in films in 1973 as a supporting actor in Iye Korey Biye. He directed a total of four films, Rajlakshmi Srikanta (1987), Akarshan, Gorom Hawa and Koto Je Apon. He also produced a film titled Jibon Niye Jua.

== Filmography ==
=== Films ===
- Iye Korey Biye (1973)
- Dhire Bohe Meghna (1973)
- Surjo Konna (1975)
- Jibon Niye Jua
- Shimana Periye (1977)
- Rupali Shoikotey (1979)
- Bhalo Manush (1981) as Sumon Ahmed
- Mohona (1982)
- Mahanayak (1985)
- Dipu Number Two (1996)
- Devdas (1987)
- Shesh Uttar
- Badhu Biday
- Bodnaani
- Jonmo Theke Jolchi
- Nawab Siraj Ud Doulla
- Dui Jibon
- RajLaxmi Srikanto (1987)
- The Father
- Shuvoda (1986)
- Jibon Chabi (1999)
- Wada
- Valo Manush
- Akorshon
- Gorom Haowa
- Koto Je Apon
- Dui Noyoner Alo

=== Serial dramas ===
- Ei Shob Din Ratri

== Personal life and death ==
Ahmed was married to actress Daisy Ahmed. Together they had three children, Wasif Ahmed Shubho, Tahsin Farzana Tilottoma and Tazrin Farhana Oindrila.

Ahmed died on 15 July 2010 in Square Hospital in Dhaka. He was suffering from diabetes and cardiac diseases.
