= Sabina Yasmin =

Bangladeshi singer (born 1954)

- সাবিনা ইয়াসমিন
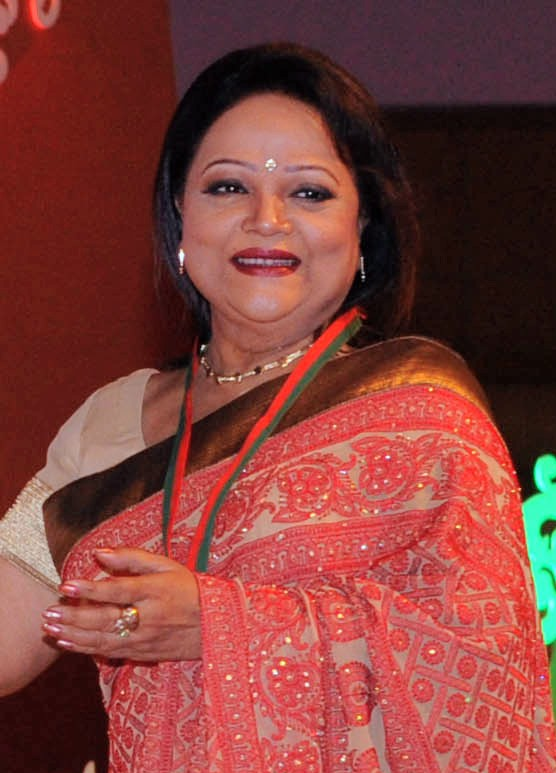
- Yasmin in 2015
- Pronunciation: [sabina i̯asmin]
- Born: 4 September 1954 (age 72); Dacca, East Bengal, Dominion of Pakistan
- Education: University of Dhaka
- Occupation: Playback singer
- Years active: 1967–present
- Spouses: Anisur Rahman (divorced); Amir Hossain Babu (divorced); Kabir Suman (m. 2000)
- Children: 2
- Relatives: Farida Yasmin (sister); Nilufar Yasmin (sister); Khan Ataur Rahman (brother-in-law); Agun (nephew)
- Awards: Full list

Sabina Yasmin (Note: pronounced [sabina i̯asmin].) (Bengali: [sabina i̯asmin]; born 4 September 1954) is a Bangladeshi singer. She is best known as a playback singer in Bengali cinema. She has won the Bangladesh National Film Award for Best Female Playback Singer a record 14 times. She has recorded more than 12,000 songs for films and more than 15,000 songs in total.

Yasmin was awarded Ekushey Padak in 1984 and the Independence Day Award in 1996 by the government of Bangladesh.

== Early life ==
Yasmin was born on 4 September 1954 in Dhaka. Her ancestral home is in Satkhira. Her father, Lutfar Rahman, worked in the Provincial Civil Service of British Raj, and her mother, Begum Mouluda Khatun, was a vocal artist who took lessons from the musician Ustaad Kader Baksh. Yasmin is the youngest of the five sisters; her elder sisters are singers Farida Yasmin, Fauzia Yasmin, Nazma Yasmin, and Nilufar Yasmin. The first song that Yasmin learned with the household harmonium was Khokon Moni Shona. In 1964, she sang regularly in Khela Ghar, a radio programme. P.C. Gomez was her classical music mentor. Musician Altaf Mahmud discovered her singing voice while visiting her neighbour's house. She made her debut in playback singing through the song Modhu Jochnar Dipali for the film Agun Niye Khela (1967), directed by Amjad Hossain and Nurul Haque Bacchu. As child artists, she and Shahnaz Rahmatullah won awards from President Ayub Khan.

== Career ==
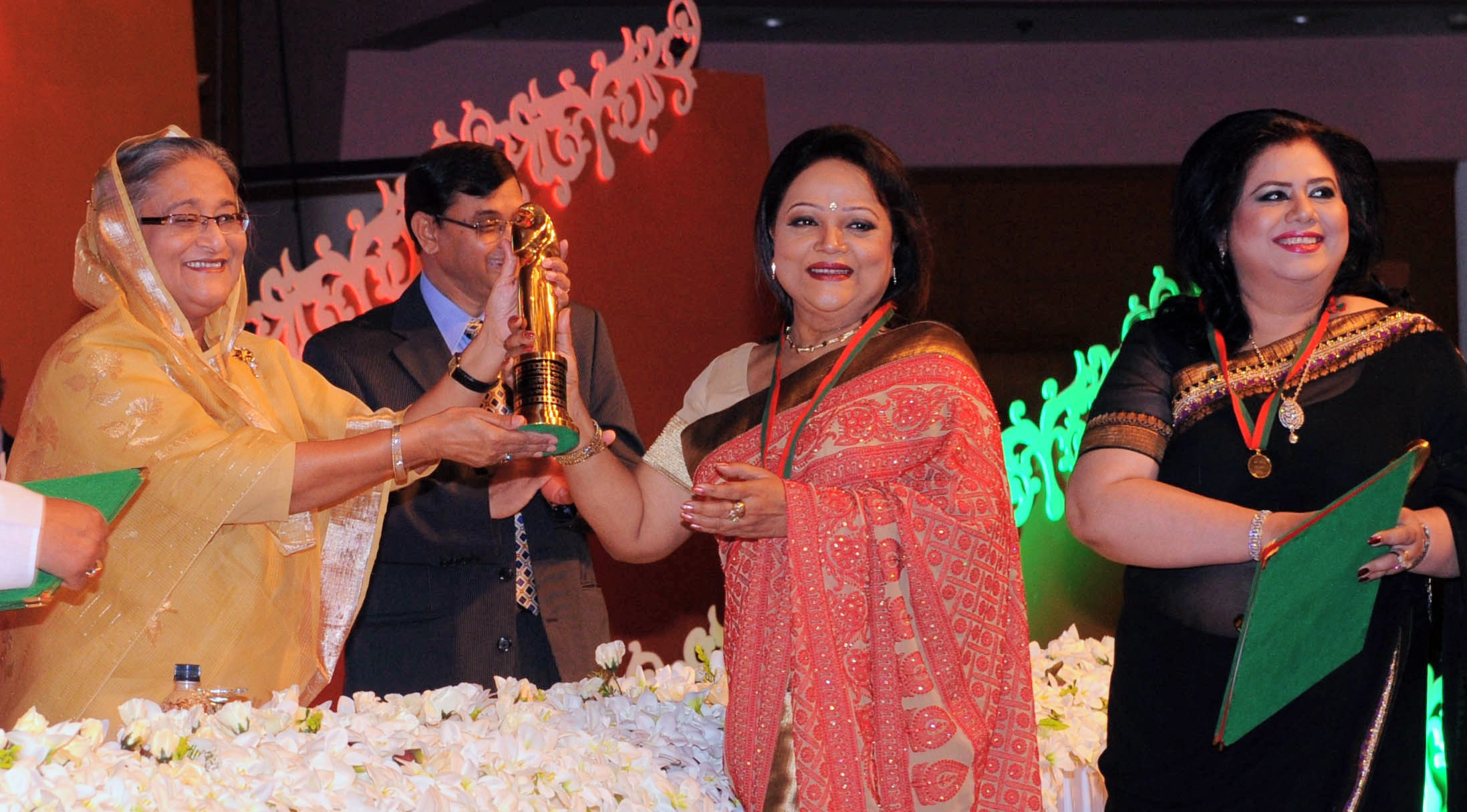
Yasmin and Runa Laila receiving awards from Sheikh Hasina at Bangladesh National Film Awards ceremony in 2015.

Yasmin got her first breakthrough through the song titled Shudhu Gaan Geye Porichoy. She then started working under Altaf Mahmud in films including Anowara, Nayantara and Taka Ana Pai. She gradually performed along with Satya Saha, Subal Das, Khan Ataur Rahman, Alauddin Ali, Ahmed Imtiaz Bulbul and Gazi Mazharul Anwar.

=== 1960s ===
Yasmin has sung for films, radio, television and gramophone companies. She started her career in the Pakistan film industry and gained recognition when she sang a duet with Ahmed Rushdi Baharon ki yeh shaam for film Anari (1969).

=== 1970s ===
When Yasmin entered the film industry, her co-eval Shahnaz Rahmatullah was the number one singer. In 1970, the film Jibon Theke Neya was released. It contained the song "Eki Sonar Aloy" which elevated Yasmin as the leading singer. She sang some patriotic songs: "Sob Kota Janala", "Swajan Harano Diner Samarane", "Sei Railliner Dhare", "Swadhinata Tumi", etc. She garnered fame with the song "Sudhu Gaan Geye Porichoy" in the 1972 film 'Abujh Mon'. She sang "Tumi Je Amar Kobita", "Tumi Achho", etc. duets with Mahmudunnabi. She received the first Bangladesh National Film Award for Best Female Playback Singer in 1975 for her songs in Sujon Sokhi. She received three consecutive National film awards: in 1978 for Golapi Ekhon Train E; in 1979 for Sundari; and in 1980 for Kosai.

=== 1980s ===
She sang numerous such hits as "Koto Sadhonay Emon Bhagyo Mele", "Shoto Jonomer Sadh", "E Jibone Tumi Ogo Ele" and many more. Her rising popularity dragged her to Indian cinema. In 1985, she sang "Cherona Cherona Haat" and "Jalpari" with Kishore Kumar in the Indo-Bangladesh joint production Anyay Abichar which had music by R. D. Burman.

=== 1990s ===
Yasmin earned National Awards in 1991 for Danga and 1992 for Radha Krishna. In 1994, Kanak Chapa came to the music scene with the film Tomakei Chai.

=== 2000s ===
By the year 2000, Kanak Chapa was already the most sought-after playback singer. Yet Yasmin got to sing numerous hit songs composed by top-notch music directors. She achieved a National Film Award for her rendition of "Boroshar Prothom Dine" in Dui Duari (2000). In 2004, her song "Preme Poreche Mon" in 'wrong number' topped the music top charts. She achieved her 12th and last National Film Award for 'Dui Noyoner Alo'.

=== 2010s ===
Yasmin sang a duet with the winner of Channel-I Sera Kontho, Imran. In these years she sang for a new generation of actresses like Apu Biswas, Sahara, Racy and others. Her song "Premiker Buk Jeno Sukher Nodi" featured in top charts for many weeks.

== Personal life ==
Yasmin has married three times. She has a daughter, Yasmin Fairuz Bandhan, a singer, from her first marriage with Anisur Rahman, and a son, Rafi Hossain Srabon, from her second marriage with Bangladesh National Film Awards-winning dance choreographer Amir Hossain Babu. In 1998, she met Kabir Suman, an Indian-Bengali musician and political activist, and later the couple got married.

In July 2007, Yasmin was diagnosed with non-Hodgkin lymphoma. She was admitted to Labaid Hospital on 12 June. Doctors found that she was suffering from an infection of the spleen. An emergency operation took place on 21 June. But her health didn't improve. She flew to Singapore for better treatment on 11 July. After having treatment for three and a half months, she returned to Bangladesh.

== Works ==
Popular songs

- "Cherona Cherona Haat"
- "Jalpari"
- "E Jibone Tumi Ogo Ele"
- "Koto Sadhonay"
- "Shoto Jonomer Swapno"
- "O Majhi Nao Chhaira De
- "Majhi Nao Chhaira De Choluk Mach Dhoira Diya"
- "Ei Mon Tomake Dilam"
- "Shukher Pakhi Re"
- "Tumi Boro Bhagyoboti"
- "Boroshar Prothom Dine"
- "Moneri Range Rangabo"
- "Shudhu Gaan Geyei Pirichoy"
- "Ekbar Jete Dena" (compilation)
- "O Amar Rosiya"
- "Ei Prithibir Pore"
- "Mohakal Seto Akul Mahasamudra"
- "Swajon Harano Diner Smarane"
- "Sei Railliner Dhare"
- "Ek Je Chhilo Meye Tar Poribanu Naam"
- "Shadhinota Tumi"
- "Sundor Suborno"
- "Amar Hridoyer Aina"
- "Tumi Je Amar Kabita"
- "Boner Kokil"
- "Premiker Buk Jeno Sukher Nodi"
- "Amar Mon Kande"
- "Kaunse Dariya" (Hindi)
- "Ami Rajanigandha"
- "Badla Dine"
- "Achar Khaile Bhuchar Hobe"
- "Baba Bole Gelo"
- "Eki Sonar Aloy"
- "Ekdin Chhuti Hobe"
- "Amay Jodi Proshno Koro Hira Motir Desh"
- "Sob Kota Janala"
- "Jodi Raat Pohale Shona Jeto"

Filmography

- Jibon Theke Neya (1970)
- Abujh Mon (1972)
- Ora Egaro Jon (1972)
- Titas Ekti Nodir Naam (1972)
- Orunodoyer Ogni Sakkhi (1973)
- Otithi (1973)
- Dhire Bohe Meghna (1973)
- Masud Rana (1973)
- Swarolipi (1974)
- Chokher Joley (1974)
- Beiman (1974)
- Abar Tora Manush Ho (1974)
- Alor Michil (1974)
- Shujon Sokhi (1974)
- Shadhu Shoytan (1975)
- Badi Theke Golam (1975)
- O Bondhu (1976)
- Rajmahal (1976)
- Shomadhi (1976)
- Ki Je Kori (1976)
- Anirban(1976)
- Chondro Hariye Gelo (1976)
- Miss Lanka (1977)
- Ashami (1977)
- Ashikkhito (1977)
- Mustafiz (1977)
- Jadur Bashi (1977)
- Golapi Ekhon Traine (1978)
- Rosher Baidani (1978)
- Alankar (1978)
- Sareng Bou (1978)
- Chokher Moni (1978)
- Pratinidhi (1979)
- Matir Ghar (1979)
- Joker (1979)
- Sonar Cheye Dami (1979)
- Sundari (1979)
- Abirbhab (1980)
- Simana Periye (1980)
- Matir Manush (1980)
- Kosai (1980)
- Abhiman (1980)
- Anarkali (1980)
- Emiler Goyenda Bahini (1980)
- Chhutir Ghonta (1980)
- Shukhe Thako (1981)
- Shahar Theke Dure (1981)
- Bokul Phuler Mala (1981)
- Sohag Milan (1981)
- Sot Ma (1981)
- Bondini (1981)
- Devdas (1982)
- Desh Pardesh (1982)
- Ronger Manush (1982)
- Rajnigandha (1982)
- Bhat De (1982)
- Boro Bhalo Lok Chilo (1982)
- Palki (1983)
- Mayer Dowa (1983)
- Bini Sutar Mala (1983)
- Shasti (1984)
- Mahanayak (1984)
- Rakhe Allah Mare Ke (1984)
- Rajlokkhi Srikanto (1984)
- Chor (1985)
- Ranga Bhabi (1985)
- Anyay Abichar (1985)
- Tin Konya (1986)
- Bicharpati (1986)
- Dui Poisar Alta (1986)
- Loraku (1986)
- Sontrash (1986)
- Shondhi (1987)
- Kajer Beti Rahima (1987)
- Shakkhor (1988)
- Beder Meye Jyotsna (1989)
- Shorto (1989)
- Ekdin Tomay Na Dekhile (1989)
- Swadhin (1990)
- Fire Fire Asi (1991)
- Chokher Pani (1991)
- Padma Meghna Jamuna (1991)
- Rupban (1991)
- Beder Meye Jyotsna (1991)
- Shradhha (1992)
- Somor (1992)
- Shankhanil Karagar (1992)
- Premer Nam Bedona (1992)
- Keyamot Theke Keyamot (1993)
- Tomakey Chai (1994)
- Bikkhov (1994)
- Don (1994)
- Khudha (1994)
- Sneha (1995)
- Ananda Asru (1995)
- Satyer Mrityu Nei (1995)
- Banglar Nayok (1995)
- Dipu Number Two (1996)
- Hangar Nadi Grenade (1997)
- Behind (1997)
- Praner Cheye Priyo (1997)
- Swapner Nayok (1998)
- Swapner Prithibi (1998)
- Amma (1998)
- Paradhin (1998)
- Biyer Phul (1999)
- Madam Fuli (1999)
- Ammajan (1999)
- Ragi (1999)
- O Priya Tumi Kothay (2000)
- Itihas (2001)
- Hason Raja (2002)
- Artonad (2002)
- Phul Nebo Na Osru Nebo (2003)
- Wrong Number (2004)
- Megher Opare Megh (2004)
- Hajar Bachhar Dhore (2005)
- Molla Barir Bou (2005)
- Sajghar (2006)
- Jiboner Golpo (2006)
- Ek Takar Bou (2007)
- Ei Je Duniya (2007)
- Megher Koley Rod (2008)
- Pashaner Prem (2008)
- Meye Sakkhi (2008)
- Ki Jadu Korila (2008)
- Swami Bhagya (2012)
- Tomar Sukhei Amar Sukh (2012)
- Judge Barrioster Commissioner (2013)
- Tumi Sei Anamika (2013)
- Nishpap Munna (2013)
- Rupgawal (2013)
- Jiban Nadir Teere (2013)
- Shabnam (2014)
- Kusumpurer Golpo (2014)
- Moner Ajante (2015)

== Awards ==
Bangladesh National Film Award for Best Female Playback Singer

- 1975 – Sujon Sokhi
- 1978 – Golapi Ekhon Traine
- 1979 – Sundari
- 1980 – Kosai
- 1984 – Chandranath
- 1985 – Premik
- 1987 – Rajlakshmi Srikanto
- 1988 – Dui Jibon
- 1991 – Danga
- 1992 – Radha Krishna
- 2000 – Aaj Gaye Holud
- 2005 – Dui Noyoner Alo
- 2012 – Devdas
- 2018 – Putro

Others

- 1984 – Ekushey Padak
- 1996 – Independence Day Award
- 2016 – Firoza Begum Gold Medal
- 2022 - Meril Prothom Alo Lifetime Achievement Awards
- 2026 - 5th BIFA Lifetime Achievement Awards

== Notes ==
https://open.spotify.com/artist/4XNJYJOFFjzbvBup4j2g9a==References==

https://open.spotify.com/artist/4XNJYJOFFjzbvBup4j2g9a==External links==

- Sabina Yasmin at IMDb
