= Mukti =

Mukti (Devanagari: मुक्ति) is the concept of spiritual liberation (Moksha or Nirvana) in Indian religions, including jivan mukti, para mukti.

Mukti may also refer to:

== Film ==
- Mukti (1937 film), a Hindi and Bengali-language Indian film
- Mukti (1960 film), an Indian film starring Nalini Jaywant
- Mukti Asm, a 1973 Assamese-language film, to which the Indian classical singer Parveen Sultana contributed a song
- Mukti (1977 film), a Hindi-language Indian film
- Mukti (Oriya film), a 1977 Odia-language Indian film that won the Odisha State Film Award for Best Actress
- Mukthi, a 1988 Indian film
- Mukti (TV series), a 2022 Indian Bengali-language web series

== Music ==
- Mukti (album), a 1997 studio-duo album by Zubeen Garg and Jonkie Borthakur

== People ==
- Mukti Ali (1923–2004), Indonesian government minister
- Mukti Mohan (born 1987), Indian dancer and actress
- Mukti (actress), actress in the 2002 Bengali-language Bangladeshi film Hason Raja
- Mukti Ali Raja, Indonesian footballer in the 2012 Liga Indonesia Premier Division Final
- Mukti Bahadur Khadka, Nepalese runner in the 2014 Asian Games
- Mukti Lal, Indian member of the 1967 Rajasthan legislative assembly from Neem Ka Thana
- Mukti Nath Bhatta, Nepalese ambassador to Denmark
- Mukti Pathak, Nepalese marathon runner in the 1995 Summer Universiade
- Mukti Prasad Sharma, Nepalese politician in the legislative elections of Nepal 1994 and 1999
- Mukti Roy, Indian runner in the 2000 IAAF World Cross Country Championships
- Mukti Saha, Indian runner in the 2002 Asian Athletics Championships

== Other ==
- Mukti (magazine), British feminist magazine
- Mukti (newspaper), a weekly newspaper in Purulia, West Bengal, India

== See also ==
- Moksha (disambiguation)
- Mukta (disambiguation)
