= Nirvana (disambiguation) =

Nirvana is a concept in Indian religious traditions.

Nirvana may also refer to:

== Philosophical concepts ==
- Nirvana (Buddhism)
- Moksha (Jainism), the terms Nirvana and Moksha mean same in Jainism

== Biology ==
- Nirvana (leafhopper), a leafhopper genus established by Kirkaldy in 1900
- Nirvana, a butterfly genus established in 1979, now known as Nirvanopsis

== Ships ==
- USS Nirvana (SP-706), later USS SP-706, a United States Navy patrol vessel in commission in 1917 and from 1918 to 1919
- USS Nirvana II, a United States Navy patrol vessel in commission from 1917 to 1918

== Music ==
=== Bands ===
- Nirvana (band), an American grunge band (1987–1994)
- Nirvana (British band), a British psychedelic band (1967–2026)
- Nirvana (Yugoslav band), a Yugoslav progressive rock band (1970–1976)
- Nirvana 2002, a Swedish death metal band (1988–1991)

=== Albums ===
- Nirvana (Herbie Mann and the Bill Evans Trio album), 1964
- Nirvana (Charles Lloyd album), 1968
- Nirvana (Zoot Sims and Bucky Pizzarelli album), 1974
- Nirvana (Bucky Pizzarelli album), 1995
- Nirvana (Nirvana album), 2002
- Nirvana (Inna album), 2017
- Nirvana (EP), a 2013 EP by Sam Smith

=== Songs ===
- "Nirvana" (Inna song), 2017
- "Nirvana" (Jelena Rozga song), 2013
- "Nirvana", by Herbie Mann and the Bill Evans Trio from the album Nirvana, 1964
- "Nirvana", by Zoot Sims and Bucky Pizzarelli from the album Nirvana, 1974
- "Nirvana", by the Cult from the album Love, 1985
- "Nirvana", by the Childrens Choir of Elbosco from the 1995 album Angelis
- "Nirvana", by Elemeno P from the album Love & Disrespect, 2002
- "Nirvana", by Adam Lambert from the album Trespassing, 2012
- "Nirvana", by Mucc from the album Shangri-La, 2012
- "Nirvana", by Sam Smith from the EP Nirvana, 2013
- "Nirvana", by Azealia Banks, 2021
- "Nirvana", by Katy Perry from the album 143, 2024

== Other creative works ==
- Nirwana, a book compiled by E. L. de Marigny, Jaime Martijn, and Annemarie Kindt, illustrated by Carl Lundgren, and Alicia Austin
- Nirvana (1997 film), an Italian science fiction cyberpunk movie
- Nirvana (2008 film), a Russian drama movie starring Olga Sutulova
- "Nirvana", a poem by Charles Bukowski, first published in 1991
- Nirvana the Band the Show, a Canadian mockumentary web series about the fictional band "Nirvana the Band"
- Nirvanna the Band the Show, a television adaptation of the above web series
- Nirvanna the Band the Show the Movie, a feature film based on both the web and TV series

== Fictional elements ==
- Mechanus, also known as Nirvana, a Lawful Neutral spiritually aligned outer plane in Dungeons & Dragons
- Nirvana, a fictional spaceship in the anime series Vandread (ヴァンドレッド, Vandoreddo)
- Nirvana, a magical item in the anime series Fairy Tail (フェアリーテイル, Fearī Teiru) used by the character Oración Seis

== Other ==
- Nirvana (software), metadata, data placement and data management software
- Nirvana Apartments, a historic apartment hotel in Los Angeles, California
- Mount Nirvana, the unofficial name of the highest mountain in the Northwest Territories, Canada
- NEdit, the "Nirvana editor", a text editor for the X Window System

== See also ==
- Moksha (disambiguation), another similar concept of Indian religions
