= Foreign relations of the Faroe Islands =

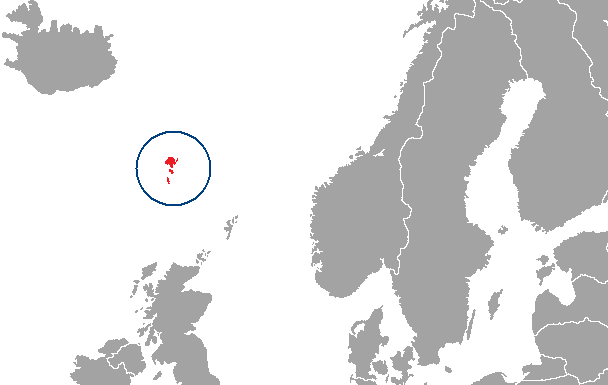
Location of the Faroe Islands

Being part of the Kingdom of Denmark, the foreign relations of the Faroe Islands are handled by the government of the Faroe Islands in conjunction with the Danish government.

Unlike Denmark, the Faroe Islands is not a part of the European Union. Although individuals born in the Faroe Islands become Danish citizens at birth, Danish citizens who are residents in the Faroe Islands are not formally citizens of the EU. However, because the Faroe Islands is part of the Kingdom of Denmark, there is still a closer link to the EU via the special legal framework surrounding the foreign relations of the Faroe Islands compared with other countries outside the EU.

As an illustrative example, individuals born in the Faroe Islands have the individual choice of holding a Danish or Faroese passport according to article 10 in the Home Rule Act of 1948. In practice, this means that individuals born in the Faroe Islands are provided with the same rights to travel inside the EU as Danish citizens born in Denmark.

== General relations ==
The High Commission of Denmark in the Faroe Islands represents the Danish government on the Islands.

The current Minister of Foreign Affairs and Fisheries and Deputy Prime Minister of the Faroe Islands is Bárður á Steig Nielsen.

=== Diplomatic missions ===
- Mission of the Faroes to the European Union, Brussels
- Representation of the Faroes, Copenhagen
- Representation of the Faroe Islands, London
- Representation of the Faroe Islands, Moscow
- Representation of the Faroe Islands to Israel, Tel Aviv
- Representation of the Faroes, Reykjavík
- Representation of Faroe Islands, Beijing
- Representation of Faroe Islands, Washington, D.C.

=== Membership in international organisations ===
- Baltic Sea Parliamentary Conference
- Food and Agriculture Organization (associate member)
- International Maritime Organization (associate member)
- North Atlantic Marine Mammal Commission
- UNESCO (associate member)
- West Nordic Council

=== Treaties ===
- Free trade agreements with Norway, Switzerland, Turkey, and the United Kingdom.
- Fisheries agreements with Greenland, Iceland, Norway and Russia.
- Hoyvík Agreement, guaranteeing full freedom of movement for goods, services, capital and people between the Faroes and Iceland.

== The Legal Framework ==
The legal framework governing the Faroe Islands' external relations is based on a series of constitutional arrangements that position the Faroe Islands within the Kingdom of Denmark. These arrangements define the division of powers between the Faroese and Danish authorities and explain why the Faroe Islands is able to conduct certain aspects of their foreign relations independently, despite remaining part of the Danish Realm.

The constitutional basis was established with the Home Rule Act of 1948, which fundamentally redefined the relationship between the Faroe Islands and Denmark. Before 1948, the Faroe Islands was administered directly by Denmark. The Home Rule Act granted the Faroe Islands extensive self-government while maintaining its status within the Kingdom of Denmark. The Act introduced a formal distinction between special Faroese matters, over which the Faroese authorities exercise autonomous competence, and common matters, which remain under the responsibility of the Danish authorities.

The constitutional framework was expanded with the Takeover Act of 2005, which enables the Faroese authorities to assume legislative and executive responsibility for almost any policy area through a political decision in the Faroe Islands. However, certain areas are explicitly excluded from transfer, including matters relating to the Danish Constitution, citizenship, the Supreme Court, defence, security, and foreign policy, and monetary and currency policy. When a policy area is transferred, the Faroese authorities also assume the associated legislative, executive, and financial responsibilities. Policy areas that have not been transferred continue to fall under the authority of the central institutions of the Kingdom of Denmark.

A further step towards Faroese autonomy was taken with the Foreign Affairs Authorisation Act of 2005, which entered into force following negotiations between the Danish and Faroese governments. The Act authorises the Faroese Government to independently negotiate and conclude international agreements in areas that fall within Faroese competence. It also allows the Faroe Islands to apply for membership of international organisations whose membership is not restricted to sovereign states. At the same time, the Act places clear limits on this authority. Referring to the Takeover Act, it specifies that the Faroese authorities cannot negotiate or conclude agreements affecting the defence or security interests of the Kingdom of Denmark. In such cases, the participation of the Danish Government is required.

The Danish Prime Minister's Office maintains an updated list of special Faroese matters and common matters. One of the policy areas that the Faroe Islands has assumed responsibility over is agriculture, rural affairs, and fisheries. Consequently, legislative, executive, and financial responsibility for fisheries rests entirely with the Faroese authorities.

Taken together, the legal arrangements explain why the Faroe Islands is able to conduct aspects of their external relations independently although they are formally under the Kingdom of Denmark. As an example, because fisheries constitute a special Faroese matter, the Foreign Affairs Authorisation Act provides the legal basis for the Faroese authorities to negotiate and conclude bilateral fisheries agreements directly with foreign states without the formal involvement of Denmark. This has led to contested bilateral cooperation with Russia in the maritime domain which will be further elaborated in the section about Faroese foreign relations to Russia.

== European Union relations ==
As explicitly asserted by both Rome treaties, the Faroe Islands is not part of the European Union. This means that the free movement of goods, people, capital and services and other directives by the EU do not apply between it and the Faroe Islands.

The Faroe Islands is not part of the Schengen Area. However, persons travelling between the Faroe Islands and the Schengen Area are not subject to border controls. This is partly the case due to the abovementioned fact that individuals born in the Faroe Islands hold Danish citizenship and passports identical to Danish citizen born in Denmark.

Although the Faroe Islands is part of the Kingdom of Denmark, the relationship between the Faroe Islands and the EU is very different from the relationship between Denmark and the EU. Part of the reason for this is closely connected to the fisheries domain which account for 90-95 % of Faroese exports and 20 % of Faroese GDP. The Faroe Islands' dependence on the fishing industry is not without challenges, as it makes the economy vulnerable to fluctuations in fish catches and the prices of fish products. As a result, problems such as overfishing and low fish prices can have a negative impact on the development of society.

=== EU boycott against the Faroe Islands ===
In 2010, the Faroe Islands and the EU disagreed over mackerel and herring quotas because the Faroe Islands unilaterally set their own quotas. This happened because the Faroe Islands did not succeed in negotiating quotas after changes in mackerel migration patterns, which meant that this species was more often found in Faroese waters. The quotas allocated by the Faroese authorities were harvested within the Faroe Islands' own maritime zone. In 2010, the Faroese quota was 5%, equivalent to 15,000 tonnes, although the Faroese authorities had sought a 15% share. In 2011, the Faroese Minister of Fisheries, Jacob Vestergaard, set the Faroe Islands' mackerel quota at 150,000 tonnes, including quotas obtained through reciprocal agreements with Iceland and Russia, as well as catches for scientific research purposes.

After a series of negotiations failed to produce an agreement, the EU and Norway imposed sanctions on the Faroe Islands in July 2013. Under these measures, Faroese vessels fishing for mackerel or herring, or transporting these species, were denied access to ports in the EU, including Denmark, as well as in Norway. As a result, Denmark ended up participating in sanctions against a part of its own Kingdom. Rather than yielding to the pressure, the Faroe Islands sought alternative export markets outside the EU. An economic report published in autumn 2014 noted that the proportion of Faroese exports destined for the EU had declined, while exports to countries such as China, Russia, the United States, and Nigeria had increased. The sanctions remained in place for one year until the boycott was lifted on 20 August 2014 after a breakthrough in negotiations where the Faroese share of the total mackerel quota jumped from 4.62% to 12.6%.

In 2014, the EU and Norway imposed sanctions on Russia, which responded by introducing retaliatory sanctions against the EU and Norway. Having itself been subject to EU sanctions until 20 August 2014, the Faroe Islands chose not to participate in the sanctions against Russia. Instead, the Faroese Prime Minister (Løgmaður), Kaj Leo Johannesen, travelled to Moscow to negotiate exports of Faroese salmon to the Russian market. This decision generated considerable debate in European countries. The debate was rooted in the close cooperation between the Faroe Islands and Russia in an era where Russia was seen as an enemy of the EU and other Western countries. A cooperation that continues to exist to the present day.

== Russia relations ==
The Faroe Islands reached a fisheries agreement with the Soviet Union in the 1970s (one of the first western countries to do so during the Cold War), and Russia has remained a major export market in the post-Soviet era. The tensions between the EU and Russia following Russia's annexation of Crimea in 2014 did not affect the trade relationship between the Faroe Islands and Russia negatively. In reverse, because the Faroe Islands did not support the European and Norwegian sanctions against Russia, Faroese fish export to Russia increased substantially compared to before the implementation of European and Norwegian sanctions against Russia. This had a positive impact on the Faroese economy that, as mentioned in the introduction of this article, is highly dependent on export of fish. Furthermore, the Faroe Islands decided to open a diplomatic mission in Moscow in 2015 and signed a memorandum of cooperation with the Eurasian Economic Union in 2018. Taken together, Russia interpreted the Faroese willingness to cooperate as a sign of the good and friendly relationship between the Faroe Islands and Russia.

In 2022, the Faroese Prime Minister Bárður á Steig Nielsen condemned the 2022 Russian invasion of Ukraine. However, The Faroe Islands has continually renewed the yearly bilateral fisheries agreement with Russia to the present day. This might indicate that the Faroe Islands is more friendly minded towards Russia compared to other European countries.

Although this seems to be the case, there was an important development in the Faroese attitude towards Russia in 2025 where the Faroe Islands decided to impose sanctions on the two Russian fishing companies JSC Norebo and Murman Sea Food. These sanctions were implemented by 1 January 2026 with the argument that fishing vessels from the two Russian companies had been under suspicion for conducting espionage in European waters. This indicates a closer alignment between the Faroese and broader European approach towards Russia as the EU and Norway had sanctioned the two Russian companies earlier in 2025.

=== Why is the Faroese Cooperation with Russia Contested in the Western World? ===
As mentioned in the section about the legal framework of the Faroese Foreign relations, the Faroe Islands does not make anything illegal in its bilateral fisheries cooperation with Russia. On the other hand, when considering the general approach of both Denmark, Norway, and other Western states towards Russia, the approach of the Faroe Islands is controversial and arguably violates Western norms and best practices. Therefore, the legal basis of the Faroese approach has regularly been questioned. One can argue that the Faroe Islands' bilateral fisheries cooperation with Russia is placed in between a legal and illegal practice, making it illicit in nature.

The continuation of bilateral fisheries cooperation between the Faroe Islands and Russia has become particularly contested following Russia's full-scale invasion of Ukraine in 2022. The argument against this cooperation is partly rooted in the changing geopolitical significance of maritime presence in the North Atlantic. Although the Faroe Islands has a small land territory, its extensive maritime zone and geographic location give it a strategic importance much greater than the land territorial size per se. To understand this argument, the United Nations Convention on the Law of the Sea (UNCLOS) is important to consider because it defines the rights of states over territories at sea, e.g. the Exclusive Economic Zones (EEZs). This means that a relatively small land territory like the Faroe Islands can exercise authority over substantial maritime territory.

This is particularly significant in an international environment characterised by geopolitical fragmentation. Maritime security has increasingly become connected to geopolitical competition because access to maritime resources, including fisheries, as well as control over maritime routes, are synonomus with political influence. Naturally, it follows that it then also becomes possible sources of interstate conflict. From this perspective, the Faroese–Russian fisheries cooperation is no longer solely a question of fisheries management or economic relations. The continued presence of Russian fishing vessels in Faroese waters and ports also intersects with the broader security relationship between Russia and other states in the Western world.

This perspective is particularly relevant to discussions of grey zone activities. Such activities occupy the ambiguous space between clearly peaceful and clearly hostile behaviour and can blur distinctions between war and peace, military and civilian actors, state and non-state activity, legality and illegality, espionage and research, and deliberate and accidental behaviour. Drawing on the definition of grey zone activities by Bueger and Edmunds (2024), grey zone activities can be conceptualised as moving on a continuum and is never a question about something being black or white. Consequently, the security concern is not only that Russian fishing vessels themselves constitute grey zone actors, but that continued legal access by such Russian civilian vessels may complicate the identification and attribution of activities that potentially serve Russian state interests.

Among other things, this concern has gained relevance because Russia's 2022 naval doctrine allows civilian maritime assets to be used in support of state objectives under certain circumstances. Reports of Russian nationals associated with fishing vessels being suspected of intelligence gathering or preparations for sabotage in European waters have further contributed to concerns about the possible dual use of civilian maritime activity. In this context, ordinary fishing activity and port calls may theoretically provide opportunities for surveillance, intelligence gathering or mapping of critical maritime infrastructure without necessarily constituting unlawful activity. Again referring to UNCLOS, the maritime domain is particularly relevant for Russia to use because limited and fragmented jurisdictions at sea creates room for manouver. For instance, under the flag state principle, the laws aboard a vessel are primarily those of the flag state and boarding a vessel generally requires flag state permission. This means that if the vessel is not doing anything visibly illegal, only docking in ports leaves room for the port state to control what a vessel is doing. In other words, Russian fishing vessels operate under a loose framework when present in Faroese waters.

The bilateral fisheries relationship between the Faroe Islands and Russia is an example of the importance of maritime security in our present world. Fisheries cooperation, which could be viewed solely as resource management and economic diplomacy, now takes place within a fragmented geopolitical environment where the Western world is concerned about Russia's confrontation and Russian grey zone activities, particularly in European waters. The controversy does not arise because Russian fishing in Faroese waters is inherently illegal or hostile, but because legal maritime access can generate security vulnerabilities. The case demonstrates how important it is to consider maritime governance as it can challenge national security severely.

== United Kingdom relations ==
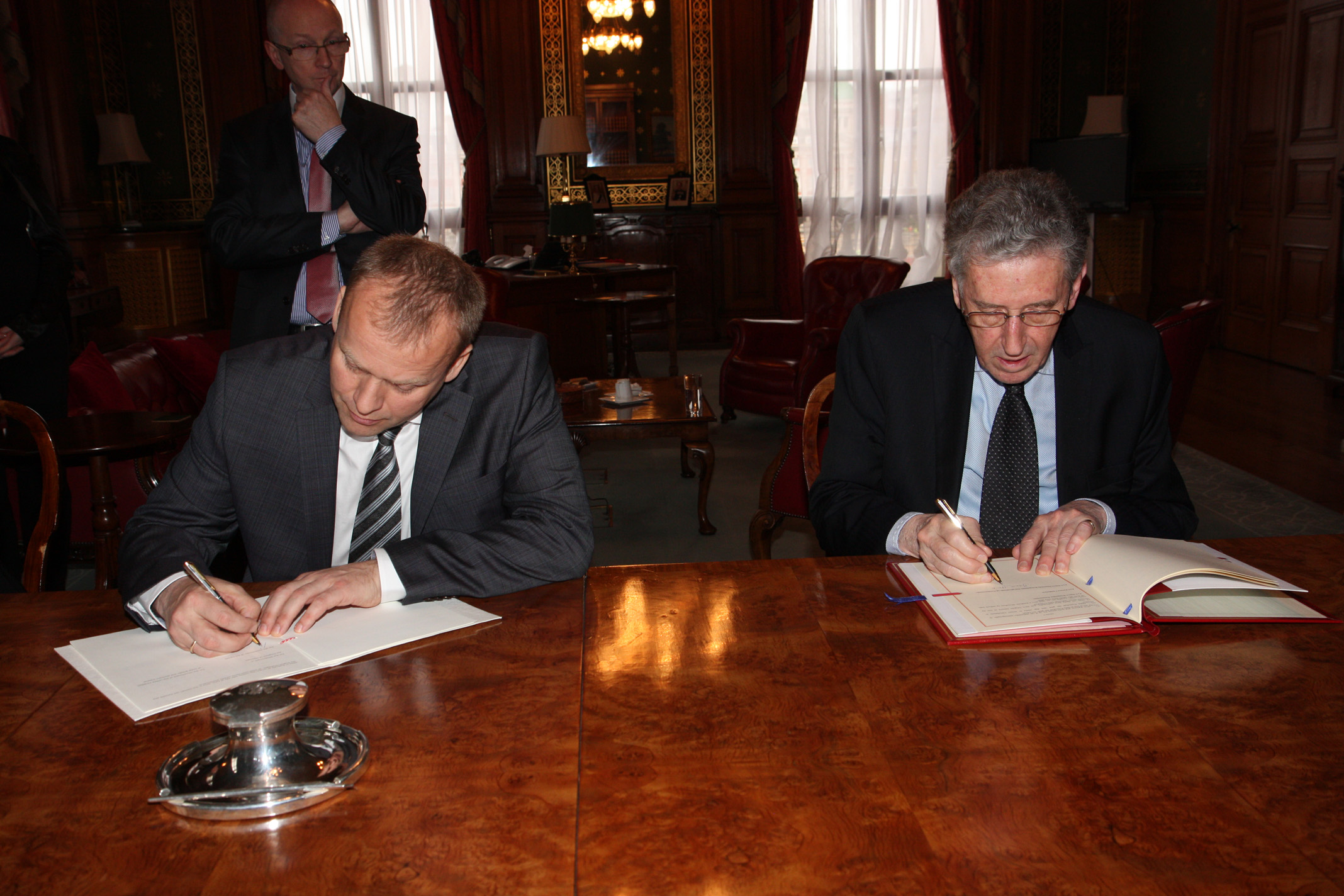
Faroese Prime Minister Kaj Leo Johannesen with British Foreign Office Minister Lord Howell in London, April 2012.

- The Faroe Islands maintains a representation in London.
- The United Kingdom is accredited to the Faroe Islands through its consulate in Tórshavn.

The UK occupied Faroe Islands from 1940 until 1945, when the Faroe Islands were returned to Denmark.

Bilaterally the two countries have a Double Taxation Agreement, and a Free Trade Agreement.

From 1 January 1997 until 30 December 2020, trade between the Faroe Islands and the United Kingdom was governed by the Faroe Islands–European Union Trade Agreement, while the United Kingdom was a member of the European Union.

Following the withdrawal of the United Kingdom from the European Union, the UK and the Faroe Islands signed a Free Trade Agreement on 31 January 2019. The Faroe Islands–United Kingdom Free Trade Agreement is a continuity trade agreement, based on the EU free trade agreement, which entered into force on 1 January 2021. Trade value between the Faroe Islands and the United Kingdom was worth £1,923 million in 2022.

== United States relations ==
The Foreign Minister Jenis av Rana met US Secretary of State Mike Pompeo in Copenhagen on 22 July 2020. On 28 November the Islands signed a partnership declaration with the United States. The US ambassador to Denmark Carla Sands had previously exerted pressure on the Islands not to let Huawei supply its 5G network infrastructure. In October, the Commander of United States Naval Forces Europe-Africa, Robert P. Burke, had also met with the Foreign Minister.

== See also ==
- Faroe Islands–United Kingdom relations
- Faroe Islands and the European Union
- Faroese independence movement
- Politics of the Faroe Islands
