= Raja 420 =

- Poster
- Bengali: রাজা ৪২০
- Directed by: Uttam Akash
- Written by: Uttam Akash
- Produced by: Gudhuli Films
- Starring: Shakib Khan; Apu Biswas; Omar Sani; Ravina Brishti; Sadek Bachchu
- Cinematography: Laal Mohammad
- Edited by: A. Rahim
- Music by: Kazi Jamal and Jibon Murad
- Production company: Gudhuli Films
- Distributed by: Gudhuli Films
- Release date: 5 February 2016
- Running time: 153 minutes
- Country: Bangladesh
- Language: Bengali

Raja 420 is 2016 Bangladeshi comedy film. The film's directed by Uttam Akash and produced by Gudhuli Films. The film features superstar Shakib Khan and Apu Biswas in the lead roles. Also features Omar Sani, Ravina Brishti, Amit Hasan, Sadek Bachchu and Kabila. The film's on February 5, 2016.

== Cast ==
- Shakib Khan as Raja
- Apu Biswas as Rani
- Omar Sani as Badsha
- Ravina Brishti as Nargis
- Amit Hasan as Disco Baba
- Sadek Bachchu as Rani's father
- Rebeka Rouf as Raja's mother
- Kabila
- Komol Patekar
- Kala Aziz
- Jadu Azad

== Production ==
The film Raja 420 began with Muharat at Priyanka Shooting House in Hatirjheel, Dhaka on March 3, 2015. The film was shot on August 17, 2015, at Koraitola, Bangladesh Film Development Corporation (BFDC), with protagonist Shakib Khan, Omar Sani, Kabila and Sadek Bachchu participating. The film's lead actress Apu Biswas joined the filming from the next day on the 18th, on which shots in Pubail and Aftabnagar.

== Soundtrack ==
Raja 420

Soundtrack album by Kazi Jamal and Jibon Murad
- Released: 2016
- Studio: Gudhuli Films
- Genre: Film soundtrack
- Length: 15:22
- Language: Bengali
- Label: Live Tech
- Producer: Kazi Jamil, Jibon Murad

Singles from Raja 420
- 1. "O Praner Taja" Released: 01 February 2016; 2. "Amar Ontoray" Released: 01 February 2016; 3. "Premer Achol" Released: 01 February 2016; 4. "Poisha Fell Tamasha Dekh" Released: 1 February 2016

Kazi Jamal chronology
Dekhao Guru (2007)	Raja 420 (2016)

Jibon Murad chronology
Raja 420 (2016)

The film's soundtrack is composed by Kazi Jamal and Jibon Murad. Its music composed and lyrics penned by Shah Abdul Karim (Collection) Azmul Huda and Jibon Murad. The songs of the film are sung by Andrew Kishore, Mila Islam, Uma Khan, Kishore, Prashant and Nusrat Papri. The film's also used a song titled "O Praner Raja" from the Akbar Kabir Pintu's 1975 film Badshah starring legendary duo Shabana and Khosru, penned by Gazi Mazharul Anwar sung by Probal Chowdhury and Uma Khan and composed by Ali Hossain. The new song is composed by Kazi Jamal and featuring vocals by Andrew Kishore and Uma Khan and was revealed on February 1, 2016, on Live Technologies' YouTube channel.

Track listing
No.	Title	Lyrics	Music	Singer(s)	Length
1.	"O Praner Raja"	Azimul Huda Mithu	Kazi Jamal	Andrew Kishore and Uma Khan	4:00
2.	"Amar Ontoray"	Shah Abdul Karim	Kazi Jamal	Prashanta	4:13
3.	"Premer Achol"	Jibon Murad	Jibon Murad	Kishore and Mila Islam	3:15
4.	"Poisha Fell Tamasha Dekh"	Kazi Jamal	Kazi Jamal	Nusrat Papri and Bappi Raj	3:54
Total length:					15:23

== Marketing and release ==
The official trailer of the film was released on Shakib Khan's official Facebook page on January 21, 2016.

=== release ===
Raja 420 was released in theaters across the country on February 5, 2016.
