= Faroe Islands and the European Union =

European Union-Faroe Islands relations
- European Union: Faroe Islands

The Faroe Islands, a self-governing nation within the Kingdom of Denmark, is not part of the EU, as explicitly asserted by both Rome treaties.

The relations of the Faroe Islands with the EU are governed by the accession treaty of Denmark to the EU, a Fisheries Agreement (1977) and a Free Trade Agreement (1991, revised 1998). The main reason for remaining outside the EU is disagreements about the Common Fisheries Policy.

== EU relations ==
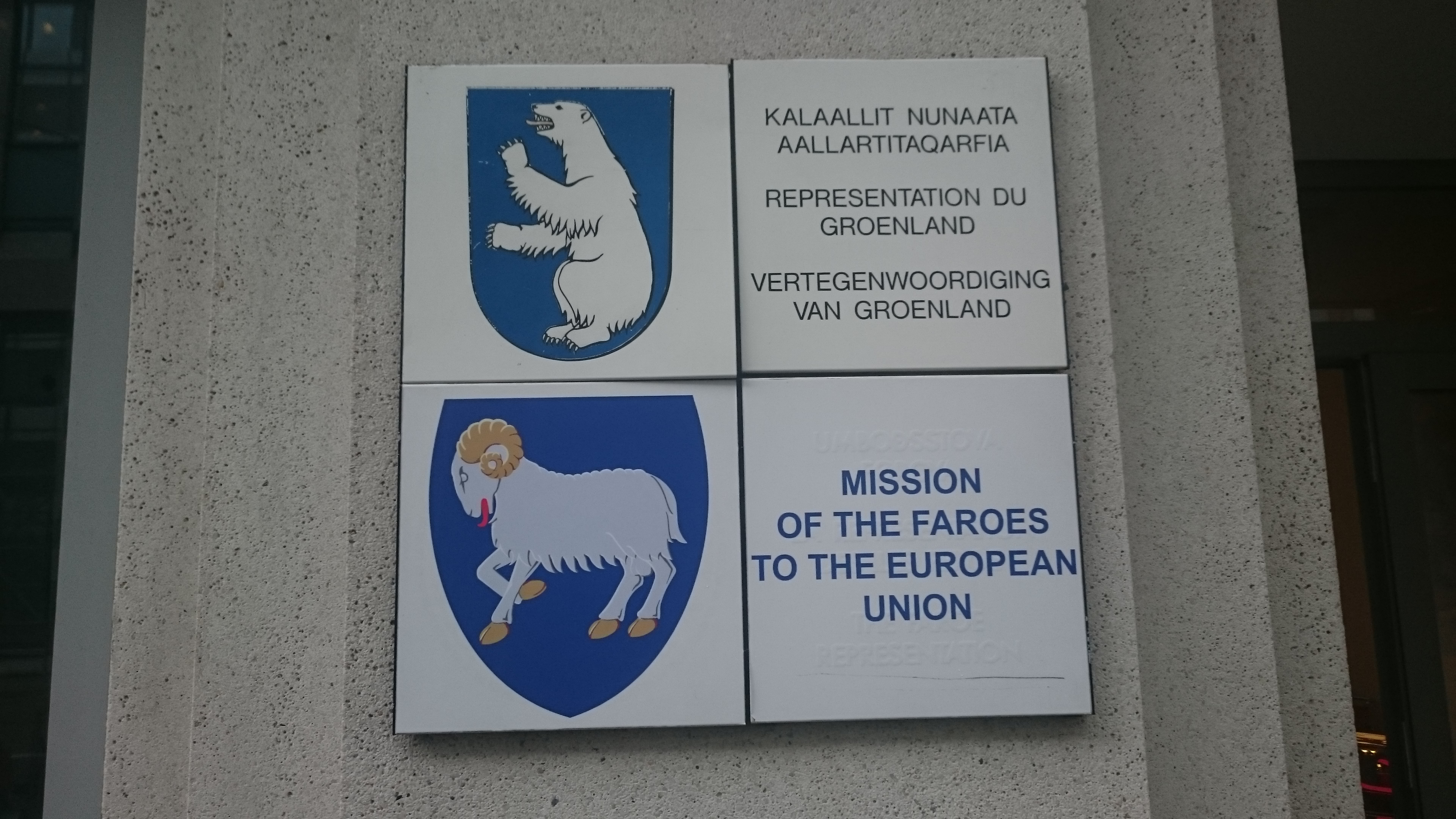
Mission of the Faroes to the European Union

As explicitly asserted by both Rome treaties, the Faroe Islands are not part of the European Union. This means that free movement of goods, people, capital and services within the EU and other directives do not apply to the Faroe Islands.

A protocol to the treaty of accession of Denmark to the European Communities stipulates that Danish nationals residing in the Faroe Islands are not to be considered as Danish nationals within the meaning of the treaties (unless Faroe Islands joins the EU). Hence, Danish people living in the Faroes are not citizens of the European Union (other EU nationals living there remain EU citizens).

The Faroe Islands are not part of the Schengen Area. However, persons travelling between the Faroe Islands and the Schengen Area are not subject to border controls, although there may be identity checks when checking in for flights.

People needing a visa to enter Denmark will need a separate visa for the Faroe Islands, as for people with residence permits. Additionally, citizens of most EU countries require a visa in order to work or live in the Faroe Islands, except for citizens of Finland, Sweden, and Denmark (owing to their membership of the Nordic Council), this privilege is also afforded to citizens of Norway and Iceland.

Charges for international services such as phone roaming and bank transfers are much higher than inside the EU.

The relations between EU and Faroe Islands were strained by the 2013 embargo, and remain tense even following the lifting of the embargo.

== EU boycott against the Faroe Islands ==
In July 2013 the EU imposed sanctions on the Faroe Islands due to a dispute over the fishing quota of herring and mackerel. The boycott, which started on 28 August 2013, banned Faroese vessels carrying herring or mackerel from all EU ports, including Denmark, Sweden and Finland. The Faroe Islands could no longer export herring or mackerel to EU countries. The boycott was lifted on 20 August 2014 after a breakthrough in negotiations which saw the Faroese share of the total mackerel quota jump from 4.62% to 12.6%.

== Euro adoption ==
The Faroe Islands have as their currency the Faroese króna, a special version of the Danish krone that has been printed and minted with text in the Faroese language. It is not a separate currency and can be exchanged 1:1 with the Danish version. Monetary policy is controlled by the Danish Central Bank. If Denmark adopted the euro, a separate referendum would be required in the Faroe Islands to decide whether they should follow suit. They have voted not to be a part of the EU in the past, and their populations would not participate in a Danish euro referendum. On 5 November 2009, the Faroese Parliament approved a proposal to investigate the possibility for euro adoption, including an evaluation of the legal and economic impact of adopting the euro ahead of Denmark.

== EU membership ==
There are politicians, mainly in the centre-right Union Party (Sambandsflokkurin), led by their chairman Kaj Leo Johannesen, who would like to see the Faroes as a member of the EU. However, the chairman of the left-wing Republic (Tjóðveldi), Høgni Hoydal, has expressed concerns that if the Faroes were to join the EU as is, they might vanish inside the EU, comparing this to the situation of Åland today, and wants the local government to solve the political situation between the Faroes and Denmark first.

A major concern is also fishing, which accounts for 90 percent of Faroese exports. As such a large part of their economy, the islands do not want decisions on it being made so far away as they would have so little say in the EU due to their small population. As an EU member, according to the Common Fisheries Policy they would have to give away large fish quotas in their own waters to other EU countries.

== See also ==
- Faroe Islands–United Kingdom relations
- Foreign relations of Denmark
- Foreign relations of the European Union
- Foreign relations of the Faroe Islands
