= List of ambassadors to the Kingdom of Denmark =

This is a list of ambassadors to the Kingdom of Denmark. The Kingdom of Denmark as a sovereign state compromising the three constituent countries: Denmark, Greenland and the Faroe Islands. Note that some ambassadors are responsible for more than one country while others are directly accredited to Copenhagen.

== Current Ambassadors to Copenhagen ==
Sending country	Presentation of the credentials	Location of resident embassy	Ambassador
Afghanistan	31.01.2025	Oslo, Norway	Najibullah Sherkhan (First Secretary)
Albania	12.10.2010	Copenhagen, Denmark	Arben Cici
Algeria	09.09.2008	Copenhagen, Denmark	Abdelhamid Boubazine
Andorra	14.12.2011	Andorra la Vella, Andorra	Maria Noguer Gonzáles (Chargé d'Affaires a.i.)
Angola	09.03.2012	Stockholm, Sweden	Brito Antonio Sozinho
Argentina	19.11.2010	Copenhagen, Denmark	Raúl Alberto Ricardes
Armenia	14.10.2011	Copenhagen, Denmark	Hrachya Aghajanyan
Australia	26.05.2010	Copenhagen, Denmark	James Choi
Austria	05.10.2009	Copenhagen, Denmark	Daniel Krumholz
Azerbaijan	17.04.2009	London, UK	Fakhraddin Isa oglu Gurbanov
Bahrain		London, UK	Yusuf Mohamed Abdulla Jameel (Chargé d'Affaires a.i.)
Bangladesh	08.04.2011	Stockholm, Sweden	Gousalazam Sarker
Barbados		Brussels, Belgium	vacant
Belarus	07.04.2005	Stockholm, Sweden	Andrei Grinkevich
Belgium	05.10.2009	Copenhagen, Denmark	Jean-François Branders
Benin	09.09.2008	Copenhagen, Denmark	Arlette Claudine Kpèdétin Dagnon Vignikin
Bhutan	04.02.2005	Brussels, Belgium	Sonam T. Rabgye
Bolivia	20.09.2007	Copenhagen, Denmark	Eugenio Poma Añaguaya
Bosnia and Herzegovina	27.01.2012	Copenhagen, Denmark	Kemal Muftic
Botswana	18.12.2006	Stockholm, Sweden	Bernadette Sebage Rathedi
Brazil	21.09.2010	Copenhagen, Denmark	Goncalo de Barros Carvalho e Mello Mourão
Brunei		Bandar Seri Begawan, Brunei	Pengiran Dato Yunus Mahmud (Ambassador Agréé)
Bulgaria	16.10.2009	Copenhagen, Denmark	Valentin Delchev Poriazov
Burkina Faso	07.07.2008	Copenhagen, Denmark	Monique Ilboudo
Burundi		Berlin, Germany	Anatole Bacanamwo (Ambassador Agréé); Barthélemy Mfayokurera (Chargé d'Affaires a.i.)
Cambodia	21.03.2006	London, UK	Hor Nambora
Cameroon		London, UK	Ekaney Nkwelle (Ambassador Agréé)
Canada	19.10.2012	Copenhagen, Denmark	André Francois Giroux
Central African Republic		Brussels, Belgium	Armand Guy Zounguere-Sokambi (Ambassador Agréé)
Chad	23.11.2009	Berlin, Germany	Hassan Tchonai Elimi
Chile	20.06.2012	Copenhagen, Denmark	Juan Salazar Sparks
China	11.05.2012	Copenhagen, Denmark	Li Ruiyu
Colombia	19.10.2012	Stockholm, Sweden	Victoriana Mejía Marulanda
Comoros		Paris, France	vacant
Congo		Brazzaville, Republic of the Congo	vacant
Costa Rica		London, UK	Pilar Saborío de Rocafort (Ambassador Agréé)
Côte d'Ivoire	14.10.2011	Copenhagen, Denmark	Mina Baldé-Laurent
Croatia	23.11.2009	Copenhagen, Denmark	Ladislav Pivčević
Cuba	07.11.2011	Copenhagen, Denmark	Caridad Yamira Cueto Milian
Cyprus	20.02.2009	Copenhagen, Denmark	George C. Kasoulides
Czech Republic	07.07.2008	Copenhagen, Denmark	Zdeněk Lyčka
Democratic Republic of Congo		Stockholm, Sweden	Henri Mbayahe Ndungo (Chargé d'Affaires a.i.)
Djibouti	10.12.2002	Brussels, Belgium	Mohamed Moussa Chehem
Dominican Republic		Stockholm, Sweden	Lourdes Victoria-Kruse
Ecuador	09.03.2012	Stockholm, Sweden	Mario Guerrero Murgueytio
Egypt	03.08.2009	Copenhagen, Denmark	Nabil Riad Habashi
El Salvador	13.01.2006	Stockholm, Sweden	Martin Rivera Gómez
Equatorial Guinea		Brussels, Belgium	vacant
Eritrea		Stockholm, Sweden	vacant
Estonia	14.10.2011	Copenhagen, Denmark	Katrin Kivi
Ethiopia	09.03.2012	London, UK	Berhanu Kebede
Fiji	19.10.2012	London, UK	Naivakarurubalavu Solo Mara
Faroe Islands	01.03.2006	Copenhagen, Denmark	Herálvur Joensen (Head of Representation)
Finland	05.10.2009	Copenhagen, Denmark	Ritva Maarit Kristiina Jalava
France	12.10.2010	Copenhagen, Denmark	Véronique Bujon-Barré
Gabon	23.11.2009	London, UK	Omer Piankali
Gambia	17.11.2008	London, UK	Elizabeth Ya Eli Harding
Georgia	07.11.2011	Copenhagen, Denmark	Gigi Gigiadze
Germany	14.10.2011	Copenhagen, Denmark	Michael Zenner
Ghana	23.11.2009	Copenhagen, Denmark	Hajia Fati Habib-Jawulaa
Greece	13.01.2009	Copenhagen, Denmark	Alexandros Couyou
Greenland	01.09.2007	Copenhagen, Denmark	Tove Søvndahl Pedersen (Head of Representation)
Grenada		Brussels, Belgium	vacant
Guatemala	17.04.2009	Oslo, Norway	Juan Leon Alvarado
Guinea		Berlin, Germany	Ibrahima Sory Sow (Ambassador Agréé)
Guinea-Bissau		Brussels, Belgium	vacant
Guyana	23.01.2006	Brussels, Belgium	Patrick Ignatius Gomes
Haiti		Berlin, Germany	vacant
Holy See	16.11.2012	Stockholm, Sweden	Henryk Józef Nowacki
Honduras	25.11.2011	Stockholm, Sweden	Hernán Antonio Bermúdez
Hungary	21.01.2011	Copenhagen, Denmark	Ferenc Szebényi
Iceland	15.02.2010	Copenhagen, Denmark	Sturla Sigurjónsson
India	12.10.2010	Copenhagen, Denmark	Ashok Kumar Attri
Indonesia	09.03.2012	Copenhagen, Denmark	H. Bomer Pasaribu
Iran	16.11.2012	Copenhagen, Denmark	Hamid Bayat
Iraq	26.05.2010	Copenhagen, Denmark	Albert Issa Nothor
Ireland	21.09.2010	Copenhagen, Denmark	Adrian McDaid
Israel	09.09.2008	Copenhagen, Denmark	Arthur Avnon
Italy	05.11.2013	Copenhagen, Denmark	Luigi Ferrari
Jamaica		London, UK	Anthony Smith Rowe Johnson (Ambassador Agréé)
Japan	19.11.2010	Copenhagen, Denmark	Toshio Sano
Jordan		Berlin, Germany	vacant
Kazakhstan	22.01.2022	Berlin, Germany	Sergey Nurtayev
Kenya	22.10.2007	Stockholm, Sweden	Purity Wakiuru Muhindi
Kosovo	04.02.2010	Berlin, Germany	Vilson Mirdita (Ambassador Agréé)
Kuwait	15.02.2010	Stockholm, Sweden	Ali Ibraheem Alnikhailan
Kyrgyzstan		Berlin, Germany	Tolendy Makeyev (Ambassador Agréé); Erines Otorbaev (Chargé d'Affaires, a.i.)
Laos	25.11.2011	Stockholm, Sweden	Southam Sakonhninhom
Latvia	05.10.2009	Copenhagen, Denmark	Gints Jegermanis
Lebanon		Stockholm, Sweden	Christiane Gezrawi (Chargé d'Affaires, a.i.)
Lesotho	09.03.2012	Dublin, Ireland	Paramente Phamotse
Liberia	07.11.2011	Berlin, Germany	Ethel Davis
Libya		Stockholm, Sweden	vacant
Lithuania	07.11.2011	Copenhagen, Denmark	Vytautas Pinkus
Luxembourg	19.10.2012	Copenhagen, Denmark	Gérard Léon Pierre Philipps
Madagascar	27.03.2009	Berlin, Germany	Léa Raholinirina (Chargé d'Affaires, a.i.)
Malawi	27.03.2007	London, UK	Francis Moto
Malaysia	12.10.2012	Stockholm, Sweden	Dato' Badruddin Bin Ab Rahman
Maldives	21.6.2011	London, UK	Farahanaz Faizal
Mali		Berlin, Germany	vacant
Malta	11.01.2010	Copenhagen, Denmark	Deborah Attard Montalto (Chargé d'Affaires, a.i.)
Mauritania		Berlin, Germany	vacant
Mauritius		London, UK	vacant
Mexico	15.12.2004	Copenhagen, Denmark	Martha Elena Federica Bárcena Coqui
Moldova	07.11.2011	Berlin, Germany	Aureliu Ciocoi
Mongolia	15.02.2010	Stockholm, Sweden	Enkhmandakh Baldan
Montenegro	17.11.2008	Podgorica, Montenegro	Nikola Ciko
Morocco	17.12.2008	Copenhagen, Denmark	Raja Ghannam
Mozambique	08.12.2006	Stockholm, Sweden	Pedro Comissário Afonso
Myanmar		London, UK	U Kyaw Myo Ktut (Ambassador Agréé)
Namibia	21.06.2011	Stockholm, Sweden	Daniel Rudolph Smith
Nepal	11.05.2012	Copenhagen, Denmark	Mukti Nath Bhatta
Netherlands	14.10.2011	Copenhagen, Denmark	Eduard Johannes Maria Middeldorp
New Zealand	19.11.2010	The Hague, Netherlands	George Robert Furness Troup
Nicaragua	10.12.2002	Helsinki, Finland	Ricardo José Alvarado Noguera
Niger	16.11.2012	Berlin, Germany	Aminatou Gaoh
Nigeria	25.11.2011	Stockholm, Sweden	Benedict Onochie Amobi
North Korea	16.10.2009	Stockholm, Sweden	Hui Chol Ri
North Macedonia	08.12.2009	Copenhagen, Denmark	Asaf Ademi
Norway	12.10.2012	Copenhagen, Denmark	Ingvard Havnen
Oman	08.04.2011	Berlin, Germany	Zainab Ali Said Al-Qasmiah
Pakistan	18.12.2006	Copenhagen, Denmark	Fauzia Mufti Abbas
Palestine	10.01.2008	Copenhagen, Denmark	Amro Alhourani (Head of Mission)
Panama	08.04.2011	Stockholm, Sweden	Ricardo Quintero
Papua New Guinea	23.11.2009	Brussels, Belgium	Peter Pulkiye Maginde
Paraguay	21.06.2011	Berlin, Germany	Rául Alberto Florentín Antola
Peru		Berlin, Germany	Julio Ernesto Muñoz Deacon (Ambassador Agréé)
Philippines	12.10.2012	Oslo, Norway	Bayani S. Mercado
Poland	21.09.2010	Copenhagen, Denmark	Rafał Wiśniewski
Portugal	20.10.2008	Copenhagen, Denmark	João Pedro da Silveira Carvalho
Qatar	21.01.2011	The Hague, Netherlands	Hamad Ali Jaber Al-Hinzab
Romania	11.05.2012	Copenhagen, Denmark	Viorel Matei Ardeleanu
Russia	20.06.2012	Copenhagen, Denmark	Mikhail Valentinovich Vanin
Rwanda	11.05.2012	Stockholm, Sweden	Venetiana Sebudandi
San Marino	07.11.1995	San Marino, San Marino	Maria Lea Pedini
Sao Tome and Principe		Brussels, Belgium	vacant
Saudi Arabia	25.06.2008	Copenhagen, Denmark	Abdul Rahman Saad A.Al Hadlg
Senegal		Stockholm, Sweden	Henri Antoine Turpin (Ambassador Agréé)
Serbia	17.12.2008	Copenhagen, Denmark	Vida Ognjenović
Seychelles		London, UK	Patrick Pillay (Ambassador Agréé)
Sierra Leone	19.11.2010	London, UK	Edward Mohamed Turay
Singapore	12.10.2012	Singapore, Singapore	A. Selverajah
Slovakia	08.04.2011	Copenhagen, Denmark	Radomír Bohác
Slovenia	13.01.2009	Copenhagen, Denmark	Bogdan Benko
South Africa	21.09.2010	Copenhagen, Denmark	Samkelisiwe Isabel Mhlanga
South Korea	08.04.2011	Copenhagen, Denmark	Byung-Ho Kim
Spain	21.01.2011	Copenhagen, Denmark	Diego Muñiz Lovelace
Sri Lanka	11.05.2012	Stockholm, Sweden	Oshadhi Jagath Kumara Alahapperuma
Sudan		Oslo, Norway	vacant
Swaziland		London, UK	Henry V. Zeeman (Chargé d'Affaires a.i.)
Sweden	12.10.2010	Copenhagen, Denmark	Inga Eriksson Fogh
Switzerland	12.10.2012	Copenhagen, Denmark	Denis Feldmeyer
Syria		Copenhagen, Denmark	Hanadi Kabour (Chargé d'Affaires a.i.)
Tanzania	21.06.2011	Stockholm, Sweden	Muhammed Mwinyi Mzale
Thailand	16.11.2012	Copenhagen, Denmark	Vimon Kidchob
Togo	23.01.2006	Berlin, Germany	Essohanam Comla Paka
Tonga	17.11.2008	London, UK	Sione Ngongo Kioa
Trinidad and Tobago	25.11.2011	London, UK	Garvin Edward Timothy Nicholas
Tunisia		The Hague, Netherlands	Mohamed Karim Ben Becher (Ambassador Agréé)
Turkey	08.12.2009	Copenhagen, Denmark	Berki Dibek
Uganda	21.03.2006	Copenhagen, Denmark	Joseph Tomusange
Ukraine	12.10.2010	Copenhagen, Denmark	Mykhajlo Vasiljovych Skuratovskyi
United Arab Emirates	19.11.2010	Stockholm, Sweden	Sheikha Najla Mohamed Salem Mohamed Al Qassimi
United Kingdom	19.10.2012	Copenhagen, Denmark	Vivien Frances Life
United States	15.12.2017	Copenhagen, Denmark	Carla Sands
Uruguay		Stockholm, Sweden	vacant
Venezuela		Copenhagen, Denmark	Roger Corbacho (Chargé d'affaires a.i.)
Vietnam	06.07.2012	Copenhagen, Denmark	Lai Ngoc Doan
Yemen		Berlin, Germany	vacant
Zambia	21.06.2011	Stockholm, Sweden	Anne Luzongo Mtamboh
Zimbabwe		Stockholm, Sweden	vacant

== See also ==
- Foreign relations of Denmark
- Foreign relations of the Faroe Islands
- Foreign relations of Greenland
- List of diplomatic missions of the Kingdom of Denmark
- List of diplomatic missions in the Kingdom of Denmark
