= List of diplomatic missions in Denmark =

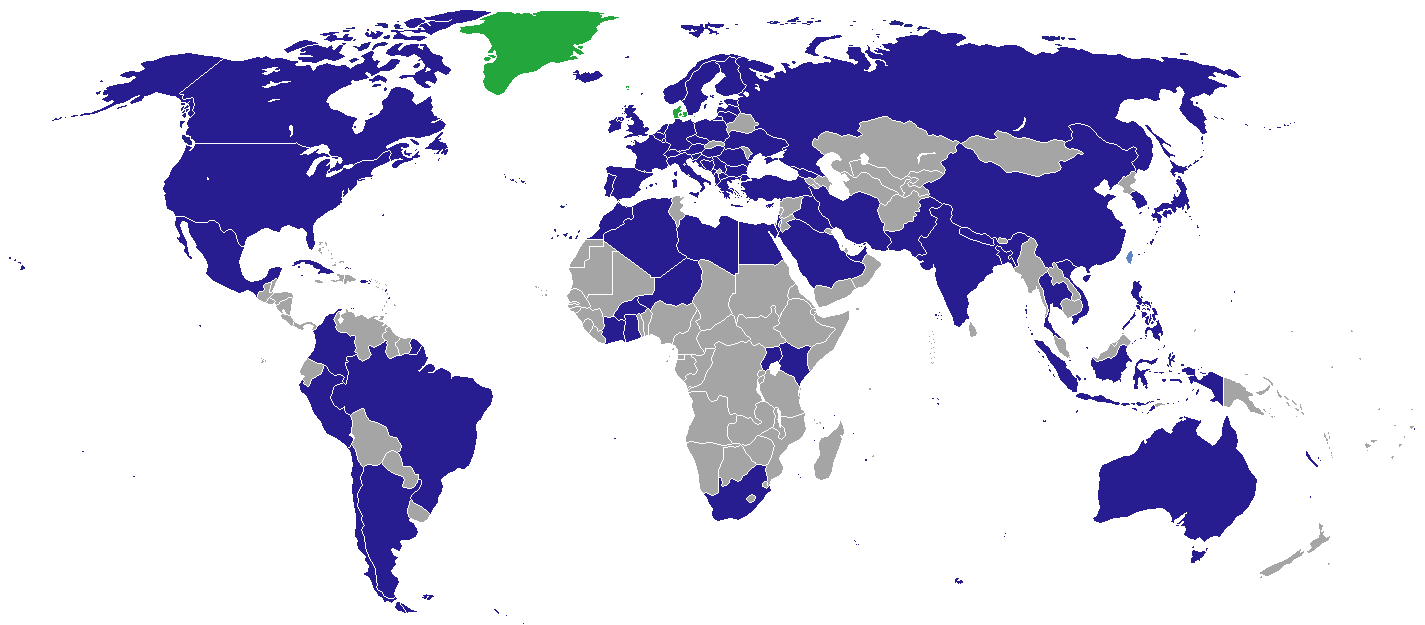
Map of diplomatic missions in the Kingdom of Denmark

This article lists diplomatic missions resident in the Kingdom of Denmark. The Kingdom of Denmark as a sovereign state consists of three countries incorporated in to the unity of the Realm (Denmark (proper), Greenland, Faroe Islands).

At present, the capital city of Copenhagen hosts 74 embassies. Several other countries have ambassadors accredited to the Kingdom, with most being resident in Berlin, London or Stockholm. This listing excludes honorary consulates.

== Embassies in Copenhagen ==
| Country | Mission type | Photo |
|---|---|---|
| Albania | Embassy | |
| Algeria | Embassy | |
| Argentina | Embassy | |
| Australia | Embassy | |
| Austria | Embassy | |
| Bangladesh | Embassy | |
| Belgium | Embassy | |
| Bosnia and Herzegovina | Embassy | |
| Brazil | Embassy | |
| Bulgaria | Embassy | |
| Burkina Faso | Embassy | |
| Canada | Embassy | |
| Chile | Embassy | |
| China | Embassy | |
| Colombia | Embassy | |
| Croatia | Embassy | |
| Cuba | Embassy | |
| Cyprus | Embassy | |
| Czech Republic | Embassy | |
| Egypt | Embassy | |
| Estonia | Embassy | |
| Finland | Embassy | |
| France | Embassy | |
| Georgia | Embassy | |
| Germany | Embassy | |
| Ghana | Embassy | |
| Greece | Embassy | |
| Hungary | Embassy | |
| Iceland | Embassy | |
| India | Embassy | |
| Indonesia | Embassy | |
| Iran | Embassy | |
| Iraq | Embassy | |
| Ireland | Embassy | |
| Israel | Embassy | |
| Italy | Embassy | |
| Ivory Coast | Embassy | |
| Japan | Embassy | |
| Latvia | Embassy | |
| Libya | Embassy | |
| Lithuania | Embassy | |
| Luxembourg | Embassy | |
| Mexico | Embassy | |
| Montenegro | Embassy | |
| Morocco | Embassy | |
| Nepal | Embassy | |
| Netherlands | Embassy | |
| Niger | Embassy | |
| North Macedonia | Embassy | |
| Norway | Embassy | |
| Pakistan | Embassy | |
| Peru | Embassy | |
| Philippines | Embassy | |
| Poland | Embassy | |
| Portugal | Embassy | |
| Romania | Embassy | |
| Russia | Embassy | |
| Saudi Arabia | Embassy | |
| Serbia | Embassy | |
| Slovenia | Embassy | |
| South Africa | Embassy | |
| Republic of Korea | Embassy | |
| Spain | Embassy | |
| Sweden | Embassy | |
| Switzerland | Embassy | |
| Thailand | Embassy | |
| Turkey | Embassy | |
| Uganda | Embassy | |
| Ukraine | Embassy | |
| United Arab Emirates | Embassy | |
| United Kingdom | Embassy | |
| United States | Embassy | |
| Vietnam | Embassy | |

== Representatives Offices in Copenhagen ==
| Country | Mission type | Photo |
|---|---|---|
| Faroe Islands | Representation of the Faroes | - |
| Greenland | Representative Office | |
| Palestine | Mission | |
| Republic of China (Taiwan) | Taipei Representative Office | |

== Consulates in the Kingdom of Denmark ==
| Country | Mission type | City | Photo |
|---|---|---|---|
| Canada | Consulate | Nuuk, Greenland | - |
| France | Consulate-General | Nuuk, Greenland | - |
| Iceland | Consulate-General | Tórshavn, Faroe Islands | - |
| Iceland | Consulate-General | Nuuk, Greenland | - |
| Kosovo | Consulate | Copenhagen | - |
| United States | Consulate | Nuuk, Greenland | |

== High Commissions ==
=== Tórshavn, Faroe Islands ===
- Kingdom of Denmark (High Commission)

=== Nuuk, Greenland ===
- Kingdom of Denmark (High Commission)

== Non-resident embassies accredited to Denmark ==
=== Resident in Berlin, Germany ===
1. Chad
2. Guinea
3. Kosovo
4. Kyrgyzstan
5. Liberia
6. Madagascar
7. Maldives
8. Mali
9. Oman
10. Paraguay
11. Togo
12. Turkmenistan
13. Yemen

=== Resident in Brussels, Belgium ===
1. Bahrain
2. Barbados
3. Bhutan
4. Central African Republic
5. Djibouti
6. Equatorial Guinea
7. Grenada
8. Guinea-Bissau
9. Guyana
10. Honduras
11. Mauritania
12. Papua New Guinea
13. San Marino
14. São Tomé and Príncipe

=== Resident in The Hague, Netherlands ===
1. Moldova
2. Qatar
3. Senegal

=== Resident in London, United Kingdom ===
1. Belize
2. Cambodia
3. Cameroon
4. Eswatini
5. Fiji
6. Gabon
7. Gambia
8. Jamaica
9. Malawi
10. Mauritius
11. Myanmar
12. Saint Vincent and the Grenadines
13. Seychelles
14. Sierra Leone
15. Tonga
16. Trinidad and Tobago

=== Resident in Oslo, Norway ===
1. Afghanistan
2. Jordan
3. South Sudan
4. Sudan
5. Venezuela

=== Resident in Paris, France ===
1. Benin
2. Comoros
3. Congo-Brazzaville

=== Resident in Stockholm, Sweden ===
1. Angola
2. Armenia
3. Belarus
4. Bolivia
5. Botswana
6. Congo-Kinshasa
7. Dominican Republic
8. Ecuador
9. El Salvador
10. Eritrea
11. Ethiopia
12. Guatemala
13. Holy See
14. Kazakhstan
15. Kuwait
16. Laos
17. Lebanon
18. Malaysia
19. Mongolia
20. Mozambique
21. Namibia
22. New Zealand
23. Nigeria
24. North Korea
25. Panama
26. Rwanda
27. Slovakia
28. Sri Lanka
29. Syria
30. Tanzania
31. Tunisia
32. Uruguay
33. Zambia
34. Zimbabwe

=== Resident in other cities ===
1. Andorra (Andorra la Vella)
2. Brunei (Bandar Seri Begawan)
3. Costa Rica (San José)
4. Lesotho (Dublin)
5. Singapore (Singapore)

== Former embassies ==
- Armenia
- Benin
- North Korea
- Slovakia
- Venezuela

== See also ==
- Foreign relations of Denmark
- List of diplomatic missions of Denmark
- Visa requirements for Danish citizens
- List of diplomatic missions in Greenland
