= Helal Khan =

Bangladeshi film actor and producer

- হেলাল খান
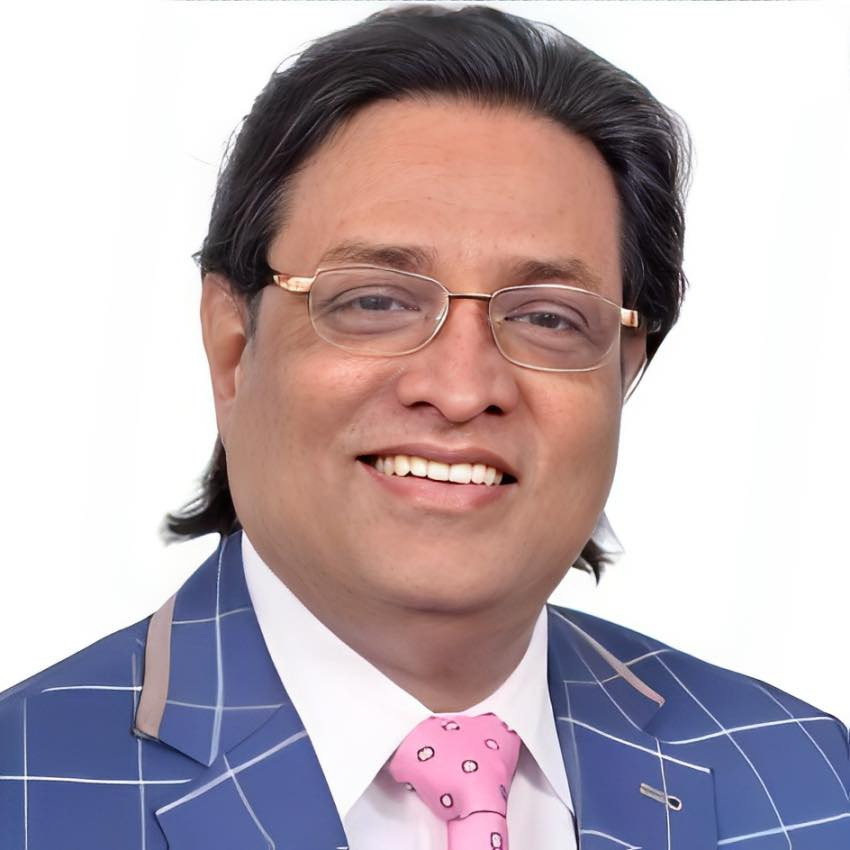
- Khan in 2025
- Occupations: Actor, film director and producer
- Years active: 1994-present
- Notable work: Hason Raja
- Spouses: Uma Khan
- Awards: Full list

Helal Khan is a Bangladeshi film actor, producer and politician. He has acted over 50 films.

Khan won two National Film Awards for the Best Film as the producer of Hason Raja (2002) and Best Actor in a Negative Role for Juari (2002).

== Career ==
Helal Khan debuted his acting in the film Priyo Tumi (1995).

Khan served as the general secretary of Jatiyatabadi Samajik Sangskritik Sangathan (JASAS), an arm of Bangladesh Nationalist Party (BNP). He bought the nomination form from BNP to contest the 2018 Bangladeshi general election for the Sylhet-6 constituency but failed to get the nomination.

== Personal life ==
Helal Khan Born in 12 May, 1956, He married to FATIMA SHOPNA on 02 January 2009 . They have Three sons, Foisol Helal Khan, Saibal Khan Helal and Talha Khan Helal

== Controversy ==
Khan was arrested in two sabotage cases on 16 February 2015 and served a three-month term in prison.

== Filmography ==
- Priyo Tumi
- Bazigor
- Sagarika (1998)
- Asha Amar Asha (1999)
- Kukkhato Khuni (2000)
- Killer (2000)
- Bhoyongkor Sontrasi (2001)
- Hason Raja
- Juari (2003)
- Ora Shahoshi (2003)
- Momtaz (2005)
- Bideshini (2005)
- Dhrubotara (2006)
- Guru Bhai (2009)
- Nakful
- Mukti
- Rokte Amar Agun
- Bishal Hangama
- Drubo Tara
- Aposhhin

== Teleflim ==
- Shundori Bewla (2006)
- Late Marriage
- Megher Onek Rong
- Aguntuk
- Jhorer pakhi

== Awards and achievements ==
Year	Award	Category	Film	Result
2002	National Film Awards	Best Producer	Hason Raja	Won
2002	National Film Awards	Best Actor	Juari	Won
2003	Bangladesh Film Producers Distributors Association (BFPDA)	Best Actor	Hason Raja	Won
