= Shimul Garden =

Garden in Bangladesh

- শিমুল বাগান
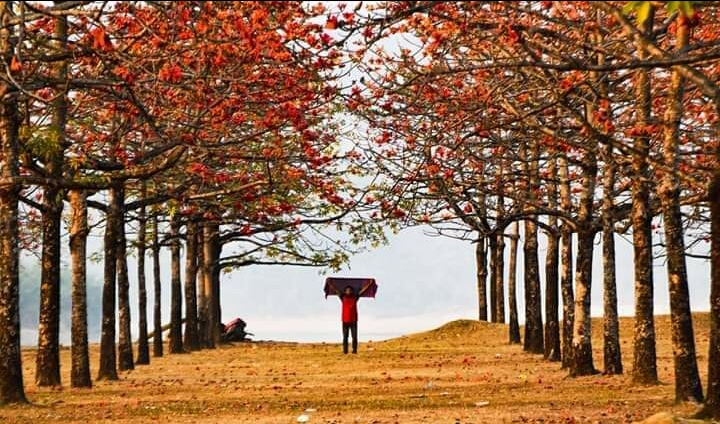
- Shimul Garden in full bloom during spring
- Interactive map of Shimul Garden
- Type: Botanical garden
- Location: Manigaon Village, Tahirpur Upazila, Sunamganj District, Bangladesh
- Coordinates: 25.1000°N 91.0833°E
- Area: 100 acres (40 ha)
- Created: 2002
- Founder: Joynal Abedin
- Operator: Family of Joynal Abedin
- Status: Open during blooming season

Shimul Garden (Bengali: শিমুল বাগান) is location in Bangladesh where Shimul trees (Bombax ceiba) bloom with red flowers during the spring season.

The garden is primarily composed of Shimul trees, which produce vibrant red blossoms in the Bengali months of Falgun and Chaitra. This seasonal transformation attracts visitors who come to see the colorful landscape.

These gardens are located in various places in Bangladesh. Among them, Shimul Bagan in Tahirpur, Sunamganj is known as a tourist center.

== History ==
In 2002, Sunamganj's Tahirpur Upazila's Manigaon Village, near the Jadukata River, ‍a People's representative Joynal Abedin, planted around 3,000 Shimul trees on his 2,400-decimal land purely out of passion.

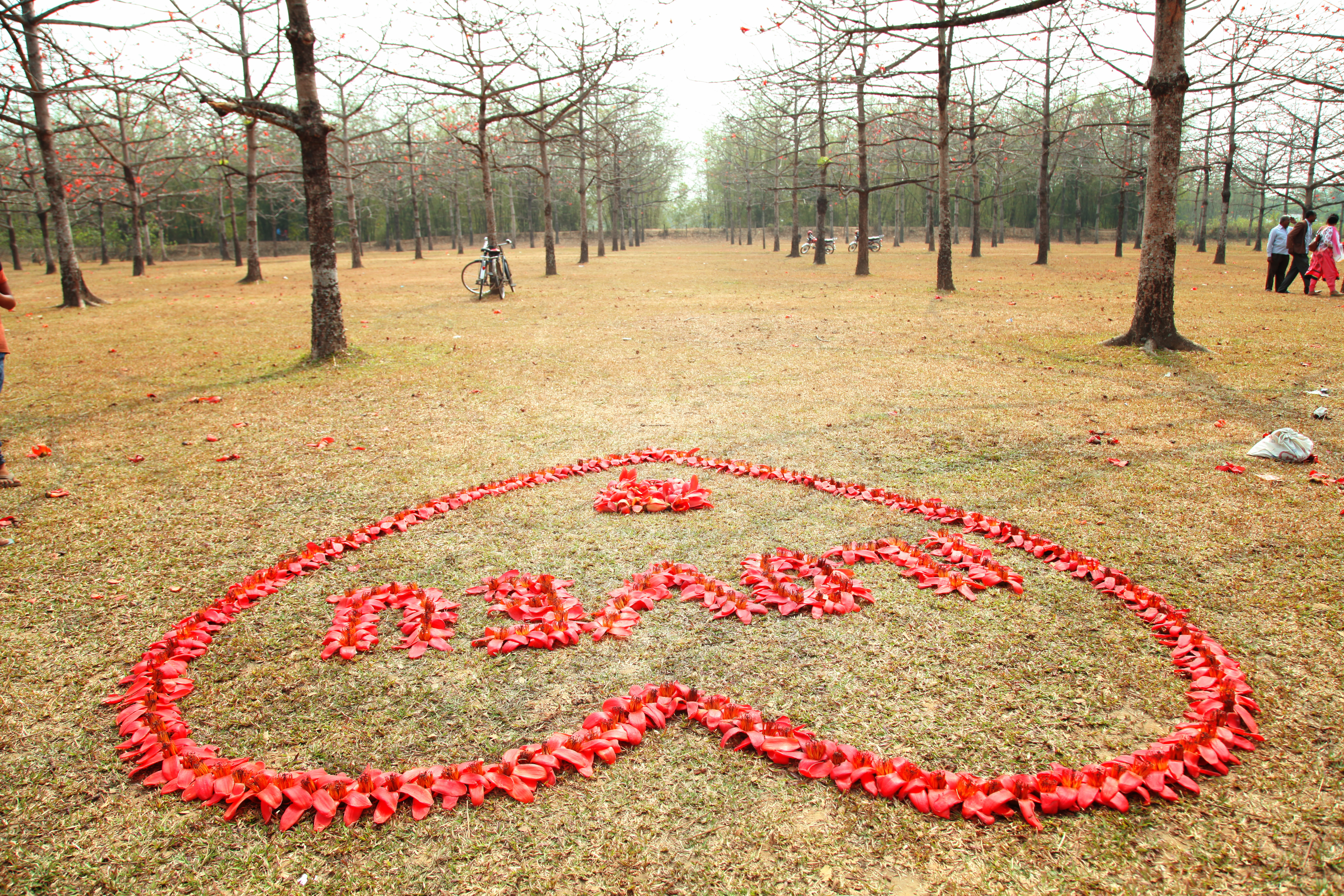
Shimul Garden with Love sign

During spring, nearly 2,000 Shimul trees bloom with red flowers, creating a striking contrast against Tanguar Haor, the Meghalaya foothills, and the Jadukata River. Tourists visit to witness the colorful landscape of seasonal flowers.

=== Location ===
The Shimul Garden is located in Manigaon Village, near the Jadukata River in Sunamganj's Tahirpur Upazila. On the opposite side of the river lies the Indian Meghalaya Hills, while the Jadukata River flows in between, creating a picturesque contrast with the crimson Shimul flowers and the symphony of chirping birds.

== Gallery ==
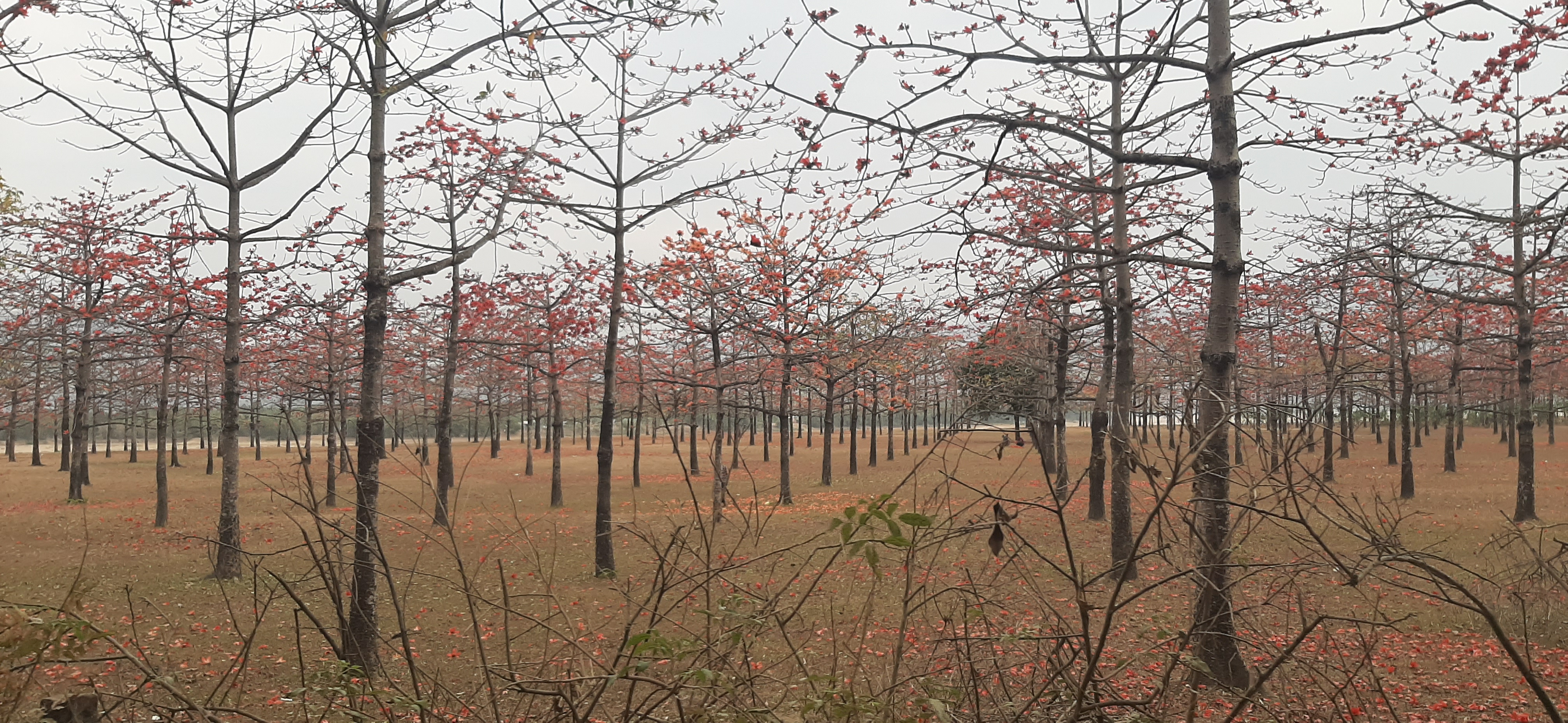
Inside view of Shimul Garden in spring season

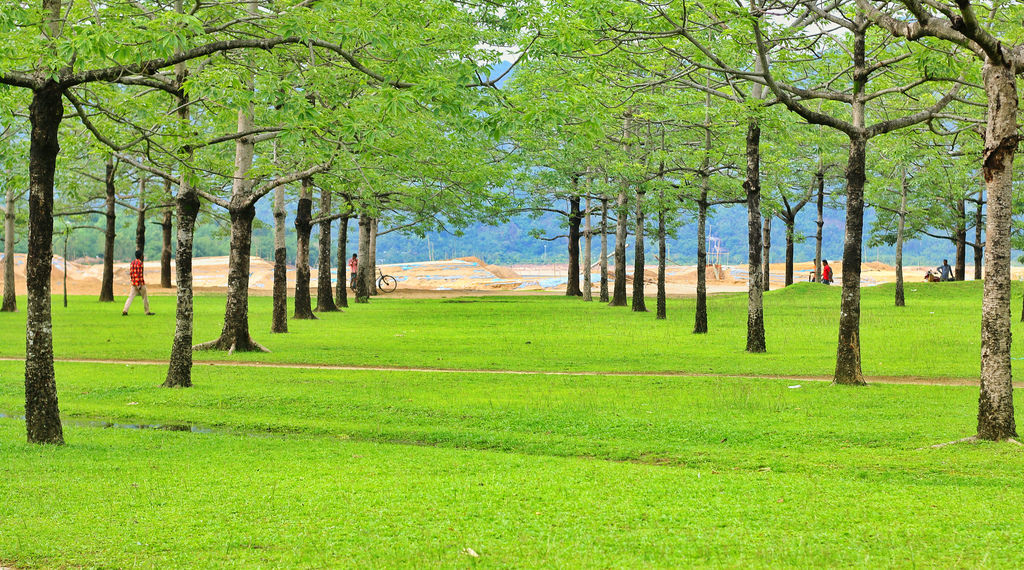
Inside view of Shimul Garden with Green grass

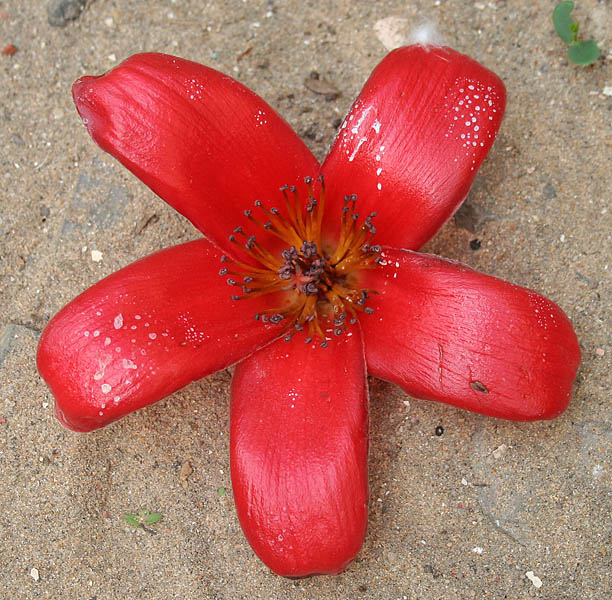
Single (fallen) flower

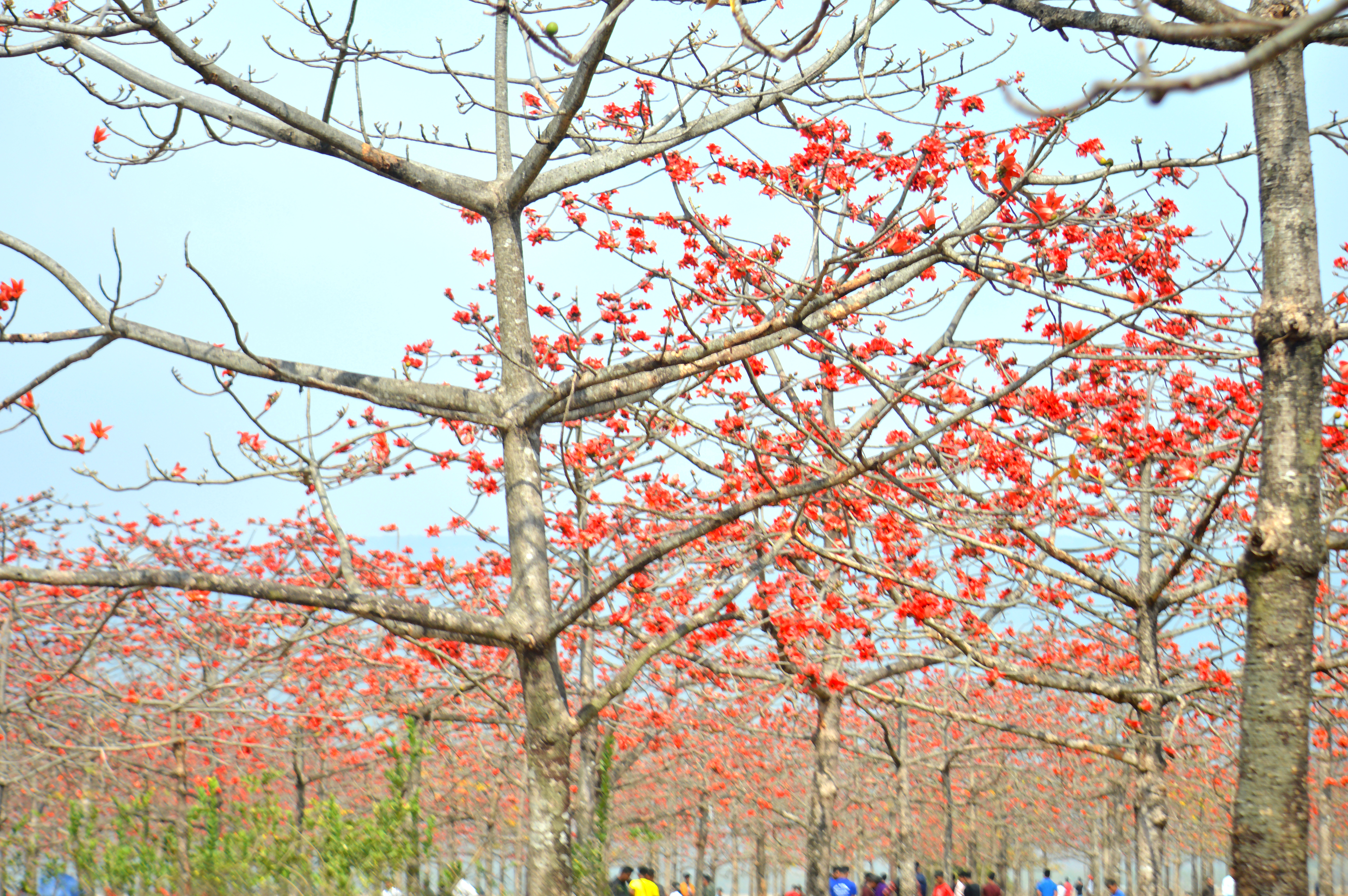
Inside view of Shimul Garden Tree

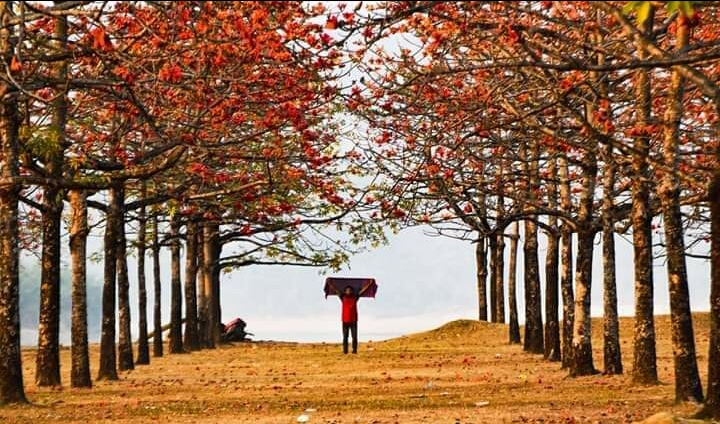
Inside view of Shimul Garden

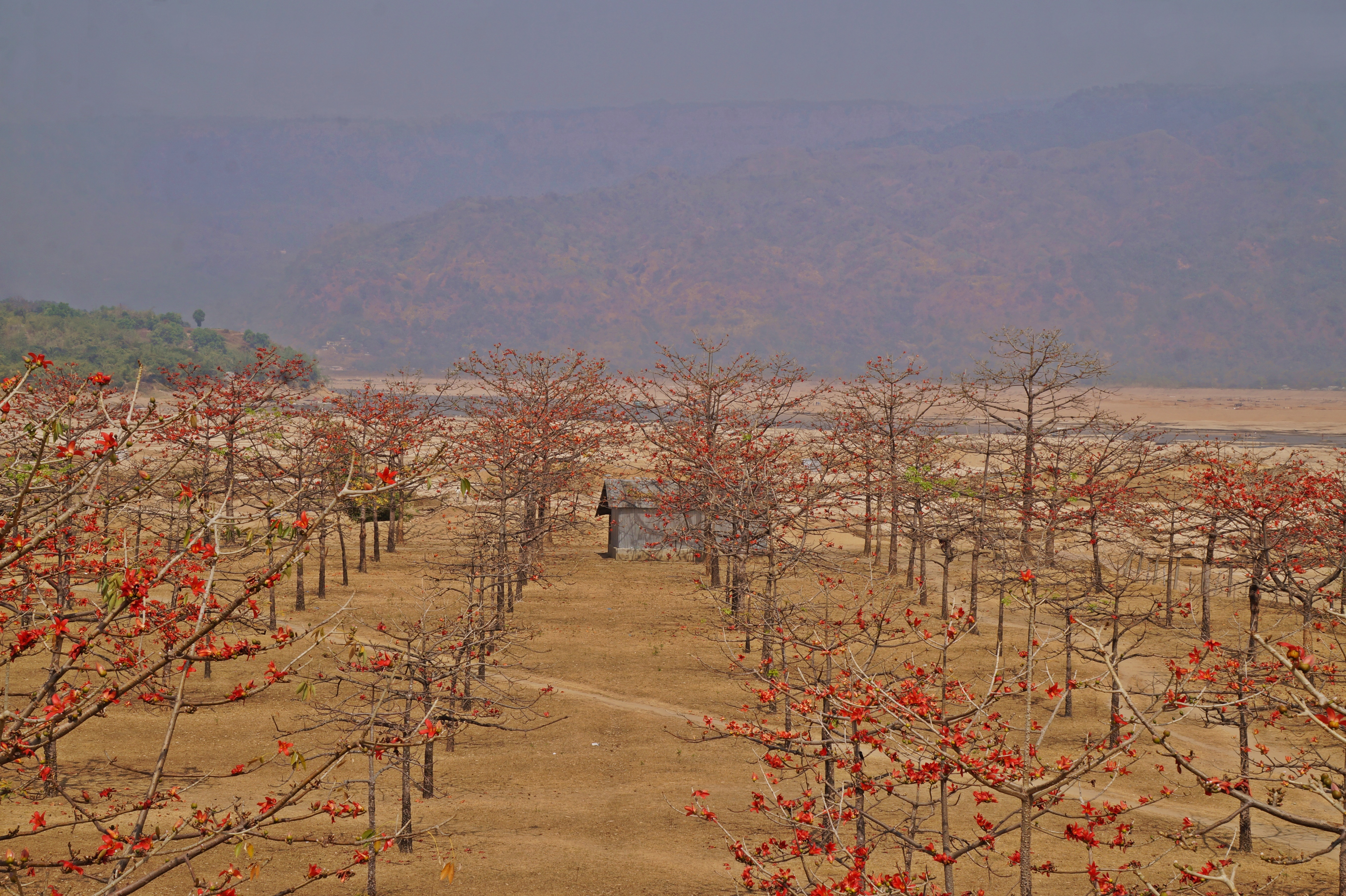
Natural scenario of Shimul Bagan

== See also ==
- Tanguar Haor
- Hason Raja's House
