= Mukta =

Mukta or Muktha may refer to:

- Moksha, spiritual liberation, the soteriological goal of Hinduism

== Entertainment ==
- Mukta (1994 film), an Indian Marathi-language film directed by Jabbar Patel
- Mukta (TV series), an Indian Kannada-language TV series
- Mukta Arts, Indian film company founded by Subhash Ghai
  - Mukta A2 Cinemas, Indian cinema chain

== People ==
- T. Muktha also spelt Mukta (1914–2007), Indian singer
- Muktha (actress) (born 1991), Indian actress also known as Bhanu in the Tamil film industry
- Mukta Barve, Indian actress
- Mukta Dutta Tomar (born 1961), Indian diplomat
- Mukta Farooq, Indian metallurgical engineer
- Mukta Raja, Indian politician
- Muktha Ramaswamy, Indian film producer in the Tamil film industry
- Muktha Srinivasan, Indian film director and producer
- Muktha S. Sundar, Indian film director and cinematographer in the Tamil film industry
- Mukta Tilak, Indian politician

== Other ==
- Mukta, village in Panki block, Jharkhand, India

== See also ==
- Mukti (disambiguation)
- Moksha (disambiguation)
- Jivanmukta (from Sanskrit moksa, freedom) and paramukta, concepts in Hinduism
