= Uma Khan =

Bangladeshi singer

- উমা খান
- Occupation: Singer
- Years active: 1971–present
- Spouse: Helal Khan
- Relatives: Kalyani Ghosh (sister); Probal Chowdhury (brother)

Uma Khan is a Bangladeshi female playback singer. She won Bangladesh National Film Award for Best Female Playback Singer for the film Hason Raja (2002).

== Family ==
Uma Khan was among five daughters and five sons of Manmohan and Lilabati Chowdhury. Probal Chowdhury and Kalyani Ghosh were among her siblings.

Uma married actor and producer Helal Khan on 26 February 1986. Together they have two sons - Faisal Khan Helal and Saibal Khan Helal.

== Career ==
=== Discography ===
- Choto Choto Kotha

== Notable songs ==
- Gunda Number One (2000)
- Hason Raja (2002)
- Juari (2002)
- Hajar Bosor Dhore (2005)
- Raja 420 (2016)
