= List of diplomatic missions in Greenland =

This page lists diplomatic missions resident in Greenland, an autonomous territory within the Kingdom of Denmark. At present, Greenland hosts a Danish High Commission, five fully staffed consulates, Nine honorary consuls and a representative office, all located in the capital Nuuk.

Entity	Type	Location	Opening date	Image
Denmark	High Commission	Nuuk		
Iceland	Consulate general	Tasiilaq	2013	
France	Consulate general	Nuuk	2026	
Norway	Consulate general	Nuuk	2026	
Canada	Consulate	Nuuk	2026	
United States	Consulate	Nuuk	2020 (previously operational during 1940–1953)	
Belgium	Honorary consul	Nuuk		
Czech Republic	Honorary consul	Nuuk		
Spain	Honorary consul	Nuuk		
Finland	Honorary consul	Nuuk		
Germany	Honorary consul	Nuuk		
Luxembourg	Honorary consul	Nuuk		
Netherlands	Honorary consul	Nuuk		
Sweden	Honorary consul	Nuuk	1976	
United Kingdom	Honorary consul	Nuuk		
European Union	Representative Office	Nuuk	opened in 2024	

== See also ==
- Foreign relations of Greenland
- List of diplomatic missions in Denmark
- Greenland Representation to the European Union
