= Jadukata River =

River in Bangladesh and India

Coordinates: 25°10′N 91°15′E

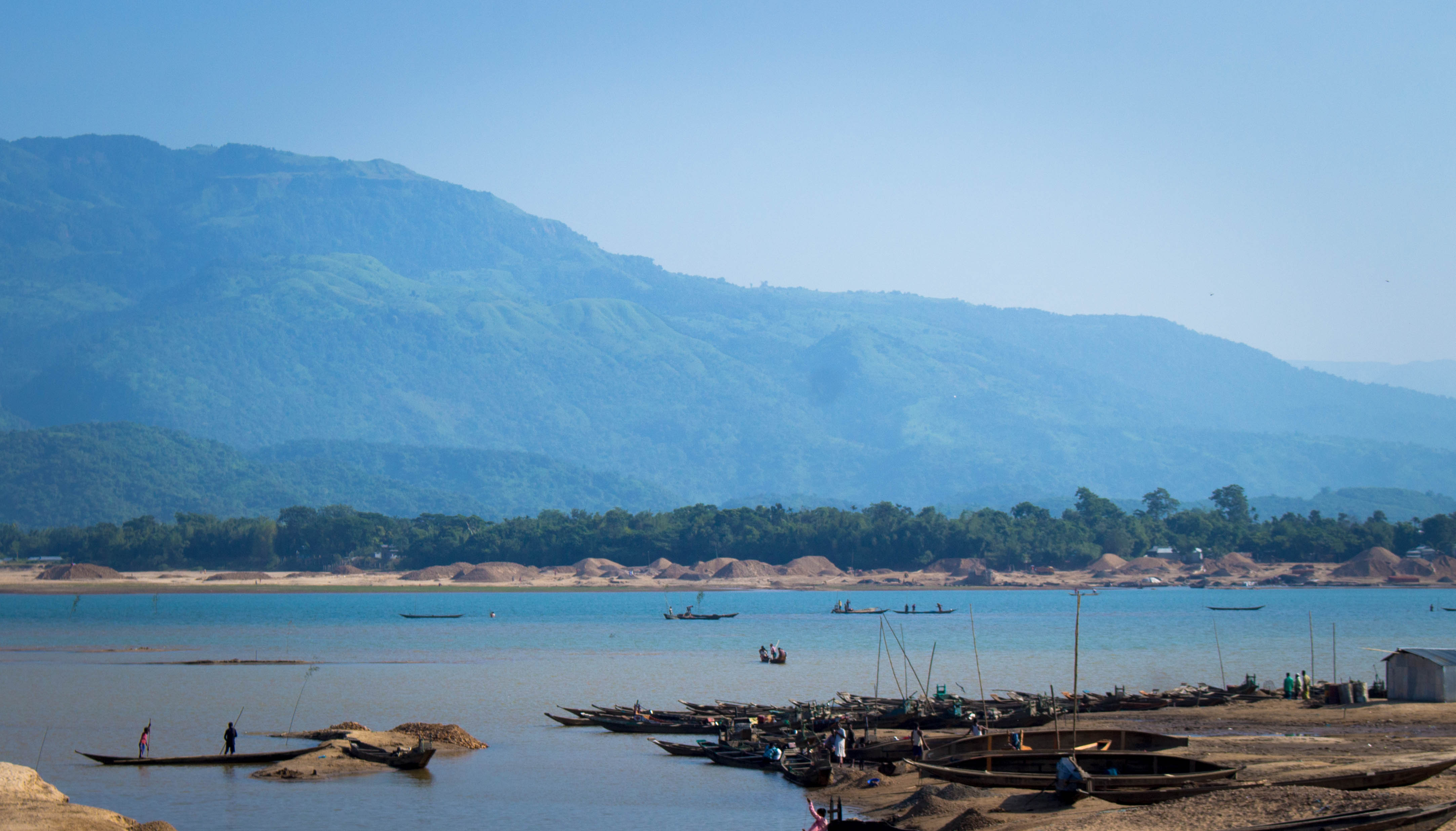
- Jadukata River

Location
- Countries: Bangladesh, India
- State: Meghalaya
- Region: Sylhet Division
- District: Sunamganj

Physical characteristics
- Length: 37 kilometres (23 mi)

Jadukata River is a Transboundary river that flows between Bangladesh and India. This river runs through Sunamganj, located in the northeastern region of Bangladesh.

It is approximately 37 kilometres (23 mi) long, with an average width of about 57 metres (187 ft). The river flows in a winding, snake-like pattern. According to the Bangladesh Water Development Board (BWDB), the official identification number for Jadukata River in the northeastern river category is 72.

== Flow ==
The river reaches a depth of about 8 metres (26 ft) and has a watershed area of roughly 125 square kilometres (48 mi^{2}). It carries water throughout the year. However, during minor floods, the riverbanks tend to overflow. Jadukata plays a significant role in Bangladesh’s mining industry.

== Origin and flow ==
The river originates in India’s Jaintia Hills (part of the Khasi range), and enters Bangladesh through the Bishwambarpur area in Sunamganj District. From there, it flows into Tahirpur, winding slightly southeast, then curves back into Bishwambarpur.

Flowing southward, the river finally merges with the Surma River near the town of Jamalganj. Two river ports—Anwarpur and Durlovpur—are located along its banks.

== Gallery ==
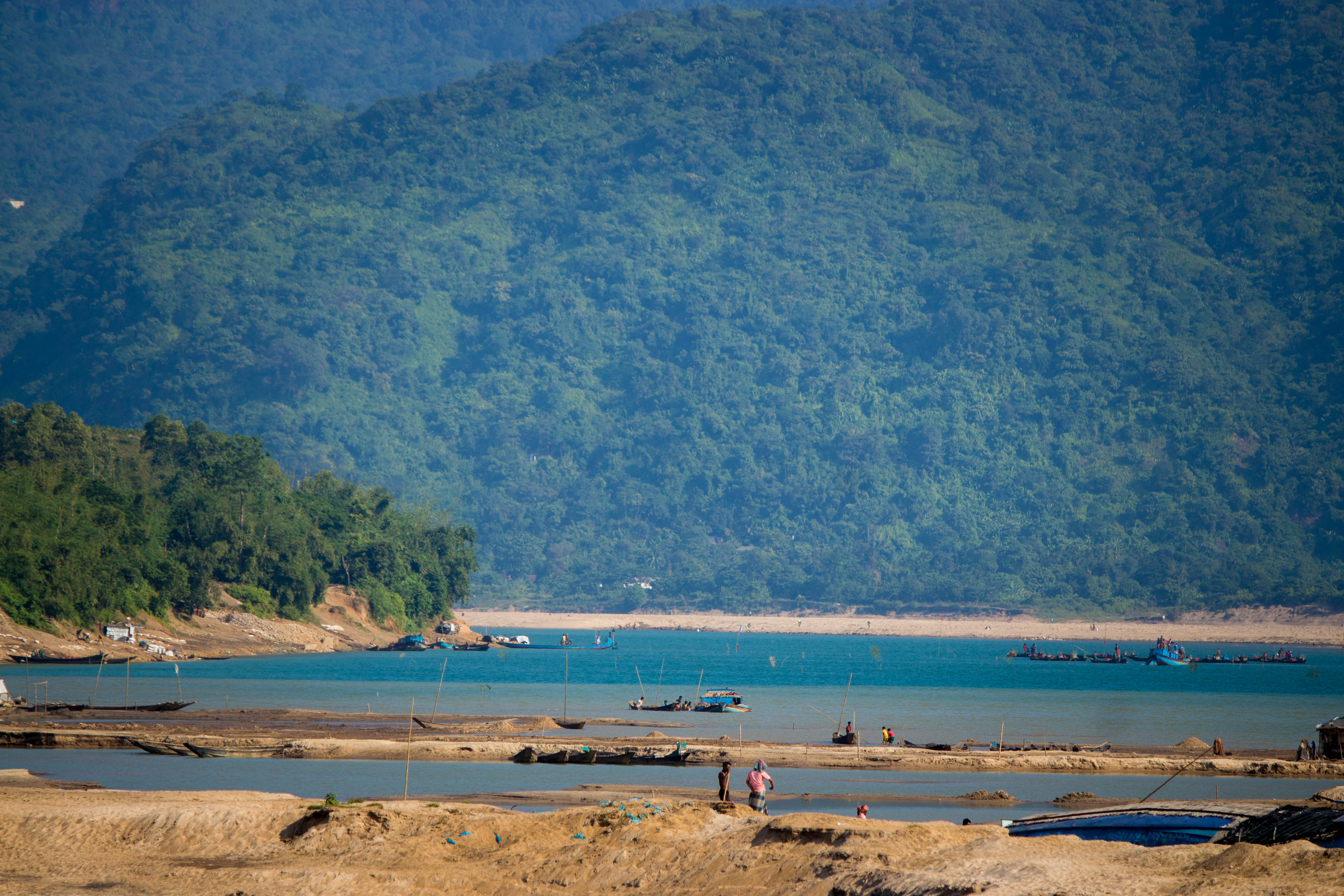

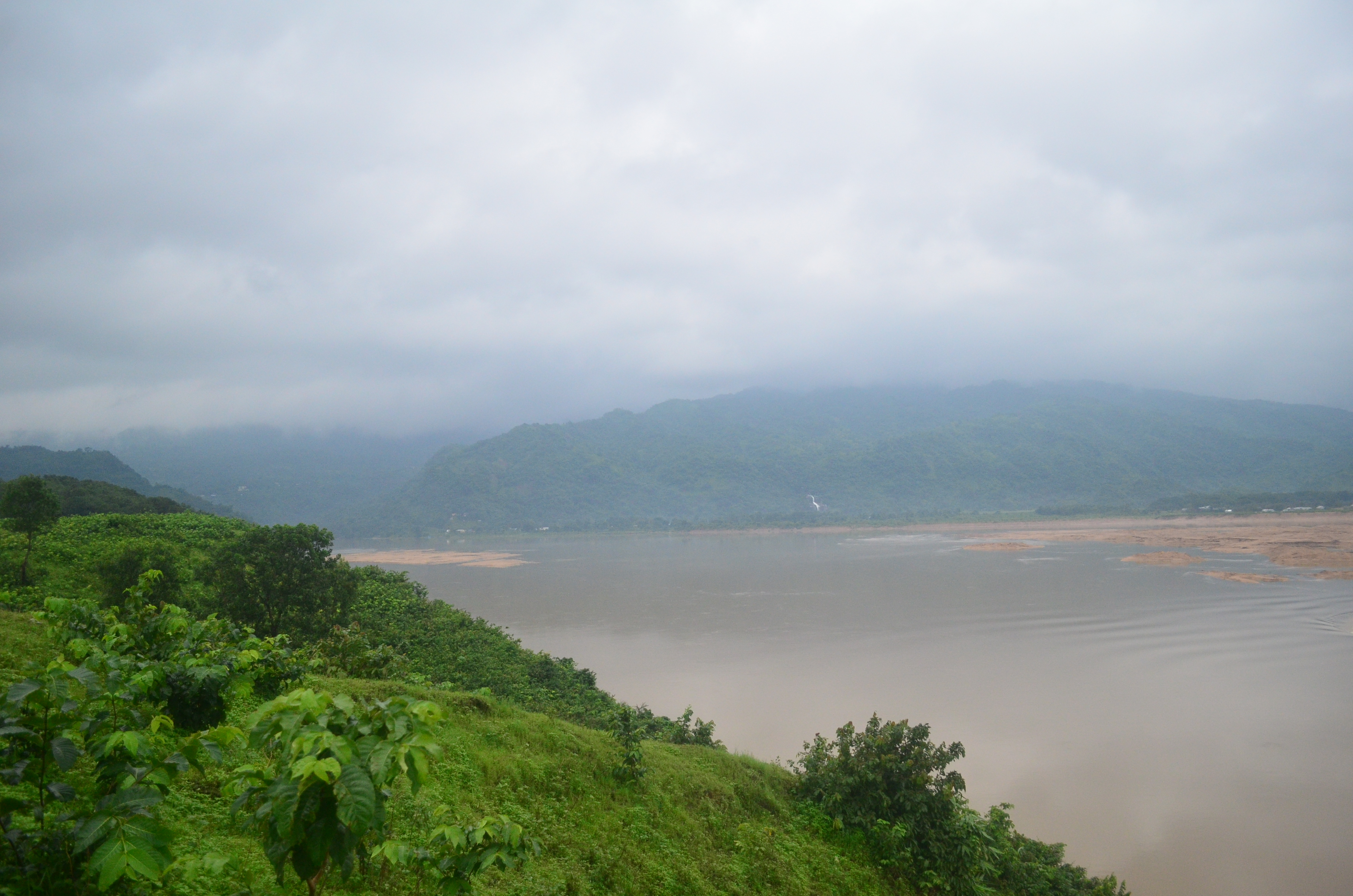

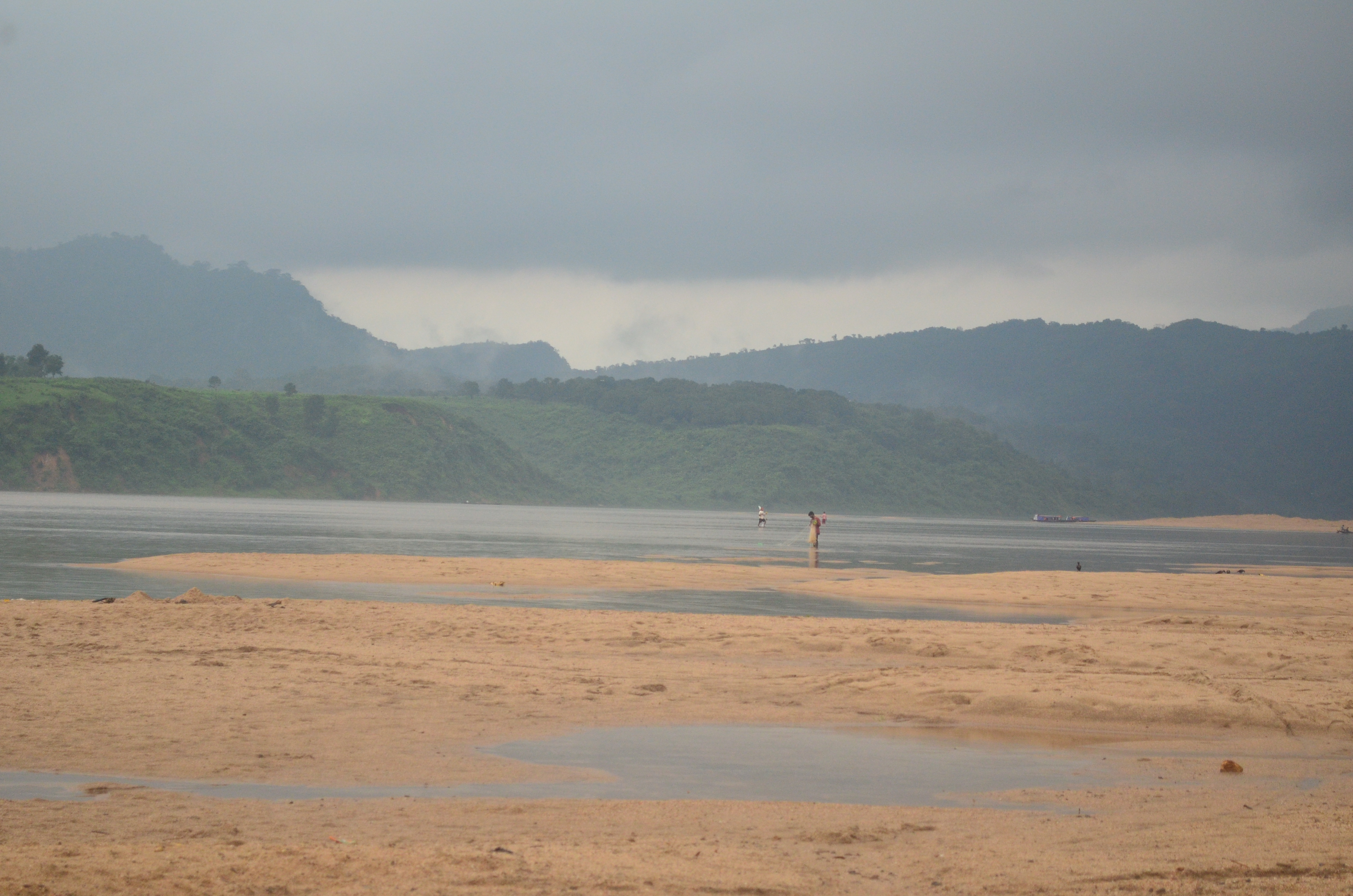

== See also ==
- Shimul Garden
- List of rivers in Bangladesh
- List of rivers of West Bengal
