= Kalyani Ghosh =

Bangladeshi singer (born 1946)

- কল্যাণী ঘোষ
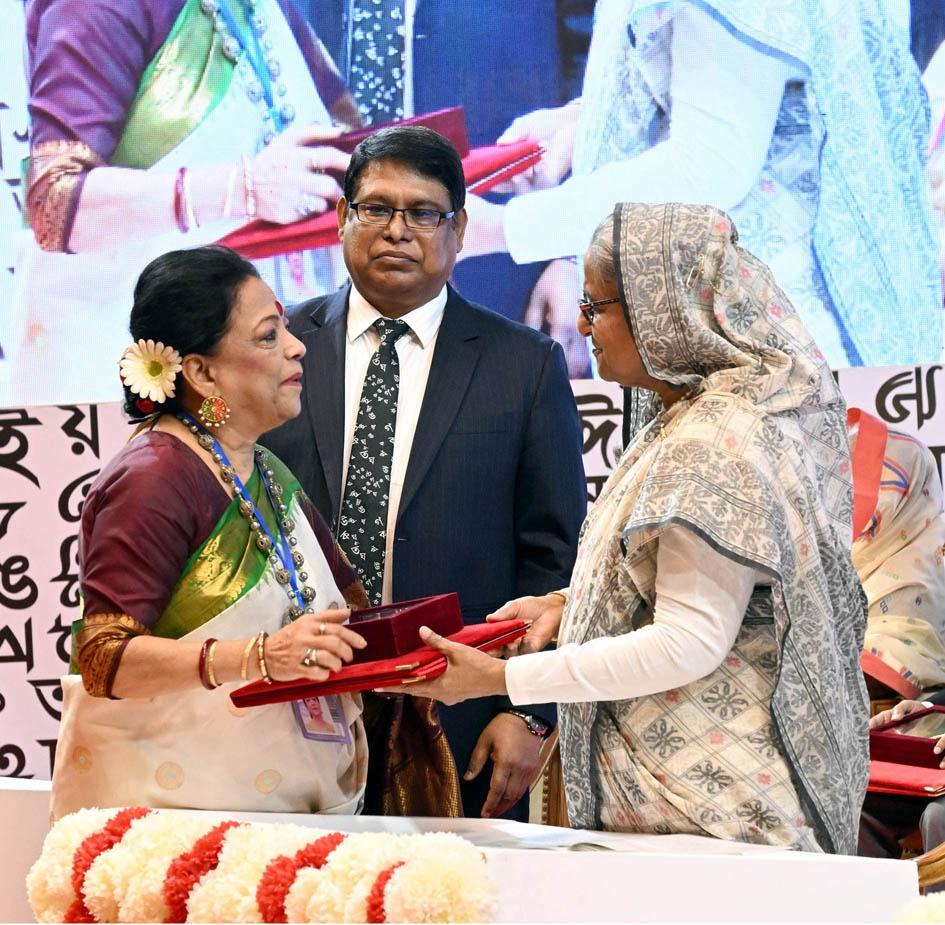
- Ghosh receiving 2024 Ekushey Padak
- Born: 1946 (age 79–80); Raozan, Chittagong, Bengal Province, British India
- Education: University of Chittagong
- Relatives: Uma Khan (sister); Probal Chowdhury (brother)

Kalyani Ghosh (born 1946) is a Bangladeshi singer. She was an artist of Swadhin Bangla Betar Kendra during the Bangladesh Liberation War. She was awarded the Ekushey Padak by the government of Bangladesh in 2024 for her special contribution to music.

== Life ==
Ghosh was born in 1946 into a musical family in the present-day Raozan Upazila of Chittagong. Her father's name was Manomohan Chowdhury and her mother's name was Lilabati Chowdhury. Of the couple's eight children, six of them, including her, were artists of Swadhin Bangla Betar Kendra: Uma Khan, Probal Chowdhury, Swapon Chowdhury, Devi Chowdhury, and Purnima Das. Kalyani started learning music from her mother at the age of five. She was a student of the first batch of the Bengali department of University of Chittagong.

In 1971, during the Bangladesh Liberation War, Ghosh was teaching at the prestigious St. Placid's School in Chittagong. After the independence of Bangladesh, she was listed as a regular artist on Bangladesh Television and Bangladesh Betar. She later retired in 2005 as the deputy director of Bangla Academy.

=== Song and award ===
Ghosh was awarded the Ekushey Padak by the government of Bangladesh in 2024. Recipient of the 'Bangladesh Shilpakala Academy Award' and the 'Shahid Smriti Sangskritik Parishad Award'. She has performed in many countries around the world, including India, the United States, and the United Kingdom. Kalyani has released several albums, including Swadhinotar Gaan and Amar Sonar Bangla.
