= Moksha (disambiguation) =

Moksha is a concept in Indian religions.

Moksha may also refer to:

- Mokshas, an ethnic group of European Russia
- Moksha language, a Uralic language
- Moksha (2001 film), a Bollywood film
- Moksha (2011 film), a Telugu-language film
- Moksha (festival), Netaji Subhas University of Technology, New Delhi, India
- Moksha (Jainism), a Sanskrit or Prakrit term meaning liberation, salvation or emancipation of soul
- Moksha Records, an English electronic music record company
- Moksha (river), Russia
- moksha (with lower-case "m", also called "Jehannum"), a character in Stephen R. Donaldson's The Chronicles of Thomas Covenant, the Unbeliever
- Moksha, a fictional drug in Aldous Huxley's Island
- Moksha (window manager), the computer desktop environment of Bodhi Linux

== See also ==
- Mokshan, an urban-type settlement in Penza Oblast, Russia
- Mukti (disambiguation)
- Mukta (disambiguation)
- Nirvana (disambiguation), another similar concept of Indian religions
