= Representation of the Faroes, Reykjavík =

Representative office of the Faroe Islands in Iceland

Representation of the Faroes in Reykjavík
- Location: Reykjavík, Iceland
- Address: Túngata 14, 3rd floor
- High Commissioner: Mrs. Halla Nolsøe Poulsen

The Representation of the Faroes in Reykjavík (Faroese: Sendistova Føroya í Reykjavík) is the official representative office of the Faroe Islands in Iceland. The Representation opened in 2007 after being established with the signing of the Hoyvík Free Trade Agreement in 2005.

== Hoyvík Agreement ==
A free trade agreement between the Faroes and Iceland was signed on 31 August 2005 and was approved in parliament in April 2006. The agreement extends the scope of cooperation between the two countries to the free movement of all goods, services, capital and persons, in effect creating a Faroese - Icelandic common market.

== See also ==
- Faroe Islands
- Politics of the Faroe Islands
- List of diplomatic missions in Iceland
- Danish Realm
- Representation of the Faroes, Copenhagen
