= Athletics at the 1995 Summer Universiade – Men's marathon =

The men's marathon event at the 1995 Summer Universiade was held on 3 September in Fukuoka, Japan.

== Results ==
Rank	Athlete	Nationality	Time	Notes
1st place, gold medalist(s)	Takaki Morikawa	Japan	2:21:32	
2nd place, silver medalist(s)	Patrick Muturi	Kenya	2:24:29	
3rd place, bronze medalist(s)	Kim Yi-yong	South Korea	2:24:43	
4	Yasuhiro Furui	Japan	2:26:17	
5	Alejandro Cruz	Mexico	2:28:24	
6	Donelly Larson	United States	2:30:23	
7	John Tsotetsi	South Africa	2:32:07	
8	Nobuhiko Chiba	Japan	2:35:13	
9	Juma Nkuwi	Tanzania	2:39:52	
10	Donovan Wright	South Africa	2:44:30	
11	Mukti Pathak	Nepal	2:54:09	
	István Pintér	Hungary	DNF	
	Michael Dudley	United States	DNF	
	Bruce Raymer	Canada	DNF	
	Mahendra Maharjan	Nepal	DNF	
	Ko Jung-won	South Korea	DNF	
	Kim Min-woo	South Korea	DNF	
	Valeriy Chesak	Ukraine	DNF	
	Khaled Al-Hada	Yemen	DNF	
	Muino Armachande Taquidir	Mozambique	DNF	
