= Embassy of Bangladesh, Copenhagen =

- Address: Strandvejen 336, 2930 Gentofte, Copenhagen, Denmark
- Coordinates: 55°46′16″N 12°35′42″E
- Opened: 2015
- Ambassador: Dr. Zokey Ahad
- Jurisdiction: Denmark, Estonia, Iceland
- Website: Embassy, Copenhagen

The Embassy of Bangladesh, Copenhagen is a diplomatic mission of Bangladesh located in Denmark. It is headed by the ambassador of Bangladesh to Denmark. The embassy located in Gentofte area of Greater Copenhagen.

== History ==
Following the 1971 War of Independence, Denmark officially recognized the newly sovereign state of Bangladesh in 1972, initiating formal diplomatic relations between the two nations. For the first four decades of this partnership, Bangladesh did not maintain a resident mission in Copenhagen. Instead, diplomatic engagement with Denmark was handled through concurrent accreditation via the Embassy of Bangladesh in Stockholm, Sweden, alongside local honorary consulates within Denmark.

In late 2014, the Government of Bangladesh decided to establish a dedicated diplomatic mission in Copenhagen to expand its presence across the Nordic region. Muhammad Abdul Muhith was appointed as the first resident Ambassador to Denmark, overseeing the setting up of the chancery during 2015. The establishment of this physical outpost reflected a strategic focus on expanding bilateral trade, encouraging green energy investments, and catering to the expanding Bangladeshi expatriate population.

The embassy officially opened its doors and became fully operational in May 2016. Located at Strandvejen 336 in the northern Copenhagen suburb of Klampenborg, the mission serves as the primary diplomatic anchor for Denmark while maintaining concurrent ambassadorial accreditation to both Estonia and Iceland to facilitate bilateral consults, green transition partnerships, and trade cooperation.
