= Mukti (magazine) =

Historic British feminist magazine

- Categories: Feminism, Women's liberation
- Frequency: Quarterly
- Founded: 1983
- Company: Mukti Collective
- Based in: London, Birmingham, UK

Mukti magazine, founded in 1983 was a quarterly British Asian magazine written and run primarily in London and Birmingham by a collective of Asian women, the 'Mukti Collective'. Mukti has been contextualised as being part of a second wave of Black British and South Asian feminist periodicals. Although based primarily in London and Birmingham, the magazine had international readership including readers from Amsterdam and India. The title referred to political and spiritual liberation. It was available by subscription, through a distribution agent named "Full Time Distribution" and by direct sales via Mukti's office. They received funding from the Greater London Council and Camden Council. The text was published in six different languages - English, Urdu, Hindi, Gujarati, Bengali and Punjabi - in order to make it accessible to as many readers as possible both to read and contribute to the magazine.

== Origins ==
In London, Mukti had an office at 213 Eversholt Street, Camden.

Mukti was founded as part of the Asian women's movement which had grown from the late 1970s and inspired by Asian-women led campaigns such as the Grunwick Strike in 1976 and publications such as Amrit Wilson's Finding a Voice: Asian Women in Britain (1978). Within a wider movement of liberation activism led by Black and Asian women, and gay and lesbian activism, Mukti is contextualised with magazines including the Organisation of Women of African and Asian Descent's FOWAAD newsletter, Speak Out, and We Are Here.

It provided a space for British Asian women's perspectives not available in the white mainstream and white feminist medias which usually either ignored or victimised Asian women and vilified Asian cultures without taking into account the nuances of the experiences, identities and oppression of Asian women or their agency. An editorial in Issue 6 emphasised that "Mukti is not only about being a magazine - it is about participation in the community. Our work also encompasses holding workshops to pass on skills, developing and contributing to various forms of representing Asian women's experiences, working with Asian girls in schools and clubs".

== Key Issues ==
The magazine functioned as a space for British Asian women and their voices to be heard, it included articles, poems and imagery created by members and subscribers as well as provided information for additional advice services and information across London. Mukti played and important role in distributing practical information for feminist and anti-racist activism among South Asian communities in Britain as well as providing a forum for debate, dissensus and consciousness raising. Mukti has been celebrated as being a strategically important node for building coalitional feminist politics across a wide spectrum of British South Asian communities.

Articles and letters often focussed on intersectional challenges, or the "interconnected nature of gendered, race and class oppression". Contributors offered readers advice and guidance on a range of issues:

- Immigration - e.g published an article by 'Shan and Hansa' explaining the effects of the British Nationality Act 1981 on women
- Housing
- Employment and working conditions - e.g republished an article by Mira Savara from Eve's Weekly (India) which included a section about an ongoing strike by over 3,000 women workers of the textile industry in Bombay
- Education - e.g published an article by Adshan Salaria on the necessity for Asian children to continue to speak and be educated in their first language in schools

== Notable contributors ==
The Mukti Collective included many artists and teachers. The photographer Mumtaz Karimjee was involved in the magazine, helping with layouts and including her own photographic work. Prominent artist Chila Burman designed a front cover and wrote an article on shared ownership housing.

Other members included Adarsh Sood, Amina Patel, Kiran Patel, Meena Sarin, Rita Dutta, Pramile Pai and Burman and Zarina Bhimji.

== Legacy ==
Issues of Mukti are held by national archives including the British Library, London, the Women's Library at the London School of Economics, the Feminist Library in Peckham, the Black Cultural Archives, and the Glasgow Women's Library deposit from the Camden Lesbian Centre and Black Lesbian Group.

Issue of Mukti were displayed in the Tate Britain's 'Women in Revolt' exhibition, November 2023-April 2024.
