= Hoyvík Agreement =

Trade agreement between the Faroe Islands and Iceland

Agreement between the Government of Iceland, of the one part, and the Government of Denmark and the Home Government of the Faroe Islands, of the other part
- Type: Bilateral trade
- Signed: 31 August 2005
- Location: Hoyvík, Faroe Islands
- Condition: Approval by Løgting and Althing
- Signatories: Iceland; Faroe Islands
- Languages: Danish; English; Faroese; Icelandic

The Hoyvík Agreement is a free trade agreement between the Faroe Islands and Iceland.

== History ==
The agreement was signed 31 August 2005 in the town of Hoyvík in the Faroe Islands. The Faroese Løgting ratified the agreement on 2 May 2006 and the Icelandic Alþingi did the same on 3 June.

On 21 August 2006, a statement was made by the annual general meeting of the West Nordic Council that the possibility of extending the agreement to include Greenland (thus creating a West Nordic free trade zone) should be seriously studied. It was noted at Løgting that the agreement could be extended to Norway and Canada that since has happen as of August 24 2025.

== See also ==
- Foreign relations of Iceland
- Representation of the Faroes, Reykjavík
- West Nordic Council
