= Nirvana (Zoot Sims and Bucky Pizzarelli album) =

Studio album by Zoot Sims and Bucky Pizzarelli
- Released: 1974
- Recorded: April 22, 1974
- Studio: New York City, NY
- Genre: Jazz
- Length: 40:43
- Label: Groove Merchant; GM 533
- Producer: Sonny Lester

Zoot Sims chronology
Zoot Sims' Party (1974)	Nirvana (1974)	Strike Up the Band (1975)

Bucky Pizzarelli chronology
Playing the Piano Music of Bix Beiderbecke (1974)	Nirvana (1974)	Strike Up the Band (1975)

Nirvana is an album by American jazz saxophonist Zoot Sims and guitarist Bucky Pizzarelli with special guest Buddy Rich recorded in 1974 and released on the Groove Merchant label.

Professional ratings
Review scores
Source	Rating
Allmusic	4/5 stars

== Track listing ==
1. "Somerset" (Torrie Zito) – 4:11
2. "Honeysuckle Rose" (Fats Waller, Andy Razaf) – 3:57
3. "A Summer Thing" (Zito) – 3:19
4. "Somebody Loves Me" (George Gershwin, Ballard MacDonald, Buddy DeSylva) – 3:35
5. "Gee, Baby, Ain't I Good to You" (Don Redman, Razaf) – 2:55
6. "Nirvana" (Zoot Sims) – 4:14
7. "Indiana" (James F. Hanley, MacDonald) – 4:02
8. "Memories of You" (Eubie Blake, Razaf) – 4:05
9. "Come Rain or Come Shine" (Harold Arlen, Johnny Mercer) – 4:35
10. "Up a Lazy River" (Hoagy Carmichael, Sidney Arodin) – 3:22
11. "Send in the Clowns" (Stephen Sondheim) – 2:28

== Personnel ==
- Zoot Sims – tenor saxophone, vocals on track 5
- Bucky Pizzarelli – guitar
- Milt Hinton – bass
- Buddy Rich – drums (tracks 1–4 & 6–11), vocals on track 5
- Stan Kay – drums (track 5)
