= USS Nirvana II =

Patrol vessel of the United States Navy

History

United States
- Name: USS Nirvana II
- Namesake: Previous name retained
- Builder: Brett Brothers, West Lynn, Massachusetts
- Completed: 1916
- Acquired: 18 May 1917
- Commissioned: 18 May 1917
- Decommissioned: 30 November 1918
- Fate: Returned to owner 2 December 1918
- Notes: Operated as civilian motorboat Nirvana II 1916-1917 and from December 1918

General characteristics
- Type: Patrol vessel
- Displacement: 51 tons
- Length: 65 ft (20 m)
- Beam: 15 ft (4.6 m)
- Draft: 6 ft (1.8 m)
- Speed: 12 knots
- Armament: 1 × 1-pounder gun; 1 × machine gun

USS Nirvana II (SP-204) was a United States Navy patrol vessel in commission from 1917 to 1918.

Nirvana II was built as a civilian motorboat of the same name in 1916 by Brett Brothers at West Lynn, Massachusetts. The U.S. Navy acquired her from her owner, J. Hartley Merrick of Philadelphia, Pennsylvania, on 18 May 1917 for World War I service as a patrol vessel. She was commissioned as USS Nirvana II (SP-204) the same day.

Nirvana II was assigned to the 4th Naval District, headquartered at Philadelphia, during the war, alternating between the Northern Patrol Area and the Southern Patrol Area along the United States East Coast. The routine was interrupted in June 1917 when she took to high seas patrol from 9 to 12 June and dispatch boat duty from 13 to 16 June. In September 1917, she joined the Special Cruising Squadron, adding status to her patrol duties.

After a respite at the Philadelphia Navy Yard on League Island in Philadelphia in February 1918, Nirvana II was based at Reedy Island in the Delaware River and shuttled from one island to another around Philadelphia. She remained at this work until dispatch duty to New Castle, Delaware, in August 1918. Thereafter she moved up to Essington, Pennsylvania, for boarding duty in September 1918.

Decommissioning at Philadelphia on 30 November 1918, Nirvana II was returned to her owner on 2 December 1918.

USS Nirvana II should not be confused with another patrol vessel in commission during 1917 under the name USS Nirvana (SP-706).
