= USS Nirvana (SP-706) =

Patrol vessel of the United States Navy

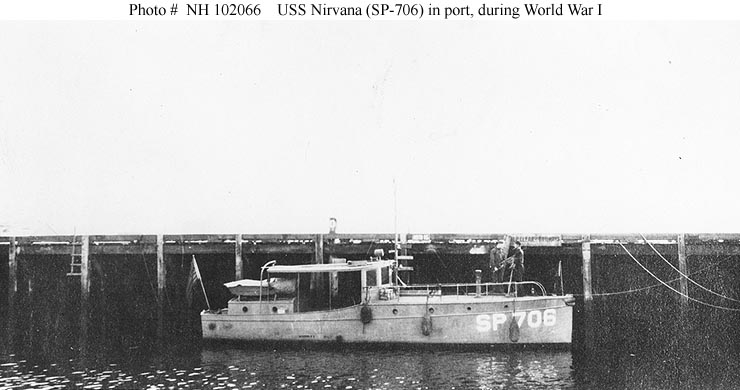
- USS Nirvana, later USS SP-706, sometime during World War I.

History

United States
- Name: USS Nirvana )1917); USS SP-706 (1918)
- Namesake: Nirvana was a previous name retained; SP-706 was her section patrol boat number
- Builder: S. O. Hauser, Staten Island, New York
- Completed: 1915
- Acquired: 21 May 1917
- Commissioned: 10 August 1917
- Decommissioned: 31 December 1917
- Recommissioned: 18 April 1918
- Decommissioned: 20 January 1919
- Renamed: USS SP-706 April 1918
- Fate: Returned to owner 20 January 1919
- Notes: Operated as civilian motorboat Tarpon II and Nirvana 1915-1917 and Nirvana from 1919

General characteristics
- Type: Patrol vessel
- Length: 40 ft (12 m)
- Beam: 10 ft (3.0 m)
- Draft: 2 ft 6 in (0.76 m)
- Speed: 18 miles per hour
- Armament: 1 × machine gun

USS Nirvana (SP-706), later USS SP-706, was a United States Navy patrol vessel in commission in 1917 and from 1918 to 1919.

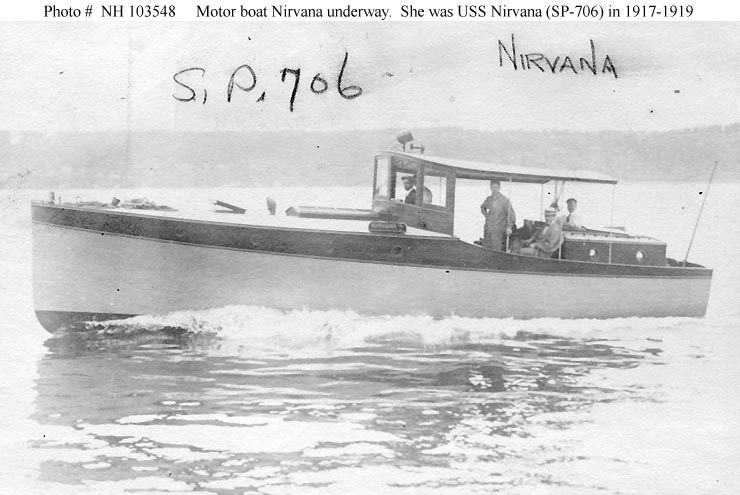
Nirvana as a civilian motorboat sometime between 1915 and 1917, prior to her U.S. Navy service.

Nirvana was built as the civilian motorboat Tarpon II in 1915 by S.O. Hauser at Staten Island, New York. She later was renamed Nirvana.

The U.S. Navy acquired Nirvana from her owner, M. S. Martin, on 21 May 1917 for World War I service as a patrol vessel on the section patrol. She was commissioned as USS Nirvana (SP-706) on 10 August 1917.

Assigned to the 3rd Naval District, Nirvana reported to Fort Lafayette in New York Harbor on 18 August 1917 and patrolled between City Island in the Bronx and Fort Lafayette until decommissioned on 31 December 1917.

Recommissioning on 18 April 1918, Nirvana was renamed USS SP-706. She steamed to Erie, Pennsylvania, arriving there on 10 June 1918, and transferred to the 10th Naval District. She patrolled the Great Lakes through the end of World War I.

Returning to Marine Basin in New York City on 8 December 1918, SP-706 was decommissioned on 20 January 1919 and returned to her owner the same day.

USS Nirvana should not be confused with another patrol vessel in commission from 1917 to 1918 under the name USS Nirvana II (SP-204).
