= Representation of the Faroes, Copenhagen =

Diplomatic mission of the Faroe Islands in Denmark

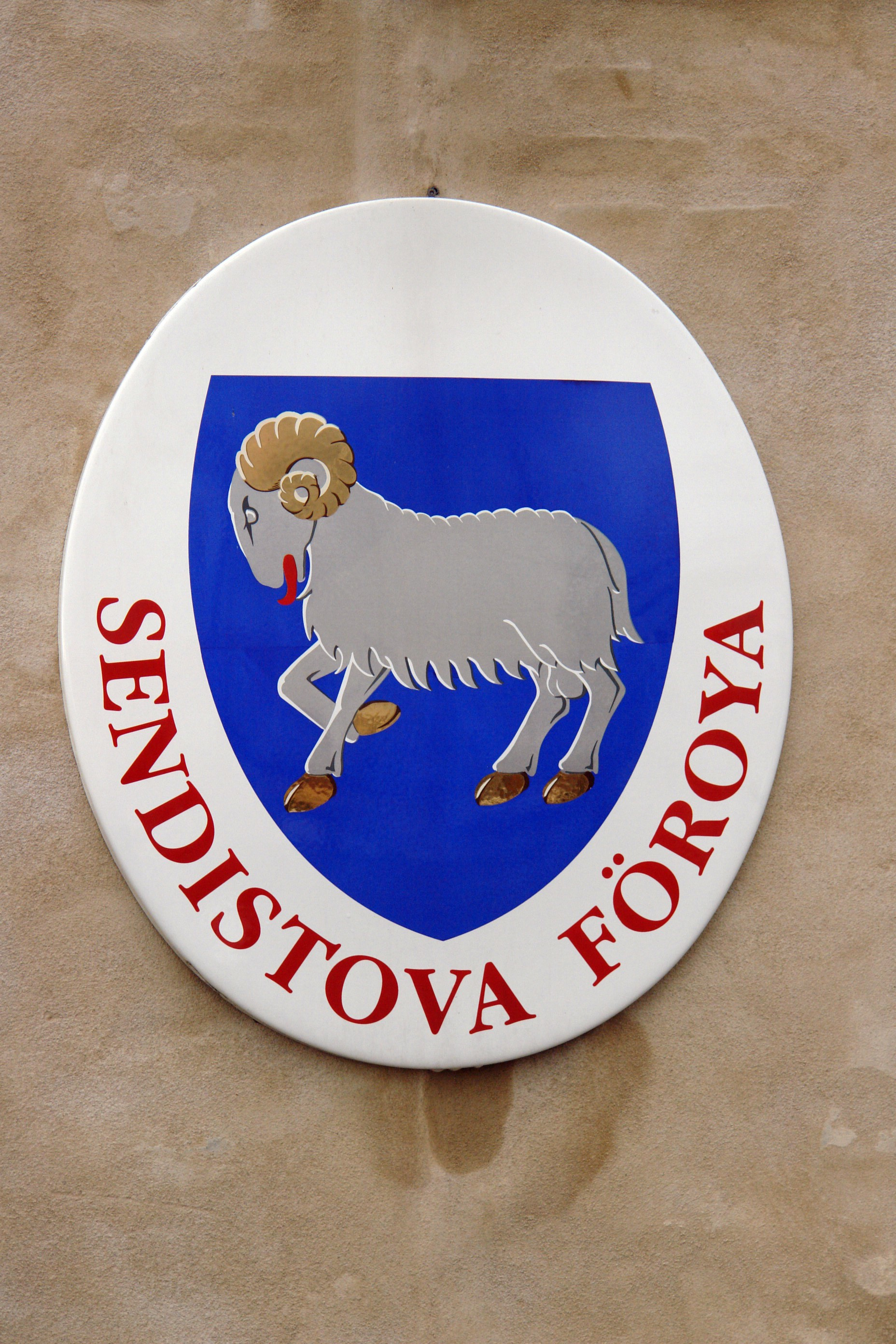
The Representation of the Faroes in Copenhagen, Færøernes Repræsentation i København Sendistova Føroya í Keypmannahavn

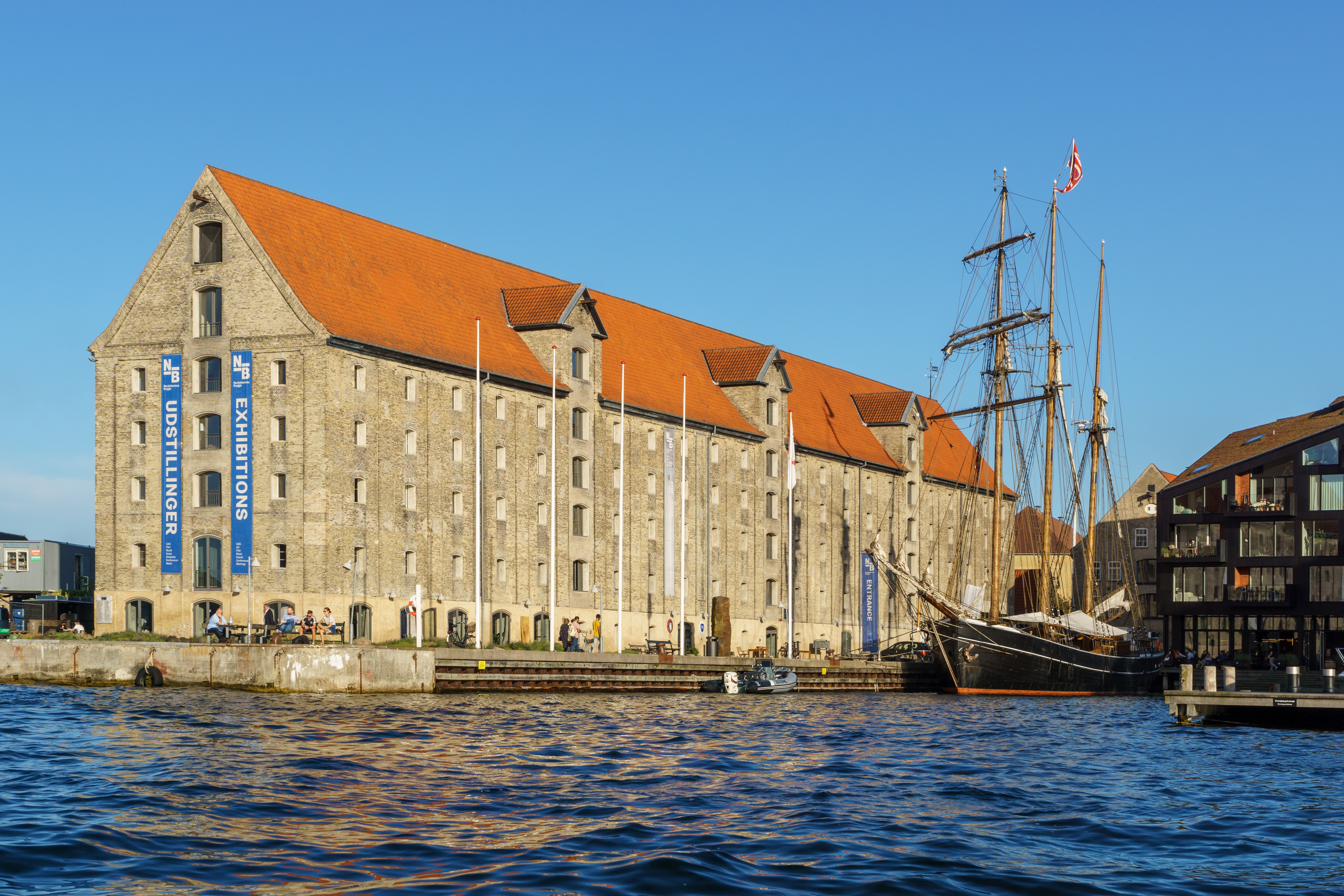
- The mission is located in the North Atlantic House cultural centre
- Address: Strandgade 91, Copenhagen
- Coordinates: 55.6777°N 12.5966°E
- Opened: 1979
- High Commissioner: Jóannes Vitalis Hansen
- Website: uvmr.fo

The Representation of the Faroes, Copenhagen (Danish: Færøernes Repræsentation i København, Faroese: Sendistova Føroya í Keypmannahavn) is the representation of the Faroe Islands to Denmark. The representation opened in 1979 and is dedicated to promote and coordinate the interests of the Faroe Islands in Denmark. It is the second oldest representation of the Faroe Islands abroad after its representation to the European Union.

== History ==
When the representation opened in 1979, it was initially to provide assistance for Faroese companies situated in Denmark. However, it took a more political orientation during its second year of operation. It became rearranged in such a manner that it would become the natural center for political exchanges between Denmark and the Faroe Islands. The representation moreover maintains contacts with the other diplomatic missions in Copenhagen.

The North Atlantic House has housed the Faroese representation since November 2003.

== List of representatives ==
| Name | Term start date |
|---|---|
| Tryggvi Johansen | 1 August 1979 |
| Herálvur Joensen | 1 March 2006 |
| Sigmundur Isfeld | 1 September 2012 |
| Jóannes Vitalis Hansen | 1 October 2019 (incumbent) |

== See also ==
- High Commission of Denmark, Tórshavn
- Representation of the Faroes, Reykjavík
