= Probal Chowdhury =

- প্রবাল চৌধুরী
- Born: 1947; Chittagong district, Bengal Province, British India
- Died: 17 October 2009 (aged 61–62); Chittagong, Bangladesh
- Occupation: Singer
- Known for: Swadhin Bangla Betar Kendra broadcasts (1971)
- Relatives: Uma (sister); Kalyani (sister)

Probal Chowdhury (1947 – 17 October 2009) was a Bangladeshi freedom fighter, playback singer and composer. He rendered several songs from Swadhin Bangla Betar Kendra during the Bangladesh Liberation War. After the war, he pursued his solo career in playback.

== Early life ==
Probal Chowdhury was born in 1947 in Chittagong district in the then Bengal Province, British India (now in Bangladesh). (Note: Sources vary as to where in Chittagong district he was born, and when. At least one places his birth at Rahmatganj in Chittagong on 20 May, others say he hailed from Binajuri village in what is now Raozan Upazila, and was born on 25 August.) He was the sixth of Manmohan and Lilabati Chowdhury's ten children.

== Career ==
Chowdhury made his radio debut in 1966. In 1971, during the Bangladesh Liberation War, the family evacuated to Calcutta, India. There he, his elder sister Kalyani Ghosh, and younger sister Uma Khan joined Swadhin Bangla Betar Kendra, the radio station of the Bangladesh government in exile, as singers. In 2017, the government of Bangladesh recognized them as freedom fighters in acknowledgment of their contribution to the war effort.

After the war, Chowdhury continued to sing on albums, radio, Bangladesh Television, and in films. Among the songs he is remembered for are "Lokey jodi mondo koy sheto nohey porajoy", "Ami dhonyo hoyechhi ogo dhonyo tomari premer jonyo" in the film Sona Bou, and "Phuler bashor bhanglo jokhon" in the 1984 film Chandranath.

Chowdhury retired in 2004 from Bangladesh Chemical Industries Corporation in Chittagong, where he was an assistant manager.

== Personal life ==
Chowdhury had two sons, Tapas Chowdhury and Ranjan Chowdhury.

Chowdhury died in Chittagong on 17 October 2009.
