= Faroe Islands–United Kingdom relations =

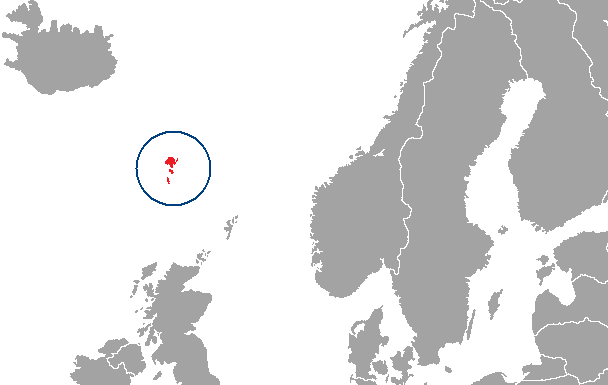

- Faroe Islands: United Kingdom

Diplomatic mission
- Representation of the Faroe Islands, London: Consulate of the United Kingdom, Tórshavn

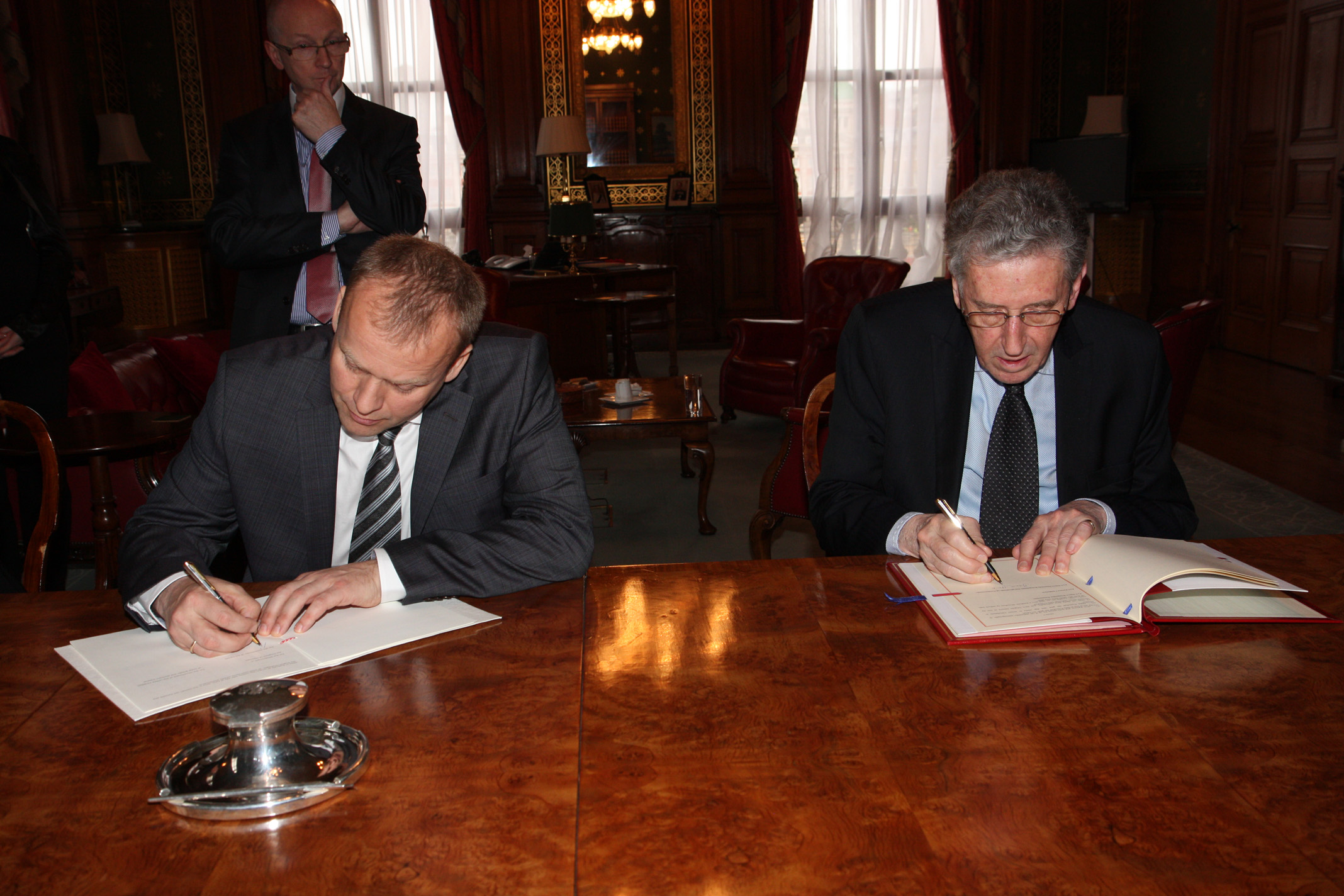
Faroese Prime Minister Kaj Leo Johannesen with British Foreign Office Minister Lord Howell in London, April 2012.

The Faroe Islands–United Kingdom relations are the foreign and bilateral relations between the Faroe Islands and the United Kingdom of Great Britain and Northern Ireland. The Faroe Islands and the United Kingdom share a close and multifaceted relationship characterized by historical ties, geographical proximity, and strong political, economic, and cultural cooperation.

Bilaterally the two countries have a Double Taxation Agreement, and a Free Trade Agreement.

== History ==
The UK occupied Faroe Islands from 1940 until 1945, when the Faroe Islands were returned to Denmark.

== Economic relations ==
Faroe Islands–United Kingdom Free Trade Agreement
Free Trade Agreement between the United Kingdom of Great Britain and Northern Ireland and the Kingdom of Denmark in respect of the Faroe Islands
- Type: Free trade agreement
- Context: Trade continuity agreement between the Faroe Islands and the United Kingdom
- Signed: 31 January 2019
- Location: London, England, United Kingdom
- Effective: 1 January 2021
- Signatories: Poul Michelsen; George Hollingbery
- Parties: Denmark; United Kingdom
- Language: English; Faroese

The Free Trade Agreement between the United Kingdom and the Kingdom of Denmark, in respect of the Faroe Islands, was signed on 31 January 2019 in London. This agreement was established to continue and strengthen the trade relationship between the UK and the Faroe Islands following Brexit. Although the Faroe Islands are a self-governing territory within the Kingdom of Denmark, the agreement was officially signed by Denmark on behalf of the Faroe Islands. The treaty is bilingual, with both English and Faroese versions holding equal authority, though the English text prevails in cases of discrepancy. The agreement facilitates tariff-free trade and cooperation on sanitary and phytosanitary measures, thereby maintaining important economic ties between the UK and the Faroe Islands. English is the primary working language used in the implementation and administration of this FTA. This accord ensures stability and continuity in trade, benefiting both parties economically.

From 1 January 1997 until 30 December 2020, trade between the Faroe Islands and the UK was governed by the European Community–Faroe Islands Agreement, while the United Kingdom was a member of the European Union.

Following the withdrawal of the United Kingdom from the European Union, the UK and the Faroe Islands signed the Faroe Islands–United Kingdom Free Trade Agreement on 19 January 2019. The Faroe Islands–United Kingdom Free Trade Agreement is a continuity trade agreement, based on the EU free trade agreement, which entered into force on 1 January 2021. Trade value between the Faroe Islands and the United Kingdom was worth £1,923 million in 2022.

== Diplomatic missions ==
- The Faroe Islands maintains a representation in London.
- The United Kingdom is accredited to the Faroe Islands through its consulate in Tórshavn.

== See also ==
- Foreign relations of Denmark
- Foreign relations of the Faroe Islands
- Foreign relations of the United Kingdom
