= Hason Raja (2002 film) =

- Theatrical poster
- হাছন রাজা
- Directed by: Chashi Nazrul Islam
- Written by: Momtazuddin Ahmed
- Screenplay by: Shahidullah Dulal
- Produced by: Helal Khan
- Starring: Helal Khan; Shomi Kaiser; Mukti; Bobita; Shimla; Amol Bose
- Cinematography: Momtazuddin Ahmed
- Edited by: Atiqur Rahman Mollik
- Music by: Shujeo Shyam
- Distributed by: Hasok Production
- Release date: 17 August 2002
- Running time: 157 minutes
- Country: Bangladesh
- Language: Bengali

Hason Raja (Bengali: হাছন রাজা; also known as Hason: The King) is a Bengali film from Bangladesh, directed by Chashi Nazrul Islam and produced by actor Helal Khan. This film is based on the biography of poet and philosopher of Bangladesh Hason Raja This film was released in Bangladesh, the UK and the USA on 17 August 2002 and won National Film Awards in best film category and other six categories.

== Cast ==
- Helal Khan – Hason Raja
- Shomi Kaiser – Binodini
- Mukti – Hason's Wife
- Bobita – Hason's Mother
- Shimla – Dancer
- Amol Bose
- Shanu
- Khurshiduzzaman Utpol
- Rebeka Moni

== Soundtrack ==
The music of the film was directed by Shujeo Shyam and lyrics were penned by Arkum Shah, Kala Shah, Radha Romon, and Hason Raja. Subir Nandi, Shakila Jafar, Agun, Uma Khan, Polash, Bidit Lal Das sang in this film.

== Awards ==
Award Title	Category	Awardee	Result
National Film Awards	Best Film	Helal Khan (Producer)	Won
National Film Awards	Best Actress in a Supporting Role	Bobita	Won
National Film Awards	Best Music Director	Shujeo Shyam	Won
National Film Awards	Best Female Playback Singer	Uma Khan	Won
National Film Awards	Best Screenplay	Shahidullah Dulal	Won
National Film Awards	Best Art Director	Uttam Guha	Won
National Film Awards	Best Makeup	Rahman	Won
