= Alauddin Ali discography =

Discography

Alauddin Ali was a Bangladeshi film score composer. He has scored music for 154 films. The following is a complete list of films he has scored for:

== 1970s ==
Year	Film	Notes
1976	Bondini	
1978	Badhu Biday	
1978	Fakir Majnu Shah	
1978	Golapi Ekhon Traine	Winner: Bangladesh National Film Award for Best Music Director
1979	Jibon Mrityu	
1979	Nagordola	
1979	Noder Chand	
1979	Priyo Bandhobi	
1979	Sikander	penned lyrics also
1979	Sonar Horin	
1979	Sundori	Winner: Bangladesh National Film Award for Best Music Director
1979	Surjo Dighol Bari	

== 1980s ==
Year	Album	Notes
1980	Anarkoli	
1980	Apon Bhai	
1980	Chompa Chameli	
1980	Etim	
1980	Gangchil	
1980	Koshai	Winner: Bangladesh National Film Award for Best Music Director
1981	Jhumka	
1981	Jonmo Theke Jolchi	Winner: Bachsas Award for Best Music Director
1981	Kajol Lota	only one song ("E Jibon Modhumoy Seto")
1981	Sakkhi	
1982	Boro Barir Meye	
1982	Dui Poisar Alta	penned lyrics also
1982	Nalish	
1983	Andho Bodhu	
1983	Asha	
1983	Banjaran	
1983	Najma	
1983	Ondho Bodhu	
1983	Prem Nogor	
1983	Shimar	
1984	Bhat De	
1984	Himmotwali	
1984	Maan Abhiman	
1984	Nosib	
1984	Notun Prithibi	
1984	Pension	
1984	SokhinarJuddho	
1985	Dorodi Shotru	
1985	Manik Roton	
1985	Miss Lolita	
1985	Premkahini	
1985	Premik	wrote lyrics also
1985	Rai Binodini	
1986	Aghat	
1986	Bhai Bondhu	
1986	Mala Bodol	
1986	Sud Asol	
1987	Chondidas O Rojokini	
1987	Didar	
1987	Harano Sur	
1987	Niyot	
1987	Prem Biroho	
1987	Protibad	
1987	Rajlakshmi Srikanta	
1987	Swami Stree	penned lyrics also
1988	Agomon	penned lyrics also
1988	Heeramoti	
1988	Jogajog	Winner: Bangladesh National Film Award for Best Music Director
1988	Kathal Burir Bagan	
1989	Bidhata	
1989	Shorto	

== 1990s ==
Year	Album	Notes
1990	Karon	
1990	Lakhe Ekta	Winner: Bangladesh National Film Award for Best Music Director (also penned lyrics)
1990	Sajano Bagan	
1991	Badshah Bhai	
1991	Strir Paona	
1992	Jeler Meye Roshni	
1992	Padma Nadir Majhi	composed along with Goutam Ghosh
1992	Prem Jomuna	
1993	Bhoyongkor Saat Din	
1993	Ranjish (Urdu)	This is the only Urdu film composed by Alauddin Ali, he and Robin Ghosh composed the songs
1994	Banglar Maa	
1994	Chorom Aghat	
1994	Golapi Ekhon Dhakay	
1995	Adorer Sontan	
1995	Denmohor	
1995	Hingsar Agun	
1995	Priyo Tumi	
1995	Shesh Khela	
1995	Shesh Rokkha	
1995	Shilpi	composed along with Subal Das, Alam Khan, Ali Hossain, Ahmed Imtiaz Bulbul
1996	Attotyag	
1996	Bazigor	
1996	Chiro Reeni	
1996	Kobul	
1996	Shopner Prithibi	
1996	Sotter Mrittu Nei	
1997	Baba Keno Chakor	
1997	Bachar Lorai	
1997	Beimani	
1997	E Jibon Tomar Amar	
1997	Ekjon Birdohi	
1997	Fasi	
1997	Shudhu Tumi	
1998	Baba Keno Chakor	Indian remake of Bangladeshi film with the same title
1998	Dui Rongbaz	composed along with Ahmed Imtiaz Bulbul
1998	Ei Mon Tomake Dilam	
1998	Ochol Poisha	
1998	Prithibi Tomar Amar	
1999	Hridoye Lekha Naam	
1999	Khobor Ache	
1999	Miss Dayna	
1999	Sagarika	
1999	Sontan Jokhon Shotru	Winner: Bachsas Award for Best Music Director
1999	Sotyer Songram	

== 2000s ==
Year	Album	Notes
2000	Goriber Somman	
2000	Karishma	
2000	Premer Naam Bedona	
2000	Shot Bhai	
2001	Biplobi Jonota	
2001	Dil To Pagol	
2001	Meghla Akash	
2001	Moron Niye Khela	
2001	Shopner Bashor	
2002	Arman	
2002	Bhalobasha Kare Koy	
2002	Lal Doriya	Winner: Bangladesh National Film Award for Best Music Composer
2002	Oder Dhor	
2002	Pordeshi Babu	
2002	Streer Morjada	
2002	Sundori Bodhu	
2003	Baba	
2003	Big Boss	
2003	Kheya Ghater Majhi	
2003	Kokhono Megh Kokhono Brishti	
2003	Noyon Bhora Jol	
2003	Praner Manush	
2003	Shahoshi Manush Chai	penned lyrics also
2003	Stree Keno Shotru	
2004	Jibon Ek Songhorsho	
2004	Prem Korechi Besh Korechi	
2005	Kal Sokale	
2006	Bidrohi Padma	
2006	Dadima	
2006	Hridoyer Kotha	
2006	Koti Takar Kabin	
2006	Pitar Ason	
2007	Amar Praner Swami	
2008	Pashaner Prem	
2008	Tumi Amar Prem	
2009	Mayer Hate Beheshter Chabi	

== 2010s ==
Year	Album	Notes
2010	Golapi Ekhon Bilatey	Winner: Bachsas Award for Best Music Director
2010	Jibon Moroner Sathi	
2010	Mughal-e-Azam	
2010	Ora Amake Bhalo Hote Dilona	
2011	Hridoy Bhanga Dheu	
2013	Judge Barrister Police Commissioner	
2016	Poush Maser Pirit	
2017	Apaharan	composed along with Ashok Bhadra

== Year unknown ==
Film	Notes
Aporadhi	
Taser Ghor	

== Background score only ==
Year	Film	Score Composer	Notes
1975	Bandi Theke Begum	Azad Rahman	
1976	The Rain	Anwar Parvez	
2008	Ek Takar Bou	Shawkat Ali Emon	
2009	Swami Streer Wada	Kumar Bishwajit	

== Non-film songs ==
Year	Album/Single	Song	Writer(s)	Singer(s)
1972	Single	"O Amar Bangla Maa Tor"		Sabina Yasmin
N/A	Yeh Dil Tumhi Ko Diya	"Tumhi Ho Meri Aarzoo"		Sabina Yasmin
N/A	Yeh Dil Tumhi Ko Diya	"Main Kya Karu"		Sabina Yasmin
N/A	Single	"Ekta Golap Hate Niye"	Zia Ahmed Sheli	Andrew Kishore

=== Songs for television ===
Year	Show	Song	Songwriter(s)	Singer(s)
1978	Bangladesh Television	"Prothom Bangladesh Amar Shesh Bangladesh"	Moniruzzaman Monir	Shahnaz Rahmatullah
N/A	Anandamela	"Je Chhilo Drishtir Simanay"		Shahnaz Rahmatullah
N/A	Bornali	"Surjodoye Tumi"	Moniruzzaman Monir	Syed Abdul Hadi
N/A	Manik Chor (drama)	"Bondhu Teen Din"	Amjad Hossain	Runa Laila
