= Golapi (franchise) =

Golapi (film series)
- Created by: Amjad Hossain
- Original work: Golapi Ekhon Traine
- Owners: Shukla Films; Channel Touch Bangladesh
- Years: 1978-2010

Films and television
- Film(s): Golapi Ekhon Traine (1978) Golapi Ekhon Dhakay (1994) Golapi Ekhon Bilatey (2010)

Golapi is a Bangladeshi drama film series which is created by Amjad Hossain. The films resolves around Golapi and his life journey. There are 3 films in the series. The character Golapi is played by 2 actors throughout the film series. Bobita (Ekhon Golapi Traine, Ekhon Golapi Dhakay) and Moushumi (Ekhon Golapi Bilatey) played the role Golapi in the film series.

== Overview ==
=== Golapi Ekhon Traine (1978) ===
Mondol is an influential person in the village. His son Milon likes the girl of a street singer Golapi . In the meantime, Mondol brings a bridegroom for Golapi but they demand a cycle. Golapi's father cannot afford this so Milon pay for the cycle. But for some reason the marriage does not take place and Golapi's father commits suicide. As a result, Golapi's family fall into grief and she starts to work in different places by train. The people from the village do not take this positively and sit to desert them to work on trains.

=== Golapi Ekhon Dhakay (1994) ===
This is a story about Golapi a poor girls endless straggle life in capital city after harassment from rural life.

=== Golapi Ekhon Bilatey (2010) ===
Golapi divorces her husband and moves in with Mithun and his daughter, Tumpa, with the goal of raising Tumpa as her primary focus.

== Films ==
Film	Release date	Director	Writer	Producer	Ref.
Golapi Ekhon Traine	September 5, 1978	Amjad Hossain	Amjad Hossain	Amjad Hossain	
Golapi Ekhon Dhakay	September 30, 1994	Amjad Hossain	Amjad Hossain	Amjad Hossain	
Golapi Ekhon Bilatey	January 29, 2010	Amjad Hossain	Amjad Hossain	M.R. Haque & Syed Hassan	

=== Golapi Ekhon Traine ===
Golapi Ekhon Traine was the first film in the Golapi film series. The film is also known as The Endless Trail in English. Bobita was cast as Golapi. Golapi Ekhon Traine won 9 awards including Best Film, Best Director, Best Music Director, Best Actor in a Supporting Role, Best Actress in a Supporting Role, Best Lyrics, Best Male Playback Singer, Best Screenplay and Best Cinematography.

=== Golapi Ekhon Dhakay ===
Golapi Ekhon Dhakay was the second film in the Golapi film series. The sequel released after 16 years Golapi Ekhon Traine released, making it to be first Bangladeshi film series. Bobita again played the role of Golapi.

=== Golapi Ekhon Bilatey ===
Golapi Ekhon Bilatey was the 3rd and final film in the Golapi film series. Filming started in May 2006 and it was released on 29 January 2010 in Bangladesh. The film stars one of the most popular west-Bengal Indian actors, Mithun Chakraborty in one of the lead roles. And this time Moushumi was cast as Golapi.

== Cast and crew ==
=== Cast ===
Characters	Films			Ref.
Characters	Golapi Ekhon Traine	Golapi Ekhon Dhakay	Golapi Ekhon Bilatey	Ref.
Golapi	Bobita	Bobita	Moushumi	
Milon	Farooque	-	-	
Moina	Anwara Begum	Anwara Begum	-	
Oli	-	Ilias Kanchan	-	
Mondol	ATM Shamsuzzaman	-	-	
Alapi	Tarana Halim	Champa	-	
Buri	Rawshan Jamil	Rawshan Jamil		
Lalu Sardar	-	Sadek Bacchu	-	
Mithun	-	-	Mithun Chakraborty	
Reshmi	-	-	Rina Khan	

=== Crew ===
Crew	Films			Ref.
Crew	Golapi Ekhon Traine	Golapi Ekhon Dhakay	Golapi Ekhon Bilatey	Ref.
Director	Amjad Hossain	Amjad Hossain	Amjad Hossain	
Producer	Amjad Hossain	Amjad Hossain	M.R. Haque & Syed Hassan	
Writer	Amjad Hossain	Amjad Hossain	Amjad Hossain	
Composer	Alauddin Ali	-	Gunwant Raj & Ram Shankar	

== Reception ==
=== Box office ===
This is a list of Golapi franchise performance at box office.

Film	Release date	Budget	Box office	Ref.
Golapi Ekhon Traine	September 5, 1978	৳500k	৳1 crore	
Golapi Ekhon Dhakay	September 30, 1994	-	-	
Golapi Ekhon Bilatey	January 29, 2010	৳935k	-	
Total		৳0.14 crore(US$13k)	৳1 crore(US$93k)	
