= List of Bangladeshi film series =

A film series, movie series, or franchise is a collection of related films in succession that share the same fictional universe, or are marketed as a series. There are many sequels and prequels in the Bangladesh film industry. They may or may not share the same universe. The film series films that belong to the world of their predecessor or follow up the story are listed in Story-line followup / Character followup. The film series films that don't belong to the world of their predecessor are listed in common diegetic world. The franchise or film series is listed here by its first installment's release year. Only the film series or franchise with a minimum of 2 films are on this list.

== Bangladeshi film series or franchises ==
=== Story-line followup ===
Storyline followup film series or franchises
Film series	First installment released year	No. of films	Films	Director(s)	Ref.
Golapi	1978	3	Golapi Ekhon Traine, Golapi Ekhon Dhakay, Golapi Ekhon Bilatey	Amjad Hossain	
Agnee	2014	2	Agnee, Agnee 2	Iftakar Chowdhury.	
Mission Extreme	2021	2	Mission Extreme, Black War: Mission Extreme 2	Sunny Sanwar & Faisal Ahmed	
Raihan Rafi Cinematic Universe (RRCU)	2023	2	Surongo, Taandob	Raihan Rafi	
The Violence Universe	2025	2	Borbaad, Rakkhosh	Mehdi Hasan Hridoy	

=== Common diegetic world ===
Common diegetic world film series or franchises
Film series	First installment released year	No. of films	Films	Director(s)	Ref.
Nagin Universe	2000	3	Bishe Vora Nagin, Bishakto Nagin, Dui Nagin	Delwar Jahan Jhantu, MM Sarkar	
Shoshurbari Zindabad	2002	2	Shoshurbari Zindabad, Shoshurbari Zindabad 2	Debashish Biswas	
Monpura (franchise)	2009	3	Monpura, Swapnajaal, Paap Punno	Giasuddin Selim	
Most Welcome	2012	2	Most Welcome, Most Welcome 2	Anonno Mamun, Ananta Jalil	
Purno Doirgho Prem Kahini	2013	2	Purno Doirgho Prem Kahini, Purno Doirgho Prem Kahini 2	Shafi Uddin Shafi	
PoraMon	2013	2	PoraMon, PoraMon 2	Jakir Hossain Raju, Raihan Rafi	
Nabab	2017	2	Nabab, Nabab LLB	Joydip Mukherjee & Abdul Aziz, Anonno Mamun	
Jinn	2023	3	Jinn, Mona: Jinn 2, Jinn 3	Nader Chowdhury & Kamruzzaman Roman	

== Oldest Bangladeshi film series ==
This is a list of oldest Bangladeshi film series. The film series listed here are above 10 years old.

Oldest Bangladeshi film series
Film Series	First installment released year	First installment Director(s)	Years old
Golapi	1978	Amjad Hossain	44 years
Bishe Vora Nagin	2000	Delwar Jahan Jhantu	23 years
Shoshurbari Zindabad	2002	Debashish Biswas	21 years
Monpura (franchise)	2009	Giasuddin Selim	14 years
Most Welcome	2012	Anonno Mamun	10 years

== Longest running Bangladeshi film series ==
This is a list of longest running Bangladeshi film series. The film series will be listed by their years active.

Film series	Years active	Running years
Golapi	1978-2010	32 years
Shoshurbari Zindabad	2002-present	21 years
Monpura (franchise)	2009-2022	14 years
Jinn	2023-2025	2 years

== Upcoming film series ==
Film	Film series	Latest film
Taandob 2	RRCU	Taandob
Surongo 2	RRCU	Taandob
Untitled film with Siam Ahmed	RRCU	Taandob
Toofan 2	Toofan	Toofan
Upcoming Rakkhosh sequel	The Violence Universe	Rakkhosh
Prince 2	Prince	Prince: Once Upon a Time in Dhaka
Kill Him 2	Kill Him	Kill Him

== See also ==
- Cinema of Bangladesh
- List of highest-grossing Bangladeshi films
- List of Bangladeshi films
