= Golapi Ekhon Dhakay =

- Poster
- Directed by: Amjad Hossain
- Written by: Amjad Hossain
- Screenplay by: Amjad Hossain; Barun Shankar
- Starring: Babita; Ilias Kanchan; Champa; Anwara
- Cinematography: ZH Mintu
- Edited by: Mojibur Rahman Dulu
- Music by: Alauddin Ali
- Distributed by: Shukla Films
- Release date: 25 August 1994
- Running time: 122 minutes
- Country: Bangladesh
- Language: Bengali

Golapi Ekhon Dhakay is a 1994 Bangladeshi drama film written and directed by Amjad Hossain. It is sequel of 1978 film Golapi Ekhon Traine. It is second film of Amjad Hossain's Golapi series and the film was released 16 years after the first film. It stars Babita in the lead role as the title character alongside Ilias Kanchan, Champa, Anwara, Rawshan Jamil, Sadek Bachchu and others.

== Cast ==
- Babita as Golapi
- Ilias Kanchan as Oli
- Champa as Alapi
- Anwara as Moina
- Rawshan Jamil as Buri
- Sadek Bachchu as Lalu Sarder

== Release and reception ==
The 2 hour 2 minute film was released on 25 August 1994 in cinemas.

Written by Prothom Alo's survey as "It is the most popular film directed by Amjad Hossain".
