= Achen Amar Muktar =

1978 Dhallywood film song

- Gramophone vinyl album cover

Song by Alauddin Ali featuring Syed Abdul Hadi

from the album Golapi Ekhon Traine
- Language: Bengali
- English title: There Is My Attorney
- Released: September 5, 1978
- Recorded: 1978, Dhaka, Bangladesh
- Genre: Dhallywood; Sufi; Soul; soundtrack
- Length: 3:35
- Composer: Alauddin Ali
- Lyricist: Gazi Mazharul Anwar
- Producer: Alauddin Ali

Music video
- Achen Amar Muktar on YouTube

Achen Amar Muktar (Bengali: আছেন আমার মোক্তার, transl. There Is My Attorney) is a Bengali language song from the 1978 Bangladeshi film Golapi Ekhon Traine, which won numerous national awards including Best Film. The song was written by Gazi Mazharul Anwar, composed by Alauddin Ali and sung by Syed Abdul Hadi. Veteran actor Anwar Hossain performed with the song. The song gained popularity with the audience after release of the film.

== Release ==
The song was released as part of the soundtrack album of Golapi Ekhon Traine, which was released on September 5, 1978, by the music publisher sur jhonker through Gramophone vinyl record (number- SJ-221119).

The original song was so popular at that time, even after 38 years of release, in 2016 music director Kaushik Hossain Taposh re-released that song. Original singer Syed Abdul Hadi sung it this time also. Wind of change music show of Bangladeshi television Channel Gaan Bangla broadcast that song and received positive feedback, on 14 September 2016 this song was also published on YouTube.

== Accolades ==
Syed Abdul Hadi and Alauddin Ali received National Film Awards for this song in 1979. it was the first time for both recipients to receive a National Film Award.

Year	Awards	Nominated	Category	Result	Ref.
1979	National Film Awards	Syed Abdul Hadi	Best Male Playback Singer	Won	
1979	National Film Awards	Alauddin Ali	Best Music Director	Won	
