= Jonmo Theke Jolchi =

1981 Bangladeshi film

- Poster
- Directed by: Amjad Hossain
- Starring: Bulbul Ahmed; Bobita; Anwara; Prabir Mitra
- Music by: Alauddin Ali
- Release date: 1983
- Country: Bangladesh
- Language: Bengali

Jonmo Theke Jolchi (English: 'am Suffering from the Birth; Bengali: জন্ম থেকে জ্বলছি) is a 1981 Bangladeshi film starring Bulbul Ahmed, Bobita and Anwara. It received Bachsas Awards in 3 categories that year.

== Cast ==
- Bobita
- Bulbul Ahmed
- Anwara

== Music ==
It received 3 out of four musical awards in 1981 Bachsas Awards.

1. "Ekbar Jodi Keu Bhalobasto (male)" - Syed Abdul Hadi
2. "Ekbar Jodi Keu Bhalobasto (female)" - Samina Chowdhury
3. "Jonmo Theke Jolchi Mago" - Sabina Yasmin

== Awards ==
Bachsas Awards

- Best Music Direction - Alauddin Ali
- Best Male Playback Singer - Syed Abdul Hadi
- Best Female Playback Singer - Samina Chowdhury
