= Noyonmoni =

- Poster
- Directed by: Amjad Hossain
- Screenplay by: Amjad Hossain
- Produced by: AKM Jahangir Khan
- Starring: Bobita; Farooque; A.T.M. Shamsuzzaman; Rawshan Jamil; Anwar Hossain; Syed Hasan Imam
- Music by: Satya Saha
- Distributed by: Alamgir Pictures
- Release date: 25 June 1976
- Running time: 152 minutes
- Country: Bangladesh
- Language: Bengali

Noyonmoni (Bengali: নয়নমনি; English: Noyon and Moni) is a 1976 Bangladeshi film starring Farooque and Bobita opposite him. She garnered Bangladesh National Film Award for Best Actress for her performance in the film. It also stars Rowshan Jamil and Anwara.

== Cast ==
- Bobita – Moni
- Faruk (actor) – Noyon
- Anwar Hossain
- A.T.M. Shamsuzzaman
- Rowshan Jamil
- Syed Hasan Imam
- Anwara Begum

== Music ==
All songs were composed by Satya Saha with lyrics written by Gazi Mazharul Anwar.

1. "Chul Dhoirona Khopa Khule Jabe" - Sabina Yasmin
2. "Ami Kothay Thaki Re" - Sabina Yasmin, Syed Abdul Hadi
3. "Nani Go Nani" - Runa Laila

== Awards ==
Bangladesh National Film Awards

- Best Actress – Bobita
- Best Supporting Actress – Rowshan Jamil
- Best Screenplay – Amjad Hossain
