= Bheja Chokh =

Bangladeshi drama film

- Poster
- Bengali: ভেজা চোখ
- Directed by: Shibli Sadik
- Written by: Shibli Sadik
- Produced by: Shibli Sadik
- Starring: Ilias Kanchan; Champa; Mithun; Nipa Monalisa
- Release date: 1988
- Country: Bangladesh
- Language: Bengali

Bheja Chokh (Bengali: ভেজা চোখ) is a 1988 Bangladeshi drama film edited, written, and directed by Shibli Sadik. The film stars Ilias Kanchan and Champa in the lead roles.

== Plot ==
The story follows a young man named Jibon, who learns that he has a terminal illness but still tries to enjoy the rest of his life. The film focuses on the emotional struggle of his lover as she deals with his condition.

== Cast ==
- Ilias Kanchan as Jibon
- Mithun
- Champa
- Nipa Monalisa

== Music ==
=== Soundtrack ===
Track	Songs	Singer	Note
1	Priya amar priya, Jibon amar Jibon	Andrew Kishore	Runa Layla
2	Jiboner golpo achhe baki olpo	Andrew Kishore	
3	Tui To Kal chole Jabi Amake Chere	Andrew Kishore	Sheikh Ishtiaque.

== Awards ==
13th Bangladesh National Film Awards

- Best Child Artist (Special) - Baby Joya

== See also ==
- Rani Kuthir Baki Itihash
- Biyer Phul
