= Alif Alauddin =

Bangladeshi female singer

- আলিফ আলাউদ্দীন
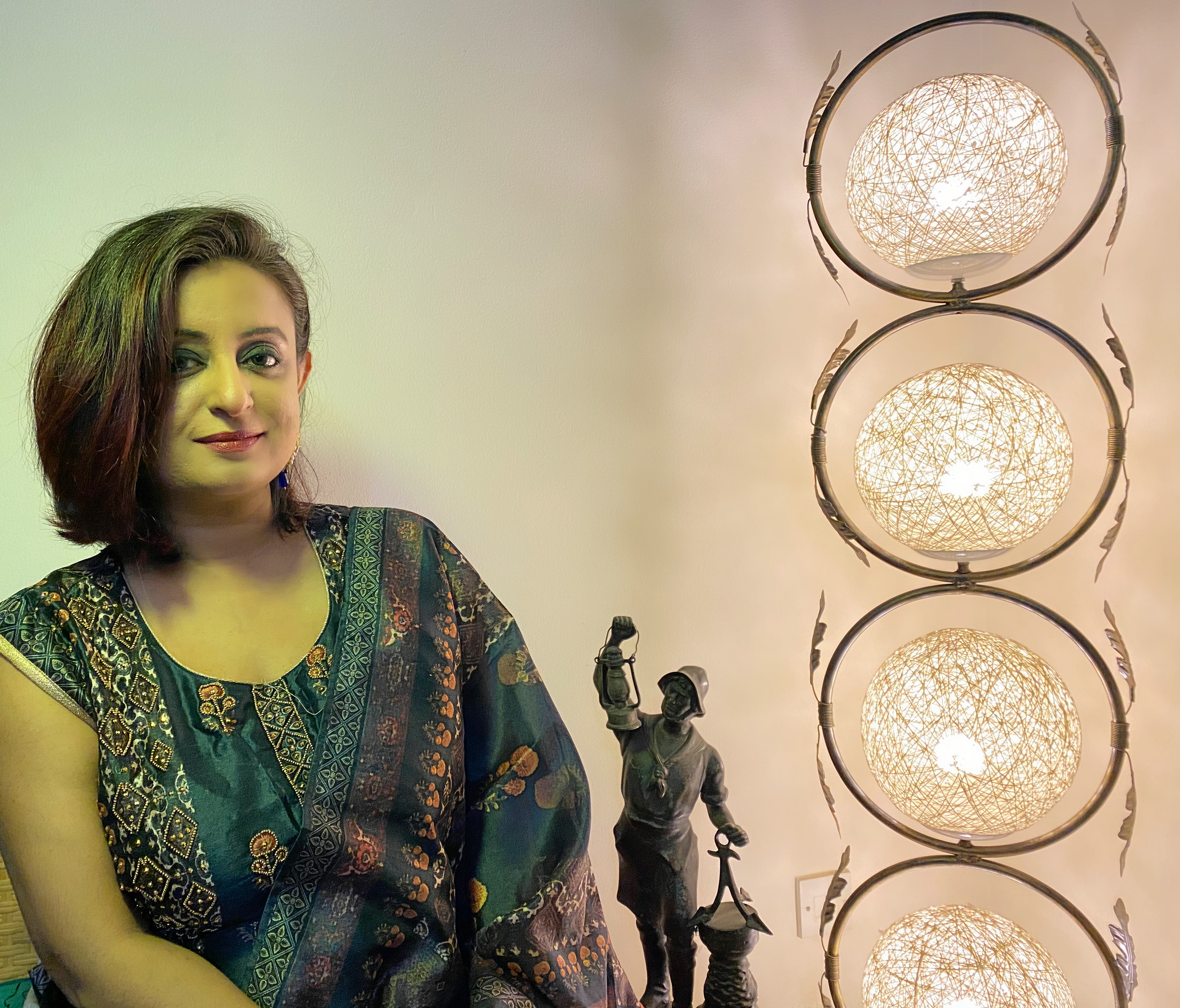
- Alauddin in 2020
- Born: 17 February 1983 (age 43)
- Occupations: singer, television presenter
- Years active: 1997–present
- Spouse: Kazi Faisal Ahmed (m. 2006)
- Children: 1

Alif Alauddin (born 17 February 1983) is a Bangladeshi singer and television presenter.

== Early life ==
Alauddin is the daughter of music director Alauddin Ali and singer Salma Sultana. Her maternal as well as paternal aunts and uncles, cousins are Abida Sultana, Rebeca Sultana, Rafiqul Alam, Sumon, Shouquat Ali Imon, Nawrin, Farshid, Pushpita, Ali Akbar Rupu, Abu Taher, Ali Akram Shubho, Dhir Ali Miah, Mansoor Ali. They are her immediate family members.

== Career ==
Alauddin started as a solo singer in 1997 and joined Pentagon in 2001. She has released solo albums, many singles and an album with Pentagon. She left Pentagon in 2009.

Alauddin and Pentagon bandmate who is also her cousin, Farshid Alam co-hosted Music Buzz on Ekattor TV starting in 2012. Broadcast twice weekly, it was soon the top-rated musical show on TV in the country, according to The Daily Star. It ran for twelve years. Alif Alauddin had a successful kidney transplant.

After a decade away from the band, she rejoined Pentagon in 2019.

Alauddin released her fourth solo self titled album in 2026.

== Personal life ==
Alauddin was diagnosed with polycystic kidney disease in 2010. She had a successful kidney transplant in 2023.

Alauddin married her band member from Pentagon, Kazi Faisal Ahmed on 14 July 2006. They have a daughter named Fiona. Alauddin's mother, Salma Sultana, died from kidney failure in September 2016.

Her father Alauddin Ali passed away on 9 August 2020 due to lung cancer.

== Discography ==
- Shei Tumi Ele (1998)
- Daake Amay (2006)
- Kolponate (2011)
- Alif Alauddin (2026)
