= Nargis Akhter (actress) =

Bangladeshi actress

- নারগিস আক্তার
- Born: Hosne Ara
- Occupation: Actress
- Relatives: Anwara Begum (sister); Rumana Islam Mukti (niece)

Hosne Ara (known by the stage name Nargis Akhter) is a Bangladeshi actress. She won the Bangladesh National Film Award for Best Supporting Actress for her performance in the film Maya: The Lost Mother (2019).

== Background ==
Akhter is a sister of actress Anwara Begum. She has another sister, Shamsunnahar, and a brother, Humayun Kabir (d. 2020). Hosne acted in her first theatre play Kuashar Kanna. In 1973, she changed her name to Nargis as she started acting in Khan Ataur Rahman produced film Jhorer Pakhi.

== Career ==
Akhter acted in several films including Abodan, Gunahgar, Champa Chameli, Bhai Aamar Bhai, Adalot, Nolok, Fakir Majnu Shah, Rong Berong, Sareng Bou, Mayar Badhon and Ramer Sumoti. She also performed in television series like Ayna, Hiramon and Bou Kotha Kou.
