= Farooque =

Bangladeshi actor and politician (1948–2023)

- ফারুক
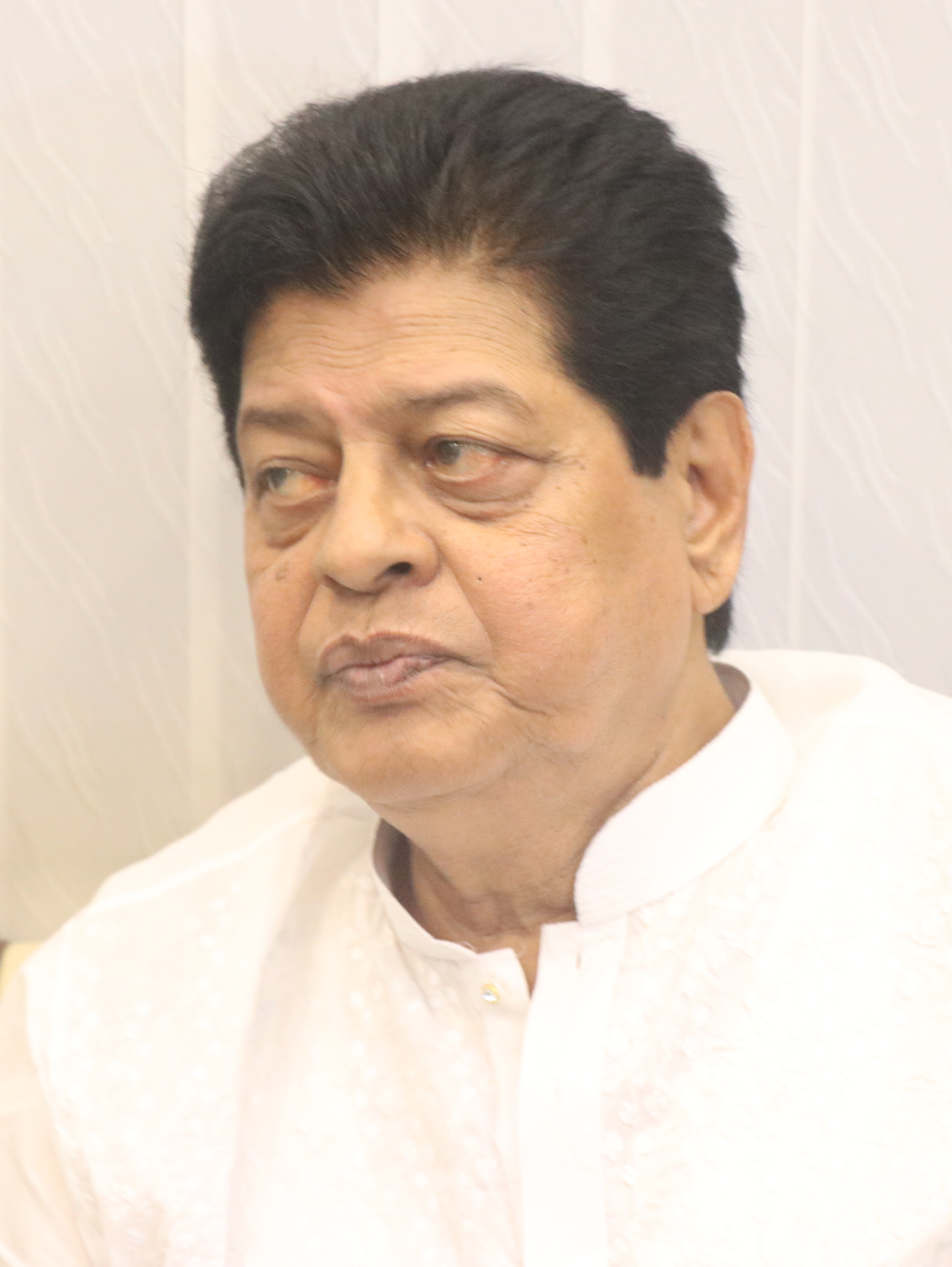
- Farooque in 2018

Member of Parliament
- In office 3 January 2019 – 15 May 2023
- Preceded by: SM Abul Kalam Azad
- Succeeded by: Mohammad A. Arafat
- Constituency: Dhaka-17

Personal details
- Born: Akbar Hossain Pathan; 18 August 1948 Dhaka, East Bengal, Dominion of Pakistan
- Died: 15 May 2023 (aged 74) Singapore
- Party: Bangladesh Awami League
- Spouse: Farhana Farooque
- Children: 2
- Occupation: Actor, politician
- Nickname(s): Mia Bhai, Dulu

Akbar Hossain Pathan Dulu (Bengali: আকবর হোসেন পাঠান দুলু; 18 August 1948 – 15 May 2023), known by the stage name Farooque (Bengali: ফারুক), was a Bangladeshi actor, politician, businessman and producer. He was known as 'Mia Bhai' (respected brother) to mass people. He appeared in over 150 films in a career spanning more than five decades. Most of his films were commercially and critically successful. Farooque was one of the most recognizable stars of the classical and golden era of Bangladeshi film industry.

Farooque was the first awardee of the Bangladesh National Film Award for Best Supporting Actor for the film Lathial in 1975 which he declined. In addition, he was awarded the Bangladesh National Film Award for Lifetime Achievement in 2016. As one of the most dominant actors in the Bangladeshi movie scene during the 1970s, 1980s and early 1990s, Farooque is widely considered one of the greatest and influential actors in the history of Bangladeshi cinema.

During Operation Searchlight, on 25 March 1971, he participated in the first resistance of the liberation war in Malitola, Old Dhaka as second in command of their own guerrilla force commanded by 'Nader Gunda'. Later, Farooque succeeded as commander and continued the fighting.

Farooque was a ruling Awami League member of Parliament (MP) for Dhaka-17 since 2018 Bangladeshi general election.

== Early life ==
Akbar Hossain Pathan was born on 18 August 1948 to the Bengali Muslim Pathan family in Kaliganj, Gazipur, then a part of Dacca district, East Bengal. Farooque was born on 18 August 1948, His father, Azgar Hossain Pathan, was a medical doctor. He spent most of his childhood in Old Dhaka.

Farooque was associated with the politics in six point movement in 1966. 37 cases were filed against him by Pakistani military junta for participating in the movement.

Farooque participated in the 1971 Liberation War. In liberation war, he was closely associated with and fought alongside guerrilla legend 'Nader Gunda' as second in command. During Operation Searchlight, 25 March 1971, he participated in the very first resistance of the liberation war in Malitola as second in command of their own guerrilla force commanded by 'Nader Gunda'. After killing of 'Nader Gunda' by Pakistani forces, Farooque succeeded as commander and continued the fighting.

== Career ==
Farooque started his film career through Jolchobi in 1971. The award-winning actor has contributed enormously to shape the Golden Era of the Bangladeshi film industry. Golapi Ekhon Traine, Lathial, Abar Tora Manush Ho, Mia Bhai, Sareng Bou, Padma Meghna Jamuna, Ekhono Onek Raat; the list of his milestone works continued to adorn his career. Though he shared screen with every leading actress of his time, most of Farooque's works were associated with the actresses Bobita, Rozina and Kabori.

Most of his films were in village settings, though he is recognized as a versatile actor. He established himself as the most popular protagonist in village setting films. Most of his films were massive hits.

Farooque produced more than a dozen of films through his production company FP Films. Farooque was one of the founders of Film Artist Association and incumbent president of Bangobandhu Sangskritik Jot.

Farooque was also a businessman except his acting career. He was the managing director of Farooque Kniting and Dying Manufacturing Company situated in Kaliakoir, Gazipur.

As a political activist, Farooque was associated with Bangladesh Awami League politics since 1966. He was elected to the parliament from Dhaka-17 constituency as a candidate of Bangladesh Awami League on 30 December 2018.

== Personal life and death ==
Farooque was married to Farhana Farooque. They had a daughter, Fariha Tabassum Hossain, and a son, Rowshon Hossain.

In September 2020, Farooque tested positive for tuberculosis, and was admitted to Mount Elizabeth Hospital in Singapore. Earlier, on 16 August 2020, he was admitted to a private hospital due to fever. After, he was in intensive care unit (ICU) for 4 months. In January 2022, it was revealed that two flats of his, priced at 15 crore taka, were sold. He died in Singapore on 15 May 2023, at the age of 74.

== Filmography ==
Year	Film	Director	Role	Notes
1971	Jolchhobi	H. Akbar		Debut film released on 22 March 1971
1973	Duronto Durbar	Mohiuddin		
1973	Abar Tora Manush Ho	Khan Ataur Rahman		
1974	Choker Jole	Aziz Azhar		
1974	Alor Michil	Narayan Ghosh Mita	Rashed	
1974	Trirotno	Khan Ataur Rahman		
1975	Lathial	Narayan Ghosh Mita	Dukhu Mia	Won Bangladesh National Film Award for Best Supporting Actor
1975	Sujon Sokhi	Chashi Nazrul Islam	Sujon	
1976	Noyonmoni	Amjad Hossain	Noyon	
1976	Matir Maya	Taher Chowdhury		
1976	Surjogrohon	Rosy Samad		
1977	Trishna	Narayan Ghosh Mita		
1978	Sareng Bou	Abdullah Al Mamun	Kodom Sareng	Based on the novel of Shahidullah Kaiser by the same title
1978	Golapi Ekhon Traine	Amjad Hossain	Milon	Based on the novel of Amjad Hossain titled Droupodi Ekhon Traine
1979	Ghor Jamai	Zahirul Haque		
1979	Din Jay Kotha Thake	Khan Ataur Rahman		
1979	Noder Chand	Sheikh Nazrul Islam		
1979	Surjo Songram	Rosy Samad		
1979	Chokher Moni	Narayan Ghosh Mita		
1979	Priyo Bandhobi	Motaher Hossain		
1979	Modhumoti	Hasmot		
1979	Choto Ma	Tamij Uddin Rizvi		
1979	Shohor Theke Dure	Dilip Shom		
1979	Nagordola	Belal Ahmed		
1980	Sokhi Tumi Kar	Abdullah Al Mamun		
1980	Kotha Dilam	Akbar Kabir Pintu		
1980	Etim	Sheikh Nazrul Islam		
1980	Jibon Mrityu	Narayan Ghosh Mita		
1980	Bhai Bhai	Swapan Saha		
1980	Chokka Panja	Nur Hossain Bolai		
1980	Dosti	Ajmal Huda Mithu		
1980	Protigya	A J Mintu		
1981	Sonar Tori	Azizur Rahman		
1981	Sukher Songsar	Narayan Ghosh Mita		
1981	Masum	Sheikh Nazrul Islam		
1981	Matir Putul	Abdus Samad Khokon		
1981	Janata Express	Azizur Rahman		
1982	Reshmi Churi	Shibly Sadik		
1982	Taser Ghor	Narayan Ghosh Mita		
1982	Laal Kajol	Motin Rahman		
1982	Chitkar	Motin Rahman		
1982	Jontor Montor	Azizur Rahman		
1983	Sikandar	Nur Hossain Bolai		
1983	Shimar	H. Akbar		
1983	Ijjat	Swapan Saha		
1983	Asha	Sheikh Nazrul Islam		
1983	Arshinagar	Khan Ataur Rahman		
1983	Chena Mukh	Zahirul Haque		
1983	Mehmaan	Azizur Rahman		
1983	Ondho Bodhu	Subhash Dutt		
1983	Hashu Amar Hashu	H. Akbar		
1984	Punomilon	Ebne Mizan		
1984	Matsya Kumari	Kazi Kamal		
1984	Maan Obhimaan	Narayan Ghosh Mita		
1984	Mayer Achol	Azizur Rahman		
1985	Phooleshwari	Azizur Rahman		
1985	Shaheb	Narayan Ghosh Mita		
1985	Jhinuk Mala	Rosy Samad		
1985	Poristhan	Md. Shahjahan Akand		
1986	Sud Asal	Narayan Ghosh Mita		
1987	Obishwas	Swapan Saha		
1988	Moshal	Badrul Alam		
1988	Kartabya	Swapan Saha		
1988	Jadu Mahal	Swapan Saha		
1988	Sukher Shopno	Awkat Hossain		
1988	Shaktishali	Swapan Saha		
1988	Behula Lakindar	Chashi Nazrul Islam		
1989	Bhool Bichar	Anjan Sarker		
1989	Biraj Bou	Mohiuddin Faruqe		
1989	Laila Amar Laila	M. A. Malek		
1989	Kala Khoon	Darashikho		
1989	Adarshaban	Abu Musa Debu		
1989	Alal Dulal	Ebne Mizan		
1990	Shimul Parul	Delwar Jahan Jhantu	Shimul	
1990	Jobab Chai	Mujibor Rahman		
1990	Shesh Porichoy	Anjan Sarker		
1990	Lakhe Ekta	Kazi Kamal		
1990	Palki	Delwar Jahan Jhantu		
1990	Kismat	Humayun Kabir		
1990	Mia Bhai	Chashi Nazrul Islam		
1990	Dukhini Ma	Delwar Jahan Jhantu		
1991	Bhai Bhabi	Delwar Jahan Jhantu		
1991	Surjo Sontan	Ayat Ali Patwari		
1991	Lottery	Abdul Latif Bacchu		
1991	Padma Meghna Jamuna	Chashi Nazrul Islam	Hashu	
1992	Khomotaban	Fazle Ahmed Benzir		
1992	Bod Nosib	Sheikh Alauddin		
1992	Bondhu Amar	Awkat Hossain		
1993	Danga Fyasad	Chashi Nazrul Islam		
1993	Chorom Protishod	Sujaur Rahman		
1996	Jibon Songshar	Jakir Hossain Raju	Sagar Ahmed	
1997	Jibon Mane Juddho	Mostafizur Rahman Babu		
1998	Prithibi Tomar Amar	Badal Khandaker		
1998	E Jibon Tomar Amar	Jakir Hossain Raju		
1998	Ekhono Onek Raat	Khan Ataur Rahman	Zahed	
1998	Manush Manusher Jonno	Maruf Hossain Milton		
2001	Mone Rekho Amay	Awlad Hossain & Nasir Uddin		
2006	Koti Takar Kabin	F I Manik	Mannab Talukder	
2008	Ghorer Lokkhi	Azadi Hasnat Firoz		Last film

== Awards ==
- Bangladesh National Film Award for Best Supporting Actor (1975)
- Bachsas Awards
- Bangladesh National Film Award for Lifetime Achievement
