= Door-Desh =

1983 film directed by Ambrish Sangal

Gehri Chot- Urf: Durdesh
- Directed by: Ambrish Sangal
- Written by: Suraj Sanim
- Produced by: Jagdish Bahroos; Ashok "Charlie" Mehra; Shamim Ahmed
- Starring: Shashi Kapoor; Sharmila Tagore; Raj Babbar; Parveen Babi; David Abraham; Nadeem Baig; Bobita
- Cinematography: K. K. Mahajan
- Edited by: Govind Dalwadi
- Music by: Usha Khanna
- Production company: Friends Films International
- Release date: 31 March 1983
- Running time: 140 minuntes
- Countries: Canada; India
- Language: Hindi

Gehri Chot, also released as Door-Desh, is a 1983 Indian-Canadian Hindi-language crime-drama film directed by Ambrish Sangal, starring Shashi Kapoor and Sharmila Tagore in the lead roles with Raj Babbar, Parveen Babi, David Abraham, Nadeem Baig, and Bobita in supporting roles. This was both Pakistani actor Nadeem and Bangladeshi actress Bobita's only appearance in a Bollywood film. This was also the last time veteran actor David Abraham appeared in a movie, filmed shortly before his death in 1982.

Much of the film was shot in Toronto, Canada. It was later dubbed into Bengali in Bangladesh.

== Plot ==
Arun Khanna (Shashi Kapoor) is an NRI from Toronto, Canada who marries a traditional Indian woman Shobha (Sharmila Tagore). They have a son named Raju (Raj Babbar) and a daughter named Pinky (Bobita). Shobha finds it difficult to fit into the Western lifestyle in Canada and eventually separates from Arun after suspecting him of an affair with his secretary. Shobha decides to take her son Raju back with her to India while Arun stays in Canada with his daughter Pinky. 20 years pass by and the family is reunited when Pinky is kidnapped by some gangsters led by psychopathic killer Tony (Nadeem Baig). Tony develops an obsession with Pinky and falls in love with her. Pinky initially resists him but eventually she too falls in love with him. Raju is brought to Canada by his mother Shobha, unaware of Arun being his father. He is told by Shobha that Arun is an old family friend who needs help finding his daughter. Raju enlists the help of Renu (Parveen Babi) to help find the gang who kidnapped Pinky. Raju soon discovers Arun is actually his father and Pinky is his sister. Raju is contacted by the kidnappers and hands over the ransom money to Tony. Tony's boss (David Abraham) realising that Tony is getting too close to Pinky decides to have Pinky killed. Tony intervenes and kills his boss and runs away with Pinky. Tony and Pinky hide out at a cottage and his boss's henchman find them and surround them, armed with guns. Raju and his family also arrive and fight off the henchmen. Pinky sees her father and runs out, while a shootout is ensuing between Tony and the henchmen. Tony runs out to save Pinky from the gunfire and is shot several times by the henchmen. Raju and Renu kill the goons and Pinky admits she loves Tony before he dies. In the end, Pinky reunites with her father, mother and brother.

== Cast ==
- Shashi Kapoor as Arun Khanna
- Sharmila Tagore as Shobha
- Raj Babbar as Raju
- Parveen Babi as Renu
- Nadeem Baig as Tony
- Bobita as Pinky
- David Abraham as the head of a kidnapping gang

== Music ==
The music was composed by Usha Khanna (and Kamal Joshi) and featured the following songs: All lyrics are written by Indeevar.

- "Yaaron Mere Yaar Se Milo" - Asha Bhosle, picturised on Parveen Babi
- "Aap To Aise Na The" - Lata Mangeshkar & Yesudas, picturised on Parveen Babi & Raj Babbar
- "Dushmani Na Karo Sanam" - Lata Mangeshkar, picturised on Nadeem Baig & Bobita
- "Ruk Jaa Saathi" (Male) - Anwar, picturised on Shashi Kapoor & Sharmila Tagore
- "Ruk Jaa Saathi" (Female) - Lata Mangeshkar, picturised on Shashi Kapoor and Sharmila Tagore

In the Bengali dub, the music was composed by Golam Hossain Litu.

- "Tumi Amare Bhalobaso" - Sabina Yasmin and Syed Abdul Hadi ("Aap To Aise Na The")
- "Dushmoni Korona Priyotomo" - Sabina Yasmin ("Dushmani Na Karo Sanam")
- "Jeona Saathi" - Sabina Yasmin and Syed Abdul Hadi (male and female versions of "Ruk Jaa Saathi")

== Reception ==
=== Critical reception ===
Gautam Chintamani from Firstpost wrote that "Gehri Chot failed to sow the seeds of the poignancy that the films of Mira Nair and, to some extent, Deepa Mehta, displayed when it came to the diaspora".
