= Bosundhora =

1977 Bangladeshi film

- Directed by: Subhash Dutta
- Screenplay by: Subhash Dutta
- Based on: Teish Nambor Toilochitra by Alauddin Al Azad
- Produced by: Subhash Dutta
- Starring: Bobita; Ilias Kanchan; Sharmili; Hasan Imam
- Music by: Satya Saha
- Distributed by: Anis Film Corporation
- Release date: 11 November 1977 (Bangladesh)
- Country: Bangladesh
- Language: Bengali

Bosundhora (Bengali: বসুন্ধরা; lit. Bashundhara) is a 1977 Bangladeshi Bengali-language film directed by Subhash Dutta. The film was based on the Alauddin Al Azad novel Teish Nambor Toilochitra. The film was produced by Bangladesh Liberation War Welfare Trust. Filming began on 6 March 1977. The film stars Bobita and Ilias Kanchan in the leading roles with Sharmili Ahmed, Syed Hasan Imam, Timur, Nuton, Akram, Soleman, Kabira, Sushoma, and Mondira in supporting roles. In 1977, the film won the Bangladesh National Film Award for Best Film along with five other categories.

== Cast ==
- Bobita - Chobi
- Ilias Kanchan - Zahed
- Sharmili Ahmed
- Syed Hasan Imam
- Timur
- Nuton
- Akram
- Soleman
- Kabira
- Sushoma
- Mondira

== Music ==
The film song was directed by renowned music composer and music director Satya Saha. The song was composed by Syed Shamsul Haque.

- "Rongdhonu Chhoriye Chetonar Akashe" - Sabina Yasmin

== Awards ==
National Film Awards

- Won: Best Films - Subhash Dutta (Producer)
- Won: Best Director - Subhash Dutta
- Won: Best Actress - Bobita
- Won: Best Supporting Actor - Syed Hasan Imam
- Won: Best Storyteller - Alauddin Al Azad
- Won: Best Art Editor - Mohiuddin Farooq

== International Film Festival ==
- International Film Festival - 1978
