= Anaya Abichar =

1985 film

Anyay Abichar
- Poster
- Directed by: Shakti Samanta
- Written by: Shaktipada Rajguru
- Produced by: Shakti Samanta
- Starring: Rozina; Mithun Chakraborty; Utpal Dutt
- Cinematography: Nando Bhattacharya
- Edited by: Bijoy Choudhury
- Music by: R D Burman
- Release dates: 18 October 1985 (Bengali); 22 November 1985 (Hindi)
- Running time: 130 minutes
- Countries: India; Bangladesh
- Languages: Hindi; Bengali

Anyay Abichar (Bengali pronunciation: [ɔnːae̯ ɔbitʃar]; transl. Injustice and unfairness) or Aar Paar (Hindi pronunciation: [aːɾ paːɾ]; transl. This or That) is a 1985 Indo-Bangladesh joint venture bilingual action film co-written and directed by Shakti Samanta, under the banner of Shakti Films. Simultaneously shot in Bengali and Hindi languages, the film is co-produced by Syed Hassan Imam under the banner of Chitrangan. Based on Shaktipada Rajguru's story Jowar Bhata, the film stars Mithun Chakraborty, Rozina and Utpal Dutt in lead roles.

== Plot ==
Ghanashyam, also known as Ghana, is an honest fisherman who works with a group of people. He owes Mahesh Manna (also known as Mahesh Babu) money for a loan he took out to buy his boat.

Mahesh Manna is dishonest, cheating Ghana and the others by underweighting their catch, among other things. He also lusts after Ghana's love interest, Kamli.

As Ghana's problems mount and Mahesh Babu's plans to exploit them unravel, the situation culminates in a final confrontation that not even the corrupt local police officer Asit Sen can prevent.

== Cast ==
- Mithun Chakraborty as Ghansham alias Ghaniya
- Utpal Dutt as Mahesh Babu
- Tarun Ghosh as Padla
- Hasan Imam
- Deepa Sahi
- Asit Sen
- Maya Ghosh
- A.T.M. Shamsuzzaman
- Golam Mustafa
- Ahmed Sharif
- Manik Dutt as Jatin
- Rozina as Kamli
- Nuton as Pannabai

== Soundtrack ==
All songs were written by Gauriprasanna Mazumdar and composed by R. D. Burman.

Song listing
No.	Title	Singer	Length
1.	"Chhero Na Chhero Na Haath"	Kishore Kumar, Sabina Yasmin	4:55
2.	"Dekhle Kemon Tumi Khel"	Kishore Kumar	6:05
3.	"Rui Katla Ilish Bhebe"	Sabina Yasmin	4:56
4.	"Nagor Amar Kancha Peerit"	Asha Bhosle, Shailendra Singh	4:42
5.	"Mon Majhi Re"	R. D. Burman	6:20
6.	"Rui Katla Ilish To Noy"	Kishore Kumar	5:01
7.	"Ore Sujan Naiya"	R. D. Burman	2:17
Total length:			34:17

=== Hindi version ===
Lyrics: Anand Bakshi

1. "Kaunse Dariya, Kaunse Nadiya Ki Tu Rehane Waali" – Kishore Kumar
2. "Jaiyo Na Jaiyo Na Door Humre Jiya Me Rahiyo" – Kishore Kumar, Sabina Yasmin
3. "Gali Gali Shor Hai, Sethiya Chor" – Kishore Kumar
4. "Kaunse Dariya, Kaunse Nadiya Ka Tu Rehane Waala" – Sabina Yasmin
5. "O Maajhi Teri Naiyaan Se Chhuta Kinaara" – R D Burman
6. "Mera Naam Pannabai Patnewali" – Shailendra Singh, Asha Bhosle

== Bengali voice track version ==
The film was also released on 18 October 1985 with a Bengali-language voice track as Anyay Abichar.
