= Jashim =

Bangladeshi film actor

- জসিম
- Born: Abul Khair Jashim Uddin; 14 August 1945; Dhaka, Bengal Province, British India
- Died: 8 October 1998 (aged 53); Dhaka, Bangladesh
- Occupations: Actor, film producer, action director
- Years active: 1976–1998
- Spouses: Sucharita (divorced); Nasrin
- Children: 3

Abul Khayer Jashim Uddin (14 August 1945 – 8 October 1998) known professionally as Jashim, was a Bangladeshi film actor, producer, action director and freedom fighter. He acted in more than 200 films.

== Early life and career ==
Jashim was born at Boxnagar village in Nawabganj Upazila, Dhaka on 14 August 1945. He was a freedom fighter who fought in the Liberation War of Bangladesh in 1971 at sector 2 under Major ATM Haider.

Jashim debuted his acting career through the film Debor in 1972 but Rangbaz (1973) film was released before the film Debor. He went to act in Raj Dulari, Tufan, Jobab, Nag Nagini, Bodla, Barud, Sundori, Koshai, Lalu Mastan, Nababjada and Meyerao Manush. He debuted as a lead actor in the film Shobuj Shathi, directed by Delowar Jahan Jhontu. He went on to act in the films Poribar, Buker Dhon, Shami Keno Ashami, Lal Golap, Tiger and Habildar.

== Personal life ==
Jashim's first wife was film actress Sucharita and later he married Nasrin, the daughter of actress Purnima Sengupta. AK Ratul, AK Rahul and AK Samee are the sons of Jashim.

== Death ==
Jashim died from a brain hemorrhage on 8 October 1998.

== Filmography ==
- Barud
- Bhai Amar Bhai
- Bhorosha
- Buker Dhon
- Chiroshotru
- Dui Rongbaz
- Gaddar
- Habilder
- Hero
- Kuwasha
- Laatshaheb
- Lal Golap
- Love in Singapore
- Manshonman
- Mastan Raja
- Nishartho
- Poradhin
- Poribar
- Prem Lorai
- Rajababu
- Shami Keno Ashami
- Shamir Adesh
- Shotruta
- Bhalobashar Ghor (1997)
- Tiger (1997)
- Meyerao Manush (1998)
- Jore (1999)
- Halchal

Year	Film	Role	Notes	Ref.
1973	Rangbaz	Jashim	Debut film	
1973	Debor	Khayer Ali		
1973	Rater Por Din	Jashim		
1973	Apobad			
1974	Jehad	Abul		
1974	Takar Khela	Ali		
1974	Masud Rana			
1974	Bichar	Jashim		
1974	Gopal Bhar	Gopal		
1974	Daku Monsur	Daku Monsur		
1974	Antorale	Hira		
1974	Bhaibon	Kawsar		
1974	Mama Bhagne	Jamil		
1974	Jighangsha	Junga Daku		
1975	Epar Opar			
1976	Ek Muthi Bhat			
1976	The Rain			
1976	Kajol Rekha			
1976	Bahadur			
1977	Dost Dushmon	Gaffar Khan		
1977	Nishan			
1978	Raj Dulari			
1978	Tufan			
1978	Mohesh Khalir Baake			
1979	Jobab			
1979	Badla	Rahat Chowdhury		
1979	Sundori	Iman Ali		
1980	Mokabela		Debut in as lead role	
1980	Omar Sharif			
1980	Protiggya			
1980	Koshai			
1981	Nababjadi			
1981	Selim Javed	Javed		
1982	Shobuj Sathi			
1982	Juboraaj	Shehzadah Parvez Shah		
1982	Al Helal	Omar		
1983	Laili Mojnu			
1983	Protihingsha			
1983	Nagrani			
1983	Nazma			
1984	CID			
1984	Abhijan			
1986	Muhammad Ali			
1986	Akrosh			
1986	Nishpaap			
1987	Surrender			
1987	Lalu Mastan			
1989	Bhaijan			
1989	Nag Nagini			
1991	Rokter Bodla			
1991	Kajer Beti Rohima			
1992	Lokkhir Sangsar			
1992	Shanti Oshanti	Hira		
1993	Hingsha			
1994	Kalia			
1994	Dakat	Ajad / Badal	Dual role	
1995	Banglar Nayok			
1996	Gariber Sansar	Jaman		
1996	Ghat Protighat			
1996	Goriber Ostad			
1996	Nishthur			
1998	Dui Rangbaz			
1999	Jiddi		Posthumous release	
