= Gauhar Jamil =

- গওহর জামিল
- Born: Ganesh Nath c. 1925; Sirajdikhan village, Bikrampur, Bengal Presidency, British India
- Died: 21 September 1980 (aged 54–55)
- Spouse: Rawshan Jamil (m. 1952)

Gauhar Jamil (born Ganesh Nath; c. 1925 – 21 September 1980) was a Bangladeshi dancer.

== Career ==
Jamil took dance lessons from Uday Shankar, Sharbashree Maruthappa Pillai, Bal Keshta Menon, Ramnarayan Mitra, and Bhaskar Dev.

Jamil taught dance lessons at Shilapakala Bhavan, Bulbul Lalitakala Academy, and Qamrunnessa School. Jamil married Rawshan Jamil in 1952. In 1959 they founded a dance school Jago Art Centre.
