= Abar Tora Manush Ho =

- Film poster
- Directed by: Khan Ataur Rahman
- Screenplay by: Khan Ataur Rahman
- Based on: Amjad Hossain
- Starring: Maruf Ahmed; Farooque; Raisul Islam Asad; Bobita
- Music by: Khan Ataur Rahman
- Release date: 1973
- Country: Bangladesh
- Language: Bengali

Abar Tora Manush Ho (Bengali: আবার তোরা মানুষ হ) is a 1973 Bangladeshi film starring Maruf Ahmed, Bobita, Farooque and Raisul Islam Asad. Khan Ataur Rahman earned both Best Film and Best Director Award at Bangladesh National Film Awards.

== Music ==
- "Kiser Shok Koris Bhai" - N/A
- "Tumi Cheyechile Ogo Jante" - Abida Sultana
- "Ek Nodi Rokto Periye" - Shahnaz Rahmatullah

== Awards ==
Bangladesh National Film Awards

- Best Film - Khan Ataur Rahman
- Best Director - khan Ataur Rahman

Bachsas Awards

- Best Screenplay - Khan Ataur Rahman
