= Rumana Islam Mukti =

Bangladeshi actress

- রুমানা ইসলাম মুক্তি
- Other names: Shagorika (Family Nickname)
- Occupation: Actress
- Years active: 1992–2016
- Known for: Padma Nadir Majhi, Srabon Megher Din, Hason Raja
- Children: Karima Darodi
- Mother: Anwara Begum

Rumana Islam Mukti is a Bangladeshi actress. As a child, she played roles in films Chander Alo (1992) and Padma Nadir Majhi (1993). Several years later she took a supporting role in Srabon Megher Din (1999), before starring in Hason Raja (2002).

She is the daughter of Freedom Fighter Mr. Muhitul Islam and actress Anwara Begum. Mukti made her film debut while a sixth grade student of Viqarunnisa Noon School and College. Her first role was in the film Padma Nadir Majhi, released in 1993, although the second film in which she performed, Chander Alo, was released first, in 1992.

== Filmography ==
| Year | Title | Role | Ref. |
|---|---|---|---|
| 1992 | Chander Alo | | |
| 1992 | Padma Nadir Majhi | Gopi, Kuber's daughter | |
| | Larai Yuddha | | |
| 1999 | Srabon Megher Din | | |
| 2002 | Hason Raja | | |
| | Tumi Amar Swami | | |
| | Pita Matar Amanat | | |
| 2010 | Jogot Songsar | | |
| 2010 | Rikshawalar Chele | | |
| | Darowaner Chele | | |
| † | A Desh Tomar Amar | | |
| † | Leela Manthan | | |

Key
| † | Denotes films that have not yet been released |
