= Jago Art Center =

Dance training center in Bangladesh

Jago Art Center is the oldest dance training center and organization in Bangladesh. It was established in 1959 by Gawhar Jamil. Since its inception, Jago Art Center has made significant contributions to the dance industry in Bangladesh. The Jago Art Center works in both dance education and performance. They have sub-centers in the United States. Dance is performed internationally through this sub-center. In Dhaka, the institute is known as a dance training center.

== Description ==
The Maryland, US, branch of Jago Art Center staged the dance drama "Rainbow in a Heart" on January 6, 2012, at the National Theater Hall of Bangladesh Shilpakala Academy. Rosemary Mitu Gonsalves, a student of Gauhar Jamil, opened in the United States in 2003 as part of an organization founded by renowned dance master Gowher Jamil of Bangladesh.

== Management ==
Music director Mir Kashem Khan was the founding principal. Later, Gawhar Jamil himself acted as its principal. Gowher Jamil, the founder of the center, married dancer and actress Rahshan Jamil in 1952 and converted to Islam. After his death, she ran the center until her death in 2002.

== Significant dance ==
- Anarkali
- Omar Khayyam
- Hafiz's dream
- Mother's release
- Slight damage
- The heart of a Bengali woman
- Question
