= Koshai =

Bangladeshi film

- Poster
- Directed by: Amjad Hossain
- Produced by: Amjad Hossain
- Starring: Alamgir; Rozina; Jashim; Kabari
- Music by: Alauddin Ali, Adhyan Dhara
- Release date: 1980
- Country: Bangladesh
- Language: Bengali

Koshai (Bengali: কসাই, transl. "butcher") is a 1980 Bangladeshi film directed by Amjad Hossain. It stars Rozina, Bobita, Alamgir, Kabari, and Jashim. It won four National Film Awards: Best Supporting Actress (Rozina), Best Music Director (Alauddin Ali), Best Male Playback Singer (Syed Abdul Hadi), and Best Female Playback Singer (Sabina Yasmin).

== Cast ==
- Bobita
- Kabari
- Rozina
- Jashim
- Alamgir

== Music ==
- "Bondhu Tin Din" - Runa Laila
- "Amar Doshe Doshi Ami" - Syed Abdul Hadi

== Release and reception ==
The film was screened at the 1980 Moscow International Film Festival.

Writing in 2002, Critic Zakir Hossain Raju described Koshai as one of the films of the period that, "bubble with social criticism and satire, which were virtually non-existent earlier".

== Awards ==
Bangladesh National Film Awards 1980

- Best Supporting Actress - Rozina
- Best Music Director - Alauddin Ali
- Best Male Playback Singer - Syed Abdul Hadi
- Best Female Playback Singer - Sabina Yasmin
