= Dhir Ali Miah =

Bangladeshi music composer(1920-1984)

- ধীর আলী মিয়া
- Born: 1 January 1920; Munshiganj District, Bengal Presidency, British India
- Died: 14 December 1984 (aged 64); Dhaka, Bangladesh
- Children: Abu Taher; Ali Akram Shuvo

Dhir Ali Miah (1 January 1920 – 14 December 1984) was a Bangladeshi flute player, composer, director and orchestra conductor. He was awarded Tamgha-e-Imtiaz (1965) by the government of Pakistan and Ekushey Padak (1986) by the government of Bangladesh.

== Family background ==
Dhir Ali Miah was born on 1 January 1920 in Bashbari village, Tongibari, Munshiganj District in the then Bengal Presidency, British India. His father, Ustad Sher Ali Miah, was the first Bengali Muslim instrumentalist. Dhir's uncles Ustad Zadab Ali and Ustad Sadek Ali were notable instrumentalists too. His younger brother Ali Hossain and cousin Alauddin Ali were notable music directors of the Bangladesh film industry.

== Education and career ==
Miah studied in Sonarang High School. He took lessons to play flute from his uncle musician Sadeq Ali. He joined the Dhaka station of Radio Pakistan as a staff artist in 1948. He retired in 1983 as the deputy chief music producer.

Miah worked as assistant music director of the first Bengali language full-length film Mukh O Mukhosh. Later he directed music of films like Nachghar, Ujala, Joyar Elo, Kavchanmala, Abar Banabase Rupbhan, Dasyurani, and Kajalrekha.

== Personal life ==
Miah sons Abu Taher (1954–1999) and Ali Akram Shuvo were also involved in music composition and direction.
