= Champa (actress) =

Bangladeshi actress

- চম্পা
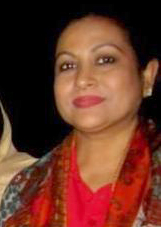
- Champa (2014)
- Born: Gulshan Ara Akter Champa; 5 January 1965 (age 61)
- Occupations: Actress, model
- Years active: 1981–present
- Spouse: Shahidul Islam Khan (m. 1982)
- Children: Esha Ahmed
- Parents: ASM Nizamuddin Ayub (father); Jahan Ara Begum (mother)
- Relatives: Shuchanda (sister); Bobita (sister)
- Awards: National Film Awards

Gulshan Ara Akter Champa (born 5 January 1965) is a Bangladeshi film and television actress. She won Bangladesh National Film Award for Best Actress three times for the films Padma Nadir Majhi (1992), Anya Jibon (1995) and Uttarer Khep (2000), and the Best Supporting Actress award for Shasti (2005) and Chandragrohon (2008). As of January 2019, she has acted over 200 films.

== Early life ==
Gulshan Ara Akter was born on 5 January 1965 to ASM Nizamuddin Ayub and Jahan Ara Begum (d. 1975). Champa is the younger sister of actresses Babita and Shuchanda.

== Career ==
=== Television ===
Champa started her career in 1981 with the BTV drama Dub Satar, directed by Abdullah Al Mamun. She soon received offers for other dramatic roles, and appeared in Sahabjadir Kalo Nekab, Akash Bariye Dao, Khola Daroja, Ekti Joddo Anno Ekti Meye, Apoya, Ekhane Nongor, and others.

=== Film ===
Champa debuted in acting with the film Tin Kanya (1986), directed by Shibli Sadik. This film was produced by her sister Shuchanda, and all three sisters - Shucanda, Babita, and Champa, performed in the film. Champa played the role of a police inspector.

== Personal life ==
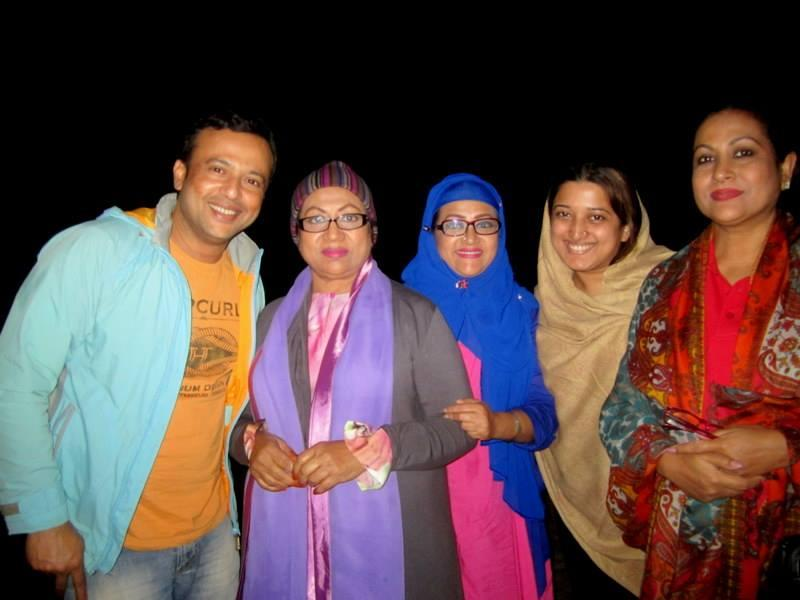
Riaz, Shuchanda, Bobita, Tina and Champa at Cox's Bazar in 2014

Champa married businessman Shahidul Islam Khan in 1982. Together they have a daughter, Esha Ahmed, who is married to Tanvir Ahmed, a son of businessman Kutubuddin Ahmed.

== Works ==
=== Filmography ===
- Amma (1997)
- Tin Kanya (1986)
- Nishpap (1987)
- Bheja Chokh (1988)
- Criminal (1990)
- Shonkhonil Karagar (1992)
- Padma Nadir Majhi (1992)
- Golapi Ekhon Dhakay (1994)
- Target (1995)
- Lal Darja (1997)
- Palabi Kothay (1997)
- Bhai (1998)
- Abar Aranye (2003)
- Adhiar (2003)
- Chandrokotha (2003)
- Shasti (2004)
- Moner Manush (2010)
- Most Welcome 2 (2014)
- Inspector Notty K (2018)
- Ekti Cinemar Golpo (2018)
- Jam† (2020)
- Bishwoshundori (2020)
- Shaan (2020)
- Rickshaw Girl (2025)

=== Television appearances ===
Single appearances

- Buro Shaliker Ghare Row (2010)
- Sedin Tarabanu Aj Tarabanu (2013)

Serials

- Bazpakhi (2003)
- Second Innings (2013)

Telefilms

- Exclusive Interview
- Atopor Bhalobasha (2013)
