= Syed Abdul Hadi =

Bangladeshi singer (born 1940)

- সৈয়দ আব্দুল হাদী
- Hadi in 2026
- Born: 1 July 1940 (age 86); Brahmanbaria, Bengal Province, British India
- Education: University of Dhaka
- Occupation: Playback singer

Syed Abdul Hadi (born 1 July 1940) is a Bangladeshi singer. He won the Bangladesh National Film Award for Best Male Playback Singer five times for his playback performance in the films Golapi Ekhon Traine (1979), Sundori (1979), Koshai (1980), Goriber Bou (1990) and Khoma (1992). He is the recipient of Ekushey Padak in 2000.

== Early life and background ==
Hadi was born at Shahpur village in Kasba, Brahmanbaria in the-then British India. He grew up in Agartala, at his grandfather's house, who was a lawyer of the Agartala court. He was first schooled in Umakanta Academy. His family moved to Sylhet in 1947. He completed his SSC from Annada Model High School in Brahmanbaria and, later, HSC from Dhaka College after six-month study in Carmichael College in Rangpur. He then earned his bachelor's and master's in Bengali from the University of Dhaka.

== Career ==
Hadi debuted as a singer for the film Ye Bhi Ek Kahani (1964).

Hadi retired from his government service job in 1998.

== Personal life ==
Hadi married Farunnahar Usha in 1966. Together they have three daughters.

== Discography ==
=== Solo albums ===
==== Ekbar Jodi Keu Bhalobashto ====
Song name	Tune	Lyricist
Achen Amar Mukhtar	Alauddin Ali	Gazi Mazharul Anwar
Ami Tomari Premo Bhikari	Ahmed Imtiaz Bulbul	Ahmed Imtiaz Bulbul
Chokh Bujhilei Duniya Andhar	Alam Khan	Moniruzzaman Monir
Chokher Nojor	Alauddin Ali	Gazi Mazharul Anwar
Chole Jai Jodi Keu	Subal Das	Gazi Mazharul Anwar
Ekbar Jodi Keu Bhalobashto		
Emonoto Prem Hoy		
Jeyona Shathi		
Jonno Thekhe Jolchi Mago		
Ki Kore Bolibo		
Shoti Mayer Shoti Konna		
Tomader Shukheri Nire		

==== Prithibir Panthoshala ====
Song name	Tune	Lyricist
Prithibir Panthoshala		
Dukkho Chiro Shathire		
Karo Apon Hoite		
Bhalobasha Emoni Ek Nodi		
Amar Doshe Doshi		
Shunno Haate Aj		
Tomar Oi Chokher		
Shokhi Cholona Jolsha		
Tomar Amar Mon		
Chad Mukhe Chondro Groton		
Tomate Dekhlam		
O Chokhe Shopner		

==== Ekdin Chole Jabo ====
Song name	Tune	Lyricist
Ami Tomay Niye		
Ekdin Chloe Jabo		
Babar Kotha Mone Pore		
Ei Chokkhu Bondhu Hoile		
Ei To Besh Achi		
Premer Bhanga Bashi		
Tomake Proyojon Nei		
Bukkher Modhe Ei Nibash		
Tomar Bhalobasha		
Bhikkha De Ma		

==== Kotha Bolbo Na ====
Song name	Tune	Lyricist
Tumi Thake Bolo	Yunus Ali	Moniruzzaman Monir
Kotha Bolbo Na	Ahmed Imtiaz Bulbul	Ahmed Imtiaz Bulbul
He Data He Maula	Ali Hossain	Gazi Mazharul Anwar
Probashi Monta Amar	Azad Rahman	Gazi Mazharul Anwar
Tel Gele Furayya	Alam Khan	Moniruzzaman Monir
Pother Manush Ami Je	Subol Das	Masud Karim
Rater Kole Martha Raisha	Subol Das	Gazi Mazharul Anwar
Prem Emon Khela	M.A. Hamid	Ahmed Zaman Chowdhury
Amar Ganer Malai	Anwar Parvez	Gazi Mazharul Anwar
Ore O Manik Ratan	Robin Ghosh	Ahmed Zaman Chowdhury
Ma Amar Ma	Alam Khan	Mukul Chowdhury
Bhorsha Tomar Kahar Upor	Alam Khan	Mukul Chowdhury

==== Jokhon Vanglo Milon Mela ====
Song name	Tune	Lyricist
Ami Choncholo Hey		Rabindranath Tagore
Momo Joubon Nikunje		Rabindranath Tagore
Tumi Ki Keboli Chobi		Rabindranath Tagore
Tar Biday Belai Malakhani		Rabindranath Tagore
Esho Go Jele Diye Jao		Rabindranath Tagore
Mone Ki Didha		Rabindranath Tagore
Tumi Kemon Kore		Rabindranath Tagore
Jochona Porbe Na Mor Payer Chinho		Rabindranath Tagore

- Niyoti Aamar
- Hazar Tarar Prodeep
- Dag

Mixed albums

- Neel Bedona with Sabina Yasmin
- Balaka with Sabina Yasmin
- Noyonmoni with Sabina Yasmin
- Jonmo Theke Jwolchhi with Samina Chowdhury
- Golden Hits of Syed Abdul Hadi & Sabina Yasmin with Sabina Yasmin

Notable songs

- Aachhen Aamar Muktar
- Aami Tomari Premo Vikhari
- Chokh Bujilei Duniya Aandhar
- Chok'kher Nojor
- Chole Jay Jodi Keu
- Ekbar Jodi Keu Valobasto
- Emonoto Prem Hoy
- JeyoNa Sathi
- Jonmo Theke Jwolchhi
- Ki Kore Bolibo Ami(Keu Konodin Amareto)
- Keno Tare Aami Eto Valobaslam
- Soti Mayer Soti Kon'na
- Tomader Sukher Nire
- Karo Aapon Hoite
- Je Matir Buke
- Ei Prithibir Panthoshalay
- Kotha Bolbo Na Bolechhi
- Jani Tumi Chole Jabe
- Sokhi CholoNa Jolsa Ghore
- Surjodoye Tumi Surjaste Tumi
- Prithibi to DuDiner'i Basa
- Aaul Baul Laloner Deshe
- Ke Jane Koto Dure Sukher Thhikana
- Aamar Doshe Aami Doshi
- Tel Gele Furaiya
- Aami Chokkhu Diya Dekhte Chhilam Jogot Rongila
- Aamar Babar Kotha

== In popular culture ==
A memoir of Hadi, Jiboner Gan, is written by himself. The memoir book, published by Prothoma Prakashani, a sister concern of Prothom Alo, was released on 15 February 2022.
