= Rozina (Bangladeshi actress) =

Bangladeshi film and television actress

- রোজিনা
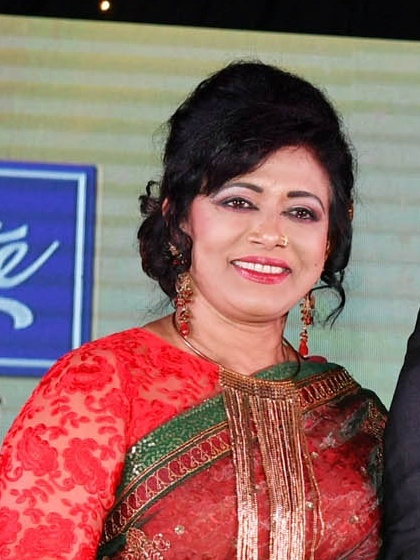
- Rozina in 2019
- Born: Rawshan Ara Rozina
- Occupation: Actress
- Years active: 1977-present
- Awards: full list

Rawshan Ara Rozina (known as Rozina) is a Bangladeshi film and television actress. As of 2018, she has performed in over 300 films. She was a prominent actress in the 1980s. She won Bangladesh National Film Awards for the Best Actress and Best Supporting Actress for her roles in the films Jibondhara (1988) and Koshai (1980) respectively. She also starred opposite to Mithun Chakraborty in Anyaay Abichar. She was awarded Bangladesh National Film Award for Lifetime Achievement in 2023.

Starting her career in the 1970s, initially she became a lead actress but was not able to succeed over other top actresses of the competitive film industry. Nonetheless, she managed to keep her position as a leading actress with successful films such asManosi, Sukher Shonghsar, Shish Mohol, Radha Krishno, Manosi, Sagor Vasha, Raj Singhasan, Dunia,Dhoni Gorib, Akheri Nishan, Duniadari, Bhorosha, Matir Manush, Nadira, Razia Sultana, Jantar Mantar, Thaser Ghor, Rani Chorer Raja, Boro Ma, Tufan Mal, Reshmi Churi, Alomoti Premkumar, Miss Loita, Purnomilon, Josh, and Jantar Mantar.

In the 1980s, she became a sensation and delivered hits after hits to become one of stop female stars at that time. Her successful movies from that time include Nobab, Al Helal, Omor Akbor, Heron Pasha, Zarka, O Chele Kar, Halchal, Ankhi Milon, Avijan, Ganga Jamuna, Chor Dakat Police, Bhul Bichar, Bidhan, Shesh Porichoy, Khotipuron, Mokabela, Rongin Kanchanmala, Nirdoy, Dhon Rotno, Taka Poisa, Dinkal, Jibon Dhara, Saheb, Annay Abichar, Moron Lorai, Raj Kopal, Ghor Bari, Raja Mistri, Raja Saheb, Roshiya Bondhu, Mujahid, Azad, Sajha, Bahadur Meye, and Shotiner Songshar. In the 1980s to mid-1990s, she made her mark in the Indian Bengali film industry in movies such as Rupban, Banglar Bodhu, Sabar Upare Ma, Pita Mata Santan, and Kuch Boron Konna.

== Career ==
Rozina started her career at the age of 16 in the 1976 film Rajmahal, opposite actor Wasim. Then she paired opposite Wasim in a number of films. Their next film was Rosher Baidani. In 1976, she changed her name from Renu to Rozina. They also acted in the films Zarka and Rajshinghasan.

=== 1981-1990 ===
Rozina started acting in Indian Bengali films. In 1985, Hindi film director Shakti Samanta cast this young actress in his Bengali film Anyay Abichar and its Hindi version Aar Paar in the lead role opposite Mithun Chakraborty. She was the first Bangladeshi actress to be cast as a lead actress in a Bollywood film. The film earned 1.5 crores at the box-office which was the highest grossing Bengali film at that time.

In 1988, Rozina achieved Bangladesh National Film Award for Best Actress for her portrayal in Koshai (1988). She lip-synched several songs by Sabina Yasmin such as "O Amar Rasiya Bandhure", "Ei Mon Tomake Dilam", "Jalpari", and "Chhairo Na Chhairo Na Haat".

=== 1991-2000 ===
Rozina starred in several films of West Bengal as a leading actress in the early 1990s. She often acted opposite Chiranjit, Tapas Paul, Ranjit Mallick etc. Then she started doing character roles such as mother, sister, sister-in-law (boudi). She became irregular after 1993.

=== 2001-2010 ===
Rozina made her comeback in Bangladeshi films with the film Rakkhushi (2004) opposite actor Ferdous Ahmed. She was awarded Meril Prothom Alo Awards in Critics Choice Best Film Actress category for her role. She played an insane woman in this film and killed several people to take revenge of her husband's murder. Ferdous was 12–13 years younger than her. It was the first time in Bangladeshi films that an actress worked opposite any actor younger than her by more than a decade.

=== 2011-present ===
Rozina has appeared in several films as character artists in the 2010s opposite Alamgir and others. She directed two serials titled Mejdidi and Borodidi based on Sharat Chandra Chattopadhyay's novels. Besides directing, she played the title role in Mejdidi. She also directed a drama titled Badnam based on Rabindranath Tagore's story. Additionally, she made several TV dramas based on Kazi Nazrul Islam's story.

== Filmography ==
| Year | Film title | Role | Notes |
|---|---|---|---|
| 1976 | Rajmahal | | |
| | Rosher Baidani | | |
| | Rajshinghashon | | |
| | Zarka | | |
| | Tasher Ghor | | |
| | Shukher Shangshar | | |
| | Janota Express | | |
| | Matshakannya | | |
| | Bouma | | |
| 1984 | Suruj Mia | | |
| 1985 | Annay Abichar | | |
| 1988 | Koshai | | |
| 1988 | Jibondhara | | |
| 1990 | Dolna | | |
| | Rajnandini | | |
| | Rajkonna | | |
| | Alibaba Sindabad | | |
| | Dinkal | | |
| | Obichar | | |
| | Chokher Moni | | |
| | Sonar Cheya Dami | | |
| | Matir Manush | | |
| | Shohor Theke Dure | | |
| | Obhijaan | | |
| | Anarkali | | |
| | Bini Sutar Mala | | |
| | Rakhe Allah Mare Ke | | |
| | Sohag Milon | | |
| | Sath Maa | | |
| | Hironpasha | | |
| | Bondhu Amar | | |
| | Chor Police Dakat | | |
| | Ghor Bari Nasib | | |
| | Goli Theke Rajpath | | |
| | Shiri Farhad | | |
| | Bhaggalipi | | |
| | Daku O Darbesh | | |
| | Warish | | |
| | Rangin Rupban | | |
| | Hasu Amar Hasu | | |
| | Razia Sultana | | |
| | Sabuj Mia | | |
| 2004 | Rakkhushi | | |
| 2023 | Fire Dekha | | Also debut director |

== Awards and recognition ==
National Film Awards

- Best Actress - Koshai (1988 )

Meril Prothom Alo Awards

- Critics Choice Best Film Actress - Rakkhushi (2004)
