= Ilias Kanchan =

Bangladeshi actor and road safety activist

- ইলিয়াস কাঞ্চন
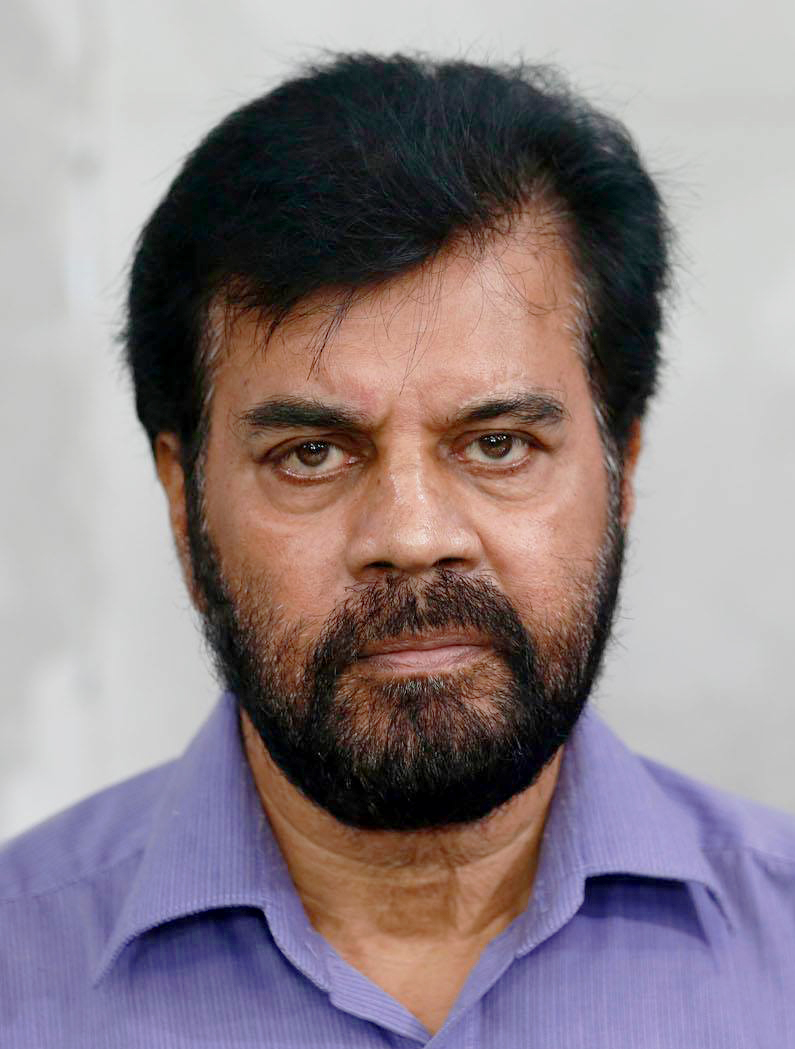
- Kanchan in 2018

Chairman of Janata Party Bangladesh
- Incumbent
- Assumed office 25 March 2025
- Secretary General: Shaukat Mahmood
- Preceded by: office established

Personal details
- Born: 24 December 1956 (age 69) Kishoreganj, East Pakistan, Pakistan
- Spouses: Jahanara Kanchan (m. 1979; died 1993); Parveen Sultana Diti (divorced)
- Education: University of Dhaka
- Occupation: Actor, activist, politician

Idris Ali (born 24 December 1956), known by his stage name Ilias Kanchan, is a Bangladeshi actor and activist. He appeared in more than 300 films. He earned the Bangladesh National Film Award for Lifetime Achievement (2021), the Bangladesh National Film Award for Best Actor for his role in the film Parineeta (1986), and Best Supporting Actor for Shasti (2005). He is a road safety activist in Bangladesh. He was awarded Ekushey Padak for his social service by the government of Bangladesh in 2018. He was the former president of the Bangladesh Film Artistes Association, the organisation of local film artists.

Debuting with the 1977 film Bosundhora, he was unsuccessful in finding himself a lead actor and had to star as a supporting character in films. He eventually rose to prominence and established himself as one of the top stars of the film industry in mid 1980s with films.

In the 1990s, he became a box office sensation as he starred in the highest-grossing film in Bangladesh till 2023. With this film he proved his worth as one of the top stars and continued to be successful with films.

After 2000, he has mostly reduced his work in films. Nonetheless, his films continue to be successful, and he has retained his status as a lead actor with films. In the meantime, he has successfully established his road activists organization, Nirapad Sarak Chai, which he started in 1993, into a massive cause. His other humanitarian work includes giving free driving lessons to needy people, and setting up schools in his neighourhood.

== Early life ==
Kanchan was born in Ashutipara, Karimganj, Kishoreganj, to Abdul Ali and Shorufa Khatun. He completed his higher secondary degree from Kabi Nazrul Government College in 1975. He graduated from the University of Dhaka from the Department of Sociology.

== Career ==
Kanchan debuted his acting career in 1977 through his performance in the film Bashundhara, directed by Subhash Dutta. In 2015, he acted in a children's film, Ghuri, produced by Cinevision Bangladesh and written and directed by filmmaker Zafar Firoze.

On 28 January 2022, Kanchan became the president of the Bangladesh Film Artists' Association for the 2022–24 term after getting 191 votes. His rival, Misha Sawdagor, got 148 votes.

== Personal life ==
Kanchan's first wife, Jahanara Kanchan (born March 3, 1964), died in a road accident on 22 October 1993. His children were also in the accident but they survived. He himself survived a road accident in 1989. He then established a social movement, Nirapad Sarak Chai (We Demand Safe Road). In 2017, the government of Bangladesh declared October 22 as the National Road Safety Day. Together they had a daughter, Israt Jahan Ima, and a son, Mirajul Moin Joy. Kanchan later married actress Parveen Sultana Diti, which ended in divorce.

== Filmography ==
Year	Title	Role	Notes	Ref.
1977	Bashundhara	Zahed	Debut film	
1978	Dumurer Phul	Hasan		
1979	Sundori	Kanchan		
1980	Shesh Uttar	Rahman		
1981	Bhalo Manush	Shawon		
1981	Shakkhi			
1981	Kalmilata	Oli		
1982	Nalish			
1982	Boro Barir Meye			
1983	Mohona: The Mouth of a River			
1983	Sikander	Shamim		
1984	Abhijan	Ratan		
1985	Tin Konya			
1985	Insaaf			
1986	Hum Ek Hayn			
1986	Tauba			
1986	Parineeta	Shekhar Roy		
1986	Bishkonnar Prem			
1987	Protirodh			
1987	Dayee Ke?	Faruk		
1987	Sahajatri			
1988	Adil			
1988	Hushiar			
1988	Zabardast			
1988	Bheja Chokh	Jibon		
1989	Bidhata			
1989	Durnam			
1989	Nikah			
1989	Beder Meye Josna	Prince Shahjada Anwar		
1989	Boner Moto Bon			
1990	Ghor Amar Ghor			
1990	Apon Ghor			
1990	Shonkho Mala			
1990	Shadhin	Rubel		
1990	Ankhi Milon	Milon		
1991	Swashur Bari			
1991	Rajar Meye Bedeni			
1991	Nayjuddho			
1991	Bap Beta 420			
1991	Streer Paona	Robin		
1991	Ochena	Akash Ahmed		
1992	Maa Mati Desh			
1992	Chakor			
1992	Radha Krishna	Krishna		
1992	Beporowa	Milon		
1992	Premer Protidaan			
1992	Sipahi			
1993	Voyangkor Saat Din			
1994	Golapi Ekhon Dhakay	Oli		
1994	Commander	Biplob		
1995	Adorer Sontan	Raju		
1996	Swajan			
1997	Ondho Bhalobasha			
	Doya Maya			
	Shei Toofan			
	Nirontor	Dabir		
	Atto Biswas	Servant		
	Sohrab Rustom	Sohrab		
	Banasree			
	Body Guard			
	Bachar Lorai			
	Amma			
2001	Chairman			
2003	Ora Shahoshi			
	Kalu Gunda			
	Mone Rekho Prithibi			
	Munafik			
	Golaguli			
	Tyag			
	Shot Manush			
	Chorom Aghat			
	Ashol Paisha			
	Bod Sudrot			
	Ai Niye Songshar			
	Meyer Odhikar			
	Bhai Keno Ashami			
	Mohoth			
	Mukho Mukhi			
2004	Shasti	Dukhi Ram Rui		
	Gupto Ghatok			
	Ashami Greftar			
	Amar Adalot			
	Ochin Desher Rajkumar			
	Bashi Wala			
	I Love You			
	Gariyal Bhai			
	Shukher Ghore Dukher Agun			
	Ondho Bhalobasha			
	Shesh Uttar			
	Durjoy			
2008	Baba Amar Baba		Also director	
2010	Mayer Swapno		Also director	
2015	Ghuri			
2015	Epar Opar			
2016	Hothat Dekha			
2018	Bizli			
2023	Fire Dekha			
2023	Netri - The Leader			

== Television ==
- Obanchito
- Charulota
- Nijhum Aronno
- Thandar kanddo
- Bachar boro shadh cilo
- Lal golap
- Othocho
- Tuccho
- Second Innings (2014)
- Moronottom (2021)
- Boiwala (2022)
- Rupantor (2024)

== Awards ==
- Bangladesh National Film Award for Best Actor (1986)
- Bachsas Award
- Zia Gold Award
- Sher-e-Bangla Smriti Padak
- Chalachitra Darshak Award
- Bangladesh Journalist Welfare Association award
- National Journalist Welfare Sangstha award
- Dhaka City Corporation Nagar Padak
- Nivetha Singapore Award
- Voyage of America Award
- Bangladesh Cultural Movement award
- Dhaka Juba Foundation Award
