= Farida Akhtar Babita =

Bangladeshi film actress

Bobita
- ববিতা
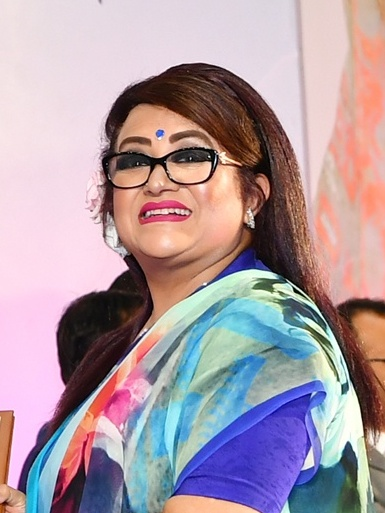
- Babita in 2023
- Born: Farida Akhter Poppy; 30 July 1953 (age 73); Bagerhat, East Bengal, Dominion of Pakistan
- Occupation: Actress
- Spouse: Iftekharul Alam
- Children: Anik Islam
- Parents: ASM Nizamuddin Ayub (father); Jahan Ara Begum (mother)
- Relatives: Shuchanda (sister); Champa (sister); Zahir Raihan (brother-in-law); Riaz (cousin); Omar Sani (nephew)
- Awards: Ekushey Padak (2026); National Film Awards

Farida Akhtar Poppy, known by her stage name Babita, (born 30 July 1953) is a Bangladeshi film actress. She is best known for her performance in Satyajit Ray's Distant Thunder, a novel adaptation about the Bengal famine of 1943, which won the Golden Bear prize at the 23rd Berlin International Film Festival in 1973. She was active in the 1970s through 1990s as an actress in Bangladeshi films. She acted in 275 films.

After winning the National Film Award in 1975, she won three consecutive best actress prizes. She won Best Actor in 1986, Best Producer in 1997 and Best Supporting Actress Award twice in 2002 and 2012. In addition, she was awarded the lifetime achievement award of the National Film Award in the year 2016. In 2023, Bob Dubey, the mayor of Richardson, a city in North Texas, officially declared 5 August as "Babita Day" in honor of her. In 2026, she was awarded with the Ekushe Padak, for her special contribution to film.

== Early life ==
Babita, nicknamed Poppy, was born to a family that had its origins in the west-Bangladeshi district of Bagherhat, Bangladesh. Her father ASM Nizamuddin Ayub was a government officer and mother Jahan Ara Begum was a doctor. They were in Bagerhat due to their father's job. She has three sisters and three brothers. Babita's mother studied in Lady Brabourne College in Calcutta. In an interview with the Independent newspaper in 2004, Babita says that it was Afzal Chowdhury who suggested the screen name Babita for her. In another interview with the Daily Star in 2005, she mentioned that Zahir Raihan originally cast her for the film Shongshaar. A different version of the story is that she adopted the name after appearing in Ehtesham's film Pitch Dhala Path.

Babita's brother-in-law Zahir Raihan first cast her for his film Jaltey Suraj Ka Nichey. The film was not completed in the end but she found a break-through into the Dhaka film industry. Her first released feature was Shesh Porjonto. Among the three sisters and three brothers are elder sister Shuchanda who is a film actress, elder brother Shaheedul Islam is an Electrical Engineer, currently living in Australia, another brother Iqbal Islam is a Pilot officer, younger sister Champa is a film actress and younger brother Ferdous Islam is currently living in the United States.

== Education ==
Babita studied in her early days at Dawood Public School in Jessore. During her studies there, due to her sister's arrival in the film, she came to Dhaka with her family. Later she studied in Gloria School. She earned proficiency in English, including some foreign languages like Urdu and Hindi. She refined herself to the level of an ideal artist.

== Personal life ==
Babita married Iftekharul Alam, a businessman. Together they had a son, Anik. Iftekharul died when Anik was three. She never remarried after that. Babita's sisters Shuchanda and Champa are also film actresses.

== Career ==
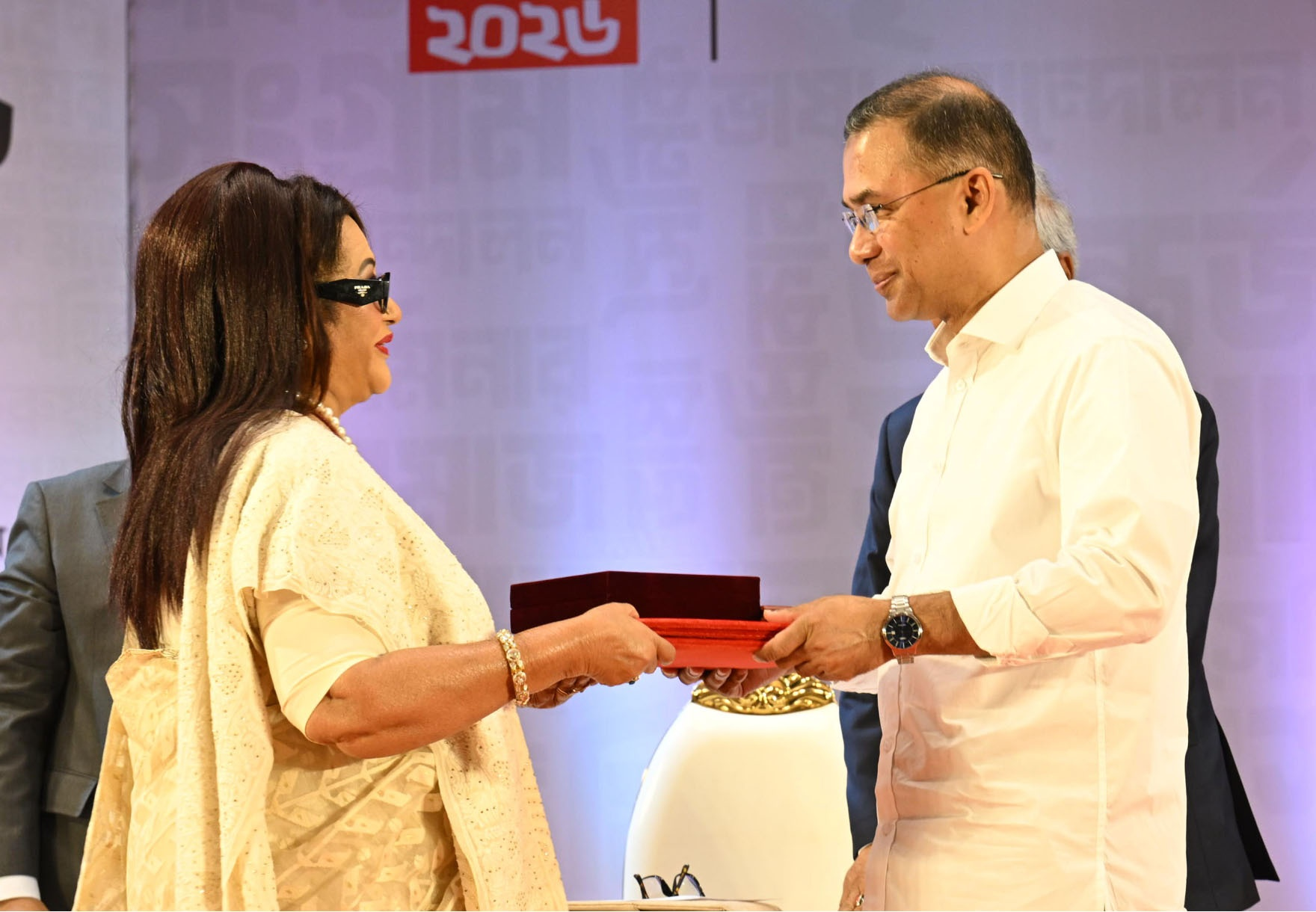
Babita receives Ekushay Padak from Prime Minister Tarique Rahman in February 2026.

=== Actress ===
Babita's notable work includes Shukhe Thako, Taka Anna Pai, Shorolipi, Manusher Mon, Pich Dhala Path, Noyon Moni, Jonmo Theke Jolchi and Anarkoli. Her acting gained the attention of the Indian director Satyajit Ray. In 1973, Ray cast Babita in Ashani Sanket ("Distant Thunder"), his film about the Bengal famine of 1943. Babita appeared in the lead role of Ananga, the demure wife of the village doctor Gangacharan, who was played by long-time Ray favorite Soumitra Chatterjee.

Babita acted in number of joint venture film projects in her career, namely: a Canada-India joint production film Durdesh in 1983 (Gehri Chot - Urf: Durdesh in Hindi) opposite Nadeem Baig (actor) and also Pakistan-Bangladesh joint venture film Miss Lanka (Nadaani in Urdu) in 1985. Ashani Sanket won the Golden Bear prize at the 1973 Berlin Film Festival. Babita's performance was central to the film.

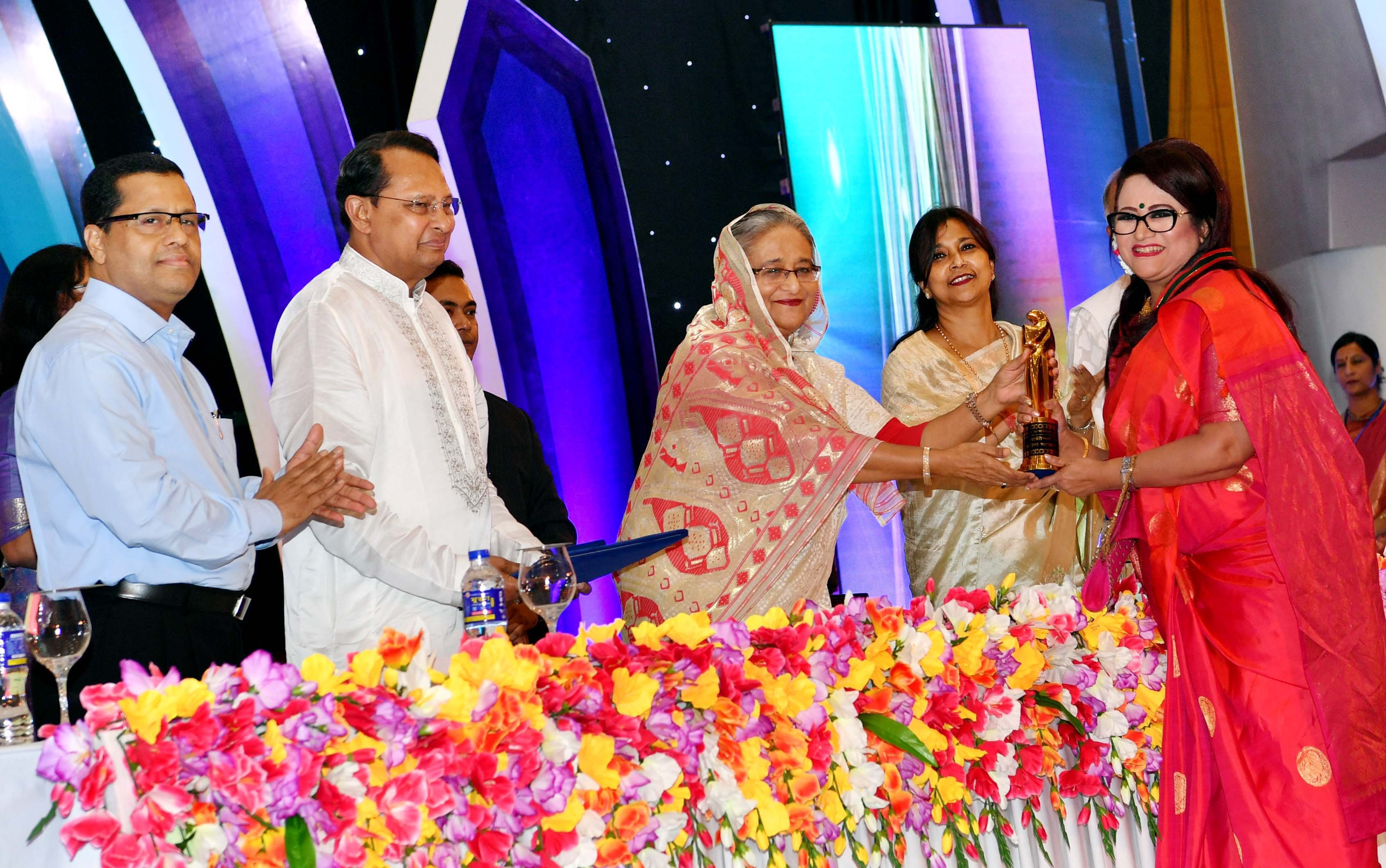
Babita receives Lifetime Achievement Award at National Film Awards 2016 from Prime Minister Sheikh Hasina.

Babita also acted in Arunodoyer Agnishakkhi (1972) by Subhash Dutta, Dhire Bohe Meghna (1973) by Alamgir Kabir, Golapi Ekhon Trainey (1978) by Amjad Hossain, Dahan (1986) by Sheikh Niamat Ali, and Dipu Number Two (1996) by Morshedul Islam.

Babita's male co-actors were Razzak, Faruk, Zafar Iqbal, Bulbul Ahmed, and Sohel Rana.

=== 1968–1974 ===
Babita made her debut as a child actor in the Songsar film of Zahir Raihan starring elder sister Shuchanda. In this film she plays the daughter of Razzaq and Shuchanda. Her primary name in the film was "Subarna". She acted in a television drama called "Kalam" at that time. Her name became "Babita" when she appeared in Zaheer Raihan's film "Jalte Suraj Ki Niche". In the role of the first heroine in 1969, she starred in the film. The film was released on 14 August 1969 and on that day her mother died. Throughout the 70's, she established herself as one of the best actresses of the decade.

=== Since 2000 ===
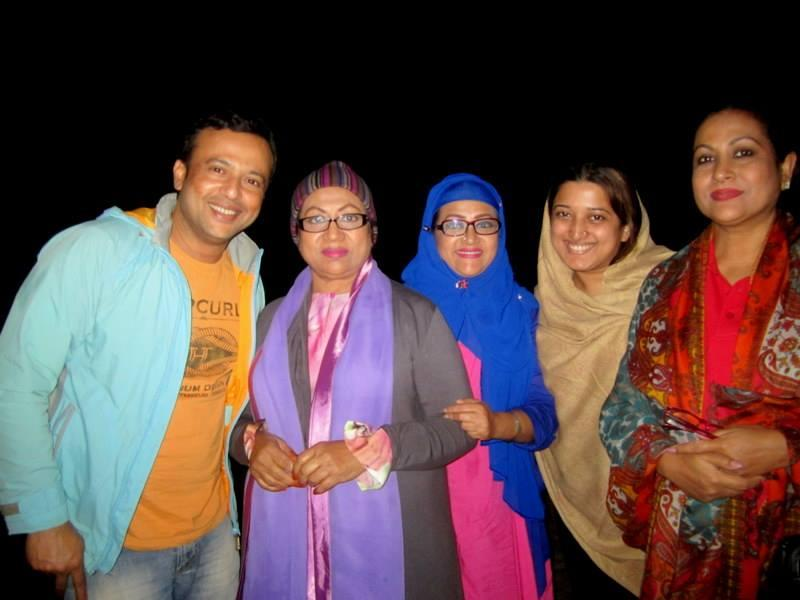
Riaz, Shuchanda, Babita, Tina and Champa at Cox's Bazar in 2014

In 2002, Babita won a National Film Award for Best Supporting Actress for her role in Hason Raja, Chashi Nazrul Islam's biopic of the Bengali folk-poet. She has also formed her own film-production company and has expressed an interest in directing in the future. She also starred in Shahin-Sumon's action drama Khodar Pore Ma co-starring Shakib Khan, played as his mother. The film received positive reviews and declared as a super-hit and become the highest-grossing film of 2012 and received several National Film Awards including Khan's second National Film Award for Best Actor at the 37th National Film Awards.

Babita has campaigned actively on behalf of various social causes in Bangladesh. Notable among the causes she has supported the campaign against throwing acid on women; the national immunization drive for children; and a support group for children who suffer from leukemia. Starting in 2011, Babita began working with Distressed Children & Infants International as a goodwill ambassador.

=== Producer ===
After the commercial success of Teen Kannya (1985), a film produced by Babita's elder sister Shuchanda, Babita became interested in producing films and hence launched a film production house named "Babita Movies." Some of Babita's produced films include Ful Shojja, Agomon, Lady Smuggler (a Bangladesh-Pakistan-Nepal joint venture film), Lottery and Poka Makorer Ghor Bosoti (a Bangladesh Government sponsored film).

== Filmography ==
Year	Film	Role	Note	Ref
1968	Songsar	Laily	Child artist	
1969	Shesh Porjonto	Bobby	Debut as a lead role	
1970	Taka Ana Pai	Rina		
1970	Santan			
1970	Pich Dhala Poth	Rani	Supporting role	
1971	Shorolipi	Mita		
1971	Jaltey Suraj Ke Neeche	Bobita	Debut in Urdu film	
1972	Arunodoyer Agnishakkhi	Romena		
1972	Manusher Mon			
1972	Yea Kore Biye	Shova		
1973	Distant Thunder	Angana Banu		
1973	Abar Tora Manush Ho	Romena		
1973	Dhire Bohe Meghna	Anita Gupta	Indo-Bangladesh joint production	
1973	Rater Pore Din			
1974	Alor Michil			
1974	Shesh Hote Shuru			
1975	Bandi Theke Begum	Chadni	Winner – Bangladesh National Film Award for Best Actress	
1975	Lathial	Banu		
1976	Ek Mutho Vat			
1976	Ki Je Kori	Shahana Chowdhury		
1976	Noyonmoni	Moni	Winner – Bangladesh National Film Award for Best Actress	
1976	Bondini			
1976	Surjogrohon			
1977	Ononto Prem			
1977	Nishan			
1977	Bosundhora	Chobi	Winner – Bangladesh National Film Award for Best Actress	
1978	Agnishikha			
1978	Ashami Hajir			
1978	Golapi EKhon Traine	Golapi		
1978	Fokir Majnu Shah			
1978	Dumurer Phul	Nurse Rokiya		
1979	Jinjir	Nina		
1979	Bela Shesher Gaan			
1979	Sundori	Sundori		
1979	Surjo Sangram			
1980	Ekhoni Somoy			
1980	Koshai			
1980	Protigga			
1981	Bhalo Manush	Shuma		
1981	Jonmo Theke Jolchi			
1982	Nat Bou			
1982	Boro Barir Meye			
1983	Door-Desh	Pinky Khanna	Hindi film	
1983	Notun Bou			
1983	Nag Purnima	Laci		
1983	Laily Mojnu	Laily		
1984	Penshon	Khuki		
1985	Tin Konna	Boby		
1985	Dahan	Aivi	Winner – Bachsas Award for Best Actress	
1985	Premik			
1985	Miss Lanka			
1985	Ramer Sumati	Narayoni	Winner – Bangladesh National Film Award for Best Actress	
1985	Sohel Rana			
1986	Miss Bangkok			
1987	Lady Smuggler	Fayyaz	Urdu film	
1988	Agomon	Sajeda		
1988	Pothe Holo Dekha			
1989	Biroho Byatha	Surjomukhi		
1989	Biranggona Sokhina			
1991	Padma Meghna Jamuna	Saju		
1991	Shoshurbari			
1992	Professor	Salma		
1994	Golapi Ekhon Dhakay	Golapi		
1994	Dakat	Asma		
1994	Moha Genjam	Rani		
1994	Ainer Hat	Asha		
1995	Mohamilon	Shahana Mollik		
1996	Jibon Songsar			
1996	Dipu Number Two	MS Rowshon		
1996	Poka Makorer Ghor Bosoti		Winner – Bangladesh National Film Award for Best Actress	
1996	Mayer Odhikar	Asha Siddiqa		
1996	Shopner Prithibi	Sultana		
2012	Khodar Pore Ma	Munna's Mother		
2011	Ke Apon Ke Por		Winner – Bangladesh National Film Award for Best Supporting Actress	
2013	Purno Doirgho Prem Kahini	Narrator		
2015	Putro Ekhon Paisawala			

== Awards ==
Babita won three consecutive National Film Awards for three consecutive years. She received the Best Actress Award from the Bangla Film Journalist Association for her performance in Satyajit Ray's Distant Thunder film. Besides, she has received numerous awards, both public and private. That is why she was called a 'prize daughter'. She participated in the International Film Festival for the most number of Bangladeshi delegates.

Year	Award name	Category	Film	Result	Ref.
1975	Bangladesh National Film Awards	Best Actress	Bandi Theke Begum	Won	
1976	Bangladesh National Film Awards	Best Actress	Noyonmoni	Won	
1977	Bangladesh National Film Awards	Best Actress	Basundhara (film)	Won	
1985	Bangladesh National Film Awards	Best Actress	Ramer Sumoti	Won	
1996	Bangladesh National Film Awards	Best film producer	Poka Makorer Ghor Bosoti	Won	
2002	Bangladesh National Film Awards	Best supporting actress	Hason Raja	Won	
2011	Bangladesh National Film Awards	Best supporting actress	Ke Apon Ke Por	Won	
2016	Bangladesh National Film Awards	Lifetime Achievement Award	–	Won	
2026	Ekushey Padak	Lifetime Achievement	–	Won	
1972	Jahir Rayhan Padak			Won	
1989	Ershad Padak			Won	
1993	Bangladesh Film Directors Association	Special prize	Distant Thunder	Won	
2012	Bangladesh National Film Awards	Best Supporting Actress	Ke Apon Ke Por	Won	
2002	Dhallywood Music & Film Lifetime Achievement Award	Best Actress		Won	
2009	Dhallywood Music & Film Lifetime Achievement Award	Best Actress		Won	
1993	Bengal Film Journalists Association Award, India	Best Actress	Distant Thunder	Won	
1983	National Film Award of Pakistan	Best Actress	Naadani (Miss Lanka)	Won	
1974	Bangladesh Cine Journalists Association Award (Bachsas Awards)	Best Actress		Won	
1977	Bangladesh Cine Journalists Association Award (Bachsas Awards)	Best Actress		Won	
1980	Bangladesh Cine Journalists Association Award (Bachsas Awards)	Best Actress		Won	
1985	Bangladesh Cine Journalists Association Award (Bachsas Awards)	Best Actress	Dahan	Won	
2003	Bangladesh Cine Journalists Association Award (Bachsas Awards)	Best supporting actress	Hason Raja	Won	
2012	Bangladesh Cine Journalists Association Award (Bachsas Awards)	Best Actress	Khodar Pore Ma	Won	
