= Golapi Ekhon Bilatey =

Bangladeshi film

- VCD cover
- Directed by: Amjad Hussain
- Written by: Amjad Hussain
- Produced by: M.R. Haque; Syed Hassan
- Starring: Mithun Chakraborty; Moushumi; Shabnur; Ferdous Ahmed
- Music by: Gunwant Raj; Ram Shankar
- Release date: 29 January 2010
- Running time: 125 minutes
- Country: Bangladesh
- Language: Bengali
- Budget: est. ৳90.35 lakh

Golapi Ekhon Bilatey is a 2010 Bangladeshi film written and directed by Amjad Hussain. It stars Mithun Chakraborty, Moushumi, Shabnur, Ferdous Ahmed, Prabir Mitra and Ahmed Sharif. Amjad Hussain directed two other films before, Golapi Ekhon Traine (1978), Golapi Ekhon Dhakay (1995) but they are not the prequel of this film. The filming of Golapi Ekhon Bilatey began in May 2006 and it was released on 29 January 2010 in Bangladesh.

== Snippets ==
The film was shot at the below mentioned locations:

- Dhaka, Bangladesh
- Houses of Parliament, Westminster, London, England, UK
- Southend-on-Sea, Essex, England, UK
- Trafalgar Square, St James's, London, England, UK

== Cast ==
- Mithun Chakraborty
- Moushumi
- Shabnur
- Ferdous Ahmed
- Prabir Mitra
- Ahmed Sharif
- M. D. Jahiduzzaman
- Kabila
- Ahsanul Haq Minu
- Sharmili Ahmed
- Rina Khan
- Munmun Ahmed

== See also ==
- Golapi (franchise)
