= Rawshan Jamil =

Bangladeshi actress and dancer (1931–2002)

- রওশন জামিল
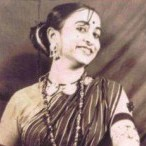
- Born: 8 May 1931; Rokanpur, Dhaka, Bengal Presidency, British India
- Died: 14 May 2002 (aged 71)
- Education: Eden Mohila College
- Spouse: Gauhar Jamil (m. 1952; died 1980)
- Awards: full list

Rawshan Jamil (8 May 1931 – 14 May 2002) was a Bangladeshi actress and dancer. She was awarded the Ekushey Padak in the dance category in 1995 and the Bangladesh National Film Award for Best Supporting Actress for her role in Noyonmoni (1976).

== Early life and education ==
Jamil was born in Dhaka. Her father was Abdul Karim.

After passing the matriculation exam, Jamil was admitted into Shilpakala Bhavan in Wari.

She married the dance instructor Ganesh Nath (later Gauhar Jamil) in 1952. Together, they set up Jago Art Center in 1959.

== Career ==
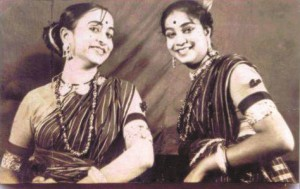
Jamil with her sister Alpana in 1962

Starting as an actress in television in 1965, Jamil acted in over 300 television plays, including Rakkhushi, Palabodol and Shokal Shondhya. She featured in around 200 films. Her film career started in 1967 with Alibaba Challish Chor.

== Works ==
=== Films ===
- Gori
- Git Kahi Savgeet Kahi
- Moner Mato Bou
- Jibon Theke Neya (1970)
- Surya Sangram
- Ora Egaro Jon (1972)
- Adhikar
- Titash Ekti Nadir Naam (1973)
- Agun
- Noyonmoni (1976)
- Poka Makorer Ghor Bosoti
- Sujan Sakhi
- Golapi Ekhon Traine (1978)
- Abar Tora Manus Ha
- Matir Ghar
- Badhu Biday
- Saheb Bibi Golam
- Surja Dighal Bari (1979)
- Pension, Lal Kajal
- Kalmilata
- Devdas (1982)
- Chitkar
- Shes Uttar
- Ramer Sumati
- Janani
- Beder Meye Josna (1989)
- Mis Lalita
- Nader Chand
- Matir Kole
- Shonkhonil Karagar (1992)
- Chitra Nodir Pare (1999)
- Srabon Megher Din (2000)
- Bandhan Hara
- Dahan
- Julie
- Desh Bidesh
- Lalsalu (2001)

== Awards ==
- Bangladesh National Film Award for Best Supporting Actress (1976), (1999)
- Bangladesh Film Journalist Association Award
- Tarakalok Puruskar
- Ekushey Padak (1995)
