= Padma Nadir Majhi =

1993 Bangladeshi film by Goutam Ghose

Boatman of the River Padma
- Poster
- Directed by: Goutom Ghosh
- Screenplay by: Goutom Ghosh
- Based on: Padma Nadir Majhi by Manik Bandopadhay
- Produced by: West Bengal Government; Ashirbad Film
- Starring: Raisul Islam Asad; Champa; Utpal Dutt; Roopa Ganguly; Rabi Ghosh
- Cinematography: Goutom Ghosh
- Edited by: Moloy Banerjee
- Music by: Goutom Ghosh; Alauddin Ali
- Distributed by: National Film Development Corporation of India
- Release date: 12 March 1993 (India)
- Running time: 126 minutes
- Countries: India; Bangladesh
- Language: Bengali

Padma Nadir Majhi is a 1993 Indo-Bangladesh joint production feature drama film directed by Goutom Ghosh. Based on Manik Bandopadhyay's novel of the same name, it shows life of fishermen of the Padma River.

== Plot ==
Hossain Miya (Utpal Dutta) is a Bengali Muslim trader who offers his community an idealistic vision: He wants to establish a little utopia on an island (Moynadeep) in the Padma delta and offer them a better life there. It is apparent that Hossian Miya has a flourishing business there, because he has recently purchased a huge boat because of expanding business. He doesn't care if the people who populate it are Hindu or Muslim. It is 1947, just before the partition of India, and the Hindu fisherman Kuber briefly accepts an offer by Hossain to ferry some of the community's cargo from the island. He would be fishing, except that the fish he usually catches have been driven away by a big storm.

In the process of getting the cargo, he gets to see what the colony is like and, even though he is fully aware of the gripes of a former colony member and the limitations of it, comes to share some of the utopian vision. When Kuber returns to his home and a variety of unfortunate events force him to leave, he knows just where to go.

However, people who return from Moynadeep after working there has a different tale to narrate. Rasu (Sunil Mukherjee) and Aminuddin (Rabi Ghosh) say that Moynadeep is infested with lions and tigers, and there is forest all around. Rasu has fled from Moynadeep deserting his wife and children there. Aminuddin, too, refuses to go back to Moynadeep again. Kuber has a wife and daughter and was recently blessed with a child. His wife is beset with a leg deformity, and his daughter is grown up and engaged to a local man. Kuber goes to pay a visit to his relatives from his wife's side. On return, he brings along his sister-in-law Kapila (Roopa Ganguly) with a ton of small kids. Kapila was married but is now estranged from her husband. A sneaky amorous relationship develops between Kubir and Kapila. Staying with a deformed wife and coupled with amorous gestures from his alluring sister-in-law Kubir succumbs to her wishes of passion play. However, Kapila's husband re-appears and takes her away with him.

One day a storm rises in the Padma River and leaves behind a trail of destruction. Kuber tells his wife "Padda amago joto daay abar totoi loy" (It is true Padda gives us a lot, but in return it also takes a lot from us). The storm wreaks havoc in the village. Hussian Miya offers to lend a helping hand to the villagers. He does so, but in return he takes their thumb impressions as proof of his help so that he can use it later to exploit them. Meanwhile, Kuber's daughter's marriage breaks down. Rasu proposes to marry her. Even though Rasu was close to Kuber, he refuses to accept the match because of the age difference between them. Rasu becomes furious and threatens to ruin Kuber. He succeeds in his endeavor. Kuber is fabricated in a theft case, and police is now trying to nab him. He flees to Hussain Miya for help. Hossain Miya tells he can absolve him of the theft charge, but in return Kubir must go to Moynadeep. Kuber agrees to the offer. Kuber goes to Moynadeep. A new life unfolds for him there. These concluding sequences from the film add up to a compelling climax.

== Cast ==
- Raisul Islam Asad as Kuber
- Champa as Mala
- Utpal Dutt as Hosen
- Rupa Gangooly as Kopila
- Rabi Ghosh as Aminuddin
- Ahsanul Haque Minu as Gonsha
- Mamata Shankar
- Anisur Rahman Anis
- Sunil Mukhopadhyay
- Bimal Deb
- Ajijiul Hakim
- Aminil Hak Chowdhury
- Mukti Anwar
- Rasul Islam
- Tandra Islam

== Production ==
The film was shot entirely on location within Bangladesh.

== Reception ==
Derek Malcolm, writing in Variety, said the ravishingly photographed film is "sure to make its mark as quality arthouse and fest fare". Ashfaque Swapan of India West felt that the film wasn't as good as it could have been. He wrote that it "is too deeply anchored to the riverbank ... one would like to see the fishermen more often in their element, working in their boats, grappling with the river". He found it overly long and meandering, but praised the cinematography as "breathtaking at times".

== Accolades ==
=== From India ===
- National Film Award for Second Best Feature Film (1994)
- National Film Award for Best Direction-Goutom Ghosh (1994)

=== International ===
- UNESCO Award, Cannes Film Festival (1993)
- Bangladesh National Film Award for Best Film (producer Habibur Rahman Khan) (1993)
- Bangladesh National Film Award for Best Actor - Raisul Islam Asad (1993)
- Bangladesh National Film Award for Best Actress - Champa (1993)
