= Anwara Begum =

Bangladeshi film actress

Anowara
- আনোয়ারা
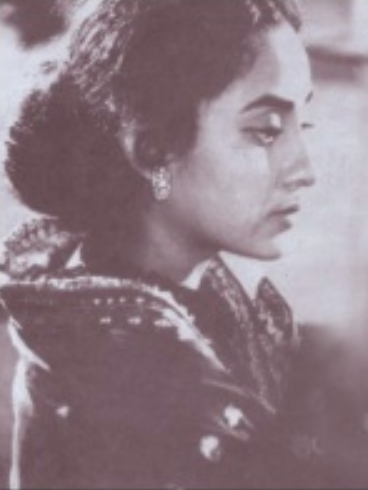
- Begum in the film Nawab Sirajuddaula (1967)
- Born: Anowara Begum; January 17, 1950 (age 76)
- Occupation: Actress
- Years active: 1964–2021
- Spouse: Muhitul Islam Muhit (m. 1972)
- Children: Rumana Islam Mukti
- Relatives: Nargis Akhter (sister)

Anwara Begum (known as Anwara) is a Bangladeshi film actress. She has acted in more than 600 films as of 2015. She earned Bangladesh National Film Award for Lifetime Achievement (2020) from Bangladesh government. She won Bangladesh National Film Award for Best Supporting Actress a record seven times for her roles in Golapi Ekhon Traine (1978), Sundori (1979), Sokhinar Juddho (1984), Moroner Pore (1990), Radha Krishna (1992), Banglar Badhu (1993) and Ontore Ontore (1994), and Best Actress award once for Shuvoda (1986).

== Career ==
In 1961, while Anwara was a student of seventh grade in Palasi Girls' School, she performed as a dancer in a group for the film Aajan. The film was never released. In 1963, Anwara acted as a dancer in two films Nachghor and Preeti Na Jane Reet. She then acted as a supporting actress in the film Sangam (1964). She performed as an actress in a lead role for Bala (1967). She got her breakthrough in 1967 for her Aleya role in the film Nawab Sirajuddaula.

Since 1972, Anwara started performing in roles of mothers, aunts and mothers-in-law.

== Personal life ==
Anwara married to Muhitul Islam Muhit in 1972. Anwara has a daughter, Rumana Islam Mukti. She has a granddaughter named Karima Darodi.

== Filmography ==
Year	Title	Role	Director	Notes	Ref(s)
1964	Sangam		Zahir Raihan		
1965	Janajani				
1965	Ekaler Rupkotha				
1967	Nawab Sirajuddaula	Aleya	Khan Ataur Rahman		
1967	Bala				
1976	Nayanmoni	Padma Kaki			
1978	Golapi Ekhon Traine	Moina	Amjad Hossain	won Bangladesh National Film Award for Best Supporting Actress	
1979	Sundori		Amjad Hossain	won Bangladesh National Film Award for Best Supporting Actress	
1980	Kosai				
1980	Goriber Meye				
1980	Bashori				
1982	Devdas	Chandramukhi	Chashi Nazrul Islam		
1982	Joboraaj	Chadni			
1984	Sokhinar Juddo			won Bangladesh National Film Award for Best Supporting Actress	
1986	Shuvoda		Chashi Nazrul Islam	won Bangladesh National Film Award for Best Actress	
1989	Bouma				
1990	Moroner Pore			won Bangladesh National Film Award for Best Supporting Actress	
1991	Danga	Amena Begum	Kazi Hayat		
1992	Radha Krishna			won Bangladesh National Film Award for Best Supporting Actress	
1993	Banglar Badhu			won Bangladesh National Film Award for Best Supporting Actress	
1994	Ontore Ontore	Dadi		won Bangladesh National Film Award for Best Supporting Actress	
1999	Srabon Megher Din	Kusum's Mother	Humayun Ahmed		
2013	Purno Doirgho Prem Kahini	Rokeya Begum/Dadi	Safi Uddin Safi		
2014	Chini Bibi	Dadi	Nazrul Islam Babu		
2016	Ojante Bhalobasha	Prem's grandma	A J Rana		
