= Amjad Hossain =

Bangladeshi film director, actor, scriptwriter and lyricist

- আমজাদ হোসেন
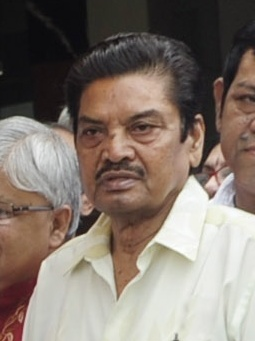
- Amjad Hossain in 2018
- Born: 14 August 1942; Jamalpur, Bengal Presidency, British India
- Died: 14 December 2018 (aged 76); Bangkok, Thailand
- Occupations: Film director, Actor, Scriptwriter, Lyricist
- Years active: 1961–2018
- Children: Sazzad Hossain Dodul (son); Shohel Arman (son)
- Awards: full list

Amjad Hossain (14 August 1942 – 14 December 2018) was a Bangladeshi film director, actor, scriptwriter and lyricist. He won the Bangladesh National Film Award for Best Director twice, for the films Golapi Ekhon Traine (1978) and Bhat De (1984). He also won Bangla Academy Literary Award in 2004 and Ekushey Padak in 1992.

== Early life ==
Amjad was born in Jamalpur, Bengal Presidency (now Bangladesh). He began his creative journey through writing, starting with poetry. His first poem was published in the renowned magazine Desh. Hossain also wrote numerous stories, poems, and novels for children. Additionally, he authored works related to Bangladesh's Liberation War.

== Career ==
He began his film career in 1961 with a role in the movie "Tomar Amar." That same year, he also acted in the film "Harano Din," directed by Mustafiz. Director Salahuddin adapted his play Dharapat into a film, which was released in 1963, marking his debut as a screenwriter. He also played a lead role in the film. Later, he joined Zahir Raihan's team and worked as an assistant on several films, including the notable Behula (1966), which was based on folklore. The production of Behula began in 1962, and he contributed to the dialogue writing and acted in the film. While working on this film, he developed a close friendship with actor Razzak, a bond that lasted until Razzak's death. He also acted alongside Razzak in Zahir Raihan's film Anowara (1967).

He made his debut as film director with the film Agun Niye Khela (1967), which he co-directed with Nurul Haque Bacchu. His first solo directorial venture was Julekha (1967). The following year, he collaborated with Nurul Haque Bacchu, Mostafa Mehmud, and Rahim Nawaz to direct the film Dui Bhai, with Zahir Raihan serving as the producer and screenwriter. Additionally, he independently directed the film Balya Bandhu (1968).

In 1970, he wrote the dialogues for Zahir Raihan's iconic film Jibon Theke Neya and portrayed the character Madhu. This film later became immensely popular in Bangladesh. Throughout the 1970s, he directed several notable films, including Noyonmoni (1976), Golapi Ekhon Train-e (1978), and Sundori (1979). Noyonmoni was based on his novel Nirakkhor Sworge, and it earned him his first National Film Award for Best Screenwriter. Golapi Ekhon Train-e brought him widespread acclaim both domestically and internationally, winning National Awards in 10 categories, including Best Film. Amjad Hossain set a record by winning five awards in a single year, including Best Film (as producer), Director, Screenwriter, Dialogue Writer, and Lyricist. Following the success of Golapi Ekhon Train-e, he continued his streak with the film Sundori, which won National Film Awards in seven categories, and Hossain received two awards for Best Dialogue Writer and Lyricist. In the 1980s, Amjad directed several notable Bengali films, including Koshai (1980), Jonom Theke Jolchi (1982), Dui Poishar Alta (1982), and Bhat De (1984). Bhat De was particularly distinguished, winning National Film Awards in nine categories, including Best Film. Amjad himself received three awards for Best Director, Screenwriter, and Dialogue Writer for the same film.

== Political career ==
He participated in the 1969 mass uprising and the Bangladesh Liberation War. Additionally, he was associated with the political activities of the Nationalist Cultural Organization (JASAS), an affiliate of the Bangladesh Nationalist Party (BNP).

== Personal life ==
Amjad Hossain had two sons, Sajjad Hossain Dodul and Sohel Arman, both of whom are directors and screenwriters. In November 2018, he suffered an ischemic stroke and was admitted to Impulse Hospital in Dhaka. Subsequently, on November 27, he was transferred to Bangkok for advanced treatment with government funding. Amjad Hossain died on December 14, 2018, at Bumrungrad Hospital in Bangkok at the age of 76. His body was returned to Bangladesh on December 20, and after his burial, he was buried in the municipal cemetery in Jamalpur.

== Filmography ==
Year	Film	Notes
1961	Tomar Amar	
1967	Agun Niye Khela	
1967	Julekha	
1967	Anwara	
1968	Balyo Bandhu	
1970	Pitaputra	
1970	Jibon Theke Neya	
1973	Abar Tora Manush Ho	Bachsas Award for Best Story
1976	Noyonmoni	Bachsas Award for Best Dialogue
1978	Golapi Ekhon Traine	Bangladesh National Film Award for Best Film; Bangladesh National Film Award for Best Dialogue; Bangladesh National Film Award for Best Script; Bangladesh National Film Award for Best Director; Bangladesh National Film Award for Best Music Director; Bachsas Award for Best Dialogue
1979	Sundori	Bangladesh National Film Award for Best Lyrics
1980	Koshai	
1982	Dui Poisar Alta	
1982	Jonmo Theke Jolchi	Bachsas Award for Best Lyrics
1984	Bhat De	Bangladesh National Film Award for Best Director; Bachsas Award for Best Dialogue
1984	Sokhinar Juddha	
1988	Hiramoti	Bachsas Award for Best Director
1994	Golapi Ekhon Dhakay	
1995	Adorer Sontan	
2002	Sundori Bodhu	
2003	Praner Manush	
2005	Kal Sokale	
2010	Golapi Ekhon Bilatey	
2017	Premi O Premi	First film with Arifin Shuvoo, Nusraat Faria, Director: Jakir Hossain Raju
2018	Bhalo Theko	Last film, Director: Jakir Hossain Raju

== Awards ==
- Fazlul Haque Memorial Award (2009)
- Uro Shishu Shahitya Puroshkar (2008)
- Bangla Academy Literary Award (2004)
- Ekushey Padak (1992)
- Bangladesh National Film Award 1978, 1979, 1984
