= Sundori =

1979 Bangladeshi film

- Poster
- সুন্দরী
- Directed by: Amjad Hossain
- Starring: Farida Akhtar Babita; Ilias Kanchan; Jashim
- Release date: 1979
- Running time: 134 mins
- Country: Bangladesh
- Language: Bangla

Sundori is a 1979 Bangladeshi feature film directed by Amjad Hossain. The film won Bangladesh National Film Award in 8 categories including Best Supporting Actor, Best Supporting Actress, Best Music Director, Best Lyrics, Best Male Playback Singer, Best Female Playback Singer, Best Cinematography and Best Dialogue.

== Cast ==
- Bobita as Sundori
- Ilias Kanchan as Kanchan
- Saifuddin Ahmed
- Anwar Hossain
- Anwara Begum
- Jashim as Iman Ali

== Awards ==
Bangladesh National Film Awards

- Bangladesh National Film Award for Best Supporting Actor
- Bangladesh National Film Award for Best Supporting Actress
- Bangladesh National Film Award for Best Music Director
- Bangladesh National Film Award for Best Lyrics
- Bangladesh National Film Award for Best Male Playback Singer
- Bangladesh National Film Award for Best Female Playback Singer
- Bangladesh National Film Award for Best Dialogue
