= Alauddin Ali =

Bangladeshi music composer (1952–2020)

- আলাউদ্দিন আলী
- Born: 24 December 1952; Munshiganj District, East Bengal, Dominion of Pakistan
- Died: 9 August 2020 (aged 67); Dhaka, Bangladesh
- Occupations: Music director and composer
- Children: 5
- Relatives: Dhir Ali Miah (paternal cousin), Ali Akbar Rupu (first cousin once removed), Shawkat Ali Emon (brother-in-law), Abida Sultana (sister-in-law), Kazi Faisal Ahmed (son-in-law)
- Awards: full list

Alauddin Ali (24 December 1952 – 9 August 2020) was a Bangladeshi music composer. He won the Bangladesh National Film Award for Best Music Director eight times for the films Golapi Ekhon Traine (1978), Sundori (1979), Koshai (1980), Jogajog (1988) and Lakhe Ekta (1990). He won the Best Music Composer award for the film Laal Doriya (2002) and the Best Lyrics award for Premik (1985). Moreover, he won the Ifad Film Club Award and the Bachsas Award in the category of Best Music Director. He directed music for more than 300 films.

== Early life and background ==
Alauddin Ali was born on 24 December 1952 in the Banshbari village of Tongibari Upazila of the Munshiganj District. His father was Ustad Jadab Ali and his mother's name was Johra Khatun.

Ali's father was a staff artiste at the Dhaka radio station. His uncle, Sadek Ali, and cousins Dhir Ali Miah, Mansur Ali, Yunus Ali and Momotaz Uddin, were music directors and composers there during the 1960s. His first cousin-once removed Ali Akbar Rupu, son of his cousin Mansur Ali, was also a renowned music director of Bangladesh.

At the age of one year and six months, Alauddin Ali moved with his family to AGB Colony, Motijheel, Dhaka. This talented artist grew up in that colony with three brothers and two sisters. His first hand in music was with his younger uncle Sadek Ali. Later in 1986 he entered the film world as a musician. He started as an associate of Shaheed Altaf Mahmud and later worked with renowned composer Anwar Pervez for a long time.

== Career ==
In 1964, Ali won the 'All Pakistan Children's Award' for violin from the then president Ayub Khan as a child musician. By 1967–68, besides practicing violin, he learnt the piano under music director Karim Shahabuddin. He worked under eminent music composers like Khan Ataur Rahman, Altaf Mahmud and Robin Ghosh.

In 1968, Ali joined as a film instrumentalist and assistant to composer Altaf Mahmud. Ali made his debut as a music composer through the country song O Amar Bangla Maa Tor. Ali's first film as a music director was Shondhikkhon (1975). In 1978, Ali made his breakthrough by composing songs for the film Golapi Ekhon Traine. He composed two songs "Achen Amar Moktar" and "Haire Kopal Mondo, Chokh Thakite Ondho" for that film. Another film named Fakir Majnu Shah was released in the same year. The songs Premer Agune, Sobai Bole Boyosh Bare and Chokher Nojor Emni Koira were composed by Ali.

"The audience response after conducting the music for the first film was not very good. The film did not do well commercially. I did not regret it. But through the film Golapi Ekhon Traine, it is as if I am riding on the train of success. Whatever I have done since then, the audience has given me two hands, loved me."

— Alauddin Ali, Prothom Alo

During his career he recorded several songs in Dhaka, Kolkata, Mumbai, Lahore and Karachi. He worked for His Master's Voice in India in the 80's. A reputed French music company has included the background scores for the movie Surja Dighal Bari, composed by Alauddin Ali, in the curriculum of several music schools. He has also directed music for the film Padma Nadir Majhi directed by renowned director Goutam Ghose. He was the music director for the South Asian Games Ceremony in 1993 at Bangabandhu National Stadium, where over 8000 artistes sang to his tune.

He started an organization called 'LCS' on his own initiative, which works to protect artists ’royalties. Moreover, he also founded a production company called 'Ektara Multimedia Production' where various works related to music are done. The name of his music studio was Sruti.

== Personal life ==
Ali was married three times. With Monowara Begum, he has three children - Afrin Ali, Ajmeri Ali Minu and Showkat Ali Rana. With Nazrul Sangeet singer Salma Sultana (d. 2016), he has a daughter Alif Alauddin, who is also a singer and media personality like her parents.

Until his death, Ali had lived in Banasree, Dhaka with his wife Farzana Ali Mimi, a singer and youngest daughter, Adrita Alauddin Rajkonna.

== Interview ==
- আমার মতো ভাগ্যবান সুরকার কম : আলাউদ্দিন আলী. NTV online (Interview) (in Bengali). Interviewed by Nishith Surjo. 2015-06-08. Archived from the original on 2020-08-10.
- "Newsic - Alauddin Ali (আলাউদ্দিন আলী)". ATN News (Interview) (in Bengali). Interviewed by Nishith Surjo & Akhi Bhadra. 2016-09-18.
- "Igloo Taroka Kathon - Alauddin Ali". Channel i (Interview) (in Bengali). Interviewed by Dilruba Sathi. 2018-12-25.
- "Ganer Utshob - A Tribute to Alauddin Ali". Channel i (Interview) (in Bengali). Interviewed by Moushumi Barua.

== Notable songs ==
The number of songs composed by him is more than 5 thousand. In his career of more than four decades, he directed for playback songs of an average of 10 films every year. Some of the notable songs of Alauddin Ali are:

- Premer Agune
- Chokher Nojor Emni Koira
- Sukhe Thako, O Amar Nandini, Hoye Karo Ghoroni
- Surjodoye Tumi Surjasteo Tumi
- Bondhu Tin Din Tor Barit Gelam
- Sagarika
- Ekbar Jodi Keu Bhalobashto
- Barir Loke Koy
- Istishoner Rail Garita
- Ei Duniya Ekhon Toh Aar Sei Duniya Nai
- O Amar Bangla Maa Tor Aakul Kora
- Hoy Jodi Bodnam Hok Aro
- Amar Moto Eto Shukhi
- Jetuku Somoy Tumi Thako Kache
- Dukkho Bhalobeshe Premer Khela Khelte Hoy
- Prothom Bangladesh Amar Sesh Bangladesh
- Emon O toh Prem Hoy, Chokher Jole Kotha Koy
- Sobai Bole Boyos Bare Ami Boli Kome Re
- Amar Gethe Dao Na Maago, Ekta Polash Phool Er Mala
- Achen Amar Moktar, Achen Amar Barrister
- Haire Kopal Mondo, Chokh Thakite Ondho
- Shoto Jonomer Shopno Tumi Amar Jibone Ele
- Keu Kono Din Amare Toh Kotha Dilo Na
- Pari Na Bhule Jete, Sriti Ra Mala Gethe
- Jonmo Theke Jolchi Maago
- E Jibon Tomake Dilam Bondhu
- Amar Moner Bhetor Onek Jala Agun Hoiya Jole
- Je Chilo Drishtir Shimanay
- Bhalobasha Joto Boro Jibon Toto Boro Noy
- Tumi To Ager Moto Royesho Moner Moto
- O matir manush Ohonkare Ondho Hoye Korli Jare Hela

== Awards ==
S/N	Name of Award / Honour	Years	Category	For the Movie / Work	Note
1	All Pakistan Children's Award	1964	Best Children Artist as a Violinist	N/A	Won
2	Grand celebrations of 300th anniversary of Kolkata, held in Salt Lake Stadium	1990	N/A		Accorded a reception
3	National Film Awards (Bangladesh)	1985	Best Lyricist	Premik (1985)	Won
4	National Film Awards (Bangladesh)	1978	Best Music Director	Golapi Ekhon Traine (1978)	Won
4	National Film Awards (Bangladesh)	1979	Best Music Director	Sundori (1979)	Won
4	National Film Awards (Bangladesh)	1980	Best Music Director	Koshai (1980)	Won
4	National Film Awards (Bangladesh)	1988	Best Music Director	Jogajog (1988)	Won
4	National Film Awards (Bangladesh)	1990	Best Music Director	Lakhe Ekta (1990)	Won
5	National Film Awards (Bangladesh)	2002	Best Music Composer	Laal Doriya (2002)	Won
6	Ifad Film Club Award	2012	Best Music Director	N/A	Won
7	39th Bachsas Awards	2013	Best Music Director	Golapi Ekhon Bilatey (2010)	Won
8	Ananda Binodon Star Awards 2014 (Note: The sources indicate that Alauddin Ali received an award in category of Lifetime Achievement, given by a cultural organization 'Shuvechchha Sangskritik Forum'. The awards given by this organization is known as 'Ananda Binodon Star Award'. Although the name of the award was not mentioned in the news link of Alauddin Ali, it had been mentioned in the news link of Suchanda.)	2014	Lifetime Achievement	Awarded for the contribution in music for the years 2003 -2014	Received
9	Shaheed Altaf Mahmud Padak	2015	N/A	Awarded for outstanding contributions to the music	Received
10	SCB-The Daily Star "Celebrating Life"	2015	Lifetime Achievement	Awarded for monumental contributions to Music	Won
11	12th Channel i Music Awards	2017	Special Honour	N/A	Received

== Death ==
Ali had been suffering from pneumonia and blood infection for a long time. Alauddin Ali was first taken to Bangkok on 3 July 2015. After examination there, it was found that he had a tumor in his lung. Then he underwent treatment for cancer along with other physical problems. Earlier, he was admitted to hospital on several occasions. For a long time he was suffering from respiratory problems. He was treated in Bangladesh and Bangkok. He also been received treatment at the Center for Rehabilitation of the Paralyzed in Savar for a long period. When his physical condition deteriorated, he was admitted to Universal Medical College Hospital in Mohakhali. Considering the situation, he was given life support. Ali died at 5:50 pm on 9 August 2020. He was 67. He was buried at Mirpur Martyred Intellectuals Graveyard in Dhaka on 10 August 2020.
