= Golapi Ekhon Traine =

1978 film by Amjad Hossain

- Golapi Ekhon Traine Poster
- গোলাপী এখন ট্রেনে
- Directed by: Amjad Hossain
- Written by: Amjad Hossain
- Produced by: Amjad Hossain
- Starring: Farooque; Bobita; Anawar Hossain; Rosy Samad; Tarana Halim; Rawshan Jamil; A.T.M. Shamsuzzaman
- Cinematography: Rafiqul Bari Chowdhury
- Edited by: Enamul Haque
- Music by: Alauddin Ali
- Distributed by: Shukla Films
- Release date: September 5, 1978
- Running time: 114 min
- Country: Bangladesh
- Language: Bengali
- Budget: est. ৳5 lakh
- Box office: est.৳1 crore (US$81,000)

Golapi Ekhon Traine (Bengali: গোলাপী এখন ট্রেনে, romanized: Gōlāpī Ekhon Trēnē, lit. 'Golapi is now on a train' - English name: The Endless Trail) is a Bangladeshi drama film based on the novel of Amjad Hossain Droupodi Ekhon Traine and directed by himself. The film is one of his "Golapi" film series. This film was released on September 5, 1978 and became popular and had positive critical receptions.

== Plot ==
Mondol is an influential person in the village. His son, Milon, likes the daughter of a street singer Golapi. Mondol brings a marriage proposal for Golapi but the groom's family demand dowry in the form of a bicycle. Golapi's father cannot afford it so Milon pays for the cycle. The marriage does not take place, unfortunately, and Golapi's father commits suicide. As a result, Golapi's family fall further into poverty and she starts to work various jobs on the trains. The people from the village do not take this positively and try to stop her from working on the trains.

== Cast ==
- Bobita - Golapi
- Farooque - Milon
- Anwar Hossain - Golapi's Father
- Rosy Samad - Golapi's Mother
- Anwara - Moina
- Tarana Halim - Alapi
- Rawshan Jamil - Buri
- A.T.M. Shamsuzzaman - Mondol
- Abdullah al Mamun - Manik
- Teli Samad - Bonga

== Soundtrack ==
The music of this film was directed by Alauddin Ali and lyrics were penned by Tahera Haque, Moniruzzaman Monir, Mohammad Moniruzzaman, Gazi Mazharul Anwar and Amjad Hossain. Syed Abdul Hadi, Sabina Yasmin and other popular singers sang in this film.

Track	Singer(s)	Lyrics	Music director
Achen Amar Muktar	Syed Abdul Hadi	Gazi Mazharul Anwar and Amjad Hossain	Alauddin Ali
Hayre Kopal Mondo	Sabina Yasmin	Tahera Haque, Moniruzzaman Monir, Mohammad Moniruzzaman, Gazi Mazharul Anwar and Amjad Hossain	Alauddin Ali

== Awards ==
National Film Awards

- Golapi Ekhon Traine made history winning 9 awards out of 16 including Best Film, Best Director, Best Music Director, Best Actor in a Supporting Role, Best Actress in a Supporting Role, Best Lyrics, Best Male Playback Singer, Best Screenplay and Best Cinematography (Color).
- Amjad Hossain made a unique record of achieving 4 National Awards in the same year including Best Film (Producer), Best Director, Best Screenplay and Best Lyricist.

== See also ==
- Golapi (franchise)
