= Masud Karim =

Bangladeshi lyricist

মাসুদ করিম
- Born: Masud Karim; February 17, 1936; Kushtia, Khulna, Bangladesh
- Died: November 16, 1996 (aged 60); Montreal, Canada
- Occupations: Lyricist, film producer
- Years active: 1955–1996
- Notable work: Rajanigandha (1982)
- Spouse: Dilara Alo
- Parents: Rejaul Karilm (father); Nahar (mother)
- Awards: National Film Awards (2nd time)

Masud Karim (17 February 1936 – 16 November 1996) was a Bangladeshi lyricist. He won Bangladesh National Film Award for Best Lyrics twice for the film Rajanigandha (1982) and Hridoy Theke Hridoy (1994).

== Filmography ==
=== Film ===
Year	Film	Composer	Notes
1965	Rupban	Satya Saha	
1970	Madhu Milon	Bashir Ahmed	
	Yea Kore Bia	Amir Ali	
1977	Jadur Bashi	Azad Rahman	
1982	Rajanigandha	Alom Khan	
1982	Dui Poisar Alta	Alauddin Ali	
1983	Lalu Bhulu	Subal Das	
	Putrobodhu	Subal Das	
	Wayada	Subal Das	
	Anurag	Subal Das	
	Jaannat Dojokh	A Hamid	Urdu Film
	Bisorjon	Subal Das	
	Priyo Tumi	Alauddin Ali	
1985	Mahanayok	Sheikh Sadi Khan	
1985	Ramer Somoti	Monsur Ahmed	
1988	Agomon	Alauddin Ali	
1989	Bathar Daan	Ali Hossain	
1994	Hridoy Therke Hridoy	Alauddin Ali	
1994	Denmohor	Alauddin Ali	
1996	Sotter Mrittu Nei	Alauddin Ali	

=== Album ===
Song Title	Lyricist	Singers
"Duti Chokhe Chokh Rekhe"	Subal Das	Ferdausi Rahman
"Jokhon Thambe Kolahol"	Subal Das	Runa Laila
"Jonak Jonak Raat"	Karim Sahabuddin	Dilara Alo
"Tandra Hara Noyon Amar"	Samar Das	Hasina Momtaz
"Shilpi Ami Tomader e Gaan Shonabo"	Subal Das	Runa Laila
"Nei Miswaser Amar"	Alauddin Ali	Usha Uthup
"Mone Ki Pore Ekdin Amio Chilam"		M A Shoyeb
"Mon To Noy R Ayna"	Khandaker Nurul Alam	Fauzia Yasmin
"Jadi Neel Sagorer Mukto Tumi Chao"		Anwar Uddin Khan
"Kichu Bolo Kichu Bolo"		Syed Abdul Hadi
"Batashe Tomar Sanglap Shuni"		Mahmudun Nabi
"Oi Akash Ghire Sandha Name Rater Avvashe"	Raja Hossain Khan	Shahnaz Rahmatullah
