= Subal Das discography =

Subal Das (1928–2005) was a Bangladeshi music director. He has scored music for 92 films. The following is a list of films he scored:

== 1950s ==
Year	Film	Notes
1959	Akash Aar Mati	debut film

== 1960s ==
Year	Film	Notes
1963	Preet Na Jaane Reet	Urdu film
1965	Kajal	Urdu film
1965	Saat Rang	Urdu film
1966	Indhan	Urdu film
1967	Alibaba	Urdu film
1969	Bhanumoti	
1969	Kangan	Urdu film
1969	Pyasa	Urdu film

== 1970s ==
Year	Film	Notes
1970	Dorpochurno	
1970	Jog Biyog	
1970	Swaralipi	
1970	Tansen	Urdu/Bengali (bilingual film)
1971	Jalte Suraj Ke Neeche	Urdu film
1972	Erao Manush	
1973	Durdanto Durbar	
1973	Ekhane Akash Neel	
1974	Anek Din Aage	Winner: Bachsas Award for Best Music Director
1974	Shesh Theke Shuru	
1975	Abhagi	
1975	Alo Tumi Aleya	
1975	Anek Prem Anek Jwala	
1975	Dakpeon	
1975	Hasi Kanna	
1975	Upohar	
1977	Ujjol Surjer Niche	
1978	Achena Atithi	
1979	Anurag	
1979	Bulbul-e-Baghdad	
1979	Rajmohol	
1979	Shishnaag	
1979	Shohor Theke Dure	
1979	Waada	

== 1980s ==
Year	Film	Notes
1980	Akheri Nishan	
1980	Alif Laila	
1980	Kalankini	
1980	Rajkonya	
1980	Rajnondini	
1981	Bhalo Manush	
1981	Bhanga Gora	
1981	Ghoroni	
1981	Putrabadhu	
1981	Sultana Daku	
1982	Chitkar	
1982	Modhumoti	
1982	Rajsinghason	
1982	Soudagor	
1983	Abe Hayat	
1983	Goli Theke Rajpoth	
1983	Hasan Tarek	
1983	Jhumur	
1983	Lalu Bhulu	
1983	Maa Baap	
1983	Teen Bahadur	
1984	Josh	
1984	Norom Gorom	
1984	Porbot	
1984	Zalim	
1985	Andaj	
1985	Berohom	
1985	Morjina	
1985	Nokol Shahzada	
1985	Raj Kopal	
1986	Bishkonnar Prem	
1986	Chondraboti	
1986	Mayer Dabi	
1986	Shiri Farhad	
1986	Tala Chabi	
1986	Talukdar	
1988	Alibaba Chollish Chor	
1988	Hushiyar	
1988	Sukher Shopno	
1989	Alomoti Premkumar	
1989	Khelar Sathi	
1989	Laila Amar Laila	
1989	Ranga Bhabi	
1989	Sonar Songsar	

== 1990s ==
Year	Film	Notes
1990	Abodan	
1990	Bobby	
1990	Goriber Bou	
1990	Omor Akbor	
1990	Prayoshchitto	
1991	Shishmohol	
1992	Andho Biswas	
1993	Abujh Sontan	
1993	Shesh Upohar	
1994	Sotiner Songsar	
1995	Anjuman	
1995	Shilpi	

== 2000s ==
Year	Film	Notes

== 2010s ==
Year	Film	Notes

== Year unknown ==
Film	Notes
Dosh Geramer Morol	
Somrat	
Khamosh	

== Background score only ==
Year	Film	Composer	Notes
Osru Diye Lekha	Ali Hossain		

== Non-film albums ==
Year	Album	Songs	Lyricist	Artist

== As lyricist ==
Year	Film	Composer(s)	Notes
