= Azad Rahman discography =

Azad Rahman (1944–2020) was a Bangladeshi music director of Indian origin. He scored music for more than 36 films. The following is a list of films he scored:

== 1960s ==
Year	Film	Notes
1967	Miss Priyambada	Indian film composed along with Subir Sen
1969	Agantuk	

== 1970s ==
Year	Film	Notes
1973	Priyotoma	
1973	Raater Por Din	
1974	Masud Rana	also penned lyrics for one but all the songs
1975	Bandi Theke Begum	also penned lyrics
1975	Mastan	
1975	Epar Opar	sang a song "Bhalobashar Mulyo Koto"
1976	Agun	
1976	Dasyu Bonhur	
1976	Mayar Badhon	
1977	Jadur Bashi	Winner: Bangladesh National Film Award for Best Music Director
1977	Kuasha	
1977	Moti Mohol	
1977	Ononto Prem	
1978	Dumurer Phul	Winner: Bachsas Award for Best Music Director
1978	Gopon Kotha	he was the director
1978	Pagla Raja	
1978	Toofan	
1979	Aaina	
1979	Rajbondi	
1979	Songini	
1979	The Father	

== 1980s ==
Year	Film	Notes
1981	Allah Meherban	
1981	Lagam	
1981	Nobabjadi	
1982	Chand Suruj	
1982	Rajbari	
1983	Notun Bou	
1984	Dweep Konna	
1986	Dui Noyon	also wrote lyrics
1987	Mouchor	
1987	Shikol	
1987	Shoshi Punno	

== 1990s ==
Year	Film	Notes
1993	Chandabaj	Winner: Bangladesh National Film Award for Best Music Director
1994	Desh Premik	composed along with Ahmed Imtiaz Bulbul

== 2000s ==
Year	Film	Notes

== 2010s ==
Year	Film	Notes

== 2020s ==
Year	Film	Notes

== Year unknown ==
Film	Notes
Protarok	

== Background score only ==
Year	Film	Composer	Notes

== Non-film albums ==
Year	Album	Songs	Lyricist	Artist

== As lyricist ==
Year	Film	Composer(s)	Notes
1974	Masud Rana	himself	
1975	Bandi Theke Begum		
1977	Ononto Prem		
1978	Dumurer Phul		
1978	Toofan		
1986	Dui Noyon	himself	
