= Bangladesh National Film Award for Best Editing =

Bangladesh National Film Award for Best Editing বাংলাদেশ জাতীয় চলচ্চিত্র পুরস্কার শ্রেষ্ঠ চিত্রসম্পাদক
- Awarded for: For the contribution of Bangladeshi cinema in Editing category
- Location: Dhaka
- Country: Bangladesh
- Presented by: President of Bangladesh
- First award: 1977 (For the 1976 film)
- Final award: 2017 (For the 2015 film)
- Currently held by: Mehedi Rony (Bapjaner Bioscope)
- Website: Official website

The Bangladesh National Film Award for Best Editing (Bengali: বাংলাদেশ জাতীয় চলচ্চিত্র পুরস্কার শ্রেষ্ঠ চিত্রসম্পাদক) is one of the highest film awards in Bangladesh. Since 1977, the awards are given in the category of best Editing. The first award winner was Bashir Hossain. Mujibur Rahman Dulu was awarded 8 times and Aminul Islam Mintu was awarded 4 times.

== List of winners ==
=== 1970s ===
Year	Editing	Film	Notes
1976	Bashir Hossain	Matir Maya	
1977	Bashir Hossain	Simana Periye	
1978	Nurunnabi	Dumurer Ful	
1979	Saidul Anam Tutul	Surja Dighal Bari	

=== 1980s ===
Year	Editing	Film	Notes
1980	Badal Rahman	Emiler Goenda Bahini	
1981	No award		
1982	Awkat Hossain	Dui Poisar Alta	
1983	No award		
1984	Mujibur Rahman Dulu	Bhat De	
1985	Mujibur Rahman Dulu	Tin Kannya	
1986	Aminul Islam Mintu	Aghat	
1987	Aminul Islam Mintu	Opekkha	
1988	Atikur Rahman Mallik	Dui Jibon	
1989	Mujibur Rahman Dulu	Satya Mithya	

=== 1990s ===
Year	Editing	Film	Notes
1990	Aminul Islam Mintu; Jinnat Hossain	Goriber Bou; Biplab	
1991	Mujibur Rahman Dulu	Pita Mata Santan	
1992	Saiful Islam	Trash	
1993	Mujibur Rahman Dulu	Banglar Badhu	
1994	Jinnat Hossain	Commander	
1995	Atikur Rahman Mallik	Anya Jibon	
1996	Aminul Islam Mintu	Ajante	
1997	No award		
1998	No award		
1999	No award		

=== 2000s ===
Year	Editing	Film	Notes
2000	Sujon Mahmud	Kittonkhola	
2001	Mujibur Rahman Dulu	Meghla Akash	
2002	Mujibur Rahman Dulu	Itihas	
2003	No award		
2004	Junaid Halim	Shankhonad	
2005	No award		
2006	Saiful Islam	Ghani	
2007	Arghyakamal Mitra	Aha!	
2008	Md. Shahidul Haque	Ki Jadu Korila	
2009	Junaid Halim	Britter Baire	

=== 2010s ===
Year	Editing	Films	Notes
2010	Mujibur Rahman Dulu	Abujh Bou	
2011	Samir Ahmed	Guerrilla	
2012	Salimullah Sally	Ghetuputra Komola	
2013	Shariful Islam Russel	Mrittika Maya	
2014	Touhid Hossain Chowdhury	Desha: The Leader	
2015	Mehedi Haque Rony	Bapjaner Bioscope	
2016	Iqbal Ahsanul Karim	Aynabaji	
2017	Not given		
2018	Tarik Hossain Bidyut	Putro	
2019	Junaid Halim	Maya: The Lost Mother	

== Statistics ==
=== Winner more than once ===
8 times

- Mujibur Rahman Dulu

4 times

- Aminul Islam Mintu

3 times

- Junaid Halim

2 times

- Bashir Hossain
- Atikur Rahman Mallick
- Jinnat Hossain
- Saiful Islam
