= Khoshnur Alamgir =

Bangladeshi writer, film producer, lyricist and poet

- খোশনূর আলমগীর
- Born: 1955 (age 70–71); Bangladesh
- Occupations: poet, film lyricist.
- Years active: 1987–present
- Notable work: Jhumka (1981); Khotipuron (1989); Goriber Bou (1990)
- Spouse: Alamgir (1972–1999) (divorced)
- Children: Akhi Alamgir Tasveer Ahmed

Khoshnur Alamgir is a Bangladeshi lyricist, poet and novelist. She has written lyrics in films like Dayi Ke? (1987), Goriber Bou (1990), Banglar Bodhu (1993) etc.

== Early life ==
Khoshnur was born to popular writer Jobaida Khatun (1923–2016). So from very young age, she started writing poems.

== Career ==
Khoshnur started her career as a poet. While studying in class five, she started her poetic career upon writing in newspapers and magazines like 'Daily Ittefaq', 'Daily Bangla' and 'Sampan'. Later, she started writing songs for films. She was given the first break by composer Alam Khan in the film Jhumka (1981). She penned the song "Bicharpotir Bichar Hobe", which was sung by Sabina Yasmin and Syed Abdul Hadi. The song became popular and there was no looking back for her. In 1989, she wrote three hit songs in Khotipuron film – " Ei Duti Chhotto Haat", "Ei Poth Choli Eka" and "E Je Darun Jaala", the latter was sung by Runa Laila and the other two songs were sung by Andrew Kishore. She went on to write more than 500 songs in various films. Apart from films, she has written songs for albums. She has written around 25 songs that were sung by her daughter Akhi Alamgir. She wrote the title song of Akhi's studio Album Tomar Kachhe, composed by Shawkat Ali Emon.

As a writer, she has written more than 55 books in child literature, poetry and novels. She founded a national organisation of poets named Anupras. In 1993, director Sohanur Rahman Sohan was in search of a fresh actor for his upcoming film Keyamat Theke Keyamat, lyricist Khoshnur recommended little-known model Salman Shah to him. After the film's release, Salman Shah became a star.

== Personal life ==
Khoshnur married Alamgir in 1973. They have a daughter, Akhi Alamgir who was born on 19 January 1974. Akhi Alamgir is a prominent singer and earned National Film Award for Best Female Playback Singer in 2018. Alamgir and Khoshnur divorced in 1999 and he went on to marry singer Runa Laila that year.

== Filmography ==
=== Lyricist ===
- Jhumka (1981)
- Dayi Ke? (1987)
- Khotipuron (1989)
- Bouma (1989)
- Danga Fasaad (1990)
- Andho Biswas (1992)
- Mayer Ashirbad (1993)
- Mayer Dowa (1993)
- Abujh Sontan (1993)
- Chandni Raate (1993)
- Nirmom (1996)

=== Producer ===
- Nishpap (1986)
- Khotipuron (1989)
- Bouma (1989)
- Khoma (1992)
- Mayer Dowa (1993)
- Nach Nagina Nach (1993)
