= Khurshid Alam =

Bangladeshi playback singer

Md. Khurshid Alam মোঃ খুরশিদ আলম
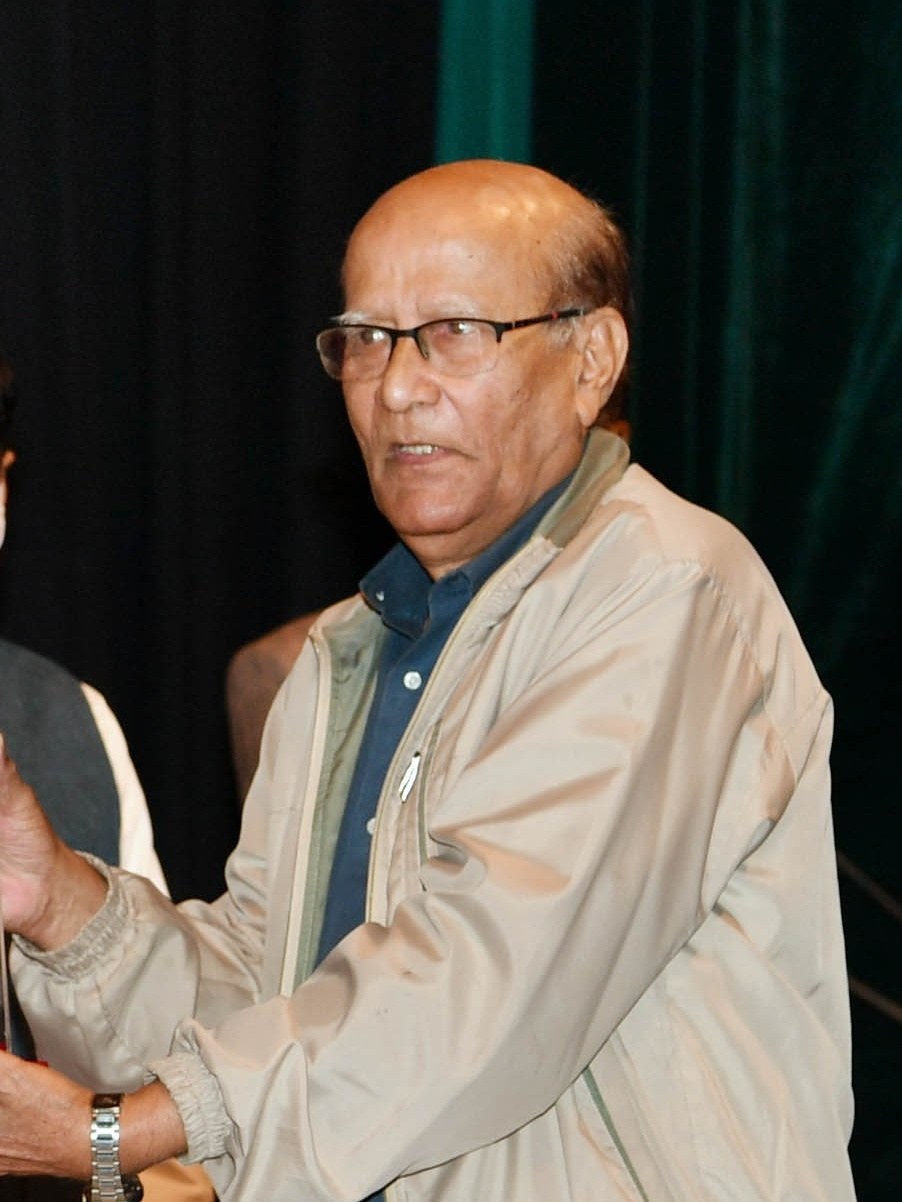

Background information
- Born: August 1, 1945 (age 80); Old Dhaka
- Genre: vocals
- Occupation: Playback singer

Md. Khurshid Alam (born 1 August 1945) is a Bangladeshi playback singer. His notable songs include Chumki Choleche Eka Pothe, Bondi Pakhir Moto, Maa Go Maa, Miss Lanka, Ajke Na Hoi Bhalobasho, Dheere Dheere Chol Ghora, Chupi Chupi Bolo Keu Jeney Jabe and Jodi Bou Shajo Go. His career has spanned more than four decades, in which he sang over 300 songs. He was conferred the Ekushey Padak from the Government of Bangladesh in 2018 and the Lifetime Achievement Award at the 12th Channel i Music Awards (2017) for his contribution to Bangladeshi film music. He also received the Lifetime Achievement Award at the Gaan e Gaan e Gunijon Shongbordhona, by Citibank NA in 2019.

== Early life ==
Alam originated from Joypurhat District. He was born in Old Dhaka. His uncle, Abu Haider Sazedur Rahman, was a lyricist. At the 1961–62 Education Week in the then East Pakistan, Alam had won the first prize in Rabindra Sangeet.

== Career ==
As of 2014, Alam sang over 300 playback songs under the guidance of the composers including Subal Das, Ali Hossain, Azad Rahman, Alauddin Ali, Alam Khan, Robin Ghosh and Satya Shaha.

Alam debuted in playback singing for the film Agantuk in 1969.

== Filmography ==
Films

- Agantuk (1969)
- Manusher Mon (1972)
- Ononto Prem (1977)
- Jadur Bashi (1977)
- The Father (1979)
- Dui Poisar Alta (1982)
- Lalu Bhulu (1983)
- Beder Meye Josna (1989)

== Awards ==
- Ekushey Padak (2018)
- Lifetime Achievement Award at the 12th Channel i Music Awards (2017)
- Lifetime Achievement Award, Gaan e Gaan e Gunijon Shongbordhona, Citibank NA, Bangladesh (2019)
