= Aghat =

Bangladeshi film

- Directed by: Mojibur Rahman
- Screenplay by: Mojibur Rahman
- Starring: Alamgir; Rojina; Golam Mustafa; Rosy Afsari
- Music by: Alauddin Ali
- Release date: 15 August 1986
- Country: Bangladesh
- Language: Bengali

Aghat is a 1986 Bangladeshi film starring Alamgir, Rojina and Rosy Afsari in the lead roles. The film was released on 15 August 1986. The film earned Best Editor's Award in 11th Bangladesh National Film Awards.

== Cast ==
- Alamgir - Masood
- Rozina - Mitu
- Prabir Mitra - Rashed
- Golam Mustafa - Masud's father
- Rosie Afsari - mother of Mitu and Rashed
- Anwar Hossain - Master Saheb
- Sadeq Bachchu
- Black Anwar
- Akhtar Hossain
- Syed Akhtar Ali

== Music ==
The film's music has been composed by Alauddin Ali.

No.	Title	singer(s)	Length
1.	"Maa Go Aaj Theke Mone Rekho"	chorus
2.	"Cholchhe Ekhon"	N/A
3.	"Ekta Chhotto Kothar Golpo"	Andrew Kishore
4.	"Na Hoilam Nayika"	Andrew Kishore and Sabina Yasmin

== Accolades ==
Awards	Category	Nominated Person	Result	Ref.
Bangladesh National Film Awards	Bangladesh National Film Award for Best Editing	Mujibur Rahman Dulu	Won	
