= Mayer Dabi =

Bangladeshi film

- YouTube version poster
- Directed by: Awkat Hossain
- Screenplay by: Awkat Hossain
- Starring: Bulbul Ahmed; Selina; Rosy Afsari; Prabir Mitra; Black Anwar
- Edited by: Aokat Hossain
- Music by: Subal Das
- Release date: 10 January 1986
- Country: Bangladesh
- Language: Bengali

Mayer Dabi is a 1986 Bangladeshi drama film directed by Awkat Hossain. It stars Bulbul Ahmed, Selina, Rosy Afsari, Prabir Mitra, Black Anwar and others. The film earned Best Child Artist Award at the 11th Bangladesh National Film Awards. It is one of the fewest Bangladeshi films made on mother alongside Mayer Kanna (1986), Mayer Morjada, Mayer Ashirbad (1993), Hangor Nodi Grenade (1997), Ammajan (1999), Matritto (2003) etc.

== Cast ==
- Bulbul Ahmed
- Selina
- Rosy Afsari
- Prabir Mitra
- Black Anwar

== Music ==
Subal Das has directed the music for the movie. The songs are penned by M A Malek and sung by Sabina Yasmin, Andrew Kishore, Runa Laila, Rathindranath Roy, Pranab Kumar and Nasreen Reza.

- "Dine Dine Khoka Amar" - Runa Laila
- "Prothom Jedin Dekha Holo" - Sabina Yasmin
- "Raate Amar Bodhua" - Sabina Yasmin and Andrew Kishore
- "Notun Ek Othiti Esechhe Ghore" - Sabina Yasmin and Rathindranath Roy
- N/A - Pranab Kumar and Nasreeb Reza

== Rewards ==
11th National Film Awards

- Winner: Best Child Artist - Kamrunnahar Azad Swapna
