= Ali Hossain discography =

Ali Hossain (1940-2021) was a Bangladeshi music director. He has composed music for 46 films. The following is a list of films he scored:

== 1960s ==
Year	Film	Notes
1965	Mala	
1966	Daak Babu	
1966	Daak Bangla	Bengali/Urdu bilingual film
1967	Chhotey Sahib	Bengali/Urdu bilingual film
1967	Qulli	Urdu film
1968	Rup Kumari	
1969	Anari	Bengali/Urdu bilingual film
1969	Daag	Urdu
1969	Notun Naame Dako	

== 1970s ==
Year	Film	Notes
1970	Adhikar	
1970	Ekoi Onge Koto Rup	
1970	Payel	Bengali/Urdu bilingual film
1972	Chowdhury Bari	
1972	Osru Diye Lekha	
1975	Aponjon	
1975	Badshah	
1975	Jibon Niye Jua	
1977	Daata Hatem Tai	
1978	Anari	
1978	Angaar	
1978	Sohag	
1979	Bijoyini Sonavan	
1979	Ghar Sansar	
1979	Iman	

== 1980s ==
Year	Film	Notes
1980	Amir Fokir	
1980	Bourani	
1980	Chondrolekha	
1981	Raja Saheb	
1982	Alta Banu	
1982	Nalish	
1989	Byathar Daan	Winner: Bangladesh National Film Award for Best Music Director
1989	Sonar Nao Poboner Boitha	

== 1990s ==
Year	Film	Notes
1990	Amar Songi	
1990	Apon Ghor	
1991	Rajar Meye Bedeni	
1992	Mastan Raja	
1993	Mayer Ashirbad	
1994	Abolombon	
1994	Kaliya	
1994	Sneho	
1995	Shilpi	composed one song "Ke Jaane Kotodure"
1997	Tiger	
1998	Tejjo Putro	
1999	Ziddi	

== 2000s ==
Year	Film	Notes
2002	Juari	

== Year unknown ==
Film	Notes
Atonko	
Bhondo Premik	
Dhon Doulot	
Usila	
