= Traas =

1992 film by Kazi Hayat

- Bengali: ত্রাস
- Directed by: Kazi Hayat
- Written by: Kazi Hayat
- Starring: Manna; Kabita; Rajib; Dildar; Shuchorita; Kabila; Bulbul Ahmed; Ashish Kumar Louho; Mizu Ahmed; Lelin; Rebeka; Jacky Alamgir; Kala Aziz; Liton Akhtar
- Distributed by: Sultana Pictures LTD
- Release date: 1992

Traas (ত্রাস (lit. Terror): also pronounced as Traash) is a 1992 Bangladeshi political action-thriller film, starring Manna. Directed by Kazi Hayat, the film was a commercial and critical success and is remembered as one of the productions that helped establish Manna as a leading action hero in the Dhallywood film industry. It won four National Film Awards, including two personal awards for Hayat.

== Premise ==
Terrorists infiltrate educational institutions.

== Cast ==
- Manna
- Bulbul Ahmed
- Rajib
- Ashish Kumar Louho
- Dildar
- Mizu Ahmed

== Legacy ==
The film "exposed the arming of ruling-party groups under the guise of student politics and the resulting devastation of ordinary students' lives. The film is still regarded as one of the finest cinematic portrayals of student politics in Bangladesh."

== Accolades ==
The film received four awards at the National Film Awards

- Best Supporting Actor – Mizu Ahmed won
- Best Screenplay – Kazi Hayat won
- Best dialogue writer -- Kazi Hayat won
- Best Editing – Saiful Islam won
