= Ayesha Akter =

Bangladeshi film actress

Ayesha_Akter
- আয়েশা আক্তার
- Occupation: Actress
- Years active: –1995
- Awards: Bangladesh National Film Awards (1st time)

Ayesha Akter is a Bangladeshi film actress. She won the Bangladesh National Film Award for Best Supporting Actress for her role in the film Rajanigandha (1982).

== Filmography ==
- The Father (1979)
- Rajanigandha (1982)
- Nodir Naam Modhumoti
- Basaira (1984)Urdu

(1995)

== Awards ==
| Year | Award | Category | Film | Result |
|---|---|---|---|---|
| 1982 | National Film Awards | Best Supporting Actor | Rajanigandha | Won |
