= Jogajog (1988 film) =

Bangladeshi drama film

- Poster
- Directed by: Mainul Hossain
- Written by: Razaul Hasan (dialogues)
- Screenplay by: Mainul Hossain
- Story by: Razaul Hasan
- Starring: Razzak; Shabnam; Champa; Zafar Iqbal
- Cinematography: Tabibur Rahman
- Edited by: Mujibur Rahman Dulu
- Music by: Alauddin Ali
- Production company: Mukti Films
- Distributed by: Samaj
- Release date: 18 April 1988
- Running time: 141 minutes
- Country: Bangladesh
- Language: Bengali

Jogajog is a 1988 Bangladeshi drama film directed by Mainul Hossain. The film's screenplay was written by Mainul Hossain with a story and dialogues by Rezaul Hasan. The film was produced by Mukti Films and released under the banner of Samaj. It stars Razzak, Shabnam, Champa, Zafar Iqbal, Prabir Mitra, Sunetra and Rajib in the lead roles.

The film Samaksha was released in Bangladesh on 8 April 1988. Razzak won the 13th Bangladesh National Film Awards for Best Actor for his performance as Shahed Chowdhury, while Alauddin Ali won the Best Music Director and Mofizul Haque won the Best Sounds Editor in the film.

== Plot ==
Shahed Chowdhury is a tea garden official. He likes Julekha the first time he sees her and takes her marriage proposal to her father. Julekha's father agrees to his proposal and gets them married. Shahed and Julekha have a daughter named Keya. Seeing that Shahed spends all day alone in the house and garden, his wife Julekha asks him to go to a club party. One day, Shahed takes Julekha to a club. Unable to mingle with the club members, Shahed calls Julekha a fool and illiterate, and this incident deteriorates their relationship. Shahed gets drunk at home. Fed up with this, Julekha takes her daughter Keya to her father's house.

Keya is now a young woman. She comes to her new workplace with her mother. There she meets Zafar Chowdhury, a new employee at the tea plantation. A love affair develops between them. A plantation employee, Golap Singh alias Tila Babu, tempts Zafar in various ways to go astray. Under the supervision of Shahed Chowdhury, he develops improved varieties of tea leaves in the plantation. But Rajiv, another plantation employee, is unhappy with this. He wants to use Tila Babu to turn their success into failure. Tila Babu's several attempts fail.

One day, while Keya was walking through the tea garden, a beer can thrown by Shahed Chowdhury hit her on the head. Shahed apologized to her and gave her his handkerchief to stop the bleeding. Keya's mother was worried when she saw the injury on her head. Keya came to Shahed's bungalow the next day to return her handkerchief and they had a conversation. From there, Keya asked her mother about her father. Julekha came to the bungalow and met Shahed. Zafar was there and Keya found out about her father's true identity. Meanwhile, Shahed threatened and obstructed her work when Golap Singh was looting the garden on Rajiv's orders. Rajiv was angry and took Keya away. But Zafar rescued her and revealed her father's identity. Shahed came there and handed Rajib over to the police and Shaheed's family was reunited.

== Cast ==
- Razzak - Shahed Chowdhury
- Shabnam - Julekha Chowdhury
- Champa - Keya Chowdhury
- Zafar Iqbal - Zafar Chowdhury
- Prabir Mitra - Dr. Rafiq
- Sunetra - Veena
- Rajib - Rajib
- Shawkat Akbar - Lashkar
- ATM Shamsuzzaman - Tila Babu
- Narayan Chakraborty - Care's father
- Shamsuddin Kayes
- Maya Hazarika
- JinnahAmir - Jinnah
- Suruj Bengali - Suruj
- Abdul Aziz
- Bobby
- Idris
- Satya Narayan

== Music ==
The music and lyrics of the song for the film "Jogajog" are composed by Alauddin Ali. The lyrics of songs are written by Gazi Mazharul Anwar. The songs are sung by Sabina Yasmin, Andrew Kishore, Runa Laila, Syed Abdul Hadi, Kumar Bishwajit and Shamima Yasmin Diba.

== Award ==
National Film Awards- 1988

- Won: Best Film Actor - Abdur Razzak
- Won: Best Music Director - Alauddin Ali
- Won: Best Sounds Editor- Mofizul Haque
