= Ekhono Onek Raat =

- Movie poster
- Bengali: এখনো অনেক রাত
- Directed by: Khan Ataur Rahman
- Screenplay by: Khan Ataur Rahman
- Starring: Farooque; Shuchorita; Bobita
- Music by: Khan Ataur Rahman
- Release date: 12 December 1997
- Country: Bangladesh
- Language: Bengali

Akhono Onek Raat is a 1997 Bangladeshi film directed by Khan Ataur Rahman and starring Bangladeshi actors Farida Akhtar Babita, Farooque and Shuchorita. Khan Ataur Rahman earned both Best Music and Best Lyricist Award at Bangladeshi National Film Awards with this film.

== Awards ==
22nd Bangladesh National Film Awards

- Best Music Director - Khan Ataur Rahman
- Best Lyricist - Khan Ataur Rahman
