= Atikur Rahman Mallik =

Bangladeshi film editor

Atikur Rahman
- আতিকুর রহমান
- Born: Mymensingh, Bangladesh
- Died: 30 March 2017; Dhaka, Bangladesh
- Occupation: Film editor
- Years active: 1976–2021
- Notable work: Anya Jibon; Dui Jibon
- Awards: National Film Award (2nd times)

Atikur Rahman Mallik is a Bangladeshi film editor. He won Bangladesh National Film Award for Best Editing twice for the film Dui Jibon (1988) and Anya Jibon (1995).

== Selected films ==
- Megher Onek Rong - 1976
- Asha - 1983
- Puroshkar - 1983
- Lalu Bhulu - 1983
- Noyoner Alo - 1984
- Miss Lolita - 1985
- Gunai Bibi - 1985
- Harano Sur - 1987
- Rajlokkhi Srikanto -1987
- Dui Jibon - 1987
- Sajano Bagan - 1990
- Ghar Amar Ghar - 1990
- Bhai Bhai - 1990
- Chandni Raatey - 1993
- Aguner Poroshmoni - 1994
- Shopner Thikana - 1995
- Anya Jibon - 1995
- Priyojon - 1996
- Srabon Megher Din - 2000
- Uttarer Khep - 2000
- Dui Duari - 2001
- Hason Raja - 2002
- Chandrokotha - 2003
- Megher Pore Megh - 2004
- Ek Khondo Jomi - 2004
- Shyamol Chhaya - 2004
- Shasti - 2004
- Shuvaa - 2006

== Awards and nominations ==
National Film Awards

Year	Award	Category	Film	Result
1988	National Film Award	Best Editing	Dui Jibon	Won
1995	National Film Award	Best Editing	Anya Jibon	Won
