= Goriber Bou =

Bangladeshi social drama film

- Poster
- Bengali: গরীবের বউ
- Directed by: Kamal Ahmed
- Produced by: Shabana
- Starring: Shabana; Alamgir; Manna; Aruna Biswas; Anwara Begum
- Cinematography: Reza Latif
- Edited by: Aminul Islam Mintu
- Music by: Subal Das
- Production company: S.S. Productions
- Release date: 1990
- Country: Bangladesh
- Language: Bengali

Goriber Bou (Bengali: গরীবের বউ; transl. Wife of a Poor Man) is a 1990 Bangladeshi social-drama film directed by Kamal Ahmed. Renowned film actress Shabana produced the film under her own banner S.S. Productions. The film stars Alamgir, Shabana, Manna, Aruna Biswas in the leading role and more.

At the 15th Bangladesh National Film Awards, it won Best Film, Best Director, Best Male Playback Singer (for Syed Abdul Hadi), Best Cinematography, and Best Editing (jointly).

== Cast ==
- Alamgir
- Shabana
- Manna
- Aruna Biswas
- Anwara Begum

== Music ==
Goriber Bou films music is directed by Subal Das. Song written by Masud Karim. Sung by Sabina Yasmin, Andrew Kishore, Runa Laila.

=== Soundtrack ===
No.	Title	Artist(s)	Artists on screen	Length
1	Peyechi Tore Amari Buke	Runa Laila	Anwara Begum	03:47
2	A Jibone Tumi Ogo Ele	Sabina Yasmin & Syed Abdul Hadi	Shabana, Alamgir	4:45
3	Ami Vaggotake Gorbo Nijei	Andrew Kishore	Alamgir	4:42
4	Amar Jibone Tumi Sukher Jharna	Sabina Yasmin	Shabana, Alamgir	3:38
5	Premer Haowa Legese Gaye	Runa Laila & Andrew Kishore	Manna, Aruna Biswas	4:11
6	Amar Prane Tomar Bashi	Sabina Yasmin	Shabana, Alamgir	

== Awards ==
Goriber Bou won the following awards:

Year	Award Title	Category	Awardee	Result
1990	National Film Awards	Best Film	S.S. Productions (producer)	Won
1990	National Film Awards	Best Director	Kamal Ahmed	Won
1990	National Film Awards	Best Male Playback Singer	Syed Abdul Hadi	Won
1990	National Film Awards	Best Cinematography	Reza Latif	Won
1990	National Film Awards	Best Editing	Aminul Islam Mintu (jointly)	Won
