= Jinnat Hossain =

Bangladeshi film editor

- জিন্নাত হোসেন
- Occupation: Film editor
- Years active: 1988–Present
- Notable work: Satya Mithya; Commander
- Awards: National Film Award (2nd time)

Jinnat Hossain is a Bangladeshi film editor. He won a Bangladesh National Film Award for Best Editing twice for the films Satya Mithya (1990) and Commander (1994).

== Selected films ==
- Bir Purush - 1988
- Jadu Mahal - 1988
- Bojro Mushti - 1989
- Shontrash - 1991
- Top Rangbaaz - 1991
- Khoma - 1992
- Utthan Poton - 1992
- Sotorko Shoitan - 1993
- Ghatok - 1994
- Ghrina - 1994
- Commander - 1994
- Bishwapremik - 1995
- Ei Ghor Ei Songsar - 1995
- Chaowa Theke Paowa - 1996
- Amar Ontore Tumi - 1996
- Palabi Kothae - 1997
- Shopner Nayok - 1997
- Ononto Bhalobasa - 1999
- Mayer Samman - 2001
- Bichchu Bahini - 2001
- Shundori Bodhu - 2002
- Premer Taj Mahal - 2002
- Praner Manush - 2003
- Number One Shakib Khan - 2010
- Nissash Amar Tumi - 2010
- Don Number One - 2012
- Daring Lover - 2014
- Hero: The Superstar - 2014

== Awards and nominations ==
National Film Awards

| Year | Award | Category | Film | Result |
|---|---|---|---|---|
| 1990 | National Film Award | Best Editing | Satya Mithya | Won |
| 1994 | National Film Award | Best Editing | Commander | Won |
