= Razmoni =

Closed movie theatre in Bangladesh

- রাজমনি
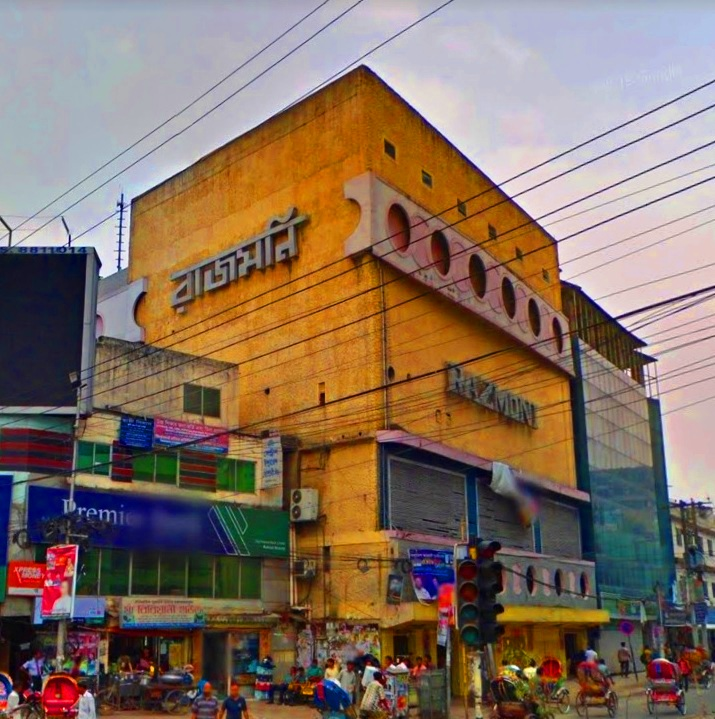
- Interactive map of Razmoni
- Full name: Razmoni
- Address: 67/1, VIP Road, Kakrail; Dhaka-1000
- Coordinates: 23.73705°N 90.408891°E
- Owner: Ahsanullah Moni
- Capacity: 1150
- Type: Movie theater
- Acreage: 24 Kathas

Construction
- Groundbreaking: 1982
- Opened: 3 March 1983
- Closed: 11 October 2019

Razmoni, a now defunct movie theater, known as Razmoni Cinema Hall, was one of the most famous in Dhaka City. It is located on VIP Road in Kakrail. Ahsanullah Moni built the Razmoni Theater in Kakrail in 1972 on 24 kathas of land. Another theater named Razia was built next to Razmoni under the same ownership. The 400-seater Razia Auditorium was smaller in size than Razmoni. In addition to the auditorium, the building housed a music and sound recording studio, an image recording studio, a dubbing studio, and an editing panel. Due to the slump in the film business and continued losses, the theater was slated to close in October 2019 and be converted into a commercial building.

== History ==
On March 3, 1983, this 1,150-seater theater was inaugurated for film screenings. The film 'Lalu Bhulu' directed by Kamal Ahmed was the first film screened in this theatre. In 1984, The building housed the offices of forty film production companies. Hence, the Kakrail area around this theater came to be known as 'Filmpara' in the eighties. The theater did the highest business in the 1990s. On October 11, 2019, after thirty-six years of activity, two theaters, Razmoni and Razia, were announced to be closed. Prior to their closure, the theaters screened 'Nolak'.

== Future plan ==
A nineteen to the twenty-two-story multi-purpose commercial building named 'Rajmoney Tower' is planned to be constructed at this site after demolishing the theatre. The tower is planned to have underground car parking, retail up to four floors, and the remaining floors to be rented to various offices. There are no plans to build a new modern film screen.
