= Reza Latif =

- Occupations: Film director, producer and cinematographer

Reza Latif is a Bangladeshi film director, producer, and cinematographer. He won Bangladesh National Film Award for Best Cinematography of the films Ononto Prem (1977) and Goriber Bou (1990). He has made 150 films since the early 1970s.

== Career ==
Latif first worked in the 1971 film Nacher Putul.

Latif made his directorial debut in 2010 by the film Ma Babar Shopno. His last directed film was Bhalobashar Shesh Nai.

== Works ==
Producer

- Chitkar (1984)
- Chotobou
- Attarakkha
- Atongkito Shotru

Director

- Ma Babar Shopno (2010)
- Bhalobashar Shesh Nai
