= Shamsuddin Togor =

Bangladeshi film director

- Born: c. 1944
- Died: 23 July 2012 (aged 68)
- Occupation: Film Director

Shamsuddin Togor (1944 – 23 July 2012) was a Bangladeshi film director.

== Biography ==
Togor's first direction was Dosyu Bonhur. Anjana made her debut in the silver screen with this film.

Togor also directed films like Akheri Nishan and Banjaran. These films are selected for preservation in Bangladesh Film Archive.

Togor died on 23 July 2012 at the age of 68.

== Selected filmography ==
- Kar Bou (1966)
- Dosyu Bonhur (1976)
- Maheshkhalir Baanke (1978)
- Akheri Nishan (1980)
- Dokhol (1982)
- Hur-e-Arab (1980)
- Banjaran (1983)
- Goli Theke Rajpoth (1983)
- Somrat (1984)
- Raj Bhikhari (1985)
- Nokol Shahzada (1985)
- Soti Komola (1986)
- Rotonmala
