= Ekti Cinemar Golpo =

2018 Bangladeshi film

- Theatrical poster
- Directed by: Alamgir
- Screenplay by: Alamgir
- Produced by: Icon Entertainment
- Starring: Alamgir; Arifin Shuvoo; Rituparna Sengupta; Champa; Sadek Bachchu; Saberi Alam; Jannatul Ferdoush Peya
- Music by: Emon Saha; Shawkat Ali Emon; Runa Laila; S. I. Tutul
- Distributed by: Icon Entertainment
- Release date: 13 April 2018
- Country: Bangladesh
- Language: Bengali

Ekti Cinemar Golpo (Bengali: একটি সিনেমার গল্প, lit. 'Story of a film') is a 2018 Bangladeshi film starring Indian actress Rituparna Sengupta and Bangladeshi stars Alamgir, Champa and Arifin Shuvoo. Alamgir produced and directed the film. The film was released on 13 April 2018. This movie is about the people involved with the film industry. The story revolves around a film director, his actress wife, and an aspiring actor.

== Cast ==
- Alamgir as Akash
- Arifin Shuvoo as Sajib
- Rituparna Sengupta as Kabita Banerjee
- Champa as Mitali
- Chand as Mita, the child artist
- Syed Hasan Imam as Dr. Sumon Chowdhury
- Sadek Bachchu
- Saberi Alam
- Wahida Mollick Jolly
- Boby
- Jacky Alamgir
- Dr. Sohel Babu

== Soundtrack ==
Track listing
| No. | Title | Lyrics | Music | Singer(s) | Length |
|---|---|---|---|---|---|
| 1. | "Ami Dubai Jabo, Hawai Garitey" | Moniruzzaman Monir | Shawkat Ali Emon | Monir Khan, Konal |
| 2. | "Tumi Acho Taai" | Kabir Bakul | S. I. Tutul | S. I. Tutul, Ankhi Alamgir |
| 3. | "Golpo Kotha" | Gazi Mazharul Anwar | Runa Laila | Ankhi Alamgir |
| 4. | "Ei Noyon Kandbe Nato Aar" | Gazi Mazharul Anwar | Emon Saha | Jhilik |
| 5. | "Amar Porano Jaha Chay" | Rabindranath Tagore | Emon Saha | Aditi Mohsin, Bappa Mazumder, Ankhi Alamgir |
