= Bashir Hossain =

Bangladeshi film editor and director (1934–1978)

- বশির হোসেন
- Born: 22 November 1934; Comilla, East Bengal, British India
- Died: 23 April 1978 (aged 43); Dhaka, Bangladesh
- Occupation: Film editor
- Years active: 1959–1977
- Notable work: Lathial; Simana Periye
- Awards: National Film Award (3rd times)

Bashir Hossain is a Bangladeshi film editor and director. He won the Bangladesh National Film Award for Best Editing three consecutive times, for the films Lathial (1975), Matir Maya (1976), and Simana Periye (1977). Although best known as an editor, he also directed the 1966 film 13 Number Feku Ostagar Lane.

== Selected films ==
- Ei Desh Tomar Amar - 1959
- Rajdhanir Buke - 1961
- Harano Din - 1961
- Surja Snan - 1962
- Chanda - 1962
- Dharapat - 1963
- Talash - 1963
- Yeh Bhi Ek Kahani - 1964
- Megh Bhanda Rodh - 1964
- Bandhan - 1964
- Milan - 1964
- Anek Diner Chena - 1964
- Dui Diganta - 1964
- Godhulir Prem - 1965
- Kaise Kahun - 1965
- Rupban - 1965
- Sat Rang - 1965
- Jana Jani - 1965
- Begana - 1966
- 13 Number Feku Ostagar Lane - 1966
- Nawab Sirajuddaula - 1967
- Oporajeo - 1967
- Uljhan - 1967
- Nayantara - 1967
- Sat Bhai Chompa - 1967
- Tum Mere Ho - 1968
- Soye Nadia Jage Pani - 1968
- Eto Tuku Asha - 1968
- Maina Moti - 1969
- Nil Akasher Niche - 1969
- Molua - 1969
- Joar Bhata - 1969

== Awards and nominations ==
National Film Awards

Year	Award	Category	Film	Result
1975	National Film Award	Best Editing	Lathial	Won
1976	National Film Award	Best Editing	Matir Maya	Won
1977	National Film Award	Best Editing	Simana Periye	Won
