= Kamal Ahmed (director) =

Bangladeshi film director and actor

- কামাল আহমেদ
- Born: Kamal Ahmed; 7 February 1935 (age 91); Kushtia, Bengal Presidency, British India
- Occupations: Film director, actor
- Years active: 1966–1993
- Notable work: Lalu Bhulu; Goriber Bou
- Awards: National Film Awards

Kamal Ahmed (born 7 February 1935) is a Bangladeshi film director and actor. He won the Bangladesh National Film Award for Best Director twice, for the films Lalu Bhulu (1983) and Goriber Bou (1990).

== Filmography ==
- Ujala (1966)
- Parwana (1966)
- Roop Kumari (1968)
- Abanchhita (1969)
- Osru Diye Lekha (1972)
- Anirban (1973)
- Uphar (1975)
- Angar (1977)
- Anurag (1979)
- Bhanga Gora (1981)
- Rajanigandha (1982)
- Lalu Bhulu (1983)
- Awara (1985)
- Ma o Chhele (1985)
- Byathar Daan (1989)
- Goriber Bou (1990)
- Abujh Sontan (1993)
- Raja Babu (1998)
