= Ankhi Alamgir =

Bangladeshi singer and actress (born 1975)

- আঁখি আলমগীর
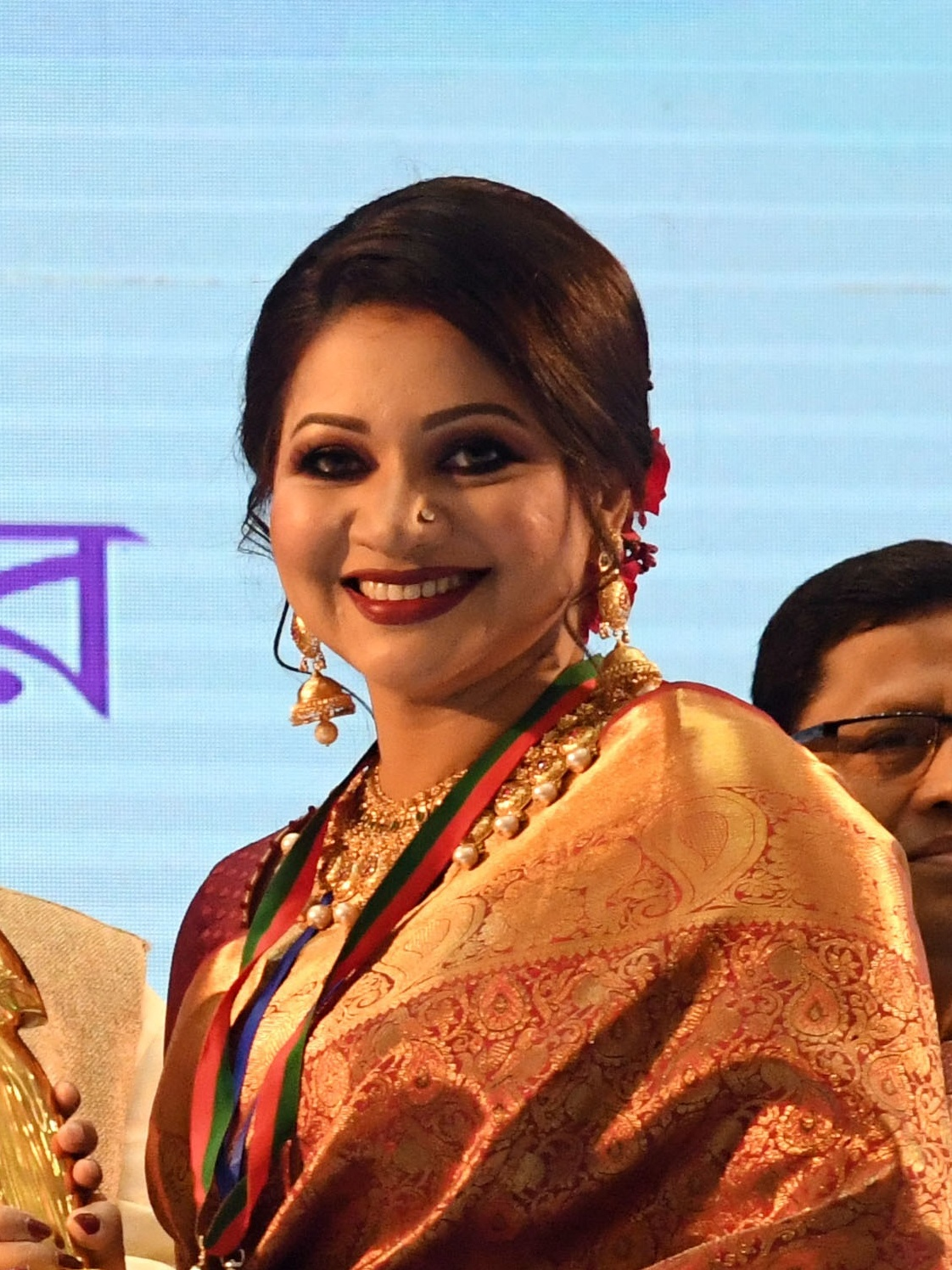
- Alamgir receiving National Film Award (2019)
- Born: 7 January 1975 (age 51)
- Occupations: Actor, singer
- Children: 2
- Parents: Alamgir (father); Khoshnur Alamgir (mother)

Ankhi Alamgir (born 7 January 1975) is a Bangladeshi singer and actress. She won the Bangladesh National Film Award for Best Child Artist for her performance in the film Bhat De (1984) and Best Female Playback Singer for the film Ekti Cinemar Golpo (2018). As of 2016, she has released 18 albums. She is the daughter of actor-director Alamgir.

== Early life and education ==
She was born on 7 January 1975 in Dhaka. She comes from a well-known artistic family. Her father, Alamgir is a prominent Bangladeshi actor and director, and her mother, Khoshnur Alamgir, is a lyricist. Growing up in a culturally rich environment, she was exposed to music and performing arts from an early age.

Alamgir began learning music while she was still in school. She received formal training in classical music from an early age. Her first music teacher was Ustad Akhtar Sadmani, and later she continued her training under Sanjib De. This early guidance played an important role in shaping her musical skills and career.

Alongside her artistic training, Ankhi Alamgir completed her general education in Dhaka. After finishing her graduation, she briefly enrolled in a law program (LL.B), although she did not complete the degree, as she became more focused on her professional career in music and entertainment.

== Career ==
Alamgir debuted singing playback in 1994. Her first album was launched in 1997 and the second one, titled Bisher Kata in 1998.

Alamgir emceed a reality television show Power Voice.

Alamgir returned to acting as an adult through a television drama serial in mid-2010. She performed as a guest actor in the film Ek Cup Cha (2014).

== Awards ==
National Award recipient as “Best Child Artist” in 1984, which was awarded by President of Bangladesh. National Award recipient as “Best Female Singer” in 2018, which was awarded by the Prime Minister of Bangladesh. Bangladesh Film Journalist Organizations’ ‘‘Best Female Playback Singer’’ in the years 2000, 2005 and 2018.
