= Awkat Hossain =

Bangladeshi film editor, writer and director

- আওকাত হোসেন
- Born: 3 May 1951 (age 74); Dhaka, Pakistan
- Occupation(s): Film editor, writer, director
- Years active: 1970–1992
- Notable work: Dui Poisar Alta
- Awards: National Film Award (1st time)

Awkat Hossain is a Bangladeshi film editor, writer and director. He won Bangladesh National Film Award for Best Editing for the film Dui Poisar Alta (1982)

== Filmography ==
=== As a writer ===
- Mayer Dabi – 1986
- Bondhu Amar – 1992

=== As a director ===
- Mayer Dabi – 1986
- Bondhu Amar – 1992

=== As editors ===
- Bandi Theke Begum - 1975
- Jonmo Theke Jolchi - 1981
- Nalish - 1982
- Dui Poysar Alta - 1982
- Mayer Dabi - 1986
- Bondhu Amar - 1992

== Awards and nominations ==
National Film Awards

Year	Award	Category	Film	Result
1982	National Film Award	Best Editing	Dui Poisar Alta	Won
