= 13th Bangladesh National Film Awards =

National Film Awards, Bangladesh

- Awarded for: Best of Bangladeshi cinema in 1988
- Awarded by: President of Bangladesh
- Presented by: Ministry of Information
- Presented on: 1989
- Site: Dhaka, Bangladesh
- Official website: www.moi.gov.bd

Highlights
- Best Feature Film: Dui Jibon
- Best Actor: Nayok Raj Razzak; Jogajog
- Best Actress: Rozina; Jibondhara
- Most awards: Dui Jibon (6)

The 13th Bangladesh National Film Awards were presented by the Ministry of Information, Bangladesh to felicitate the best of Bangladeshi cinema released in the year 1988. The ceremony took place in Dhaka in 1988 and awards were given by then president of Bangladesh. The National Film Awards are the only film awards given by the government itself. Every year, a national panel appointed by the government selects the winning entry, and the award ceremony is held in Dhaka. 1988 was the 13th National Film Awards.

== List of winners ==
This year awards were given in 17 categories. Awards for Best Male Playback Singer was not given in 1988.

=== Merit awards ===
Name of Awards	Winner(s)	Film
Best Film	Suchana Films (Producer)	Dui Jibon
Best Director	Abdullah al Mamun	Dui Jibon
Best Actor	Abdur Razzak	Jogajog
Best Actress	Rozina	Jibondhara
Best Actor in a Supporting Role	Wasimul Bari Rajib	Heeramati
Best Actress in a supporting role	Suborna Shirin	Biraj Bou
Best Child Artist	Master Tushar	Agaman
Best Music Director	Alauddin Ali	Jogajog
Best Sounds Editor	Mofizul Haque	Jogajog
Best Lyrics	Moniruzzaman Monir	Dui Jibon
Best Female Playback Singer	Sabina Yasmin	Dui Jibon

=== Technical awards ===
Name of Awards	Winner(s)	Film
Best Screenplay	Abdullah al Mamun	Dui Jibon
Best Cinematographer (Color)	Rafiqul Bari Chowdhury	Heeramati
Best Art Director	Abdul Khalek	Agaman
Best Sound Editing	Mafizul Haque	Jogajog
Best Editing	Atiqur Rahman Mollik	Dui Jibon

=== Special awards ===
- Best Child Artist (Special) - Baby Joya (Bheja Chokh)
- Special Award - Firoza Rahman Tina (posthumous)

== See also ==
- Bachsas Film Awards
- Meril Prothom Alo Awards
- Ifad Film Club Award
- Babisas Award
