= Aay Khuku Aay (song) =

1976 song by Hemanta Mukherjee and Sravanti Mazumdar

Song by Hemanta Mukhopadhyay and Sravanti Mazumdar
- Language: Bengali
- English title: Come to me, daughter
- Released: 1976
- Studio: His Master's Voice, Kolkata
- Length: 5:06
- Label: Saregama
- Composer: V. Balsara
- Lyricist: Pulak Bandyopadhyay
- Producer: Saregama

Music video
- "Aay Khuku Aay" on YouTube

"Aay Khuku Aay" is a Bengali-language song by Indian singer Hemanta Mukhopadhyay and Sravanti Mazumdar. Released in 1976, the song was written by Pulak Bandyopadhyay and composed by V. Balsara.

Mazumdar gained recognition from Hemanta as she had contact with his son Jayant Mukherjee. The song was originally written as an inclusion to her Puja album, but she wanted to sing it with Hemanta rather than solo. She, Bandyopadhyay and Balsara went to Mukhopadhyay's house, where they confirmed it. It was recorded in a studio of record label Saregama (His Master's Voice) in Kolkata. Although it was first appointed to Ranu Mukherjee, Balsara changed to Mazumdar as she had to leave for a tour.

Her audience suggested the song two years after its release, on which Mazumdar left several comments. With a theme of a daughter and a father, the song was sung by her during concerts. Later, it was used in the 1979 film The Father directed by Kazi Hayat. It was recreated by several singers. A film named after the song was released in 2022.

== Release, theme and sequel ==
Sravanti Mazumdar, one of the song's singers gained contact with singer Hemanta Mukhopadhyay through his son, Jayant Mukhopadhyay. "Aay Khuku Aay", which was written by lyricist Pulak Bandyopadhyay, was originally appointed to Ranu Mukherjee, Hemanta's daughter, and Hemanta himself. However, Ranu Mukherjee dropped out from the song as she had to go to a tour and V. Balsara, an associate of Sravanti Mazumdar, gave her the song to sing, and the song was officially released in 1976 under the label of Saregama. Sravanti Mazumdar later said that she was not informed that Ranu Mukherjee was originally in her place.

"Aay Khuku Aay" was originally written by Pulak Bandyopadhyay as a song for the Puja festivals album of her. One day, Bandyopadhyay asked him "Read this song once, how you like it." Mazumdar read the song lines multiple times after seeing it, which brought tears into her eyes from sadness. She suggested singing the song with Mukhopadhyay, not just solo. Bandyopadhyay became happy. Sometime later, she, Bandyopadhyay and Balsara went together to Mukhopadhyay's house, who liked the song.

Though Mazumdar performed frequent song concerts at the time, her audience did not bring up "Aay Khuku Aay" until two after its release. During the time, the song did not gain much promotion because the only method for promoting songs was Akashvani Radio, which was less frequently used in West Bengal. After the first suggestions by her audience of singing the song happened, she sang the song in every concert she attended, and it gradually became a favorite song. She commented on not being able to understand why many people cried after hearing the song, which Mazumdar later understood after her father died.

Mazumdar became sad when her audience did not suggest her to sing the song until two years from its official release. Colonel Bose, an associate of her from the recording studio said to her: "You have no idea how far this song would go. So don’t be disappointed." She commented on wishing that Pulak Bandyopadhyay, V. Balsara, Mukhopadhyay and Colonel Bose were with her when she sang. Later, she went to R. D. Barman to work with her songs, but he was not able to as he was leaving for a US tour with Asha Bhosle. He suggested her to Anu Malik. Mazumdar taught him Bengali as he did not know it. Pulak Bandyopadhyay wrote a sequel to "Aay Khuku Aay", titled "Jibonsathi khunjte giye pelam je go dujoner dekha", composed by Malik, which Mazumdar sang with Mahendra Kapoor.

ETV Bharat described the song as "a document of the affection of the father's heart and the nostalgia of the daughter surrounding him until her death".

== Legacy and popular culture ==
The digital platform Bengali Web Solution was scheduled to bring Sravanti Mazumdar to a concert at the Kala Mandir Auditorium on February 15, 2026. The music was to be also broadcast on radio. The show scheduled at 6:30 PM was put up to celebrate 50 years of the release of "Aay Khuku Aay" from 1976. Srikanto Acharya was set to collaborate with Mazumdar in the music.

"Aay Khuku Aay" was used in the 1979 film The Father directed by Bangladeshi film producer and director Kazi Hayat. By this use in the film, the song gained popularity both in West Bengal state, where it originated, of India and Bangladesh. Though the song was used in the film without prior permission, Mazumdar heard from actor Asaduzzaman Noor about its use.

The 2022 film Aay Khuku Aay was directed by Sauvik Kundu and produced by Jeetz Filmworks. The title track, also named "Aay Khuku Aay" was written, composed and sung by Ranajoy Bhattacharya, with Anindya Chatterjee also writing its lyrics. Bhattacharya spoke about his role in the song "There can be no greater credit for me than this. I am very excited about the film 'Aay Khuku Aay'. The song 'Aay Khuku Aay' is Bumba da's favorite and he has spoken about the song in many places [...]" According to Shubhodeep Banerjee of TheWall, writing the song was challenging for Bhattacharya because of Hemanta Mukherjee and Sravanti Mazumdar's existing song "Aay Khuku Aay". Bhattacharya lyrics and music was original, despite initial thought of inspiration from the old song.

Bangladeshi singer Asif Akbar and Rayna Ahmed sang a cover version of the song on September 27, 2021 and released it on the YouTube channel "Asif". It was produced and labeled by ARB Entertainment. The song's music was re-arranged by Shahid Rahman and the videography was directed by Yamin Elan. Ahmed remarked that she felt excited to sing the song with Akbar.
