= Tina Khan =

Bangladeshi actress

- টিনা খান
- Born: Firoza Rahman Tina; 25 May 1966; Chuadanga, East Pakistan, Pakistan
- Died: 20 January 1989 (aged 22)
- Occupations: Actress, film producer
- Spouse: Moazzem Hossain
- Children: 1
- Awards: 13th National Film Awards

Firoza Rahman Tina (known by her stage name Tina Khan; 25 May 1966 – 20 January 1989) was a Bangladeshi film actress and producer. She appeared in about 25 films. She was conferred special award posthumously on 13th National Film Awards in 1989.

== Background and career ==
Firoza Rahman Tina was born on 25 May 1966 in Chuadanga. She was married to Moazzem Hossain (d. 22 August 2021) when she was in class nine. Her daughter is actress Rimu Roja Khandakar (b. 1983).

After coming to Dhaka Khan joined the theatre group of Abdullah Al Mamun. She debuted in film career through the film "Biman Bala", directed by Ehtesham. She then went to work on films including "Rojonigondha", "Dui Jibon", "Mou Chor", "Ayna Bibir Pala", "Ekai Eksho", and "Lagam". She produced and acted in the film "Princess Tina Khan", released in 1985. The film was based on lives of Jatra artists.

== Death and legacy ==
Khan died in a road accident on 20 January 1989 while she was returning from the inauguration of a short film in Bogura. Director Alamgir Kabir, accompanying her in the same vehicle, also died from the accident.

Khan was conferred a special award posthumously in the 13th National Film Awards in 1989.

== Selected filmography ==
- Bimanbala
- Rajanigandha
- Mou Chor
- Ayna Bibir Pala
- Lagam
- Dui Jibon
- Eri Nam Prem
- Ekai Eksho
- Princess Tina Khan
