= Saiful Islam (film editor) =

Bangladeshi film editor

- সাইফুল ইসলাম
- Occupation: Film editor
- Years active: 1981–2006
- Notable work: Ghani
- Awards: National Film Award (1st time)

Saiful Islam is a Bangladeshi film editor. He won the Bangladesh National Film Award for Best Editing twice for the film Traas (1992) and Ghani (2006).

== Selected films ==
- Jonmo Theke Jolchi (assistant editor) - 1981
- Dui Poysar Alta (assistant editor) - 1982
- Ferari Bosonto (assistant editor) - 1982
- Bobby - 1990
- Dangga - 1991
- Traas - 1992
- Voyangkor Saat Din - 1993
- Deshpremik - 1994
- Love Story: Premer Golpo - 1995
- Shudhu Tumi - 1997
- Ghani - 2006

== Awards and nominations ==
National Film Awards

Year	Award	Category	Film	Result
1992	National Film Award	Best Editing	Traas	Won
2006	National Film Award	Best Editing	Ghani	Won
