= Parineeta (1986 film) =

Bangladeshi film

- Directed by: Alamgir Kabir
- Based on: Parineeta novel of Sarat Chandra Chattopadhyay
- Starring: Anjana Sultana; Ilias Kanchan; Ashish Kumar Louho
- Music by: Sheikh Sadi Khan
- Release date: 12 September 1986
- Country: Bangladesh
- Language: Bengali

Parineeta (English: The Bride) (Bengali: পরিনীতা) is a 1986 Bangladeshi film starring Ilias Kanchan and Anjana Sultana opposite him. Both the actor and the actress garnered Bangladesh National Film Awards. It won National Film Awards in three categories that year and Bachsas Awards in seven categories.

== Cast ==
- Ilias Kanchan
- Anjana Sultana

== Music ==
The film's music was composed by Sheikh Sadi Khan.

== Awards ==
Bangladesh National Film Awards

- Best Actor - Ilias Kanchan
- Best Actress - Anjana Sultana
- Best Supporting Actor - Ashish Kumar Louho

Bachsas Awards

- Best Film - Alamgir Kabir
- Best Director - Alamgir Kabir
- Best Actor - Ilias Kanchan
- Best Actress - Anjana Sultana
- Best Supporting Actor - Ashish Kumar Louho
- Best Female Playback Singer - Nilufar Yasmin
- Best Cinematographer - Maksudul Bari Chowdhury
