= Junaid Halim =

Bangladeshi film editor

- জুনায়েদ হালিম
- Occupations: Film editor and professor (Professor of Film and Television Studies at Jagannath University)
- Years active: 1993–Present
- Awards: full list

Junaid Halim is a Bangladeshi film actor and editor. He is also one of the renowned professors of film studies in Bangladesh. He was the chairman of the Film & TV department at Jagannath University, one of the reputed public universities in Bangladesh. He won Bangladesh National Film Award for Best Editing three times for the films Shankhonad (2004), Britter Baire (2009) and Maya: The Lost Mother (2019).

== Early life ==
Junaid Halim was born in Madhabdi municipality area in Narsingdi District under Dhaka division. His parents are late A. J. M Abdul Halim Mollah and late Rijia Halim.

== Education ==
Professor Junaid Halim obtained his honors and masters degrees from the Department of Mass Communication and Journalism at the University of Dhaka (1983–87). He later have flown to India to pursue his higher education at the Film and Television Institute, Pune and completed his Diploma in Cinema (Specialization in Editing) in (1995-1996). He returned to Dhaka later and joined as a lecturer of the Department of Mass Communication and Journalism at Jagannath University.

== Filmography ==
=== As an actor ===
- Shey – 1993
- Dub Satar – 2011

=== As an editor ===
- Shorot'71 – 2000
- Bachelor – 2004
- Shankhonad – 2005
- Rani Kuthir Baki Itihash – 2006
- Nirontor – 2006
- Swopnodanay – 2007
- Banshi – 2007
- Rupantor – 2008
- Britter Bairey – 2009
- Sohagi's Ornament – 2015

== Awards and nominations ==
National Film Awards

Year	Award	Category	Film	Result
2004	National Film Award	Best Editing	Shankhonad	Won
2009	National Film Award	Best Editing	Britter Baire	Won
2019	National Film Award	Best Editing	Maya: The Lost Mother	Won
