= Mujibur Rahman Dulu =

Bangladeshi film editor

- মুজিবুর রহমান দুলু
- Born: December 13, 1955
- Died: May 31, 2025 (aged 69)
- Occupation: Film editor

Mujibur Rahman Dulu was a Bangladeshi film editor. He won Bangladesh National Film Award for Best Editing eight times for the films Bhat De (1984), Teen Kannya (1985), Satya Mithya (1989), Pita Mata Santan (1991), Banglar Bodhu (1993), Meghla Akash (2001), Itihas (2002) and Abujh Bou (2010).

== Works ==
- Bhat De (1984)
- Teen Kannya (1985)
- Satya Mithya (1989)
- Pita Mata Santan (1991)
- Banglar Bodhu (1993)
- Meghla Akash (2001)
- Itihas (2002)
- Ayna (2006)
- Abujh Bou (2010)

== Death ==
He died on 31 May 2025 at Gonoshasthaya Nagar Hospital in Dhaka while undergoing treatment. He died around 12:30 PM. At the time of his death, he was 69 years old.
