= Sunetra =

Indian actress

- Born: Rina Sunetra Mandal; 9 July 1970
- Died: 20 April 2024 (aged 53)
- Education: Kolkata University
- Occupation: Actress
- Years active: 1983-2002
- Spouse: Suresh Kumar from 1997 India Samsul Haque Mohon(1988-1990 Bangladesh )

Sunetra (died 20 April 2024) was an Indian actress who worked in Bangladesh, India and Pakistan.

== Biography ==
Sunetra was born on 9 July 1970. She received MA degree from Kolkata University.

Sunetra made her debut in Dhallywood in 1985 with Usila where Zafar Iqbal was her co-star. She mainly acted in Dhallywood films. She acted in Tollywood too. She also acted in two Urdu films and Pakistani television dramas.

== Selected filmography ==
=== Dhallywood ===
- Usila (1985) by Momtaz Ali
- Boner Moto Bon by Dharasiku
- Vabir Songsar by Delowar Jahan Janthu
- Sadhona by MA Kasem
- Palki by Delowar Jahan Janthu
- Raja Mistri by Safiqul Islam
- Sukher Swapno by Awkat Hossain
- Mayer Izzot by Subash Shum
- Alal Dulal by Ibne Mizan
- Shuktara by Jillur Rahman
- Moshal by Bodrul Azam
- Kuchboron Konya Megh Boron kesh by Sahajan Akhando
- Bondhu Amar by Awkat Hossain
- Shimul Parul by Delowar Jahan Janthu
- Vai Amar Vai by Delowar Jahan Janthu
- Layla Amar Layla by MA Malek
- Dukhini MA by Delowar Jahan Janthu
- Bidhan by Hashmot
- Nache Nagin by Delwor Jahan Janthu
- Vul Bichar by Anjhan
- Sorporani by Dharasiku
- Bikrom by Al Masud
- Badsha Vai by Dara Sikhu
- Raja Joni by Fazal Ahmed Benzir
- Amar Songsar by Asukh Gosh
- Vai Bondhu by Awkat Hossain
- Ghor Vanga Ghor (1992) by Anutush Borua Chanchol
- Ogni Purush (1987) by Rayhan Mujib
- Moni Kanchon (1987) by Sowpon Chowdhury
- Santi(1989) by Bodrul Azam
- Mela(1987) by Motaher Uddin
- Ghorer Sukh by Nurul Haque Bassu
- Istirir Sawpno by Delowar Jahan Janthu
- Gowhroub by Bodrul AZAM
- Nirdoy by Sofiul AZAM
- Nil Dhoriya by F Kabir Chowdhury
- Jugajug by Moinul Hossain
- Target by Ruhul Amin
- KalaKhun (1989) by Dharasiku
- Chobol by Mukta Chowdhury
- Eki Rasta(1991) by Bimol Rana
- Amar Bondhon (1990) by Azizur Rahman

=== Tollywood ===
- Sithir Sidur (1996) by Anup Sengupta
- Monsa Konya (1997) by Sujit Guha
- Khelaghar (1999) by Probhat Roy
- Danob (1997) by Sachin Adhikari
- Sohodormini (1987) by Rama Prasad Chakraborty
- Drupodi TV Series (1999–2002) by osit Bondopadddy

=== Lollywood ===
- Talash(1990)
- Shunye Ki Talash (1987)
- Bangkok Kay Chor (1986)
- Ranjish (1993)
- Nagin Rani (1992)
- Disco Diwaney (1987)
