= Rajanigandha =

Bangladeshi film

- Poster
- Directed by: Kamal Ahmed
- Starring: Shabana; Razzak; Ayesha Akter; Alamgir; Tina Khan
- Music by: Alam Khan
- Release date: 14 October 1982
- Running time: 145 minutes
- Country: Bangladesh
- Language: Bengali

Rajanigandha (Bengali: রজনীগন্ধা) is a 1982 Bangladeshi film starring Razzak, Alamgir and Shabana opposite them. Ayesha Akter garnered a Bangladesh National Film Award for Best Supporting Actress for her performance in the film. Lyricist Masud Karim earned a Best Lyricist Award for "Rajnigandha Phuler Moto".

== Cast ==
- Shabana
- Razzak
- Alamgir
- Tina Khan
- Ayesha Akter

== Soundtrack ==
All music was composed by Alam Khan and lyrics were penned by Masud Karim.

No.	Title	Singer(s)	Length
1.	"O Mishti Bhabi"	Runa Laila
2.	"Ei Monta Jodi Chay"	Runa Laila
3.	"Tumi Amar Ami Tomar"	Runa Laila
4.	"Jodi Bhalobese Kache Ele"	Kaderi Kibria and Sabina Yasmin
5.	"Ami Rojonigondha Phuler Moto"	Sabina Yasmin

== Awards ==
Bangladesh National Film Awards

- Best Supporting Actress - Ayesha Akhtar
- Best Lyrics - Masud Karim
