= A J Mintu =

Bangladeshi film director

- এ জে মিন্টু
- Occupations: Film director and screenwriter

A J Mintu is a Bangladeshi film director and screenwriter. He won the Bangladesh National Film Award for Best Director four times and Best Screenplay twice for the films Lalu Mastan (1987), Satya Mithya (1989), Pita Mata Santan (1991), and Banglar Bodhu (1993).

== Education ==
Mintu studied at the Gopal Chandra Institution (GCI) High School in Pabna.

== Filmography ==
- Protigga (1980)
- Maan Somman (1983)
- Lalu Mastan (1987)
- Satya Mithya (1989)
- Pita Mata Santan (1991)
- Ashanti (1996)
- Banglar Bodhu (1993)
- Prothom Prem (1994)
- Baper Taka (1995)
- Shanti Chai (1996)
