= Anjana Sultana =

Bangladeshi film actress (1958–2025)

- অঞ্জনা সুলতানা
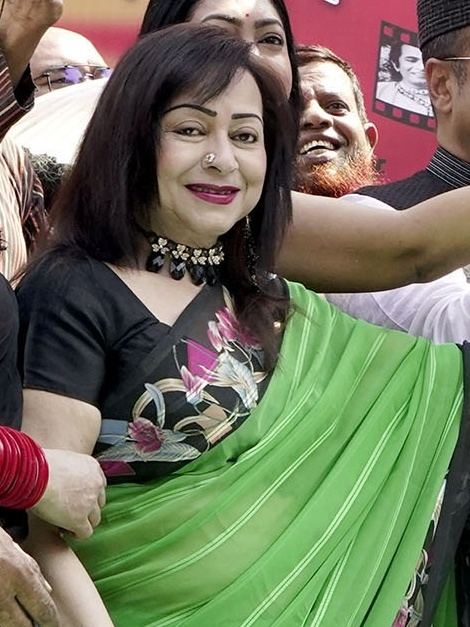
- Anjana Sultana at National Film Day celebration program on 3 April 2024.
- Born: 27 June 1958; Dhaka, East Pakistan, Pakistan
- Died: 4 January 2025 (aged 66); Dhaka, Bangladesh
- Occupation: Actress
- Spouse: Azizur Rahman Buli (Divorced)

Anjana Sultana (27 June 1958 – 4 January 2025) was a Bangladeshi film actress. She performed in more than 300 films. She won Bangladesh National Film Award for Best Actress for her role in the film Parineeta (1986).

== Early life ==
Sultana was born on 27 June 1958 and grew up in Dhaka in the then East Pakistan. From childhood, she would get invitations to dance on different stages of the country and abroad. At the age of nine, she caught the attention of actor Sohel Rana while performing dance at the then Iqbal Hall of the University of Dhaka. At the age of 14, she met him again in an event where he offered her to join the film industry.

== Career ==
Sultana made her acting debut in the film Shetu. Her first released film was Doshshu Bonhur (1976) directed by Shamsuddin Togor. She got her breakthrough in the film Matir Maya (1976).

Sultana paired with actor Razzak in 30 films including Ashikkhito (1978), Rajanigandha (1982), Ashar Alo (1982), Jinjir (1979), Anarkali, Bidhata (1989), Bourani, Sonar Horin, Mana, Ram Rahim John, Sanai, Sohag, Matir Putul, Shaheb Bibi Golam, and Obhijan (1984).

== Personal life and death ==
Sultana was married to producer-director Azizur Rahman Buli. During the marriage, she acted in two of his films, "Lalu Sardar" and "Nepali Meye". She served as the vice president of Manash, an anti-smoking organisation.

For ten days Sultana was admitted to the intensive care unit of a private hospital in an unconscious state. Upon detecting a blood infection, she was transferred to Bangabandhu Sheikh Mujib Medical University on 1 January 2025. She died there on 4 January, at the age of 59.

== Awards ==
Sultana was adorned with numerous national and international accolades, alongside several awards from various social and cultural organisations.

- Asia Continental Dance Competition - First Place (once)
- National Dance Competition - First Place (thrice)

=== National Film Awards ===
- Winner: Best Actress - Parineeta (1986)

=== Bachsas Awards ===
- Winner: Best Actress - Mohona (1983)
- Winner: Best Actress - Parineeta (1986)
- Winner: Best Actress - Ram Rahim Jon (1989)
