= Ashish Kumar Louho =

- আশীষ কুমার লোহ
- Born: 10 October 1937; Mymensingh, Bengal Presidency, British India
- Died: 4 November 1994 (aged 57)
- Occupations: Actor, playwright, dialogue writer, story writer

Ashish Kumar Louho (10 October 1937 – 4 November 1994) was a Bangladeshi film actor, playwright, dialogue writer and story writer. He won Bangladesh National Film Award for Best Supporting Actor for his role in the film Parineeta (1986).

== Career ==
Louho debuted his acting career through the film Harano Din.

Louho is best known for his role as Heera in the television series, Tri Rotno, broadcast by Bangladesh Television.

== Works ==
- Karwa
- Begana
- Bhaowal Shonyashi
- Kayse Kahu
- Nadi O Nari
- Sutorang (1964)
- Angar
- Achena Otithi
- Rupali Shoikatey
- Mouchor
- Shakhi Tumi Kar
- Kar Bou
- Apon Dulal
- Nayantara
- Anekdin Agey
- Duiparbo
- Badal
- Jonmo Theke Jolchhi
- Rajar Raja
- Pagla Raja
- Shohag Milon
- Ali Baba Chollish Chor
- Madhumaloti
- Shasti
- Gharey Bairey
- Parineeta (1986)
- Traas (1992)
