= Satya Mithya =

Bangladeshi film

- Poster
- সত্য মিথ্যা
- Directed by: A. J. Mintu
- Release date: 3 March 1989
- Country: Bangladesh
- Language: Bengali

Satya Mithya is a 1989 Bangladeshi film directed by A. J. Mintu. It won five Bangladesh National Film Awards in the Best Producer, Best Screenplay, Best Dialogue, Best Editing and Best Child Artist categories.

== Cast ==
- Shabana as Rabeya
- Alamgir as Raju Ahmed
- Anwar Hossain as Gofur
- Wasimul Bari Rajib as Amjad
- Golam Mustafa as Mr. Chowdhury
- Nuton as Rita Chowdhry
