= Aminul Islam Mintu =

Bangladeshi film editor (c.1939–2020)

- আমিনুল ইসলাম মিন্টু
- Born: c. 1939
- Died: 18 December 2020
- Occupation: Film editor
- Years active: 1965–2002
- Notable work: Goriber Bou; Ajante
- Awards: National Film Award (4 times)

Aminul Islam Mintu (c. 1939 – 18 December 2020) was a Bangladeshi film editor.

== Biography ==
In his career, he was awarded 4 times Bangladesh National Film Award for Best Editing for the film Aghat (1986), Opekkha (1987), Goriber Bou (1990), Ajante (1996).

Mintu died from COVID-19 on 19 December 2020, during the COVID-19 pandemic in Bangladesh.

== Selected films ==
- Mala - 1965
- Aakhri Station - 1965
- Chakori - 1967
- Chand Aur Chandni - 1968
- Pitch Dhala Path - 1968
- Daagh - 1969
- Bijli - 1969
- The Rain - 1976
- Ki Je Kori - 1976
- Jadur Bashi - 1977
- Sareng Bou - 1978
- Angaar - 1978
- Anuraag - 1979
- Jinjir (1979)
- Aradhona - 1979
- Rajanigandha - 1982
- Nantu Ghotok - 1982
- Chandon Diper Rajkonna - 1984
- Awara - 1985
- Didar - 1987
- Surrender - 1987
- Sondhi - 1987
- Opekkha - 1987
- Hisab Chai - 1988
- Bidhata - 1989
- Byathar Daan - 1989
- Nawab Sirajuddaula - 1989
- Ankhi Milon - 1990
- Mayer Doa - 1990
- Goriber Bou - 1990
- Dangga Fasaad - 1990
- Chorer Bou - 1992
- Ondho Prem - 1993
- Abujh Sontan - 1993
- Kaliya - 1994
- Banglar Nayok - 1995
- Shopner Prithibi - 1996
- Nirmom - 1996
- Ajante - 1996
- Praner Cheye Priyo - 1997
- Sagarika - 1998
- Kajer Meye - 1999
- Eri Naam Dosti - 2001
- Shwashurbari Zindabad - 2002

== Awards and nominations ==
National Film Awards

Year	Award	Category	Film	Result
1986	National Film Award	Best Editing	Aghat	Won
1987	National Film Award	Best Editing	Opekkha	Won
1990	National Film Award	Best Editing	Goriber Bou	Won
1996	National Film Award	Best Editing	Ajante	Won
