= Sravanti Mazumdar =

Indian singer and radio host

- Born: Darjeeling, West Bengal, India
- Origin: Dum Dum, Kolkata
- Occupations: Singer, actor, broadcaster
- Years active: 1970–present
- Label: Saregama
- Member of: Royal Over-Seas League
- Website: sravantimazumdar.com

Sravanti Mazumdar is an Indian singer, songwriter, radio broadcaster and television host commonly known for singing the song "Aay Khuku Aay" along with Hemanta Mukherjee. Starting singing from the age of five, she currently composes songs and sings residing in Isle of Man, United Kingdom. She is also known as "Radio Queen". Mazumdar sings and likes songs in pure Bengali. She took radio presentation as her passion and a career. She left West Bengal in 2015 and came back in 2019, from after that going to the Isle of Man.

== Early life and education ==
Sravanti Mazumdar was born and raised in Darjeeling, West Bengal. She developed an interest in music through listening to contemporary singers of the time on the radio and going to Indian classical music concerts. From five years old, she started learning classical music from Sri Sudhir Bandopadhyay, a disciple of Pandit Jnan Prakash Ghosh. Mazumdar was discouraged from joining musical concerts or singing outside until her master thought so. She listened secretly to songs by Hemanta Mukherjee, Sandhya Mukherjee, Manna Dey, Mohammad Rafi, Mukesh and other musical artists of the time. She also began listening to music of the Western world like jazz, country, blues and R&B and would sing them to her classmates. She studied in Kamala Girls' High School, in South Kolkata. Mazumdar was helped by her Anglo-Indian friends for some English song words that were difficult to understand.

== Musical career ==
The company Living Sound by Colonel Rabindranath Bose brought four songs composed by V. Balsara and written by Pulak Bandyopadhyay for Mazumdar to sing. Bose approached HMV (Saregama) for publishing the songs. The manager at that time, A. C. Sen liked all the songs and asked Mazumdar to sing them as HMV's puja release for that year. Mazumdar agreed to sing for HMV's puja the next year, as she had work with Bose. Sen asked Balsara and Bandyopadhyay to compose two songs for Ranu Mukherjee, the daughter of Hemanta Mukherjee. Their song "Bushy Ball" was released in 1969 puja. Mazumdar was asked and sung in the next year's puja HMV release, in October 1970.

Kazi Sabyasachi, the third son of nationalist Kazi Nazrul Islam, hosted both a television and radio show named Binaca Rupkatha. Mazumdar partnered with him and they worked together for many years. Mazumdar sang the Alibaba jingle and Sabyasachi played the role of the character Alibaba. They came to be known as the Uttam-Suchitra of radio. The audience wanted Mazumdar to play the role of Marzina, a female character in the show, which she did after some time. Many of the listeners sent letters to them. The letters, which were not considered hateful by Mazumder, were sent after being processed by the Park Street post office.

Mazumdar started performing in theatres (on-stage) immediately after singing for pujas. The theatres used to host shows of many varieties, including performances by actors, dancers and singers, which would resume one after another. The shows often drew thousands of visitors, located in Kolkata. Mazumdar performed in all-night shows with singers and composers such as Hemanta Mukhopadhyay, Manna Dey and V. Balsara. She was mostly assigned specifically to midnight shows.

== Collaboration with other musical artists ==
Ustad Munawar Ali Khan, one of the music teachers of Sravanti Mazumdar, was the son of a musician who was also the teacher of Sandhya Mukherjee. Mazumdar met Mukherjee at her guru's (Khan) residence. She asked Mukherjee to sing with her, creating the song "Tumi Amar Maa". It is the second-best-known song by Mazumdar. The best known song of Mazumdar was "Aay Khuku Aay" written by Pulak Bandyopadhyay, music composed by V. Balsara and sung in collaboration with Hemanta Mukherjee, and recreated many times in popular culture. Aay Khuku Aay was first asked by theatres to be sung by Mazumdar two years later.

In the following years, Mazumdar sang jingles written by associated artists like Pulak Bandyopadhyay, Colonel Bose and Mihir Sen, forming a working relationship mainly between Bandyopadhyay and Mazumdar. She became friends with Bappi Lahiri when doing a puja album for HMV that had four songs. They did a few more non-film albums and singles. Mazumdar although having planned, never did any songs with R. D. Burman. The first time, with a Bengali song, Burman was leaving for a United States tour. Mazumdar met Burman in the Bombay HMV studio for a puja album release. Burman liked the songs. Later, he visited the Living Sound studio a few times with his friend Badal Bhattacharya, also a friend of Bose and Mazumdar. When leaving for the USA tour, Burman suggested her to work with Anu Malik, who did not explicitly know Bengali, which Mazumdar introduced him to. He composed two songs and the music for "Jibonsathi khunjte giye pelam je go dujoner dekha", a spiritual sequel to "Aay Khuku Aay", lyrics written by Bandyopadhyay. The second time, with an album, R. D. Burman had died.

== Hemanta Mukherjee and Aay Khuku Aay ==
Sravanti Mazumdar and Hemanta Mukherjee released the song "Aay Khuku Aay" in 1976. A song about a father and her daughter, Mukherjee was the father and Mazumdar played the daughter's role. She had met Hemanta Mukherjee through her friend Jayanta Mukherjee, who was Hemanta's son, getting in formal contact with the Mukherjee family. Hemanta had previously picked his daughter Ranu Mukherjee to sing the song, but she dropped out of the role. The vocals was later assigned to Mazumdar by Balsara. Mazumdar was not informed of the singer's role change. After a few years of the song's release, she sang the song solo at all stage events and concerts she went to. The song became pivotal in the popularity of Mazumdar, and everyone present at the concerts wanted to hear "Aay Khuku Aay". It was recreated many times by vocalists from West Bengal and sometimes from Bangladesh. Normally, a sad and sentimental song, many times made people cry when listening to it. After her father died and she left to go abroad, Mazumdar expressed the urge to cry when singing the song.

== Rabindra Sangeet ==
Mazumdar's home was influenced by Rabindranath Tagore and Kazi Nazrul Islam. She studied in Kamala Girls High School, where Rabindra Sangeet classes were compulsory. Bharatidi was the teacher of the class. After graduating, she learned Rabindra Sangeet from Maya Sen, who was the elder sister of Bharatidi. Mazumdar remembers all the songs from Bharatidi's class. Mazumdar was forbidden to partake in any Rabindra Jayanti. No one told her to sing.

Mazumdar started the composition of the album Tagore in Celtic in 2017, consisting of Rabindra Sangeet. For making the album, she learnt the influence of Celtic music on Rabindranath Tagore, which gave rise to some songs. After composing the album songs, she sent them for approval to the Isle of Man Arts Council, owned by the government. Many of committee members liked the song. She originally wrote the songs in Bengali with some Celtic language added. English narration was added to make the song able to be understood by non-Bengalis. For translation Mazumdar found the lyricist Bobs Carswell, who had knowledge of Tagore's works and had read English translation of his poems. She repeated the tune and melodies, and sung the song with Carswell. Carswell translated the album's first songs "Jodi Tor Daak Shune Keu Na Aase" and "Fulefule Dholaydholay." She presented the two songs to David Kilgallon, a Mens Traditional singer. Kilgallon having sung a lot of songs, agreed to publish them. Mazumdar's Rabindranath songs in Celtic are the first of its kind in history, which Mazumdar expressed. These songs were unable to be played on Kolkata's radio since new Bengali songs were no longer in circulation to be played, but they were played in foreign countries' radio.
