= Jadur Bashi =

- Poster
- Bengali: যাদুর বাঁশি
- Directed by: Abdul Latif Bachchu
- Screenplay by: Ahmed Zaman Chowdhury
- Story by: Ahmed Zaman Chowdhury
- Produced by: Iqbal Mahmud
- Starring: Apu Sarwar; Suchorita; Razzak; Bulbul Ahmed; ATM Shamsuzzaman
- Cinematography: Abdul Latif Bachchu
- Edited by: Aminul Islam Mintu
- Music by: Azad Rahman
- Distributed by: Spotlight Production
- Release date: December 30, 1977
- Running time: 130 minutes
- Country: Bangladesh
- Language: Bengali

Jadur Bashi (Bengali: যাদুর বাঁশি) is a 1977 Bengali romantic film directed by Abdul Latif Bachchu. Story, screenplay and dialogue were written by Ahmed Zaman Chowdhury. Apu Sarwar has played the main character in the film along with Suchorita, Razzak, Bulbul Ahmed, ATM Shamsuzzaman in the supporting roles. The film won the Bangladesh National Film Awards in three categories.

== Cast ==
- Apu Sarwar – Jadu
- Suchorita – Pakhi
- Razzak – Mohar Ali
- Bulbul Ahmed – Doctor Yusuf
- Olivia – Amena
- Shabana – Najma
- Inam Ahmed – Tamiz Ali, the father of the Pakhi
- Sultana Zaman – Mother of Jadu
- Sumita Devi – The grandmother of the Pakhi
- ATM Shamsuzzaman – The uncle of the Pakhi
- Ariful Haque
- Tele Samad – Pair Ali
- Dildera
- Sharwari
- Supriya
- Parab Babu – Madhu Moyra
- Zia Uddin
- Abdul Malek

== Music ==
Jadur Bashi film's music was directed by Azad Rahman. The soundtrack for the film was composed by Ahmed Zaman Chowdhury. The film's singers are Sabina Yasmin, Runa Laila and Khurshid Alam.

=== Track listing ===
No.	Title	Singer(s)	Length
1.	"Jadu Bina Pakhi"	Runa Laila	4:33
2.	"Sadher Dheu Re"	Sabina Yasmin	3:47

== Award ==
3rd National Film Awards

- Won: Best Music Director – Azad Rahman
- Won: Best Female Playback singer- Runa Laila
- Won: Best Screenwriter – Ahmed Zaman Chowdhury
