= Bhat De =

Bangladeshi film

- DVD cover
- Directed by: Amjad Hossain
- Written by: Amjad Hossain
- Produced by: Abu Jafor Khan
- Starring: Alamgir; Shabana; Wasimul Bari Rajib; Anwar Hossain
- Music by: Amjad Hossain; Alauddin Ali
- Release date: 1984
- Country: Bangladesh
- Language: Bengali

Bhat De (Bengali: ভাত দে) is a Bangladeshi film, released in 1984. The film was edited, written and directed by Amjad Hossain. The film starred Alamgir, and Shabana in the lead roles and co-starred Wasimul Bari Rajib, Anwar Hossain and more.

== Cast ==
- Alamgir
- Shabana – Jori
- Wasimul Bari Rajib
- Anwar Hossain
- Anwara
- Akhi Alamgir – child actor

== Crew ==
- Producer – Abu Zafar Khan
- Director – Amjad Hossain
- Screenplay – Amjad Hossain
- Image Editor – Mujibur Rahman Dulu
- Art Directors – Anjan Bhowmik
- Sound – MA Baset
- Music – Alauddin Ali

== Accolades ==
=== National Film Awards ===
In 1984 the film Bhalt De has got best film award and including total 9 awards.

- Won Best Actress – Shabana 1984
- Won Best child actor – Akhi Alamgir 1984
- Won Best Director: Amjad Hossain 1984
- Won Best Producer: Abu Jafar Khan 1984
- Won Best Screenwriter Abu Zafar Khan 1984
- Won Best dialogue writer Abu Zafar Khan 1984
- Won Best sound customer MA Baset, 1984
- Won Best Image Editor Mujibur Rahman Dulu 1984
- Won Best Art Instruction Anjan Bhowmik, 1984

== International awards ==
The Bengali film Bhat De was the part of the Cannes International Film Festival.

== Music ==
=== Soundtrack ===
Track	Songs	Singer	Note
1	"Koto Kanlam Koto Daklam Ailona"	Tapon Chowdhury	
2	"Gasher Ekta Pata Jhorle, Kaser Ekta Manush Morle Khobor To Key Rakhena"	Syed Abdul Hadi	
3	"Chineshi Tomara, Akare Prokare, Diner Alo Rater Adhare"	Sabina Yasmin	

== See also ==
- Rani Kuthir Baki Itihash
- Biyer Phul
