= Bandi Theke Begum =

1975 film

- Bengali: বাঁদী থেকে বেগম
- Directed by: Mohshin
- Screenplay by: Ahmad Zaman Chowdhury
- Story by: Ahmad Zaman Chowdhury
- Produced by: Jaglul Mahmud
- Starring: Razzak; Shahed Sharif; Bobita
- Cinematography: Abdul Latif Bachchu
- Edited by: Awkat Hossain
- Music by: Azad Rahman; Alauddin Ali (Background music)
- Distributed by: Laser Vision (VCD)
- Release date: 28 February 1975 (Bangladesh)
- Running time: 143 minutes
- Country: Bangladesh
- Language: Bengali language

Bandi Theke Begum (Bengali: বাঁদী থেকে বেগম) is a Bangladeshi drama film, released in 1975. The film was directed by Mohshin. Story, screenplay and dialogue were done by journalist and also writer Ahmed Zaman Choudhury. The film stars Razzak and Bobita in the lead roles with Shahed Sharif, Zafor Iqbal, Baby Zaman, and Khalil in supporting roles. In the film, Bobita won National Film Award for the first time.

== Cast ==
- Razzak - Ali Nowsher
- Shahed Sharif
- Babita - Chadni
- Maya Hazarika
- Jubair Alam
- Jarina
- Kanak
- Sulagna
- Khan Zainul
- Shayla Zaman
- Khalil
- Safadar Ali Bhuiyan
- Baby Zaman
- Zafar Iqbal

== Music ==
The film music directed by Azad Rahman. Ahmad Zaman Chowdhury penned the lyrics. The film singer are Sabina Yasmin, Nazmul Huda Bachchu and Anjuman Ara Begum.

=== Track list ===
No.	Title	Singer(s)	Length
1.	"Chol Chol Chol Ponkhiraj"	Sabina Yasmin	2:45
2.	"Bonduk Ken Bondhu"	Anjuman Ara Begum	2:47
3.	"Selam Tomay Samajpoti"	Sabina Yasmin	3:55
4.	"Ami Chholonamoyi Naari"	Sabina Yasmin	4:10

== Award ==
National Film Award

- Won: Best Actress - Babita
