= Hangor Nodi Grenade =

- Film Poster
- হাঙর নদী গ্রেনেড
- Directed by: Chashi Nazrul Islam
- Written by: Tarek Mahmud; Shafiqur Rahman
- Screenplay by: Chashi Nazrul Islam
- Based on: Hangor Nodi Grenade by Selina Hossain
- Starring: Suchorita; Sohel Rana; Aruna Biswas
- Cinematography: Z.H. Mintu
- Edited by: Syed Mohammad Murad
- Music by: Sheikh Sadi Khan
- Release date: November 21, 1997 (Bangladesh)
- Running time: 113 minutes
- Country: Bangladesh
- Language: Bengali

Hangor Nodi Grenade is a 1997 film directed by Chashi Nazrul Islam. The story is based on the novel of the same name by Selina Hossain. That film won Bangladesh National Film Award in three categories including Best Director, Best Story and Best Actress. It is one of the most critically acclaimed Bangladeshi films.

== Plot ==
A teenage girl from a village is married at a young age to an older man named Gofur. Gafur's children from the previous marriage, Salim and Kalim, are his two sons. The stepmother loves both of them. But she also wants her children. Then her son Raees was born. But the son was born mute.

Meanwhile, Gafur dies, and the eldest son Salim gets married. His new wife, Ramiza, comes home and war begins. Salim goes to war and Kalim is left at home to look after his mother. After getting this information from the Pakistanis, the Major captured Kalim and beat him for giving the information to the freedom fighters. At one point, they shoot Kalim dead in front of his mother.

The war took on a more sinister form. Ramiza's father takes Ramiza. Two sons of Ramzan Ali of the village went to war to be taken to the camp and tortured. One night, cornered during an operation, the two fighters took refuge in his old lady's house. Pakistani forces chased them and reached his house. In an ordeal of patriotism, a mother surrenders her longed-for child to the gun barrel of the Pakistan Army to save the freedom fighters.

== Production ==
Indian filmmaker Satyajit Ray wanted to make a film based on the famous novel Hangor nodi Grenade by the famous Bangladeshi novelist Selina Hossain. In a letter written to Selina Hossain on August 13, 1975, he praised the novel and hoped to make it into a film. But the film was not made due to the internal political situation in Bangladesh at that time. After the death of Satyajit Ray, Bangladeshi filmmaker Chashi Nazrul Islam decided to make it in 1993. After the production, the film was released in 1997.

== Cast ==
- Suchorita as Buri
- Sohel Rana as Gofur Mia
- Aruna Biswas as Nita
- Chashi Nazrul Islam as Ramiza's father
