= Banglar Bodhu =

- Directed by: A. J. Mintu
- Screenplay by: A. J. Mintu
- Starring: Shabana; Alamgir; Omar Sunny
- Release date: 1994
- Country: Bangladesh
- Language: Bengali

Banglar Bodhu (English: The Bengali Bride) (Bengali: বাংলার বধূ) is a 1993 Bangladeshi film starring Alamgir and Shabana opposite him. A. J. Mintu garnered Bangladesh National Film Award for Best Director.

== Synopsis ==
A newly married woman struggles with getting acquaintance with her in-law's house members and becoming the apple of the eye of the family.

== Cast ==
- Shabana
- Alamgir
- Omar Sunny

== Soundtrack ==
All songs were composed by Alam Khan and written by Moniruzzaman Monir

- "Ke Sui Hoye Ghore Dhoke" - Andrew Kishore, Sabina Yasmin and Khurshid Alam
- "Oi Meyeti Keno Eto Sundori" - Andrew Kishore
- "Ektu Ektu Kore Kachhe Esechhi" - Andrew Kishore, Runa Laila
- "Tumi Ami Dujon Jadur Baksho" - Baby Naznin, Khurshid Alam
- "Shonibare Robibare Shombare" - Andrew Kishore, Runa Laila

== Awards ==
Bangladesh National Film Awards 1993

- Best Director - A. J. Mintu
- Best Screenwriter - A. J. Mintu
- Best Film Editing Award - Mujibur Rahman Dulu
