= The Father (1979 film) =

Bangladeshi film

- Poster
- Directed by: Kazi Hayat
- Starring: Bulbul Ahmed; Shuchorita
- Release date: 1979
- Country: Bangladeshi

The Father is a Bangladeshi film, directed by Kazi Hayat and released in 1979. The film starred Bulbul Ahmed and Shuchorita. The title role was played by John Napier Adams, a long-term American expatriate and IT consultant for USAID in Bangladesh. This is one of the few instances of a non-Bangladeshi playing a major role in a domestic film. The film gave popularity to two hit songs: "Ami Ki Gaibe Gaan" and "Aay Khuku Aay".

== Soundtrack ==
Hasan Fakhri is the lyricist whereas Azad Rahman is the composer.

- "Ami Ki Gaibe Gaan" (female) – Shammi Akhtar
- "Ami Ki Gaibe Gaan" (male) – Azad Rahman
- "Aay Khuku Aay" – Sravanti Mazumdar and Hemanta Mukherjee (written by Pulak Bandyopadhyay and composed by V. Balsara)
- "Oi Modhu Chand" – Runa Laila and Mahmudunnabi

[Note: Runa Laila and Azad Rahman also lent voice to the Soundtrack]
