= Osru Diye Lekha =

Bangladeshi film

- Poster
- Directed by: Kamal Ahmed
- Starring: Razzak; Sujata; Shuchonda
- Music by: Ali Hossain; Subal Das
- Release date: 12 May 1972
- Country: Bangladesh
- Language: Bengali

Osru Diye Lekha (Bengali: অশ্রু দিয়ে লেখা) is a 1972 Bangladeshi film directed by Kamal Ahmed. It was released on 12 May 1972. The film received critical acclaim, particularly for the acting of Sujata and the songs performed by Sabina Yasmin, her "Osru Diye Lekha"s .

== Cast ==
- Abdur Razzak
- Sujata
- Suchanda

== Music ==
All music were composed by Ali Hossain with background score by Subal Das. Songs were written by Mohammad Moniruzzaman.

=== Track List ===
No.	Title	Singer(s)	Length
1.	"Aaj Mon Rakha Holo Daay"	Khurshid Alam
2.	"Osru Diye Lekha E Gaan"	Sabina Yasmin
3.	"Na Shore Jeona"	Shahnaz Rahmatullah
4.	"Ami Jani Janire"	Sabina Yasmin
5.	"Osru Diye Lekha E Gaan (sad)"	Sabina Yasmin
