= Dui Jibon =

Bangladeshi film by Abdullah al Mamun released in 1988

- Bengali: দুই জীবন
- Directed by: Abdullah al Mamun
- Screenplay by: Abdullah al Mamun
- Story by: Abdullah al Mamun
- Produced by: Suchana Films
- Starring: Bulbul Ahmed; Kabori Sarwar; Afzal Hossain; Parveen Sultana Diti
- Cinematography: Rafiqul Bari Chowdhury
- Edited by: Atikur Rahman Mollik
- Music by: Alam Khan
- Distributed by: Suchana Films (1988); New Eagle Video (2011)
- Release date: 1988
- Running time: 135 minutes
- Country: Bangladesh
- Language: Bengali

Dui Jibon (Bengali: দুই জীবন) is a 1988 Bangladeshi drama film directed by Abdullah al Mamun, who also wrote the story. The screenplay and dialogue is written by Jahirul Haque. The film stars Bulbul Ahmed, Kabori Sarwar, Afzal Hossain, Parveen Sultana Diti in leading roles with Neepa Monalisa, Tina Khan, Jahirul Haque, Adil, Amol Bose, Minu Rahman Minoti in supporting roles. In 1988, the film won Bangladesh National Film Award for the best film and another 5 categories.

== Cast ==
- Bulbul Ahmed as Mustafa
- Kabori Sarwar as Tahmina
- Afzal Hossain as Robin
- Diti as Moushumi
- Nipa Monalisa as Kulsum
- Tina Khan as Dayana
- Zahirul Haque as Tahmina's Father
- Adil as Rayhan
- Amol Bose
- Minu Rahman as Mustafa's Mother
- Minoti Hossain
- Monowara

== Music ==
Dui Jibon's music is directed by Alam Khan. Song lyrics are by Moniruzzman Moni. The songs are performed by Sabina Yasmin, Syed Abdul Hadi, Andrew Kishore, Runa Laila, and Shamima Yasmin Diba. Most of the songs of this film became popular.

=== Track listing ===
No.	Title	Artist(s)	Artists on screen	Length
01	Tumi Chara Ami Eka	Sabina Yasmin & Syed Abdul Hadi	Bulbul Ahmed & Nipa Monalisa	4:44
02	Abar Dujone Dekha Holo	Sabina Yasmin	Bulbul Ahmed & Kabori Sarwar	3:47
03	Ami Ekdin Tomay Na Dakhile	Runa Laila & Andrew Kishore	Afzal Hossain & Parveen Sultana Diti	5:11
04	Tumi Ajj Katha Diyeso	Andrew Kishore & Runa Laila	Afzal Hossain & Parveen Sultana Diti	4:48
05	Abbu Amar Bandhur	Shamima Yeasmin Diba	Bulbul Ahmed ও Nipa Monalisa	

== Awards ==
National Film Awards

- Won: Best Films - Suchana Films
- Won: Best Director - Abdullah al Mamun
- Won: Best Lyricist - Manirujjaman Monir
- Won: Best Female Playback Singer - Sabina Yasmin
- Won: Best Screenplay - Abdullah al Mamun
- Won: Best Art Editor - Atikur Rahman Mollik
