= Ononto Prem =

Bangladeshi film

- Poster
- Directed by: Abdur Razzak
- Produced by: Rajlakshmi Productions
- Starring: Razzak; Anwara Begum; Bobita; ATM Shamsuzzaman
- Music by: Azad Rahman
- Release date: 1977
- Country: Bangladesh
- Language: Bengali

Ononto Prem is a 1977 Bangladeshi film directed by Razzak and starring Razzak and Bobita. This was the first film directed by Razzak.

== Controversies ==
The film became very controversial due to a two minute long kissing scene between Razzak and Bobita. It was the first kissing scene in Dhallywood and was almost unthinkable at that time. However, the scene was erased in the final cut.

== Music ==
- "O Chokhe Chokh Poreche Jokhoni" - Sabina Yasmin and Khurshid Alam
- "Alo Tumi Nibhe Jao" - Sabina Yasmin

== Awards ==
3rd Bangladesh National Film Awards

- Best Cinematographer (black and white) - Reza Latif
