= Lalu Bhulu =

Bangladeshi film

- Poster
- Directed by: Kamal Ahmed
- Based on: Lalu Bhulu by Nihar Ranjan Gupta
- Produced by: Mojibur Rahman Bhuiya
- Starring: Sohel Rana; Razzak
- Music by: Subal Das
- Release date: 25 February 1983
- Country: Bangladesh
- Language: Bengali

Lalu Bhulu (Bengali: লালু ভুলু, romanized: Lalu Bhulu) is a 1983 Bangladeshi drama film starring Razzak and Sohel Rana as two brothers Lalu and Bhulu. The film is based on a same name novel of Dr. Nihar Ranjan Gupta. Sohel Rana garnered his lone Bangladesh National Film Award for Best Actor for his performance in the film.

== Cast ==
- Sohel Rana as Lalu
- Razzak as Bhulu
- Golam Mustafa
- Shabana
- Anwar Hossain
- Darashiko

== Track listing ==
1. "Tomra Jara Aaj Amader" - Khurshid Alam
2. "Dosti Jodi Chao" - Khurshid Alam

== Awards ==
Bangladesh National Film Awards

- Best Actor - Sohel Rana
- Best Director - Kamal Ahmed
