= Shuchorita =

Bangladeshi film actress (born 1958)

- Born: Baby Helen; Dhaka, East Pakistan, Pakistan
- Occupation: Film actress
- Years active: 1969–present
- Notable work: Jadur Bashi, Hangor Nodi Grenade
- Spouse(s): Jashim (div) KMR Manzoor (m. 1989; div. 2012)
- Relatives: Rita (sister)

Baby Helen (known by her stage name Shuchorita) is a Bangladeshi film actress. She won the Bangladesh National Film Award for Best Actress for her role in the film Hangor Nodi Grenade (1997) and Best Supporting Actress for Meghkonna (2018). She has acted in over 100 movies.

== Background ==
Shuchorita was born in Dhaka, the middle child of three siblings. She has an older sister, Rita, and had a younger brother, Manu, who died in a home accident in 1998.

== Career ==
Shuchorita got into the film industry through the help of her aunt, Panna, a dance artist herself. She started her acting career as a child artist, playing the role of a boy, in the 1969 film Bablu. She was cast as the lead actress in the film Shikriti in 1972. As an actress, she got her breakthrough in the film Jadur Bashi (1977).

== Works ==
- Jadur Bashi (1977)
- The Father (1979)
- Priya Tumi Sukhi Hou
- Jibon Nowka
- Jonny
- Rongila Jorina Sundori
- Daku Monsur
- Amtola Amtola
- Nai Telephone Naire Peon
- Ekhono Anek Raat
- Hangor Nodi Grenade (1997)
- Kotha Dilam
- Traash (1992)
- Danga (1991)
- Nagordola
- Ballo Shikkha
- Bodla
- Gaddar
- Chitkar
- Megh Bizli Badol
- Shamsher
- Duniyadari
- Mohammad Ali
- Rocky
- Mastan
- Taal Betal
- Somapti
- Janowar
- Alor Pothe
- Chokka Panja
- Sonar Horin
- Sonar Tori
- Ashami
- Tufan
- Noder Chad
- Ghor Sangchar
- Kudrat
- Nam Bodnam
- Shakkhi
- Akhi Milon
- Kusum Koli
- Mayer Momota
- Ajante (1996)
- Taka (2005)
- Griholokkhi
- Jiboner Cheye Dami
- Nishwartha Bhalobasa (2013)
- Ostitto (2016)
- DayMukti (2025)

== Personal life ==
In the early 1980s, Shuchorita was married to actor Jashim for a year. In 1989, she married film producer, KMR Manzoor, and they have three children together. The couple got divorced in December 2012.

== Awards ==
Beside the Bangladesh National Film Award, Shuchorita won Best Actress award from Bangladesh Film Journalists Association in 1981.
