= Black Anwar =

Bangladeshi actor (1941–2007)

- ব্ল্যাক আনোয়ার
- Born: 10 July 1941; Sutrapur, Dhaka, Bengal Presidency, British India
- Died: 10 November 2007 (aged 66); Dhaka, Bangladesh
- Occupation: Actor

Black Anwar (10 July 1941 – 10 November 2007) was a Bangladeshi film and television actor. In 1989 he won Bangladesh National Film Award for Best Actor in Supporting Role for his performance in Byathar Daan.

== Career ==
Anwar debuted his acting career in the film Shuorani Duorani. His last acted film was Kabuliwala.

== Works ==
- Shuorani Duorani (1968)
- Jibon Theke Neya (1970)
- Ananta Prem (1977)
- Byathar Daan (1989)
- Oshanto Dheu
- Shakkhi
- Shoth Bhai
- Kabuliwala (2006)
- Akkel Alir Nirbachon (2008)
