= Ali Hossain =

Bangladeshi composer (1940–2021)

- আলী হোসেন
- Born: 23 March 1940; Comilla, Bengal Presidency, British India
- Died: 17 February 2021 (aged 80); Boston, United States
- Occupations: Music composer and director

Ali Hossain (23 March 1940 – 17 February 2021) was a Bangladeshi music composer. He was notable for the songs like "Osru Diye Lekha E Gaan", and "Holud Bato Mendi Bato". He has composed music for 42 films in his career. He won Bangladesh National Film Award for Best Music Director for his music direction in the 1989 film Byathar Daan. He was honored at 12th Channel-i Music Awards (2017) for his contribution to Bangladeshi music.

== Early life and career ==
Hossain was born in Comilla in the then Bengal Presidency, British India.

Hossain got his breakthrough by composing the song "Osru Diye Lekha A Gaan", sung by Sabina Yasmin in the 1972 film Osru Diye Lekha.

== Notable songs ==
Hossain's notable music compositions include:

- "Koto je tomake beshechi bhalo"
- "Chaturi Jane na Mor Bodhua"
- "Arey O Praner Raja Tumi Je Amar"
- "E Akash K Shakkhi Rekhe E Batash K Shakkhi Rekhe"
- "O Duti Noyone Shopone Choyone Nijere Je Bhule Jay Tulona Khuje Na Pay"
- "Kehoi Kore Bechakena"
- "Ke Tumi Ele Go Amar E Jibone"

Hossain composed Urdi songs for the films "Chhote Saheb", "Daag", "Anari", "Coolie", and others.

Hossain died on 17 February 2021 at a hospital in Boston, United States.
