= Alamgir (actor) =

Bangladeshi actor

- আলমগীর
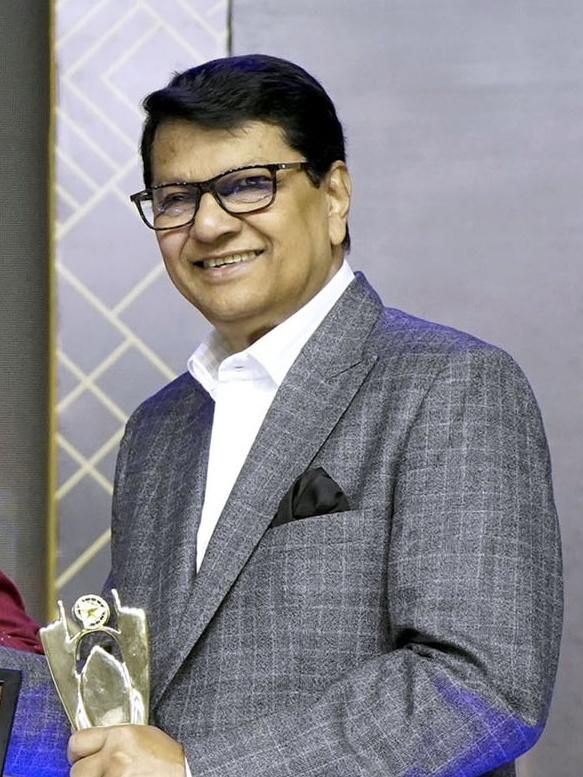
- Alamgir in 2024
- Born: Mohiuddin Ahmad Alamgir; 3 April 1950 (aged 76); Dhaka, East Bengal, Dominion of Pakistan
- Education: University of Dhaka
- Occupations: Actor, director, presenter
- Years active: 1972–present
- Spouses: Khoshnur (m. 1973–1999); Runa Laila (m. 1999)
- Children: 3, including Akhi Alamgir
- Awards: Ekushey Padak (2024) See full list

Mohiuddin Ahmad Alamgir (born 3 April 1950), better known as simply Alamgir, is a Bangladeshi film actor and television host. He won the Bangladesh National Film Award for Best Actor and the Bangladesh National Film Award for Best Supporting Actor a record nine times for his roles in the films Ma O Chhele (1985), Apekka (1987), Khotipuron (1989), Moroner Pore (1990), Pita Mata Santan (1991), Andha Biswas (1992) and Desh Premik (1994), Jibon Moroner Sathi (2010) and Ke Apon Ke Por (2011).

== Early life and education ==
Mohiuddin Ahmad Alamgir was born on 3 April 1950 at the Dhaka Medical College Hospital in East Bengal. His father, Kalim Uddin Ahmed, was an executive producer of Mukh O Mukhosh, the first Bengali-language feature film to be made in Bangladesh. Alamgir studied political science at the University of Dhaka.

== Career ==
Alamgir made his debut with the film Amar Jonmobhumi (1972) directed by Alamgir Kumkum. He then went on to star in Dasyurani alongside Shabana, with whom he would later work in 130 films. In 1975, Alamgir starred in Love In Shimla alongside Kabori, with whom he would later work in 26 films. In 1986, he made his directorial debut with the film Nishpap.

He has worked in television dramas and also as a presenter. Alamgir is the host of the game show Houseful on Maasranga Television.

== Personal life ==
Alamgir was first married to lyricist Khoshnur Alamgir. Together they have three children: two daughters, one of whom is singer Akhi Alamgir, and one son. Alamgir later married singer Runa Laila.

== Filmography ==
Year	Film	Role	Notes	Ref.
1972	Amar Jonmovumi			
1973	Dassurani			
1975	Chashir Meye			
1975	Joy Porajoy			
1975	Love in Simla			
1976	Shapmukti			
1976	Monihar			
1978	Madhumita			
1979	Badla	Shaju		
1980	Koshai			
1980	Ostad Saagred			
1982	Rajanigandha			
1982	Al Helal	Khayyam		
1982	Protigya			
1984	Bhat De			
1984	Ma o Chele			
1987	Apekkha			
1988	Pothe Holo Dekha			
1990	Moroner Pare			
1992	Satya Mithya			
1992	Ranga Vabhi			
1993	Mayer Ashirbad			
1994	Judge Barrister	Barrister Sojib Chowdhury		
1996	Sotter Mrittu Nei			
1996	Nirmom			
1998	Ma Jokhon Bicharok	Alam Chowdhury		
2012	Se Amar Mon Kereche			
2013	Judge Barrister Police Commissioner			
2015	Dui Prithibi			
2017	Dhaka Attack			
2018	Ekti Cinemar Golpo	Akash	Also as screenwriter and director	
2019	Ahaa Re		Indian Bengali film	
2020	Bishwoshundori			

== Awards ==
Year	Award	Category	Film	Result
1985	Bangladesh National Film Awards	Best Actor	Ma o Chele	Won
1987	Bangladesh National Film Awards	Best Actor	Opekkha	Won
1989	Bangladesh National Film Awards	Best Actor	Khati Puron	Won
1990	Bangladesh National Film Awards	Best Actor	Moroner Pore	Won
1991	Bangladesh National Film Awards	Best Actor	Pita Mata Sontan	Won
1992	Bangladesh National Film Awards	Best Actor	Andho Biswas	Won
1994	Bangladesh National Film Awards	Best Actor	Desh Premik	Won
2010	Bangladesh National Film Awards	Best Supporting Actor	Jibon Moroner Sathi	Won
2011	Bangladesh National Film Awards	Best Supporting Actor	Ke Apon Ke Por	Won
2024	Ekushey Padak	Arts	(Acting)	Won
2025	Meril-Prothom Alo Awards	Lifetime Achievement	—N/a	Won
