= Subal Das =

Bangladeshi music director and composer

- Born: 26 December 1928; Brahmanbaria, Bengal Presidency, British India
- Died: 16 August 2005 (aged 76); Kolkata, India
Association football career
- Position: Goalkeeper
Senior career*
Years	Team	Apps	(Gls)
1951–1954	Azad SC		
1955–1956	Police AC		
- * Club domestic league appearances and goals

Subal Das (26 December 1928 – 16 August 2005) was a Bangladeshi music director, composer and footballer. He was the music director of the first film developed in Film Development Corporation (FDC), Akash aar Mati. He directed music of 86 films.

== Early life ==
Das was born on 27 December 1927 in Brahmanbaria District, East Bengal, British Raj.

== Career ==
Das took music lessons from Ustad Israel Khan, nephew of musician Ustad Alauddin Khan. Das started working for the radio in 1963.

Das had been suffering from anal cancer. He died of cardiac arrest on 16 August 2005 at the Lifeline Hospital in Kolkata, India.

== Personal life ==
Das was married to Aporna Das (d. 1996).

== Football career ==
Das played as a goalkeeper for Azad Sporting Club from 1951 to 1954, during which the club finished runners-up in the Dhaka First Division League in 1953 and 1954.

== Discography ==
- Swaralipi
- Darpachurna
- Anirban
- Tansen
- Jog Biyog
- Grihalakshmi
- Bhalo Manush
- Alo Tumi Aleya
- Pyaasa
- Kaajal
- Preet Na Janey Reet

== Awards ==
- Lifetime Achievement Award by Bangladesh Federation of Film Societies (BFFS): 2004
