= Runa Laila =

Bangladeshi singer (born 1952)

- রুনা লায়লা; رونا لیلیٰ
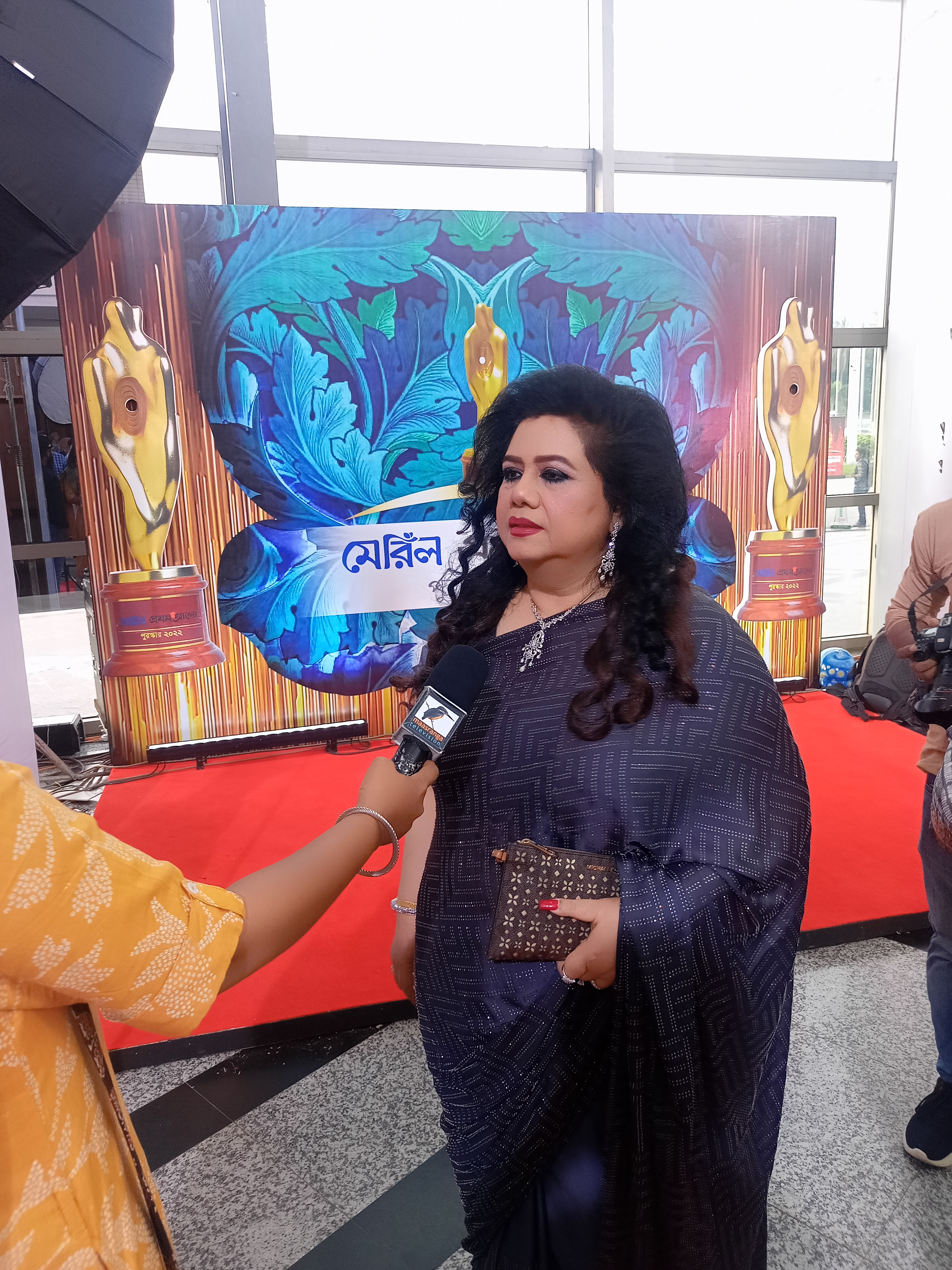
- Laila in 2023
- Pronunciation: [runa lae̯la]
- Born: 17 November 1952 (age 73); Sylhet, East Bengal, Dominion of Pakistan (now Bangladesh)
- Citizenship: Pakistani (1952–1974); Bangladeshi (1974–present)
- Occupations: Singer; music composer
- Years active: 1969–1991; 2008–present
- Works: Discography; filmography
- Spouses: Khawaja Javed Kaiser (divorced); Ron Daniel Pilnik (divorced); Alamgir (m. 1999)
- Relatives: Subir Sen (uncle); Ameen Faheem (brother-in-law)
- Awards: Full list
- Musical career
- Genres: Ghazal; pop; filmi; fusion; Sufi
- Instrument: Vocals

Runa Laila (Note: Bengali: রুনা লায়লা, Bengali pronunciation: [runa lae̯la]; Urdu: رونا لیلیٰ, Urdu pronunciation: [ɾuːnɑː lɛːlɑː].) (Bengali: রুনা লায়লা, pronounced [runa lae̯la]; born 17 November 1952) is a Bangladeshi playback singer and composer. Widely recognized as one of the most prominent singers in South Asia, she is often referred to by the honorific title "Queen of Melody". Over her decades-long career, she has recorded songs in several languages, gaining popularity across Bangladesh, Pakistan, and India.

Laila began her professional career in the Pakistani film industry in the late 1960s. Her early singing style was inspired by Pakistani playback singer Ahmed Rushdi with whom she frequently collaborated on duets. She gained profound international recognition with her iconic rendition of the traditional Sufi song "Dama Dam Mast Qalandar", which cemented her status as a legendary figure in South Asian music.

A highly decorated artist, Laila has won the Bangladesh National Film Awards for Best Female Playback Singer a record seven times for her vocal performances in films such as The Rain (1976), Jadur Banshi (1977), Accident (1989), and Ontore Ontore (1994). She later won Bangladesh National Film Award for Best Music Composer for the film Ekti Cinemar Golpo (2018). For her contributions to music and culture, she was awarded the Independence Award, the highest civilian honor in Bangladesh, in 1977.

== Background and early life ==
Runa Laila was born on 17 November 1952 in Sylhet, East Bengal, Dominion of Pakistan (present-day Bangladesh). Her father Syed Mohammed Imdad Ali belonged to a Bengali family of Muslim Syeds from Rajshahi. He was a civil servant posted in various towns such as Sylhet and Karachi. Her mother, Amina Laila (née Anita Sen), was a musical artist and came from a Bengali Hindu family based in Upper Assam. Runa's elder sister, Dina Laila, married to Pakistani politician Ameen Faheem, died on December, 27 1976 from leukemia. Her brother, Syed Ali Murad, is a businessman who owns Angana Resort Gazipur. Their maternal uncle, Subir Sen, was a notable Indian playback singer.

Laila started taking dance lessons of Kathak and Bharatanatyam genre. In those days, Ahmed Rushdi was the leading film singer who introduced rock n roll, disco and other modern genres to South Asian music. Following Rushdi's success, Christian bands specialising in jazz started performing at various night clubs and hotel lobbies in Karachi, Hyderabad, Mumbai, Dhaka and Lahore. Laila became a fan of singer Ahmed Rushdi whom she considered her guru (teacher), and tried to emulate not only his singing style but also the way he used to perform on the stage. She then learned classical music with her sister Dina. While she was a student of Saint Lawrence Convent, she won an inter-school singing competition in Karachi in the then West Pakistan. She, along with her sister, were trained by Ustad Abdul Kader Peyarang and Ustad Habibuddin Ahmed. Her cousin, Anjumara Begum, had already been a known singer. When Laila was 12, she performed as a playback singer for a male child actor in the Urdu language film Jugnu. The song was titled Gudia Si Munni Meri.

== Career ==
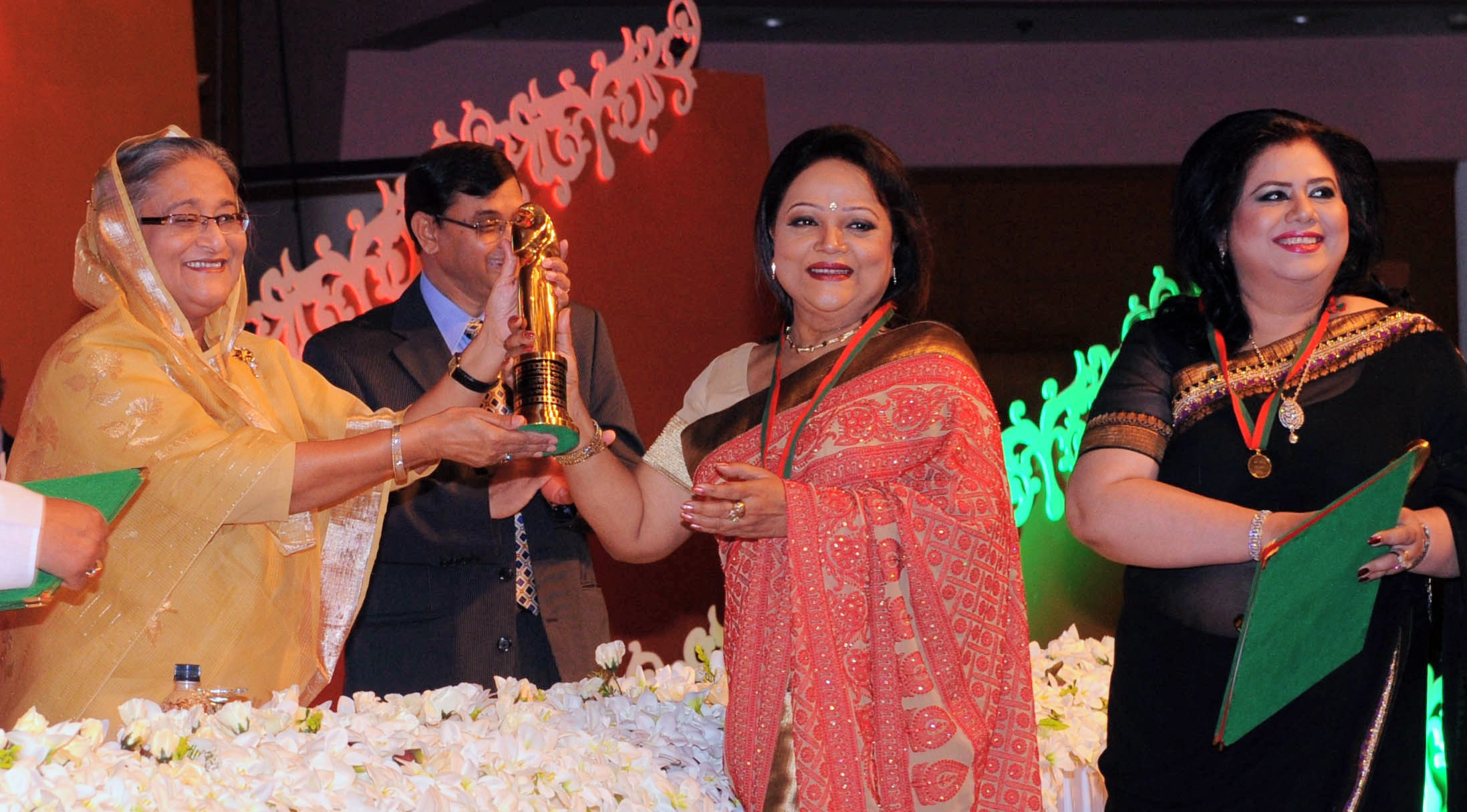
Sabina Yasmin and Laila receiving awards from Sheikh Hasina at Bangladesh National Film Awards ceremony (2015)

In 1966, Laila made her breakthrough in the Pakistani film industry with the song Unki Nazron Sey Mohabbat Ka Jo Paigham Mila for the Urdu film Hum Dono. She used to perform on PTV. In PTV, she had a show called Bazm E Laila. She started appearing on the Zia Mohyuddin Show (1972–74) and later sang songs for films in the 1970s such as the film Umrao Jaan Ada (1972).

Laila moved to Bangladesh along with her family in 1974. Her first Bengali song was O Amar Jibon Shathi for the film Jibon Shathi (1976), composed by Satya Saha. Shortly after had her first concert in India in 1974 in Mumbai. She started in Bollywood with director Jaidev, whom she met in Delhi, got her the chance to play at the inauguration of Doordarshan. She first worked with the music composer Kalyanji-Anandji for the title song of a film called Ek Se Badhkar Ek (1976). She gained popularity in India with the songs O Mera Babu Chail Chabila and Dama Dam Mast Qalandar. In 1974, she recorded Shaadher Lau in Kolkata. Laila's name has been written on the Guinness World Records for recording 30 songs within 3 days. In 1982, she won Golden Disk Award as her album Superuna composed by Bappi Lahiri was sold over 1 lakh copies on the first day of its release.

In October 2009, Laila released Kala Sha Kala, a collection of Punjabi wedding songs, in India. In 2012, Laila served as a judge on the show Sur Kshetra, an Indian television contest show for amateur singers. She described her relationship with fellow judge Asha Bhosle as that of sisters. In 2014, she collaborated with Sabina Yasmin on a song for a television play "Dalchhut Projapoti", the first time they worked on a song together. Laila has sung in seventeen languages including her native Bengali, Hindi, Urdu, Punjabi, Sindhi, Gujarati, Pashto, Baluchi, Arabic, Persian, Malay, Nepalese, Japanese, Italian, Spanish, French and English.

== Personal life ==
Laila has been married three times. She first married Khawaja Javed Kaiser, secondly a Swiss businessman Ron Daniel Pilnik and then actor Alamgir. In April 1996, a Dhaka court temporarily restrained Pilnik from entering Laila's house until her suit for a permanent injunction alleging he refused to marry on according to Islamic rules and that he abused her. Pilink later became Dubai based entrepreneur and investor.

With Khawaja Javed Kaiser, Laila has a daughter Tani Kaiser. Her grandson Zain Islam had been selected for the Arsenal progression center in 2012 when he was eight. Her other grandson Aaron Islam is a guitarist and singer.

== Charity ==
After her sister, Dina, died in 1976 from cancer, Laila held several charity concerts in Dhaka. The money raised was used to build a cancer hospital in Dhaka. Laila was named a SAARC Goodwill Ambassador for HIV/AIDS. She is the first Bangladeshi to hold this post. She visited New Delhi in 2013 on her first trip as the SAARC ambassador. She met India's External and Health ministers.

== Discography ==
- Sincerely Yours (1973)
- Runa Laila Sings Songs Of Talib-Ul-Maulla (1974)
- Great Ghazals - Runa Laila (Style) (1981)
- Runa in Pakistan (Geet) and (Ghazals) (1980)
- Bappi Lahiri Presents Runa Laila - Superuna (1982)
- Runa Goes Disco (1982)
- Sings For Umrao Jaan Ada (Ghazals) (1985)
- Ganga Amar Ma Padma Amar Ma (1996)
- Bazm-E-Laila (2007)
- Runa Laila-Kala Siah Kala (2010)

== Awards ==
- Independence Day Award, Bangladesh (1977)
- Bangladesh National Film Award for Best Female Playback Singer (1976, 1977, 1989, 1994, 2012, 2013 and 2014)
- Nigar Award, Pakistan (1968, 1970)
- Sheltech Award, Bangladesh
- Lux-Channel I Lifetime Performance Award, Bangladesh
- Saigal Award, India
- Critics Award, Pakistan
- Graduate Award, Pakistan
- Firoza Begum Memorial Gold Medal, Bangladesh
- Bangladesh Music Journalists Association (BMJA) lifetime achievement award, 2020
- Meril-Prothom Alo Lifetime Achievement Award (2022)
- Minar-E-Dilli Awards (2026)
- Radio Mirchi Music Award presented by Radio Mirchi at Nazrul Mancha in Kolkata (2015)
