= Bangladesh National Film Award for Best Child Artist =

National Film Awards for Best Child Artist
- Awarded for: Excellence in cinematic achievements for Bangladeshi cinema
- Sponsored by: Government of Bangladesh
- Location: Dhaka
- Country: Bangladesh
- Presented by: Ministry of Information
- First award: 1976 (2nd)
- Final award: 2018 (43rd)
- Currently held by: Fahim Muhtasim Lazim (2018)

Highlights
- Most awards: Prarthona Fardin Dighi (3 wins)
- Total awarded: 45
- First winner: Adnan (1976)
- Website: moi.gov.bd

Bangladesh National Film Award for Best Child Artist (Bengali: বাংলাদেশ জাতীয় চলচ্চিত্র পুরস্কার শ্রেষ্ঠ শিশু শিল্পী) is one of the most prestigious film awards given in Bangladesh. Since 1977, awards have been given in the category of Child Artist. Master Adnan was the first awardee of this category for child artist of the film Megher Okek Rong in 1976. Three times this award achieved by Prarthona Fardeen Dighi and Azad Rahman Shakil also gained two times.

== List of winners ==
Key

Symbol	Meaning
†	Indicates a joint award for that year

List of award recipients, showing the year, role(s), film(s) and language(s)
Year (Note: Denotes The year in which the film was censored by Bangladesh Film Censor Board.)	Recipient(s)	Role(s)	Work(s)	Ref
1976 (2nd)	Adnan	Adnan	Megher Onek Rong	
1977 (3rd)	Not Given			
1978 (4th) †	Azad Rahman Shakil		Dumurer Phul	
1978 (4th) †	Sumon	Manik	Ashikkhito	
1979 (5th) †	Elora Gohor	Maymun	Surja Dighal Bari	
1979 (5th) †	Sajib	Kasu	Surja Dighal Bari	
1980 (6th) †	Tiptip		Emiler Goenda Bahini	
1980 (6th) †	Azad Rahman Shakil	Son	Danpite Chhele	
1981	No Award			
1982 (7th)	Baby Bindi		Lal Kajol	
1983 (8th)	Not Given			
1984 (9th)	Akhi Alamgir	Young Jori	Bhat De	
1985 (10th)	Master Joy	Ram Lal	Ramer Sumoti	
1986 (11th)	Kamrunnahar Azad Swapna		Mayer Dabi	
1987 (12th) †	Rasel	Young Srikanto	Rajlakshmi Srikanta	
1987 (12th) †	Suborna Shirin	Young Rajlokkhi	Rajlakshmi Srikanta	
1988 (13th)	Tushar		Agomon	
1989 (14th)	Not Given			
1990 (15th)	Dodul		Lakhe Ekta	
1991 (16th)	Joyson		Santona	
1992 (17th)	Baby Taniya		Uchit Shikkha	
1993 (18th)	Anik		Abujh Santan	
1994 (19th)	Shila Ahmed	Opala	Aguner Poroshmoni	
1995 (20th)	Tonmoy		Anya Jibon	
1996 (21st)	Arun Saha		Dipu Number Two	
1997 (22nd)	Nusrat Anwar Nishi	Anu	Dukhai	
1998 (23rd)	Not Given			
1999 (24th)	Not Given			
2000 (25th)	Not Given			
2001 (26th) †	Shovon	Shovon	Bichchu Bahini	
2001 (26th) †	Shipu	Shipu	Bichchu Bahini	
2001 (26th) †	Shantanu	Shantanu	Bichchu Bahini	
2001 (26th) †	Twinkle	Twinkle	Bichchu Bahini	
2001 (26th) †	Rini	Rini	Bichchu Bahini	
2001 (26th) †	Rajib	Rajib	Bichchu Bahini	
2002 (27th)	Jonas Ebadat	Rokon	Matir Moina	
2003 (28th)	Priyanka		Kokhono Megh Kokhono Brishti	
2004 (29th)	Amol		Durotto	
2005 (30th)	Hridoy Islam	Shuvro	Taka	
2005 (30th)	Hardy Nation	Shantu	Taka	
2006 (31st)	Prarthona Fardin Dighi	Mini	Kabuliwala	
2007 (32nd)	Not Given			
2008 (33rd)	Prarthona Fardin Dighi	Dighi	Ek Takar Bou	
2009 (34th)	Syeda Wahida Sabrina	Nipa	Gangajatra	
2010 (35th)	Prarthona Fardin Dighi	Tripty	Chachchu Amar Chachchu	
2011 (36th)	Semanti		Khondo Golpo 1971	
2012 (37th)	Mamun	Komola/Jahir	Ghetuputra Komola	
2013 (38th)	Md Jubayer Mahamud Soccho	Dulal	Ekee Britte	
2014 (39th)	Abir Hossain Angkon	Jemy Chowdhury	Baishamya	
2015 (40th) †	Zara Zarib	Young Prarthona	Prarthona	
2015 (40th) †	Promia Rahman	Sadhana	Prarthona	
2016 (42nd)	Anum Rahman Khan Shajbati	Rupsha	Shankhachil	
2017 (42nd)	Naimur Rahman Apan	Rupsha	Chhitkini	
2018 (43rd)	Fahim Muhtasim Lazim		Putro	

== Special Category ==
List of award recipients, showing the year, role(s) and film(s)
Year (Note: Denotes The year in which the film was censored by Bangladesh Film Censor Board.)	Recipient(s)	Role(s)	Work(s)	Ref
2002 (27th)	Nurul Islam Bablu	Anu	Matir Moina	
2012 (37th)	Meghla	Aysha	Uttarer Sur	
2013 (38th)	Syeda Wahida Sabrina	Nodi	Antardhan	
2017 (42nd)	Anannyo Samayel	Titu	Ankhi O Tar Bandhura	
2018 (43rd)	Mahmudur Rahman Anindo	Jamal	Matir Projar Deshe	

== Records and statistics ==
=== Multiple wins ===
The following individuals received two or more Best Child awards:

Wins	Recipient(s)	Film(s)
3	Prarthona Fardin Dighi	Kabuliwala (2006); Ek Takar Bou (2008); Chachchu Amar Chachchu (2010)
2	Azad Rahman Shakil	Dumurer Phul (1978); Danpite Chhele (1980)

== See also ==
- Bangladesh National Film Award for Best Actor
- Bangladesh National Film Award for Best Actress
- Bangladesh National Film Award for Best Supporting Actor
- Bangladesh National Film Award for Best Supporting Actress
- Bangladesh National Film Award for Best Performance in a Negative Role
- Bangladesh National Film Award for Best Performance in a Comic Role

== Sources ==
- BFDC (2012). "List of National Film Award recipients name 1975-2012" (PDF). Bangladesh Film Development Corporation (in Bengali). Dhaka: Ministry of Information (Bangladesh). pp. 1–23. Archived from the original (PDF) on 1 November 2020.
- BFDC (2013). "National Film Award 2013". Bangladesh Film Development Corporation (in Bengali). Dhaka: Ministry of Information (Bangladesh). Archived from the original on 18 September 2020.
- BFDC (2014). "National Film Award 2014". Bangladesh Film Development Corporation (in Bengali). Dhaka: Ministry of Information (Bangladesh). Archived from the original on 18 September 2020.
- BFDC (2015). "National Film Award 2015" (PDF). Bangladesh Film Development Corporation (in Bengali). Dhaka: Ministry of Information (Bangladesh).
- BFDC (2016). "National Film Award 2016" (PDF). Bangladesh Film Development Corporation (in Bengali). Dhaka: Ministry of Information (Bangladesh).
- BFDC (2018). "National Film Award 2017-2018" (PDF). Bangladesh Film Development Corporation (in Bengali). Dhaka: Ministry of Information (Bangladesh). Archived (PDF) from the original on 1 November 2020.
