= Bangladesh National Film Award for Best Dialogue =

National Film Award for Best Dialogue জাতীয় চলচ্চিত্র শ্রেষ্ঠ সংলাপ রচয়িতা
- Awarded for: Contribution of Bangladeshi cinema in dialogue.
- Location: Dhaka
- Country: Bangladesh
- Presented by: President of Bangladesh
- First award: 1977
- Final award: 2013
- Website: moi.gov.bd

The Bangladesh National Film Award for Best Dialogue (Bengali: বাংলাদেশ জাতীয় চলচ্চিত্র পুরস্কার শ্রেষ্ঠ সংলাপ রচয়িতা) is one of the most honourable film awards in Bangladesh. Since 1978, the awards have been given for best dialogue. The first award winner was Subhash Dutta.

== List of winners ==
Year	Name of Winner	Film	Ref
1977	Subhash Dutta	Simana Periye	
1978	Amjad Hossain	Golapi Ekhon Traine	
1979	Amjad Hossain	Sundori	
1980	Syed Salahuddin Zaki	Ghuddi	
1981	No Award		
1982	Syed Shamsul Haque	Boro Valo Lok Chilo	
1983	Syed Shamsul Haque	Award	
1984	Amjad Hossain	Bhat De	
1985	No Award		
1986	No Award		
1987	No Award		
1988	No Award		
1989	Chatku Ahmed	Satya Mithya	
1990	No Award		
1991	Barun Shankor	Santona	
1992	Kazi Hayat	Trash	
1993	Selim Al Deen	Ekattorer Jishu	
1994	Humayun Ahmed	Aguner Poroshmoni	
1995	Tanvir Mokammel	Nadir Naam Modhumoti	
1996	Dilip Biswas	Ajante	
1997	No Award		
1998	No Award		
1999	Tanvir Mokammel	Chitra Nadir Pare	
2000	Abu Saeed and Selim Al Deen	Kittonkhola	
2001	Tanvir Mokammel	Lalsalu	
2002	No Award		
2003	No Award		
2004	No Award		
2005	No Award		
2006	Kazi Morshed	Ghani	
2007	No Award		
2008	Murad Parvez	Chandragrohon	
2009	Mustaba Saud	Chander Moto Bou	
2010	Jakir Hossain Raju	Bhalobaslei Ghor Bandha Jay Na	
2011	Nasiruddin Yousuff and Ebadur Rahman	Guerrilla	
2012	Redwan Rony	Chorabali	
2013	Gazi Rakayet	Mrittika Maya	
2014	Zahidur Rahman Anjan	Meghmallar	
2015	Humayun Ahmed	Anil Bagchir Ekdin	
2016	Rubaiyat Hossain	Under Construction	
2017	Badrul Anam Saud	Gohin Baluchor	
2018	SM Haroon-or-Rashid	Putro	
2019	Jakir Hossain Raju	Moner Moto Manush Pailam Na	
2020	Fakhrul Arefeen Khan	Gondi	
2021	Tauquir Ahmed	Sphulingo	
2022	S A Haque Olike	Golui	

== Records and statistics ==
=== Multiple wins ===
The following individuals received two or more Best Film Dialogue awards:

Wins	Dialogue	Film
3	Amjad Hossain	Golapi Ekhon Traine (1978); Sundori (1979); Bhat De (1984)
3	Tanvir Mokammel	Nadir Naam Modhumoti (1995); Chitra Nadir Pare (1999); Lalsalu (2001)

== See also ==
- Bangladesh National Film Award for Best Film
- Bangladesh National Film Award for Best Story
