= Bangladesh National Film Award for Best Supporting Actress =

Bangladesh Film Award

National Film Award for Best Supporting Actress
- Awarded for: Excellence in cinematic achievements for Bangladeshi cinema
- Sponsored by: Government of Bangladesh
- Location: Dhaka
- Country: Bangladesh
- Presented by: Ministry of Information
- First award: 1975 (1st)
- Final award: 2023 (48th)
- Currently held by: Nazia Haque Orsha (2023)

Highlights
- Most awards: Anwara Begum (7 wins)
- Total awarded: 42
- First winner: Rosy Afsari (1975)
- Website: moi.gov.bd

Bangladesh National Film Award for Best Supporting Actress is the highest award for film actresses in a supporting role in Bangladesh.

== List of winners ==
Key

Symbol	Meaning
†	Indicates a joint award for that year

List of award recipients, showing the year, role(s) and film(s)
Year (Note: Denotes The year in which the film was censored by Bangladesh Film Censor Board.)	Recipient(s)	Role(s)	Work(s)	Ref
1975 (1st)	Rosy Afsari	Kader's Wife	Lathial	
1976 (2nd)	Rawshan Jamil	Buri	Noyonmoni	
1977 (3rd)	Shabana		Janani	
1978 (4th)	Anwara Begum	Moina	Golapi Ekhon Traine	
1979 (5th)	Anwara Begum	Bindia	Sundori	
1980 (6th)	Rozina		Koshai	
1981	No Award			
1982 (7th)	Ayesha Akter	Topon's Mother	Rajanigandha	
1983 (8th)	Suborna Mustafa		Notun Bou	
1984 (9th)	Anwara Begum		Sokhinar Juddho	
1985 (10th)	Rehana Jolly	Momota	Ma o Chhele	
1986 (11th)	Jinat	Lolona	Shuvoda	
1987 (12th)	Parveen Sultana Diti	Sabina	Swami Stree	
1988 (13th)	Suborna Shirin		Biraj Bou	
1989 (14th)	Khaleda Aktar Kolpona		Jiner Badshah	
1990 (15th)	Anwara Begum	Doctor	Moroner Pore	
1991 (16th)	Nuton	Eva	Streer Paona	
1992 (17th)	Anwara Begum		Radha Krishna	
1993 (18th)	Anwara Begum		Banglar Badhu	
1994 (19th)	Anwara Begum	Mrs. Fatema Rawshan Chowdhury	Ontore Ontore	
1995 (20th)	Shanta Islam		Anya Jibon	
1996 (21st)	Not Given			
1997 (22nd)	Rokeya Prachy	Buli	Dukhai	
1998 (23nd)	Not Given			
1999 (24th)	Rawshan Jamil	Anuprova	Chitra Nodir Pare	
2000 (25th)	Tamalika Karmakar	Dalimon	Kittonkhola	
2001 (26th)	Mehbooba Mahnoor Chandni	Jamila	Lalsalu	
2002 (27th)	Bobita	Hurmat Jahan Bibi	Hason Raja	
2003 (28th)	Yasmin Bilkis Sathi	Mehnaz	Bir Soinik	
2004 (29th)	Mehbooba Mahnoor Chandni	Marium	Joyjatra	
2005 (30th)	Champa	Radha	Shasti	
2006 (31st)	Doli Johur	Rokeya	Ghani	
2007 (32nd)	Nipun Akter		Saajghor	
2008 (33rd) †	Dilara Zaman	Moyra Mashi	Chandragrohon	
2008 (33rd) †	Champa	Pagli	Chandragrohon	
2009 (34th)	Nipun Akter	Priya	Chander Moto Bou	
2010 (35th)	Rumana Khan		Bhalobaslei Ghor Bandha Jay Na	
2011 (36th)	Bobita		Ke Apon Ke Por	
2012 (37th)	Lucy Tripti Gomes	Ambia	Uttarer Sur	
2013 (38th)	Aparna Ghosh	Fahmida	Mrittika Maya	
2014 (39th)	Chitralekha Guho	Hashem's mother	'71 Er Ma Jononi	
2015 (40th)	Toma Mirza	Chhaya	Nodijon	
2016 (42nd)	Tania Ahmed	Zeba	Krishnopokkho	
2017 (42nd) †	Suborna Mustafa	Aasma	Gohin Baluchor	
2017 (42nd) †	Runa Khan	Jui	Haldaa	
2018 (43rd)	Shuchorita		Meghkanna	
2019 (44th)	Nargis Akhter		Maya: The Lost Mother	
2020 (45th)	Aparna Ghosh		Gondi	
2021 (46th)	Shampa Reza		Padmapuran	
2022 (47th)	Afsana Mimi		Paap Punno	
2023 (48th)	Nazia Haque Orsha	Aporajita	Ora 7 Jon	

== Records and statistics ==
=== Multiple wins and nominations ===
The following individuals received two or more actress in a supporting role awards:

Wins	Recepents	Works
7	Anwara Begum	Golapi Ekhon Traine (1978); Sundori (1979); Sokhinar Juddho (1984); Moroner Pore (1990); Radha Krishna (1992); Banglar Badhu (1993); Ontore Ontore (1994)
2	Mehbooba Mahnoor Chandni	Lalsalu (2001); Joyjatra (2004)
2	Bobita	Hason Raja (2002); Ke Apon Ke Por (2011)
2	Champa	Shasti (2005); Chandragrohon (2008)
2	Suborna Mustafa	Notun Bou (1983); Gohin Baluchor (2017)

== See also ==
- Bangladesh National Film Award for Best Supporting Actor
- Bangladesh National Film Award for Best Actor
- Bangladesh National Film Award for Best Actress

== Sources ==
- BFDC (2012). "List of National Film Award recipients name 1975-2012" (PDF). Bangladesh Film Development Corporation (in Bengali). Dhaka: Ministry of Information (Bangladesh). pp. 1–23. Archived from the original (PDF) on 1 November 2020.
- BFDC (2013). "National Film Award 2013". Bangladesh Film Development Corporation (in Bengali). Dhaka: Ministry of Information (Bangladesh). Archived from the original on 18 September 2020.
- BFDC (2014). "National Film Award 2014". Bangladesh Film Development Corporation (in Bengali). Dhaka: Ministry of Information (Bangladesh). Archived from the original on 18 September 2020.
- BFDC (2015). "National Film Award 2015" (PDF). Bangladesh Film Development Corporation (in Bengali). Dhaka: Ministry of Information (Bangladesh).
- BFDC (2016). "National Film Award 2016" (PDF). Bangladesh Film Development Corporation (in Bengali). Dhaka: Ministry of Information (Bangladesh).
- BFDC (2018). "National Film Award 2017-2018" (PDF). Bangladesh Film Development Corporation (in Bengali). Dhaka: Ministry of Information (Bangladesh). Archived (PDF) from the original on 2020-11-01.
