= Bangladesh National Film Award for Best Actress =

Film awards

National Film Awards for Best Actress
- Awarded for: Excellence in cinematic achievements for Bangladeshi cinema
- Sponsored by: Government of Bangladesh
- Location: Dhaka
- Country: Bangladesh
- Presented by: Ministry of Information
- First award: 1975 (1st)
- Final award: 2023 (48th)
- Currently held by: Aynun Nahar Putul

Highlights
- Most awards: Shabana (8 wins)
- First winner: Bobita (1975)
- Website: moi.gov.bd

Bangladesh National Film Award for Best Actress (Bengali: জাতীয় চলচ্চিত্র পুরস্কার শ্রেষ্ঠ অভিনেত্রীর) is the highest award for film actresses in Bangladesh.

== List of winners ==
List of award recipients, showing the year, role(s), film(s) and language(s)
Year (Note: Denotes The year in which the film was censored by Bangladesh Film Censor Board.)	Recipient(s)	Role(s)	Work(s)	Ref
1975 (1st)	Bobita	Chadni	Bandi Theke Begum	
1976 (2nd)	Bobita	Moni	Noyonmoni	
1977 (3rd)	Bobita	Chobi	Bosundhora	
1978 (4th)	Kabori Sarwar	Nobitun	Sareng Bou	
1979 (5th)	Dolly Anwar	Jaigun	Surja Dighal Bari	
1980 (6th)	Shabana		Sokhi Tumi Kar	
1981	No Award			
1982 (7th)	Shabana	Kushum	Dui Poisar Alta	
1983 (8th)	Shabana	Najma Rahman	Najma	
1984 (9th)	Shabana	Josi	Bhat De	
1985 (10th)	Bobita	Narayani / Boudi	Ramer Sumoti	
1986 (11th)	Anwara Begum	Shuvoda	Shuvoda	
1986 (11th)	Anjana Sultana	Lolita	Parineeta	
1987 (12th)	Shabana		Opekkha	
1988 (13th)	Rozina		Jibondhara	
1989 (14th)	Shabana	Rokeya	Ranga Bhabi	
1990 (15th)	Shabana	Sathi	Moroner Pore	
1991 (16th)	Shabana	Momota	Ochena	
1992 (17th)	Dolly Johur	Rabeya / Emma	Shonkhonil Karagar	
1993 (18th)	Champa	Mala	Padma Nadir Majhi	
1994 (19th)	Bipasha Hayat	Ratri	Aguner Poroshmoni	
1995 (20th)	Champa		Anya Jibon	
1996 (21st)	Shabnaz	Rani	Nirmom	
1997 (22nd)	Shuchorita	Buri	Hangor Nodi Grenade	
1998 (23nd)	Not Given			
1999 (24th)	Shimla	Fuli / Shimla	Madam Fuli	
2000 (25th)	Champa		Uttarer Khep	
2001 (26th)	Moushumi	Meghla	Meghla Akash	
2002 (27th)	Not Given			
2003 (28th)	Sadika Parvin Popy	Parul	Karagar	
2004 (29th)	Aupee Karim	Sathi	Bachelor	
2005 (30th)	Shabnur	Sejuti	Dui Noyoner Alo	
2006 (31st)	Naznin Hasan Chumki	Moyna	Ghani	
2007 (32nd)	Zakia Bari Mamo	Jori	Daruchini Dip	
2008 (33rd)	Sadika Parvin Popy	Rodela	Megher Koley Rod	
2009 (34th)	Sadika Parvin Popy	Sudhamoni	Gangajatra	
2010 (35th)	Purnima	Setu	Ora Amake Bhalo Hote Dilo Na	
2011 (36th)	Jaya Ahsan	Bilkish Banu	Guerrilla	
2012 (37th)	Jaya Ahsan	Noboni	Chorabali	
2013 (38th)	Moushumi	Chandramukhi	Devdas	
2013 (38th)	Shormi Mala	Poddo	Mrittika Maya	
2014 (39th)	Moushumi		Taarkata	
2014 (39th)	Bidya Sinha Saha Mim	Kabita	Jonakir Aalo	
2015 (40th)	Jaya Ahsan	Saniya	Zero Degree	
2016 (41st)	Nusrat Imrose Tisha	Pori	Ostitto	
2016 (41st)	Kusum Sikder	Laila	Shankhachil	
2017 (42nd)	Nusrat Imrose Tisha	Hashu	Haldaa	
2018 (43rd)	Jaya Ahsan	Ranu	Debi	
2019 (44th)	Sunerah Binte Kamal	Ayesha	No Dorai	
2020 (45th)	Deepanwita Martin	Honufa	Gor (The Grave)	
2021 (46th)	Azmeri Haque Badhon	Rehana Maryam Noor	Rehana Maryam Noor	
2021 (46th)	Tasnova Tamanna	Tuni	Nonajoler Kabbo	
2022 (47th)	Jaya Ahsan	Beauty	Beauty Circus	
2022 (47th)	Reekita Nondine Shimu	Shimu	Shimu	
2023 (48th)	Aynun Nahar Putul	Putul	Saatao	

== Records and statistics ==
=== Multiple wins ===
The following individuals received two or more Best Actress awards:

Wins	Recepent(s)	Films
8	Shabana	Sokhi Tumi Kar (1980); Dui Poisar Alta (1982); Najma (1983); Bhat De (1984); Apeksha (1987); Ranga Bhabi (1989); Moroner Pore (1990); Achena (1991)
6	Jaya Ahsan	Guerrilla (2011); Chorabali(2012); Zero Degree (2015); Alatchakra (2021); Debi (2018); Beauty Circus (2022)
4	Bobita	Bandi Keno Kande (1975); Noyonmoni (1976); Basundhara (1977); Ramer Sumoti (1985)
3	Champa	Padma Nadir Majhi (1993); Anya Jibon (1995); Uttarer Khep (2000)
3	Sadika Parvin Popy	Karagar (2003); Megher Kole Rod (2008); Gongajatra (2009)
3	Moushumi	Meghla Akash (2001); Devdas (2013); Taarkata (2014)
2	Nusrat Imrose Tisha	Ostitto (2016); Haldaa (2017)

== See also ==
- Bangladesh National Film Award for Best Actor
- Bangladesh National Film Award for Best Supporting Actor
- Bangladesh National Film Award for Best Supporting Actress
