= Bangladesh National Film Award for Best Actor =

National Film Awards for Best Actor
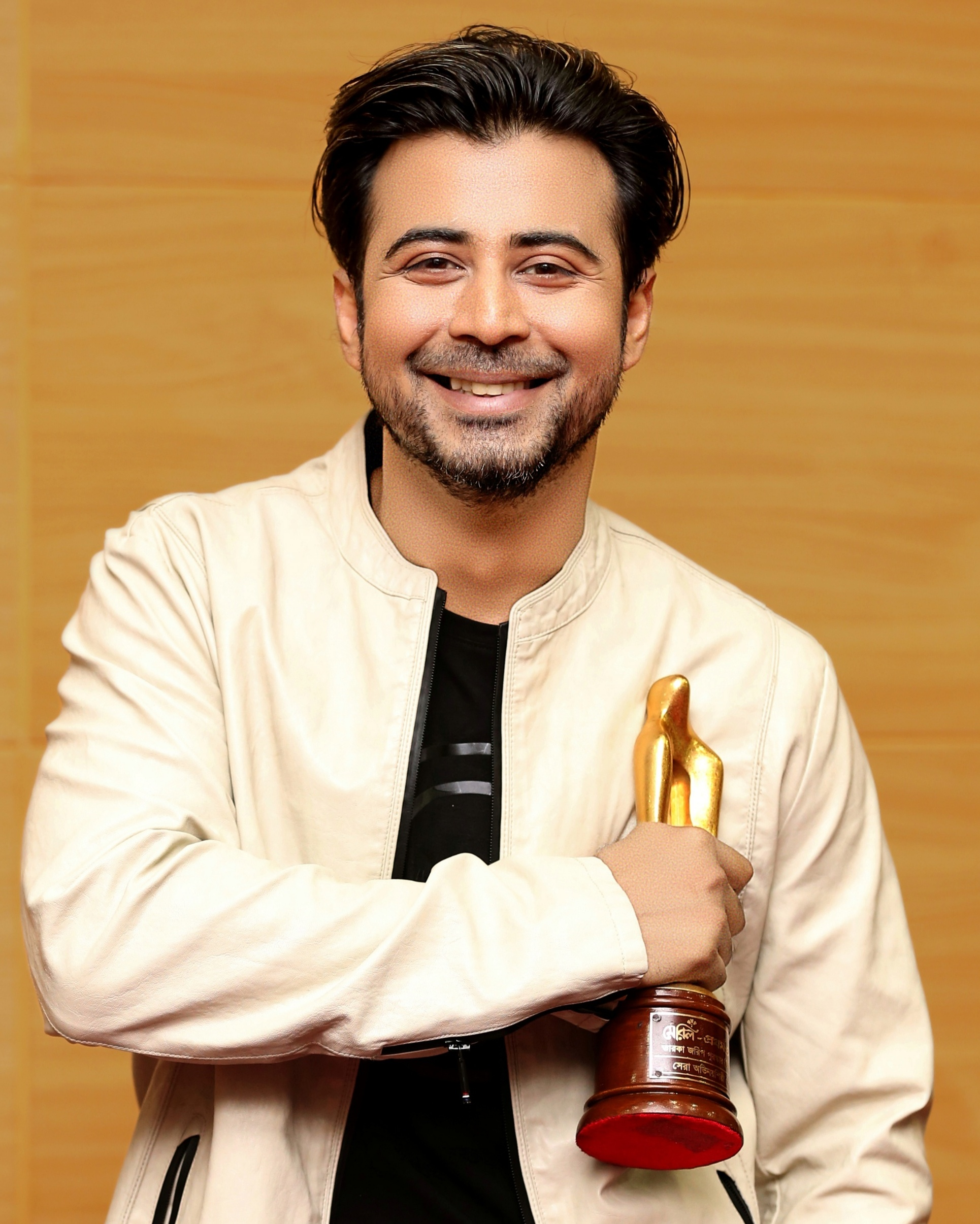
- The 2023 recipient: Afran Nisho
- Awarded for: Excellence in cinematic achievements for Bangladeshi cinema
- Sponsored by: Government of Bangladesh
- Location: Dhaka
- Country: Bangladesh
- Presented by: Ministry of Information
- First award: 1976 (1st)
- Final award: 2023 (48th)
- Currently held by: Afran Nisho

Highlights
- Most awards: Alamgir (7 wins)
- First winner: Anwar Hossain (1975)
- Website: moi.gov.bd

Bangladesh National Film Award for Best Actor is the highest award for film acting in Bangladesh.

== List of winners ==
List of award recipients, showing the year, role(s) and film(s)
Year (Note: Denotes The year in which the film was censored by Bangladesh Film Censor Board.)	Recipient(s)	Role(s)	Work(s)	Ref
1975 (1st)	Anwar Hossain	Kader Lathial	Lathial	
1976 (2nd)	Abdur Razzak	Badshah	Ki Je Kori	
1977 (3rd)	Bulbul Ahmed	Kalu	Simana Periye	
1978 (4th)	Abdur Razzak	Rahmat	Ashikkhito	
1978 (4th)	Bulbul Ahmed	Sagor	Badhu Biday	
1979 (5th)	Not Given			
1980 (6th)	Bulbul Ahmed	Imran	Shesh Uttar	
1981	No Award			
1982 (7th)	Abdur Razzak	Yasin	Boro Bhalo Lok Chhilo	
1983 (8th)	Sohel Rana	Lalu	Lalu Bhulu	
1984 (9th)	Abdur Razzak	Chandranath	Chandranath	
1985 (10th)	Alamgir		Ma o Chhele	
1986 (11th)	Golam Mustafa	Poran	Shuvoda	
1986 (11th)	Ilias Kanchan	Shekhar Roy	Parineeta	
1987 (12th)	Alamgir		Opekkha	
1987 (12th)	ATM Shamsuzzaman	Kodom Ali	Dayee Ke?	
1988 (13th)	Abdur Razzak	Shahed Chowdhury	Jogajog	
1989 (14th)	Alamgir	Alam	Khotipuron	
1990 (15th)	Alamgir	Sagar	Moroner Pore	
1991 (16th)	Alamgir		Pita Mata Sontan	
1992 (17th)	Alamgir		Andho Biswas	
1993 (18th)	Raisul Islam Asad	Kuber	Padma Nadir Majhi	
1994 (19th)	Alamgir		Desh Premik	
1995 (20th)	Raisul Islam Asad		Anya Jibon	
1996 (21st)	Sohel Rana	Asad	Ajante	
1997 (22nd)	Raisul Islam Asad	Dukhai	Dukhai	
1998 (23nd)	Ferdous Ahmed	Ajit	Hothat Brishti	
1999 (24th)	Zahid Hasan	Moti/Gatok	Srabon Megher Din	
2000 (25th)	Riaz	Mystery Man	Dui Duari	
2001 (26th)	Raisul Islam Asad	Abdul Mojid	Lalsalu	
2002 (27th)	Kazi Maruf	Maruf	Itihas	
2003 (28th)	Manna	Mohammad Ali / Abdullah	Bir Soinik	
2004 (29th)	Humayun Faridi	Jabbar	Matritwa	
2005 (30th)	Mahfuz Ahmed	Tuhin Mahmud Sobuj	Lal Sabuj	
2006 (31st)	Arman Parvez Murad	Bozlu	Ghani	
2007 (32nd)	Riaz	Shuvro/Kanababa	Daruchini Dip	
2008 (33rd)	Riaz	Sagor	Ki Jadu Korila	
2009 (34th)	Chanchal Chowdhury	Sonai	Monpura	
2009 (34th)	Ferdous Ahmed	Prokash	Gangajatra	
2010 (35th)	Shakib Khan	Turjo Khan	Bhalobaslei Ghor Bandha Jay Na	
2011 (36th)	Ferdous Ahmed	Hashem	Kusum Kusum Prem	
2012 (37th)	Shakib Khan	Munna / Sidor	Khodar Pore Ma	
2013 (38th)	Titas Zia	Boishakh	Mrittika Maya	
2014 (39th)	Ferdous Ahmed		Ek Cup Cha	
2015 (40th)	Shakib Khan	Shakib Khan	Aro Bhalobashbo Tomay	
2015 (40th)	Mahfuz Ahmed	Amit	Zero Degree	
2016 (41st)	Chanchal Chowdhury	Sharafat Karim Ayna	Aynabaji	
2017 (42nd)	Shakib Khan	Sabuz	Swatta	
2017 (42nd)	Arifin Shuvoo	Abid Rahman	Dhaka Attack	
2018 (43rd)	Ferdous Ahmed		Putro	
2018 (43rd)	Symon Sadik	Aslam/ iftikhar	Jannat	
2019 (44th)	Tariq Anam Khan	Imran Chowdhury	Abar Boshonto	
2020 (45th)	Siam Ahmed	Shadhin	Bishwoshundori	
2021 (46th)	Siam Ahmed	Ashfaqul Mridha	Mridha Bonam Mridha	
2021 (46th)	Mir Sabbir		Raat Jaha Phool	
2022 (47th)	Chanchal Chowdhury	Chaan Majhi	Hawa	
2023 (48th)	Afran Nisho	Masud	Surongo	

== Records and statistics ==
=== Multiple wins and nominations ===
The following individuals received two or more Best Actor awards:

Wins	Actors	Film(s)
7	Alamgir	Ma o Chhele (1985); Opekkha (1987); Khotipuron (1989); Moroner Pore (1990); Pita Mata Santan (1991); Andho Bishwas (1992); Desh Premik (1994)
5	Abdur Razzak	Ki Je Kori (1976); Ashikkhito (1978); Boro Bhalo Lok Chhilo (1982); Chandranath (1984); Jogajog (1988)
5	Ferdous Ahmed	Hothat Brishti (1998); Gangajatra (2009); Kusum Kusum Prem (2011); Ek Cup Cha (2014); Putro (2018)
4	Raisul Islam Asad	Padma Nadir Majhi (1993); Anya Jibon (1995); Dukhai (1997); Lalsalu (2001)
4	Shakib Khan	Bhalobaslei Ghor Bandha Jay Na (2010); Khodar Pore Ma (2012); Aro Bhalobashbo Tomay (2015); Swatta (2017)
3	Bulbul Ahmed	Simana Periye (1977); Badhu Biday (1978); Shesh Uttar (1980)
3	Riaz	Dui Duari (2000); Daruchini Dip (2007); Ki Jadu Korila (2008)
3	Chanchal Chowdhury	Monpura (2009); Aynabaji (2016); Hawa (2022)
2	Sohel Rana	Lalu Bhulu (1983); Ajante (1996)
2	Mahfuz Ahmed	Lal Sabuj (2005); Zero Degree (2015)
2	Siam Ahmed	Bishwoshundori (2020); Mridha Bonam Mridha (2021)

== See also ==
- Bangladesh National Film Award for Best Actress
- Bangladesh National Film Award for Best Supporting Actor
- Bangladesh National Film Award for Best Supporting Actress

== Sources ==
- BFDC (2012). "List of National Film Award recipients name 1975-2012" (PDF). Bangladesh Film Development Corporation (in Bengali). Dhaka: Ministry of Information (Bangladesh). pp. 1–23. Archived from the original (PDF) on 1 November 2020.
- BFDC (2013). "National Film Award 2013". Bangladesh Film Development Corporation (in Bengali). Dhaka: Ministry of Information (Bangladesh). Archived from the original on 18 September 2020.
- BFDC (2014). "National Film Award 2014". Bangladesh Film Development Corporation (in Bengali). Dhaka: Ministry of Information (Bangladesh). Archived from the original on 18 September 2020.
- BFDC (2015). "National Film Award 2015" (PDF). Bangladesh Film Development Corporation (in Bengali). Dhaka: Ministry of Information (Bangladesh).
- BFDC (2016). "National Film Award 2016" (PDF). Bangladesh Film Development Corporation (in Bengali). Dhaka: Ministry of Information (Bangladesh).
- BFDC (2018). "National Film Award 2017-2018" (PDF). Bangladesh Film Development Corporation (in Bengali). Dhaka: Ministry of Information (Bangladesh). Archived (PDF) from the original on 1 November 2020.
- BFDC (2020). "National Film Award 2019" (PDF). Bangladesh Film Development Corporation (in Bengali). Dhaka: Ministry of Information (Bangladesh). Archived (PDF) from the original on 5 December 2020.
