= Bangladesh National Film Award for Best Story =

Bangladesh National Film Award for Best Story জাতীয় চলচ্চিত্র পুরস্কার শ্রেষ্ঠ কাহিনীকার
- Awarded for: Best Story
- Location: Dhaka
- Country: Bangladesh
- Presented by: President of Bangladesh
- First award: 1977
- Final award: 2022
- Website: moi.gov.bd

The Bangladesh National Film Award for Best Story (Bengali: বাংলাদেশ জাতীয় চলচ্চিত্র পুরস্কার শ্রেষ্ঠ কাহিনীকার) is one of the most prestigious film awards given in Bangladesh. Since 1977, awards have been given in the category of best story.

== List of winners ==
Year	Name of Winner	Film	Notes
1977	Alauddin Al Azad	Bosundhora	
1978	No Award		
1979	No Award		
1980	No Award		
1981	Not given		
1982	No Award		
1983	No Award		
1984	No Award		
1985	Sheikh Niamat Ali	Dahon	
1986	No Award		
1987	Kazi Hayat	Dayi Ke?	
1988	No Award		
1989	No Award		
1990	No Award		
1991	Mohiuddin Ahmad	Padma Meghna Jamuna	
1992	Humayun Ahmed	Shankhonil Karagar	
1993	Kazi Hayat	Chadabaz	
1994	Humayun Ahmed	Aguner Poroshmoni	
1995	Tanvir Mokammel	Nadir Naam Madhumoti	
1996	Selina Hossain	Poka Makorer Ghor Bosoti	
1997	Selina Hossain	Hangor Nadi Granad	
1998	No Award		
1999	Tanvir Mokammel	Chitra Nodir Pare	
2000	Selim Al Deen	Kittankhola	
2001	Syed Waliullah	Lal Salu	Posthumous
2002	No Award		
2003	Giasuddin Selim	Adhiar	
2004	Amjad Hossain	Joyjatra	
2005	Zahir Raihan	Hajar Bosor Dhore	Posthumous
2006	Kazi Morshed	Ghani	
2007	No Award		
2008	Mohammad Rafikuzzaman	Megher Koley Rod	
2009	Syed Wahid Diamond	Gangajatra	
2010	Jakir Hossain Raju	Bhalobaslei Ghor Bandha Jay Na	
2011	Muhammed Zafar Iqbal	Amar Bondhu Rashed	
2012	Shahnewaz Kakoli	Uttorer Sur	
2013	Gazi Rakayet	Mrittika Maya	
2014	Zahidur Rahman Anjan	Meghmallar	
2015	Masum Reza	Bapjaner Bioscope	
2016	Tauquir Ahmed	Oggatonama	
2017	Azad Bulbul	Haldaa	
2018	Sudipto Saeed Khan	Jannat	
2019	Masud Pathik	Maya: The Lost Mother	
2020	Gazi Rakayet	Gor (The Grave)	
2021	Rezwan Shahriar Sumit	Nonajoler Kabbo	
2022	Faridur Reza Sagar & Khorshed Alam Khosru	Damal & Golui	
2023	Nazim Ud Daula and Raihan Rafi	Surongo	

== See also ==
- Bangladesh National Film Award for Best Film
