= Bangladesh National Film Award for Best Supporting Actor =

Bangladesh Film Award

National Film Award for Best Supporting Actor
- Awarded for: Excellence in cinematic achievements for Bangladeshi cinema
- Sponsored by: Government of Bangladesh
- Location: Dhaka
- Country: Bangladesh
- Presented by: Ministry of Information
- First award: 1975 (1st)
- Final award: 2023 (48th)
- Currently held by: Monir Ahmed Shakeel

Highlights
- Most awards: Fazlur Rahman Babu (5 wins)
- First winner: Farooque (1975)
- Website: moi.gov.bd

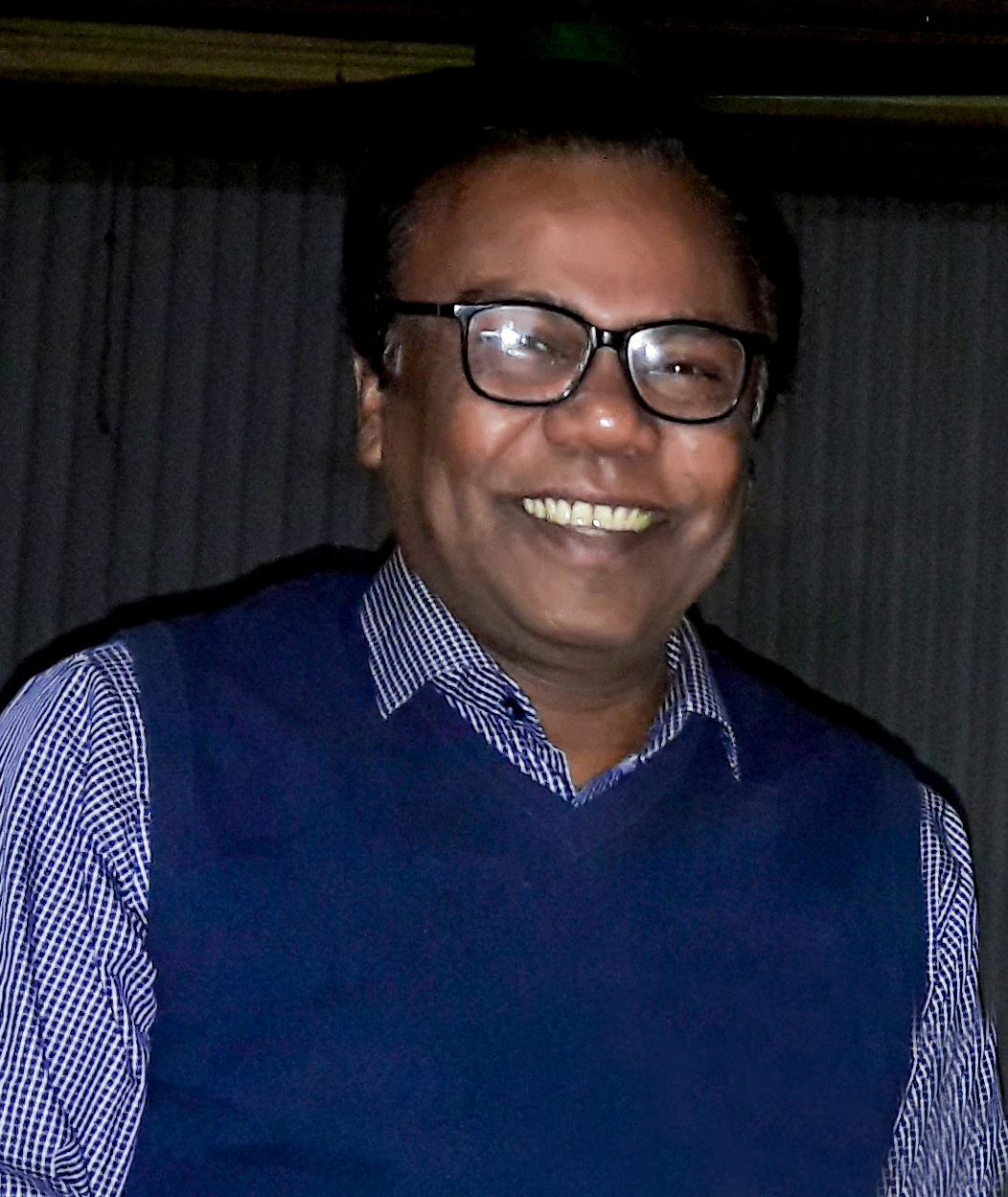

Bangladesh National Film Award for Best Supporting Actor (Bengali: জাতীয় চলচ্চিত্র পুরস্কার) is the highest award for actors in a supporting role in Bangladesh. It was awarded up to now 47 times from 1975 (1st) until 2022 (47th). The actor most often awarded is Fazlur Rahman Babu.

== List of winners ==
Key

| Symbol | Meaning |
|---|---|
| † | Indicates a joint award for that year |

List of award recipients, showing the year, role(s) and film(s)
| Year (Note: Denotes The year in which the film was censored by Bangladesh Film Censor Board.) | Recipient(s) | Role(s) | Work(s) | Ref |
|---|---|---|---|---|
| 1975 (1st) | Farooque | Dukhu Mia | Lathial | |
| 1976 (2nd) | Khalil Ullah Khan | Khairul Alam | Gunda | |
| 1977 (3rd) | Not Given | | | |
| 1978 (4th) | Anwar Hossain | Gayen | Golapi Ekhon Traine | |
| 1979 (5th) | Saifuddin Ahmed | Mithhu | Sundori | |
| 1980 (6th) | Golam Mustafa | | Emiler Goenda Bahini | |
| 1981 | No Award | | | |
| 1982 (7th) | Prabir Mitra | Lokman | Boro Bhalo Lok Chhilo | |
| 1983 (8th) | Shakil | | Puraskar | |
| 1984 (9th) | Sirajul Islam | Moni Khuro | Chandranath | |
| 1985 (10th) | Abul Khair | Mama | Dahan | |
| 1986 (11th) | Ashish Kumar Louho | Gurucharan | Parineeta | |
| 1987 (12th) | Anwar Hossain | | Dayi Ke | |
| 1987 (12th) | Abul Khair | Pachak Bamun | Rajlakshmi Srikanta | |
| 1988 (13th) | Wasimul Bari Rajib | | Heera Moti | |
| 1989 (14th) | Black Anwar | Keramat | Byathar Daan | |
| 1990 (15th) | Golam Mustafa | Pranesh K. Bhatyacharya | Chhutir Phande | |
| 1991 (16th) | Wasimul Bari Rajib | Kalu Miah | Danga | |
| 1992 (17th) | Mizu Ahmed | | Traas | |
| 1993 (18th) | Not Given | | | |
| 1994 (19th) | Amol Bose | | Ajker Protibad | |
| 1995 (20th) | Abul Khair | | Anya Jibon | |
| 1996 (21st) | Bulbul Ahmed | Dipu's father | Dipu Number Two | |
| 1997 (22nd) | Abul Khair | The old man | Dukhai | |
| 1998 (23nd) | Not Given | | | |
| 1999 (24th) | Golam Mustafa | Zaminder | Srabon Megher Din | |
| 2000 (25th) | Wasimul Bari Rajib | | Bidroh Charidike | |
| 2001 (26th) | Not Given | | | |
| 2002 (27th) | Not Given | | | |
| 2003 (28th) | Wasimul Bari Rajib | Habildar Mokbul | Sahoshi Manush Chai | |
| 2003 (28th) | Sohel Rana | Principal Ibrahim Parvez | Sahoshi Manush Chai | |
| 2004 (29th) | Fazlur Rahman Babu | | Shankhonad | |
| 2005 (30th) | Ilias Kanchan | Dukhiram | Shasti | |
| 2006 (31st) | Masum Aziz | Afsu | Ghani | |
| 2006 (31st) | Raisul Islam Asad | Shamsu | Ghani | |
| 2007 (32nd) | Abul Hayat | Sobhan | Daruchini Dip | |
| 2008 (33rd) | Shams Sumon | | Sopnopuron | |
| 2009 (34th) | Shahidul Alam Sachchu | | Britter Baire | |
| 2010 (35th) | Alamgir | Ashraf Chowdhury | Jibon Moroner Sathi | |
| 2011 (36th) | Alamgir | | Ke Apon Ke Por | |
| 2012 (37th) | A.T.M. Shamsuzzaman | Chief Politician | Chorabali | |
| 2013 (38th) | Raisul Islam Asad | Khirmohon | Mrittika Maya | |
| 2014 (39th) | Ejajul Islam | Musa Raj | Taarkata | |
| 2015 (40th) | Gazi Rakayet | Ayub Ali | Anil Bagchir Ekdin | |
| 2016 (42nd) | Ali Raj | | Pure Jay Mon | |
| 2016 (42nd) | Fazlur Rahman Babu | | Meyeti Ekhon Kothay Jabe | |
| 2017 (42nd) | Shahadat Hossain | Mizan | Gohin Baluchor | |
| 2018 (43rd) | Ali Raj | Noor Muhammad | Jannat | |
| 2019 (44th) | Fazlur Rahman Babu | Chandor | Fagun Haway | |
| 2020 (45th) | Fazlur Rahman Babu | | Bishwoshundori | |
| 2021 (46th) | Fazlur Rahman Babu | Chairman | Nonajoler Kabbo | |
| 2022 (47th) | Nasir Uddin Khan | | Poran | |
| 2023 (48th) | Monir Ahmed Shakeel | Bank manager's driver | Surongo | |

== Records and statistics ==
=== Multiple wins ===
The following individuals received two or more Best Supporting Actor awards:

| Wins | Singer | Film |
|---|---|---|
| 5 | Fazlur Rahman Babu | Shankhonad (2004); Meyeti Ekhon Kothay Jabe (2016); Fagun Haway (2019); Bishwoshundori (2020); Nonajoler Kabbo (2021) |
| 4 | Abul Khair | Dahan (1985); Rajlaxmi-Srikanta (1987); Anya Jibon (1995); Dukhai (1997) |
| 4 | Wasimul Bari Rajib | Heeramoti (1988); Danga (1991); Bidroh Charidike (2000); Sahoshi Manush Chai (2003) |
| 3 | Golam Mustafa | Emiler Goenda Bahini (1980); Chhutir Phande (1990); Srabon Megher Din (1999) |
| 2 | Anwar Hossain | Golapi Ekhon Traine (1978); Dayi Ke (1987) |
| 2 | Raisul Islam Asad | Ghani (2006); Mrittika Maya (2013) |
| 2 | Alamgir | Jibon Moroner Sathi (2010); Ke Apon Ke Por (2011) |
| 2 | Ali Raj | Pure Jay Mon (2016); Jannat (2018) |

== See also ==
- Bangladesh National Film Award for Best Supporting Actress
- Bangladesh National Film Award for Best Actor
- Bangladesh National Film Award for Best Actress

== Sources ==
- BFDC (2012). "List of National Film Award recipients name 1975-2012" (PDF). Bangladesh Film Development Corporation (in Bengali). Dhaka: Ministry of Information (Bangladesh). pp. 1–23. Archived from the original (PDF) on 1 November 2020.
- BFDC (2013). "National Film Award 2013". Bangladesh Film Development Corporation (in Bengali). Dhaka: Ministry of Information (Bangladesh). Archived from the original on 18 September 2020.
- BFDC (2014). "National Film Award 2014". Bangladesh Film Development Corporation (in Bengali). Dhaka: Ministry of Information (Bangladesh). Archived from the original on 18 September 2020.
- BFDC (2015). "National Film Award 2015" (PDF). Bangladesh Film Development Corporation (in Bengali). Dhaka: Ministry of Information (Bangladesh).
- BFDC (2016). "National Film Award 2016" (PDF). Bangladesh Film Development Corporation (in Bengali). Dhaka: Ministry of Information (Bangladesh).
- BFDC (2018). "National Film Award 2017-2018" (PDF). Bangladesh Film Development Corporation (in Bengali). Dhaka: Ministry of Information (Bangladesh). Archived (PDF) from the original on 1 November 2020.
- BFDC (2020). "National Film Award 2019" (PDF). Bangladesh Film Development Corporation (in Bengali). Dhaka: Ministry of Information (Bangladesh). Archived (PDF) from the original on 5 December 2020.
