= Bangladesh National Film Award for Best Performance in a Comic Role =

National Film Award for Best Performance in a Comic Role
- Awarded for: Excellence in cinematic achievements for Bangladeshi cinema
- Sponsored by: Government of Bangladesh
- Location: Dhaka
- Country: Bangladesh
- Presented by: Ministry of Information
- First award: 1999 (24th)
- Final award: 2019 (44th)
- Currently held by: Zahid Hasan (2019)

Highlights
- Most awards: ATM Shamsuzzaman (3 wins)
- Total awarded: 9
- First winner: ATM Shamsuzzaman (1999)
- Website: moi.gov.bd

The Bangladesh National Film Award for Best Performance in a Comic Role (Bengali: বাংলাদেশ জাতীয় চলচ্চিত্র পুরস্কার শ্রেষ্ঠ কৌতুক অভিনেতা) is one of the highest film awards in Bangladesh.

== List of winners ==
Key

Symbol	Meaning
†	Indicates a joint award for that year

List of award recipients, showing the year, role(s) and film(s)
Year (Note: Denotes The year in which the film was censored by Bangladesh Film Censor Board.)	Recipient(s)	Role(s)	Work(s)	Ref
1999 (24th)	ATM Shamsuzzaman	Baba	Madam Fuli	
2000 (25th)	Not Given			
2001 (26th)	ATM Shamsuzzaman		Churiwala	
2002 (27th)	Not Given			
2003 (28th)	Dildar	Gittu	Tumi Shudhu Amar	
2004 (29th)	Not Given			
2005 (30th)	Not Given			
2006 (31st)	Not Given			
2007 (32nd)	Not Given			
2008 (33rd)	Not Given			
2009 (34th)	ATM Shamsuzzaman		Mon Boshena Porar Tebile	
2010 (35th)	Afzal Sharif		Nissash Amar Tumi	
2011 (36th)	Not Given			
2012 (37th)	Not Given			
2013 (38th)	Not Given			
2014 (39th)	Misha Sawdagor	Bishu	Olpo Olpo Premer Golpo	
2015 (40th)	Not Given			
2016 (41st)	Not Given			
2017 (42nd)	Fazlur Rahman Babu	Monu Miya	Gohin Baluchor	
2018 (43rd) †	Mosharraf Karim	Mofizul	Komola Rocket	
2018 (43rd) †	Afzal Sharif		Pobitro Bhalobasha	
2019 (44th)	Not Given			

== See also ==
- Bangladesh National Film Award for Best Performance in a Negative Role
- Bangladesh National Film Award for Best Actor
- Bangladesh National Film Award for Best Actress
- Bangladesh National Film Award for Best Supporting Actor
- Bangladesh National Film Award for Best Supporting Actress

== Sources ==
- BFDC (2012). "List of National Film Award recipients name 1975-2012" (PDF). Bangladesh Film Development Corporation (in Bengali). Dhaka: Ministry of Information (Bangladesh). pp. 1–23. Archived from the original (PDF) on 1 November 2020.
- BFDC (2013). "National Film Award 2013". Bangladesh Film Development Corporation (in Bengali). Dhaka: Ministry of Information (Bangladesh). Archived from the original on 18 September 2020.
- BFDC (2014). "National Film Award 2014". Bangladesh Film Development Corporation (in Bengali). Dhaka: Ministry of Information (Bangladesh). Archived from the original on 18 September 2020.
- BFDC (2015). "National Film Award 2015" (PDF). Bangladesh Film Development Corporation (in Bengali). Dhaka: Ministry of Information (Bangladesh).
- BFDC (2016). "National Film Award 2016" (PDF). Bangladesh Film Development Corporation (in Bengali). Dhaka: Ministry of Information (Bangladesh).
- BFDC (2018). "National Film Award 2017-2018" (PDF). Bangladesh Film Development Corporation (in Bengali). Dhaka: Ministry of Information (Bangladesh). Archived (PDF) from the original on 2020-11-01.
