= Adnan (actor) =

Bangladeshi film actor (fl. 1976- )

- আদনান
- Born: Master Adnan
- Occupation: Film actor
- Years active: 1976–unknown
- Notable work: Megher Onek Rong
- Awards: National Film Award (1st time)

Adnan (popularly known as Master Adnan) is a Bangladeshi film actor. He won Bangladesh National Film Award for Best Child Artist for the film Megher Onek Rong (1976). Adnan was the first awardee of best child artist category in 1976.

== Selected films ==
- Megher Onek Rong (1976)

== Awards and nominations ==
National Film Awards

Year	Award	Category	Film	Result
1976	National Film Award	Best Child Artist	Megher Onek Rong	Won
