= Sajib =

Bangladeshi actor

- সজিব
- Occupation: Film actor
- Years active: 1975–1980
- Notable work: Surja Dighal Bari
- Awards: National Film Award (1st time)

Sajib (popularly known as Master Sajib) is a Bangladeshi film and television actor. He shared the Bangladesh National Film Award for Best Child Artist for the film Surja Dighal Bari (1979) with Elora Gohor.

== Selected films ==
- Angaar (2016 film)|Angaar (2016)
- Dhaka Attack (2017)
- Dhat Teri Ki (2017)
- Abhagi - 1975
- Surja Dighal Bari - 1979
- Gangchil - 1980

== Awards and nominations ==
National Film Awards

Year	Award	Category	Film	Result
1979	National Film Award	Best Child Artist	Surja Dighal Bari	Won
