= List of awards and nominations received by Kanak Chapa =

Rumana Islam Kanak Chapa awards and nominations
Awards and nominations
Award	Wins	Nominations

Totals (Note: Certain award groups do not simply award one winner. They acknowledge several different recipients, have runners-up, and have third place. Since this is a specific recognition and is different from losing an award, runner-up mentions are considered wins in this award tally. For simplification and to avoid errors, each award in this list has been presumed to have had a prior nomination.)
- Wins: 13
- Nominations: 13

Rumana Islam Kanak Chapa is a Bangladeshi singer. The following is a list of her accolades:

== Awards ==
Bangladesh National Film Awards

Year	Award	Category	Film	Result
1995	National Film Awards	Best Female Playback Singer	Love Story	Won
2001	National Film Awards	Best Female Playback Singer	Premer Taj Mahal	Won
2008	National Film Awards	Best Female Playback Singer	Ek Takar Bou	Won

Meril Prothom Alo Awards

Year	Award	Category	Result
1999	Meril Prothom Alo Awards	Best Singer (Female)	Won
2000	Meril Prothom Alo Awards	Best Singer (Female)	Won
2001	Meril Prothom Alo Awards	Best Singer (Female)	Won
2002	Meril Prothom Alo Awards	Best Singer (Female)	Won

Bachsas Awards

Year	Award	Category	Result
1999	Bachsas Awards	Best Singer (Female)	Won
2000	Bachsas Awards	Best Singer (Female)	Won
2001	Bachsas Awards	Best Singer (Female)	Won
2008	Bachsas Awards	Best Singer (Female)	Won

Ifad Film Club Award

Year	Award	Category	Result
2012	Ifad Film Club Award	Best Singer (Female)	Won

11th Channel i Music Awards

- Best Modern Song - won
