= Kamrunnahar Azad Swapna =

- কামরুন্নাহার আজাদ স্বপ্না
- Occupation: Film actor
- Years active: 1986–unknown
- Notable work: Mayer Dabi
- Awards: National Film Award (1st time)

Kamrunnahar Azad Swapna is a Bangladeshi film actress. She won the Bangladesh National Film Award for Best Child Artist for the film Mayer Dabi (1986).

== Selected films ==
- Mayer Dabi (1986)

== Awards and nominations ==
National Film Awards

Year	Award	Category	Film	Result
1986	National Film Award	Best Child Artist	Mayer Dabi	Won
