= Baby Bindi =

Bangladeshi film actress

- বেবী বিন্দী
- Born: Aliya Rahman Bindi; Dhaka
- Occupation: Film actress
- Years active: 1982 - present
- Notable work: Lal Kajol
- Awards: National Film Award

Aliya Rahman Bindi, popularly known as Baby Bindi, is a Bangladeshi film actress. Her father is Azizur Rahman (film director). Now she lives in Toronto with her 2 kids and husband. She is a successful Real Estate Agent She won the Bangladesh National Film Award for Best Child Artist for the 1982 film Lal Kajol.

== Filmography ==
- Lal Kajol (1982)

== Awards and nominations ==
National Film Awards

Year	Award	Category	Film	Result
1982	National Film Award	Best Child Artist	Lal Kajal	Won
