= Najma (1983 film) =

Bangladeshi film

- Directed by: Subhash Dutta
- Screenplay by: Subhash Dutta
- Produced by: Abu Zafar Khan
- Starring: Shabana; Abdur Razzak; Anwara Begum; Jashim
- Music by: Alauddin Ali
- Distributed by: S.S. Productions
- Release date: 1983
- Running time: 128 minutes
- Country: Bangladesh
- Language: Bengali

Najma (Bengali: নাজমা) is a 1983 Bangladeshi film starring Abdur Razzak, Shabana, Jashim, Khalil Ullah Khan and Anwara Begum. It was produced by Shabana's production house S.S. Productions. She received her third Bangladesh National Film Award for Best Actress for her performance in the film.

== Cast ==
- Shabana
- Abdur Razzak
- Jashim
- Anwara Begum

== Track listing ==
1. "Shonen Shonen Sudhijon" - Kumar Biswajit, Sabina Yasmin
2. "Fuler Bashor" - Runa Laila, Andrew Kishore
3. "Chokhe Chokhe Rag" - Andrew Kishore Runa Laila
4. "Shobai Bole Tumi Naki" - Pappu Lahiri

== Awards ==
Bangladesh National Film Awards

- Best Actress - Shabana
