= Dodul =

Bangladeshi film actor

- দোদুল
- Born: Master Dodul
- Occupation: Film actor
- Years active: 1990–1997
- Notable work: Lakhe Ekta
- Awards: National Film Award (1st time)

Dodul (known as Master Dodul) is a Bangladeshi film actor. He won Bangladesh National Film Award for Best Child Artist for the film Lakhe Ekta (1990).

== Selected films ==
- Lakhe Ekta - 1990
- Shilpi - 1995
- Hangor Nodi Grenade - 1997

== Awards and nominations ==
National Film Awards

Year	Award	Category	Film	Result
1990	National Film Award	Best Child Artist	Lakhe Ekta	Won
