= Adnan (disambiguation) =

Adnan is, according to tradition, a descendant of Ishmael and an ancestor of the Islamic prophet Muhammad.

Adnan may also refer to:

- Adnan (name), an Arabic name and lists of people with the given name or surname
- Adnan (actor), Bangladeshi film actor
- Adnan AIFV, the Malaysian variant of the ACV 300 Armoured Fighting Vehicle
- "Adnan", a track by Orbital from the album In Sides

== See also ==
- adhan, the Islamic call to prayer
