= Anik (actor) =

Bangladeshi film actor

- অনিক
- Born: N M Anik
- Occupation: Film actor
- Years active: 1993–unknown
- Notable work: Obujh Sontan
- Awards: National Film Award (1st time)

N M Anik (also known as Master Anik) is a Bangladeshi film actor. He won Bangladesh National Film Award for Best Child Artist for the film Obujh Sontan (1993).

== Selected films ==
- Abujh Sontan - 1993

== Awards and nominations ==
National Film Awards

Year	Award	Category	Film	Result
1993	National Film Award	Best Child Artist	Abujh Sontan	Won
