= National Film Awards (Bangladesh) =

Annual awards ceremony

- National Film Awards logo
- Awarded for: Excellence in cinematic achievements for Bangladeshi cinema
- Sponsored by: Government of Bangladesh
- Location: Dhaka
- Country: Bangladesh
- Presented by: Ministry of Information
- First award: 1975
- Final award: 2023
- Website: moi.gov.bd

The National Film Awards (Bengali: জাতীয় চলচ্চিত্র পুরস্কার) is an awards ceremony held annually in Dhaka, Bangladesh. It is considered to be the oldest and most prestigious film award ceremony in Bangladesh. The National Film Awards were established in 1975 by the government of Bangladesh. Every year, a national panel appointed by the government selects the winning entries.

== History ==
The National Film Awards were first presented in 1975. The government of Bangladesh offers the National Film Awards to the films and individuals for notable contributions to the art of cinema. Beginning in 1975, The National Film Awards is an event that takes place annually that includes colorful programs, dance, and music. The awards are the only film awards awarded by the government of Bangladesh.

No awards were given in 1981 because the panel determined that no film was competent enough to receive an award.

== Juries and rules ==
The juries are appointed by the Bangladesh Film Certification Board, a department under the Ministry of Information of the government of Bangladesh. The board members are chosen from a variety of professions; it has previously included social workers, government officers, educators, journalists, filmmakers, film producers, actors, and poets. The board also provides secretarial assistance and manages screenings of films submitted for the National Film Award. It is also responsible for screening of films examined by the Appellate Committee.

== Award categories ==
Every award winner receives a trophy in addition to cash and a certificate. The Lifetime Achievement Award was first introduced in 2009. The amount of cash is increasing than that of the starting time. For Lifetime Achievement it is Tk 300,000, best producer and director Tk 200,000 each, and others Tk 100,000 from November 2019.

=== Lifetime Achievement Award ===
- National Film Award for Lifetime Achievement

=== Merit awards ===
- Best Film
- Best Short Film
- Best Director
- Best Actor
- Best Actress
- Best Supporting Actor
- Best Supporting Actress
- Best Performance in a Negative Role
- Best Performance in a Comic Role
- Best Child Artist
- Best Music Director
- Best Music Composer
- Best Male Playback Singer
- Best Female Playback Singer
- Best Choreography
- Best Lyrics

=== Technical awards ===
- Best Story
- Best Screenplay
- Best Dialogue
- Best Cinematography
- Best Editing
- Best Art Direction
- Best Sound Recording
- Best Costume Design
- Best Make-up
- Best Special Effects

=== Special awards ===
- Special Jury Award
- Best Feature Film

== Awards by decade ==
- National Film Awards (1975–1980): 1975 (1st) • 1976 (2nd) • 1977 (3rd) • 1978 (4th) • 1979 (5th) • 1980 (6th)
- National Film Awards (1982–1990): 1982 (7th) • 1983 (8th) • 1984 (9th) • 1985 (10th) • 1986 (11th) • 1987 (12th) • 1988 (13th) • 1989 (14th) • 1990 (15th)
- National Film Awards (1991–2000): 1991 (16th) • 1992 (17th) • 1993 (18th) • 1994 (19th) • 1995 (20th) • 1996 (21st) • 1997 (22nd) • 1998 (23rd) • 1999 (24th) • 2000 (25th)
- National Film Awards (2001–2010): 2001 (26th) • 2002 (27th) • 2003 (28th) • 2004 (29th) • 2005 (30th) • 2006 (31st) • 2007 (32nd) • 2008 (33rd) • 2009 (34th) • 2010 (35th)
- National Film Awards (2011–2020): 2011 (36th) • 2012 (37th) • 2013 (38th) • 2014 (39th) • 2015 (40th) • 2016 (41st) • 2017 (42nd) • 2018 (43rd) • 2019 (44th) • 2020 (45th)
- National Film Awards (2021–present): 2021 (46th) • 2022 (47th) • 2023 (48th)

== See also ==
- Bachsas Awards
- Meril Prothom Alo Awards
- Babisas Award
