= Mustaba Saud =

Mujtaba Saud is a Bangladeshi film screenwriter and dialogue writer. He is best known for his work in the action and thriller genres of the Bangladesh film industry. In 2009, he won the National Film Award for Best Dialogue for the film Chander Moto Bou.

== Career ==
Saud has built a significant career in Dhallywood, particularly recognized for his sharp and impactful dialogues in action-oriented films. Saud contributed as both a story writer and a dialogue writer in numerous successful commercial films. His most notable achievement came at the 34th National Film Awards, where he received the prestigious state recognition for his writing in Chander Moto Bou.

== Selected filmography & other works ==
Year	Film	Role	Notes
	Lalu Sardar	Story & Dialogue	
	Attorokkha	Story & Dialogue	
2003	Oshombhob	Story & Dialogue	
	Shiba Gunda	Story	
1999	Khobor Ache	Story & Dialogue	
	Ostad er Ostad	Story & Dialogue	
	Bhalobashar Shotru	Story	
	Gangster	Dialogue	
	Keamat	Story & Dialogue	
	Masud Rana Ekhon Dhakay	Story & Dialogue	
	Joto Prem Toto Jwala	Dialogue	
	Dhakar Rani	Story & Dialogue	
	Tough Operation	Story & Dialogue	
	Bharate Khuni	Dialogue	
	Mission Shantipur	Story & Dialogue	
	Revenge	Story & Dialogue	
	High Risk	Story & Dialogue	
	Tension	Story & Dialogue	
2009	Ekjon Shonge Chilo	Dialogue	
	Bhal Hote Chai	Story & Dialogue	
2009	Chander Moto Bou	Story & Dialogue	Won National Film Award
	Rana Plaza	Dialogue	
	Maidan	Story & Dialogue	
	Maer Swapno	Story & Dialogue	
	Choto Bon	Story & Dialogue	
2014	Lovee Pap Pape Mrittu	Story & Dialogue	
2011	Matir Thikana	Story & Dialogue	

== Awards and nominations ==
Year	Award	Category	Film	Result
2009	National Film Award	Best Dialogue	Chander Moto Bou	Won
