= Mohiuddin Ahmad =

Bangladeshi film director, writer and producer

- মহিউদ্দীন আহমেদ
- Born: Mohammad Mohiuddin
- Occupations: Film director, Writer, Producer
- Years active: 1959–1991
- Notable work: Boro Bhalo Lok Chhilo; Padma Meghna Jamuna
- Awards: National Film Awards (2nd times)

Mohiuddin Ahmad (popularly known as Mohammad Mohiuddin) is a Bangladeshi film director, writer and producer. In 1982, he won the Bangladesh National Film Award for Best Director for the film Boro Bhalo Lok Chhilo and in 1991 he won Bangladesh National Film Award for Best Story for the film Padma Meghna Jamuna.

== Selected films ==
- Matir Pahar - 1959
- Tomar Amar - 1961
- Raja Elo Shohore - 1964
- Shit Bikle - 1964
- Godhulir Prem - 1965
- Isa Khan - 1974
- Surja Dighal Bari - 1979
- Protiggya - 1980
- Boro Bhalo Lok Chhilo - 1982
- Padma Meghna Jamuna - 1991

== Awards and nominations ==
National Film Awards

Year	Award	Category	Film	Result
1982	National Film Award	Best Director	Boro Bhalo Lok Chhilo	Won
1991	National Film Award	Best Story	Padma Meghna Jamuna	Won
