= Dui Poisar Alta =

Bangladeshi film

Dui Poishar Alta
- Poster
- Directed by: Amjad Hossain
- Screenplay by: Amjad Hossain
- Produced by: Iftekharul Alam Kislu
- Starring: Shabana; Razzak; Anwara; Nuton
- Cinematography: Rafiqul Bari Chowdhury
- Music by: Alauddin Ali
- Distributed by: Star Corporation
- Release date: 1982
- Running time: 128 minutes
- Country: Bangladesh
- Language: Bengali

Dui Poishar Alta (Bengali: দুই পয়সার আলতা; English: Cheap Alta) is a 1982 Bangladeshi film starring Razzak and Shabana opposite him. She garnered Bangladesh National Film Award for Best Actress for her performance in the film. It also stars Nuton and Anwara.

== Cast ==
- Shabana
- Razzak
- Nuton
- Anwara
- Prabir Mitra

== Track listing ==
1. "Ei Duniya Ekhon To Aar" - Mitali Mukherjee
2. "Ami Hobo Por" - Runa Laila
3. "Eto Beshi Bolis Na" - Runa Laila
4. "Kiba Jadu Jano" - Aladdin Ali
5. "Emonoto Prem Hoy" - Syed Abdul Hadi

== Awards ==
Bangladesh National Film Awards

- Best Actress - Shabana
- Best Female Playback Singer - Mitali Mukherjee
- Best Editing - Awkat Hossain
- Best Cinematographer - Rafiqul Bari Chowdhury
