= Zara Zarib =

Bangladeshi actor

- Born: 26 January 2003 (age 22); Khulna
- Occupation: Actor
- Years active: 2011–present
- Awards: Bangladesh National Film Award

Zara Zarib is a Bangladeshi actor. He became known as a child actor for his role as Prarthona in the full-length Bangla film Parthona (2015), directed by Shahriar Nazim Joy. He has received several awards, including the National Film Award as Best Child Actor.

== Films ==
Year	Film	Director	Note
2015	Prarthona	Shahriar Nazim Joy	First Movie Appearance
