= Chander Moto Bou =

Bangladeshi film

- Poster
- Directed by: Mohammed Hossain
- Based on: Choritrohin novel of Sharatchandra Chattopadhyay
- Starring: Riaz; Shabnur; Nipun; Dolly Zahur; ATM Shamsuzzaman
- Music by: Alam Khan; Ahmed Imtiaz Bulbul; Ali Akram Shuvo
- Release date: 2009
- Country: Bangladesh
- Language: Bengali

Chander Moto Bou (Bengali: চাঁদের মত বউ;English: A Wife Similar To Moon) is a 2009 Bangladeshi film starring Shabnur, Riaz and Nipun. It garnered Bangladesh National Film Awards in 2 categories: Best Dialogue for Mujtaba Saud and Best Supporting Actress for Nipun.

== Awards ==
Bangladesh National Film Awards

- Best Supporting Actress - Nipun
- Best Dialogue - Mujtaba Saud
