= 1st Bangladesh National Film Awards =

National Film Awards, Bangladesh

- Awarded for: Best of bangladeshi cinema in 1975
- Awarded by: President of Bangladesh
- Presented by: Ministry of Information
- Presented on: 4 April 1976
- Site: Dhaka, Bangladesh
- Official website: moi.gov.bd

Highlights
- Best Feature Film: Lathial
- Best Actor: Anwar Hossain; Lathial
- Best Actress: Bobita; Bandi Theke Begum
- Most awards: Lathial (6)

The 1st Bangladesh National Film Awards (Bengali: জাতীয় চলচ্চিত্র পুরস্কার) presented by Ministry of Information to felicitate the best of Bangladeshi Cinema censored in the year 1975. Every year, a national panel appointed by the government selects the winning entry and awards were given by then President of Bangladesh. It was the first ceremony of National Film Awards and presented on 4 April 1976. Director Zahir Raihan was awarded a special awards.

== List of winners ==
This year awards were given in total 12 categories out of 19 categories.

=== Merit awards ===
Name of Awards	Winner(s)	Film
Best Film	Narayan Ghosh Mita (Producer)	Lathial
Best Director	Narayan Ghosh Mita	Lathial
Best Actor	Anwar Hossain	Lathial
Best Actress	Bobita	Bandi Theke Begum
Best Actor in a Supporting Role	Farooque	Lathial
Best Actress in a Supporting Role	Rosy Samad	Lathial
Best Music Director	Debu Bhattacherjee and Lokman Hossain Fakir	Charitraheen
Best Male Playback Singer	Abdul Alim	Sujon Sokhi (Sob Sokhire Par Korite)
Best Female Playback Singer	Sabina Yasmin	Sadharon Meye

=== Technical awards ===
Name of Awards	Winner(s)	Film
Best Screenplay	Khan Ataur Rahman	Sujon Sokhi
Best Cinematography (Black & White)	Baby Islam	Charitraheen
Best Editing	Boshir Hossain	Lathial

Best Actresd: Bobota

Film Name: "Badi Theke Begom"

=== Special Award ===
- Zahir Raihan (Posthumous)

== Multiple awards ==
The following films received multiple awards:

Film	Awards	Categories
Lathial	6	Best film, best director, best actor, best actor in a supporting role, best actress in a supporting role, and Best Editing
Sujon Sokhi	2	Best Screenplay and Best Male Playback Singer
Charitraheen	2	Best Music Director, and Best Cinematography (Black & White)

== See also ==
- Bachsas Awards
- Meril Prothom Alo Awards
- Ifad Film Club Award
- Babisas Award
