= 7th Bangladesh National Film Awards =

National Film Awards, Bangladesh

- Awarded for: Best of Bangladeshi cinema in 1982
- Awarded by: President of Bangladesh
- Presented by: Ministry of Information
- Presented on: 1982
- Site: Dhaka, Bangladesh
- Official website: moi.gov.bd

Highlights
- Best Feature Film: Not Awarded
- Best Actor: Nayok Raj Razzak; Boro Bhalo Lok Chhilo
- Best Actress: Shabana; Dui Poisar Alta
- Most awards: Boro Bhalo Lok Chhilo (6)

The 7th Bangladesh National Film Awards (Bengali: জাতীয় চলচ্চিত্র পুরস্কার), presented by Ministry of Information, Bangladesh to felicitate the best of Bangladeshi Cinema released in the year 1982. Bangladesh National Film Awards is a film award ceremony in Bangladesh established in 1975 by Government of Bangladesh. Every year, a national panel appointed by the government selects the winning entry, and the award ceremony is held in Dhaka. 1982 was the 7th ceremony of National Film Awards.

== List of winners ==
This year awards were given in 15 categories and awards for Best Film and Best Art Director were not given.

=== Merit awards ===
Name of Awards	Winner(s)	Film
Best Director	Mohiuddin Ahmad	Boro Bhalo Lok Chhilo
Best Actor	Abdur Razzak	Boro Bhalo Lok Chhilo
Best Actress	Shabana	Dui Poisar Alta
Best Actor in a Supporting Role	Prabir Mitra	Boro Bhalo Lok Chhilo
Best Actress in a Supporting Role	Ayesha Akter	Rajanigandha
Best Child Artist	Baby Bindi	Lal Kajol and Lathyrism
Best Music Director	Alam Khan	Boro Bhalo Lok Chhilo
Best Lyrics	Masud Karim	Dui Poisar Alta
Best Male Playback Singer	Andrew Kishore	Boro Bhalo Lok Chhilo
Best Female Playback Singer	Mitali Mukherjee	Dui Poisar Alta

=== Technical awards ===
Name of Awards	Winner(s)	Film
Best Screenplay	Alamgir Kabir	Mohana
Best Cinematographer (Black and White)	Rafiqul Bari Chowdhury	Dui Poisar Alta
Best Cinematographer (Color)	Shafiqul Islam Swapan	Nalish
Best Editing	Awkat Hossain	Dui Poisar Alta
Best Dialogue	Syed Shamsul Haque	Boro Bhalo Lok Chhilo

== Summary ==
Boro Bhalo Lok Chhilo won 6 awards: Best Director, Best Actor, Best Actor in a Supporting Role, Best Music Director, Best Male Playback Singer and Best Dialogue. Shabana received the best actress award.

== See also ==
- Meril Prothom Alo Awards
- Ifad Film Club Award
- Babisas Award
