= Megher Onek Rong =

Bangladeshi film

- Poster
- Bengali: মেঘের অনেক রং
- Directed by: Harunur Rashid
- Produced by: Anwar Ashraf
- Starring: Mathin; Omor Elahi; Rawshan Ara; Adnan
- Cinematography: Harunur Rashid
- Distributed by: Ratna Kothachitra
- Release date: 12 November 1976 (Bangladesh)
- Running time: 109 minutes
- Country: Bangladesh
- Language: Bengali

Megher Onek Rong (Bengali: মেঘের অনেক রং) is a Bangladeshi Bengali film directed by Harunur Rashid based on Bangladesh Liberation war. This film got National Film Awards in five categories including Best Film, Best Director, Best Child Artist, Best Music Director, and Best Cinematography.

== Plot ==
This film portray rape scenes and suicide of victims during the liberation. It also shows the adopting of war children to their foster mothers after the death of their biological mothers.

== Cast ==
- Mathin
- Omor Elahi
- Rawshan Ara
- Adnan

== Soundtrack ==
The music and background score was directed by Ferdausi Rahman.

== Response ==
Film critic Ahmed Muztaba Zamal, writing in Cinemaya in 2000, named Megher Onek Rong as one of the top twelve films from Bangladesh.

== Awards ==
Award Title	Category	Awardee	Result
National Film Awards	Best Film	Anwar Ashraf (producer)	Won
National Film Awards	Best Director	Harunur Rashid	Won
National Film Awards	Best Child Artist	Master Adnan	Won
National Film Awards	Best Music Director	Ferdausi Rahman	Won
National Film Awards	Best Cinematography	Harunur Rashid	Won
