= Lal Kajol =

Bangladeshi film

- Poster
- Directed by: Matin Rahman
- Screenplay by: Matin Rahman
- Produced by: Ramala Saha; Azizur Rahman
- Starring: Shabana; Farooque; Ujjal; Prabir Mitra
- Music by: Satya Saha
- Release date: 1982
- Running time: 141 minutes
- Country: Bangladesh
- Languages: Bengali, English

Lal Kajol is a 1982 Bangladeshi film starring Shabana and Farooque opposite him. Child actor Bindi Rahman garnered Bangladesh National Film Awards for Best Child Artist and producer Azizur Rahman garnered Best Film Award at Bachsas Awards.

== Awards ==
Bangladesh National Film Awards

- Best Child Artist - Bindi Rahman

Bachsas Awards

- Best Film - Azizur Rahman
