= Abul Khair (actor) =

Bangladeshi TV and film actor

- আবুল খায়ের
- Born: 4 April 1929
- Died: 2 February 2001 (aged 71)
- Occupation: Actor
- Awards: Bangladesh National Film Awards

Abul Khair was a Bangladeshi television and film actor. He won the Bangladesh National Film Award for Best Supporting Actor four times for his roles in the films Dahan (1985), Rajlakshmi Srikanta (1987), Anya Jibon (1995), and Dukhai (1997).

== Career ==
Khair's acting career started in the mid-1950s. Later in life, when he again started performing on television, he acted in many of Humayun Ahmed's television dramas and the film drama serial Ei Shob Din Ratri. He later acted in Bohubrihi, Aaj Robibar, Ayomoy Nokkhotrer Rat, and others.

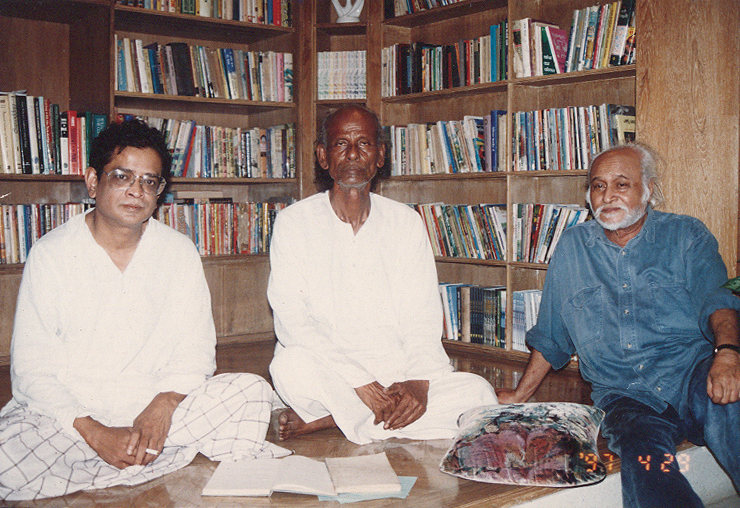
Humayun Ahmed, Shah Abdul Karim, and Abul Khayer in 1996

Besides being an actor on television and movies, he also held several executive positions domestically and internationally as follows:

- Director of Films, Ministry of Information of the then government of East Pakistan and later on government of Bangladesh during 1968 to 1976.
- During that time he got permission from the Pakistan government to go to India to direct a documentary on now National Poet Kazi Nazrul Islam (The Rebel Poet) in 1970.
- He orchestrated and directed the 7 March Speech of Sheikh Mujibur Rahman (the only copy was restored and saved by him during the war).
- He also made a documentary on Bangladesh ,"This is Bangladesh", which was shown at the Montreal World Film Festival (1977)
- Managing Director of FDC (Film Development Corporation) from 1973 to 1975
- International Film Director, United Nations, New York City, United States from 1976 to 1980. In this capacity, he made many documentary movies on human habitat in Sri Lanka, Canada, Bangladesh, India, and Pakistan. He directed the documentary "The Big Village" for the UN, which is in the Bangladesh Film Archive as well as the UN film archive.

== Works ==
=== Television ===
- Ei Shob Din Ratri
- Kothao Keu Nei
- Bohubrihi
- Aaj Robibar (1999)
- Ayomoy
- Nimful (1997)
- Shobinoy Nibedon (1965)
- Nokkhotrer Rat '(1997)

=== Film ===
- Mukh O Mukhosh (1956)
- Kancher Deyal (1963)
- Sangam (1964)
- Titash Ekti Nadir Naam (1973)
- Akhoni Shomoy (1981)
- Dahan (1985)
- Pension (1984)
- Rajlakshmi Srikanta (1987)
- Jinner Badshah (1989)
- Padma Nadir Majhi (1992)
- Patang (film) (1993)
- Ekattorer Jishu (1993)
- Abujh Sontan (1993)
- Chaka (1993)
- Anya Jibon (1995)
- Nodir Naam Modhumoti (1996)
- Dipu Number Two (1996)
- Dukhai (1997)
- Srabon Megher Din (1999)
- Somudro Bilash Private Limited (1999)
