= Haldaa =

2017 Bangladeshi film

- Bengali: হালদা
- Directed by: Tauquir Ahmed
- Written by: Azad Bulbul
- Screenplay by: Tauquir Ahmed
- Produced by: H.M. Ibrahim
- Starring: Mosharraf Karim; Zahid Hasan; Nusrat Imrose Tisha; Dilara Zaman; Fazlur Rahman Babu
- Cinematography: Enamul Haq Sohel
- Edited by: Amit Debnath
- Music by: Pintu Ghosh
- Production company: Nokkhotro Cholochitra
- Distributed by: The Abhi Kathachitra
- Release date: 8 December 2017 (Bangladesh)
- Country: Bangladesh
- Language: Bengali

Haldaa is a 2017 Bangladeshi film directed by Tauquir Ahmed, based on the story written by Azad Bulbul. The film's plot is based on the struggling life of the fishermen of Halda River located in Chittagong, the only natural fish breeding center in Asia. The film is narrated in local Chittagonian dialect, although the dialogues are simplified for the understanding of the general audience.

== Cast ==
- Mosharraf Karim as Bodi
- Zahid Hasan as Nader Chowdhury
- Nusrat Imrose Tisha as Hashu
- Fazlur Rahman Babu as Monu Miya
- Dilara Zaman
- Shahed Ali
- Runa Khan

== Music ==
The music for the film was composed by Pintu Ghosh. The lyrics were written by Ramesh Shil, Tauquir Ahmed and Pintu Ghosh.

== Release ==
The movie was released on 1 December 2017 in 81 theaters in Bangladesh. The theatrical release poster was by Bipasha Hayat.

== Awards ==
8th SAARC Film Festival 2018

- Best Feature Film Award
- Best Original Score
- Best Editor
- Best Cinematographer
