= 2nd Bangladesh National Film Awards =

National Film Awards, Bangladesh

- Awarded for: Best of bangladeshi cinema in 1976
- Awarded by: President of Bangladesh
- Presented by: Ministry of Information
- Presented on: 24 March 1977
- Site: Dhaka, Bangladesh
- Official website: moi.gov.bd

Highlights
- Best Feature Film: Megher Onek Rong
- Best Actor: Nayok Raj Razzak; Ki Je Kori
- Best Actress: Bobita; Nayanmani
- Most awards: Megher Onek Rong (5)

The 2nd Bangladesh National Film Awards (Bengali: জাতীয় চলচ্চিত্র পুরস্কার) was presented by Ministry of Information to felicitate the best of Bangladeshi Cinema censored in the year 1976. It was the second ceremony of National Film Awards. The Ceremony took place at Dhaka, Bangladesh on March 24, 1977, and awards were given by then President of Bangladesh. 20 films were submitted for different categories.

== List of winners ==
This year, the best film artistes were awarded in 15 categories out of 19 categories.

=== Merit Awards ===
| Name of Awards | Winner(s) | Film |
|---|---|---|
| Best Film | Harunur Rashid | Megher Onek Rong |
| Best Director | Harunur Rashid | Megher Onek Rong |
| Best Actor | Abdur Razzak | Ki Je Kori |
| Best Actress | Bobita | Nayanmoni |
| Best Actor in a Supporting Role | Khalil Ullah Khan | Gunda |
| Best Actress in a Supporting Role | Rawshan Jamil | Nayanmoni |
| Best Child Artist | Master Adnan | Megher Onek Rong |
| Best Music Director | Ferdausi Rahman | Megher Onek Rong |
| Best Male Playback Singer | Mahmudun Nabi | The Rain |
| Best Female Playback Singer | Runa Laila | The Rain |

=== Technical Awards ===
| Name of Awards | Winner(s) | Film |
|---|---|---|
| Best Screenplay | Amjad Hossain | Nayanmoni |
| Best Cinematography | Harunur Rashid | Megher Onek Rong |
| Best Art Director | Abdus Sabur | Surjogrohon |
| Best Editing | Bashir Hossain | Matir Maya |

== See also ==
- Meril Prothom Alo Awards
- Ifad Film Club Award
- Babisas Award
