= 12th Bangladesh National Film Awards =

National Film Awards, Bangladesh

- Awarded for: Best of bangladeshi cinema in 1987
- Awarded by: President of Bangladesh
- Presented by: Ministry of Information
- Presented on: 1987
- Site: Dhaka, Bangladesh
- Official website: www.moi.gov.bd

Highlights
- Best Feature Film: Rajlakshmi Shrikant
- Best Actor: Alamgir and ATM Shamsuzzaman (tie); Apeksha and Dayi Ke
- Best Actress: Shabana; Apeksha
- Most awards: Rajlakshmi Shrikant, Apeksha, and Dayi Ke (3)

The 12th Bangladesh National Film Awards was presented by the Ministry of Information, Bangladesh to felicitate the best of Bangladeshi cinema released in the year 1987. The ceremony took place in Dhaka and awards were given by the then president of Bangladesh. The National Film Awards are the only film awards given by the government itself. Every year, a national panel appointed by the government selects the winning entry, and the award ceremony is held in Dhaka. 1987 was the 12th National Film Awards.

== List of winners ==
This year awards were given in 17 categories. Awards for Best Lyricist was not given in 1987.

=== Merit awards ===
Name of Awards	Winner(s)	Film
Best Film		Rajlakshmi Srikanta
Best Director	A. J. Mintu	Lalu Mastan
Best Actor	Alamgir; ATM Shamsuzzaman	Apeksha; Dayi Ke
Best Actress	Shabana	Apeksha
Best Actor in a Supporting Role	Anwar Hossain; Abul Khair	Dayi Ke; Rajlakshmi Srikanta
Best Actress in a Supporting Role	Parveen Sultana Diti	Swami Stree
Best Child Artist	Master Russel and Suborno Shirin	Rajlakshmi Srikanta
Best Music Director	Alam Khan	Surrender
Best Male Playback Singer	Andrew Kishore	Surrender (Sobai To Bhalobasa Chai)
Best Female Playback Singer	Sabina Yasmin	Rajlakshmi Srikanta (Shoto Jonomer Shopno)

=== Technical awards ===
Name of Awards	Winner(s)	Film
Best Story	Kazi Hayat	Dayi Ke
Best Screenplay	Dilip Biswas	Apeksha
Best Cinematography (Black and White)	Mahfuzur Rahman Khan	Sohojatri
Best Cinematography (Color)	Abul Khayer	Setubandhan
Best Art Director	Sharifuddin Bhuiyan	Harano Sur
Best Editing	Bashir Hossain	Matir Maya
Best Sound Editing	Mahfuzul Haque	Sandhi

== See also ==
- Meril Prothom Alo Awards
- Ifad Film Club Award
- Babisas Award
