= 22nd Bangladesh National Film Awards =

Ceremony for films released in 1997

- Awarded for: Best of bangladeshi cinema in 1997
- Awarded by: President of Bangladesh
- Presented by: Ministry of Information
- Presented on: 1998
- Site: Dhaka, Bangladesh
- Official website: moi.gov.bd

Highlights
- Best Feature Film: Dukhai
- Best Non-feature Film: Jibon O Ovinoy
- Best Actor: Raisul Islam Asad; Dukhai
- Best Actress: Suchorita; Hangor Nodi Grenade
- Most awards: Dukhai (9)

The 22nd Bangladesh National Film Awards were presented by the Ministry of Information, Bangladesh, to felicitate the best of Bangladeshi cinema released in the year 1997. The ceremony took place in Dhaka, and awards were given by the president of Bangladesh. The National Film Awards are the only film awards given by the government itself. Every year, a national panel appointed by the government selects the winning entry, and the award ceremony is held in Dhaka. 1997 was the 22nd ceremony of the National Film Awards.

== List of winners ==
This year artists received awards in 15 categories. No awards were given in the Best Lyrics, Best Female Playback Singer, Best Cinematography, Best Dialogue, or Best Editing categories in 1997.

=== Merit awards ===
Name of Awards	Winner(s)	Film
Best Film	Morshedul Islam (Producer)	Dukhai
Best Director	Chashi Nazrul Islam	Hangor Nodi Grenade
Best Actor	Raisul Islam Asad	Dukhai
Best Actress	Suchorita	Hangor Nodi Grenade
Best Actor in a Supporting Role	Abul Khair	Dukhai
Best Actress in a Supporting Role	Rokeya Prachy	Dukhai
Best Child Artist	Nishi	Dukhai
Best Music Director	Khan Ataur Rahman	Ekhono Anek Raat
Best Music Composer	Khan Ataur Rahman	Ekhono Anek Raat
Best Male Playback Singer	Kiran Chandra Roy	Dukhai

=== Technical awards ===
Name of Awards	Winner(s)	Film
Best Screenplay	MA Mobin	Dukhai
Best Story	Selina Hossain	Hangor Nodi Grenade
Best Art Direction	Mohiuddin Faruque	Dukhai
Best Makeup	Moyajjem Hossain	Dukhai

=== Special awards ===
- Best Feature Film - Jibon O Ovinoy

== See also ==
- Bachsas Film Awards
- Meril Prothom Alo Awards
- Ifad Film Club Award
- Babisas Award
