= 20th Bangladesh National Film Awards =

National Film Awards, Bangladesh

- Awarded for: Best of bangladeshi cinema in 1995
- Awarded by: President of Bangladesh
- Presented by: Ministry of Information
- Presented on: 1996
- Site: Dhaka, Bangladesh
- Official website: moi.gov.bd

Highlights
- Best Feature Film: Anya Jibon
- Best Non-feature Film: Muktir Gaan
- Best Actor: Raisul Islam Asad; Anya Jibon
- Best Actress: Champa; Anya Jibon
- Most awards: Anya Jibon (8)

The 20th Bangladesh National Film Awards were presented by the Ministry of Information, Bangladesh, to felicitate the best of Bangladeshi cinema released in the year 1995. The ceremony took place in Dhaka, and awards were given by the president of Bangladesh. The National Film Awards are the only film awards given by the government itself. Every year, a national panel appointed by the government selects the winning entry, and the award ceremony is held in Dhaka. 1995 was the 20th ceremony of the National Film Awards.

== List of winners ==
This year artists received awards in 16 categories. No awards were given in the Best Music Director or Best Lyrics categories in 1995.

=== Merit awards ===
Name of Awards	Winner(s)	Film
Best Film	(Producer)	Anya Jibon
Best Short Film	Tareque Masud ‍ Catherine Masud	Muktir Gaan
Best Director	Sheikh Niamat Ali	Anya Jibon
Best Actor	Raisul Islam Asad	Anya Jibon
Best Actress	Champa	Anya Jibon
Best Actor in a Supporting Role	Abul Khair	Anya Jibon
Best Actress in a Supporting Role	Shanta Islam	Anya Jibon
Best Child Artist	Master Tonmoy	Anya Jibon
Best Male Playback Singer	Saidur Rahman Boyati	Nodir Naam Modhumoti
Best Female Playback Singer	Kanak Chapa	Love Story

=== Technical awards ===
Name of Awards	Winner(s)	Film
Best Art Direction	Uttam Guho	Anya Jibon
Best Screenplay	Anwar Hossain	Anya Jibon
Best Story	Tanvir Mokammel	Nodir Naam Modhumoti
Best Cinematography	Sheikh Niamat Ali	Anya Jibon
Best Dialogue	Tanvir Mokammel	Nodir Naam Modhumoti
Best Editing	Atiqur Rahman Mallik	Anya Jibon

== See also ==
- Meril Prothom Alo Awards
- Ifad Film Club Award
- Babisas Award
