= 10th Bangladesh National Film Awards =

National Film Awards, Bangladesh

- Awarded for: Best of bangladeshi cinema in 1985
- Awarded by: President of Bangladesh
- Presented by: Ministry of Information
- Presented on: 1985
- Site: Dhaka, Bangladesh
- Official website: www.moi.gov.bd

Highlights
- Best Feature Film: Not awarded
- Best Actor: Alamgir; Ma O Chhele
- Best Actress: Bobita; Ramer Sumati
- Most awards: Dahan and Ma O Chhele (3)

The 10th Bangladesh National Film Awards (Bengali: জাতীয় চলচ্চিত্র পুরস্কার) were presented by the Ministry of Information, Bangladesh, to felicitate the best of Bangladeshi cinema released in the year 1985. The Bangladesh National Film Awards is a film award ceremony in Bangladesh established in 1975 by the government of Bangladesh. Every year, a national panel appointed by the government selects the winning entry, and the award ceremony is held in Dhaka. 1985 was the 10th ceremony of the Bangladesh National Film Award.

== List of winners ==
A total of 14 artists were awarded in this ceremony. Best Film and Best Male Playback Singer awards were not given in 1985.

=== Merit awards ===
| Name of Awards | Winner(s) | Film |
|---|---|---|
| Best Director | Sheikh Niamat Ali | Dahan |
| Best Actor | Alamgir | Ma O Chhele |
| Best Actress | Bobita | Ramer Sumati |
| Best Actor in a Supporting Role | Abul Khair | Dahan |
| Best Actress in a Supporting Role | Rehana | Ma O Chhele |
| Best Child Artist | Master Joy | Ramer Sumati |
| Best Music Director | Alam Khan | Teen Kanya |
| Best Lyrics | Alauddin Ali | Premik |
| Best Female Playback Singer | Sabina Yasmin | Premik |

=== Technical awards ===
| Name of Awards | Winner(s) | Film |
|---|---|---|
| Best Story | Sheikh Niamat Ali | Dahan |
| Best Screenplay | Ismail Mohanmad | Ma O Chhele |
| Best Cinematographer (Color) | Baby Islam | Premik |
| Best Art Director | Abdus Sabur | Surjogrohon |
| Best Editing | Mujibur Rahman Dulu | Teen Kanya |

== See also ==
- Meril Prothom Alo Awards
- Ifad Film Club Award
- Babisas Award
