= 17th Bangladesh National Film Awards =

National Film Awards, Bangladesh

- Awarded for: Best of bangladeshi cinema in 1992
- Awarded by: President of Bangladesh
- Presented by: Ministry of Information
- Presented on: 1992
- Site: Dhaka, Bangladesh
- Official website: moi.gov.bd

Highlights
- Best Feature Film: Shonkhonil Karagar
- Best Non-feature Film: Dhusor Jatra
- Best Actor: Alamgir; Andh Biswas
- Best Actress: Dolly Johur; Shonkhonil Karagar
- Most awards: Shonkhonil Karagar and Traas (4)

The 17th Bangladesh National Film Awards were presented by the Ministry of Information, Bangladesh, to felicitate the best of Bangladeshi cinema released in the year 1992. The ceremony took place in Dhaka, and awards were given by the president of Bangladesh. The National Film Awards are the only film awards given by the government itself. Every year, a national panel appointed by the government selects the winning entry, and the award ceremony is held in Dhaka. 1992 was the 17th ceremony of the National Film Awards.

== List of winners ==
This year awards were given in 23 categories.

=== Merit awards ===
Name of Awards	Winner(s)	Film
Best Film		Shonkhonil Karagar
Best Short Film		Dhusor Jatra
Best Director	Motin Rahman	Andh Biswas
Best Actress	Dolly Johur	Shonkhonil Karagar
Best Actor	Alamgir	Andh Biswas
Best Actor in a Supporting Role	Mizu Ahmed	Traash
Best Actress in a Supporting Role	Anwara Begum	Radha Krishna
Best Child Artist	Baby Taniya	Uchit Shikkha
Best Music Director	Alam Khan	Dinkal
Best Lyrics	Gazi Mazharul Anwar	Tit for Tat
Best Male Playback Singer	Syed Abdul Hadi	Khoma
Best Female Playback Singer	Sabina Yasmin	Radha Krishna

=== Technical awards ===
Name of Awards	Winner(s)	Film
Best Screenplay	Kazi Hayat	Traash
Best Story	Humayun Ahmed	Shonkhonil Karagar
Best Cinematography (Color)	Anwarul Islam Baby	Dinkal
Best Art Direction	Bijoy Sen	Andh Biswas
Best Dialogue	Kazi Hayat	Traash
Best Editing	Saiful Islam	Traash
Best Sound Editing	MA Majid	Shonkhonil Karagar
Best Choreography	Amir Hossain Babu	The Desperate
Best Makeup	Deepak Kumar Sur	Matir Kosom

=== Special awards ===
- Special Award - Abdul Jabbar Khan (posthumous)

== See also ==
- Meril Prothom Alo Awards
- Ifad Film Club Award
- Babisas Award
