= 21st Bangladesh National Film Awards =

National Film Awards, Bangladesh

- Awarded for: Best of bangladeshi cinema in 1996
- Awarded by: President of Bangladesh
- Presented by: Ministry of Information
- Presented on: 1997
- Site: Dhaka, Bangladesh
- Official website: moi.gov.bd

Highlights
- Best Feature Film: Poka Makorer Ghor Bosoti
- Best Actor: Sohel Rana; Ajante
- Best Actress: Shabnaz; Nirmom
- Most awards: Ajante (5)

The 21st Bangladesh National Film Awards were presented by the Ministry of Information, Bangladesh, to felicitate the best of Bangladeshi cinema released in the year 1996. The ceremony took place in Dhaka, and awards were given by the President of Bangladesh. The National Film Awards are the only film awards given by the government itself. Every year, a national panel appointed by the government selects the winning entry, and the award ceremony is held in Dhaka. 1996 was the 21st ceremony of the National Film Awards.

== List of winners ==
This year artists received awards in 13 categories. No awards were given in the Best Actress in a Supporting Role, Best Female Playback Singer, Best Art Direction, or Best Cinematography categories in 1996.

=== Merit awards ===
Name of Awards	Winner(s)	Film
Best Film	Bobita (Producer)	Poka Makorer Ghor Bosoti
Best Director	Akhtaruzzaman	Poka Makorer Ghor Bosoti
Best Actor	Sohel Rana	Ajante
Best Actress	Shabnaz	Nirmom
Best Actor in a Supporting Role	Bulbul Ahmed	Dipu Number Two
Best Child Artist	Arun Saha	Dipu Number Two
Best Music Director	Satya Saha	Ajante
Best Lyrics	Gazi Mazharul Anwar	Ajante
Best Male Playback Singer	Andrew Kishore	Kobul

=== Technical awards ===
Name of Awards	Winner(s)	Film
Best Story	Selina Hossain	Poka Makorer Ghor Bosoti
Best Cinematography	Mahfuzur Rahman Khan	Poka Makorer Ghor Bosoti
Best Dialogue	Dilip Biswas	Ajante
Best Editing	Aminul Islam Mintu	Ajante

== See also ==
- Meril Prothom Alo Awards
- Ifad Film Club Award
- Babisas Award
