= 18th Bangladesh National Film Awards =

National Film Awards, Bangladesh

- Awarded for: Best of bangladeshi cinema in 1993
- Awarded by: President of Bangladesh
- Presented by: Ministry of Information
- Presented on: 1993
- Site: Dhaka, Bangladesh
- Official website: moi.gov.bd

Highlights
- Best Feature Film: Padma Nadir Majhi
- Best Actor: Raisul Islam Asad; Padma Nadir Majhi
- Best Actress: Champa; Padma Nadir Majhi
- Most awards: Padma Nadir Majhi (5)

The 18th Bangladesh National Film Awards were presented by the Ministry of Information, Bangladesh, to felicitate the best of Bangladeshi cinema released in the year 1993. The ceremony took place in Dhaka, and awards were given by the president of Bangladesh. The National Film Awards are the only film awards given by the government itself. Every year, a national panel appointed by the government selects the winning entry, and the award ceremony is held in Dhaka. 1993 was the 18th ceremony of the National Film Awards.

== List of winners ==
This year artists received awards in 19 categories. Awards for Best Short Film and Best Actor in a Supporting Role were not given.

=== Merit awards ===
Name of Awards	Winner(s)	Film
Best Film	Habibur Rahman Khan (Producer)	Padma Nadir Majhi
Best Director	A. J. Mintu	Banglar Bodhu
Best Actor	Raisul Islam Asad	Padma Nadir Majhi
Best Actress	Champa	Padma Nadir Majhi
Best Actress in a Supporting Role	Anwara Begum	Banglar Bodhu
Best Child Artist	Anik	Abujh Sontan
Best Music Director	Azad Rahman	Chandabaz
Best Lyrics	Hasan Fakri	Chandabaz; Banglar Bodhu
Best Male Playback Singer	Azad Rahman	Chandabaz
Best Female Playback Singer	Farida Parveen	Andho Prem

=== Technical awards ===
Name of Awards	Winner(s)	Film
Best Screenplay	A J Mintu	Banglar Bodhu
Best Story	Kazi Hayat	Chandabaz
Best Cinematography	A R Zahangir	Abujh Santan
Best Dialogue	Selim Al Din	Ekattorer Jishu
Best Art Direction	Mohihuddin Faruk	Padma Nadir Majhi
Best Editing	Mujibur Rahman Dulu	Banglar Bodhu
Best Sound Editing	Taj Uddin Bhuiyan	Moushumi
Best Choreography	Masum Babul	Dola
Best Makeup	Mohammed Alauddin	Padma Nadir Majhi

=== Special awards ===
- Special Award - Nazir Ahmed (posthumous)

== See also ==
- Meril Prothom Alo Awards
- Ifad Film Club Award
- Babisas Award
