= 14th Bangladesh National Film Awards =

National Film Awards, Bangladesh

- Awarded for: Best of bangladeshi cinema in 1989
- Awarded by: President of Bangladesh
- Presented by: Ministry of Information
- Presented on: 1989
- Site: Dhaka, Bangladesh
- Official website: www.moi.gov.bd

Highlights
- Best Feature Film: Not Awarded
- Best Actor: Alamgir; Khotipuron
- Best Actress: Shabana; Ranga Bhabi
- Most awards: Satya Mithya (5)

The 14th Bangladesh National Film Awards were presented by the Ministry of Information, Bangladesh to felicitate the best of Bangladeshi cinema released in the year 1989. The ceremony took place in Dhaka and awards were given by then president of Bangladesh. The National Film Awards are the only film awards given by the government itself. Every year, a national panel appointed by the government selects the winning entry, and the award ceremony is held in Dhaka. 1989 was the 14th National Film Awards.

== List of winners ==
This year awards were given in 16 categories. Awards for Best Film was not given in 1989.

=== Merit awards ===
Name of Awards	Winner(s)	Film
Best Director	A. J. Mintu	Satya Mithya
Best Actor	Alamgir	Khotipuron
Best Actress	Shabana	Ranga Bhabi
Best Actor in a Supporting Role	Black Anwar	Byathar Daan
Best Actress in a Supporting Role	Khaleda Aktar Kolpona	The Master of Jinns
Best Child Artist	Master Johnson	Satya Mithya
Best Music Director	Ali Hossain	Byathar Daan
Best Lyrics	Moniruzzaman Monir	Chetona
Best Male Playback Singer	Andrew Kishore	Khotipuron
Best Female Playback Singer	Runa Laila	Accident

=== Technical awards ===
Name of Awards	Winner(s)	Film
Best Art Director	Abdus Sabur	The Affliction of Estrangement
Best Screenplay	A. J. Mintu	Satya Mithya
Best Cinematography	Arun Roy	Bhaijan
Best Editing	Mujibur Rahman Dulu	Satya Mithya
Best Sound Editing	Mafizul Haque	Khotipuron
Best Dialogue	Chatku Ahmed	Satya Mithya

== See also ==
- Bachsas Awards
- Meril Prothom Alo Awards
- Ifad Film Club Award
- Babisas Award
