= 9th Bangladesh National Film Awards =

National Film Awards, Bangladesh

- Awarded for: Best of bangladeshi cinema in 1984
- Awarded by: President of Bangladesh
- Presented by: Ministry of Information
- Presented on: 1984
- Site: Dhaka, Bangladesh
- Official website: www.moi.gov.bd

Highlights
- Best Feature Film: Bhat De
- Best Non-feature Film: Agami
- Best Actor: Nayok Raj Razzak; Chandranath
- Best Actress: Shabana; Bhat De
- Most awards: Bhat De

The 9th Bangladesh National Film Awards (Bengali: জাতীয় চলচ্চিত্র পুরস্কার) were presented by the Ministry of Information, Bangladesh, to felicitate the best of Bangladeshi cinema released in the year 1984. The Bangladesh National Film Awards is a film award ceremony in Bangladesh established in 1975 by the government of Bangladesh. Every year, a national panel appointed by the government selects the winning entry, and the award ceremony is held in Dhaka. 1984 was the 9th ceremony of the National Film Awards.

== List of winners ==
This year awards were given in 19 categories.

=== Merit awards ===
Name of Awards	Winner(s)	Film
Best Film	Abu Zafar Khan (producer)	Bhat De
Best Director	Amjad Hossain	Bhat De
Best Actor	Abdur Razzak	Chandranath
Best Actress	Shabana	Bhat De
Best Actor in a Supporting Role	Sirajul Islam	Chandranath
Best Actress in a Supporting Role	Anwara Begum	The Struggle of Sakhina
Best Child Artist	Akhi Alamgir	Bhat De
Best Music Director	Khandaker Nurul Alam	Chandranath
Best Lyrics	Mohammad Moniruzzaman	Chandranath
Best Male Playback Singer	Subir Nandi	Mahanayak
Best Female Playback Singer	Sabina Yasmin	Chandranath

=== Technical awards ===
Name of Awards	Winner(s)	Film
Best Screenplay	Amjad Hossain	Bhat De
Best Cinematographer (Black and White)	Baby Islam	Obhijan
Best Cinematographer (Color)	Mahfuzur Rahman Khan	Obhijan
Best Art Director	Anjan Bhowmick	Bhat De
Best Editing	Mujibur Rahman Dulu	Bhat De
Best Dialogue	Amjad Hossain	Bhat De
Best Sound Editing	MA Baset	Bhat De

=== Special award ===
- Special Directorial Award - Morshedul Islam for Agami (Short Film)

== See also ==
- Meril Prothom Alo Awards
- Ifad Film Club Award
- Babisas Award
