= 15th Bangladesh National Film Awards =

National Film Awards, Bangladesh

- Awarded for: Best of Bangladeshi cinema in 1990
- Awarded by: President of Bangladesh
- Presented by: Ministry of Information
- Presented on: 1990
- Site: Dhaka, Bangladesh
- Official website: www.moi.gov.bd

Highlights
- Best Feature Film: Goriber Bou
- Best Non-feature Film: Amra Tomader Bhulbo Na
- Best Actor: Alamgir; Moroner Pore
- Best Actress: Shabana; Moroner Pore
- Most awards: Goriber Bou (5)

The 15th Bangladesh National Film Awards were presented by the Ministry of Information, Bangladesh to felicitate the best of Bangladeshi cinema released in 1990. The ceremony took place in Dhaka and awards were given by then president of Bangladesh. The National Film Awards are the only film awards given by the government itself. Every year, a national panel appointed by the government selects the winning entry, and the award ceremony is held in Dhaka. 1990 was the 15th National Film Awards.

== List of winners ==
This year awards were given in 18 categories.

=== Merit awards ===
Name of Awards	Winner(s)	Film
Best Film	S. S. Productions (Producer)	Goriber Bou
Best Short Film		Amra Tomader Bhulbo Na
Best Director	Kamal Ahmed	Goriber Bou
Best Actor	Alamgir	Moroner Pore
Best Actress	Shabana	Moroner Pore
Best Actor in a Supporting Role	Golam Mustafa	Chhutir Phande
Best Actress in a Supporting Role	Anwara	Moroner Pore
Best Child Artist	Dodul	Lakhe Ekta
Best Music Director	Alauddin Ali	Lakhe Ekta
Best Lyrics	Moniruzzaman Monir; Shahidul Haque Khan	Dolna; Chhutir Phande
Best Male Playback Singer	Syed Abdul Hadi	Goriber Bou
Best Female Playback Singer	Shahnaz Rahmatullah	Chhutir Phande

=== Technical awards ===
Name of Awards	Winner(s)	Film
Best Screenplay	Shibli Sadik	Dolna
Best Art Director	Abdus Sabur	Surjogrohon
Best Editing	Aminul Islam Mintu and Zinnat Hossain Biplob	Goriber Bou
Best Sound Editing	Mafizul Haque	Dolna

=== Special awards ===
- Best Child Artist (Special) - Master Dodul for ?

== See also ==
- Bachsas Awards
- Meril Prothom Alo Awards
- Ifad Film Club Award
- Babisas Award
