= 16th Bangladesh National Film Awards =

National Film Awards, Bangladesh

- Awarded for: Best of bangladeshi cinema in 1991
- Awarded by: President of Bangladesh
- Presented by: Ministry of Information
- Presented on: 1991
- Site: Dhaka, Bangladesh
- Official website: moi.gov.bd

Highlights
- Best Feature Film: Padma Meghna Jamuna
- Best Non-feature Film: Godhuli
- Best Actor: Alamgir; Pita Mata Santan
- Best Actress: Shabana; Achena
- Most awards: Padma Meghna Jamuna (6)

The 16th Bangladesh National Film Awards were presented by the Ministry of Information, Bangladesh, to felicitate the best of Bangladeshi cinema released in 1991. The ceremony took place in Dhaka, and awards were given by the president of Bangladesh. The National Film Awards are the only film awards given by the government itself. Every year, a national panel appointed by the government selects the winning entry, and the award ceremony is held in Dhaka. 1991 was the 16th ceremony of the National Film Awards.

== List of winners ==
This year awards were given in 18 categories.

=== Merit awards ===
Name of Awards	Winner(s)	Film
Best Film		Padma Meghna Jamuna
Best Short Film		Godhuli
Best Director	A. J. Mintu	Pita Mata Sontan
Best Actor	Alamgir	Pita Mata Sontan
Best Actress	Shabana	Achena
Best Actor in a Supporting Role	Wasimul Bari Rajib	Danga
Best Actress in a Supporting Role	Nuton	Streer Paona
Best Child Artist	Master Joyson	The Consolation
Best Music Director	Khandaker Nurul Alam	Padma Meghna Jamuna
Best Lyrics	Nazrul Islam Babu	Padma Meghna Jamuna
Best Male Playback Singer	Andrew Kishore	Padma Meghna Jamuna
Best Female Playback Singer	Sabina Yasmin	Danga

=== Technical awards ===
Name of Awards	Winner(s)	Film
Best Screenplay	Kazi Morshed; Shibli Sadiq	The Consolation; Achena
Best Story	Mohammed Mohihuddin	Padma Meghna Jamuna
Best Cinematography	Abu Hena Bablu	Pita Mata Sontan
Best Art Direction	Mohihuddin Faruk	Pita Mata Sontan
Best Editing	Mujibur Rahman Dulu	Pita Mata Sontan
Best Sound Editing	Mohammed Zahangir	Padma Meghna Jamuna

== See also ==
- Meril Prothom Alo Awards
- Ifad Film Club Award
- Babisas Award
