= 23rd Bangladesh National Film Awards =

National Film Awards, Bangladesh

- Awarded for: Best of Bangladeshi cinema in 1998
- Awarded by: President of Bangladesh
- Presented by: Ministry of Information
- Presented on: 1999
- Site: Dhaka, Bangladesh
- Official website: Official website

Highlights
- Best Actor: Ferdous Ahmed; Hothat Brishti

The 23rd Bangladesh National Film Awards, presented by Ministry of Information, Bangladesh to felicitate the best of Bangladeshi Cinema released in the year 1998. The ceremony took place in Dhaka and awards were given by then President of Bangladesh. The National Film Awards are the only film awards given by the government itself. Every year, a national panel appointed by the government selects the winning entry, and the award ceremony is held in Dhaka. 1998 was the 23rd ceremony of National Film Awards.

== List of winners ==
=== Merit awards ===
| Name of Awards | Winner(s) | Film |
|---|---|---|
| Best Film | | |
| Best Director | | |
| Best Actor | Ferdous Ahmed | Hothat Brishti |
| Best Actress | | |
| Best Actor in a Supporting Role | | |
| Best Actress in a Supporting Role | | |
| Best Actor in a Comic Role | | |
| Best Music Director | | |
| Best Music Composer | | |
| Best Lyrics | | |
| Best Male Playback Singer | | |

=== Technical awards ===
| Name of Awards | Winner(s) | Film |
|---|---|---|
| Best Cinematography | Akhtar Hossain | Hothat Brishti |
| Best Story | | |
| Best Art Direction | | |
| Best Makeup | | |

== See also ==
- Meril Prothom Alo Awards
- Ifad Film Club Award
- Babisas Award
