= 3rd Bangladesh National Film Awards =

National Film Awards, Bangladesh

- Awarded for: Best of Bangladeshi cinema in 1977
- Awarded by: President of Bangladesh
- Presented by: Ministry of Information
- Announced on: June 17, 1978
- Presented on: 9 January 1979
- Site: Vice President's House, Dhaka, Bangladesh
- Official website: moi.gov.bd

Highlights
- Best Feature Film: Bosundhora
- Best Actor: Bulbul Ahmed; Simana Periye
- Best Actress: Bobita; Bosundhora
- Most awards: Bosundhora (5)

The 3rd Bangladesh National Film Awards (Bengali: জাতীয় চলচ্চিত্র পুরস্কার) were given by the Government of Bangladesh for releases in 1977. It was the third ceremony of National Film Awards. Every year, a national panel appointed by the government selects the winning entry. This year awards were given by Ziaur Rahman, the President of Bangladesh, at the Vice President's House in Dhaka on January 9, 1979.

== List of winners ==
This year awards were given in total 11 categories. Best Actor in a Supporting Role, Best Child Artist, and Best Male Playback Singer awards were not given this year.

=== Merit awards ===
Name of Awards	Winner(s)	Film
Best Film	Subhash Dutta (Producer)	Bosundhora
Best Director	Subhash Dutta	Bosundhora
Best Actor	Bulbul Ahmed	Simana Periye
Best Actress	Bobita	Bosundhora
Best Actress in a Supporting Role	Shabana	Janani
Best Music Director	Azad Rahman	Jadur Bashi
Best Female Playback Singer	Runa Laila	Jadur Bashi (Jadu Bina Pakhi)

=== Technical awards ===
Name of Awards	Winner(s)	Film
Best Screenplay	Ahmed Zaman Chowdhury	Jadur Bashi
Best Dialogue	Alamgir Kabir	Simana Periye
Best Cinematography (Black and White)	Reza Latif	Ananta Prem
Best Cinematography (Color)	MA Mobin	Simana Periye
Best Art Director	Mohiuddin Faruque	Bosundhora
Best Storyteller	Alauddin Al Azad	Bosundhora
Best Editing	Bashir Hossain	Simana Periye
Best Sound Editing	Mohiuddin Faruque	Bosundhora

== Achievements ==
- Bobita won her third award in Best Actress category.

== See also ==
- Bachsas Awards
- Meril Prothom Alo Awards
- Ifad Film Club Award
- Babisas Award
