= 4th Bangladesh National Film Awards =

National Film Awards, Bangladesh

- Awarded for: Best of bangladeshi cinema in 1978
- Awarded by: President of Bangladesh
- Presented by: Ministry of Information
- Announced on: September 10, 1979
- Presented on: 14 November 1979
- Site: Vice President's House, Dhaka, Bangladesh
- Official website: Official website

Highlights
- Best Feature Film: Golapi Ekhon Traine
- Best Actor: Nayok Raj Razzak; Ashikkhito
- Best Actress: Kabori; Sareng Bou
- Most awards: Golapi Ekhon Traine (9)

The 4th Bangladesh National Film Awards, presented by Ministry of Information, Bangladesh to felicitate the best of Bangladeshi Cinema released in the year 1978. Ceremony took place at Vice President's House, Dhaka on November 14, 1979, and awards were given by Ziaur Rahman, President of Bangladesh.

== List of winners ==
Awards were given in 16 categories out of 20 categories. Category for Best Lyrics was introduced in 1978 and the Amjad Hossain became the first recipient of Best Lyricist award.

=== Merit awards ===
Name of Awards	Winner(s)	Film
Best Film	Amjad Hossain (Producer)	Golapi Ekhon Traine
Best Director	Amjad Hossain	Golapi Ekhon Traine
Best Actor	Abdur Razzak; Bulbul Ahmed	Ashikkhito; Bodhu Biday
Best Actress	Kabori Sarwar	Sareng Bou
Best Actor in a Supporting Role	Anwar Hossain	Golapi Ekhon Traine
Best Actress in a Supporting Role	Anwara	Golapi Ekhon Traine
Best Child Artist	Master Shakil; Master Sumon	Dumurer Phool; Ashikkhito
Best Music Director	Alauddin Ali	Golapi Ekhon Traine
Best Lyrics	Amjad Hossain	Golapi Ekhon Traine
Best Male Playback Singer	Syed Abdul Hadi	Golapi Ekhon Traine
Best Female Playback Singer	Sabina Yasmin	Alangkar

=== Technical awards ===
Name of Awards	Winner(s)	Film
Best Screenplay	Amjad Hossain	Golapi Ekhon Traine
Best Cinematography (Black and White)	Arun Roy	Bodhu Biday
Best Cinematography (Color)	Rafiqul Bari Chowdhury	Golapi Ekhon Traine
Best Editing	Nurunnabi	Dumurer Phool
Best Art Direction	Mohihuddin Faruq	Dumurer Phool

== See also ==
- Meril Prothom Alo Awards
- Ifad Film Club Award
- Babisas Award
