= 25th Bangladesh National Film Awards =

National Film Awards, Bangladesh

- Awarded for: Best of Bangladeshi cinema in 2000
- Awarded by: President of Bangladesh
- Presented by: Ministry of Information
- Announced on: August 5, 2003
- Presented on: September 10, 2003
- Site: Osmany Memorial Hall, Dhaka, Bangladesh
- Official website: moi.gov.bd

Highlights
- Best Feature Film: Kittonkhola
- Best Actor: Riaz; Dui Duari
- Best Actress: Champa; Uttarer Khep
- Most awards: Kittonkhola (8)

The 25th Bangladesh National Film Awards were presented by the Ministry of Information, Bangladesh, to felicitate the best of Bangladeshi cinema released in the year 2000. The National Film Awards are the only film awards given by the government itself. Every year, a national panel appointed by the government selects the winning entry, and the award ceremony is held in Dhaka. The ceremony took place at Osmany Memorial Hall, Dhaka, and awards were distributed by Prime Minister Khaleda Zia. Additionally, Information Minister Tariqul Islam attended the function as the special guest that evening.

== List of winners ==
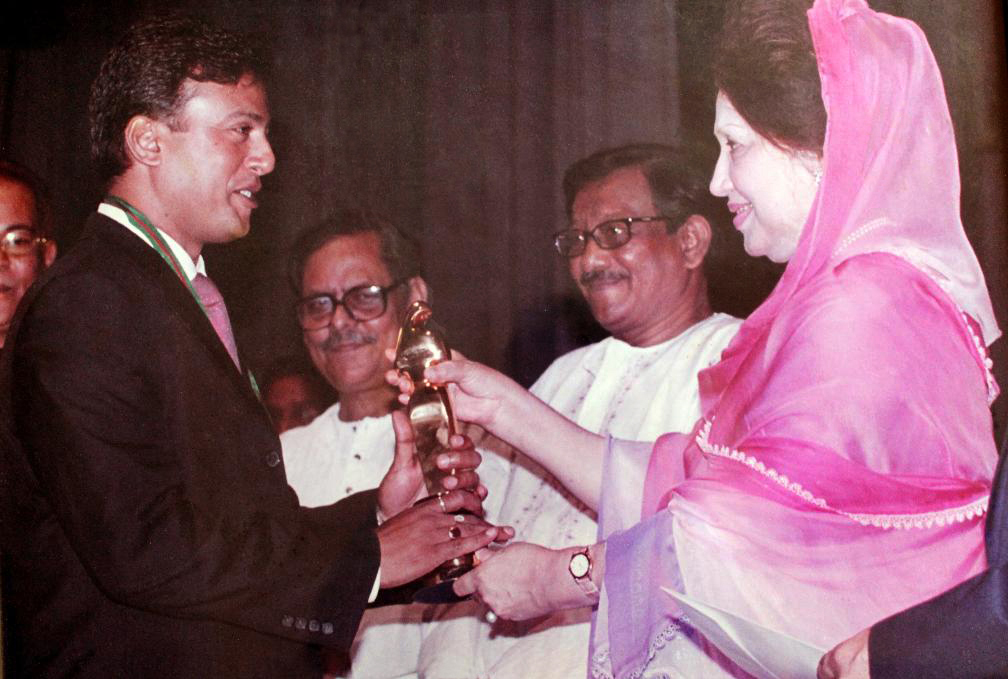
Riaz taking National Film Awards from Prime Minister Khaleda Zia in 2003

A 12-member jury board headed by former secretary A H Mofazzal Karim recommended a total of 16 artists to be awarded for 2000. No awards were given in the Best Music Director or Best Lyrics categories in 2000.

=== Merit awards ===
Name of Awards	Winner(s)	Film
Best Film	Impress Telefilm Limited (Producer)	Kittonkhola
Best Director	Abu Sayeed	Kittonkhola
Best Actor	Riaz	Dui Duari
Best Actress	Champa	Uttarer Khep
Best Actor in a Supporting Role	Wasimul Bari Rajib	Bidroh Charidike
Best Actress in a Supporting Role	Tamalika Karmakar	Kittonkhola
Best Male Playback Singer	Andrew Kishore	Aj Gaye Holud
Best Female Playback Singer	Sabina Yasmin	Dui Duari

=== Technical awards ===
Name of Awards	Winner(s)	Film
Best Story	Selim Al Din	Kittonkhola
Best Cinematography	Mahfuzur Rahman Khan	Dui Duari
Best Dialogue	Abu Sayeed and Selim Al Din	Kittonkhola
Best Screenplay	Mahfuzur Rahman Khan	Dui Duari
Best Art Direction	Tarun Ghosh	Kittonkhola
Best Editing	Sujan Mahmud	Kittonkhola
Best Sound Editing	Nasim Reza Shah	Kittonkhola
Best Makeup	Khalilur Rahman	Jodda

== See also ==
- Bachsas Awards
- Meril Prothom Alo Awards
- Ifad Film Club Award
- Babisas Award
