= 8th Bangladesh National Film Awards =

National Film Awards, Bangladesh

- Awarded for: Best of bangladeshi cinema in 1983
- Awarded by: President of Bangladesh
- Presented by: Ministry of Information
- Presented on: 1983
- Site: Dhaka, Bangladesh
- Official website: www.moi.gov.bd

Highlights
- Best Feature Film: Puraskar
- Best Actor: Sohel Rana; Lalu Bhulu
- Best Actress: Shabana; Nazma
- Most awards: Puroskar (4)

The 8th Bangladesh National Film Awards were presented by the Ministry of Information, Bangladesh to felicitate the best of Bangladeshi cinema released in the year 1983. The ceremony took place in Dhaka in 1983 and awards were given by the then president of Bangladesh. Every year, a national panel appointed by the government selects the winning entry, and the award ceremony is held in Dhaka.

== List of winners ==
For 1983, awards were given in 10 categories. Awards for Best Child Artist, Best Music Director, Best Male Playback Singer, Best Female Playback Singer, Best Art Director, Best Editing were not given in 1983.

=== Merit awards ===
Name of Awards	Winner(s)	Film
Best Film	Satya Saha (Producer)	Puroskar
Best Director	Kamal Ahmed	Lalu Bhulu
Best Actor	Sohel Rana	Lalu Bhulu
Best Actress	Shabana	Nazma
Best Actor in a Supporting Role	Shakil	Lalu Bhulu
Best Actress in a Supporting Role	Suborna Mustafa	Notun Bou

=== Technical awards ===
Name of Awards	Winner(s)	Film
Best Screenplay	Syed Shamsul Haque	Puroskar
Best Cinematographer (Black and White)	Anwar Hossain	Puroskar
Best Cinematographer (Color)	Arun Roy	Johny
Best Dialogue	Syed Shamsul Haque	Puroskar

== See also ==
- Meril Prothom Alo Awards
- Ifad Film Club Award
- Babisas Award
