= 6th Bangladesh National Film Awards =

National Film Awards, Bangladesh

- Awarded for: Best of Bangladeshi cinema in 1980
- Awarded by: President of Bangladesh
- Presented by: Ministry of Information
- Presented on: 1980
- Site: Dhaka, Bangladesh
- Official website: moi.gov.bd

Highlights
- Best Feature Film: Emiler Goenda Bahini
- Best Actor: Bulbul Ahmed; Shesh Uttar
- Best Actress: Shabana; Sokhi Tumi Kar
- Most awards: Emiler Goenda Bahini (5)

The 6th Bangladesh National Film Awards (Bengali: জাতীয় চলচ্চিত্র পুরস্কার), presented by Ministry of Information, Bangladesh to felicitate the best of Bangladeshi Cinema released in the year 1980. Bangladesh National Film Awards is a film award ceremony in Bangladesh established in 1975 by Government of Bangladesh. A national panel appointed by the government selects the winning entry, and the award ceremony is held in Dhaka. 1980 was the 6th ceremony of Bangladesh National Film Award.

== List of winners ==
This year awards were given in 18 categories.

=== Merit awards ===
Name of Awards	Winner(s)	Film
Best Film	Badal Rahman	Emiler Goenda Bahini
Best Director	Abdullah Al Mamun	Ekhoni Somoy
Best Actor	Bulbul Ahmed	Shesh Uttar
Best Actress	Shabana	Sokhi Tumi Kar
Best Actor in a Supporting Role	Golam Mustafa	Emiler Goenda Bahini
Best Actress in a Supporting Role	Rozina	Koshai
Best Child Artist	Tiptip; Master Shakil	Emiler Goenda Bahini; Danpite Chhele
Best Music Director	Alauddin Ali	Koshai
Best Lyrics	Khan Ataur Rahman	Danpite Chhele
Best Male Playback Singer	Syed Abdul Hadi	Koshai
Best Female Playback Singer	Sabina Yasmin	Koshai

=== Technical awards ===
Name of Awards	Winner(s)	Film
Best Screenplay	Khan Ataur Rahman	Danpite Chhele
Best Cinematographer (Black and White)	Shafiqul Islam Swapan	Ghuddi
Best Cinematographer (Color)	Anwar Hossain	Emiler Goenda Bahini
Best Art Director	Abdus Sabur	Surjogrohon
Best Editing	Badal Rahman	Emiler Goenda Bahini
Best Dialogue	Salahuddin Jaki	Ghuddi
Best Sound Editing	Mustafa Kamal	Jodi Jantem

== See also ==
- Bachsas Awards
- Meril Prothom Alo Awards
- Ifad Film Club Award
- Babisas Award
