= 11th Bangladesh National Film Awards =

National Film Awards, Bangladesh

- Awarded for: Best of Bangladeshi cinema in 1986
- Awarded by: President of Bangladesh
- Presented by: Ministry of Information
- Presented on: 1986
- Site: Dhaka, Bangladesh
- Official website: www.moi.gov.bd

Highlights
- Best Feature Film: Shubhoda
- Best Actor: Ghulam Mustafa and Ilias Kanchan (tie); Shuvoda and Parineeta
- Best Actress: Anwara and Anjana (tie); Shuvoda and Parineeta
- Most awards: Shuvoda (12)

The 11th Bangladesh National Film Awards (Bengali: জাতীয় চলচ্চিত্র পুরস্কার) were presented by the Ministry of Information, Bangladesh, to felicitate the best of Bangladeshi cinema released in the year 1986. The Bangladesh National Film Awards is a film award ceremony in Bangladesh established in 1975 by the government of Bangladesh. Every year, a national panel appointed by the government selects the winning entry, and the award ceremony is held in Dhaka. 1986 was the 11th ceremony of Bangladesh National Film Award.

== List of winners ==
A total of 16 artists were awarded in this ceremony. Best Screenplay award was not given in 1986.

=== Merit awards ===
Name of Awards	Winner(s)	Film
Best Film	A. K. M. Jahangir Khan (Producer)	Shuvoda
Best Director	Chashi Nazrul Islam	Shuvoda
Best Actor	Golam Mustafa; Ilias Kanchan	Shuvoda; Parineeta
Best Actress	Anwara Begum; Anjana Sultana	Shuvoda; Parineeta
Best Actor in a Supporting Role	Ashish Kumar Louho	Parineeta
Best Actress in a Supporting Role	Jinat	Shuvoda
Best Child Artist	Kamrunnahar Azad Swapna	Mayer Dabi
Best Music Director	Khandaker Nurul Alam	Shuvoda
Best Lyrics	Mohammad Moniruzzaman	Shuvoda
Best Male Playback Singer	Subir Nandi	Shuvoda
Best Female Playback Singer	Nilufar Yasmin	Shuvoda (Eto Sukh Soibe Kemon Kore)

=== Technical awards ===
Name of Awards	Winner(s)	Film
Best Cinematography (Black and White)	Sadhan Roy	Shuvoda
Best Cinematography (Color)	Sadhan Roy	Shuvoda
Best Art Director	Abdus Sabur	Surjogrohon
Best Editing	Abdus Sabur	Shuvoda
Best Sound Editing	MA Baset	Shuvoda

== See also ==
- Meril Prothom Alo Awards
- Ifad Film Club Award
- Babisas Award
