= 32nd Bangladesh National Film Awards =

National Film Awards, Bangladesh

- Awarded for: Best of Bangladeshi cinema in 2007
- Awarded by: President of Bangladesh
- Presented by: Ministry of Information
- Presented on: October 23, 2008
- Site: Bangladesh-China Friendship Conference Centre, Dhaka, Bangladesh
- Hosted by: Alamgir and Farzana Brownia
- Official website: moi.gov.bd

Highlights
- Best Feature Film: Daruchini Dwip
- Best Actor: Riaz; Daruchini Dwip
- Best Actress: Zakia Bari Momo; Daruchini Dwip
- Most awards: Daruchini Dwip (7)

The 32nd National Film Awards were presented by the Ministry of Information, Bangladesh, to felicitate the best of Bangladeshi cinema released in the year 2007. The Bangladesh National Film Awards is a film award ceremony in Bangladesh established in 1975 by the government of Bangladesh. Every year, a national panel appointed by the government selects the winning entry, and the award ceremony is held in Dhaka. 2007 was the 32nd installment of the Bangladesh National Film Award. Chief Adviser Fakhruddin Ahmed presented the awards at the Bangladesh-China Friendship Conference Centre on October 23, 2008.

== List of winners ==
An eleven-member jury board chaired by the additional secretary of the Ministry of Information selected the winners in 14 different categories.

=== Merit awards ===
Name of Awards	Winner(s)	Film
Best Film	Faridur Reza Sagar (Impress Telefilm Limited)	Daruchini Dwip
Best Director	Enamul Karim Nirjhar	Aha!
Best Actor	Riaz	Daruchini Dwip
Best Actress	Zakia Bari Momo	Daruchini Dwip
Best Actor in a Supporting Role	Abul Hayat	Daruchini Dwip
Best Actress in a Supporting Role	Nipun Akter	Saajghor
Best Music Director	S.I. Tutul	Daruchini Dwip
Best Lyrics	Munshi Wadud	Saajghor
Best Male Playback Singer	Andrew Kishore	Saajghor
Best Female Playback Singer	Fahmida Nabi	Aha! (Lukochuri Luckochuri Golpo)

=== Technical awards ===
Name of Awards	Winner(s)	Film
Best Screenplay	Humayun Ahmed	Daruchini Dwip
Best Cinematography	Saiful Islam Badal	Aha!
Best Choreography	Kabirul Islam Ratan	Daruchini Dwip
Best Editing	Arghyakamal Mitra	Aha!

== See also ==
- Bachsas Awards
- Meril Prothom Alo Awards
- Ifad Film Club Award
- Babisas Award
