= 31st Bangladesh National Film Awards =

Film award ceremony

- Awarded for: Best of Bangladeshi cinema in 2006
- Awarded by: President of Bangladesh
- Presented by: Ministry of Information
- Presented on: October 23, 2008
- Site: Bangladesh-China Friendship Conference Centre, Dhaka, Bangladesh
- Hosted by: Alamgir and Farzana Brownia
- Official website: moi.gov.bd

Highlights
- Best Feature Film: Ghani: The Cycle
- Best Actor: Arman Parvez Murad; Ghani: The Cycle
- Best Actress: Naznin Hasan Chumki; Ghani: The Cycle
- Most awards: Ghani: The Cycle (13)

The 31st National Film Awards were presented by the Ministry of Information, Bangladesh, to felicitate the best of Bangladeshi cinema released in the year 2006. The Bangladesh National Film Awards is a film award ceremony in Bangladesh established in 1975 by the government of Bangladesh. Every year, a national panel appointed by the government selects the winning entry, and the award ceremony is held in Dhaka. Chief Adviser Fakhruddin Ahmed presented the awards at the Bangladesh-China Friendship Conference Centre on October 23, 2008.

== List of winners ==
An eleven-member jury board chaired by the additional secretary of the Ministry of Information selected the winners in 16 different categories.

=== Merit awards ===
Name of Awards	Winner(s)	Film
Best Film	Kazi Morshed (Producer)	Ghani: The Cycle
Best Director	Kazi Morshed	Ghani: The Cycle
Best Actor	Arman Parvez Murad	Ghani: The Cycle
Best Actress	Naznin Hasan Chumki	Ghani: The Cycle
Best Actor in a Supporting Role	Masum Aziz and Raisul Islam Asad	Ghani: The Cycle
Best Actress in a Supporting Role	Dolly Johur	Ghani: The Cycle
Best Child Artist	Prarthona Fardin Dighi	Kabuliwala
Best Music Director	Sheikh Sadi Khan	Ghani: The Cycle
Best Male Playback Singer	Asif Akbar	Rani Kuthir Baki Itihash
Best Female Playback Singer	Samina Chowdhury	Rani Kuthir Baki Itihash

=== Technical awards ===
Name of Awards	Winner(s)	Film
Best Story	Kazi Morshed	Ghani: The Cycle
Best Dialogue	Kazi Morshed	Ghani: The Cycle
Best Screenplay	Kazi Morshed	Ghani: The Cycle
Best Cinematography	Hasan Ahmed	Ghani: The Cycle
Best Editing	Raisul Islam Asad	Ghani: The Cycle

== See also ==
- Bachsas Film Awards
- Meril Prothom Alo Awards
- Ifad Film Club Award
- Babisas Award
