= 24th Bangladesh National Film Awards =

Annual awards ceremony

- Awarded for: Best of Bangladeshi cinema in 1999
- Awarded by: President of Bangladesh
- Presented by: Ministry of Information
- Announced on: August 5, 2003
- Presented on: September 10, 2003
- Site: Osmany Memorial Hall, Dhaka, Bangladesh
- Official website: moi.gov.bd

Highlights
- Best Feature Film: Chitra Nodir Pare
- Best Actor: Zahid Hasan; Srabon Megher Din
- Best Actress: Shimla; Madam Phooli
- Most awards: Chitra Nodir Pare (7); Srabon Megher Din (7)

The 24th Bangladesh National Film Awards were presented by the Ministry of Information, Bangladesh, to felicitate the best of Bangladeshi cinema released in the year 1999. The National Film Awards are the only film awards given by the government itself. Every year, a national panel appointed by the government selects the winning entry, and the award ceremony is held in Dhaka. The ceremony took place at Osmany Memorial Hall, Dhaka, and awards were distributed by Prime Minister Khaleda Zia. Additionally, Information Minister Tariqul Islam attended the function as the special guest that evening.

== List of winners ==
A 12-member jury board headed by former secretary A H Mofazzal Karim recommended a total of 18 artists to be awarded for 1999.

=== Merit awards ===
Name of Awards	Winner(s)	Film
Best Film	Tanvir Mokammel	Chitra Nodir Pare
Best Director	Tanvir Mokammel	Chitra Nodir Pare
Best Actor	Zahid Hasan	Srabon Megher Din
Best Actress	Shimla	Madam Fuli
Best Actor in a Supporting Role	Golam Mustafa	Srabon Megher Din
Best Actress in a Supporting Role		Chitra Nodir Pare
Best Actor in a Comic Role	A.T.M. Shamsuzzaman	Madam Fuli
Best Music Director	Maksud Jamil Mintu	Srabon Megher Din
Best Music Composer	Alam Khan	Bagher Thaba
Best Lyrics	Rashid Uddin	Srabon Megher Din
Best Male Playback Singer	Subir Nandi	Srabon Megher Din

=== Technical awards ===
Name of Awards	Winner(s)	Film
Best Story	Tanvir Mokammel	Chitra Nodir Pare
Best Dialogue	Tanvir Mokammel	Chitra Nodir Pare
Best Cinematography	Mahfuzur Rahman Khan	Srabon Megher Din
Best Screenplay	Kazi Hayat	Ammajan
Best Art Direction	Uttom Guha	Chitra Nodir Pare
Best Sound Recording	Mofizul Haque	Srabon Megher Din
Best Makeup	Dipak Kumar Sur	Chitra Nodir Pare

== See also ==
- Bachsas Awards
- Meril Prothom Alo Awards
- Ifad Film Club Award
- Babisas Award
