= 5th Bangladesh National Film Awards =

National Film Awards, Bangladesh

- Awarded for: Best of Bangladeshi cinema in 1979
- Awarded by: President of Bangladesh
- Presented by: Ministry of Information
- Presented on: 1980
- Site: Dhaka, Bangladesh
- Official website: www.moi.gov.bd

Highlights
- Best Feature Film: Surjo Dighol Bari
- Best Actor: Not Awarded
- Best Actress: Dolly Anwar; Surjo Dighol Bari
- Most awards: Sundori (8)

The 5th National Film Awards was presented by the Ministry of Information, Bangladesh to recognise the best of Bangladeshi cinema released in the year 1979. The ceremony took place in Dhaka in 1980 and awards were given by the President of Bangladesh.

== List of winners ==
A total of 16 awards were given for this year. The award for Best Actor was not given this year.

=== Merit awards ===
Name of Awards	Awardee(s)	Film
Best Film	Masihuddin Shaker	Surjo Dighol Bari
Best Director	Masihuddin Shaker and Sheikh Niamat Ali	Surjo Dighol Bari
Best Actress	Dolly Anwar	Surjo Dighol Bari
Best Actor in a Supporting Role	Saifuddin Ahmed	Sundori
Best Actress in a Supporting Role	Anwara Begum	Sundori
Best Child Artist	Sojib and Elora Gohor	Surjo Dighol Bari
Best Music Director	Alauddin Ali	Sundori
Best Lyrics	Amjad Hossain`	Sundori
Best Male Playback Singer	Syed Abdul Hadi	Sundori
Best Female Playback Singer	Sabina Yasmin	Sundori

=== Technical awards ===
Name of Awards	Awardee(s)	Film
Best Screenplay	Masihuddin Shaker and Sheikh Niamat Ali	Surjo Dighol Bari
Best Cinematography (Black & White)	Anwar Hossain	Surjo Dighol Bari
Best Art Direction	Abdus Sabur	Aradhana
Best Editing	Saidul Anam Tutul	Surjo Dighol Bari
Best Dialogue	Amjad Hossain	Sundori

=== Special Award ===
- Best Child Artist - Master Lelin (Surjo Dighol Bari)

== See also ==
- Bachsas Awards
- Meril Prothom Alo Awards
- Ifad Film Club Award
- Babisas Award
