= Babisas Award =

Bangladeshi entertainment award

- Awarded for: Excellence in media achievements
- Country: Bangladesh
- Presented by: Bangladesh Entertainment Journalist Association
- First award: 2004
- Website: www.babisas.net

The Babisas Award is given by the Bangladesh Entertainment Journalist Association (Bangladesh Binodon Shangbadik Somiti; BABISAS) every year for best performances in media. BABISAS is an organization for progressive entertainment journalists.

The Bangladesh Entertainment Journalist Association was formally created on 30 December 2000 on the initiative and effort of journalists. After two years, it was registered with the Directorate of Social Service, affiliated with Ministry of People's Republic of Bangladesh Government, Dhaka, registration no. Dha – 07147.

== History ==
The award has been given since 2004. Babisas is mainly a voluntary welfare organization. Giving active support in preserving the rights of members carrying out professional responsibility and giving moral and logistic support to the members who came to harm while carrying out their responsibilities, creating fund for various welfare of journalists, and introducing awards for special contributions of journalists.

Babisas wants to improve entertainment journalists' skills, experience, and enrichment. They also support the growth of traditional culture on a national level.

== Awards ==
- Best Actor (cinema)
- Best Actress (cinema)
- Most Popular Actor (cinema)
- Most Popular Actress (cinema)
- Best Playback Singer (male)
- Best Playback Singer (female)
- Best Actor (drama)
- Best Actress (drama)
- Best Actor (drama serial)
- Best Actress (drama serial)
- Most Popular Singer (male)
- Best Popular Singer (female)
- Best Music Director (audio)
- Best Radio Jockey (Radio)
- Best Music Director (film)
- Best Journalist (Entertainment)
- Best Lyric Writer (audio)
- Best Lyric Writer (film)

== Babisas Award 2012 ==
Category	Nominees	Winner
Best Actor (Film)		Nirab Hossain
Best Actress (Drama)		Moushumi Hamid
Best Playback Singer (female)		Kona
Best Model		Mehazabien
Most Popular Singer (male)		Imran, Shahid, Belal Khan, Arif
Best Playback Singer (male)		Hridoy Khan
Most Popular Singer (female)		Eva Rahman, Sabrina Porshi, Nirjhor, Puja, Shirin, Munni,
Most Popular RJ (Radio Jockey)		RJ Saimur, RadioSwadesh.net
People's Choice Singer		Aryan Ashik
Upcoming Film Star		Jahnvi
Life Time Achievement		Nayak Raj Razzak, Dilara Jaman, Mostofa Jaman Abbasi
Babisas Award for Featured Actor (Male)		Symon Sadik Winner in (2016)

== Babisas Award 2011 ==
Category	Nominees	Winner
Best Actor (Film)	Ananta Jalil, Ferdous Ahmed, Shakib Khan	
Best Actress (Film)	Apu Biswas, Purnima(actress), Borsha	
Most Popular Actor (Film)	Mosharrof Karim, Jahid Hasan, Amin Khan	
Most Popular Actress (Film)	Joya Ahsan, Moushumi, Poppy	
Best Playback Singer (male)	Arfin Rumey, Monir Khan	
Best Playback Singer (female)	Baby Naznin, Nancy	
Best RJ (Radio Jockey)	RJ Saimur, RadioSwadesh.net	

== Babisas Award 2015 ==
Category	Nominees	Winner
Best Singer		
Best Music Director		
Best Actor (Film)		
Best Actress (Film)		
Most Popular Journalist		Rj Saimur
Most Popular Actress (Film)		
Best Online Writers Organizer		M. Arman Uz Zuha

== Babisas Award 2018 ==
Category	Nominees	Winner
Lifetime Achievement Award		Anwara Begum, Ilias Javed
Best Actor (Film)		Chanchal Chowdhury, Kazi Maruf, Fazlur Rahman
Best Actress (Drama)		Pori Moni, Moushumi Hamid
Best Singer (female)		Konal, Samiya Jahan
Best Model		
Most Popular Singer (male)		
Best Singer (male)		Kumar Bishwajit, Fakir Shahabuddin, S.I. Tutul, Belal Khan, Shwapnil Shojib
Most Popular Singer (female)		
Most Popular RJ (Radio Jockey)		
People's Choice Singer		
Upcoming Film Star		
Life Time Achievement		
Babisas Award for Featured Actor (Male)

== Babisas Award 2019 ==
Category	Nominees	Winner
Best Singer)		Sayera Reza
Best Music Director		JK Majlish
Best Actor (Film)		
Best Actress (Film)		
Most Popular Actor (Film)		
Most Popular Actress (Film)		

== Babisas Award 2020 ==
Category	Nominees	Winner
Best Actor (Film)		
Best Actress (Drama)		
Best Playback Singer (female)		
Best Model		
Most Popular Singer (male)		
Best Playback Singer (male)		
Most Popular Singer (female)		
Most Popular RJ (Radio Jockey)		
People's Choice Singer		
Upcoming Film Star		
Life Time Achievement		
Babisas Award for Featured Actor (Male)

== Babisas Award 2021 ==
Category	Nominees	Winner
Lifetime Achievement Award		Mamunur Rashid
Lifetime Achievement Award		Chatku Ahmed
Best Actor (Film)		
Best Actress (Drama)		
Best Singer (female)		Mariom Maria
Best Playback Singer (female)		Momtaz Begum
Best Model		
Most Popular Singer (male)		
Best Playback Singer (male)		
Most Popular Singer (female)		
Most Popular RJ (Radio Jockey)		
People's Choice Singer		
Upcoming Film Star		
Life Time Achievement		
Babisas Award for Featured Actor (Male)		
Best Colorist Web (Ladies and Gentlemen)		Rashaduzzaman Shohag

== Babisas Award 2022 ==
Category	Nominees	Winner
Lifetime Achievement Award		Dolly Zahur, Chanchal Mahmud, Munmun Ahmed
Best Actor (Film)		Siam Ahmed
Best Actress (Film)		Nazifa Tushi, Shirin Shila
Best Actress (Drama)		Tama Mirza
Most Popular Actress of the year		Apu Biswas
Best Playback Singer (female)		Luipa
Best Producer		Ehsanul Haque Babu
Most Popular Singer (male)		Arfin Rumey
Best Playback Singer (male)		Hridoy Khan
Most Popular Singer (female)		Atiya anisa
Best Child Artist		Simrin Lubaba
Best Art Director		Shihab Nurun Nabi
Most Popular Script Writer (male)		Rajib Moni Das
Most Popular Television Director (male)		Babul Uddin
Best Film Cinematographer		Monir Hossain ( Mithu Monir) Film " Gontobbo"
Best Producer		Ayer Mohammad Sentu
Best Keyboardist		Muhammad Ahmudul Haque
Life Time Achievement		
Babisas Award for Featured Actor (Male)
Best Editor Web Film (Mayashalik)		Rashaduzzaman Shohag

== Babisas Award 2023-2024 ==
Category	Nominees	Winner		
Lifetime Achievement		Anwara Begum, Ashraf Uddin Ahmed Ujjal, Ferdous Ara		
Special Achievement		Dr. Mahfuzur Rahman, Film Actress Rozina, Film Actor Rubel, Tasik Ahmed, Moniruzzaman Monir		
Best Actor (Film)		Nirob Hossain, Siyam Ahmed		
Best Actress (Film)		Rumana Islam Mukti, Jaya Ahsan, Puja Cherry		
Best Actor (Webfilm, OTT)		Mamnun Emon		
Best Actress (Webfilm, OTT)		Samia Othoi		
Best Actor Villain (Film)		Shiva Sanu, Rashed Mamun Apu		
Best Director (Film)		Bodiul Alam Khokon		
Popular Film Actress		Shobnom Parveen, Rokeya Chowdhury Keya & Kamrunnahar Anna		
Best Male Singer		Asif Akbar, Robi Chowdhury & Monir khan		
Best Female Singer		RiZia Parveen		
Popular Singer (Male)		Poran, Rubel Khandakar		
Most Popular Singer		Sojib Shan		
Most Popular Singer (Female)		Mousumi Chowdhury & Shilpi Biswas		
Best Drama Director (Female)		Naznin Hasan Khan		
Best Drama Director (Male)		K. M. MAHAMUD HASSAN & MD Fahad		
Best Composer		Ethun Babu		
Best Music Director		Md. Abu Naser Farhad (AN Farhad)		
Music Director		S K Sagor Shaan		
Best Presenter		Rashid Newton, Vabna Ahmed		
Best Content Creator		Robin Rafan (Obidur Rahman) -	Popular Music Couple	Nowshin Tabassum Sharan & Momin Biswas
Best Dance Artist		Mofassol ALif, Sarwar Shakil & Razmin Shetu		
Best Model		Khaled Hossain Chowdhury		
Jury Award		Sachinoor Sachi, Sanjida jahan mukta, Jannatul Ferdous Sanu, Azmira Aktewr Saomi, Silvi Khan Toma, Falguni Ahmed Laboni		
Best TV Actor		Golam Kibria Tanvir & Enayet Ullah Syed (Shipul Syed)		
Best Dramatist (Femail)		Arpona Rani Rajbongshi		
Best Dramatist (Male)		Faridul Islam Rubel		
Best Young Entrepreneur		Naem Shajal		
Best Travel Agency Entrepreneur		Md Opu Sarker		

== Babisas Committee 2023–2025 ==
1. Founder President : Abul Hossain Mozumder
2. Vice Presidents:
- Muslim Dhali
- Jahangir Sikder
- Azim Khan
- Salam Mahamud
1. General Secretary : Rashid Newton
2. Join Secretary : RJ Saimur Rahman
3. Organiser Secretary : Faruk Mojumder
4. Joint Organiser Secretary : Forhad Mojumder
5. Finance Secretary : Monowar Munna
6. Office Secretary : Jabed Mojumder
7. Publicity Secretary : Firoz Alam Badal
8. Social Welfare Secretary :Razia Sultana
9. Cultural Secretary : Bashir Ahmed
10. IT Secretary: Arafat Akash
11. Executive Member :
- Mozammel Hoque Raju
- Khokon Chowdhury
- Farid Alam Farid
- Masud Rana Jhumur
- Biplob Hossain Prince
- Nayem Sajal
- Abu Bakkar Sipon

== See also ==
- National Film Awards (Bangladesh)
- Meril Prothom Alo Awards
- Bachsas Awards
- Ifad Film Club Award
- Channel i Music Awards
