= Ifad Film Club Award =

- Awarded for: Excellence in cinematic achievements for Dhallywood
- Country: Bangladesh
- Presented by: Bangladesh Film Club & Ifad Group
- First award: 2012

The Ifad Film Club Award is presented by Bangladesh Film Club to honour performances in different sectors of films. The official sponsor of the award is Ifad Group and the media partner is NTV.

== History ==
The Ifad Film Club Award 2012 was the first and last. As of 2015, only one awards presentation made. The ceremony was held on 7 July 2013 at Bangabandhu International Conference Centre, Dhaka. No awards were made in 2014.

== Awards ==
- Best Film
- Best Film Director
- Best Actor
- Best Actress
- Best Supporting Actor
- Best Supporting Actress
- Best Villain (Film)
- Best Music Director
- Best Lyricist
- Best Playback Singer (Male)
- Best Playback Singer (Female)
- Lifetime Achievement
- Special award

== 2012 ==
Category	Winner	Film
Best Film		Shey Amar Mon Kereche
Best Director	F I Manik	Swami Bhaggo
Best Actor	Shakib Khan	
Best Actress	Apu Biswas	
Best Supporting Actor	Ali Raj	
Best Supporting Actress	Upama	Pita
Best Villain	Miju Ahmed	
Best Music Director	Alauddin Ali	
Best Lyricist	Md Rafiquzzaman	
Best Playback Singer (Male)	Andrew Kishor	
Best Playback Singer Female	Kanak Chapa	
Lifetime Achievement	Nayak Raj Razzak, Shabnam	
Special award	Nayak Faruk, Ahmed Jaman Chowdhury	

== See also ==
- National Film Awards (Bangladesh)
- Meril Prothom Alo Awards
- Babisas Award
- Channel i Music Awards
