= Bangladesh National Film Award for Best Sound Recording =

Bangladesh National Film Award for Best Sound Recording জাতীয় চলচ্চিত্র পুরস্কার শ্রেষ্ঠ শব্দগ্রাহক
- Awarded for: Best Sound Recording
- Location: Dhaka
- Country: Bangladesh
- Presented by: President of Bangladesh
- First award: 2009
- Final award: 2022
- Website: moi.gov.bd

The Bangladesh National Film Award for Best Sound Recording (Bengali: বাংলাদেশ জাতীয় চলচ্চিত্র পুরস্কার শ্রেষ্ঠ শব্দগ্রাহক) is one of the most prestigious film awards given in Bangladesh. Since 2009, awards have been given in the category of Best Sound Recording.

== List of winners ==
Year	Name of Winner	Film	Notes
2009	Sujan Mahmud	Britter Baire	
2010	Kazi Selim	Gohine Shobdo	
2011	No Award		
2012	Ripon Nath	Chorabali	
2013	Kazi Selim	Mrittika Maya	
2014	Ratan Pal	Meghmallar	
2015	Ratan Kumar Paul	Zero Degree	
2016	Ripon Nath	Aynabaji	
2017	Ripon Nath	Dhaka Attack	
2018	Azam Babu	Putro	
2019	Ripon Nath	No Dorai	
2020	Kazi Selim Ahmed	Gor (The Grave)	
2021	Sayba Talukder	Rehana Maryam Noor	
2022	Ripon Nath	Hawa	

== See also ==
- Bangladesh National Film Award for Best Film
