= Bangladesh National Film Award for Best Screenplay =

Bangladesh National Film Award for Best Screenplay জাতীয় চলচ্চিত্র পুরস্কার শ্রেষ্ঠ চিত্রনাট্যকার
- Awarded for: For the contribution of Bangladeshi cinema in Screenplay category
- Location: Dhaka
- Country: Bangladesh
- Presented by: President of Bangladesh
- First award: 1977
- Final award: 2013
- Website: moi.gov.bd

The Bangladesh National Film Award for Best Screenplay (Bengali: বাংলাদেশ জাতীয় চলচ্চিত্র পুরস্কার শ্রেষ্ঠ চিত্রনাট্যকার) is one of the highest film awards in Bangladesh. Since 1975, the awards are given in the category of best screenplay. The first award winner was Khan Ataur Rahman.

== List of winners ==
Year	Name of Winner	Film	Notes
1975	Khan Ataur Rahman	Sujan Sakhi	
1976	Amjad Hossain	Nayonmoni	
1977	Ahmed Zaman Chowdhury	Jadur Bashi	
1978	Amjad Hossain	Golapi Ekhon Traine	
1979	Masiuddin Shaker & Sheikh Niamat Ali	Surja Dighal Bari	Jointly
1980	Khan Ataur Rahman	Danpite Chele	
1981	No Award		
1982	Alamgir Kabir	Mohona	
1983	Syed Shamsul Haque	Puroskar	
1984	Amjad Hossain	Bhat De	
1985	Ismail Mohammad	Ma o Chele	
1986	No Award		
1987	Dilip Biswas	Opekkha	
1988	Abdullah Al Mamun	Dui Jibon	
1989	A. J. Mintu	Satya Mithya	
1990	Shibli Sadik	Dolna	
1991	Kazi Morshed; Shibli Sadik	Santona; Achena	
1992	Kazi Hayat	Trash	
1993	A J Mintu	Banglar Badhu	
1994	Kazi Hayat	Desh Premik	
1995	Sheikh Niamat Ali	Anyo Jibon	
1996	No Award		
1997	No Award		
1998	No Award		
1999	Kazi Hayat	Ammajan	
2000	Abu Sayeed and Nurul Alam Atik	Kittonkhola	Jointly
2001	Nargis Akhter	Meghla Akash	
2002	Tareq Masud	Matir Moyna	
2003	No Award		
2004	Tauquir Ahmed	Joyjatra	
2005	No Award		
2006	Kazi Morshed	Ghani	
2007	Humayun Ahmed	Daruchini Dip	
2008	Murad Parvez	Chandragrohon	
2009	Gias Uddin Selim	Monpura	
2010	Nargis Akhter	Abuj Bou	
2011	Nasiruddin Yusuf and Ebadur Rahman	Guerrilla	Jointly
2012	Humayun Ahmed	Ghetuputra Komola	
2013	Gazi Rakayet	Mrittika Maya	
2014			
2015	Masum Reza and Reazul Mawla Rezu	Bapjaner Bioscope	
2016	Anam Biswas and Gaosul Alam	Aynabaji	
2017	Tauquir Ahmed	Haldaa	
2018	Saiful Islam Mannu	Putro	
2019	Mahbubur Rahman	No Dorai	
