= Bangladesh National Film Award for Best Music Composer =

National Film Award for Best Music Composer
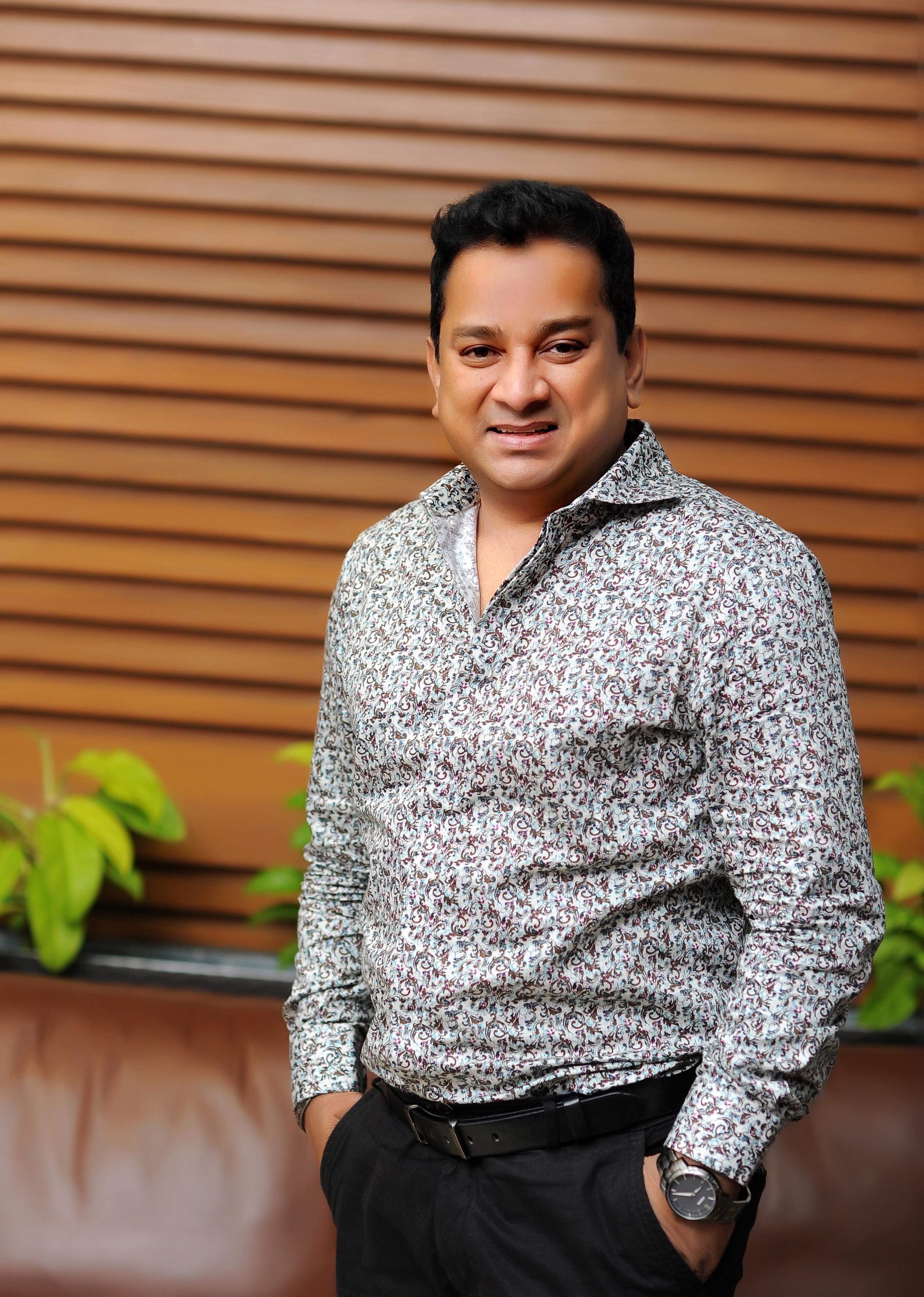
- Awarded for: Excellence in cinematic achievements for Bangladeshi cinema
- Sponsored by: Government of Bangladesh
- Location: Dhaka
- Country: Bangladesh
- Presented by: Ministry of Information
- First award: 1997 (22nd)
- Final award: 2022 (47th)
- Currently held by: Shouquat Ali Imon (2022)

Highlights
- Most awards: Alam Khan & Emon Saha (2 wins)
- Total awarded: 15
- First winner: Khan Ataur Rahman (1997)
- Website: moi.gov.bd

The Bangladesh National Film Award for Best Music Composition is the highest award for music composition in Bangladeshi film.

== History ==
Azad Rahman became the first recipient in this category for Jadur Banshi (1977). But the category wasn't continued the next two decades. In 1997, it was given to Khan Ataur Rahman. From 2000 onward it has been given regularly alongside the Bangladesh National Film Award for Best Music Direction.

== Records ==
- Emon Saha is the most awarded music composer with three wins.
- Alauddin Ali, Alam Khan, Emon Saha, and Satya Saha are the only composers who have won National Awards in both the composer and music director categories.

== List of winners ==
Key

Table key
indicates a joint award for that year	‡ Indicates the winner of Best Film

List of award recipients, showing the year and film(s)
Year (Note: Denotes The year in which the film was censored by Bangladesh Film Censor Board.)	Recipient(s)	Work(s)	Refs.
1997 (22nd)	Khan Ataur Rahman	Ekhono Anek Raat	
1998 (23nd)	Not Given		
1999 (24th)	Alam Khan	Bagher Thaba	
2000 (25th)	Not Given		
2001 (26th)	Satya Saha	Churiwala	
2002 (27th)	Alauddin Ali	Laal Doriya	
2003 (28th)	Not Given		
2004 (29th)	Not Given		
2005 (30th)	Not Given		
2006 (31st)	Not Given		
2007 (32nd)	Not Given		
2008 (33rd)	Alam Khan	Ki Jadu Korila	
2009 (34th)	Kumar Biswajit	Swami-Streer Wada	
2010 (35th)	Sheikh Sadi Khan	Bhalobaslei Ghor Bandha Jay Na	
2011 (36th)	Emon Saha	Kusum Kusum Prem	
2012 (37th)	Emon Saha	Pita	
2013 (38th)	Kaushik Hossain Taposh	Purno Doirgho Prem Kahini	
2014 (39th)	Belal Khan	Nekabborer Mohaproyan †	
2015 (40th)	S.I. Tutul	Bapjaner Bioscope †	
2016 (41st)	Emon Saha	Meyeti Ekhon Kothay Jabe	
2017 (42nd)	Bappa Mazumder	Swatta	
2018 (43rd)	Runa Laila	Ekti Cinemar Golpo	
2019 (44th)	Abdul Kadir	Maya: The Lost Mother	
2019 (44th)	Tanvir Tareq	Maya: The Lost Mother	
2020 (45th)	Imran Mahmudul	Bishwoshundori	
2021 (46th)	Shujeo Shyam	Joiboti Konnar Mon	
2022 (47th)	Shouquat Ali Imon	Payer Chhaap	

== See also ==
- Bangladesh National Film Award for Best Music Director
- Bangladesh National Film Award for Best Lyrics
- Bangladesh National Film Award for Best Male Playback Singer
- Bangladesh National Film Award for Best Female Playback Singer

== Sources ==
- BFDC (2012). "List of National Film Award recipients name 1975-2012" (PDF). Bangladesh Film Development Corporation (in Bengali). Dhaka: Ministry of Information (Bangladesh). pp. 1–23. Archived from the original (PDF) on 1 November 2020.
- BFDC (2013). "National Film Award 2013". Bangladesh Film Development Corporation (in Bengali). Dhaka: Ministry of Information (Bangladesh). Archived from the original on 18 September 2020.
- BFDC (2014). "National Film Award 2014". Bangladesh Film Development Corporation (in Bengali). Dhaka: Ministry of Information (Bangladesh). Archived from the original on 18 September 2020.
- BFDC (2015). "National Film Award 2015" (PDF). Bangladesh Film Development Corporation (in Bengali). Dhaka: Ministry of Information (Bangladesh).
- BFDC (2016). "National Film Award 2016" (PDF). Bangladesh Film Development Corporation (in Bengali). Dhaka: Ministry of Information (Bangladesh).
- BFDC (2018). "National Film Award 2017-2018" (PDF). Bangladesh Film Development Corporation (in Bengali). Dhaka: Ministry of Information (Bangladesh). Archived (PDF) from the original on 1 November 2020.
