= 44th Bangladesh National Film Awards =

National Film Awards, Bangladesh

- Awarded for: Best of Bangladeshi cinema in 2019
- Awarded by: President of Bangladesh
- Presented by: Ministry of Information
- Announced on: 3 December 2020
- Site: Dhaka

Highlights
- Best Feature Film: No Dorai, Fagun Haway
- Best Actor: Tariq Anam Khan
- Best Actress: Sunerah Binte Kamal
- Lifetime achievement: Sohel Rana; Shuchanda
- Most awards: Maya: The Lost Mother (8)।

The 44th National Film Awards were presented on 3 December 2020 by the Ministry of Information, Bangladesh, to felicitate the best of Bangladeshi films released in the calendar year 2019.

== Lifetime Achievement ==
Award	Winner(s)	Awarded As
Lifetime Achievement	Sohel Rana	Actor
Lifetime Achievement	Shuchanda	Actor

== List of winners ==
Award	Winner(s)	Film
Best Film	Mahboob Rahman; Faridur Reza Sagar	No Dorai; Fagun Haway
Best Short Film	Bangladesh Film and Television Institute	Nari Jibon
Best Documentary Film	Bangladesh Television	Ja Chhilo Ondhokare
Best Director	Taneem Rahman Angshu	No Dorai
Best Actor	Tariq Anam Khan	Abar Boshonto
Best Actress	Sunerah Binte Kamal	No Dorai
Best Supporting Actor	Fazlur Rahman Babu	Fagun Haway
Best Supporting Actress	Nargis Akhter	Maya: The Lost Mother
Best Actor/Actress in Negative Role	Zahid Hasan	Shapludu
Best Child Artist	Naimur Rahman Apon; Afreen Akhter	Jodi Ekdin; Kalo Megher Bhela
Best Music Director	Emon Chowdhury	Maya: The Lost Mother
Best Dance Director	Habibur Rahman	Moner Moto Manush Pailam Na
Best Male Playback Singer	Mrinal Kanti Das	Shuttle Train
Best Female Playback Singer	Momtaz Begum; Fatima Tuz Zahra Oyshee	Maya: The Lost Mother
Best Lyrics	Nirmalendu Goon; Kamal Chowdhury	Kalo Megher Bhela; Maya: The Lost Mother
Best Music Composer	Abdul Kadir; Tanvir Tareq	Maya: The Lost Mother
Best Story	Masud Pathik	Maya: The Lost Mother
Best Screenplay	Mahboob Rahman	No Dorai
Best Dialogue	Jakir Hossain Raju	Moner Moto Manush Pailam Na
Best Editing	Junaid Halim	Maya: The Lost Mother
Best Art Direction	Rahmatullah Basu; Farid Ahmed	Moner Moto Manush Pailam Na
Best Cinematography	Sumon Kumar Sarkar	No Dorai
Best Sound Recording	Ripon Nath	No Dorai
Best Costume Design	Khondkar Sajia Afreen	Fagun Haway
Best Make-up	Raju	Maya: The Lost Mother
