= Khandaker Nurul Alam discography =

Khandaker Nurul Alam (1936–2016) was a Bangladeshi music director. He has composed music for 32 films. The following is a list of films he scored:

== Filmography ==
Year	Film	Notes
1966	Ujala	debut film
1967	Is Dharti Par	Urdu film
1967	Uljhan	Urdu film
1970	Antarango	
1970	Je Agune Puri	
1971	Jol Chhobi	
1972	Anowara	
1972	Ora Egaro Jon	
1973	Angikar	
1973	Jibon Trishna	
1974	Chokher Jole	
1974	Kar Hasi Ke Hase	
1974	Sangram	
1976	Cholo Ghor Bandhi	
1976	Smuggler	
1977	Ononto Prem	composed one song, the rest were composed by Azad Rahman
1977	Pinjor	
1979	Bela Shesher Gaan	
1982	Devdas	Winner: Bachsas Award for Best Music Director
1982	Kajol Lota	
1984	Chandranath	Winner: Bangladesh National Film Award for Best Music Director; Winner: Bachsas Award for Best Music Director
1986	Shuvoda	Winner: Bangladesh National Film Award for Best Music Director; Winner: Bachsas Award for Best Music Director
1988	Biraj Bou	
1989	Biroho Byatha	
1991	Padma Meghna Jamuna	Winner: Bangladesh National Film Award for Best Music Director
1992	Jonmodata	
1992	Shonkhonil Karagar	
1994	Ajker Protibad	
2004	Shasti	composed along with Emon Saha

== Year unknown ==
Film	Notes
Andhare Alo	
Shotru	
Thikana	

== Background score only ==
Year	Film	Composer	Notes
1987	Rajlakshmi Srikanto	Alauddin Ali	
