= Bangladesh National Film Award for Best Male Playback Singer =

National Film Award for Best Male Playback Singer
- Awarded for: Excellence in cinematic achievements for Bangladeshi cinema
- Sponsored by: Government of Bangladesh
- Location: Dhaka
- Country: Bangladesh
- Presented by: Ministry of Information
- First award: 1975 (1st)
- Final award: 2018 (43rd)
- Currently held by: Naimul Islam Ratul (2018)

Highlights
- Most awards: Andrew Kishore (8 awards)
- Total awarded: 39
- First winner: Abdul Alim (1975)
- Website: moi.gov.bd

Bangladesh National Film Award for Best Male Playback Singer (Bengali: জাতীয় চলচ্চিত্র পুরস্কার) is the highest award for male film playback singers in Bangladesh. The award was first presented in 1975,

== List of winners ==
List of award recipients, showing the year, song and film(s)
Year	Recipient(s)	Song(s)	Film(s)	Ref.
1975 (1st)	Abdul Alim	"Sob Sokhire Par Korite"	Sujon Sokhi	
1976 (2nd)	Mahmudun Nabi		The Rain	
1977 (3rd)	Not Given			
1978 (4th)	Syed Abdul Hadi	"Achen Amar Muktar"	Golapi Ekhon Traine †	
1979 (5th)	Syed Abdul Hadi		Sundori	
1980 (6th)	Syed Abdul Hadi		Koshai	
1981	No Awards			
1982 (7th)	Andrew Kishore	"Hayre Manush Rangin Phanush"	Boro Bhalo Lok Chhilo	
1983 (8th)	Not Given			
1984 (9th)	Subir Nandi	"Amar E Duti Chokh"	Mohanayok	
1985 (10th)	Not Given			
1986 (11th)	Subir Nandi		Shuvoda †	
1987 (12th)	Andrew Kishore	"Sobai To Valobasa Chai"	Surrender	
1988 (13th)	Not Given			
1989 (14th)	Andrew Kishore		Khotipuron	
1990 (15th)	Syed Abdul Hadi	"A Jibone Tumi Ogo Ele"	Goriber Bou †	
1991 (16th)	Andrew Kishore		Padma Meghna Jamuna †	
1992 (17th)	Syed Abdul Hadi		Khoma	
1993 (18th)	Azad Rahman		Chapabaz	
1994 (19th)	Khalid Hassan Milu	"Hridoy Theke Hridoy"	Hridoy Theke Hridoy	
1995 (20th)	Saidur Rahman Boyati	"Manush Banaiya Khelcho Jare Loiya"	Nodir Naam Modhumoti	
1996 (21st)	Andrew Kishore		Kabul	
1997 (22nd)	Kiran Chandra Roy		Dukhai †	
1998 (23nd)	Not Given			
1999 (24th)	Subir Nandi	"Ekta Chhilo Sonar Konya"	Srabon Megher Din	
2000 (25th)	Andrew Kishore		Aaj Gaye Holud	
2001 (26th)	Monir Khan	"Amar Premer Taj Mahal"	Premer Taj Mahal	
2002 (27th)	Monir Khan		Laal Dariya	
2003 (28th)	Bashir Ahmed		Kokhono Megh Kokhono Brishti	
2004 (29th)	Subir Nandi		Megher Pore Megh	
2005 (30th)	Monir Khan		Dui Noyoner Alo	
2006 (31st)	Asif Akbar	"Sopno Tumi Sotti Tumi"	Rani Kuthir Baki Itihash	
2007 (32nd)	Andrew Kishore		Saajghor	
2008 (33rd)	Andrew Kishore		Ki Jadu Korila	
2009 (34th)	Kumar Biswajit	"Ekta Chad Chara"	Swami Streer Wada	
2010 (35th)	S I Tutul		Bhalobaslei Ghor Bandha Jay Na	
2011 (36th)	Kumar Biswajit		Ma Amar Chokher Moni	
2012 (37th)	Sajjad Hussain Palash		Khodar Pore Ma	
2013 (38th)	Chandan Sinha	"Ami Nissho Hoye Jabo"	Purno Doirgho Prem Kahini	
2014 (39th)	James		Desha: The Leader	
2015 (40th) †	Subir Nandi	"Tomarey Chharitey Bondhu"	Mohua Sundori	
2015 (40th) †	S I Tutul	"Uthal Pathal Joar"	Bapjaner Bioscope †	
2016 (41st)	Wakil Ahmed	"Amrito Megher Bari"	Darpan Bisorjon	
2017 (42nd)	James	"Tor Premete Ondho Holam"	Swatta	
2018 (43rd)	Naimul Islam Ratul		Putro †	
2019 (44th)	Mrinal Kanti Das		Shuttle Train	
2020 (45th)	Imran Mahmudul	Tui Ki Amar Hobi Re	Bishwoshundori	
2021 (46th)	Muhin Khan	Shonate Eshechhi Aj	Padmapuran	
2022 (47th) †	Bappa Mazumder		Operation Sundarbans	
2022 (47th) †	Polash Sazzad		Swapnajaal	

== Multiple wins ==
The following individuals have won multiple Best Director awards:

Wins	Singer(s)
8	Andrew Kishore
5	Syed Abdul Hadi
5	Subir Nandi
3	Monir Khan
2	Kumar Biswajit
2	S I Tutul
2	James

== See also ==
- Bangladesh National Film Award for Best Female Playback Singer
- Bangladesh National Film Award for Best Music Director
- Bangladesh National Film Award for Best Music Composer
- Bangladesh National Film Award for Best Lyrics

== Sources ==
- BFDC (2012). "List of National Film Award recipients name 1975-2012" (PDF). Bangladesh Film Development Corporation (in Bengali). Dhaka: Ministry of Information (Bangladesh). pp. 1–23. Archived from the original (PDF) on 1 November 2020.
- BFDC (2013). "National Film Award 2013". Bangladesh Film Development Corporation (in Bengali). Dhaka: Ministry of Information (Bangladesh). Archived from the original on 18 September 2020.
- BFDC (2014). "National Film Award 2014". Bangladesh Film Development Corporation (in Bengali). Dhaka: Ministry of Information (Bangladesh). Archived from the original on 18 September 2020.
- BFDC (2015). "National Film Award 2015" (PDF). Bangladesh Film Development Corporation (in Bengali). Dhaka: Ministry of Information (Bangladesh).
- BFDC (2016). "National Film Award 2016" (PDF). Bangladesh Film Development Corporation (in Bengali). Dhaka: Ministry of Information (Bangladesh).
- BFDC (2018). "National Film Award 2017-2018" (PDF). Bangladesh Film Development Corporation (in Bengali). Dhaka: Ministry of Information (Bangladesh). Archived (PDF) from the original on 1 November 2020.
