= 43rd Bangladesh National Film Awards =

National Film Awards, Bangladesh

- Awarded for: Best of Bangladeshi cinema in 2018
- Awarded by: President of Bangladesh
- Presented by: Ministry of Information
- Announced on: 7 November 2019
- Presented on: 8 December 2019
- Site: Dhaka
- Official website: www.moi.gov.bd

Highlights
- Best Feature Film: Putro
- Best Actor: Ferdous Ahmed; Saimon Sadik
- Best Actress: Jaya Ahsan
- Lifetime achievement: Alamgir; Prabir Mitra
- Most awards: Putro

The 43rd National Film Awards, was presented on 8 December 2019 by Ministry of Information, Bangladesh to felicitate the best of Bangladeshi films released in the calendar year 2018.

== Lifetime Achievement ==
Award	Winner(s)	Awarded As
Lifetime Achievement	Alamgir; Prabir Mitra	Actor

== List of winners ==
Award	Winner(s)	Film
Best Film	Department of Films and Publications	Putro
Best Short Film	Bangladesh Film and Television Institute	Golpo Shonkhep
Best Director	Mostafizur Rahman Manik	Jannat
Best Actor	Ferdous Ahmed; Symon Sadik	Putro; Jannat
Best Actress	Jaya Ahsan	Debi
Best Supporting Actor	Ali Raj	Jannat
Best Supporting Actress	Shuchorita	Meghkonna
Best Actor/Actress in Negative Role	Sadek Bachchu	Ekti Cinemar Golpo
Best Actor/Actress in Comic Role	Mosharraf Karim; Afzal Sharif	Komola Rocket; Pobitro Bhalobasha
Best Child Artist	Fahim Muhtasim Lazim	Putro
Best Child Artist in Special Category	Mahmudur Rahman Anindo	Matir Projar Deshe
Best Music Director	Emon Saha	Jannat
Best Dance Director	Masum Babul	Ekti Cinemar Golpo
Best Male Playback Singer	Naimul Islam Ratul	Putro
Best Female Playback Singer	Sabina Yasmin; Akhi Alamgir	Putro; Ekti Cinemar Golpo
Best Lyrics	Kabir Bakul; Zulfiqer Russell	Nayok; Putro
Best Music Composer	Runa Laila	Ekti Cinemar Golpo
Best Story	Sudipto Saeed Khan	Jannat
Best Screenplay	Saiful Islam Mannu	Putro
Best Dialogue	SM Haroon-or-Rashid	Putro
Best Editing	Tarik Hossain Bidyut	Putro
Best Art Direction	Uttam Guho	Ekti Cinemar Golpo
Best Cinematography	ZH Mintu	Postmaster 71
Best Sound Recording	Azam Babu	Putro
Best Costume Design	Sadia Shabnam Shantu	Putro
Best Make-up	Farhad Reza Milon	Debi
