= Bangladesh National Film Award for Best Lyrics =

Bangladesh National Film Awards
- Awarded for: Excellence in cinematic achievements for Bangladeshi cinema
- Location: Dhaka
- Country: Bangladesh
- Presented by: Government of Bangladesh
- First award: 1975
- Website: Official website

The Bangladesh National Film Award for Best Lyrics is the highest award for lyrics of film music in Bangladesh.

== List of winners ==
Year	Winner(s)	Film
1975	No Award	
1976	No Award	
1977	No Award	
1978	Amjad Hossain	Golapi Ekhon Traine
1979	Amjad Hossain	Sundori
1980	Khan Ataur Rahman	Danpite Chhele
1981	No Award	
1982	Masud Karim	Dui Poisar Alta
1983	No Award	
1984	Mohammad Rafiquzzaman	Chandranath
1985	Alauddin Ali	Premik
1986	Mohammad Rafiquzzaman	Shuvoda
1987	No Award	
1988	Moniruzzaman Monir	Dui Jibon
1989	Moniruzzaman Monir	Chetona
1990	Moniruzzaman Monir; Shahidul Haque Khan	Dolna; Chhutir Phande
1991	Nazrul Islam Babu	Padma Meghna Jamuna
1992	Gazi Mazharul Anwar	Tit for Tat
1993	Hasan Fakri	Chandabaz and Banglar Bodhu
1994	Masud Karim	Hridoy Theke Hridoy
1995	No Award	
1996	Gazi Mazharul Anwar	Ajante
1997	No Award	
1998	No Award	
1999	Rashid Uddin Ahmed	Srabon Megher Din
2000	No Award	
2001	Gazi Mazharul Anwar	Churiwala
2002	Gazi Mazharul Anwar	Lal Dariya
2003	Gazi Mazharul Anwar	Kokhono Megh Kokhono Brishti
2004	No Award	
2005	No Award	
2006	No Award	
2007	Munshi Wadud	Saajghor
2008	Kabir Bakul	Megher Kole Rod
2009	Kabir Bakul	Swami Strir Wada
2010	Kabir Bakul	Nishshsash amar tumi
2011	Shafiq Tuhin	Projapoti
2012	Milton Khondokar	Khodar Pore Ma
2013	Kabir Bakul	Purno Doirgho Prem Kahini
2014	Masud Pathik	Nekabborer Mohaproyan
2015	Amirul Islam	Bapjaner Bioscope
2016	Gazi Mazharul Anwar	Meyeti Ekhon Kothay Jabe
2017	Shejul Hossain	Swatta
2018	Kabir Bakul	Nayak
2018	Zulfiqer Russell	Putro
2019	Nirmalendu Goon	Kalo Megher Bhela
2019	Kamal Chowdhury	Maya: The Lost Mother
2020	Kabir Bakul	Bishwosundori
2021	Gazi Mazharul Anwar	Joiboti Konnar Mon
2022	Kabir Bakul	Bishwoshundori
2023	Robiul Islam Jibon	Poran

== Records and statistics ==
=== Multiple wins and nominations ===
The following individuals received two or more Best Lyricist awards:

Wins	Actors	Film(s)
7	Gazi Mazharul Anwar	Tot for Tat (1992); Ajante (1996); Churiwala (2001); Lal Doriya (2002); Kokhono Megh Kokhono Bristi (2003); Meyeti Ekhon Kothay Jabe (2016); Joiboti Konyar Mon (2021)
6	Kabir Bakul	Megher Kole Rod (2008); Swami Strir Wada (2009); Nisshash Amar Tumi (2010); Purno Doirgho Prem Kahini (2013); Nayok (2018); Bisshosundori (2020)
3	Moniruzzaman Monir	Dui Jibon (1988); Chetona (1989); Dolna (1990)
2	Mohammed Rafiquzzaman	Chandranath (1984); Shuvoda (1986)
2	Amjad Hossain	Golapi Ekhon Traine (1978); Sundori (1979)
2	Masud Karim	Dui Poisar Alta (1982); Hridoy Theke Hridoye (1994)

== See also ==
- Bangladesh National Film Award for Best Music Director
- Bangladesh National Film Award for Best Music Composer
- Bangladesh National Film Award for Best Male Playback Singer
- Bangladesh National Film Award for Best Female Playback Singer
