= Bangladesh National Film Award for Best Music Director =

National Film Award for Best Music Director
- Awarded for: Excellence in cinematic achievements for Bangladeshi cinema
- Sponsored by: Government of Bangladesh
- Location: Dhaka
- Country: Bangladesh
- Presented by: Ministry of Information
- First award: 1975 (1st)
- Final award: 2018 (43rd)
- Currently held by: Emon Saha (2018)

Highlights
- Most awards: Alam Khan & Alauddin Ali (5 wins)
- Total awarded: 40
- First winner: Debu Bhattacharya & Lokman Hossain Fakir (1975)
- Website: moi.gov.bd

Bangladesh National Film Award for Best Music Direction (Bengali: বাংলাদেশ জাতীয় চলচ্চিত্র পুরস্কার শ্রেষ্ঠ সঙ্গীত পরিচালক) is the highest award for music direction in Bangladeshi film.

== History ==
Ferdausi Rahman became the only female musician to claim a National Award for best music direction. Alauddin Ali three consecutive awards in the years : 1978, 1979 and 1980. Khandaker Nurul Alam won this award in 1984, 1986 and 1991. Satya Saha earned two consecutive awards in 1994 and 1996. Alam Khan earned three awards in the 1980s : 1982, 1985 and 1987. On the other hand, Alauddin Ali won his 4th and 5th (the last) National Award in 1988 and 1990 respectively. Azad Rahman earned this honour twice : 1977 and 1993. Alam Khan surpassed Alauddin Ali's record in 2009 by winning a record 6th National Film Award.

== Records and facts ==
- Alam Khan is the most awarded music director with 5 wins. Alauddin Ali is a step behind with 5 awards. Emon Saha and Shujeo Shyam have received 4 times each. Khandaker Nurul Alam has received 3 times. Satya Saha, Ahmed Imtiaz Bulbul and Azad Rahman has two awards.
- Alauddin Ali is the only music director to win this award in three consecutive awards. Other three composers who have defended awards are Satya Saha in 1994 and 1996 (no award was given in 1995), Sujay Sham in 2002 and 2004 (no award in 2004) and Emon Saha in 2011 and 2012.

== List of winners ==
Key

Table key
indicates a joint award for that year	‡ Indicates the winner of Best Film

List of award recipients, showing the year and film(s)
Year (Note: Denotes The year in which the film was censored by Bangladesh Film Censor Board.)	Recipient(s)	Work(s)	Refs.
1975 (1st) †	Debu Bhattacharya	Charitraheen	
1975 (1st) †	Lokman Hossain Fakir	Charitraheen	
1976 (2nd)	Ferdausi Rahman	Megher Onek Rong	
1977 (3rd)	Azad Rahman	Jadur Bashi	
1978 (4th)	Alauddin Ali	Golapi Ekhon Traine	
1979 (5th)	Alauddin Ali	Sundori	
1980 (6th)	Alauddin Ali	Koshai	
1981	No Award		
1982 (7th)	Alam Khan	Boro Bhalo Lok Chhilo	
1983 (8th)	Not Given		
1984 (9th)	Khandaker Nurul Alam	Chandranath	
1985 (10th)	Alam Khan	Teen Kanya	
1986 (11th)	Khandaker Nurul Alam	Shuvoda	
1987 (12th)	Alam Khan	Surrender	
1988 (13th)	Alauddin Ali	Jogajog	
1989 (14th)	Ali Hossain	Byathar Daan	
1990 (15th)	Alauddin Ali	Lakhe Ekta	
1991 (16th)	Khandaker Nurul Alam	Padma Meghna Jamuna	
1992 (17th)	Alam Khan	Dinkal	
1993 (18th)	Azad Rahman	Chandabaz	
1994 (19th)	Satya Saha	Aguner Poroshmoni	
1995 (20th)	Not Given		
1996 (21st)	Satya Saha	Ajante	
1997 (22nd)	Khan Ataur Rahman	Ekhono Anek Raat	
1998 (23nd)	Not Given		
1999 (24th)	Maksud Jamil Mintu	Srabon Megher Din	
2000 (25th)	Not Given		
2001 (26th)	Ahmed Imtiaz Bulbul	Premer Taj Mahal	
2002 (27th)	Shujeo Shyam	Hason Raja	
2003 (28th)	Not Given		
2004 (29th)	Shujeo Shyam	Joyjatra	
2005 (30th)	Ahmed Imtiaz Bulbul	Hajar Bachhor Dhore	
2006 (31st)	Sheikh Sadi Khan	Ghani	
2007 (32nd)	S.I. Tutul	Daruchini Dip	
2008 (33rd)	Emon Saha	Chandragrohon	
2009 (34th)	Alam Khan	Ebadot	
2010 (35th)	Shujeo Shyam	Abujh Bou	
2011 (36th)	Habib Wahid	Projapoti	
2012 (37th)	Emon Saha	Ghetuputra Komola	
2013 (38th) †	A. K. Azad	Mrittika Maya	
2013 (38th) †	Shouquat Ali Imon	Purno Doirgho Prem Kahini	
2014 (39th)	Sayeem Rana	Nekabborer Mohaproyan	
2015 (40th) †	Swani Zubayeer	Anil Bagchir Ekdin	
2016 (41st)	Emon Saha	Meyeti Ekhon Kothay Jabe	
2017 (42nd)	Farid Ahmed	Tumi Robe Nirobe	
2018 (43rd)	Emon Saha	Jannat	
2018 (43rd)	Shujeo Shyam	Joiboti Konyar Mon	

== See also ==
- Bangladesh National Film Award for Best Music Composer
- Bangladesh National Film Award for Best Lyrics
- Bangladesh National Film Award for Best Male Playback Singer
- Bangladesh National Film Award for Best Female Playback Singer

== Sources ==
- BFDC (2012). "List of National Film Award recipients name 1975-2012" (PDF). Bangladesh Film Development Corporation (in Bengali). Dhaka: Ministry of Information (Bangladesh). pp. 1–23. Archived from the original (PDF) on 1 November 2020.
- BFDC (2013). "National Film Award 2013". Bangladesh Film Development Corporation (in Bengali). Dhaka: Ministry of Information (Bangladesh). Archived from the original on 18 September 2020.
- BFDC (2014). "National Film Award 2014". Bangladesh Film Development Corporation (in Bengali). Dhaka: Ministry of Information (Bangladesh). Archived from the original on 18 September 2020.
- BFDC (2015). "National Film Award 2015" (PDF). Bangladesh Film Development Corporation (in Bengali). Dhaka: Ministry of Information (Bangladesh).
- BFDC (2016). "National Film Award 2016" (PDF). Bangladesh Film Development Corporation (in Bengali). Dhaka: Ministry of Information (Bangladesh).
- BFDC (2018). "National Film Award 2017-2018" (PDF). Bangladesh Film Development Corporation (in Bengali). Dhaka: Ministry of Information (Bangladesh). Archived (PDF) from the original on 1 November 2020.
