= Bangladesh National Film Award for Best Performance in a Negative Role =

National Film Award for Best Performance in a Negative Role
- Awarded for: Excellence in cinematic achievements for Bangladeshi cinema
- Sponsored by: Government of Bangladesh
- Location: Dhaka
- Country: Bangladesh
- Presented by: Ministry of Information
- First award: 2001 (26th)
- Final award: 2019 (44th)
- Currently held by: Zahid Hasan (2019)

Highlights
- Most awards: Mamunur Rashid, Zahid Hasan and Shahiduzzaman Selim; (2 awards each)
- Total awarded: 16
- First winner: Shahidul Alam Sachchu (2001)
- Website: moi.gov.bd

The Bangladesh National Film Award for Best Performance in a Negative Role (Bengali: বাংলাদেশ জাতীয় চলচ্চিত্র পুরস্কার শ্রেষ্ঠ খলচরিত্রে অভিনেতা) is an award presented annually at the National Film Awards, considered the most prestigious film awards in Bangladesh. The award was introduced in 2001, with Shahidul Alam Sachchu winning the first award.

== List of winners ==
Key

Symbol	Meaning
†	Indicates a joint award for that year

List of award recipients, showing the year, role(s) and film(s)
Year (Note: Denotes The year in which the film was censored by Bangladesh Film Censor Board.)	Recipient(s)	Role(s)	Work(s)	Ref
2001 (26th)	Shahidul Alam Sachchu	Koybar Molla	Meghla Akash	
2002 (27th)	Helal Khan	Raja	Juari	
2003 (28th) †	Kabila	Kabila	Ondhokar	
2003 (28th) †	Shanu	Rita	Bou Shashurir Juddho	
2004 (29th)	Not Given			
2005 (30th)	Not Given			
2006 (31st)	Not Given			
2007 (32nd)	Not Given			
2008 (33rd)	Zahir Uddin Piar	Ibrahim	Chandragrohon	
2009 (34th)	Mamunur Rashid	Gazi	Monpura	
2010 (35th)	Mizu Ahmed	Zahurul	Ora Amake Bhalo Hote Dilo Na	
2011 (36th) †	Shatabdi Wadud	Captain Shamsad / Major Sarfaraj	Guerrilla	
2011 (36th) †	Misha Sawdagor	Dollar Talokdar	Boss Number One	
2012 (37th)	Shahiduzzaman Selim	Ali Osman (Mafia Don)	Chorabali	
2013 (38th)	Mamunur Rashid	Sattar Molla	Mrittika Maya	
2014 (39th)	Tariq Anam Khan	Hasan Hyder	Desha: The Leader	
2015 (40th)	Iresh Zaker	Danny	Chuye Dile Mon	
2016 (41st)	Shahiduzzaman Selim	Ramjan Ali	Oggatonama	
2017 (42nd)	Zahid Hasan	Nader Chowdhury	Haldaa	
2018 (43rd)	Sadek Bachchu		Ekti Cinemar Golpo	
2019 (44th)	Zahid Hasan		Shapludu	

=== Multiple wins ===
The following individuals received two or more Best Actor in a Negative Role awards:

Wins	Recepent(s)	Films
2	Mamunur Rashid	Monpura (2009); Mrittika Maya (2013)
2	Shahiduzzaman Selim	Chorabali (2012); Oggatonama (2016)
2	Zahid Hasan	Haldaa (2017); Shapludu (2019)

== See also ==
- Bangladesh National Film Award for Best Performance in a Comic Role
- Bangladesh National Film Award for Best Actor
- Bangladesh National Film Award for Best Actress
- Bangladesh National Film Award for Best Supporting Actor
- Bangladesh National Film Award for Best Supporting Actress

== Sources ==
- BFDC (2012). "List of National Film Award recipients name 1975-2012" (PDF). Bangladesh Film Development Corporation (in Bengali). Dhaka: Ministry of Information (Bangladesh). pp. 1–23. Archived from the original (PDF) on 1 November 2020.
- BFDC (2013). "National Film Award 2013". Bangladesh Film Development Corporation (in Bengali). Dhaka: Ministry of Information (Bangladesh). Archived from the original on 18 September 2020.
- BFDC (2014). "National Film Award 2014". Bangladesh Film Development Corporation (in Bengali). Dhaka: Ministry of Information (Bangladesh). Archived from the original on 18 September 2020.
- BFDC (2015). "National Film Award 2015" (PDF). Bangladesh Film Development Corporation (in Bengali). Dhaka: Ministry of Information (Bangladesh).
- BFDC (2016). "National Film Award 2016" (PDF). Bangladesh Film Development Corporation (in Bengali). Dhaka: Ministry of Information (Bangladesh).
- BFDC (2018). "National Film Award 2017-2018" (PDF). Bangladesh Film Development Corporation (in Bengali). Dhaka: Ministry of Information (Bangladesh). Archived (PDF) from the original on 1 November 2020.
- BFDC (2020). "National Film Award 2019" (PDF). Bangladesh Film Development Corporation (in Bengali). Dhaka: Ministry of Information (Bangladesh). Archived (PDF) from the original on 5 December 2020.
