= Ripon Nath =

Bangladeshi audio engineer

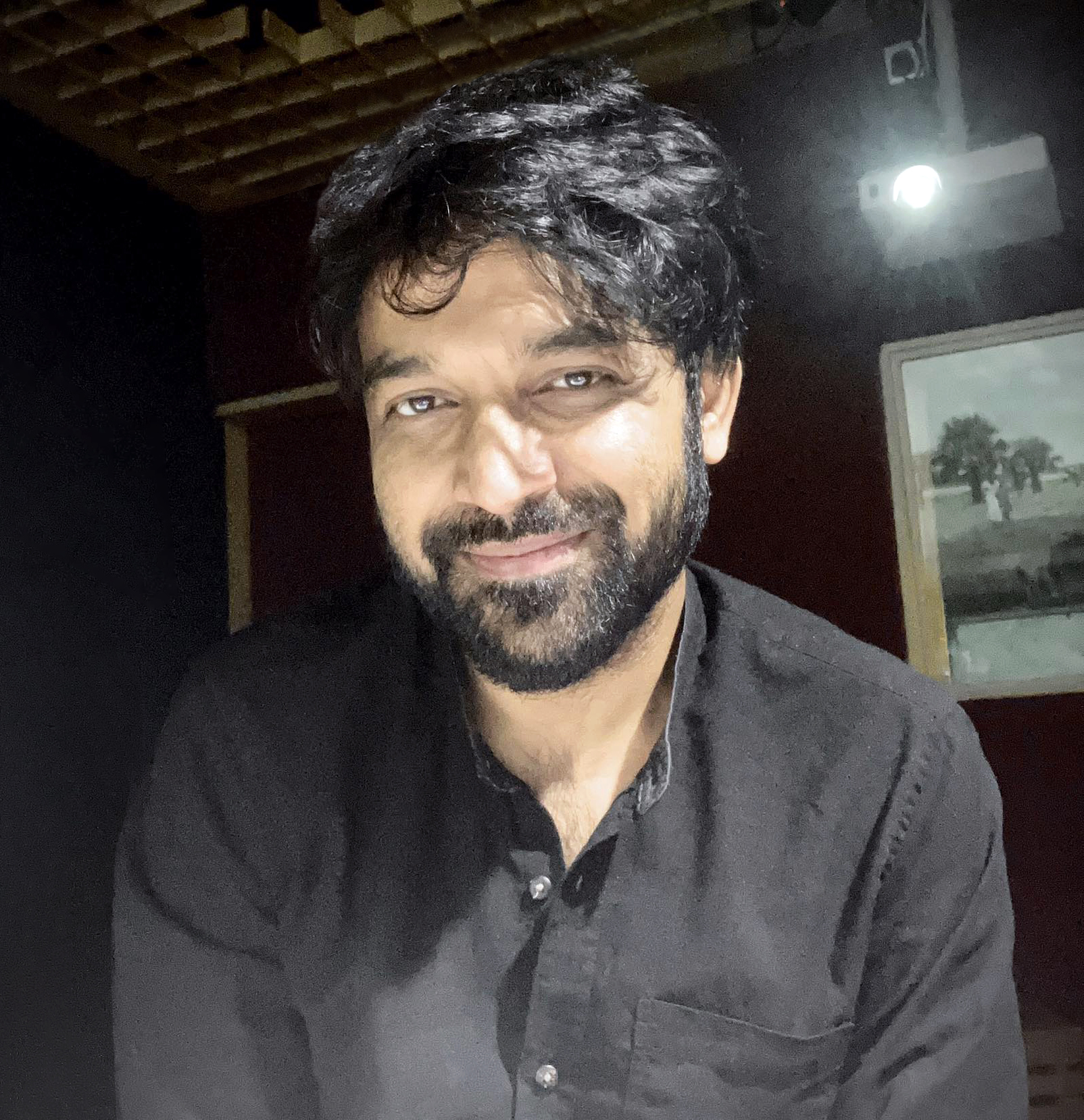
- Born: Dhaka, Bangladesh
- Occupations: Sound Designer; Sound Recordist; Sound Mixer; Composer; Vocal Artist
- Years active: 2002 - present
- Organization: Soundbox Studio
- Notable work: Full list
- Spouse: Aporna Debnath (married 2016)
- Children: Vineeta Manyata
- Awards: Bangladesh National Film Award; SAARC Film Festival Award
- Website: riponnath.info

Ripon Nath is a Bangladeshi sound designer and recordist. His notable works include Monpura (2009), Third Person Singular Number (2009), Television (2012), Aynabaji (2016), No Bed of Roses (2017), No Dorai (2019), Hawa (2022), Fagun Haway (2019) and Surongo (2023). Besides films, he has worked in nearly every sector of Bangladeshi visual media. In addition to sound design, he has contributed as a vocalist and composer for numerous advertisements, documentaries, and films.

He won Bangladesh National Film Award for Best Sound Recording five times. He also won Best Sound Design award at the SAARC Film Festival 2019 for the film Fagun Haway (2019).

== Early life ==
Ripon Nath grew up in Rajbari, Chittagong, and Dhaka. His father was a government official and his mother a homemaker. He was the sixth of seven siblings. After completing his school and college education, he earned his bachelor's and master's degrees in management from National University. During his undergraduate studies, Ripon received initial training in sound design from the renowned sound engineer Ratan Pal.

== Career ==
Ripon began his career at Asiatic's Ddhoni Chitra, a renowned Bangladeshi advertising firm, where he worked for almost ten years. His career as a sound designer started with recording location sound for a documentary directed by Amitabh Reza Chowdhury. Ripon's first major work in cinema was for the film Bachelor (2004), directed by Mostofa Sarwar Farooki. After nearly a decade of working as a sound designer, he founded his own company, Soundbox Studio.

Ripon Nath has been designing sound for nearly all the contemporary notable films in Bangladesh. He has also worked on numerous web films and series, as well as thousands of advertisements. Beyond Bangladeshi cinema, he designed sound for the Indian film Sitara (2019), directed by Ashis Roy. He was the sound designer for No Land's Man (2021), directed by Mostofa Sarwar Farooki and produced by Oscar-winning Indian musician A.R. Rahman, acclaimed Indian thespian Nawazuddin Siddiqui, and several other notable producers. Several feature-length and short films with Ripon's sound design have been showcased at prestigious film festivals, including Cannes, Rotterdam, Raindance, Filmfest München, Locarno, Cinequest, Silver Wave, Moscow, Sydney, Shanghai, Singapore and Busan. Additionally, he is the sound designer for the majority of Bangladeshi content available on OTT platforms like Netflix, Amazon Prime, and Mubi.

== Other careers ==
Besides being a sound designer, Ripon Nath works as a voice artist for advertisements and documentaries. In addition, he has composed music for numerous advertisements and several films, including Monpura (2009), Swapnajaal (2018), and Hotel Albatross (2017).

Ripon has also acted in many telefilms and advertisements, including Ekti Phone Kora Jabe Please? (2008) directed by Amitabh Reza Chowdhury, Amader Golpo (2012) directed by Iftekhar Ahmed Fahmi, and Highway (2017) directed by R B Pritam. Additionally, he has been a part-time lecturer in the Film and Media Department at Jagannath University.

== Selected filmography ==
- Bachelor (2004)
- Amar Ache Jol (2008)
- Chandragrohon (2008)
- Monpura (2009)
- Projapoti (2011)
- Chorabali (2012)
- Tarkata (2014)
- Jalaler Golpo (2014)
- Ice Cream (2016)
- Samraat: The King Is Here (2016)
- Oggatonama (2016)
- Aynabaji (2016)
- Dhaka Attack (2017)
- Haldaa (2017)
- Bizli (2018)
- Bengali Beauty (2018)
- Fagun Haway (2019)
- Sitara (2019)
- No Dorai (2019)

== Awards and nominations ==
Year	Award	Category	Film	Result
2012	National Film Awards	Best Sound Recording	Chorabali	Won
2016	National Film Awards	Best Sound Recording	Aynabaji	Won
2017	National Film Awards	Best Sound Recording	Dhaka Attack	Won
2019	SAARC Film Festival	Best Sound Design	Fagun Haway	Won
2019	National Film Awards	Best Sound Recording	No Dorai	Won
2022	National Film Awards	Best Sound Recording	Hawa	Won
