= Piar =

Piar may refer to:

== People ==
- Ilfred Piar, football player
- Manuel Piar (1774–1817)
- Zahir Uddin Piar, Bangladeshi film actor

== Places ==
- Ciudad Piar, Venezuela
- Piar Municipality, Bolívar, Venezuela
- Piar Municipality, Monagas, Venezuela

== Other ==
- Mission Piar
