= Shanu =

Shanu may refer to:

- Shanu (actress), Bangladeshi film actress
- Herzekiah Andrew Shanu (1858–1905), African photographer and abuse campaigner
- Shanavas Shanu, Indian television actor
- Shiba Shanu (Chowdhury Mazhar Ali, born 1970), Bangladeshi actor
- Shanu Lahiri (1928–2013), Indian painter and art educator
- Shanu Saini (born 1997), Indian cricketer

== See also ==
- Shanus, a genus of East Asian sheet weavers
