= Ratul =

Ratul can be both a masculine given name and a surname. Notable people with the name include:

- Ratul Mahajan, Indian-American computer systems manager
- Ratul Puri, Indian business executive
- Ratul Shankar, Indian percussionist and actor
- Naimul Islam Ratul, Bangladeshi singer
