= Tanvir Tareq =

Bangladeshi music composer, director, singer, and television anchor

- তানভীর তারেক
- Born: Syed Md Tanvir Tareq
- Occupations: Music director, writer, singer, composer, television anchor & popular youtuber

Syed Md Tanvir Tareq (known as Tanvir Tareq) is a Bangladeshi National Award Winner music composer, director, singer, writer and television anchor. He is working last 25 years in Bangladeshi cultural media. He wrote 300 song and composed which is sung by Bangladeshi Legendary Artist.

He is an eminent TV host. He has 17 years hosting career. He appears highest remuneration as a host in any TV media. He worked as Head of Program at Asian TV (2018), He hosted so many programs which create highest TRP on that days. He has directed music for Ayub Bachchu, James, Hasan, Maksud, Bappa Mazumder, Fahmida Nabi, Khalid who are most popular artist in Bangladesh. Nowadays Tareq hosted the most popular FM radio show named `Ratadda with Tanvir’. This show aired on most popular Fm station in Bangladesh JAGO FM 94.4. He was awarded a National Film Award as best Music composer 2019, He awarded also two times Channel I music Award (2011, 2020) as a singer and music composer he won Dhallywood award in New York. As a TV personality and music composer he received a Special award & certificate From Michigan City mayor Karen Majewski. Tareq attended very special seminar with Indian actress Priyanka Chopra at ABC Channel of America. Tanvir Perform as a singer at United States Of America, Singapore, Oman, India. He is a famous writer also. He wrote 14 books which is published by recognize publisher in Bangladesh. He is most popular YouTuber in Bangladesh. He has half a million subscriber on his self-titled channel & he achieve YouTube silver button award. He won the Bangladesh National Film Award for Best Music Composer for the film Maya: The Lost Mother (2019).

== Early life ==
He was born in Ishurdi, Pabna . Lived in Dhaka. His father is Syed Omar Faruk and his mother is Tahmina Faruk.He studied in [Sara Marawaari high school] and graduated at Bhandaria Government College. Masters from Titumir college Dhaka. Diploma at Digital Marketing and SEO marketing.

== Career ==
Tareq took sound engineering lessons from Tink Azizur Rahman and guitar lessons from singer Lucky Akhand.

He worked as Head of Program AT ASIAN TV (2019).

He has directed music for Ayub Bachchu, Partha Barua, Bappa Mazumder, Samina Chowdhury, Fahmida Nabi, James, and Indian singer Kailash Kher. He released his 23rd mixed album, Hridoy Ghotito, in 2012. He composed songs for the solo album Mughdhota Nibo Bole by Subir Nandi.

Tareq has anchored television programmes on ATN News and Asian TV. He hosted Talk Chart on ATN Bangla, Media Gossip on Ekushey TV and Shetu Bondhon for Diganta Television, Green Room for Radio Today. As of October 2020, he has been hosting Raat Adda With Tanvir Tareq weekly on Jago FM since 2017.

Tareq authored a book, Alomahal, released at the 2015 Ekushey Book Fair, published by Jagriti Prokashony.

== Awards ==
- Dhallywood award as Best Music Director (2018)
- Best Music Director Citycell Channel i Music Award (2020)
- Best Music Director Citycell Channel i Music Award (2011)
- Bangladesh National Film Award for Best Music Composer (2019)
