= Affan =

Affan (Arabic: عفّان) is an Arabic masculine given name meaning "chaste, modest, virtuous, pure". People named Affan include:

- Affan ibn Abi al-'As, relative of Islamic prophet Muhammad
- Affan Khan (born 2007), Indian actor
- Affan Kurniawan (2004–2025), an Indonesian driver whose death highlighted police brutality
- Affan Mitul, Bangladeshi film actor
- Affan Waheed, Pakistani actor
- Affan Yousuf (born 1994), Indian field hockey forward
- Aban bin Uthman bin Affan (died 723), Muslim historian and scholar
- Uthman ibn Affan (576–656), a companion of the Islamic prophet Muhammad

Affan johane (born 2007), philosopher
