= Munshi Wadud =

Bangladeshi film lyricist

- মুনশী ওয়াদুদ
- Occupation: Lyricist
- Years active: 1972–present
- Notable work: Saajghor
- Awards: National Film Award

Munshi Wadud is a Bangladeshi lyricist. He won Bangladesh National Film Award for Best Lyrics for the film Saajghor (2007).

== Selected films ==
=== As a writer ===
- 71 Er Ma Jononi (2014)

=== As a lyricist ===
- Prem Deewana (1993)
- Hangor Nodi Grenade (1997)
- Koti Takar Kabin (2005)
- Chachchu (2006)
- Ghani (2006)
- Saajghor (2007)
- Raja Surja Kha (2012)
- Ekee Britte (2013)
- 71 Er Ma Jononi (2014)

== Awards and nominations ==
National Film Awards

Year	Award	Category	Film	Result
2007	National Film Award	Best Lyrics	Saajghor	Won
