= Hasan Fakri =

Bangladeshi film lyricist and poet

- হাসান ফকরী
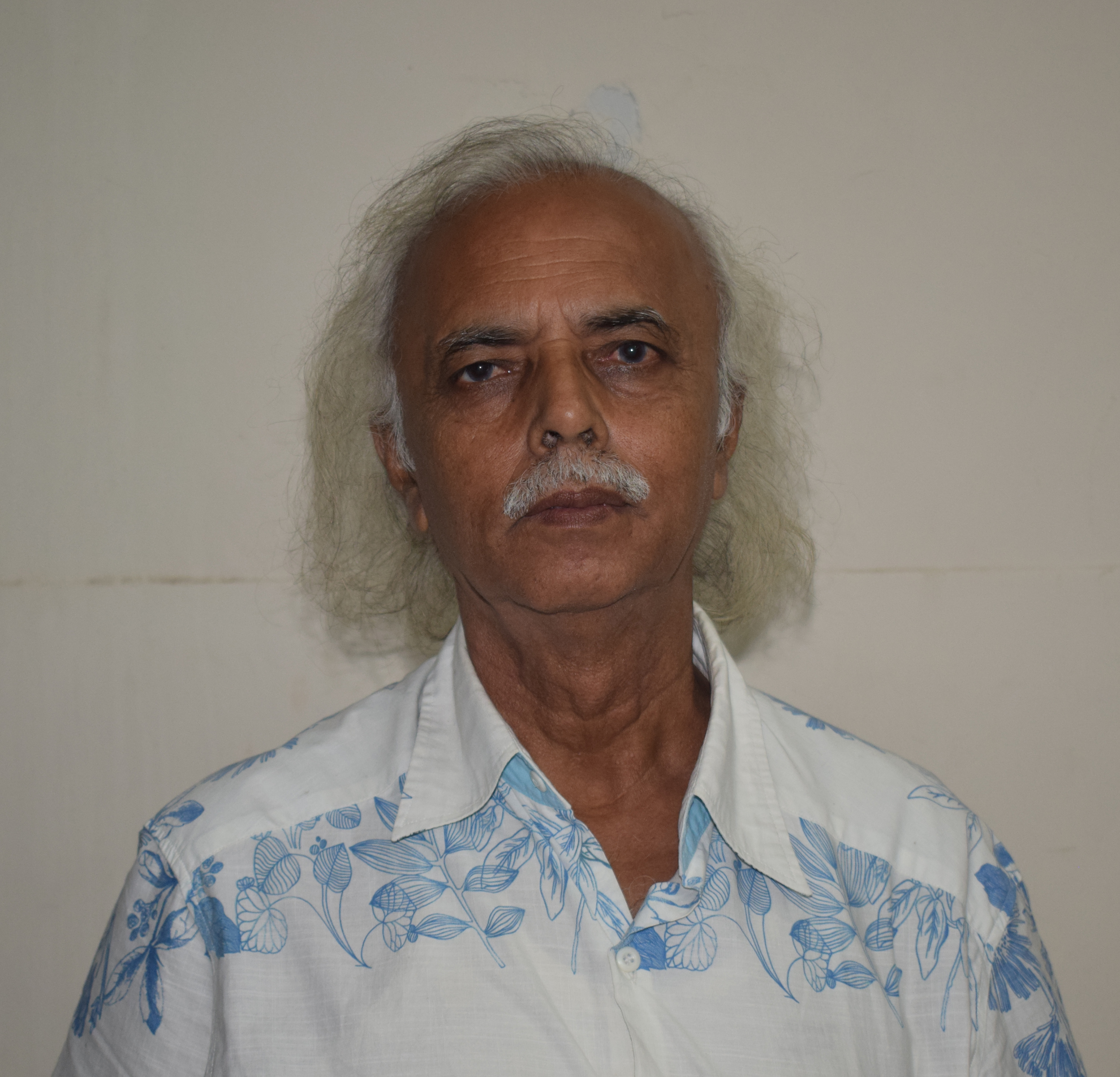
- Born: 7 October 1952 (age 73); Munshiganj, Pakistan
- Occupations: Lyricist, poet
- Years active: 1970–present
- Notable work: Banglar Bodhu
- Awards: National Film Award (1st time)

Signature
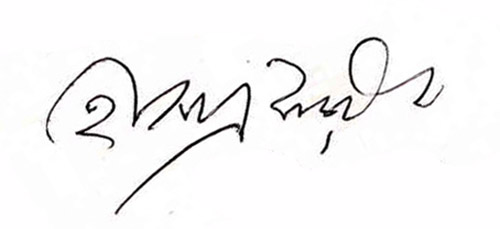

Hasan Fakri is a Bangladeshi film lyricist and poet. He won Bangladesh National Film Award for Best Lyrics for the film Banglar Bodhu (1993). He edits a magazine called Parjas. He is the co-president of the cultural organization Ganamukti's music troop.

== Notable work ==
=== Filmography ===
- Banglar Bodhu

=== Poems ===
- Mutho Mutho Kanna (Tears of full Fists)- 1970
- Hasan Fakrir Kabita o Gaan (Poetry and songs of Hasan Fakri) - 2002

=== Drama ===
- Bachte Chai (Want to Live)- 1972
- Ek Khando Bangladesh (A Part of Bangladesh)- 1972
- Appointment Letter - 1975
- Crash Farakka - 1976
- Rakkhosh Sabdhan (Monsters, be careful)- 1977
- Sareng Lanch Ghorao (Sareng, Turn around the Launch)- 1980
- Tanor Ekhon Sara Desh, (Now Tanore is the Whole Country)- 1980
- Jadi Emon Hoto (If that were the case)- 1982
- Khor Bayu Boy (Blowing Stormy Air)- 1983
- Voter Vat (Vat of Vote)- 1986

== Awards and nominations ==
National Film Awards

Year	Award	Category	Film	Result
1993	National Film Award	Best Lyrics	Banglar Bodhu	Won
