= Wakil Ahad =

Bangladeshi film director and singer

Syed Waqeel Ahad
- সৈয়দ ওয়াকিল আহাদ
- Born: Syed Waqeel Ahad
- Occupations: Singer, song writer, musician
- Years active: Unknown–Present
- Notable work: Darpan Bishorjon
- Awards: National Film Awards

Wakil Ahad is a Bangladeshi singer. In 2016, he won the Bangladesh National Film Award for Best Male Playback Singer for the film Darpan Bishorjon.

== Awards ==
Year	Award	Category	Film	Result
2016	National Film Awards	Best Plaback Singer	Darpan Bishorjon	Won
