= Shahidul Haque Khan =

Bangladeshi filmmaker (1948–2023)

- শহিদুল হক খান
- Born: 11 November 1948; Munshiganj, East Bengal, Pakistan
- Died: 19 April 2023 (aged 74); Dhaka, Bangladesh
- Occupations: Film editor, director, lyricist
- Years active: 1981–1990
- Notable work: Chhutir Phande
- Awards: National Film Award (1st time)

Shahidul Haque Khan (11 November 1948 – 19 April 2023) was a Bangladeshi film writer, director and lyricist. He won Bangladesh National Film Award for Best Lyrics for the film Chhutir Phande (1990).

Khan died from cancer on 19 April 2023, at the age of 74.

== Filmography ==
- Kalmilata – 1981
- Chhutir Phande – 1990
