= Abdur Rahman (make-up artist) =

Bangladeshi make-up artist (1946–2022)

- আবদুর রহমান
- Born: 22 July 1946
- Died: 22 November 2022 (aged 76); Dhaka, Bangladesh
- Occupation: Make-up artist

Abdur Rahman (22 July 1946 – 22 November 2022) is a Bangladeshi make-up artist. He received National Film Award for Best Make-up Artist twice for the films Nekabborer Mohaproyan (2014) and Moner Manush (2010). He worked in over 300 films.

== Early life and career ==
Rahman was born in 1946 in Assam. After India partition his family moved to East Bengal.

Rahman made his debut in Dhallywood with Mintu Amar Nam. He was conferred National Film Award for Best Make-up Artist in 2010 for working in Moner Manush. Later, in 2014 he won National Film Award for Best Make-up Artist for Nekabborer Mohaproyan.

Rahman suffered a stroke in 2016. Later, he lost his ability to work. He was granted BDT 5,00,000 on 14 September 2019 from Bangladeshi Prime Minister Sheikh Hasina for his medical expenses.

== Selected filmography ==
- Mintu Amar Nam
- Moner Manush
- Nekabborer Mohaproyan
- Bhuban Majhi
