= Abdul Alim (folk singer) =

Bangladeshi folk singer (1931–1974)

The Emperor Of Folk Songs Abdul Alim আবদুল আলীম
- Born: 27 July 1931; Talibpur, Murshidabad, West Bengal, British India
- Died: 5 September 1974 (aged 43) PG Hospital, Dhaka, Bangladesh
- Occupation: Playback Singer
- Instruments: Vocals
- Spouse: Begum Jamila Khatun

Abdul Alim (27 July 1931 – 5 September 1974) was a Bangladeshi folk singer. He won the Bangladesh National Film Award for Best Male Playback Singer in 1975 for playback in Sujan Sakhi. He was posthumously awarded the Ekushey Padak in 1977 and Independence Day Award in 1997 by the government of Bangladesh.

== Career ==
Abdul Alim migrated from Murshidabad to Dhaka after the partition of India in 1947, and joined the Dhaka Radio Station as a staff artiste. By the age of 14, he had recorded two songs. In Dhaka, he took lessons from Mumtaz Ali Khan and Mohammed Hossain Khosru. He got his breakthrough while performing songs at the Alia Madrasah in Calcutta. He was awarded five gold medals for his performances and contributions to music at the All Pakistan music conference in Lahore.

Abdul Alim recorded over 300 Gramophone records. He sang playbacks in over 100 films. He recorded songs for Mukh O Mukhosh, the first film to be produced in the erstwhile East Pakistan.

== Works ==
Notable songs

- "Nobi Mor Poroshmoni"
- "Premer Mora Jole Dube Na"
- Chirodin Pushlam Ak Achin Pakhi
- Ei Je Duniya Kishero Lagia
- Shorbonasha Padma Nodi
- Holudia Pakhi Shonar Boron
- Naiya Rey Nayer Badaam Tuila
- Duarey Aishachey Palki
- Amare Shajay Dio Nowshar Shajey
- Porer Jaiga Porer Jomi
- Mon-e Boro Asha Chhilo Jabo Modina-e
- Shab Shakhire Par Korite Nebo Ana Ana
- Ujaan Gang-er Naiyya
- Nach Re O Kathputli Nach (Urdu)
- Doyal Tomar Pane Chaiya

== Awards ==
- Bangladesh National Film Award for Best Male Playback Singer (1975)
- Ekushey Padak (1977)
- Independence Day Award (1997)
- Pride of Performance Award (Tamgha-E-Husn-Karkardagi) (1960)
- Bachsas Awards (1972-1973)

== Personal life and legacy ==
Abdul Alim has three sons (Jahir Alim, Azgar Alim and Haider Alim) and four daughters (Akhter Jahan Alim, Asia Alim, Nurjahan Alim and Zohora Alim). Abdul Alim died on 5 September 1974, at PG Hospital in Dhaka, Bangladesh.

His wife Begum Jamila Khatun died on 13 October 2020 at Yamagata Hospital in Dhaka, Bangladesh.

A research-based book on Abdul Alim's life, titled Bangla Loko Sangeet-er Amar Kanthoshilpi Abdul Alim along with a DVD, titled Tomaro Lagiarey, were launched in 2015.
