= A. K. Azad =

Bangladeshi music director

A. K. Azad is a Bangladeshi film score composer. He won Bangladesh National Film Award for Best Music Director and Bachsas Award for Best Music Director for 2013 film Mrittika Maya.A.k. Azad died on 3rd June,2014.
