= Ismail Mohammad =

- ইসমাইল মোহাম্মাদ
- Occupation: Screenwriter
- Years active: 1968–1989
- Notable work: Ma O Chele
- Awards: National Film Award (1st time)

Ismail Mohammad (born Udayan Chowdhury) is a Bangladeshi screenwriter, dialogue and story writer. In 1985, he won Bangladesh National Film Award for Best Screenplay for the film Ma O Chele.

== Selected films ==
- Etotuku Asha - 1968
- Neel Akasher Nichey - 1969
- Deep Nebhe Nai - 1970
- Osru Diye Lekha - 1972
- Alor Michil - 1974
- Kajol Rekha - 1976
- Angaar - 1978
- Anuraag - 1979
- Bhanga Gora - 1981
- Rajanigandha - 1982
- Megh Bijlee Badal - 1983
- Lalu Bhulu - 1983
- Awara - 1985
- Ma o Chhele - 1985
- Byathar Daan - 1989

== Awards and nominations ==
National Film Awards

Year	Award	Category	Film	Result
1985	National Film Award	Best Screenplay	Ma O Chele	Won
