= Farid Ahmed (musician) =

Bangladeshi composer (1960–2021)

- ফরিদ আহমেদ
- Born: M Farid Ahmed Hazra; 3 October 1960; Dhaka, East Pakistan, Pakistan
- Died: 13 April 2021 (aged 60); Dhaka, Bangladesh
- Occupation: Music composer

M Farid Ahmed Hazra (known as Farid Ahmed; 3 October 1960 – 13 April 2021) was a Bangladeshi composer and music director. He won the Bangladesh National Film Award for Best Music Director for his music direction in the film Tumi Robe Nirobe (2017). As of 2010, he had over 250 scores for television serials and almost 2,000 scores for short television plays to his credit.

== Career ==
Ahmed was born on 3 October 1960, in the Kalabagan neighborhood in Dhaka. He played bass for film in 1983. He then worked as an assistant for composer Sheikh Sadi Khan. Ahmed debuted his career in music direction with Nur Hossain Bolai's film Nishpotti in 1987.

Ahmed got his breakthrough by the composition of Kumar Bishwajit's Tumi Chhara Ami Jeno Morubhumi. The theme songs of Jolkona and Hridoye Mati o Manush by Sabina Yasmin, Ferari Siren by Runa Laila, Griho Bibad by Momtaz Begum, Gohine Shobdo by Rezwana Chowdhury Bonna are composed by Ahmed.

Ahmed composed the theme songs for television show Ittyadi, Shera Kontho, Khude Gaanraj and Amaar Channel i.

Ahmed's notable works include Salauddin Lavlu's Bhober Haat, Abul Hayat's Moner Janala, Jochhonar Phul, Saidul Anam Tutul's Alok Nagar, Mohon Khan's Hotat Shimante, Shomudro Jol, Arannya Anwar's 'Jonok, Amader Nurul Huda, Naresh Bhuiya's Godhulir Aalo, Akashe Onek Raat and Arun Chowdhury's Tourist and Hotel Holiday.

Ahmed died from COVID-19 on 13 April 2021, during the COVID-19 pandemic in Bangladesh, after suffering 20 days from the virus.

== Works ==
Background scores

- Gulshan Avenue
- Shiyal Pondit
- Projapoti Mon
- Suborno Shopno
- Nondini
- Chhayabithi
- Momer Putul
- Lolita
- Gunin
