= Sayeem Rana =

Bangladeshi singer, composer, music director and professor

- Born: Sayeem Rana; 1 March 1975 (age 51); Kushtia, Bangladesh
- Education: Dhaka University
- Occupations: Teaching and Music Direction
- Notable work: Nekabborer Mohaproyan, O Shohagi, Alo Amar Alo (music director).
- Awards: National Film Awards (2014), Prothom Alo Best Book Award (1416), Sprauting Seeds International Short Film Award (2020), Arirang Singing Contest Silver Award (South Korea) (2015), and Dean's Award 2022 (Faculty of Arts, University of Dhaka)

Sayeem Rana (born 1 March 1975) is a Bangladeshi singer & composer, Film music director, poet and music professor. His official name is Md. Ziaur Rahman. He won Bangladesh National Film Awards in best music director category for the film Nekabborer Mohaproyan in 2014. Prothom Alo Best Book Award (1416), Sprauting Seeds International Short Film Award (2020), Arirang Singing Contest Silver Award in South Korea (2015), and Dean's Award (2022) at the Faculty of Arts in the University of Dhaka). He is an associate professor in the Department of Music of Dhaka University.

== Early life ==
Sayeem Rana was born on 01 March 1975 at the Arua Para Town of Kushtia in Kushtia District of Bangladesh to Abdus Sobhan and Amina Khatun. He completed the Secondary certificate course from Kushtia High school 1991, and higher secondary certificate from Kushtia Government College 1993. He graduated in June 1996 and obtained his post-graduate degree in January 1997 in Islamic studies from Dhaka University. In January 2009, he earned his PhD degree on the title Mass Music of Bangladesh: Subject and Tune Variation from the same university in the department of theatre and music.

== Career ==
Rana joined the Department of Film and Media of Stamford University Bangladesh as a part-time lecturer in 2010. In 2015, he joined the University of Dhaka as a lecturer in the Department of Music. In 2015, Rana launched a book titled A Historical Perception of Traditional Musical Instruments for Younger Generation.
