= Milton Khondokar =

Bangladeshi film lyricist, music director and film director

- মিল্টন খন্দকার
- Born: 25 June 1967 (age 58); Kushtia, Khulna, Bangladesh
- Occupations: Music director, film lyricist.
- Years active: 1988–present
- Notable work: Khodar Pore Ma
- Children: 2 daughters
- Awards: National Film Award (1st time)

Milton Khondokar (born 25 June 1967) is a Bangladeshi film lyricist, music director, and film director. He has written songs, composed music, and contributed to many films and albums in Bangladesh. He won Bangladesh National Film Award for Best Lyrics for the film Khodar Pore Ma (2012).

== Early life ==
Khondokar was born on 25 June 1967 in Kushtia, Bangladesh. He became interested in music and the arts from a young age and later studied music formally.

== Career ==
Khondokar began his career in the Bangladeshi music and film industry in the late 1980s. He has written lyrics and composed music for many songs used in films, albums, radio, and television. Over his long career, he has worked with many noted singers and musicians, and his songs are popular across Bangladesh. He has also worked as a music director in films, including composing music for the 2005 film Taka. In addition to his songwriting and music direction, Khondokar has been involved in film direction and has contributed creatively to the film industry.

== Selected films ==
- Utthan Poton - 1992
- Ghatok - 1994
- Commander - 1994
- Papi Shatru - 1995
- Ei Ghor Ei Songsar - 1995
- Shilpi - 1995
- Bichar Hobe - 1996
- Priyojon - 1996
- Nirmom - 1996
- Palabi Kothae - 1997
- Madam Fuli - 1997
- Pagla Ghonta - 1999
- Ononto Bhalobasa - 1999
- Joddha - 2000
- Karagar - 2000
- Tyag - 2004
- Lal Sobuj - 2005
- Chehara: Vondo-2 - 2010
- Evabey Bhalobasha Hoi - 2010
- Loknayok Kangal Harinath - 2010
- Khodar Pore Ma - 2012

== Notable songs ==
- Khub Kasakasi Tumi Ami Achi
- Rongchata Jinser Pant Pora
- Ami Pathore Ful Fotabo
- O Sathire Jeona Kokhono Dure
- Ami Je Ke Tomar Kashe Ese
- Tomra Kauke Bolona
- Akashete Lakkho Tara
- Tomar Kono Dosh Nai
- Krishtan Hoile Kofine
- Chal Nei Chula Nei
- Jani R Konodin Amar Hobena
- Sukhe Thaka Holona Amar
- Laal Benarashi
- Ajke Tomar Gaye Halud
- O Priyojon Boro Ayojon Kore
- Ma Tumi Amar Age Jeyonago More
- Ami Jassi Baba
- Sabujer Buke Laal Urbei Chirokal

== Awards and nominations ==
National Film Awards

Year	Award	Category	Film	Result
2012	National Film Award	Best Lyrics	Khodar Pore Ma	Won
