= SM Haroon-or-Rashid =

Bangladeshi journalist

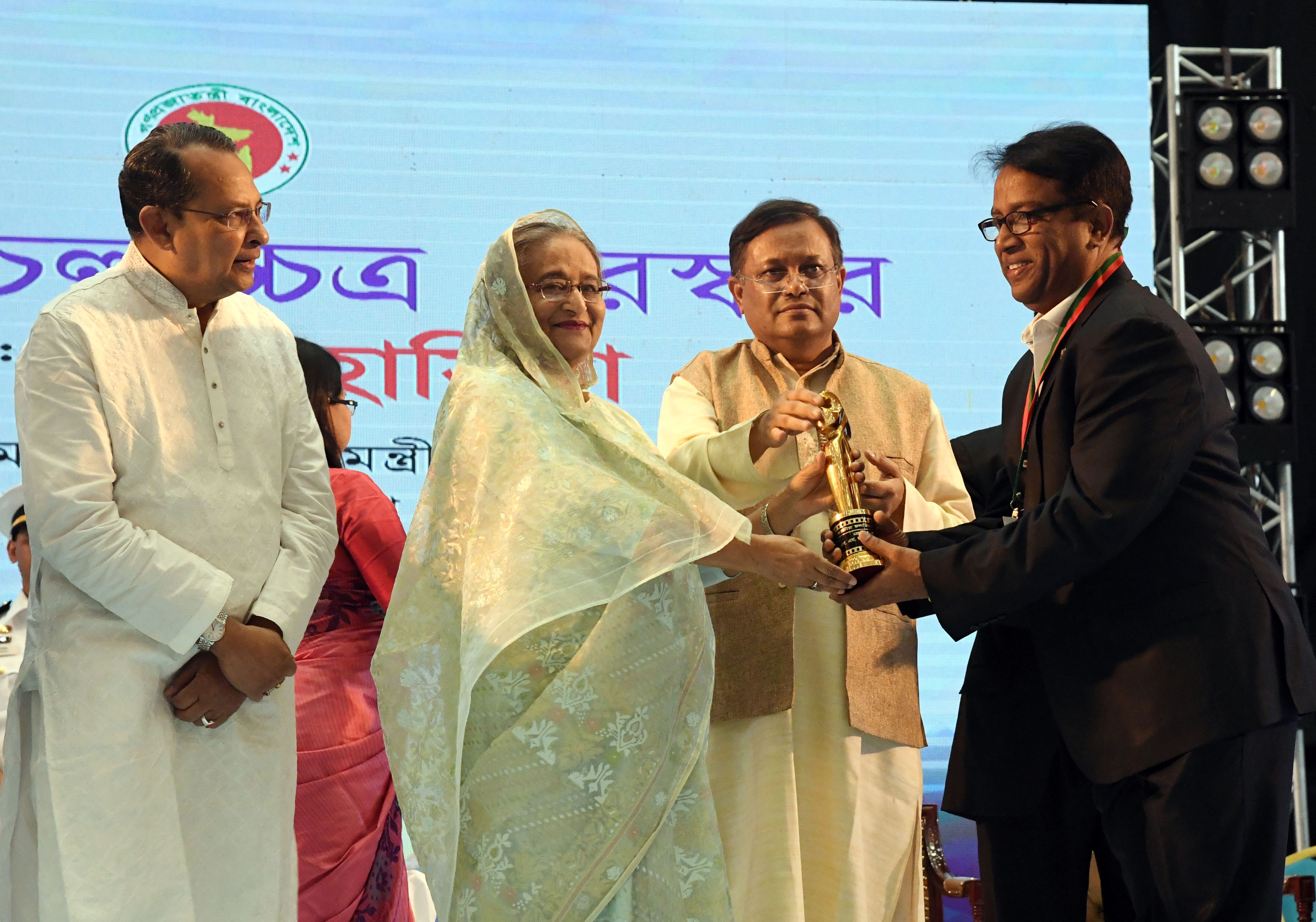
- Rashid receiving National Film Award (2019)

Director General of Bangladesh Television
- In office 14 January 2016 – 18 February 2021
- Preceded by: M Hamid
- Succeeded by: Sohrab Hossain

Personal details
- Born: 1962 (age 63–64) Sirajganj District, East Pakistan, Pakistan
- Education: University of Dhaka

SM Haroon-or-Rashid (known as Harun Rashid; born 1962) is a Bangladeshi journalist and dramatist. He is a former director general of Bangladesh Television during 2016–2021. He won the Bangladesh National Film Award for Best Dialogue for the film Putro (2018).

== Education ==
Rashid completed his bachelor's and master's in mass communication and journalism from the University of Dhaka.

== Career ==
Rashid retired from the government service on 18 February 2021.
