= Masud Pathik =

Bangladeshi filmmaker

- মাসুদ পথিক
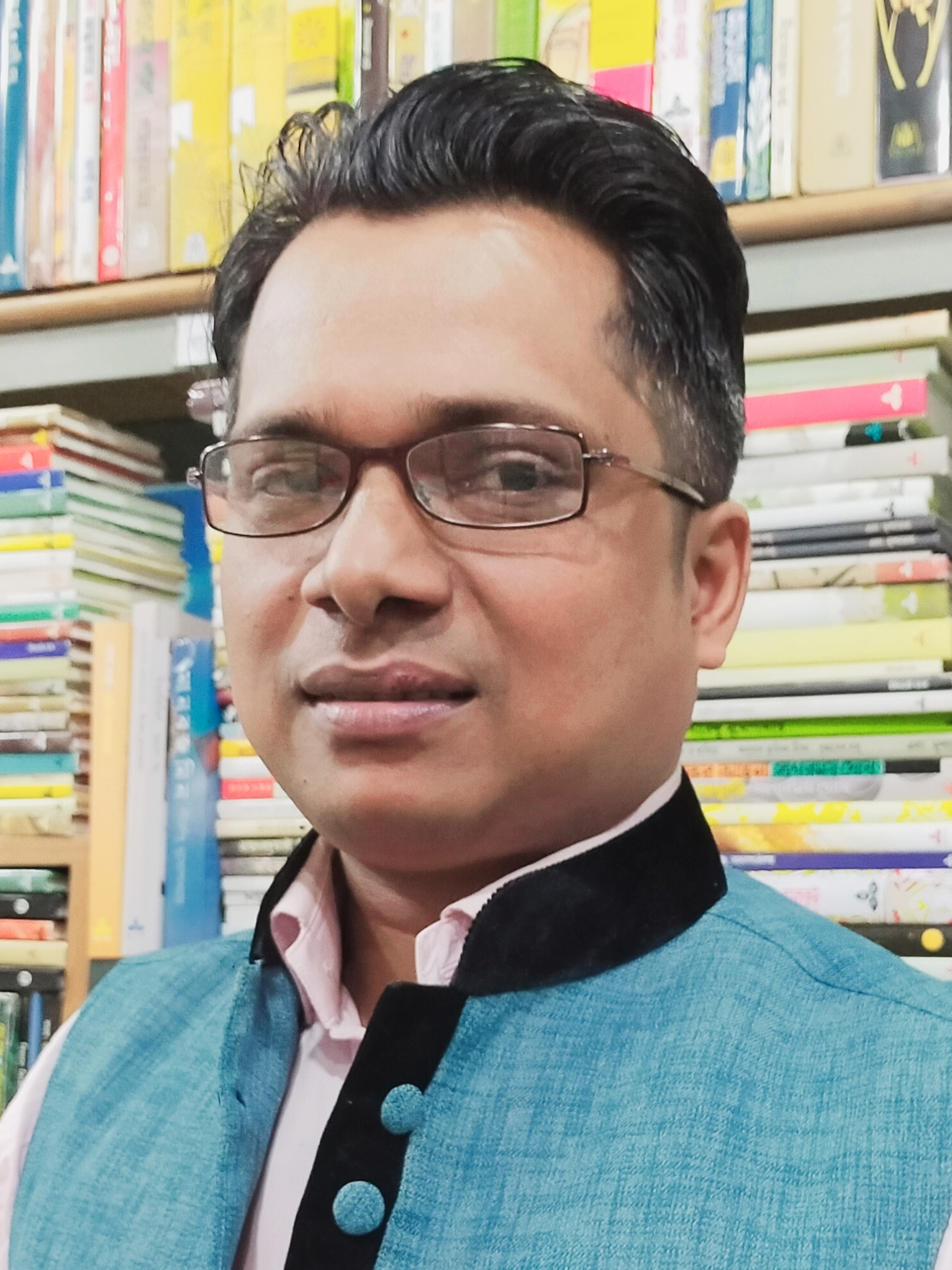
- Pathik in 2020
- Born: 1 August 1979 (age 47); Raipura, Narsingdi, Bangladesh
- Education: University of Dhaka
- Occupations: Filmmaker, poet
- Years active: 2014–present

Masud Pathik (born 1 August 1979) is a Bangladeshi filmmaker, poet and lyricist. His feature films Nekabborer Mohaproyan (2014) won seven and Maya: The Lost Mother (2019) won eight Bangladesh National Film Awards. Individually, he won the Best Lyrics and Best Story awards. For his poetry, he won the 2013 HSBC Kali O Kalam award for his poem Ekaki Jomin. He won 2023 Bangla Academy Literary Award in the playwright category.

== Early life and education ==
Pathik was born on 1 August 1979 at Raipura Upazila in Narsingdi District. He earned his PhD from the University of Dhaka on the topic of Bangladeshi Cinema. He took a film appreciation course in 2008 organised by Bishwo Shahitto Kendro in Dhaka. As of August 2020, he has been researching on film at Assam University.

== Career ==
Pathik edits a magazine, Bratya, that focuses on the life and livelihood of the subaltern people of Bangladesh. He also acts as the assistant editor of Pothorekha, a literary magazine in Bangladesh, and he is an executive member of Jatiyo Kobita Parishad, Bangladesh. He is the founder and chairman of Bratya Film, and Bratya Creation.

Pathik's film Nekabbarer Mahaproyan won seven National Film awards. The original winner of the Best Film Award, Brihonnola, was disqualified due to plagiarism.

His film Maya: The Lost Mother was based on artist Shahabuddin Ahmed's painting The Woman.

Pathik's first poem Krishokphool was published in 1996. As of 2017, he has published 14 books including Chashar Put, Ekaki Jomin, Shetu Harabar Din, Chashar Bachan, Langoler Bhubon and Dadar Khorom.

== Criticism ==
Masud Pathik took a stand for the government during the 2024 Bangladesh quota reform movement. During the movement, a group of pro-autocracy Awami artists, including Masud Pathik, were active against the movement in a WhatsApp group called 'Alo Ashbei' led by actor Ferdous. After the non-cooperation movement, on September 3, 2024, some screenshots related to that WhatsApp group were spread on social media.

== Filmography ==
- 2014 Nekabborer Mohaproyan (feature film)
- 2015 Alor Pother Sarothi (documentary)
- 2019 Maya: The Lost Mother (feature film)

== Awards ==
- HSBC Kali O Kalam Award (2013)
- Bangladesh National Film Award for Best Lyrics (2014)
- Ritwik Ghatak Memorial Award (2017)
- Bangladesh National Film Award for Best Story (2019)
- Bangla Academy Literary Award 2023
