= Naimul Islam Ratul =

Bangladeshi singer

Ratul নাইমুল ইসলাম রাতুল
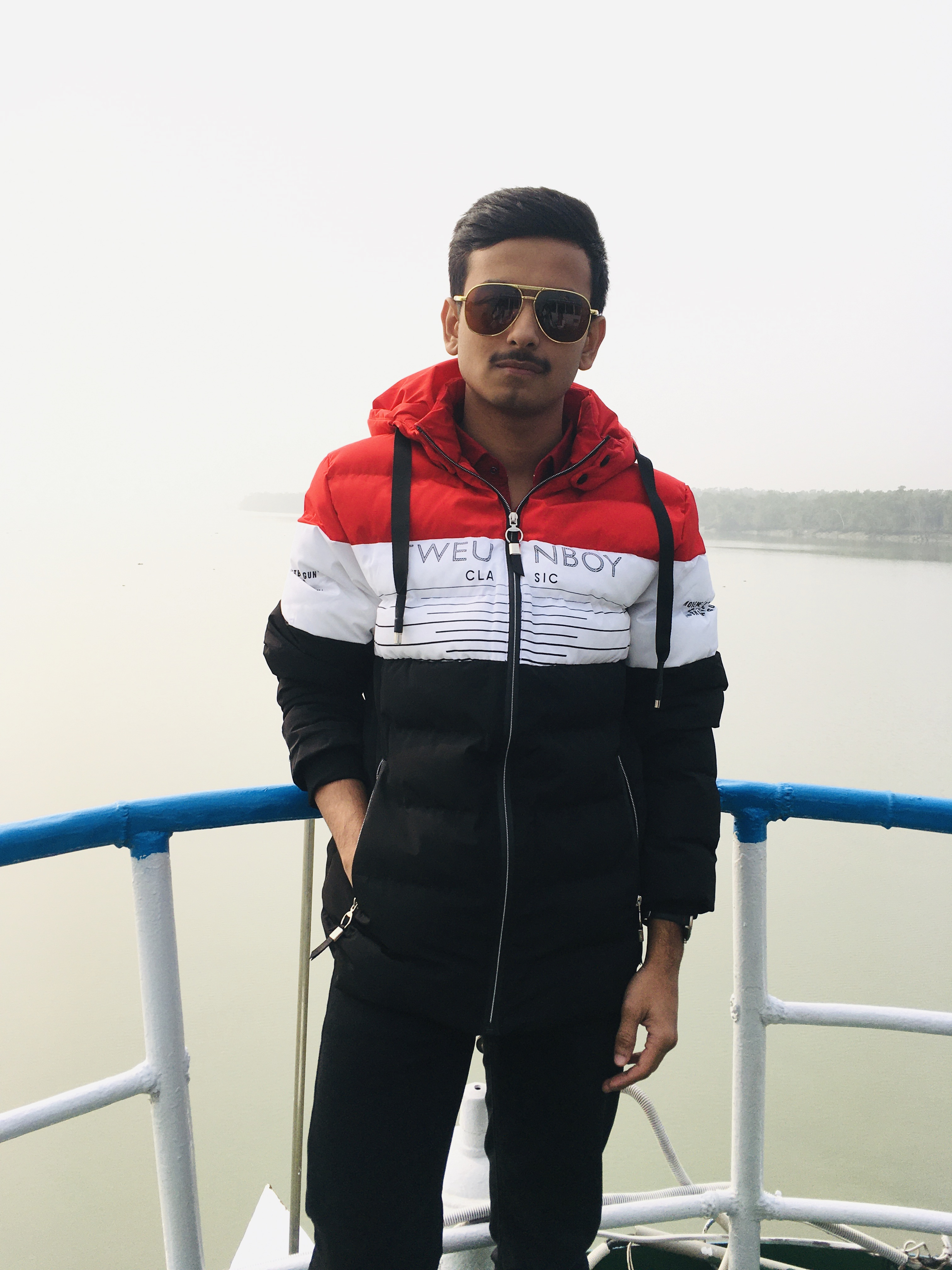

Background information
- Born: Naimul Islam Ratul; 16 February; Khulna, Bangladesh
- Genres: Pop
- Occupation: Playback singer
- Instruments: Vocal, harmonium, guitar

Naimul Islam Ratul simply known as Ratul is a Bangladeshi musician. He won National Film Awards 2018 in the Best Male Playback Singer category.

== Career ==
Ratul became the second runner-up in Meridian-Channel i Khude Gaanraj in 2013. He worked as a playback singer in Putro. This film was released in 2018. He sang the song titled "Jodi Dukkho Chhuye" in this film. For this song he won the national film award. He released his first music video Sajna Re in 2019.
