= Shanus =

Scientific classification
- Kingdom: Animalia
- Phylum: Arthropoda
- Subphylum: Chelicerata
- Class: Arachnida
- Order: Araneae
- Infraorder: Araneomorphae
- Family: Linyphiidae
- Genus: Shanus; Tanasevitch, 2006
- Species: S. taibaiensis

Binomial name
- Shanus taibaiensis Tanasevitch, 2006

Genus of spiders

Shanus is a monotypic genus of East Asian sheet weavers containing the single species, Shanus taibaiensis. It was first described by A. V. Tanasevitch in 2006, and has only been found in China.
