= Mission Piar =

One of the Bolivarian Missions

Misión Piar is one of the Bolivarian Missions (a series of anti-poverty and social welfare programs) implemented by the then Venezuelan president Hugo Chávez. The mission falls in line with the current Integral Plan of Sustainable Development for Mining Communities (Plan Integral de Desarrollo Sustentable de las Comunidades Mineras) advanced by Chávez. Executed by the Ministry of Energy and Mines, the Mission seeks to improve the quality of life of small-scale miners while promoting environmental sustainability. It is currently one of the smallest-scale and lowest impact Missions currently operating. It is named after Venezuelan independence hero Manuel Piar.
