= Saiful Islam Mannu =

Bangladeshi film director

- Occupation: filmmaker
- Spouses: Sadia Shabnam Shantu

Saiful Islam Mannu is a Bangladeshi film director. He won Bangladesh National Film Award for Best Screenplay for the film Putro (2018). Putro owns a total of 11 categories of national awards. As of 2018, he directed 787 television episodes, more than a hundred telefilms, 87 one-hour dramas, four feature films, and several documentaries.

== Career ==
In 2012 Mannu debuted in film direction through Charulata, a digital film to celebrate the 151st birth anniversary of Rabindranath Tagore on the adapted story, Noshto Nir.

Mannu was the director, screenwriter, and lyricist of the film Putro (2018). His film Payer Chhap owns 3 national awards, also his film Unveiled owns 7 international awards.

== Personal life ==
Mannu is married to Sadia Shabnam Shantu. She won the Bangladesh National Film Award for Best Costume Design for the Putro film.

== Works ==
- Shwapnoloker Deshey (2005)
- Khuje Berai Taare (2006)
- Amar Bou Shob Janey (2008)
- Forgive Me (2012)
- Chaar Deyaler Kabbyo (2012)
- Hoihoi Roiroi (2013)
- Karo Kono Neeti Nai (2013)
- Bheja Bheja Brishtite (2014)
- Cholo Hariye Jai (2015)
- Putro (2018)
