= Jago FM =

- DhakaCumilla; Bangladesh
- Frequency: 94.4 MHz

Programming
- Language: Bangla
- Format: Music Radio & Program

Ownership
- Owner: AKC Private Limited

History
- First air date: 27 October 2015

Links
- Website: jago.fm

Jago FM is a Bangladeshi FM radio station, headquartered in Dhaka. It started broadcasting on 27 October 2015. There are many shows in Jago FM 94.4. The most famous show is "Bhoot Studio" & "Love Story". "Bhoot Studio" is broadcast every Thursday at 10:00 PM & "Love Story" starts every Saturday at 10:00 PM.
