= Shanu (actress) =

Bangladeshi actress

- শানু
- Occupation: Film actress
- Years active: 2001–Present
- Notable work: Bou Shashurir Juddho; Shikari
- Awards: National Film Award (1st time)

Shanu is a Bangladeshi film actress. She won Bangladesh National Film Award for Best Performance in a Negative Role for the 2003 film Bou Shashurir Juddho.

== Selected films ==
- Shikari - 2001
- Juari - 2002
- Bou Shashurir Juddho - 2003
- Vondo Neta - 2004

== Awards and nominations ==
National Film Awards

Year	Award	Category	Film	Result
2003	National Film Award	Best Performance in a Negative Role	Bou Shashurir Juddho	Won
