= Oggatonama =

2016 film

- Film poster
- Directed by: Tauquir Ahmed
- Written by: Tauquir Ahmed
- Produced by: Faridur Reza Sagar
- Starring: Fazlur Rahman Babu; Shahiduzzaman Selim; Mosharraf Karim; Nipun Akter; Shatabdi Wadud
- Cinematography: Enamul Haque Sohel
- Music by: Pinto Ghosh
- Distributed by: Impress Telefilm
- Release dates: 21 May 2016 (Gulf of Naples Independent Film Festival); 19 August 2016 (Bangladesh)
- Running time: 100 minutes
- Country: Bangladesh
- Language: Bengali

Oggatonama (Bengali: অজ্ঞাতনামা lit. 'The Unnamed') is a 2016 Bangladeshi drama film directed and written by Tauquir Ahmed. It was selected as the Bangladeshi entry for the Best Foreign Language Film at the 89th Academy Awards, but it was not nominated. The film stars Fazlur Rahman Babu, Shahiduzzaman Selim, Mosharraf Karim, Nipun Akter, Shatabdi Wadud, and several others. Oggatonama was released on 19 August 2016 in Bangladesh by Impress Telefilm. It is about a Bangladeshi migrant who dies after illegally entering the United Arab Emirates with a fake passport. The Bangladesh police receive the wrong corpse.

== Plot ==
Asiruddin Pramanik, the son of Kifayet Uddin Pramanik (Fazlur Rahman Babu), goes to Ajman with a fake passport, identified as Sheikh Abdul Wahhab, bought from Ramjan (Shahiduzzaman Selim). A group of policemen, headed by MA Kuddus (Shatabdi Wadud), had to get the dead body of "Wahhab" after a deadly incident in Ajman had occurred, killing six people, and they first go to Shubgacha to confirm Wahhab's death to his family. As it turns out, Wahhab is alive and lives in Rome and formerly worked in Ajman, as confirmed by his father (Abul Hayat). It was later revealed that the one died in Ajman was, in fact, Asiruddin Pramanik, who went there with Wahhab's old passport tempered with Pramanik's photo.

Kifayet and Ramjan later go to the Shah Jalal International Airport to collect the dead body of Asir. While preparing to bury him, the body was apparently uncircumcised. Then, it was revealed that there was a mix up of the bodies. Beauty (Nipun Akter) who was supposed to go to Ajman as Pramanik's wife, had her police clearance ready, but later decides not to go there. Ramjan and Kifayet go to Dhaka again with Farhad (Mosharraf Karim) to go to various places and even the airport but none of them were willing to do anything with the body. MA Kuddus later contacts the Embassy of Bangladesh in the United Arab Emirates, and found out that Asir was actually dead and there is nothing to do if there is a mix up of bodies, since the six people who have died, including Asir himself, in the incident were unidentifiable. Kifayet decided to bury the body with his own hands.

== Cast ==
- Fazlur Rahman Babu as Kifayet Uddin Pramanik
- Shahiduzzaman Selim as Ramjan Ali
- Mosharraf Karim as Farhad
- Nipun Akter as Beauty
- Shatabdi Wadud as MA Kuddus (Officer in Charge)
- Abul Hayat as Wahab's father, Sheikh Abdul Hakim
- Shahed Sharif Khan as Wadud
- Shahed Ali
- Robena Reza Jui
- Ziaul Huq Kislu
- Nazmul Huda Bacchu
- Momen Chodhury

== Awards ==
Award	Date of ceremony	Category	Recipient(s) and nominee(s)	Result	Ref.
Bangladesh National Film Awards	8 July 2018	Best Film	Faridur Reza Sagar	Won	
Bangladesh National Film Awards	8 July 2018	Best Performance in a Negative Role	Shahiduzzaman Selim	Won	
Bangladesh National Film Awards	8 July 2018	Best Story	Tauquir Ahmed	Won	

== See also ==
- List of submissions to the 89th Academy Awards for Best Foreign Language Film
- List of Bangladeshi submissions for the Academy Award for Best International Feature Film
