= Affan Mitul =

Bangladeshi film actor (born 1988)

- আফফান মিতুল
- Born: 2 March 1988 (age 38); Kishoreganj, Bangladesh
- Education: Government Laboratory High School (secondary); Daffodil International University (graduation)
- Occupation: Film artist
- Years active: 2014–present

Affan Mitul (born 2 March 1988) is a Bangladeshi film actor. He made his debut in 2014 with national film award winning movie "Nekabborer Mohaproyan", after this movie he appearing in several films. In 2022, he acted in a film as protagonist titled Moyna which was produced by Jaaz Multimedia. He plays the role of a "rockstar Roni" in this film. He has appeared in a number of released and upcoming films such as Adom, where he got as co artist Miss World Bangladesh fame Zannatul Ferdous Oishee Gontobyo, Nishchup Bhalobasha, Nekabborer Mohaproyan, Horijon etc are Affan Mitul's acted some significant movies.

== Early life and education ==
Affan Mitul was born on 2 March 1988 in Kishoreganj, Bangladesh. He completed his secondary from Government Laboratory High School and graduated from Daffodil International University in Journalism and Mass Communication.

== Career ==
Mitul has made his acting debut in 2007 with the television drama Antorale. The turning point of his Television career came in 2008 when he was cast in Humayun Ahmed's drama Nuruddin Swarno Padak. His debut film was Horijon (2014), which starred himself as the lead protagonist and Jayanta Chattopadhyay and Rokeya Prachi in supporting roles.

His first film as an adult was Nekabborer Mohaproyan which was released on 20 June, 2014. His first commercial film as a lead hero came in 2018 when he starred alongside debutant Sara Zerin in the film Nishchup Bhalobasha. The film was a moderate success at box office. Since then there is no looking for him. In 2020, He was roped in to play the role of a Salman Shah fan in the film Swapner Pheriwala. Actress Sheetal was cast opposite him in her debut film role. The film is set on 6 September 1996, the day of Salman Shah's demise. Mitul will play the role of fan who hears the news of his death on television and rushes to his home. In a dense crowd, he gets trampled and dies. The film is still in production. In 2021, He appeared in a patriotic film called Gontobyo which stars Ferdous Ahmed, Jayanta Chattopadhyay and Elina Shammi in lead roles. Till Now, he went on to appear in a total of 6 films. In 2022, four of his films got released which includes Adom, Moyna etc. Moyna which is produced by Jaaz Multimedia. He plays the role of a rockstar Roni in this film and actress Raj Ripa has played his love interest. In Adom, he is starred opposite Miss World Bangladesh 2018 Jannatul Ferdous Oishee. Singer Layla will make her film debut with the song "Konya Bisorjon", which will be picturized on them.

Apart from films he has also appeared in several television dramas and web series. In July 2022, his web series Psycho Lover got released in which je plays a psycho lover who stalks a girl, played by Aurin. He appeared in a number of television dramas as well which includes Amio Ki Muktijoddha? (2018), Ghum Amay Dakchhe (2021) etc. In 2018, he played the role of a freedom fighter in Telefilm Amio Ki Muktijoddha? (i.e. Am I A Freedom Fighter?) He played the brother-in-law of actor Shajal Noor. It was telecast on 26 March 2018.

Till now, he has appeared in a total of 87 Television dramas and 11 films.

== Filmography ==
Year	Film	Role	Notes	Ref.
2014	Nekabborer Mohaproyan	Torab Ali		
2014	Horijon	Vui Mali		
2021	Gontobbo	Mitul		
2021	Pagoler Moto Bhalobashi			
2023	Adam	Mati		
2023	Apolap		Released on DeeptoPlay	
2025	Mayna			
2025	Ghumpori		Released on Chorki	

== Television ==
Year	Web Series/Drama	Director	Notes
2007	Antorale	Mirza Sakhawat Hossain	Television Drama
2008	Dui Dugune Chaar	Mostafizur Rahman Babu	Television Drama
2008	Se Ki Amay Nebe Chine?	Kamal Chakma	Television Drama
2008	Nuruddin Swarna Padak	Humayun Ahmed	Television Drama
2009	The Cow	Kamruzzaman Rony	Television Drama
2009	Digbaji	Faruk Ahmed	Television Drama
2010	Katrina Kaif Er Beauty Parlour	Muntasir Rossi	Television Drama
2010	Shesh Bikeler Alo	P. G. Mostafa	Television Drama
2010	Ekti Jiboner Golpo	Biplob Kumar Pal	Television Drama
2010	Probhati Sobuj Songho	Shamim Shahed	Television Drama
2011	Pani Poraa	Faruk Ahmed	Television Drama
2011	Ami Natok Banachchhi	Siddiqur Rahman	Television Drama
2011	Celibrity	Ali Affan Ahmed	Television Drama
2011	Ripon Miya	Anik	Television Drama
2011	Mokbul	Mir Sabbir	Television Drama
2011	Chowdhury Khalequzzaman er Bishwo Record	Meher Afroz Shawon	Television Drama
2011	Ekbar Mugdho Hote Chai	Shamim Shahed	Television Drama
2012	Nirob Bhalobasha	Muntasir Rossi	Television Drama
2012	Swapno Dekhar Sahos	Dima Nefartiti	Television Drama
2012	Itibritto	Nasirul Imam	Television Drama
2012	Minus-e Minus-e Plus	Selim E Ahmed	Television Drama
2013	Hashi Bari	Shahin Mahmud	Television Drama
2013	Jokhon Giyechhe Dube Ponchomir Chand	Sarder Rokon	Television Drama
2013	Biswas Abiswas	Zahir Khan	Television Drama
2013	Marriage Media	Arifur Nahid	Television Drama
2013	Pagoler Ankhra	Badol Ahmed Sagor	Television Drama
2013	Door Into The Dark	M. A. Salam	Television Drama
2013	Uttoron	Beduyin Haidar Leo	Television Drama
2014	Ho-Jo-Bo-Ro-Lo	Chanda Mahjabin	Television Drama
2014	Chhobor Haat	Gazi Apel Mahmud	Television Drama
2015	Nayok	Shakilur Rahman	Television Drama
2015	10 Feet by 10 Feet	Sarder Rokon	Television Drama
2015	Bortomane Fokir	Tarek Miazi	Television Drama
2016	Robot Bou	Irani Biswas	Television Drama
2016	Meher Amar Bon	Progga Niharika	Television Drama
2016	Makeup Sundori	Kashem Shikdar	Television Drama
2016	Dhusor Kuasha	Taju Kamrul	Television Drama
2016	Uddipon (Ahongkar)	Asim Gomez	Television Drama
2016	Somoyer Golpo (Kritogno)	Topu Khan	Television Drama
2016	Jibon Theke Neya Ei Shohorer Golpo	Shahriar Sajeeb	Television Drama
2016	Eid Er Chhuti	Nazrul Qureshi	Television Drama
2016	Rajkumari	Nazrul Qureshi	Television Drama
2016	Jemon Khushi Temon Sajo	Moniruzzaman Lipon	Television Drama
2017	Tor Jonno Baji	Azad Al Mamun	Television Drama
2017	Ei Tumi Ele	G. M. Soikot	Television Drama
2017	Lady Goyenda (Murder Mystery of Tisha)	G. M. Soikot	Television Drama
2017	Chapabaz	Hasan Jahangir	Television Drama
2017	DB (Murder Mystery of Toufik)	D. A. Tayeb	Television Drama
2018	Amio Ki Muktijoddha?	Shahin Mahmud	Television Drama
2018	Bhokto	Evan Mollik	Television Drama
2018	Tomar Haat Dhorbo Bole	Biplab Paul	Television Drama
2018	Ora Tulip Bhalobashe	Farid Uddin Mohammad	Television Drama
2018	Kichhu Atpoure Jiboner Gaan	Mahmud Didar	Television Drama
2018	Uro Kotha	Irani Biswas	Television Drama
2018	Sourov	Irani Biswas	Television Drama
2018	Laila Lathial	Irani Biswas	Television Drama
2018	Local Director	Kashem Shikdar	Television Drama
2018	Bodhu Michhe Raag Korona	Shikhor Shahoniat	Television Drama
2018	Saaper Kanna	R A Rahul	Television Drama
2018	Ek Je Achhe Maa	Sanjoy Somadder	Television Drama
2018	Parbo Na Chharte Toke	Sabuj Khan	Television Drama
2019	Somporker Sondhane	Irani Biswas	Television Drama
2019	Bodragi Bodrul	Nayan Milton	Television Drama
2019	Lulu Pagla	Azim Khan	Television Drama
2019	Director Ekhon Meeting E	Asif Ahmed	Television Drama
2019	Dajjal Shashuri	Noyon Milton	Television Drama
2019	Kana Baba	Noyon Milton	Television Drama
2019	Adom Bepari	Noyon Milton	Television Drama
2019	Motu vs Patlu	Noyon Milton	Television Drama
2019	Chor Songho	Noyon Milton	Television Drama
2019	Swapne Jorano Surer Taar	Aditya Johnny	Television Drama
2019	Shubho Jonmodin	Simanto Sajal	Television Drama
2019	Promotion	Parthiv Mamun	Television Drama
2019	Madhobilota	Habib Shakil	Television Drama
2019	Online Prem	Taju Kamrul	Television Drama
2020	Siri	Joy Sarkar	Television Drama
2020	Psycho Lover	Sabuj Khan	Television Drama
2021	Ghum Amay Dakchhe	Joy Sarkar	Television Drama
2021	Bhalobasha Ai Pothe Geche	Sabuj Khan	Television Drama
2021	Joggo Shishyo	Sabuj Khan	Television Drama
2021	Ami Tumi Se	Saimon Tarik	Television Drama
2021	Joy Baba Digital	Saimon Tarik	Television Drama
2021	Opohoron	Saimon Tarik	Television Drama
2021	Mota Bou	Saimon Tarik	Television Drama
2021	Good Boy vs Bad Boy	Saimon Tarik	Television Drama
2021	Nishi Kanon	Raju Moni	Television Drama
2021	Moho	Rana Ibrahim	Television Drama
2023	Haradhon-er Doshti Chhele	Masud Zakaria Sabin	Web Series
2023	Apolap	Mohammad Ali Munna	Web Film
2026	Roktochaya	Ali Zulfikar Zahedi	Short Film
