= Zahidur Rahman Anjan =

Bangladeshi film director (1964–2025)

- জাহিদুর রহিম অঞ্জন
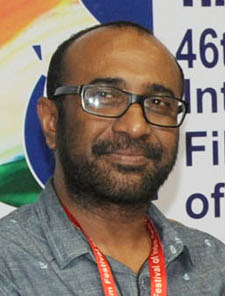
- Anjan in 2015
- Born: 1964
- Died: 24 February 2025 (aged 60); Bengaluru, Karnataka, India
- Occupation: Film director

Zahidur Rahman Anjan (1964 – 24 February 2025) was a Bangladeshi film director. He won a Bangladesh National Film Award for Best Director for his direction of the film Meghmallar (2014). He taught filmmaking and film criticism at the Department of Film and Media Studies, Stamford University Bangladesh.

Anjan died of liver disease on 24 February 2025, at the age of 60.
