= Khandaker Nurul Alam =

Bangladeshi music composer and singer (1937-2016)

- খন্দকার নুরুল আলম
- Born: 1937; Goalpara, Assam, British India
- Died: 22 January 2016 (aged 78–79); Dhaka, Bangladesh
- Awards: Ekushey Padak (2008); Bangladesh National Film Awards (1984, 1986, 1991)

Khandaker Nurul Alam (1937 – 22 January 2016) was a Bangladeshi music composer and singer. He won Bangladesh National Film Award for Best Music Director for the films Chandranath (1984), Shuvoda (1986), and Padma Meghna Jamuna (1991). He was awarded Ekushey Padak in 2008 by the Government of Bangladesh for his contribution to Bangladeshi music.

== Career ==
From the 1960s, Alam was active in the music industry. He was the singer and composer of the song “Chokh Je Moner Kotha Bole” from the film “Je Agune Puri”. He was the composer for films based on the literary works of Sarat Chandra Chattopadhyay - Devdas, Chandranath, Shuvoda, Biraj Bou and others.
