= Zahir Uddin Piar =

Bangladeshi film actor

- জহির উদ্দিন পিয়ার
- Occupation: Film actor
- Years active: 2008–present
- Notable work: Chandragrohon; Sagarika
- Awards: National Film Award (1st time)

Zahir Uddin Piar is a Bangladeshi film actor. He won Bangladesh National Film Award for Best Performance in a Negative Role for the film Chandragrohon (2003)

== Selected films ==
- Ekattorer Jishu - 1993
- Bikkhov - 1994
- Bichar Hobe - 1996
- Shopner Prithibi - 1996
- Shopner Nayok - 1997
- Sagarika - 1998
- Jhor - 2000
- Oder Dhor - 2002
- Chandragrohon - 2008
- Coxbazar Kakatua - 2016

== Awards and nominations ==
National Film Awards

Year	Award	Category	Film	Result
2008	National Film Award	Best Performance in a Negative Role	Chandragrohon	Won
