= 39th Bangladesh National Film Awards =

National Film Awards, Bangladesh

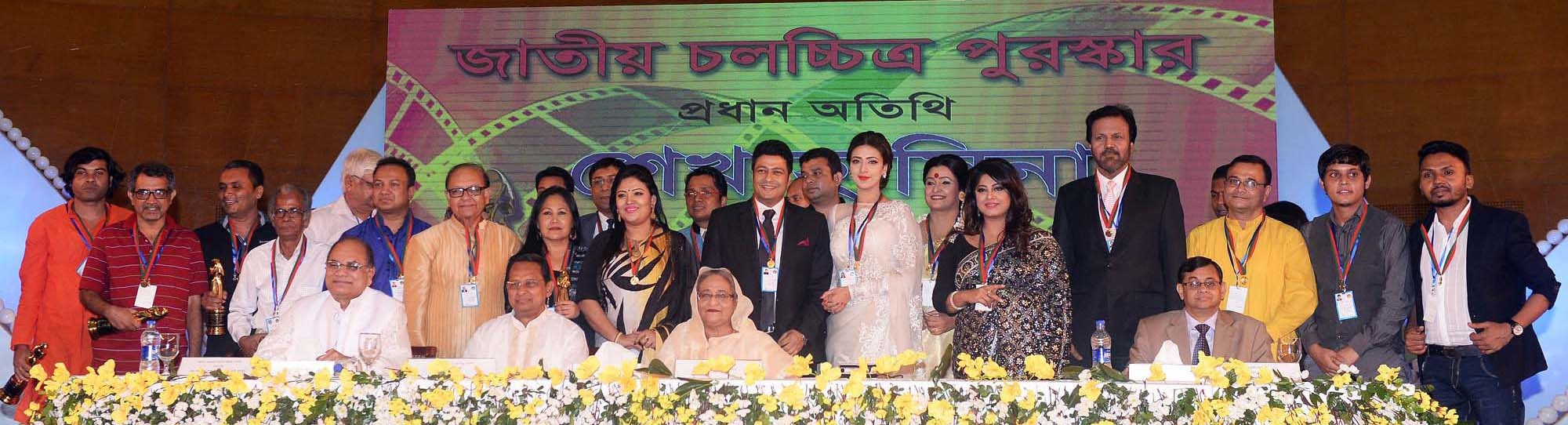
- Award ceremony held on 11 May 2016
- Awarded for: Best of Bangladeshi cinema in 2014
- Awarded by: President of Bangladesh
- Presented by: Ministry of Information
- Announced on: 25 February 2016
- Presented on: 4 April 2016
- Site: Dhaka, Bangladesh
- Official website: www.moi.gov.bd

Highlights
- Best Feature Film: Nekabborer Mohaproyan
- Best Non-feature Film: Gariwala
- Best Actor: Ferdous Ahmed
- Best Actress: Moushumi and Bidya Sinha Mim
- Lifetime achievement: Syed Hasan Imam and Rani Sarker
- Most awards: Nekabborer Mohaproyan (6)

The 39th National Film Awards was presented on 4 April 2016 by the Ministry of Information, Bangladesh to felicitate the best of Bangladeshi films released in the calendar year 2014. The awards were given to 29 personnel in 26 categories.

== List of winners ==
=== Merit awards ===
Name of Awards	Winner(s)	Film
Lifetime Achievement Award	Syed Hasan Imam and Rani Sarker	
Best Film	Masud Pathik	Nekabborer Mohaproyan
Best Documentary Film		Gariwala
Best Director	Zahidur Rahman Anjan	Meghmallar
Best Actor	Ferdous Ahmed	Ek Cup Cha
Best Actress	Moushumi; Bidya Sinha Mim	Taarkata; Jonakir Alo
Best Actor in a Supporting Role	Ejajul Islam	Taarkata
Best Actress in a Supporting Role	Chitralekha Guho	Ekattorer Ma Jononi
Best Actor in a Negative Role	Tariq Anam Khan	Desha: The Leader
Best Actor in a Comedy Role	Misha Sawdagor	Olpo Olpo Premer Golpo
Best Child Artist	Abir Hossain Angkon	Baishamya
Best Child Actress	Marzan Hossain Jara	Meghmallar
Best Music Director	Sayeem Rana	Nekabborer Mohaproyan
Best Music Composer	Belal Khan	Nekabborer Mohaproyan
Best Lyricist	Masud Pathik	Nekabborer Mohaproyan
Best Male Playback Singer	Mahfuz Anam James	Desha: The Leader
Best Female Playback Singer	Runa Laila; Momtaz Begum	Priya Tumi Sukhi Hou; Nekabborer Mohaproyan
Best Story	Zahidur Rahman Anjan	Meghmallar
Best Dialogue	Zahidur Rahman Anjan	Meghmallar
Best Cinematography	Saikat Nasir	Desha: The Leader
Best Art Direction	Samurai Maruf	Taarkata
Best Editing	Towhid Hossain Chowdhury	Desha: The Leader
Best Photography	Mohammad Hossain Jemy	Baishamya
Best Sound Recording	Ratan Pal	Meghmallar
Best Costume Design	Kanak Chanpa Chakma	Jonakir Alo
Best Make-up	Abdur Rahman	Nekabborer Mohaproyan

== See also ==
- Meril Prothom Alo Awards
- Ifad Film Club Award
- Babisas Award
