= Bangladesh Cinema and Television Institute =

Film school in Bangladesh

- Formation: 2019
- Headquarters: Dhaka, Bangladesh
- Region served: Bangladesh
- Official language: Bengali
- Website: Bangladesh Cinema and Television Institute

The Bangladesh Cinema and Television Institute or BCTI (Bengali: বাংলাদেশ চলচ্চিত্র ও টেলিভিশন ইন্সটিটিউট) is a Bangladesh government institute for research and training on film making. The current Director of the institute is Maruf Nawaz.

== History ==
The Bangladesh Cinema and Television Institute was established through the passage of Bangladesh Cinema and Television Institute Bill (Amendment) in the Parliament of Bangladesh in 2019. The bill was moved by Information Minister Hasan Mahmud and was passed through a unanimous vote. The institute is managed by a six-member management committee and run by a director nominated by the Government of Bangladesh.
