= Dolna (film) =

Bangladeshi film

- Poster
- Directed by: Shibli Sadik
- Screenplay by: Shibli Sadik
- Story by: Shibli Sadik (Dialogue)
- Produced by: Fazlur Rashid Dhali
- Starring: Alamgir; Rozina; Khalil Ullah Khan
- Cinematography: Firoz M. Hasan
- Music by: Alam Khan
- Distributed by: Jupiter films
- Release date: 1990
- Running time: 106 minutes
- Country: Bangladesh
- Language: Bengali

Dolna (Bengali: দোলনা) is a Bangladeshi film released in 1990. This Bengali film was directed by Shibli Sadik, and produced by Fazlur Rashid Dhali with the lead roles played by Alamgir and Rozina.

== Plot ==
Industrialist Ishak Ahmed and his wife Flora visit Nepal with their only daughter Dola. There Dola meets a Bangladesh young guide named Sagar. They fall in love and get married without the permission of her father and they become parents of a baby girl, Dolna.

== Cast ==
- Alamgir - Sagar
- Rozina - Dola
- Khalil Ullah Khan - Ishak Ahmed
- Roji Afsari - Flora
- ATM Shamsujjaman - Bandhu
- Dildar - Golam Gius
- Maya Hajarika - Sagar's mother
- Baby Joya - Dolna

== Reception ==
According to Sheikh Arif Bulbon, writing in The New Nation, the song "Tumi Je Aamar Koto Chena Seki Janona", lyrics by Moniruzzaman Monir, music composed by Alam Khan, and sung by Sabina Yasmin and Andrew Kishore, remains popular more than three decades later.

== Awards ==
The film received four national film (Bangladesh) awards. Shibli Sadik won for Best Screenplay, Mofizul Haque for Best Sound Editing, and Baby Jaya won a special award in the child artist category.
