= Meghmallar =

2014 film

- Film poster
- Bengali: মেঘমল্লার
- Directed by: Zahidur Rahim Anjan
- Screenplay by: Zahidur Rahim Anjan
- Story by: Akhtaruzzaman Elias
- Produced by: Abul Khair
- Starring: Shahiduzzaman Selim; Aparna Ghosh; Jayanta Chattopadhyay
- Cinematography: Sudheer Palsane
- Edited by: Sameer Ahmed
- Music by: Abhijit Basu
- Distributed by: Bengal Entertainment Ltd.
- Release date: 12 December 2014
- Running time: 92 minutes
- Country: Bangladesh
- Language: Bengali

Meghmallar (Bengali: মেঘমল্লার, also known in English as Raincoat) is a 2014 Bangladeshi drama film directed by Zahidur Rahim Anjan. The film is an adaption of writer Akhtaruzzaman Elias's story titled "Raincoat". It was screened in the Discovery section of the 2015 Toronto International Film Festival. It was screened at 51st International Film Festival of India in January 2021 in the Country in Focus section.

== Plot ==
An ordinary family of a chemistry teacher at a suburban government college, Nurul Huda, his wife Asma, daughter Sudha and Asma's brother Mintu goes through a life-altering experience during the Liberation War of Bangladesh in 1971. It happens when Mintu leaves to join the Freedom Fighters one morning. Asma secretly continues to correspond with her brother. One rainy day, Nurul goes to a school function wearing Mintu's raincoat to protect him from the ceaseless rains. Government forcefully arrests him on suspicion of being a rebel and takes him into custody. Nurul is then forced to make a decision that will affect both the destiny of his family and the whole country.

== Cast ==
- Shahiduzzaman Selim as Nurul Huda, a chemistry teacher at a suburban government college
- Aparna Ghosh as Asma, Nurul Huda's wife
- Jayanta Chattopadhyay as Mintu, Asma's brother
- Marjan Hossain Zara as Sudha, Nurul Huda and Asma's daughter
- Mostafiz Shahin as Pakistani Military Personnel
- Adnan Sobhan Evan as Pakistani Military Personnel

== Production ==
This film was made under the banner of Bengal Creations Ltd. The music for the film is directed by Abhijit Basu from Kolkata (India). N Rashed Chowdhury was the executive producer.
