= Azad Rahman =

Bangladeshi composer (1944–2020)

- Born: 1 January 1944; Bardhaman, Bengal Presidency, British India
- Died: 16 May 2020 (aged 76)
- Occupation: Composer
- Spouse: Selina Azad

Azad Rahman (1 January 1944 – 16 May 2020) was a Bangladeshi composer. He won Bangladesh National Film Award for Best Music Director twice and Best Male Playback Singer once for his performance in the films Jadur Bashi (1977) and Chandabaz (1993). He received a gold medal in 2011 from Rabindra Bharati University in Kolkata.

== Background ==
Rahman was born to Khalilur Rahman and Ashrafa Khatun in Bardhaman in the then British India. He was trained in classical music by Sangeetacharya Tarapada Chakraborty, the founder of Kotali Gharana which originates from Kotalipara Upazila, Faridpur, Bangladesh.

== Career ==
Rahman joined Radio Pakistan (Dhaka Centre) in the mid-1960s and was appointed the first executive director of the (now defunct) National Academy of Performing Arts, was a principal of the Government Music College, and served as the director general of the Bangladesh Shilpakala Academy for two terms. He provided music for films, radio and TV productions.

As a music director, Rahman set tunes to various songs for Bengali language films both in West Bengal and Bangladesh. His first movie as a music director was the 1967 Indian film Miss Priyambada. He made his own debut movie Goon Kotha and sang songs including Dora Kata Dagh Dekhe Bagh Kena Jay, and Bhaobashar mullo koto. He gave tunes to the patriotic song of Bangladesh Jonmo Amar Dhonno Holo Maago sung by Firoza Begum and later by Sabina Yasmin. He was a pianist, performing Indian classical ragas in his piano and traveling the world.

Rahman was one of the pioneers of Bangla Kheyal and wrote lyrics for many raagas. These have been performed on BTV in the Dhrupodi program. He produced the first Bangla Kheyal LP in the 1980s and has also composed and sung Bangla qawwalis. He also played Hindustani raagas on the piano and released as an LP.

Rahman was the founder chairman of Sanskriti Kendra—Centre for Education, Creative and Performing Arts. This center has organized several international music festivals in Dhaka with participants from different countries. He was also on the faculty of Stamford University, Dhaka.

== Personal life ==
Rahman was married to Selina Azad, a singer. Together they had three daughters.
