= Maya: The Lost Mother =

2019 film by Masud Pathik

- Poster
- Directed by: Masud Pathik
- Written by: Masud Pathik
- Based on: Naari by Shahabuddin Ahmed; Juddho Shishu by Kamal Ahmed
- Produced by: Bangladesh Government
- Starring: Mumtaz Sorcar; Jyotika Jyoti; Pran Roy; Devasish Kaiser
- Cinematography: Komol Chandra Das
- Edited by: Junaid Halim Rashaduzzaman Shohag
- Music by: Belal Khan
- Production company: Bratyo Creation
- Distributed by: Bratyo Chalachitra, Bratyo Creation
- Release date: December 27, 2019
- Running time: 123 minutes
- Country: Bangladesh
- Language: Bengali

Maya: The Lost Mother is a 2019 Bangladeshi war drama film. The film was written and directed by Masud Pathik and produced by Information Ministry of Bangladesh Government. It features Mumtaz Sorcar, Pran Roy, Jyotika Jyoti and Debashish Kaiser in the lead roles. The film was released on December 27, 2019. The film also premiered on 18th Dhaka International Film Festival.

== Cast ==
- Devasish Kaiser
- Mumtaz Sorcar
- Jyotika Jyoti
- Pran Roy
- Nargis Aktar
- Syed Hasan Imam
- Lina Ferdousi
- Jhuna Chowdhury
- Aslam Sunny
- Dr. Shahadat Hossain Nipu

== Marketing and Release ==
The official trailer of the film was released on November 20, 2019. The film was released in 5 theatres on December 27, 2019.

== Awards ==
The film won 44th Bangladesh National Film Awards - 2019 in a maximum of eight categories.
