= Chandranath =

Chandranath চন্দ্রনাথ
- Poster
- Directed by: Chashi Nazrul Islam
- Produced by: AKM Jahangir Khan
- Starring: Abdur Razzak; Shuchanda; Doyel; Golam Mustafa
- Music by: Khandaker Nurul Alam
- Release date: 1984
- Country: Bangladesh
- Language: Bengali language

Chandranath (Bengali: চন্দ্রনাথ) is a 1984 Bangladeshi film directed by Chashi Nazrul Islam. This was the adaptation of the novel of Sarat Chandra Chattopadhyay by the same title. It stars Abdur Razzak, Shuchanda, Doyel and Golam Mustafa in the lead.

== Cast ==
- Abdur Razzak
- Shuchanda
- Doyel
- Golam Mustafa
- Sirajul Islam
- Tapash Chowdhury
- Baby Notun

== Soundtrack ==
The music of this film is directed by Nurul Islam and lyrics were penned by Mohammad Moniruzzaman. Sabina Yasmin, Subir Nandi, Probal Chowdhury sang for this film.

- Phooler Bashor Bhanglo Jokhon - Probal Chowdhury
- "Prem Muroti Ghana Shyam" - Sabina Yasmin
- "Ei Chokher Lojja" - Sabina Yasmin
- "Ei Hridoye Eto Je Kothar Kapon" - Sabina Yasmin
- "Mayar Badhon Chhere Chole Jaay" - Subir Nandi

== Awards ==
National Film Award

Category	Awardee	Result
Best Actor	Abdur Razzak	Won
Best Supporting Actor	Sirajul Islam	Won
Best Music Director	Khandaker Nurul Alam	Won
Best Female Playback Singer	Sabina Yasmin	Won
