= No Dorai =

2019 Bangladeshi drama film

- Film Poster
- ন ডরাই
- Directed by: Taneem Rahman Angshu
- Screenplay by: Shyamal Sengupta; Mahboob Rahman
- Starring: Sariful Razz; Sunerah Binte Kamal; Nasir Uddin Khan
- Cinematography: Sumon Sarker
- Release date: 29 November 2019
- Running time: 150 min
- Country: Bangladesh
- Languages: Bengali; Chittagonian

No Dorai (Bengali: ন ডরাই) is a 2019 Bangladeshi drama film directed by Taneem Rahman Angshu. Set in Cox's Bazar, the story of No Dorai is based on the life of a young Bangladeshi girl, who defies society's norms to follow her dream of becoming a surfer. It is the first Bangladeshi surfing film. No Dorai literally means "not afraid" in Chittagonian dialect. It features Sunerah Binte Kamal and Sariful Razz in lead roles.

The film is Star Cineplex’s first venture into film production. Prior to the release of the film, its soundtrack Jontrona sung by Mohon Sharif created hype about the film. Star Cineplex’s No Dorai and Faridur Reza Sagar's Fagun Haway have jointly won the Bangladesh National Film Award for Best Film of 2019.

== Cast ==
The film features mostly new actors and actresses.

- Sunerah Binte Kamal as Ayesha.
- Sariful Razz as Sohel.
- Wasim Sitar as Liakot.
- Josefine Lindegaard as Esther.
- Tommy Hindley as Mark.
- Nasir Uddin Khan as Ayesha's Husband
- Lenka Vomocilova as Cynthia

== Plot ==
Small beach town resident Ayesha confronts social and familial oppositions to surf. She and Sohel, her best friend, are trained by a self-made surfer named Amir. Their unusual surfing enthusiasm gets international attention from various surfing communities and documentary filmmakers which in turn brings fund money along with jealousy, squabbles and power tussles. Sohel finds fame and glory through surfing. However, Ayesha's 'prohibited love' for it brings forced marriage and a life of misery to her. After his luxurious and reckless lifestyle in Dhaka, a derailed Sohel returns to Cox's Bazar where their mutual love for surfing reunites the two friends and brings new hope for surfing in the small beach town.

== Reception ==
Despite the hype created prior to its release, No Dorai received negative critical reception. The film has been praised for its beautiful visual of Cox's Bazar and performance of newcomer cast. But the story has not been critically well received.

== Awards ==
Bangladesh National Film Award for Best Film of 2019. National Film Award for Best Actress of 2019 for Sunerah Binte Kamal.
