= Putro (film) =

Bangladeshi film

- Directed by: Saiful Islam Mannu
- Screenplay by: Saiful Islam Mannu
- Produced by: Department of Films and Publications, Ministry of Information
- Starring: Ferdous Ahmed; Jaya Ahsan; Azizul Hakim; Dilara Zaman
- Edited by: Tarik Hossain Bidyut Rashaduzzaman Shohag
- Music by: Zulfiqer Russell
- Release date: 5 January 2018
- Country: Bangladesh
- Language: Bengali

Putro (transl. Son) is a 2018 Bangladeshi film. Saiful Islam Mannu directed the film under the supervision of Impress Telefilm Limited. The film won 11 awards, including the awards for Best Film and Best Actor at the 43rd Bangladesh National Film Awards.

== Plot ==
The film explores the social stigma surrounding autism.

== Cast ==
- Ferdous Ahmed
- Jaya Ahsan
- Azizul Hakim
- Dilara Zaman
- Shams Sumon

Guest Appearance

- Samina Chowdhury
- Mehreen
- Bappa Mazumder

== Music ==
The music of the film was composed by Zulfiqer Russell. The singers were Sabina Yasmin, Samina Chowdhury, Bappa Mazumder, Mehreen, Naimul Islam Ratul.

== Awards ==
Award Title	Category	Awardee	Result
National Film Awards	Best Film		Won
National Film Awards	Best Actor	Ferdous Ahmed	Won
National Film Awards	Best Child Artist	Fahim Muhtasim Lazim	Won
National Film Awards	Best Male Playback Singer	Naimul Islam Ratul	Won
National Film Awards	Best Female Playback Singer	Sabina Yasmin	Won
National Film Awards	Best Music Composer	Zulfiqer Russell	Won
National Film Awards	Best Screenplay	Saiful Islam Mannu	Won
National Film Awards	Best Dialogue	SM Haroon-or-Rashid	Won
National Film Awards	Best Editing	Tarik Hossain Bidyut	Won
National Film Awards	Best Sound Recording	Azam Babu	Won
National Film Awards	Best Costume Design	Sadia Shabnam Shantu	Won
