= Nekabborer Mohaproyan =

- Film poster
- Bengali: নেকাব্বরের মহাপ্রয়াণ
- Directed by: Masud Pathik
- Based on: Poetry by Nirmalendu Goon
- Starring: Jewel Jahur; Shimla; Affan Mitul; Prabir Mitra; Mamunur Rashid; Syed Muhammad Zubayer
- Music by: Sayeem Rana
- Release date: June 20, 2014
- Country: Bangladesh
- Language: Bengali

Nekabborer Mohaproyan is a 2014 Bangladeshi film directed and produced by Masud Pathik. The screenplay is based on the poetry of Nirmalendu Goon. It earned six Bangladesh National Film Awards including the Best Film. The film received financial aid from the government.

== Cast ==
- Prabir Mitra
- Shimla
- Mamunur Rashid
- Affan Mitul

== Awards ==
=== Bangladesh National Film Awards ===
- Best Film
- Best Female Playback Singer
- Best Songwriter
- Best Music Composer
- Best Lyricist
- Best Makeup Man
