= 33rd Bangladesh National Film Awards =

National Film Awards, Bangladesh

- Awarded for: Best of bangladeshi cinema in 2008
- Awarded by: President of Bangladesh
- Presented by: Ministry of Information
- Presented on: February 11, 2010
- Site: Dhaka, Bangladesh
- Official website: moi.gov.bd

Highlights
- Best Feature Film: Chandragrohon
- Best Actor: Riaz; Ki Jadu Korila
- Best Actress: Sadika Parvin Popy; Megher Kole Rod
- Most awards: Chandragrohon (8)
- Most nominations: Chandragrohon (11)

The 33rd National Film Awards were presented by the Ministry of Information, Bangladesh, to felicitate the best of Bangladeshi cinema released in the year 2008. The government announced the names of 24 artists in 23 categories for the National Film Award in recognition of their outstanding contributions to the country's film industry. An eleven-member jury board prepared a list of 15 films that could be awarded out of 17 films on January 4, 2010.

== List of winners ==
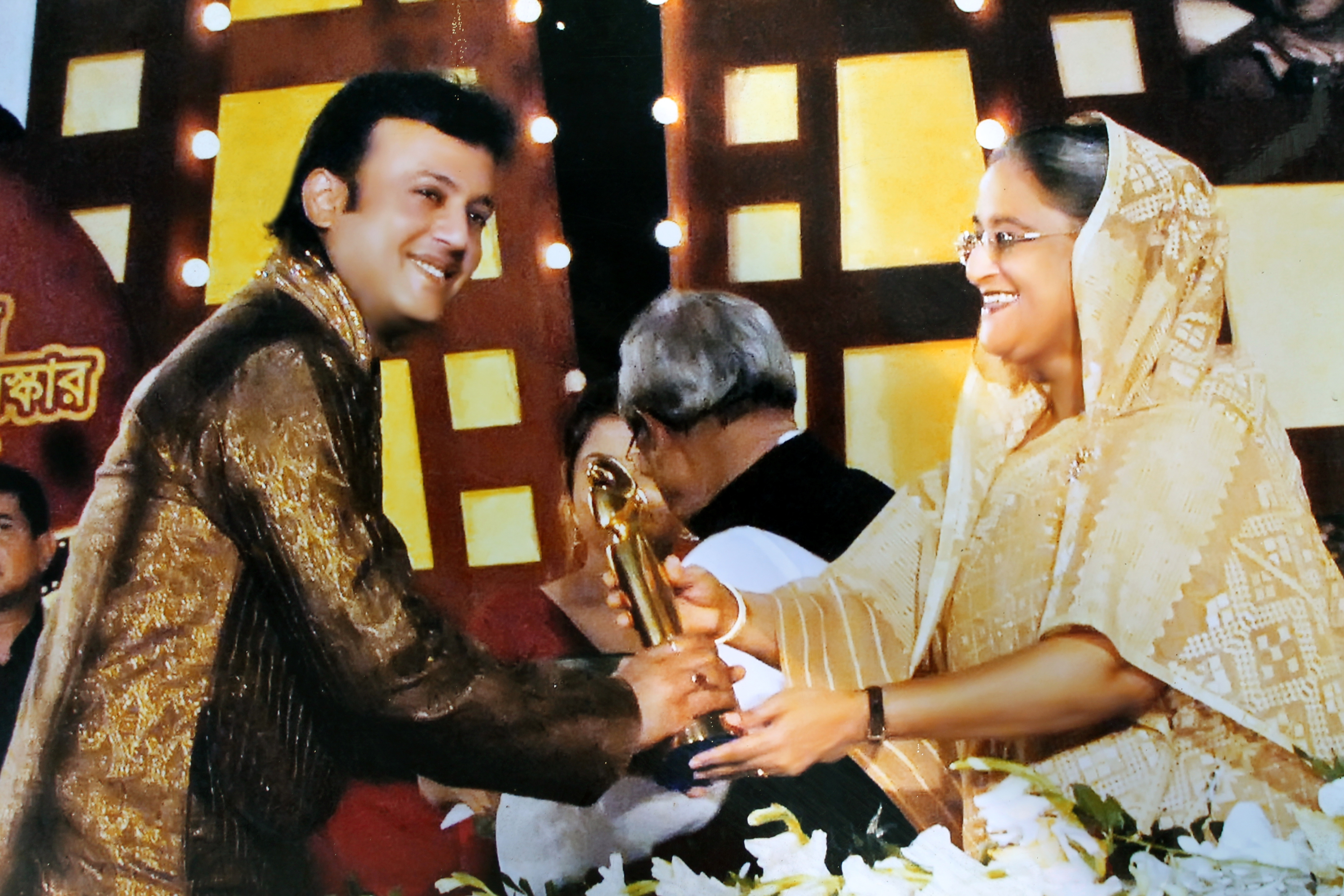
Riaz taking National Film Awards from Prime Minister Sheikh Hasina in 2010

A total of 24 awards were given this year.

=== Merit awards ===
Name of Awards	Winner(s)	Film
Best Film	Faridur Reza Sagar (Impress Telefilm Limited)	Chandragrohon
Best Director	Murad Parvez	Chandragrohon
Best Actor	Riaz	Ki Jadu Korila
Best Actress	Sadika Parvin Popy	Megher Kole Rod
Best Actor in a Supporting Role	Shams Sumon	Sopnopuron
Best Actress in a Supporting Role	Dilara Zaman and Champa	Chandragrohon
Best Actor in a Negative Role	Zahir Uddin Piar	Chandragrohon
Best Child Artist	Prarthana Fardin Dighi	Ek Takar Bou
Best Music Director	Emon Saha	Chandragrohon
Best Music Composer	Alam Khan	Ki Jadu Korila
Best Lyrics	Kabir Bakul	Megher Kole Rod
Best Male Playback Singer	Andrew Kishore	Ki Jadu Korila
Best Female Playback Singer	Kanak Chapa	Ek Takar Bou

=== Technical awards ===
Name of Awards	Winner(s)	Film
Best Story	Mohammad Rafiquzzaman	Megher Kole Rod
Best Dialogue	Murad Parvez	Chandragrohon
Best Screenplay	Murad Parvez	Chandragrohon
Best Choreography	Masum Babul	Ki Jadu Korila
Best Art Direction	Mohammad Kalantor	Megher Kole Rod
Best Editing	Mohammad Shahidul Haque	Ki Jadu Korila
Best Cinematography	Mahfuzur Rahman Khan	Amar Ache Jol
Best Sound Recording	Rezaul Karim Badal	Ki Jadu Korila
Best Costume Design	Mohammad Shamsul Islam	Megher Kole Rod
Best Makeup	Mohammad Shamsul Islam	Megher Kole Rod

=== Special awards ===
- Best Child Artist (Special) - Mrida Wafsar Nawar Wafa (Amar Ache Jol)

== See also ==
- Bachsas Film Awards
- Meril Prothom Alo Awards
- Ifad Film Club Award
- Babisas Award
