= 41st Bangladesh National Film Awards =

National Film Awards, Bangladesh

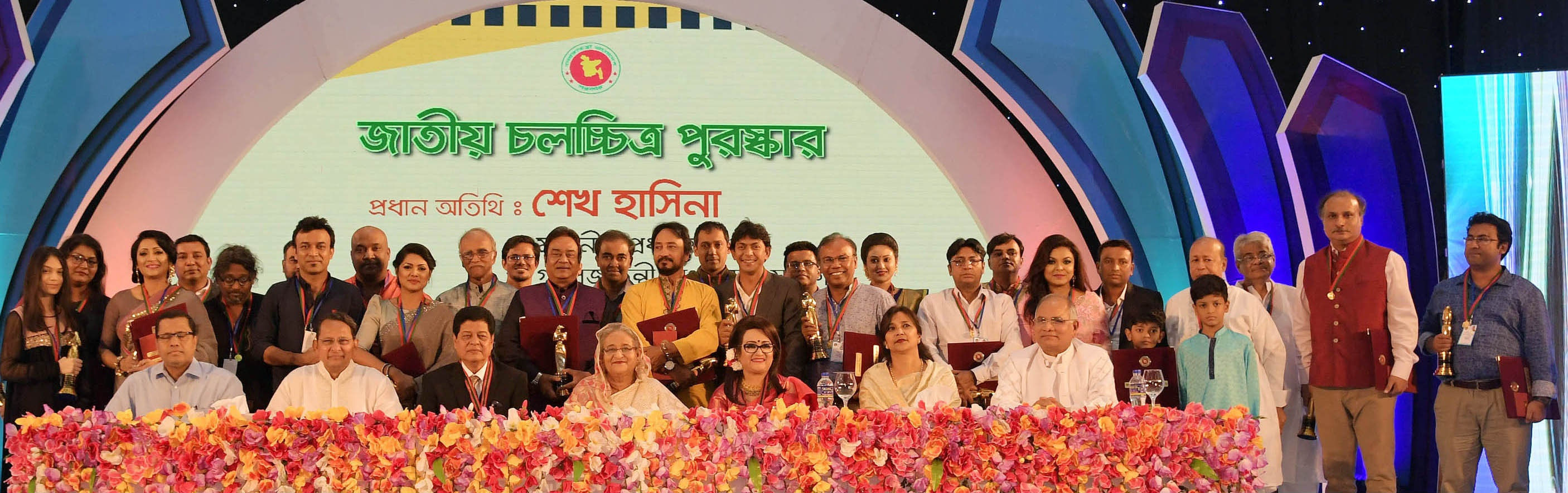
- Award ceremony held on 8 July 2018
- Awarded for: Best of Bangladeshi cinema in 2016
- Awarded by: President of Bangladesh
- Presented by: Ministry of Information
- Announced on: 4 April 2018
- Presented on: 8 July 2018
- Site: Dhaka, Bangladesh
- Official website: www.moi.gov.bd

Highlights
- Best Feature Film: Oggatonama
- Best Actor: Chanchal Chowdhury; Aynabaji
- Best Actress: Nusrat Imrose Tisha and Kusum Sikder; Ostitto and Shankhachil
- Lifetime achievement: Bobita and Farooque
- Most awards: Aynabaji (7)

The 41st National Film Awards was presented on 8 July 2018 by the Ministry of Information, Bangladesh to felicitate the best of Bangladeshi films released in the calendar year 2016.

== List of winners ==
Name of Awards	Winner(s)	Film
Lifetime Achievement Award	Bobita and Farooque	
Best Film	Faridur Reza Sagar	Oggatonama
Best Director	Amitabh Reza Chowdhury	Aynabaji
Best Actor	Chanchal Chowdhury	Aynabaji
Best Actress	Nusrat Imrose Tisha; Kusum Sikder	Ostitto; Shankhachil
Best Actor in a Supporting Role	Ali Raj; Fazlur Rahman Babu	Pure Jay Mon; Meyeti Ekhon Kothay Jabe
Best Actress in a Supporting Role	Tania Ahmed	Krishnopokkho
Best Actor in a Negative Role	Shahiduzzaman Selim	Oggatonama
Best Child Artist	Anum Rahman Khan (Sajbati)	Shankhachil
Best Music Director	Emon Saha	Meyeti Ekhon Kothay Jabe
Best Music Composer	Emon Saha	Meyeti Ekhon Kothay Jabe
Best Lyricist	Gazi Mazharul Anwar	Meyeti Ekhon Kothay Jabe
Best Male Playback Singer	Wakil Ahmed	Darpan Bisorjon
Best Female Playback Singer	Meher Afroz Shaon	Krishnopokkho
Best Story	Tauquir Ahmed	Oggatonama
Best Dialogue	Rubaiyat Hossain	Under Construction
Best Screenplay	Anam Biswas; Gaosul Alam	Aynabaji
Best Cinematography	Rashed Zaman	Aynabaji
Best Art Direction	Uttam Guho	Shankhachil
Best Editing	Iqbal Ahsanul Karim	Aynabaji
Best Sound Recording	Ripon Nath	Aynabaji
Best Costume Design	Sattar; Farzana Sun	Niyoti; Aynabaji
Best Make-up	Manik	Under Construction
