= 46th Bangladesh National Film Awards =

National Film Awards, Bangladesh

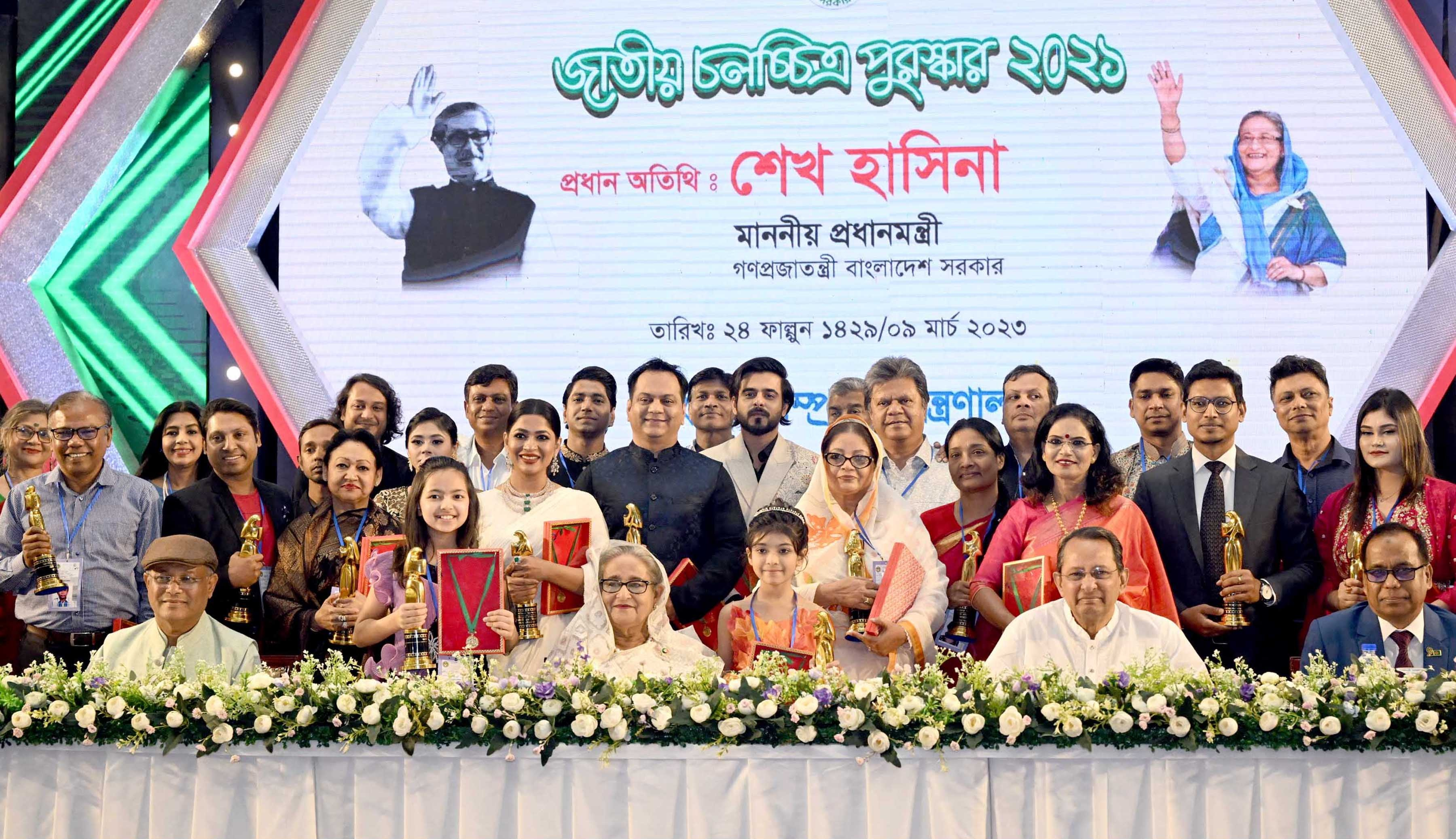
- Award ceremony held on 9 March 2023
- Awarded for: Best of Bangladeshi cinema in 2021
- Awarded by: President of Bangladesh
- Presented by: Ministry of Information
- Announced on: 6 January 2023
- Presented on: 9 March 2023

Highlights
- Best Feature Film: Laal Moroger Jhuti; Nonajoler Kabbo
- Best Actor: Siam Ahmed and Mir Sabbir
- Best Actress: Azmeri Haque Badhon and Tasnova Tamanna
- Lifetime achievement: Dolly Zahur; Ilias Kanchan
- Most awards: Nonajoler Kabbo (7)

The 46th National Film Awards was presented by the Ministry of Information, Bangladesh, to felicitate the best of Bangladeshi films released in the calendar year 2021. The winners were declared on 6 January 2023 and the awards presented on 9 March.

== Jury board and submissions ==
On 16 August 2022, the ministry formed a 13-member jury board. Jury members included Morshedul Islam, Zahid Hasan, Bhorer Kagoj, Maksud Jamil Mintu, Salma Begum Sujata, and others. 21 feature films, 17 short films and 7 documentary films released in 2021 were submitted for the National Film Awards.

== Lifetime Achievement ==
Award	Winner(s)	Awarded As
Lifetime Achievement	Dolly Zahur	Actor
Lifetime Achievement	Ilias Kanchan	Actor

== List of winners ==
Award	Winner(s)	Film
Best Film	Matia Banu Shuku; Rezwan Shahriar Sumit	Laal Moroger Jhuti; Nonajoler Kabbo
Best Short Film	Reza Galib	Dhar
Best Documentary Film	Kawsar Chowdhury	Boddhyo Bhumi
Best Director	Rezwan Shahriar Sumit	Nonajoler Kabbo
Best Actor	Siam Ahmed; Mir Sabbir	Mridha Bonam Mridha; Raat Jaga Phool
Best Actress	Azmeri Haque Badhon; Tasnova Tamanna	Rehana Maryam Noor; Nonajoler Kabbo
Best Supporting Actor	Fazlur Rahman Babu	Nonajoler Kabbo
Best Supporting Actress	Shampa Reza	Padmapuran
Best Actor/Actress in Negative Role	Joyraj	Laal Moroger Jhuti
Best Actor/Actress in Comedy Role	Milon Bhattacharya	Mridha Bonam Mridha
Best Child Artist	Afia Tabassum	Rehana Maryam Noor
Best Child Artist in Special Category	Jannatul Mawa	Ja Hariye Jay
Best Music Director	Shujeo Shyam	Joiboti Konnyar Mon
Best Dance Director	None	None
Best Male Playback Singer	Muhin	Padmapuran
Best Female Playback Singer	Chandana Mazumdar	Padmapuran
Best Lyrics	Gazi Mazharul Anwar	Joiboti Konnar Mon
Best Music Composer	Shujeo Shyam	Joiboti Konnar Mon
Best Story	Rezwan Shahriar Sumit	Nonajoler Kabbo
Best Screenplay	Nurul Alam Atique	Laal Moroger Jhuti
Best Dialogue	Tauquir Ahmed	Sphulingo
Best Editing	Samir Ahmed	Laal Moroger Jhuti
Best Art Direction	Shihab Nurun Nabi	Nonajoler Kabbo
Best Cinematography	Syed Kashef Shahbazi, Sumon Sarker, and Mazharul Razu	Laal Moroger Jhuti
Best Sound Recording	Sayba Talukder	Rehana Maryam Noor
Best Costume Design	Edila Farid Turin	Nonajoler Kabbo
Best Makeup	Md Farukh, Md Farhad, and Reza Milon	Laal Moroger Jhuti
