= Ehsanul Haque Babu =

Bangladeshi film producer

- এহসানুল হক বাবু
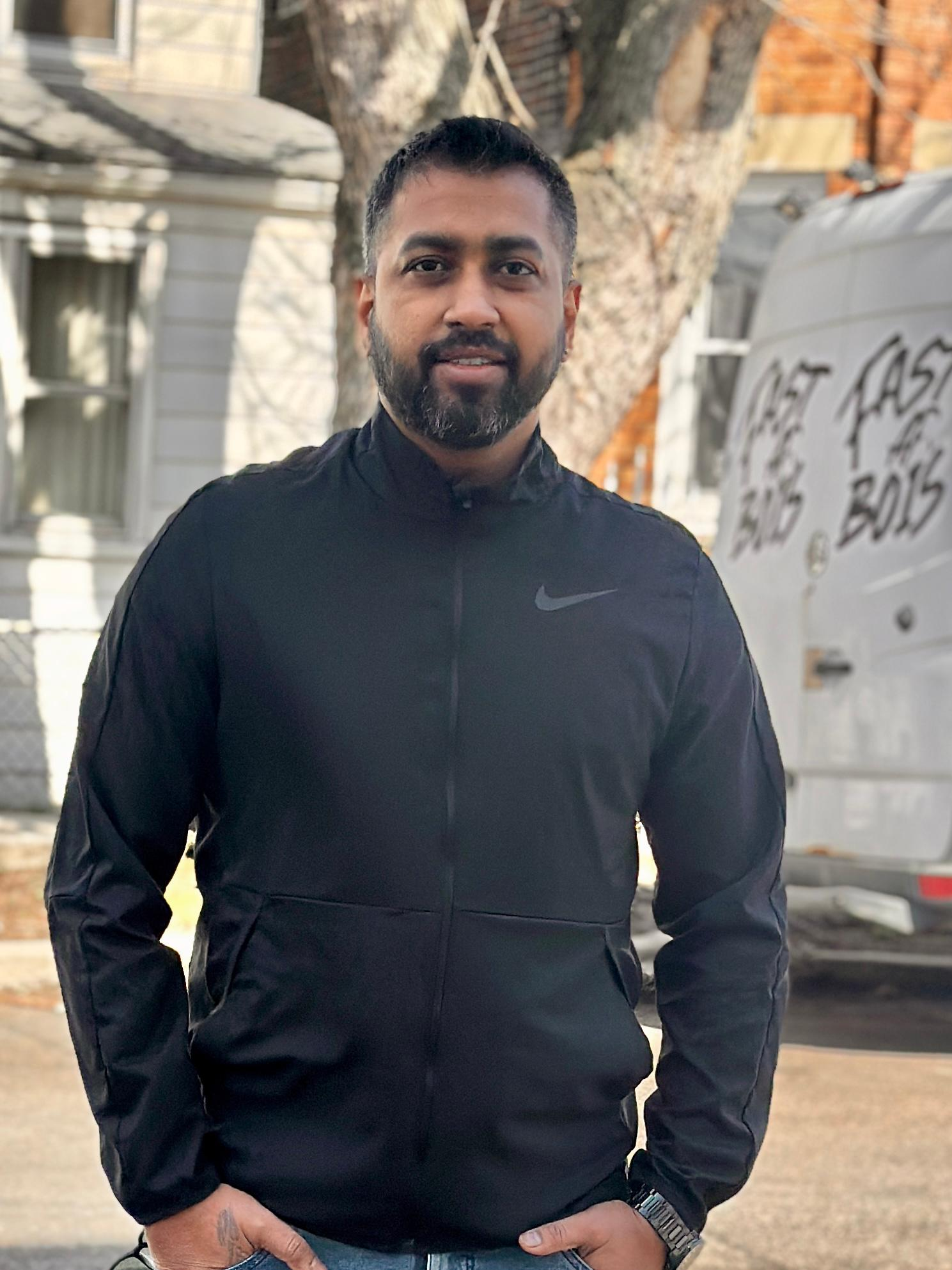
- Born: Dhaka, Bangladesh
- Occupation: Producer
- Notable work: Rehana Maryam Noor; Live from Dhaka

Ehsanul Haque Babu is a Bangladeshi film producer known for his contributions to the country's cinema industry. He gained prominence for producing the film Rehana Maryam Noor (2021), which became the first Bangladeshi film to be officially selected for the Cannes Film Festival under the Un Certain Regard section.

== Career ==
Ehsanul Haque Babu has been actively involved in the Bangladeshi film industry, working on projects that have received both national and international recognition. He produced Rehana Maryam Noor, directed by Abdullah Mohammad Saad, which gained critical acclaim and was described by Indian filmmaker Anurag Kashyap as one of the most powerful films from South Asia, with a strong focus on the central character and its themes.

The film had its world premiere at the Cannes Film Festival in 2021.

Besides Rehana Maryam Noor (2021), he has worked as a producer on other Bangladeshi films, including Live from Dhaka (2016) and Refugee (2022).

In 2026, Babu produced the series ANNiE, which was selected for its world premiere in the Spotlight: Women in Series section of the Seriencamp Festival in Cologne, Germany.

In the advertising industry, Haque has produced over 500 commercials for global brands such as Huawei, Samsung, and Nestlé, as well as national companies like Grameenphone and Bashundhara Group.

== Awards and recognition ==
His contributions to Bangladeshi cinema have been acknowledged through several awards. In 2023, Ehsanul Haque Babu was awarded the BABISAS Award for Best Producer. The film Rehana Maryam Noor was critically acclaimed and screened at several international film festivals. It received international awards, including Best Feature Film at the Cinema Jove Valencia International Film Festival and the South Asian Film Festival of Montreal in 2023. His debut feature, Live from Dhaka (2016), received Best Director and Best Actor awards at the Singapore International Film Festival. The film was also featured at a range of international festivals, including Rotterdam, Locarno, and Jeonju. Additionally, Live from Dhaka won 'Best Film' in the Critics' Choice (Film) category at the Meril-Prothom Alo Awards in 2019, along with several other accolades for its cast and crew.

== Works ==
=== Films ===
- Rehana Maryam Noor (2021)
- Live from Dhaka (2016)

=== Television dramas ===
- Golpota Shesh Hoye Gelo
- Bukher Vitor Kichu Pathor Thaka Valo

=== Web films ===
- Refugee
- Koli 2.0
- ANNiE

=== Documentaries ===
- Bir Shrestha Ruhul Amin
- Shaheed Muazzem Hossain
