= Ashna Habib Bhabna =

Bangladeshi actress

- আশনা হাবিব ভাবনা
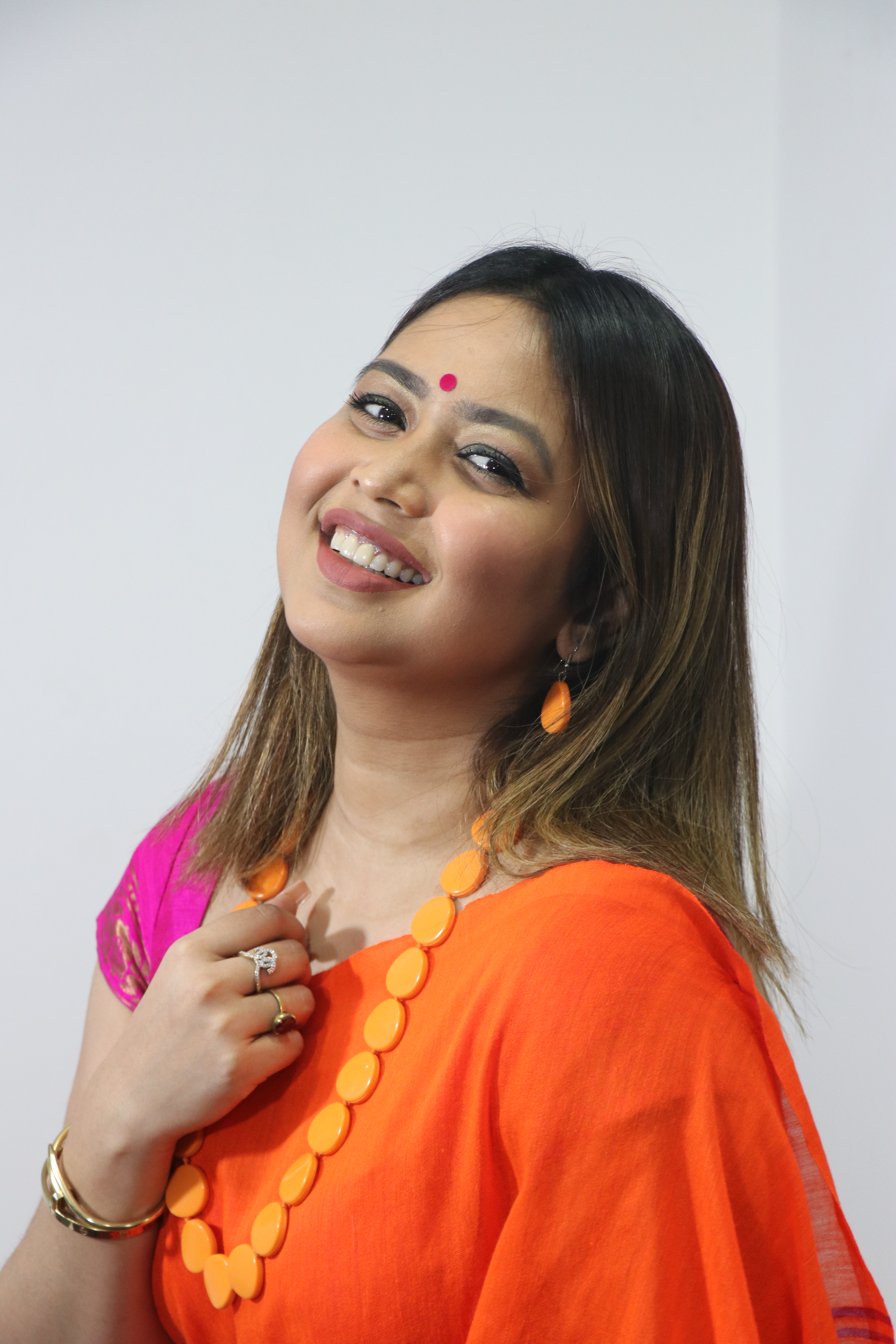
- Born: August 3, 1994 (age 32)
- Occupation: Actress
- Years active: 2006–present
- Height: 5 ft 4 in (1.63 m)
- Father: Habibul Islam Habib

Ashna Habib Bhabna (born 3 August 1994), better known as Bhabna, is a Bangladeshi actress who works in Bengali television dramas and films. She is cited in the media as one of the most popular faces of Bangladeshi cinema.

== Early life ==
Bhabna's father, Habibul Islam Habib, is a film director. As of 2022, she is working under him in a production titled Japito Jibon.

== Career ==
Bhabna made her TV debut with the 2015 series Not Out. Later, she entered films with Animesh Aich's Voyongkor Sundor (2017), opposite Parambrata Chatterjee. She has worked in multiple dramas and has also starred in the Liberation War film Laal Moroger Jhuti (2021) playing Padma.

At the Chorki Carnival 2023, Bhabna received a nomination under the Best Actor – Series category for her role in the TV series Overtrump, opposite Chanchal Chowdhury.

As of November 2023, Bhabna has starring roles in three upcoming films: Dampara, Japito Jibon, and Payel.

In April 2025, a murder case was filed against Mustafa and 16 other actors over the death of a protester in Vatara during the Anti-Discrimination Student Movement against the Awami League government led by Former Prime Minister Sheikh Hasina.

In April 2026, Bhabna attended the 48th Moscow International Film Festival in Russia for the first time with the film King in the Land of the Princess, directed by Asif Islam. The film was officially selected in the festival’s Artcore section, and Bhabna walked the red carpet with the cast and crew as part of the event.

== Personal life ==
Bhabna is Muslim. She feels that love and being loved is an essential for life, especially for an artist.

Bhabna revealed in 2023 that she has been subjected to religious policing and discrimination in the film industry over her relationship with Animesh Aich. In a 2026 interview with Prothom Alo, she stated that she was not in a romantic relationship and was not currently involved with anyone.

== Films ==
- Voyongkor Sundor (2017)
- Laal Moroger Jhuti (2021)
- Japito Jibon (2022)
- Dumpara (2023)
- Payel (2023)
- King in the Land of the Princess (2026)

== Television ==
- Not Out (2015)
- Overtrump (2023)
