= Binny Yanga =

Indian social worker

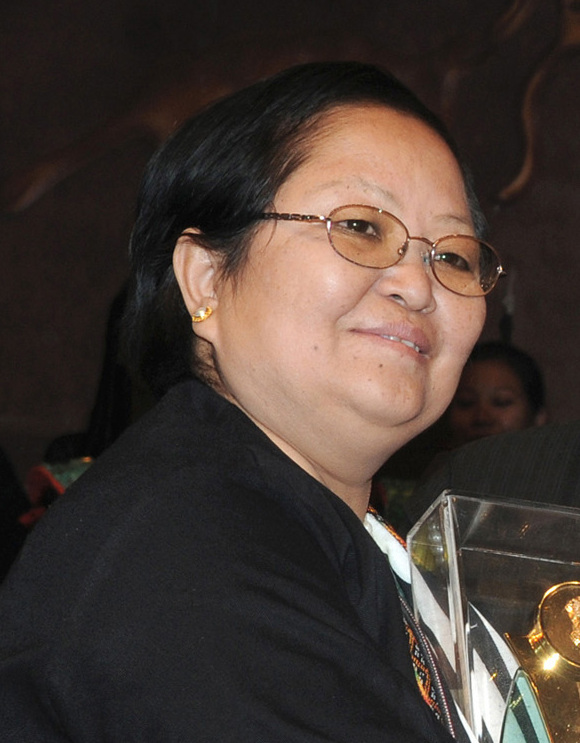
- Born: 7 July 1958; North-East Frontier Agency, India
- Died: 3 September 2015 (aged 57); Guwahati, India
- Occupation: Social worker
- Years active: 1979–2015
- Parent(s): Bini Jaipu; Bini Yanya
- Awards: Padma Shri; Dr. Durga Bai Deshmukh Award; COSIA Entrepreneur Award; NCDC Award; National Tribal Award; IFFCO Sahakarita Ratna Award; Eastern Panorama Achiever's Award

Binny Yanga (7 July 1958 – 3 September 2015) was an Indian social worker, a member of the National Planning Commission of India and the founder of Oju Welfare Association (OWA), a non governmental organization based in Arunachal Pradesh, working for the welfare of the weaker sections of the society and campaigning against social Illnesses such as child marriage, forced marriage and dowry. She was honored by the Government of India, in 2012, with the fourth highest Indian civilian award of Padma Shri.

== Biography ==
Binni Yanga was born on 7 July 1958 in the Indian state of Arunachal Pradesh to late Binni Jaipu, a former political assistant at Lower Subansiri district and Binni Yanya, known for her efforts for the revival of traditional handlooms, as the elder of their two daughters, the younger being Gumri Ringu, the incumbent chairman of Arunachal Pradesh State Commission for Women. She completed her education at Banasthali Vidyapith, Rajasthan and during her student days, she formed a girls' forum, All Subansiri District Girls Welfare Association. After her studies, she started her career as a teacher. During this period, she set up an adult education and nursery centre in 1979 and, later, a shelter home for destitute girls. In 1987, Yanga joined Arunachal Police Force, when the first batch of women officers were inducted in 1987. After only a year of service with the police force, she resigned in 1988 to enter social service on a full-time basis.

Binni Yanga was diagnosed with cervical cancer in 2007 but carried on with her activities. She lived in Naharlagun in Arunachal Pradesh and owned Oju Craft Centre, a small enterprise employing 200 workers. She died on 3 September 2015.

== Oju Welfare Association and social career ==
Binni Yanga registered the adult education and nursery centre she started in 1979 as a society in 1988, under the name Oju Welfare Association (OWA). The centre has grown over the years into an organization of larger proportions, covering a number of divisions, each catering to a specified purpose. OWA maintains a free educational institution in Seppa with a student strength of 100 boys and girls, a children's home, Shishu Greh, home to 150 orphaned children, Short Stay Home, a temporary place of residence with a capacity to house 45 destitute girls or women, a working women's hostel, a family counselling centre and a women's help line. They also run a girls' school, Kasturba Gandhi Balika Vidyalaya at Jang in Tawang district, a secondary school following CBSE syllabus and a vocational training centre. OWA also hosts the central government agencies, Jan Shiksha Sansthan and State Resource Centre in its premises.

Yanga organized social awareness campaigns and seminars on health and other issues and was also involved with the promotion of traditional crafts of India for which she founded Himgiri Multi-purpose Co-operative Society, a marketing agency for the rural artisans. The society has participated in many national and international exhibitions in countries such as UK, South Africa and Bhutan.

== Positions ==
Binni Yanga was a former member of the National Planning Commission of India and has held the chairs of the Jan Shikshan Sansthan, and Arunachal Pradesh State Resource Centre, both nodal agencies under the Ministry of Human Resource Development (India). She was a member of the executive committees of the National Literacy Mission Authority and the Khadi and Village Industries Commission. She also served as Arunachal Pradesh State Commission for Women, Tribal Cooperative Marketing Development Federation of India (TRIFED), (a Ministry of Tribal Affairs undertaking), the Indian Institute of Entrepreneurship, Guwahati and the District Rural Health Mission, Yupia, as a member. She was the secretary of Himgiri Multipurpose Cooperative Society Limited, Naharlagun and Arunachal Pradesh Women's Voluntary Association. She was also a member of Muskaan Society, Papum Pare Juvenile Justice Board, Rama Krishna Mission Hospital, Itanagar and Country Women Association of India. She also served in the executive committee of the Rashtriya Madhyamik Shiksha Abhiyan, Itanagar.

== Awards and recognitions ==
Binny Yanga received Dr. Durga Bai Deshmukh Award in 2000 followed by the COSIA Entrepreneur Award in 2009–2010 from the Chamber of Small Industry Associations. A recipient of the NCDC Award of cooperative Excellence, Yanga received the National Tribal Award and IFFCO Sahakarita Ratna Award in 2012. The same year, the Government of India awarded her the fourth highest Indian civilian award of Padma Shri. In 2013, she was awarded the 2013 Achiever's Award by Eastern Panorama magazine.

== See also ==
- National Planning Commission of India
- National Literacy Mission
- Khadi and Village Industries Commission
