= Ashish Khondokar =

Bangladeshi actor

- আশীষ খন্দকার
- Occupations: Artistic designer, translator, playwright, actor, director, and filmmaker

Ashish Khondokar is a Bangladeshi artistic designer, translator, playwright, actor, director, and filmmaker. He won Bangladesh National Film Award for Best Performance in a Negative Role for his role in the film Adventure of Sundarbans (2023).

== Background ==
Ashish Khondokar spent his childhood and adolescence in Gaibandha. After completing his SSC, he first enrolled into Gaibandha Government College but later earned his HSC from Dhaka College. He then admitted to Jahangirnagar University but, in 1991, he went to National School of Drama in New Delhi, India for theatre studies.

== Career ==
Khondokar got involved in theatre activities in the late 1970s. First, as a member of Dhaka Padatik he had acted in plays like Comrade, Ingit and Goni Mia Ekdin. While he was a student at National School of Drama, he got acquainted with different forms of world theatre. He was influenced by American artistic designer and theatre scholar, Richard Schechner's concept of environmental theatre. He returned to Bangladesh in 1991.

Khondokar wrote and directed the first environmental theatre production, Protno, which was staged in 1991. To initiate more environmental theatre experiments he formed his own theatre troupe named Space and Acting Research Centre, a member of Bangladesh Group Theatre Federation. His second project was Chandrabindu, a Bardhaman House (now Bangla Academy) based production. For his next production, Mohammad Amin, he used the pond at Institute of Fine Arts premise.

As an actor, Khondokar performed in several films including Haider (2021), Sultanpur (2023), Antonogor (2023) by Goutam Koiri, Jol Rong (2025), Noya Manush (2025). He acted in Adbhuture Boighor (2021), a children television drama serial.

Khondokar acted in the multiple award winning film Chaka - The Wheel (1993) directed by Morshedul Islam and based on a story by Selim Al Deen. He acted in short film Dhor (2021), directed by Reza Galib, which won Bangladesh National Film Award for Best Short Film at the 46th Bangladesh National Film Awards. His acted on a film Laal Moroger Jhuti (2021) which won six awards in the same ceremony. He won Bangladesh National Film Award for Best Performance in a Negative Role for his role Nosu Dakat, in the film Adventure of Sundarbans (2023) based on a story by Muhammad Zafar Iqbal.

Khondokar founded a children school, Friday Theatre School, sponsored by Alliance Française de Dhaka.
