= Shihab Nurun Nabi =

Bangladeshi art director and production designer

Shihab Nurun Nabi is a Bangladeshi art director and production designer known for his work in films, television commercials, and over-the-top (OTT) platforms. He received the National Film Award in 2021 for Best Art Direction for the film Nona Joler Kabbo.

== Career ==
Shihab Nurun Nabi began his career in art direction through a professional connection made during an event, where he was offered the opportunity to work on a television commercial. His first project involved designing a bank front desk set for a mobile operator advertisement, which received positive feedback and led to further opportunities. Following this, he joined Gao Productions and worked in art direction for television commercials for approximately two years. He later transitioned to freelance work, collaborating with several directors in the Bangladeshi advertising industry. Over time, Nabi contributed to nearly one thousand television commercials.

== Selected works ==
=== Films ===
- Nona Joler Kabbo
- Shonibar Bikel
- Matir Moyna
- Toofan
- Rickshaw Girl
- Fatima
- Taandob
- Chokkor
- Sincerely Yours, Dhaka
- Something Like an Autobiography

=== Short films ===
- Ali

=== Television, web series and OTT ===
- Mohanagar
- Mohanagar 2
- Kalpurush
- Black Money
- ANNiE

== Awards and recognition ==
Shihab Nurun Nabi received the National Film Award for Best Art Direction in 2021 for his work in Nona Joler Kabbo. The short film Ali, for which he served as production designer, received a Special Jury Mention at the Cannes Film Festival. He also received a BABISAS (Bangladesh Entertainment Journalist Association) Award for his contributions to art direction. He has been nominated for Best Art Direction at the Chorki Carnival for Something Like an Autobiography.
