= Zinat Sanu Swagata =

Bangladeshi actress

- জিনাত শানু স্বাগতা
- Born: 19 January
- Other names: স্বাগতা
- Occupations: Actress, presenter, musician
- Spouse: Rashed Zaman (m. 2015; div. 2022)
- Awards: Best Look at You Got The Look (ygtl) in 2005
- Website: www.swagata-artist.com

Zinat Sanu Swagata (Bengali: জিনাত শানু স্বাগতা); better known as Swagata is a Bangladeshi actress, presenter and musician.

== Biography ==
At the age of three and a half years, she entered into the world of acting as a child artist in Linza film. Then, as a child artist, in honor, Satiputra Abdullah and Top Mustaine films. Swagata commenced singing from early childhood. In the Notun Kuri competition, Swagata became first runner up. She completed study in film and media studies at Stamford University Bangladesh

== Criticism ==
Swagata took a stand for the government during the repression of the dictatorship Awami League government on the students in the quota reform movement that took place in 2024. During the movement, a group of pro-autocracy Awami artists, including Swagata, were active against the movement in a WhatsApp group called 'Alo Ashbei' led by actor Ferdous. After the non-cooperation movement, on September 3, 2024, some screenshots related to that WhatsApp group were spread on social media.

== Filmography ==
- Linza
- Somman
- Satiputra Abdullah
- Top Mastan
- Satru Satru khela
- Koti takar fokir
- Asanta Mon
- Dubshatar
- Phire Esho Behula
- Suchonā Rekhar dike
- Laal Moroger Jhuti (2021)
- Paap Punno (2022)
- Deyaler Desh (2024)

== Television appearances ==
1. Five Female Friend
2. Cirakumari sangha
3. Mahua
4. Ba te bondhur huṭopuṭi
5. Paanch Phoron

== Advertisements ==
- Pran Cola
- Cocola Noodles
- Standard Chartered Bank, Bangladesh
- Grameenphone
- Bizli Cable

== Award ==
- You Got The Look 2005

== Personal life ==
On 23 September 2017, Swagata married photographer Rashed Zaman. Rashed Zaman was involved in the filming of the film Aynabaji.
