= Tasnova Tamanna =

Bangladeshi actress

- তাসনুভা তামান্না
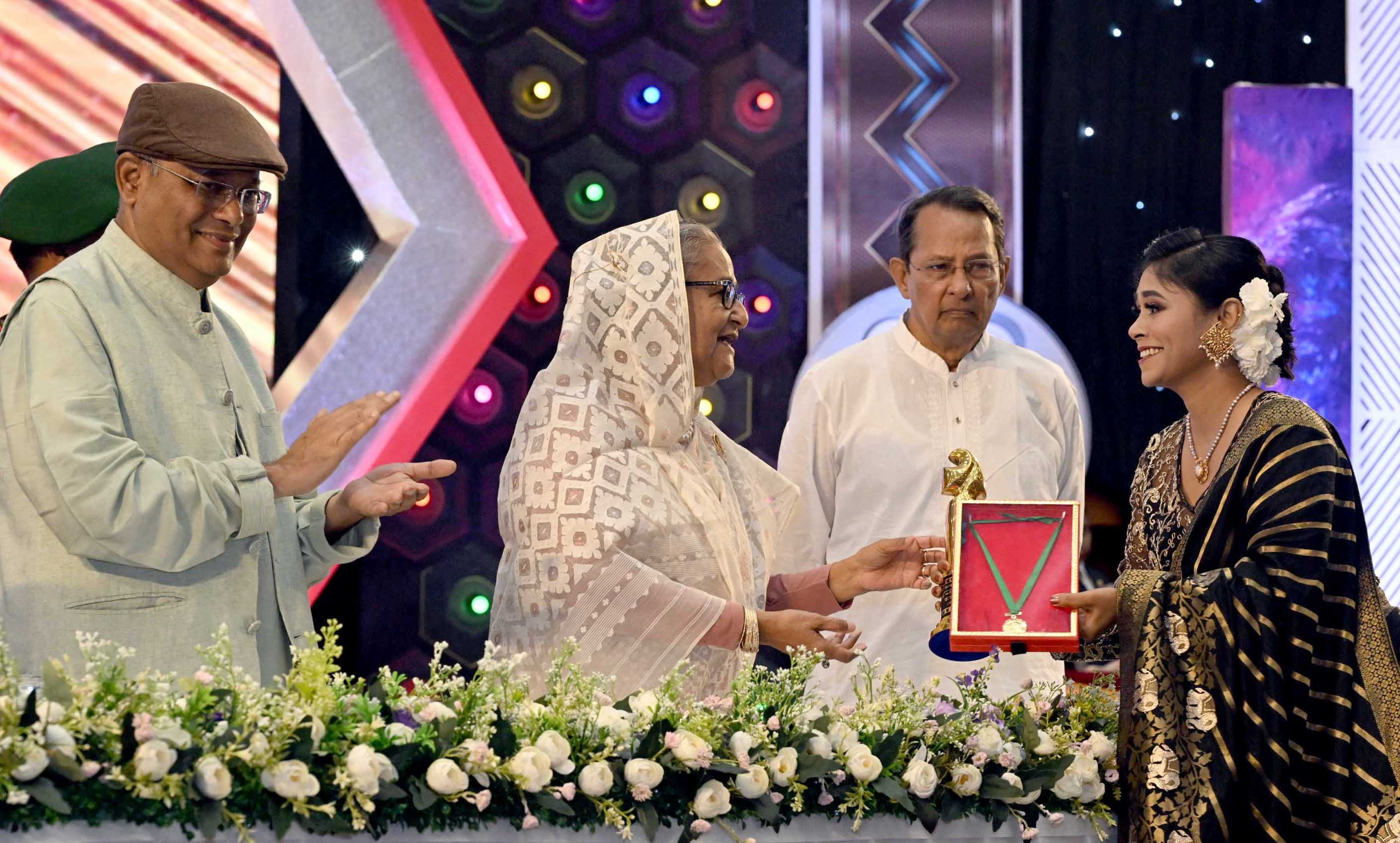
- Tamanna (rightmost) receives National Film Award 2021.

Tasnova Tamanna is a Bangladeshi actress. She won Bangladesh National Film Award for Best Actress for her role in the film Nonajoler Kabbo (2021).

== Filmography ==
Year	Title	Role	Director	Notes	Ref.
2016	Live from Dhaka	Rehana	Abdullah Mohammed Saad		
2021	Nonajoler Kabbo	Tuni	Rezwan Shahriar Sumit		
