= Mohammad Nazim Uddin =

Bangladeshi thriller writer, translator and publisher

- মোহাম্মদ নাজিম উদ্দিন
- Born: Dhaka, Bangladesh
- Education: Faculty of Fine Arts (attended); Department of Mass Communication and Journalism (postgraduate)
- Alma mater: University of Dhaka
- Occupations: Writer, publisher, translator
- Writing career
- Language: Bangla, English
- Notable works: Baig-Bastard series; Rabindranath Ekhane Kokhono Khete Asenni

Mohammad Nazim Uddin is a Bangladeshi writer, publisher, and translator, best known for his thriller novels written in Bangla. He initially gained recognition as a translator of popular English-language novels before establishing himself as an original fiction writer. His works have been widely read in Bangladesh and West Bengal, India, particularly the novel Rabindranath Ekhane Kokhono Khete Asenni.

== Early life and education ==
Nazim Uddin was born in Dhaka, Bangladesh. He studied at the Faculty of Fine Arts for one year before completing a postgraduate degree in Mass Communication and Journalism at the University of Dhaka. He later founded the publishing house Batighar Prakashani in Bangladesh.

== Literary career ==
=== Baig-Bastard series ===
1. Nemesis (2010)
2. Contract (2011)
3. Nexus (2012)
4. Confession (2013)
5. Karachi (2015)
6. Next (2022)
7. Control (2024)
8. Namesake (2026)

=== KS Khan and Rabindranath series ===
1. Jaal (Fake) (2013)
2. Rabindranath Ekhane Kokhono Khete Asenni (2015)
3. Rabindranath Ekhane Kokhono Asenni (2019)

=== Other novels ===
- 1952 – Nichok Kono Shonkha Noy (2014)
- Keu Keu Kotha Rakhe (2015)
- Pendulum (2017)
- Daryaa-e-Noor (2023)
- Augochora (2023)
- Cosmojahi (2023)
- Da Vinci Club (2025)

=== Short story collections ===
- Rohossher Babocchhed Othoba Hironmoy Nirobota (2020)
- Nichok Golpo Kingba Akhan (2019)
- Naam Tar Dhul-Qarnayn (year unknown)

== Filmography ==
Year	Title
2021	Contract
2021	Rabindranath Ekhane Kokhono Khete Aseni
2023	Agochora

== Adaptations ==
A web series adaptation of Rabindranath Ekhane Kokhono Khete Asenni, directed by Srijit Mukherji, was released on the Indian OTT platform Hoichoi. Another series based on his novel Contract was produced in Bangladesh, starring Chanchal Chowdhury and Arifin Shuvoo.
