= Sumon Sarker =

Bangladeshi cinematographer

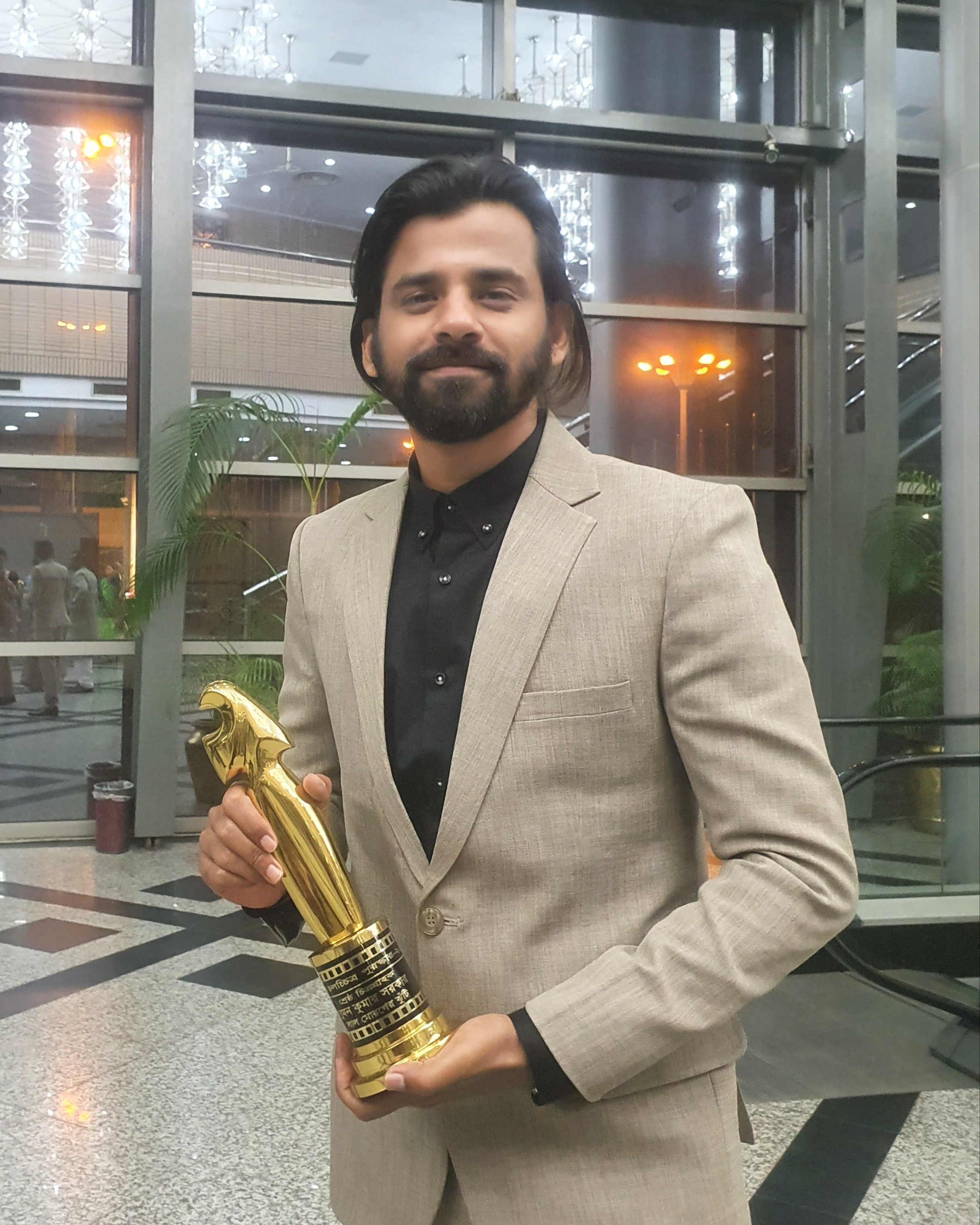
- Sarker with his second Bangladesh National Film Award for Best Cinematography, awarded for Laal Moroger Jhuti (2021)
- Born: December 21, 1987 (age 38); Khulna, Bangladesh
- Citizenship: Bangladesh
- Education: Khulna University (BSc, 2010); Bangladesh Film Institute
- Occupation: Cinematographer
- Years active: 2013–present
- Known for: No Dorai (2019); Laal Moroger Jhuti (2021); Surongo (2023)
- Awards: Bangladesh National Film Award for Best Cinematography (2019, 2021, 2023)
- Website: sumonsarkerdop.com

Sumon Sarker (born 21 December 1987) is a Bangladeshi cinematographer known for his work in Bangladeshi cinema. He has received the Bangladesh National Film Award for Best Cinematography three times, for No Dorai (2019), Laal Moroger Jhuti (2021), and Surongo (2023).

== Early life and education ==
Sarker was born on 21 December 1987 in Khulna, Bangladesh. He graduated from Khulna University in 2010 with a degree in Biotechnology and Genetic Engineering. After moving to Dhaka, he enrolled in a short course on filmmaking and cinematography at the Bangladesh Film Institute, studying under filmmaker Tanvir Mokammel.

== Career ==
After completing his studies, Sarker worked in television productions and commercials. In 2013, he co-directed a short film titled Since We Separate, which received the Critics Award at the Robi Short Film Festival, leading to an opportunity to work in television commercials alongside director Amitabh Reza Chowdhury.

Sarker made his feature-film debut as cinematographer with No Dorai (2019), directed by Taneem Rahman Angshu. The film, set along the coast of Cox's Bazar, was the first Bangladeshi film to depict surfing on the Bay of Bengal and received attention for its visual depiction of the Cox's Bazar coastline. No Dorai screened at the 18th Dhaka International Film Festival, where it received the Best Film Award from the FIPRESCI Jury, and competed at the Asia Pacific Screen Awards. The film also received multiple awards at the Bangladesh National Film Awards, including Best Cinematography for Sarker.

His second feature film, Laal Moroger Jhuti (2021), directed by Nurul Alam Atique, earned Sarker a second Bangladesh National Film Award for Best Cinematography — awarded jointly with Mazaharul Razu. The film was selected for screening at the Toronto Multicultural Film Festival.

In 2022, Sarker served as the cinematographer for Damal, directed by Raihan Rafi. He continued his collaboration with Rafi on Surongo (2023). For this production, Sarker utilized the Arri Alexa Mini LF camera system, becoming the first cinematographer in Bangladesh to use the equipment for a feature film. The film was a commercial success upon its release, and Sarker was awarded the Bangladesh National Film Award for Best Cinematography for his work.

== Filmography ==
=== Feature films ===
Year	Title	Director	Notes
2019	No Dorai	Taneem Rahman Angshu	National Film Award – Best Cinematography
2021	Laal Moroger Jhuti	Nurul Alam Atique	National Film Award – Best Cinematography (joint)
2022	Damal	Raihan Rafi	
2023	Surongo	Raihan Rafi	National Film Award – Best Cinematography; first Bangladeshi film shot with Arri Alexa Mini LF

=== Web films ===
Year	Title	Notes
2021	Unoloukik	
2021	Jaago Bahey	
2022	Floor Number 7	
2022	Nikhoj	
2022	Cafe Desire	
2023	Friday	
2025	Amalnama	

== Awards ==
Year	Award	Film	Result
2019	Bangladesh National Film Award for Best Cinematography	No Dorai	Won
2021	Bangladesh National Film Award for Best Cinematography	Laal Moroger Jhuti	Won (joint)
2023	Bangladesh National Film Award for Best Cinematography	Surongo	Won
