= Kawsar Chowdhury =

Bangladeshi filmmaker, actor

- কাউসার চৌধুরী
- Awards: Full list

Kawsar Chowdhury is a Bangladeshi filmmaker, actor and researcher on Liberation War. He won Best Documentary Film award for Boddhyo Bhumi (2021). He was awarded Ekushey Padak in 2024 by the government of Bangladesh for his documentary production and archiving of the 1971 Liberation War.

== Early life ==
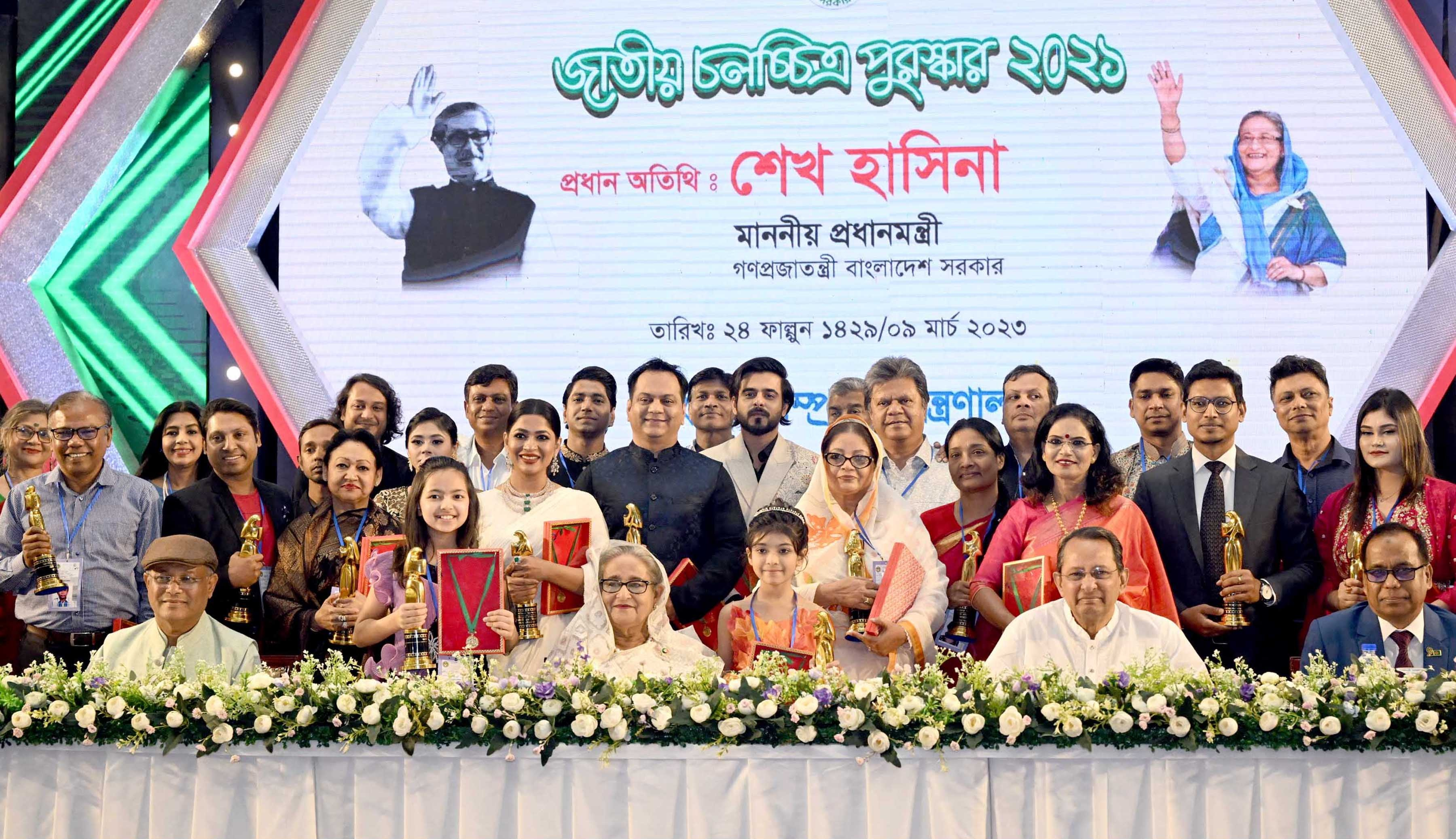
Chowdhury among the 2021 National Film Award winners

Chowdhury was born in Matarbari, Maheshkhali Upazila, Cox's Bazar District.

== Awards ==
- Ekushey Padak (2024)
- Bangladesh National Film Award for Best Documentary Film
