= Laal Moroger Jhuti =

- Bengali: লাল মোরগের ঝুঁটি
- Directed by: Nurul Alam Atique
- Written by: Nurul Alam Atique
- Screenplay by: Nurul Alam Atique
- Produced by: Government of Bangladesh; Matia Banu Shuku
- Starring: Ahmed Rubel; Ashna Habib Bhabna; Shahjahan Shamrat; Deepak Suman; Jyotika Jyoti; Ashish Khondokar; Zinat Sanu Swagata; Laila Hasan
- Cinematography: Sumon Sarker; Kashef Shahbazi; Mazharul Islam
- Edited by: Sameer Ahmed
- Music by: Raseed Sharif Shoaib
- Production company: Pandulipi Karkhana
- Distributed by: Jaaz Multimedia
- Release date: 10 December 2021
- Running time: 105 mins
- Country: Bangladesh
- Language: Bengali

Laal Moroger Jhuti (Bengali: লাল মোরগের ঝুঁটি, lit. 'Call Of The Red Rooster') is a 2021 Bangladeshi War-drama film was written and directed by Nurul Alam Atique. It was produced by Matia Banu Shuku. The film stars Ashna Habib Bhabna, Shahjahan Shamrat, Jyotika Jyoti, Deepak Suman, Ahmed Rubel, Ashish Khondokar, Laila Hasan and Zinat Sanu Swagata.

The film was set in August 1971 during Bangladesh Liberation War. It was released on 10 December to mark the 50th anniversary of independence of Bangladesh. On 9 December a special screening was held at the Bangladesh Film Archive Auditorium, presided by the Minister for Liberation War Affairs, Mozammel Haque.

== Plot ==
The film depicts the tale of people who desire independence from the Pakistani occupying forces. In 1971, Bangladesh is a prison. A troupe of the Pakistani occupation forces arrives in a small sub-divisional town to renovate an airbase built during the World War II. In the presence of the army, the relation of the three friends changes. Two of them work for the country's War of Independence while the other collaborates with the Pakistani occupying forces. Overcoming the endless story of actions and reactions, the 'Call of the Red Rooster' brings the message of a new sunrise for the persecuted and oppressed people longing for independence.

== Cast ==
- Ahmed Rubel as Shaheb Ali
- Ashna Habib Bhabna as Poddo
- Dilruba Doel as Reba, Shaheb Ali's daughter
- Shahjahan Shamrat as Captain Naqvi
- Ashok Byapari as Dharanimohon
- Shilpi Sharkar Apu as Mayarani
- Joyraj as Shamsuddin Khan
- Jyotika Jyoti as Dipali
- Ashish Khondokar as Budha
- Ananta Munir Ahmed as Golap
- Dipak Sumon as Parimal
- Zinat Sanu Swagata
- Elora Gohor
- Laila Hasan
- Khalilur Rahman Kaderi
- Refat Hasan Saikat as Subol
- Jubayer Sayed as Captain Munawar
- Matiul Alam as Hamdu Mia
- Hasimun
- Bagha as Bagha, the red roster

== Pre-production ==
In the fiscal year 2014-15 the screenplay received National Film Grant from the Bangladesh Government.

== Production ==
The shooting was started in March 2016, and held due to budget issues. The film is set primarily in three locations- Kushtia, Tangail and Gouripur. It spent six years in production.
