= Khufiya =

2023 Indian thriller film by Vishal Bharadwaj

- Official release poster
- Directed by: Vishal Bhardwaj
- Written by: Rohan Narula; Vishal Bhardwaj
- Based on: Escape to Nowhere by Amar Bhushan
- Produced by: Vishal Bhardwaj; Rekha Bhardwaj
- Starring: Tabu; Ali Fazal; Wamiqa Gabbi; Azmeri Haque Badhon
- Cinematography: Farhad Ahmed Dehlvi
- Edited by: A. Sreekar Prasad
- Music by: Vishal Bhardwaj
- Production company: VB Pictures
- Distributed by: Netflix
- Release date: 5 October 2023
- Running time: 157 minutes
- Country: India
- Language: Hindi

Khufiya (transl. Secret) is a 2023 Indian Hindi-language spy thriller film written, produced, scored and directed by Vishal Bhardwaj, based on Amar Bhushan's espionage novel Escape to Nowhere. The film stars Tabu, Ali Fazal, Wamiqa Gabbi and Azmeri Haque Badhon (in her Hindi film debut). The film revolves around a Research and Analysis Wing operative who is assigned to track down a mole, who is selling defense secrets, while also grappling with her dual identity as a spy and lover.

Bhardwaj bought the rights for the novel in 2016 and wrote the script with Irrfan Khan in mind. However, with Khan's death in 2020, and other male actors rejecting the script, he rewrote it with a female protagonist and narrated it to Tabu, who accepted the role. The film was announced in September 2021 and principal photography commenced the following month and continued till April 2022, where it was shot predominantly in Delhi and Canada. It was filmed by Farhad Ahmed Delhvi and edited by A. Sreekar Prasad.

Khufiya was released on 5 October 2023 on Netflix to positive reviews from critics, praising the performances of the lead cast, screenplay and direction.

At the 2024 Filmfare OTT Awards, Khufiya received 3 nominations, including Best Actress in a Web Original Film (for Tabu) and Best Supporting Actor in a Web Original Film (for Fazal), and won Best Supporting Actress in a Web Original Film for Gabbi.

== Plot ==
During the post-Kargil War period, Heena Rehman, a Bangladeshi woman supposed to be working for the ISI, is killed by Bangladeshi defense minister Brigadier Mirza at a party held at his house, after Mirza receives some information over the phone.

In India, Krishna "KM" Mehra, who is an operative at the Research & Analysis Wing is devastated to know of Heena's death because she used to be her lover for a brief time; Heena was in fact, working for RAW, part of which was to kill Mirza. KM's boss Jeev tells her that there is a mole in the RAW office selling India's defense secrets, whose leak led to Heena's death. KM is assigned to track down this mole. She establishes that RAW employee Ravi, whose lavish lifestyle does not match his income, must be the mole and suspects his wife Charu to be his partner in delivering secrets. KM and Jeev obtain permission to have Ravi's house electronically bugged. After some surveillance, they discover that Ravi is working for the CIA at his money-hungry mother's insistence, and that Charu is innocent.

In the meantime, Jeev discovers that Heena's death was caused not just due to Ravi leaking information to the CIA (who in turn leaked it to Mirza), but because the Minister of Home Affairs had to reveal that information to CIA to prevent the US from cancelling its nuclear deal with India. Despite being appalled that his boss let one of his assets die for keeping the nuclear deal, Jeev decides to keep this a secret to avoid further complications.

Meanwhile, Ravi discovers the cameras in his house and tries to flee along with his family. Charu is appalled to discover that Ravi is a double agent and refuses to accompany him and refuses to let him take away her son. Ravi's mother shoots Charu in the process but Charu survives as KM's team reaches there on time and gets her to the hospital. When Charu recovers, she understands that Ravi has taken their son with him and along with his mother, has sought refuge in the US. Charu begs KM to get her son back for her. KM trains Charu and sends her to the US. Charu discovers Ravi, his mother, and her son, and starts to blend back in to the family and make Ravi and his mother believe that she just wants to be with them.

KM's past with Heena is explored simultaneously in flashbacks: after spending time with her, Heena made romantic advances towards KM who initially rejected them believing she was straight, but soon realized despite learning about Heena's affiliations with ISI that she was indeed in love with Heena, causing her to discover and finally embrace her lesbian identity. Heena, to prove her love for KM, started working for RAW, gathering information from ISI as part of the plan. However, her plan to kill Mirza was foiled when Ravi leaked this information to the CIA, who in turn reported it to Mirza. KM has since been waiting to avenge her.

KM gives Ravi and his family, who are now living poor as refugees in the U.S. state of South Dakota, the opportunity to return to India as heroes if they kill Brigadier Mirza. While Mirza is on a friendly visit to Ravi's home, Ravi, Charu, and Ravi's mother attempt to poison and kill him. But he senses a ploy and kills Ravi's mother. An angry Ravi hits Mirza's head against the wall and renders him unconscious. KM coerces the CIA's undercover psychiatric doctor who was acting as Ravi's handler, and Mirza's death is staged as an accidental death from a head injury caused by slipping in the bathtub of his hotel. The Mohan family is deported to India and begins anew. At Charu's advice, KM calls her estranged teenage son to reveal the reason for her divorce from his father – because she is a lesbian.

== Cast ==
- Tabu as Krishna Mehra alias Ms.KM
- Ali Fazal as Captain Ravi Devilal Mohan, son of the late Lt. Col Devilal Kantilal Mohan, an ex-Indian army officer
- Wamiqa Gabbi as Charu Ravi Mohan, Ravi's wife
- Ashish Vidyarthi as Jeev Bonda, Krishna's boss
- Atul Kulkarni as Shashank Kantilal Mehra, Krishna's ex-husband
- Navnindra Behl as Lalita Devilal Mohan, Ravi's mother
- Shataf Figar as Brigadier Saqlain Mirza, 9th artillery brigade, Savar, Bangladesh Army
- Azmeri Haque Badhon as Heena Papon Rehman alias "Octopus" (Krishna's protége)
- Alexx O'Nell as Dr. David White
- Lalit Parimoo as Home Minister Narendra Devendra Mishra
- Rahul Vohra as Wasan Tumuk Shet
- Disney James as Kutty George
- Jan Graveson as Rachel McClane
- Meet Vohra as Vikram Shashank Mehra, Krishna's son
- Shashi Bhushan as Michael Michaels
- Monica Rae as Dr. David White's wife
- Rosabelle Folk as Rose White, Dr. David White's daughter
- Rahul Ram as His Holiness Adhunik Sant Shri. Yāra Baba aka Yāra Ji

== Production ==
=== Development ===
Vishal Bhardwaj bought the rights to the espionage novel Escape to Nowhere by Amar Bhushan and had started working on it in 2016. Bhardwaj was keen on doing an espionage thriller as it was the "most juicy genre" due to its attention to detail and the scope it had for suspense elements. Bhardwaj took him nearly two years to prepare the first draft of the screenplay, which he finished in 2018. Bhardwaj then narrated the script to Irrfan Khan, but after his death in 2020, he then narrated to other male actors who rejected the script.

Vishal put the film's pre-production on hold, due to his shift in focusing on television series, and had commissioned two projects for Netflix and Amazon Prime Video: one being an adaptation of the Salman Rushdie's novel Midnight's Children and the other being based on the hijacking of Indian Airlines Flight 814. While the former was pulled out, even before the production was set to commence, works on the latter were halted indefinitely due to the controversy surrounding over Tandav (2021), which led the platform to revise streaming content. (Note: The series was later directed by Anubhav Sinha as IC 814: The Kandahar Hijack for Netflix.) Bhardwaj then worked on an episode of the anthology series Modern Love Mumbai and directed the short film Fursat (2023) which was filmed on iPhone 14 Pro.

During the COVID-19 pandemic, Bhardwaj decided to rewrite the script to have a female protagonist. He then narrated it to Tabu whom Bhardwaj shared a working relationship since 1995. Impressed by the narration, Tabu agreed to be a part of the film. The film was announced on 25 September 2021 at the Netflix Tudum event, and Ali Fazal and Wamiqa Gabbi were cast in primary roles with Bangladeshi actress Azmeri Haque Badhon making her Hindi film debut. Gabbi was chosen for the role after sharing a similar working relationship with Bhardwaj, as "nobody wanted to play the young mother and I needed a person who would trust me blindly. I had a comfort with her and that’s why we did so many projects together."

=== Filming ===
Principal photography began in October 2021 with a schedule in Delhi. Despite being interrupted due to the second wave of COVID-19 pandemic, the second schedule began filming in February 2022 and completed that March. The film's third and final schedule commenced from April 2022 in Canada and completed that very same month. Post-production works took place for more than a year, resulted in the film's delayed release.

=== Differences from the novel ===
- In the novel, the main RAW officer is a male, but the film had a female officer playing the protagonist.
- The film featured a personal story for the protagonist, as according to Bhardwaj, "when we watch a story, we are affected by emotions and a journey happens inside us. When we connect with the emotion of the character we are watching, then our own emotional journey begins." The personal story arc was co-written by Bhardwaj with Rohan Narula.
- The book did not have a third act, but Bhardwaj written a third which started where the book ends.

The story has an eerie resemblance to a real-life spy Rabinder Singh of R&AW and his shifting to New Jersey in early 2010s. Rabinder Singh died in a road accident after spending all his monies and not having a job.

== Soundtrack ==
The music of the film is composed by Vishal Bhardwaj, with lyrics by Bhardwaj, Gulzar, and Sufi poems from Abdul Rahim Khan-i-Khanan and Kabir. The album was launched at the Raaz Aur Saaz: Khufiya Musical Night event on 7 September 2023, with the presence of the cast members and fans, and featured live performances from Bhardwaj, Rekha Bhardwaj and Sunidhi Chauhan. Their performances were compiled into a four-song live album that released two weeks later.

== Marketing and release ==
In September 2021, a short clip of the film was released from Netflix Tudum: A Global Fan Event. The film's official trailer was launched on 1 September 2023, The film was released on 5 October 2023 through Netflix.

== Reception ==
On the review aggregator website Rotten Tomatoes, 59% of 17 critics' reviews are positive, with an average rating of 6.7/10.

Saibal Chatterjee of NDTV gave 3.5 stars out of 5 and wrote "Director Vishal Bhardwaj does not appear to be at full tilt in Khufiya. The way he treats the intricacies of espionage and its human dimensions—he keeps it simple and direct, eschewing the gratuitously flashy—lends the film sustained solidity." Dhaval Roy of The Times of India gave 4 stars out of 5 and said "The fictional take on a novel said to be inspired by true events tells an engaging spy story. But it’s also the heartbreaking portrayal of personal loss that will strike a chord with the viewer, as the interesting characters and events keep one hooked until the end." Himesh Mankad of Pinkvilla wrote "Khufiya is a well-made espionage, which comes across as an interesting and entertaining film from Vishal Bhardwaj."

Anuj Kumar wrote in The Hindu that "Powered by the poetic charm of his female leads, the writer-composer-director paints a haunting character study of three emotionally conflicted women caught in the crosshairs of espionage." Nandini Ramnath of Scroll.in praised Tabu's performance, stating "Even in the silliest of scenes, Tabu is always poised for something better." Shreya Tinkhede of Times Now rated three out of five stars, saying "Khufiya is a sincere attempt by Vishal Bhardwaj to paint the dark and gruesome world of espionage with meticulous attention to detail."

Sukanya Verma of Rediff.com said "Khufiya has the length of a movie and satisfaction of long form. Some of its most beguiling sequences exude the charisma of standalone short." Lachmi Deb Roy of Firstpost wrote "Khufiya is an intense combination of suspense and complexity." Simon Abrams of RogerEbert.com rated 3 stars out of 4 and wrote "Khufiya isn't a deconstruction of the spy thriller, but it does blatantly re-orient viewers to what's often missing or downplayed in stories about spies, many of whom are presented as solitary little wheels who work for big organizations that could stop needing them at a moment's notice [...] Bhardwaj and his collaborators show respect for that guiding spirit of professionalism by only suggesting what various characters either aren't saying or aren't ready to admit to themselves."

In contrast, Prannay Pathak of Hindustan Times wrote "The film manages to tie up its own contrivances to a tidy enough end, with some humour. But it doesn’t linger in the mind, despite the grim exhortations of its whistling background score." Shubhra Gupta of The Indian Express rated 2 out of 5 stars and summarized "Despite the top-notch acting talent headed by the peerless Tabu, and Bhardwaj’s manifest skill in creating atmosphere which includes lashes of unexpected humour, ‘Khufiya’ remains, at best, a mixed bag, more drab than fab." Rahul Desai of Film Companion gave a mixed review, stating "Khufiya doesn’t need to be even. But it stops short of embracing its oddity." Anvita Singh of India Today gave 2.5 out of 5 and wrote "After its sparkling painting-like initial frame, 'Khufiya', sadly, remains a blur throughout."

== Accolades ==
Award	Date of the ceremony	Category	Recipients	Result	Ref.
Filmfare OTT Awards	1 December 2024	Best Actress in a Web Original Film	Tabu	Nominated	
Filmfare OTT Awards	1 December 2024	Best Supporting Actor in a Web Original Film	Ali Fazal	Nominated	
Filmfare OTT Awards	1 December 2024	Best Supporting Actress in a Web Original Film	Wamiqa Gabbi	Won	
