= Sushoma Sarkar =

Bangladeshi film actress

- Citizenship: Bangladeshi
- Education: Jahangirnagar University
- Occupation: Actress
- Years active: 1997–present
- Spouse: Litton Kar
- Children: 1

Sushoma Sarkar is a Bangladeshi television and film actress.

== Career ==
Sushama Sarkar studied at Jahangirnagar University. She appeared in TV dramas like Progga Paromita, Bijli, Dhonni Meye, etc. In 2016, she was cast in the Indo-Bangladesh joint venture film Badsha – The Don, which stars Jeet and Nusrat Faria.

Apart from films and television, she has acted in a number of stage dramas as well. She started with stage drama Janame Janmantare in 1999. In January 2018, it was confirmed that she'll return to stage dramas with Nityopuran as Draupadi, which is written by Masum Reza. The role was earlier played by seniors like Banya Mirza and Naznin Hasan Chumki.

== Personal life ==
Sarkar belongs to a Hindu family of Dhamrai. She is married to Litton Kar. They have a daughter, Anidra.

== Television ==
- Janame Janmantare
- Shada Megher Brishti
- Birosher Kabbo
- Nitto Puran
- Progga Paromita
- Bijli
- Dhonni Meye
- Sonar Suto
- Juboraj
- Dhaka Jadur Shohor
- Nondini
- Nulok
- Mone Mone
- The Village Engineer
- Bhalobashar Chotushkun

== Filmography ==
- Koti Takar Kabin (2006)
- The Last Thakur (2008)
- Dub Satar (2010)
- Karigor (2012)
- Olpo Olpo Premer Golpo (2014)
- Chuye Dile Mon (2015)
- Bhubon Majhi (2015)
- Badsha - The Don (2016)
- Dhat Teri Ki (2017)
- Dahan (2018)
- Shapludu (2019)
- Nabab LLB (2020)
- The Grave (2020)
- Peyarar Subash (2024)
- Esha Murder: Karmaphal (2025)

== Web series ==
- Ashare Golpo, Bioscope Original
- Gulmohor (2025)
