= Deyaler Desh =

2024 Bangladeshi romantic drama film

- Movie poster
- Directed by: Mishuk Moni
- Screenplay by: Mishuk Moni
- Story by: Mishuk Moni
- Produced by: Mahfoozur Rahman; Mishuk Moni
- Starring: Sariful Razz; Shobnom Bubly; Zinat Sanu Swagata; Shahadat Hossain
- Cinematography: Sahil Rony
- Edited by: Simit Ray Antor
- Music by: Emon Chowdhury
- Production company: Metro Cinema
- Distributed by: The Abhi Kathachitra; Chobir Haat
- Release date: 11 April 2024
- Country: Bangladesh
- Language: Bengali
- Budget: ৳2 crore (US$160,000)
- Box office: ৳2 crore (US$160,000)

Deyaler Desh is a 2024 Bangladeshi romantic drama, screenplayed and directed by Mishuk Moni, directorial debut of the director. It was produced by Mahfoozur Rahman & Mishuk Moni under the banner of Metro Cinema and it is also government granted film. It is starring Sariful Razz and Shobnom Bubly in the lead roles with Zinat Sanu Swagata, Shahadat Hossain, Azizul Hakim, Shamapty Mashuq, Saberi Alam, A K Azad Shetu and many others. Razz and Bubli paired up for the first time through this film and the film was scheduled to release on Eid al-Fitr of 2024.

== Cast ==
- Sariful Razz as Boishak
- Shobnom Bubly as Nohor
- Zinat Sanu Swagata
- Shahadat Hossain
- Azizul Hakim
- Shamapty Mashuq
- Saberi Alam
- A K Azad Setu

== Production ==
The film was submitted for Bangladesh government grant in 2020 and the movie received government grant in 2021. Finally started the shooting of the film at the last year 2022. The first look of the movie was released at a function organized at a restaurant in Hatirjheel of the capital on Monday afternoon.

== Release date ==
The film was scheduled to release on October 27, 2023, but it was postponed. It was later released in theaters on Eid al-Fitr of 11 April 2024 by The Abhi Kathachitra.
