= Adventure of Sundarbans =

2023 Bangladeshi film

- Poster
- Bengali: অ্যাডভেঞ্চার অব সুন্দরবন
- Directed by: Abu Raihan Jewel
- Written by: Muhammed Zafar Iqbal; Jakaria Showkhin
- Produced by: Mushfiqur Rahman Manzu; Abu Raihan Jewel
- Starring: Siam Ahmed; Pori Moni; Shahidul Alam Sachchu; Azad Abul Kalam; Abu Hurayra Tanvir; Kochi Khondokar
- Music by: Emon Chowdhury
- Distributed by: Stellar Digital Limited (Bongo); Jaaz Multimedia; Deepto TV
- Release date: 20 January 2023
- Running time: 1 hours 57 minutes
- Country: Bangladesh
- Language: Bengali

Adventure of Sundarbans is a 2023 Bangladeshi children's film directed by Abu Raihan Jewel. It is the first film direction for Abu Raihan Jewel. This film is an adaptation of Muhammed Zafar Iqbal's 2012 novel Ratuler Raat Ratuler Din. Siam Ahmed and Pori Moni starred as the leads. The cast also includes Shahidul Alam Shacchu, Azad Abul Kalam, Kachi Khandakar, Abu Huraira Tanveer, and a group of child actors. The film was produced by Shot By Shot and co-produced by Stellar Digital Limited (Bongo).

== Cast ==
- Siam Ahmed as Ratul
- Pori Moni as Trisha
- Shahidul Alam Sachchu
- Azad Abul Kalam
- Kochi Khandokar
- Abu Hurayra Tanvir
- Monira Mithu
- Ashish Khondokar

== Plot ==
The Sundarbans is the largest mangrove forest worldwide. It is located in Southern Bangladesh and known for its species rich wildlife. This includes the Royal Bengal Tiger, Crocodiles and Dolphins. For almost half a decade, pirates have been predominantly plaguing the region with abductions and poaching. A group of children from the "Children's Film Society" embark on a journey to the mangroves of Sundarbans in Bangladesh. The children are accompanied by renowned poets, writers, and filmmakers as well as volunteers Ratul and Trisha on the journey. Travelers can visit Sundarban only in high tides. However, things do not go as planned, and eventually, the group's ship gets stuck due to low tide. Things get even worse once the group spots local pirates approaching. Once the pirates board their ship, everyone is taken hostage. Fortunately, the ship's hidden passenger comes up with a plan, and he needs the children's help to execute it. The movie "Adventure of Sundarbans" is thrilling and adrenaline-fueled. If the children manage to escape the pirates through the help of the hidden passenger is to be revealed at the end of the movie.

== Production ==
Adventure of Sundarbans is directed by Abu Raihan Jewel while popular artists Pori Moni and Siam Ahmed were signed as main cast.' Zakaria Soukhin's screenplay is based on the novel by Muhammad Zafar Iqbal titled 'Ratuler Raat Ratuler Din'. The manuscript of the film received a government grant in the financial year 2018-19 under the title of 'Nosu Dakat Kupokat'. Later, the name was changed to 'Adventure of Sundarban'. Muhammad Zafar Iqbal has written one of the songs for the film.

== Release ==
The film got postponed due to the pandemic. However, Adventure of Sundarban was released in theatres on January 20, 2023. The official trailer was released on December 20, 2022. The film received clearance from the Bangladesh Film Censor Board on August 10, 2022. It premiered in Star Cineplex, Bashundhara City on January 20, 2023. The film was scheduled to release in 35 cinemas and internationally.

== Music ==
The movie features four songs – 'Tui Ki Amay Bhalobashish', 'Aay Aay Shob Taratari', 'Ashol Chhaira Nokol Premey', and 'Shareng Chara Jahaj Choley'. These tracks are sung by Imran, Emon-Joyita, Shamim Hasan, and Shofi Mondal.

| No. | Title | Singers | Lyrics | Tune | Music |
|---|---|---|---|---|---|
| 1 | Tui Ki Amay Bhlobasis | Imran Mahmudul | Sharif Al Din | Nazir Mahmud | Musfiq Litu |
| 2 | Asol Charai Nokol Preme | Shamim Hasan & Konal | Robiul Islam Jibon | Emon Chowdhury | Emon Chowdhury |
| 3 | Sareng Chara Jahaj Chole | Shofi Mondol | Dewan Lalan Ahmed Bappy | Emon Chowdhury | Emon Chowdhury |
| 4 | Aay Aay Sob Taratari | Emon Chowdhury & Jayita Dutta | Dr Muhammad Zafar Iqbal | Emon Chowdhury | Emon Chowdhury |

== Awards ==
| Year | Award | Category | Winner | Result | Ref. |
|---|---|---|---|---|---|
| 2026 | Bangladesh National Film Awards 2023 | Best Negative Role | Ashish Khondokar | Won | |
| 2026 | Bangladesh National Film Awards 2023 | Best Music Director | Emon Chowdhury | Won | |
