= Rabindranath Ekhane Kokhono Khete Aseni =

2021 Indian TV series by Srijit Mukherji

- First look poster
- Also known as: REKKA (siddhant ka)
- Genre: Thriller
- Based on: Rabindranath Ekhane Kokhono Khete Asenni by Mohammad Nazim Uddin
- Written by: Mohammad Nazim Uddin
- Screenplay by: Srijit Mukherji
- Directed by: Srijit Mukherji
- Starring: Azmeri Haque Badhon; Rahul Bose; Anirban Bhattacharya; Anjan Dutt; Alexx O'Nell; Anirban Chakraborty
- Composer: Joy Sarkar
- Countries of origin: India, Bangladesh
- Original language: Bengali
- No. of seasons: 1
- No. of episodes: 9

Production
- Executive producer: Siddhant Sheth
- Cinematography: Indranath Marick
- Editor: Sujay Datta Roy
- Running time: 20-30 minutes
- Production companies: SVF Entertainment; TVwala Media

Original release
- Release: 13 August 2021

Rabindranath Ekhane Kokhono Khete Aseni (English: Rabindranath never came to eat here) is a Bengali web series based on the thriller novel of the same name written by Bangladeshi writer Mohammad Nazim Uddin. The series has been released on West Bengal-based Bengali language OTT platform Hoichoi. It is directed by Indian director Srijit Mukherji. This is the second complete web series directed by Srijit Mukherji and his first work in Hoichoi. Initially, shooting was planned in both countries with the participation of several actors from Bangladesh and India, but due to the COVID-19 pandemic, shooting was done only in India. However, Azmeri Haque Badhon is the only Bangladeshi playing the central character "Mushkan Zuberi".

== Cast ==
- Azmeri Haque Badhon as Mushkan Zuberi
- Rahul Bose - Nirupam Chanda (Noore Sofa in the original book)
- Anirban Bhattacharya as Ator Ali
- Anjan Dutt as Kharaj Khashnobish (KSK or Khodadad Shahbaz Khan in the original book)
- Alexx O'Nell as Norman
- Anirban Chakraborty as IC Tapan Sikder (Tofazzal Hosain in the original book)
- Richard Bhakti Klein as Andrew
- Akshay Kapoor as Javed
- Debopriyo Mukherjee as Phalu

== Production ==
=== Background ===
In 2015, the book "Rabindranath Ekhane Kokhono Khete Asenni" written by Bangladeshi writer Mohammad Nazim Uddin was published by Batighar Prakashani of Bangladesh. The Indian version of the book was later published by Abhijan Publishers of India. Soon after its publication, the book received a wide response in Bangladesh and West Bengal. When the Kolkata-based TVwala Media expressed interest in producing the web series, they signed an agreement with the author in February 2019. Through this, the TVwala Media bought the audio-visual rights of the novel.

But then, Srijit Mukherji informed the author of his interest in making a web series based on this novel. But because of the earlier agreement with TVwala Media, it was decided to make the series by Srijit Mukherji under the production of TVwala. However, due to the COVID-19 pandemic, it was not possible to make the series with the help of Bangladeshi artists. So, later it was decided to make the series with the help of Indian artists in a joint production of Shree Venkatesh Films and TVwala Media.

=== Character selection ===
The series was initially supposed to be dominated by Bangladeshi actors. Jaya Ahsan's name comes up first as the central character "Mushkan Juberi". Mohammad Nazim Uddin, the author of the novel, made the offer to the director and the production company. But a few days later, it was heard that Pori Moni would replace Jaya Ahsan in the lead role. Also, the name of Chanchal Chowdhury as Atar Ali and the name of Mosharraf Karim as an unknown character came up for discussion. Despite rumors circulating at different times about the different characters, it was later confirmed by the director Srijit Mukherji that he had actually chosen Chanchal Chowdhury as Atar Ali. He also thought of Fazlur Rahman Babu. However, these plans could not be implemented due to the COVID-19 pandemic. Therefore, it was decided to make the series only with indian actors. That is, no one from Bangladesh was supposed to be in the series.

Anirban Bhattacharya's name came first as Ator Ali after the decision to team up with Indian actors. Paoli Dam was the first choice of the director as Mushkan Zubairi. But later, when there was a problem with her schedule, Bangladeshi actress Azmeri Haque Badhon was surprisingly chosen. Rahul Bose as investigating officer Nirupam Chanda, Anirban Chakraborty as police officer Tapan Sikdar and Anjan Dutt as Kharaj Khasanbish have been selected finally.

The first look of the characters in this series was revealed on 26 December 2020.

=== Visualization ===
Due to the COVID-19 pandemic shooting had to be done in India. The shooting of the series started from 16 December in Burdwan, Hooghly and Durgapur region of West Bengal.

== Episodes ==
Series	Episodes	Originally released
1	9	13 August 2021

=== Season 1 (2021) ===
No. overall	Episode	Directed by	Original release date
1	Bohu Juger O Par Hote	Srijit Mukherji	13 August 2021
2	Kalo Horin Chokh	Srijit Mukherji	13 August 2021
3	Nai Rawsho Nai	Srijit Mukherji	13 August 2021
4	Tumi Kon Kanoner Phul	Srijit Mukherji	13 August 2021
5	Dekha Pelam Phalgune	Srijit Mukherji	13 August 2021
6	Tomar Shawnge Praner Khela	Srijit Mukherji	13 August 2021
7	Hriday Amar Prokash holo	Srijit Mukherji	13 August 2021
8	Mayabono Biharini	Srijit Mukherji	13 August 2021
9	Tobu Mone Rekho	Srijit Mukherji	13 August 2021

== Awards ==
Award Title	Category	Awardee	Result	Ref
Hoichoi Awards	Outstanding Female Debut	Azmeri Haque Badhon	Won	
