= Esha Murder: Karmaphal =

2025 Bangladeshi crime thriller film

- Promotional poster
- এশা মার্ডার: কর্মফল
- Directed by: Sunny Sanwar
- Screenplay by: Sunny Sanwar
- Story by: Hasanat Bin Matin; Sunny Sanwar
- Starring: Azmeri Haque Badhon; Pooja Agnes Cruz
- Cinematography: Sudipto Majumdar
- Edited by: Pronoy Dasgupta
- Music by: Zahid Nirob; Imran Mahmudul; Ahmed Humayun
- Production companies: Cop Creation; Binge
- Release date: 7 June 2025
- Running time: 146 minutes
- Country: Bangladesh
- Language: Bengali

Esha Murder: Cycle of Karma (Bengali: এশা মার্ডার: কর্মফল) is a 2025 Bangladeshi crime thriller film. Directed and written by Sanny Sanwar under the banner of Cop Creation, the story was co-written with Hasanat Bin Matin, while the dialogues were written by Shahjahan Sourav. Azmeri Haque Badhon plays the lead role, with Misha Sawdagor and Sumit Sengupta appearing in special roles. The film centers on the investigation of a rape case.

== Cast ==
- Azmeri Haque Badhon as ASP Leena
- Pooja Agnes Cruz as Esha
- Shatabdi Wadud
- Faruk Ahmed as OC Sirajul
- Sharif Siraj as Nasir
- Sushoma Sarkar
- Nibir Adnan Nahid as Topu, Esha's boyfriend
- Hasnat Ripon as Shamim, a police officer
- Sorkar Rawnak Ripon as Shafi, a DB officer
- Shilpi Sarkar Apu as Esha's mother
- A. K. Azad Setu
- Ishika Sakin as Esha's friend
- Syed Ejaz Ahmed as Asif
- Sumit Sengupta as Leena's husband (special appearance)
- Misha Sawdagor as Rahman (special appearance)

== Release ==
The film was released in theaters in Bangladesh on 7 June 2025.

== Reception ==
Dhaka Tribune wrote: "The movie ‘Esha Murder: Karmaphal’, which was released on Eid-ul-Azha, was well-received by the audience. Cinema buffs especially praised Azmeri Haque Badhon’s performance".

Shanku Sharma, writing for Way2Barak, stated: "The film is bolstered by a strong supporting cast. Faruk Ahmed brings gravity to his role, while Misha Sawdagor -long known for his negative characters - adds complexity and intrigue. Sharif Shiraj, Pooja Cruz, Syed Azaz Ahmed and others turn in solid performance, each contributing meaningfully to the plot."

Sadi Mohammad Shahnewaz, in The Daily Star, wrote: ""Esha Murder" is the grounded dudh cha after the hefty servings of biriyani that "Taandob", "Insaaf", and "Utshob" have given the audience. It is an underdog that, as time passes, will only receive more adoration from fans of thrillers. The film is an honest effort, with Badhan giving it her all, both on-screen and post-release, showing up every single day to promote it. Whether the content is worth your time is subjective, but it may serve as the perfect detox after a season of mindless action films".

Pritha Parmita Nag, writing for Prothom Alo noted: "The chase and action scenes of the movie are not bad even on a small budget. Especially in the climax, the action of the main villain and the bandh in the early morning light and darkness was like a thorn in the flesh. There is not much discussion about the movie, which was released on Eid. The repeated postponement of the release date could be a reason for this. But you will definitely be surprised when you see it in the theater. The way the director has told a realistic story throughout the movie without going 'over the top' deserves praise. The biggest surprise was in the very last scene. You will understand why 'karmaphal' is added to the name in the movie. It seems to be called nature's revenge".
