= Animesh Aich =

Bangladeshi film director

- অনিমেষ আইচ
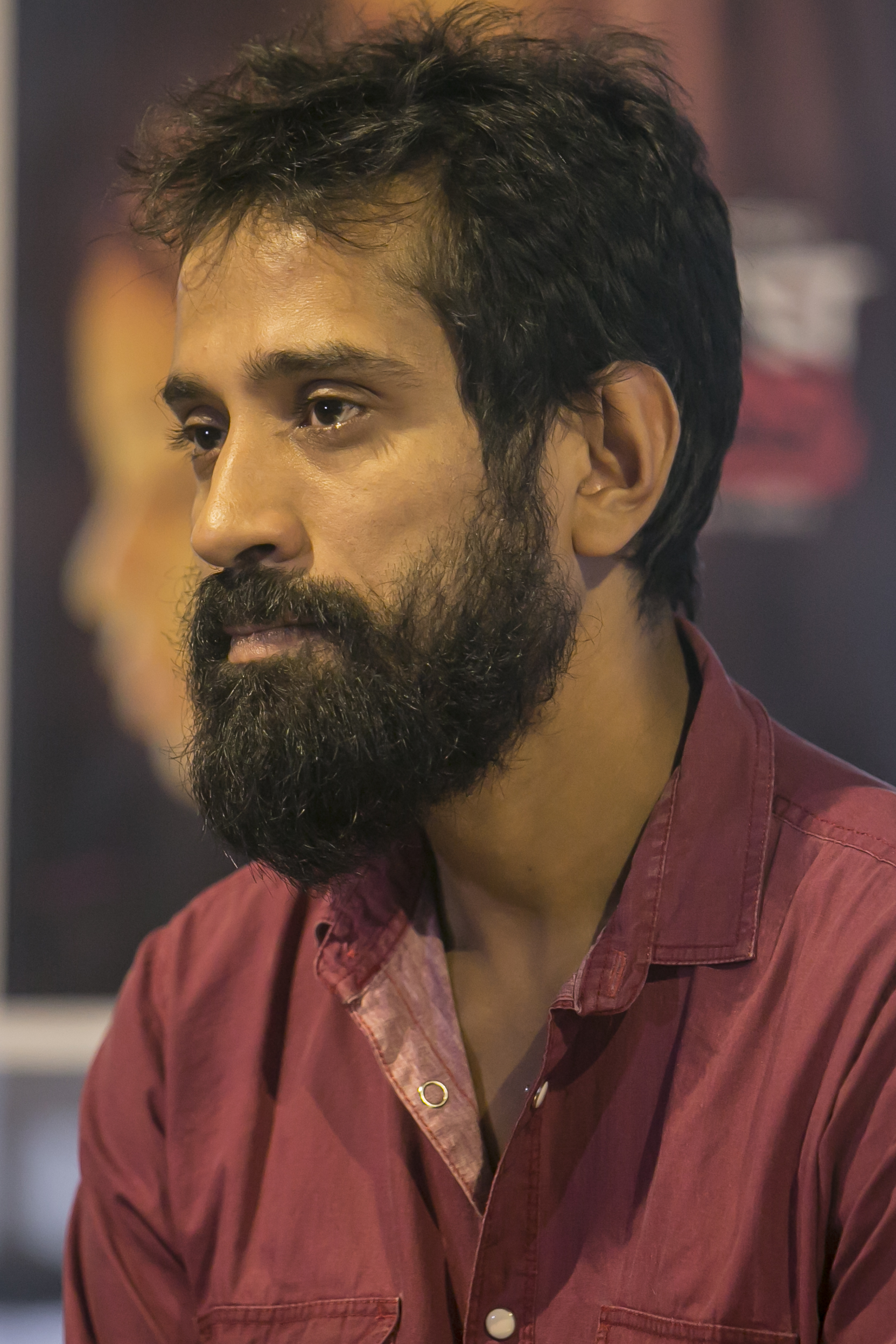
- Aich in 2018
- Born: 8 February
- Occupations: Filmmaker; Director; Actor; Writer
- Years active: 2002–present
- Known for: Guerrilla (2011); Debi (2018)

Animesh Aich (born 8 February) is a Bangladeshi filmmaker, director, actor and writer. He is a recipient of one Bangladesh National Film Award for Best Art Direction for his work in the war film Guerrilla (2011), and has also won a record four Meril Prothom Alo Awards for Best TV Director.

== Early life and education ==
Animesh Aich was born on February 8. He has a younger brother, named Anup Aich. Animesh studied sculpting at the Faculty of Fine Arts, University of Dhaka.

== Career ==
Aich joined an advertising company as a copy writer. Aich and some other contemporary directors such as Mostofa Sarwar Farooki, Tarek Shahriar, Nurul Alam Atique were involved with Jolchobi. Later he joined as an associate director in Cycle er Dana. He debuted in directing through a television drama named Kufa in 2002, for which he won the Meril-Prothom Alo Critics Choice award. In 2004, he won another Meril-Prothom Alo award for directing the television drama Chor Eshe Bhul Korechilo.

In 2011, Aich co-directed the liberation war film Guerrilla (2011), starring Jaya Ahsan and Ferdous Ahmed. It became a major success, earning ten National Film Awards, including Best Art Director for Aich. Aich's next venture was the psychological thriller Zero Degree (2015), again starring Ahsan, along with Mahfuz Ahmed. The film was highly anticipated because of Aich's previous success, but critics were disappointed with his work. His subsequent release Voyongkor Sundor (2017) also opened to a negative reception.

Aich first appeared as an actor in Lalon (2004) and Runaway (2012). In 2018, he played a supporting role in Anam Biswas's psychological thriller Debi, as the husband of Ahsan's character. Based on Humayun Ahmed's novel of the same name, the film was well-received by critics and became a box-office success.

The web film Maya, directed by Aich, was released in 2024 on the steaming platform Deepto Play. Maya is based on Bibhutibhushan Bandyopadhyay's supernatural novel of the same name.

== Awards ==
=== Meril-Prothom Alo awards ===
- Best Director Critics' Choices Award, for Kufa (2002)
- Best Director Award (Drama), for Chor Eshe Bhul Korechilo (2004)

=== National Film Awards ===
- Best Art Director, for Guerrilla (2011)

== Works ==
=== Film (as director) ===
- Guerrilla (2011)
- Zero Degree (2015)
- Voyongkor Sundor (2017)
- Maya (2024; web film, released on Deepto Play)

=== Film (as actor) ===
- Lalon (2004)
- Runaway (2013)
- Debi (2018)

=== Telefilm ===
- Chorer Master (2021)

=== Web series ===
- Beauty and the Bullet (2019)
