= Peyarar Subash =

- Poster of the film
- Directed by: Nurul Alam Atique
- Screenplay by: Nurul Alam Atique
- Produced by: Shahriar Shakil
- Starring: Ahmed Rubel; Jaya Ahsan; Tariq Anam Khan; Sushoma Sarkar
- Cinematography: Ayan Rehal
- Edited by: Sajal Alok
- Music by: Rashed Sharif Shoeb
- Production companies: Alpha-i; Chorki
- Release date: February 9, 2024
- Running time: 92 minutes
- Country: Bangladesh
- Language: Bangla

Peyarar Subash (Bengali: পেয়ারার সুবাস) (Note: Bengali: পেয়ারার সুবাস; transl. The Scent of Sin) is a 2024 Bangladeshi psychological thriller film directed by Nurul Alam Atique and co-produced by Alpha-i Studios Ltd. and Chorki. The film star Ahmed Rubel and Jaya Ahsan, along with Tariq Anam Khan, Sushoma Sarkar and Nur Imran Mithu. Ahmad Rubel died of illness on the way to the premiere show of the film the day before its release.

== Cast ==
- Ahmed Rubel
- Jaya Ahsan as Peyara
- Tariq Anam Khan
- Sushoma Sarkar
- Noor Imran Mithu

== Filming ==
The filming was begun in 2016. It was stopped in late 2020 amid the COVID-19 pandemic in Bangladesh, with intermittent breaks after the start of work. After that it took another three years to complete the remaining post-production work.

== Release ==
Producer Shahriar Shakil confirmed with Ei Samay that the film has received the censor clarification from Bangladesh Film Censor Board in November 2023. The film was released in 27 theatres on January 9, 2024. The film premiered at the 45th Moscow International Film Festival on 26 April 2023. Although the film did not win an award at the festival, the film received a positive response there.
