= Live from Dhaka =

2016 Bangladeshi film by Abdullah Mohammad Saad

- Directed by: Abdullah Mohammad Saad
- Written by: Abdullah Mohammad Saad
- Produced by: S.M Sumsur Rahman; Ehsanul Haque Babu; Arifur Rahman; Adnan Habib
- Starring: Mostafa Monwar; Tasnova Tamanna; Ali Afjal Uzzal
- Cinematography: Tuhin Tamijul
- Edited by: Abdullah Mohammad Saad
- Production company: Khelna Chobi Production
- Release date: December 2, 2016 (Singapore)
- Running time: 91 minutes
- Country: Bangladesh
- Language: Bengali

Live from Dhaka is a 2016 Bangladeshi film written and directed by Abdullah Mohammad Saad and produced by Ehsanul Haque Babu under the banner of Khelna Chobi Production. It features Mostafa Monwar and Tasnova Tamanna in the lead roles. It is portrayed in black and white.

== Synopsis ==
Within the pressure-cooker reality of living and surviving in Dhaka, physically handicapped Sazzad has just lost all his money in a recent stock market crash. Struggling to survive and hounded by loan sharks, he no longer knows how to deal with his girlfriend Rehana, and his drug-addicted brother, Michael. As the pressure mounts, Sazzad becomes increasingly desperate to find any means to escape from Dhaka and his troubles, sinking deeper into the darkness of his soul.

== Cast ==
- Mostafa Monwar as Sazzad
- Tasnova Tamanna as Rehana
- Tanvir Ahmed Chowdhury
- Mosharraf Hossain
- Rony Sazzad
- Shimul Joy
- Ali Afjal Uzzal

== Release and reception ==
The film premiered in Singapore International Film Festival on December 2, 2016. It was released to theatres on March 29, 2019. At the 27th Singapore International Film Festival, it received Silver Screen Awards for Best Director and Best Performance (Mostafa Monwar). At the 2019 Meril Prothom Alo Awards, Live from Dhaka received three Critics’ Choice awards: Best Director for Abdullah Mohammad Saad, Best Actor for Mostafa Monwar, and Best Actress for Tasnova Tamanna.
