= Voyongkor Sundor =

- Poster
- Directed by: Animesh Aich
- Starring: Parambrata Chatterjee; Ashna Habib Bhabna
- Release date: 4 August 2017
- Country: Bangladesh
- Language: Bengali

Voyongkor Sundor is a 2017 Bangladeshi Bengali–language psychological drama film, directed by Animesh Aich. Starring Parambrata Chatterjee, the film marked the debut of actress Ashna Habib Bhabna. The script is based on Mati Nandi's novel Joler Ghurni O Bokbok Shobdo.

== Cast ==
- Parambrata Chatterjee as Muku Nandi
- Ashna Habib Bhabna as Nayantara
- Shilpi Sarkar Apu
- Faruq Ahmed
- Syed Hasan Imam
- Allen Shubhro
- Khairul Alam Sabuj

== Release and reception ==
Voyangkor Sundor was initially supposed to release in 150 Bangladeshi theatres but later got limited to 28 theatres only.

It opened to predominantly negative response from the audience. Fahmim Ferdous of The Daily Star found the film "an undercooked story with too many flaws to look past."
