= Nurul Alam Atique =

Bangladeshi film director

- নুরুল আলম আতিক
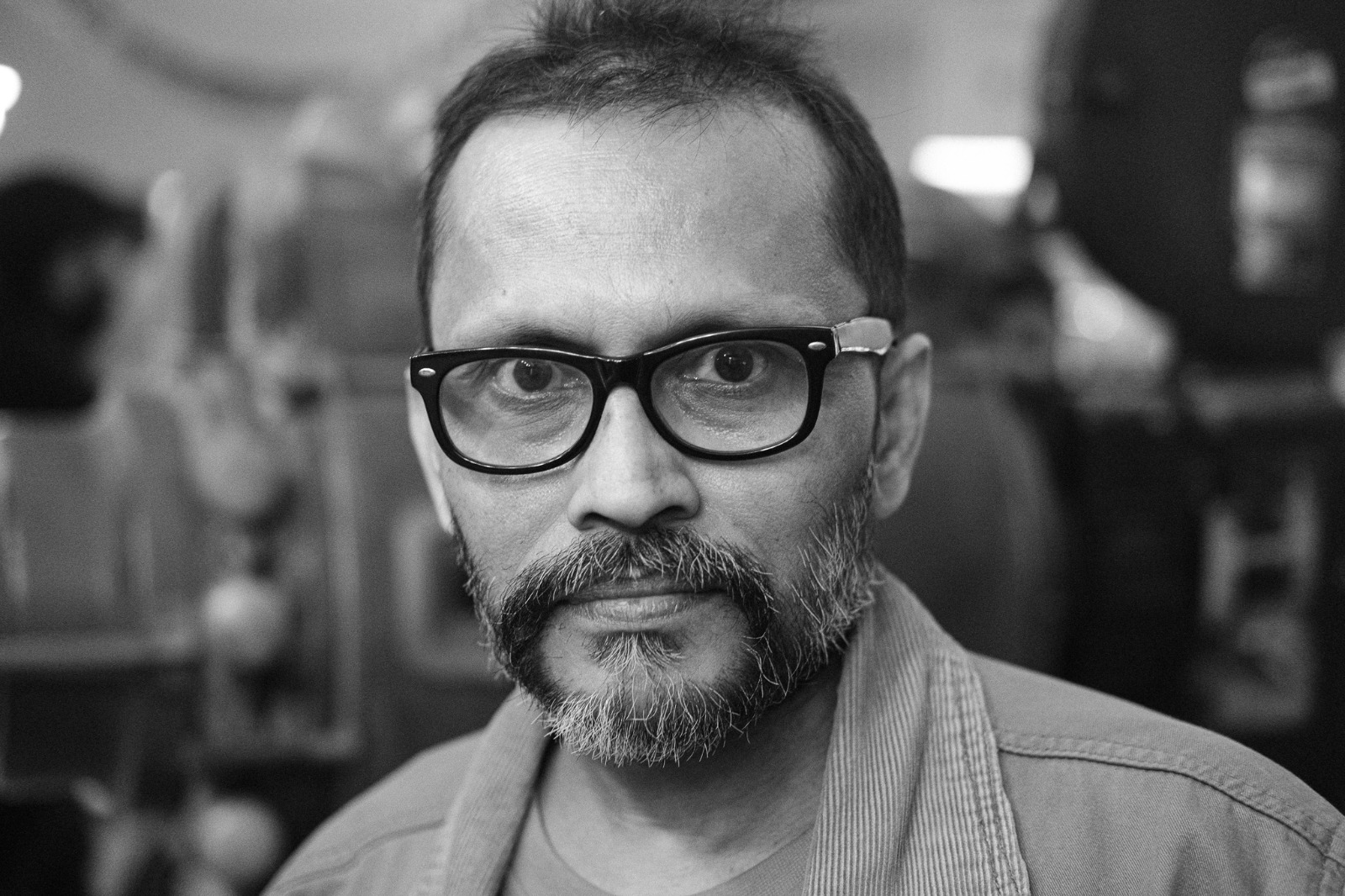
- Atique in 2023
- Born: 31 August 1969 (age 57); Tangail, East Pakistan, Pakistan
- Education: University of Dhaka, Film and Television Institute of India
- Occupations: Director, screenwriter
- Years active: 1998–present
- Notable work: Laal Moroger Jhuti; Peyarar Subash; Dubshatar
- Spouse: Matia Banu Shuku
- Children: 3
- Awards: Bangladesh National Film Award, Meril-Prothom Alo Awards
- Website: nurulalamatique.com

Nurul Alam Atique is a Bangladeshi television dramatist, scriptwriter and film-maker. Atique received the Bangladesh National Film Award as the best scriptwriter for the full-length feature film Kittonkhola directed by Abu Sayeed. He also received the National Award for Best Scriptwriter for the film Laal Moroger Jhuti, which he directed himself. Nurul Alam Atique is a Bangladeshi television dramatist, scriptwriter and film-maker. Atique received the Bangladesh National Film Award as the best scriptwriter for the full-length feature film Kirtonkhola directed by Abu Syed). He also received the Meril Prothom Alo Critic Award as the best director and best scriptwriter for his first video film Choturtha Matra.

== Early life and education ==
Atique started his career as a computer graphics designer at Xenesys in 1998. He later worked as a motion graphics designer at Eastern Panorama from 1999 to 2000. He worked as a writer and director at Jolchobi Movie Factory from 2000 to 2003 and a production coordinator at Maachranga Productions from 2005 to 2007. In 2021-2022, he served as a project coordinator at Black Mirror Films, and as a writer and director at Pandulipi Karkhana starting in 2008.

== Personal life ==
Nurul Alam Atique is married to Matia Banu Shuku, who is a producer at Pandulipi Karkhana. Banu Shuku often collaborates with Atique as a producer and has her own independent career as a scriptwriter, editor, and filmmaker, primarily working with TV productions. The couple has three children.

== Filmography ==
| Year | Title | Director | Writer | Notes |
|---|---|---|---|---|
| 2000 | Kittonkhola | No | Yes | 35mm Feature Film, Received Bangladesh National Film Award (best script) Directed by Abu Sayeed |
| 2001 | Phoolkumar | No | Yes | 16mm Feature Film, Directed by Ashique Mustafa |
| 2001 | Choturtha Matra | Yes | Yes | 78 min. Received Meril-Prothom Alo Awards 2002 |
| 2009 | Dubshatar (In Too Deep) | Yes | Yes | 92 min. Received Meril-Prothom Alo Awards 2010 |
| 2021 | Manusher Bagaan (People of the Garden) | Yes | Yes | 84 min. Unreleased |
| 2021 | Laal Moroger Jhuti (Call of the Red-rooster) | Yes | Yes | 105 min. Received Bangladesh National Film Award (best film and best script) |
| 2022 | Peyarar Subash (The Scent of Sin) | Yes | Yes | 95 min. Attended in Main Competition, 45th Moscow International Film Festival, Russia, 2023 |
| 2025 | Laal | Yes | Yes | Received govt. grant. Based on the life of painter SM Sultan |

== OTT productions ==
- Ashare Golpo (2022) / Director (Bioscope Original)
- Paanch Phoron (2019) (web series) /Director (OTT platform Hoichoi)

== Television productions ==
- Choturtha Matra / Tele Film
- Cycle er Dana / Tele Film
- Polayanporbo / Serial
- Jora Ilish / Tv Drama
- Bonophul / Tele Film
- Jaal / TV Drama
- Labonyo Prova / Mega serial
- Chiti / TV Series
- Baro vooter kichha / TV Drama
- cinderella / TV Drama
- Odrissho manob / Tele Film
- Mone-mone / TV Serial
- Chondrobindu / Non-fiction
- Ekta Phone kora jabe, plz./ Scriptwriter
- Everest / Tv Drama
- Marmaid / Tv Drama
- Ekta kinle ekta free/ Mega serial
- Icecream/ TV Drama
- A journey by boat/ TV Drama
- Bikol pakhir gaan/ TV Drama
- Obak Shondesh/ TV Drama
- Kushumer Cahrpash/ TV Drama
- Highway/ TV Drama
- Dalim Kumar/ TV Drama
- Saifulartish/ TV Drama
- Golpoguchcho/ TV Series
- Jadur Shahar/ Mega Serial

== Books, journals and publications ==
- Editor, Nree (issues on SM Sultan, Myth etc.)
- Writer, Notun Cinema Shomoyer Proyojon
- Writer, Moger Mulluke Firingeer Beshati
- Writer, Manusher Bagan (Poems)
- Writer, Sofar Aaaka Sultaner Mukh

== Awards ==
Film:

- Best Scriptwriter (jointly with Abu Sayeed), Bangladesh National Award,2002 Kittonkhola (dir. Abu Sayeed)
- Best Scriptwriter, Bangladesh National Award, 2022 Laal Moroger Jhuti (dir. Nurul Alam Atique)
- Best Film, Bangladesh National Award, 2022 Laal Moroger Jhuti (dir. Nurul Alam Atique)
- Best Director, 3rd Bangladesh Film Festival,2023. Laal Moroger Jhuti (Bangladesh Shilpokola Academy)

TV:

- Best Scriptwriter, Meril Prathom Alo Critic Award 2002, Choturtha Matra
- Best Director, Meril Prathom Alo Critic Award 2002, Choturtha Matra
- Best Director, Meril Prathom Alo Critic Award 2003, Cycle er Dana
- Best Scriptwriter, Meril Prathom Alo Critic Award 2008, Ekta Phone kora jabe plz.
- Best Director, Meril Prathom Alo Critic Award 2010, Bikol Pakhir Gaan
- Best Scriptwriter, Meril Prathom Alo Critic Award 2010, Bikol Pakhir Gaan
- Best Scriptwriter, Daily Star – SCB Critic Award 2010, Bikol Pakhir Gaan
- Best Director, Daily Star – SCB Critic Award 2010, Bikol Pakhir Gaan
