= Dubshatar =

Bangladeshi drama film

- Official poster
- Bengali: ডুবসাঁতার
- Directed by: Nurul Alam Atique
- Screenplay by: Nurul Alam Atique
- Story by: Matia Banu Shuku
- Produced by: Faridur Reza Sagor; Ebne Hasan Khan
- Starring: Joya Ahsan; Ashoke Bepari; Wahida Mallik Jolly; Shahriar Shuvo; Tinni; Sushoma Sarkar
- Cinematography: Rashed Zaman
- Edited by: Maksud Hossain; Sameer Ahmed; Ali Nakir Sany
- Music by: Victor Das; Anam Biswas; Pintu Ghosh
- Distributed by: Impress Telefilm Limited
- Release date: 16 October 2010
- Running time: 90 minutes
- Country: Bangladesh
- Language: Bengali

Dubshatar (Bengali: ডুবসাঁতার, lit. 'In too deep') is a 2010 Bangladeshi drama film directed by Nurul Alam Atique. It stars Jaya Ahsan in lead role. It had a television premiere, which deeply disappointed Atique.

== Plot ==
The story is of a complicated relationship between a female social worker and a drug addict. It involves any confrontation involving any individual, your sibling, or any other individual. Each and every confrontation conveys a tale. They will live any existence, apparently with their mundane, rich in drudgery and monotony. However, involving these kind of minutes regarding uninteresting drudgery, one discovers minutes regarding natural poems, exhilaration and enlightenment. The actual history regarding "In Too Deep" is just like that. Renu, once a tomboy, rich in existence and objectives, enters a paradigm regarding "reality". She's been your eye regarding the girl older sibling, created window blind directly into this world. Your lover presented shade inside his / her world, since the girl world becomes grey. She's been agreeing to the globe. The woman's fantasy and the girl fact are usually including two distant exoplanets. The woman's avoid will become the girl interest, consumed about, since a kind of obsession, with the distant and aloof world of your recluse male. The woman's discussion with your pet bears any strange fruits. And the lady attempts to find the girl responses all-around the girl, by the girl child years to be able to the girl goals and beyond. Can your adjusting tides all around the girl carry the girl reply?

== Cast ==
- Joya Ahsan as Renuka Rahman
- Arafat Hossain as Rokon
- Ashoke Bepari as Rokon
- Shahriar Shuvo as Rehan
- Wahida Mollick Jolly as Mother
- Debangshu Hore as Pakhi
- Tinni as Punom
- Shadhin Khosru as Sunny
- Sushoma Sarkar as Mithila
- Rudro Shahriar as Imran
- Qazi Apu as Renu's Colleague1
- Kakoli as Colleague 2
- Shamim Visti as Colleague 3
- Swagata as Diveya
- Sadnima as Renu, Kid
- Kunal as Rokon, Kid
- Meena as Mother, Young
- Shawjib as Mustan
- Junaid Halim as Shopkeeper

== Reception ==
=== Critical response ===
The Daily Star rated the film 2 out of 5 saying "Another extraordinary acting by Jaya Ahsan saves this dull movie".
