= Matia Banu Shuku =

Bangladesh screenwriter

- মাতিয়া বানু শুকু
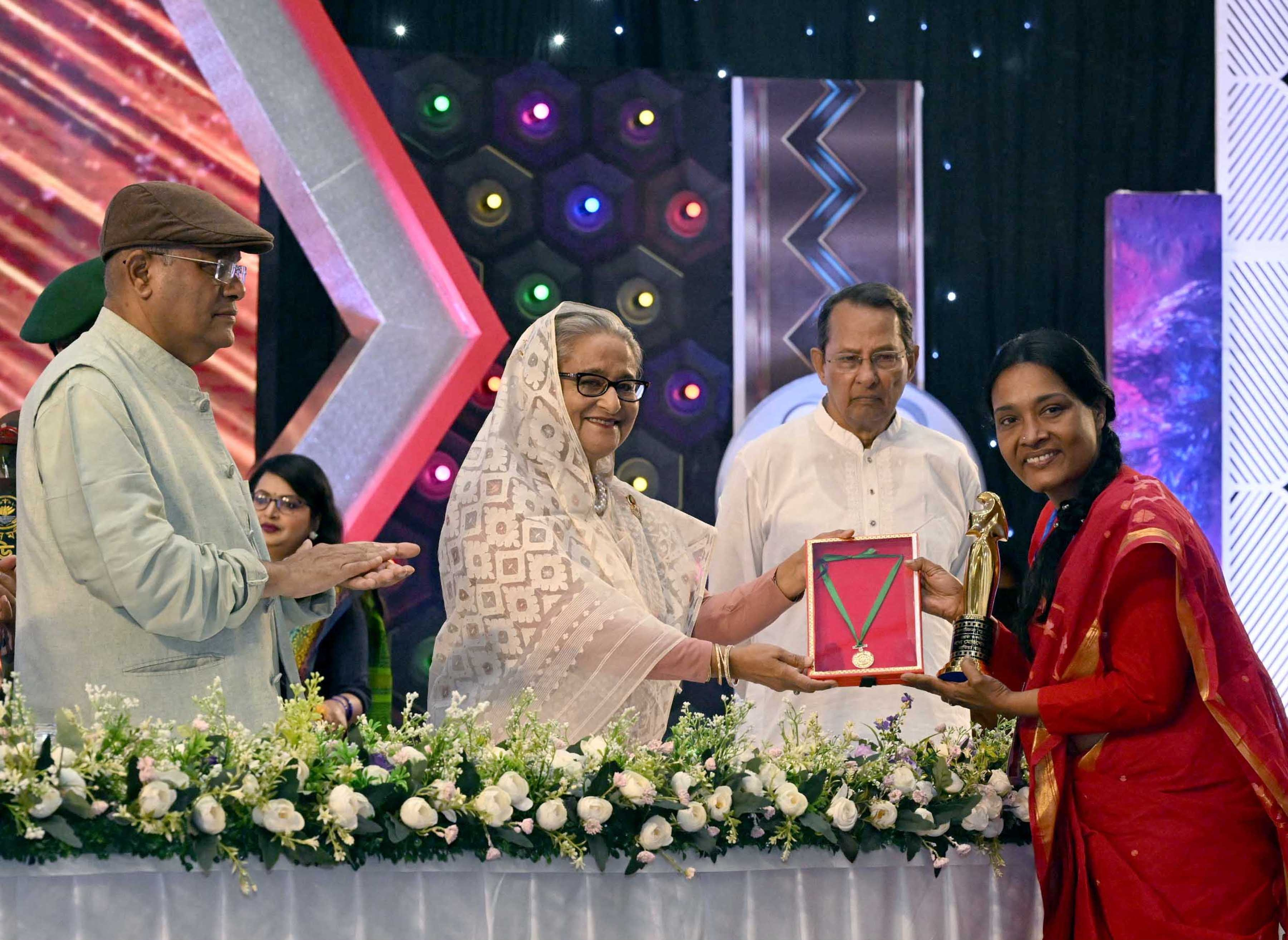
- Shuku (right) receiving National Film Award from Sheikh Hasina (2023)
- Education: University of Dhaka
- Spouse: Nurul Alam Atique
- Father: Abdul Matin

Matia Banu Shuku is a Bangladeshi screenwriter, director and filmmaker. She was the producer of the Bangladesh National Film Award for Best Film winning film Laal Moroger Jhuti (2021).

== Background ==
Matia Banu Shuku was born to language activist Abdul Matin. She has a sister, Maliha Suvon. Shuku studied at the Department of Printmaking of the Faculty of Fine Arts at the University of Dhaka.

== Career ==
Shuku got her breakthrough as a screenwriter of the mega television serial Labonyo Probha. Her notable works include Mon-e Mon-e and Dengue-r Dingulitey Prem. She wrote the script and co-directed the 52-episode mega TV serial Ekta Kinley Arekta Free (2009).

Shuku made her debut as a director with the television series To Let (2008), aired on NTV. She produced Laal Moroger Jhuti (2021) which won Bangladesh National Film Award for Best Film.

== Personal life ==
Shuku is married to Nurul Alam Atique, a television dramatist, scriptwriter and filmmaker. Together they have three children.

Shuku is diagnosed with cancer. As of October 2025, she has been treated in a hospital in Chennai.
