= Laila Hasan =

Bangladeshi choreographer, dancer and actress

- লায়লা হাসান
- Born: 1946 (age 79–80)
- Education: University of Dhaka (MA)
- Occupations: Dancer, actress
- Spouse: Syed Hasan Imam

Laila Hasan (born 1946) is a Bangladeshi choreographer, dancer and actress. She was awarded Ekushey Padak in 2010 for her contribution to art by the government of Bangladesh.

== Early life and education ==
Hasan was born in Dhaka Bikrampur (Munshiganj) in 1946. She completed her MA in philosophy from the University of Dhaka in 1970. Her grandfather, Ali Ahmed Khan, was the LLM of Juktofront.

== Career ==
Hasan got her dance lessons from Manibardhan Mahashay, Ajit Sanyal, Babu Ram Singh, GA Mannan and Shamar Bhattacharya of Bulbul Academy for Fine Arts (BAFA).

Hasan was the presenter of the TV show Rumjhum on Bangladesh Television during 1980–85. Rumana Rashid Ishita, Tarin Jahan, Srabonti, Riya and Richi Solaiman were her students on the show.

Hasan has acted on theater, television plays and films. Her performances in productions like "Kankabotir Ghatey", Raktokarobi", "Chhuti", "Mayar Khela", "Raja Rani", "Tasher Desh", "Swargo Hotey Bidaye", "Shyamol Matir Dhoratoley", "Neel Darpan", "Dutta", "Keranir Jiban", "Taming of the Shrew" and "Nakshi Kanthar Math". Her TV plays include "Mon Poboner Nao","Kajol Rekha", "Bhelua Shundari", "Mahua", "Rani Bhabanir Path", "Ratnadwip" and "Pashapashi" and "Ashcharjo Ek Raater Galpo". Her acted films are 'Gharey Bairey', 'Feluda' (2007), 'Tintoretto-er Jishu' and 'Ei Tho Prem' and 'Moner Manush'.

Hasan founded the dance organization named 'Nataraj' in 1990. And in 1996 Nataraj started theatre, stage drama with Nayeem Hasan Suja. Laila Hasan work in Nataraj as the President and Nayeem Hasan Suja is the Secretary General. Laila Hasan is a lifetime member of Bangla Academy and West Bengal Dance Federation. She is also a member of Asiatic Society and President of Bangladesh Nritya Shilpi Shangstha.

Hasan has published two books Hridoye Bajey Nupur (1996) on dance and Mohonrupey on aesthetics.

== Personal life ==
Hasan is married to actor Hasan Imam. Hasan has six siblings. One sister, Daisy Ahmed, is an actress.

== Awards ==
- BACHSHASH Award (2001)
- Kazi Mahbub Ullah Begum Zebunnessa Trust Award (2001)
- Ekushey Padak (2010)
