= Azmeri Haque Badhon =

Bangladeshi actress

- আজমেরী হক বাঁধন
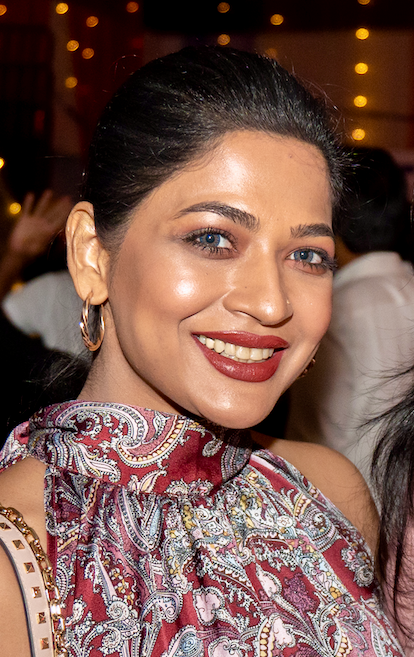
- Badhon in 2022
- Born: 28 October 1983 (age 42); Dhaka, Bangladesh
- Education: Bachelor of Dental Surgery
- Alma mater: Bangladesh Dental College
- Occupations: Actress, model
- Years active: 2006–present
- Notable work: Rehana Maryam Noor
- Spouse: Moshrur Hossain Siddiqi Sonet (m. 2010; div. 2014)
- Children: 1
- Awards: See full list

Azmeri Haque Badhon (born 28 October 1983) is a Bangladeshi actress who has also worked in Indian cinema. She became notable after being the 2nd runners-up at the Lux Channel I Superstar in 2006. Later, she made her film debut with a film called Nijhum Oronney in 2010 along with Ilias Kanchan and Champa. She also acts television drama.

Badhon got her breakthrough in acting for her lead role at Rehana Maryam Noor (2021), the first officially selected Bangladeshi film in the "Un Certain Regard" section of the 74th Cannes Film Festival. She won Bangladesh National Film Award for Best Actress, the 14th Asia Pacific Screen Awards (APSA) in "Best Actress" category and the Hong Kong Asian Film Festival award in the New Talent category for this film.

== Early life and education ==
Azmeri Haque Badhon was born on 28 October 1983 in Dhaka, Bangladesh. Her ancestral background is in Munshiganj. She earned her bachelor's degree in dental surgery from Bangladesh Dental College and Hospital.

== Career ==
Badhon took part in a Beauty Pageant at a young age. She is also well known for her work in drama serials such as Choita Pagla, Shuvo Bibaho, Chand ful Omaboshsha, Rong and Hijibiji Nothing. She also has interest in dental practice. Badhon is mostly busy with television plays these days. She made her Bollywood debut with Vishal Bhardwaj's Khufiya in a prominent role alongside renowned Indian actor Tabu and Ali Fazal.

== Personal life ==
Badhon has a daughter, Michele Amani Sayera (age 14). In 2018, she received guardianship of Saira, by the verdict was given by Dhaka's 12th District and Session Court's Assistant Judge.

=== Activism ===
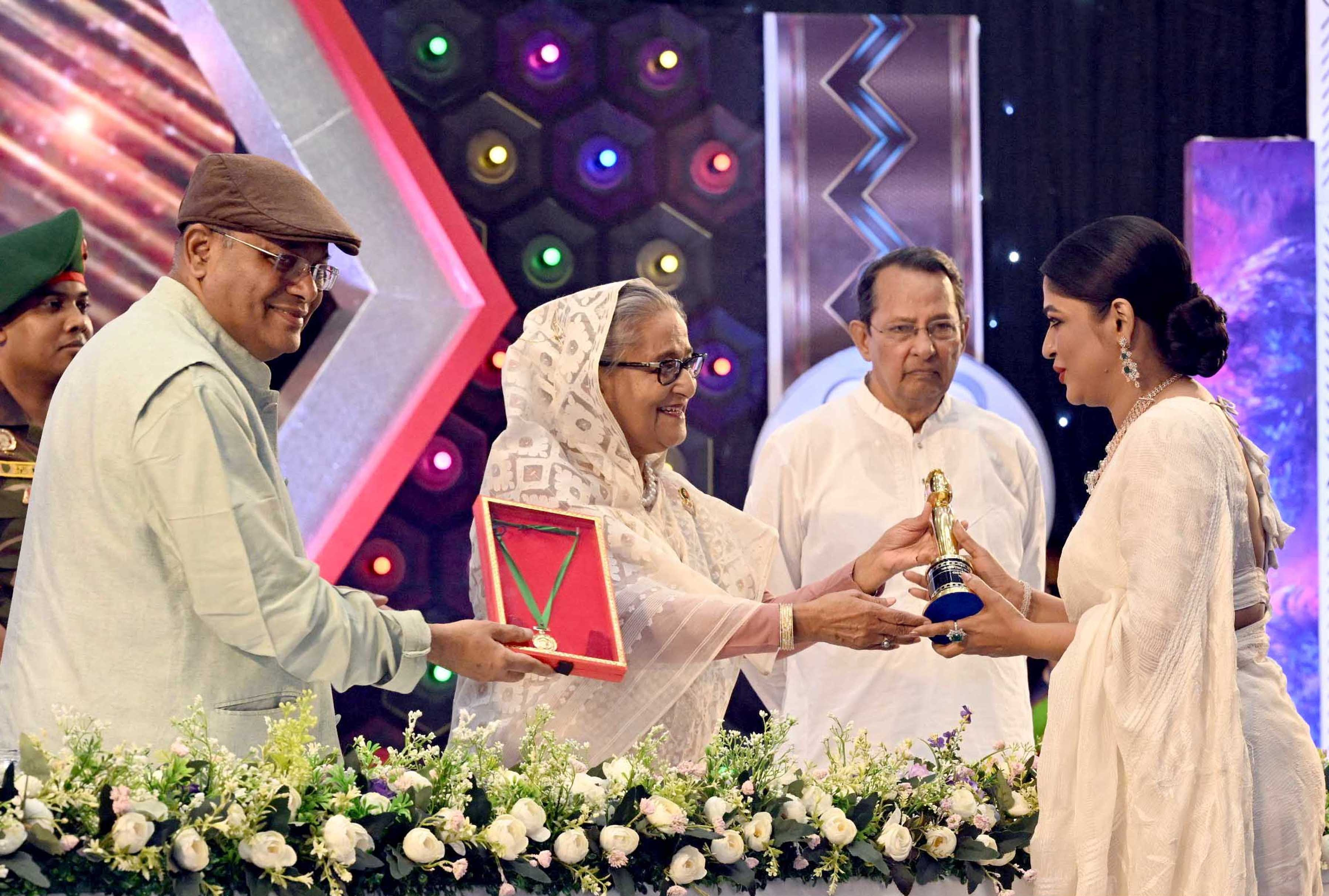
Badhon receives 2021 National Film Award.

Badhon is associated with social activism including the issues on women's rights and mental health. At the Wow Festival organized by the British Council, she made important statements about women's rights and social change. As part of UN Women's social activities, she spoke out against marital rape.

== Filmography ==
=== Films ===
Key
†	Denotes films that have not yet been released

Year	Film	Role	Notes	Ref.
2010	Nijhum Oronney	Neela	Debut film	
2021	Rehana Maryam Noor	Rehana Maryam Noor		
2023	Khufiya	Heena Rahman alias "Octopus"	Debut Hindi film	
2025	Esha Murder: Cycle of Karma	ASP Leena		
2026	Bonolota Express	Surma		
2026	Master	Nanziba	Premiered at IFFR, Sydney Film Festival, MIFF	
2026	The Difficult Bride		Premiered at Venice Film Festival	
2026	Lojja †	TBA	Filming	

=== Web series ===
Year	Title	Role	Platform	Note
2021	Robindronath Ekhane Kawkhono Khete Aashenni	Mushkan Zuberi	Hoichoi	
2022	Guti	Sultana	Chorki	

=== TV shows and drama ===
- Mehghey Dhaka Shohor
- Choita Pagla
- Shuvo Bibaho
- Rong
- Bhalobasha Kare Koy

=== Film jury activity ===
- Jury Member, I Am Tomorrow Film Festival, Brussels
- Jury Member, Asian films Competition, 15th Bengaluru International Film Festival, India

== Awards ==
Year	Awards	Category	Work	Results
2021	Hoichoi Awards	Outstanding Female Debut	Robindronath Ekhane Kawkhono Khete Aashenni	Won
2021	Asia Pacific Screen Awards	Best Performance (Actress)	Rehana Maryam Noor	Won
2021	The 45th National Film Awards of Bangladesh	Best Actress	Rehana Maryam Noor	Won
2022	37th Cinema Jove Valencia (Spain)	Best Actress	Rehana Maryam Noor	Won
2024	Meril-Prothom Alo Award 2023	Best actress	Guti	Won
