= Abdullah Mohammad Saad =

Bangladeshi film director, screenwriter, and producer

- Born: 1985 (age 40–41); Bangladesh
- Occupations: Film director; screenwriter; producer
- Years active: 2016
- Notable work: Rehana Maryam Noor
- Awards: Asia Pacific Screen Awards

Abdullah Mohammad Saad is a Bangladeshi film director, screenwriter and producer. His debut film is Live from Dhaka (2016), which received Silver Screen Awards for Best Director and Best Performance at the 27th Singapore International Film Festival. His second film Rehana Maryam Noor was selected in the Un Certain Regard section at the 2021 Cannes Film Festival. Rehana Maryam Noor also earned him the Jury Grand Prize at the Asia Pacific Screen Awards.

== Early life ==
Saad born in 1985 in Chittagong, Bangladesh. He studied education and research at University of Dhaka.

== Career ==
Under his own production company, he has produced short films and commercials. In 2016, his debut feature film Live from Dhaka, premiered in Singapore International Film Festival on 2 December 2016. It was released to theaters on 29 March 2019. At the 27th Singapore International Film Festival, it received Silver Screen Awards for Best Director and Best Performance (Mostafa Monwar).

His second feature film Rehana Maryam Noor screened at the Cannes Film Festival on 7 July 2021. It was the first Bangladeshi film featured in the Un Certain Regard category of the festival.

== Filmography ==
Key
†	Denotes films that have not yet been released

Year	Film	Credits as	Notes	Ref.
2016	Pasher Ghor	Co-writer	Short film	
2016	Live from Dhaka	Director, writer and editor	Premiered at the Singapore International Film Festival	
2021	Rehana Maryam Noor	Director, writer and editor	Selected in the Un Certain Regard section at the 2021 Cannes Film Festival.	
2026	Eyes †	Story and screenplay	Filming	

=== Web series ===
Series, OTT works
Year	Series	Credits as	Notes	Ref.
2022	Refugee	Writer	Web series on Hoichoi	
2026	ANNiE	Director, writer and editor	Web series; selected at Seriencamp	

== Awards and nominations ==
Year	Awards	Category	Work	Results
2021	Asia Pacific Screen Awards	Jury Grand Prize	Rehana Maryam Noor	Won
