= Nonajoler Kabbo =

2020 film by Rezwan Shahriar Sumit

- Directed by: Rezwan Shahriar Sumit
- Written by: Rezwan Shahriar Sumit
- Produced by: Ilann Girard; Assaduzzaman Sokal (Associate)
- Starring: Titas Zia; Fazlur Rahman Babu; Shatabdi Wadud; Tasnova Tamanna; Ashoke Bepari
- Cinematography: Chananun Chotrungroj
- Music by: Shayan Chowdhury Arnob
- Production company: My Pixel Story Half Stop Down
- Release dates: 26 October 2020 (London); 26 November 2021 (Bangladesh)
- Country: Bangladesh
- Language: Bengali

Nonajoler Kabbo (Bengali: নোনাজলের কাব্য; transl. The Salt in Our Waters) is a 2020 Bangladeshi drama film written and directed by Rezwan Shahriar Sumit With the Producer of Half Stop Down as associate Producer Md Assaduzzaman Sokal. It was screened at the BFI London Film Festival in the United Kingdom on 26 October 2020 and was later released in Bangladesh on 26 November 2021, over one year later. The film stars Fazlur Rahman Babu, Shatabdi Wadud, Titas Zia, Tasnova Tamanna, and Ashoke Bepari.

== Plot ==
Sculpture artist Rudro (Titas Zia) leaves the city to venture where his father once assisted with aid relief for the community after a cyclone hit. He sets up a studio in the local village of Patuakhali, Barisal, creating beautiful, elegant figures, many of which depict the human body. Soon, his modern outlook is met with contempt, creating a divide between the traditional and more progressive ways of urban life.

The locals are led by a chairman and faith leader ( Fazlur Rahman Babu), who feels threatened by Rudro’s creations, interpreting the artwork as a form of idolatry – an affront to the very core Islam. The artist has again targeted as the village experiences a shortage of fish, the popular ilish (hilsa) native to South Asia. When he attempts to explain the effects of climate change, Rudra faces antagonism as superstitions come up against scientific logic. However, he has a few people on his side, like his tenant Bashar’s daughter, Tuni, and her little brother Taher.

== Cast ==
- Titas Zia as Rudro
- Fazlur Rahman Babu as Chairman
- Shatabdi Wadud as Talash
- Tasnova Tamanna as Tuni
- Ashoke Bepari as Bashar

== Release ==
The film was shown at the London Film Festival 2020, Busan International Film Festival, Singapore International Film Festival, Kolkata International Film Festival and several other.

== Reception ==
It received generally positive feedback from Critics and festivals. Thomas Flew from Sight & Sound said 'Rezwan Shahriar Sumit’s thoughtful debut makes sculptor Rudro a fish out of water in an idyllic Bangladeshi fishing town with old-fashioned residents.' Adriana Rosati from Asian Movie pulse reviewed 'Classic clash-of-cultures drama set against a stunning backdrop, echoing climate change concerns.'

It won the Best film in Asian Select Category at Kolkata International Film Festival and awarded France’s CNC Aide aux cinémas du monde, TFL Audience Design Fund, Bangladesh’s national film grant, and the Spike Lee Fellowship.

== Awards ==
- Hiralal Sen Award 1428 - Best Feature Film
- Won the Best film in Asian Select Category at Kolkata International Film Festival
- Awarded France’s CNC Aide aux cinémas du monde
