= Rezwan Shahriar Sumit =

Bangladeshi filmmaker

- রেজওয়ান শাহরিয়ার সুমিত
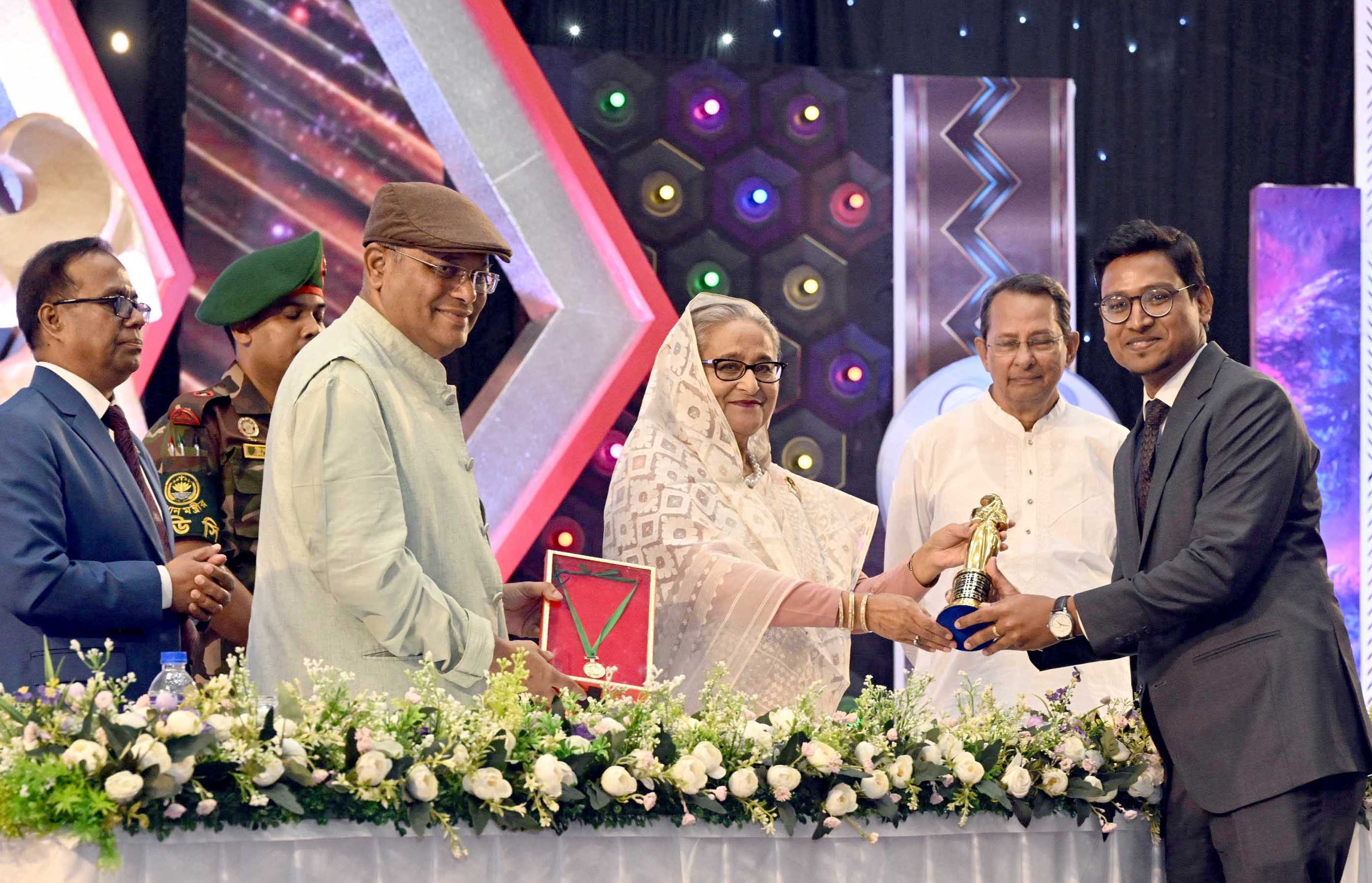
- Sumit (right) receiving National Film Award from Sheikh Hasina (2023)
- Education: New York University Tisch School of the Arts
- Occupation: Filmmaker

Rezwan Shahriar Sumit is a Bangladeshi filmmaker. He won Bangladesh National Film Award for Best Film and Best Director for his debut film Nonajoler Kabbo (2021). In 2026, Sumit's political thriller Master premiered at the Sydney Film Festival, where it was selected as the only Bangladeshi film among five South Asian entries.

== Background ==
Sumit studied filmmaking at New York University Tisch School of the Arts.
