= Eastern Panorama =

Indian news magazine

- Executive Editor: Harsh Jhunjhunwala
- Staff writers: D. Nampui
- Categories: News magazine
- Frequency: Monthly
- Circulation: 1,000,000
- Publisher: Megha Ads (P) Ltd
- Founder: K. K. Jhunjhunwala
- Founded: 1992
- First issue: April 1992
- Company: Hill Publications
- Country: India
- Based in: Shillong
- Language: English
- Website: Eastern Panorama Online
- OCLC: 30147608

Eastern Panorama is a monthly news magazine started in April 1992, by Dr. K. K. Jhunjhunwala and published from Shillong, the capital city of Meghalaya, India. It has since then been regularly published, without any break, and has been disseminating news, events, views, and concerns of the people of the region.

== Profile ==
Eastern Panorama is published by Hill Publications Private Limited, Shillong. Starting in the year 1992, the magazine is reported to have the highest circulation of any magazine in the Northeast India, with an estimated readership of ten lakhs. The magazine also has an online edition, launched later. It is known to have covered a number of controversies such as Lottery scam and the Karbi Anglong massacre and has covered issues like induction of the Meitei language in the sixth schedule of the Constitution of India, insurgency, influx and corruption. It claims to be the first magazine in the region to report about the insurgents of the region including United Liberation Front of Assam (ULFA) and NSCN and bring up the debate on the issue of Uranium Mining in the region.

Eastern Panorama Group of Publications have also launched a women's magazine, Women's Panorama, the first copy released on 11 November 2011 by the filmmaker, Manju Bora. The launching was originally scheduled for 7 November 2011 but was postponed due to the death of Bhupen Hazarika, a renowned singer from Assam. The magazine is noted to be the first women's magazine in English to be published from North East India. Sonata Dkhar is the Editor of the magazine and Harsh Jhunjhunwala remains the Editor in Chief.

== Achiever's Award ==
The magazine has instituted an annual award, Achiever's Award, starting from 2013, to honour individual and collective achievements in any field. The winners of the 2014 edition are:

- Tetseo Sisters of Nagaland - Music
- Martin Luther Christian University - Education
- State Bank of India - Banking
- Wansuk Myrthong (Meghalaya) and Anshu Jamsempa (Arunachal Pradesh) - Adventure Sports
- Sumar Sing Sawian (Meghalaya) - Cultural Promotion
- Shankar Lal Goenka (Jeevan Ram Moongi Devi Public Charitable Trust, Shillong) - NGO
- Utpal Baruah (UB Photos, Guwahait) - Photography
- GVK EMRI’s 108 Service - Social Service
- Chandan Bora - Rural Entrepreneurship
