= Rehana Maryam Noor =

2021 Bangladeshi film

- Title Poster
- Bengali: রেহানা মরিয়ম নূর
- Directed by: Abdullah Mohammad Saad
- Written by: Abdullah Mohammad Saad
- Produced by: Ehsanul Haque(Babu); Jeremy Chua; Rajib Mohajan; Sydul Haque Khandaker; Ali Afjal Uzzal; Adnan Habib; Tuhin Tamijul
- Starring: Azmeri Haque Badhon; Afia Jahin Jaima; Kazi Sami Hasan; Afia Tabassum Borno; Zopari Lushai; Yasir Al Haq; Saberi Alam
- Cinematography: Tuhin Tamijul
- Edited by: Abdullah Mohammad Saad
- Production companies: Potocol; Metro Video
- Distributed by: Films Boutiques
- Release dates: 7 July 2021 (Cannes); 12 November 2021 (Bangladesh)
- Running time: 107 minutes
- Country: Bangladesh
- Language: Bangla

Rehana Maryam Noor (Bengali: রেহানা মরিয়ম নূর) is a 2021 Bangladeshi film. The film is directed by Abdullah Mohammad Saad and produced under the banner of Metro Video and co-produced by Sensemakers Productions. The film is about the struggling life of a 37-year-old assistant professor of a medical college. It was internationally distributed by German-based sales and distribution company Films Boutique.

In 2021, it was selected in the Un Certain Regard section at the 2021 Cannes Film Festival. It was the first Bangladeshi film to be featured in this category. It was selected as the Bangladeshi entry for the Best International Feature Film at the 94th Academy Awards. Rehana Maryam Noor bagged two awards at Asia Pacific Screen Awards. The director of the film Abdullah Mohammad Saad bagged the Jury Grand Prize and actress Azmeri Haque Badhon bagged award in Best Performance by an Actress category.

== Plot ==
The screenplay of the film is based on Rehana Maryam Noor, a 37-year-old teacher in a private medical college. Rehana is accustomed to living a difficult life as a mother, daughter, sister, and teacher. She witnessed an unexpected incident while leaving college one evening. Since then, she has spoken out on behalf of her medical college student against another fellow teacher in protest of the incident. And when she went to protest, she gradually became stubborn. Later, at the same time, the school authorities mistreated Rehana's 6-year-old daughter. In such a situation, Rehana continued to seek justice for her child and that student from outside the so-called rules of the school.

== Cast ==
- Azmeri Haque Badhon
- Afia Jahin Jaima
- Kazi Sami Hasan
- Afia Tabassum Borno
- Yasir Al Haq
- Saberi Alam

== Release and reception ==
Rehana Mariam Noor premiered in the Un Certain Regard section at the 2021 Cannes Film Festival and received a standing ovation. It has created a positive buzz among the audience and the critics. The Hollywood Reporter described Rehana Mariam Noor on the bottom line of the review as "a tightly woven psychological portrait bound to incite controversy". Screen Daily wrote in their review: "the film derives a magnetic continuity, and an unsettling range of dynamics, from Haque Badhon's performance". The film has been selected for the debate section of the 65th British Film Institute of London Film Festival. Rehana Maryam Noor has been set to release in 12 cinema halls across Bangladesh on 12 November 2021. OTT platform Chorki released this film worldwide on 30 December 2021. Actress Azmeri Haque Badhon won the Hong Kong Asian Film Festival (HKAFF) award in the New Talent category for her performance in this film.

== Awards ==
Award Title	Category	Awardee	Result	Ref
Asia Pacific Screen Awards	Jury Grand Prize	Abdullah Mohammad Saad	Won	
Asia Pacific Screen Awards	Best Performance (Actress)	Azmeri Haque Badhon	Won	
Meril-Prothom Alo Awards	Best Film		Won	
Meril-Prothom Alo Awards	Best Actress	Azmeri Haque Badhon	Won	

== See also ==
- Matir Moyna
- List of submissions to the 94th Academy Awards for Best International Feature Film
- List of Bangladeshi submissions for the Academy Award for Best International Feature Film
