= Bangladesh National Film Award for Best Film =

Bangladesh Film Awards

National Film Award for Best Film
- Awarded for: Excellence in cinematic achievements for Bangladeshi cinema
- Sponsored by: Government of Bangladesh
- Location: Dhaka
- Country: Bangladesh
- Presented by: Ministry of Information
- First award: 1975 (1st)
- Final award: 2023 (48th)
- Currently held by: Sharif Ul Anwar Sazzan – Saatao

Highlights
- Most awards: Impress Telefilm Limited - Faridur Reza Sagar (9 awards)
- First winner: Narayan Ghosh Mita, Lathial (1975)
- Website: moi.gov.bd

The Bangladesh National Award for Best Film (officially National Award Best Film Bengali: জাতীয় চলচ্চিত্র পুরস্কার শ্রেষ্ঠ চলচ্চিত্র) is one of the categories in the National Film Awards presented annually by the Department of Films and Publications, the organisation set up by Ministry of Information in Bangladesh. It is the highest award for films in Bangladesh. This award goes to the producers of the film and is the only category in a year. The award comprises a medal, a certificate, and a cash prize of ৳50,000.

Lathial, produced and directed by Narayan Ghosh Mita, won the first National Film Awards for Best Film in 1975. Chashi Nazrul Islam and Tauquir Ahmed are the most honoured directors, they both have three films—Shuvoda (1986), Padma Meghna Jamuna (1991), Hason Raja (2002); and Joyjatra (2004), Daruchini Dip (2007), Oggatonama (2016) respectively won the award. Followed by Sheikh Niamat Ali, Amjad Hossain and Morshedul Islam, Tanvir Mokammel (two each).

Since 2019, the award has given jointly to two films.

== List of winners ==
Key

Symbol	Meaning
†	Indicates a joint award for that year

Year (Note: Denotes The year in which the film was censored by Bangladesh Film Censor Board.)	Film(s)	Producer(s)	Director(s)	Ref.
1975 (1st)	Lathial	Narayan Ghosh Mita	Narayan Ghosh Mita	
1976 (2nd)	Megher Onek Rong	Anwar Ashraf	Harunur Rashid	
1977 (3rd)	Bosundhora	Subhash Dutta	Subhash Dutta	
1978 (4th)	Golapi Ekhon Traine	Amjad Hossain	Amjad Hossain	
1979 (5th)	Surjo Dighol Bari	Masihuddin Shaker; Sheikh Niamat Ali	Masihuddin Shaker; Sheikh Niamat Ali	
1980 (6th)	Emiler Goenda Bahini	Badal Rahman	Badal Rahman	
1981	No Award			
1982 (7th)	Not Given			
1983 (8th)	Puroskar	Satya Saha	C. B. Zaman	
1984 (9th)	Bhat De	Abu Zafar Khan	Amjad Hossain	
1985 (10th)	Not Given			
1986 (11th)	Shuvoda	AKM Jahangir Khan	Chashi Nazrul Islam	
1987 (12th)	Rajlakshmi Srikanta	Bulbul Ahmed	Bulbul Ahmed	
1988 (13th)	Dui Jibon	Suchona Films	Abdullah al Mamun	
1989 (14th)	Not Given			
1990 (15th)	Goriber Bou	S.S. Productions	Kamal Ahmed	
1991 (16th)	Padma Meghna Jamuna	Mohammad Iqbal Hossain	Chashi Nazrul Islam	
1992 (17th)	Shonkhonil Karagar	Government of Bangladesh	Mustafizur Rahman	
1993 (18th)	Padma Nadir Majhi	Habibur Rahman Khan	Goutam Ghose	
1994 (19th) †	Desh Premik	Sheikh Mujibur Rahman	Kazi Hayat	
1994 (19th) †	Aguner Poroshmoni	Nuhash Chalachitra – Humayun Ahmed	Humayun Ahmed	
1995 (20th)	Anya Jibon	Sheikh Niamat Ali	Sheikh Niamat Ali	
1996 (21st)	Poka Makorer Ghor Bosoti	Bobita	Akhtaruzzaman	
1997 (22nd)	Dukhai	Morshedul Islam	Morshedul Islam	
1998 (23nd)	Not Given			
1999 (24th)	Chitra Nodir Pare	Tanvir Mokammel	Tanvir Mokammel	
2000 (25th)	Kittonkhola	Impress Telefilm Limited - Faridur Reza Sagar	Abu Sayeed	
2000 (25th)	Kittonkhola	Aangik Communications - Abu Sayeed	Abu Sayeed	
2001 (26th)	Lalsalu	Tanvir Mokammel	Tanvir Mokammel	
2002 (27th)	Hason Raja	Helal Khan	Chashi Nazrul Islam	
2003 (28th)	Not Given			
2004 (29th)	Joyjatra	Nokkhotro Films - Tauquir Ahmed	Tauquir Ahmed	
2004 (29th)	Joyjatra	Impress Telefilm Limited - Faridur Reza Sagar	Tauquir Ahmed	
2005 (30th)	Hajar Bachhor Dhore	Shuchanda	Shuchanda	
2006 (31st)	Ghani	Kazi Morshed	Kazi Morshed	
2007 (32nd)	Daruchini Dip	Impress Telefilm Limited - Faridur Reza Sagar	Tauquir Ahmed	
2008 (33rd)	Chandragrohon	Azom Faruk	Murad Parvez	
2009 (34th)	Monpura	Anjan Chowdhury Pintu	Giasuddin Selim	
2010 (35th)	Gohine Shobdo	Impress Telefilm Limited - Faridur Reza Sagar	Khalid Mahmood Mithu	
2011 (36th)	Guerrilla	Esha Yousuff	Nasiruddin Yousuff	
2011 (36th)	Guerrilla	Impress Telefilm Limited - Faridur Reza Sagar	Nasiruddin Yousuff	
2012 (37th)	Uttarer Sur	Impress Telefilm Limited - Faridur Reza Sagar	Shahnewaz Kakoli	
2013 (38th)	Mrittika Maya	Gazi Rakayet	Gazi Rakayet	
2013 (38th)	Mrittika Maya	Impress Telefilm Limited - Faridur Reza Sagar	Gazi Rakayet	
2014 (39th)	Nekabborer Mohaproyan	Masud Pathik	Masud Pathik	
2015 (40th) †	Bapjaner Bioscope	Reazul Mawla Rezu	Reazul Mawla Rezu	
2015 (40th) †	Anil Bagchir Ekdin	Morshedul Islam	Morshedul Islam	
2016 (41st)	Oggatonama	Impress Telefilm Limited - Faridur Reza Sagar	Tauquir Ahmed	
2017 (42nd)	Dhaka Attack	Kaiser Ahammed and Sunny Sanwar	Dipankar Dipon	
2018 (43rd)	Putro	Department of Films and Publications, Ministry of Information	Saiful Islam Mannu	
2019 (44th) †	No Dorai	Mahbubur Rahman	Taneem Rahman Angshu	
2019 (44th) †	Fagun Haway	Faridur Reza Sagar	Tauquir Ahmed	
2020 (45th) †	Gor	Gazi Rakayet and Faridur Reza Sagar	Gazi Rakayet	
2020 (45th) †	Bishwoshundori	Anjan Chowdhury	Chayanika Chowdhury	
2021 (46th) †	Laal Moroger Jhuti	Matia Banu Shuku	Nurul Alam Atique	
2021 (46th) †	Nonajoler Kabbo	Rezwan Shahriar Sumit	Rezwan Shahriar Sumit	
2022 (47th) †	Kura Pokkhir Shunne Ura	Mohammad Qayyum	Mohammad Qayyum	
2022 (47th) †	Poran	Md Tamzid Ul Alam	Raihan Rafi	
2023 (48th)	Saatao	Khandaker Sumon	Khandaker Sumon	

== Individuals with multiple wins ==
9 wins

- Faridur Reza Sagar

2 wins

- Sheikh Niamat Ali
- Tanvir Mokammel
- Morshedul Islam

== Production companies with multiple wins ==
Production Company	Wins
Impress Telefilm Limited	9

== See also ==
- Bangladesh National Film Award for Best Short Film
- Bangladesh National Film Award for Best Director

== Sources ==
- BFDC (2012). "List of National Film Award recipients name 1975-2012" (PDF). Bangladesh Film Development Corporation (in Bengali). Dhaka: Ministry of Information (Bangladesh). pp. 1–23. Archived from the original (PDF) on 1 November 2020.
- BFDC (2013). "National Film Award 2013". Bangladesh Film Development Corporation (in Bengali). Dhaka: Ministry of Information (Bangladesh). Archived from the original on 18 September 2020.
- BFDC (2014). "National Film Award 2014". Bangladesh Film Development Corporation (in Bengali). Dhaka: Ministry of Information (Bangladesh). Archived from the original on 18 September 2020.
- BFDC (2015). "National Film Award 2015" (PDF). Bangladesh Film Development Corporation (in Bengali). Dhaka: Ministry of Information (Bangladesh).
- BFDC (2016). "National Film Award 2016" (PDF). Bangladesh Film Development Corporation (in Bengali). Dhaka: Ministry of Information (Bangladesh).
- BFDC (2018). "National Film Award 2017-2018" (PDF). Bangladesh Film Development Corporation (in Bengali). Dhaka: Ministry of Information (Bangladesh). Archived (PDF) from the original on 1 November 2020.
- BFDC (2020). "National Film Award 2019" (PDF). Bangladesh Film Development Corporation (in Bengali). Dhaka: Ministry of Information (Bangladesh). Archived (PDF) from the original on 5 December 2020.
