= Bangladesh National Film Award for Best Director =

National Film Award for Best Director
- The 2023 recipient: Khandaker Sumon
- Awarded for: Excellence in cinematic achievements for Bangladeshi cinema
- Sponsored by: Government of Bangladesh
- Location: Dhaka
- Country: Bangladesh
- Presented by: Ministry of Information
- First award: 1975 (1st)
- Final award: 2023 (48th)
- Currently held by: Khandaker Sumon

Highlights
- Most awards: A. J. Mintu (4 wins)
- First winner: Narayan Ghosh Mita (1975)
- Website: moi.gov.bd

National Film Award for Best Director (Bengali: জাতীয় চলচ্চিত্র পুরস্কার) is the highest award for film directors in Bangladesh, presented annually at Bangladesh National Film Awards ceremony by the Ministry of Information. It is given in honour of a film director who has exhibited excellence directing in Bangladeshi cinema. Since 1975, the award is given annually except in 1981, 1998 and 2003. It is presented by the President of Bangladesh at a ceremony held in Dhaka.

The 1st National Film Awards ceremony was held in 1976, and Narayan Ghosh Mita was the first awardee of this category for directing the film Lathial (1975).

Since its inception, a total of 43 awards have been given to 32 directors. A. J. Mintu has received the most awards in this category with four, following Sheikh Niamat Ali three times. 2017 best director, producer & Screenplay writer Reazul Rezu. As of the 48th ceremony in 2026 (awarded for 2023), Khandaker Sumon is the most recent winner in this category for the film Saatao (2023).

== List of winners ==
Sheikh Niamat Ali has the second most Best Director wins with three, winning in 1979, 1985, and 1995.

Abdullah al Mamun won two awards in this category for Ekhoni Somoy and Dui Jibon.

Key

Table key
indicates a joint award for that year	‡ Indicates the winner of Best Film

List of award recipients, showing the year and film(s)
Year (Note: Denotes The year in which the film was censored by Bangladesh Film Censor Board.)	Recipient(s)	Work(s)	Ref
1975 (1st)	Narayan Ghosh Mita	Lathial †	
1976 (2nd)	Harunur Rashid	Megher Onek Rong †	
1977 (3rd)	Subhash Dutta	Bosundhora †	
1978 (4th)	Amjad Hossain	Golapi Ekhon Traine †	
1979 (5th) †	Sheikh Niamat Ali	Surjo Dighol Bari †	
1979 (5th) †	Masihuddin Shaker	Surjo Dighol Bari †	
1980 (6th)	Abdullah al Mamun	Ekhoni Somoy	
1981	No Award		
1982 (7th)	Mohiuddin Ahmad	Boro Bhalo Lok Chhilo	
1983 (8th)	Kamal Ahmed	Lalu Bhulu	
1984 (9th)	Amjad Hossain	Bhat De †	
1985 (10th)	Sheikh Niamat Ali	Dahan	
1986 (11th)	Chashi Nazrul Islam	Shuvoda †	
1987 (12th)	A. J. Mintu	Lalu Mastan	
1988 (13th)	Abdullah al Mamun	Dui Jibon †	
1989 (14th)	A. J. Mintu	Satya Mithya	
1990 (15th)	Kamal Ahmed	Goriber Bou †	
1991 (16th)	A. J. Mintu	Pita Mata Santan	
1992 (17th)	Motin Rahman	Andha Biswas	
1993 (18th)	A. J. Mintu	Banglar Bodhu	
1994 (19th)	Kazi Hayat	Desh Premik †	
1995 (20th)	Sheikh Niamat Ali	Anya Jibon †	
1996 (21st)	Akhtaruzzaman	Poka Makorer Ghor Bosoti †	
1997 (22nd)	Chashi Nazrul Islam	Hangor Nodi Grenade	
1998 (23nd)	Not Given		
1999 (24th)	Tanvir Mokammel	Chitra Nodir Pare †	
2000 (25th)	Abu Sayeed	Kittonkhola †	
2001 (26th)	Tanvir Mokammel	Lalsalu †	
2002 (27th)	Kazi Hayat	Itihas	
2003 (28th)	Not Given		
2004 (29th)	Tauquir Ahmed	Joyjatra †	
2005 (30th)	Kohinur Akter Suchanda	Hajar Bachhor Dhore †	
2006 (31st)	Kazi Morshed	Ghani	
2007 (32nd)	Enamul Karim Nirjhar	Aha!	
2008 (33rd)	Murad Parvez	Chandragrohon †	
2009 (34th)	Syed Wahiduzzaman Diamond	Gangajatra	
2010 (35th)	Khalid Mahmud Mithu	Gohine Shobdo †	
2011 (36th)	Nasiruddin Yousuff	Guerrilla †	
2012 (37th)	Humayun Ahmed	Ghetuputra Komola	
2013 (38th)	Gazi Rakayet	Mrittika Maya †	
2014 (39th)	Zahidur Rahman Anjan	Meghmallar	
2015 (40th) †	Reazul Mawla Rezu	Bapjaner Bioscope †	
2015 (40th) †	Morshedul Islam	Anil Bagchir Ekdin †	
2016 (41st)	Amitabh Reza Chowdhury	Aynabaji	
2017 (42nd)	Badrul Anam Saud	Gohin Baluchor	
2018 (43rd)	Mostafizur Rahman Manik	Jannat	
2019 (44th)	Taneem Rahman Angshu	No Dorai	
2020 (45th)	Gazi Rakayet	Gor (The Grave)	
2021 (46th)	Rezwan Shahriar Sumit	Nonajoler Kabbo	
2022 (47th)	Rubaiyat Hossain	Shimu	
2023 (48th)	Khandaker Sumon	Saatao	

== Multiple wins ==
The following individuals have won multiple Best Director awards:

Wins	Director
4	A. J. Mintu
3	Sheikh Niamat Ali
2	Abdullah al Mamun
2	Amjad Hossain
2	Chashi Nazrul Islam
2	Kamal Ahmed
2	Kazi Hayat
2	Tanvir Mokammel
2	Gazi Rakayet

== See also ==
- Bangladesh National Film Award for Best Film

== Sources ==
- BFDC (2012). "List of National Film Award recipients name 1975-2012" (PDF). Bangladesh Film Development Corporation (in Bengali). Dhaka: Ministry of Information (Bangladesh). pp. 1–23. Archived from the original (PDF) on 1 November 2020.
- BFDC (2013). "National Film Award 2013". Bangladesh Film Development Corporation (in Bengali). Dhaka: Ministry of Information (Bangladesh). Archived from the original on 18 September 2020.
- BFDC (2014). "National Film Award 2014". Bangladesh Film Development Corporation (in Bengali). Dhaka: Ministry of Information (Bangladesh). Archived from the original on 18 September 2020.
- BFDC (2015). "National Film Award 2015" (PDF). Bangladesh Film Development Corporation (in Bengali). Dhaka: Ministry of Information (Bangladesh).
- BFDC (2016). "National Film Award 2016" (PDF). Bangladesh Film Development Corporation (in Bengali). Dhaka: Ministry of Information (Bangladesh).
- BFDC (2018). "National Film Award 2017-2018" (PDF). Bangladesh Film Development Corporation (in Bengali). Dhaka: Ministry of Information (Bangladesh). Archived (PDF) from the original on 1 November 2020.
- BFDC (2020). "National Film Award 2019" (PDF). Bangladesh Film Development Corporation (in Bengali). Dhaka: Ministry of Information (Bangladesh). Archived (PDF) from the original on 5 December 2020.
