= Sheikh Sadi Khan discography =

Sheikh Sadi Khan (born 1950) is a Bangladeshi music director. He has composed for 29 films. The following is a list of films he scored:

== 1970s ==
Year	Film	Notes
1978	Ashami Hajir	

== 1980s ==
Year	Film	Notes
1980	Ekhoni Somoy	
1981	Kalmi Lata	
1983	Ferari Basanta	Winner: Bachsas Award for Best Music Director
1984	Bongshodhor	
1984	Lal Memsaheb	
1984	Princess Tina Khan	
1985	Mahanayak	
1986	Parineeta	
1987	Bhagyoboti	
1987	Protirodh	
1988	Hushiyar	
1989	Takdirer Khela	
1989	Achol Bondi	

== 1990s ==
Year	Film	Notes
1992	Chakor	
1992	Traas	
1993	Prem Deewana	
1994	Disco Dancer	
1995	Babar Adesh	
1997	Hangor Nodi Grenade	
1997	Komolar Bonobas	
1997	Poka Makorer Ghor Bosoti	Winner: Bachsas Award for Best Music Director

== 2000s ==
Year	Film	Notes
2000	Uttarer Khep	
2002	Sei Raater Kotha Bolte Esechi	documentary short film
2006	Ghani	Winner: Bangladesh National Film Award for Best Music Director
2009	Chhana O Muktijuddho	

== 2010s ==
Year	Film	Notes
2012	Raja Surjo Kha	
2013	Ekee Britte	

== 2020s ==
Year	Film	Notes

== Year unknown ==
Film	Notes
Amar Bhalobasha	

== Background score only ==
Year	Film	Composer	Notes
1995	Shilpi	Subal Das	
2004	Ek Khondo Jomi	Shahbuddin Nagri	
2010	Bhalobaslei Ghor Bandha Jay Na	Ali Akram Shuvo	Winner: Bangladesh National Film Award for Best Music Composer

== Non-film albums ==
Year	Album	Songs	Lyricist	Artist
2016	Koto Phool Jhore Gechhe	All 10 songs were composed by him	N/A	Paoshi
2020	Single	"Amar Moner Akashe Aaj"	N/A	Imran Mahmudul

== As lyricist ==
Year	Film	Composer(s)	Notes
