= 48th Bangladesh National Film Awards =

National Film Awards, Bangladesh

- Awarded for: Best of Bangladeshi cinema in 2023
- Awarded by: Prime minister of Bangladesh
- Presented by: Ministry of Information
- Announced on: 2 June 2026

Highlights
- Best Feature Film: Saatao
- Best Actor: Afran Nisho
- Best Actress: Aynun Nahar Putul
- Lifetime achievement: Shabnam, Fazle Haque, Tareque Masud, and Abdul Latif Bachchu
- Most awards: Surongo (9 wins)

The 48th National Film Awards will be presented by Ministry of Information, Bangladesh to felicitate the best of Bangladeshi films released in the calendar year 2023.

== Jury board ==
On 15 September 2024, a 13-member jury board, chaired by the additional secretary (film) of the Ministry of Information and Broadcasting, was announced. The vice chairman of the now defunct Bangladesh Film Censor Board will serve as the member secretary, and the director general of the Bangladesh Film Archive and the head of the film division of the Ministry of Information and Broadcasting will also serve on the board. Others include actor Ilias Kanchan, director Zahidur Rahman Anjan, music director Prince Mahmud, cinematographer Barkat Hossain Polash, actress Aupee Karim, singer Nazmun Munira Nancy, S M Imran Hossain, the chair of the Department of Television, Film, and Photography at the University of Dhaka, and journalist Wahid Sujan.

On 23 September 2024, Kanchan resigned from the jury board, citing his shortage of time and other commitments.

On 4 November 2024, the government reconstituted the jury board, adding film director Saidur Rahman Sayeed, music director Maksud Jamil Mintu, actor Khawaja Naeem Murad, and actress Shuchorita and dropping Zahidur Rahman Anjan, Prince Mahmud, and Aupee Karim.

== Decisions ==
On 3 June 2026, the ministry issued a revised gazette with changes to the Lifetime Achievement and Best Screenplay categories following a review of the originally announced results. Actress Shabnam and film editor Fazle Haque would receive the Lifetime Achievement award dropping filmmaker Tareque Masud and cinematographer-director Abdul Latif Bachchu since the award is intended for living recipients. Niamul Mukta was first named for the Best Screenplay award for the film Roktojoba, but after concerns were raised regarding the authorship of the screenplay, the ministry replaced that selection with Tasneemul Hasan.

On 4 June 2026, the ministry announced the final decision, selecting 32 artistes and technicians in 28 categories for their contributions to the country's film industry.

== Lifetime Achievement ==
Award	Winner(s)	Awarded As
Lifetime Achievement	Shabnam	Actress
Lifetime Achievement	Fazle Haque	Film editor
Lifetime Achievement	Tareque Masud	Filmmaker (posthumously)
Lifetime Achievement	Abdul Latif Bachchu	Cinematographer-director (posthumously)

== List of winners ==
Award	Winner(s)	Film
Best Film	Khandaker Sumon	Saatao
Best Short Film		Mariam
Best Documentary Film		Lilaboti Nag: The Rebel
Best Director	Khandaker Sumon	Saatao
Best Actor	Afran Nisho	Surongo
Best Actress	Aynun Nahar Putul	Saatao
Best Supporting Actor	Monir Ahmed Shakeel	Surongo
Best Supporting Actress	Nazia Haque Orsha	Ora 7 Jon
Best Actor/Actress in Negative Role	Ashish Khondokar	Adventure of Sundarbans
Best Actor/Actress in Comedy Role	Shahiduzzaman Selim	Surongo
Best Child Artist	Mohammad Leon	Aam Kathaler Chhuti
Best Child Artist in Special Category	Arif Hasan Anaira Khan	Aam Kathaler Chhuti
Best Music Director	Emon Chowdhury	Adventure of Sundarbans
Best Choreographer	Habibur Rahman	Lal Shari
Best Male Playback Singer	Balam	Priyotoma
Best Female Playback Singer	Abanti Sithi	Surongo
Best Lyrics	Shomeshwar Oli	Priyotoma
Best Music Composer	Prince Mahmud	Priyotoma
Best Story	Faruk Hossain	Priyotoma
Best Screenplay	Muhammad Tasneemul Hasan	Roktojoba
Best Dialogue	Raihan Rafi; Nazim Ud Daula	Surongo
Best Editing	Mohammad Salah Uddin Ahmed Babu	Ora 7 Jon
Best Art Direction	Shahidul Islam	Surongo
Best Cinematography	Suman Kumar Sarkar	Surongo
Best Sound Recording	Sujan Mahmud	Saatao
Best Costume and Set Design	Bithi Afrin	Surongo
Best Make-up Artist	Sabuj Khan	Priyotoma

=== Multiple wins ===
Awards	Film
9	Surongo
5	Priyotoma
4	Saatao
2	Ora 7 Jon
2	Adventure of Sundarbans
2	Aam Kathaler Chhuti
