= Bohipir =

Social drama by Syed Waliullah

Bohipir Bahipīra
- Author: Syed Waliullah
- Original title: বহিপীর
- Language: Bangla
- Subject: Pirism, superstitions
- Genre: Social drama
- Publication date: 1960
- Publication place: Bangladesh
- Followed by: Tarangabhanga (1964)

Bohipir or Bahipir (Bengali: বহিপীর, romanized: Bahipīra, lit. 'Pir from the books') is a Bengali language social drama written by Bangladeshi litterateur Syed Waliullah. It was first published in 1960 from Dhaka, East Pakistan (present-day Bangladesh). Before being published, Bohipir was awarded at a 1955 international conference of PEN Club in Dhaka.

== Characters ==
Bohipir
Bohipir is the eponymous character of the play and elderly antagonist is married to Tahera. He considers the common language to be unclean and inappropriate to bear the message of God, so he uses Sadhu bhasa and takes the name "Bohipir". His role is characterised by patience, tact, present intellect and realistic knowledge.

Tahera
Tahera is the protagonist of the play. Her superstitious father and stepmother marry her off to Bohipir, but Tahera flees from the wedding with her cousin and takes shelter in Hatem Ali's boat. The National Curriculum and Textbook Board (NCTB) states that she is portrayed as an inflexible and humanitarian character, and is considered to be an indication of women's rights and awakening in the early 20th century.

Hashem Ali
Hashem Ali is the son of Zamindar Hatem Ali and is against religious superstitions and social injustice. At the end of the play he flees with Tahera to start a new life.

Hatem Ali
Hatem Ali is a zamindar of Reshampur who is gradually losing his lands. His estate has been auctioned due to the Revenue Sale Law. He asks for money to save his estate from his friend in the city. He hides this fact from his family by pretending to be sick and tells them that they are going to the city for treatment. Bohipir tries to exploit Hatem's problem by offering money to retain control of his lands for Tahera, but Hatem refuses.

Khodeja Begum
Khodeja Begum is Hatem's wife and Hashem's mother. She is a simple, religious and superstitious lady. She sympathises with Tahera when she listens to her story, but wants to return her as she is the Pir's wife. Although she feels that the marriage was unjust, she also fears Bohipir's curse. At first she takes Bohipir's side when Hashem confronts Bohipir, but eventually supports him. The NCTB interprets Khodeja to be an icon of a universal mother in the drama.

Hokikullah
Hokikullah, or Hakikullah, is Bohipir's assistant who fulfills his master's orders.

== Background ==
Bohipir takes place in late-19th or early-20th century British Bengal. Zamindar Hatem Ali struggles against the Revenue Sale Law (commonly Bengali: সূর্যাস্ত আইন, romanized: Sūryāsta Ā'ina, lit. 'Sunset Law'), which was enacted in 1793, as zamindars began to lose control over their lands by that time. At the time, most of Bengal subscribed to pirism, narrow-mindedness and superstitions. Pirs were feared for their so-called spiritual power by even zamindars, and villagers in the Bengal region demonstrated poor judgement before Pirs. Their ignorance often led them to sacrifice their wealth and even their daughters for the service of Pirs.

The name Bohipir has a symbolic significance as pirism in the Bengali Muslim community originated from social prejudices and religious books. Mainly this Pirism was initiated through the Sufist philosophy of Islam. The name Bohipir (lit. 'Pir from the books') describes the spread of pirism from the religious interpretations and masael (explanations) to the common people.

== Theme ==
Bohipir is a play that portrays the hypocrisy and emptiness of pirism in rural Bengal. Waliullah indicated the lifelessness of bookish religious beliefs and pirist superstitions through Bohipir's speech given in Sadhu bhasa. However, the drama finally hints at an upcoming change in the social prejudice through Tahera and Hashem as they raise their voice against the system and flee together. Tahera has been portrayed as a symbol of Bengali Muslim women empowerment in the early 20th century.

== Reception ==
Syed Waliullah has been credited for discussing social stigma, inconsistency and socio-religious superstitions in literature such as Lalsalu and Bohipir. He was awarded the PEN Prize in 1955 for Bohipir. The play was included in the national curriculum of Bangladesh by the NCTB in 2013.
