= 40th Bangladesh National Film Awards =

National Film Awards, Bangladesh

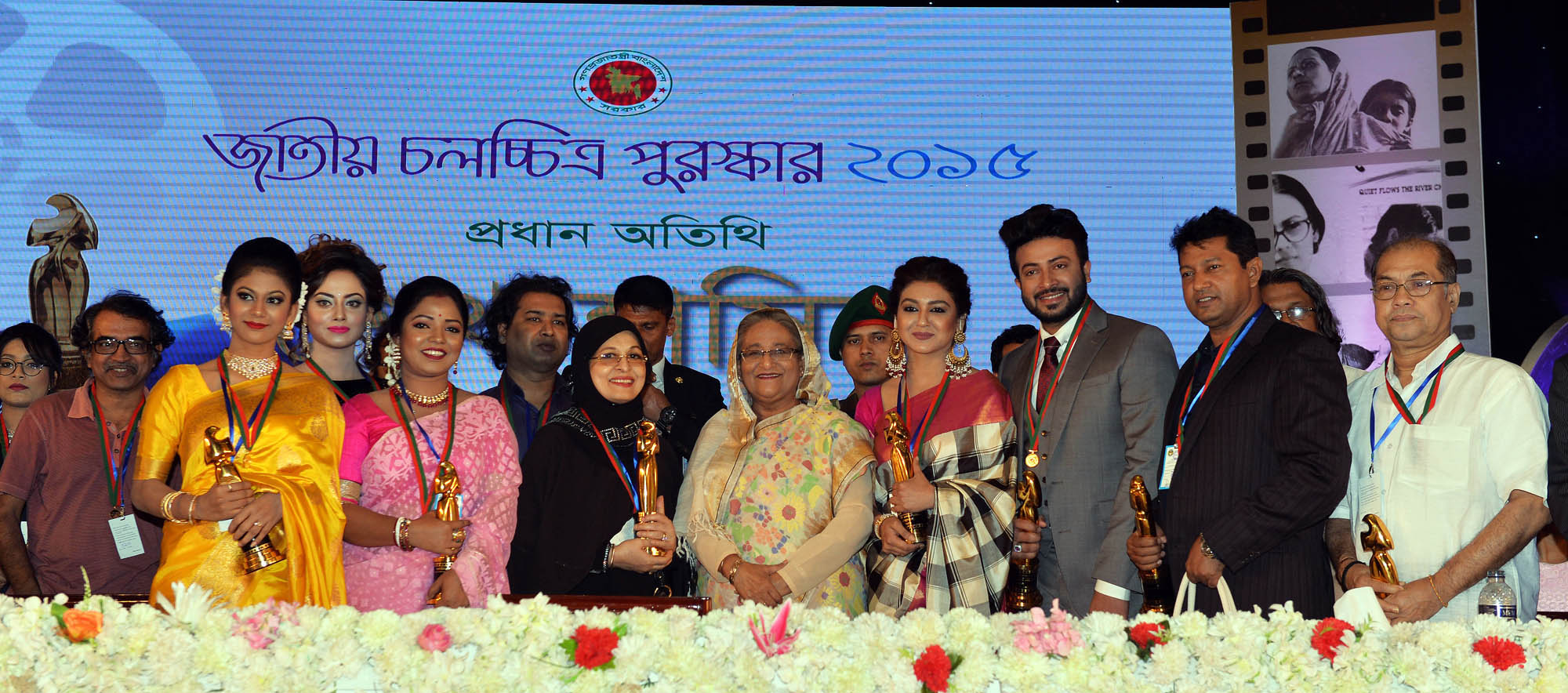
- Award ceremony held on 24 July 2017
- Awarded for: Best of Bangladeshi cinema in 2015
- Awarded by: President of Bangladesh
- Presented by: Ministry of Information
- Announced on: 18 May 2017
- Presented on: 24 July 2017
- Site: Dhaka, Bangladesh
- Official website: www.moi.gov.bd

Highlights
- Best Feature Film: Bapjaner Bioscope and Anil Bagchir Ekdin
- Best Non-feature Film: Ekttorer Ganahotya O Bodhyobhumi
- Best Actor: Shakib Khan and Mahfuz Ahmed
- Best Actress: Jaya Ahsan
- Lifetime achievement: Ferdausi Rahman and Shabana
- Most awards: Bapjaner Bioscope (9)

The 40th National Film Awards was presented on 24 July 2017 by the Ministry of Information, Bangladesh to felicitate the best of Bangladeshi films released in the year 2015. The awards were given to 29 personnel in 26 categories.

== List of winners ==
Name of Awards	Winner(s)	Film
Lifetime Achievement Award	Ferdausi Rahman and Shabana	
Best Film		Bapjaner Bioscope; Anil Bagchir Ekdin
Best Documentary Film		Ekttorer Ganahotya O Bodhyobhumi
Best Director	Reazul Mawla Rezu; Morshedul Islam	Bapjaner Bioscope; Anil Bagchir Ekdin
Best Actor	Shakib Khan; Mahfuz Ahmed	Aro Bhalobasbo Tomay; Zero Degree
Best Actress	Jaya Ahsan	Zero Degree
Best Actor in a Supporting Role	Gazi Rakayet	Anil Bagchir Ekdin
Best Actress in a Supporting Role	Toma Mirza	Nodijon
Best Actor in a Negative Role	Iresh Zaker	Chuye Dile Mon
Best Child Artist	Zara Zarib; Promia Rahman	Prarthona; Prarthona
Best Music Director	Swani Zubayeer	Anil Bagchir Ekdin
Best Music Composer	S I Tutul	Bapjaner Bioscope
Best Lyricist	Amirul Islam	Bapjaner Bioscope
Best Male Playback Singer	Subir Nandi; S I Tutul	Mohua Sundori; Bapjaner Bioscope
Best Female Playback Singer	Priyanka Gope	Anil Bagchir Ekdin
Best Story	Masum Reza	Bapjaner Bioscope
Best Dialogue	Humayun Ahmed	Anil Bagchir Ekdin
Best Screenplay	Masum Reza; Reazul Rezu	Bapjaner Bioscope; Bapjaner Bioscope
Best Cinematography	Mahfuzur Rahman Khan	Padma Patar Jol
Best Art Direction	Samurai Maruf	Zero Degree
Best Editing	Mehedi Haque Rony	Bapjaner Bioscope
Best Sound Recording	Ratan Kumar Paul	Zero Degree
Best Costume Design	Muskan Sumaika	Padma Patar Jol
Best Make-up	Shafik	Jalaler Golpo
