= Arun Saha =

Bangladeshi actor and musician

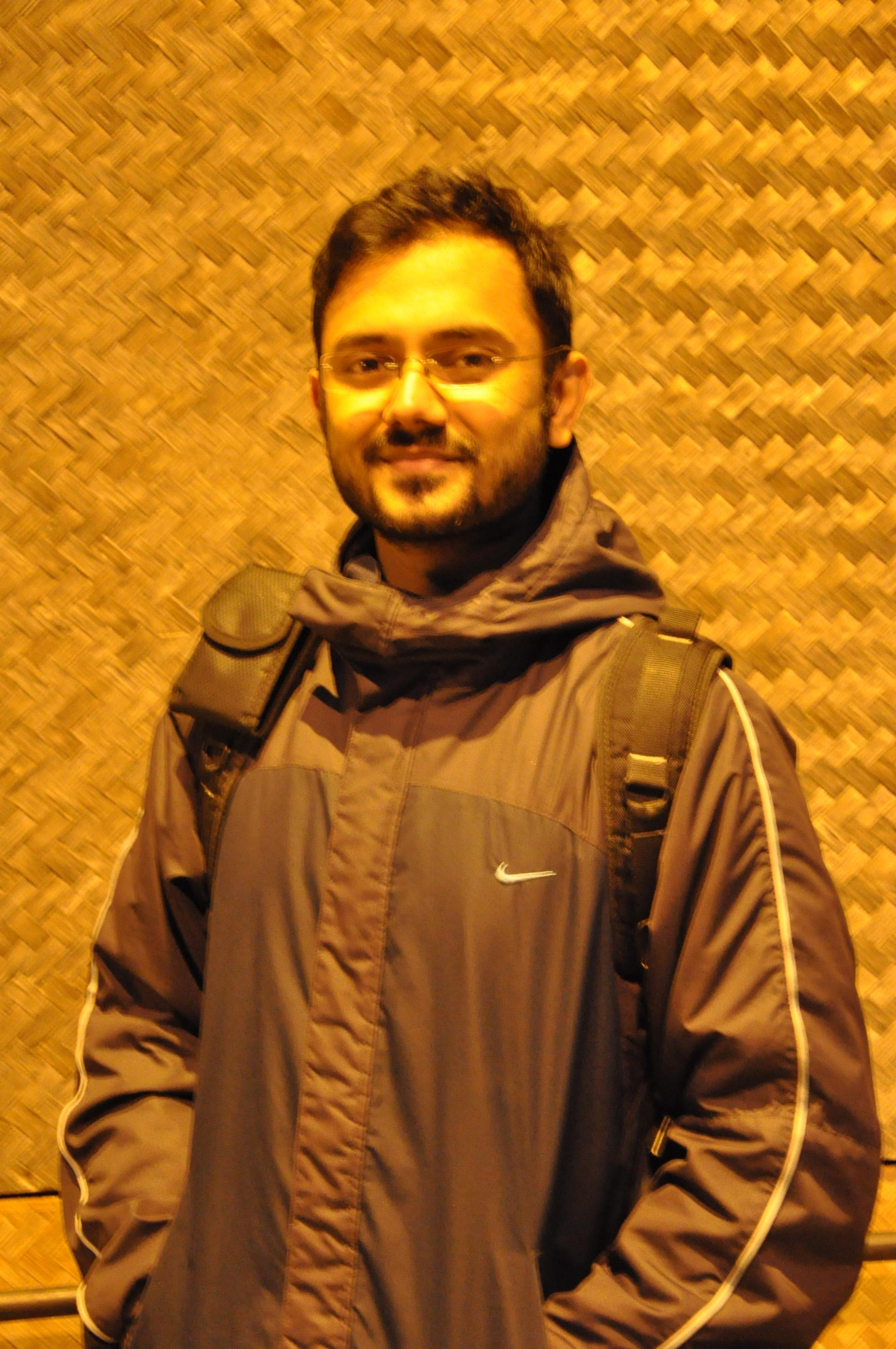
- Saha in 2014
- Born: Arun Kumar Saha; 9 November 1983 (age 42); Dhaka, Bangladesh
- Citizenship: Bangladesh
- Education: University of Delhi; University of Dhaka
- Occupations: Actor; Musician; Oil–worker
- Years active: 1996 – present (intermittent)
- Height: 5 ft 9 in (1.75 m)
- Spouse: Sraboni Somadder (m. 2014)
- Awards: Bangladesh National Film Award

Signature
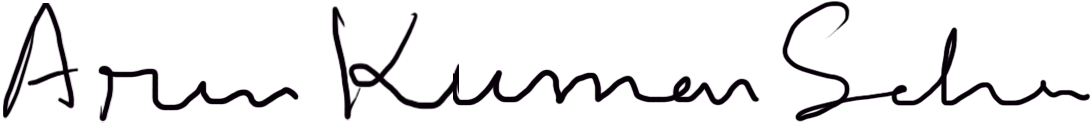

Arun Kumar Saha (born 9 November 1983) is a Bangladeshi actor and musician. He became known as a child actor for his role as Dipu in the full-length Bangla film Dipu Number Two (1996), directed by Morshedul Islam. He has received several awards, including the National Film Award as Best Child Actor.

== Early life and education ==
Saha attended St. Joseph High School in Dhaka. Later he attended Notre Dame College in Dhaka, and passed his HSC examination. In 2006, Saha graduated from the University of Delhi, India, with a BE degree in electrical engineering. In 2014, he earned a MS degree from the University of Dhaka in renewable energy technology.

== Filmography ==
Saha developed an interest in acting at an early age. In his childhood, he was inspired by a theatrical play, "Tomrai", written by the playwright Abdullah al Mamun. He was also a big fan of Hollywood action movies, which inspired him to be an actor. In 1995 the film director, Morshedul Islam, announced an audition for the casting of his next film Dipu Number Two. Dipu Number Two was a government funded, full-length feature film being made especially for a younger population. Despite having no prior experience, Saha was chosen as the protagonist. He rose to national fame with his lead role as Dipu in the film when it was released in 1996, presenting a natural portrayal of the vicissitudes of adolescent life. The film was selected for screening at the Focus on Fukuoka International Film Festival, held in Japan in 1998, which Saha and his director, Shubhashis, attended.

Later, he received a National Film Award as best child performer.

After a lengthy break from acting, he made an appearance in a telefilm and a television commercial in 2015.

== Career ==
From 2006 to 2010, Saha worked in the petroleum sector as a wireline logging field engineer for HLS Asia Limited and Weatherford International. During his tenure, he was posted at various locations in India, Bangladesh, Germany and the U.A.E.

== Music ==
Saha is also a musician. Saha learned to play classical guitar from noted Bosnian classical guitarist Denis Azabagic (in India) and Iftekhar Anwar (in Bangladesh). Saha is a self-taught trumpeter. He has performed with the Classical Music Academy of Dhaka in different venues, such as the Bangladesh Shilpakala Academy's National Academy of Fine and Performing Arts (or Chhayanaut).

Since 2013, Saha performs regularly in two Bangladesh Television programs, Oikyotan & Chrio Shilper Bari.

== Advertising model ==
Year	Advertisement	Director	Note
2015	Okapia Mobile	Saraf Ahmed Zibon	First Appearance in a Commercial

== Films ==
Year	Film	Director	Note
1996	Dipu Number Two	Morshedul Islam	First Movie Appearance

== Awards ==
Year	Type	Award	Film	Director	Result
1996	Best Child Actor (Arun Saha)	National Film Award	Dipu Number Two	Morshedul Islam	Won
