= Fakhrul Hasan Boiragi =

Bangladeshi actor

- Born: 1950 (age 75–76)
- Spouse: Razia Hassan

Fakhrul Hasan Boiragi is a Bangladesh actor and director who has acted in films and TV dramas and worked as assistant director in movies like Ki Je Kori (1976), Razia Sultana (1984), Prem Juddho (1994) and acted in films like Surjo Dighol Bari (1979), Suruj Mia (1984), Dahan (1985) and Moroner Pore (1990) etc. On 7 August 2016, his wife Razia Hassan filed a missing diary as he was missing for 40 days. Later, he was rescued.

== Awards ==
- Bachsas Award for Best Supporting Actor - 1984 for Suruj Mia

== Filmography ==
Director

- Seyana (1976)
- Kar Pape (1979)
- Manosi (1982)
- Setu Bandhan (1987)
- Shopno (1991)
- Shudhu Tomari (1995)
