= Dolly Anwar =

Bangladeshi actress (1948–1991)

- ডলি আনোয়ার
- Born: Dolly Ibrahim; 1 July 1948; Bangladesh
- Died: 3 July 1991 (aged 43); Dhaka, Bangladesh
- Cause of death: Suicide
- Resting place: Martyred Intellectuals Graveyard, Mirpur
- Education: University of Dhaka
- Occupation: Actress
- Years active: 1964 – 1991
- Notable work: Surja Dighal Bari (1979)
- Spouse: Anwar Hossain (m. 1979, divorced)
- Parent(s): Nilima Ibrahim (mother), Muhammad Ibrahim (father)

Dolly Anwar (née Ibrahim; 1 July 1948 – 3 July 1991) was a Bangladeshi stage, television and film actress and writer and editor of Saatdin magazine. She was awarded Bangladesh National Film Award for Best Actress for her role in the film Surjo Dighol Bari (1979).

== Early life ==
Anwar was the daughter of Nilima Ibrahim, a political and feminist activist, and Muhammad Ibrahim, a physician. She was an undergraduate student in literature at Jagannath College.

== Career ==
Anwar began her career on stage at the age of 13. At 16, she acted in Aktala Dotala by Munier Choudhury and Roj Roj(1981), the first play and the first drama serial respectively on Bangladesh Television. She later acted in Zahir Raihan's Borof Gola Nodi and Arek Phalgun plays. Her film debut was the multiple national film award-winning Surja Dighal Bari in 1979. Her second and last acted film was Dahan (1986), directed by Sheikh Niamat Ali.

Anwar left acting and started serving as the director of an advertisement agency and the editor of a weekly, Saatdin.

== Personal life and death ==
Anwar first married Raju in 1966, a student leader. She then married Anwar Hossain, a photographer, and cinematographer.

Anwar committed suicide on 3 July 1991 and died at the Dhaka Medical College and Hospital later that night.
