= Anil Bagchir Ekdin =

- Poster Of Anil Bagchir Ekdin
- Directed by: Morshedul Islam
- Written by: Humayun Ahmed
- Produced by: Bengal Creations
- Starring: Aref Syed; Jyotika Jyoti; Gazi Rakayet; Toufiq Emon; Farhana Mithu; S M Mohsin
- Cinematography: Lawrence Apu Rosario
- Music by: Swani Zubayeer
- Release date: December 11, 2015
- Running time: 120 mins
- Country: Bangladesh
- Language: Bengali

Anil Bagchir Ekdin is a 2015 Bangladeshi drama film directed by Morshedul Islam. The film was based on Humayun Ahmed's novel of the same name. It won six awards, including the awards for Best Film and Best Director (both jointly with the film Bapjaner Bioscope) at the 40th Bangladesh National Film Awards.

== Cast ==
- Aref Syed as Anil
- Jyotika Jyoti as Atoshi, sister of Anil
- Gazi Rakayet as Ayub Ali
- Toufiq Emon
- Farhana Mithu
- S M Mohsin

=== Guest appearance ===
- Misha Sawdagor

== Plot ==
Set during the turbulent days of 1971, the film follows Anil Bagchi, a timid young man in his mid-twenties who works at an insurance company in the capital. His father and sister remain in their village. One day, Anil receives a letter from a village school teacher informing him that his father has been killed by the Pakistani military. Anil sets out for the village but is captured by soldiers along the way. On a moonlit night, the soldiers take him to a riverbank to execute him. Calm and accepting of his fate, Anil quietly admires the moonlight in his final moments.

== Awards ==
2015 Bangladesh National Film Awards

- Best Film
- Best Director
- Best Actor in a Supporting Role
- Best Music Director
- Best Female Playback Singer for Priyanka Gope
- Best Dialogue

== Screenings ==
The film premiered at Star Cineplex in the capital on 13 November 2015. It has been screened at several international film festivals, including the World Film Festival in Bangkok and the Colombo International Film Festival 2015, where Anil Bagchir Ekdin had its world premiere.
