= Anwar Hossain (photographer) =

Bangladeshi photographer and cinematographer (1948–2018)

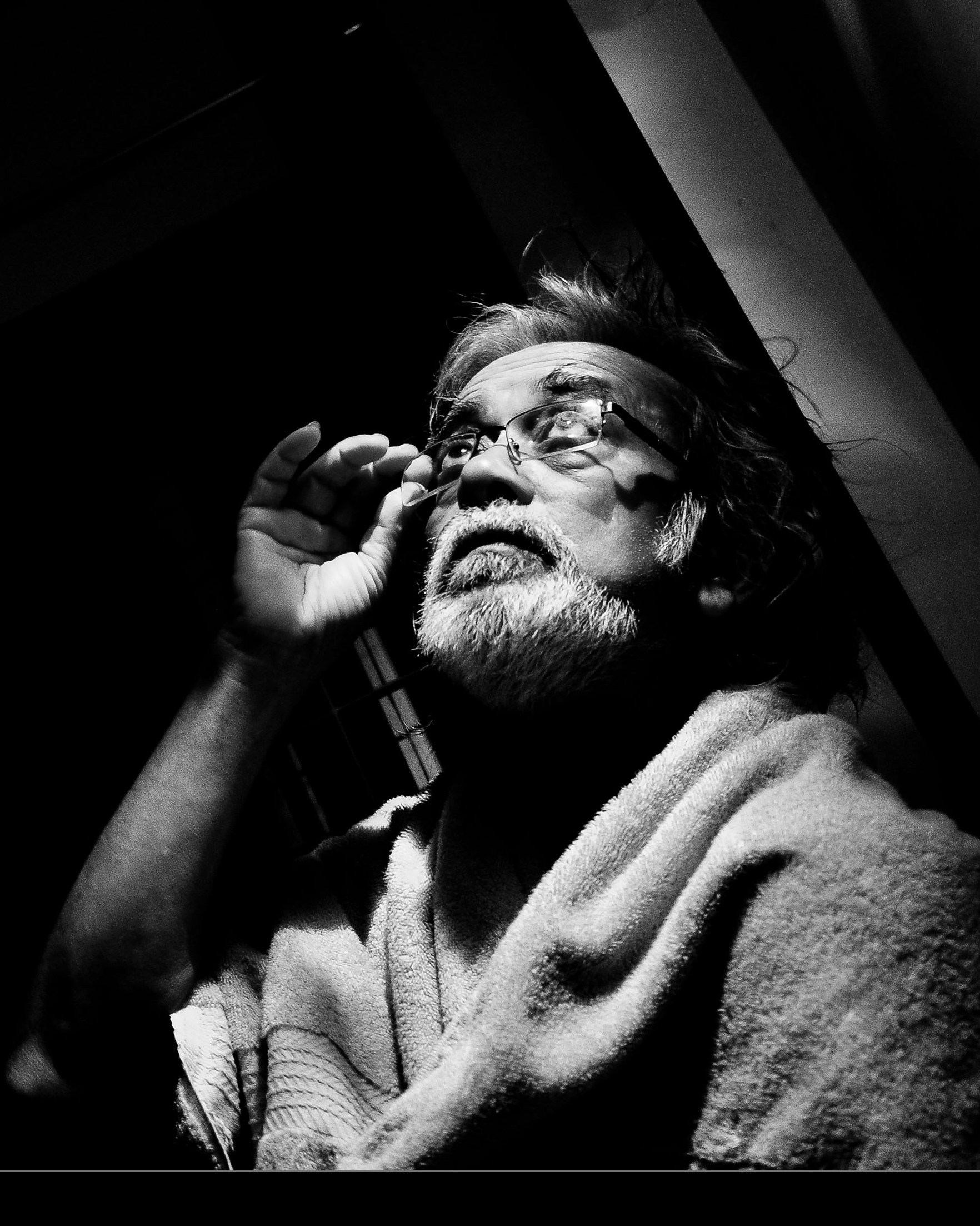
- Hossain in 2010
- Born: 6 October 1948; Dhaka, East Pakistan, Dominion of Pakistan
- Died: 1 December 2018 (aged 70); Dhaka, Bangladesh
- Citizenship: Bangladesh; France
- Education: Bangladesh University of Engineering and Technology
- Occupations: Cinematographer, photographer

Anwar Hossain (Bengali: আনোয়ার হোসেন; 6 October 1948 – 1 December 2018) was a Bangladeshi photographer and cinematographer. He won Bangladesh National Film Award for Best Cinematography a record five times for the films Sundori (1979), Emiler Goenda Bahini (1980), Puraskar (1983), Anya Jibon (1995) and Lalsalu (2003).

== Early life and education ==
Hossain was born in Old Dhaka in 1948. He completed his SSC from Armanitola Government High School and HSC from Notre Dame College, Dhaka in 1965 and 1967 respectively. He graduated in architecture from BUET and got a diploma in cinematography from the Film and Television Institute of Pune, India.

== Career ==
Hossain started his photography career in 1967. His photography captured the Liberation War of Bangladesh.

Hossain worked as a cinematographer of total 15 fictions and 30 documentary films.

== Personal life and death ==
Hossain married to Bangladeshi film actress and writer Dolly Anwar in 1979. Anwar committed suicide on 3 July 1991. Hossain migrated to France after the death of his ex-wife in 1991. In 1993, he married a French woman and had two sons together.

Hossain was found dead in the Olio Dream Haven hotel in Panthapath area in Dhaka on 1 December 2018. He had been staying at this hotel as he was serving as a judge for a local photography competition.

== Films ==
- Surja Dighal Bari (La Maison Tragique), 1979
- Emiler Goenda Bahini, 1980
- Bostrobalikara: Garment Girls of Bangladesh (TV documentary)
- Dahan 1985
- Anya Jibon 1995
- Nadir Naam Madhumati (A River Named Madhumati), 1994
- Chitra Nodir Pare (Quiet Flows the River Chitra), 1999
- Lalsalu, 2002
- Shyamol Chhaya, 2004
- Three Beauties (producer), 2006
- Swapnabhumi: The Promised Land, 2007

== Awards and honors ==
- Sole Jury, Commonwealth photo contest, Cyprus, 1980
- Principal National Jury, Bangladesh, 2008–2011
