= Suruj Mia =

Bangladeshi film

- Directed by: Kazal Arefin
- Starring: Suborna Mustafa; Tarik Anam; Fakhrul Hasan Boiragi
- Release date: 1984
- Country: Bangladesh
- Language: Bengali

Suruj Mia (Bengali: সুরুজ মিয়া) is a 1984 Bangladeshi film directed by Kazi Arefin and stars Tarik Anam, Fakhrul Hasan Boiragi and Suborna Mustafa. Boiragi earned the Bachsas Award for Best Supporting Actor in 1984 for his performance. It was displayed at a film festival in Sylhet in 2017.
