= Ankhi O Tar Bandhura =

Bangladeshi film

- Movie poster
- Directed by: Morshedul Islam
- Story by: Muhammad Zafar Iqbal
- Produced by: Morshedul Islam Faridur Reza Sagor
- Cinematography: Mahfuzur Rahman
- Edited by: Sujan Mahmud
- Music by: Swani Zubayeer
- Production company: Monon Chalachitra Impress Telefilm Limited
- Release date: 22 December 2017
- Running time: 115 Minutes
- Country: Bangladesh
- Language: Bangla

Ankhi O Tar Bandhura (Ankhi and her Friends) is a 2017 Bangladeshi film directed by Morshedul Islam, and produced by Faridur Reza Sagar and Morshedul Islam. The story of Ankhi O Tar Bandhura is based on a book by popular Bangladeshi author Muhammed Zafar Iqbal.

== Plot ==
Titu's life at home and at school is miserable. Although Titu is his nickname, everyone calls him ‘Tita’ meaning sour. He hates just about everything. He thinks his teachers don't understand children; they become mad at them for no reason. He can't go to the library as it remains locked. Teachers insist on memorizing lessons. His elder brother Tito is an expert in doing that. Everyone considers him a good student. Since Titu doesn't like rote learning, so everyone thinks he doesn't like his studies.

Titu's school gets a new head mistress—Dr. Raisa. She begins to change everything. She stops the practice of caning. She opens up the library and talks to everyone with a smile. She never gets angry with anyone. DrRaisa believes that the system of our education is faulty. It's not good that only the teachers will talk and the students listen. This is one reason why students are not attentive. They have lost interest in studies.

Dr Raisa convinces a visually impaired girl, Ankhi, to attend her school rather than one for the visually handicapped. But finding her teachers uncooperative, Ankhi decides to leave school. Her friends however, intervene. They stand behind her. Ankhi tells them that she doesn't want to be considered a ‘blind’ girl. She wants to be just an ordinary girl, like any other. Her friends take the challenge. None of them thinks Ankhi is any different, least of all being a ‘blind’ girl.

But wanting to be normal is one thing, becoming one is quite another. Ankhi can't play with anyone. Titu however finds out that although Ankhi can't see, she can hear things much better than others. Titu takes the help of a shoe smith and makes a cricket ball which makes a sound when it's in play. He presents the ball to Ankhi. Ankhi feels ecstatic. She can now catch the ball when it flies, and can hit it with her bat. She becomes an excellent cricket player and shows everyone that blind people can do things just like the sighted ones if they are given an opportunity. The shoe smith doesn't take any money for the ball, but Dr Raisa brings him to school and honours him.

To celebrate their team's becoming champion in the cricket tournament, Ankhi visits Bandarban with her friends. There they are kidnapped by a gang of robbers who take Ankhi and five of her friends to a secret hideout. Their intention is to sell the girls to traffickers who will take them to Yangon. But Ankhi and her friends show exemplary presence of mind and intelligence to escape, and help the security forces capture the kidnappers.

Seeing the way Ankhi has developed, other differently challenged girls and boys enroll in her school. Even a wheel chair bound student joins the school's football team.

== Cast ==
- Jahin Nawar Huq Isha (Ankhi)
- Anannyo Samayel (Titu)
- Zuyairia Ahmed Protyasha (Ritu)
- Ariana Kabir (Shanta)
- Shakil Ahmed (Sujon)
- Ayman Mahmud Arion (Mamun)
- Abdus Shihab Apan (Ashraf)
- Syed Ashiquzzaman Romio (Bazlu)
- Dhrubanti (Sumi)
- Nabid Hasan Omi (Tito)
- Shubarna Mustafa (Dr. Raisa)
- Tariq Anam Khan (Ankhi's Father)
- Afsana Mahmud (Ankhi's Mother)
- Munira Yusuf Memi (Titu's Mother)
- Al Mansoor (Kader Box)
- Susmita Sinha (Ankhi's Cousin)
- SM Mohsin (Bangla Teacher)
- Kamol Ghose (Head Sir)
- Udayan Bikash Barua (Old Dacoit)
- Komol Siddiqui (Armi Officer)

== Production ==
The film was shot mostly in Dhaka, Bangladesh and in the dense forests and hills of Bandarban, Bangladesh. It is a joint production by Monon Chalachitra and Impress Telefilm Limited.

== Sound track ==
The music director of the movie is Swani Zubayeer. The movie has a single song.
