= Elora Gohor =

Bangladeshi actress

Elora Gahar
- ইলোরা গহর
- Occupation: Film actor
- Years active: 1979–present
- Notable work: Surja Dighal Bari
- Father: Noyeem Gahar
- Awards: National Film Award (1st time)

Elora Gahar is a Bangladeshi film and television actress. She won Bangladesh National Film Award for Best Child Artist for the film Surja Dighal Bari (1979).

== Selected films and drama ==
- Surja Dighal Bari - 1979
- Gangchil - 1980
- Naat Bou - 1982
- Choruivati - 2002
- Bachelor - 2004
- 69 - 2005
- Chicken Tikka Masala - 2010
- Madhumati - 2011
- Chabial Reunion - 2017
- Abbas (2019) as Najma Joaddar
- Laal Moroger Jhuti (2021)

== Awards and nominations ==
National Film Awards

Year	Award	Category	Film	Result
1979	National Film Award	Best Child Artist	Surja Dighal Bari	Won
