= Khandaker Sumon =

Bangladeshi filmmaker and screenwriter

- Khandaker Sumon, Filmmaker
- Born: 2 February 1982 (age 44); Tista, Lalmonirhat District, Bangladesh
- Other name: K. M. Halimuzzaman (official name)
- Education: Bangladesh Film Institute
- Occupations: Film director; Screenwriter; Cinematographer; Writer; Film critic
- Years active: 2016–present
- Notable work: Pounopunik (2016); Ongoj (2017); Saatao (2023)
- Spouse: Easrib Ara Ghani
- Children: 3
- Awards: Bangladesh National Film Awards (2023)

Khandaker Sumon (official name: K. M. Halimuzzaman) is a Bangladeshi independent filmmaker, screenwriter, and writer. He won the Best Film and Best Director awards, among four total categories, at the 48th Bangladesh National Film Awards (2023) for his debut feature film Saatao.

== Early life and education ==
Khandaker Sumon was born on 2 February 1982 in Tista Bazar of Lalmonirhat District, where he also grew up, though his ancestral home is in Gaibandha District. His father, K. M. Farhad Alam, worked at the Bangladesh Agricultural Development Corporation (BADC), and his mother, Late Halima Farhad, was a homemaker. He is the third among six siblings. He is married to Easrib Ara Ghani and has three daughters.

He completed his Secondary School Certificate (SSC) and Higher Secondary Certificate (HSC) in the science group. Later, in 2004, he earned a four-year Bachelor of Science (B.Sc.) degree in Computer Science and Information Technology (CSIT). Alongside filmmaking, he is a businessman and heads the production house Idea Exchange.

== Career ==
Before entering the film industry, Sumon was involved in stage theatre and worked as an active member of Gaibandha Theatre. In 2013, he received training in film appreciation and filmmaking at the Bangladesh Film Institute (BFI) under veteran filmmaker Tanvir Mokammel. He later participated in a cinematography workshop conducted by cinematographer Rashed Zaman, as well as various masterclasses and workshops led by international mentors at film festivals in Bangladesh and abroad.

Sumon began his filmmaking career with short films. In 2016, he directed Pounopunik (The Hamster Wheel Rebellion), based on a short story by Kingshuk Bhattacharya. The film had its world premiere at the 11th Seattle South Asian Film Festival (SSAFF) in the United States, was officially selected at the Kolkata International Film Festival, and won the Jury Mention Award at the 15th Dhaka International Film Festival. In 2017, he wrote and directed the short film Ongoj, based on a story by Tamanna Setu, which had its world premiere at the Nepal International Film Festival (NIFF) in Pokhara, Nepal.

His debut feature film, Saatao, had its world premiere at the 53rd International Film Festival of India (IFFI) in Goa, India, in November 2022, before releasing in Bangladeshi theatres in January 2023. Produced through crowdfunding with contributions from 1,559 people, Sumon served as the film's director, story writer, screenwriter, and dialogue writer. He also worked as the production designer and one of the cinematographers of the film.

In addition to filmmaking, Sumon has served as a jury member at international film festivals, including the Nepal International Film Festival (2025) and the Bogura International Film Festival.

=== Writing ===
Before becoming a filmmaker, Sumon began writing film criticism and theoretical essays on cinema. His articles on film aesthetics and criticism are regularly published in Onno Alo (the literary supplement of Prothom Alo) and other Bangladeshi media outlets.

== Filmography ==
Year	Title	Role	Type
2016	Pounopunik	Director, screenwriter	Short film
2017	Ongoj	Director, screenwriter	Short film
2023	Saatao	Director, story, screenwriter, dialogue, production designer, cinematographer	Feature film

== Awards and honors ==
Year	Award / Festival	Category	Film	Result	Ref.
2017	15th Dhaka International Film Festival	Jury Mention Award	Pounopunik	Won	
2023	21st Dhaka International Film Festival	FIPRESCI Prize (Best Film)	Saatao	Won	
2023	6th Nepal International Film Festival (NIFF)	Gautam Buddha Award (Best International Feature Film)	Saatao	Won	
2026	14th Nepal-Africa International Film Festival (NAIFF)	Best International Feature Film	Saatao	Won	
2026	48th Bangladesh National Film Awards (2023)	Best Film (as producer)	Saatao	Won	
2026	48th Bangladesh National Film Awards (2023)	Best Director	Saatao	Won	
