= Masud Ali Khan =

Bangladeshi actor (1929–2024)

- মাসুদ আলি খান
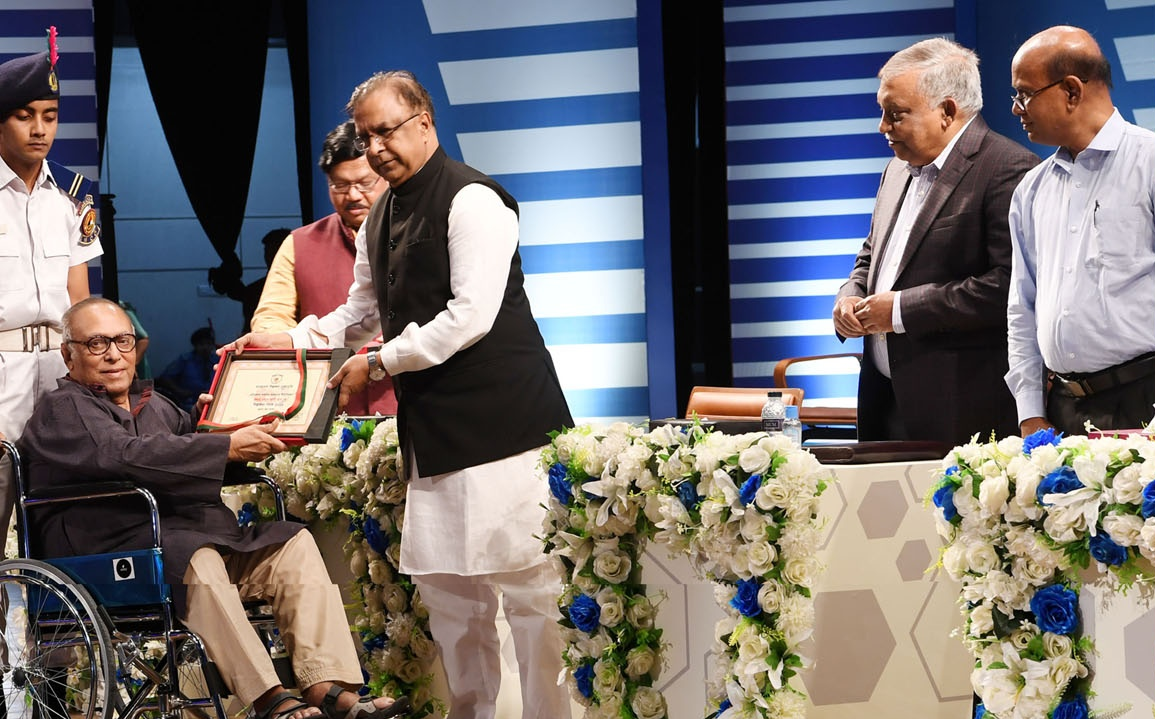
- Masud Ali Khan (on wheelchair) receives Shilpakala Padak 2019.
- Born: 6 October 1929; Manikganj, Bengal Presidency, British India
- Died: 31 October 2024 (aged 95); Dhaka, Bangladesh
- Occupation: Actor
- Years active: 1956–2024

Masud Ali Khan (6 October 1929 – 31 October 2024) was a Bangladeshi television, film and stage actor. He was awarded Ekushey Padak in 2023 by the government of Bangladesh.

== Early life and education ==
Khan was born in Singair, Manikganj, Bengal Presidency, British India on 6 October 1929. He first took to the stage at Manikganj. He completed a part of his education in Kolkata and passed his Matriculation exam from Comilla Victoria College. Later, he studied at Jagannath College and Sir Salimullah College.

== Career ==
Khan debuted his acting career in 1956 by joining the theater troupe Drama Circle. He performed for Drama Circle till the 1990s.

Khan's television debut was through a play Bhai Bhai Shobai by Nurul Momen. It was a verse play and he played the role of the protagonist Dr. Bashir.

Khan made his debut in film acting with "Nadi O Nari" (1965). Later he performed in other films including "Jonakir Alo" (2014), Dipu Number Two (1996), Matir Moina (2002), Dui Duari (2000), and Molla Barir Bou (2005).

== Death ==
Khan died on 31 October 2024, at the age of 95, in the Green Road area in Dhaka. He was buried in his ancestral village of Paril, Singair Upazila, Manikganj District.

== Works ==
Films

- Dipu Number Two (1996)
- Dui Duari (2000)
- Matir Moina (2002)
- Molla Barir Bou (2005)
- Priyotomeshu (2009)

Television drama serials

- Kothao Keu Nei (1990)
- Ei Shob Din Ratri (1985)

Television drama

- Badol Diner Prothom Kodom Ful
- Ekanno Borti (2001)
- 69 (2005)
- Shukhi Manush Project (2007)
- Din Choley Jaye (2008)
- Madhur Jhamela (2008)
- Gulshan Avenue (2008)
- Madhur Jhamela (2008)
- Shada Kalo Mon (2009)
- Shapmochon (2009)
- Fifty-Fifty (2010)
- Poush Phaguner Pala (2010)
- Pavilion (2014)

== Awards ==
- Ekushey Padak 2023
- Lifetime Achievement Award by TV Drama Artiste and Playwright's Association (TENASINAS)
- Meril-Prothom Alo Lifetime Achievement Award 2023
