= Dipu Number Two =

- Commercial Poster of Dipu Number Two
- Directed by: Morshedul Islam
- Written by: Muhammad Zafar Iqbal
- Based on: Dipu Number Two by [[Muhammad Jafar Iqbal]]
- Produced by: Faridur Reza Sagor; Ibn Hasan Sagor (Impress Telefilm Limited)
- Starring: Arun Saha; Subhashish; Golam Mustafa; Masud Ali Khan; Abul Khair; Bulbul Ahmed; Dolly Johur; Bobita
- Edited by: Saidur Rahman Tutul
- Music by: Satya Saha
- Distributed by: Impress Telefilm Limited
- Release date: 1996
- Running time: 154 minutes
- Country: Bangladesh
- Language: Bengali

Dipu Number Two (Bengali: দীপু নাম্বার টু) is a 1996 Bangladeshi coming of age drama film directed by Morshedul Islam. The screenplay was based on the 1984 novel of the same name by Muhammed Zafar Iqbal. It stars Arun Saha, who played the lead role of "Dipu" and Subhashish Roy as Tarique, supporting actors are Abul Khair, Masud Ali Khan, Bulbul Ahmed, Dolly Jahur and Bobita. The film won two national film awards for best child actor (Arun Saha) and best supporting actor (Bulbul Ahmed).

== Plot ==
Dipu (Arun Saha), a boy of about twelve years, lives with his father (Bulbul Ahmed). Dipu's father is a government officer, and because of his transferable job, they arrive in a picturesque town. Dipu immediately develops a liking for this new town and his new school. He makes a lot of friends but starts a feud with the school bully, Tarique (Shubhashish Roy) on the very first day. Tarique, unable to intimidate Dipu, tries many tricks on him and even beats him up one day. Dipu does not complain about it to anybody, and instead contemplates punishing Tarique himself. But one day, a small adventure atop a high water tank changes his feelings towards Tarique.

Suddenly, a new event shatters Dipu's small world. He learns that his mother (Bobita) whom he knew to be dead, actually left tor the United States during his childhood. She has returned for a short trip and wants to meet him. Dipu goes to Dhaka to meet her. He has a very brief encounter with his mother, which changes his entire outlook on the world. He goes to find Tarique at his place and is exposed to another side of Tarique's life. Dipu finds out that Tarique's mother (Dolly Johur) is demented. Dipu also tells Tarique the truth about his own mother. This sharing brings the two boys much closer. It inspires Tarique to share his most guarded secret. He has discovered a cavern that contains many antique sculptures. Dipu discloses their discovery to his classmates, and one night, Dipu and Tarique, along with other boys, set out for a nocturnal adventure to the cavern. To their surprise, they find a group of smugglers who deal in antiques at the operation. With courage and intelligence, they manage to capture the whole gang. They are awarded for their heroics. Like all good events, this episode of Dipu's life comes to an end. His father's term at this place is over. He has to leave, but he has already garnered a lot of fond memories to cherish.

== Cast ==
- Arun Saha - Mohammad Aminur Alam aka Dipu
- Shubhashish Roy - Tarique
- Abul Khair - class teacher
- Masud Ali Khan - Dipu's maternal relative
- Golam Mustafa - Jamshed
- Bulbul Ahmed - Dipu's father
- Dolly Johur - Tarique's mother
- Bobita - Dipu's mother
- Keramat - Drill teacher

Rest of Dipu's friends

- Shafkat - Sajjad
- Farhad- Babu
- Mushfiq - Tipu
- Faisal - Mithu
- Hira - Nantu
- Piyal - Rafik
- Joyoti - Bilu
- Shimon - Dilu
- Sajib - Ahad

Other artists

- Shamsuzzaman Khan Benu
- Abdul Aziz - Criminal
- Udayan Bikash Barua
- Sa Chin Pru
- Anwara Begum

== Soundtrack ==
The soundtrack for Dipu Number Two was composed by music director Satya Saha. The soundtrack consists of background score. There is no song in the movie.

== Awards ==
Year	Type	Award	Film	Director	Result
1996	Best Child Actor (Arun Saha), Best Supporting Actor (Bulbul Ahmed)	National Film Award	Dipu Number Two	Morshedul Islam	Winner

== See also ==
- Amar Bondhu Rashed
