= Khaled Khan =

Bangladeshi actor (1958–2013)

- খালেদ খান
- Born: Juboraj; 9 February 1958; Tangail, East Pakistan, Pakistan
- Died: 20 December 2013 (aged 55); Dhaka, Bangladesh
- Education: Dhaka College; University of Dhaka
- Occupation: Actor
- Spouse: Mita Haque (m. 1985)

Khaled Khan (9 February 1958 – 20 December 2013) was a Bangladeshi actor. He posthumously won the Ekushey Padak in 2022 for his contribution to the field of acting. He was often referred to as Juboraj by the contemporary theater personalities. He won Shilpakala Padak in 2013.

== Education ==
Khan was born in Mosdoi in Mirzapur upazila, Tangail . He completed his SSC in 1973 from Saturia High School and HSC in 1975 from Dhaka College. He then earned his master's degree in management from University of Dhaka in 1983.

== Personal life ==
Khan was married to singer Mita Haque since 1985. He left one daughter Joyeeta who is also a singer. He had served as the treasurer in University of Liberal Arts Bangladesh before his death.

== Career ==
Litterateur Rashid Haider encouraged Khan into acting. He joined the theater troupe Nagorik Natya Sampradaya in 1978. His first theater performance was at the play Dewan Gazir Kissa. He performed in more than 30 plays for the troupe including Nurul Din er Sara Jibon and Darpan. He also directed for Nagarik Natya Sampraday and Subachan Natya Sangsad.

Khan also acted in two films Poka Makorer Ghor Bosoti and Aha!.

== Awards ==
On 22 January 2022, Khan was posthumously awarded the Ekushey Padak, the second most important award for civilians in Bangladesh.

== Death ==
Khan died on 20 December 2013 after suffering from motor neuron disease for 12 years which has left the lower part of his body paralysed.

== Works ==
Television

- Ei Shob Din Ratri (1985)

Films

- Poka Makorer Ghor Bosoti (1996)
- Aha! (2007)
