= 26th Bangladesh National Film Awards =

National Film Awards, Bangladesh

- Awarded for: Best of Bangladeshi cinema in 2001
- Awarded by: President of Bangladesh
- Presented by: Ministry of Information
- Announced on: August 5, 2003
- Presented on: September 10, 2003
- Site: Osmany Memorial Hall, Dhaka, Bangladesh
- Official website: moi.gov.bd

Highlights
- Best Feature Film: Lalsalu
- Best Actor: Raisul Islam Asad; Lalsalu
- Best Actress: Moushumi; Meghla Akash
- Most awards: Lalsalu (8)

The 26th National Film Awards were presented by the Ministry of Information, Bangladesh, to felicitate the best of Bangladeshi cinema released in the year 2001. The Bangladesh National Film Awards is a film award ceremony in Bangladesh established in 1975 by the government of Bangladesh. Every year, a national panel appointed by the government selects the winning entry, and the award ceremony is held in Dhaka. The ceremony took place at Osmany Memorial Hall, Dhaka, and awards were distributed by Prime Minister Khaleda Zia. Additionally, Information Minister Tariqul Islam attended the function as the special guest that evening.

== List of winners ==
A 12-member jury board headed by former secretary A H Mofazzal Karim recommended a total of 21 artists to be awarded for 2001. No award was given in the Best Actor in a Supporting Role category.

=== Merit awards ===
Name of Awards	Winner(s)	Film
Best Film	Tanvir Mokammel	Lalsalu
Best Director	Tanvir Mokammel	Lalsalu
Best Actor	Raisul Islam Asad	Lalsalu
Best Actress	Moushumi	Meghla Akash
Best Actress in a Supporting Role	Mehbooba Mahnoor Chandni	Lalsalu
Best Actor in a Negative Role	Shahidul Alam Sachchu	Meghla Akash
Best Actor in a Comic Role	A.T.M. Shamsuzzaman	Churiwala
Best Child Artist	Shuvon, Shipu, Shantanu, Twinkle, Rini, Rajib	Bicchu Bahini
Best Music Director	Ahmed Imtiaz Bulbul	Premer Taj Mahal
Best Music Composer	Satya Saha	Churiwala
Best Lyrics	Gazi Mazharul Anwar	Churiwala
Best Male Playback Singer	Monir Khan	Premer Taj Mahal
Best Female Playback Singer	Kanak Chapa	Premer Taj Mahal

=== Technical awards ===
Name of Awards	Winner(s)	Film
Best Story	Syed Waliullah^	Lalsalu
Best Dialogue	Tanvir Mokammel	Lalsalu
Best Screenplay	Nargis Akhter	Meghla Akash
Best Cinematography	Abul Khayer	Shoshurbari Zindabad
Best Cinematography	Anwar Hossain	Lalsalu
Best Art Director	Mohiuddin Faruque	Meghla Akash
Best Editing	Mujibur Rahman Dulu; Abul Khair	Meghla Akash; Shashur Bari Jindabad
Best Choreography	Amin Hossain Babu	Meghla Akash
Best Sound Recording	Ratan Pal	Lalsalu

== See also ==
- Meril Prothom Alo Awards
- Ifad Film Club Award
- Babisas Award
