= Shanta Islam =

Bangladeshi film and TV actress

- Born: Najma Haque
- Education: University of Dhaka
- Occupation: Actress
- Years active: 1985-present

Najma Haque (known as Shanta Islam) is a Bangladeshi film and television actress, anchor, and director. She was awarded Bangladesh National Film Award for Best Supporting Actress for her role in the film Onno Jibon. Shanta has directed 25 television dramas and acted in many TV dramas.

== Early life and career ==
Islam was born and brought up in Sylhet. She started her acting career at the theatre and television media in 1985 when she was a student at the University of Dhaka. She was elected Literary Editor of Rokeya Hall twice.

Islam debuted her acting on television with the play Abhijog opposite Syed Ahsan Ali Sydney and on theater with Juddha Ebong Juddha.

After joining Aranyak Natyadal, she won the Best Actor at the BACHSUS Awards for the play, Moyurshinghashon.

Islam hosted several television shows.

== Works ==
=== Drama ===
Year	Drama Series	Co-Artist	Director	Network
	Rupnagar			BTV
	Abhijog			BTV
	Nayok	Afzal Hossain		BTV
2001	Onte Bosonto	Shomi Kaiser, Shahiduzzaman Selim, Abdul Quader, Ferdousi Mazumder		BTV
	OHOMIKA	Falguni Hamid, Kamal Uddin, Farid ali		
	Ghotonar Por	Khaled Khan		

=== Films ===
Year	Film	Co-Artist	Director
1995	Anya Jibon	Raisul Islam Asad, Chitralekha Guho, Champa	
1999	Somudro Bilash Private Limited	Zahid Hasan, Asaduzzaman Noor, Meher Afroz Shaon	
2000	Mone Pore Tomake	Riaz, Riya Sen, A.T.M. Shamsuzzaman, Humayun Faridi, Dildar	
