= Aynun Nahar Putul =

Bangladeshi actress

- আইনুন নাহার পুতুল
- Education: Jahangirnagar University (MPhil)
- Occupation: Actress

Aynun Nahar Putul is a Bangladeshi model, actress and television presenter. She won Bangladesh National Film Award for Best Actress for her role in the film Saatao (2023).

== Background ==
Aynun Nahar Putul was born to Nurunnahar Kabir. Putul has an older brother, Humayun Kabir, working as the Deputy Secretary of the Ministry of Public Administration. Putul graduated with an MPhil degree from the Drama and Dramatics Department of Jahangirnagar University. As of July 2025, she is pursuing her PhD on the topic "Women in Liberation War-based Films: In the Context of Education and Social Reality" at the same university.

== Career ==
Putul made her acting debut by performing on stage for the Moni Mela Khelaghor in Jamalpur. She performed on stage for Jamalpur Theatre. She later got involved with Arshinagar Theatre. Here she has acted once in the play Sei Raate Purnima Chhilo. Then she has made multiple appearances for the role of Radha in the play Rahu Chondaler Har.

Putul has been working as a television presenter at Boishakhi Television of programmes like agriculture related programmes, Shubho Sokal, and Golden Song.

Putul acted in several award-winning films including Ghetuputra Komola, Brihonnola, Mission Extreme, Bildakini and Saatao.

== Personal life ==
They have a daughter Rajkonnya Meghboti (aged 1).
