= Swani Zubayeer =

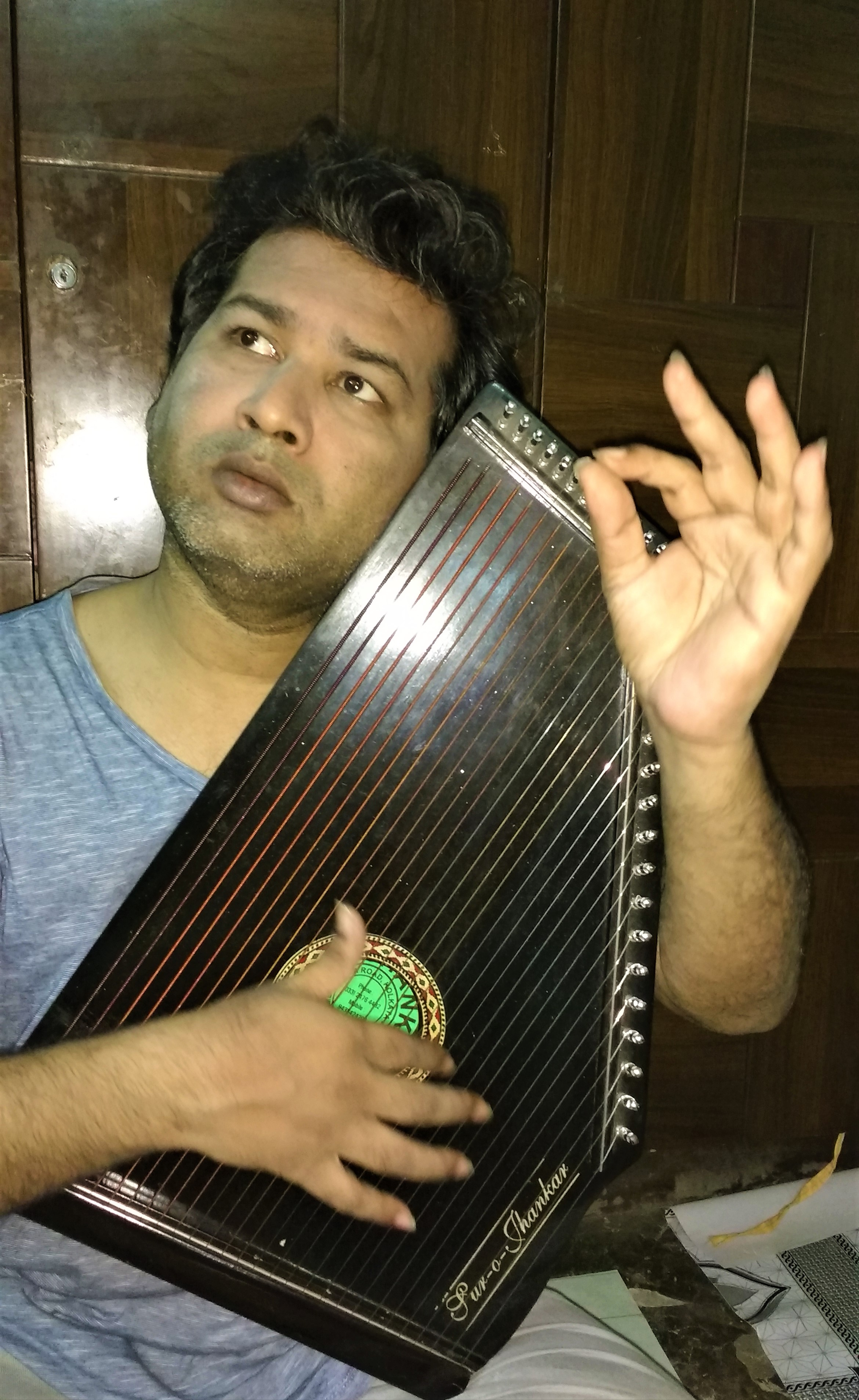
- Born: 2 December 1973 (age 52); Dhaka, Bangladesh
- Occupations: Singer, composer, music director
- Awards: National Film Awards (2015)

Swani Zubayeer (born 2 December 1973) is a Bangladeshi classical singer, composer and music director. He won Bangladesh National Film Awards in best music director category for the film Anil Bagchir Ekdin in 2015.

== Early life and family ==
Zubayeer was born on 2 December 1973 in Dhaka, the capital of Bangladesh to Muhammad Hamidullah and Khurshid Jahan. His grandfather was Khan Mohammad Moinuddin. He completed his Secondary School Certificate from St Gregory's High School and Higher Secondary School Certificate from Dhaka Notre Dame College.

Zubayeer learnt the basics of Indian classical music from his family friend Gobindo Ravi Das. He was enrolled in Patiala gharana in 1993. He was trained in Indian classical music there by Mazhar Ali Khan and Jawaad Ali Khan. He studied 2 years for a Diploma degree in music composition from 1999 to 2001 at Gotland School of Music Composition. His compositions were played in The Ljudvågor Festival when he was a student at that institution.

In 2001, he enrolled at the Department of Composition at the Royal College of Music in Stockholm. He was awarded scholarship from Inge & Einar Rosenborg Foundation for Swedish Music and Gehrmans Musikförlag for further studies in composition in 2002. He earned his post graduate degree in Western Classical Composition in 2006.

== Career ==
Zubayeer taught music composition at Alliance Française de Dhaka for five years. In 2003, Zubayeer composed and arranged an orchestral work titled The Golden Land which was based on the seasons of Bangladesh and her nature. The work was commissioned by Sundsvall Symphony Orchestra.

He started directing music in 2015 for films through Ghashphul: The Flower of Grass, a film directed by Akram Khan. Other Bengali films with his musical direction are Anil Bagchir Ekdin (2015), Ankhi O Tar Bandhura (2017) and Kaler Putul (2018). He is currently running a music institute called Royal Institute of Music Bangladesh.

== Albums ==
Some of Zubayeer's notable albums are:

- Sara (1998)
- Nirjon Sakhkhor (October 2003)
- Ajosro Kobita
- Apna Khayal (January 2003)
- Jugolshondhi
- Odbhut Andhar Ek
- Chander Sarobore
- Keno Megher O Chaya (2012)
