= Syed Waliullah =

Bangladeshi novelist and playwright

- সৈয়দ ওয়ালিউল্লাহ
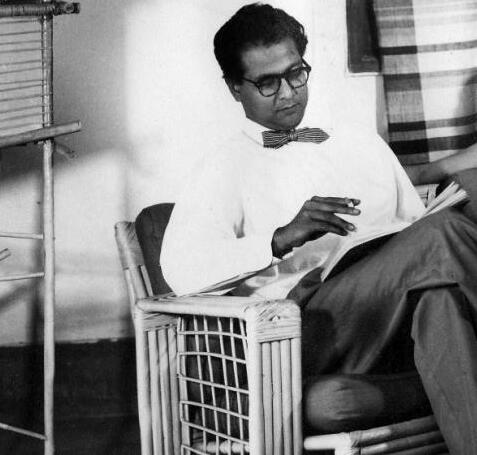
- Waliullah in 1956 in Karachi
- Pronunciation: [soi̯̯ɔd̪ o̯aliulːaʱ]
- Born: August 15, 1922; Chittagong, Bengal Presidency, British India
- Died: October 10, 1971 (aged 49); Meudon, France
- Resting place: Meudon, France
- Education: Dhaka College; Ananda Mohan College (1943); University of Calcutta
- Occupations: Novelist; short story writer; playwright; news editor
- Spouse: Anne Marie Thibaud (m. 1955; died 1971)
- Father: Syed Ahmadullah
- Awards: Ekushey Padak (posthumously)
- Website: www.syedwaliullah.com

Syed Waliullah (Note: Bengali: সৈয়দ ওয়ালীউল্লাহ, Bengali pronunciation: [soi̯̯ɔd̪ o̯aliulːaʱ].) (Bengali: সৈয়দ ওয়ালীউল্লাহ, pronounced [soi̯̯ɔd̪ o̯aliulːaʱ]; 15 August 1922 – 10 October 1971) was a Bangladeshi novelist, short-story writer and playwright. He was notable for his debut novel, Lalsalu (translated in English with the title "Tree Without Roots"). He was awarded Bangla Academy Literary Award (1961), Adamjee Prize (1965), Ekushey Padak (1984) and Bangladesh National Film for Best Story (2001).

== Early life and education ==
Waliullah was born on 15 August 1922 at Sholashahar in Chittagong District to Nasim Ara Khatun and Syed Ahmadullah. His mother died when he was twelve. He has an elder brother, Syed Nasrullah. His father, Syed Ahmadullah, was a government officer. He was a district magistrate of British Raj period. Waliullah spent his childhood in Mymensingh, Feni, Krishnanagar and Kurigram. His notable novel, Lalsalu, was inspired by a shrine covered with red cloth that he would often pass when he lived in Mymensingh.

Waliullah passed his matriculation examination in 1939 from Kurigram High School. He completed his IA from Dhaka College in 1941 and bachelor's from Ananda Mohan College in Mymensingh in 1943. He then moved to Calcutta to complete his master's in economics. But he couldn't complete his master's due to untimely demise of his father. He joined The Statesman newspaper and worked until 1947.

== Career ==
In 1947, Waliullah moved from Calcutta to Dhaka. He joined Radio Pakistan. In 1950, he was transferred to Karachi. In 1951, he started serving as the press attaché at the Pakistan missions in New Delhi, Sydney, Jakarta and London. In 1960, he was appointed as the First Secretary at the Pakistan embassy in Paris. In 1967, he joined the UNESCO in Paris.

== Literature ==
Waliullah is often considered the pioneer of existential analysis of the characters psyche in the literature of Bangladesh. The last two of his three novels, especially Kando Nadi Kando (Cry, o river), (কাঁদো নদী কাঁদো) (1968), show his mastery in revealing the inner depths of his characters. Chander Amaboshay (Dark moon) (চাঁদের অমাবস্যা ), (1964) was another famous novel of him. Nayanchara (নয়নচারা), (1946) and Dui Tir O Anyanya Galpa (দুই তীর এবং অন্যান্য গল্প), (1965) are storybooks written by him.

== Lalsalu ==
Lalsalu tells the story of Majid, a poor man from a devout Muslim background. Majid comes to a remote village. He declares an old grave to be the Mazar that of a Pir, covers it with the traditional red cloth used for mausoleums, and establishes his stronghold on the life of the people using the reflected power on him of the supposed saint. The novel shows his struggle with other religious figures trying to establish dominance, the undercurrent of pagan ideas among the people, and his own weaknesses.

The novel was adapted to a Tanvir Mokammel film with the same title in 2001.

== Personal life and death ==
Waliullah met Anne Marie Thibaud (1929–1997), a French woman, in Sydney. They were married in 1955 and had two children, Simine and Iraj. He was a cousin of Jamal Nazrul Islam, a physicist and mathematician.

Waliullah died in Meudon in Paris on October 10, 1971.

== Works ==
Novels

- Lalsalu (Tree without roots), 1948
- Chander Amaboshay (Dark moon), 1963
- Kando Nadi Kando (Cry, o river), 1966
- The Ugly Asian, 1959

Dramas

- Bahipir (1955)
- Tarangabhanga (1964)
- Sudanga (1964)

Short story collection

- Nayanchara (1945)
- Dui Teer O Anyanya Galpa (1965)
