= Mita Haque =

Bangladeshi singer (1962–2021)

- মিতা হক
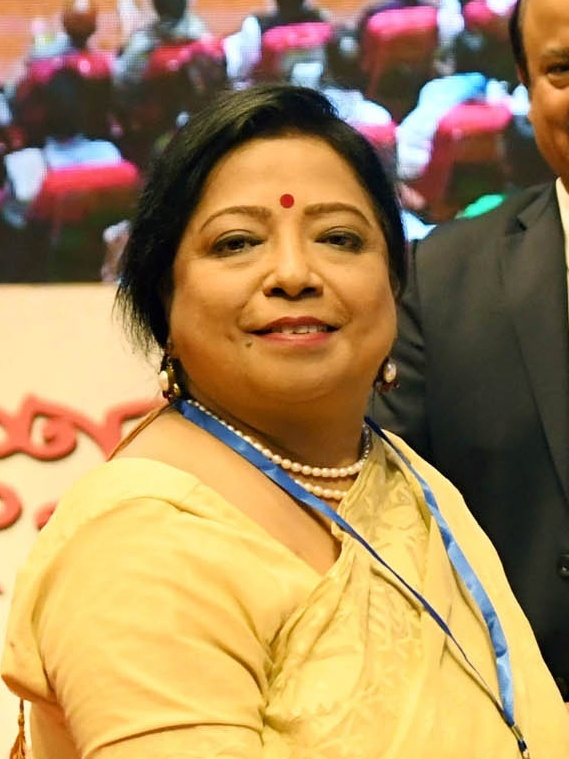
- Haque in 2020.
- Born: 6 September 1962; Dhaka, East Pakistan, Pakistan
- Died: 11 April 2021 (aged 58); Dhaka, Bangladesh
- Occupations: Singer, lecturer
- Spouses: Khaled Khan (m. 1985; died 2013)

Mita Haque (6 September 1962 – 11 April 2021) was a Bangladeshi Rabindra Sangeet singer. She had 14 solo musical albums released from India and 10 musical albums released in Bangladesh. She was awarded Ekushey Padak by the government of Bangladesh in 2020 for her contributions to music.

== Career ==
Haque's mentors were Sanjida Khatun and her paternal uncle Waheedul Haq. At the age of eleven, she participated at the International Children's Festival in Berlin. Later in 1976 she started taking formal music lessons from tabla player Mohammad Hossain Khan.

Haque used to run a music school Surtirtha. She also served as the head of the Rabindra Sangeet Department at Chhayanaut Sangeet Bidyayatan in Dhaka.

Haque also served as a lecturer at Chhayanaut Sangeet Vidyayatan in Dhaka.

== Personal life ==
Haque was married to actor-director Khaled Khan (d. 2013).

== Death ==
Haque died on 11 April 2021 after contracting COVID-19 during the COVID-19 pandemic in Bangladesh.
