= Tonmoy =

Bangladeshi film actor

- তন্ময়
- Born: Master Tonmoy
- Occupation: Film actor
- Years active: 1993–present
- Notable work: Anya Jibon
- Awards: National Film Award (1st time)

Tonmoy (known as Master Tonmoy) is a Bangladeshi film actor. He won Bangladesh National Film Award for Best Child Artist for the film Anya Jibon (1995).

== Selected films ==
- Keyamot Theke Keyamot - 1993
- Anya Jibon - 1995
- Nayan - 1995
- Hangor Nodi Grenade - 1997

== Awards and nominations ==
National Film Awards

Year	Award	Category	Film	Result
1995	National Film Award	Best Child Artist	Anya Jibon	Won
