= Government film grant in Bangladesh =

Yearly government film grant project

- বাংলাদেশে সরকারী চলচ্চিত্র অনুদান

Agency overview
- Formed: 1976
- Jurisdiction: Government of Bangladesh
- Agency executive: Mahfuj Alam
- Parent department: Ministry of Information and Broadcasting
- Website: dfp.gov.bd

The government film grant in Bangladesh is a grant project under the Ministry of Information and Broadcasting of the People's Republic of Bangladesh.

== History ==
Since 1976, government grants have been provided for film production every fiscal year to encourage talent and creativity in the film industry. Although it was sometimes discontinued due to political instability, it resumed regularly from the 2007–08 fiscal year. The first film to receive the grant was Surja Dighal Bari.

Through Bangladesh's film grant program, various film projects, such as documentaries, narrative films, and films based on the Bangladesh Liberation War and literature, are prioritized. Grants are provided for short and full-length films (under 30 minutes). During times of political change and due to surrounding circumstances, grant distribution has been suspended, and there have been allegations that, in some cases, applicants were not properly evaluated, and that political reasons and inconsistencies influenced the grant decisions.
