= Ferari Basanta =

1983 Bangladeshi film

- Directed by: Akhtaruzzaman; Rafiquzzaman
- Screenplay by: Akhtaruzzaman
- Starring: Bulbul Ahmed; Bobita; Shuchorita
- Music by: Sheikh Sadi Khan
- Release date: 1983
- Country: Bangladesh
- Language: Bengali

Ferari Basanta (Bengali: ফেরারী বসন্ত) is a 1983 Bangladeshi film starring Bulbul Ahmed, Bobita and Shuchorita. It bagged Bachsas Awards in six categories that year.

== Cast ==
- Bobita
- Bulbul Ahmed
- Shuchorita

== Soundtrack ==
All songs were composed by Sheikh Sadi Khan and lyrics were written by Mohammad Moniruzzaman.

1. "Disco Disco Premer Khelay" - Runa Laila
2. "Ami Hobo Tar Potro Lekhar" - Sabina Yasmin
3. "Basanta Esechhe Pritam Esechhe Bole" - Sabina Yasmin
4. "Ami Andhar Bhubone Alor Piyashi" - Subir Nandi, Samina Chowdhury, Fahmida Nabi
5. "Hridoyer Ochena Duti Nodi" (part 1) - Abida Sultana
6. "Hridoyer Ochena Duti Nodi" (part 2) - Abida Sultana

== Awards ==
Bachsas Awards

- Best Actor - Bulbul Ahmed
- Best Screenplay - Akhtaruzzaman and Moniruzzaman
- Best Director - Akhtaruzzaman and Moniruzzaman
- Best Lyrics - Akhtaruzzaman
- Best Supporting Actress - Rani Sarkar
- Best Music Direction - Sheikh Sadi Khan
