= Fazle Haque (film editor) =

Bangladeshi film editor

- ফজলে হক
- Occupations: Film editor; director

Fazle Haque is a Bangladeshi film editor and director. He is nominated for the 2023 Bangladesh National Film Award for Lifetime Achievement award in June 2026. His notable works include Beder Meye Josna (1989), Molla Barir Bou (2005), Hridoyer Kotha (2006), and Abar Bonobashe Rupban (1966).
