= Ekhoni Somoy =

1980 film by Abdullah al Mamun

- Poster
- Directed by: Abdullah al Mamun
- Screenplay by: Abdullah al Mamun
- Produced by: Afzalur Rahman
- Starring: Bobita; Ujjal; Abul Khair; Suja Khondokar
- Music by: Sheikh Sadi Khan
- Release date: 4 July 1980
- Country: Bangladesh
- Language: Bengali

Ekhoni Somoy (English: It is the time) (Bengali: এখনি সময়) is a 1980 Bangladeshi film starring Bobita and Ujjal. Abdullah Al Mamun garnered Bangladesh National Film Award for Best Director for the film.

== Music ==
Sheikh Saadi Khan composed score where Sabina Yasmin lent her voice to the songs.

== Awards ==
Bangladesh National Film Awards

- Best Director - Abdullah Al Mamun
