= Revenue Sale Law, 1793 =

Revenue Sale Law, 1793 was a British-era law concerning the collection of revenue from Bengal and as part of the Permanent Settlement agreement. The law changed allowed the auction of the land of zamindars who could not pay taxes.

== Background ==
In 1793, the East India Company signed an agreement with landlords, the zamindars and talukdars, of Bengal. The agreement made the landlords the owners of all land in Bengal and fixed a revenue amount that was to be paid to the colonial administration by the landlords. The landlords were given the right to charge whatever rent they wanted to the tenant, as they had no protection under the agreement. The previous Mughal government made zamindars the collectors of taxes and the managers of the land, but the land was owned hereditarily by peasants.

The talukdars served under the zamindars, but these act made them independent landlords. This provision bankrupted many zamindars, as most of their holdings were managed by the talukdars. The purpose of the revenue generation was to send the surplus to the United Kingdom.

== History ==
In 1793, the Revenue Sale Law was passed, which altered the Permanent Settlement. The change made it impossible for zamindar to claim relief from taxes due to natural disasters such as flooding or drought. It also created a provision that allowed the colonial administration to sell off the property of zamindars who defaulted on the payment of taxes.

Bengal is a riverine lowland territory that experiences seasonal floods and droughts. Bengal had an economy dependent on agriculture, which was heavily dependent on the weather. It was not uncommon for harvest to fail and zamindars to be short on their revenue. By 1799, nearly half of all properties of zamindars had changed ownership. In addition to the property, the title of the landlords was also sold in the auctions.

Zamindars who lost their property in auctions sometimes refused to hand over the property to new owners and resisted changes. There were legal cases in court over the ownership of these properties. Law and order deteriorated in the Bengal province. The law was amended through Regulation 7 of 1799, which now made auctions of the property of zamindars who defaulted on taxes yearly events, not monthly. There was tension and conflict between the new landlords, who bought the title in auction, and the peasants, known as Raiyats, who were supported by the dispossessed zamindars.

== Legacy ==
By the mid-19th century, the population of Bengal had increased, and along with that, revenue had also increased. There was no increase in revenue to be collected from the zamindars per the Permanent Settlement agreement, and as a result the auctioning of properties of zamindars who had defaulted on payment to the colonial administration declined.
