= Harunur Rashid (filmmaker) =

Bangladeshi film director (1936/1937 – 2024)

- হারুনর রশীদ
- Born: Harunur Rashid; 1936/1937
- Died: 1 February 2024 (aged 87); Dhaka, Bangladesh
- Occupations: Film director, writer
- Years active: 1976–2021
- Notable work: Megher Onek Rong; Rupaban; Gunai Bibi
- Awards: full list

Harunur Rashid (1936/1937 – 1 February 2024) was a Bangladeshi film director and writer. In 1976, he won the Bangladesh National Film Award for Best Director for the film Megher Onek Rong. Rashid died on 1 February 2024, at the age of 87.

== Filmography ==
=== Director ===
- Rupaban – 1992
- Gunai Bibi – 1985
- Megher Onek Rong – 1976
- Shuorani Duorani (assistant director) – 1968
- Kanchanmala (chief assistant director) – 1967
- Rupban (assistant director) – 1965

=== Writer ===
- Gunai Bibi – 1985
- Megher Onek Rong – 1976

== Awards and nominations ==
National Film Awards

Year	Award	Category	Film	Result
1976	National Film Award	Best Director	Megher Onek Rong	Won
