= Priyanka Gope =

Bangladeshi singer

Priyanka Gope প্রিয়াংকা গোপ
- Genres: film score & Classical Music
- Instruments: vocal
- Spouse: Subir Mitra

Priyanka Gope is a Bangladeshi singer. She won the Bangladesh National Film Award for Best Female Playback Singer for her performance in the film Anil Bagchir Ekdin (2015). It was her debut as a playback singer.

== Early life and education ==
Gope was trained under Ananda Chakrabarty, Dr. Asit Roy, Pt. Arun Bhaduri, Pt. Urmi Dasgupta, and Waheedul Haq. She completed her B. Muse and M. Muse from the Department of Vocal Music at Rabindra Bharati University, Kolkata as ICCR scholar. She did her Ph.D. degree from University of Dhaka. Her thesis was entitled "The Aesthetics and Diversity of North Indian Classical Music". She is an enlisted as a "special grade" artist of Bangladesh Betar and Bangladesh Television in Rabindra Sangeet, Nazrul Sangeet, modern song, and classical music categories.

== Career ==
Gope teaches as Professor at Music Department of the University of Dhaka. Recently she has become the chairperson of the Music Department. As of she got Channel I music award in 2017, 2018 for best Classical Vocalist and in 2020, 2022 for best Nazrul Sangeet Singer. Also she got Rtv Award in 2017 for best female Singer. She released four solo albums and many more mixed albums including the classical albums Sure Sure Dekha Hobe and Raga Delights from Bengal Foundation, Thumri Vol-1 from G Series.

== Playback ==
In 2015, she won the Bangladesh National Film Award for Best Female Playback Singer for her performance in the film Anil Bagchir Ekdin.

In 2023, she sung "Govire" with Rehana Rasool for the highest grossing Bangladeshi film of all time Priyotoma with a Sajid Sarker composition, starring Shakib Khan and Idhika Paul.

== Personal life ==
Gope is married to Subir Mitra.
