= Mehedi Haque Rony =

Bangladeshi cinematographer

- মেহেদী হক রনি
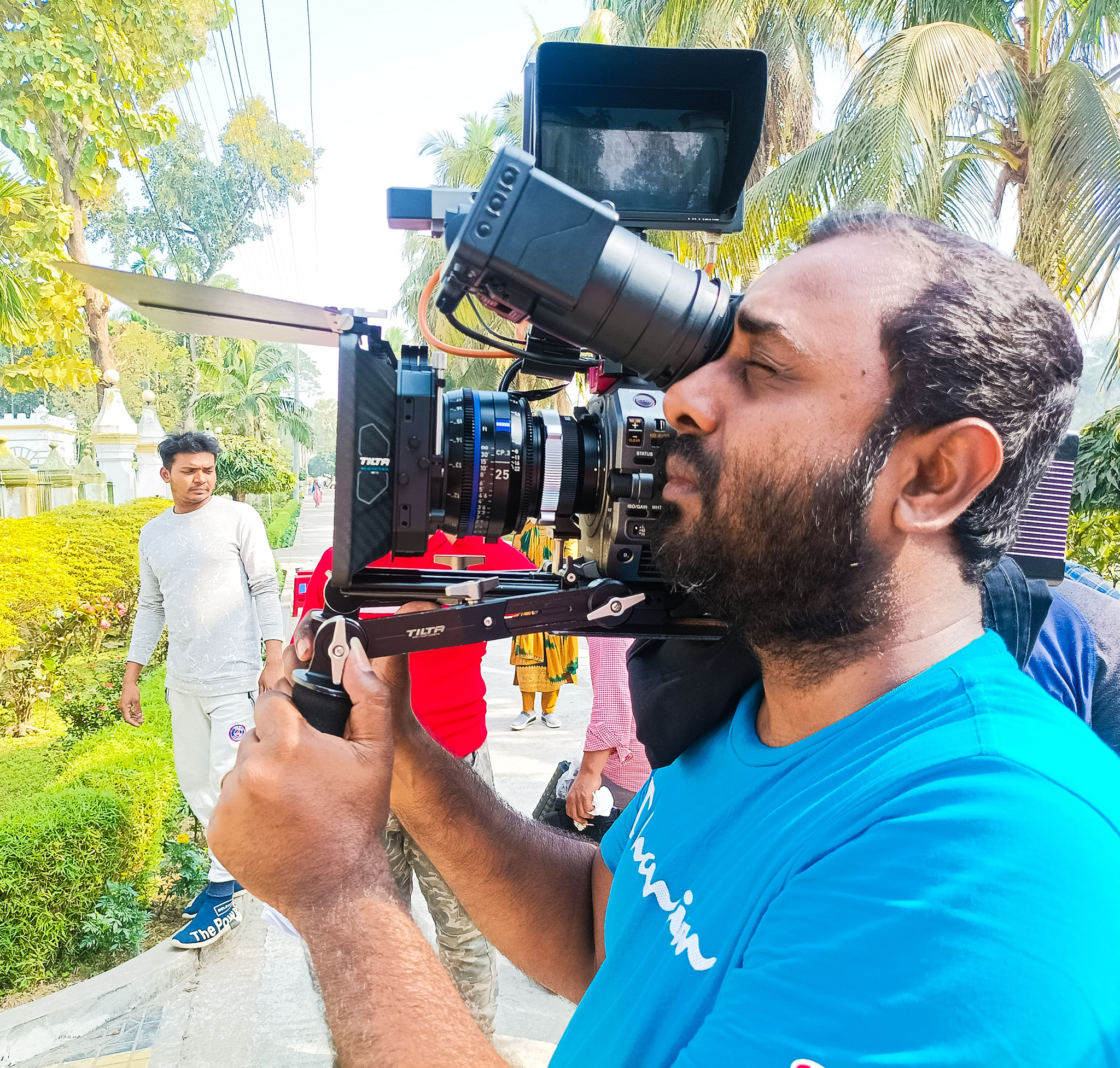
- Rony in Dhaka 2018
- Born: December 31, 1988; Kawkhali Upazila, Pirojpur, Bangladesh
- Occupations: Film Director, Editor, Cinematographer
- Notable work: Bapjaner Bioscope Nabab LLB Abar Boshonto
- Awards: National Film Awards (2015)

Mehedi Haque Rony (born 31 December 1988) is a Bangladeshi Cinematographer. He also worked as Film Director and Editor. As a Best Editor, he won the National Film Awards in 2015.

== Early life ==
Rony was born on 31 December 1988 in Kawkhali Upazila of Pirojpur District. In 2010, he finished the Bachelor of Business Administration (BBA) from a private university. While studying at the university, he offers short and long-term courses on film from several institutes of Bangladesh and India. He is currently the publicity secretary of the Bangladesh Cameraman Association and the full-time member of the Bangladesh Cinematographers Society.

== Career ==
Rony joined the media station as a video editor in 2007. Then he worked as the editor of many organizations till 2010. Since 2010, he started Cinematography as well as editing. Since 2011, he is still working on Cinematography.Twelve fictions have been made under his direction so far. He achieved the Best Cinematography Nomination of the Charunirom Khahinichitro Award 2015 for the Telefilm Adarer Hrin. In the same year he achieved the National Film Award (Bangladesh) for Best Editor from Bapjaner Bioscope.

== Cinematographer ==
Rony has been working as a freelance Cinematographer since 2010. Till now, he has done more than five hundred TV fiction as a Cinematographer. He has also worked as a documentary and several music videos and TV commercials.

== Film ==
- Bapjaner Bioscope
- Darpon Bishorjon
- Omi o Ice Cream Wala
- Raton
- Bandhon
- Abotar
- Psycho
- Abar Bosonto
- Bosonto Bikel
- Kagojer Bou

== Web series ==
- Horizone Polli
- Anandi
- Indubala
- Journey
- Dhoka
- Partner

== Fiction ==
- Adharer Hrin (Broadcast On RTV)
- Jora Shalik (Broadcast On RTV)
- Sentimental (Broadcast On RTV)
- Ek Mutho Valobasha (Broadcast On NTV)
- Porinoti (Broadcast On Banglavision TV)
- Manush / Omanush (Broadcast On NTV)
- Football (Broadcast On NTV)
- Mrs. Cook (Broadcast On Banglavision TV)
- Beginning from the End (broadcast on Channel 9 TV)
- Sonar manush (broadcast on Channel I TV)
- Vangon (broadcast on ATN Bangla TV)
- Mama detective (broadcast on Deepto TV)
- Anti-clock (broadcast on RTV)
- Pacemaker (Broadcast On Banglavision TV)
- Microphone (Broadcast On Banglavision TV)
- Ghuddi (Broadcast On Boishakhi TV)
- Ovinondon (Broadcast On Boishakhi TV)
- Basonto Megh (Broadcast On Maasranga TV)
- Sei Shob Din Gulo (Broadcast on Channel I TV)
- Sei Rokom Cha Khor (Broadcast On Banglavision TV)
- Issue (Broadcast on Channel I TV)
- Blank Point (Broadcast on Channel I TV)
- Test (Broadcast On Maasranga TV)
- Raini Raain (Broadcast On Maasranga TV)
- Aye Khuku Aye (Broadcast on Channel I TV)
- Shopno Jatra (Broadcast On Maasranga TV)
- Bashon (Broadcast in Bangladesh TV)
- Tare Bina (Broadcast on NTV)
- Golap Museum (Broadcast on Channel 9 TV)
- Man V/S Wild (Broadcast on Channel 9 TV)
- Kanamachi (Broadcast On Maasranga TV)
- Tosh (Broadcast on Channel 9 TV)
- Niyat Niyoti Nitantoi (Broadcast On Boishakhi TV)
- Fashoin (Broadcast on Channel I TV)
- Yrss Boss No Boss (Broadcast on N TV)
- Bablu Vaiya (Broadcast On Banglavision TV)

== Non fiction ==
- USAID / PRICE - Mango farming awareness video
- Save the Children - Documentary on the ECB Project Summary
- Practical Action Bangladesh - Documentary on V2R Project Impact
- Care Bangladesh - Documentary Health initiative of RMG workers
- IFIC Bank - Documentary on the impact of agricultural credit services
- Gram Bikas Kendra - Documentary of Dalit community
- RDRS Bangladesh - Documentary of the Dialogue Project for Regional Empowerment
- BRAC - Female sexual harassment documentary
- Islamic Relief Bangladesh - Flood Forecasting and Alert Center Documentary
- Islamic Relief Bangladesh - IRB Aila Report Documentary in Satkhira

== Awards ==
- National Film Awards (Bangladesh), (2015)
- Choruniram Television Kahinichitro Award, 2015
