= Lalsalu =

Book by Syed Waliullah

- Author: Syed Waliullah
- Language: Bengali
- Genre: Novel
- Published: 1948
- Publication place: Bangladesh
- Pages: 110

Lalsalu is a novel by Syed Waliullah published in 1948 by Comrade publishers. It is a classic of modern Bengali literature. Waliullah was conferred Bangla Academy Award for this debut novel in 1961. By 1981 the book's 10th edition was published.

== Plot summary ==
The novel starts with the description of Mohobbotnagar village and the difficulties of village life. A clever man named Majid arrives in the village and realizes that most of the men in the village are simple minded and can easily be fooled through religious superstitions. Majid starts scolding the villagers claiming that they haven't taken care of the grave of the Mudassir Pir (which literally means unknown holyman) and tells them a made up story of a pir (Religious leader) showed him a dream that his grave is not being taken care of and that the people of that area are sinners. Almost every one of the village believed Majid's story including the so-called head of the village, Khalek Bepari. Majid makes a good impression on everyone in the village including Khalek Bepari. The villagers repaired the grave, made a majar (Shrine) and a house for Majid. Majid then starts living there and becomes wealthy by fooling the people of the village with the means of fake religious teachings. Majid also marries Rahima, a widowed lady who is an obedient wife. Majid faces many problems as few people go against him such as Hasuni's grandfather, Khalek Bepari's senior wife, Akkas Mia for establishing a school and the arrival of a great Pir in Awalpur. But very cunningly he solves all these problems. Majid later also marries a teen girl named Jamila (as a second wife), who later on get punished for going against Majid's false teachings which results her being tied up near the holy shrine.

Majid's true character is slowly revealed throughout the story but the villagers are too simple-minded to understand his tricks from the very beginning.

== Reception ==
The novel was translated to English by the author himself with the title "Tree Without Roots" in 1967 by Chatto and Windus Ltd. The French translation was made by the author's wife Anne Marie Thibaud with the title "L'arbre sans racines" by Editions du Seuil. Besides, the book was translated in Urdu, Czech and German languages.

== Adaptation ==
The book was made into the well-received 2001 film with the same title, starring Raisul Islam Asad. The film was directed and produced by Tanvir Mokammel. In 2003, the film earned eight Bangladesh National Film Awards, including the Best Film.
