= Morshedul Islam =

Bangladeshi film director

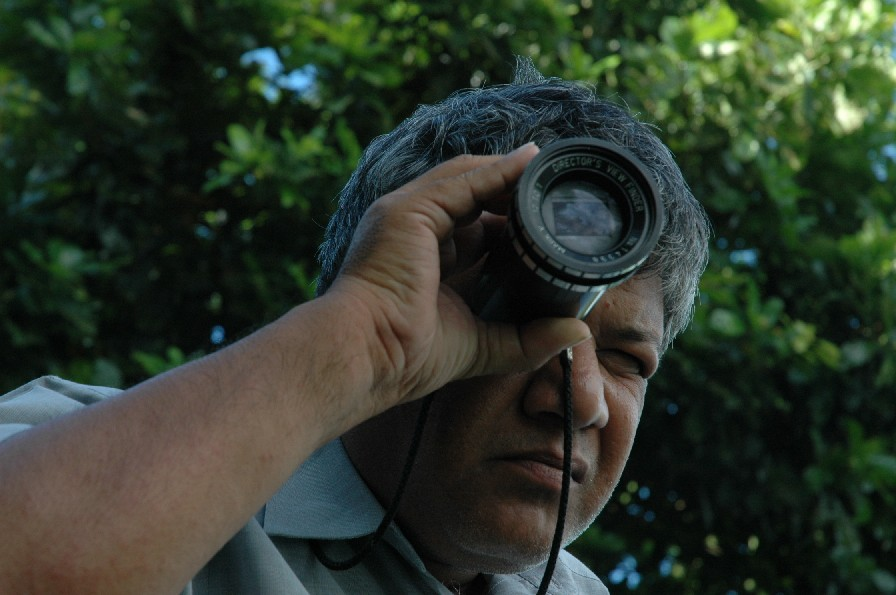
- Born: December 1, 1958 (age 66) at Dhaka, Bangladesh
- Spouse: Munira Morshed Munni
- Children: 2

Morshedul Islam (born 1 December 1958) is a Bangladeshi film director. His notable films include Agami (1984), Chaka (1993), Dipu Number Two (1996), Dukhai (1997), Khelaghor (2006), Durotto (2006) and Amar Bondhu Rashed (2011).

== Biography ==
Islam was born on 1 December 1958 in Dhaka, in then East Pakistan. He made his film-making debut in 1984 with the short film Agami while he was a student. Film critic Ahmed Muztaba Zamal, writing in Cinemaya in 2000, named Islam's Chaka as one of the top twelve films from Bangladesh.

== Filmography ==
- Agami (1984)
- Nouka O Jibon (1986)
- Shuchona (1988)
- Chaka (The Wheel, 1993)
- Dipu Number Two (1996)
- Dukhai (1997)
- Brishty (2000)
- Shorot 71 (2000)
- Durotto (2004)
- Khelaghor (2006)
- Vooter Bari (2007)
- Priyotomeshu (2009)
- Amar Bondhu Rashed (2011)
- Anil Bagchir Ekdin (2015)
- Ankhi O Tar Bandhura (2017)

== Awards and honours ==
- International Critics Award in International Filmfestival Mannheim-Heidelberg in 1983
- Best telefilm, National Film Award 1984
- Bangladesh National Film Award for Best Director, 2015, Anil Bagchir Ekdin (jointly with Reazul Mowla Rezu's Bapjaner Bioscope)
