= Akhtaruzzaman (director) =

Bangladeshi film director

- আক্তারুজ্জামান
- Born: 1946 or 1947
- Died: 23 August 2011 (aged 65); Dhaka, Bangladesh
- Resting place: Govindapur village, Raipura Upazila, Narsingdi District
- Occupation: Film director

Akhtaruzzaman (1946 or 1947 – August 23, 2011) was a Bangladeshi film director. He was awarded the Bangladesh National Film Award for Best Director for his direction of the film Poka Makorer Ghor Bosoti (1996). The film won awards in eight different categories.

== Career ==
Akhtaruzzaman directed three films: Ferari Basanta (1983), Princess Tina Khan (1984) and Poka Makorer Ghor Bosoti (1996). He was a teacher at the Film and Media Department in the Stamford University Bangladesh.

Akhtaruzzaman died on August 23, 2011. Before death he had been working on a film titled Suchona Rekhar Dike, sponsored by the Government of Bangladesh.

== filmography ==
- Ferari Basanta (1983)
- Princess Tina Khan (1984)
- Poka Makorer Ghor Bosoti (1996).
