= Dahan (1985 film) =

Bangladeshi film

- Poster
- Bengali: দহন
- Directed by: Sheikh Niamat Ali
- Screenplay by: Sheikh Niamat Ali
- Starring: Bulbul Ahmed; Bobita; Asaduzzaman Nur; Humayun Faridi
- Cinematography: Anowar Hossain
- Edited by: Saydul Anam Tutul
- Music by: Amanul Haque
- Release date: 1985
- Country: Bangladesh
- Language: Bengali

Dahan (English: Affliction; Bengali: দহন) is a 1985 Bangladeshi film starring Bulbul Ahmed, Bobita, Humayun Faridi and Asaduzzaman Nur. It bagged National Film Awards in 3, and Bachsas Awards in record 10 categories that year.

Faridi played the protagonist in the film.

== Cast ==
- Bobita
- Bulbul Ahmed
- Humayun Faridi
- Dolly Anowar
- Abul Khair
- Fakhrul Hasan Boiragi

== Awards ==
Bangladesh National Film Awards

- Best Director - Sheikh Niamat Ali
- Best Actor in a Supporting Role - Abul Khair
- Best Story - Sheikh Niamat Ali

Bachsas Awards

- Best Actor - Humayun Faridi
- Best Actress - Bobita
- Best Screenplay - Sheikh Niamat Ali
- Best Director - Sheikh Niamat Ali
- Best Writer - Sheikh Niamat Ali
- Best Supporting Actor - Asaduzzaman Nur
- Best Supporting Actress - Sharmili Ahmed
- Best Editing - Saidul Anam Tutul
- Best Music Direction - Anamul Haque
- Best Art Direction - Masuk Helal
