= Sheikh Niamat Ali =

Bangladeshi film director

- Born: 30 April 1940; 24 Parganas, Bengal Presidency, British India
- Died: 24 November 2003 (aged 63); Dhaka, Bangladesh
- Education: Calcutta University
- Occupation: Film director

Sheikh Niamat Ali (30 April 1940 – 24 November 2003) was a Bangladeshi film director. He won the Bangladesh National Film Award for Best Director in 1979, 1985, and 1995 for all the three feature films he ever made - Surja Dighal Bari, Dahan, and Anyajiban respectively.

== Career ==
In 1977, Ali and his co-director Masihuddin Shaker started shooting the film Surja Dighal Bari. The film was based on a novel by Abu Ishaque about the rural people in the 1950s. It won five international awards, including the Mannheim Film Festival and the Portugal Film Society. It was the first film made with a Bangladesh government grant.

== Filmography ==
- Surja Dighal Bari (1979)
- Dahan (1985)
- Anya Jibon (1995)

== Awards ==
- Chalachchitram Award 2004
