= Masihuddin Shaker =

Bangladeshi film director and writer

- মসিউউদ্দিন শাকের
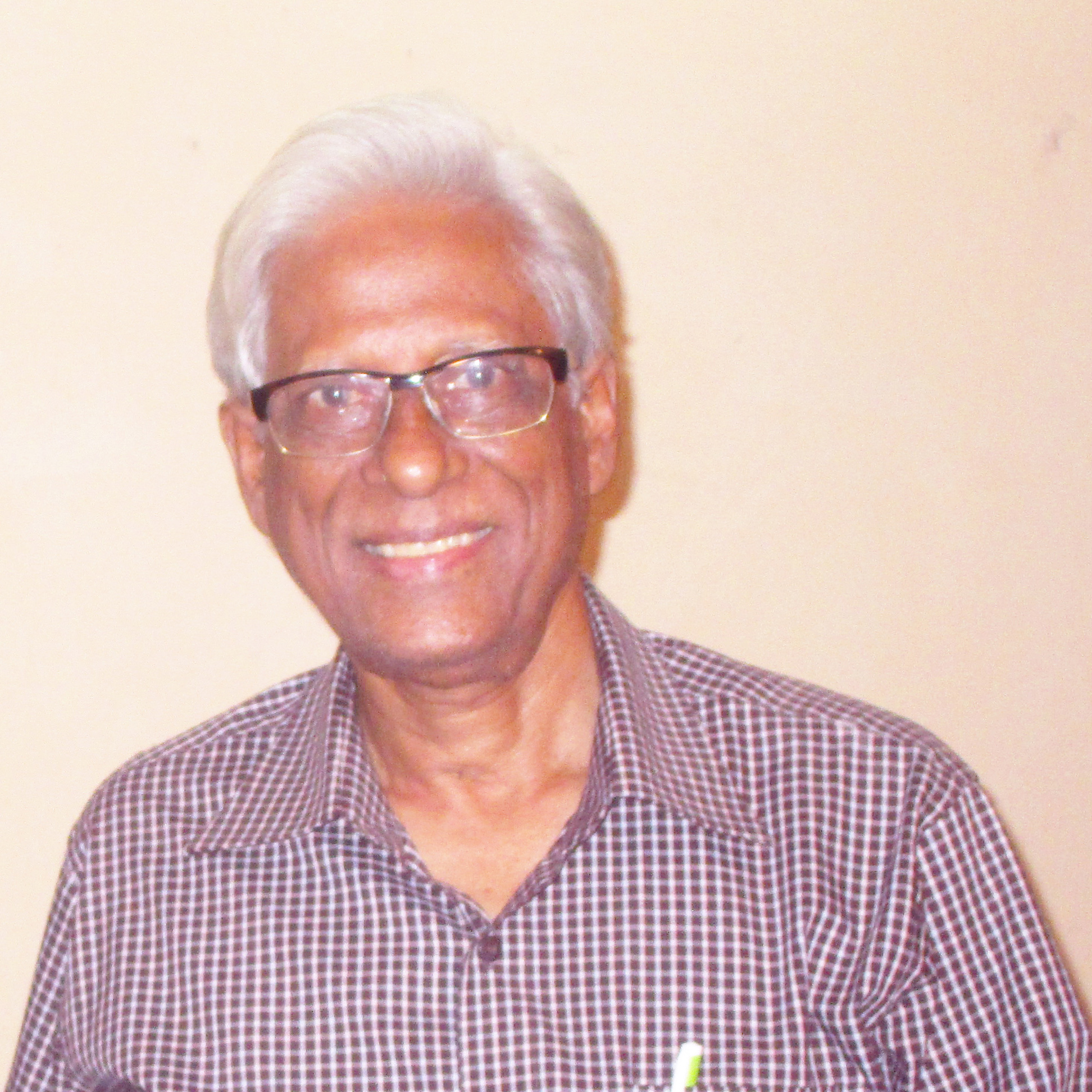
- Born: Masihuddin Shaker
- Occupations: Film director, Writer
- Years active: 1979–unknown
- Notable work: Surja Dighal Bari
- Awards: National Film Awards (1st time)

Masihuddin Shaker is a Bangladeshi film director and writer. In 1979, he won the Bangladesh National Film Award for Best Director for the film Surja Dighal Bari.

== Background ==
Shaker studied architecture at Bangladesh University of Engineering and Technology.

== Selected films ==
- Surja Dighal Bari - 1979

== Awards and nominations ==
National Film Awards

Year	Award	Category	Film	Result
1979	National Film Award	Best Director	Surja Dighal Bari	Won
