= Reazul Mowla Rezu =

Bangladeshi film director

Reazul Rezu
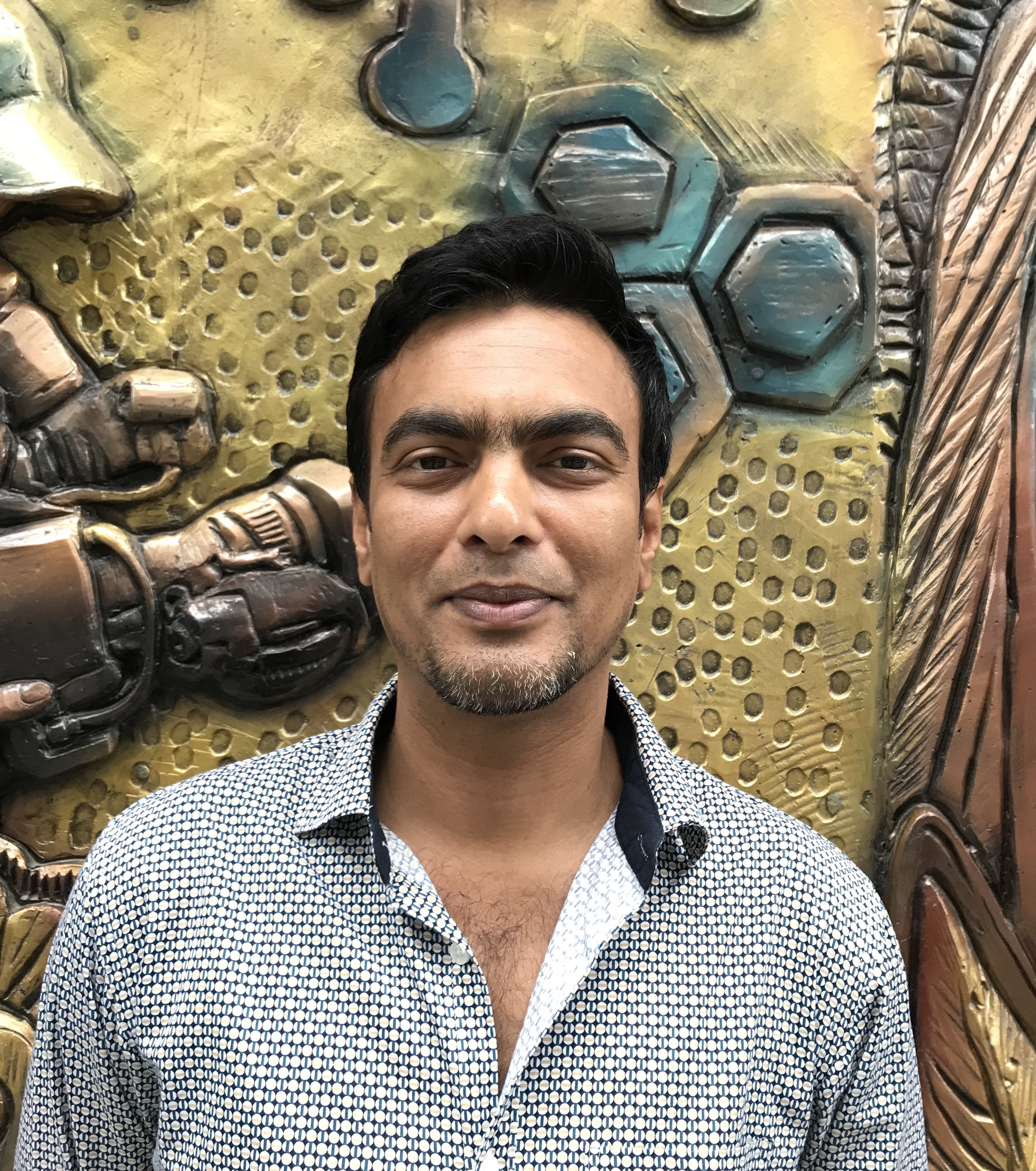
- Occupations: Television and film director
- Notable work: Bapjaner Bioscope
- Children: 2
- Awards: National Film Awards

Reazul Mowla Rezu (born January 17, 1985) is a Bangladeshi film director, producer and screenplay writer. In 2015, he won the Bangladesh National Film Award for Best Director for the film Bapjaner Bioscope. For the film, he won awards in three categories at the 40th National Film Awards.

== Career ==
Rezu directed Bapjaner Bioscope. The film earned eight National Awards. Rezu is the youngest national award winning film director in the Indian subcontinent. In 2021, Rezu signed a contract to appear in the film Madhyavitta. James' popular rock song, "Didimoni," a heartfelt dedication to the female garment workers, has deeply resonated with the audience, winning their affection. Drawing inspiration from this powerful song, Rezaul Rezu is set to direct the film adaptation of "Didimoni".

== Filmography ==
Year	Film	Genre	Casts	Notes
2015	Bapjaner Bioscope	Patriotic	Shahiduzzaman Selim, Shatabdi Wadud, Sanjida Tanmoy	National Film Award winner
2021	Black Light	Thriller		

== Awards and nominations ==
Year	Award	Category	Film	Result
2015	National Film Awards	Best Director	Bapjaner Bioscope	Won
2015	National Film Awards	Best Screenplay	Bapjaner Bioscope	Won
2015	National Film Awards	Best Film	Bapjaner Bioscope	Won
