= Surja Dighal Bari =

Bangladeshi film

- Surja Dighal Bari
- Directed by: Sheikh Niamat Ali, Masihuddin Shaker
- Screenplay by: Shaikh Niyamat Ali, Masihuddin Shaker
- Based on: Surja Dighal Bari by Abu Ishaque
- Produced by: Sheikh Niamat Ali & Masihuddin Shaker
- Starring: Dolly Anwar; ATM Shamsuzzaman; Rawshan Jamil; Sitara Begum; Elora Gohor
- Cinematography: Anwar Hossain
- Edited by: Saidul Anam Tutul
- Release date: 30 December 1979
- Country: Bangladesh
- Language: Bangla

Surja Dighal Bari (The Ominous House) is a 1979 Bangladeshi feature film directed and produced by Sheikh Niamat Ali and Masihuddin Shaker. The screenplay was based on Abu Ishaque's 1955 novel of the same title. It was the first film made from the Government of Bangladesh grant. The film was first released in a theater in Natore.

The film won Bangladesh National Film Award in 7 categories including Best Film, Best Director, Best Screenplay and Best Actress. It also won five international awards, including Mannheim Film Festival and Portugal Film Society.

== Cast ==
- Dolly Anwar as Jaigun
- Rawshan Jamil as Shafi's mother
- Sitara Begum as Lalu's Mother
- ATM Shamsuzzaman as Jobed Fakir
- Elora Gohor as Maymun
- Naresh Bhuiyan as Sadek

== Response ==
Film critic Ahmed Muztaba Zamal, writing in Cinemaya in 2000, named Surja Dighal Bari as one of the top twelve films from Bangladesh. Writing in 2010, scholar of Asian cinema Zakir Hossain Raju called it "one of the best films ever made in Bangladesh".

== Awards ==
Bangladesh National Film Awards

- Best Film
- Best Director
- Best Actress
- Best Screenplay
- Best Cinematography
- Best Editing
- Best Child Artist
- Best Child Artist (special)
