= Anya Jibon =

Bangladeshi film

- Poster
- Bengali: অন্য জীবন
- Directed by: Sheikh Niamat Ali
- Screenplay by: Sheikh Niamot Ali
- Produced by: S Niamot Ali Productions
- Starring: Raisul Islam Asad; Champa; Abul Khair; Shanta Islam
- Cinematography: Anwar Hossain
- Edited by: Atikur Rahman Mollick
- Music by: Amanul Haque
- Distributed by: S Niamot Ali Productions (1995) Theatrical; Laser Vision (2011) DVD
- Release date: 1995
- Country: Bangladesh
- Language: Bengali

Anya Jibon (Bengali: অন্য জীবন) is a Bangladeshi Bengali language film that was released in 1995. The film was screenplay and directed by acclaimed filmmaker Sheikh Niamat Ali who also produced the film under his banner S Niamot Ali productions. The film stars Raisul Islam Asad, Champa, Abul Khair, Shanta Islam, Chitralekha Guho, Tamalika Karmokar and others. In 1991, the film received the National Film Award for the best film award with the other 11 categories.

== Cast ==
- Raisul Islam Asad
- Champa
- Abul Khair
- Shanta Islam
- Chitralekha Guho
- Tamalika Karmakar
- Saifuddin
- Master Tonmoy

== Music ==
The music was directed by Amanul Haque.

== Awards ==
Award Title	Category	Awardee	Result
National Film Awards	Best Film	S Niyamot Ali Productions	Won
National Film Awards	Best Music Director	Sheikh Niyamot Ali	Won
National Film Awards	Best Actor	Raisul Islam Asad	Won
National Film Awards	Best Actress	Champa	Won
National Film Awards	Best Co-Actor	Abul Khayer	Won
National Film Awards	Best Co-Actress	Shanta Islam	Won
National Film Awards	Best Child actor	Master Tonmoy	Won
National Film Awards	Best Photographer	Anowar Hossain	Won
National Film Awards	Best Cinematography	Sheikh Niyamot Ali	Won
National Film Awards	Best editor	Atikur Rahman Mollick	Won
National Film Awards	Best Art director	Uttam Guho	Won
