= Bapjaner Bioscope =

- বাপজানের বায়স্কোপ
- Directed by: Reazul Mawla Rezu
- Written by: Masum Reza
- Produced by: Karukaj Films
- Starring: Shahiduzzaman Selim; Shatabdi Wadud; Sanjida Tanmoy
- Edited by: Mehedi Haque Rony
- Music by: S I Tutul
- Release date: December 18, 2015
- Running time: 127 minutes
- Country: Bangladesh
- Language: Bangla

Bapjaner Bioscope is a 2015 Bangladeshi film directed by Reazul Mawla Rezu, in his feature film directorial debut. It won eight awards, including the awards for Best Film and Best Director at the 40th Bangladesh National Film Awards. The film's story was written by Masum Reza. The screenplay was jointly written by Masum Reza and Riaz Uddin Riju. The film was produced under the banner of Karukaj Films. The film was shot at a char area in the Jamuna River.

== Cast ==
- Shahiduzzaman Selim
- Shatabdi Wadud
- Sanjida Tanmoy

== Music ==
The film's music has been composed by Amit Mallick, with songs written by:

- Masum Reza
- Amirul Islam
- Ayon Chowdhury
- Masud Mohiuddin

Playback singers include:

- S.I. Tutul
- Chandana Majumdar
- Shimul Khan
- Masud Mohiuddin
- Sayem Biplob, among others.

== Awards ==
2015 Bangladesh National Film Awards

- Best Film
- Best Director
- Best Male Playback Singer
- Best Music Composer
- Best Lyricist
- Best Story
- Best Screenplay
- Best Editor
