= Poka Makorer Ghor Bosoti =

Bangladeshi film

- পোকা মাকড়ের ঘর বসতি
- Directed by: Akhtaruzzaman
- Based on: Poka Makorer Ghor Bosoti by Selina Hossain
- Produced by: Bobita
- Starring: Alamgir; Bobita; Khaled Khan; Rawshan Jamil
- Cinematography: Mahfuzur Rahman Khan
- Release date: 1996
- Country: Bangladesh
- Language: Bengali

Poka Makorer Ghor Bosoti is a 1996 Bangladeshi film. It was produced by Bobita and directed by Akhtaruzzaman. The film is based on Selina Hossain's 1986 novel of the same title. The film won four Bangladesh National Film Awards including the Best Film.

== Cast ==
- Alamgir
- Bobita
- Khaled Khan
- Rawshan Jamil

== Awards ==
Bangladesh National Film Awards

- Best Film
- Best Director
- Best Story
- Best Cinematography
