= Saatao =

Saatao; Memories of Gloomy Monsoons
- Official poster
- সাঁতাও
- Directed by: Khandaker Sumon
- Written by: Khandaker Sumon
- Screenplay by: Khandaker Sumon
- Story by: Khandaker Sumon
- Produced by: Sharif Ul Anwar Sazzan
- Starring: Fazlul Haque; Aynun Putul
- Cinematography: Sojol Hossain Ihteshan Ahmed Tinku Khandaker Sumon
- Edited by: Sujan Mahmud
- Production company: Crowdfunded Production
- Distributed by: Idea Exchange
- Release date: 27 January 2023
- Country: Bangladesh
- Language: Bengali

Saatao (Memories of Gloomy Monsoons) is a 2023 Bangladeshi drama film. It was directed and written by Khandaker Sumon. The movie was released on 27 January 2023. The film revolves around the lives of marginalized people. The film was introduced to the festivals with the title Memories of Gloomy Monsoons. Saatao means Raining for Seven Days.

== Cast ==
- Fazlul Haque as Fazlul
- Aynun Putul as Fazlul's wife or Putul
- Shakkho Shahid
- Abdullah Al Sentu
- Md Slauddin
- Sabera Yeasmin
- Zulfikar Chanchal
- Shrabani Das Rimi
- Rasmita Shimu
- Mitu Sarker
- Farruk Shriar Chinu
- Afrina Bulbul
- Rubol Lodi
- Kamruzzaman Rabbi
- Abdul Aziz Mandol
- Bidhan Roy
- Binoy Prosad Gupta
- Supin Barmna

== Production ==
Crowdfunded Production produced the movie. The sound design of the movie was done by Sujan Mahmud, Nahid Masut and Sharmin Doja. The movie was distributed by Idea Exchange.

== Release ==
The movie had a 5 cinema theaters release.

== Reception ==
=== Critical response ===
On the review of NatunNews Monitor, they called Saatao "This type of movies will make Bangladesh proud"

== Awards ==
Dhaka International film festival

- Best film

Nepal International Film Festival

- Best film

Bangladesh National Film Awards

- Best Film
- Aynun Putul (Best Actress)
- Khandaker Sumon (Best Director)
- Sujon Mahmud (Best Sound Editor)
