= Lalsalu (film) =

2001 film by Tanvir Mokammel

- Lalsalu movie poster
- লালসালু
- Directed by: Tanvir Mokammel
- Written by: Tanvir Mokammel
- Based on: Lalsalu by Syed Waliullah
- Produced by: Tanvir Mokammel
- Starring: Raisul Islam Asad; Tauquir Ahmed; Mehbooba Mahnoor Chandni; Chitralekha Guho; Rawshan Jamil; Aly Zaker
- Cinematography: Anwar Hossain
- Production companies: Kino-Eye Films; Maasranga Production Limited (co-production)
- Release date: 2001
- Country: Bangladesh
- Language: Bengali

Lalsalu (titled A Tree Without Roots internationally) is a 2001 Bangladeshi film written, directed and produced by Tanvir Mokammel. The screenplay is based on Syed Waliullah's 1948 novel of the same name.

The film earned eight Bangladesh National Film Awards, including Best Film and Best Director for Tanvir Mokammel.

== Cast ==
- Tauquir Ahmed as Akkas Miah
- Raisul Islam Asad as Majid
- Mehbooba Mahnoor Chandni as Jamila
- Munira Yusuf Memy as Rahima
- Amirul Haque Chowdhury as Khalek Bepari
- Aly Zaker
- Chitralekha Guho
- Rawshan Jamil

== Awards ==
=== Bangladesh National Film Awards ===
- Best Film
- Best Director
- Best Actor
- Best Story
- Best Dialogue
- Best Cinematography
- Best Sound Recording

=== BACHSAS Awards ===
- Critics' Award for Best Actor
