= 1995 in Bangladesh =

- Centuries: 20th; 21st
- Decades: 1970s; 1980s; 1990s; 2000s; 2010s
- See also: Other events of 1995; List of years in Bangladesh

1995 (MCMXCV) was a common year starting on Sunday of the Gregorian calendar, the 1995th year of the Common Era (CE) and Anno Domini (AD) designations, the 995th year of the 2nd millennium, the 95th year of the 20th century, and the 6th year of the 1990s decade.

The year 1995 was the 24th year after the independence of Bangladesh. It was the fifth year of the first term of the government of Khaleda Zia.

== Incumbents ==
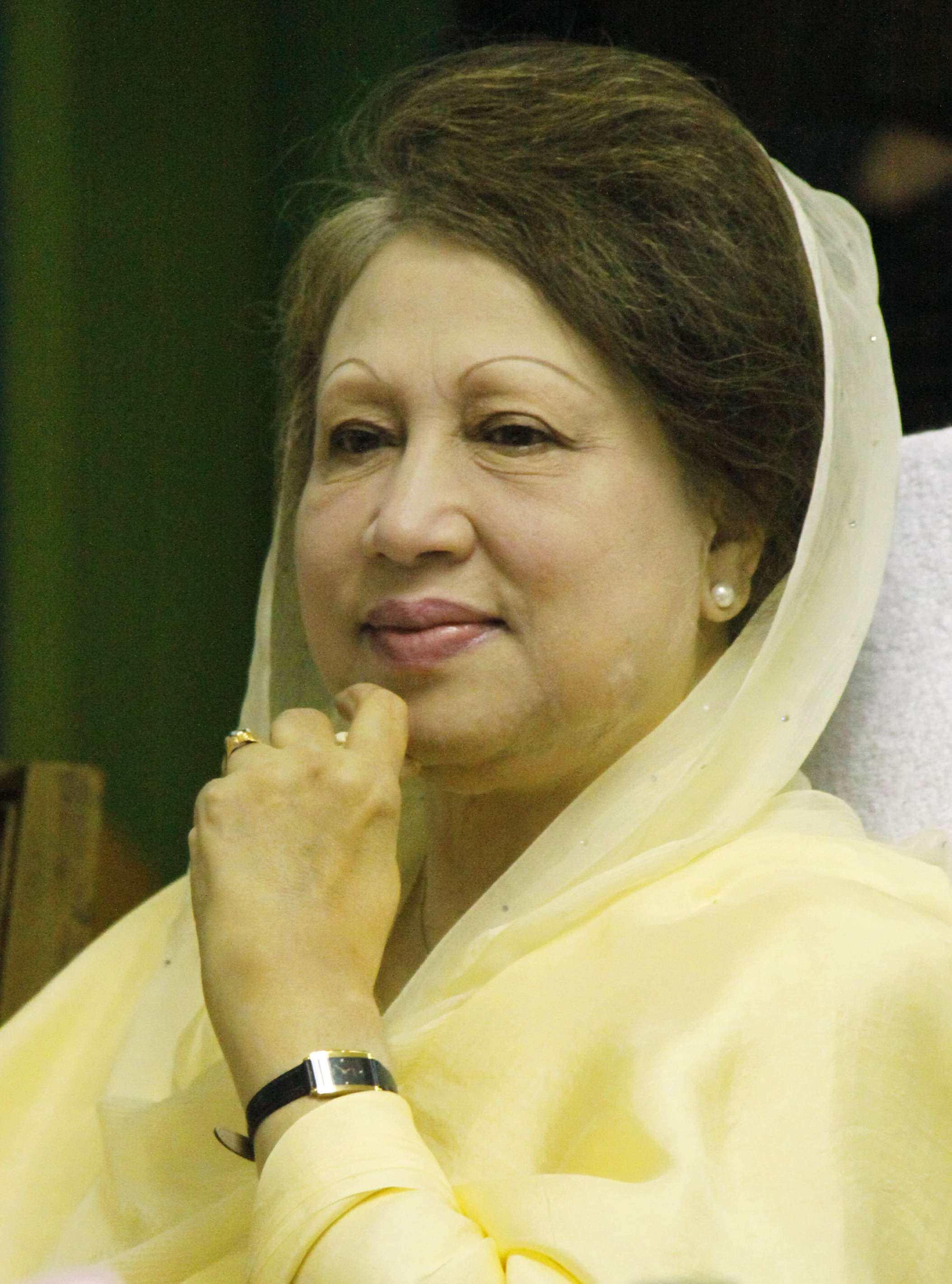
Khaleda
Zia

- President: Abdur Rahman Biswas
- Prime Minister: Khaleda Zia
- Chief Justice:
  - until 31 January: Shahabuddin Ahmed
  - 1 February – 1 May: M.H. Rahman
  - starting 1 May: A.T.M Afzal

== Demography ==
Demographic Indicators for Bangladesh in 1995
Population, total	115,169,933
Population density (per km^{2})	884.8
Population growth (annual %)	2.1%
Male to Female Ratio (every 100 Female)	106.1
Urban population (% of total)	21.7%
Birth rate, crude (per 1,000 people)	30.9
Death rate, crude (per 1,000 people)	8.3
Mortality rate, under 5 (per 1,000 live births)	114
Life expectancy at birth, total (years)	62.0
Fertility rate, total (births per woman)	3.7

== Climate ==
Climate data for Bangladesh in 1995
Month	Jan	Feb	Mar	Apr	May	Jun	Jul	Aug	Sep	Oct	Nov	Dec	Year
Daily mean °C (°F)	18.0 (64.4)	21.3 (70.3)	25.2 (77.4)	28.6 (83.5)	29.2 (84.6)	28.9 (84.0)	28.1 (82.6)	28.2 (82.8)	27.9 (82.2)	27.2 (81.0)	23.5 (74.3)	18.9 (66.0)	25.4 (77.7)
Average precipitation mm (inches)	9.3 (0.37)	26.6 (1.05)	21.1 (0.83)	42.2 (1.66)	187.3 (7.37)	395.2 (15.56)	567.3 (22.33)	486.1 (19.14)	398.6 (15.69)	85.1 (3.35)	135.4 (5.33)	1.1 (0.04)	2,355.3 (92.72)
Source: Climatic Research Unit (CRU) of University of East Anglia (UEA)

== Economy ==
Key Economic Indicators for Bangladesh in 1995
National Income
	Current US$	Current BDT	% of GDP
GDP	$37.9 billion	BDT1,525.2 billion	
GDP growth (annual %)	5.1%		
GDP per capita	$329.4	BDT13,243	
Agriculture, value added	$10.4 billion	BDT416.4 billion	27.3%
Industry, value added	$8.9 billion	BDT359.6 billion	23.6%
Services, etc., value added	$17.1 billion	BDT688.3 billion	45.1%
Balance of Payment
	Current US$	Current BDT	% of GDP
Current account balance	-$823.9 million		-2.2%
Imports of goods and services	$7,588.6 million	BDT264.5 billion	17.3%
Exports of goods and services	$4,431.5 million	BDT165.7 billion	10.9%
Foreign direct investment, net inflows	$1.9 million		0.0%
Personal remittances, received	$1,201.7 million		3.2%
Total reserves (includes gold) at year end	$2,376.2 million		
Total reserves in months of imports	3.7		

Note: For the year 1995 average official exchange rate for BDT was 40.28 per US$.

== Events ==
- 2 February – Moslemuddin Khan, Awami League politician and Khulna City Corporation ward commissioner shot and killed
- 26 February – Abul Kalam Azad, general secretary of Khulna City unit of Bangladesh Jatiotabadi Chatra Dal was gunned down
- 16 February – The Government of Bangladesh enacted the Bangladesh Environment Conservation Act
- 25 April – Sheikh Abul Kashem, President of Khulna Chamber of Commerce and Industry, and his driver were shot dead
- 24 August – Rape and murder of 14-year-old Yasmin Akhter by members of Bangladesh Police resulted in mass protests in Dinajpur.
- 16 September – Nationwide strikes take place across Bangladesh in protest against the government of Khaleda Zia

=== Awards and recognitions ===
==== Independence Day Award ====
Recipients	Area	Note
Abdullah-Al-Muti	science and technology	
Alhaz Moulavi Kazi Ambar Ali	education	
Abdul Karim Sahitya Bisharad	literature	posthumous
Begum Ferdausi Rahman	music	
Begum Syed Iqbal Mand Banu	social service	
Zakaria Pintoo	sports	
Syed Mohammad Ali	journalism	

==== Ekushey Padak ====
1. Ahmed Rafiq (literature)
2. Rawshan Jamil (dance)
3. Mustafa Zaman Abbasi (music)
4. Rathindranath Roy (music)
5. Abdul Karim (education)
6. Iajuddin Ahmed (education)
7. Nizamuddin Ahmad (journalism)
8. Shykh Seraj (journalism)

=== Sports ===
- South Asian (Federation) Games:
  - Bangladesh participated in the 1995 South Asian Federation Games in Madras, India from 18 to 27 December. With 7 golds, 17 silvers and 34 bronzes Bangladesh ended the tournament at the fourth position in overall points table.
- International football:
  - Bangladesh participated in 1995 SAARC Gold Cup, where they lost to India in the Semi-finals.
- Domestic football:
  - Abahani Ltd. won 1995 Dhaka Premier Division League title while Mohammedan SC became runner-up.
  - Mohammedan SC & Abahani Ltd. jointly won the title of Bangladesh Federation Cup.
- Cricket:
  - Bangladesh participated in the 1995 Asia Cup held in Sharjah, UAE and lost all 3 of their matches.

== Births ==
- 11 March – Masbah Ahmmed, sprinter
- 3 April – Taskin Ahmed, cricketer
- 6 September – Mustafizur Rahman, cricketer
- 10 December – Mosaddek Hossain, cricketer

== Deaths ==
- 10 February – Leila Arjumand Banu, singer (b. 1929)
- 19 October – Jahurul Islam, entrepreneur (b. 1928)
- 29 December – Monajatuddin, journalist (b. 1945)

== See also ==
- 1990s in Bangladesh
- List of Bangladeshi films of 1995
- Timeline of Bangladeshi history
