= 1998 in Bangladesh =

- Centuries: 20th; 21st
- Decades: 1970s; 1980s; 1990s; 2000s; 2010s
- See also: Other events of 1998; List of years in Bangladesh

1998 (MCMXCVIII) was a common year starting on Thursday of the Gregorian calendar, the 1998th year of the Common Era (CE) and Anno Domini (AD) designations, the 998th year of the 2nd millennium, the 98th year of the 20th century, and the 9th year of the 1990s decade.

The year 1998 was the 27th year after the independence of Bangladesh. It was also the third year of the first term of the government of Sheikh Hasina.

== Incumbents ==
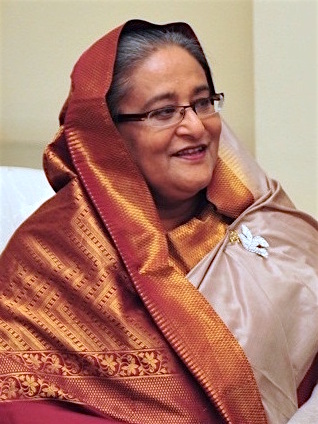
Sheikh
Hasina

- President: Shahabuddin Ahmed
- Prime Minister: Sheikh Hasina
- Chief Justice: A. T. M. Afzal

== Demography ==
Demographic Indicators for Bangladesh in 1998
Population, total	122,682,818
Population density (per km^{2})	942.5
Population growth (annual %)	2.1%
Male to Female Ratio (every 100 Female)	105.9
Urban population (% of total)	22.8%
Birth rate, crude (per 1,000 people)	28.8
Death rate, crude (per 1,000 people)	7.3
Mortality rate, under 5 (per 1,000 live births)	97
Life expectancy at birth, total (years)	64.3
Fertility rate, total (births per woman)	3.4

== Climate ==
Climate data for Bangladesh in 1998
Month	Jan	Feb	Mar	Apr	May	Jun	Jul	Aug	Sep	Oct	Nov	Dec	Year
Daily mean °C (°F)	18.1 (64.6)	21.5 (70.7)	24.1 (75.4)	27.4 (81.3)	28.9 (84.0)	29.0 (84.2)	28.2 (82.8)	28.3 (82.9)	28.7 (83.7)	28.5 (83.3)	23.8 (74.8)	19.7 (67.5)	25.5 (77.9)
Average precipitation mm (inches)	15.9 (0.63)	29.2 (1.15)	98.4 (3.87)	183.4 (7.22)	221.6 (8.72)	546.3 (21.51)	673.7 (26.52)	450.9 (17.75)	270.3 (10.64)	206.3 (8.12)	89.5 (3.52)	0.0 (0.0)	2,785.5 (109.65)
Source: Climatic Research Unit (CRU) of University of East Anglia (UEA)

=== Flood ===
From July to September 1998, Bangladesh suffered extensive flooding. Over 75% of the total area of the country was flooded, including half of Dhaka. It was similar to the catastrophic flood of 1988 in terms of the extent of the flooding. A combination of heavy rainfall within and outside the country and synchronisation of peak flows of the major rivers contributed to the flood. 30 million people were made homeless, and the death toll reached over a thousand. The flooding caused contamination of crops and animals, and unclean water resulted in cholera and typhoid outbreaks. Few hospitals were functional because of damage from the flooding, and those that were open had too many patients, resulting in everyday injuries becoming fatal due to lack of treatment. 700,000 hectares of crops were destroyed.

== Economy ==
Key Economic Indicators for Bangladesh in 1998
National Income
	Current US$	Current BDT	% of GDP
GDP	$50.0 billion	BDT2,269.3 billion	
GDP growth (annual %)	5.2%		
GDP per capita	$407.4	BDT18,497	
Agriculture, value added	$11.3 billion	BDT512.6 billion	22.6%
Industry, value added	$11.3 billion	BDT514.2 billion	22.7%
Services, etc., value added	$24.9 billion	BDT1,130.9 billion	49.8%
Balance of Payment
	Current US$	Current BDT	% of GDP
Current account balance	-$35.2 million		-.1%
Imports of goods and services	$7,952.8 million	BDT365.9 billion	16.1%
Exports of goods and services	$5,865.4 million	BDT266.8 billion	11.8%
Foreign direct investment, net inflows	$190.1 million		0.4%
Personal remittances, received	$1,605.8 million		3.2%
Total reserves (includes gold) at year end	$1,935.8 million		
Total reserves in months of imports	2.8		

Note: For 1998, the average official exchange rate for BDT was 46.91 per US$.

== Events ==
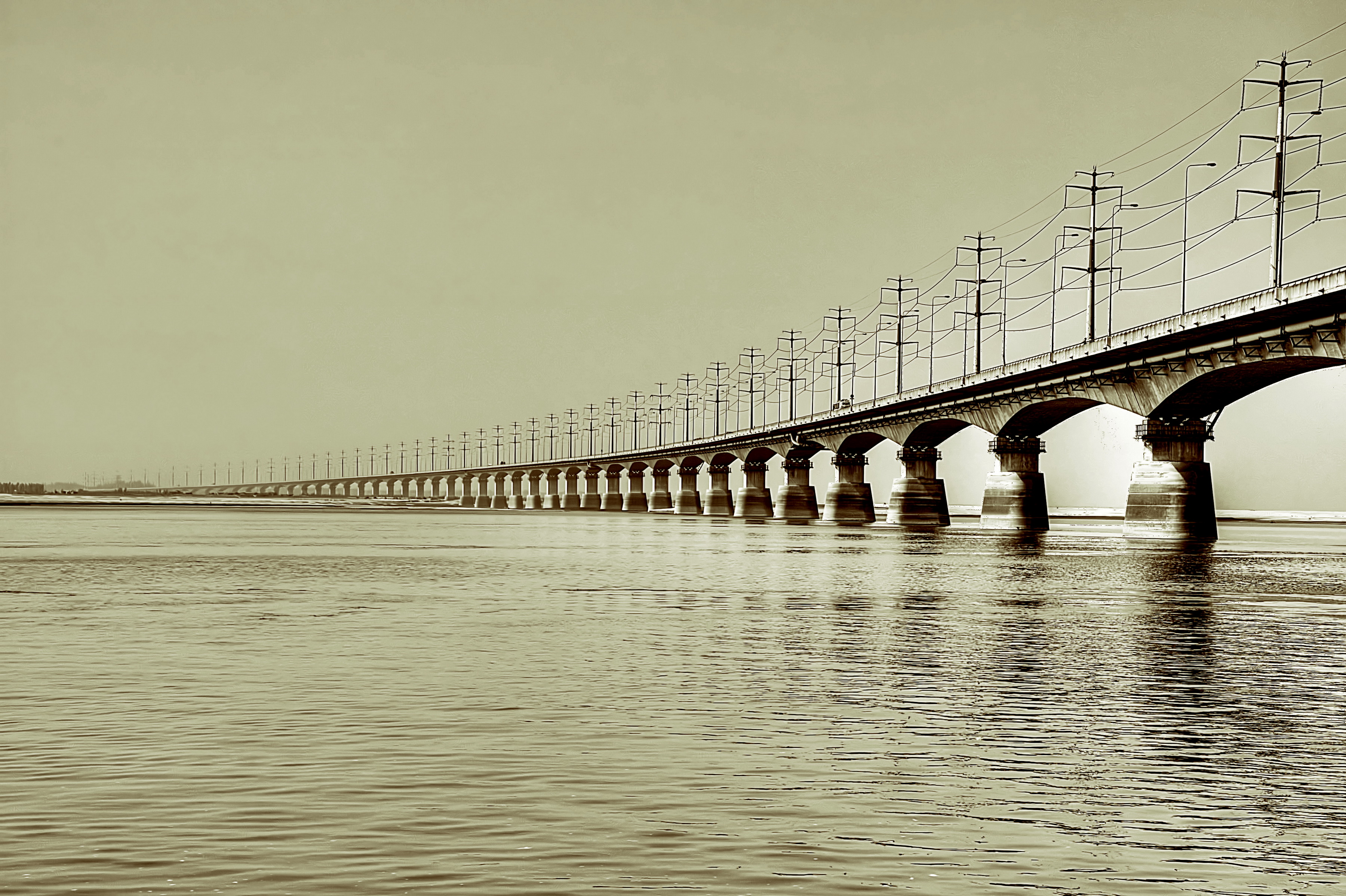
The Bangabandhu Bridge was inaugurated in June 1998

- 18 August – Anwar Hossain Kamal, Khulna leader of Bangladesh Chhatra League, is gunned down in Khalishpur.
- 23 June – Bangabandhu Bridge, the longest multipurpose bridge in Bangladesh, is inaugurated by the prime minister.
- 18 October – Wahiduzzaman Chanchal, vice-president of Bangladesh Jatiotabadi Chatra Dal, is gunned down in Khulna.
- 8 November – US energy company Unocal sign an agreement with Petrobangla to develop the country's largest gas field.
- 3 November – Khulna City leader of Bangladesh Jatiotabadi Jubo Dal, Babul, was shot dead.
- 28 November – Floods devastate rice fields, pushing Bangladesh's annual food shortfall to 4.3 million tons. Over 1000 people reportedly died in the floods.

=== Awards and recognitions ===
==== Independence Day Award ====
Recipients	Area	Note
Shahidullah Kaiser	literature	posthumous
Abdul Mosabber Chowdhury	science and technology	
Sheikh Fazilatunnesa Mujib	liberation war	posthumous
Syed Nazrul Islam	liberation war	posthumous
Tajuddin Ahmed	liberation war	posthumous
Captain Mansur Ali	liberation war	posthumous
A. H. M. Kamruzzaman	liberation war	posthumous
Abdur Rab Serniabat	liberation war	posthumous
Sheikh Fazlul Huq Moni	liberation War	posthumous
Sheikh Kamal	sports	posthumous

==== Ekushey Padak ====
1. Ranesh Das Gupta (literature)
2. Akhtaruzzaman Ilias (literature)
3. Rokanuzzaman Khan (journalism)
4. Abul Kashem Sandwip (journalism)
5. Ferdousi Mazumder (drama)
6. Mahbuba Rahman (music)

=== Sports ===
- Asian Games:
  - Bangladesh participates in the 1998 Asian Games, held from 6 to 20 December 1998 in Bangkok, Thailand. The men's Kabaddi team won a bronze medal in the respective event in the tournament.
- Cricket:
  - Bangladesh hosts the 1998 ICC KnockOut Tournament (officially known as Wills International Cup). It is the first tournament apart from the World Cups to involve all test-playing nations. South Africa defeated the West Indies in the final to win the event.
  - In November, the West Indies A team visits Bangladesh and plays three List A matches against Bangladesh. Starting on 12 November, the two teams play the first-ever first-class match in Bangladesh (i.e., since independence). West Indies A win by 8 wickets.

== Births ==
- 16 January – Masuk Mia Jony, footballer
- 1 February – Zakir Hasan, cricketer
- 22 February – Jaker Ali, cricketer
- 22 May – Munim Shahriar, cricketer
- 25 May – Nazmul Hossain Shanto, cricketer
- 10 September – Hossain Ali, cricketer
- 11 September – Robiul Islam, cricketer
- 7 October – Yasir Arafat Mishu, cricketer
- 15 October – Mosabbek Hossain, cricketer
- 30 October – Saif Hassan, cricketer
- 12 December – Towhid Hridoy, cricketer

== Deaths ==
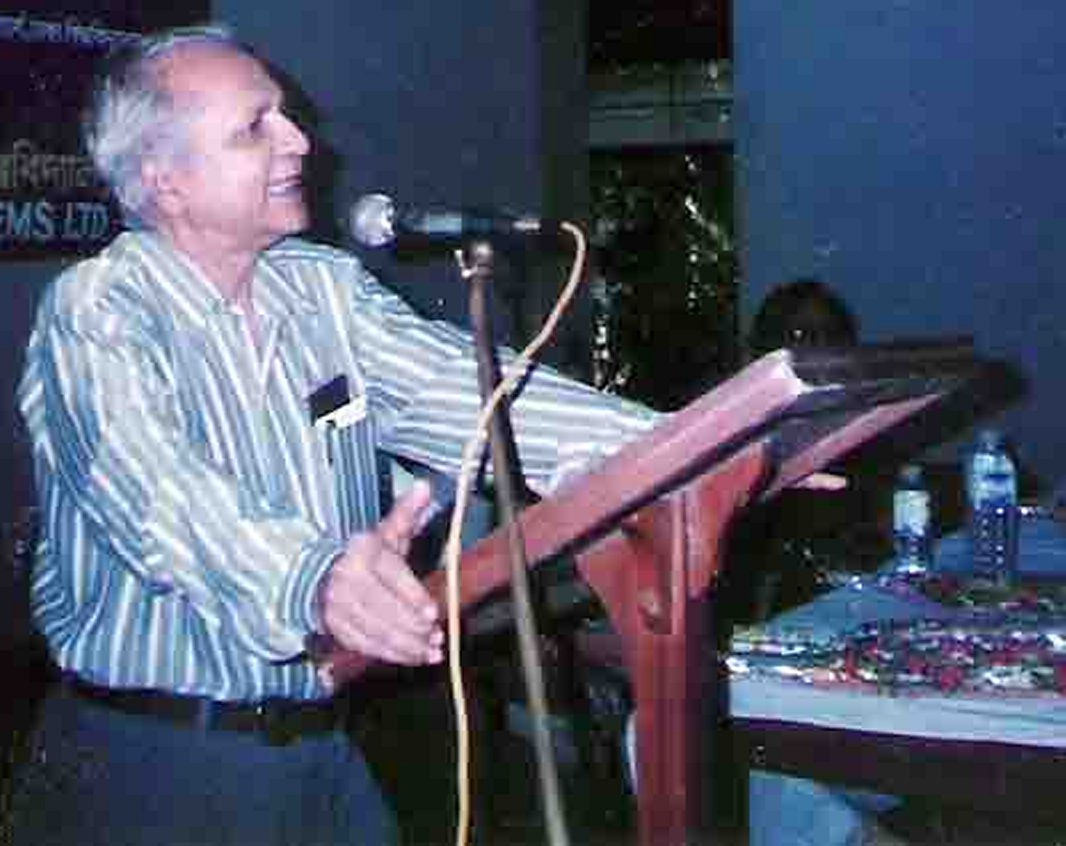
Abdullah-Al-Muti

- 26 January – Muhammad Sohrab Hossain, politician (b. 1922)
- 14 February – Badrul Haider Chowdhury, Chief Justice of Bangladesh (b. 1925)
- 14 May – Shawkat Osman, writer (b. 1917)
- 1 June – Brojen Das, swimmer (b. 1927)
- 12 August – Gazi Shamsur Rahman, lawyer, writer, translator, columnist. and television personality (b. 1921).
- 8 October – Jashim, film actor (b. 1950)
- 30 November – Abdullah-Al-Muti, educationist (b. 1930)

== See also ==
- 1990s in Bangladesh
- List of Bangladeshi films of 1998
- Timeline of Bangladeshi history
