= 1996 in Bangladesh =

- Centuries: 20th; 21st
- Decades: 1970s; 1980s; 1990s; 2000s; 2010s
- See also: Other events of 1996; List of years in Bangladesh

1996 (MCMXCVI) was a leap year starting on Monday of the Gregorian calendar, the 1996th year of the Common Era (CE) and Anno Domini (AD) designations, the 996th year of the 2nd millennium, the 96th year of the 20th century, and the 7th year of the 1990s decade.

The year 1996 was the 25th year after the independence of Bangladesh. It was also the first year of the first term of the Government of Sheikh Hasina.

== Incumbents ==
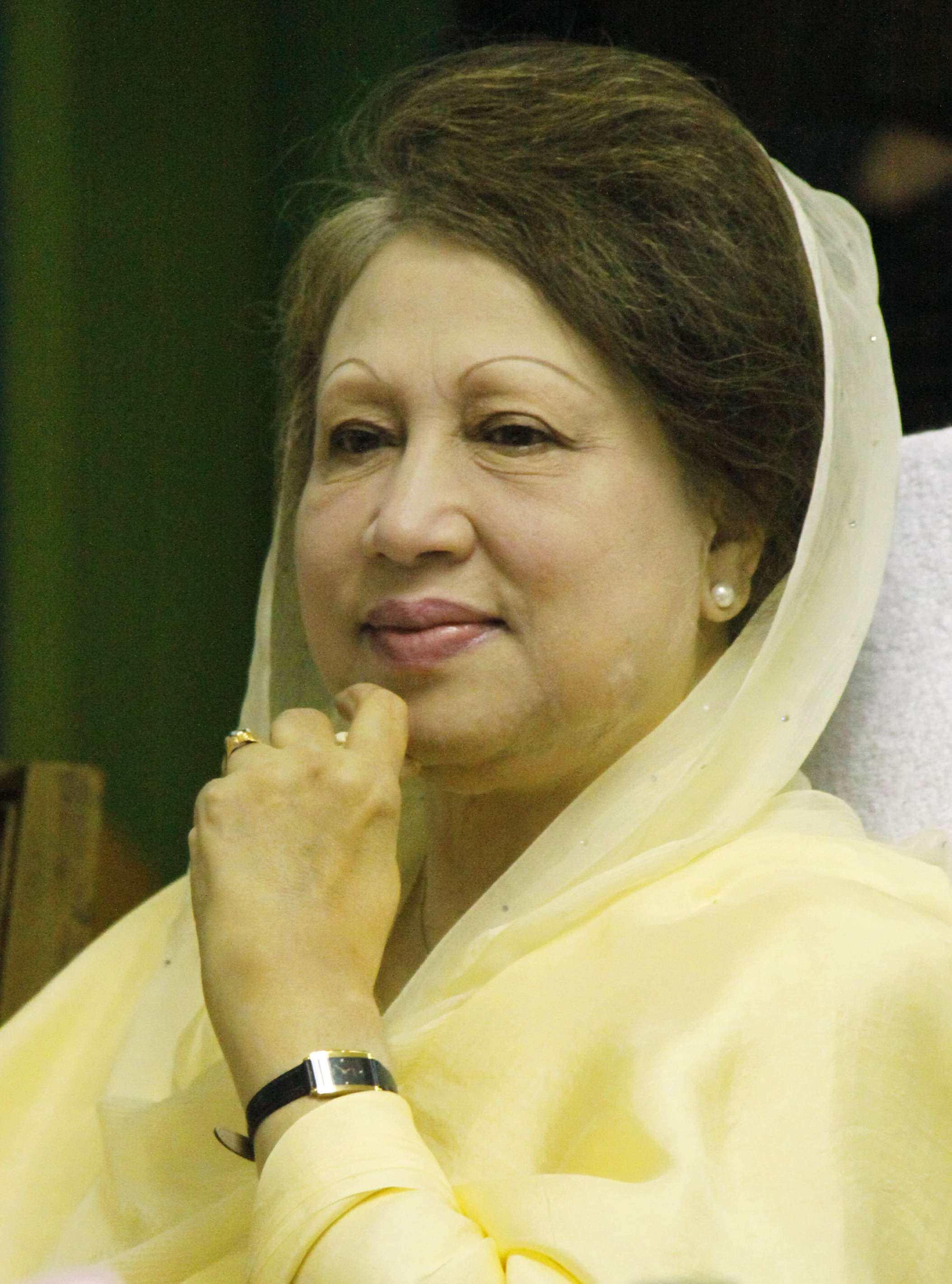
Khaleda
Zia

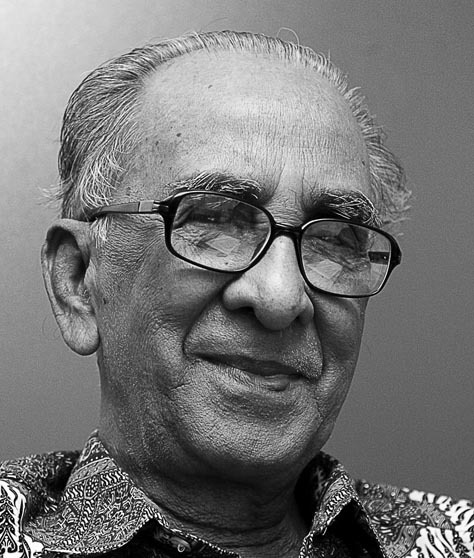
Habibur
Rahman

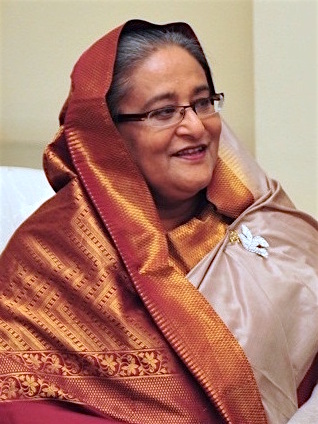
Sheikh
Hasina

- President: Abdur Rahman Biswas (until 9 October), Shahabuddin Ahmed (starting 9 October)
- Prime Minister:
  - until 30 March: Khaleda Zia
  - 30 March – 23 June: Muhammad Habibur Rahman
  - starting 23 June: Sheikh Hasina
- Chief Justice: A.T.M Afzal

== Demography ==
Demographic Indicators for Bangladesh in 1996
Population, total	117,649,927
Population density (per km^{2})	903.8
Population growth (annual %)	2.1%
Male to Female Ratio (every 100 Female)	106.0
Urban population (% of total)	22.1%
Birth rate, crude (per 1,000 people)	30.2
Death rate, crude (per 1,000 people)	7.9
Mortality rate, under 5 (per 1,000 live births)	108
Life expectancy at birth, total (years)	62.8
Fertility rate, total (births per woman)	3.6

== Climate ==
Climate data for Bangladesh in 1996
Month	Jan	Feb	Mar	Apr	May	Jun	Jul	Aug	Sep	Oct	Nov	Dec	Year
Daily mean °C (°F)	18.9 (66.0)	20.4 (68.7)	26.3 (79.3)	27.8 (82.0)	28.6 (83.5)	28.1 (82.6)	28.2 (82.8)	27.8 (82.0)	28.1 (82.6)	26.5 (79.7)	23.5 (74.3)	19.2 (66.6)	25.3 (77.5)
Average precipitation mm (inches)	6.1 (0.24)	33.7 (1.33)	49.7 (1.96)	202.2 (7.96)	232.1 (9.14)	405.1 (15.95)	418.3 (16.47)	406.9 (16.02)	278.4 (10.96)	245.4 (9.66)	4.4 (0.17)	0.2 (0.01)	2,282.5 (89.87)
Source: Climatic Research Unit (CRU) of University of East Anglia (UEA)

== Economy ==
Key Economic Indicators for Bangladesh in 1996
National Income
	Current US$	Current BDT	% of GDP
GDP	$46.4 billion	BDT1,899.3 billion	
GDP growth (annual %)	4.5%		
GDP per capita	$394.7	BDT16,144	
Agriculture, value added	$10.8 billion	BDT441.9 billion	23.3%
Industry, value added	$10.1 billion	BDT411.9 billion	21.7%
Services, etc., value added	$23.3 billion	BDT952.0 billion	50.1%
Balance of Payment
	Current US$	Current BDT	% of GDP
Current account balance	-$991.4 million		-2.1%
Imports of goods and services	$7,450.6 million	BDT310.9 billion	16.4%
Exports of goods and services	$4,614.1 million	BDT184.4 billion	9.7%
Foreign direct investment, net inflows	$13.5 million		0.0%
Personal remittances, received	$1,344.7 million		2.9%
Total reserves (includes gold) at year end	$1,869.5 million		
Total reserves in months of imports	2.9		

Note: For the year 1996 average official exchange rate for BDT was 41.79 per US$.

== Events ==
- 9 January - At least 16 people were killed and more than 100 injured in the head-on collision of two trains near Chandpur.
- 15 February - The Sixth National Parliamentary Elections 1996 was held in Bangladesh on 15 February 1996. They were boycotted by most opposition parties, and saw voter turnout drop to just 21%. The result was a victory for the Bangladesh Nationalist Party (BNP), which won 300 of the 300 elected seats.
- 22 March – Inauguration of the Liberation War Museum in Dhaka.
- 25 March – Following escalating political turmoil, the sitting Parliament enacted the thirteenth constitutional amendment to allow a neutral caretaker government to assume power and conduct new parliamentary elections. On 30 March the President appointed former Chief Justice Muhammad Habibur Rahman as Chief Advisor (a position equivalent to prime minister) in the interim government. A new election was scheduled for 12 June 1996.
- 14 May – Over 400 are killed as a tornado strikes northern Bangladesh.
- 19 May – Failed attempt of coup d'état by Lt. Gen. Abu Saleh Mohammad Nasim, Bir Bikrom.
- 12 June – The Seventh National Parliamentary Elections 1996 were held in Bangladesh on 12 June 1996. The result was a victory for the Bangladesh Awami League, which won 146 of the 300 seats, beginning Sheikh Hasina's first term as Prime Minister. Voter turnout was 75.6%, the highest to date. This election was the second to be held in 1996, following controversial elections held in February a few months earlier.
- 5 November – Starting with a base of 350 points, the share price index of the Dhaka Stock Exchange rose as high as 3,648.75 points. The following day it started falling and it came down to 462 points in May 1999. The crash left millions of investors penniless.
- 12 December – A 30-year treaty on sharing of the Ganges water was signed between India and Bangladesh.

=== Awards and Recognitions ===
==== Independence Day Award ====
Recipients	Area	Note
Moulavi Abdul Hashim	literature	
Anjuman Mufidul Islam	social work	organization
Mohammad Abdul Jabbar	music	
Sabina Yasmin	music	
Professor A. M. Zahurul Haq	science and technology	
Dr. Kazi Abul Monsur	medical science	
Kazi Salahuddin	sports	
Safiuddin Ahmed	fine arts	

==== Ekushey Padak ====
1. Hasnat Abdul Hye (literature)
2. Rahat Khan (literature)
3. A K M Firoz Alam (music)
4. Muhammad Abdul Hye (education)
5. Sirajul Islam Chowdhury (education)
6. Mohammad Kamruzzaman (journalism)
7. Mohammad Shahjahan (education)

=== Sports ===
- Olympics:
  - Bangladesh sent a delegation to compete in the 1996 Summer Olympics in Atlanta, United States. Bangladesh did not win any medals in the competition.
- Domestic football:
  - Mohammedan SC won 1996 Dhaka Premier Division League title while Abahani KC came out runner-up.

== Births ==
- 15 April – Faraaz Ayaaz Hossain, martyr (d. 2016)

== Deaths ==
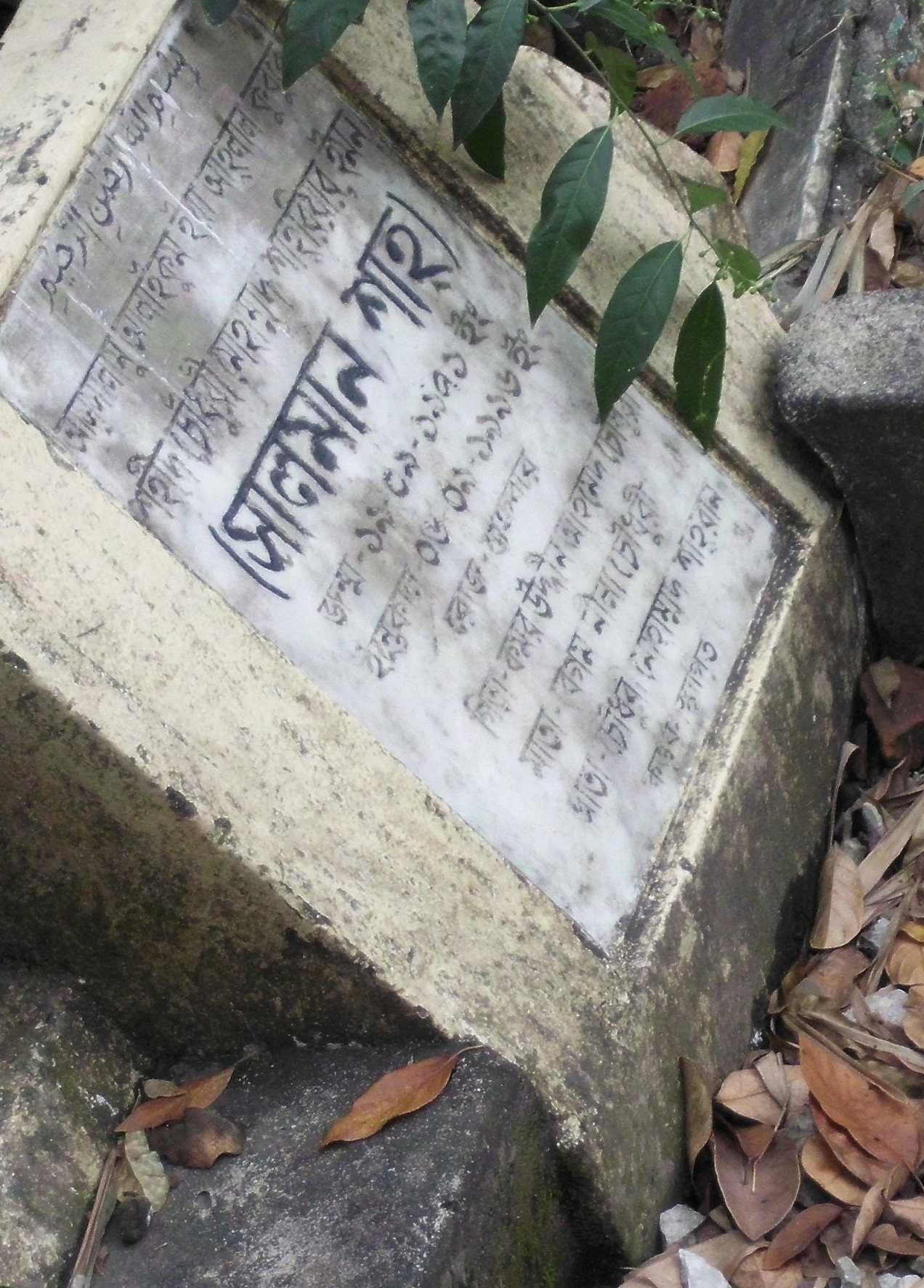
Epitaph of Shah's grave located in Sylhet.

- 10 January – Alamgir M. A. Kabir, social activist (b. 1911)
- 20 February – Kazi Abul Monsur, physician and microbiologist (b. 1918)
- 5 March – Khondaker Mostaq Ahmad, President of Bangladesh (b. 1919)
- 9 April – Fazlul Halim Chowdhury, academic (b. 1930)
- 14 May – Abdul Ahad, music director (b. 1918)
- 31 May – Syed Golam Kibria, journalist (b. 1933)
- 6 September – Mohammad Noman, academic
- 6 September – Salman Shah, movie and TV actor (b. 1971)

== See also ==
- 1990s in Bangladesh
- List of Bangladeshi films of 1996
- Timeline of Bangladeshi history
