= 1994 in Bangladesh =

- Centuries: 20th; 21st
- Decades: 1970s; 1980s; 1990s; 2000s; 2010s
- See also: Other events of 1994; List of years in Bangladesh

1994 (MCMXCIV) was a common year starting on Saturday of the Gregorian calendar, the 1994th year of the Common Era (CE) and Anno Domini (AD) designations, the 994th year of the 2nd millennium, the 94th year of the 20th century, and the 5th year of the 1990s decade.

The year 1994 was the 23rd year after the independence of Bangladesh. It was the fourth year of the first term of the government of Khaleda Zia. The year was characterized by the continuous boycott of parliament by the opposition parties over the demand of a neutral Caretaker Government to oversee future elections.

== Incumbents ==
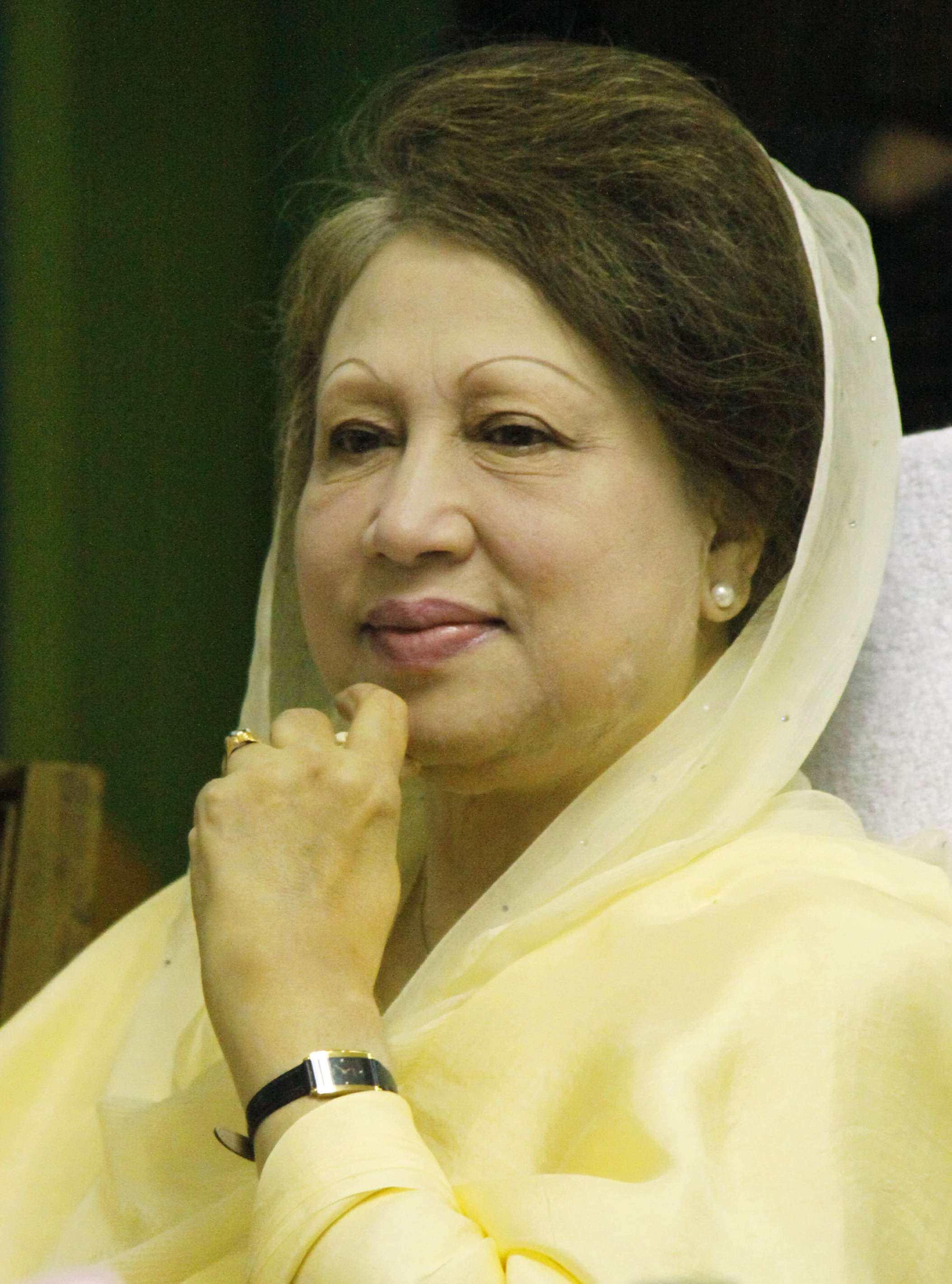
Khaleda
Zia

- President: Abdur Rahman Biswas
- Prime Minister: Khaleda Zia
- Chief Justice: Shahabuddin Ahmed

== Demography ==
Demographic Indicators for Bangladesh in 1994
Population, total	112,737,684
Population density (per km^{2})	866.1
Population growth (annual %)	2.1%
Male to Female Ratio (every 100 Female)	106.2
Urban population (% of total)	21.3%
Birth rate, crude (per 1,000 people)	31.7
Death rate, crude (per 1,000 people)	8.7
Mortality rate, under 5 (per 1,000 live births)	120
Life expectancy at birth, total (years)	61.2
Fertility rate, total (births per woman)	3.8

== Climate ==
Climate data for Bangladesh in 1994
Month	Jan	Feb	Mar	Apr	May	Jun	Jul	Aug	Sep	Oct	Nov	Dec	Year
Daily mean °C (°F)	18.6 (65.5)	19.7 (67.5)	25.1 (77.2)	27.0 (80.6)	28.6 (83.5)	28.0 (82.4)	28.4 (83.1)	28.2 (82.8)	28.2 (82.8)	26.7 (80.1)	23.0 (73.4)	18.8 (65.8)	25.1 (77.2)
Average precipitation mm (inches)	13.5 (0.53)	31.6 (1.24)	94.6 (3.72)	144.2 (5.68)	206.1 (8.11)	341.8 (13.46)	359.1 (14.14)	373.7 (14.71)	184.1 (7.25)	109.6 (4.31)	10.8 (0.43)	0.0 (0.0)	1,869.2 (73.59)
Source: Climatic Research Unit (CRU) of University of East Anglia (UEA)

=== Cyclone ===
A cyclone with a velocity of 210 kilometres (130 mi) per hour struck the coastal area of Cox's Bazar on 2 May causing extensive damage to the districts of Cox's Bazar and Bandarban. As a result of the early warning and subsequent evacuation of about 450,000 people, the loss of life was minimal. According to official estimates 133 (including 84 refugees) died and 3,559 were injured.

== Economy ==
Key Economic Indicators for Bangladesh in 1994
National Income
	Current US$	Current BDT	% of GDP
GDP	$33.8 billion	BDT1,354.1 billion	
GDP growth (annual %)	3.9%		
GDP per capita	$299.5	BDT12,011	
Agriculture, value added	$9.0 billion	BDT361.9 billion	26.7%
Industry, value added	$7.9 billion	BDT317.8 billion	23.5%
Services, etc., value added	$15.6 billion	BDT626.7 billion	46.3%
Balance of Payment
	Current US$	Current BDT	% of GDP
Current account balance	$199.6 million		.6%
Imports of goods and services	$5,375.6 million	BDT187.7 billion	13.9%
Exports of goods and services	$3,524.2 million	BDT121.9 billion	9.0%
Foreign direct investment, net inflows	$11.1 million		0.0%
Personal remittances, received	$1,150.9 million		3.4%
Total reserves (includes gold) at year end	$3,174.8 million		
Total reserves in months of imports	6.8		

Note: For the year 1994 average official exchange rate for BDT was 40.21 per US$.

== Events ==
- 20 March – BNP won the by-polls to Magura-2 parliamentary constituency, which had fallen vacant following the Awami League MP's death; but the victory was tainted with allegation of widespread rigging – which eventually strengthened the oppositions claim for a Caretaker government to oversee future elections.
- 22 August – Ikhtiaruddin Bablu, deputy mayor Khulna City Corporation, was gunned down.
- 6 September – The Dhanmondi residence of the founding father and President of Bangladesh Sheikh Mujibur Rahman was handed over to Bangabandhu Memorial Trust to turn it into a museum.
- 23 October – Khulna Bangladesh Islami Chhatra Shibir leader Abul Kashem Pathan was shot dead by activists of the Bangladesh Jatiotabadi Chatra Dal

=== Awards and recognitions ===
==== International Recognition ====
- Dr. Muhammad Yunus wins the World Food Prize

==== Independence Day Award ====
Recipients	Area	Note
Directorate of the Geological Survey of Bangladesh	science and technology)	organization
Ahsan Habib	literature	posthumous
Atiqur Rahman	sports	
Mobarak Hossain Khan	music	
Grameen Bank	rural development	organization

==== Ekushey Padak ====
1. Sarder Jayenuddin (literature)
2. Humayun Ahmed (literature)
3. Ali Monsur (drama)
4. Abu Taher (fine arts)
5. Nina Hamid (vocal music)
6. Shahadat Hossain Khan (instrumental music)
7. Mohammad Noman (education)
8. Hasanuzzaman Khan (journalism)

=== Sports ===
- Asian Games:
  - Bangladesh participated in the 1994 Asian Games which were held from 2 to 16 October 1994 in Hiroshima, Japan. Bangladesh national kabaddi team won the only silver medal for the country in their event in the tournament. The other noticeable achievement in the tournament was that Bangladesh ranked 7th in the field hockey.
- Domestic football:
  - Abahani Limited Dhaka won 1994 Dhaka Premier Division League title while Muktijoddha Sangsad KC became runner-up.
  - Muktijoddha SKC also won Bangladesh Federation Cup title.

== Births ==
- 2 February – Shukhtara Rahman, cricketer
- 5 April – Shamoli Ray, archer
- 16 September – Yeasin Khan, footballer
- 13 October – Liton Das, cricketer

== Deaths ==
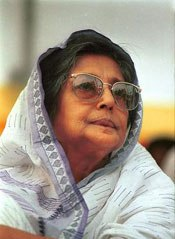
Jahanara Imam

- 21 May – Mohammad Nasiruddin, journalist (b. 1888)
- 28 May – Ashab Uddin Ahmad, author (b. 1914)
- 30 May – Mafiz Ali Chowdhury, politician (b, 1919)
- 26 June – Jahanara Imam, writer and activist (b. 1929)
- 10 October – SM Sultan, painter (b, 1923)

== See also ==
- 1990s in Bangladesh
- List of Bangladeshi films of 1994
- Timeline of Bangladeshi history
