= 1992 in Bangladesh =

- Centuries: 20th; 21st
- Decades: 1970s; 1980s; 1990s; 2000s; 2010s
- See also: Other events of 1992; List of years in Bangladesh

1992 (MCMXCII) was a leap year starting on Wednesday of the Gregorian calendar, the 1992nd year of the Common Era (CE) and Anno Domini (AD) designations, the 992nd year of the 2nd millennium, the 92nd year of the 20th century, and the 3rd year of the 1990s decade.

The year 1992 was the 21st year after the independence of Bangladesh. It was the second year of the first term of the government of Khaleda Zia.

== Incumbents ==
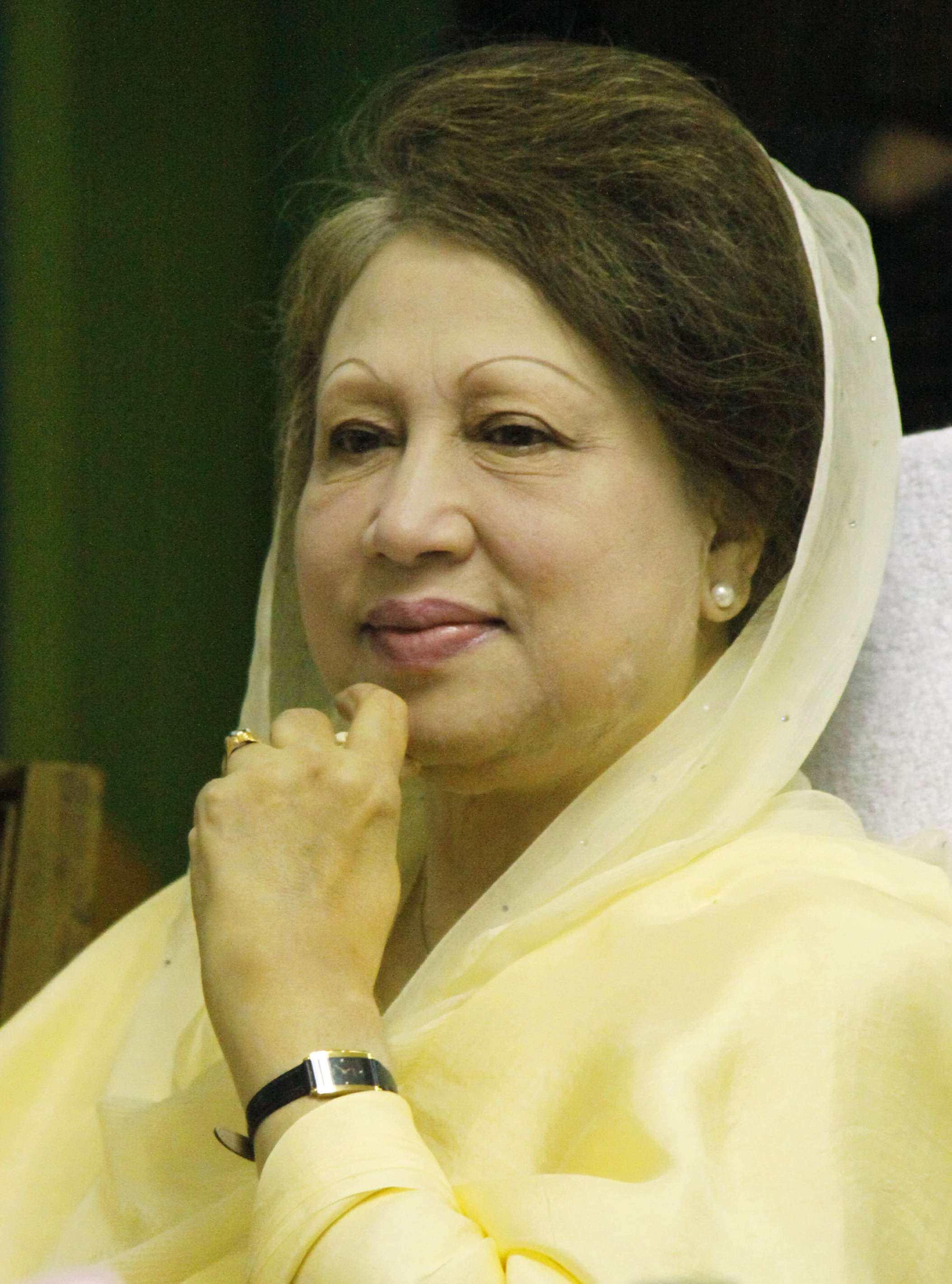
Khaleda
Zia

- President: Abdur Rahman Biswas
- Prime Minister: Khaleda Zia
- Chief Justice: Shahabuddin Ahmed

== Demography ==
Demographic Indicators for Bangladesh in 1992
Population, total	107,983,708
Population density (per km^{2})	829.6
Population growth (annual %)	2.2%
Male to Female Ratio (every 100 Female)	106.4
Urban population (% of total)	20.6%
Birth rate, crude (per 1,000 people)	33.3
Death rate, crude (per 1,000 people)	9.5
Mortality rate, under 5 (per 1,000 live births)	132
Life expectancy at birth, total (years)	59.6
Fertility rate, total (births per woman)	4.1

== Climate ==
Climate data for Bangladesh in 1992
Month	Jan	Feb	Mar	Apr	May	Jun	Jul	Aug	Sep	Oct	Nov	Dec	Year
Daily mean °C (°F)	17.5 (63.5)	19.2 (66.6)	25.3 (77.5)	28.3 (82.9)	27.4 (81.3)	28.4 (83.1)	27.7 (81.9)	28.1 (82.6)	27.8 (82.0)	26.5 (79.7)	23. (73)	18.3 (64.9)	24.8 (76.6)
Average precipitation mm (inches)	5.3 (0.21)	45. (1.8)	15.9 (0.63)	43.4 (1.71)	197. (7.8)	280. (11.0)	487.2 (19.18)	329.1 (12.96)	309.6 (12.19)	145.4 (5.72)	8.5 (0.33)	3.5 (0.14)	1,869.9 (73.62)
Source: Climatic Research Unit (CRU) of University of East Anglia (UEA)

=== Cyclone ===
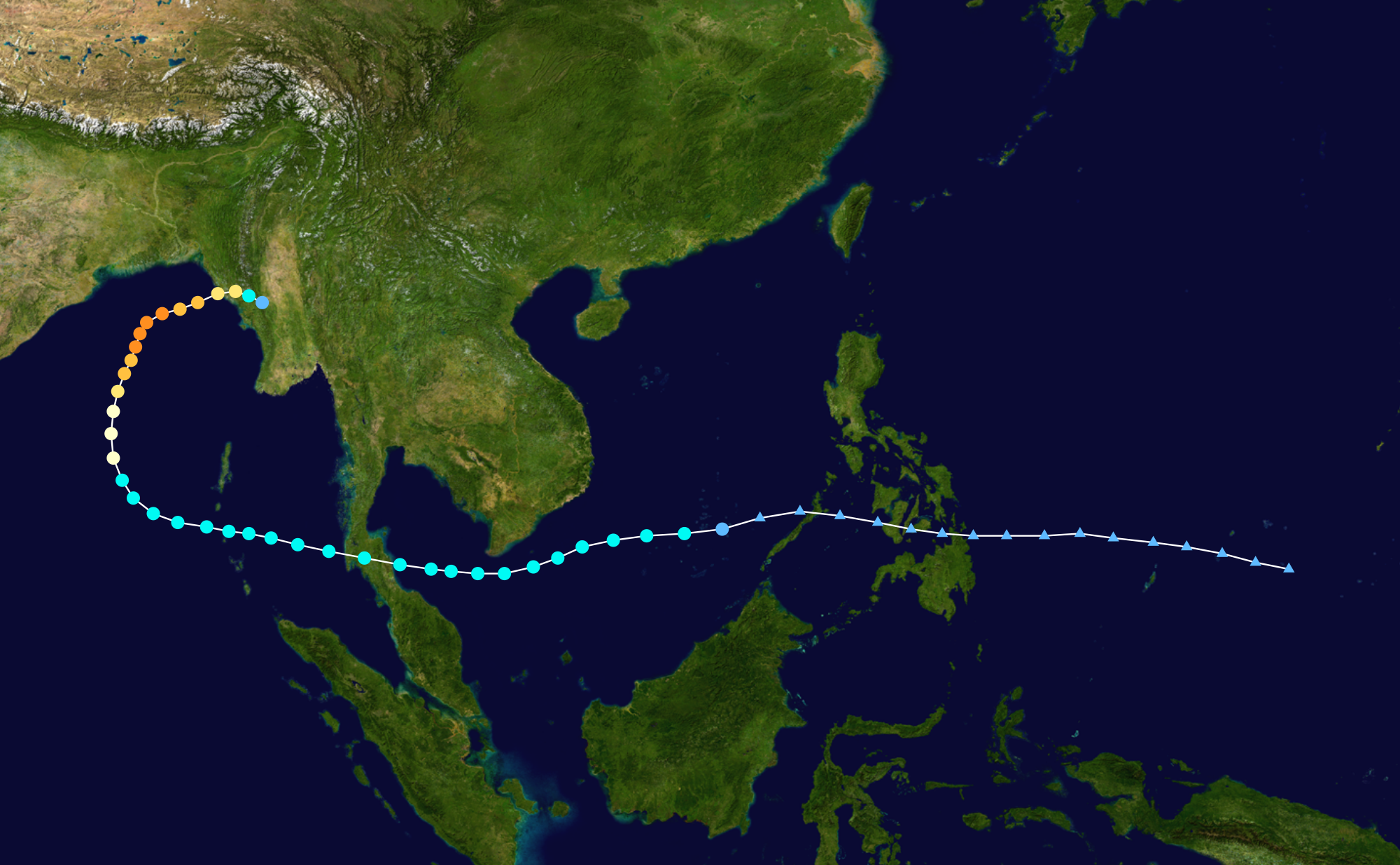
Map plotting the storm's track and intensity, according to the Saffir–Simpson scale Map key Saffir–Simpson scale Tropical depression (≤38 mph, ≤62 km/h) Tropical storm (39–73 mph, 63–118 km/h) Category 1 (74–95 mph, 119–153 km/h) Category 2 (96–110 mph, 154–177 km/h) Category 3 (111–129 mph, 178–208 km/h) Category 4 (130–156 mph, 209–251 km/h) Category 5 (≥157 mph, ≥252 km/h) Unknown Storm type Tropical cyclone Subtropical cyclone Extratropical cyclone, remnant low, tropical disturbance, or monsoon depression

A powerful tropical cyclone, named Cyclone Forrest prompted the evacuation of 600,000 people in Bangladesh in late November 1992. Originating from an area of disturbed weather near the Caroline Islands on 9 November, Forrest was classified as a tropical depression three days later over the South China Sea. Tracking generally west, the system steadily organized into a tropical storm, passing Vietnam to the south, before striking Thailand along the Malay Peninsula on 15 November. Once over the Bay of Bengal, Forrest turned northward on 17 November and significantly intensified. It reached its peak intensity on 20 November as a Category 4-equivalent cyclone on the Saffir–Simpson hurricane scale with winds of 230 km/h (145 mph). Hostile environmental conditions soon affected the cyclone as it turned abruptly east-northeastward. Forrest made landfall in northwestern Myanmar as a weakening system on 21 November before dissipating early the next day.

On 20 November, as Forrest reached its peak intensity, fears arose across Bangladesh that a repeat of the catastrophic April 1991 cyclone would take place. As a result, mass evacuation plans were enacted across coastal areas of the country, with plans to relocate up to 2 million people. But the storm abruptly turned eastward, and the successful evacuation of 600,000 residents spared countless lives. Only two deaths were recorded and overall damage was light, though half of all homes on St. Martin's Island were damaged.

== Economy ==
Key Economic Indicators for Bangladesh in 1992
National Income
	Current US$	Current BDT	% of GDP
GDP	$31.7 billion	BDT1,195.4 billion	
GDP growth (annual %)	5.4%		
GDP per capita	$293.6	BDT11,070	
Agriculture, value added	$9.7 billion	BDT364.8 billion	30.5%
Industry, value added	$6.9 billion	BDT259.6 billion	21.7%
Services, etc., value added	$14.1 billion	BDT530.6 billion	44.4%
Balance of Payment
	Current US$	Current BDT	% of GDP
Current account balance	$180.8 million		.6%
Imports of goods and services	$4,142.6 million	BDT147.6 billion	12.3%
Exports of goods and services	$2,581.2 million	BDT90.7 billion	7.6%
Foreign direct investment, net inflows	$3.7 million		0.0%
Personal remittances, received	$911.8 million		2.9%
Total reserves (includes gold) at year end	$1,853.5 million		
Total reserves in months of imports	5.2		

Note: For the year 1992 average official exchange rate for BDT was 38.95 per US$.

== Events ==
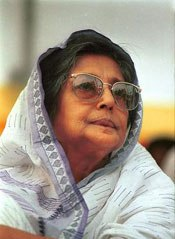
Jahanara Imam

- 25 March – Aminul Islam Biman, a leader of Jamaat-affiliated Islami Chhatra Shibir, was killed by members of the Communist Party of Bangladesh.
- 26 March – The Ghatak-Dalal Nirmul Committee set up mock trials known as Gono Adalat (People's Court) led by Jahanara Imam in Dhaka and 'sentenced' persons they accused of being war criminals.
- 10 April – The Logang massacre took place in Logang village in the Khagrachari District along the border with India. The massacre allegedly involved Bengali civilians, border guards, and the army who attacked the Jumma people with axes, hatchets, and guns, burning down all the houses. The government investigation committee announced that only 12 people have died, while the unofficial estimate puts the death-toll to around 400.
- 31 July - Ratan Sen, leader of the Communist Party of Bangladesh, was killed in front of the Khulna DC Office.
- 21 October – The Bangladesh Open University was established with its main campus in Board Bazar, Gazipur District, Dhaka Division.
- 7 December – There were a series of violence against the Bengali Hindus in protest against the demolition of Babri Masjid and violence against Muslims in India. the Dhakeshwari temple was attacked. The Bholanath Giri Ashram in Dhaka was attacked and looted. Hindu-owned jewellery shops were looted in old Dhaka. Hindu houses in Rayerbazar were set on fire.
- 8 December – Hindus were attacked in Kutubdia Upazila in Cox's Bazar District. 14 Hindu temples were attacked, eight of them were burnt and six damaged. 51 Hindu houses in Ali Akbar Dale and another 30 in Choufaldandi.
- A third of the 250,000 Rohingyas of Burma flees into Bangladesh.

=== Awards and recognitions ===
==== International Recognition ====
- Gonoshasthaya Kendra / Zafrullah Chowdhury was awarded the Right Livelihood Award.

==== Independence Day Award ====
Recipients	Area	Note
Bangladesh Rice Research Institute	science and technology	organization
Kazi Zaker Husain	education	
Zahir Raihan	literature	posthumous

==== Ekushey Padak ====
1. Dewan Mohammad Azraf (literature)
2. Mobashwer Ali (literature)
3. Emajuddin Ahamed (education)
4. Khan Mohammad Salek (education)
5. Gias Kamal Chowdhury (journalism)
6. Ataus Samad (journalism)
7. Shahnaz Rahmatullah (music)
8. Amjad Hossain (drama)
9. Hashem Khan (fine arts)

=== Sports ===
- Olympics:
  - Bangladesh sent a delegation to compete in the 1992 Summer Olympics in Barcelona, Spain. Bangladesh did not win any medals in the competition.
- Domestic football:
  - Abahani KC won 1992 Dhaka First Division League title while Mohammedan SC came out runner-up.
- Cricket:
  - The 1992–93 SAARC Quadrangular cricket Tournament started in Dhaka, Bangladesh in December 1992 amidst great enthusiasm and excitement. 4 teams, the 'A' teams from neighbouring India, Pakistan and Sri Lanka, and the full national team of the host country participated in the event. Due to the volatile political situation arising in the sub-continent, the tournament had to be abandoned at the League stage. Thus, there was no winners of the tournament.

== Births ==
- 7 February – Taijul Islam, cricketer
- 5 August – Abul Hasan, cricketer
- 24 October – Pori Moni, actor
- 17 December – Asif Ahmed, cricketer
- 16 December – Anamul Haque, cricketer

== Deaths ==
- 29 April – Ghulam Faruque Khan, Governor of East Pakistan (b. 1899)
- 7 July – Fakhruddin Ahmed, Minister of East Pakistan (b. 1905)

== See also ==
- 1990s in Bangladesh
- List of Bangladeshi films of 1992
- Timeline of Bangladeshi history
