= 1991 in Bangladesh =

- Centuries: 20th; 21st
- Decades: 1970s; 1980s; 1990s; 2000s; 2010s
- See also: Other events of 1991; List of years in Bangladesh

1991 (MCMXCI) was a common year starting on Tuesday of the Gregorian calendar, the 1991st year of the Common Era (CE) and Anno Domini (AD) designations, the 991st year of the 2nd millennium, the 91st year of the 20th century, and the 2nd year of the 1990s decade.

The year 1991 was the 20th year after the independence of Bangladesh. It was the first year of the first term of the government of Khaleda Zia.

== Incumbents ==
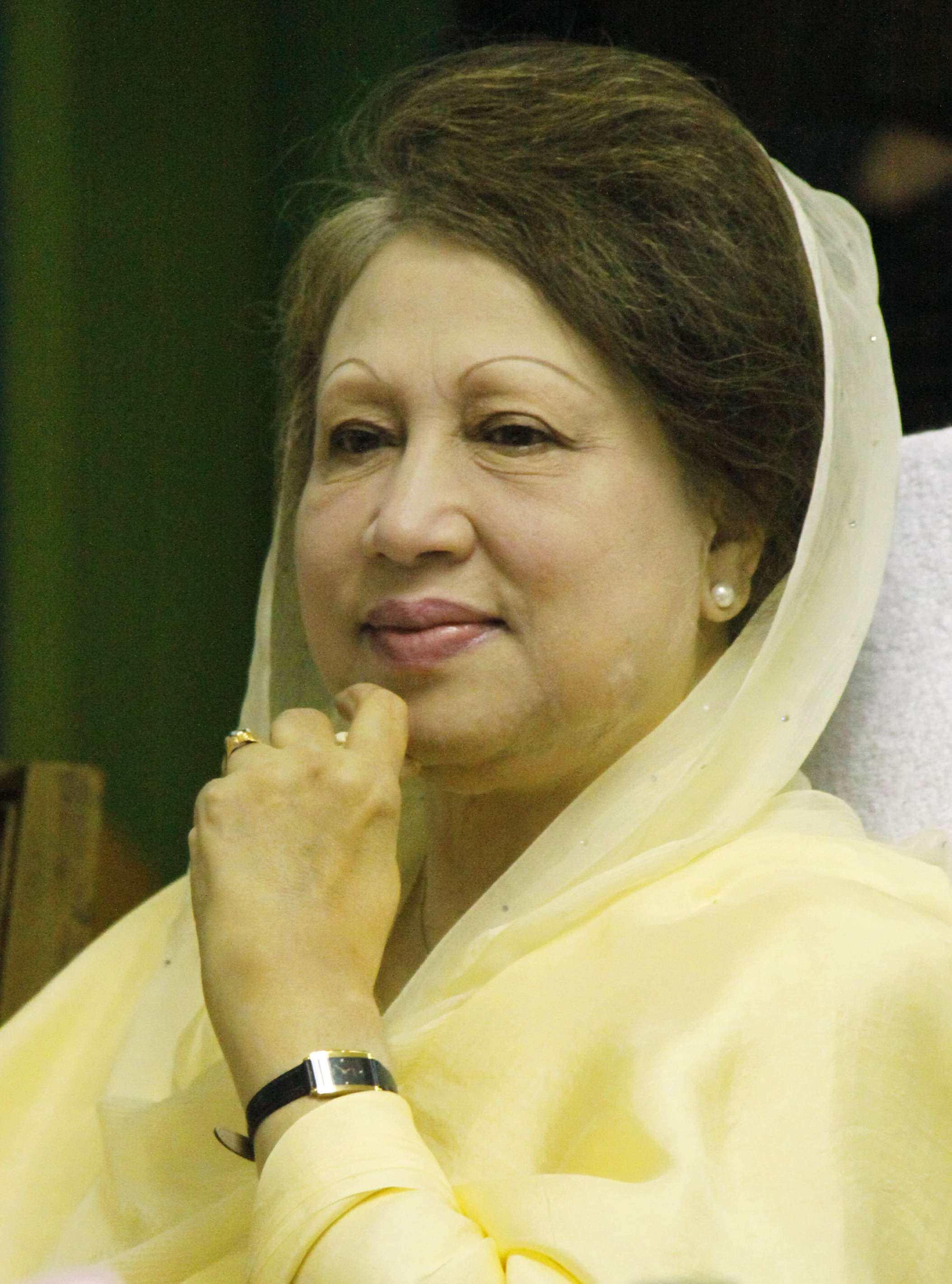
Khaleda
Zia

- President: Shahabuddin Ahmed (acting) (until 10 October), Abdur Rahman Biswas (starting 10 October)
- Prime Minister: Khaleda Zia (starting 20 March)
- Vice President: Shahabuddin Ahmed (until 10 October); post abolished
- Chief Justice: Shahabuddin Ahmed

== Demography ==
Demographic Indicators for Bangladesh in 1991
Population, total	105,599,125
Population density (per km^{2})	811.2
Population growth (annual %)	2.3%
Male to Female Ratio (every 100 Female)	106.4
Urban population (% of total)	20.3%
Birth rate, crude (per 1,000 people)	34.2
Death rate, crude (per 1,000 people)	9.9
Mortality rate, under 5 (per 1,000 live births)	138
Life expectancy at birth, total (years)	58.9
Fertility rate, total (births per woman)	4.3

== Climate ==
Climate data for Bangladesh in 1991
Month	Jan	Feb	Mar	Apr	May	Jun	Jul	Aug	Sep	Oct	Nov	Dec	Year
Daily mean °C (°F)	17.4 (63.3)	21.8 (71.2)	26. (79)	27.4 (81.3)	27.4 (81.3)	27.7 (81.9)	28.2 (82.8)	28.2 (82.8)	27.4 (81.3)	26.6 (79.9)	22.4 (72.3)	18.6 (65.5)	24.9 (76.8)
Average precipitation mm (inches)	13.8 (0.54)	22.8 (0.90)	38.8 (1.53)	261.1 (10.28)	372.5 (14.67)	359.4 (14.15)	430.8 (16.96)	403.6 (15.89)	516.2 (20.32)	218.4 (8.60)	25.5 (1.00)	29.3 (1.15)	2,692.1 (105.99)
Source: Climatic Research Unit (CRU) of University of East Anglia (UEA)

=== Cyclone ===
The 1991 Bangladesh cyclone (IMD designation: BOB 01, JTWC designation: 02B) was among the deadliest tropical cyclones on record. On the night of 29 April 1991, it struck the Chittagong district of southeastern Bangladesh with winds of around 250 km/h (155 mph). The storm forced a 6-metre (20 ft) storm surge inland over a wide area, killing at least 138,866 people and leaving as many as 10 million homeless.

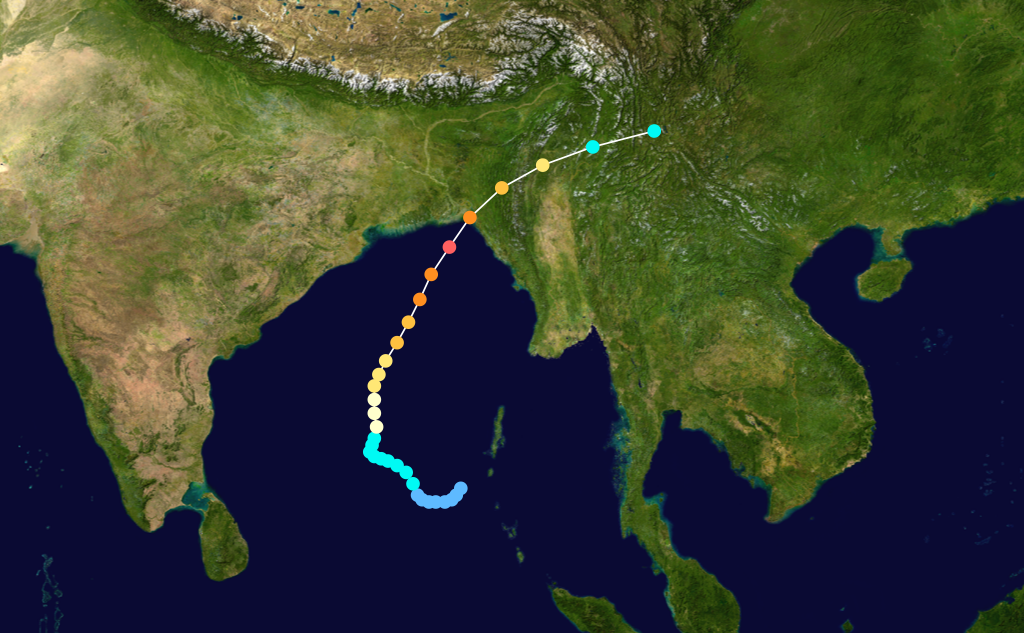
Map plotting the storm's track and intensity, according to the Saffir–Simpson scale Map key Saffir–Simpson scale Tropical depression (≤38 mph, ≤62 km/h) Tropical storm (39–73 mph, 63–118 km/h) Category 1 (74–95 mph, 119–153 km/h) Category 2 (96–110 mph, 154–177 km/h) Category 3 (111–129 mph, 178–208 km/h) Category 4 (130–156 mph, 209–251 km/h) Category 5 (≥157 mph, ≥252 km/h) Unknown Storm type Tropical cyclone Subtropical cyclone Extratropical cyclone, remnant low, tropical disturbance, or monsoon depression

During 22 April 1991, a circulation formed in the southern Bay of Bengal from a persistent area of convection, or thunderstorms, near the equator in the eastern Indian Ocean. Within two days, the cloud mass encompassed most of the Bay of Bengal, focused on an area west of the Andaman and Nicobar Islands. On 24 April, the India Meteorological Department (IMD) (Note: The India Meteorological Department became the official Regional Specialized Meteorological Center for the northern Indian Ocean in 1988.) designated the system as a depression, and the Joint Typhoon Warning Center (JTWC) (Note: The Joint Typhoon Warning Center is a joint United States Navy – United States Air Force task force that issues tropical cyclone warnings for the northern Indian Ocean and other regions.) labeled the system as Tropical Cyclone 02B. Ships in the region reported winds of around 55 km/h (35 mph) around this time.

From its genesis, the storm moved northwestward, being gradually strengthened, amplified by a wind surge from the south. By 26 April, wind shear had decreased to near zero as an anticyclone developed aloft the hurricane. Around this time, the cyclone rounded the western periphery of a large subtropical ridge over Thailand, and the storm turned northward between the ridge to the northeast and northwest. On 28 April, the flow of the southwesterlies caused the cyclone to accelerate to the north-northeast. This flow also amplified the storm's outflow, and the cyclone intensified further. By 12:00 UTC on 28 April, or about 31 hours before landfall, the JTWC was correctly forecasting a landfall in southeastern Bangladesh. Early on 29 April, the IMD upgraded the system to a super cyclonic storm – the highest category – and estimated peak winds of 240 km/h (150 mph). The JTWC estimated peak winds of 160 mph (260 km/h), the equivalent to a Category 5 hurricane on the Saffir–Simpson scale or a super typhoon. The cyclone's high winds and low pressure, a rarity for the Bay of Bengal, ranked it among the most intense cyclones in the basin. At 19:00 UTC on 29 April, the cyclone made landfall about 55 km (35 mi) south of Chittagong in southeastern Bangladesh while slightly below its peak strength. Moving through the mountainous terrain of the Chittagong Hill Tracts, the cyclone quickly weakened and crossed into northeast India, where it degenerated into a remnant low-pressure area.

== Economy ==
Key Economic Indicators for Bangladesh in 1991
National Income
	Current US$	Current BDT	% of GDP
GDP	$31.0 billion	BDT1,105.2 billion	
GDP growth (annual %)	3.5%		
GDP per capita	$293.2	BDT10,466	
Agriculture, value added	$9.8 billion	BDT350.1 billion	31.7%
Industry, value added	$6.5 billion	BDT233.4 billion	21.1%
Services, etc., value added	$13.7 billion	BDT490.2 billion	44.4%
Balance of Payment
	Current US$	Current BDT	% of GDP
Current account balance	$64.6 million		.2%
Imports of goods and services	$3,769.7 million	BDT135.1 billion	12.2%
Exports of goods and services	$2,119.7 million	BDT73.6 billion	6.7%
Foreign direct investment, net inflows	$1.4 million		0.0%
Personal remittances, received	$769.4 million		2.5%
Total reserves (includes gold) at year end	$1,307.9 million		
Total reserves in months of imports	4		

Note: For 1991, the average official exchange rate for BDT was 36.60 per US$.

== Events ==
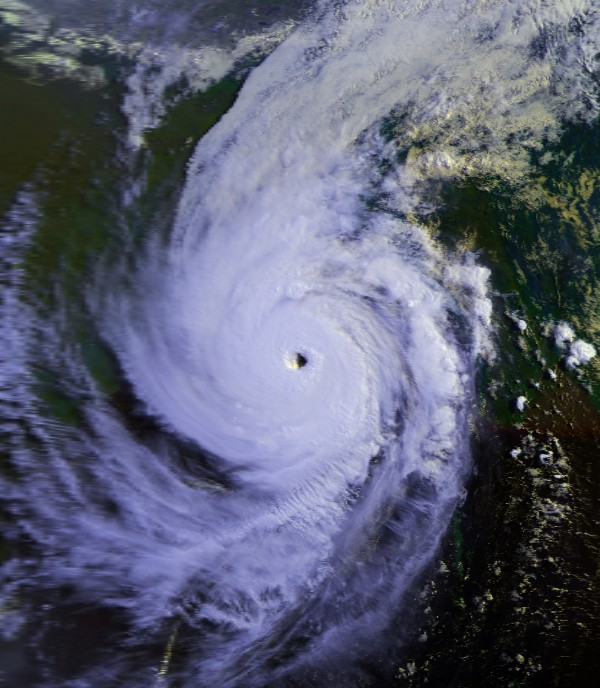
Visible satellite image of the intensifying cyclone on 29 April 1991, southwest of Bangladesh

- 27 February – 1991 Bangladeshi general election, Bangladesh Nationalist Party emerges victorious.
- 29 April – 1991 Bangladesh cyclone kills more than 138,000.
- 10 May – President Bush directs the US military to provide humanitarian assistance to Bangladesh under the umbrella of Operation Sea Angel. A Contingency Joint Task Force under the command of Lieutenant General Henry C. Stackpole, consisting of over 400 Marines and 3,000 sailors, was subsequently sent to Bangladesh to provide food, water, and medical care to nearly two million people.
- 17 July – Government raises the maximum age limit for entering government jobs from 27 years to 30 years.
- 15 September – A constitutional referendum is held where voters are asked, "Should or not the President assent to the Constitution (Twelfth Amendment) Bill, 1991 of the People's Republic of Bangladesh?" The amendments would lead to the reintroduction of parliamentary government, with the President becoming the constitutional head of state, but the Prime Minister the executive head. The result saw 83.6% vote in favour, with a turnout of 35.2%.

=== Awards and recognitions ===
==== Independence Day Award ====
Recipients	Area	Note
Naeb Subedar Shah Alam	Sports	
Shamsur Rahman	Literature	
M Innas Ali	Science and technology	

==== Ekushey Padak ====
1. Ahmed Sharif (education)
2. Kabir Chowdhury (literature)
3. A.F. Salahuddin Ahmed (education)
4. A.M. Harun-ar-Rashid (science)
5. Foyez Ahmad (literature)
6. Sanjida Khatun (literature)
7. Aminul Huq
8. Kazi Abdul Baset (fine arts)

=== Sports ===
- South Asian (Federation) Games:
  - Bangladesh participated in the fifth South Asian Federation Games held in Colombo, Sri Lanka, from 22 to 31 December. With 4 golds, 8 silvers, and 28 bronzes, Bangladesh ended the tournament in the fourth position in the overall points table.
- Domestic football:
  - Brothers Union won the Bangladesh Federation Cup title.

== Births ==
- 12 February – Shahidul Yousuf Sohel, footballer
- 29 May – Rumana Ahmed, cricketer
- 5 August – Sohag Gazi, cricketer
- 30 November – Nasir Hossain, cricketer

== Deaths ==
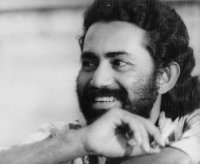
Rudra Mohammad Shahidullah, poet (1956–91)

- 11 March – Principal Abul Kashem, academic (b.1920)
- 31 March – Abul Kashem Khan, industrialist (b.1905)
- 23 April – Lokman Hossain Fakir, musician (b.1924)
- 21 June – Rudra Mohammad Shahidullah, poet (b.1956)
- 3 July – Dolly Anwar, actor (b.1941)
- 11 October – Golam Samdani Koraishi, author (b.1929)
- 3 December – Badruddin Ahmed Siddiky, jurist (b.1915)
- 7 December – Ataur Rahman Khan, politician (b.1905)
- 22 December – Mirza Nurul Huda, politician (b.1919)

== See also ==
- 1990s in Bangladesh
- List of Bangladeshi films of 1991
- Timeline of Bangladeshi history
