= 1990s in Bangladesh =

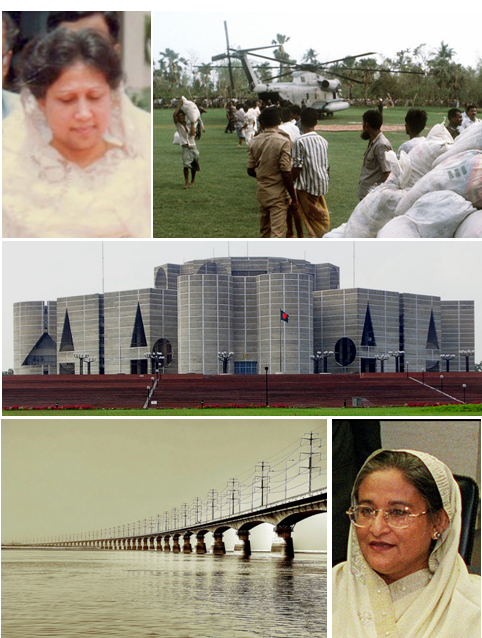
A montage of notable people of and events of Bangladesh in the 1990s including (clockwise from top left): Khaleda Zia in 1991; Bangladeshi civilians and US military personnel unloading aid in the wake of the 1991 Bangladesh cyclone; With the 12 amendment of the constitution Bangladesh moved to parliamentary system of democracy in 1991; Sheikh Hasina dominated the political scene of Bangladesh for most of 1980s as either Prime Minister or Leader of the Opposition; Jamuna Multi-purpose Bridge opened in Bangladesh in June 1998.

The 1990s (pronounced "nineteen-nineties", commonly shortened as the "'90s", pronounced "nineties") was a decade of the Gregorian calendar that began on 1 January 1990, and ended on 31 December 1999. For Bangladesh, this decade was characterized by a transition to democracy, rapid urbanisation and globalization, and a struggle for free and fair elections. The newly earned democracy influenced the cultural activities in the decade.

== Politics and national life ==
=== Transition to democracy ===
The decade began with the country agitating against the rule of incumbent President Ershad. A wide umbrella of political parties united against Ershad. Ziaur Rahman's widow, Khaleda Zia, led the Bangladesh Nationalist Party, which allied with the Bangladesh Awami League, led by Sheikh Mujibur Rahman's daughter Sheikh Hasina. Jamaat-e-Islami Bangladesh and other Islamic parties and alliances joined the opposition ranks. They called for strikes and protests that paralysed the state and its economy. Although the parliament was dissolved, fresh elections were boycotted by the opposition, including Awami League and Jamaat. Students launched an intensifying opposition campaign, which ultimately forced Ershad to step down. On 6 December 1990, Ershad offered his resignation. On 27 February 1991, after two months of widespread civil unrest, an interim government headed by Acting President Chief Justice Shahabuddin Ahmed oversaw what most observers believed to be the nation's most free and fair elections to that date.

=== First Khaleda administration, 1991–96 ===
The centre-right Bangladesh Nationalist Party won a plurality of seats and formed a government with support from the Islamic party Jamaat-I-Islami, with Khaleda Zia, widow of Ziaur Rahman, obtaining the post of prime minister. Only four parties had more than 10 members elected to the 1991 Parliament: the BNP, led by Prime Minister Begum Khaleda Zia; the AL, led by Sheikh Hasina; the Jamaat-I-Islami (JI), led by Ghulam Azam; and the Jatiya Party (JP), led by acting chairman Mizanur Rahman Choudhury while its founder, former President Ershad, served out a prison sentence on corruption charges. The electorate approved still more changes to the constitution, formally re-creating a parliamentary system and returning governing power to the office of the prime minister, as in Bangladesh's original 1972 constitution. In October 1991, members of Parliament elected a new head of state, President Abdur Rahman Biswas.

In March 1994, controversy over a parliamentary by-election, which the opposition claimed the government had rigged, led to an indefinite boycott of Parliament by the entire opposition. The opposition also began a program of repeated general strikes to press its demand that Khaleda Zia's government resign and a caretaker government supervise a general election. Efforts to mediate the dispute, under the auspices of the Commonwealth Secretariat, failed. After another attempt at a negotiated settlement failed narrowly in late December 1994, the opposition resigned en masse from Parliament. The opposition then continued a campaign of marches, demonstrations, and strikes in an effort to force the government to resign. The opposition, including the Bangladesh Awami League, led by Sheikh Hasina, pledged to boycott national elections scheduled for 15 February 1996.

In February, Khaleda Zia was re-elected by a landslide in voting boycotted and denounced as unfair by the three main opposition parties. In March 1996, following escalating political turmoil, the sitting Parliament enacted a constitutional amendment to allow a neutral caretaker government to assume power and conduct new parliamentary elections; former Chief Justice Muhammad Habibur Rahman was named Chief Adviser (a position equivalent to Prime Minister) in the interim government. New parliamentary elections were held in June 1996, and the Awami League won a plurality and formed the government with support from the Jatiya Party led by deposed president Hussain Muhammad Ershad; party leader Sheikh Hasina became prime minister of Bangladesh.

=== First Hasina administration, 1996–2001 ===
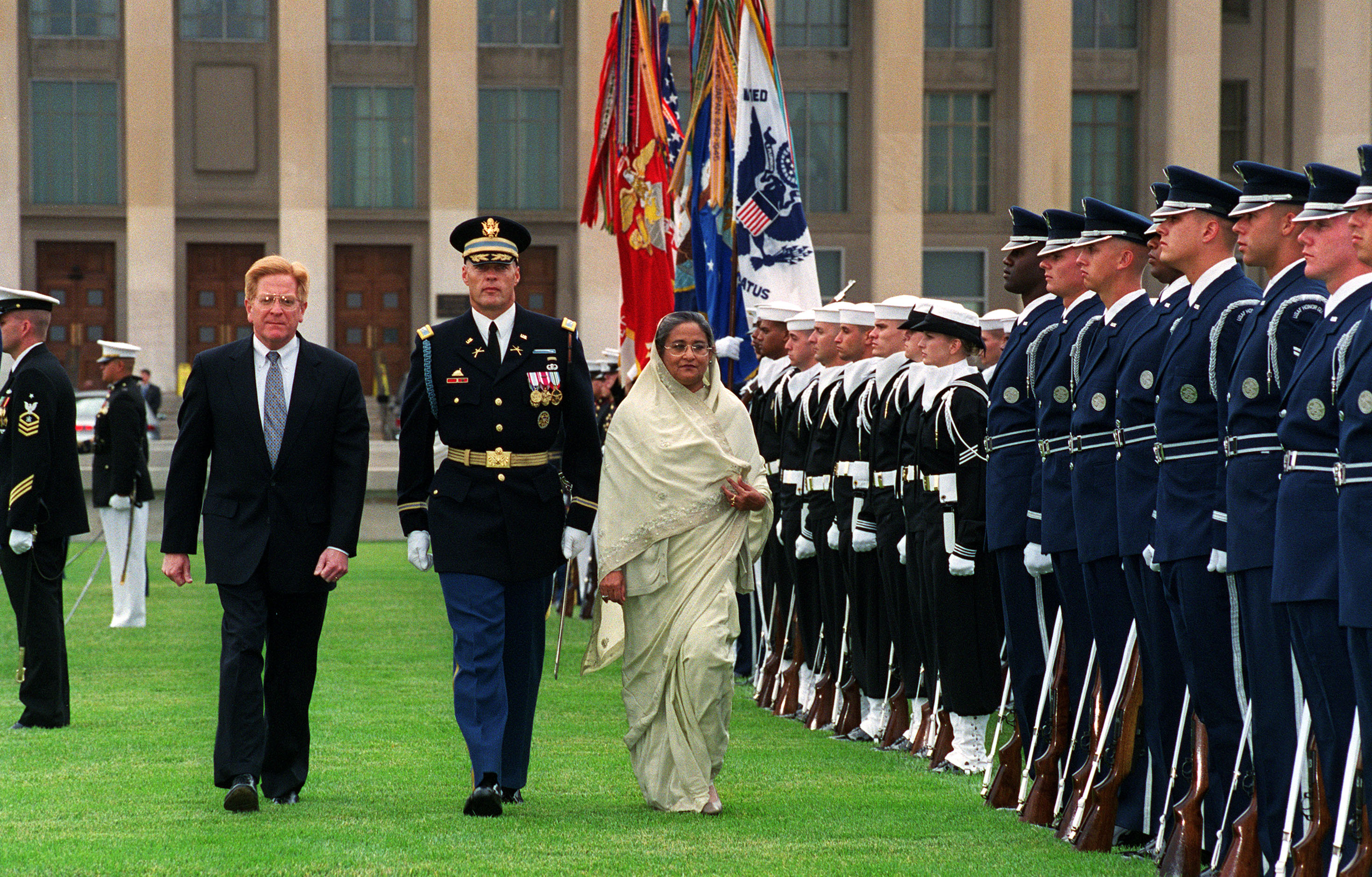
Prime Minister Sheikh Hasina inspects the ceremonial honour guard during a full honour arrival ceremony at the Pentagon on 17 October 2000.

Sheikh Hasina formed what she called a "Government of National Consensus" in June 1996, which included one minister from the Jatiya Party and another from the Jatiya Samajtantrik Dal. The Jatiya Party never entered into a formal coalition arrangement, and party president Hussain Muhammad Ershad withdrew his support from the government in September 1997. Only three parties had more than 10 members elected to the 1996 Parliament: the Awami League, BNP, and Jatiya Party. Jatiya Party president, Ershad, was released from prison on bail in January 1997.

International and domestic election observers found the June 1996 election free and fair, and ultimately, the Bangladesh Nationalist Party decided to join the new Parliament. The BNP soon charged that police and Bangladesh Awami League activists were engaged in large-scale harassment and jailing of opposition activists. At the end of 1996, the Bangladesh Nationalist Party staged a parliamentary walkout over this and other grievances but returned in January 1997 under a four-point agreement with the ruling party. The Bangladesh Nationalist Party asserted that this agreement was never implemented and later staged another walkout in August 1997. The Bangladesh Nationalist Party returned to Parliament under another agreement in March 1998.

In June 1999, the Bangladesh Nationalist Party and other opposition parties again began to abstain from attending Parliament. Opposition parties staged an increasing number of nationwide general strikes, rising from six days of general strikes in 1997 to 27 days in 1999. A four-party opposition alliance formed at the beginning of 1999 announced that it would boycott parliamentary by-elections and local government elections unless the government took steps demanded by the opposition to ensure electoral fairness. The government did not take these steps, and the opposition subsequently boycotted all elections, including municipal council elections in February 1999, several parliamentary by-elections, and the Chittagong city corporation elections in January 2000.

== Administrative division ==
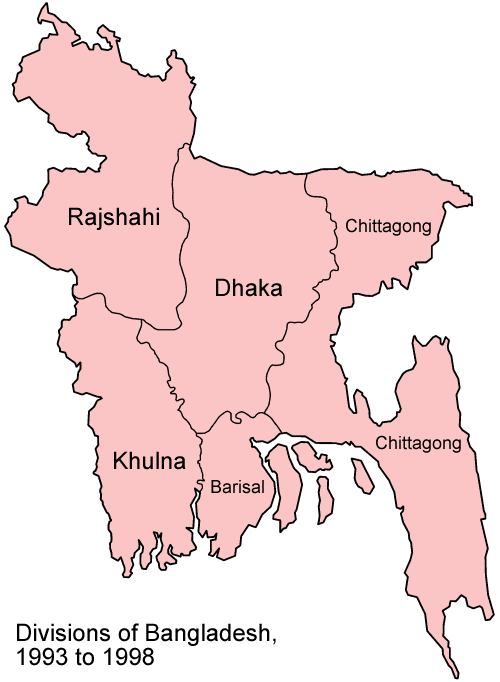

In 1990, Bangladesh was administratively divided into 4 divisions, namely Dhaka, Chittagong, Khulna, and Rajshahi, which were further subdivided into a total of 64 districts (see List of districts of Bangladesh). The government of Begum Khaleda Zia chose to change the upazila system and set up instead democratically designed decentralised structures at the appropriate levels. In 1993, Barisal Division was split off from Khulna Division, and in 1995, Sylhet Division was split off from Chittagong Division. By the end of the decade, the number of divisions stood at 6.

== Demographics ==
Based on World Development Indicators published by the World Bank, the population of Bangladesh grew from 104 million at the beginning of the decade to 129 million by the end. This signifies an annual population growth rate of 2.2%. Population density increased from 796 to 991 per km^{2}.

The urban population was 19.8% of the total at the beginning, which ended up at 23.2%. Dhaka, the largest city, with a population of 6.6 million, accounted for 31.5% of the total urban population by 1999. United Nations World Population Prospects show that the population growth rate was in a decreasing trend (from 2.5% per annum to 2.0%), primarily due to a reduction in the fertility rate (births per woman) from 4.5 to 3.3. Life expectancy at birth increased from 58.4 years to 64.7 years, with child (0–5) mortality reducing from 144 per 1,000 births to 92. The age dependency ratio (% of the working-age population) changed from 83.3% to 70.7% by the end of the decade.

== Climate ==
=== Temperature and precipitation ===
Climate data for Bangladesh in 1990s
Month	Jan	Feb	Mar	Apr	May	Jun	Jul	Aug	Sep	Oct	Nov	Dec	Year
Daily mean °C (°F)	18.3 (64.9)	20.9 (69.6)	25.1 (77.2)	27.5 (81.5)	28.1 (82.6)	28.3 (82.9)	28.1 (82.6)	28.1 (82.6)	27.9 (82.2)	26.8 (80.2)	23.5 (74.3)	19.3 (66.7)	25.2 (77.4)
Average precipitation mm (inches)	9.1 (0.36)	30.6 (1.20)	58.2 (2.29)	145.6 (5.73)	267.2 (10.52)	419.3 (16.51)	521.4 (20.53)	424.1 (16.70)	332.6 (13.09)	168.5 (6.63)	37.6 (1.48)	8.7 (0.34)	2,422.9 (95.38)
Source: Climatic Research Unit (CRU) of University of East Anglia (UEA)

Compared to the prior decade, the average December temperature decreased by about 0.6 degrees, but moderate increases in other months offset the overall annual impact. Average rainfall decreased for April, May, and July, leading to an overall average annual rainfall decrease of about 70 mm.

=== Natural disasters ===
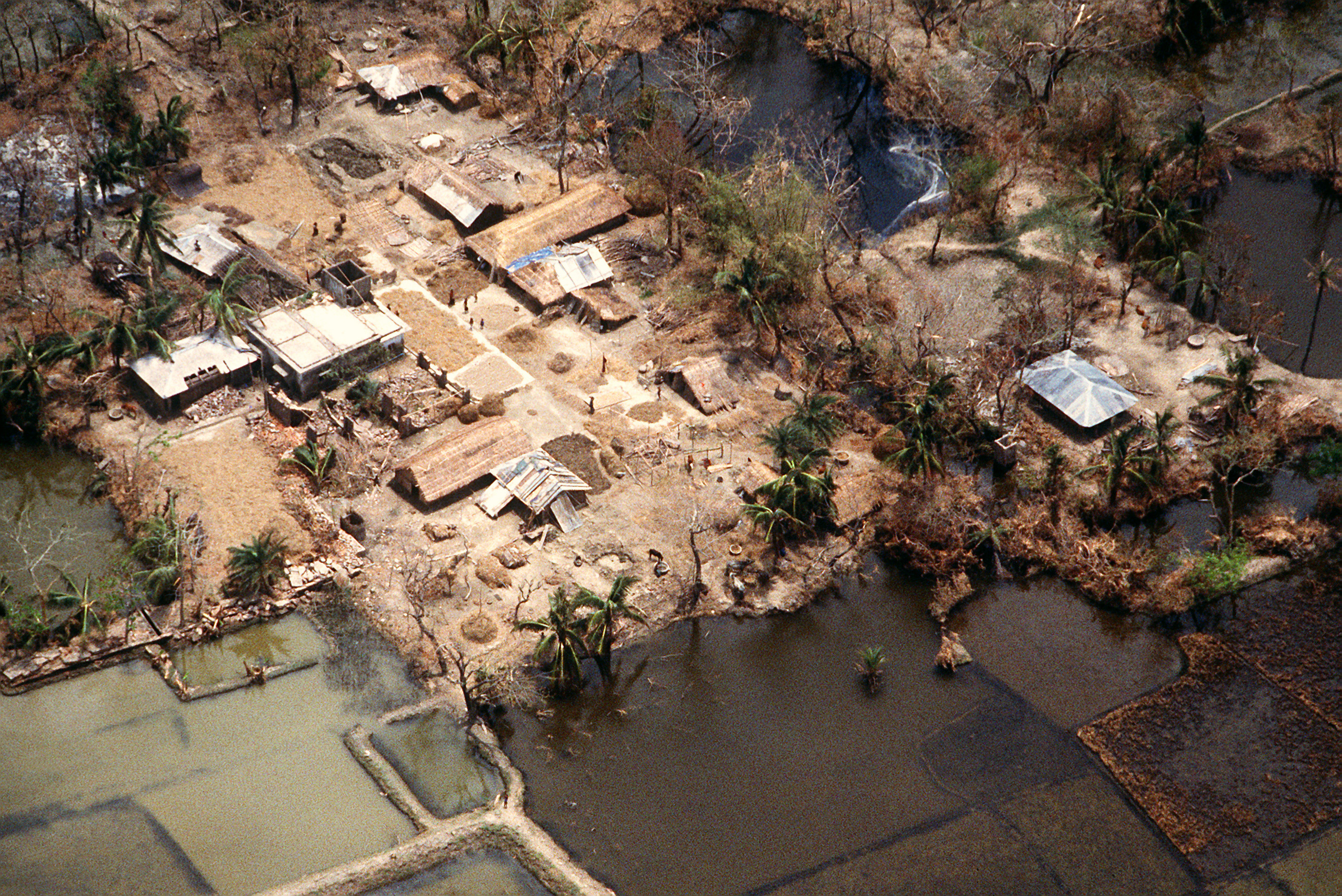
A damaged village in Bangladesh, surrounded by flooded fields, three weeks after the storm had struck

The severe cyclone of 1991 and the devastating floods of 1998 marks this decade as one of the worst hit by natural disasters after independence.

The 1991 Bangladesh cyclone was among the deadliest tropical cyclones on record. On the night of 29 April 1991, it struck the Chittagong district of southeastern Bangladesh with winds of around 250 km/h (155 mph). The storm forced a 6-metre (20 ft) storm surge inland over a wide area, killing at least 138,866 people and leaving as many as 10 million homeless. Later in the decade, in 1994, another cyclone with a velocity of 210 kilometres (130 mi) per hour struck the coastal area of Cox's Bazar, causing extensive damage to the districts of Cox's Bazar and Bandarban. As a result of the early warning and subsequent evacuation of about 450,000 people, the loss of life was minimal. According to official estimates, 133 (including 84 refugees) died and 3,559 were injured.

From July to September 1998, Bangladesh suffered extensive flooding. Over 75% of the total area of the country, including half of Dhaka, was flooded. It was similar to the catastrophic flood of 1988 in terms of the extent of the flooding. 30 million people were made homeless, and the death toll reached over a thousand. The flooding caused contamination of crops and animals, and unclean water resulted in cholera and typhoid outbreaks. About 700,000 hectares of crops were destroyed,

== Economy ==
=== National income and balance of payment ===
Bangladesh's GDP was US$42.4 billion in 1990, which grew to US$63.6 billion in 1999 (in 2010 constant dollar), signifying a 4.1% annual growth. The agricultural sector contributed to 32.8% of GDP in the beginning of the decade, which decreased to 23.8% by the end. During the same period, contribution from the industrial sector increased from 20.7% to 23.5%, and that of the service sector increased from 46.6% to 52.7%. Per capita GDP increased from US$399 to US$493 (in 2010 constant dollars).

According to World Development Indicators published by the World Bank, on a 2010 constant dollar basis, Bangladesh used to export US$1.3 billion (5.9% of GDP) worth of goods and services as of 1990, which grew at an annual average rate of 10.2% to US$3.5 billion (11.8% of GDP) in 1999. During the same time, the import of goods and services grew from US$3.1 billion (13.1% of GDP) to US$5.8 billion (16.6% of GDP). Over the decade, foreign direct investment and personal remittances receipt averaged 0.12% and 3.02% of GDP; while total reserves averaged 13.3% of external debt and 3.8 months's coverage of imports.

Gross National Income (at 2010 constant dollar) grew from US$43.3 billion to US$65.7 billion over the decade. At the beginning of this period External Debt stock (of which concessional debt was 90.6%) was 38.1% of gross national income (GNI) and external debt service burden was 2.3% of GNI. By the end of the decade, external debt stock (of which concessional debt now was 95.1%) stood at 31.1% of GNI and external debt service burden was 1.3% of the same. During the same period, military expenditure increased from 1.2% to 1.5% of GNI.

=== Agriculture ===
Aggregate value addition from the agricultural sector was US$9.7 billion in 1990 (in 2010 constant USD), which grew at an average annual rate of 2.2% to US$12.1 billion by 1999 (in the same constant USD). During this decade, crop production grew at an annual average rate of 2.5% driven by cereal production increase from 27.7 million metric tons to 36.4 million (implying annual growth of 2.8%) - enabled by improvement in cereal yield from 2490.6 kg per hectare to 3116.4 kg. At the same time livestock production grew at 3.5% per annum and fisheries production increased at annual rate of 6.3%. Altogether these contributed to overall food production increase by annualized rate of 2.7%.

=== Industrial and service sectors ===
Net value addition from industrial sector, which stood at US$7.1 billion in 1990 (in 2010 constant USD), grew at average annual rate of 6.4% to US$13.2 billion by 1999 (in the same constant USD basis). Manufacturing sector contributed 64.9% of industrial value added in the beginning of this period and it gradually changed to 65.3% by the end. There were 4,094 recorded industrial design applications by Bangladeshi residents in this decade, more than three times that from earlier decade. In 1989-90 there were 24,283 industrial establishments in the country employing 1.08 million staffs. By 1999-2000 the number of establishments grew to 24,752 and employment in the sector grew to 2.26 million.

On the other hand, net value addition from the service sector amounting US$23.6 billion in 1990, also grew at average annual rate of 3.7% and stood at US$34.0 billion by 1999 (in 2010 constant USD). Major Businesses / enterprises that started journey in this decade in Bangladesh include Eskayef and Nassa Group in 1990, Confidence Group in 1991, Renata in 1993, Banglalink and Kazi Farms in 1996, Grameenphone and Robi in 1997 and Incepta in 1999.

== Infrastructure ==
=== Transportation ===
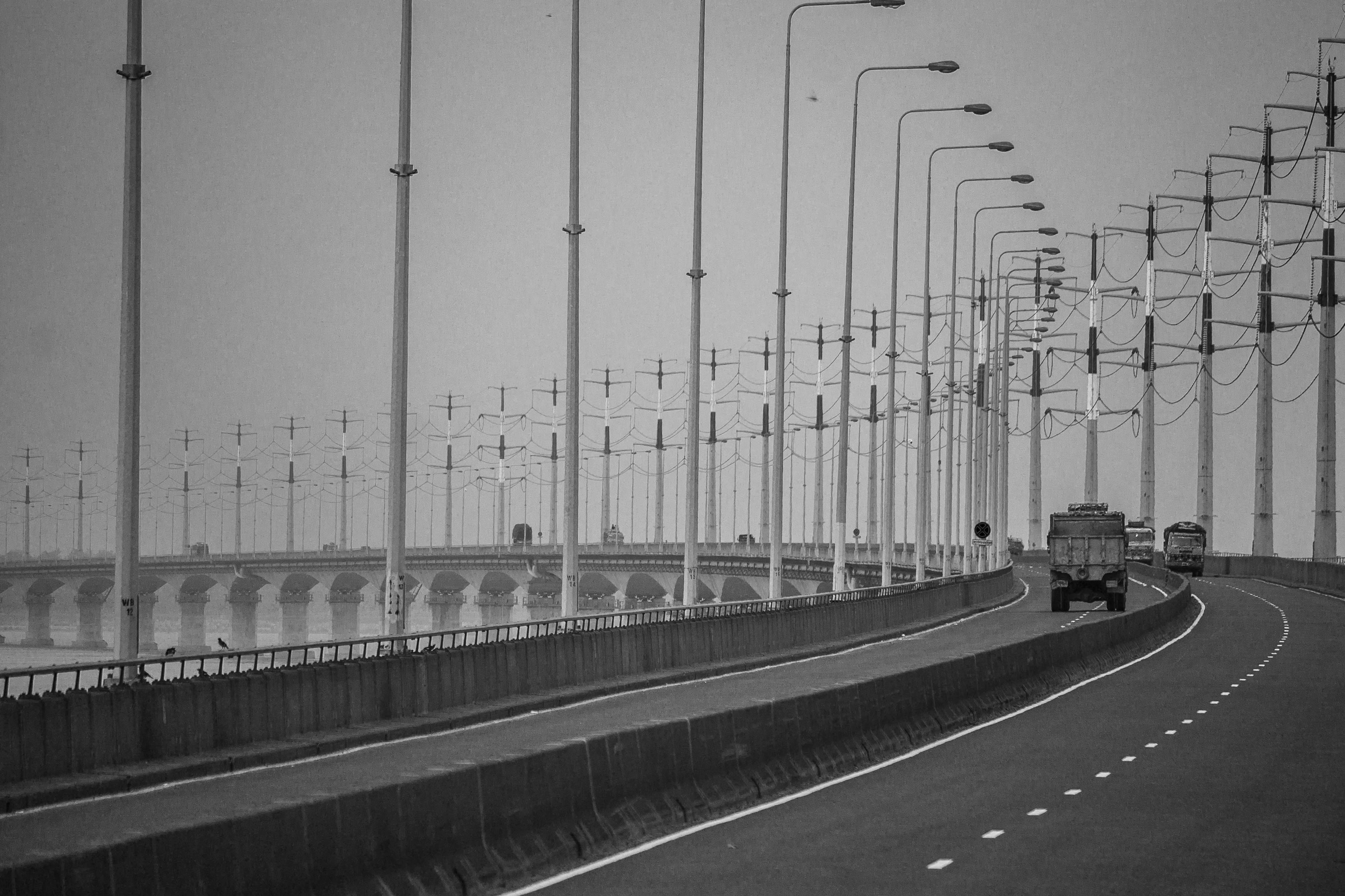
Bangabandhu Jamuna Multipurpose Bridge was opened for public use in 1998.

The road transport sector experienced rapid changes in the 1990s. Town services as well as inter-city bus transport and private taxicab services significantly improved through introduction of many large bodied modern buses. There were only 133,253 motor vehicles in Bangladesh in 1985 and the number rose to 405,919 in 1999. The construction of Bangabandhu Jamuna Bridge was completed in the second half of the 1990s and the bridge was opened to traffic in 1998. Other important bridges constructed in the 1990s included the Dhalla bridge, the 4th Bangladesh-China Friendship bridge, the Langalbanda bridge and the second Buriganga bridge that linked the national highways and contributed to substantial increase in road traffic. Although the railway network benefited from the increased connectivity from Jamuna Bridge, the sector continued to lose share. The share of the railway sector in passenger traffic declined from 50% in the 1960s to 12% in 1990s and in freight traffic over the same period from 40% to 7%. Due to small volume of traffic and resulting low profitability Faridpur-Pukuria, Bheramara-Raita, Feni-Belonia, and Rupsa-Bagerhat sections of the railway line were closed between 1994 and 1997. Air Transport sector also did not grow much in this decade. As of 1989, there were 14,600 registered carrier departures worldwide which came down to 5,900 by 1999. During the same period number of passenger carried slightly increased from 1.00 million to about 1.22 million per annum.

=== Telecommunication ===
In 1995 Regulatory power of BTTB was transferred to Ministry (MoPT) and the same year the 2nd and 3rd ITX were installed in Dhaka. The monopoly of Pacific Bangladesh Telephone Limited in cellular telephone services came to an end with the grant of license to GrameenPhone and Telecom Malaysia International Bangladesh in 1996. In 1998, the country got its first Telecom Policy.

In the beginning of the decade there were 218,000 fixed telephone line subscription in the country - which increased to 432,968 by the end signifying 0.34 lines per 100 people. By 1999 there were also 149,000 mobile cellular subscriptions signifying 0.12 lines per 100 people.

=== Energy ===
In the beginning of the decade a severe supply-demand imbalance led the Bangladesh Government to implement a private sector power programme. In October 1997, the Bangladesh Power Development Board signed a power purchase agreement (PPA) with Wärtsilä NSD Power Development for a 110 MW barge-mounted power plant at Khulna. The plant entered commercial operation after a year. The process of acquiring another 360 MW plant at Haripur was also in motion, at that time, but it became operational in Oct 2001.

In 1990 to reduce the administrative burden of BPDB, the Government transferred the 132 kv, 33 kv Transmission and distribution system in the Greater Dhaka Area including the Metropolitan City to a newly created Government agency called the Dhaka Electric Supply Authority (DESA). In 1996, DESA was registered as a Public Limited company and was renamed DESCO.

In 1990 per capital electric power consumption was 48.4 kWh, which increased to 94.3 kWh by 1999. During the same period per capita energy usage increased from 120.0 kg of oil equivalent to 136.8 kg and fossil fuel energy consumption increased from 45.5% to 57.3% of total.

In 1990 the electricity produced in the country was coming from: hydroelectric sources: 11.4%, natural gas sources: 84.3% and oil sources: 4.3%. By 1999 the distribution changed to - hydroelectric sources: 5.8%, natural gas sources: 85.0% and oil sources: 9.3%.

=== Financial services ===
After addressing the loan recovery issue in the banking sector in the 1980s (see here), from 1990, the Government pursued broader Financial Sector Reform Programs. These reforms include flexible interest rate, convertibility of "Taka", introduction of 91 days bill, recapitalization of banks, new procedure for loan classification, and strengthening the money and capital market. This helped improve capital adequacy, governance, regulation, supervision and payment system in the economy. New banks starting operations in this decade were: Eastern Bank in 1992, National Credit and Commerce Bank in 1993, Prime Bank, South-east Bank, Dhaka Bank, Al-Arafah Islami Bank and Social Investment Bank in 1995, Premier Bank and Dutch-Bangla Bank in 1996, Mercantile Bank, Standard Bank, One Bank, ExIm Bank, Bangladesh Commerce Bank, Mutual Trust Bank, Trust Bank, Bank Asia and First Security Bank in 1999.

The insurance sector underwent reforms as well. The Insurance Corporations (Amendment) Act 1990 allowed private sector insurance companies to underwrite 50% of the insurance business emanating from the public sector and to place up to 50% of their reinsurance with any reinsurer of their choice, at home or abroad, keeping the remaining for placement with the Sadharan Bima Corporation.

Meanwhile, a new Stock Exchange was established in Chittagong in 1995 to facilitate Capital market in the port city. The regulatory environment was inadequate and market regulations were outdated and not systematically enforced. In this milieu of weak institutional structure and inadequate governance, the capital market experienced its first speculative bubble and burst in 1996–1997. Investors who were affected due to the bubble and burst stayed away from the market for the next several years.

=== Education ===
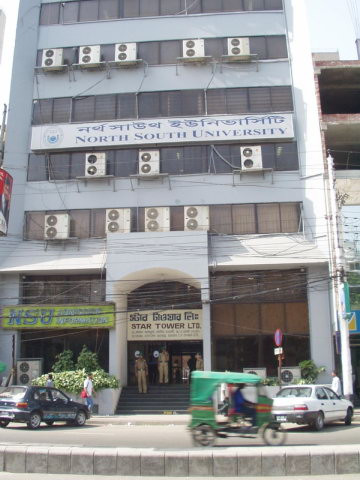
Most early private universities started their operation in small scale in the 1990s. The image shows old campus of North South University.

The establishment of democratic regime had its mark on the education sector as well. In the beginning of the decade many public schools were made double shift, new teaching posts were created, Female students' stipend programme was introduced, government subsidy in monthly pay order (MPO) was increased and a new assessment system at SSC examination was introduced. During mid 1990s, the secondary school curriculum was updated, about 150,000 teachers received short-term training in the new curriculum and teacher training institutes experienced a major uplift. At the end of 1990s, 'Shamsul Haque Education Commission 1997' was formed.

In the beginning of the decade about 3.5 million primary-school-age children remained outside school, but this number continued to decline. Based on World Bank data, in 1990, there were 3.59 million secondary school students (including higher secondary) in the country, which significantly grew to 9.91 million by the end of the decade. Secondary school enrollment rate drastically improved from 20.4% to 46.6% during the same period. Thanks to the new initiatives, over these years ratio of female students in secondary education increased from 33.0% to 49.0% and the number of teachers covering the students grew from 131 to 265 thousand.

The secondary and higher secondary education administration for the country, used to be managed by 4 general education boards, namely Dhaka, Rajshahi, Comilla and Jessore; a Technical Education Board and a Madrasah Education Board. To strengthen and expand the supervision of Secondary and Higher Secondary Education Examinations, Chittagong Board was set up in 1995, and then two additional education boards, Barisal and Sylhet were set up in 1999.

In the early 1990s the tertiary education in the country was fully managed in the public sector. Five general purpose universities (DU, RU, CU, JU and IU) along with 4 specialized universities - BUET, BAU and newly opened IUT and SUST catered for the need of higher education in the country. The Khulna University (KU) formally inaugurated academic activities on 25 November 1991. Bangladesh Open University and National University of Bangladesh were established in 1992 to further the causes of distant learning. Three other public sector specialized universities, namely Bangabandhu Sheikh Mujibur Rahman Agricultural University (BSMRAU), Hajee Mohammad Danesh Science & Technology University (HSTU) and Mawlana Bhashani Science and Technology University (MBSTU) were established by the end of the decade. Furthermore, Institute of Postgraduate Medicine and Research (IPGMR) - the authoritative body in medical education in the country - was renamed as Bangabandhu Sheikh Mujib Medical University (BSMMU) by the Act 1, 1998 of Jatiyo Sangshad.

Perhaps the most transformative change in the tertiary education sector in this decade was opening up to the private sector. Establishment of private universities in Bangladesh was initiated after the institution of the Private University Act 1992 and by the end of the decade, at least 17 private universities had started their operations, including IUBAT, NSU, USTC, CWU, IUB, AIUB, AUST, DIU, IIUC, AUB and EWU. However, most of these universities started their operation in limited scale at rented premises which drew considerable criticism regarding the quality of higher education in private sector.

=== Mass media ===
With the return of a democratically elected government in 1991, the freedom of press situation of the country improved. The interim government relaxed some of the restrictions on the press imposed in the earlier decade. Later, the Khaleda Zia and Sheikh Hasina governments did not fulfill their 'Three-Alliance Framework' to repeal or amend the regulations which infringed on freedom of the press. Several influential national dailies started their circulation in this decade, including Ajker Kagoj in 1990, The Daily Star in 1991; Bhorer Kagoj in 1992, Janakantha in 1993, The Independent in 1995, and Manab Zamin and Prothom Alo in 1998. By the end of the decade, the new entrants outnumbered the old market leaders both in terms of influence in shaping public opinion and market circulation.

Bangladesh Television, the only state-owned Television network in the country, started broadcasting private production in 1994. In 1995 the government allowed international satellite channels to be televised commercially. On 15 July 1997, the first Bangla private satellite channel ATN Bangla started operation and it was followed by Channel i in 1999. The state-owned Radio Bangladesh was renamed back to Bangladesh Betar in 1996 and it continued to operate as the only radio network in the country.

== Awards and recognitions ==
- Gonoshasthaya Kendra / Zafrullah Chowdhury was awarded the Right Livelihood Award in 1992.
- Dr. Muhammad Yunus won the World Food Prize in 1994.
- Angela Gomes, the Founder and executive director of the non-profit organization Banchte Shekha, was awarded Ramon Magsaysay Award in 1999.

== Culture ==
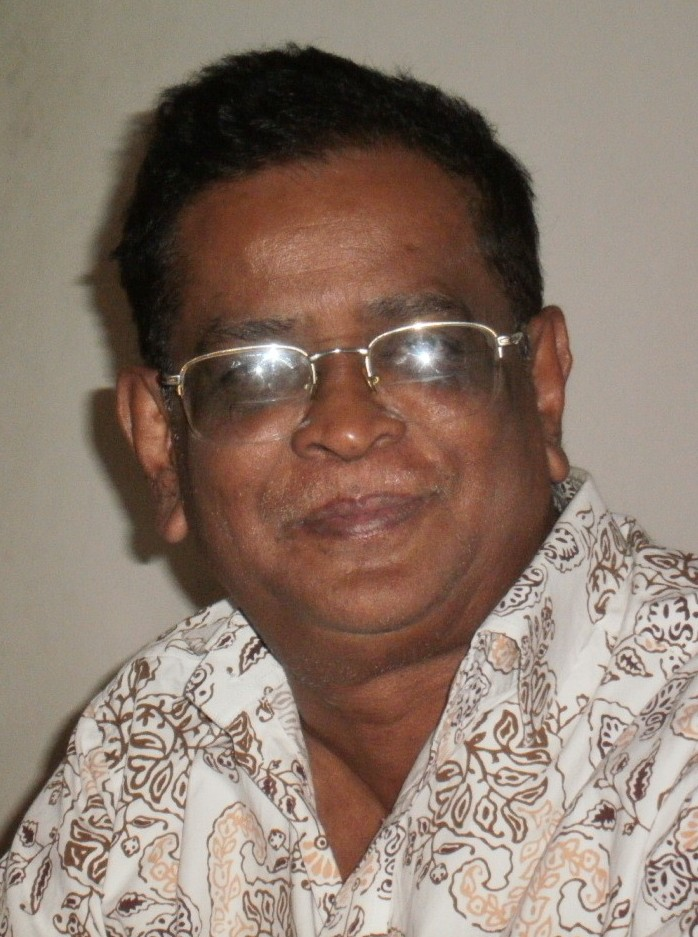
In the '90s Humayun Ahmed consolidated his position as the most popular author of novels and TV serials in the country

=== Literature ===
In the 1990s the literary scene of the country flourished under democratic environment. In this decade Humayun Ahmed consolidated his position as the most popular author in the country as his books consistently became the highest seller in Ekushey Book Fair. Notable literary works produced by the authors of Bangladesh in this decade include: Imdadul Haq Milan's Jabojjibon, Rajaktontro, Bhalobashar Shukh Dukh; Humayun Ahmed's Moyurakshmi introducing his famous creation - the fictional character "Himu", Bohubrihi, Gauripur Junction, Kothao Keu Nei, Anil Bagchir Ekdin, 1971, Chander Aloe Koyekjon Jubok, Kobi, Opekshma and Rumali; Bipradash Barua's Samudracar O Bidrohira, Bashir Al Helal's Shishirer Deshe Avijan; Rudra Mohammad Shahidullah's poetry Moulik Mukhosh; Syed Shamsul Haq's Khelaram Khele Ja; Muhammad Yunus' autobiographical Banker to the Poor; Nilima Ibrahim's Bindu-Visarga, Ami Virangana Bolchhi; Humayun Azad's Naree, Shreshtho Kobita, Chappanno Hazar Borgomile, Kabya Shonggroho; Moinul Ahsan Saber's Opeksha, Kobej Lethel; Taslima Nasrin's controversial and later banned novel Lajja; Ahmed Sofa's Alat Chakra, Gabhi Bittanto, Ardhek Nari Ardhek Ishvari, Pushpa Briksha ebang Bihanga Puran and Joddopi amar guru; Muhammed Zafar Iqbal's Amar Bondhu Rashed; Rabeya Khatun's Ei birohokal and Ei Bhora Bador Mah Bhador; Hasant Abdul Hye's Novera; Anisul Hoque's Ondhokarer Eksho Bochhor, Kheya, Fand, Amar Ekta Dukhkho Achhe and Bristibondhu; Nirmalendu Goon's poetry Priẏa nārī hārāno kabitā and Nāma diẏechi bhālobāsa; and Mokbula Manzoor's Kaler Mandira. The death of poet Rudra Mohammad Shahidullah in 1991, at the young age of 35, shocked the nation. In this decade the literature circle of the country also lost luminaries like: Akhteruzzaman Elias (1997), novelist Shawkat Osman (1998), educationist Abdullah-Al-Muti (1998) and poet Sufia Kamal (1999).

=== Visual arts ===
Photographers like Manzoor Alam Beg, Anwar Hossain, Hasan Saifuddin Chandan and Shahidul Alam continued to dominate the photography field. Shahidul, who set up the Drik Picture Library in 1989, went on to set up the Pathshala South Asian Media Institute in Dhaka in 1998 and the Chobi Mela International Photography Festival in 1999. The paintings field was also quite vibrant. While in the 80s the painters experimented with different mediums, it was from the 90s that new thinking started to have widespread influence in Bangladeshi art. In addition to installation or building work, artists began to complement their work with videography, performance, site-specific art etc. New contributors in painting and painting-related mixed techniques in this decade include Abdus Shakur Shah, Kanak Chanpa Chakma, Mahbubur Rahman, Tayeba Begum Lipi, Ashok Karmakar. Among the veterans artist Shahabuddin Ahmed and painter cartoonist Rafiqun Nabi continued to make active contributions. However, in this decade the death of master painter SM Sultan (1994) made the nation grieve. For Bangladeshi architecture, the 1990s was a transformative decade. Due to rapid urbanization since late 80s and wealth accumulation, architects began to find abundant work opportunities from the mid-1990s. Until the early 1990s design consultancy was limited to a small number of architectural firms. But under the changing landscape new, smaller firms, run by younger architects, began to reshape the traditional methods of architectural design practice in the country.

=== Performing arts ===
In this decade music directors and composers like Khandaker Nurul Alam, Alam Khan, Azad Rahman, Satya Saha, Khan Ataur Rahman and Maksud Jamil Mintu and singers like Sabina Yasmin, Runa Laila, Andrew Kishore, Subir Nandi, Syed Abdul Hadi, Farida Parveen, Khalid Hasan Milu, Saidur Rahman Boyati, Kanak Chapa and Kiran Chandra Roy led the music arena with modern Bengali music and playback music of films. Singers like Tapan Chowdhury, Shakila Zafar, Shuvro Dev, Samina Chowdhury, Fahmida Nabi and Agun cemented their places as rising stars of modern Bengali songs. Bands from the 1980s, including Souls, Feedback, Feelings (later renamed Nagar Baul) and Miles, continued their success along with the new bands of the 1990s. 1990s is sometimes considered the most productive phase in Bangladeshi music history. From the 1990s, it became common to divide mainstream rock into pop and hard rock. Pop rock got more popularity than the previous decades through bands like Souls and Feedback, whose frontman Maqsoodul Haque established the Bangladesh Musical Bands Association (BAMBA) in 1987. Throughout the 90s BAMBA organized numerous successful concerts that helped many bands with their career, including Ark, Different Touch and Winning. In contrast, hard rock was more influenced by the 1960s psychedelic rock, blues rock and the 1970s Bangladeshi rock artists. The most successful and influential band from the psychedelic rock was Nova. The most successful band from the blues rock genre was LRB, who went on to release several best-selling albums in the decade. Ayub Bachchu, the vocalist and electric guitarist of the band, is considered to be the greatest guitarist of Bangladesh. Rockstrata, Waves and Warfaze were other notable rock bands from this decade.

The leading theatre groups remained active despite falling popularity of the medium. Notebale among these in Dhaka city were Theatre, Nagarik Natya Sampraday, Natyachakra, Aranyak Natyadal, Dhaka Theatre and, in Chittagong, Theatre '73, Tirjak Nattyagoshthi and Arindam. Mamunur Rashid's Joyjointi staged by Aaronyk and Mannan Hira's Ekattorer Khudiram performed by Shomoi Shangskritik Goshthi were among notable plays on the theme of liberation war. Other notable productions included Chaka by Selim Al Deen (produced by Dhaka Theatre), adaptation of bisad-sindhu by mir mosharraf hossain (produced by Dhaka Padatik), Shes Sanglap by the Egyptian playwright Tawfiq al-Hakim (produced by Ganayana), Meraj Fakirer Ma by Abdullah al-Mamun (produced by Theatre), Irsa by Syed Shamsul Huq (produced by Nagarik), Kamalaranir Sagar Dighi (produced by the Department of Theatre and Music, University of Dhaka), an adaptation of Arthur Miller's The Crucible (produced by Natyakendra) and Nitya Purana by Masum Reza (produced by Desh Natak).

=== Cinema ===
In the 1990s most of the Bangladeshi movies were dominated by mainstream commercial movies. There were many successful films produced in this time. In 1990s, definition of Bangla mainstream commercial movies had changed, because most of the movies were very much influenced by commercial Indian Hindi movies and most of them were direct copies from those Indian commercial Hindi films full with action, dance, song and jokes. In the 1990s some new directors and actors came to the industry. Acclaimed directors such as Tanvir Mokammel, Tareque Masud, Morshedul Islam, Humayun Ahmed, Nasiruddin Yousuff, Akhtaruzzaman and Mustafizur Rahman made some critically and internationally acclaimed films at that time. Highly acclaimed documentary film Muktir Gaan by Tareque Masud ‍and Catherine Masud explored the impact of cultural identity on the Bangladesh Liberation War in 1971, where music and song provided a source of inspiration to the freedom fighters and a spiritual bond for the whole emerging nation.

The 1990s marked the debut and dominance of Salman Shah who is referred as the "Prince of Bangladeshi Cinema" and the "First Superstar of Modern Dhallywood". Regarded as one of the most popular and influential actors in the history of Bangladeshi cinema, he starred in some of the most successful films in Dhallywood's history which include Ontare Ontare, Ei Ghor Ei Songsar, Sujan Sakhi, Mayer Odhikar and Anondo Osru. Additionally three of his films, Shopner Thikana, Sotter Mrittu Nei and Keyamat Theke Keyamat are among the top ten highest-grossing films of all time in the Dhallywood box office. His untimely death at the height of his fame in 1996, is noted to be a tragic event for the nation which evoked unanimous public reactions of grief and brought the film industry to a standstill.

Among other successful male actors during this time were Alamgir, Jashim, Ilias Kanchan, Nayeem, Manna, Riaz and Omar Sani. Among successful female actors were Shabana, Champa, Dolly Johur, Suchorita, Shabnaz. Some notable films from this decade include Padma Nadir Majhi by Indian director Goutam Ghose, Padma Meghna Jamuna by Chashi Nazrul Islam, Pita Mata Sontan and Banglar Bodhu by A. J. Mintu, Aguner Poroshmoni and Srabon Megher Din by Humayun Ahmed, Desh Premik by Kazi Hayat, Anya Jibon by Sheikh Niamat Ali, Poka Makorer Ghor Bosoti by Akhtaruzzaman, Dukhai by Morshedul Islam, Hothat Brishti by Indian director Basu Chatterjee and Chitra Nodir Pare by Tanvir Mokammel.

=== Television ===
The 1990s was a transformative decade for the TV audience in Bangladesh, as both international and local commercial channels became available. The decade began with Bangladesh Television (BTV) as the only available television network in the country. However, in 1992, the government opened up satellite transmission to allow news channels like CNN and BBC to start broadcasting in Bangladesh. This was followed by the introduction of other commercial channels shortly after. Private satellite TV channels of Bangladeshi origin also started transmission during this time.

Drama serials and stand-alone drama production remained popular form of television entertainment. Humayun Ahmed's Ayomoy and Kothao Keu Nei and a drama serial based on Shahidullah Kaiser's Songsoptok gained popularity among the viewers. Nawazish Ali Khan, Abdullah al Mamun and Atiqul Haque Chowdhury were among the leading drama producers. Thanks to the popular drama productions in BTV and other private TV channels, television actors like Humayun Faridi, Afzal Hossain, Asaduzzaman Nur, Abul Hayat, Aly Zaker, Zahid Hasan, Taukir Ahmed, Azizul Hakim, Suborna Mustafa, Bipasha Hayat, Shomi Kayser, Sara Zaker and Afsana Mimi, among others, became household names.

Besides drama programs magazine programs like Hanif Sanket's "Ittyadi", children's program like "Notun Kuri" and "Esho Gan Shikhi" and informational programs like Mati O Manush were popular with the Bangladeshi audience. In addition to its own program BTV continued to air several foreign television series, such as MacGyver, "Hercules: The Legendary Journeys", Alif Laila, Dark Justice, Girl from Tomorrow, Captain Planet and the Planeteers, RoboCop, The X-Files, The Sword of Tipu Sultan etc. - which were popular with Bangladeshi TV audience.

=== Sports ===
The 1990s was a decade of breakthrough and transition for Bangladesh sports. The country's most significant achievement was in cricket, in which the country became an associate member of ICC in 1997 and a full member in 2000. Bangladesh took part in 1990 and 1994 editions of the ICC Trophy, and won the trophy in 1997, in the process qualified for the 1999 World Cup. Bangladesh also took part in the 1990 Austral-Asia Cup, the Asia Cup in 1990–91, 1995, 1997, and several other triangular tournaments, but it was not until 1998 that they won their first ODI. Their 22-match losing streak since their first ODI was at the time a record. Bangladesh played in its first World Cup in England in 1999 and recorded their first win in a World Cup match against Scotland. Later Bangladesh created an enormous upset by beating Pakistan by 62 runs in the group match at Northampton.

Bangladesh also saw some success in football in this decade. In 1995 Bangladesh won the 4-nation Tiger Trophy in Myanmar, which was the nation's very first major trophy. The year 1996 saw Bangladesh being ranked 110 by FIFA, however, they failed to add to their success, finishing runner-up at the 1995 South Asian Games and 1999 SAFF Gold Cup. It was at the 1999 South Asian Games where the Bangladesh team ended their 19-year wait for a gold medal, defeating hosts Nepal in the final. Another sport that made history was Shooting, in which Bangladesh won gold medals in Commonwealth Games in 1990 and South Asian Games in 1999. Football remained popular but faced decline due to lack of funding and infrastructure. Field hockey also lost its appeal after poor performance in international tournaments.

== See also ==
Years in Bangladesh in the decade of

1990s
1990
1991
1992
1993
1994
1995
1996
1997
1998
1999
