= 1993 in Bangladesh =

- Centuries: 20th; 21st
- Decades: 1970s; 1980s; 1990s; 2000s; 2010s
- See also: Other events of 1993; List of years in Bangladesh

1993 (MCMXCIII) was a common year starting on Friday of the Gregorian calendar, the 1993rd year of the Common Era (CE) and Anno Domini (AD) designations, the 993rd year of the 2nd millennium, the 93rd year of the 20th century, and the 4th year of the 1990s decade.

The year 1993 was the 22nd year after the independence of Bangladesh. It was the third year of the first term of the government of Khaleda Zia.

== Events ==
- 15 July - 4 are dead after being drowned in Daudkandi.

== Incumbents ==
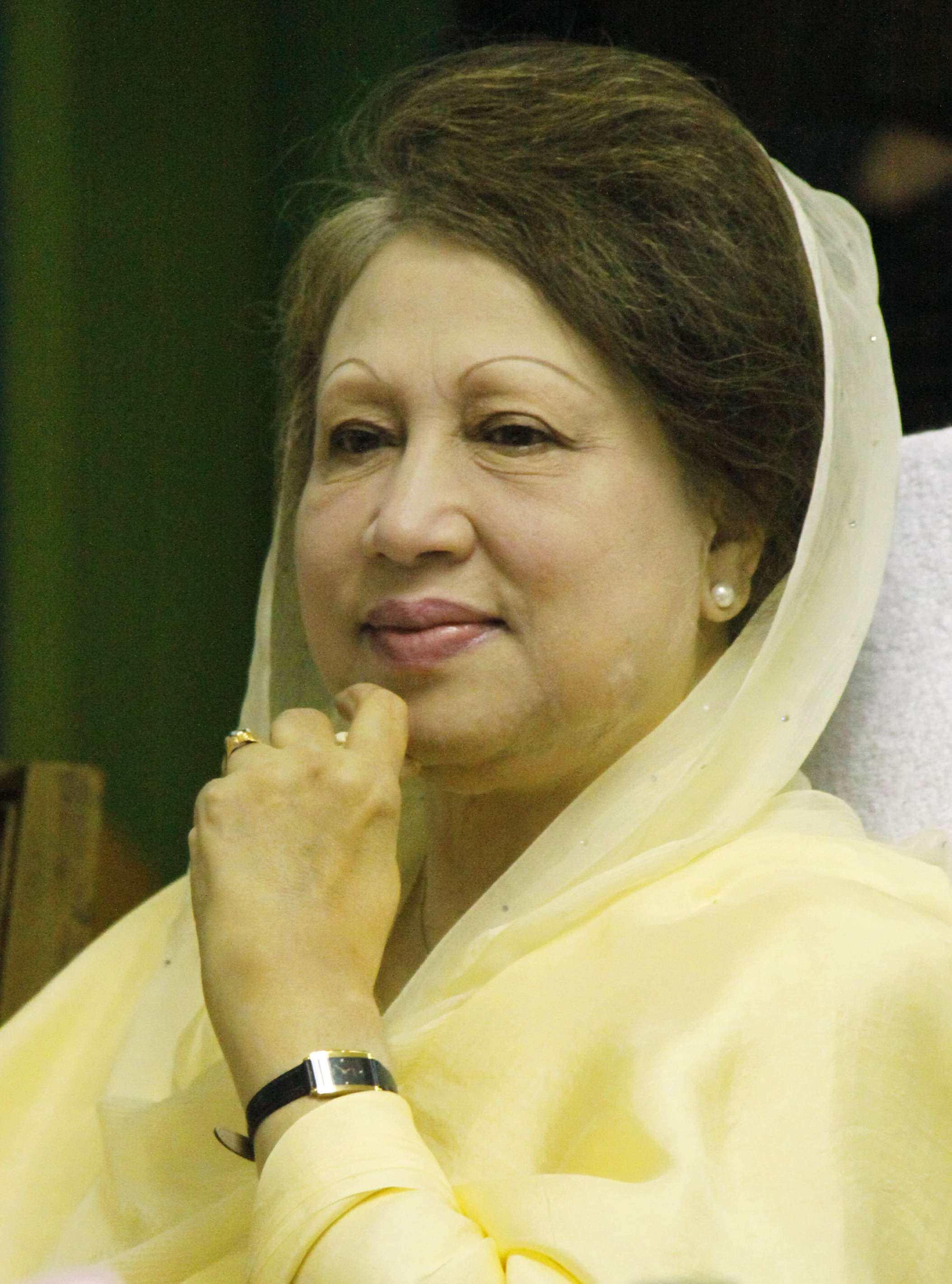
Khaleda
Zia

- President: Abdur Rahman Biswas
- Prime Minister: Khaleda Zia
- Chief Justice: Shahabuddin Ahmed

== Demography ==
Demographic Indicators for Bangladesh in 1993
Population, total	110,350,641
Population density (per km^{2})	847.7
Population growth (annual %)	2.2%
Male to Female Ratio (every 100 Female)	106.3
Urban population (% of total)	21.0%
Birth rate, crude (per 1,000 people)	32.5
Death rate, crude (per 1,000 people)	9.1
Mortality rate, under 5 (per 1,000 live births)	126
Life expectancy at birth, total (years)	60.4
Fertility rate, total (births per woman)	4.0

== Climate ==
Climate data for Bangladesh in 1993
Month	Jan	Feb	Mar	Apr	May	Jun	Jul	Aug	Sep	Oct	Nov	Dec	Year
Daily mean °C (°F)	18.0 (64.4)	21.1 (70.0)	23.5 (74.3)	26.4 (79.5)	26.9 (80.4)	27.7 (81.9)	28.0 (82.4)	27.8 (82.0)	27.5 (81.5)	26.7 (80.1)	23.3 (73.9)	19.9 (67.8)	24.7 (76.5)
Average precipitation mm (inches)	15.6 (0.61)	48.9 (1.93)	92.7 (3.65)	120.1 (4.73)	450.7 (17.74)	499.8 (19.68)	470.9 (18.54)	458. (18.0)	351.6 (13.84)	135.3 (5.33)	16.9 (0.67)	0 (0)	2,660.5 (104.74)
Source: Climatic Research Unit (CRU) of University of East Anglia (UEA)

=== Flood ===
- Beginning of August 1993, heavy floods hit the district of Gaibandha District in Northern Bangladesh. Continuous rainfall followed. The flood water exceeded the highest level of the 2004 floods, affecting 47,000 households.

== Economy ==
Key Economic Indicators for Bangladesh in 1993
National Income
	Current US$	Current BDT	% of GDP
GDP	$33.2 billion	BDT1,253.7 billion	
GDP growth (annual %)	4.7%		
GDP per capita	$300.6	BDT11,361	
Agriculture, value added	$9.1 billion	BDT342.5 billion	27.3%
Industry, value added	$7.6 billion	BDT287.5 billion	22.9%
Services, etc., value added	$15.3 billion	BDT577.3 billion	46.0%
Balance of Payment
	Current US$	Current BDT	% of GDP
Current account balance	$359.3 million		1.1%
Imports of goods and services	$4,589.4 million	BDT176.8 billion	14.1%
Exports of goods and services	$3,074.1 million	BDT113.0 billion	9.0%
Foreign direct investment, net inflows	$14.0 million		0.0%
Personal remittances, received	$1,007.4 million		3.0%
Total reserves (includes gold) at year end	$2,446.6 million		
Total reserves in months of imports	6.2		

Note: For the year 1993 average official exchange rate for BDT was 39.57 per US$.

== Events ==
- 12 May – Bangladesh and Myanmar sign an MOU with UNHCR to facilitate repatriation of Rohingya refugees.
- 22 May – India and Bangladesh signed an accord to facilitate repatriation of 50,000 Chakma refugees from India to Bangladesh.
- 8 June – Securities and Exchange Commission (Bangladesh), the regulator of the capital market of Bangladesh, was established under the Securities and Exchange Commission Act, 1993.
- 20 September – Four activists of Bangladesh Islami Chhatra Shibir were killed in a gunfight with activists of Bangladesh Jatiyatabadi Chhatra Dal in Khulna.

=== Awards and Recognitions ===
==== Independence Day Award ====
Recipients	Area	Note
Qazi Abdul Alim	Sports	
Abul Kashem	Education	Posthumous
SM Sultan	Fine arts	
Jahanara Begum	Rural development	
A. Q. M. Badruddoza Chowdhury	Medical science	

==== Ekushey Padak ====
1. Moniruddin Yusuf (literature)
2. Rabeya Khatun (literature)
3. Mofazzal Haider Chaudhuri (education)
4. Riazuddin Ahmed (journalism)
5. Mohammad Asafuddowla (music)
6. Fazlul Huq (musician) (music)
7. Dilara Zaman (acting)
8. Rafiqun Nabi (fine arts)
9. Jewel Aich (magic arts)

=== Sports ===
- South Asian (Federation) Games:
  - Bangladesh hosted the 1993 South Asian Federation Games in Dhaka from 20 to 27 December. With 11 golds, 19 silvers and 32 bronzes Bangladesh ended the tournament at the fourth position in overall points table.
- Domestic football:
  - Mohammedan SC won 1993 Dhaka Premier Division League title while Abahani KC became runner-up.

== Births ==
- 25 February – Soumya Sarkar, cricketer
- 1 April – Jahanara Alam, cricketer
- 15 May – Mohammad Mahfizur Rahman, swimmer
- 25 October – Sabina Khatun, footballer
- 3 December – Wahed Ahmed, footballer

== Deaths ==
- 16 March – A. N. M. Nuruzzaman, freedom fighter (b. 1938)
- 17 October – Syed Mohammad Ali, journalist (b. 1928)
- 31 October – Fakir Abdul Mannan, politician (b. 1901)

== See also ==
- 1990s in Bangladesh
- List of Bangladeshi films of 1993
- Timeline of Bangladeshi history
