= Hasanuzzaman Khan =

Bangladeshi journalist

- হাসানউজ্জামান খান
- Born: 5 October 1926; Keraniganj, Dhaka, Bengal Presidency, British India
- Died: 18 May 2015 (aged 88); Dhaka, Bangladesh
- Resting place: Martyred Intellectuals' Graveyard, Mirpur
- Occupation: Journalist

Hasanuzzaman Khan (5 October 1926 – 18 May 2015) was a Bangladeshi journalist. He was awarded Ekushey Padak in 1994 by the Government of Bangladesh.

== Career ==
Khan worked in several newspapers - Azad, Swadhinata, Pakistan Observer, New Nation, The Bangladesh Today and Financial Express.
