= Abdul Mosabber Chowdhury =

Abdul Mosabber Chowdhury is a Bangladeshi scientist and recipient of the Independence Award, Bangladesh's highest civilian award.

== Career ==
Chowdhury was awarded the Independence Award, Bangladesh's highest civilian award, in 1998 for his contribution to science.

== Bibliography ==
- বাংলাদেশ, আমি ও উন্নত দেশসমূহ (Bangladesh, I, and Developed Countries.)
