= Bangladesh Environment Conservation Act, 1995 =

1995 Bangladesh law

Bangladesh Environment Conservation Act (BECA) is an Act of Parliament passed in 1995 to safeguard and conserve the environment. Its main goals were to "provide for conservation of the environment, improvement of environmental standards and control and mitigation of environmental pollution."

The Act gives operational definitions of many important terms, including ecosystem, pollution, waste and hazardous substance. Seven areas in Bangladesh are defined as Ecologically Critical Areas under this law. Despite the Act and its supporting laws and policies, the environmental degradation in Bangladesh continues, principally under the population pressure.

== History ==
Earlier environmental laws in Bangladesh include the Bangladesh Wildlife (Preservation) Order of 1973, the Marine Fisheries Ordinance of 1983, and the Brick Burning (Control) Act of 1989. Other major preservation laws enacted before the independence of Bangladesh include the Public Parks Act of 1904, the Agricultural and Sanitary Improvement Act of 1920, the Forest Act of 1927, and the Protection and Conservation of Fish Act of 1950.

The Act followed the establishment of the Ministry of Environment and Forest in 1989 and the National Environment Management Action Plan (NEMAP) in 1992, as well as the Forest Policy in 1994 and the Forestry Master Plan (1993–2012) in 1993.

The Act of 1995 came into effect on February 16, 1995.

== The Director General ==
Upon approving the Bangladesh Environmental Conservation Act, 1995, the government established the Department of Environment, which is to be headed by a Director General. The Director General can set up any rules and measures that he may consider will help conserve the country's environment and may improve the environment's standards. The Director General can work with other agencies that the Director General thinks can effectively aid in their goal.

The Director General can introduce rules and regulations that can help prevent accidents that can potentially damage and pollute the environment, the Director General can also direct the clean-up of any spill or major environmental disaster and issue directions to undo the damage that was done on the environment. The Director General can issue directions and rules pertaining to the use, storage, transportation, import and export of any hazardous materials. The Director General can also conduct research on conserving and improving the environment and can receive assistance from any organisation to effectively conduct the research. For example, the Director General may conduct research on the quality of drinking water and setup regulations that can improve the quality of the countries drinking water by working with the Bangladesh Water Development Board.

The Director-General can use the media and newspapers to publicize any information about how to prevent and control the country's pollution. The Director General can also advise the Government from allowing the manufacturing of certain products that can damage the country's environment, like if the commodity is made out of an endangered species pelt the Director General can advise the Government to pass a law outlawing the hunting of the hypothetical animal.

The Director General can also fine and shut down any companies that are causing significant harm to the country's environment and can heavily regulate the way companies operate, before demanding that the company shut down the Director General must first send the owner of the company a written notice and give them a time limit to respond to the notice but if the owner fails to comply by the given time then the Director General may issue the closure of the company and also the Director General can also direct the electricity, gas, telephone and water provider of the company to stop servicing them because of their inability to follow the rules and regulations. The Director General may also request the help of any law enforcement or Government authority to enforce the rules and regulations set by the Director General.

In September 2009, the four rivers around the capital city Dhaka - Buriganga River, Shitalakshya River, Turag River and Balu River - have been declared by the Department of Environment as ECAs.

== Present-day projects ==
The Bangladeshi government has started building new sidewalks with surface drains so that garbage can be drained away and won't linger in the streets any more and the new drainage system can help mitigate the country's problems with mass floodings. The Bangladeshi government has constructed air quality monitoring stations so that the government can effectively monitor the improvements of air quality in many different areas around the country. The Bangladeshi government has updated bus routes so that they can shorten the distance that the bus has to travel and in turn improve the area's air quality. The Bangladeshi government passed new Vehicular Emission Standards on 31 December 2014 which will help improve the country's overall air pollution problem.

Another law to be mentioned is the "Remedial measures for injury to ecosystem". If we move further down the map of Bangladesh to the Southwest side, the region of Khulna is the hometown of the biggest mangrove forest Sundarbans in the world, which is estimated to cover an area of almost 4100 km2. It is an open secret that local people have been clearing out the forests to have a chance to use the wood to earn a living and feed their family and the Government has taken little or no measures to prevent so.

== Impacts ==
Though the act was established in the year of 1995, Bangladesh has not seen much improvement environmentally. In the year of 2011, the capital city of Bangladesh – Dhaka – had been ranked as the world's 2nd least liveable city in the world only beating Harare in Zimbabwe with an overall ranking difference of 1.2%. Though the scenario changed in 2012, when Dhaka was ranked 140 – the last among the liveable countries in the world. Though the overall ranking of livability did not change (was constant at 38.7%), but it did not improve like the other cities like Harare did, which was announced the 4th least liveable city unlike the previous year. The humidity/temperature level of Dhaka was rated as 'uncomfortable' and so was the quality of water. Overall it achieved a rating of 43% in terms of culture and environment (100% being ideal) and a 27% in infrastructure (100% being ideal). This proves the inefficiency of the establishment of the environment law.

Being the least livable country in the world and the capital of the country, Dhaka obviously is on the top of their list. But it is easier said than to be done. One of the laws in the act includes, "Restriction regarding vehicles emitting smoke injurious to health". This law is nearly impossible to establish since Dhaka alone is the home to 7 million people given the fact that the area of the city is only 1463.60 km2. Not to mention most of the people living here are in the working class of the society. Most of them cannot even feed their family properly let alone buy a car for themselves, thus mostly rely on public transportation. Due to huge amount of debt to foreign countries, the Government can only afford to give a little attention to the public transportation system, which resulted in decades-old buses emitting thick black smoke which results in further degradation of the environment.

== Loopholes and criticisms ==
The Bangladesh Environment Conservation Act, 1995 and its Rules, 1997 are not without loopholes or shortcomings. There is a maxim that "prevention is better than cure", but the BECA of 1995 by the terms "improvement of environmental standards" and "mitigation of environmental pollution" in its preamble indicates that it is cure-oriented and it only copes with the curative measures rather than the preventive measures. The BECA, 1995, in true sense, deals with the post-harm situations. In Section 3, the term "Government" is a vague one. It creates the question in our minds – who is the Government under the BECA, 1995? There is no reference to any specific criteria for determining the "Government" who would set up the Department of Environment (DoE) headed by the Director General (DG). Section 4 of the Act gives unfettered and unlimited powers to the Director General (DG) of the Department of Environment (DoE). The wording 'may' in section 4 denotes that the DG is not bound to take necessary measures to conserve the environment and the DG can do anything at his sweet will. Section 5 of the Act requires the Government to declare the "ecologically critical areas". It is palpable that the environment experts can play a vital role in declaring the ecologically critical areas. Section 5 has no reference to the matter. Section 12 of the Act speaks about "Environment Clearance Certificate". It is yet unclear what will happen if the Department of Environment (DoE) is unable to meet the timetable to grant the Environment Clearance Certificate (ECC).
