= Gias Kamal Chowdhury =

- Died: 26 October 2013 (age 74); Dhaka, Bangladesh
- Occupation: Journalist

Gias Kamal Chowdhury (died on 26 October 2013) was a Bangladeshi journalist. He was awarded Ekushey Padak in 1992 by the government of Bangladesh.

== Career ==
Chowdhury was born in Sharishadi village in Feni Sadar Upazila. In 1964 he started his career in journalism with the Dhaka Times. Later he joined Morning News. He was the Dhaka correspondent of Voice of America.

Chowdhury was the president of National Press Club, Dhaka Union of Journalists and Bangladesh Federal Union of Journalists. He was the chief reporter of Bangladesh Sangbad Sangstha. In November 2007, he spoke against demands for war crimes tribunal for crimes committed during Bangladesh Liberation war.
