= Foyez Ahmad =

Faiz Ahmad
- Born: 2 May 1928
- Died: 20 February 2012 (aged 83)
- Occupations: journalist, poet
- Awards: Bangla Academy Literary Award (1976); Ekushey Padak (1991)

Faiz Ahmad (2 May 1928 – 20 February 2012) was a Bangladeshi journalist, poet, politician and cultural activist. He received Bangla Academy Literary Award in 1976 for his contributions in juvenile literature and Ekushey Padak in Journalism category in 1991.

== Early life ==
Ahmad was born on 2 May 1928 at Bikrampur in Dhaka District during the time of British Raj to Golam Mustafa Chowdhury and Arjudaya Banu.

== Awards ==
- Bangla Academy Literary Award (1976)
- Ekushey Padak (1991)
- Shishu Academy Literature Award
- Nurul Qader Shishu Literature Award
