= A. T. M. Afzal =

8th Chief Justice of Bangladesh

ATM Afzal
- এ. টি. এম. আফজাল

8th Chief Justice of Bangladesh
- In office 1 May 1995 – 31 May 1999
- Appointed by: Abdur Rahman Biswas
- President: Abdur Rahman Biswas; Shahabuddin Ahmed
- Prime Minister: Khaleda Zia; Habibur Rahman (acting); Sheikh Hasina
- Preceded by: Habibur Rahman
- Succeeded by: Mustafa Kamal

Abu Taher Mohammad Afzal (known as ATM Afzal) is a Bangladeshi jurist who served as the 8th Chief Justice of Bangladesh.

== Career ==
In 1976, Afzal was the public prosecutor at the trial of Colonel Abu Taher.

Afzal gave a dissenting verdict in the 8th Amendment case, also known as Anwar Hossain Chowdhury vs Bangladesh case, of 1989.

In 2004, Afzal was the chairman of the Law Commission.
