= 1980s in Bangladesh =

Section of Bangladeshi history

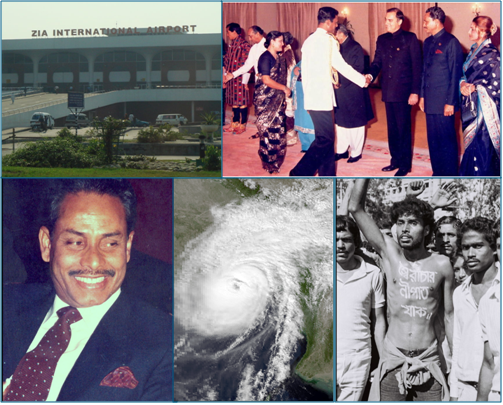
A montage of notable people of and events of Bangladesh in the 1980s including (clockwise from top left): Image of Shahjalal International Airport, originally known as Zia International Airport; HM Ershad's reception for SAARC Head of States in Dhaka 1986; Noor Hossain protesting shortly before he was shot to death by police on 10 November 1987; The 1988 Bangladesh cyclone was one of the worst tropical cyclones in Bangladeshi history and portrait of Hussain Muhammad Ershad, who ruled Bangladesh for most of 1980s.

The 1980s (pronounced "nineteen-eighties", commonly shortened as the "'80s", pronounced "eighties") was a decade of the Gregorian calendar that began on 1 January 1980 and ended on 31 December 1989. For Bangladesh, this decade was characterized by economic hardship, natural disasters and military dictatorship. Hussain Muhammad Ershad ruled Bangladesh almost throughout the decade. Infrastructure development was slow but there was notable progress in local government administration, population control and NGO led microfinance activities which boosted the rural economy. The urge of freedom of speech and return to democracy influenced the cultural activities in the decade.

== Politics and national life ==
=== Assassination of Ziaur Rahman ===
The decade began with President Ziaur Rahman at the helm. Zia faced twenty-one attempted coups against his government, including one by the air force. His one-time ally Colonel Abu Taher was tried for treason and executed. Similar fates were met by many of his perceived rivals in the armed forces. However, the final coup attempt resulted in his assassination in 1981. Zia was killed by troops loyal to Major General Abul Manzoor, who stormed his official residence in Chittagong on 30 May 1981. The mutiny was later suppressed by army chief Lieutenant General Hussain Muhammad Ershad.

=== Sattar administration ===
Zia was succeeded by Vice-president Abdus Sattar. President Sattar received a popular mandate during the 1981 presidential election. Vice-president Mirza Nurul Huda resigned in March 1982. Sattar also suffered from health problems due to old age.

The 1982 Bangladesh coup d'état deposed President Sattar and his civilian government. The Bangladesh military cited food shortages, corruption, and economic mismanagement as reasons behind the coup.

=== Ershad administration ===
Presidential Oath Ceremony after the 1986 election, with the Chief Justice

Army Chief of Staff Lieutenant General Hussain Muhammad Ershad assumed power in a bloodless coup on 24 March 1982, citing the "grave political, economic, and societal crisis" that the nation was in. This move was not unanticipated, as Ershad had previously expressed distaste with the ageing Sattar (who was past his 75th birthday) and his handling of national affairs, in addition to his refusal to allow the army more participation in politics. Like his predecessors, Ershad suspended the constitution and—citing pervasive corruption, ineffectual government, and economic mismanagement—declared martial law. Among his first actions were to privatise the largely state-owned economy (up to 70% of industry was in public ownership) and encourage private investment in heavy industries along with light manufacturing, raw materials, and newspapers. Foreign companies were invited to invest in Bangladeshi industry as well, and stiff protectionist measures were put in place to safeguard manufacturing. All political parties and trade unions were banned for the time being, with the death penalty to be administered for corruption and political agitation. Ershad's takeover was generally viewed as a positive development, as Bangladesh was in a state of serious economic difficulty. Two weeks before the coup in March, Prime Minister Shah Azizur Rahman announced that the country was facing significant food shortages. The government also faced a severe budget deficit to the tune of 4 billion takas, and the IMF declared that it would not provide any more loans until Bangladesh paid down some of its existing debts. The following year, Ershad assumed the presidency, retaining his positions as army chief and CMLA. During most of 1984, Ershad sought the opposition parties' participation in local elections under martial law. The opposition's refusal to participate, however, forced Ershad to abandon these plans. Ershad sought public support for his regime in a national referendum on his leadership in March 1985. He won overwhelmingly, although turnout was small. Two months later, Ershad held elections for local council chairmen. Pro-government candidates won a majority of the posts, setting in motion the president's ambitious decentralisation program. Political life was further liberalised in early 1986, and additional political rights, including the right to hold large public rallies, were restored. At the same time, the Jatiya (National) Party, designed as Ershad's political vehicle for the transition from martial law, was established.

Despite a boycott by the BNP, led by President Zia's widow, Begum Khaleda Zia, parliamentary elections were held on schedule in May 1986. The Jatiya Party won a modest majority of the 300 elected seats in the National Assembly. The participation of the Awami League—led by the late President Mujib's daughter, Sheikh Hasina Wajed—lent the elections some credibility, despite widespread charges of voting irregularities.

Ershad resigned as Army Chief of Staff and retired from military service in preparation for the presidential elections, scheduled for October. Protesting that martial law was still in effect, both the BNP and the AL refused to put up opposing candidates. Ershad easily outdistanced the remaining candidates, taking 84% of the vote. Although Ershad's government claimed a turnout of more than 50%, opposition leaders, and much of the foreign press, estimated a far lower percentage and alleged voting irregularities.

Ershad continued his stated commitment to lift martial law. In November 1986, his government mustered the necessary two-thirds majority in the National Assembly to amend the constitution and confirm the previous actions of the martial law regime. The President then lifted martial law, and the opposition parties took their elected seats in the National Assembly.

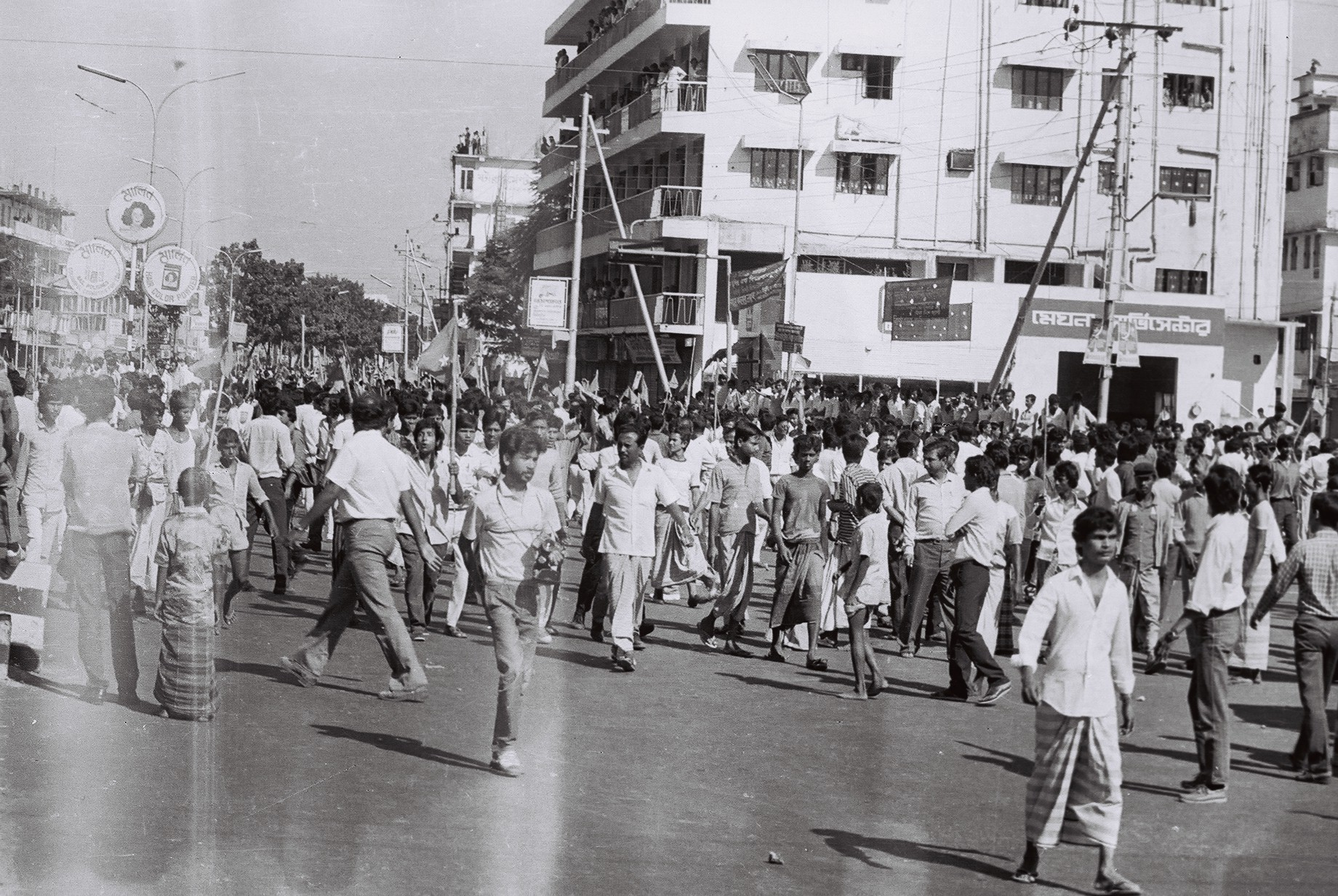
Protest for democracy in Dhaka in 1987

In July 1987, however, after the government hastily pushed through a controversial legislative bill to include military representation on local administrative councils, the opposition walked out of Parliament. Passage of the bill helped spark an opposition movement that quickly gathered momentum, uniting Bangladesh's opposition parties for the first time. The government began to arrest scores of opposition activists under the country's Special Powers Act of 1974. Despite these arrests, opposition parties continued to organise protest marches and nationwide strikes. After declaring a state of emergency, Ershad dissolved Parliament and scheduled fresh elections for March 1988.

All major opposition parties refused government overtures to participate in these polls, maintaining that the government was incapable of holding free and fair elections. Despite the opposition boycott, the government proceeded. The ruling Jatiya Party won 251 of the 300 seats. The Parliament, while still regarded by the opposition as an illegitimate body, held its sessions as scheduled, and passed numerous bills, including, in June 1988, a controversial constitutional amendment making Islam Bangladesh's state religion and provision for setting up High Court benches in major cities outside of Dhaka. While Islam remains the state religion, the provision for decentralising the High Court division has been struck down by the Supreme Court.

By 1989, the domestic political situation in the country seemed to have quieted. The local council elections were generally considered by international observers to have been less violent and more free and fair than previous elections. However, opposition to Ershad's rule began to regain momentum, escalating by the end of 1990 in frequent general strikes, increased campus protests, public rallies, and a general disintegration of law and order.

== Administrative division ==
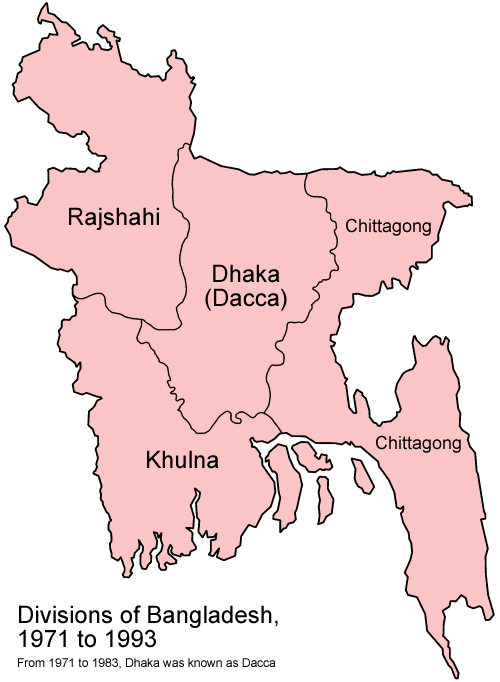

In 1980, Bangladesh was administratively divided into 4 divisions, namely Dhaka, Chittagong, Khulna, and Rajshahi, which were further subdivided into a total of 18 districts (See List of districts of Bangladesh). On 23 December 1982 the Local Government (Thana Parishad and Thana Administration Reorganisation) Ordinance was promulgated to introduce major changes with respect to the system of local government at the thana level. Under the reorganised set-up, thana was designated as the focal point of administration. In 1983, the Local Government Ordinance of 1982 was amended to re-designate and upgrade the existing thanas as upazilas (sub-districts). Furthermore, during 1983–84, 46 new districts were created by upgrading them from thanas or upazilas. By the end of the decade the number of districts stood at 64.

== Demographics ==
Based on World Development Indicators published by the World Bank, the population of Bangladesh grew from 79 million at the beginning of the decade to 104 million by the end. This signifies an annual population growth rate of 2.7%. Population density increased from 609 to 796 per km^{2}.

The urban population was 14.9% of the total at the beginning, which ended up at 19.3%. Dhaka, the largest city, with a population of 3.3 million accounted for 27.0% of the total urban population by 1989. United Nations World Population Prospects show that the population growth rate was on a decreasing trend (from 2.8% per annum to 2.6%), primarily due to reduction in fertility rate (births per woman) from 6.4 to 4.7. Life expectance at birth increased from 53.5 years to 57.8 years with Child (0–5) mortality reducing from 199 per 1,000 births to 150. Age dependency ratio (% of working-age population) changed from 91.9% to 84.7% by the end of the decade.

== Climate ==
=== Temperature and precipitation ===
Climate data for Bangladesh in 1980s
Month	Jan	Feb	Mar	Apr	May	Jun	Jul	Aug	Sep	Oct	Nov	Dec	Year
Daily mean °C (°F)	18.5 (65.3)	20.8 (69.4)	25.1 (77.2)	27.6 (81.7)	27.9 (82.2)	28.4 (83.1)	28.0 (82.4)	28.3 (82.9)	28.1 (82.6)	27.0 (80.6)	23.5 (74.3)	19.8 (67.6)	25.3 (77.5)
Average precipitation mm (inches)	7.3 (0.29)	20.0 (0.79)	54.1 (2.13)	182.0 (7.17)	299.5 (11.79)	434.4 (17.10)	548.2 (21.58)	419.6 (16.52)	319.7 (12.59)	157.8 (6.21)	35.9 (1.41)	14.2 (0.56)	2,492.7 (98.14)
Source: Climatic Research Unit (CRU) of University of East Anglia (UEA)

Compared to prior decade the average annual temperature increased by about 0.3 degree Celsius with most notable increases for the months of December and June. Average rainfall increased for April, May and July leading to overall average annual rainfall increase by about 131mm.

=== Natural disasters ===
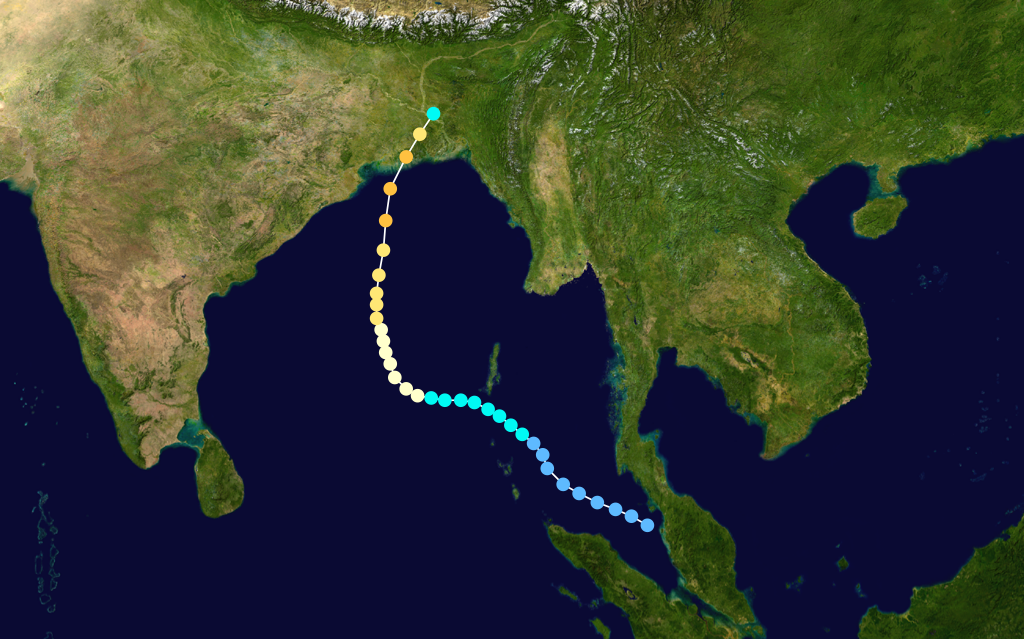
Map plotting the storm's track and intensity, according to the Saffir–Simpson scale Map key Saffir–Simpson scale Tropical depression (≤38 mph, ≤62 km/h) Tropical storm (39–73 mph, 63–118 km/h) Category 1 (74–95 mph, 119–153 km/h) Category 2 (96–110 mph, 154–177 km/h) Category 3 (111–129 mph, 178–208 km/h) Category 4 (130–156 mph, 209–251 km/h) Category 5 (≥157 mph, ≥252 km/h) Unknown Storm type Tropical cyclone Subtropical cyclone Extratropical cyclone, remnant low, tropical disturbance, or monsoon depression

With severe flooding followed by tropical cyclone, 1988 was the year with the worst natural disasters in the decade, and probably one of the worst in the history of independent Bangladesh. The country experienced heavy rain and flooding in August–September 1988. Nearly 25 million people were rendered homeless and official death toll exceeded 500. About 30,000 km of roads were partially destroyed and rice crop on 3.5 million hectares was destroyed or damaged. The situation started to improve in late September, but people rendered homeless due to the flood continued to struggle. Striking in November 1988, a cyclone exacerbated the catastrophic damage from what was then considered the worst floods in Bangladesh's history. The brunt of the tropical cyclone's damage was inflicted upon coastal areas of Bangladesh and West Bengal. A total of 6,240 people were killed as a result of the storm, with 5,708 in Bangladesh. Many of the deaths were a result of the destruction of homes or electrocution after strong winds toppled power poles across the region. Along the coast of Bangladesh, strong storm surge caused heavy infrastructure damage and contributed in wiping out an estimated 70% of all harvestable Bangladeshi crops, with an estimated 200,000 tonnes (220,000 tons) of crops being lost.

== Economy ==
=== National income and balance of payment ===
Bangladesh GDP was US$28.6 billion in 1980, which grew to US$40.2 billion in 1989 (in 2010 constant dollar) signifying a 3.4% annual growth. Agricultural Sector contributed to 31.6% of GDP in the beginning of the decade, which increased to 32.9% by the end. During the same period contribution from the industrial sector decreased from 20.6% to 20.3% and that of the service sector decreased from 47.8% to 46.8%. Per capita GDP marginally increased from US$351 to US$388 (in 2010 constant dollar).

According to World Development Indicators published by the World Bank, on 2010 constant dollar basis, Bangladesh used to export US$1.2 billion (5.5% of GDP) worth of goods and services as of 1980, which marginally declined to US$1.1 billion (5.5% of GDP) in 1989. During the same time import of goods and services decreased from US$4.6 billion (17.9% of GDP) to US$2.8 billion (12.8% of GDP). Over the decade, Foreign Direct Investment and Personal Remittances Receipt averaged 0.01% and 2.64% of GDP; while, total Reserve averaged at 6.6% of external debt and 2.0 month's coverage of import.

Gross National Income (at 2010 constant dollar) grew from US$22.3 billion to US$28.4 billion over the decade. At the beginning of this period External Debt stock (of which concessional debt was 71.8%) was 6.1% of gross national income (GNI) and External Debt Service burden was 0.1% of GNI. By the end of the decade, External Debt stock (of which concessional debt now was 80.3%) stood at 19.1% of GNI and External Debt Service burden was 1.3% of the same. During the same period Military expenditure increased from 0.6% to 0.9% of GNI.

=== Agriculture ===
Aggregate value addition from agricultural sector was US$7.7 billion in 1980 (in 2010 constant USD), which grew at average annual rate of 1.4% to US$8.9 billion by 1989 (in the same constant USD). During this decade, crop production grew at an annual average rate of 2.0% driven by cereal production increase from 21.7 million metric tons to 27.9 million (implying annual growth of 2.5%) - enabled by improvement in cereal yield from 2006 kg per hectare to 2500 kg. At the same time livestock production grew at annual rate of 2.9% and fisheries production increased at 2.6% per annum. Altogether these contributed to overall food production increase by annualized rate of 2.2%.

=== Industrial and service sectors ===
Net value addition from industrial sector, which stood at US$4.0 billion in 1980 (in 2010 constant USD), grew at average annual rate of 5.2% to US$6.6 billion by 1989 (in the same constant USD basis). Manufacturing sector contributed 70.7% of industrial value added in the beginning of this period and it gradually changed to 64.6% by the end. By 1989 Manufacturers export accounted for 74.0% of total merchandise export while import supporting the manufacturing segment accounted for 56.7% of total merchandise import. In that year, textile and garments accounted for 37.7% of the value addition of the manufacturing sector. There were 1,347 recorded industrial design applications by Bangladeshi residents in this decade. In 1979-80 there were 3,006 industrial establishments in the country employing 0.42 million staffs. By 1989-90 the number of establishments grew to 24,283 and employment in the sector grew to 1.08 million.

On the other hand, net value addition from the service sector amounting US$15.8 billion in 1980, also grew at average annual rate of 3.8% and stood at US$22.9 billion by 1989 (in 2010 constant USD). Major Businesses / enterprises that started journey in this decade in Bangladesh include Beximco Pharma in 1980, PRAN-RFL Group in 1981, BTI and Ha-meem Group in 1984, Orion Group, Paradise Group, S. Alam Group and Summit Group in 1985, Bashundhara Group in 1987 and Sheltech, Citycell and Meghna Group in 1989.

== Infrastructure ==
=== Transportation ===
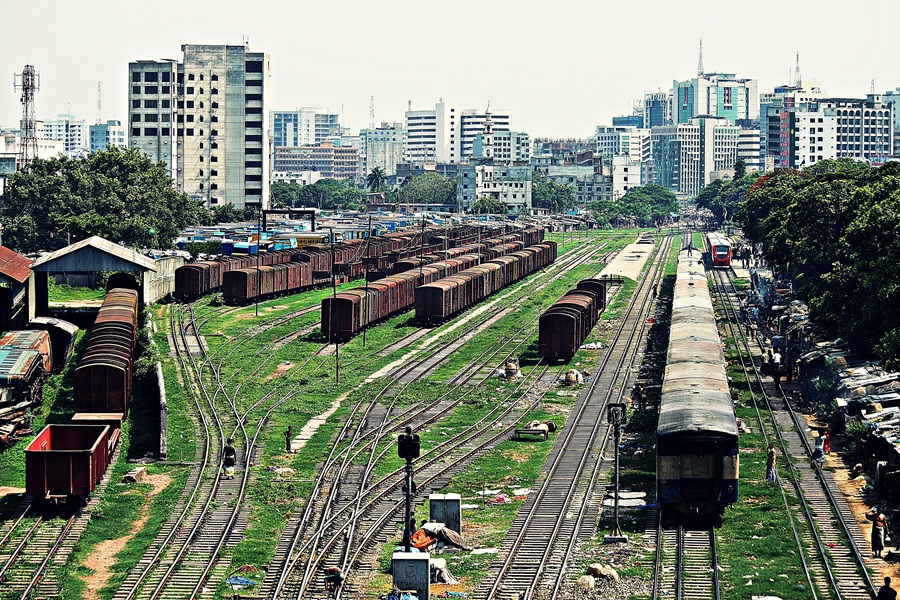
Inland container depot (ICD) at Kamalapur Railway Station was introduced in 1987.

When Bangladesh achieved independence in 1971, it inherited 3,860 km of paved roads which increased to about 6,600 km by end of the 1980s. On the contrary, by the end of the decade Bangladesh Railway was still operating a route of 2,800 km - roughly the same as that in the earlier decade. A UNDP funded Bangladesh Transportation Sector Study executed by World Bank in 1988 estimated that by 1985 the ground transport system of Bangladesh was already supporting 35 billion km of passenger commute and 4.8 billion km of freight transport. Road network accounted for 64% of the passengers and 48% of the freight whereas 20% of the passengers and 17% of the freight were transported using the rail network - indicating a significant shift from rail to road network compared to earlier decade. Still the railway sector was not uneventful in this decade. The Kamalapur railway station started providing container services with the establishment of the first inland container depot (ICD) of the country on 11 April 1987. Furthermore, to improve operational efficiency and safety, an optical fibre digital telecommunication network was installed over 1,800 km connecting about 300 railway stations during 1985–90.

The inland water transport sector also saw some development during this decade with the opening of major river ports at Nagarbari (1983), Aricha (1983), Daulatdia (1983), Baghabari (1983) and Narsingdi (1989). However, ferry delays, siltation of the river system and shortage of capacity remained major bottlenecks of this sector. Air Transport sector also did not grow much in this decade. As of 1979, there were 14,800 registered carrier departures worldwide which ended up to 14,600 by 1989. During the same period number of passenger carried increased from 0.62 million to about 1.00 million per annum.

=== Telecommunication ===
In 1981, Bangladesh got its first Digital Telex Exchange. Automatic Digital ITX started in Dhaka in 1983. BTTB introduced Coinbox Telephone services in 1985 and GENTEX Telegraph messaging services. In 1989, Bangladesh Rural Telecom Authority got license to operate exchanges in 200 upazilas and privately owned Sheba Telecom got license to operate exchange is 199 upazilas. The same year cellular mobile phone company Pacific Bangladesh Telephone Limited and Bangladesh Telecom got license.

In the beginning of the decade there were 95,000 fixed telephone line subscription in the country - which increased to 192,000 by the end signifying 0.19 lines per 100 people.

=== Energy ===
In 1980 per capital electric power consumption was 18.7 kWh, which increased to 49.2 kWh by 1989. During the same period per capital energy usage increased from 103.1 kg of oil equivalent to 116.8 kg and fossil fuel energy consumption increased from 32.1% to 45.1% of total.

In 1980 the electricity produced in the country was coming from: hydroelectric sources: 24.8%, natural gas sources: 48.6% and oil sources: 26.6%. By 1989 there was a significant move towards natural gas based electricity production and as a result, the distribution changed to hydroelectric sources: 12.9%, natural gas sources: 78.9% and oil sources: 8.2%.

In 1982 the eastern and western parts of Bangladesh were electrically connected through the commissioning of double circuit 230 KV transmission line across the Jamuna river energized at 132 KV through the first East-West Interconnector. In 1989 Petrobangla contracted Chevron to develop the Bibiyana, Jalalabad, and Moulvibazar gas fields, which allowed Chevron to eventually become the largest gas producer in the country.

=== Financial services ===
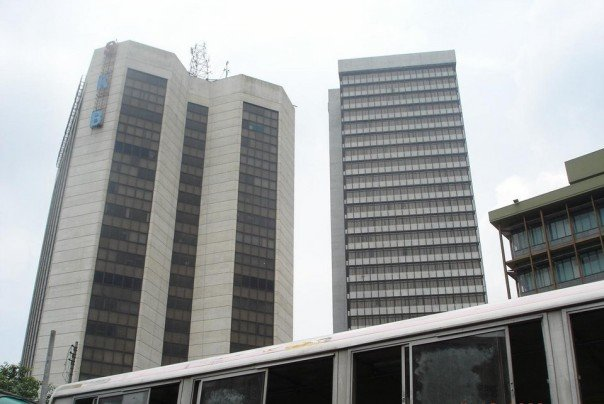
SKB and BB Building, both completed in 1980s shaped the skyline of Dhaka in the decade.

While in the 1970s the Financial Sector of Bangladesh was dominated by Public Sector banks (see here), in the 1980s the Government started to pursue Privatization agenda. Uttara Bank and Pubali Bank were privatized in 1983. Other Private banks which started operation in this decade include Islami Bank Bangladesh, United Commercial Bank, The City Bank and National Bank in 1983, Arab Bangladesh Bank in 1985 and Al Baraka Bank (later named Oriental bank and subsequently ICB Islamic Bank) in 1987.

The government's encouragement during the late 1970s and early 1980s of agricultural development and private industry brought changes in lending strategies. The number of rural bank branches doubled between 1977 and 1985, to more than 3,330. Denationalisation and private industrial growth led the Bangladesh Bank and the World Bank to focus their lending on the emerging private manufacturing sector. Scheduled bank advances to private agriculture, as a percentage of sectoral GDP, rose from 2 percent in FY 1979 to 11 percent in FY 1987, while advances to private manufacturing rose from 13 percent to 53 percent.

The transformation of finance priorities brought with it problems in administration. No sound project-appraisal system was in place to identify viable borrowers and projects. Lending institutions were often instructed by the political authorities. In addition, the incentive system for the banks stressed disbursements rather than recoveries, and the accounting and debt collection systems were inadequate to deal with the problems of loan recovery. The rate of recovery on agricultural loans was only 27 percent in FY 1986, and the rate on industrial loans was even worse. As a result of this poor showing, major donors applied pressure to induce the Government and banks to take firmer action to strengthen internal bank management and credit discipline. As a consequence, recovery rates began to improve in 1987. The National Commission on Money, Credit, and Banking recommended broad structural changes in Bangladesh's system of financial intermediation early in 1987, many of which were built into a three-year compensatory financing facility signed by Bangladesh with the IMF in February 1987.

One major exception to the management problems of Bangladeshi banks was the Grameen Bank, which begun as a government project in 1976 and established in 1983 as an independent bank. In the late 1980s, the bank continued to provide financial resources to the poor on reasonable terms and to generate productive self-employment without external assistance. About 70 percent of the borrowers were women, who were otherwise not much represented in institutional finance. The average loan by the Grameen Bank in the mid-1980s was around Tk2,000 (US$25), and the maximum was just Tk18,000 (for construction of a tin-roof house). Repayment terms were 4 percent for rural housing and 8.5 percent for normal lending operations.

The wave of Privatization touched the insurance sector and capital market as well. Until 1985, Jiban Bima Corporation was the only institution to handle life insurance business in Bangladesh. Through the Insurance (Amendment) Ordinance 1984 and Insurance Corporations (Amendment) Ordinance 1984, the government allowed the private sector to establish insurance companies. In the mid-1980s, two private investment companies namely, National Credit Ltd. and Bangladesh Commerce and Investment Ltd., were permitted to participate in the capital market, although their activities remained limited.

=== Education ===
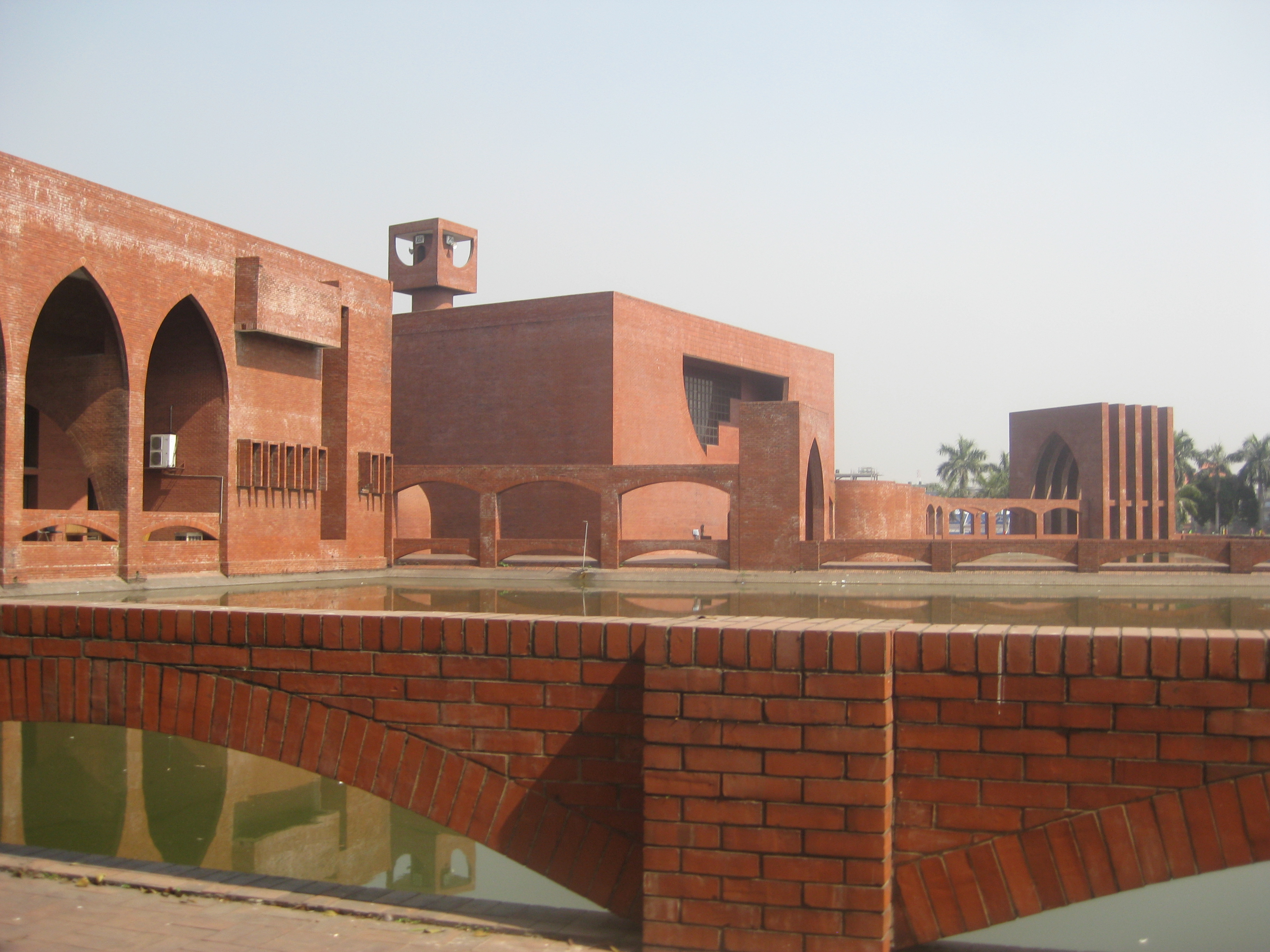
Islamic University of Technology Gagipur started its journey in the 1980s

During the 1980s, the reports of 'Mazid Khan Commission 1983' and 'Mofiz Commission 1988' on education were not formally adopted for implementation, but the Ershad Government took a number of measures to increase the salary subvention to non- government educational institutions including the formation of BCS (General Education) Cadre. The period also saw increased focus on religious education. The primary education coverage did not improve much from earlier decade. 4.5-5.5 million primary-school-age children remained outside schools throughout the decade; and even for those in school, there were only 1.9 teachers per 1,000 students.

Based on World Bank data, in 1980, there were 2.66 million secondary school students (including higher secondary) in the country, which grew to 3.41 million by the end of the decade. Secondary school enrollment rate slightly improved from 18.5% to 19.9% during the same period. Due to increased focus on female education, ratio of female students in secondary education improved significantly from 24.1% to 32.4%. Number of teachers covering the students grew from 112 to 130 thousand.

Throughout this decade the secondary and higher secondary education administration for the country, used to be managed by 4 general education boards set-up in the 1960s, namely Dhaka, Rajshahi, Comilla and Jessore; a Technical Education Board and a Madrasah Education Board. The office of the Director of Public Instruction (DPI) was upgraded as the Directorate of Secondary and Higher Education (DSHE) in 1981.

Since independence the tertiary education of the country used to be managed by four general education universities, namely University of Dhaka, University of Rajshahi, University of Chittagong and Jahangirnagar University along with 2 specialized universities - Bangladesh University of Engineering & Technology and Bangladesh Agricultural University. In addition, Institute of Postgraduate Medicine and Research (IPGMR) served as a Government-controlled postgraduate institute for medical research and studies. On 22 November 1979, the foundation of the Islamic University was set up in Kushtia, but it began operations on 28 June 1986. Islamic University of Technology, first known as Islamic Center for Technical, Vocational Training and Research (ICTVTR) was proposed in the 9th Islamic Conference of Foreign Ministers (ICFM) held in Dakar, Senegal on 24–28 April 1978. Foundation stone of ICTVTR was laid by president Ziaur Rahman of Bangladesh on 27 March 1981 in the presence of Yasir Arafat, the then-chairman of the PLO, and Habib Chatty, the then-Secretary General of OIC. The construction of the campus was completed at Gazipur in 1987 at a cost of US$11 Million and ICTVTR was formally inaugurated by the President of Bangladesh on 14 July 1988.

The Shahjalal University of Science and Technology was also established in this decade (1986), but it started its career on 13 February 1991.

=== Mass media ===
In the 1980s the Government continued to maintain tight control over the mass media. In March 1982 General Hossain Mohammad Ershad ordered the suspension of a number of newspapers and made penalty provisions for criticizing Martial Law. In this environment the newspapers continued to operate and a few notable publications started their journey - including Daily Inqilab and Jaijaidin. In 1988, United News of Bangladesh was founded as the country's first fully computerised privately owned news agency.

Bangladesh Television, the state-owned television network, started transmission in colour-format from the beginning of the decade. It continued to serve as the only television network available in the country throughout the decade. The state-owned Radio Bangladesh (later renamed Bangladesh Betar) was the only radio station in the country. It shifted its head office to the National Broadcasting House, Agargaon in 1983.

== Awards and recognitions ==
- Sir Fazle Hasan Abed, the founder of BRAC, was awarded Ramon Magsaysay Award in 1980.
- Bangladeshi author Abdullah-Al-Muti won the UNESCO Kalinga Prize in 1983.
- Muhammad Yunus, the founder of Grameen Bank, was awarded Ramon Magsaysay Award in 1984.
- Zafrullah Chowdhury, the founder of Gonoshasthaya Kendra, was awarded Ramon Magsaysay Award in 1985.
- Bangladeshi diplomat Humayun Rashid Choudhury was elected president of the 41st session of the UN General Assembly in 1986.
- Richard William Timm, was awarded Ramon Magsaysay Award for his work in Bangladesh in 1987.
- Mohammad Yeasin, the promoter of Deedar Comprehensive Village Development Cooperative Society, was awarded the Ramon Magsaysay Award in 1988.

== Culture ==
=== Literature ===
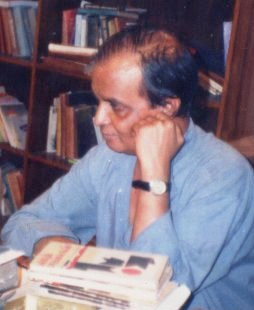
Ahmed Sofa (1943-2001)

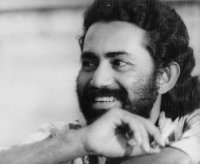
Rudra Muhammad Shahidullah (1956-1991)

In the 1980s Bangladesh had a vibrant literary scene. The struggle of contemporary life under autocratic rule has often come up as the central theme of the works produced. Notable literary works from Bangladeshi authors from this decade include Shawkat Osman's Artanad; Selina Hossain's Yapita Jiban, Nil Mayurer Yauban, Chand Bene, Pokamakader Gharbasati and Nirantar Ghantadhvani; Humayun Ahmed's Aguner Poroshmoni; Rahat Khan's Bhalamander Taka; Syed Shamsul Huq's Duratva, Nuruldiner Sara Jiban, Mahashunye Paran Master, Ayna Bibir Pala, Swapna Sankranta and Bristi O Bidrohigon; Hasan Azizul Huq's Patale Haspatale; Abu Rushd's Mahendra Mistanna Bhandar; Akhtaruzzaman Elias' Khoyari, Chilekothar Sepai and Dudhbhate Utpat, Shamsur Rahman's Octopus, Montage , poetry Khub Beshi Valo Thakte Nei and Buk Tar Bangladesher Hridoy, Mamunur Rashid's drama Ora Achhe Balei, Ekhane Nobar and Iblis, Selim Al Deen's Kittankhola; Momtajuddin Ahmed's Ki Chaha Shankhachil; Ahsan Habib's poetry Megh Bole Choitrey Jabo; Rudra Mohammad Shahidullah's Firey Chai Swarno Gram, Manusher Manchitra, Chhobolo, Galpa and Diechi Shokol Akaash; Moinul Ahsan Saber's Porasto Sahish and Pathor Somoy; Muhammed Zafar Iqbal's Dipu Number Two; Humayun Azad's Shob Kichu Noshtoder Odhikare Jabe, Nilima Ibrahim's Banhi Balay; M. R. Akhter Mukul's autobiographical Ami Bijoy Dekhechi; Jahanara Imam's Ekatturer Dinguli; and Bashir Al Helal's non-fiction Bhasha Andoloner Itihas; Ahmed Sofa's Ekjan Ali Kenaner Utthan Patan and Maranbilash ; Mokbula Manzoor's Atmaja O Amra and Imdadul Haq Milan's Rupnagor. In this decade the literature circle of the country lost luminaries like: Qazi Motahar Hossain (1981), Muhammad Enamul Haque (1982), Aroj Ali Matubbar (1985), poet Ahsan Habib (1985) and Abu Hena Mustafa Kamal (1989).

=== Visual arts ===
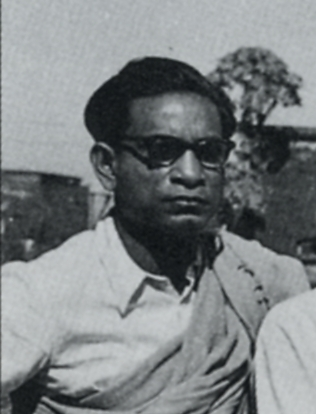
"Potua" Quamrul Hassan (1921–1988)

Throughout the 80s the photography field was vibrant. While the stalwarts like Manzoor Alam Beg, Pavel Rahman and Anwar Hossain were active, documentary photography practice was pioneered by Shahidul Alam; who went on to set up the Drik Picture Library in 1989. The field of painting was equally active with the painters experimenting with a number of mediums in various branches of art. Painter SM Sultan did some of his best work in the 1980s. Artist Shahabuddin Ahmed was another major contributor in the field. Painter cartoonist Rafiqun Nabi made his mark with his creation "tokai". The emergence of a large number of female painters was a notable development of the decade. While abstract form remained dominant, other ultra-modern western trends such as conceptual art, especially installation, started to become popular in Bangladeshi art. Notable painters from this decade include Ranjit Das, Kazi Raqib, Jamal Ahmed, Muhammad Eunus, Tarun Ghosh, Shahadat Husain, Ruhul Amin Kajol, GS Kabir, Dhali Al-Mamun, Nasreen Begum, Rokeya Sultana, Shishir Bhattacharjee, Nazlee Laila Mansur, Dilara Begum Jolly, Niloofar Chaman and Atia Islam Anne. However, in this decade the death of master painter, "Potua" Quamrul Hassan (1984) made the nation grieve. The 1980s were an important period in architecture because divergent ideas started to pervade the country's architectural thought. An architectural research group named Chetona (awareness) aimed to make critical thought an integral part of architectural practice. The Aga Khan Award for Architecture also had a significant impact in this decade. Bangladeshi Architect Fazlur Rahman Khan continued to perform at his peak in this decade, though most of his creations were outside Bangladesh.

=== Performing arts ===
In this decade music directors and composers like Alauddin Ali, Alam Khan, Khandaker Nurul Alam and Ali Hossain and singers like Sabina Yasmin, Andrew Kishore, Subir Nandi, Runa Laila, Syed Abdul Hadi, Mitali Mukherjee and Nilufar Yasmin led the music arena with modern Bengali music and playback music of films. Uccharon were the biggest band of that era; and their frontman Azam Khan, a freedom fighter, cemented himself as a pop culture phenomenon. On the other hand, Spondan featuring musicians like Nasir Ahmed Apu, Firoz Shai, Ferdous Wahid, reinvented Bangla folk music and became one of the most popular rock bands of the time. The Akhand Brothers Band (featuring Lucky and Happy Akhand), who produced several hit songs in that decade led the scene of pop music, until Happy met an untimely demise in 1987. Successful music bands like Souls, Feedback, Feelings (later renamed Nagar Baul) and Miles release their first albums in this decade.

The theatre groups which started their journey in the 1970s continued to production in this decade, but due to financial constrains the initial zeal somehow subsided. Notebale among these in Dhaka city were Theatre, Nagarik Natya Sampraday, Natyachakra, Aranyak Natyadal, Dhaka Theatre and, in Chittagong, Theatre '73, Tirjak Nattyagoshthi and Arindam. The range of texts performed by the groups varied widely, from Euro-American plays to contemporary originals written by group members themselves. Among the leading playwrights were Abdullah al Mamun, Mamunur Rashid, Syed Shamsul Huq, Selim Al Deen, and Momtazuddin Ahmed. In response to the ongoing struggle against the autocratic rule in the political arena, many groups also took up theatre as a medium for popular protest. Another important area of proliferation was the Mukta Natak movement initiated by Aranyak, in which members of the group sought to create performances with rural landless peasants. In mainstream theatre, a notable development was the attempt taken up by Dhaka Theatre and a number of other groups to incorporate indigenous performance elements in modern theatre practice.

=== Cinema ===
The 1970s and 1980s were a golden era for the Bangladeshi film industry, both commercially and critically. A number of actors and actresses enjoyed popularity during this period, including Abdur Razzak, who was the most successful actor commercially during this period, as well as Kabori Sarwar, Shabana, Farida Akhter Bobita, Farooque, Shabnam, Kohinoor Akhter Shuchanda, Alamgir, Sohel Raana, Amol Bose, Bulbul Ahmed, Zafar Iqbal, Wasim, Ilias Kanchan, Jashim, Rozina, Parveen Sultana Diti and Champa.

In the 1980s most of the Bangladeshi commercial films were influenced in film-making, style and presentation by Indian movies, mostly Hindi movies from Maharashtra. But many of the films were original or adaptation from literary works. Some notable original and adapted films include, Chhutir Ghonta (1980) by Azizur Rahman; Emiler Goenda Bahini (1980) by Badal Rahman; Shokhi Tumi Kar (1980), Akhoni Shomoy (1980) by Abdullah Al Mamun; Lal Shobujer Pala (1980), Obichar (1985) by Syed Hasan Imam; Koshai (1980), Jonmo Theke Jolchi (1981), Bhat De (1984) by Amjad Hossain; Devdas (1982), Chandranath (1984), Shuvoda (1987) by Chashi Nazrul Islam; Smriti Tumi Bedona (1980) by Dilip Shom; Mohona (1982), Porinita (1986) by Alamgir Kabir; Boro Bhalo Lok Chhilo (1982) by Mohammad Mohiuddin; Puroshkar (1983) by C.B Zaman; Maan Shomman (1983) by A.J Mintu; Nazma (1983), Shokal-Shondha (1984), Fulshojja (1986) by Subhash Dutta; Rajbari (1984) by Kazi Hayat; Grihilokkhi (1984) by Kamal Ahmed; Dahan (1986) by Sheikh Niamat Ali; Shot Bhai (1985) by Abdur Razzak; Ramer Shumoti (1985) by Shahidul Amin; Rajlokkhi-Srikanto (1986) by Bulbul Ahmed; Harano Shur (1987) by Narayan Ghosh Mita; Dayi Ke (1987) by Aftab Khan Tulu; Tolpar (1988) by Kabir Anowar and Biraj Bou (1988) by Mohiuddin Faruk.

The parallel cinema movement was officially started from this decade, though there were many off-track movies were made of different genres from the 60s. But the 80s movies were strictly commercial influenced by Indian Hindi commercial films, so there was a necessity of a realism and naturalism cinema movement. The movement was started by Alamgir Kabir. From this movement some intellectual filmmakers came such as, Tanvir Mokammel, Tareque Masud and Morshedul Islam.

=== Television ===
Throughout the 1980s Bangladesh Television (BTV) was the only television channel available to the audience in Bangladesh as international TV channel transmission was not allowed by the Government. BTV began colour transmissions in 1980, marking the first official full-time colour broadcasts in South Asia. As of 1986, BTV broadcast for 9 hours a weekday and 14 hours on weekends. It usually aired during the evening hours, with special programming on Fridays, national and religious holidays. Fazle Lohani's Jodi Kichhu Mone Na Koren, which started in the late 70s, continued as one of the most popular magazine show of BTV till his death in 1985. In this decade Bangladesh Television created several popular television series and stand alone drama shows. Drama serials Shokal Shondhya gained popularity among the audience as it portrayed the lifestyle of middle-class people. Later on two other drama serials named Ei Shob Din Ratri and Bohubrihi, both written by Humayun Ahmed, became widely popular. Other successful productions included Fodor Dostoyvsky's The Idiot adapted by Abdullah Al Mamun, Mustafa Monwar's version of Rabindranath Tagore's Raktokarobi and William Shakespeare's The Taming of the Shrew. Thanks to the popular drama productions, television actors like Humayun Faridi, Afzal Hossain, Asaduzzaman Nur, Abul Hayat, Aly Zaker, Bulbul Ahmed, Suborna Mustafa, Shampa Reza, Priscilla Parvin, Sara Zaker and Afroza Banu, among others, became household names. Mati O Manush was a documentary program on agriculture which debuted in the mid-80s and became both popular and influential. In addition to its own program BTV started to air several foreign television series, such as "V", "Dallas", The Fall Guy, Knight Rider, The A-Team, Manimal, Thundercats and MacGyver, which became popular with Bangladeshi TV audience.

=== Sports ===
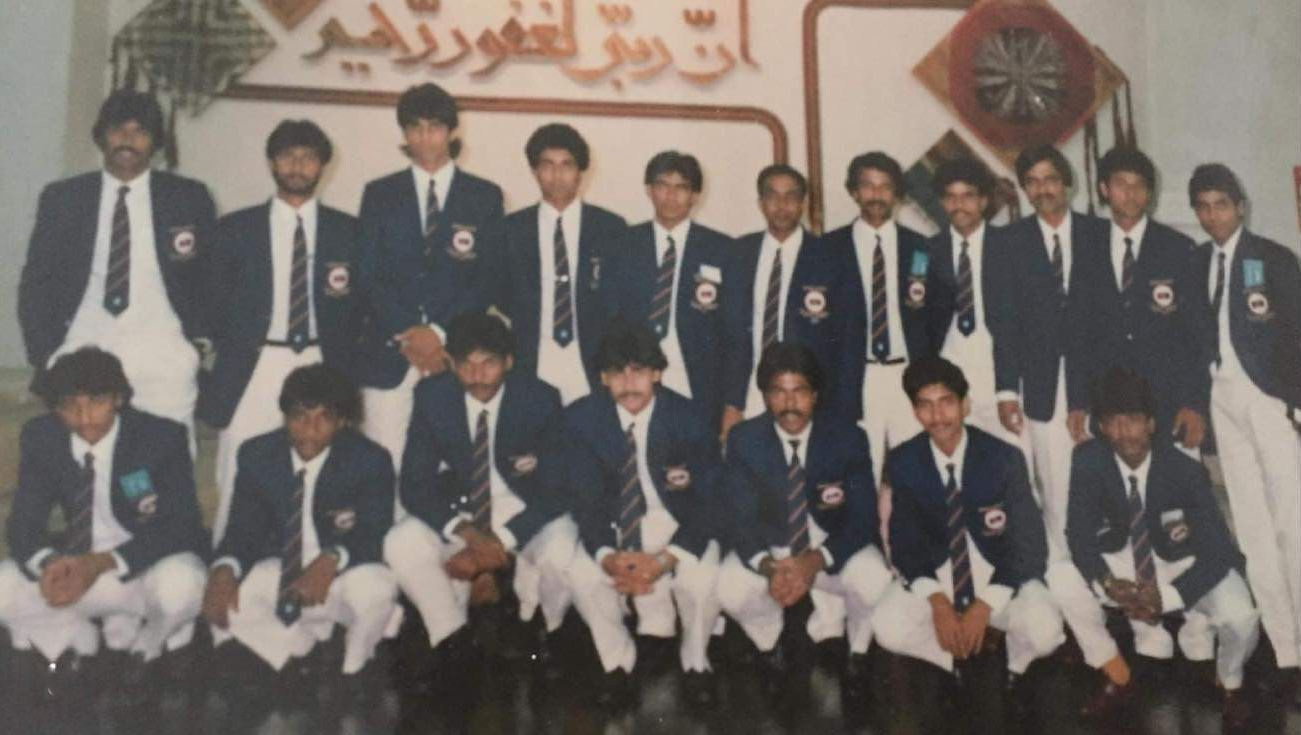
Bangladesh football team at Pakistan's 1987 Quaid-e-Azam International Tournament

The 1980s was a decade of challenges and achievements for Bangladesh sports. The most popular sport in the country was football, which attracted large crowds and media attention. The Dhaka Derby was the most significant game in domestic football while the Bangladesh national team also earned international recognition by qualifying for the 1980 AFC Asian Cup, in Kuwait. In 1985, Bangladesh took part in the 1986 World Cup qualifiers, and were grouped along with India, Indonesia and Thailand. The country's first ever win at the qualifiers came against Indonesia. Nonetheless, the team finished bottom of the group, behind Thailand on goal difference. In the wake of their first World Cup qualifying campaign, Bangladesh took part in the 1985 South Asian Games as one of the favorites. The team cruised through the group-stages, claiming their biggest ever win in an 8–0 thrashing of Maldives along the way, but luck was not on their side, as they lost to India on penalties in the final.

Bangladesh gained recognition from International Olympic Committee on 1 January 1980, which opened new opportunities for other sports. One of them was Men's 100m sprint and relay, in which Bangladesh won several gold medals in South Asian Games between 1984 and 1987. Another sport that showed progress was cricket, with the country playing its first ODI match against Pakistan in 1986. Chess also became popular among young people, with Niaz Murshed becoming South Asia's first Grandmaster in 1987. Despite economic hardship and political instability, Bangladesh sports showed resilience and potential in the 1980s.

== See also ==
Years in Bangladesh in the decade of

1980s
1980
1981
1982
1983
1984
1985
1986
1987
1988
1989
