= 1982 in Bangladesh =

- Centuries: 20th; 21st
- Decades: 1960s; 1970s; 1980s; 1990s; 2000s
- See also: Other events of 1982; List of years in Bangladesh

1982 (MCMLXXXII) was a common year starting on Friday of the Gregorian calendar, the 1982nd year of the Common Era (CE) and Anno Domini (AD) designations, the 982nd year of the 2nd millennium, the 82nd year of the 20th century, and the 3rd year of the 1980s decade.

The year 1982 was the 11th year after the Independence of Bangladesh. It was also the first year of the Government of Hussain Muhammad Ershad.

== Incumbents ==
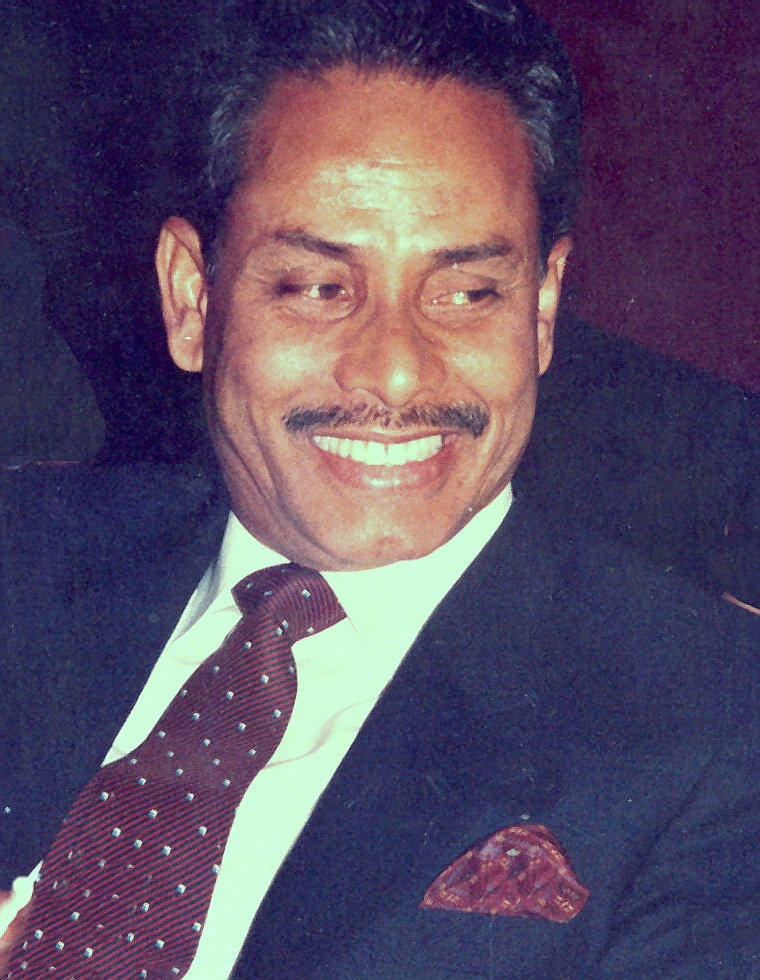
H. M.
Ershad

- President:
  - until 24 March: Abdus Sattar
  - 24 – 27 March: Hussain Muhammad Ershad
  - starting 27 March: A. F. M. Ahsanuddin Chowdhury
- Prime Minister: Shah Azizur Rahman (until 24 March)
- Vice President: Mirza Nurul Huda (until 23 March); Mohammad Mohammadullah (starting and ending in 1982)
- Chief Justice: Kemaluddin Hossain (until 12 April), F.K.M. Munim (starting 12 April)

== Events ==
- 7 December - 4 are fatalities were reported after colliding between a Bus and Train in Habiganj.

== Demography ==
Demographic Indicators for Bangladesh in 1982
Population, total	83,932,132
Population density (per km^{2})	644.8
Population growth (annual %)	2.6%
Male to Female Ratio (every 100 Female)	106.5
Urban population (% of total)	16.2%
Birth rate, crude (per 1,000 people)	41.9
Death rate, crude (per 1,000 people)	13.7
Mortality rate, under 5 (per 1,000 live births)	189
Life expectancy at birth, total (years)	53.8
Fertility rate, total (births per woman)	6.1

== Climate ==
Climate data for Bangladesh in 1982
Month	Jan	Feb	Mar	Apr	May	Jun	Jul	Aug	Sep	Oct	Nov	Dec	Year
Daily mean °C (°F)	19. (66)	20.4 (68.7)	23.7 (74.7)	26.8 (80.2)	29.1 (84.4)	28. (82)	28.6 (83.5)	27.9 (82.2)	28.3 (82.9)	27. (81)	22.7 (72.9)	18.9 (66.0)	25. (77)
Average precipitation mm (inches)	.4 (0.02)	16.7 (0.66)	42.5 (1.67)	165.8 (6.53)	177.9 (7.00)	392. (15.4)	386. (15.2)	581. (22.9)	269.5 (10.61)	41.2 (1.62)	37.6 (1.48)	3.6 (0.14)	2,114.2 (83.24)
Source: Climatic Research Unit (CRU) of University of East Anglia (UEA)

== Economy ==
Key Economic Indicators for Bangladesh in 1982
National Income
	Current US$	Current BDT	% of GDP
GDP	$18.5 billion	BDT371.2 billion	
GDP growth (annual %)	2.1%		
GDP per capita	$220.7	BDT4,423	
Agriculture, value added	$5.8 billion	BDT116.7 billion	31.4%
Industry, value added	$3.7 billion	BDT74.4 billion	20.0%
Services, etc., value added	$8.5 billion	BDT171.3 billion	46.1%
Balance of Payment
	Current US$	Current BDT	% of GDP
Current account balance	-$500.7 million		-2.7%
Imports of goods and services	$2,660.8 million	BDT57.7 billion	15.5%
Exports of goods and services	$986.6 million	BDT18.8 billion	5.1%
Foreign direct investment, net inflows	$7.0 million		0.0%
Personal remittances, received	$526.5 million		2.8%
Total reserves (includes gold) at year end	$208.5 million		
Total reserves in months of imports	0.9		

Note: For the year 1982, average official exchange rate for BDT was 22.12 per US$.

== Events ==
- 24 March - Lt. Gen. Hussain Muhammad Ershad assumes power through a bloodless coup overthrowing Abdus Sattar's government.
- 26 June - Bangladesh adopts standards of weights and measures based on metric system.
- 4 October - Bangladesh signs with India a memorandum of understanding on water sharing for two years.
- Bangladesh enacted the National Drug Policy which helped develop the drug manufacturing industry in Bangladesh.

=== Awards and recognitions ===
==== Independence Day Award ====
Recipients	Area	Note
M. A. Rashid	education	posthumous
Kazi Mohammad Mosharraf Hossain	social work	posthumous
Syed Murtaza Ali	literature	posthumous
Anwarul Haque	fine arts	posthumous
Begum Feroza Bari	social service	

==== Ekushey Padak ====
1. Syed Ali Ahsan (literature)
2. Abul Hasan (literature)
3. Talim Hossain (literature)
4. Abdul Hakim (education)
5. Ful Mohammad (music)
6. SM Sultan (fine arts)
7. G A Mannan (literature)
8. Sanaullah Nuri (journalism)

=== Sports ===
- Domestic football:
  - Mohammedan SC won 1982 Dhaka First Division League title while Abahani KC became runner-up.
  - Mohammedan SC and Abahani KC jointly won the title of Bangladesh Federation Cup.

== Births ==
- 2 June – Topu, singer
- 15 June – Abdur Razzak, cricketer
- 27 October – Wasfia Nazreen, mountaineer and activist
- 25 December – Tapash Baisya, cricketer

== Deaths ==
- 16 February – Enamul Haque, writer (b. 1902)
- 27 March – Fazlur Rahman Khan, structural engineer and architect (b. 1929)
- 5 May – Phuljhuri Khan, instrumentalist (b. 1920)

== See also ==
- 1980s in Bangladesh
- Timeline of Bangladeshi history
- History of Bangladesh
