= 1985 in Bangladesh =

- Centuries: 20th; 21st
- Decades: 1960s; 1970s; 1980s; 1990s; 2000s
- See also: Other events of 1985; List of years in Bangladesh

1985 (MCMLXXXV) was a common year starting on Tuesday of the Gregorian calendar, the 1985th year of the Common Era (CE) and Anno Domini (AD) designations, the 985th year of the 2nd millennium, the 85th year of the 20th century, and the 6th year of the 1980s decade.

The year 1985 was the 14th year after the independence of Bangladesh. It was also the fourth year of the government of Hussain Muhammad Ershad.

== Incumbents ==
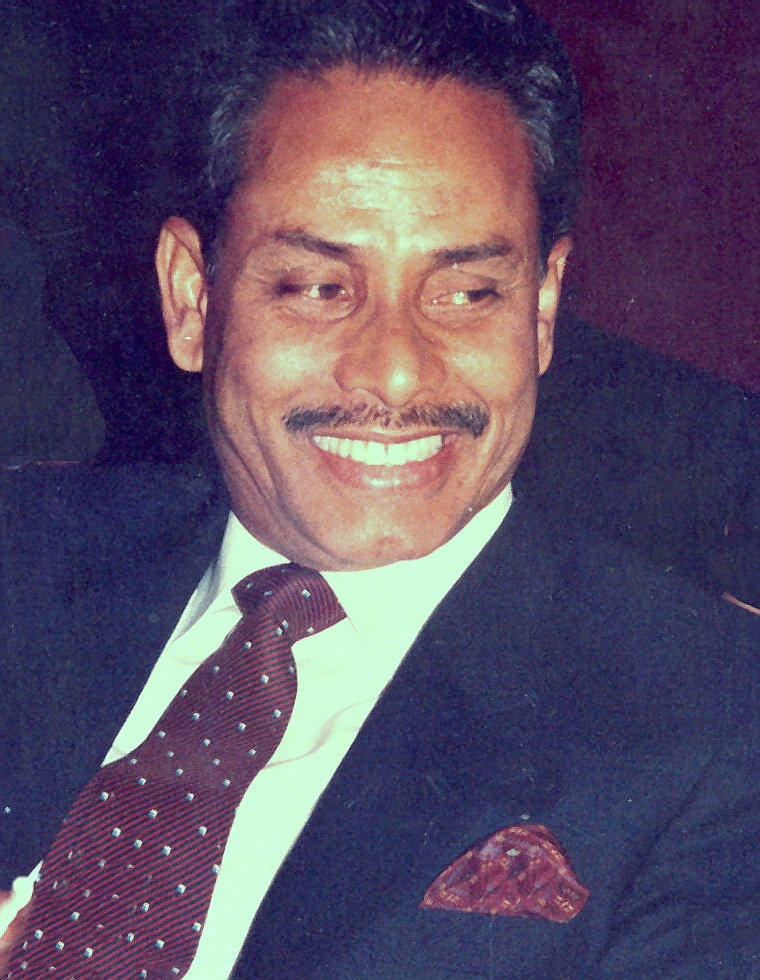
H. M.
Ershad

- President: Hussain Muhammad Ershad
- Prime Minister: Ataur Rahman Khan
- Chief Justice: F.K.M. Munim

== Demography ==
Demographic Indicators for Bangladesh in 1985
Population, total	90,764,180
Population density (per km^{2})	697.3
Population growth (annual %)	2.6%
Male to Female Ratio (every 100 Female)	106.8
Urban population (% of total)	17.5%
Birth rate, crude (per 1,000 people)	39.7
Death rate, crude (per 1,000 people)	12.5
Mortality rate, under 5 (per 1,000 live births)	174
Life expectancy at birth, total (years)	55.2
Fertility rate, total (births per woman)	5.5

== Climate ==
Climate data for Bangladesh in 1985
Month	Jan	Feb	Mar	Apr	May	Jun	Jul	Aug	Sep	Oct	Nov	Dec	Year
Daily mean °C (°F)	18.9 (66.0)	20.6 (69.1)	26.3 (79.3)	28.3 (82.9)	27.6 (81.7)	28.2 (82.8)	27.3 (81.1)	28.4 (83.1)	27.8 (82.0)	27. (81)	23.1 (73.6)	20.4 (68.7)	25.4 (77.7)
Average precipitation mm (inches)	7.6 (0.30)	12.3 (0.48)	91.5 (3.60)	113.8 (4.48)	310.4 (12.22)	504.2 (19.85)	429. (16.9)	327.9 (12.91)	311.3 (12.26)	102.1 (4.02)	34.4 (1.35)	5.8 (0.23)	2,250.3 (88.59)
Source: Climatic Research Unit (CRU) of University of East Anglia (UEA)

== Economy ==
Key Economic Indicators for Bangladesh in 1985
National Income
	Current US$	Current BDT	% of GDP
GDP	$22.3 billion	BDT579.2 billion	
GDP growth (annual %)	3.3%		
GDP per capita	$245.5	BDT6,382	
Agriculture, value added	$7.4 billion	BDT191.2 billion	33.0%
Industry, value added	$4.5 billion	BDT117.7 billion	20.3%
Services, etc., value added	$9.9 billion	BDT257.3 billion	44.4%
Balance of Payment
	Current US$	Current BDT	% of GDP
Current account balance	-$455.2 million		-2.0%
Imports of goods and services	$2,764.4 million	BDT74.4 billion	12.8%
Exports of goods and services	$1,237.3 million	BDT31.2 billion	5.4%
Foreign direct investment, net inflows	-$6.7 million		0.0%
Personal remittances, received	$502.5 million		2.3%
Total reserves (includes gold) at year end	$356.2 million		
Total reserves in months of imports	1.5		

Note: For 1985, the average official exchange rate for BDT was 27.99 per US$.

== Events ==
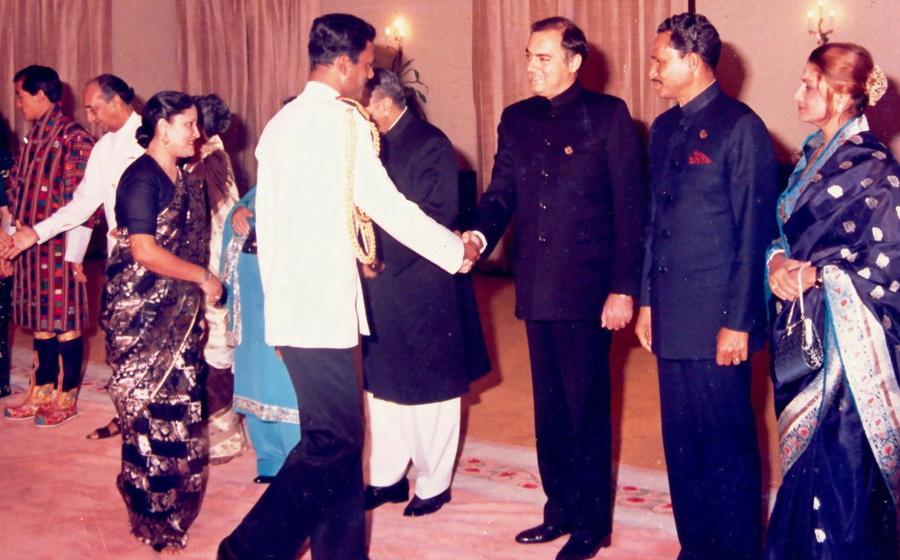
President H. M. Ershad's Reception of SAARC Heads of States in Dhaka.

- 13 February – Raufun Basunia, joint secretary of the Bangladesh Chhatra League, and the general secretary of its University of Dhaka branch, is shot dead during a clash between Chhatra Sangram Parishad and Chhatra Samaj, the ruling Jatiyo Party-backed student wing in front of Mohsin Hall at the University of Dhaka.
- 21 March – A referendum on military rule is held in order to confirm the military rule of Hussain Mohammed Ershad. The referendum asks voters "Do you support the policies of President Ershad, and do you want him to continue to run this administration until a civilian government is formed through elections?" The result is that 94.5% vote in favour, with a turnout of 72.2%. The opposition organises a general strike on the day of the referendum, and alleges that the results are fraudulent.
- 16 May – Voters turn out for the first of two phases of local government elections, the inaugural elections at the new upazila (sub-district) level.
- 20 May – The second phase of local government elections finishes filling 458 upazila council chairmanships from a field of 2,300 candidates.
- Heavy mortars are used in an exchange of fire between Bangladeshi and Indian forces on a disputed section of the border between the two nations.
- 22 November – The MOU between Bangladesh and India regarding Ganges water sharing is extended for three years.
- 8 December – The first SAARC summit is held in Dhaka, Bangladesh, on 6–8 December 1985 and was attended by the government representative and president of Bangladesh, Maldives, Pakistan, and Sri Lanka, the kings of Bhutan and Nepal, and the prime minister of India. They sign the SAARC Charter on 8 December 1985, thereby establishing the regional association, and established study groups on the problems of terrorism and drug trafficking, as well as planning a ministerial-level meeting about GATT, and a ministerial-level conference on increasing the participation of women at the regional level. The summit also agrees to establish a SAARC secretariat and adopted an official SAARC emblem.

=== Awards and recognitions ===
==== International recognition ====
- Zafrullah Chowdhury, the founder of Gonoshasthaya Kendra, was awarded the Ramon Magsaysay Award.

==== Independence Day Award ====
- Muhammad Ataul Gani Osmani was awarded posthumously for his contribution to social welfare.

==== Ekushey Padak ====
1. Abu Zafar Obaidullah (literature)
2. Gazi Shamsur Rahman (literature)
3. Abdullah Al-Muti (science)
4. Govinda Chandra Dev (education)
5. Mohammad Abdul Jabbar (education)
6. Kalim Sharafi (music)
7. Abed Hossain Khan (music)
8. Syed Jahangir (fine arts)

=== Sports ===
- South Asian (Federation) Games:
  - Bangladesh hosted the second South Asian Federation Games held in Dhaka from 20 to 26 December. With 9 golds, 17 silvers, and 38 bronzes, Bangladesh ended the tournament in the third position in overall points table.
- Domestic football:
  - Abahani KC won the 1985 Dhaka First Division League title while Brothers Union came out runner-up.
  - Abahani KC also won the Bangladesh Federation Cup title.

== Births ==
- 8 April – Masuma Rahman Nabila, actor
- 1 November – Enamul Haque, footballer

== Deaths ==
- 15 March – Aroj Ali Matubbar, author (b. 1900)
- 10 July – Ahsan Habib, poet (b. 1917)
- 17 July – Abdul Hady Talukdar, academic (b. 1905)
- 5 October – Abdus Sattar, former president (b. 1906)
- 30 October – Fazle Lohani, journalist and TV host (b. 1929)
- 4 December – Bijoy Sarkar, baul singer (b. 1903)

== See also ==
- 1980s in Bangladesh
- Timeline of Bangladeshi history
