= 1983 in Bangladesh =

- Centuries: 20th; 21st
- Decades: 1960s; 1970s; 1980s; 1990s; 2000s
- See also: Other events of 1983; List of years in Bangladesh

1983 (MCMLXXXIII) was a common year starting on Saturday of the Gregorian calendar, the 1983rd year of the Common Era (CE) and Anno Domini (AD) designations, the 983rd year of the 2nd millennium, the 83rd year of the 20th century, and the 4th year of the 1980s decade.

The year 1983 was the 12th year after the independence of Bangladesh. It was also the second year of the Government of Hussain Muhammad Ershad.

== Incumbents ==
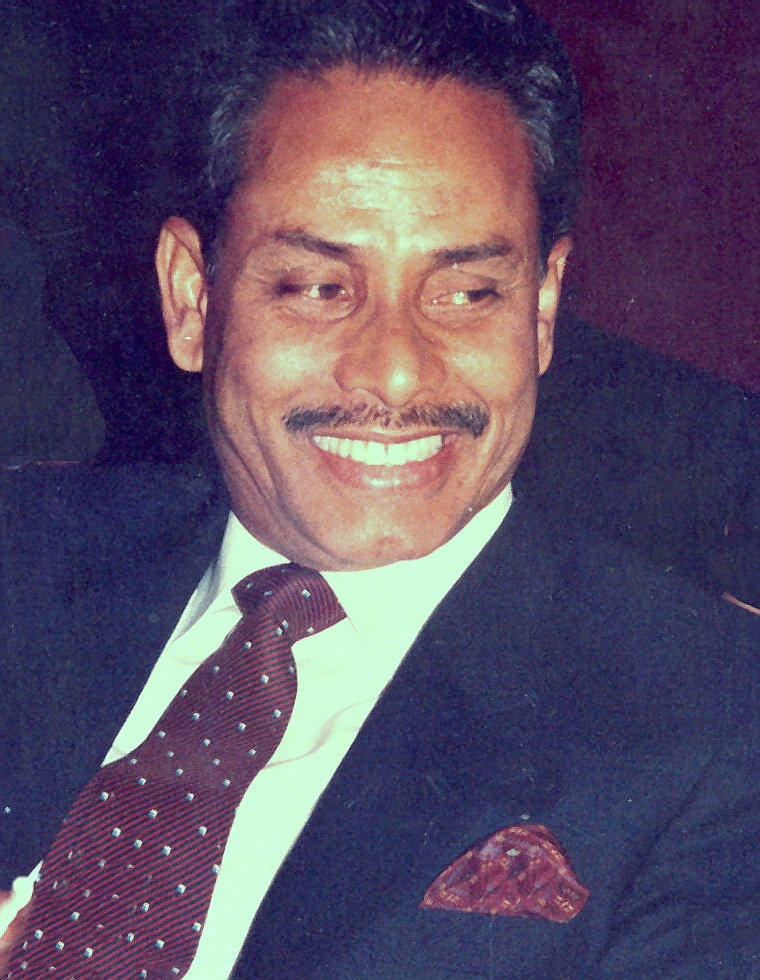
H. M.
Ershad

- President: A. F. M. Ahsanuddin Chowdhury (until 10 December), Hussain Muhammad Ershad (starting 11 December)
- Chief Justice: F.K.M. Munim

== Demography ==
Demographic Indicators for Bangladesh in 1983
Population, total	88,338,242
Population density (per km^{2})	678.6
Population growth (annual %)	2.7%
Male to Female Ratio (every 100 Female)	104.4
Urban population (% of total)	16.6%
Birth rate, crude (per 1,000 people)	41.8
Death rate, crude (per 1,000 people)	13.2
Mortality rate, under 5 (per 1,000 live births)	184.3
Life expectancy at birth, total (years)	54.7
Fertility rate, total (births per woman)	5.9

== Climate ==
Climate data for Bangladesh in 1983
Month	Jan	Feb	Mar	Apr	May	Jun	Jul	Aug	Sep	Oct	Nov	Dec	Year
Daily mean °C (°F)	18. (64)	19.7 (67.5)	24.7 (76.5)	26.9 (80.4)	27.5 (81.5)	28.9 (84.0)	28.7 (83.7)	28.2 (82.8)	28.2 (82.8)	27. (81)	23.9 (75.0)	18.9 (66.0)	25.1 (77.2)
Average precipitation mm (inches)	10. (0.4)	36.4 (1.43)	100.9 (3.97)	169.7 (6.68)	351. (13.8)	428.4 (16.87)	372.9 (14.68)	458.4 (18.05)	300.8 (11.84)	276.4 (10.88)	26. (1.0)	35.8 (1.41)	2,566.7 (101.05)
Source: Climatic Research Unit (CRU) of University of East Anglia (UEA)

== Economy ==
Key Economic Indicators for Bangladesh in 1983
National Income
	Current US$	Current BDT	% of GDP
GDP	$17.6 billion	BDT418.4 billion	
GDP growth (annual %)	3.9%		
GDP per capita	$204.4	BDT4,857	
Agriculture, value added	$5.5 billion	BDT129.9 billion	31.0%
Industry, value added	$3.7 billion	BDT87.3 billion	20.9%
Services, etc., value added	$8.1 billion	BDT191.6 billion	45.8%
Balance of Payment
	Current US$	Current BDT	% of GDP
Current account balance	-$45.8 million		-.3%
Imports of goods and services	$2,335.8 million	BDT61.6 billion	14.7%
Exports of goods and services	$939.9 million	BDT23.4 billion	5.6%
Foreign direct investment, net inflows	$0.4 million		0.0%
Personal remittances, received	$642.4 million		3.6%
Total reserves (includes gold) at year end	$545.9 million		
Total reserves in months of imports	2.7		

Note: For the year 1983 average official exchange rate for BDT was 24.62 per US$.

== Events ==
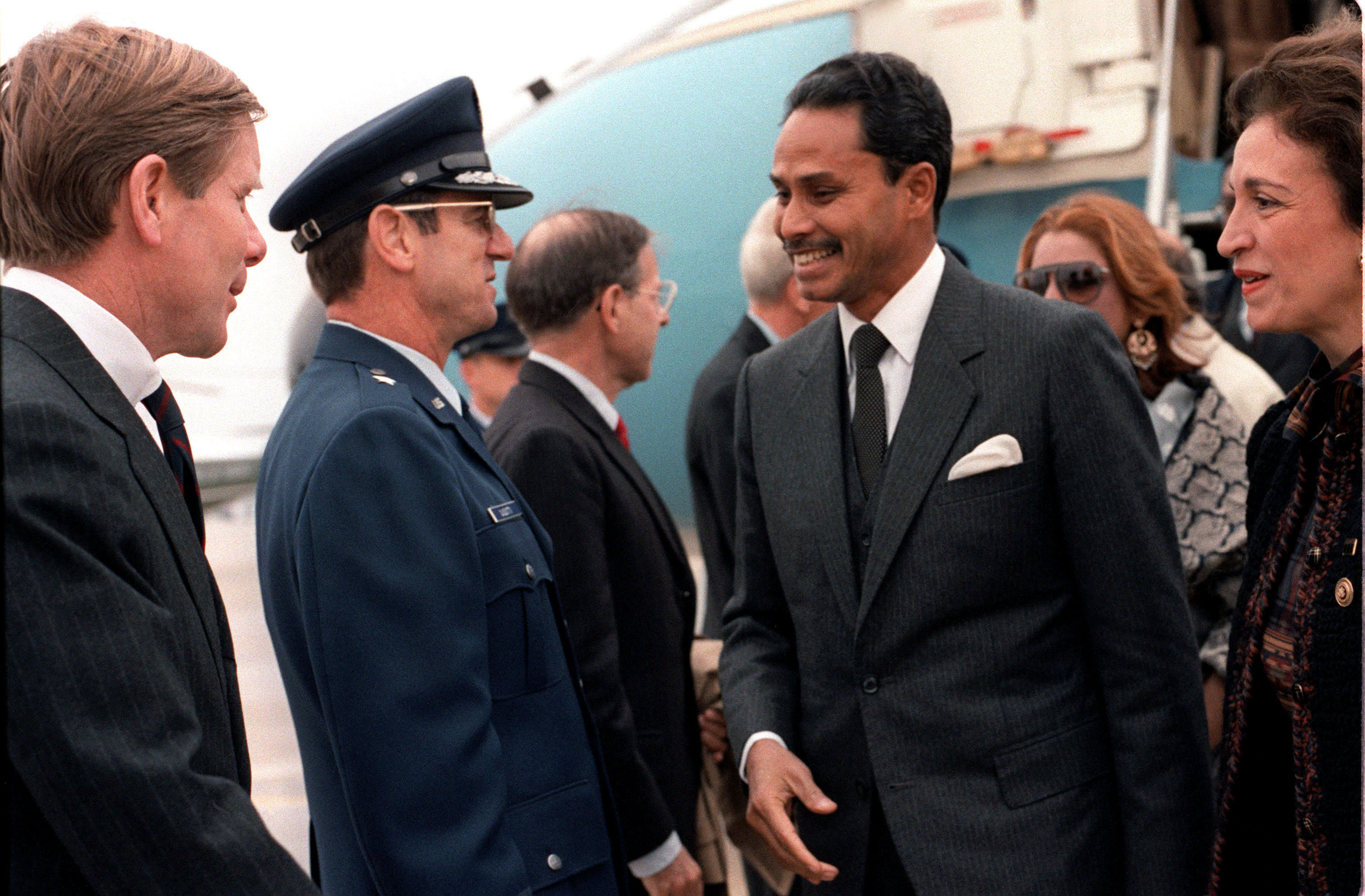
Ershad arrives for a state visit to USA (1983)

- 14 February - At least 10 people, mostly students, were killed when police opened fire on the procession against the education policy, popularly known at that time as “Majid Khan Education Policy.” The incident marked the beginning of the anti-autocracy movement against the military regime of H. M. Ershad.
- 18 February - Over 2,000 people, mostly Muslims of Bangladeshi origin, are massacred in Assam, India, during the Assam agitation.
- 20 September - The Bangladesh National Museum (Jatiya Jadughar) ordinance came into effect.
- 2 October - Grameen Bank was established through a government ordinance.
- 11 December - Hussain Muhammad Ershad takes charge as the President of Bangladesh.

=== Awards and recognitions ===
- Bangladeshi author Abdullah-Al-Muti won the UNESCO Kalinga Prize.

==== Independence Day Award ====
Recipients	Area	Note
Abdul Kadir	literature	
Muhammad Enamul Haque	education	posthumous
Serajul Huq	education	
Bangladesh Institute of Research and Rehabilitation for Diabetes, Endocrine and Metabolic Disorders (BIRDEM)	medical science	organization

==== Ekushey Padak ====
1. Shawkat Osman (literature)
2. Sanaul Huq (literature)
3. Abdul Gaffar Chowdhury (literature)
4. M A Kuddus (education)
5. Shahidullah Kaisar (journalism)
6. Syed Nur Uddin (journalism)
7. Abu Jafar Shamsuddin (literature)
8. Mohammad Kibria (painting)
9. Barin Mazumder (music)
10. Muhammad Mansuruddin

=== Sports ===
- Domestic football:
  - Abahani KC won 1983 Dhaka First Division League title while Mohammedan SC became runner-up.
  - Mohammedan SC won the title of Bangladesh Federation Cup.

== Births ==
- 11 April – Munem Wasif, photographer
- 28 May – Mamnun Hasan Emon, actor

== Deaths ==
- 26 January – Selina Banu, freedom fighter and social activist (b. 1926)
- 1 February – Dewan Abdur Rab Choudhury, politician (b. 1909)
- 12 February – Benajir Ahmed, author (b. 1903)
- 10 March – Atiquzzaman Khan, journalist (b. 1921)
- 4 May – Abul Fazal, author (b. 1903)
- 28 August – MA Wadud, language activist (b. 1925)
- 22 October – Khondakar Abdul Hamid, journalist (b. 1918)
- 10 November – Manabendra Narayan Larma, human rights activist (b. 1939)
- 28 August – MA Wadud, language activist (b. 1925)
- 31 December – Mohammad Sultan, language activist (b. 1926)

== See also ==
- 1980s in Bangladesh
- Timeline of Bangladeshi history
