= 1987 in Bangladesh =

- Centuries: 20th; 21st
- Decades: 1960s; 1970s; 1980s; 1990s; 2000s
- See also: Other events of 1987; List of years in Bangladesh

1987 (MCMLXXXVII) was a common year starting on Thursday of the Gregorian calendar, the 1987th year of the Common Era (CE) and Anno Domini (AD) designations, the 987th year of the 2nd millennium, the 87th year of the 20th century, and the 8th year of the 1980s decade.

The year 1987 was the 16th year after the independence of Bangladesh. It was also the sixth year of the government of Hussain Muhammad Ershad.

== Incumbents ==
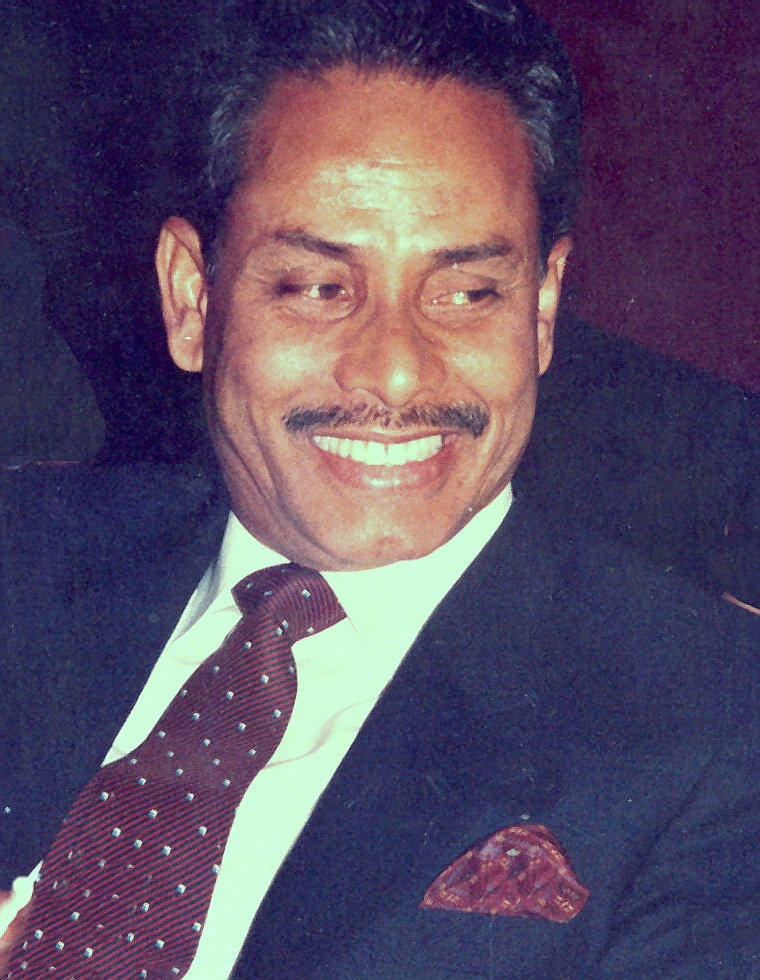
H. M.
Ershad

- President: Hussain Muhammad Ershad
- Prime Minister: Mizanur Rahman Chowdhury
- Vice President: A. K. M. Nurul Islam
- Chief Justice: F.K.M. Munim

== Demography ==
Demographic Indicators for Bangladesh in 1987
Population, total	95,671,159
Population density (per km^{2})	735.0
Population growth (annual %)	2.6%
Male to Female Ratio (every 100 Female)	106.8
Urban population (% of total)	18.4%
Birth rate, crude (per 1,000 people)	37.9
Death rate, crude (per 1,000 people)	11.7
Mortality rate, under 5 (per 1,000 live births)	162
Life expectancy at birth, total (years)	56.4
Fertility rate, total (births per woman)	5.1

== Climate ==
Climate data for Bangladesh in 1987
Month	Jan	Feb	Mar	Apr	May	Jun	Jul	Aug	Sep	Oct	Nov	Dec	Year
Daily mean °C (°F)	19. (66)	21.8 (71.2)	25. (77)	27.4 (81.3)	28.5 (83.3)	29.2 (84.6)	28. (82)	28.1 (82.6)	28.3 (82.9)	27.3 (81.1)	24.2 (75.6)	20.4 (68.7)	25.6 (78.1)
Average precipitation mm (inches)	3.6 (0.14)	12.8 (0.50)	51. (2.0)	200.2 (7.88)	150.5 (5.93)	486.6 (19.16)	713.1 (28.07)	647.3 (25.48)	331. (13.0)	119. (4.7)	31.2 (1.23)	14.5 (0.57)	2,760.8 (108.69)
Source: Climatic Research Unit (CRU) of University of East Anglia (UEA)

=== Cyclonic storm, tidal surge and floods ===
- At midnight on 5 June, a powerful tropical depression, previously formed in the Bay of Bengal, crossed Hatiya, Sandwip, Patuakhali, and Bhola region as a cyclonic storm accompanied by a tidal surge up to 6 feet (1.8 m) above normal, inundating low-lying islands.
- Heavy rains in the entire southern region caused flash floods in a few areas.
- The overall flood situation seriously deteriorated following heavy rains on 30 and 31 July and an influx of flood water from the northern region. The worst affected districts were Rangpur, Netrokona, Gaibandha, Naogaon, Kurigram, Jamalpur, Cox's Bazar, Chittagong, and Noakhali. About 3.5 million people were reported affected, and approximately 650,000 acres (260,000 ha) of crops were considerably damaged. Roads from the capital to the north-eastern region were disrupted due to overflowing water and the collapse of culverts.

== Economy ==
Key Economic Indicators for Bangladesh in 1987
National Income
	Current US$	Current BDT	% of GDP
GDP	$24.3 billion	BDT753.2 billion	
GDP growth (annual %)	3.8%		
GDP per capita	$254.0	BDT7,873	
Agriculture, value added	$7.9 billion	BDT246.0 billion	32.7%
Industry, value added	$4.8 billion	BDT147.6 billion	19.6%
Services, etc., value added	$11.1 billion	BDT342.7 billion	45.5%
Balance of Payment
	Current US$	Current BDT	% of GDP
Current account balance	-$237.1 million		-1.0%
Imports of goods and services	$2,939.8 million	BDT88.1 billion	11.7%
Exports of goods and services	$1,324.8 million	BDT37.6 billion	5.0%
Foreign direct investment, net inflows	$3.2 million		0.0%
Personal remittances, received	$747.8 million		3.1%
Total reserves (includes gold) at year end	$876.3 million		
Total reserves in months of imports	3.4		

Note: For 1987, the average official exchange rate for BDT was 30.95 per US$.

== Events ==
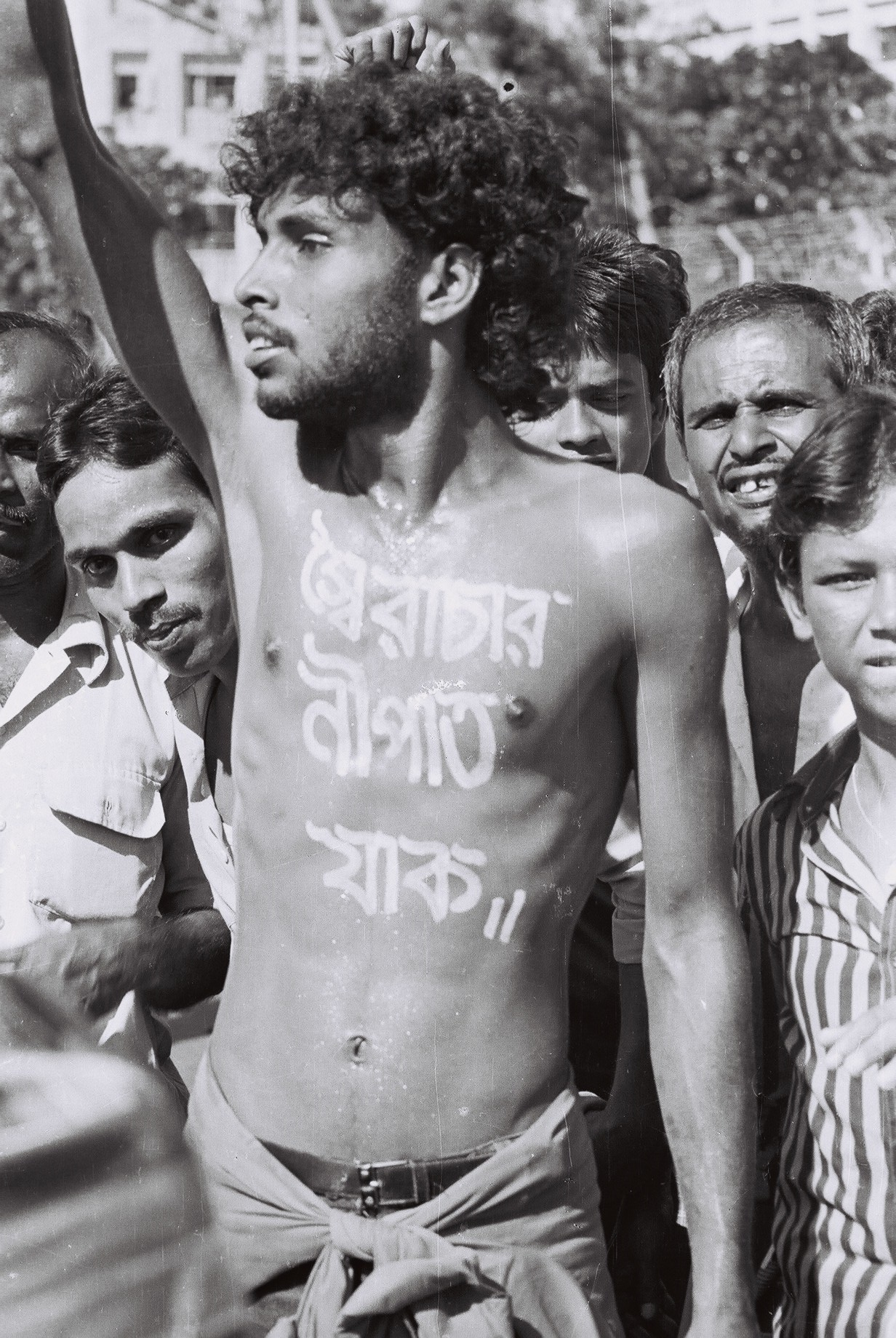
Activist Noor Hossain was killed by the police on 10 November 1987.

- 21 October – The Bangladesh Civil Service Administration Academy was established.
- 10 November – Bangladeshi activist Noor Hossain was killed by the Bangladesh Police while protesting against the rule of President Hussain Muhammad Ershad near zero point in Dhaka.
- 28 November – Hussain Muhammad Ershad declares a state of emergency and bans strikes. All educational institutes are declared closed until 4 December.
- 7 December – Hussain Muhammad Ershad dissolves parliament under the pressure of opposition.

=== Awards and recognitions ===
==== International recognition ====
- Richard William Timm was awarded the Ramon Magsaysay Award for his work in Bangladesh.

==== Independence Day Award ====
Recipients	Area	Note
M Hossain Ali	social work	
Syed Ali Ahsan	literature	
Professor Muhammad Yunus	rural development	
Armed Forces Institute of Pathology and Transfusion	medical science	organization

==== Ekushey Padak ====
1. Mohammad Moniruzzaman (literature)
2. Abu Hena Mustafa Kamal (music)
3. Anis Siddiky
4. Jahanara Arzu (literature)
5. Ahmad Shamsul Islam (education)
6. M. A. Naser (education)
7. Principal Abul Kashem (education)
8. Nurul Islam Patowary (journalism)
9. Ahmed Humayun (journalism)
10. Kanailal Shil (instrumental music)
11. Farida Parveen (music)
12. Syed Mainul Hossain (architecture)

=== Sports ===
- South Asian (Federation) Games:
  - Bangladesh participated in the third South Asian Federation Games held in Kolkata from 20 to 27 November. With 3 golds, 20 silvers, and 37 bronzes, Bangladesh ended the tournament in the fourth position in the overall points table.
- Domestic football:
  - Mohammedan SC won the 1987 Dhaka First Division League title while Abahani KC became runner-up.
  - Mohammedan SC also won the Bangladesh Federation Cup title.
- Chess:
  - Niaz Murshed became the first South Asian to secure the Grandmaster title.

== Births ==
- 24 March – Shakib Al Hasan, cricketer
- 4 April – Ahona Rahman, model and actor
- 9 June – Mushfiqur Rahim, cricketer
- 2 August – Abdul Baten Mojumdar Komol, footballer
- 5 October – Mozeza Ashraf Monalisa, model and actor
- 30 October – Junaid Siddique, cricketer
- 25 December – Jahid Hasan Ameli, footballer
- 25 December – Ashiqur Rahman, screenplay writer and director

== Deaths ==
- 20 February – AKM Samsuzzoha, politician (b. 1924)
- 3 March – S. A. Bari, politician (b. 1927)
- 6 May – Muhammadullah Hafezzi, politician (b. 1895)
- 5 July – Mohammad Farhad, politician (b. 1938)
- 2 August – Abu Sayeed Chowdhury, former president (b. 1921)
- 19 September – Muhammad Mansuruddin, author (b. 1904)
- 1 October – Abdur Rahim, Islamic scholar (b. 1918)
- 27 October – Anwara Bahar Chowdhury, social activist and author (b. 1919)
- 29 November – Mohammad Toaha, politician (b. 1922)
- 28 December – Happy Akhand, musician (b. 1960)

== See also ==
- 1980s in Bangladesh
- Timeline of Bangladeshi history
