= 1984 in Bangladesh =

- Centuries: 20th; 21st
- Decades: 1960s; 1970s; 1980s; 1990s; 2000s
- See also: Other events of 1984; List of years in Bangladesh

1984 (MCMLXXXIV) was a leap year starting on Sunday of the Gregorian calendar, the 1984th year of the Common Era (CE) and Anno Domini (AD) designations, the 984th year of the 2nd millennium, the 84th year of the 20th century, and the 5th year of the 1980s decade.

The year 1984 was the 13th year after the independence of Bangladesh. It was also the third year of the Government of Hussain Muhammad Ershad.

== Incumbents ==
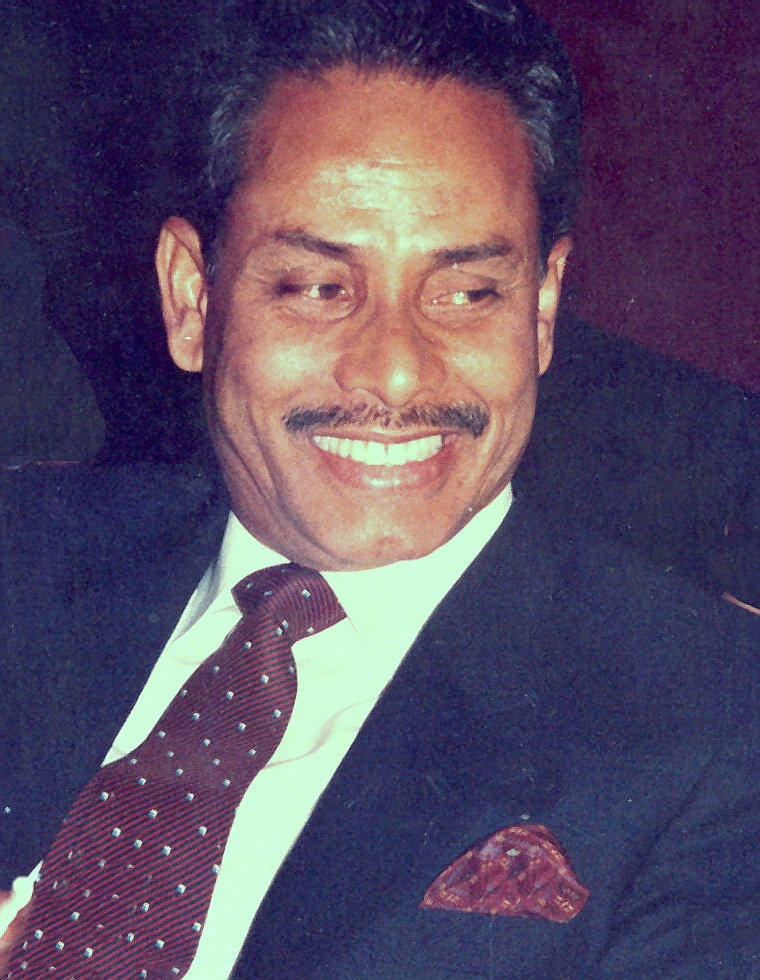
H. M.
Ershad

- President: Hussain Muhammad Ershad
- Prime Minister: Ataur Rahman Khan (starting 30 March)
- Chief Justice: F.K.M. Munim

== Demography ==
Demographic Indicators for Bangladesh in 1984
Population, total	88,416,529
Population density (per km^{2})	679.2
Population growth (annual %)	2.6%
Male to Female Ratio (every 100 Female)	106.7
Urban population (% of total)	17.1%
Birth rate, crude (per 1,000 people)	40.5
Death rate, crude (per 1,000 people)	13.0
Mortality rate, under 5 (per 1,000 live births)	179
Life expectancy at birth, total (years)	54.7
Fertility rate, total (births per woman)	5.7

== Climate ==
Climate data for Bangladesh in 1984
Month	Jan	Feb	Mar	Apr	May	Jun	Jul	Aug	Sep	Oct	Nov	Dec	Year
Daily mean °C (°F)	17.9 (64.2)	20. (68)	25.5 (77.9)	28.3 (82.9)	27.7 (81.9)	27.8 (82.0)	27.7 (81.9)	28.2 (82.8)	27.5 (81.5)	27.5 (81.5)	23. (73)	19.7 (67.5)	25.1 (77.2)
Average precipitation mm (inches)	14.1 (0.56)	5.1 (0.20)	8.7 (0.34)	216.4 (8.52)	507.8 (19.99)	587.2 (23.12)	635.9 (25.04)	420.7 (16.56)	374.7 (14.75)	130.5 (5.14)	4.4 (0.17)	6.4 (0.25)	2,911.8 (114.64)
Source: Climatic Research Unit (CRU) of University of East Anglia (UEA)

- Flood – Widespread heavy rains, during two weeks of 6–19 May, caused severe flooding in eastern part of the country.

== Economy ==
Key Economic Indicators for Bangladesh in 1984
National Income
	Current US$	Current BDT	% of GDP
GDP	$18.9 billion	BDT473.0 billion	
GDP growth (annual %)	4.8%		
GDP per capita	$214.0	BDT5,350	
Agriculture, value added	$6.6 billion	BDT164.1 billion	34.7%
Industry, value added	$4.1 billion	BDT101.4 billion	21.4%
Services, etc., value added	$7.9 billion	BDT197.0 billion	41.6%
Balance of Payment
	Current US$	Current BDT	% of GDP
Current account balance	-$477.7 million		-2.5%
Imports of goods and services	$2,818.0 million	BDT63.5 billion	13.4%
Exports of goods and services	$1,139.2 million	BDT16.1 billion	3.4%
Foreign direct investment, net inflows	-$0.6 million		0.0%
Personal remittances, received	$500.7 million		2.6%
Total reserves (includes gold) at year end	$408.1 million		
Total reserves in months of imports	1.7		

Note: For the year 1984 average official exchange rate for BDT was 25.35 per US$.

== Events ==
- 29 February – Shaheed Tajul Islam, a shifting worker at the Adamjee Jute Mills who served as the leader of the leader of the Adamjee Majdur (worker) Trade Union, was fatally injured by the armed cadres loyal to the autocratic regime of Hussain Muhammad Ershad.
- 5 August – a Biman Bangladesh Airlines flight from Chittagong crashed in the swamps near Zia International Airport. All 45 passengers and 4 crew of the Fokker F27 died, making it the worst aviation disaster of Bangladesh. The flight was piloted by Kaniz Fatema Roksana, the first woman commercial pilot of Bangladesh.
- Deposit Insurance was first introduced in August 1984 as a scheme in terms of The Bank Deposit Insurance Ordinance, 1984
- Sheikh Zayed Bin Sultan Al-Nahiyan of the United Arab Emirates (UAE) visited Bangladesh and offered to help orphans.

=== Awards and Recognitions ===
==== International Recognition ====
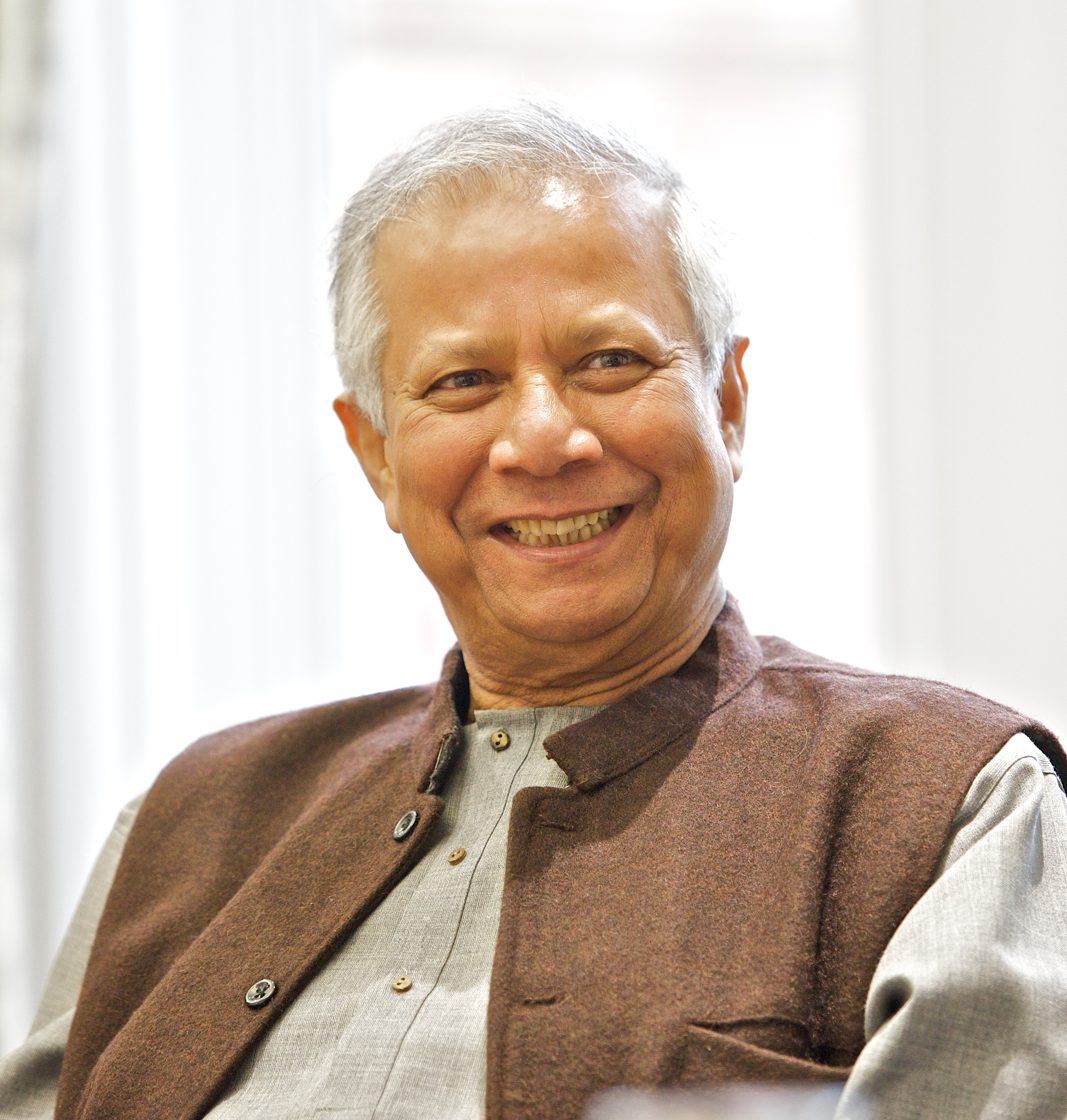
Muhammad Yunus

- Muhammad Yunus, the founder of Grameen Bank, was awarded Ramon Magsaysay Award.

==== Independence Day Award ====
Recipients	Area	Note
Dr. Muhammad Qudrat-i-Khuda		
Mohammad Nasiruddin	journalism	
Muhammad Mansuruddin	literature	
Shah Abul Hasnat Mohammad Ismail	literature	
Ustad Ayet Ali Khan	music	
Bulbul Choudhury	dance	posthumous
Didar Sarbik Gram Unnayan Samabay Somity	rural development	
Kumudini Welfare Trust	social service	organization

==== Ekushey Padak ====
1. Anisuzzaman (education)
2. Habibur Rahman (education)
3. Syed Waliullah (literature)
4. Hasan Hafizur Rahman (literature)
5. Syed Shamsul Huq (literature)
6. Rashid Karim (literature)
7. Sikandar Abu Zafar (journalism)
8. Mir Qasim Khan (music)
9. Sabina Yasmin (music)
10. Qayyum Chowdhury (fine arts)

=== Sports ===
- Olympics:
  - Bangladesh sent a delegation to compete in the Olympic Games for the first time at the 1984 Summer Olympics in Los Angeles, United States from 28 July to 12 August 1984. Bangladesh did not win any medals in the competition.
- South Asian (Federation) Games:
  - Bangladesh participated in the first ever South Asian Games held in Kathmandu 17–23 September. Bangladesh won 2 golds (in Men's Triple Jump and Men's 4 x 100 Metres Relay), 8 silvers and 13 bronzes to finish the tournament at the fifth position in overall points table.
- Domestic football:
  - Abahani KC won 1984 Dhaka First Division League title while Mohammedan SC came out runner-up.
  - Bangladesh Federation Cup final match between Mohammedan SC and Abahani KC was abandoned due to crowd riot.
- Cricket:
  - The First South-East Asian Cricket Tournament was held in Dhaka in January. Two teams from the host country were joined by teams from Singapore and Hong Kong. The Bangladesh national team won the trophy, and thus qualified for the 1986 Asia Cup in Sri Lanka.
  - Bangladesh team toured Kenya in February. Bangladesh drew the only 3-Day fixture, won a 2-day (over restricted) match, but won only 1 of the 5 limited over matches.

== Births ==
- Asaduzzaman Bablu, politician
- 1 January – Alok Kapali, cricketer
- 9 June – Nipun Akter, actor
- 3 July – Syed Rasel, cricketer
- 7 July – Mohammad Ashraful, cricketer

== Deaths ==
- 16 February – M. A. G. Osmani, the commander-in-chief of the Bangladesh Forces during the 1971 Bangladesh War of Independence (b. 1918)
- 10 March – Dino Shafeek, actor (b. 1930)
- 9 August – Khwaja Hassan Askari, Nawab of Dhaka (b. 1921)
- 19 December – Abdul Quadir, author (b. 1906)

== See also ==
- 1980s in Bangladesh
- Timeline of Bangladeshi history
