= 1988 in Bangladesh =

- Centuries: 20th; 21st
- Decades: 1960s; 1970s; 1980s; 1990s; 2000s
- See also: Other events of 1988; List of years in Bangladesh

1988 (MCMLXXXVIII) was a leap year starting on Friday of the Gregorian calendar, the 1988th year of the Common Era (CE) and Anno Domini (AD) designations, the 988th year of the 2nd millennium, the 88th year of the 20th century, and the 9th year of the 1980s decade.

The year 1988 was the 17th year after the independence of Bangladesh. It was also the seventh year of the government of Hussain Muhammad Ershad.

== Incumbents ==
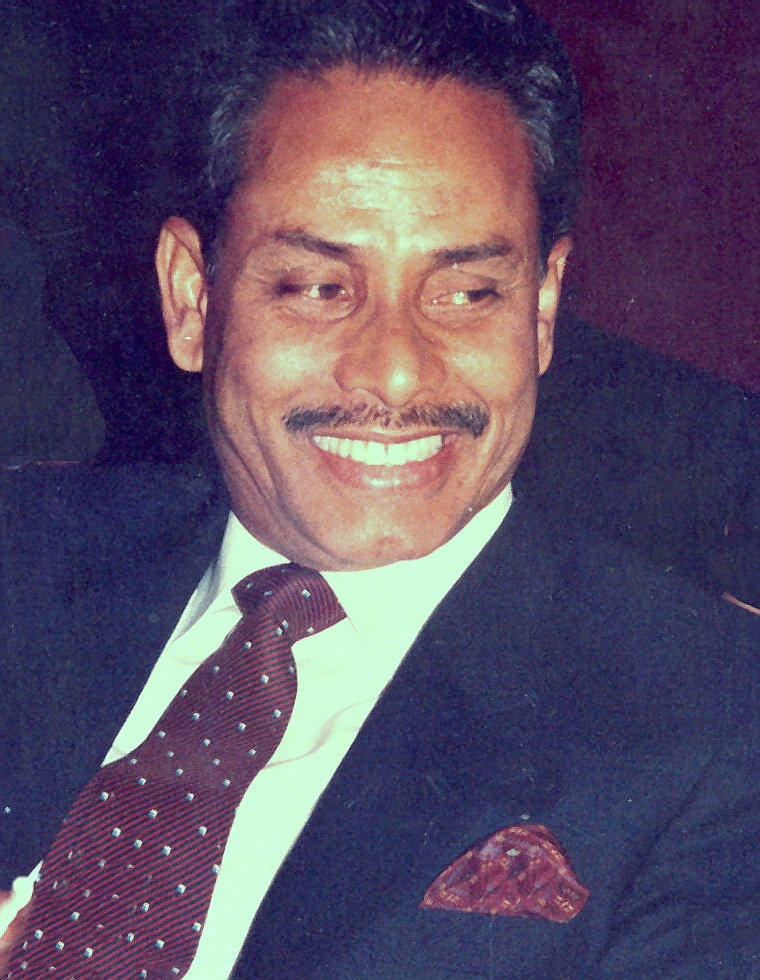
H. M.
Ershad

- President: Hussain Muhammad Ershad
- Prime Minister: Mizanur Rahman Chowdhury (until 27 March), Moudud Ahmed (starting 27 March)
- Vice President: A. K. M. Nurul Islam
- Chief Justice: F.K.M. Munim

== Demography ==
Demographic Indicators for Bangladesh in 1988
Population, total	98,186,350
Population density (per km^{2})	754.3
Population growth (annual %)	2.6%
Male to Female Ratio (every 100 Female)	106.7
Urban population (% of total)	18.9%
Birth rate, crude (per 1,000 people)	37.0
Death rate, crude (per 1,000 people)	11.2
Mortality rate, under 5 (per 1,000 live births)	156
Life expectancy at birth, total (years)	57.0
Fertility rate, total (births per woman)	4.9

== Climate ==
Climate data for Bangladesh in 1988
Month	Jan	Feb	Mar	Apr	May	Jun	Jul	Aug	Sep	Oct	Nov	Dec	Year
Daily mean °C (°F)	19.5 (67.1)	21.7 (71.1)	25.1 (77.2)	28.2 (82.8)	28. (82)	28. (82)	28.1 (82.6)	28.3 (82.9)	28.7 (83.7)	27.5 (81.5)	24.4 (75.9)	21.1 (70.0)	25.7 (78.3)
Average precipitation mm (inches)	1. (0.0)	30.7 (1.21)	71.2 (2.80)	211. (8.3)	417.6 (16.44)	535.6 (21.09)	574.9 (22.63)	523.7 (20.62)	300.7 (11.84)	160.5 (6.32)	92.4 (3.64)	16.4 (0.65)	2,935.9 (115.59)
Source: Climatic Research Unit (CRU) of University of East Anglia (UEA)

=== Flood ===
Bangladesh experienced heavy rain and flooding in the last two weeks of August. By the first week of September, the situation further deteriorated. Nearly 25 million people were rendered homeless, and the official death toll exceeded 500. About 30,000 km of roads were partially destroyed, and rice crop on 3.5 million hectares was destroyed or damaged. The situation started to improve in late September, but people rendered homeless due to the flood continued to struggle. Different countries, including Australia, Denmark, the United Kingdom, Japan, Ireland, Canada, Norway, Sweden, Belgium, India, Iraq, Kuwait, the Netherlands, Turkey, France, Pakistan, Qatar, KSA and the United States, as well as agencies including UNDRO, WHO, UNDP, EEC, Caritas, SCF-US, World Vision, LRCS, CCDB, Red Cross, and WFP joined the Bangladesh government in the relief operations.

=== Cyclone ===
The 1988 Bangladesh cyclone (designated as Tropical Cyclone 04B by the Joint Typhoon Warning Center) was one of the worst tropical cyclones in Bangladeshi history. Striking in November 1988, the tropical system exacerbated the catastrophic damage from what was then considered the worst floods in Bangladesh's history. The tropical cyclone originated from a disturbance that developed within the Strait of Malacca on 21 November. Tracking slowly westward, the initial tropical depression reached tropical storm status in the Andaman Sea. On 26 November, the storm reached an intensity equivalent to that of a modern-day severe cyclonic storm and subsequently turned northward. Gradually intensifying as it had previously, the tropical cyclone reached peak intensity with winds of 125 mph (200 km/h) as it was making landfall near the Bangladesh-West Bengal border on 29 November. Although the storm retained strong winds well inland, it was last monitored over central Bangladesh as a moderate cyclonic storm-equivalent on 30 November.

The brunt of the tropical cyclone's damage was inflicted upon coastal areas of Bangladesh and West Bengal. A total of 6,240 people were killed as a result of the storm, with 5,708 in Bangladesh and 538 in West Bengal. Many of the deaths were a result of the destruction of homes or electrocution after strong winds toppled power poles across the region. Along the coast of Bangladesh, a strong storm surge caused heavy infrastructure damage and contributed to wiping out an estimated 70% of all harvestable Bangladeshi crops, with an estimated 200,000 tonnes (220,000 tons) of crops being lost. Widespread power outages cut telecommunications across Bangladesh; in Dhaka, Bangladesh's capital city, debris-laden streets paralyzed traffic while electrical outages caused water shortages.

== Economy ==
Key Economic Indicators for Bangladesh in 1988
National Income
	Current US$	Current BDT	% of GDP
GDP	$26.6 billion	BDT829.3 billion	
GDP growth (annual %)	2.4%		
GDP per capita	$270.7	BDT8,446	
Agriculture, value added	$8.3 billion	BDT259.7 billion	31.3%
Industry, value added	$5.3 billion	BDT165.3 billion	19.9%
Services, etc., value added	$12.3 billion	BDT384.7 billion	46.4%
Balance of Payment
	Current US$	Current BDT	% of GDP
Current account balance	-$272.8 million		-1.0%
Imports of goods and services	$3,347.5 million	BDT101.6 billion	12.2%
Exports of goods and services	$1,568.7 million	BDT45.0 billion	5.4%
Foreign direct investment, net inflows	$1.8 million		0.0%
Personal remittances, received	$763.6 million		2.9%
Total reserves (includes gold) at year end	$1,076.5 million		
Total reserves in months of imports	3.7		

Note: For 1988, the average official exchange rate for BDT was 31.73 per US$.

== Events ==
- 24 January – Activists of the Awami League, rallying in the streets of Chittagong, are attacked by the police. Chittagong Metropolitan Police Commissioner Mirza Rakibul Huda orders the police to open fire on the rally, which leaves at least 24 people dead.
- 3 March – General election is held, Jatiya Party gets overwhelming majority with 68.44% of the votes.
- 2 December – The worst cyclone for 20 years strikes Bangladesh. The cyclone eventually leaves 5 million homeless and thousands dead.

=== Awards and recognitions ===
==== International recognition ====
- Mohammad Yeasin, the promoter of Deedar Comprehensive Village Development Cooperative Society, was awarded the Ramon Magsaysay Award.

==== Independence Day Award ====
Recipients	Area	Note
Aminul Islam	fine arts	
Md. Nurul Alam	social work	posthumous

==== Ekushey Padak ====
1. Bonde Ali Miah (literature)
2. Ashraf Siddiqui (literature)
3. Fazal Shahabuddin (literature)
4. Anwar Hossain (drama)
5. Sudhin Das (music)

=== Sports ===
- Olympics:
  - Bangladesh sent a delegation to compete in the 1988 Summer Olympics in Seoul, South Korea. Bangladesh did not win any medals in the competition.
- Domestic football:
  - Mohammedan SC won the 1988–89 Dhaka First Division League title while Abahani KC came out runner-up.
  - Abahani KC won the Bangladesh Federation Cup.
- Cricket:
  - The Third Asia Cup (also known as the Wills Asia Cup) was held in Bangladesh between 26 October and 4 November. Four teams took part in the tournament: India, Pakistan, Sri Lanka, and the host nation Bangladesh. The matches were the first-ever List A-classified being played in Bangladesh, then an Associate Member of the International Cricket Council (ICC), their opponents all being Full Members. Bangladesh lost all 3 of their matches in the tournament.

== Births ==
- 7 January - Shakil Ahmed, footballer
- 18 January - Sajidul Islam, cricketer
- 9 March - Shamima Sultana, cricketer
- 24 March - Sharmin Ratna, sports shooter
- 1 May – Ashraful Islam Rana, footballer
- 15 June – Mohamed Zahid Hossain, footballer
- 16 June - Shohely Akhter, cricketer
- 10 August - Nasirul Islam Nasir, footballer
- 12 August - Moinuddin Rubel, cricketer
- 12 October - Moushumi Hamid, actress
- 1 November – Mohammad Shahid, cricketer
- 11 November - Chamely Khatun, cricketer
- 12 November - Khan Muhammad Saifullah Al Mehdi, politician
- 21 November - Suhrawadi Shuvo, cricketer
- 1 December - Saqlain Sajib, cricketer
- 12 December – Mamunul Islam, footballer
- 30 December - Dolar Mahmud, cricketer

== Deaths ==
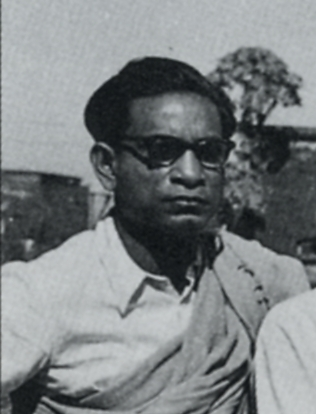
"Potua" Quamrul Hassan (1921–1988)

- 2 February – Quamrul Hassan, painter (b. 1921)
- 24 August – Abu Jafar Shamsuddin, author (b. 1918)
- 4 December - Abdul Hye Mashreki, poet (b. 1919)
- 13 December - Tafazzal Ali, lawyer (b. 1906)

== See also ==
- 1980s in Bangladesh
- Timeline of Bangladeshi history
