= 1986 in Bangladesh =

- Centuries: 20th; 21st
- Decades: 1960s; 1970s; 1980s; 1990s; 2000s
- See also: Other events of 1986; List of years in Bangladesh

1986 (MCMLXXXVI) was a common year starting on Wednesday of the Gregorian calendar, the 1986th year of the Common Era (CE) and Anno Domini (AD) designations, the 986th year of the 2nd millennium, the 86th year of the 20th century, and the 7th year of the 1980s decade.

The year 1986 was the 15th year after the independence of Bangladesh. It was also the fifth year of the Government of Hussain Muhammad Ershad.

== Incumbents ==
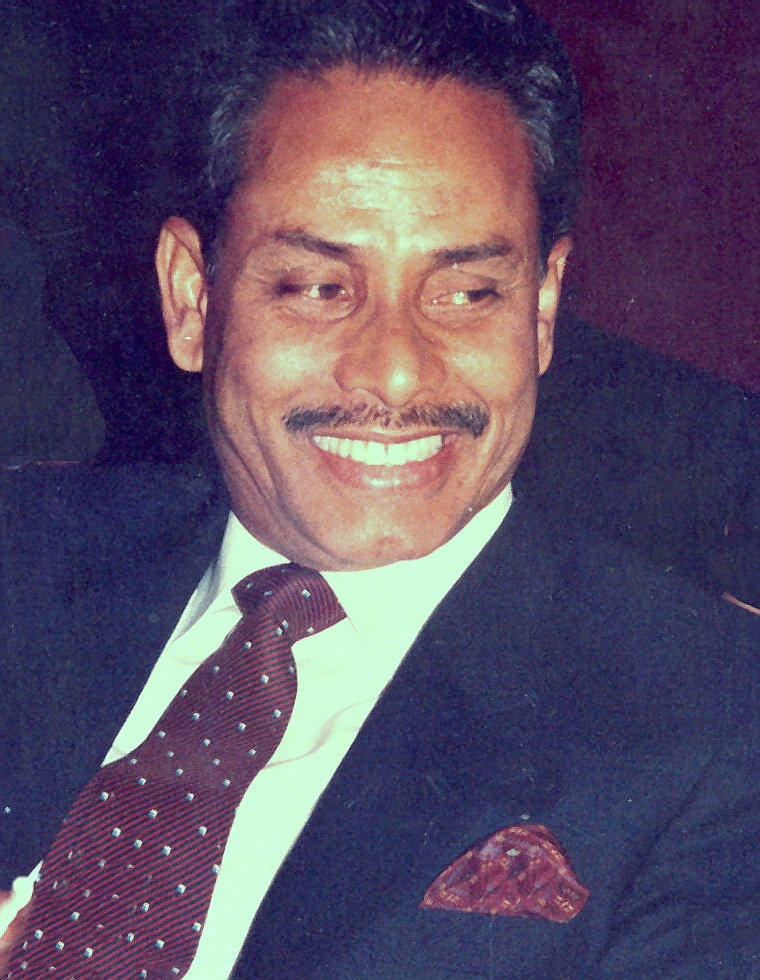
H. M.
Ershad

- President: Hussain Muhammad Ershad
- Prime Minister: Ataur Rahman Khan (until 9 July), Mizanur Rahman Chowdhury (starting 9 July)
- Vice President: A. K. M. Nurul Islam (starting 30 November)
- Chief Justice: F.K.M. Munim

== Demography ==
Demographic Indicators for Bangladesh in 1986
Population, total	93,187,593
Population density (per km^{2})	715.9
Population growth (annual %)	2.6%
Male to Female Ratio (every 100 Female)	106.8
Urban population (% of total)	17.9%
Birth rate, crude (per 1,000 people)	38.8
Death rate, crude (per 1,000 people)	12.1
Mortality rate, under 5 (per 1,000 live births)	168
Life expectancy at birth, total (years)	55.8
Fertility rate, total (births per woman)	5.3

== Climate ==
Climate data for Bangladesh in 1986
Month	Jan	Feb	Mar	Apr	May	Jun	Jul	Aug	Sep	Oct	Nov	Dec	Year
Daily mean °C (°F)	18.9 (66.0)	21.2 (70.2)	25.6 (78.1)	27. (81)	27.5 (81.5)	28.9 (84.0)	27.8 (82.0)	28.5 (83.3)	27.4 (81.3)	26.2 (79.2)	23.8 (74.8)	20.1 (68.2)	25.3 (77.5)
Average precipitation mm (inches)	4.9 (0.19)	1.9 (0.07)	22.5 (0.89)	181.8 (7.16)	192.3 (7.57)	314.6 (12.39)	578.2 (22.76)	319.5 (12.58)	440.3 (17.33)	278.2 (10.95)	125.3 (4.93)	8.3 (0.33)	2,467.7 (97.15)
Source: Climatic Research Unit (CRU) of University of East Anglia (UEA)

== Economy ==
Key Economic Indicators for Bangladesh in 1986
National Income
	Current US$	Current BDT	% of GDP
GDP	$21.8 billion	BDT653.2 billion	
GDP growth (annual %)	4.2%		
GDP per capita	$233.7	BDT7,010	
Agriculture, value added	$7.0 billion	BDT211.4 billion	32.4%
Industry, value added	$4.4 billion	BDT133.1 billion	20.4%
Services, etc., value added	$9.8 billion	BDT294.5 billion	45.1%
Balance of Payment
	Current US$	Current BDT	% of GDP
Current account balance	-$625.2 million		-2.9%
Imports of goods and services	$2,803.7 million	BDT77.3 billion	11.8%
Exports of goods and services	$1,095.0 million	BDT33.9 billion	5.2%
Foreign direct investment, net inflows	$2.4 million		0.0%
Personal remittances, received	$576.3 million		2.6%
Total reserves (includes gold) at year end	$434.9 million		
Total reserves in months of imports	1.8		

Note: For the year 1986 average official exchange rate for BDT was 30.41 per US$.

== Events ==
- 1 January – President H. M. Ershad founded his own political party named Jatiya Party.
- 14 April – Bangladesh Krira Shikkha Protishtan was inaugurated.
- 14 April – Hailstones weighing 1 kilogram (2.2 lb) fall on Gopalganj District, Bangladesh, killing 92.
- 7 May – The Third National Parliamentary Elections were held. The result was a victory for the Jatiya Party, which won 153 of the 300 seats. Voter turnout was 61.1%. Bangladesh Nationalist Party, the winner of the previous elections, boycotted the election.
- 25 May – 1986 Bangladesh maritime disaster, double-decked ferry Shamia capsizes in the Meghna River, southern Barisal, Bangladesh, killing at least 600.
- 25 August – Shahjalal University of Science and Technology was established.
- 15 October – Presidential elections were held. The result was a victory for Hussain Muhammad Ershad, who won 84.1% of the vote. Turnout was 54.9%.

=== Awards and Recognitions ===
==== International Recognition ====
- Bangladeshi diplomat Humayun Rashid Choudhury was elected president of the 41st session of the UN General Assembly in 1986.

==== Independence Day Award ====
Recipients	Area	Note
Bangladesh Academy for Rural Development, Comilla	rural development	organization
Mafizuddin Ahmed	science and technology	
Mosharraf Hossain	sports	

==== Ekushey Padak ====
1. Alauddin Al Azad (literature)
2. Al Mahmud (literature)
3. Satyen Sen
4. Askar Ibne Shaikh (literature)
5. Munshi Raisuddin (music)
6. Mobarak Hossain Khan (music)
7. Dhir Ali Miah (music)

=== Sports ===
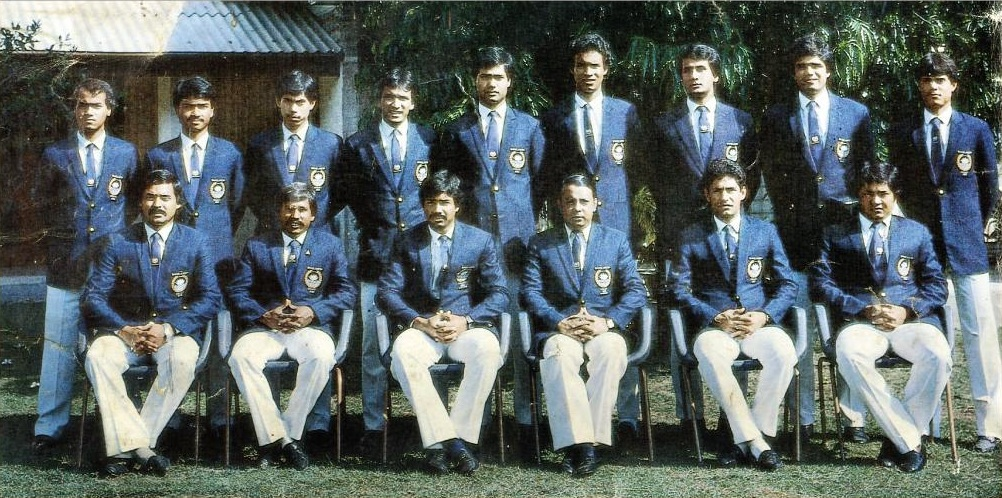
Bangladesh made its full debut in international cricket in the 1986 Asia Cup.

- Asian Games:
  - Bangladesh participated in the 1986 Asian Games held in Seoul, South Korea from 20 September to 5 October 1986. Mosharraf Hossain won bronze medal in boxing Light heavyweight (81 kg) event.
- Domestic football:
  - Mohammedan SC won 1986 Dhaka First Division League title while Abahani KC became runner-up.
  - Abahani KC also won Bangladesh Federation Cup title.
- Cricket:
  - Bangladesh participated in 1986 Asia Cup Held in Sri Lanka in March–April. On 31 March 1986, Bangladesh played their first One Day International against a full member of the ICC; Captained by Gazi Ashraf, Bangladesh were dismissed for 94 and Pakistan reached their target for victory with seven wickets in hand. They lost their second ODI, which was against Sri Lanka, finishing last in the three-team tournament.

== Births ==
- 15 January – Doli Akhter, swimmer
- 4 February – Mahmudullah, cricketer
- 20 May – Amaan Reza, actor
- 27 June – Ziaul Faruq Apurba, actor
- 20 October – Robiul Islam, cricketer
- 5 December – Enamul Haque Jr, cricketer

== Deaths ==
- 10 May – Q. M. Rahman, government official (b. 1906)
- 28 June – Haji Mohammad Danesh, politician (b. 1900)
- 22 December – Sarder Jayenuddin, author (b. 1918)

== See also ==
- 1980s in Bangladesh
- Timeline of Bangladeshi history
