= Shishir Bhattacharjee =

Bangladeshi artist

- শিশির ভট্টাচার্য্য
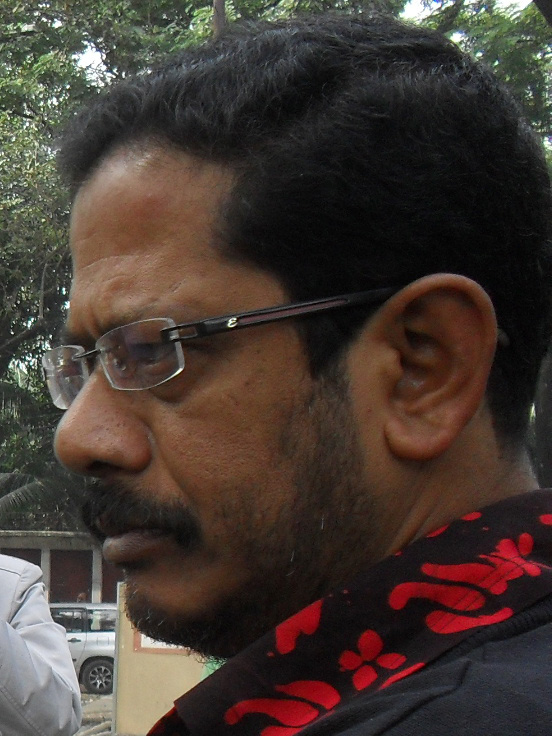
- Bhattacharjee in 2011
- Born: 1960 (age 65–66); Thakurgaon
- Education: University of Dhaka; Maharaja Sayajirao University of Baroda
- Occupations: Academic, cartoonist

Signature
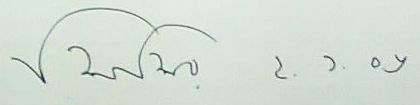

Shishir Bhattacharjee (born 1960) is a Bangladeshi artist. His paintings, critical of the political establishment but always in a satirical fashion, were first seen in the 1980s. His political cartoons appear regularly in daily newspapers in Bangladesh. During the past couple of years, he has produced paintings that appropriate images from Bengali film posters, altered to serve his social and political messages.

== Education ==
Shishir received a Bachelor of Fine Art from the Institute of Fine Art, Dhaka University, Bangladesh, in 1983. He received his master's degree in Painting from the Faculty of Fine Arts, Maharaja Sayajirao University of Baroda in 1987.

== Career ==
Shishir is a political cartoonist for Prothom Alo, the largest-circulation Bengali-language newspaper in Bangladesh, and an associate professor in the Faculty of Fine Arts at the University of Dhaka. His caricature style has influenced a new generation of illustrators.

He led the influential genre-breaking group of alternative artists "Shomoy" that appeared in the 1980s, and were considered the "third wave" of Bangladesh artists. He was a vociferous and early critic of the Ershad military junta, which frequently placed him at odds with the authorities. His scathing critique of the Jamaat e Islami and 1971 war criminals made him a hated figure for the right-wing forces. Shishir is a major influence on politically motivated Bangladeshi artists.

In 2002, Bhattacharjee released an album of cartoons.

== Exhibitions ==
Shishir Bhattacharjee presented his first solo exhibition in 1994 in Chittagong, Bangladesh, and his second solo in 2000 in Dhaka, Bangladesh. He took part in a group exhibition under the ArtSouthAsia programme in Manchester, England, in 2002. He participated in a group exhibition in Pakistan. A month-long exhibition of Bhattacharjee took place in September 2007 in Japan. He was the only Bangladeshi artist in the 2007 show "System Error: War Is A Force That Gives Us Meaning" at Palazzo Papesse in Siena, co-curated by Bangladeshi artist and writer Naeem Mohaiemen. In March 2008, he had a group Exhibition in New York. In 2008, he had his first Bangladesh solo exhibition in seven years, at Gallery Kaya, one of the newer galleries. In 2013 he had a solo exhibition at Dhaka Art Center. In September 2025, Bhattacharjee held a solo drawing exhibition at Kalakendra in Lalmatia, Dhaka, where his works explored themes of natural catastrophe, human relationships, and political hypocrisy.

== Teaching career ==
Shishir has been teaching at the Institute of Fine Arts since 1989 at the University of Dhaka. As being an educator he has been invited as guest teacher at Slade School of Art in London. Under his teaching several students got reputation nationally and internationally including Firoz Mahmud and few others.
