= Anwarul Huq =

Anwarul Haq
- Born: 18 July 1918
- Died: November 18, 1981 (aged 63)
- Known for: Fine arts
- Awards: Ekushey Padak

Anwarul Huq is a Bangladeshi sculptor posthumously awarded the Independence Award, the highest civilian award of Bangladesh, in 1982.

== Biography ==
Huq was born in 1918 in Kampala, Uganda.

He was one of the founders of the Faculty of Fine Arts, University of Dhaka. He worked at the University of Dhaka till 1977. He completed his BFA at the Government College of Art & Craft in 1941.

Huq died in 1981 in Dhaka.
