= Paradise Group of Industries =

Bangladeshi company

- Company type: Private
- Industry: Electrical cable, Light Engineering, Textile, Real-estate, Telecom (ISP), Technology (IEG and ISP), Electrical Accessories, Insurance, Education and Hospitality
- Founded: MD Mosharraf Hossain
- Headquarters: Fatullah, Narayanganj, Bangladesh
- Revenue: $200 million
- Number of employees: 6000
- Website: www.paradisecables.com

Paradise Group of Industries (PGI) is a Bangladeshi conglomerate. The company was founded by Mosharraf Hossain in 1983. The industries under this conglomerate include light engineering, electrical cable, textile, real estate, etc. Its main corporate units are Paradise Cable Limited (PCL), SBS Cables Ltd and Paradise Spinning Mills Ltd. Paradise Cables is the leading manufacturer of all types of wires, cables and conductors in Bangladesh. The group started its business with textiles and trading, and later diversified into wire and cable manufacturing.

== List of companies ==
- Paradise Cables Limited
- SBS Cables Ltd.
- Paradise Spinning Mills Limited
- Paradise Fashions (Pvt) Ltd
- Paradise Merchandising Limited
- Paradise Marketing Limited
- Saleha Wire Limited
- Paradise Metallurgical Complex Ltd.
- Paradise Properties Limited
- Paradise Electric and Electronics Ltd
