= Kazi Mohammad Mosharraf Hossain =

Bangladeshi social worker

Kazi Mohammad Mosharraf Hossain is a Bangladeshi social worker posthumously awarded the Independence Award, the highest civilian award of Bangladesh, in 1982.

Hossain was the deputy secretary of Industries of East Pakistan in 1963.
