= Kanailal Shil =

- Born: 20 September 1895; Kairal village, Nagarkanda Upazila, Faridpur District, Bengal Presidency, British India
- Died: 1976 (aged 80–81)

Kanailal Shil (1895–1976) was a Bangladeshi dotara player, songwriter, composer, and collector of folk songs. He was awarded Ekushey Padak in 1987 by the Government of Bangladesh.

== Early life and education ==
Shil was born in Kairal village, Nagarkanda Upazila, Faridpur District. His father was Ananda Chandra Shil.

== Career ==
Poet Jasimuddin took Shil to Calcutta in 1930. At Kolkata he met Abbasuddin Ahmed, who helped him to join the Gramophone Company. He played the dotara with the songs of Kazi Nazrul Islam.

In 1947 he moved to Dhaka. He then joined the Dhaka centre of Radio Pakistan and worked there until his death.
