= Jamal Uddin Ahmed (artist) =

Bangladeshi artist and professor

- জামাল উদ্দিন আহমদ
- Born: 1955 (age 70–71); Dhaka
- Education: University of Dhaka; University of Tsukuba
- Occupations: artist, professor
- Awards: Ekushey Padak (2019)

Jamal Uddin Ahmed (born 1955) is a Bangladeshi artist and professor. In recognition of his contribution to fine arts, the government of Bangladesh awarded him the country's second highest civilian award Ekushey Padak in 2019.

== Early life ==
Ahmed was born in Dhaka of the then East Pakistan (now Bangladesh) in 1955. He completed his Secondary School Certificate from Government Laboratory High School in 1972 and Higher Secondary School Certificate in 1974. He graduated from the Faculty of Fine Arts, University of Dhaka in 1978. From 1980 to 1982, he did a two years research course at Academy of Fine Arts in Warsaw. In 1982, he moved to Japan and studied oil painting at University of Tsukuba until 1984. He earned his post graduation degree from the same university in 1986.

== Career ==
Ahmed was a visiting teacher and artist in residence in the Art and Design Department at the North Carolina State University in 1995. He is currently a professor at the Department of Drawing & Painting of University of Dhaka under Faculty of Fine Art.

As of 2019, Ahmed is the current president of Bangladesh Charushilpi Sangsad.

== Awards and recognition ==
- 2nd Acrylic Award, 17th International Miniature Art Show, Florida, USA. (1992)
- 3rd prize at Seascapes in the 7th International Miniature Art Show, Georgia Miniature Art Society, Georgia, USA. (1992)
- 2nd Acrylic Award, 18th International Miniature Art Show, Georgia Miniature Art Society, Georgia, USA. (1993)
- Gold Medal, 11th National Art Exhibition at Shilpakala Academy, Dhaka (1994)
- 2nd prize in Drawing at Saju Art Gallery, Dhaka (1999)
- Saju Art Gallery Award for Painting (2000)
- 2nd Best prize at Artist's Association Exhibition (2000)
- Best prize, 14th National Art Exhibition at Shilpakala Academy (2000)
- Honorable Mention, 10th Asian Art Biennale (2001)
- Ekushey Padak (2019)
