= Shah Abul Hasnat Mohammad Ismail =

Shah Abul Hasnat Mohammad Ismail is a Bangladeshi writer posthumously awarded the Independence Award, the highest civilian award of Bangladesh, in 1984. He wrote a well-known book on sex education in Bengali.
