= Shahidul Amin =

- Born: c. 1936
- Died: 6 August 2017 (aged 81)
- Occupations: Director, Playwright, Actor, Screenplay Writer

Shahidul Amin (c. 1936 – 6 August 2017) was a Bangladeshi director, playwright, actor and screenplay writer.

== Career ==
Amin directed Ramer Sumoti was released in 1985. He was the screenplay writer of that film too. This film won National Film Award in two categories. This film was the first film of Sadek Bachchu.

Amin also directed films like Ruper Rani Chorer Raja and Rajkumari Chandraban. These films are selected for preservation in Bangladesh Film Archive. He also involved in acting in films and dramas.

== Death ==
Amin died on 6 August 2017 at the age of 81.

== Selected filmography ==
=== Director ===
- Rajkumari Chandraban (1970)
- Rajkumari Chandraban (1979)
- Ruper Rani Chorer Raja (1979)
- Shahzadi Gulbahar (1980)
- Ramer Sumati (1985)
- Mayamrigo
- Bibad

=== Actor ===
- Hiramon
- Deyal
- Matir Kole
- Kokhono Asheni
- Shonkhonil Karagar

=== Screenplay Writer ===
- Ramer Sumoti
