= Ahsan Habib (poet) =

Bangladeshi poet

- Born: 2 February 1917; Shankar Pasha, Bengal Presidency, British India
- Died: 10 July 1985 (aged 68); Dhaka, Bangladesh
- Citizenship: Bangladesh
- Occupations: Writer, poet
- Years active: 1934–1985
- Known for: Ashay Basati, Megh Bale Chaitre Jabo, Aranya Nilima, Ranikhaler Sanko
- Awards: Bangla Academy Literary Award (1961); Ekushey Padak (1978)

Ahsan Habib (2 February 1917 – 10 July 1985) was a Bangladeshi poet and literary figure in Bengali culture. Before the India-Pakistan partition, he worked on several literary magazines: Takbir, Bulbul (1937–38) and The Saogat (1939-43) and he was a staff artiste at the Kolkata Centre of All India Radio. After partition he came to Dhaka and worked on Daily Azad, Monthly Mohammadi, Daily Krishak, Daily Ittehad, Weekly Prabaha, etc.

== Biography ==
He was born in Shankar Pasha, Barisal district (now in Pirojpur Sadar Upazila, Bangladesh). His father's name is Hamijuddin Hawladar and his mother's name is Jomila Khatun. He had been writing poem since his school life. While studying in Brojomohun College, he shifted to Kolkata for livelihood.

He worked for various periodicals, including, from 1939 to 1943, the monthly literary journal Saogat. From 1943 to 1948 he was on the staff of All India Radio.

After the partition of India, he moved to Dhaka. There he worked for the Monthly Mohammadi, among other publications. From 1957 to 1964 he was the production adviser of Franklin Publications. He joined Dainik Pakistan in 1964 and continued there through its name change to Dainik Bangla until 1985.

== Literary works ==
=== Poems ===
His first book of poetry was Ratri Shesh. Others include:

- Chhaya Horin (1962)
- Shara Dupur (1964)
- Ashay Boshoty (1974)
- Megh Bole Choitrey Jabo (1976)
- Duhate Dui Adim Pathar (1980)

=== For children ===
- Josna Rater Golpo
- Brsti Pare Tapur Tupur (1977)
- Chutir Din Dupure (1978)

=== Novels ===
- Ranee Khaler Shako (for teenagers)
- Aronno Neelima
- Zafrani Rong Payra

== Awards ==
Ahsan Habib received several awards for his literary achievements, including:

- UNESCO Literary Prize (1960–61) for his Bengali translation of Treasure Island
- Bangla Academy Literary Award (1961)
- Adamjee Literary Award (1964)
- Nasiruddin Gold Medal (1977)
- Ekushey Padak (1978)
- Jatiya (National) Padak
- Abul Mansur Ahmed Memorial Prize (1980)
- Abul Kalam Memorial Prize (1984)
