= Abdullah-Al-Muti =

Bangladeshi science writer and educationalist (1930–1998)

Abdullah Al Muti
- আব্দুল্লাহ আল মুতী
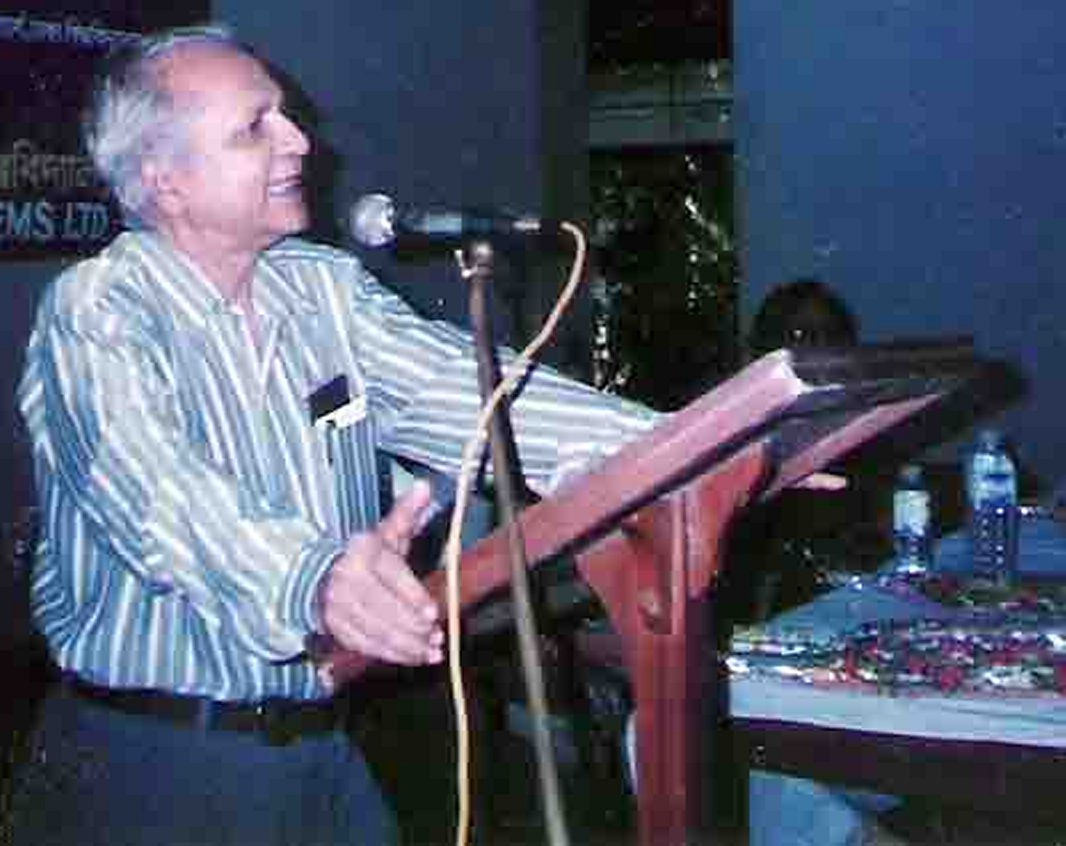

President of Bangla Academy
- In office 13 November 1986 – 13 November 1990
- Preceded by: Abu Mohammed Habibullah
- Succeeded by: Gazi Shamsur Rahman

Personal details
- Born: 1 January 1930 Sirajganj, Bengal Presidency, British India
- Died: 30 November 1998 (aged 68)
- Education: MSc (Physics); MA (Education); PhD (Education)
- Alma mater: University of Dhaka; University of Chicago
- Occupation: Educationalist, writer
- Awards: full list

Abdullah Al Muti Sharafuddin (1 January 1930 – 30 November 1998), known as Abdullah Al Muti, was a Bangladeshi educationalist and science writer. He wrote tough scientific ideas in an easy fashion suitable for children and teenagers. He became first Bangladeshi writer to win the UNESCO Kalinga Prize in 1983. He had earned major national awards - Bangla Academy Literary Award in 1975, Ekushey Padak in 1985 and Independence Day Award in 1995. He wrote many science fiction stories like Akash(আকাশ)

== Early life ==
Abdullah Al-Muti was on 1 January 1930 in Fulbari village of Sirajganj in East Bengal. His father's name is Sheikh Moin Sharafuddin and his mother is Halima Begum. In 1945, attending matriculation (presently SSC) from Muslim High School, Dhaka he placed second in Kolkata board. Two years later he passes IA exam (presently HSC) and got admitted in the University of Dhaka. He completed his B.Sc. and M.Sc. in physics standing first class first in 1952 and 1953 respectively. Then he got a scholarship from US government and went to University of Chicago, Illinois. There he accomplished MA (education) and PhD (education) in 1960 and 1962 respectively.

== Career ==
Muti started his career as a lecturer in physics at the Rajshahi Government College in 1954. He became professor in the same college in 1955. He held the post Director, Education Extension Center, Dhaka from 1965 to 1973. He also assumed office as Education and Culture Councilor at different foreign embassies of Bangladesh, Joint Secretary, Additional Secretary and Secretary at Education and Science Ministry at different times. After his retirement in 1986, he was the chief adviser of Secondary Scientific Education Program financed by ADB and UNDP. Besides he also presented several science related popular programs in radio and television.

Muti started writing on science since his school days. At that time he contributed articles to the Dainik Azad ('Mukuler Mahfil') and Monthly Mohammadi. He was also associated with editing tabloid magazines named 'Mukul' and 'Mukul Fouz'. Besides, he also wrote about prospects of education in the Monthly 'Hullor' and 'Dilruba'.

Muti wrote 27 books on science and education. He also translated 10 books from English into Bengali. He was the executive editor of UNESCO Batayan, a quarterly Bengali edition of Unesco Courier from 1982 until his death.

== Books ==
- Eso Bigganer Rajje (1955)
- Obak Prithibi (1955)
- Rohosser Shesh Nei (1969)
- Jana-Ojanar Deshe (1976)
- Sagorer Rohosshopuri (1976)
- Biggan O Manush (1975)
- E Juger Biggan (1981)
- Telivisioner Kotha (1988)
- Swadhinota, Shikhya O Onnano Prosongo
- Abiskarer Neshay (1969)
- Dangai Jole Hawai Chole (1977)

== Awards ==
- Independence Day Award (1995)
- Ekushey Padak (1985)
- Kalinga Award of UNESCO (1983)
- Bangla Academy Literary Award (1975)
- Shishu Academy Award
- Qudrat-i-Khuda Gold Medal
