= 1990 in Bangladesh =

- Centuries: 20th; 21st
- Decades: 1970s; 1980s; 1990s; 2000s; 2010s
- See also: Other events of 1990; List of years in Bangladesh

1990 (MCMXC) was a common year starting on Monday of the Gregorian calendar, the 1990th year of the Common Era (CE) and Anno Domini (AD) designations, the 990th year of the 2nd millennium, the 90th year of the 20th century, and the 1st year of the 1990s decade.

The year 1990 was the 19th year after the independence of Bangladesh. It was also the last year under administration of caretaker government of Hussain Muhammad Ershad.

== Incumbents ==
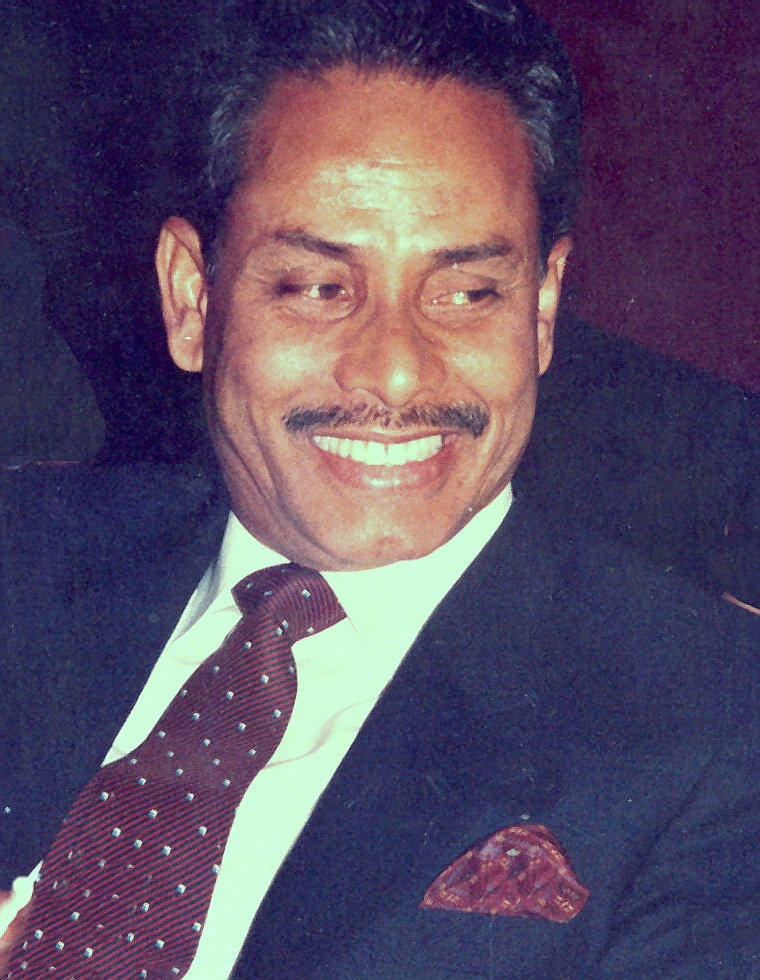
H. M.
Ershad

- President: Hussain Muhammad Ershad (until 6 December), Shahabuddin Ahmed (starting 6 December)
- Prime Minister: Kazi Zafar Ahmed (until 6 December)
- Vice President: Moudud Ahmed (until December); Shahabuddin Ahmed (starting December)
- Chief Justice: Badrul Haider Chowdhury (until 1 January), Shahabuddin Ahmed (starting 14 January)

== Demography ==
Demographic Indicators for Bangladesh in 1990
| Population, total | 103,171,957 |
| Population density (per km^{2}) | 792.6 |
| Population growth (annual %) | 2.4% |
| Male to Female Ratio (every 100 Female) | 106.5 |
| Urban population (% of total) | 19.8% |
| Birth rate, crude (per 1,000 people) | 35.1 |
| Death rate, crude (per 1,000 people) | 10.4 |
| Mortality rate, under 5 (per 1,000 live births) | 144 |
| Life expectancy at birth, total (years) | 58.2 |
| Fertility rate, total (births per woman) | 4.5 |

== Climate ==
Climate data for Bangladesh in 1990
| Month | Jan | Feb | Mar | Apr | May | Jun | Jul | Aug | Sep | Oct | Nov | Dec | Year |
|---|---|---|---|---|---|---|---|---|---|---|---|---|---|
| Daily mean °C (°F) | 19.5 (67.1) | 21.3 (70.3) | 23.9 (75.0) | 26.6 (79.9) | 28. (82) | 28.6 (83.5) | 27.9 (82.2) | 28.7 (83.7) | 28.3 (82.9) | 26.3 (79.3) | 24.8 (76.6) | 20.4 (68.7) | 25.4 (77.7) |
| Average precipitation mm (inches) | 1.8 (0.07) | 47.8 (1.88) | 101.3 (3.99) | 257.3 (10.13) | 261.3 (10.29) | 515.8 (20.31) | 522.6 (20.57) | 494.8 (19.48) | 316.5 (12.46) | 232.9 (9.17) | 53.5 (2.11) | 12.8 (0.50) | 2,818.2 (110.95) |
Source: Climatic Research Unit (CRU) of University of East Anglia (UEA)

== Economy ==
Key Economic Indicators for Bangladesh in 1990
National Income
| | Current US$ | Current BDT | % of GDP |
|---|---|---|---|
| GDP | $31.6 billion | BDT1,039.6 billion | |
| GDP growth (annual %) | 5.6% | | |
| GDP per capita | $306.3 | BDT10,076 | |
| Agriculture, value added | $9.6 billion | BDT317.0 billion | 30.5% |
| Industry, value added | $6.4 billion | BDT209.4 billion | 20.1% |
| Services, etc., value added | $14.8 billion | BDT485.5 billion | 46.7% |
Balance of Payment
| | Current US$ | Current BDT | % of GDP |
| Current account balance | -$397.9 million | | -1.3% |
| Imports of goods and services | $3,959.8 million | BDT135.8 billion | 13.1% |
| Exports of goods and services | $2,064.0 million | BDT61.4 billion | 5.9% |
| Foreign direct investment, net inflows | $3.2 million | | 0.0% |
| Personal remittances, received | $778.9 million | | 2.5% |
| Total reserves (includes gold) at year end | $659.6 million | | |
| Total reserves in months of imports | 1.9 | | |

Note: For the year 1990 average official exchange rate for BDT was 34.57 per US$.

== Events ==
- 10 October – Naziruddin Jehad, an activist of the pro-democracy movement of Bangladesh, was killed due to the police excesses during the first nationwide strike of the full-fledged movement against Hussain Muhammad Ershad, in front of Dainik Bangla intersection of capital Dhaka.
- 30 October – A series of attacks against the Bengali Hindus in Bangladesh ensued following a rumour that the Babri mosque in Ayodhya in India had been demolished.
- 19 November – BNP led 7-party alliance, Awami League led 8-party alliance and Leftist five-party alliance drafted a "Joint Declaration of Three Alliance". This declaration provided a road-map outlining the process to hand over the Presidency of Ershad to a civil government. The declaration included the idea of a caretaker government that will take over after the fall of Ershad and will hold a free and fair election within 90 days of its arrival to the power.
- 27 November – Censorship is imposed on the newspapers enabling strict monitoring; newspaper owners and journalists decided not to publish newspapers from the very next day. Ershad declares state of emergency, curfew imposed.
- 4 December – The ongoing protests against the regime of H. M. Ershad turn into a mass uprising, when hundreds of thousands of people rallied in the streets of Dhaka practically bringing the capital of Bangladesh to a standstill.
- 6 December – President Hussain Muhammad Ershad is forced to resign; he is replaced by Shahabuddin Ahmed, who becomes interim president.
- Bangladesh passes the Narcotics Control Act of 1990.

=== Awards and recognitions ===
==== Independence Day Award ====
| Recipients | Area | Note |
|---|---|---|
| Aminul Islam | science and technology | |
| Muhamad Yasin | rural development | |

==== Ekushey Padak ====
1. Shawkat Ali (literature)
2. Abdul Ghani Hazari (journalism)
3. Lutful Haider Chowdhury (education)
4. Devdas Chakraborty (fine arts)
5. Rahija Khanam Jhunu (dance)
6. Khoda Box Shai (vocal music)

=== Sports ===
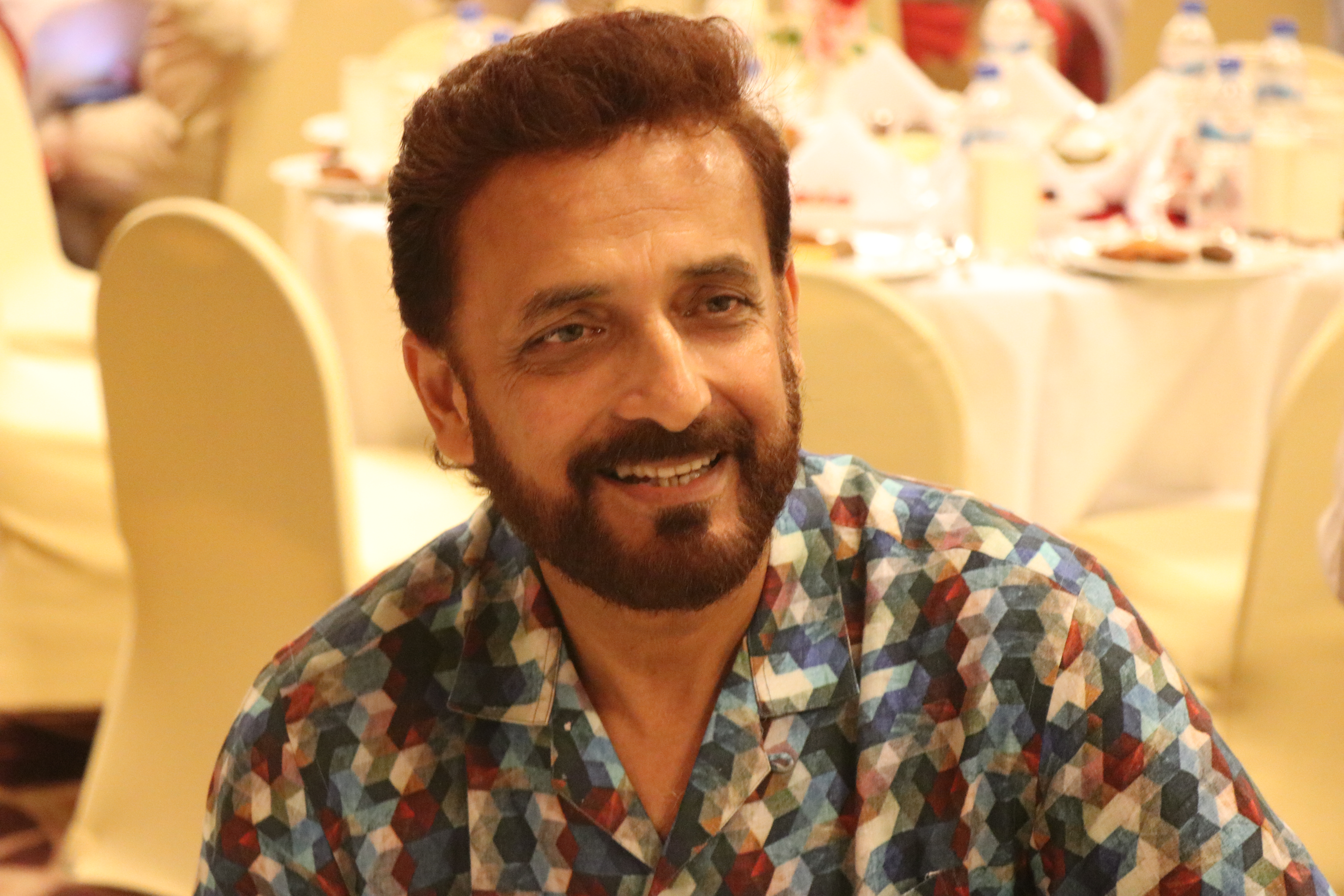
Atahar Ali Khan

- Asian Games:
  - Bangladesh participated in the 1990 Asian Games held in Beijing, China from 22 September to 7 October. Bangladesh national kabaddi team won silver medal in kabaddi.
- Commonwealth Games:
  - Bangladesh participated in the 1990 Commonwealth Games held in Auckland, New Zealand from 24 January to 13 February. Shooter Ateequr Rahman and Abdus Sattar won gold in men's 10m Air Pistol (Pair) event and bronze in men's 50m Free Pistol (Pair) event.
- Domestic football:
  - Abahani KC won [[1989–90 Dhaka First Division League]] title while Mohammedan SC became runner-up.
- Cricket:
  - Bangladesh played 2 ODIs as part of Austral-Asia Cup at Sharjah, UAE, and 2 more as part of 1990–91 Asia Cup in India. Bangladesh lost all 4 of the matches, but Athar Ali Khan of Bangladesh was judged player of the match for his unbeaten 78 runs in their Asia cup match against Sri Lanka.

== Births ==
- 1 January – Rubel Hossain, cricketer
- 10 April – Jamal Bhuyan, footballer
- 19 June – Sahara, actor
- 17 August – Nabib Newaj Jibon, footballer
- 1 October – Salma Khatun, cricketer
- 4 November – Nazim Ud Daula, novelist

== Deaths ==
- 15 January – Khoda Box, singer and composer (b. 1928)
- 23 July – Md Korban Ali, politician (b. 1924)
- 31 August – Mumtaz Ali Khan, musician (b. 1920)
- 31 December – Comrade Moni Singh, politician (b. 1901)

== See also ==
- 1990s in Bangladesh
- List of Bangladeshi films of 1990
- Timeline of Bangladeshi history
