= List of Ekushey Padak award recipients (1990–1999) =

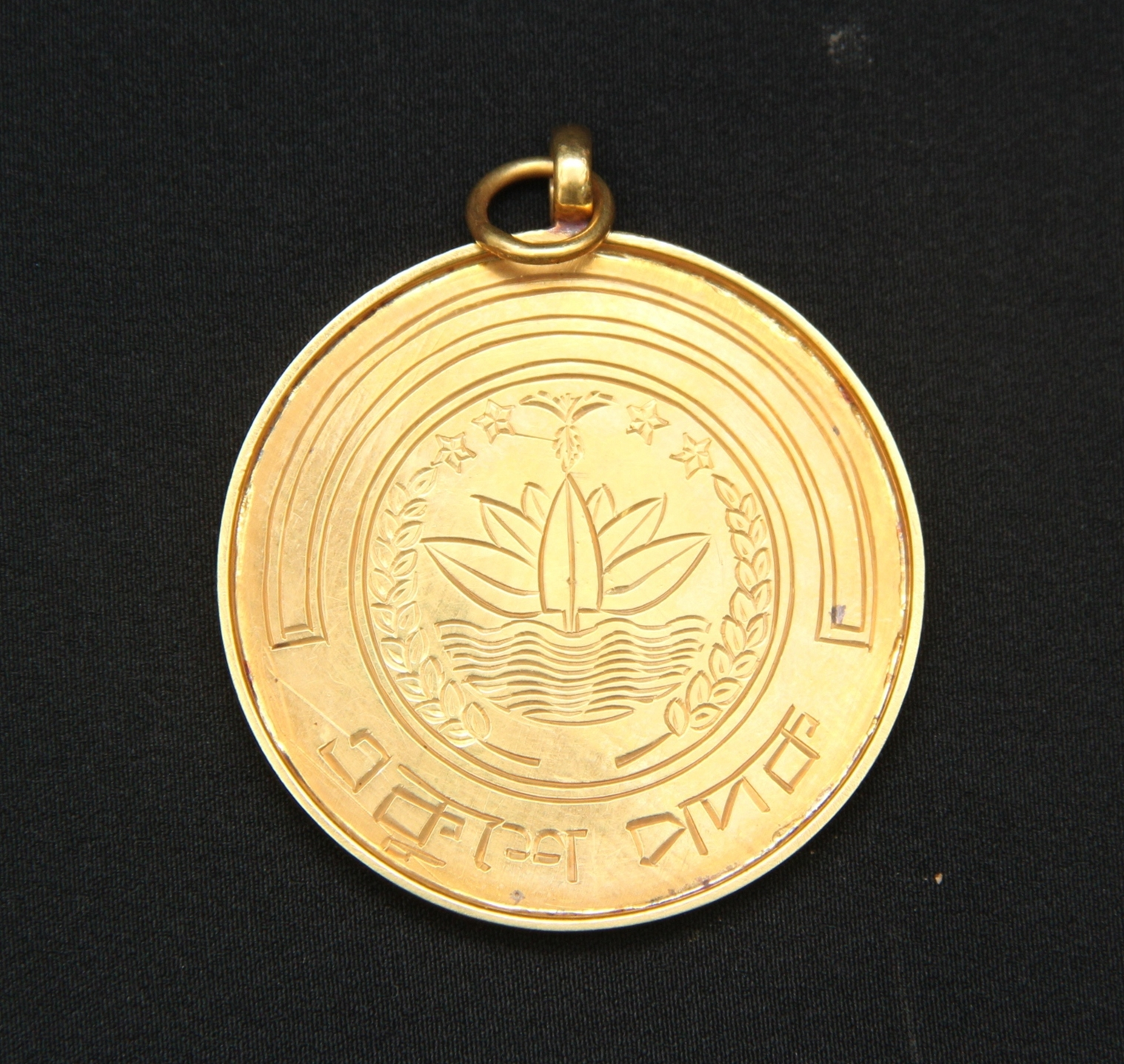
List of Ekushey Padak award recipients
- 1976–1979
- 1980–1989
- 1990–1999
- 2000–2009
- 2010–2019
- 2020–2029

== 1990 ==
1. Shawkat Ali (literature)
2. Abdul Ghani Hazari (journalism)
3. Lutful Haider Chowdhury (education)
4. Devdas Chakraborty (fine arts)
5. Rahija Khanam Jhunu (dance)
6. Khoda Box Shai (vocal music)

== 1991 ==
1. Ahmed Sharif (education)
2. Kabir Chowdhury (literature)
3. A.F. Salahuddin Ahmed (education)
4. A.M. Harun-ar-Rashid (science)
5. Foyez Ahmad (literature)
6. Sanjida Khatun (literature)
7. Aminul Huq
8. Kazi Abdul Baset (fine arts)

== 1992 ==
1. Dewan Mohammad Azraf (literature)
2. Mobashwer Ali (literature)
3. Emajuddin Ahamed (education)
4. Khan Mohammad Salek (education)
5. Gias Kamal Chowdhury (journalism)
6. Ataus Samad (journalism)
7. Shahnaz Rahmatullah (music)
8. Amjad Hossain (drama)
9. Hashem Khan (fine arts)

== 1993 ==
1. Moniruddin Yusuf (literature)
2. Rabeya Khatun (literature)
3. Mofazzal Haider Chaudhuri (education)
4. Riaz Uddin Ahmed (journalism)
5. Mohammad Asafuddowla (music)
6. Fazlul Huq (musician) (music)
7. Dilara Zaman (acting)
8. Rafiqun Nabi (fine arts)
9. Jewel Aich (magic arts)

== 1994 ==
1. Sarder Jayenuddin (literature)
2. Humayun Ahmed (literature)
3. Ali Monsur (drama)
4. Abu Taher (fine arts)
5. Nina Hamid (vocal music)
6. Shahadat Hossain Khan (instrumental music)
7. Mohammad Noman (education)
8. Hasanuzzaman Khan (journalism)

== 1995 ==
1. Ahmed Rafiq (literature)
2. Rawshan Jamil (dance)
3. Mustafa Zaman Abbasi (music)
4. Rathindranath Roy (music)
5. Abdul Karim (education)
6. Iajuddin Ahmed (education)
7. Nizamuddin Ahmad (journalism)
8. Shykh Seraj (journalism)

== 1996 ==
1. Hasnat Abdul Hye (literature)
2. Rahat Khan (literature)
3. A K M Firoz Alam (music)
4. Muhammad Abdul Hye (education)
5. Sirajul Islam Chowdhury (education)
6. Mohammad Kamruzzaman (journalism)
7. Mohammad Shahjahan (education)

== 1997 ==
1. Abu Ishaque (literature)
2. Novera Ahmed (sculpture)
3. Nitun Kundu (sculpture)
4. Debu Bhattacharya (music)
5. Runu Biswas (dance)
6. Razia Khan (education)
7. Serajul Huq (education)
8. Shabnam Mustari (music)
9. Santosh Gupta (journalism)
10. Monajatuddin (journalism)
11. Momtazuddin Ahmed (drama)

== 1998 ==
1. Ranesh Das Gupta (literature)
2. Akhtaruzzaman Ilias (literature)
3. Rokanuzzaman Khan (journalism)
4. Abul Kashem Sandwip (journalism)
5. Ferdousi Mazumder (drama)
6. Mahbuba Rahman (music)

== 1999 ==
1. Hasan Azizul Huq (literature)
2. Syed Hasan Imam (film)
3. Subhash Dutta (film)
4. Ali Zaker (drama)
5. Monirul Islam (fine arts)
6. Husna Banu Khanam (music)
7. Fakir Alamgir (music)
8. A B M Musa (journalism)
9. K G Mustafa (journalism)
10. Altamas Ahmed (dance)
