= Bangla Academy Fellowship =

Honor organisation for the Bangla Academy

Bangla Academy Fellowship is an honor organization that recognizes notable people from the Bangla Academy. This fellowship is awarded annually in recognition of special contributions to their respective fields. So far, those who have received Bangla Academy Fellowship are:

== Fellows ==
1. Maulana Mohammad Akram Khan
2. Muhammad Shahidullah
3. Golam Mostafa
4. Jasimuddin
5. Begum Shamsun Nahar Mahmood
6. Zainul Abedin
7. Khan Bahadur Ahsanullah
8. Sheikh Reazuddin Ahmed
9. Sheikh Habibur Rahman
10. Nurunnesa Khatun Vidyabinodini
11. Mozammel Hawk
12. Khoda Box
13. Aroj Ali Matubbar
14. Mujibur Rahman biswas
15. Mahbub ul Alam Chowdhury
16. Manindra Nath Samajdar
17. Sheikh Lutfar Rahman
18. Kamaluddin Ahmed
19. Safiuddin Ahmed
20. Kamrul Hasan Bhuiyan
21. Abu Sayed Chowdhury
22. Abdul Ahad
23. Azizur Rahman Mallik
24. Shah Fazlur Rahman
25. Abdur Razzak
26. Mohammad Ibrahim
27. Muhammad Shams-ul Haq
28. Mohammad Nurul Haque
29. Dewan Mohammad Azaroff
30. Abdul Haque Faridi
31. Mohammad Nasiruddin
32. Firoza Begum
33. Kalim Sharafi
34. Khan Sarwar Murshid
35. Ghaziul Haque
36. A. F. Salahuddin Ahmed
37. Barin Majumdar
38. Lutfar Rahman Sarkar
39. Abdul Latif
40. Nurjahan Begum
41. Waheedul Haq (2000)
42. Rehman Sobhan (2000)
43. Qayyum Chowdhury (2001)
44. Mohammad Saidur Rahman (2001)
45. Abdul Halim Bayati (2001)
46. Abdul Matin (2001)
47. Tofail Ahmed (2001)
48. Begazadi Mahmuda Nasir (2002 )
49. Jamal Nazrul Islam (2002)
50. Mohammad Ferdous Khan (2003)
51. Emajuddin Ahmed (2003 )
52. Ferdousi Rahman (2003)
53. Nurul Islam (2004)
54. Iqbal Mahmood (2004)
55. Rahiza Khanam Jhunu (2004)
56. M Shamsher Ali (2005)
57. MH Khan (2005)
58. MQK Talukder (2005)
59. Suddhananda Mahath (2005)
60. William Radice (2005)
61. Kazi Azhar Ali (2006)
62. Kazi Abdul Fatah (2006)
63. AHM Tohidul Anwar Chowdhury (2006)
64. Jamilur Reza Chowdhury (2006)
65. M Inas Ali (2007)
66. Abul Maqsood Aaron Aur Rashid (2007)
67. Muzaffar Ahmed (2007)
68. Hashem Khan (2007)
69. Sohrab Hossain (2007)
70. Nooruddin Ahmed (2007)
71. Quamrul Islam Siddique (2007)
72. Musharraf Hossain (2008)
73. Sudhin Das (2008)
74. Ajay Roy (2008)
75. Sirajul Islam Chowdhury (2008)
76. Sohrabuddin Ahmed (2008)
77. Nazrul Islam (2008)
78. Rafiqun Nobi (2008)
79. Amlesh Chandra Mandal (2008)
80. Nurul Islam Kabinobod (2009)
81. Amanul Haque (2009)
82. Imadad Hossain (2009)
83. Rawshan Ara Bachchu (2009)
84. ABM Musa (2009)
85. Ataus Samad (2009)
86. Abul Maal Abdul Muhith (2009)
87. M Amir-ul Islam (2009)
88. Mahbubur Rahman (2009)
89. Abdul Latif Mia (2009)
90. Akbar Ali Khan (2009)
91. Ferdousi Majumdar (2009)
92. Bibi Russell (2009)
93. Send Habibullah (2009)
94. Abdus Samad Mandal (2009)
95. Kazuo Azuma (2009)
96. Clinton Booth Seeley (2009)
97. Atiqul Haque Chowdhury (2010)
98. ABM Hossain (2010)
99. Kamal Lohani (2010)
100. Jamil Chowdhury (2010)
101. Enamul Haque (2010)
102. Shahnara Hossain (2010)
103. Mustafa Zaman Abbasi (2010)
104. Rashid Talukder (2010)
105. Ramendu Majumder (2010)
106. Laila Hassan (2010)
107. Farida Parveen (2010)
108. Amartya Sen (23)
109. Sheikh Hasina (2011)
110. Abdur Rauf (2011)
111. Sheikh Hafizur Rahman (2011)
112. Tofazzal Hossain (2011)
113. Mostafa Monowar (2011)
114. Khondakar Ibrahim Khaled (2011)
115. Mizanur Rahman Shelley (2011)
116. Sultana Kamal (2011)
117. Mahbube Alam (2011)
118. Sonia Nishat Amin (2011)
119. Saidur Rahman Bayati (2011)
120. Nurul Islam (2011)
121. Tafazzal Islam (2012)
122. Mohiuddin Khan Alamgir (2012)
123. Mohiuddin Ahmed (2012)
124. Runa Laila (2012)
125. Mohammad Saiduzzaman (2012)
126. Murtaza Bashir (2012)
127. Ramkani Das (2012)
128. Pran Gopal Dutt (2012)
129. Atiur Rahman (2012)
130. Sabina Yasmin (2012)
131. Syed Hasan Imam (2013)
132. Monayem Sarkar (2013)
133. Fakir Alamgir (2013)
134. ATM Shamsul Huda (2013)
135. Ferdousi Beloved (2013)
136. Shahadat Hossain Khan (2013)
137. Nasir Uddin Yusuf (2013)
138. Abul Hasnat (2013)
139. Partha Pratim Majumder (2014)
140. Ataur Rahman (2014)
141. Mohammad Zamir (2014)
142. A. B. M. Khairul Haque (2014)
143. Abdul Mannan Chowdhury (2014)
144. Shimul Yusuf (2014)
145. Fatima Tujh Zohra (2014)
146. Fazle Hasan Abed (2014)
147. Mohammad Farsuddin (2015)
148. Anupam Sen (2015)
149. Abed Khan (2015)
150. Abu Mohammad Swapan Adnan (2015)
151. Mahfuz Anam (2015)
152. Papaya Sarovar (2015)
153. Toab Khan (2016)
154. Alamgir Mohammad Sirajuddin (2016)
155. Abul Kalam Azad Chowdhury (2016)
156. Rafiq-ul-Haq (2016)
157. Rathindranath Roy (2016)
158. Shaykh Siraj (2016)
159. Mushtaari Shafi (2016)
160. Iqbal Bahar Chowdhury (2017)
161. Pratibha Matsuddi (2017)
162. ABM Abdullah (2017)
163. Ainun Nishat (2017)
164. Noorun Prophet (2017)
165. Abu Hassan Shahriar (2017)
166. Dulal Talukder (2017)
167. Aminul Islam Bhuiyan (2018)
168. Monirul Islam (2018)
169. Manjulika Chakma (2018)
170. SM Mohsin (2018)
171. Samantha Lal Sen (2018)
172. Roshan Ara Mustafiz (2018)
173. Escaped government (2018)
174. Syed Anwar Husain (2019)
175. Sheikh Mohammed Shahidullah (2019)
176. Abdul Malik (2019)
177. Kumudini Hajong (2019)
178. Kangalini Sufiya (2019)
179. Ali Zakar (2019)
180. Asaduzzaman Noor (2019)
181. Professor Dr Md. Zakir Hossain (2022)
