= 1989 in Bangladesh =

- Centuries: 20th; 21st
- Decades: 1960s; 1970s; 1980s; 1990s; 2000s
- See also: Other events of 1989; List of years in Bangladesh

1989 (MCMLXXXIX) was a common year starting on Sunday of the Gregorian calendar, the 1989th year of the Common Era (CE) and Anno Domini (AD) designations, the 989th year of the 2nd millennium, the 89th year of the 20th century, and the 10th and last year of the 1980s decade.

The year 1989 was the 18th year after the independence of Bangladesh. It was also the eighth year of the Government of Hussain Muhammad Ershad.

== Incumbents ==
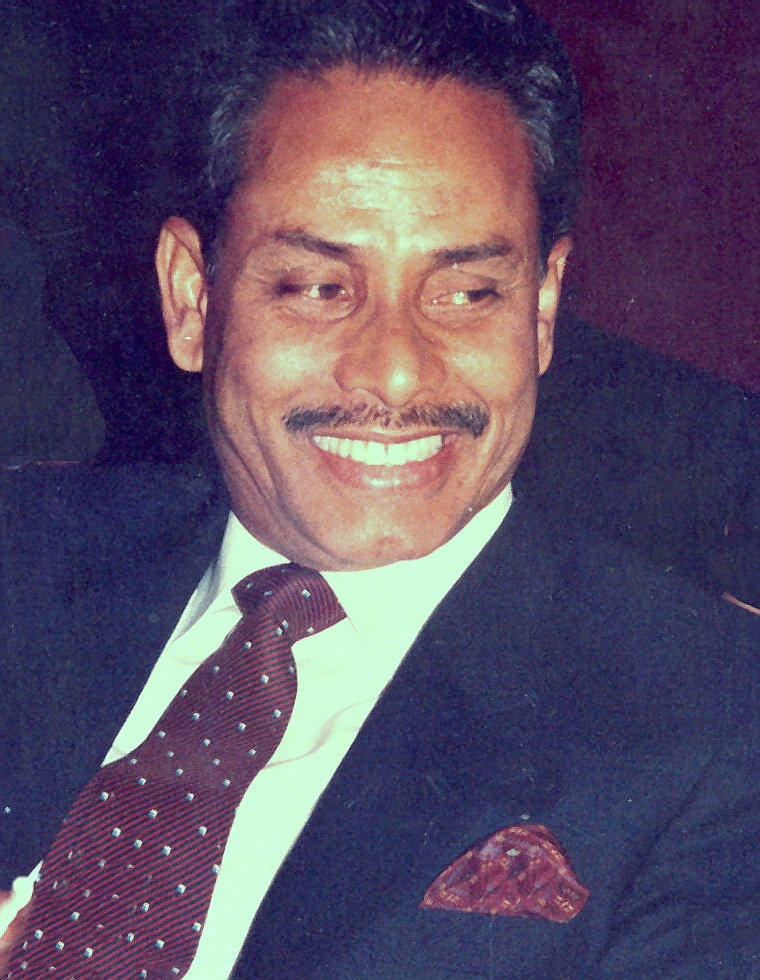
H. M.
Ershad

- President: Hussain Muhammad Ershad
- Prime Minister: Moudud Ahmed (until 12 August), Kazi Zafar Ahmed (starting 12 August)
- Vice President: A. K. M. Nurul Islam (until month and day unknown); Moudud Ahmed (starting September)
- Chief Justice: F.K.M. Munim (until 30 November), Badrul Haider Chowdhury (starting 1 December)

== Demography ==
Demographic Indicators for Bangladesh in 1989
Population, total	100,695,496
Population density (per km^{2})	773.6
Population growth (annual %)	2.5%
Male to Female Ratio (every 100 Female)	106.6
Urban population (% of total)	19.3%
Birth rate, crude (per 1,000 people)	36.0
Death rate, crude (per 1,000 people)	10.8
Mortality rate, under 5 (per 1,000 live births)	150
Life expectancy at birth, total (years)	57.6
Fertility rate, total (births per woman)	4.7

== Climate ==
Climate data for Bangladesh in 1989
Month	Jan	Feb	Mar	Apr	May	Jun	Jul	Aug	Sep	Oct	Nov	Dec	Year
Daily mean °C (°F)	17.5 (63.5)	21. (70)	25.3 (77.5)	28.4 (83.1)	29. (84)	28.3 (82.9)	28.2 (82.8)	28.6 (83.5)	28.2 (82.8)	27.2 (81.0)	23.4 (74.1)	19.2 (66.6)	25.4 (77.7)
Average precipitation mm (inches)	3. (0.1)	21.5 (0.85)	14.8 (0.58)	90.3 (3.56)	290.2 (11.43)	412. (16.2)	530.4 (20.88)	172.1 (6.78)	334.3 (13.16)	274.4 (10.80)	4.4 (0.17)	4.8 (0.19)	2,152.2 (84.73)
Source: Climatic Research Unit (CRU) of University of East Anglia (UEA)

== Economy ==
Key Economic Indicators for Bangladesh in 1989
National Income
	Current US$	Current BDT	% of GDP
GDP	$28.8 billion	BDT923.9 billion	
GDP growth (annual %)	2.8%		
GDP per capita	$285.8	BDT9,175	
Agriculture, value added	$8.8 billion	BDT282.4 billion	30.6%
Industry, value added	$5.7 billion	BDT182.8 billion	19.8%
Services, etc., value added	$13.6 billion	BDT435.9 billion	47.2%
Balance of Payment
	Current US$	Current BDT	% of GDP
Current account balance	-$1,099.6 million		-3.8%
Imports of goods and services	$4,026.5 million	BDT118.1 billion	12.8%
Exports of goods and services	$1,639.2 million	BDT51.2 billion	5.5%
Foreign direct investment, net inflows	$0.2 million		0.0%
Personal remittances, received	$758.0 million		2.6%
Total reserves (includes gold) at year end	$532.1 million		
Total reserves in months of imports	1.5		

Note: For the year 1989 average official exchange rate for BDT was 32.27 per US$.

== Events ==
- 25 January – At Pubail, Gazipur District, a northbound mail train collides head-on with an express going to Chittagong and several cars roll off an embankment into a rice paddy. At least 110 are killed and thousands injured.
- 9 April - Munir Hussain, a wealthy industrialist, kills his wife Sharmin Rima after only four months of marriage. The murder and subsequent trial generates widespread public comment.
- 26 April - A tornado struck Manikganj District destroying around 90 percent of homes in 153 villages. The death-count was almost 600.
- 11 August- In Dhaka, the Bangabandhu Bhaban, the residence of Sheikh Hasina was attacked with gunfire and bombs by activists of Bangladesh Freedom Party.
- 6 September - Gruesome murder of Birajabala Debnath and her children was committed by a mob at the village of Nidarabad under Harashpur Union of Nasirnagar Upazila in Brahmanbaria District.
- 30 October - Apparently as a reaction to the laying of the foundation of Ram temple adjacent to the disputed structure in Ayodhya in India, Hindu shops were looted and set on fire in Chittagong, in spite of a curfew. Hindu men and women were attacked and molested.
- 11 November - An Islamist mob attacked Hindu shops and temples in Narsingdi. More than 25 Hindu-owned shops were set on fire and images in three temples were smashed.

=== Awards and recognitions ===
==== Independence Day Award ====
Recipients	Area	Note
Professor Dr. Md. Mostafizur Rahman	medical science and social work	
Niaz Morshed	sports	

==== Ekushey Padak ====
1. Shahed Ali (literature)
2. Razia Mazid (literature)
3. Mahmud Shah Koreshi (education)
4. Mohammad Asafudowlah Reza (journalism)
5. AKM Shahidul Huq (journalism)
6. Abdur Razzak (fine arts)
7. Amalendu Biswas (drama act)

=== Sports ===
- South Asian (Federation) Games:
  - Bangladesh participated in the fourth South Asian Federation Games held in Islamabad from 20 to 27 October. With 1 gold, 12 silvers and 24 bronzes Bangladesh ended the tournament at the fifth position in overall points table.
- Domestic football:
  - Abahani KC won [[1989–90 Dhaka First Division League]] title while Mohammedan SC became runner-up.
  - Mohammedan SC won Bangladesh Federation Cup title.

== Births ==
- 20 March – Tamim Iqbal, cricketer
- 1 August – Abdullah Hel Baki, sports shooter
- 1 August – Reasat Islam Khaton, footballer
- 17 December – Sunny Sanwar, artist and social activist

== Deaths ==
- 20 January – Alamgir Kabir, film director (b. 1938)
- 7 April – Amena Begum, politician (b. 1925)
- 23 September – Abu Hena Mustafa Kamal, author (b. 1936)
- 19 November – Mohammad Abdul Jalil, freedom fighter (b. 1942)

== See also ==
- 1980s in Bangladesh
- Timeline of Bangladeshi history
