= Bharat-Bangladesh Maitri Udyan =

Memorial park

- ভারত-বাংলা মুক্তি মৈত্রী পার্ক
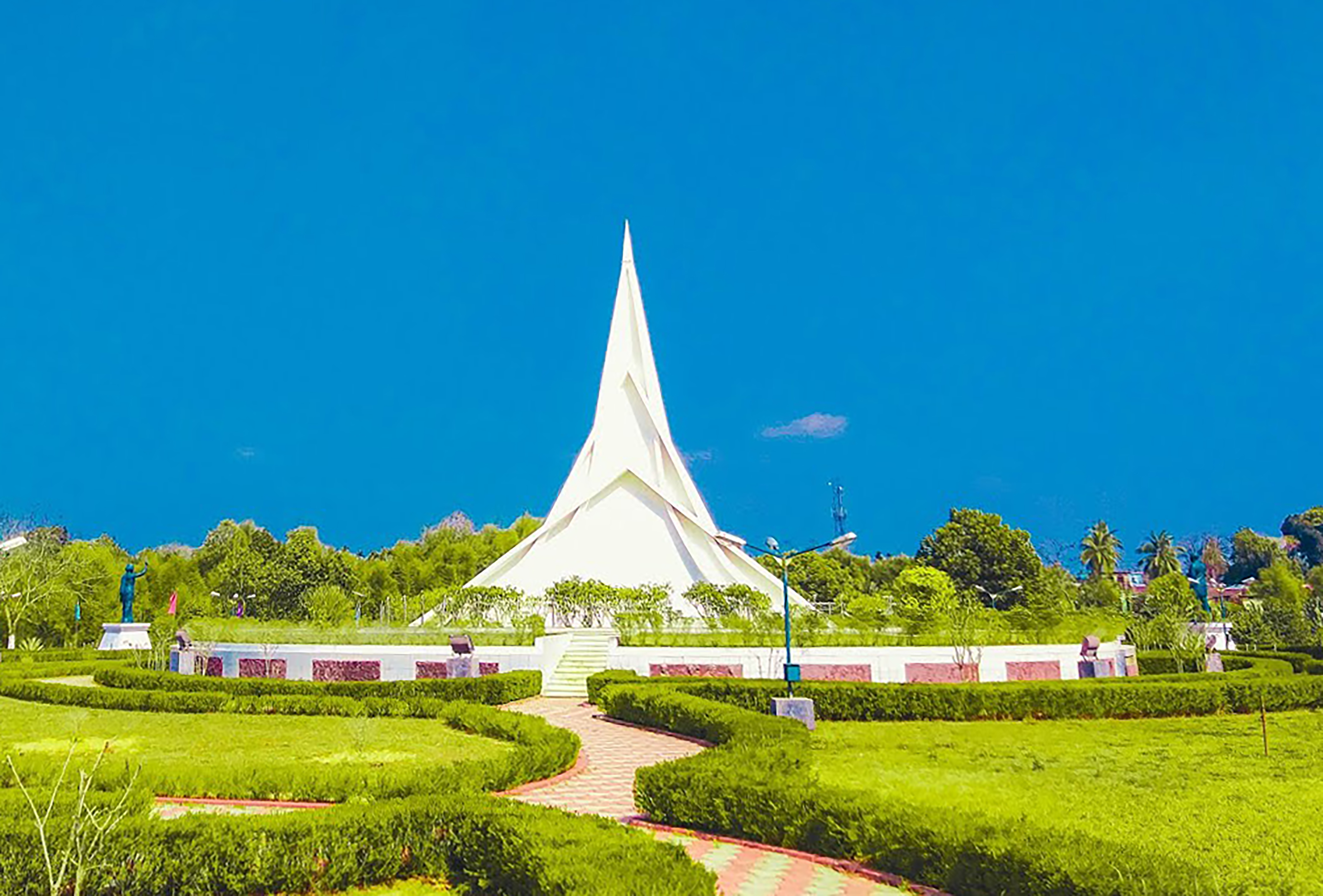
- Interactive map of Bharat-Bangladesh Maitri Udyan
- Type: Park built at Chottakhola as a tribute to the Bangladeshi Freedom Fighters and Indian soldiers
- Location: Chottakhola, Belonia, Tripura, India
- Coordinates: 23°07′2.9″N 91°22′37.2″E
- Opened: 11 November 2010
- Status: Complete

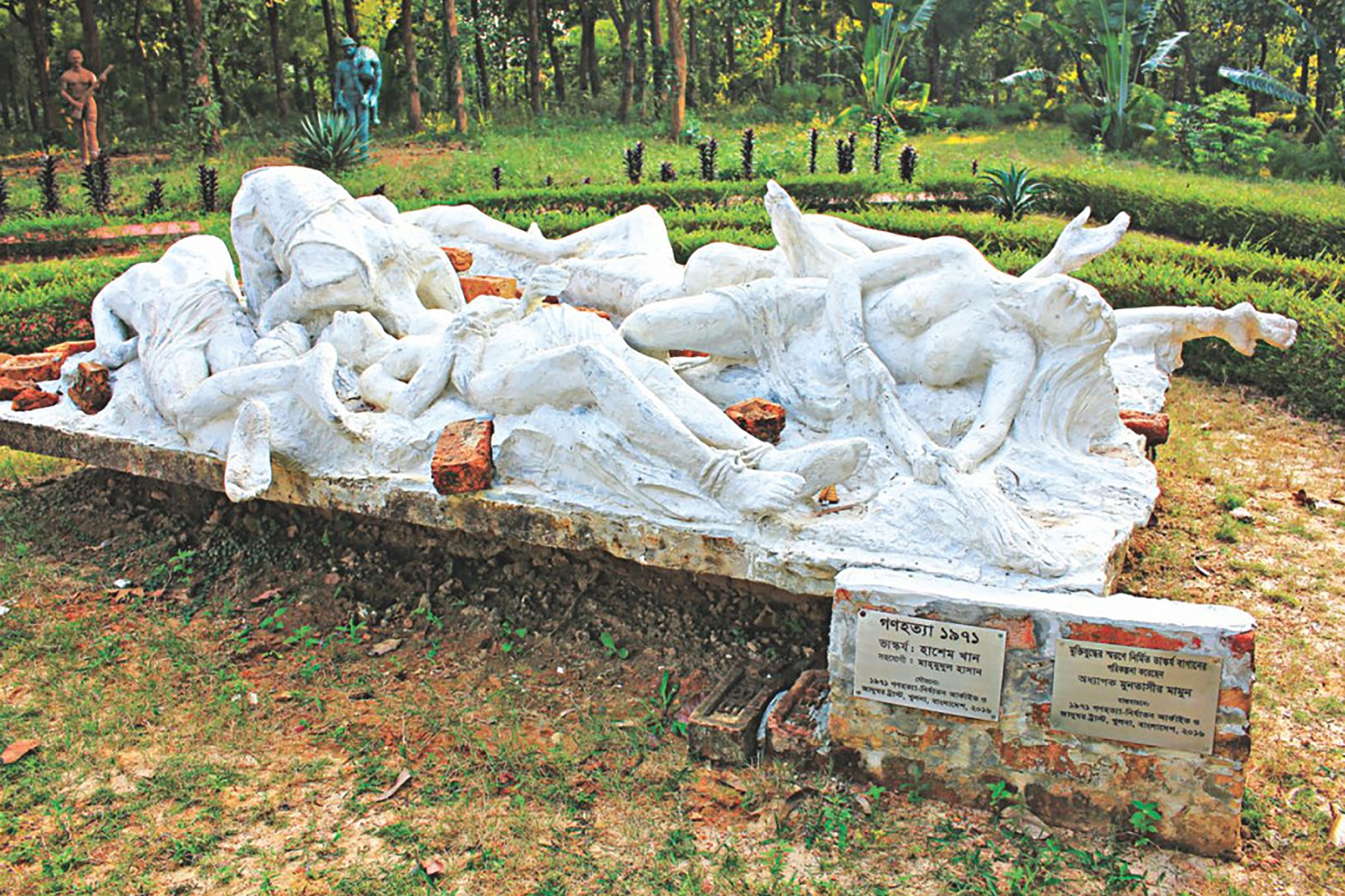
"Gonohotta 1971" by Hashem Khan and collaboration with Mahmudul Hasan Shohag

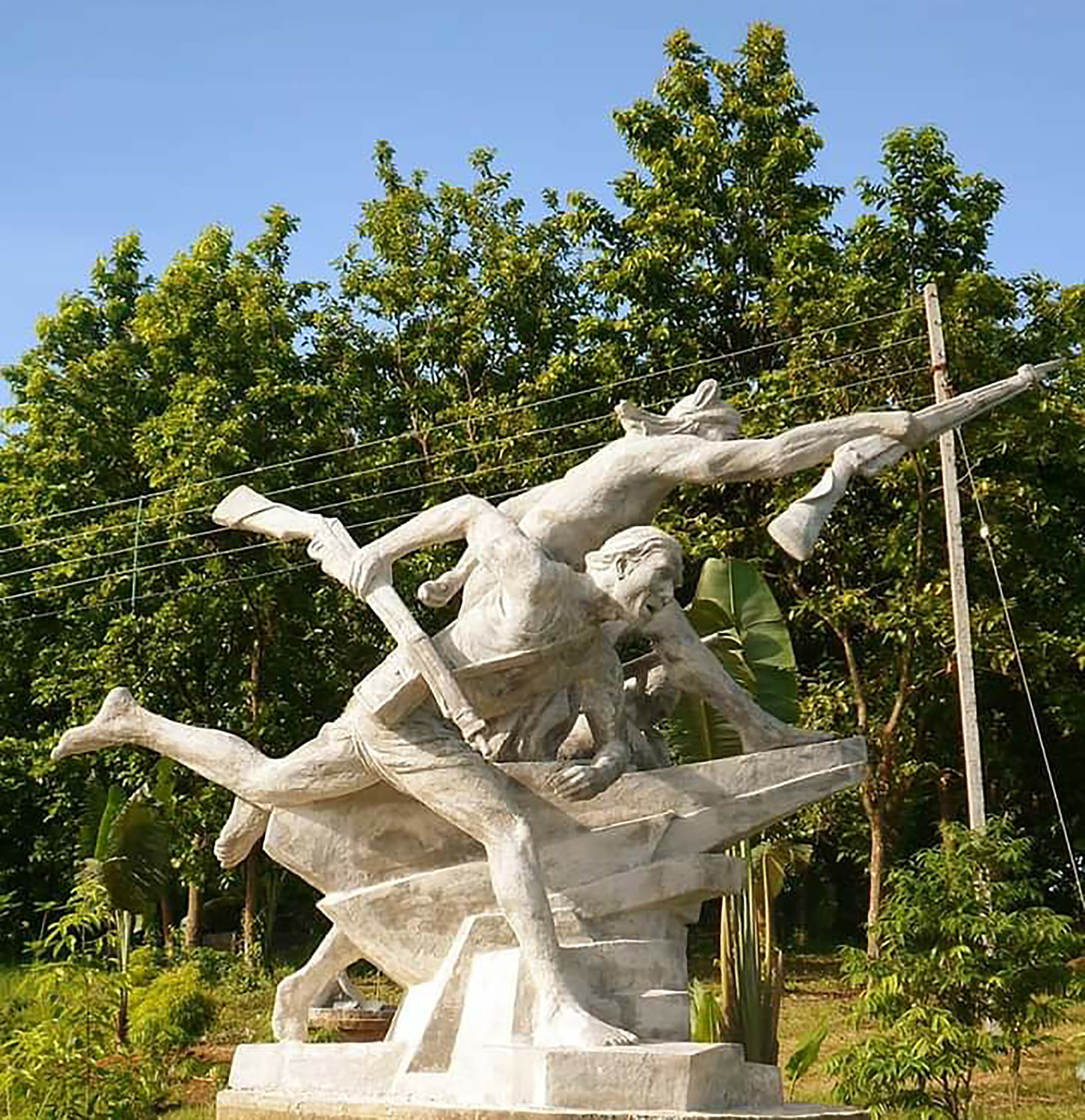
"Bijoy 1971" by Mahmudul Hasan Shohag

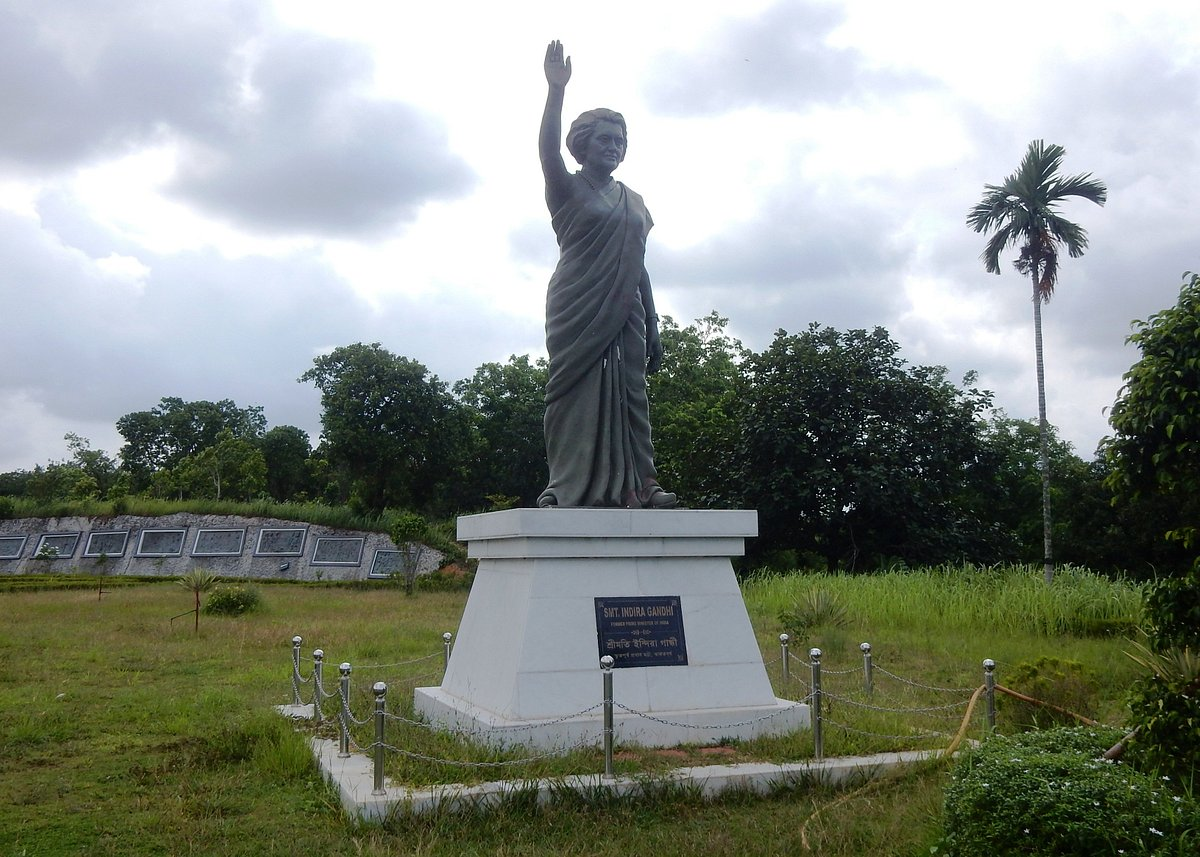
Statue of Indira Gandhi

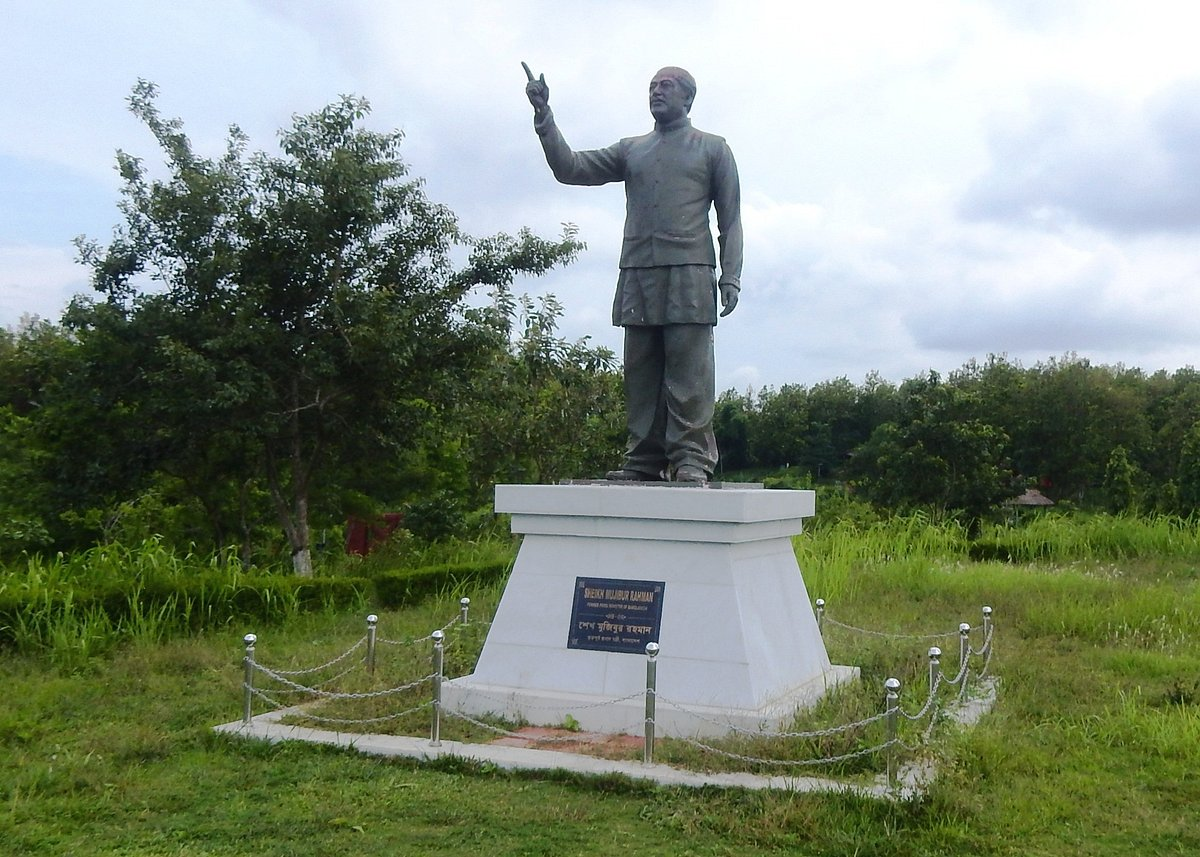
Statue of Bangabandhu Sheikh Mujibur Rahman

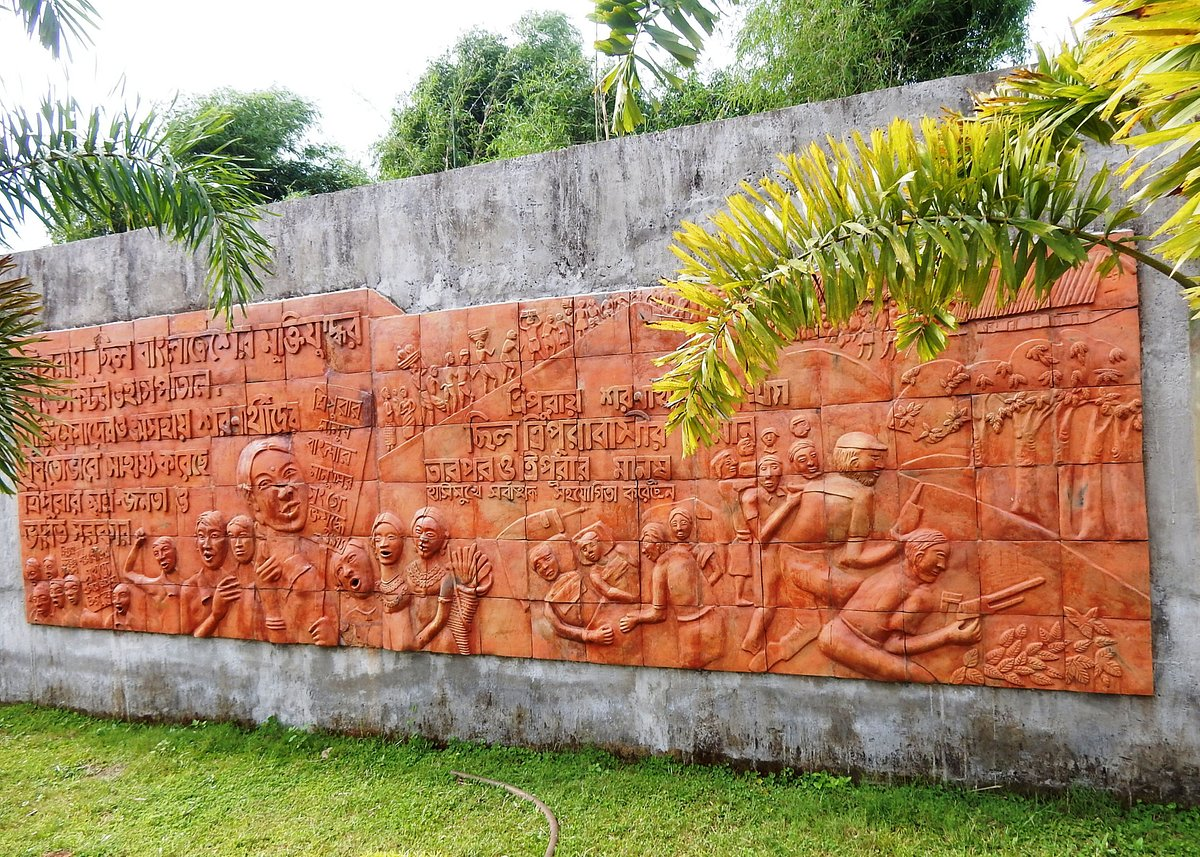
Terracotta in Bharat-Bangladesh Maitri Udyan

Bharat-Bangladesh Maitri Udyan (Bengali: ভারত-বাংলা মুক্তি মৈত্রী পার্ক, lit. 'India-Bangladesh Friendship Park') in Chottakhola was one of the base camps of Bangladeshi Freedom Fighters from where they launched guerrilla warfare against the Pakistani army in Chittagong, Comilla and greater Noakhali.

== Location ==
Located near the international border, the Maitri Udyan is a park built at Chottakhola in Tripura as a tribute to the Bangladeshi Freedom Fighters and Indian soldiers, who sacrificed their lives during the Liberation War. A war museum, hillocks, verdant valleys, lakes, plants, sculptures, graveyards of Bangladeshi Freedom Fighters with various other elements, this is not just a park but much more than that.

== History ==
The memorial park was a long cherished demand of Tripura people as they were actively involved in the Liberation War. They provided all-out support to Freedom Fighters and sheltered around 1.6 million people, a number exceeding the then population of the state. Chottakhola, 130 kilometres from Tripura's capital Agartala, had functioned as one of the 11 warfront-camps in Tripura in 1971. The beautiful location comprises seven hillocks partly separated by a natural lake over 20 hectares of land. It saw intense activities during the Liberation War and still bears its memorabilia in the form of remnants of a number of bunkers and trenches built on it in 1971.

== Inauguration ==
Former Tripura Chief Minister Manik Sarkar inaugurated the memorial and park in the presence of Indian and Bangladeshi artists, intellectuals and freedom fighters on December 16, the Victory Day of Bangladesh. The then Bangladesh's Education Minister Dipu Moni laid the foundation stone of the park on 11 November 2010.

== Statues ==
- Prime Minister Indira Gandhi
- Founder of Bangladesh- Bangabandhu Sheikh Mujibur Rahman
- Bijoy 1971
- Gonohotta 1971
- Terracotta

== Artists and sculptors ==
Renowned artists from Tripura and Bangladesh are part of the project with their creations - from statues to paintings -that added to the memorial's attraction.

=== Bangladeshi artists and sculptors ===
- Hashem Khan
- Mahmudul Hasan Shohag
- Shyamal Chowdhury
- Tejosh Halder Josh

depicted sculptures for the park.

The memorial park would help successive generations of Bangladesh learn the history of their hard-won independence and how the two friendly neighbours joined forces to bring about the country's liberation.
