= Bose Cabin =

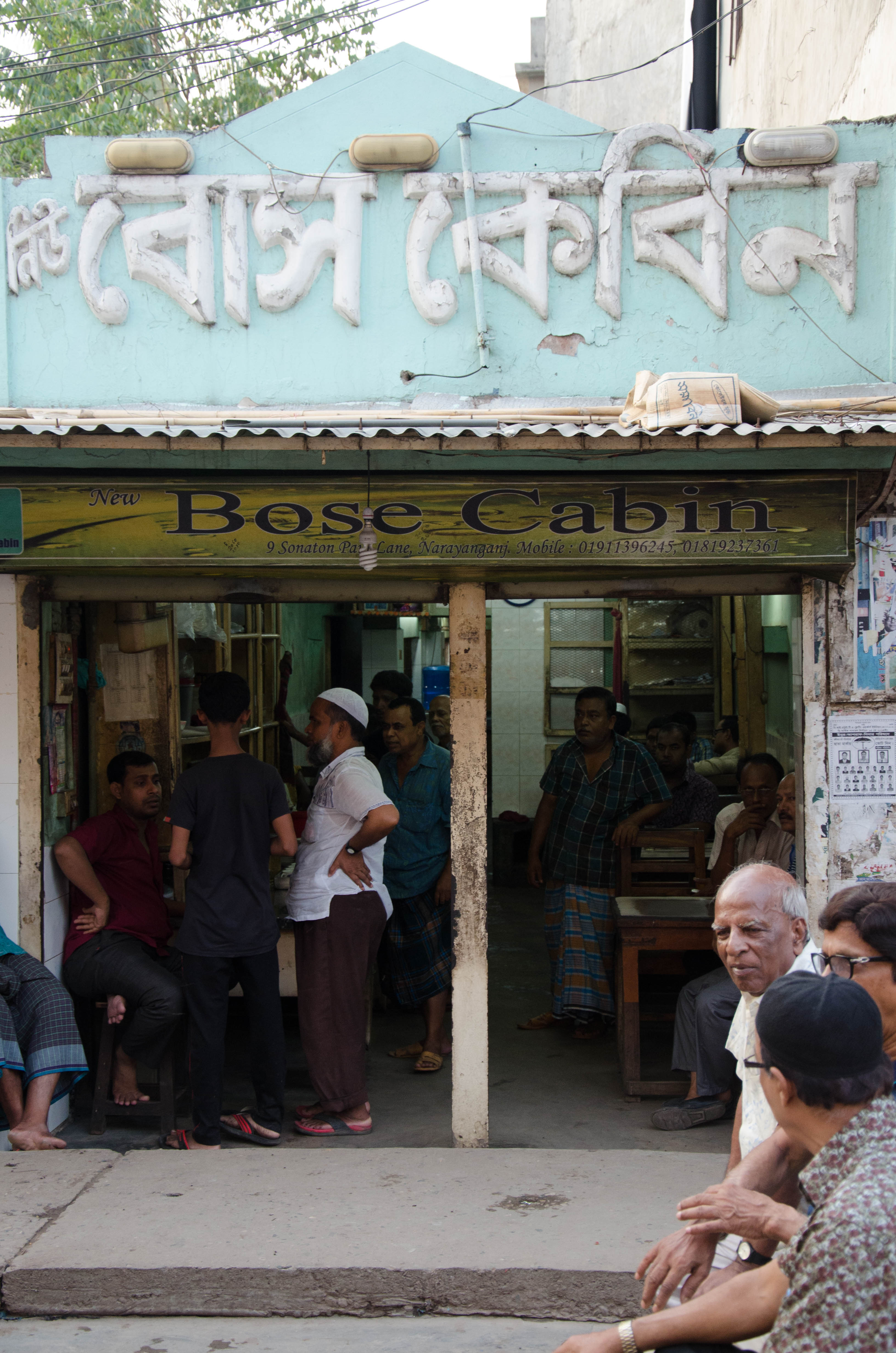
- Interactive map of Bose Cabin

Restaurant information
- Established: 1921
- Location: Narayanganj, Bangladesh
- Coordinates: 23.6162°N 90.5035°E

Bose Cabin is a historical restaurant located in Narayanganj District of Bangladesh. The place became known and popular during Indian independence movement.

== History ==
Nripendra Chandra Bose (Bhulu Babu) started the restaurant in 1921. Initially, it was set up at Fallpatti of Narayanganj Sadar between 1 No. and 2 No. Railway gate. In 1988, it was moved to Chamber Road. The name also changed to New Bose Cabin. Nripen came to Narayanganj in search of work from Shologhar village of Bikrampur and set up the restaurant. The cabin played an important role during the Indian independence movement. During the anti-British movement in the region, letters related to the movement were sent to the address of Bose cabin and then they were distributed from here.

The Cabin was also used by political figures to meet and chat during Bengali language movement in 1952, Liberation war of Bangladesh in 1971 and 1990 Mass Uprising in Bangladesh. The famous political leaders Subhas Chandra Bose, Huseyn Shaheed Suhrawardy, Sheikh Mujibur Rahman and Abdul Hamid Khan Bhashani are among them who visited and used to have tea here.

== Gallery ==
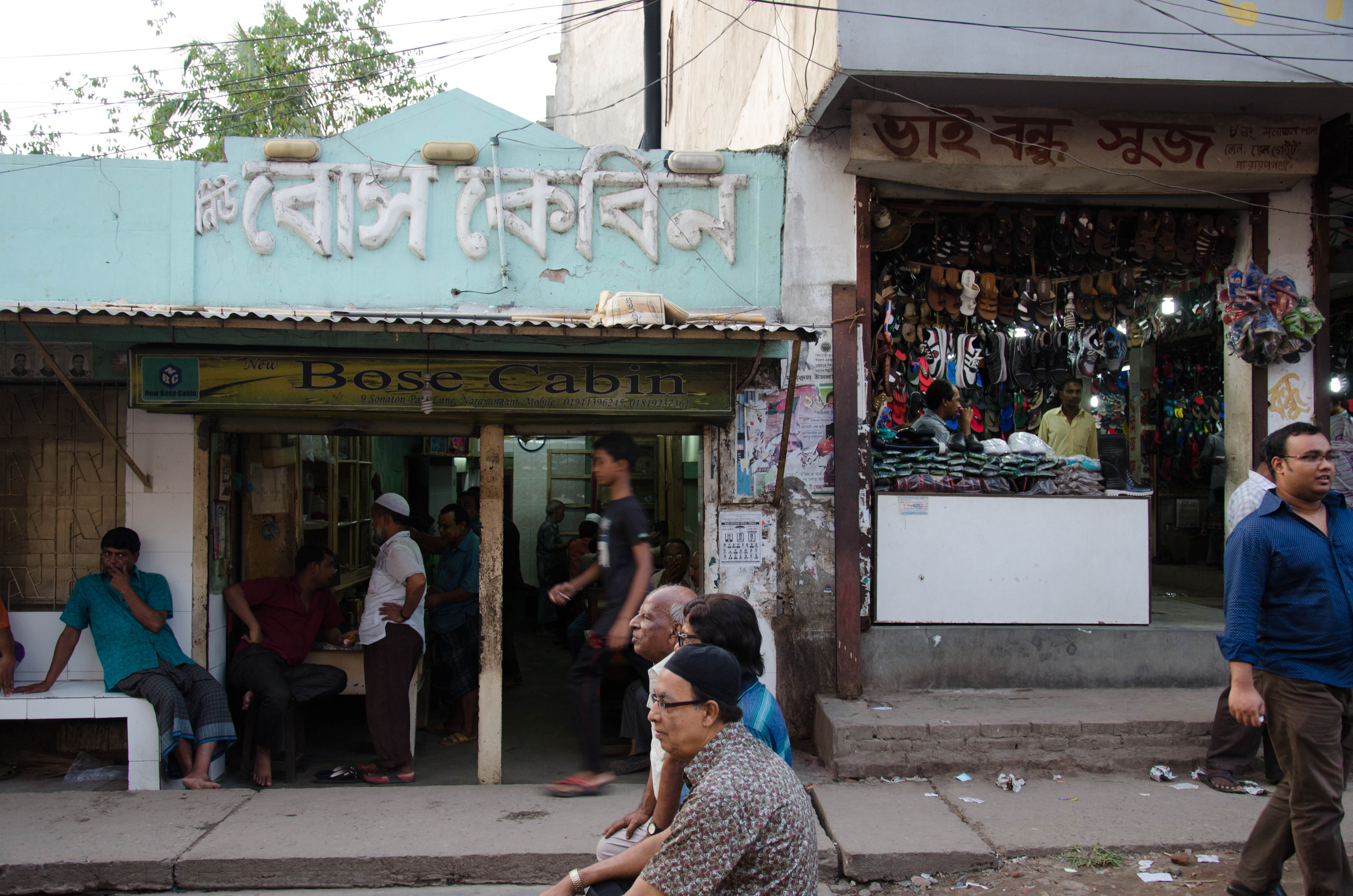

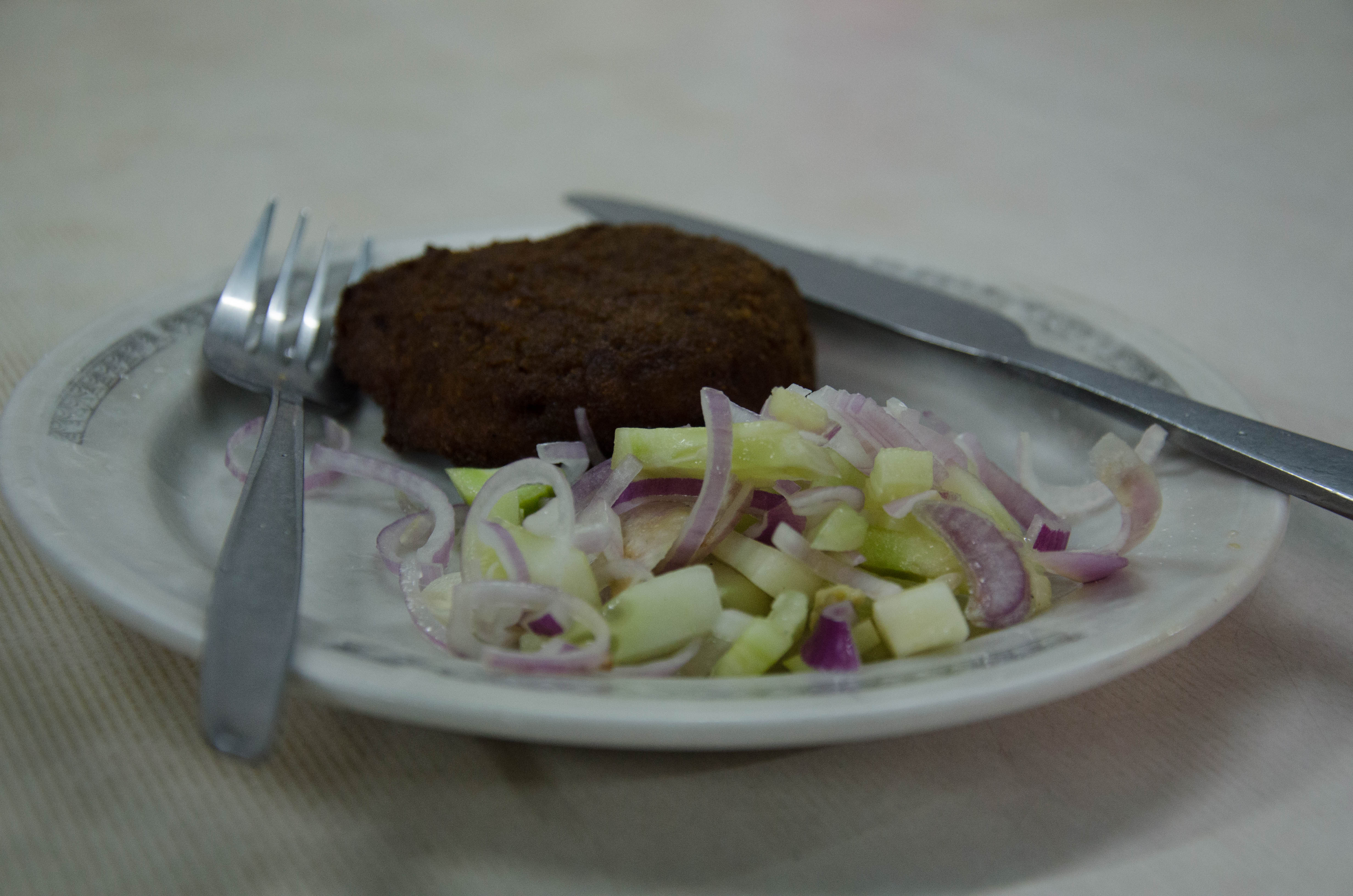

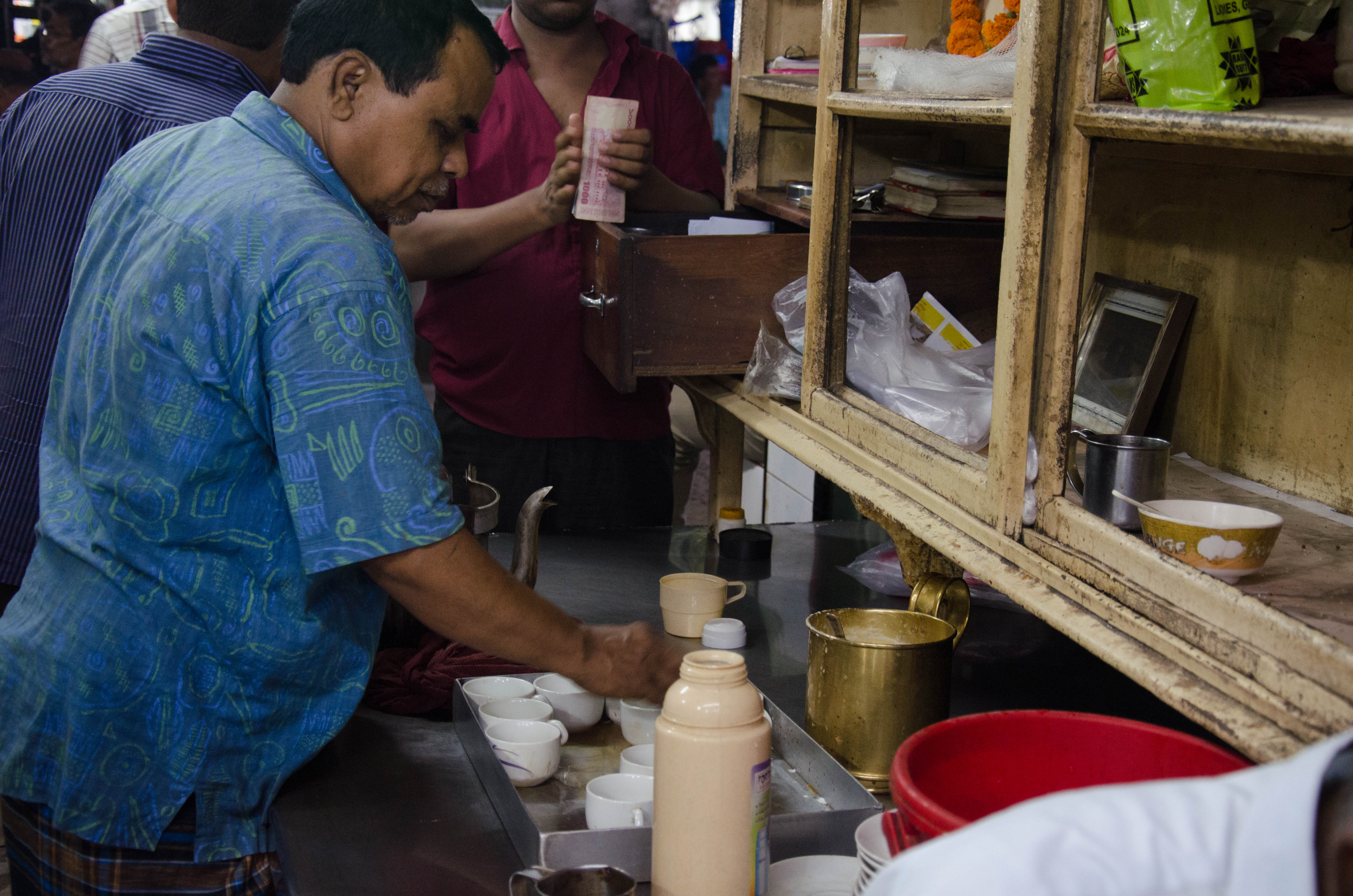
