= Bijoy 1971 =

Sculpture in India

- Bengali: বিজয় ১৯৭১
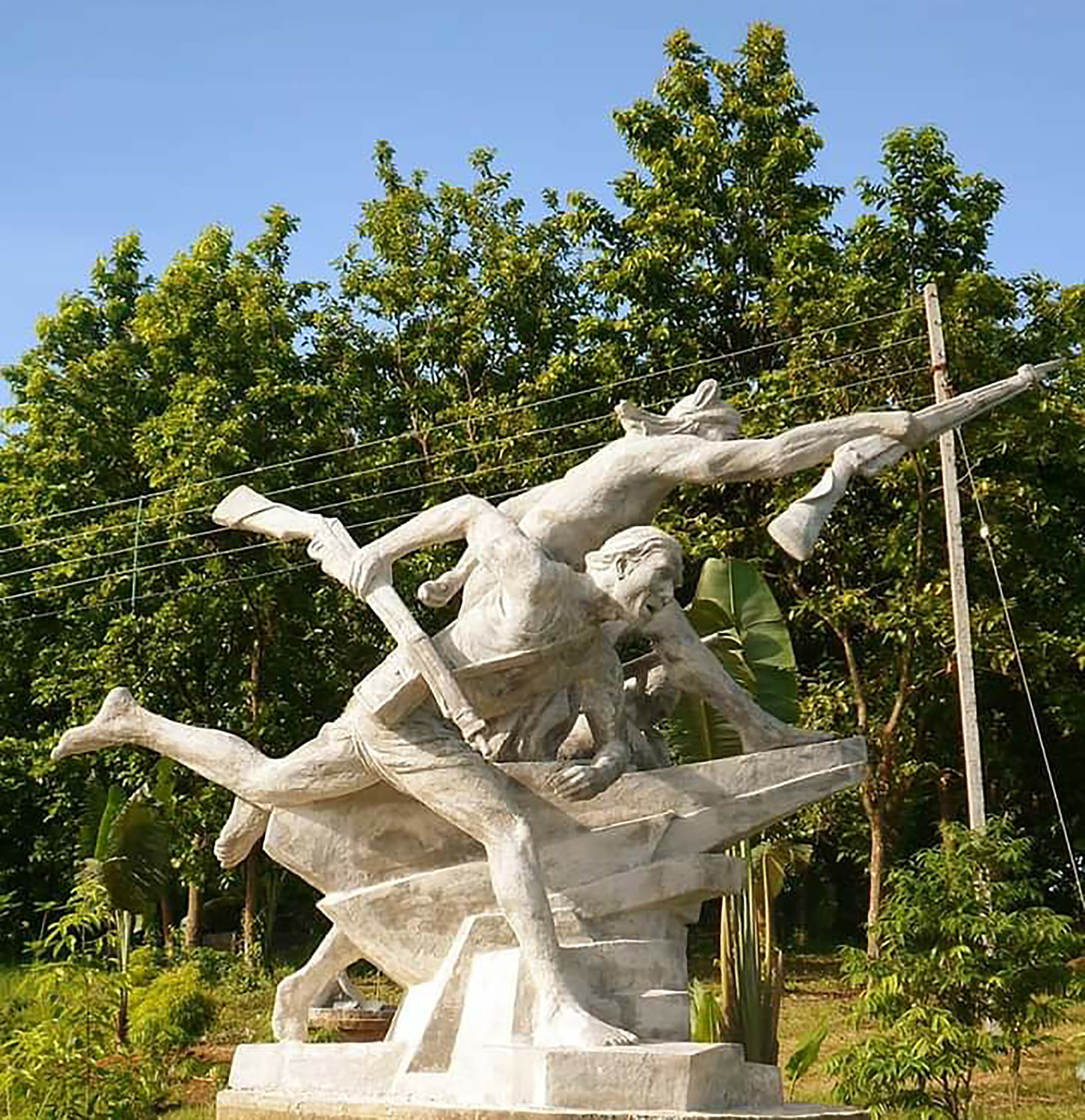
- Artist: Mahmudul Hasan Shohag
- Completion date: 2016
- Medium: concrete casting
- Location: Chottakhola, India
- 23°07′2.9″N 91°22′37.2″E

Bijoy 1971 (Bengali: বিজয় ১৯৭১) is a sculpture by Mahmudul Hasan Shohag in Bharat-Bangladesh Maitri Udyan on 2016. It is (12 feet) high and is located in Bharat-Bangladesh Maitri Udyan, India.

The sculptor tribute to Indian soldiers and Bangladeshi Freedom Fighters who sacrificed their lives during the Liberation War.
