= Quamrul Islam Siddique =

Bangladeshi engineer

- কামরুল ইসলাম সিদ্দিক
- Born: 20 January 1945; Nadia District, Bengal Presidency, British India (Now Kushtia District, Bangladesh)
- Died: 1 September 2008 (aged 63)
- Awards: Bangla Academy Fellowship (2007)

Quamrul Islam Siddique (20 January 1945 – 1 September 2008) was a Bangladeshi engineer and urban and regional planner. He was the founder and chief engineer of the Local Government Engineering Department (LGED). He is particularly known as the shaper of rural infrastructure in Bangladesh. He was awarded an honorary fellowship by the Bangla Academy in 2007 for his special contribution to engineering.

== Early life ==
Islam was born on 20 January 1945 in Kushtia. His father's name is Nurul Islam Siddique and mother's name is Begum Hamida Siddique. Quamrul is the second child of this couple. He completed primary in Kushtia and secondary in 1960. Later in 1962 he completed higher secondary from Kushtia College. In 1966, he obtained a civil engineering degree from East Pakistan University of Engineering and Technology (now Bangladesh University of Engineering and Technology). Graduated from the University of Sheffield with a Masters in Urban and Regional Planning in 1977.

== Work life ==
Quamrul Islam started his career in 1967 as Assistant Engineer of Kushtia Zilla Parishad. In 1971, when the Bangladesh War of Independence began, he joined the war on 30 April. As an engineer during the liberation war, he actively participated in war operations by designing various roads and bridges to support the liberation forces . From 1977 to 1985, he served first as the Deputy Chief Engineer of the Rural Program and later as the Supervising Engineer of the Urban Development Program under the Ministry of Local Government, Rural Development and Cooperatives. After working as an engineering adviser in the Bureau of Local Government Engineers until 1992, he established the Directorate of Local Government Engineers by carrying out structural reforms of the institution and was appointed as its chief engineer. He was its head till 1999.

He was Chairman of Bangladesh Power Development Board from 1999 to 2000, Secretary of Jamuna Bridge Division and Ministry of Communications in 2000, Secretary of Ministry of Housing and Public Works from 2000 to 2001, Chairman of Privatization Commission under Prime Minister's Office in 2001 and Executive of Dhaka Transport Coordination Authority from 2002 to 2004. Worked as a director.

He was the Chairperson of the Global Water Partnership-South Asia Region from 2003 to 2004.

== Personal life ==
Quamrul Islam was married to Sabera Siddique in his personal life. The couple has one son and three daughters. Quamrul died of cardiac arrest on 1 September 2008 in the United States at the age of 63.

== Awards ==
World Bank declared Quamrul Islam Siddique as the Person of the Year in 1999 by the 'International Road Federation' for his special contribution in the field of road communication in Bangladesh. His notable honors include:

- Bhasani Gold Medal (1995)
- Kavi Jasim Uddin Gold Medal (1995)
- IEB Gold Medal (1998)
- CR Das Gold Medal (1999)
- Abbas Uddin Gold Medal (1999)
- Sher-e-Bangla Gold Medal (2000)
- Bangabandhu Engineer Gold Medal (2000)
- JICA Merit Award (2000)
- American Institute of Civil Engineers Fellowship
- Bangla Academy Fellow (2007)
