= 1983 Anti-Majid Khan Education Policy movement =

Student movement in Bangladesh

Anti-Majid Khan Education Policy Movement
- Part of Student movements in Bangladesh
- Date: 1982–1983
- Location: Dacca, Chittagong and all over Bangladesh
- Caused by: Majid Khan Education Policy
- Result: Successful: Policy suspended; Students released

The Anti-Majid Khan Education Policy Movement was a historic student movement in Bangladesh during 1982–83. This movement was mainly carried out against the proposed education policy by the then military government's Education Advisor and Minister Abdul Majid Khan.

The movement arose in protest of alleged discrimination, commercialization, and communalization in the education system under the military government. Students, teachers, and ordinary citizens across the country organized large-scale protests against Abdul Majid Khan's proposed education policy. On 14 February 1983, the movement reached its peak when police fired on demonstrators in Dhaka, killing several students and ordinary people. Later, as a result of continued protest, the government was forced to suspend the education policy.

This event is considered a significant milestone in the democratic movement of Bangladesh. The movement holds special importance in the history of Bangladesh's education and democratic struggles.

== Background ==
After 1975, military rule began in Bangladesh. Political instability, restricted democratic rights, and the curtailment of freedom of speech created unease in society. In this context, General Hussain Muhammad Ershad imposed martial law and seized power in 1982. During his rule, efforts were made to introduce new policies and reforms in education, society, and politics. Among these was a new education policy led by Majid Khan, which sparked widespread debate, concern, and anger among students. In 1982, under the Ershad military government, Abdul Majid Khan became education advisor. Under his leadership, a new education policy was proposed. This policy gave importance to religious subjects and foreign languages, emphasized commercialization and affordability in higher education, and proposed changes to the duration of secondary education. Many students and prominent educators believed these changes would make the education system discriminatory and communal.

== Education policy ==
The education policy proposed on 23 September 1982 included the following:

- Bangla and Arabic would be compulsory from first grade, and English from second grade.
- Students would be responsible for 50% of the tuition and other costs for higher education. Those able to afford the fees could pursue higher education, even if their grades were low.
- The duration of lower secondary and secondary education would be extended to 12 years.
- More emphasis would be placed on religious subjects in the education system.

Students believed this policy would make education less accessible and more discriminatory for ordinary people, and would create communal divisions in society.

== History ==
=== Beginning ===
Soon after the new policy was announced, anger spread among students and academics. On 17 September 1982, on Education Day, students announced protests with three demands:

1. Repeal the anti-people Majid Khan education policy,
2. Release all students and political prisoners,
3. Withdraw martial law and restore democratic rights.

Student organizations across the country organized marches, rallies, human chains, and signature campaigns against the policy. On 8 November, during a police baton charge at the University of Dhaka, teachers and students were injured, and 30 people were arrested. Following this, the university was closed indefinitely. When the university reopened on 14 November, student organizations jointly announced further protest programs. On 21 November, the 'Chhatra Sangram Parishad' (Student Struggle Council) was formed, which led signature campaigns and public awareness activities against the policy throughout the country.

=== 14 February: clash and deaths ===
14 February 1983 was the day of the siege of the Secretariat, called by the Chhatra Sangram Parishad. Thousands of students marched peacefully towards the Secretariat, demanding withdrawal of the policy and a pro-people, science-based education system. Police blocked them near the High Court area. When the leaders started to speak, police used hot water cannons, batons, and tear gas. In the face of resistance, police opened fire. Zainal, an admission test candidate for the University of Dhaka, was shot and later killed with a police bayonet. Several other students and ordinary people, including a child named Dipali, were killed in the police firing. Many protesters were allegedly disappeared.

According to official figures, 1,331 people were arrested in this incident. The next day, 15 February, more students were killed in police firing at Jagannath College and other places. All educational institutions in Dhaka and Chattogram were closed. The movement then spread across the country.

=== Result ===
After the events of 14 and 15 February, the movement became even stronger. Under public pressure and from students and teachers, on 17 February, military ruler Ershad announced, "No final decision will be made about education without the opinion of the people." On 18 February, the education policy was suspended, and most arrested students were released.

== Legacy and impact ==
14 February was observed as the 'Autocracy Resistance Day' by the Bangladeshi opposition, until the Valentine's Day celebration became widespread in the country.

The movement is considered a milestone in the history of Bangladesh. By repealing the education policy, students showed that mass protest is the most effective resistance against any undemocratic policy. This movement set an example in establishing democratic values, the fight against discrimination in education, and the struggle for human rights in Bangladesh. Since then, the role of students in education, society, and politics has been viewed in a new light.

== Books ==
- Hasan, Mahfuz (2018). Education Movements in Bangladesh. Dhaka: Muktadhara.
- Student Movements in Bangladesh, Bangla Academy.
