= 1990 Bangladesh mass uprising =

Pro-democratic revolution in the South Asian country

ʼ90's Anti-Authoritarian Movement
- Part of Revolutions of 1989
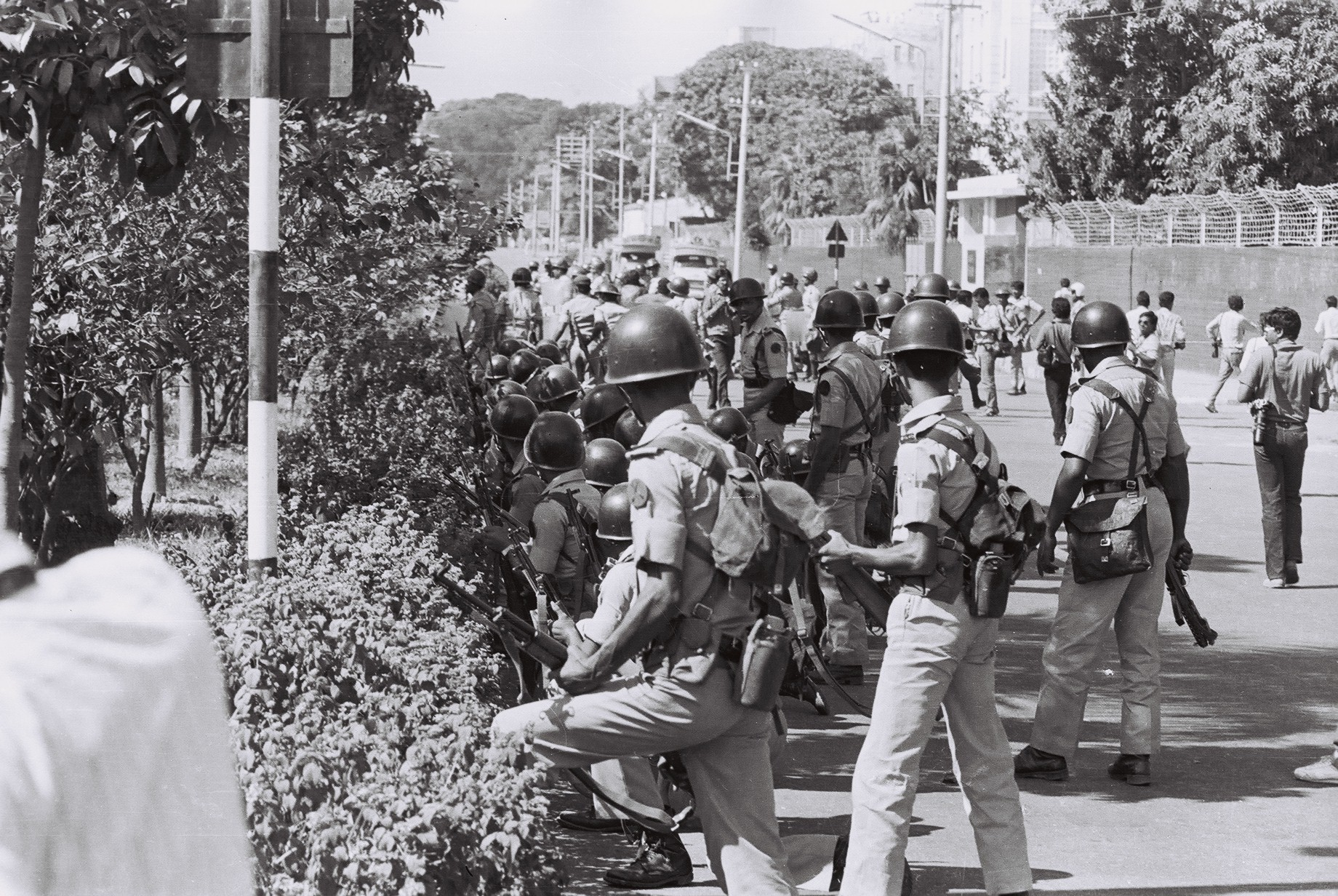
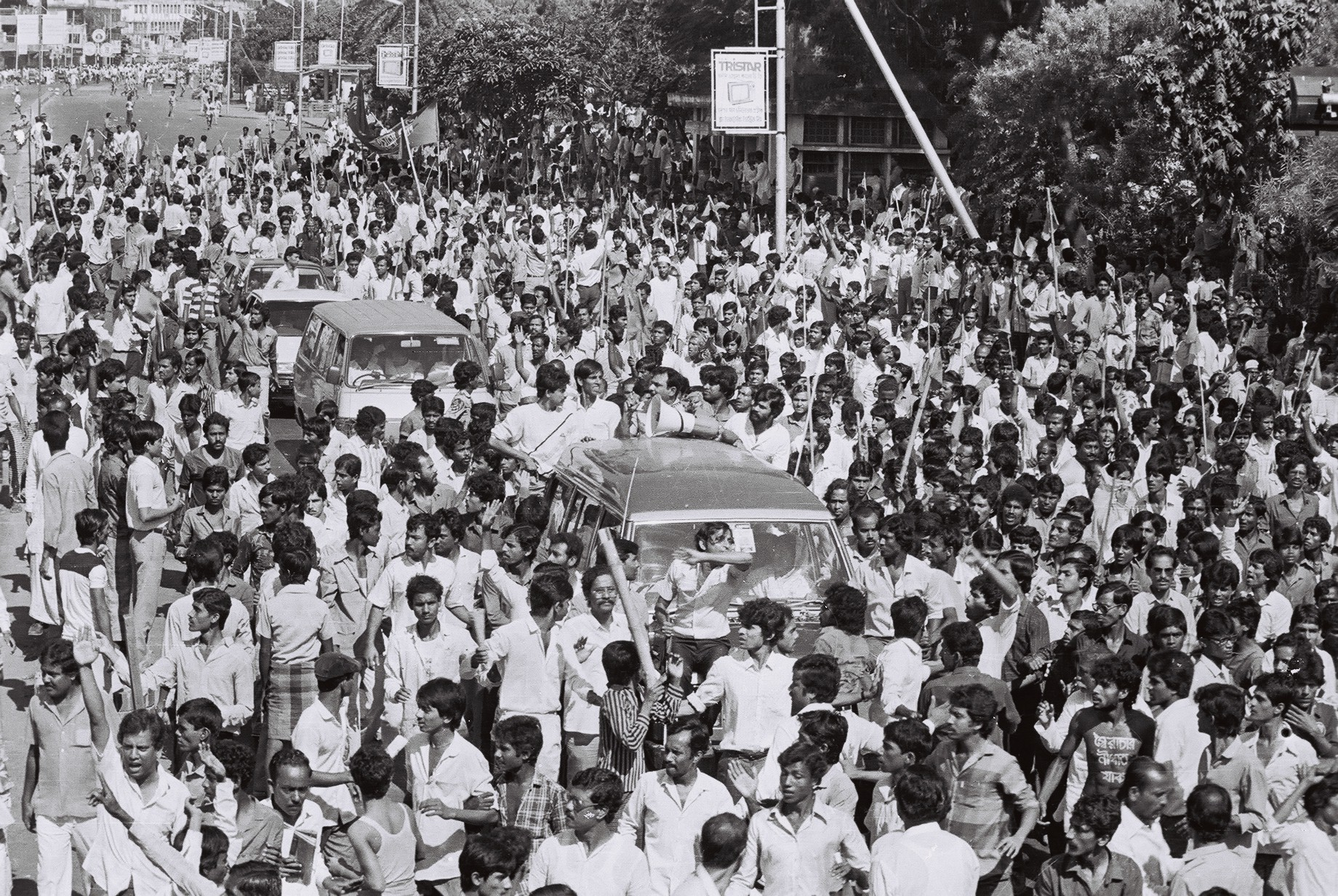
- Left: Bangladesh Rifles troops stationed in Dhaka, photographed by Dinu Alam on 10 November 1987. Right: Mass anti-government rally in Dhaka, 10 November 1987.
- Date: 10 October – 4 December 1990
- Location: Bangladesh
- Caused by: Authoritarianism; Dictatorship
- Result: Pro-democracy victory: Resignation of Hussain Muhammad Ershad; Restoration of parliamentary democracy; 1991 general election and Khaleda Zia and the Bangladesh Nationalist Party gain power

Parties
Pro-democracy activists; Bangladesh Nationalist Party; Awami League; Jamaat-e-Islami	Government of Bangladesh; Ministry of Home Affairs; Bangladesh Police; Bangladesh Rifles; Ministry of Defence; Bangladesh Armed Forces; Bangladesh Army; Jatiya Party

Lead figures
Khaleda Zia; Sheikh Hasina; Abbas Ali Khan	Hussain Muhammad Ershad

Casualties
- Deaths: ~100

A mass uprising took place in Bangladesh on 4 December 1990 and led to the fall of General Hussain Muhammad Ershad. The uprising, popularly known in Bangladesh as the ʼ90's Anti-Authoritarian Movement, (Note: Bengali: নব্বইয়ের স্বৈরাচারবিরোধী আন্দোলন) was the result of a series of popular protests that started on 10 October 1990 to topple General Ershad, who came to power in 1982 by imposing martial law and replaced a democratically elected president, Abdus Sattar, through a bloodless coup.

The uprising is marked as the starting point of parliamentary democracy in Bangladesh after nine years of military rule and paved the way for a credible election in 1991. The Bangladesh Nationalist Party-led 7-party alliance, the Bangladesh Awami League-led 8-party alliance, and the leftist 5-party alliance were instrumental in staging the uprising against Ershad.

About one hundred people died during the protests. Around fifty were casualties of violence and street fights that started from 27 November, after a state of emergency was declared. General Ershad was arrested immediately after the uprising on corruption charges.

== Background ==
=== Rise of Ershad ===
After the assassination of Ziaur Rahman on 30 May 1981, Vice-President Justice Abdus Sattar took over as the acting president of Bangladesh. Bangladesh Army Chief of Staff, Lieutenant General H. M. Ershad, extended his support to the acting President Sattar. However, General Ershad expressed in an interview with The Guardian that the military should have a defined role within the government and civil administration, a viewpoint that was rejected by the president.

Infuriated, General Ershad imposed martial law on 24 March 1982 and declared himself the Chief Martial Law Administrator. He replaced Justice Sattar with Justice A. F. M. Ahsanuddin Chowdhury as the President. On 11 April 1983, Hussain Muhammad Ershad suspended the constitution and declared himself the president of Bangladesh.

=== Political opposition ===
The first major opposition Ershad had to deal with was the Anti-Majid Khan Education Policy movement in 1983. Amid a state of emergency, hundreds of thousands of students gathered to protest the proposed Majid Khan education policy that was aimed at making Arabic a mandatory language to learn in primary level education. In the two days of street battles (14 and 15 February 1983) in the University of Dhaka, at least five died who were identified as Dipali Saha, Kanchan, Joynal, Mozammel, and Zafar. Since then, 14 February is observed as Anti-autocracy Day in Bangladesh.

Soon after the movement, the Awami League forged an alliance with 15 other parties, and the BNP forged an alliance with 7 other parties to resist the Ershad regime and launch a movement from September 1983. The movement was later slowed down due to the split in both parties and alliances.

=== General election 1986 ===
In March 1986, Ershad declared that a general election would be held on 7 May. The BNP-led 7-Party Alliance decided to boycott the election and declared nationwide strikes to foil the election. The 15-Party Alliance led by the Awami League initially declared a boycott of the election on 17 March 1986.

On 19 March at the Laldighi field of Chittagong, Sheikh Hasina declared:

We have no plan to participate in the upcoming poll. Those who will participate in this poll will be declared 'national betrayer'.

But later, on the night of 21 March 1986, Sheikh Hasina declared that the Awami League and 15-party alliance will join the election. Following the decision, five leftist parties, including the Workers' Party, Jatiya Samajtantrik Dal of the 15-party alliance, withdrew themselves from the alliance and decided to boycott the election with the 7-party alliance.

The participation of Awami League and its seven allies in the election gave a path for the next couple of years to the Ershad regime that had already created a new political party, the Jatiya Party, and weakened the anti-Ershad movement in the country.

=== Revival of the movement ===
After the defeat in the 1986 general elections, the Awami League-led 8-party alliance took to the streets once again, which bolstered the movement launched by the BNP-led 7-party alliance and leftist 5-party alliance in 1987.

The leaders of two major alliances of the time, Begum Khaleda Zia and Sheikh Hasina, decided to move for a unified movement against the Ershad regime after a meeting on 28 October 1987 at Mahakhali in the capital.

The movement reached a new peak in 1987 after the death of Nur Hossain, who died during a police firing on a Jubo League rally. The BNP, Awami League, and all other parties started nationwide agitation in response to the police excesses. But eventually the movement in 1987–88 did not see much success due to the repressive measures from the government, like the frequent house arrests of Begum Khaleda Zia and Sheikh Hasina.

== Students' movement ==
Student and civil society members also significantly contributed to the surge. The Dhaka University Central Students' Union (DUCSU) has always contributed the most in the courses of history of Bangladesh. But during the lack of foresight and betrayal by some of the DUCSU leaders in the 1980s, the anti-Ershad movement lost its appeal among the students.

In February 1989, the Bangladesh Chhatra League, Bangladesh Students Union, and the leftist student organisations led by Pinaki Bhattacharya gave a joint panel under Chatra Shangram Parishad (Students Action Council) that won the majority of the posts in the DUCSU election, and Sultan Mansur Ahmed became the vice-president of DUCSU. But this committee was proven as a failed one to challenge the regime and could not contribute much to the anti-Ershad movement.

In June 1990, the Amanullah Aman-Khairul Kabir Khokan panel, backed by Chatra Dal, won the DUCSU election in full panel as well as almost all the hall unions of the university. Amanullah Aman became the vice-president of the union with Khairul Kabir Khokan as the general secretary.

Routing all the organisation in the DUCSU election, Chatra Dal took the lead of the students' movement in the University of Dhaka campus.

DUCSU leaders and their followers, mostly Chatra Dal men, began holding rallies and sit-in programs in the campus area in 1990 in protest against the Ershad regime. The huge activist pool of Chatra Dal started participating in political programs declared by the three alliances from September 1990.

The Chatra Dal-led DUCSU committee forged an alliance with all existing students group on the campus, Sarbadaliya Chatra Oikya Parishad (All-party Students Council), and staged a demonstration on 1 October 1990. According to the military secretary of General Ershad during 1990, Major General Manjur Rashid Khan,

(...) ignoring the conflict and mistrust within the battling political parties, Sarbadaliya Chatra Oikya Parishad (All-party Students Council) became the driving force in the mass uprising.

The protests turned violent after the police firing on a rally of Chatra Dal on 10 October that claimed the life of Naziruddin Jehad, a Chatra Dal leader from Sirajganj who came to Dhaka to participate in the nationwide strike called by the three alliances against Ershad.

On 4 November, the council of students rallied at the Gulistan area of the capital, where they were met with police excesses. The students' alliance declared a siege of the colony of ministers on 17 November 1990. The program turned into a violent one when hundreds of students from the university campus locked into a battle with police that left hundreds of students injured. The student body on 21 November held another procession and locked in a clash with police.

On 27 November, during a program of the students council, armed cadres of the Jatiya Party opened fire on the students that ensued a gun battle with the armed cadres of Chatra Dal. While passing the Teacher-Students Centre (TSC) intersection of the University of Dhaka, physician Shamsul Alam Khan Milon was shot by the Jatiya Party cadres and later died. This incident enraged the students, and the council demanded the resignation of all ministers of the cabinet by 30 November and declared that if their demands are not met, the cabinet members would face dire consequences.

On the following day, the students came out from the campus with a rally that was attacked by police and BDR personnel. On 28 November, stick-welding students from the University of Dhaka staged a demonstration in surrounding areas of the campus. Students blocked the railway in Malibagh of the capital and forced the driver to stop the train and flee.

The series of student protests compelled the Ershad regime to think about a safe exit.

== Joint declaration ==
The BNP-led seven-party alliance, the Awami League-led 8-party alliance, and the leftist 5-party alliance drafted a "Joint Declaration of Three Alliance" on 19 November 1990.

This declaration was basically a roadmap outlining the process to hand over the presidency of Ershad to a civil government. The declaration included the idea of a caretaker government that would take over after the fall of Ershad and would hold a free and fair election within 90 days of its arrival to power.

The formula of replacing Ershad as the president was:

- Compelling Ershad to resign from his post and appoint the vice-president as his replacement
- The vice-president after being appointed as the president will appoint a person whose name will be proposed by the three alliances as the vice-president
- The vice-president turned president will resign from his post, appointing the newly appointed vice-president as his replacement
- The newly appointed president will take an oath as the president and will form a ten-member advisory council
- The president and his advisory council will have to hold a free and fair election within 90 days

== Timeline ==
- 10 October 1990

Nationwide strike observed by the BNP-led 7-party alliance, the Awami League-led 8-party alliance, and the leftist 5-party alliance.

The strike claimed 5 lives, including the three BNP activists who were rallying in front of the central office of the Jatiya Party and succumbed to death when the Jatiya Party cadres opened fire on the crowd.

- 14 October 1990

Action Day observed by the BNP-led 7-party alliance, the Awami League-led 8-party alliance, and the leftist 5-party alliance.

- 16 October 1990

Half-day nationwide strike observed by the BNP-led 7-party alliance, the Awami League-led 8-party alliance, and the leftist 5-party alliance. Awami League declared a series of political programs demanding the resignation of Ershad

- 27 October 1990

Nationwide bus-rail blockade observed by the BNP-led 7-party alliance, the Awami League-led 8-party alliance, and the leftist 5-party alliance

- 4 November 1990

Police attack students rally in the Gulistan area of the capital, more than fifty students receive injury

- 5 November 1990

Siege the Radio-Television building program observed by the BNP-led 7-party alliance, the Awami League-led 8-party alliance, and the leftist 5-party alliance

- 10 November 1990

24-hour-long nationwide strike observed by the BNP-led 7-party alliance, the Awami League-led 8-party alliance, and the leftist 5-party alliance, another 48-hour nationwide strike declared

- 17 November 1990

Siege the Minister's colony observed. Hundreds of students from the university campus locked into a battle with police while advancing towards Minister's colony at the Mintoo Road area. Around one hundred students injured

- 19 November 1990

The three alliances provide a roadmap for the handover of power in a joint declaration

- 20 November 1990

24-hour-long nationwide strike observed by the three alliances, claimed two lives, leaving hundreds injured Residence of Begum Khaleda Zia came under attack during the strike

- 21 November 1990

The student body on 21 November held another procession and locked in a clash with police

- 27 November 1990

Shamsul Alam Khan Milon killed by Jatiya Party (Ershad) cadres on the university campus Censorship imposed on the newspapers enabling strict monitoring, newspaper owners and journalists decided not to publish newspapers from the very next day

Ershad declares state of emergency, curfew imposed

- 28 November 1990

Students defy curfew, stick-welding students hold rowdy processions all around the capital

Opposition leaders address a rally at Shahid Minar

Railway blocked at Malibagh, driver flee leaving the train on the line

- 29 November 1990

All the teachers of the University of Dhaka, led by the Vice-Chancellor M. Maniruzzaman Miah, declared they would resign from their posts and would not return to classes until the resignation of Ershad

- 1 December 1990

In the Mirpur area of the capital, the BDR (now Border Guards Bangladesh) opened fire on a crowd that was rallying in support of a nationwide shutdown called by the opposition parties that claimed five lives. In Kazipara of the capital, two died in police excesses

In the port city Chittagong, a labour leader died when the Bangladesh Army men opened fire on a rowdy procession of the labour groups

A rickshaw-puller died during a clash in Narayanganj that day

During the night, five died in Mirpur, including a student and two labourers

One succumbed to his injuries in the Nilkhet area of the capital at night

- 2 December 1990

General Ershad, in a public address. called for both parliamentary and presidential elections as soon as possible

- 3 December 1990

Bombs were hurled at the Bangladesh Army-controlled Sena Kalyan Sangstha building at Motijhil

- 6 December 1990

Hundreds of thousands of people rally in the streets of Dhaka, the capital of Bangladesh paralysed.

Ershad submitted his resignation, accepting the demands of the parties.

== See also ==
- Non-cooperation movement (2024)
- 1969 East Pakistan mass uprising
