= Gonohotta 1971 =

Sculpture in India

- Bengali: গণহত্যা ১৯৭১
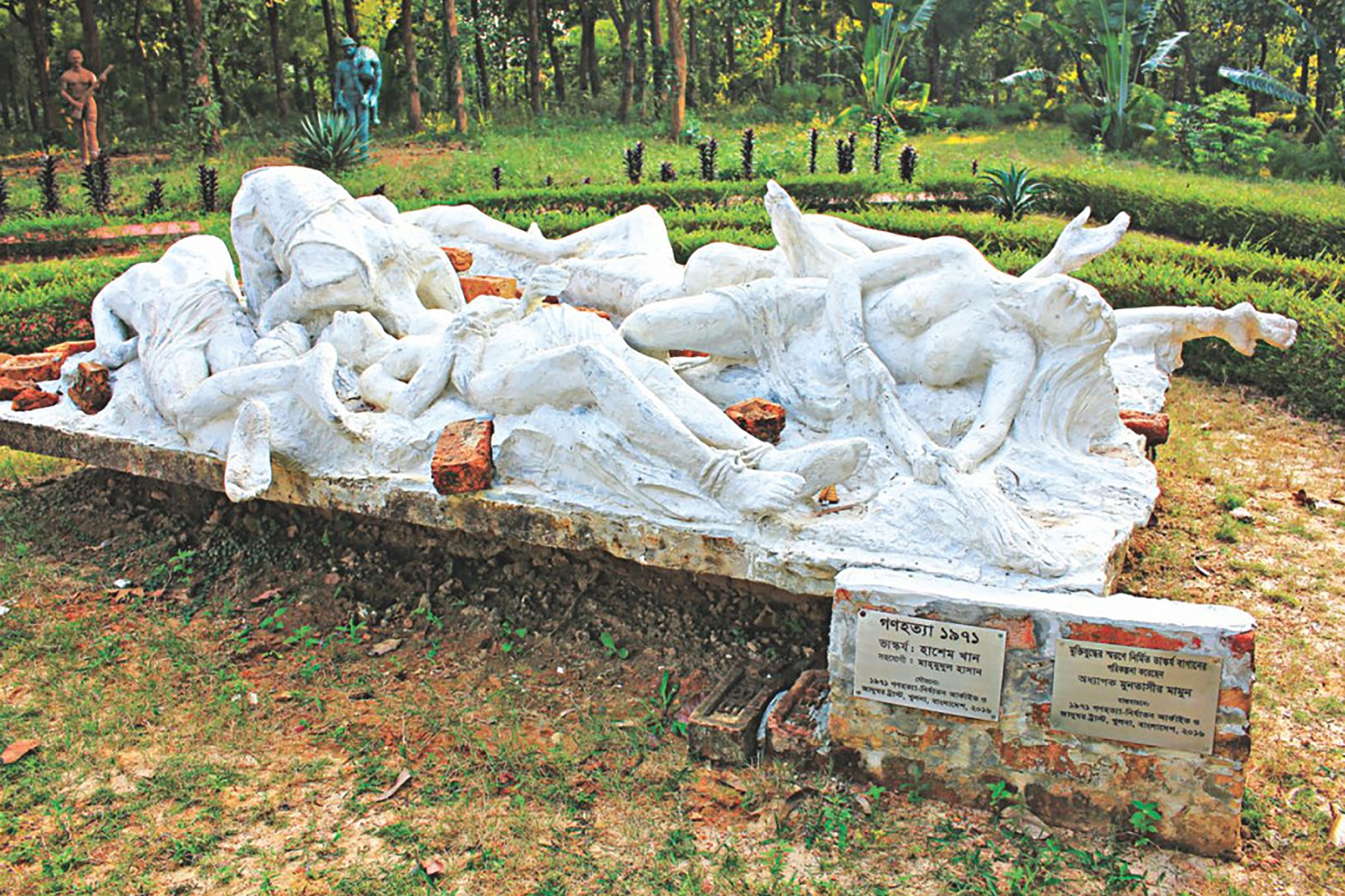
- Artist: Hashem Khan, Mahmudul Hasan Shohag
- Completion date: 11 November 2010
- Medium: Concrete casting
- Location: Bharat-Bangladesh Maitri Udyan, India

Gonohotta 1971 (Bengali: গণহত্যা ১৯৭১, lit. 'Genocide 1971') is a sculpture by Hashem Khan collaborating with Mahmudul Hasan Shohag in Bharat-Bangladesh Maitri Udyan on 2017.

It is 15 feet (4.6 m) long by 9 feet (2.7 m) wide and is 5 feet (1.5 m) high and is located in Bharat-Bangladesh Maitri Udyan, India.
