= Mohammad Saidur Rahman =

Mohammad Saidur Rahman (28 January 1940 – 3 March 2007) was a Bangladeshi writer, journalist, and folklorist.

== Early life ==
Rahman was born on 28 January 1940 in Binnogaon, Kishoreganj District, East Bengal, British India. He studied at the Binnogaon Primary School, Tomaltola Primary School, Kishoreganj Minor School, and Azimuddin High School. He was involved with communist politics as a student.

== Career ==
Rahman worked as a local correspondent of the Weekly Purbadesh and the Weekly Chitrali. He worked as the editor of the Kishoreganj Barta. In February 1957, he attended the historic Kagmari Conference of Awami League. He joined Bangla Academy in July 1962. He collected folk artifacts for the academy. He helped establish the Folk Art museum in the Bangla Academy. He established a Folk Arts Museum in Binnogoan. In 1974, his work was exhibited at the Bangla Academy, and in 1988 they were exhibited at the Open Air Exhibition of White Chapel Art Gallery. In 2001, he was awarded the Bangla Academy Fellowship.

== Death ==
Rahman died on 3 March 2007.
