= A. Majeed Khan =

Bangladeshi educationist

A. Majid Khan
- এ মজিদ খান

Minister of Planning
- In office 1 June 1984 – 4 August 1985
- Prime Minister: Ataur Rahman Khan
- Preceded by: Abul Maal Abdul Muhith
- Succeeded by: Major General Shamsul Haque

Minister of Education
- In office 26 May 1982 – 1 June 1984
- Preceded by: Tafazzal Hossain Khan
- Succeeded by: Shamsul Huda Chaudhury

Personal details
- Born: 1 July 1929 Faridpur, Bengal Province, British India
- Died: 26 April 2023 (aged 93) Dhaka, Bangladesh
- Education: Hamline University (DHL)

A. Majid Khan (1 July 1929 – 26 April 2023) was a Bangladeshi educationist. He had served as an ambassador of Bangladesh to France, Spain and Morocco. He also served as cabinet minister for education and planning. He was founder of Independent University, Bangladesh and University of Information Technology and Sciences. He worked as a visiting professor and senior Fulbright fellow at Hamline University, and served as a resident fellow in the Department of Rural Sociology at the University of Wisconsin. He also taught at various universities in the Netherlands, Sweden, and Jordan. Dr. Khan served as Bangladesh's ambassador to France, Spain, and Morocco, as well as the permanent representative of Bangladesh to UNESCO. The Majid Khan Education Commission was formed in his name in 1983, but was suspended following student protests.

== Early life ==
Khan was born on 1 July 1929 in Faridpur in the then British India. He was educated in Kolkata, London, and Minnesota. He was the first Bangladeshi to earn PhD degree in sociology and anthropology. He earned the Doctor of Humane Letters degree from Hamline University in Minnesota.

== Career ==
Khan served as a senior Fulbright fellow at Hamline University and a resident fellow in the Department of Rural Sociology at the University of Wisconsin. He was a faculty member at the universities in the Netherlands, Sweden and Jordan.

Khan was a member of the executive board and Permanent Representative to UNESCO.

Khan was awarded with the Officer de l'ordre des Palmes Académiques by France for his contribution to education, science and culture.

== Death ==
Khan died while undergoing treatment at the Evercare Hospital Dhaka in Dhaka on 26 April 2023.
