= AKM Shahidul Haque (journalist) =

Bangladeshi journalist

- Occupation: Journalist
- Awards: Ekushey Padak

AKM Shahidul Haque was a Bangladeshi journalist who served as the editor of now defunct The Bangladesh Times. He was awarded Ekushey Padak in 1989 by the Government of Bangladesh.

== Personal life ==
Haque was married to Kazi Shamsun Nahar (d. 2017), a short-story writer. Together they had a son, Shahriar Shahid (d. 2018), who served as the managing director of Bangladesh Sangbad Sangstha.
