= Tejosh Halder Josh =

Bangladeshi sculptor

- তেজস হালদার যশ
- Born: 4 July 1982 (age 44); Gopalganj, Bangladesh
- Awards: Ekushey Padak

Tejosh Halder Josh (born 4 July 1982) is a Bangladeshi sculptor. In 2026, he was awarded with the Ekushe Padak, for his special contribution to Sculpture.

== Early life ==
Josh was born in Gopalganj. He first studied at Dhaka Residential Boarding School. He earned his BFA and MFA in sculpture respectively from the Institute of Fine Arts (now Faculty of Fine Arts, University of Dhaka) in 2007 and Visva-Bharati University, India in 2010.

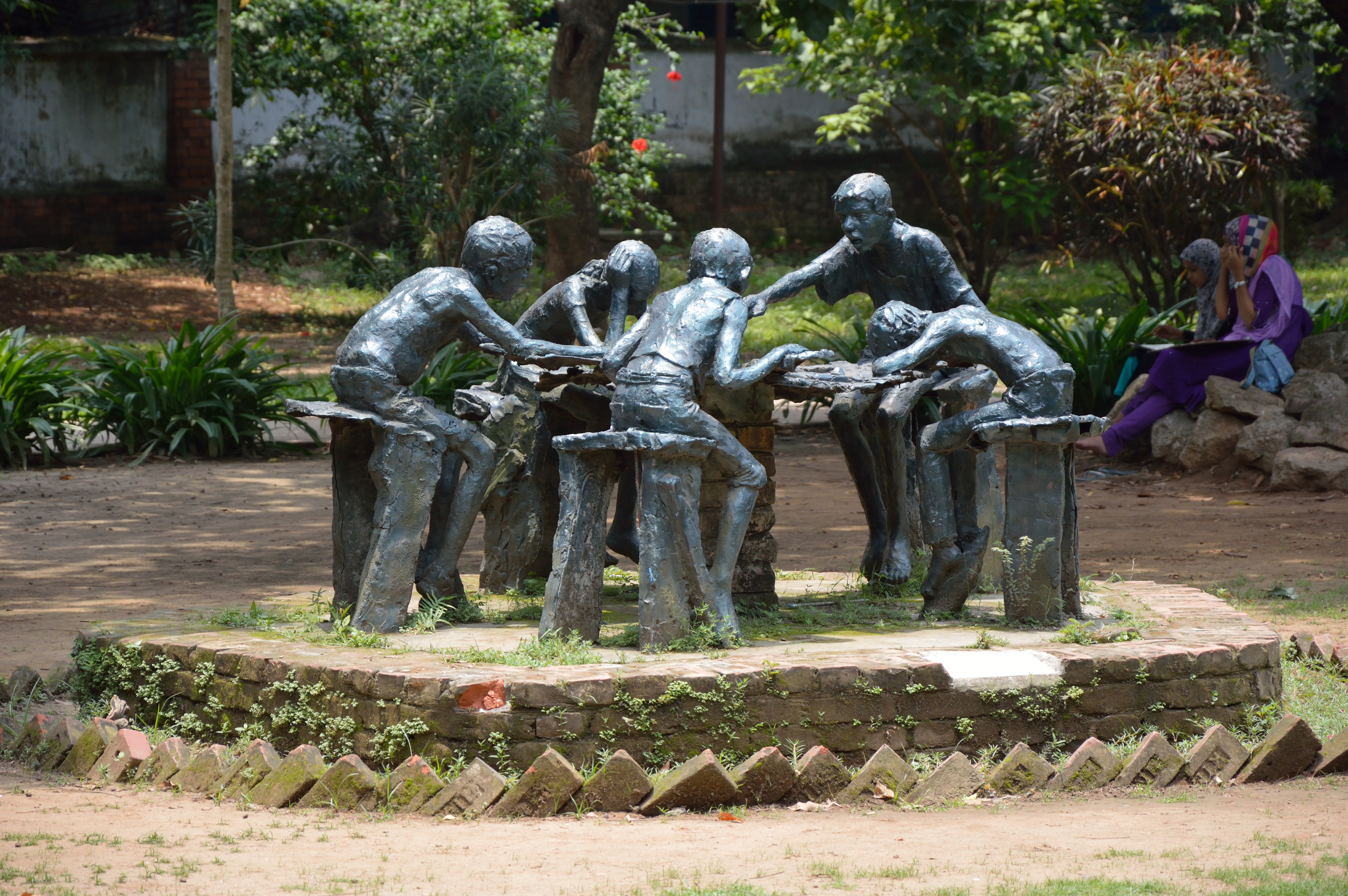
Serious Discussion - a work by Josh at the University of Dhaka

== Work ==
Josh mostly works with metal.

== Awards ==
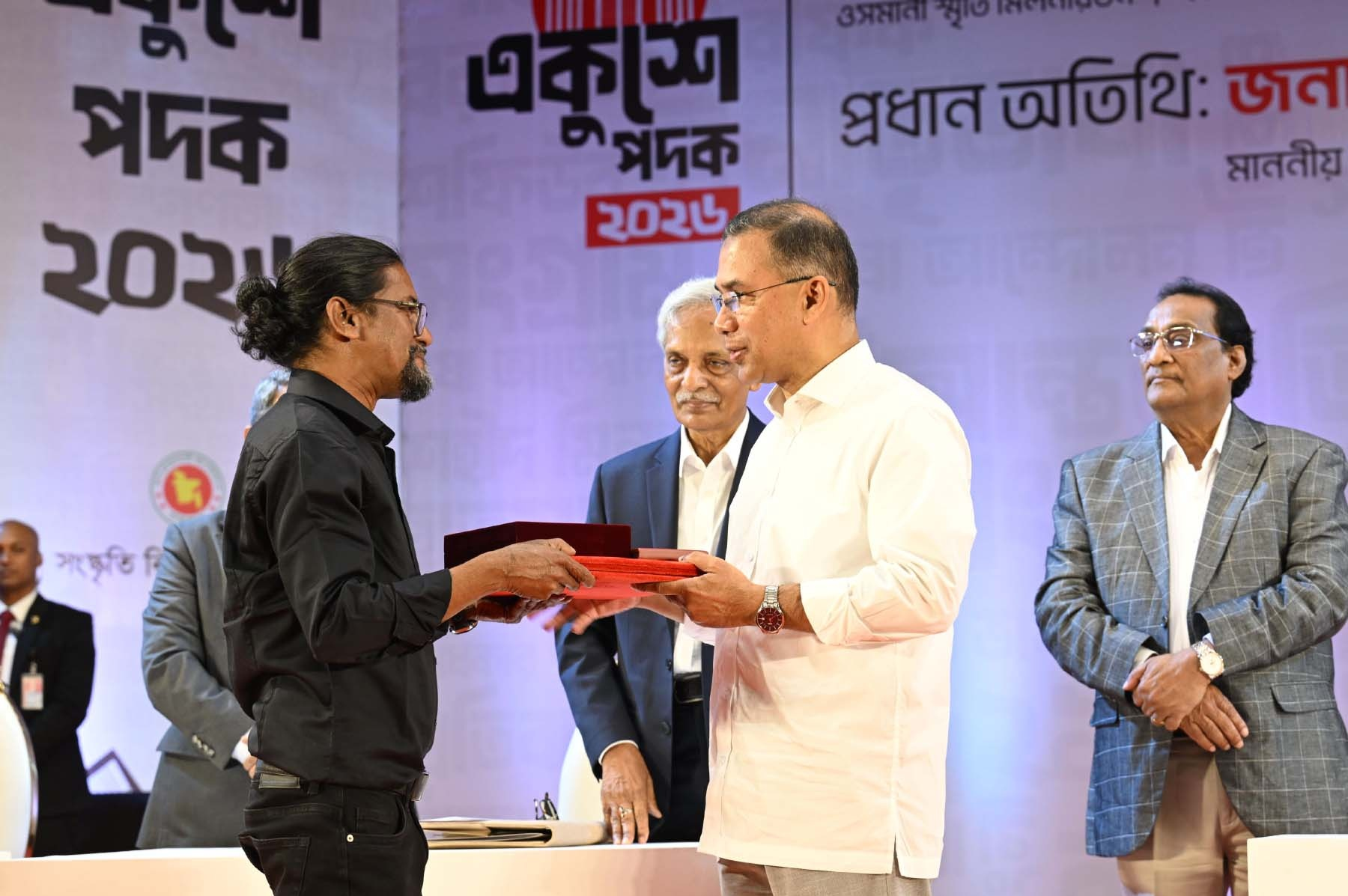
Josh receiving the Ekushey Padak, 2026

- Shilpacharya Joynul Abedin Gold medal at the Institute of Fine Art, University of Dhaka (2005)
- Honorable prize at the 12th Asian Art Biennale, Bangladesh (2007)
- Bengal Foundation Scholarship (2008, 2009, 2010)
- Scholarship at Kalabhavana Visva Bharati, Shantiniketan, India (2010)
- Ekushey Padak (2026)
