= Nidarabad murder case =

1989 murder case in Bangladesh

Nidarabad murder case নিদারাবাদ হত্যাকাণ্ড
- Location: Nidarabad, Brahmanbaria, Bangladesh
- Date: 6 September 1989 (UTC+6:00)
- Target: Bengali Hindu Debnath family
- Weapon: Knife
- Deaths: 6 (pregnant woman and five children)
- Perpetrator: Land sharks

Nidarabad massacre (Bengali: নিদারাবাদ হত্যাকাণ্ড) refers to the murder of Birajabala Debnath and her children by a mob in Nidarabad, Bangladesh, on 6 September 1989.

== Background ==
The village of Nidarabad in under Harashpur Union of Nasirnagar Upazila in Brahmanbaria District in Bangladesh. The Debnaths were a poor Hindu family belonging to the Yogi caste. Shashanka and Birajabala Debnath had three daughters and two sons and they were expecting their sixth child. The eldest daughter Suniti was married. Shashanka Debnath earned the family livelihood by selling moa, a kind of crunchy ball made of puffed rice and jaggery. Their family assets consisted of the meagre ancestral land.

A group of local land sharks led by one Tajul Islam were repeatedly threatening the Bengali Hindu family to leave their ancestral land and emigrate to India. However, the Debnath family stood their ground and refused to leave their ancestral property. On 16 October 1987, Shashanka Debnath was abducted and killed. His dismembered body was disposed of in a nearby village. Shashanka's body was not found and he was assumed to be missing. During this time, one of the killers tried to take possession of the land using a forged deed. Birajabala then lodged a complaint at the police for the attempted forgery and her husband's murder.

== Killings ==
After the midnight of 6 September 1989, a group of 15 to 20 men broke into the Debnaths' home. They abducted Birajabala and her five children at gunpoint and carried them off. A boat was waiting for them, into which they were boarded forcefully. The kidnappers then sailed to the Dhopajhuri beel. Then the kidnappers forced the captives to disembark on the bank of the beel.

One of the attackers brandished lethal knife on Birajabala, whence she begged for her life. Unmoved, the attacker killed 45-year-old Birajabala Debnath in front of her five minor children, who started shivering in terror. Her body was then cut into pieces and stuffed them into an oil barrel packed with salt and lime. After that, they cut the eldest daughter, 17-year-old Niyati, as the other children repeated begged for their lives. One by one they cut youngest daughter, 13-year-old Pranati, followed by Subhas 13, Suman 7, and Sujan, the youngest son who was just 23 months old. Their bodies too were similarly stuffed in oil barrels packed with lime and salt and dumped in the water body. On 14 September 1989, their dead bodies were accidentally discovered when one of the barrels rose up to the water surface and collided with a boat.

== Trial ==
On 28 September 2012, one of criminals, Idris Patwari, was arrested by from his home in Bagdiya village and sentenced.
