= Naziruddin Jehad =

Bangladeshi activist

Najiruddin Jehad (6 September 1969 – 10 October 1990) was an activist of the pro-democracy movement of Bangladesh that led to the 1990 Mass Uprising in Bangladesh. Jehad, the first casualty of the 1990 Mass Uprising in Bangladesh was killed on 10 October due to the police excesses during the first nationwide strike of the full-fledged movement against Ershad in front of Dainik Bangla intersection of capital Dhaka.

His death added fuel to the fire of the full-fledged movement, unified the students of all organisations and led to the fall of Hussain Muhammad Ershad on 4 December 1990. To commemorate his contribution to democracy, Bangladesh Nationalist Party (BNP) and its students wing observe 10 October each year as Shahid Jehad Day.

== Early life and education ==
Naziruddin Jehad was born on 6 September 1969, at Nabogram village under Ullapara upazila of Sirajganj district to his father K. M. Mahmud and mother Basirunnesa. Mr. Mahmud and Mrs. Basirunnesa had 10 children and among them Jehad was ninth in line. Jehad after passing his SSC and Higher Secondary School Certificate examinations joined Government Akbar Ali College of Sirajganj in 1988.

== Political career ==
Naziruddin Jehad, an ardent admirer of President Ziaur Rahman, joined Government Akbar Ali College unit of Bangladesh Jatiotabadi Chatra Dal in 1988. After joining Chatra Dal, he focused on strengthening the organisation of the wing both in the college and in Ullapara upazila. With his relentless effort, Chatra Dal created a strong foothold in both Government Akbar Ali College and Ullapara upazila.

Jehad played a crucial role in mobilising public support against military strongman Hussain Muhammad Ershad in his district. He was active in the political programs declared by Bangladesh Nationalist Party as a leader of its student wing from 1988. For his contribution to the party, he was elected as the president of Government Akbar Ali College unit Chatra Dal and the vice-president of its Ullapara upazila unit in 1990.

== Beginning of the mass uprising ==
After eight years of relentless movement, BNP led 7-party alliance and Awami League led 8-party alliance and leftist 5-party alliance started a full-fledged joint movement from 10 October 1990 by declaring a nationwide strike on the day with a view to usurping General Ershad from the power.

On 10 October 1990, hundreds and thousands of protesters both from BNP and Awami League ran riot on the streets of Dhaka. A large pool of activists of BNP and its associate bodies were demonstrating in the Paltan area of the capital that day. A clash ensued in the area when police attacked the demonstrators and opened fire on the crowd that claimed two lives.

Another incident of firing took place in front of Jatiya Party office and claimed another three lives when the armed goons of Jatiya Party attacked the BNP rally.

== Death ==
Naziruddin Jehad came from Sirajganj with a group of around a hundred activists to join the party declared program that day and was leading the demonstration in Paltan area. When police opened fire over the crowd, Jehad received a bullet injury and was rushed to Bangabandhu Sheikh Mujib Medical University. He died on 10 October 1990.

Police tried to snatch away the body of Jehad from the hospital but a large number of doctors led by Shamsul Alam Khan Milon resisted the attempt but failed to save the life of Jehad, who became the first martyr of the uprising.

Shamsul Alam Khan Milon in his diary wrote the incident and recalled what he said before his death. Jehad said:

I came to join the movement against autocracy but now I am dying without seeing its fall. My soul will rest in peace when the autocratic regime is ousted.

== Aftermath ==
The death of Naziruddin Jehad enraged the Bangladesh Jatiotabadi Chatra Dal and Bangladesh Nationalist Party observe 10 October as Shahid Jehad Dibash (Martyred Jehad Day). Former Prime Minister Khaleda Zia said The mass upsurge took place in that year on his (Jahed) blood and it ultimately caused Ershad's ouster.

Bangladesh Jatiotabadi Chatra Dal forged an alliance with all other active student organisations in the campus under Sarbadaliya Chatra Oikya Parishad (All-party Students Council) to give a final blow to the Ershad government. This student body played a vital role in paralysing the country within two months and forced Ershad to resign on 4 December 1990.

A monument was built in the Dainik Bangla intersection as Jehad Memorial of the capital Dhaka where Jehad was shot.
