= 1983 Majid Khan Education Commission =

Commission of the military government of Bangladesh

The Majid Khan Education Commission was a national commission formed in 1983 during the military rule of Hussain Muhammad Ershad, with the aim of reforming Bangladesh's education system. The commission, led by the then Education Adviser Abdul Majid Khan, put forward several proposals and recommendations to restructure the education system, redefine educational goals, and modernize the framework in line with national needs. Based on the commission's report, a new education policy called the Majid Khan Education Policy 1983 was announced. This policy later sparked widespread debate and protests.

== Background ==
After 1975, during the period of military rule, Bangladesh's education sector faced various challenges, such as declining standards, inequality, and allegations of not meeting the demands of the modern era. To provide new direction in education, the Ershad government formed a commission under the leadership of Abdul Majid Khan. The commission's purpose was to reorganize the education structure in line with the country's socio-economic realities, values, and development strategies.

== Formation ==
The commission included educationists, government officials, specialists, and representatives from various relevant sectors. The commission collected and reviewed education-related information from different regions of the country, and gathered opinions from people at different levels. The final report was submitted in September 1982.

== Recommendations ==
Some major recommendations in the commission's report were—

- Restructuring primary and secondary education: Proposal to extend the duration of primary and secondary education to a total of 12 years.
- Language education: Recommendation to make Bangla and Arabic compulsory from grade one, and English compulsory from grade two.
- Financial participation in higher education: Suggestion that students should bear 50% of the costs of university-level education, with scholarships available for poor and disadvantaged students.
- Greater emphasis on religious education: Inclusion of religious subjects alongside general education, with focus on moral education.
- Technical and vocational education: Recommendation to expand technical, vocational, and science-based education according to labor market needs.
- Defining the aims of education: Linking the goals of education to personality development, patriotism, and economic progress.

== Criticism ==
Right after the commission's recommendations and the proposed education policy were published, there were a variety of reactions from educationists, students, and teachers' organizations. Many felt that this policy risked increasing inequality, commercialization, and religious influence in education, which could go against public interest and communal harmony. In particular, the decisions to give priority to financial ability in higher education and to increase religious content were the most controversial.

== Legacy and evaluation ==
Although the Majid Khan Education Commission was a significant initiative in Bangladesh's history of education reform, its recommended policy faced intense protests and was suspended. Even so, many of the commission's observations and suggestions were considered in later education policy reforms and improvements. The experience of this commission set an example for the importance of democratic discussions in policy making, and for ensuring equality and inclusiveness in Bangladesh's education system.

== See also ==
- Education System in Bangladesh
- 1983 Anti-Majid Khan Education Policy movement
