= Lutful Haider Chowdhury =

Professor Lutful Haider Chowdhury

Personal details
- Relations: Mufazzal Haider Chaudhury
- Awards: Ekushey Padak –1990

Lutful Haider Chowdhury was a Bangladeshi essayist, researcher of Bengali language and literature, educationist and intellectual. In 1990, the government of Bangladesh awarded him the Ekushey Padak, the state's second-highest civilian honour, for his contribution to education.

Chowdhury's elder brother, Mufazzal Haider Chaudhury, was a professor at the University of Dhaka who was killed in the Bangladesh Liberation War.

== Awards ==
- Ekushey Padak (1990)
