= Abdul Ghani Hazari =

Bangladeshi poet and journalist

- Born: 12 January 1921; Nayagram village, Pabna District, Bengal Presidency, British India
- Died: 1976
- Education: Calcutta University
- Occupations: Poet, journalist

Abdul Ghani Hazari (12 January 1921 – 1976) was a Bangladeshi poet and journalist. He was awarded Ekushey Padak by the Government of Bangladesh in 1990.

== Education and career ==
Hazari got his bachelor's in Philosophy from Calcutta University in 1944. He started his journalistic career in 1947 when he joined Alodan, a weekly magazine published from Kolkata, as an editor.

== Works ==
- Samanya Dhan (1959)
- Katipay Amlar Stri (1965)
- Suryer Sindi (1965)
- Jagrata Pradip (1970)
- Svarnagardabh (1964)
- Froider Manahsamiksa (1975)
- Kalpenchar Diary (1976)

== Awards ==
- UNESCO Award (1964)
- Bangla Academy Literary Award (1972)
- Ekushey Padak (1990)
