= Devdas Chakraborty =

Bangladeshi artist

- Born: 1933; Faridpur, Bengal Presidency, British India
- Died: February 4, 2008 (aged 74–75); Dhaka, Bangladesh
- Spouse: Saleha
- Children: 2

Devdas Chakraborty (c. 1933 – February 4, 2008) was a Bangladeshi artist. He was awarded Ekushey Padak by the Government of Bangladesh for his contribution to fine arts in 1990.

== Career ==
Chakraborty joined as a faculty member of the Department of Fine Arts at the University of Chittagong in 1973. After the death of his wife, he left his position at the university.

== Works ==
Chakraborty began painting in oil and watercolor mediums. His initial works were figurative, and then in semi-abstracted and abstract. He later switched his interest to drawing and subsequently in printmaking.

== Personal life ==
Chakraborty believed strongly in religious harmony and Bengali nationalism, expressed in his Liberation War poster that read: "Hindus of Bengal, Muslims of Bengal, Buddhists of Bengal, Christians of Bengal, we are all Bangali."

He married Saleha, with whom he had two sons, Gautom and Rousseau. She died of cancer in the late 1970s while Chakraborty was on a scholarship in Poland.

He died on 4 February 2008 in Dhaka.

== Awards ==
- Ekushey Padak (1990)
