= Hashem Khan (artist) =

Bangladeshi painter (born 1941)

- হাশেম খান
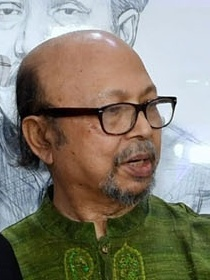
- Khan in 2020
- Born: April 16, 1941 (age 85); Chandpur, Bengal Presidency, British India
- Education: University of Dhaka
- Awards: Ekushey Padak; Independence Day Award

Hashem Khan (born April 16, 1941) is a Bangladeshi painter. His paintings mostly focus rural life of Bangladesh. He has important contribution to enrich Bangladeshi art and culture. Hashem Khan participated in Bangladesh Liberation War and his many artworks on the war. He was also the Chairman of Bangladesh National Museum.

== Career ==
Khan was born in Chandpur district of present-day Bangladesh. He graduated from Faculty of Fine Arts, University of Dhaka in 1961. He was a professor at the Faculty of Fine Arts for 44 years. He retired in 2007. As he was born and grew up in a village his works reflect the natural beauty of the village, rural life, and many other things. His drawing style is different. He has made significant contribution to the book covers and illustrations.

== Exhibitions ==
- Illustration Show, Tokyo, Japan, 1989
- Bangladesh Shilpakala Academy, Dhaka, 1992
- Bangladesh National Museum, Dhaka, 2000
- Shilpangon Gallery, Dhaka, 2002
- Bengal Gallery of Fine Arts, Dhaka, 2005
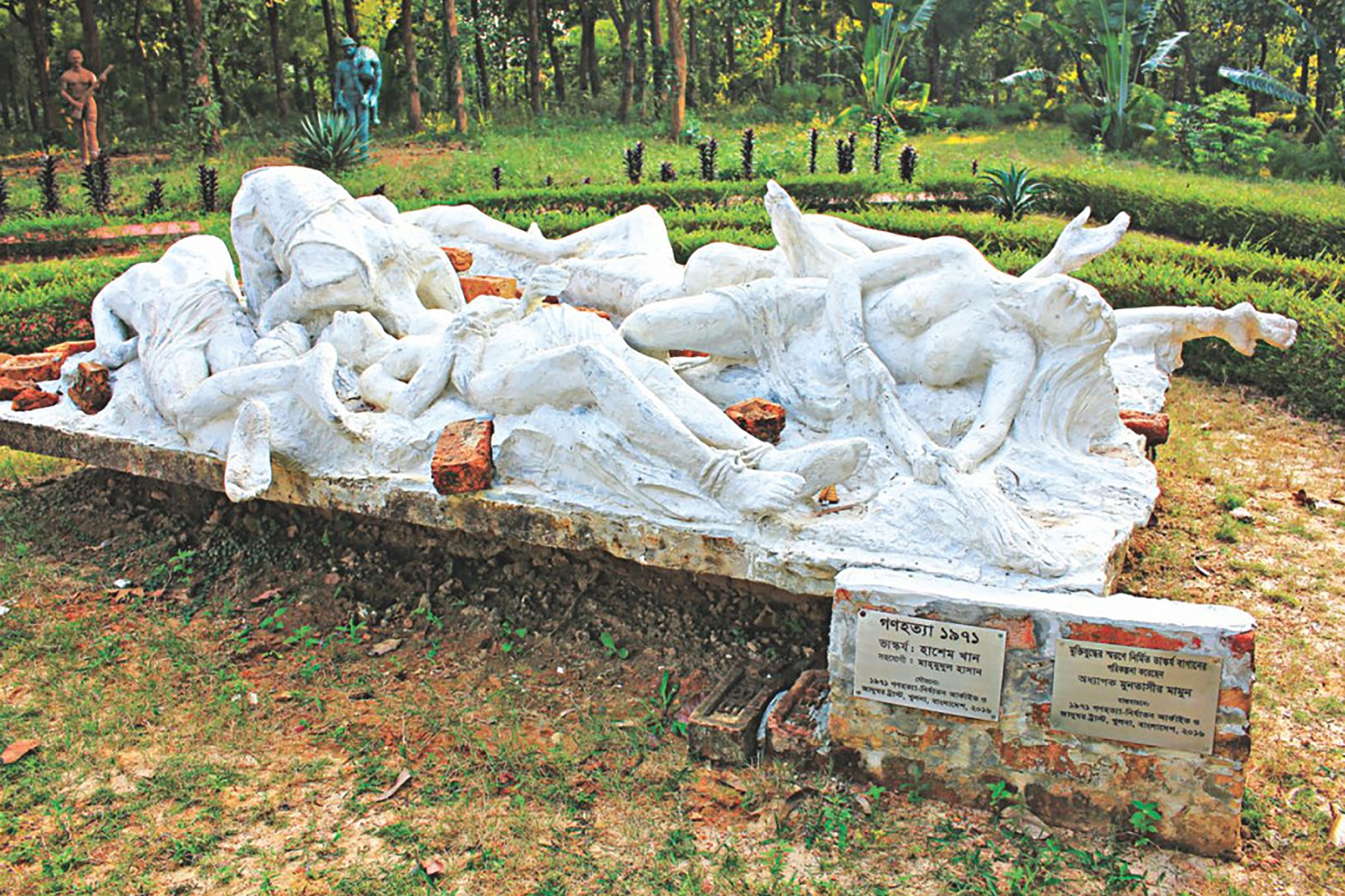
  Gonohotta 1971 in Bharat-Bangladesh Maitri Udyan

== Awards ==
- Ekushey Padak (1992)
- Independence Day Award (2011)

== Recent works ==
- Bharat-Bangladesh Maitri Udyan (India-Bangladesh Friendship Park) 2010
