= Khoda Box =

Bangladeshi Baul singer and composer (1928-1990)

Khoda Box Sain
- Born: 1928; Jahapur village, Alamdanga Upazila, Chuadanga District, Bengal Presidency, British India
- Died: January 15, 1990 (aged 61–62)
- Occupation: Baul musician

Khoda Box (1928 – January 15, 1990) was a Bangladeshi Baul singer and composer. He was awarded Ekushey Padak by the Government of Bangladesh in 1990 for his contribution to Baul music.

== Career ==
Box began singing at the age of ten. He was a regular singer of Bangladesh Betar and Bangladesh Television. He spent most of his life at Lalon's shrine. He took part in establishing Lalon's shrine at Cheuriya in Kushtia.

Box composed around 900 Baul songs.

== Personal life and legacy ==
Box was married to Rahela Khatun. They had a son Baul Abdul Latif Shah. In 1997, Khondokar Riazul Huq edited a book Moromi Kobi Khoda Box Shah consisting of 148 songs by Box.

== Awards ==
- Ekushey Padak (1990)
- Bangla Academy Fellow (1985)
