= Rahija Khanam Jhunu =

Bangladeshi dancer

- Born: 21 June 1943; Manikganj, Bengal Presidency, British India
- Died: 26 November 2017 (aged 74); Dhaka, Bangladesh
- Occupation: Dancer

Rahija Khanam Jhunu (21 June 1943 – 26 November 2017) was a Bangladeshi dancer. She was awarded the Ekushey Padak in 1990 by the government of Bangladesh.

== Education and career ==
Jhunu got admitted at the Bulbul Academy of Fine Arts (BAFA) in 1956. She performed in dance-drama "Chirokaler Bondhutto" at a program in honor of the then Chinese Premier Zhou Enlai who was visiting. She joined BAFA as an instructor in 1960 and became its principal in 1998.

Jhunu's notable students include Lubna Marium, Zinat Barkatullah, Shamim Ara Nipa, Sohel Rahman, Shaju Ahmed and Sadia Islam Mou.

== Works ==
Dance drama

- Nakshi Kanthar Math
- Chirokaler Bondhutto
- Surjomukhi Nodi
- Uttoroner Deshe
- Hajar Tarer Beena
- The Malady

Books

- Nrityoshilpo
- Nrityer Ruprekha
