= List of Independence Award recipients (1990–1999) =

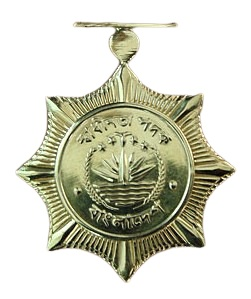
List of Independence Day Award recipients
- 1977–1979
- 1980–1989
- 1990–1999
- 2000–2009
- 2010–2019
- 2020–2029

Independence Award, Bangladesh's highest civilian honours - Winners, 1990-1999:

== 1990 ==
Two individuals were awarded.

Recipients	Area	Note
Aminul Islam	science and technology	
Muhamad Yasin	rural development	

== 1991 ==
Three individuals were awarded.

Recipients	Area	Note
Naeb Subedar Shah Alam	Sports	
Shamsur Rahman	Literature	
M Innas Ali	Science and technology	

== 1992 ==
Two individuals and one organization were awarded.

Recipients	Area	Note
Bangladesh Rice Research Institute	science and technology	organization
Kazi Zaker Husain	education	
Zahir Raihan	literature	posthumous

== 1993 ==
Five individuals were awarded.

Recipients	Area	Note
Qazi Abdul Alim	Sports	
Abul Kashem	Education	Posthumous
SM Sultan	Fine arts	
Jahanara Begum	Rural development	
A. Q. M. Badruddoza Chowdhury	Medical science	

== 1994 ==
Four individuals and one organization were awarded.

Recipients	Area	Note
Directorate of the Geological Survey of Bangladesh	science and technology)	organization
Ahsan Habib	literature	posthumous
Ateequr Rahman	sports	
Mobarak Hossain Khan	music	
Grameen Bank	rural development	organization

== 1995 ==
Seven individuals were awarded.

Recipients	Area	Note
Abdullah-Al-Muti	science and technology	
Alhaz Moulavi Kazi Ambar Ali	education	
Abdul Karim Sahitya Bisharad	literature	posthumous
Begum Ferdausi Rahman	music	
Begum Syed Iqbal Mand Banu	social service	
Zakaria Pintoo	sports	
Syed Mohammad Ali	journalism	

== 1996 ==
Eight individuals were awarded.

Recipients	Area	Note
Moulavi Abdul Hashim	literature	
Anjuman Mufidul Islam	social work	organization
Mohammad Abdul Jabbar	music	
Sabina Yasmin	music	
Professor A. M. Zahurul Haq	science and technology	
Dr. Kazi Abul Monsur	medical science	
Kazi Salahuddin	sports	
Safiuddin Ahmed	fine arts	

== 1997 ==
Ten individuals were awarded.

Recipients	Area	Note
Munshi Siddique Ahmed	science and technology	
Nurul Islam	medical science	
Kabir Chowdhury	education	
Abdul Matin	education	
Sufia Kamal	literature	
Shawkat Osman	literature	
Abdul Alim	music	posthumous
Jahanara Imam	social work	
Syed Mohammad Hossein	social work	
Dhirendranath Datta	language and independence movements	posthumous

== 1998 ==
Recipients	Area	Note
Shahidullah Kaiser	literature	posthumous
Abdul Mosabber Chowdhury	science and technology	
Sheikh Fazilatunnesa Mujib	liberation war	posthumous
Syed Nazrul Islam	liberation war	posthumous
Tajuddin Ahmed	liberation war	posthumous
Captain Mansur Ali	liberation war	posthumous
A. H. M. Kamruzzaman	liberation war	posthumous
Abdur Rab Serniabat	liberation war	posthumous
Sheikh Fazlul Huq Moni	liberation War	posthumous
Sheikh Kamal	sports	posthumous

== 1999 ==
Recipients	Area	Note
Mazharul Islam	architecture	
Fazlur Rahman Khan	architecture	posthumous
Mohammad Kibria	fine arts	
Sikandar Abu Zafar	literature	posthumous
Brojen Das	sports	posthumous
Begum Badrunnesa Ahmed	social work	
Kalim Sharafi	music	
A. Q. M. Bazlul Karim	education	
A.F.Salahuddin Ahmed	education	
Abdus Samad Azad	liberation war	
Rashiduddin Ahmad	medical science	
A. M. Harun-ar-Rashid		
