= Bangladesh Folk Arts and Crafts Foundation =

- বাংলাদেশ লোক ও কারুশিল্প ফাউন্ডেশন
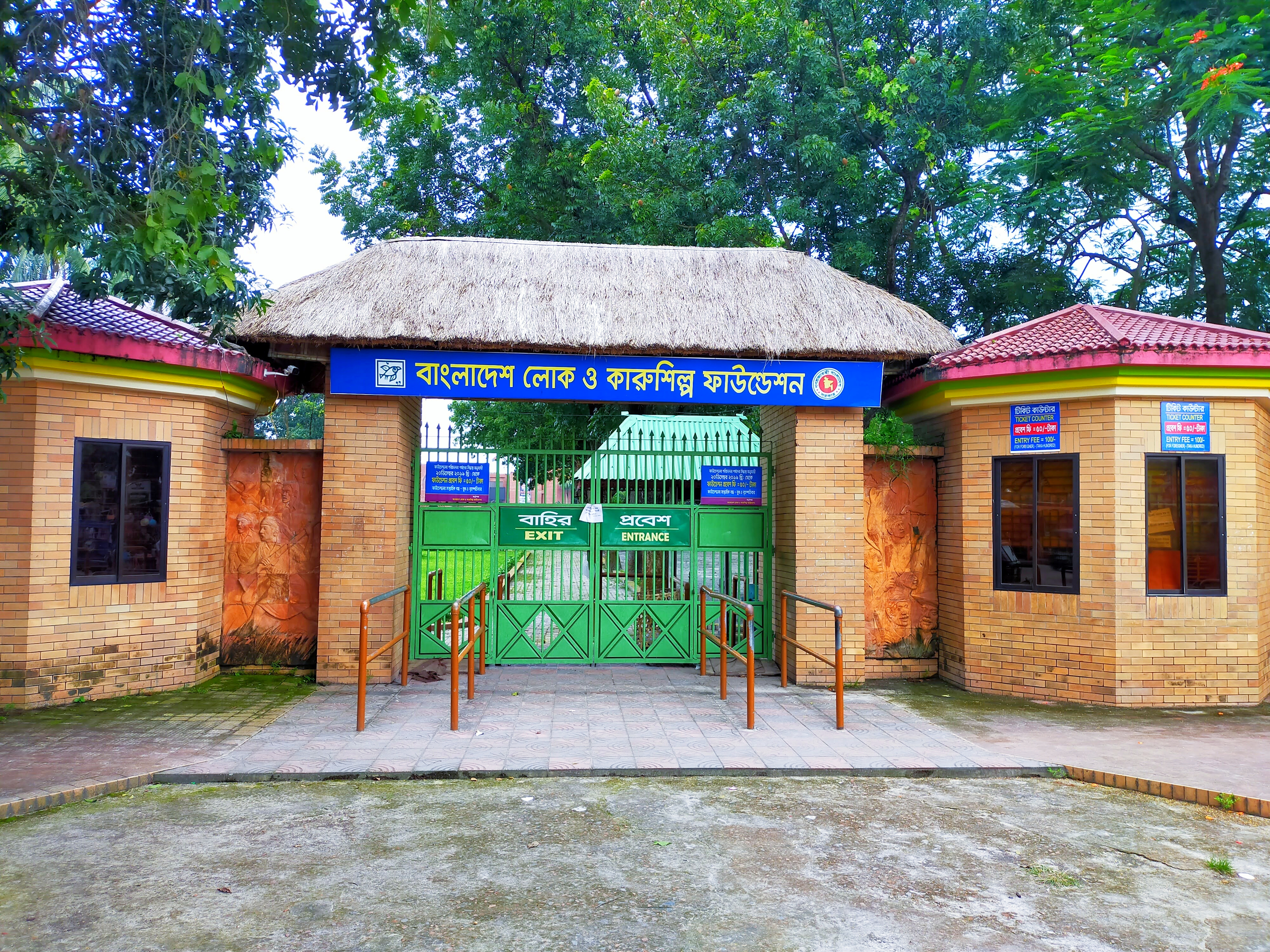
- Bangladesh Folk Arts and Crafts Foundation Main gate, Sonargaon, Narayanganj
- Formation: 1975
- Headquarters: Sonargaon, Narayanganj, Bangladesh
- Region served: Bangladesh
- Official language: Bengali
- Website: Bangladesh Folk Arts and Crafts Foundation

Bangladesh Folk Arts and Crafts Foundation is a government foundation that is responsible for the preservation of; and arrange training programmes on arts and crafts, and the setting up of folk art museum in Bangladesh and is located in Sonargaon, Narayanganj, Bangladesh.

== History ==
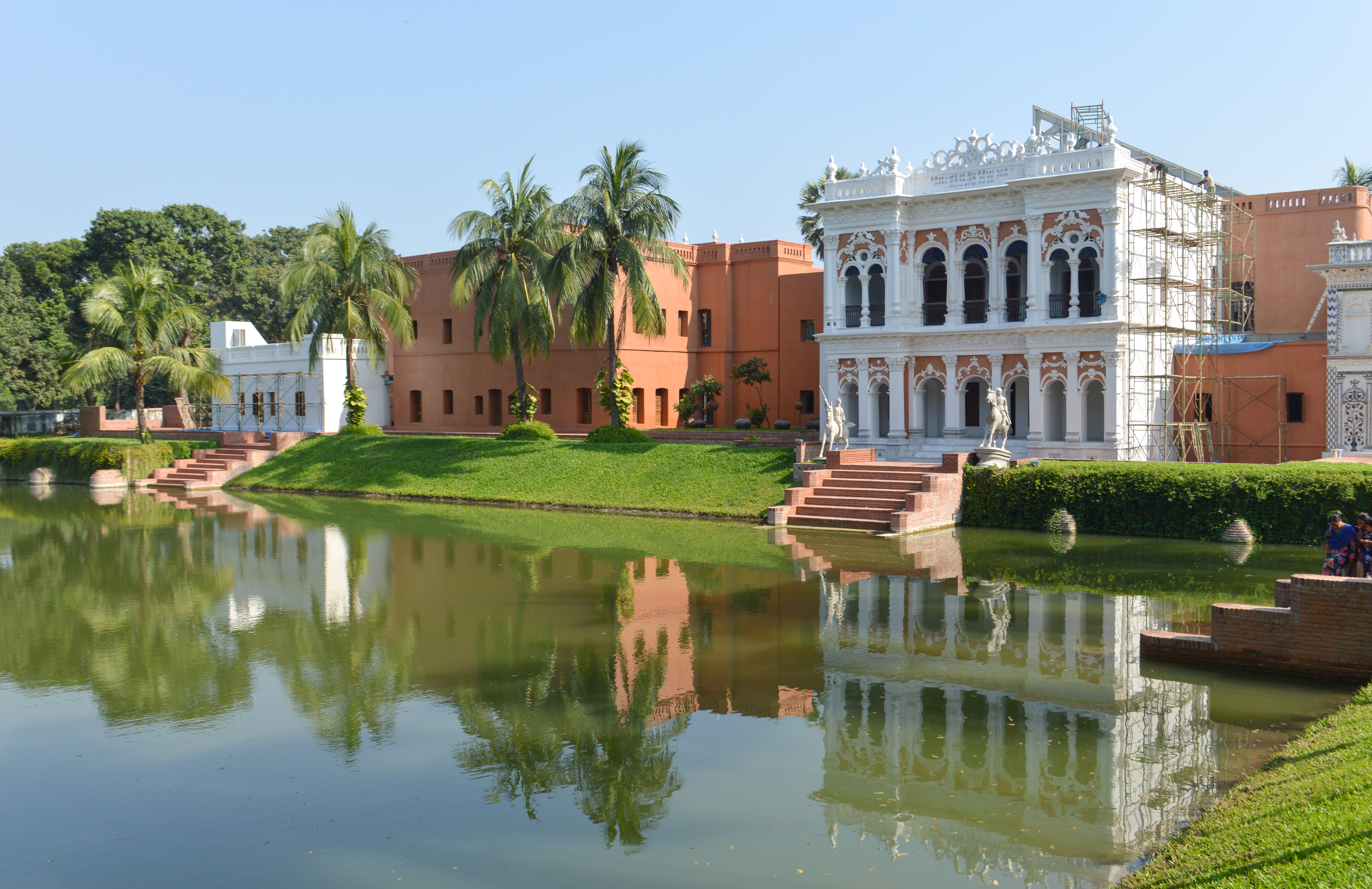
Folk Art and Craft Museum, Sonargaon

The foundation was established in July 1975. It was amended through the Bangladesh Folk Art and Crafts Foundation Act in parliament. The minister of cultural affairs. It holds a yearly month long fair celebrating folk art. It also holds fair every Bengali New Year.It is important for every country, especially Bangladesh for its rich culture and heritage to have a foundation like this to protect endangered historical sites like Sonargaon and Panam Nagar (Panam city)
