= Kashefa Hussain =

Bangladeshi judge (born 1958)

The Honourable Kashefa Hussain
- কাশেফা হুসাইন

Justice of the High Court Division of Bangladesh
- In office 5 August 2013 – 10 August 2024

Personal details
- Born: 1 July 1958 (age 68)
- Parent: Syed Mohammad Hossein
- Education: University of Dhaka; University of London
- Profession: Judge

Kashefa Hussain (born 1 July 1958) is a retired judge of the Appellate Division of Bangladesh Supreme Court.

== Early life and education ==
Hussain was born on 1 July 1958. Her father, Syed Muhammad Hussain was also a justice. Her mother's name is Suraiya Hussain. She passed her B.A and M.A in English literature from University of Dhaka. She has completed her second masters in law from University of London.

== Career ==
Hussain was elevated as additional judge of the High Court Division on 5 August 2013. She resigned from her post in the face of students agitation.
