= Shilpacharya Zainul Folk and Craft Museum =

Folk and Craft Museum

- শিল্পাচার্য জয়নুল লোক ও কারুশিল্প জাদুঘর
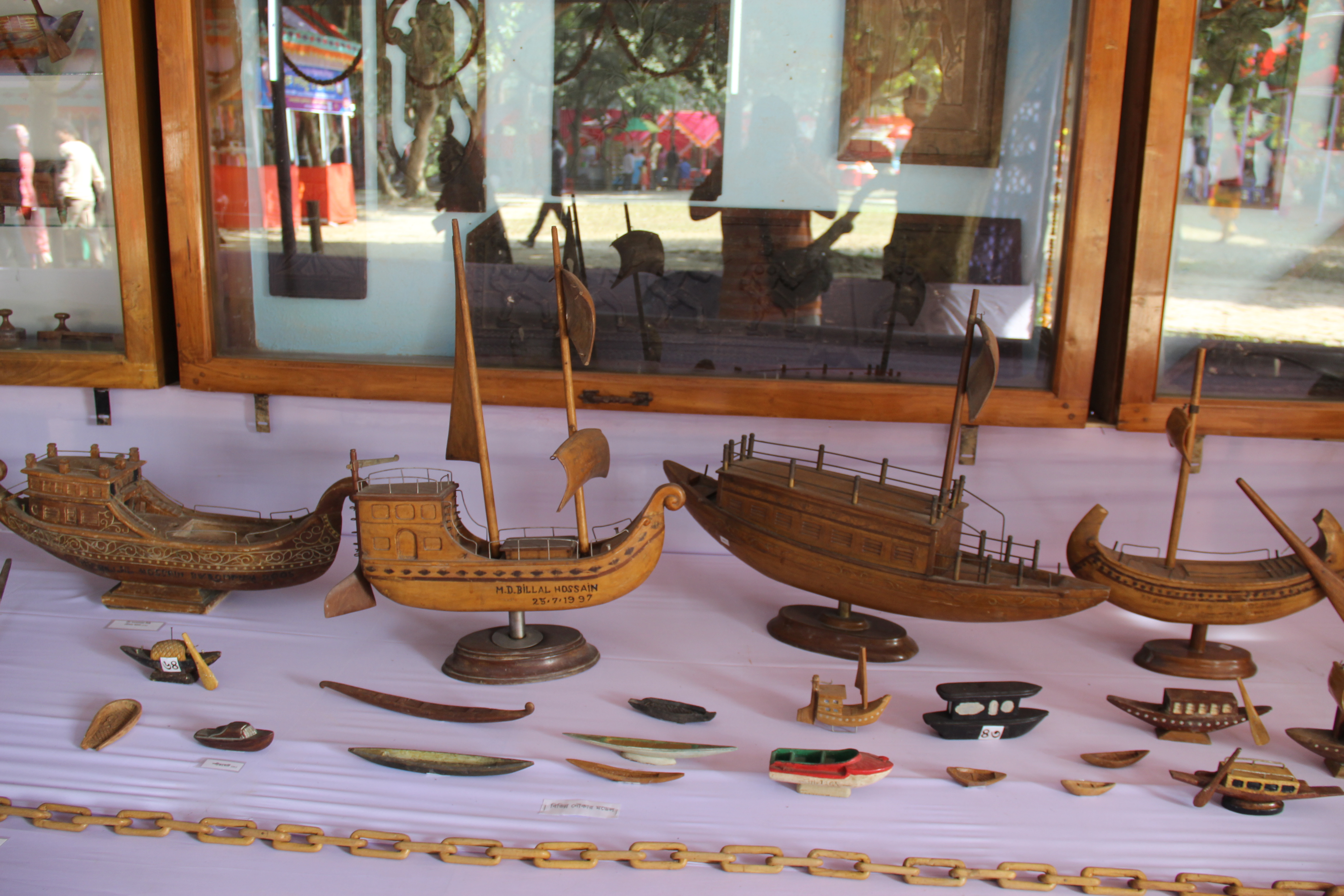
- Location: Sonargaon, Narayanganj, Bangladesh
- Coordinates: 23.6487°N 90.60158°E
- Type: Folk and crafts
- Founder: Zainul Abedin

Shilpacharya Zainul Folk and Craft Museum, a museum established by Zainul Abedin and the Bangladesh Folk Arts and Crafts Foundation to preserve the ancient heritage of Bangladesh, is located in Sonargaon, near Dhaka.

== History ==
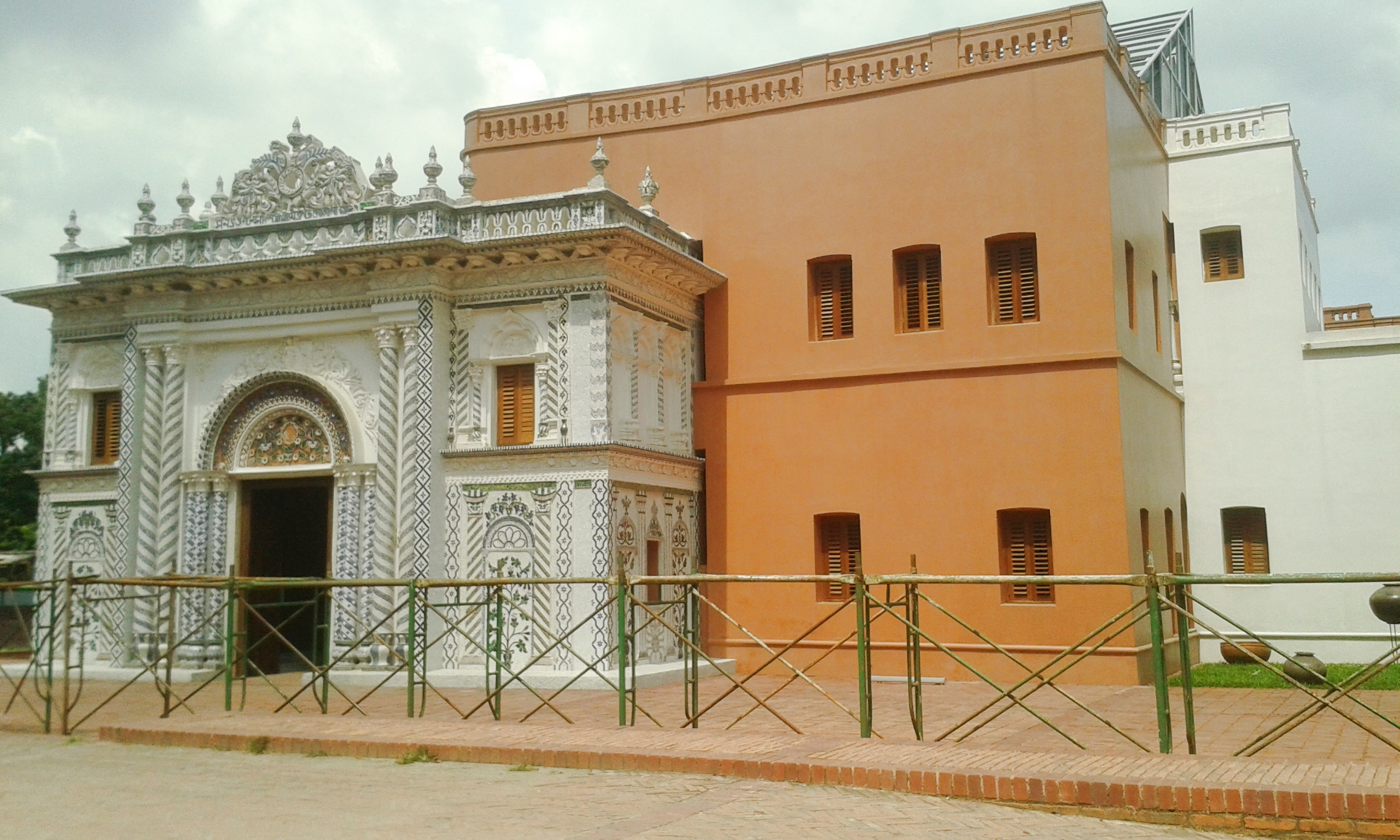
The old building of Sonargaon Museum

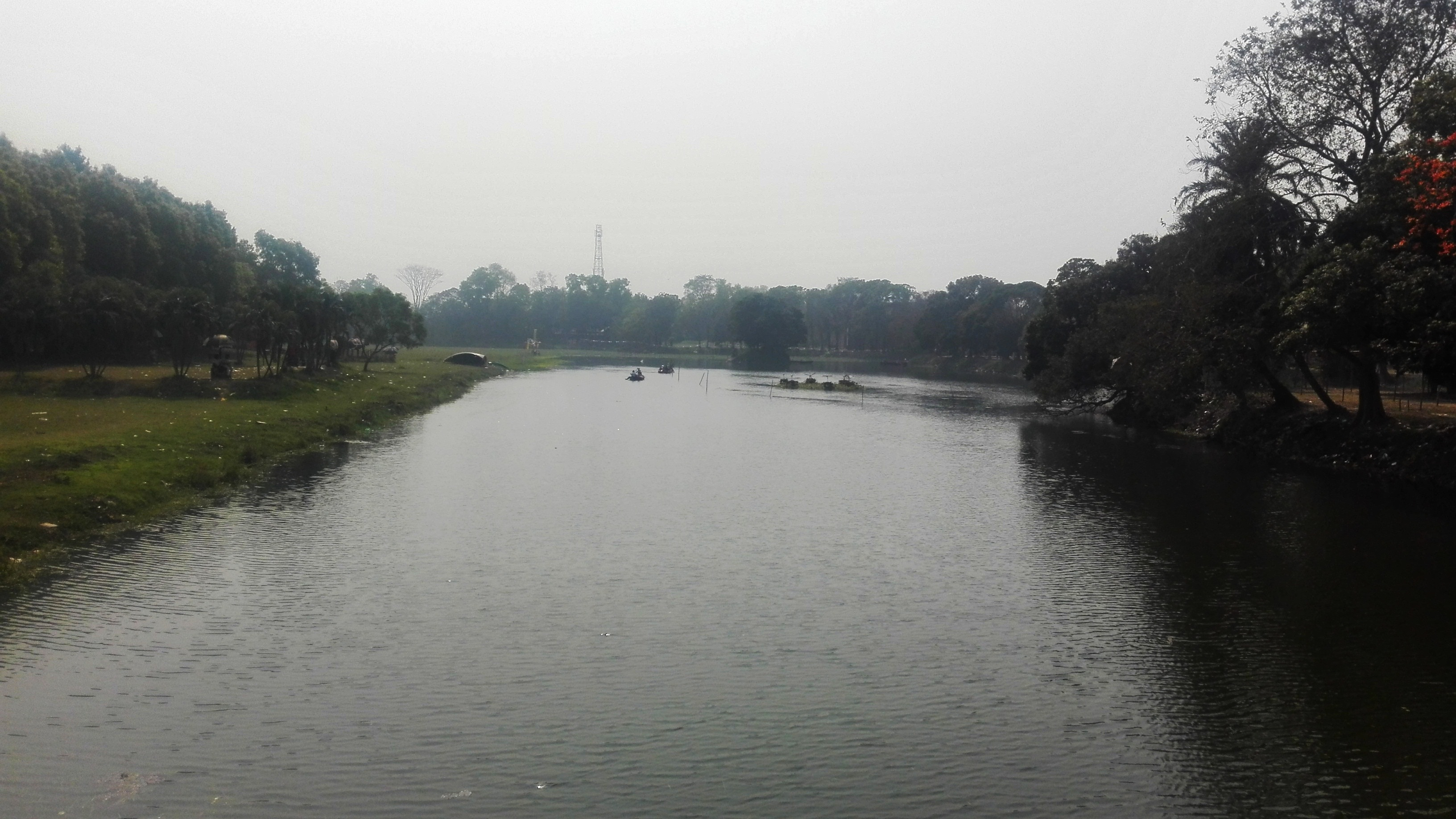
The reservoir in the middle of the museum park

In an effort to develop the folk cultural trend of rural Bengal, Shilpacharya Zainul Abedin established the Bangladesh Folk and Crafts Foundation on 12 March 1975, in an old house in the historic Panam city of Sonargaon. Later, in 1981, in a complex covering an area of 150 bighas, artist Zainul Abedin attempted to build this museum in an open environment to showcase the artistic activities of the common people of rural Bangladesh, centered on the nature and environment of Bengal, and the Bangladesh Folk and Crafts Foundation complex was shifted to the almost 100-year-old Sardar's house.

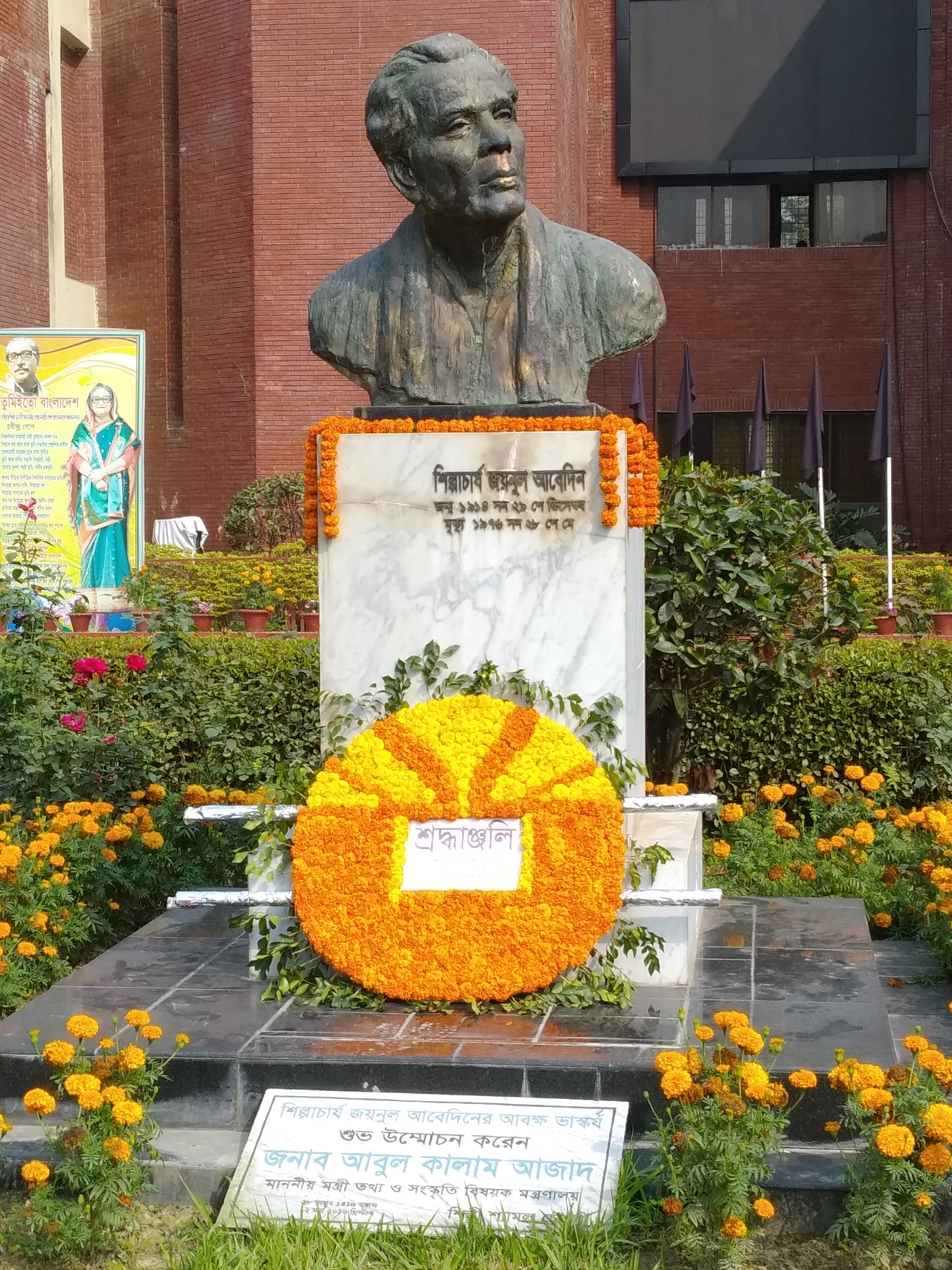
Sculpture of Zainul Abedin in the premises of the Museum

== Overview ==
The Folk and Crafts Museum is located in the Bangladesh Folk Arts and Crafts Foundation area in Sonargaon. It houses the handicrafts of the illiterate artists of neglected rural Bengal and everyday products of public life. These artefacts reveal the traditional folk art of ancient Bengal at that time.

There are a total of 10 galleries in Sardar's house. The galleries display wood carvings, crafts, paintings and masks, tribal life-based artifacts, rural folk life environment, folk musical instruments and terracotta artifacts, copper-cast-brass artifacts, iron-made artifacts, folk ornaments, and many more. A little east of the building is the Zainul Abedin Memorial Museum, established in a modern building rich in folk architecture. There are only two galleries in this building. One of these two galleries is made of wood, which is rich in ancient and modern artifacts. Moreover, the natural, characteristic wood of Bangladesh and the overall process of making various crafts from wood and finally selling it, have been very attractively depicted with models. Outside these two buildings, there are libraries, documentation centers, seminar halls, canteens, craft stages, rural gardens and various types of trees, a lake, a boat ramp for cruising around the lake, fishing facilities, and a birdwatching boat.

== Gallery ==
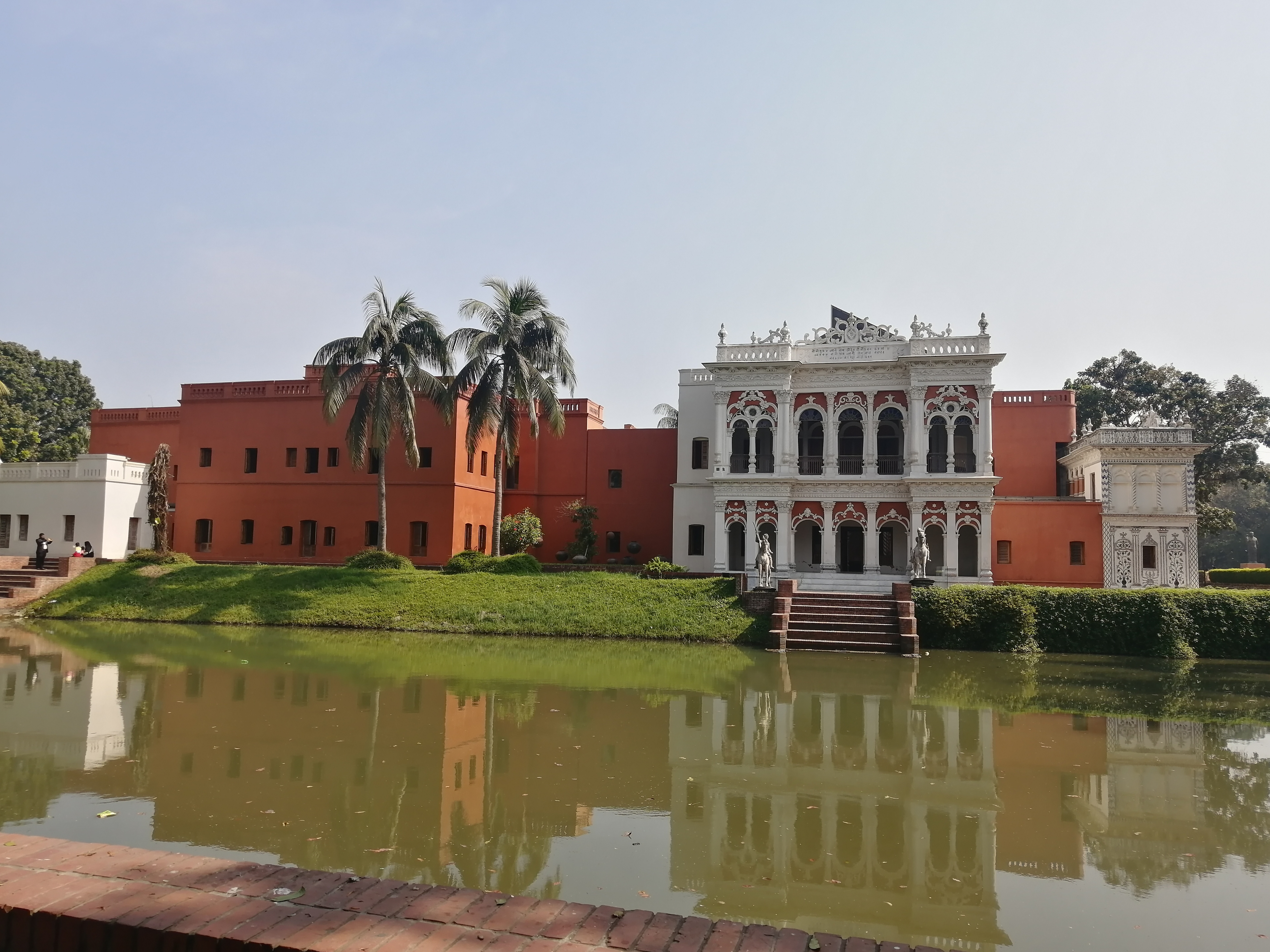
The big Sardar's house which is known as Isa Kha Zamindar's house

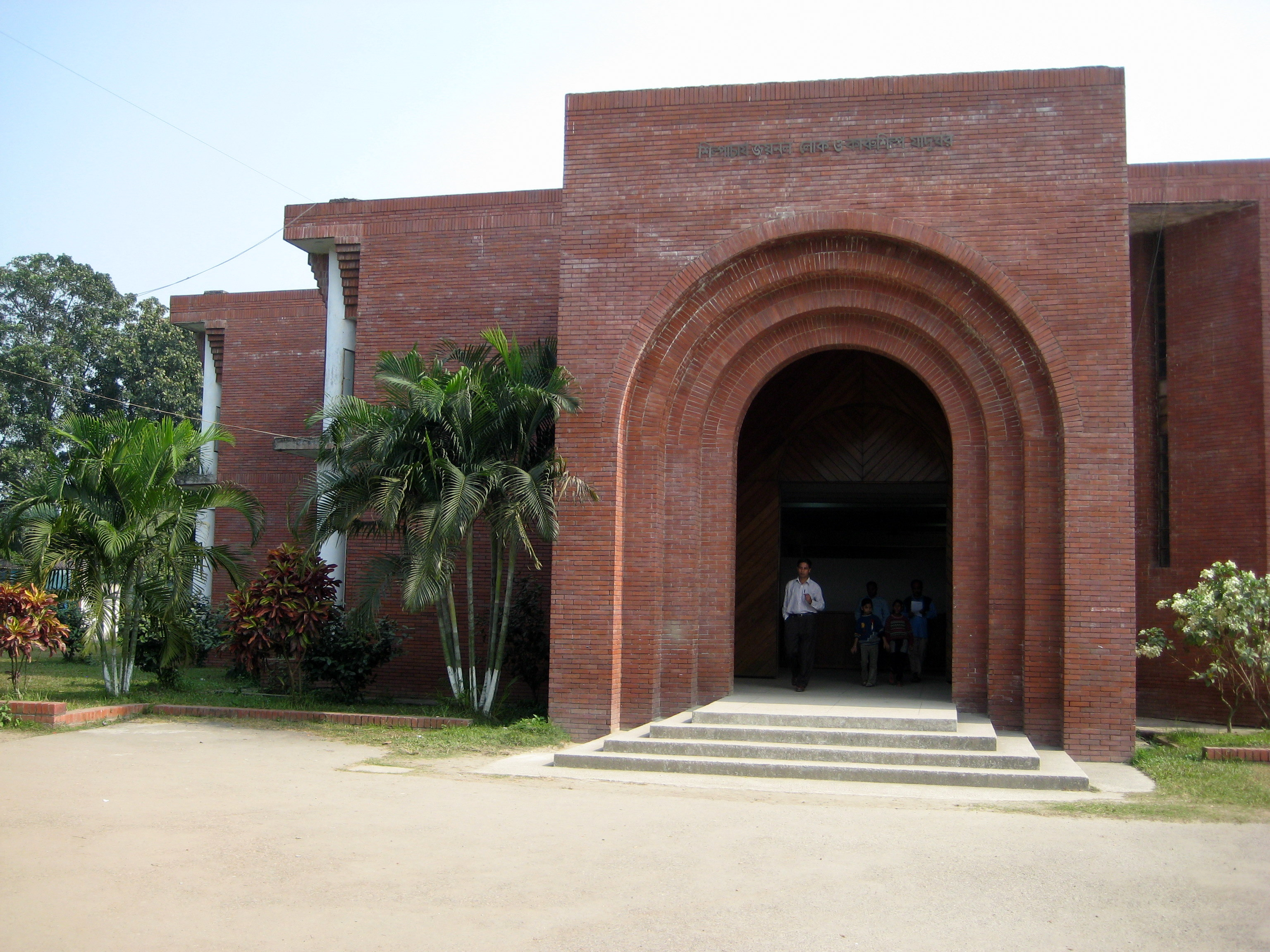
Museum entrance

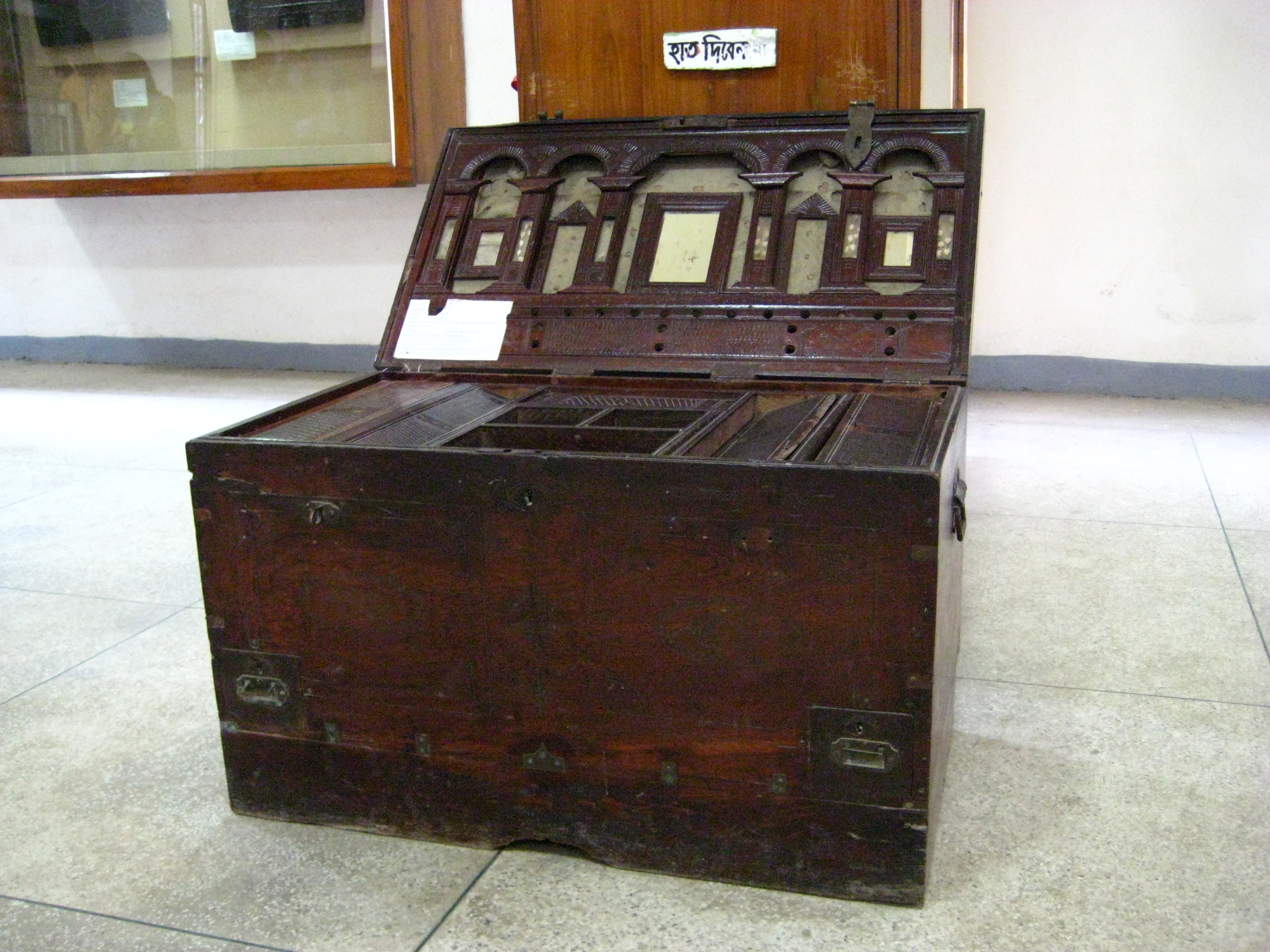
19th century wooden box for storing valuables

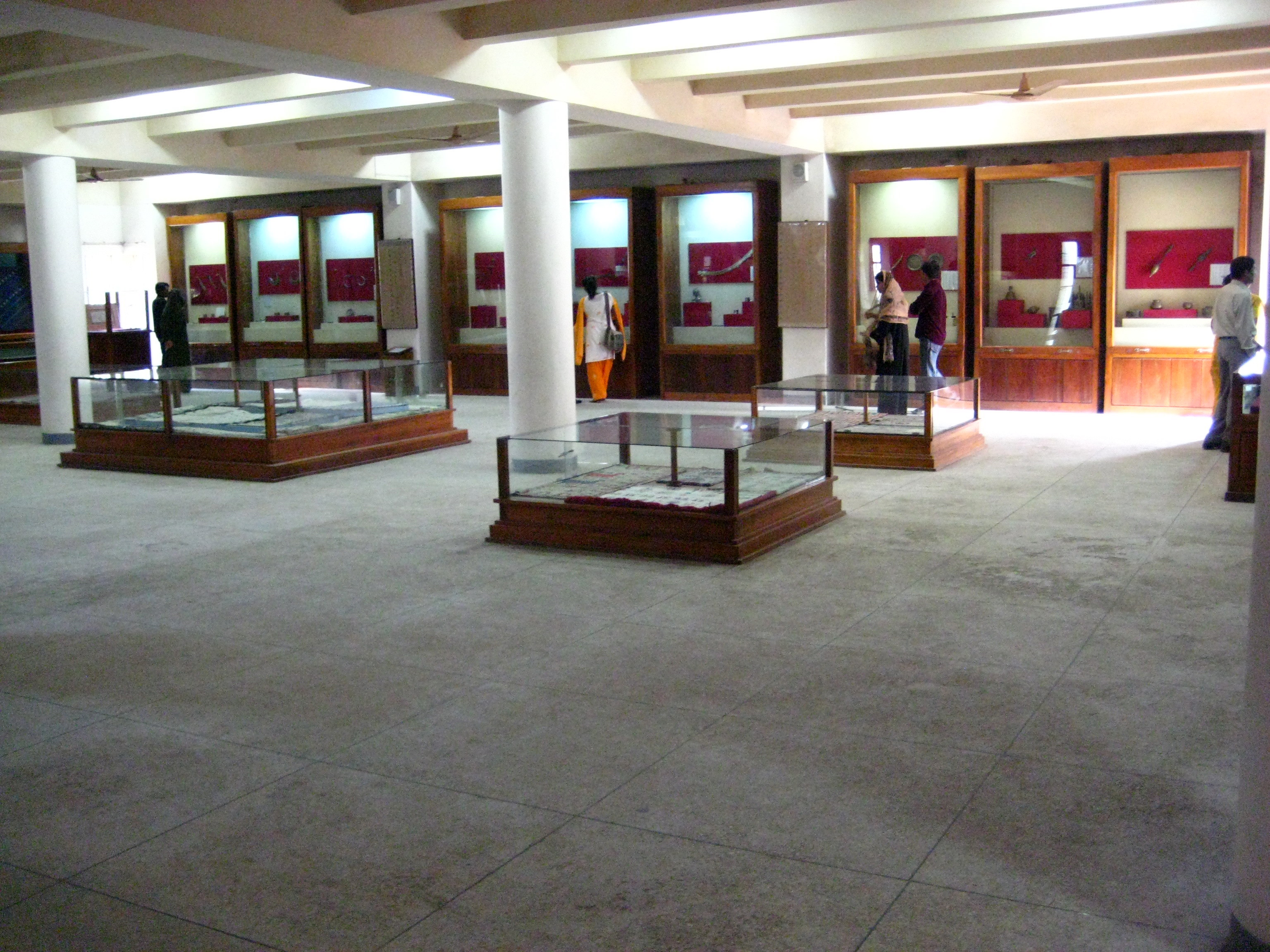
Part of the gallery

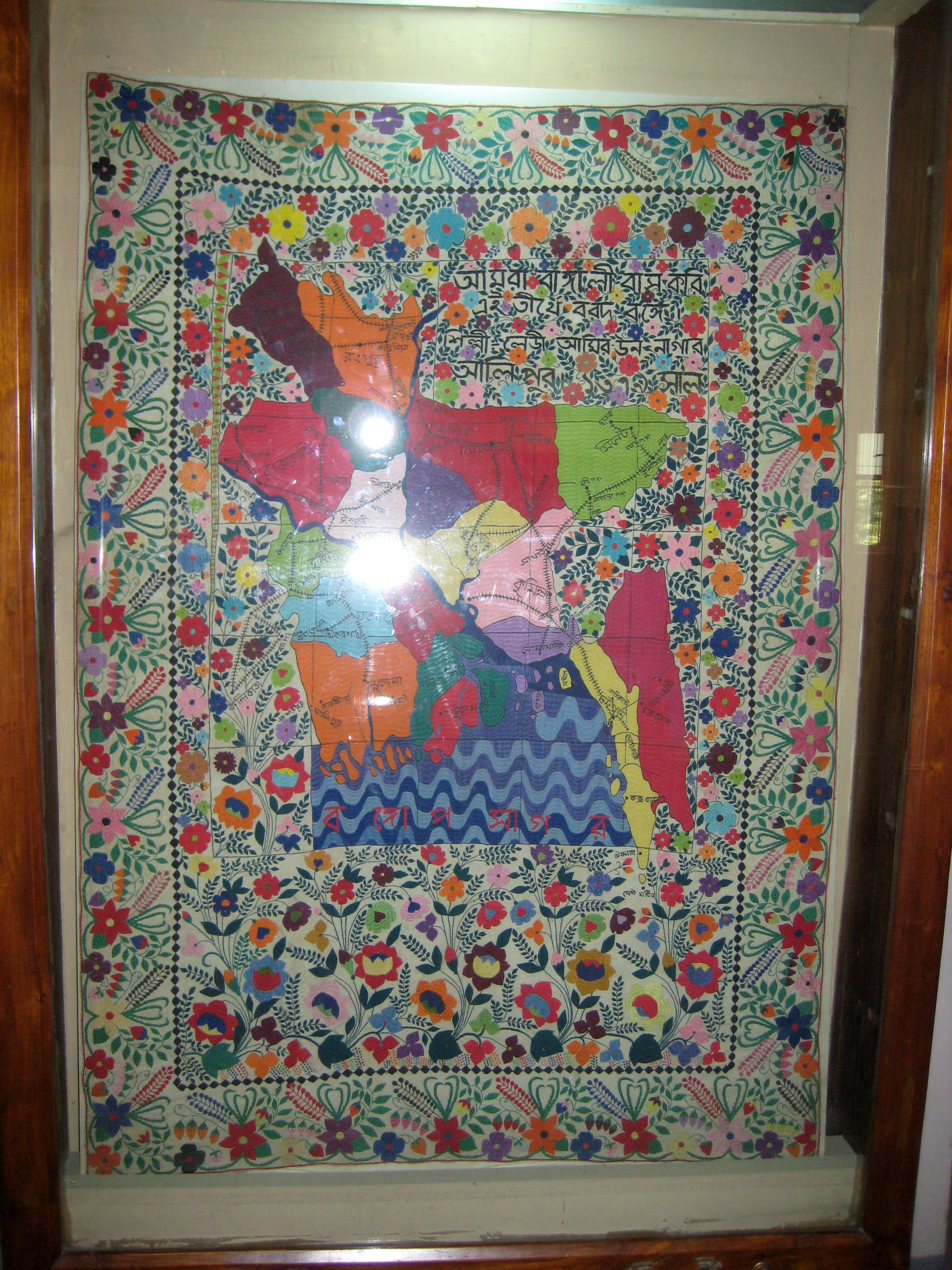
Map of Bangladesh depicted in Nakshi Katha

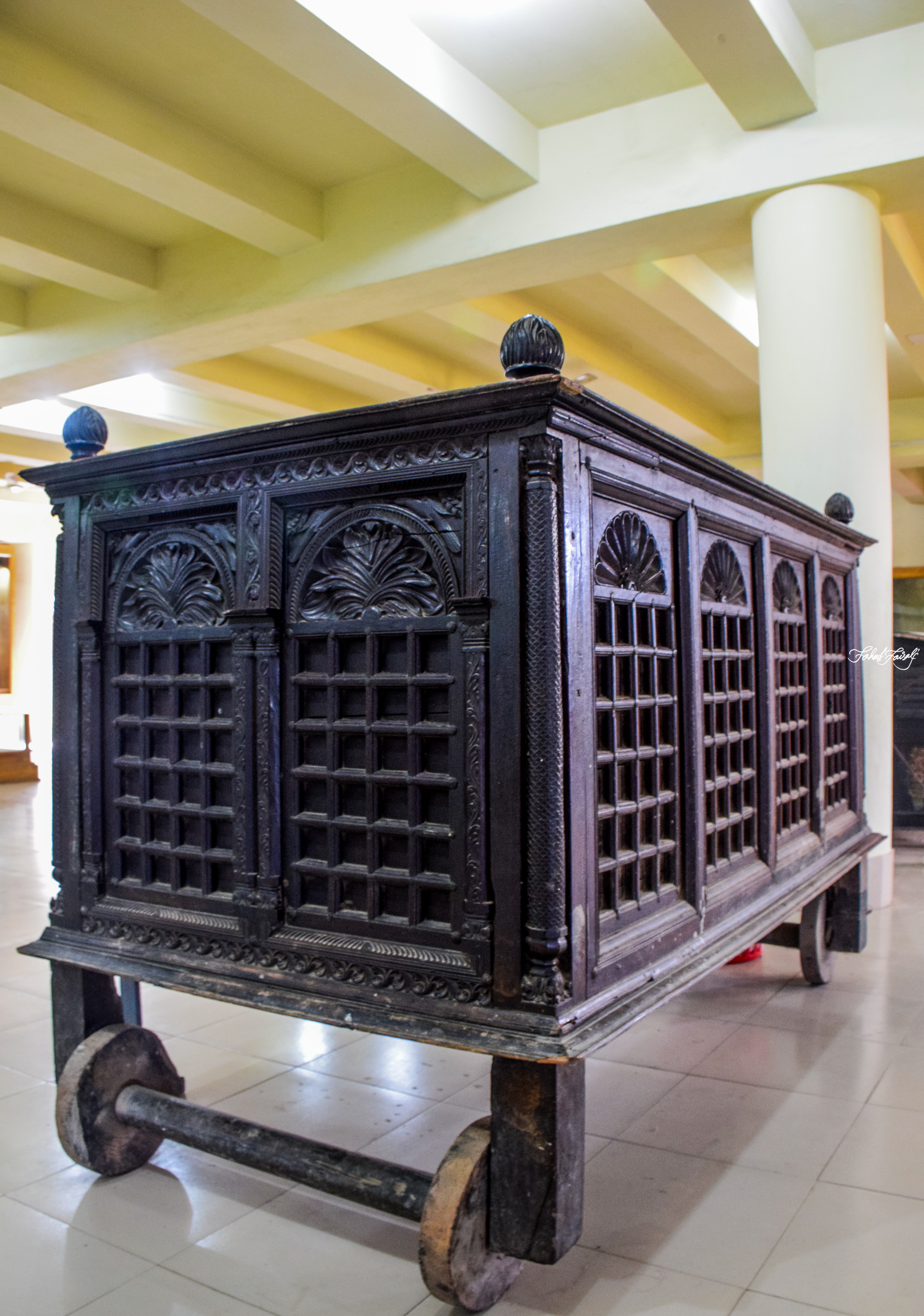
Wooden box

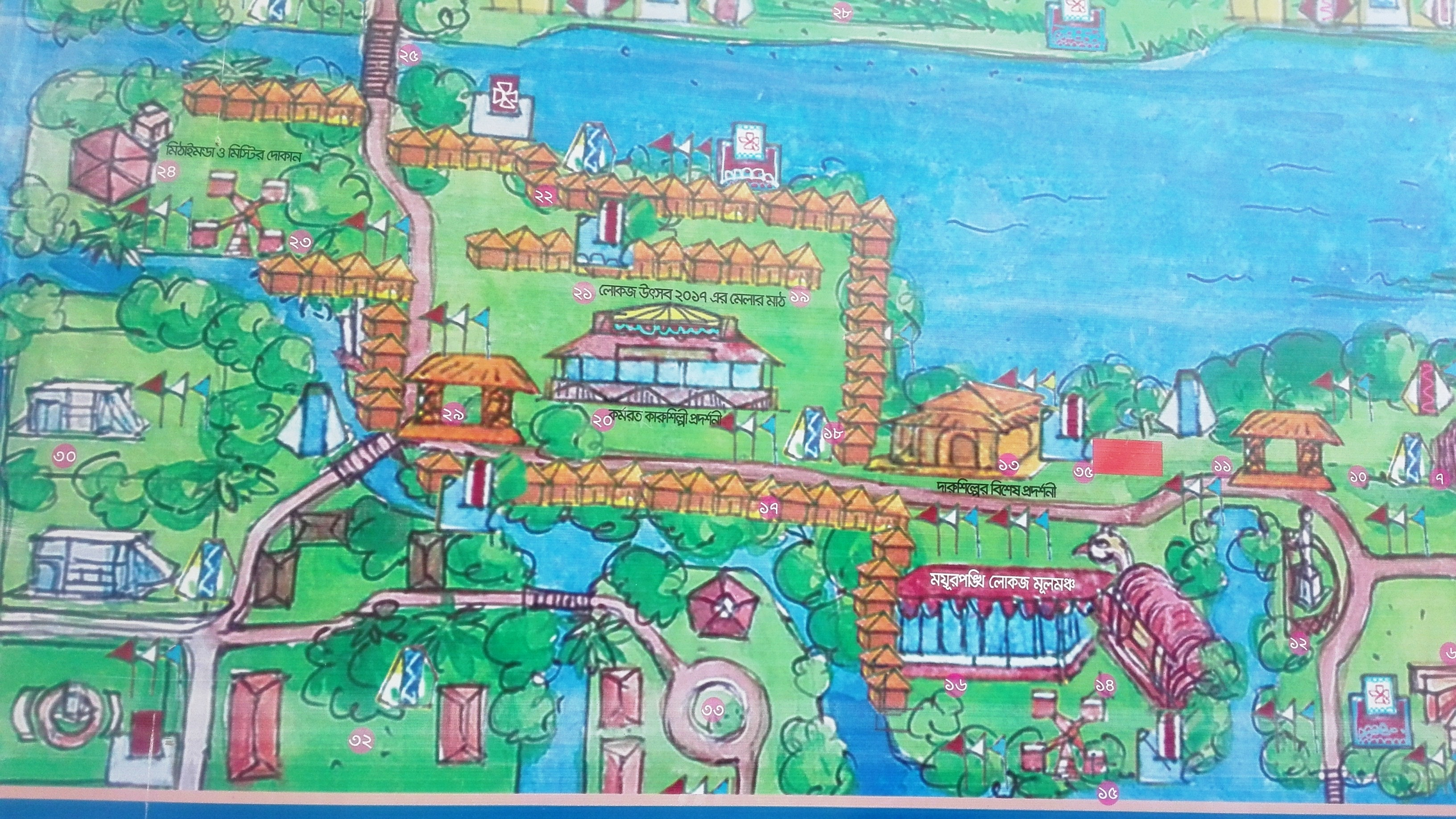
Museum area guide

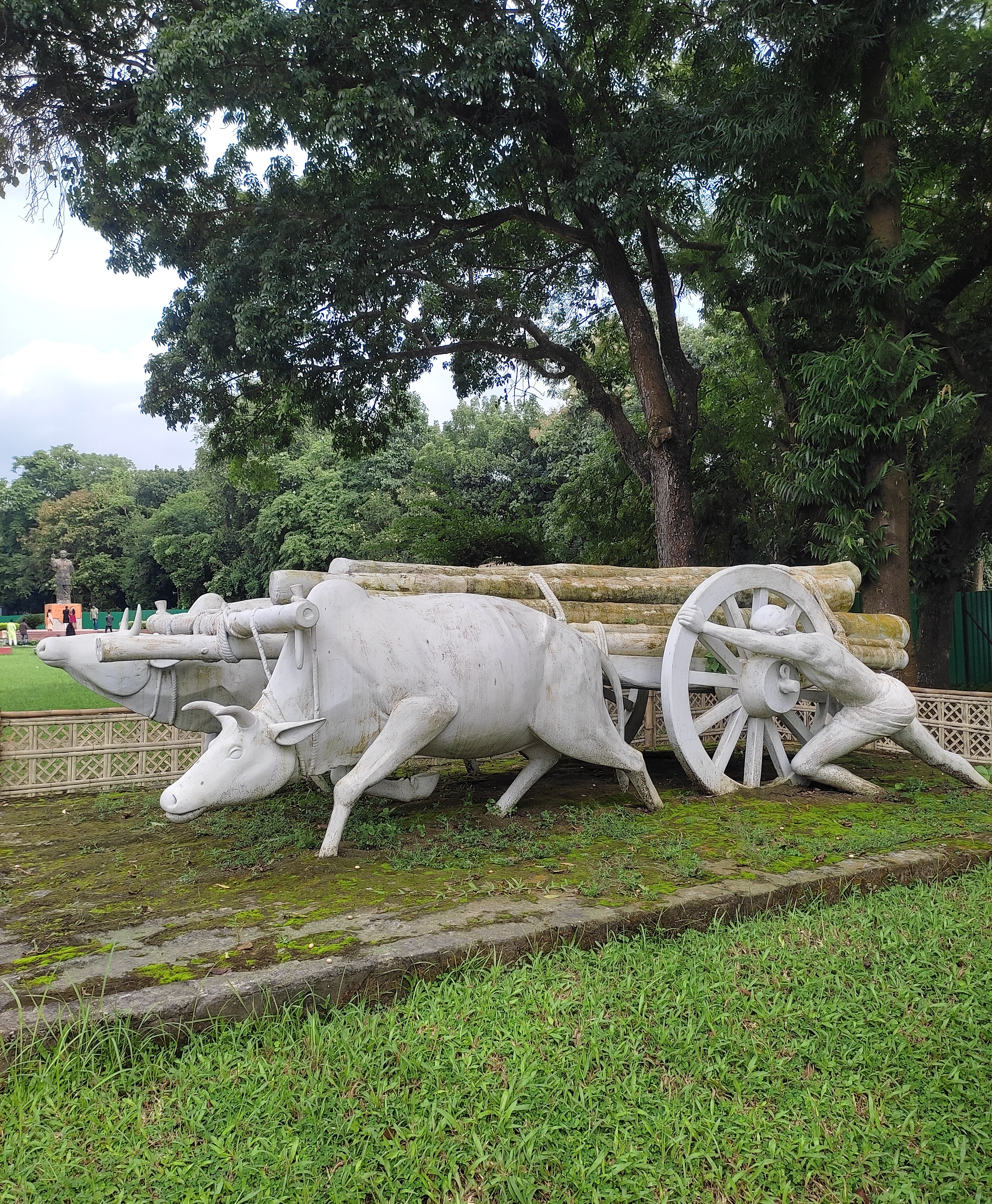
"Sangram" - Sculpture based on the work of Zainul Abedin
