= Safiuddin Ahmed =

Bangladeshi artist (1922–2012)

- Born: 23 June 1922; Calcutta, Bengal Presidency, British India
- Died: 20 May 2012 (aged 89); Dhaka, Bangladesh
- Education: Government School of Art
- Occupation: Artist
- Awards: Independence Day Award (1996); Ekushey Padak (1978)

Safiuddin Ahmed (23 June 1922 – 20 May 2012) was a Bangladeshi artist. He was awarded Ekushey Padak in 1978 and Independence Day Award in 1996 by the Government of Bangladesh.

== Family ==
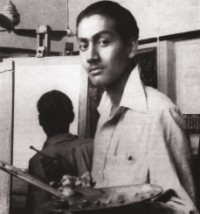
Ahmed in Calcutta Government School of Art in the 1930s

Ahmed was born on 23 June 1922, in Bhabanipur. His father, Matinuddin Ahmed, was a sub-registrar in the land office of the Government of Bengal and his mother, Bibi Jamila Khatun, was a housewife. Three generations of his family had lived in their paternal homestead in Bhabanipur. Ahmad's paternal grandfather, Aminuddin Ahmed, was a popular doctor in Bhabanipur. Aminuddin Ahmed was known as "Bachu Daktar" by the local residents. The road in front of his house was named "Bachu Daktar Lane" after Aminuddin Ahmed's death under the initiative of the "Kolkata municipality". Ahmed's father died when he was young. Bhabanipur was adjacent to shahebpara chaurangi. although people from different provinces lived in this area, majority of the inhabitants were culturally conscious Bengali Hindus and Muslims. Baliganj of south Kolkata was then in the suburbs, populated sparsely.

== Education ==
Ahmed has studied art at Calcutta Government School of Art in 1936. Ahmed came into proximity with many people while studying in the art school from 1930 to 1942 as he practiced painting nature studies and landscapes and went to draw people with the students to the bank of the Ganges, the zoo and the Sealdah station, likewise he want to studio in the home of the teacher prohlad, which always had its door open to visitors, was also frequented by Dilip Dasgupta, Zainul Abedin and others. This means, Ahmed was one of those who spent most of the hours of the day practicing art, through studies outside the school and in prohlad's studio. Other than this, as students they regularly went to the Radha area at the western border of Bengal to Birbhum and the adjacent dumka area of Jharkhand. The everyday life of the santals of that area, the dry landscape, vegetation, slowly flowing rivers, sky, horizons of Radha have repeatedly appeared as subjects of paintings and prints done during his student life. The second world war started in Europe in 1939. In 1958, he completed the diploma courses in printmaking from the Central School of Arts and Crafts in London with distinction.

== Career ==
Ahmed was the pioneer of printmaking in Bangladesh. He, along with Zainul Abedin and others, played an important role in the foundation of the Dhaka Art College (now the Faculty of Fine Arts of Dhaka University.).

He was employed in Prahlad Karmarkar's studio. In one early painting there, he departed from pure narration to add his own perception and variation in the etching. Ramendranath chakravorty as a teacher of printmaking as a creative art form. Inspired by them, Ahmed learned the techniques of printmaking along with painting. Even in the mid-twentieth century, printmaking was not considered a mainstream medium in the subcontinent. Even now in the Government College of Art & Craft in Kolkata at the bachelor's degree level, printmaking is taught as a subject painting. The print making medium was not at that time among the mainstream media like painting and sculpture and one of Ahmed's greatest achievements is that he helped raise this discipline of apparently secondary importance by adopting it as the main medium for his creative works and assisted it to reach a status equal to that of painting and sculpture. While living in Kolkata, the life of indigenous santals, give him inspiration to draw various paintings. But after coming back to East Pakistan the look, posture and the environment of his picture changed. "Empty basket", lemonade stand (pl.8.15) painted in oil colors in 1952 are quite perceptibly pictures of East Pakistan. The two painting : “Fishing" and "carpenter" done between 1954 and 1956 deserve special mention for two reasons. In these two paintings we notice that he has tried to experiment with shapes more than in his landscape which are composed with the combination of light and shade. The color of these two paintings are strongly flat, the edges or contours of the forms subjective exaggeration has been resorted to rather than attempting to remain faithful to pictorially reconstruct the visual world in his own way. As a result, from this period his paintings gradually started to move towards abstraction. In 1958, he completed the diploma course in printmaking from the Central School of Art and Design in London with distinction from 1956 to 1974. He visited different galleries of England, France, Italy, Germany, Belgium, Netherlands, Switzerland, Soviet Union and India.

Ahmed helped raise the profile of a printmaking, a discipline often considered of secondary importance, by adopting it as his main medium. He inspired many other artists from the subcontinent to begin printmaking.

Though Ahmed had been born and brought up in the city, he selected the landscape and life of the people in particularly remote areas of Radha Vangaand Jharkhand as the setting of his works.

In the oil paintings Sunlit Hut, Dumka-1, Dumka-2 and Dumka ShalForest done in 1946, he applied the pigment in strokes like the Impressionists; and did not create sfumato by mixing paints.

== Gallery of works ==
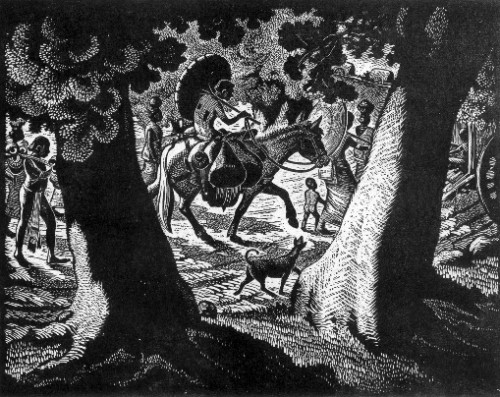
On the way to the fair, 1947

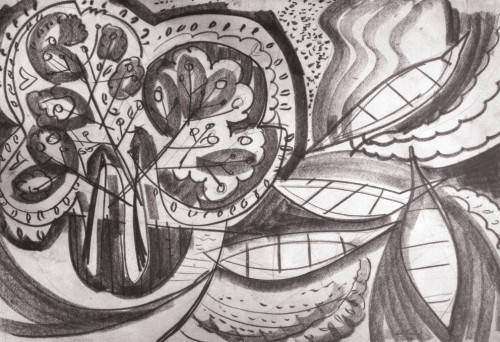
Boat and Tree, 1966

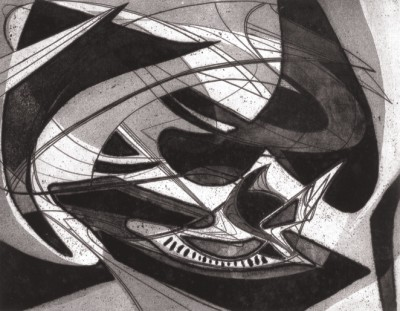
Composition, 1958

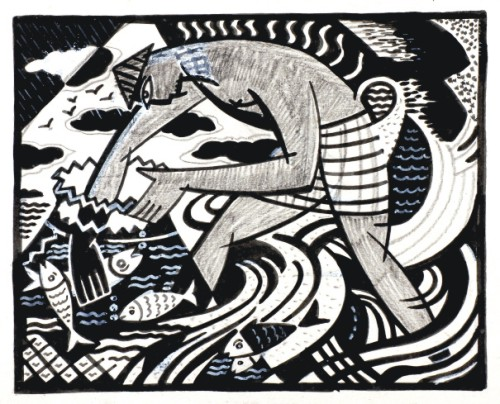
Fishing, 1950

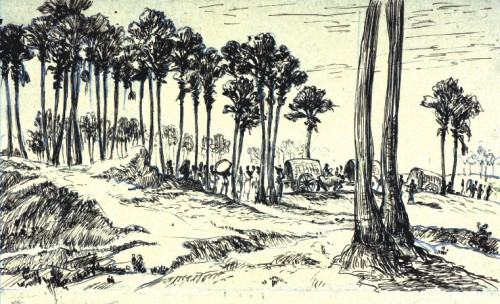
Santiniketan, 1945

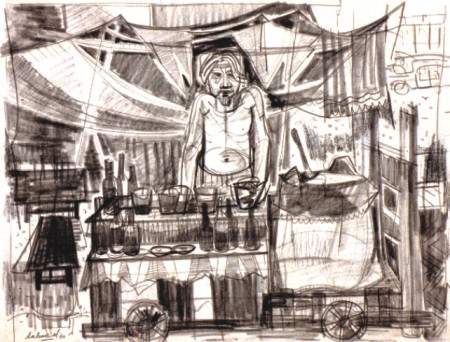
Santiniekta, 1945

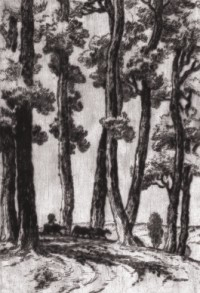
Dumka, 1945

== Death ==
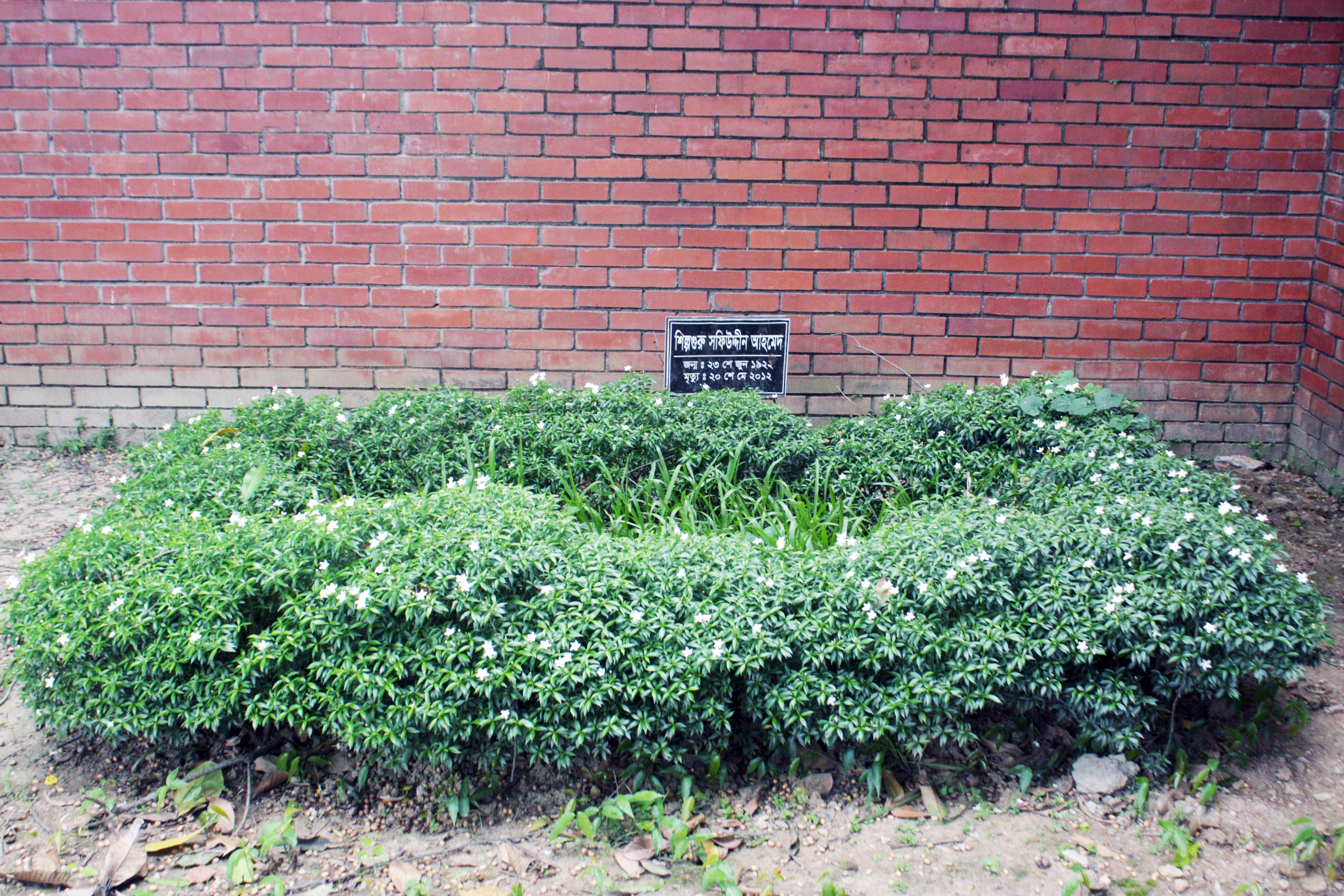
Ahmed buried beside the central mosque of the University of Dhaka

Ahmed died at Square Hospital in Dhaka on 20 May 2012, aged 89.
