= Abedin (crater) =

Crater on Mercury

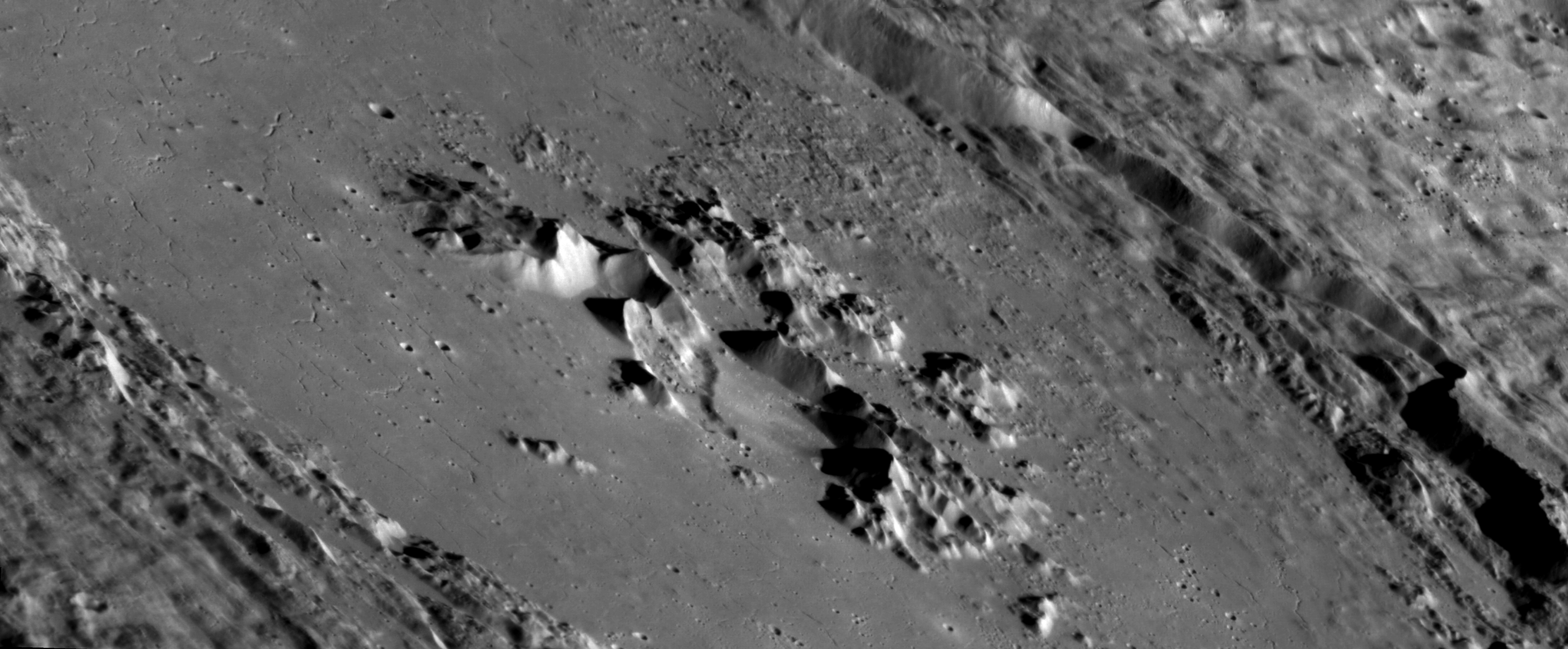
- MESSENGER mosaic of the interior of Abedin
- Feature type: Impact crater
- Location: Victoria quadrangle, Mercury
- Coordinates: 61.73°N 10.66°W
- Diameter: 116.23 km (72.22 mi)
- Eponym: Zainul Abedin

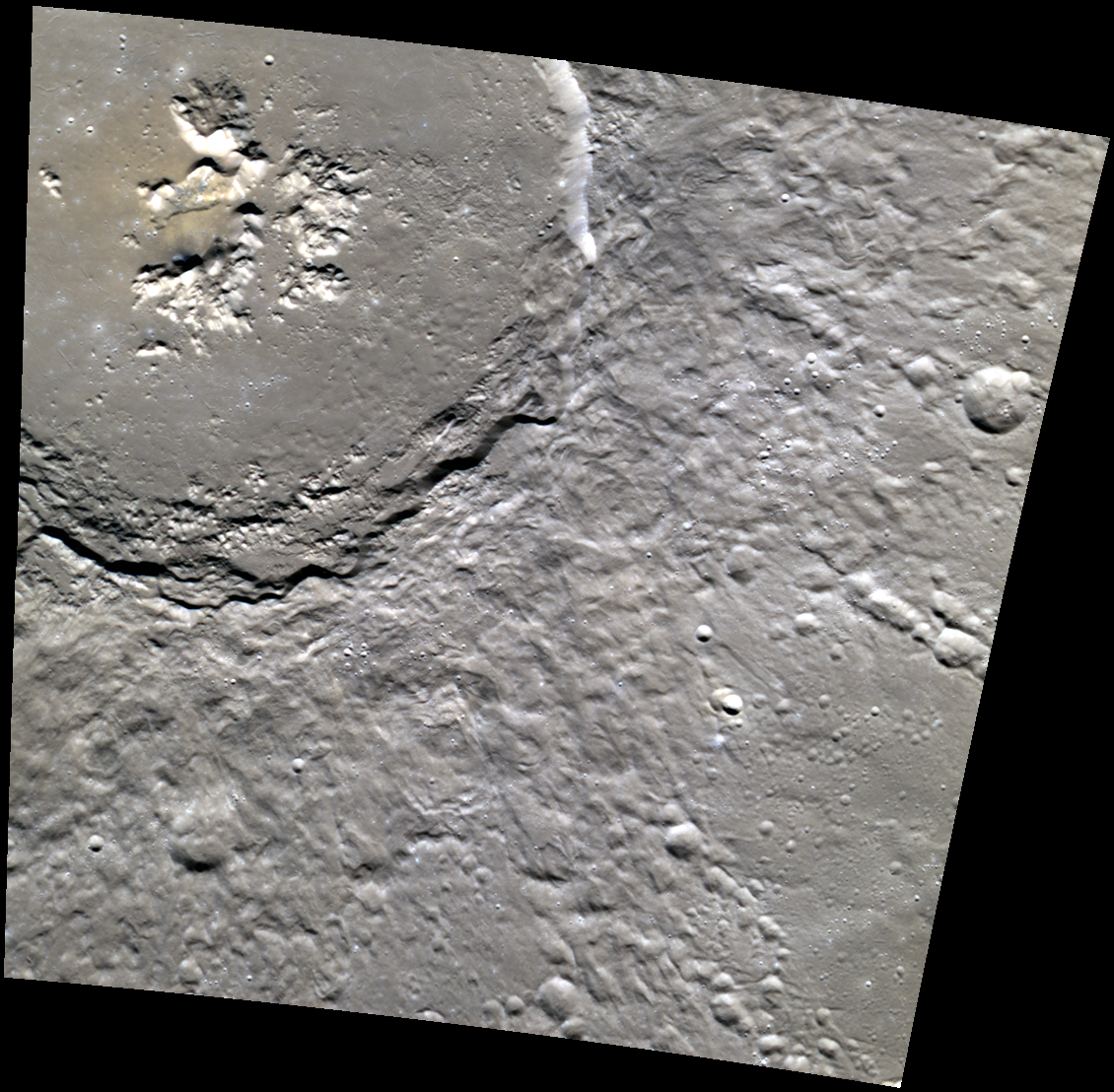
Color image of Abedin

Abedin is a crater on Mercury. It was named after the Bangladeshi artist Zainul Abedin by the IAU in 2009.

Abedin exhibits a complex crater structure with a smooth floor, wall terraces, and a central peak complex. The chains of smaller craters surrounding Abedin are secondary craters formed by ejecta from the initial impact. The northwestern section of Abedin's continuous ejecta blanket appears to have a lower reflectance than the rest of the material adjacent to the crater rim. This pattern suggests that the darker material resided at some depth beneath the northwestern portion of the pre-impact target area and was excavated and redeposited during the crater's formation.

An irregular depression within the central peak complex is evidence of explosive volcanism.

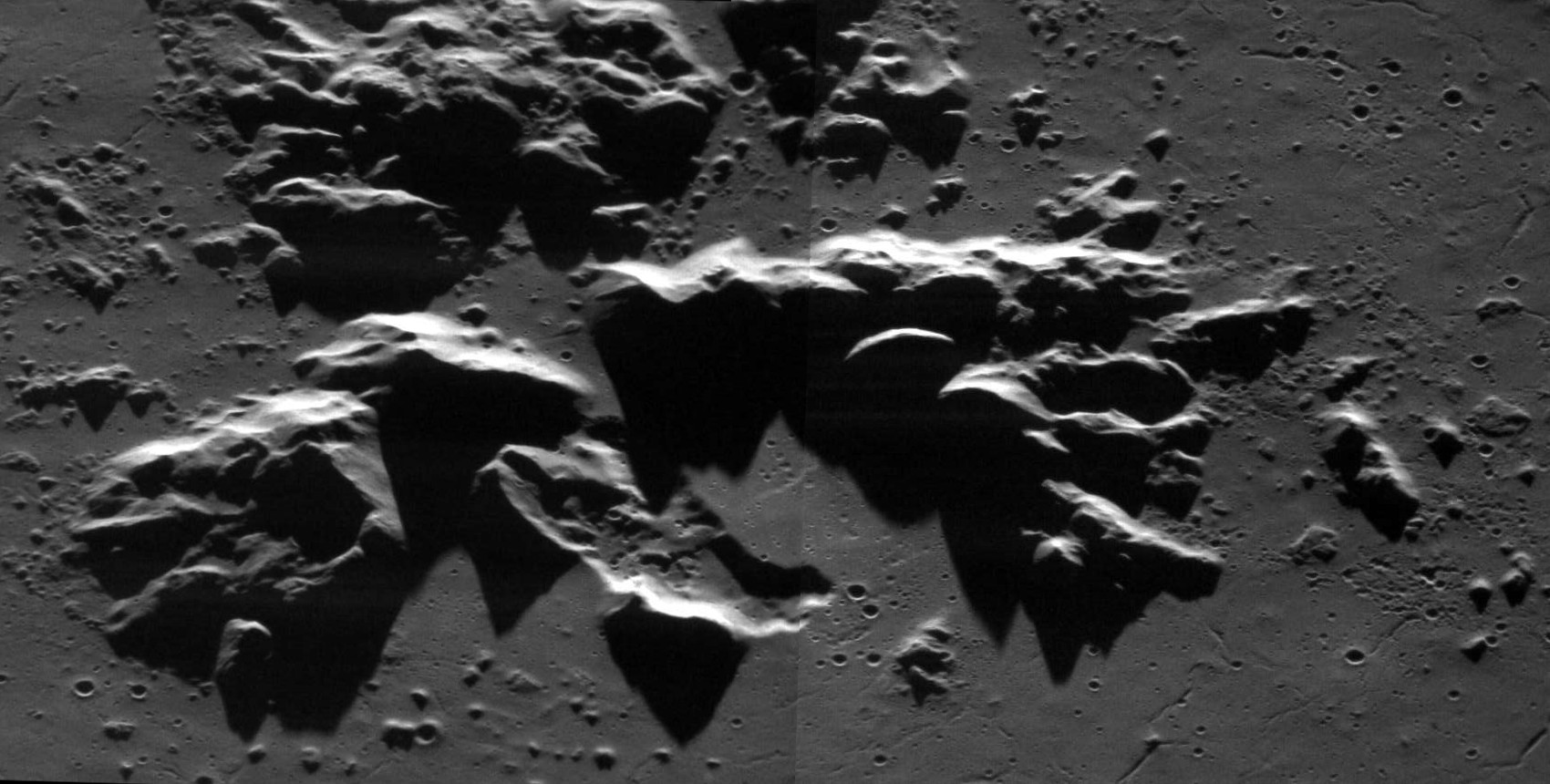
Mosaic of central peaks with the possible volcanic vent below center
