= A. M. Zahurul Haq =

Bangladeshi scientist

A. M. Zahurul Haq is a Bangladeshi scientist and recipient of the Independence Award, Bangladesh's highest civilian award.

== Career ==
Haq was awarded the Independence Award, Bangladesh's highest civilian award, in 1996 for his contribution to science.
