= Zainul Abedin =

Bangladeshi painter and pioneer of the modern art movement

Shilpacharya Zainul Abedin
- জয়নুল আবেদিন
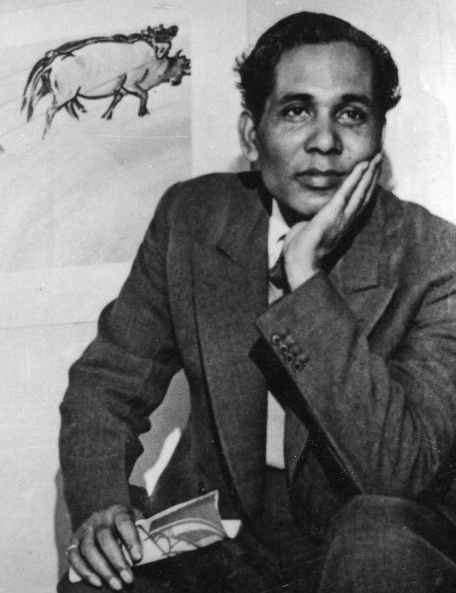
- Zainul Abedin in 1950
- Born: 29 December 1914; East Mymensingh, Bengal Presidency, British India
- Died: 28 May 1976 (aged 61); Dhaka, Bangladesh
- Education: Government Art School, Kolkata; Slade School of Fine Art
- Known for: Painting, drawing
- Notable work: The Struggle; Rebel cow; Famine paintings; Nobanno; Study of a Crow; Two faces
- Spouses: Jahanara Abedin
- Children: 3
- Awards: Pride of Performance (1958); Independence Award (1977)

Signature
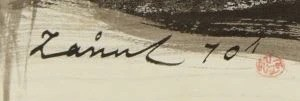

Zainul Abedin (29 December 1914 – 28 May 1976), also known as Shilpacharya (Master of Art) was a Bangladeshi painter. He became well known in 1944 through his series of paintings depicting some of the great famines in Bengal during its British colonial period. After the Partition of Indian subcontinent he moved to East Pakistan (now Bangladesh). In 1948, he helped to establish the Institute of Arts and Crafts (now Faculty of Fine Arts) at the University of Dhaka. The Indian Express has described him as a legendary Bangladeshi painter and activist. Like many of his contemporaries, his paintings on the Bengal famine of 1943 are viewed as his most characteristic works. His homeland honored him with the title "Shilpacharya" (Bengali: শিল্পাচার্য) "Great teacher of the arts" for his artistic and visionary attributes. He was the pioneer of the modern art movement that took place in Bangladesh and was rightly considered by Syed Manzoorul Islam as the founding father of Bangladeshi modern arts, soon after Bangladesh became an independent republic.

In September 2024, Zainul Abedin's painting Untitled (1970) was sold for US$692,048 at the "Modern & Contemporary South Asian Art" auction, organised by Sotheby's in London. It was the highest price ever paid for a Bangladeshi artwork at auction. In March the same year, his oil-on-canvas painting Santal Couples (1963) was sold for US$381,000 at Sotheby's, New York.

== Early life and education ==
Zainul Abedin was born at Kendua (now Netrokona) in Kishoreganj mohokuma of Mymensingh district on 29 December 1914. The Brahmaputra would later appear in many of his paintings and be a source of inspiration all throughout his career. Many of his works framed Brahmaputra and a series of watercolors that Zainul Abedin did as his tribute to the river earned him the Governor's gold medal in an all-India exhibition in 1938. This was the first time when he came under spotlight and this award gave Zainul Abedin the confidence to create his own visual style.

In 1933, Zainul Abedin was admitted to the Government School of Art in Calcutta (now Government College of Art & Craft, Kolkata, India). There, he learned British/European academic styles for five years and later he joined the faculty of the same school after his graduation. He was the first Muslim student to obtain first class distinction from the school. He was dissatisfied with the oriental style and the limitations of European academic style and this led him towards realism. In 1948, with help from a few colleagues, he founded an art institute in Dhaka. Back then, there were no art institutes in the city. Soon after, it went on to be considered the best art institute in Pakistan during its early years. He worked in the Pakistani government for a while. He taught at the institute and among his students was Pakistani artist Mansur Rahi. He also taught Bangladeshi artists such as Monirul Islam and Mohammad Kibria.

After completing his two years of training from Slade School of Fine Art in London, Zainul Abedin began a new style, the 'Bengali style', where the main features were: folk forms with their geometric shapes, sometimes semi-abstract representation, and the use of primary colors. But he lacked the sense of perspective. Later he realized the limitations of folk art, so he went back to the nature, rural life and the daily struggles of man to make art that would be realistic but modern in appearance.

== Paintings ==
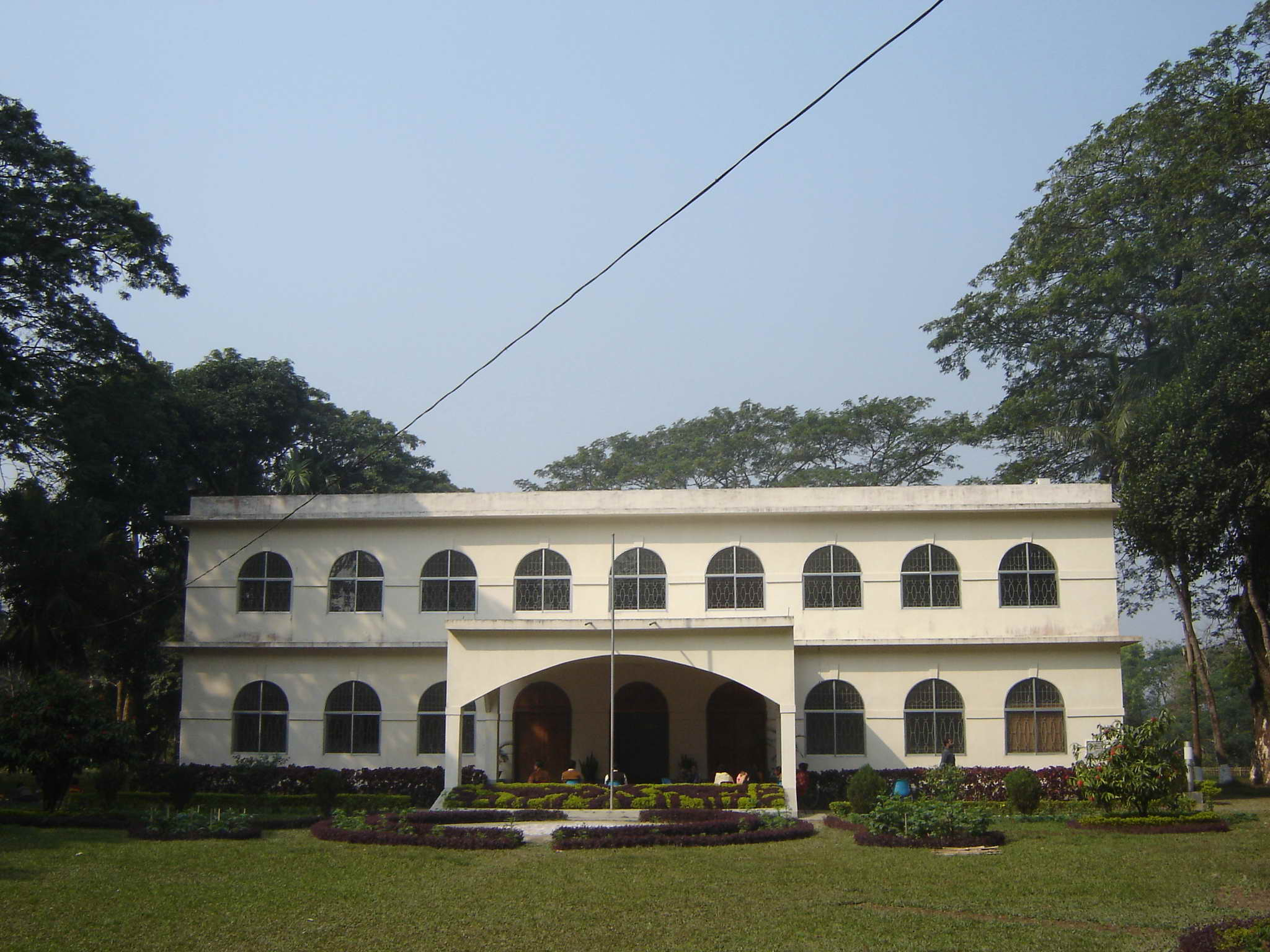
Zainul Abedin Gallary, Mymensingh

Among all the contemporary works of Zainul Abedin, his famine sketches of the 1940s are his most remarkable works. His famine painting set which, exhibited in 1944, brought him even more critical acclaim. The miserable situation of the starving people during the Great Famine of Bengal in 1943 touched his heart. He made his own ink by burning charcoal and used it on cheap, ordinary packing paper. He depicted those starving people who were dying by the road-side. Zainul Abedin not only documented the famine, he also revealed the famine's sinister face through the skeletal figures of people fated to die of starvation.

Zainul Abedin depicted this inhuman story with very human emotions. These drawings became iconic images of human suffering. These sketches helped him find his way in a realistic approach that focused on the human suffering, struggle and protest. He was more socially aware focusing on the working class and their struggles. The Rebel Cow marks a high point of that style. This particular brand of realism combines social inquiry and the protest with higher aesthetics. He was an influential member of the Calcutta Group of progressive artists and was friends with Shahid Suhrawardy and Ahmed Ali of the Progressive Writers' Movement. He made modernist paintings of Santhal people. Notable among them is "Two Santhal Women".

Zainul Abedin visited Palestinian camps in Syria and Jordan in 1970 and made 60–70 paintings of the refugees. He also painted the 1970 Bhola cyclone that devastated East Pakistan.

== Liberation movement ==
Zainul Abedin was involved in the Bengali language movement of East Pakistan. Zainul Abedin was involved in the Bangladesh liberation war movement. He was at the forefront of the cultural movement to re-establish the Bengali identity, marginalized by the Pakistan government. In 1969, Zainul Abedin painted a scroll using Chinese ink, watercolor and wax named Nabanna. This was to celebrate the ongoing non-cooperation movement.

== Post-independence era ==
In 1974, Zainul Abedin received Honorary Doctor of Letters degree from the University of Delhi, India. In 1975, he founded the Folk Art Museum at Sonargaon in Narayanganj, and Zainul Abedin Sangrahashala, a gallery of his own works in Mymensingh. In 1982, 17 of the 70 pictures housed in Zainul Abedin Sangrahashala were stolen. Only 10 were later recovered. His famous painting "Study of a Crow" (Ink Wash) in the collection of Professor Ahmed Ali is listed in the book Arts in Pakistan by Jalaluddin Ahmed, 1952, including an exclusive monologue on him published by FOMMA, Karachi, along with his many Famine Series paintings of 1943.

== Personal life and death ==
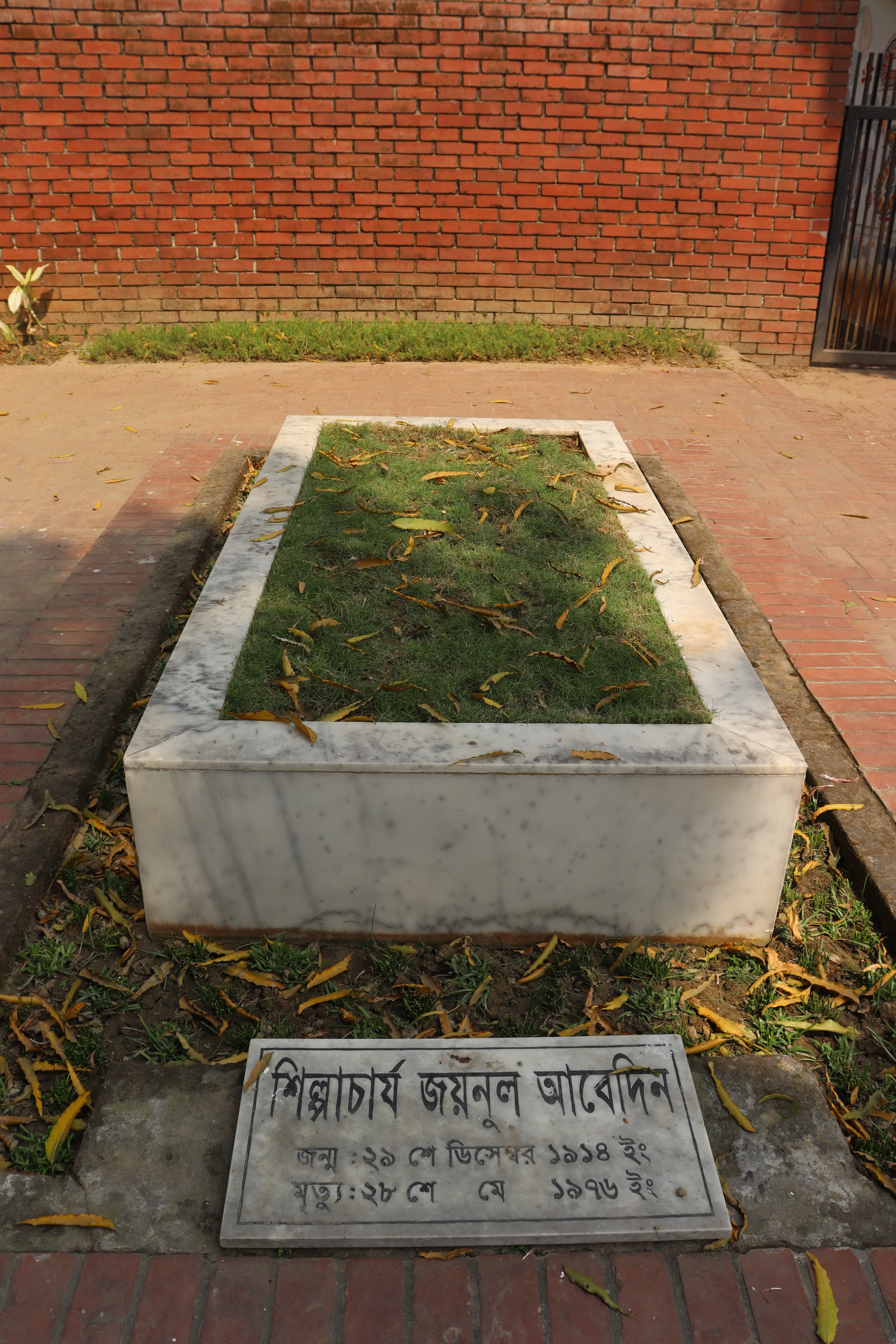
Grave of Zainul Abedin

Zainul was married to Jahanara Abedin (d. 2025). Together they had three sons – Mainul Abedin being the youngest. Zainul Abedin developed lung cancer and died on 28 May 1976 in Dhaka. Two faces was his last painting, completed shortly before his death. He was buried beside the Dhaka University Central Mosque.

== Legacy ==
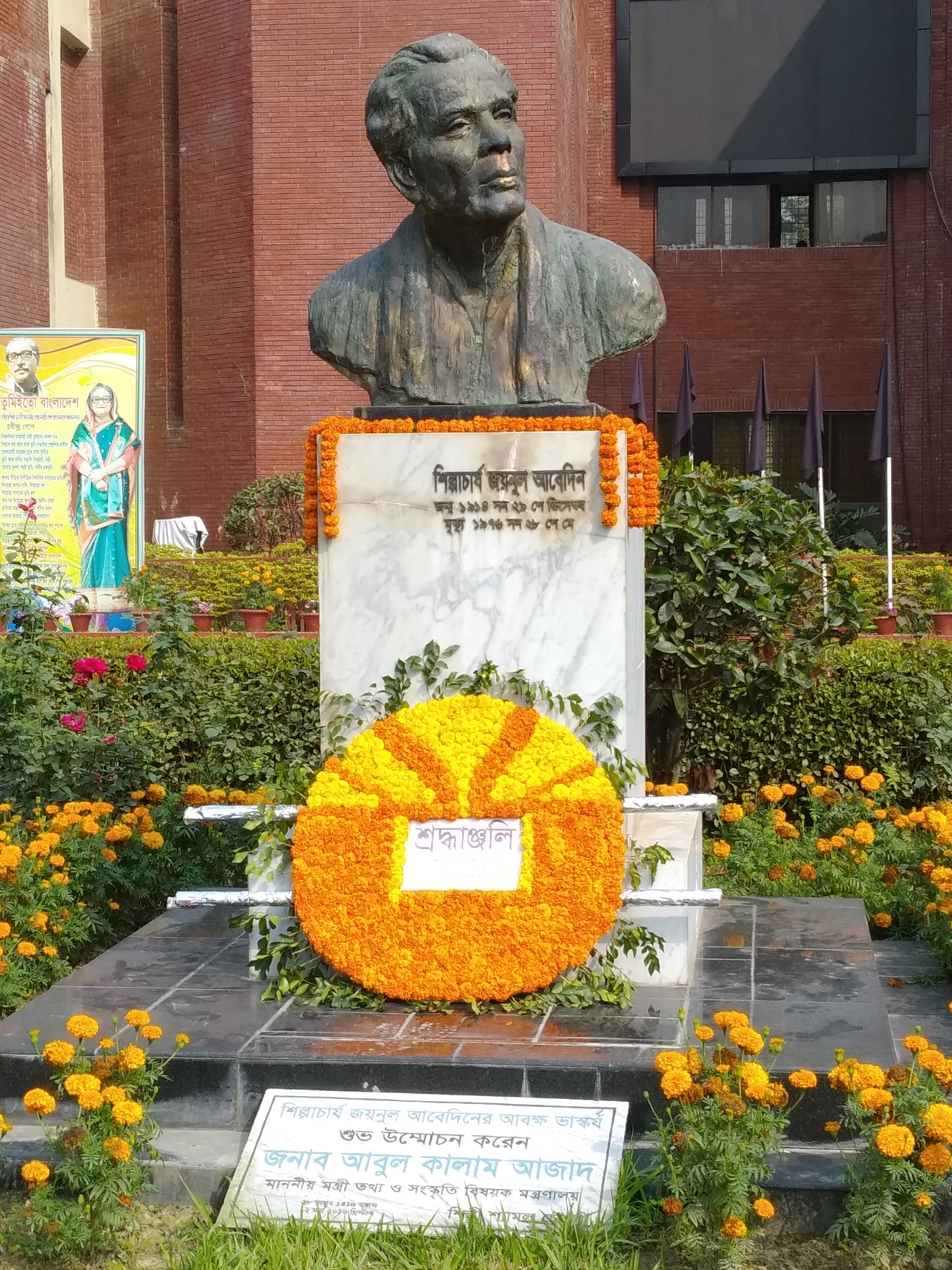
Sculpture of Zainul Abedin in the premises of Folk Art Museum

In 2009, a crater on the planet Mercury was named Abedin after the painter. His birthday was celebrated in Bangladesh, with a festival in University of Dhaka and children's art competition in Shilpacharya Zainul Abedin Sangrahashala (art gallery). An academic building of the University of Rajshahi, has recently been named after him which is the home to its fine arts faculty. His sketch was auctioned at auction house Bonhams. Zainul Abedin Museum in Mymensingh, Bangladesh is dedicated to his work.

In December 2014, Bangladeshi various socio-cultural organisations have arranged elaborate birth centenary programmes throughout the country. On 29 December 2019, Google celebrated his 105th birthday with a Google Doodle.

== Gallery ==
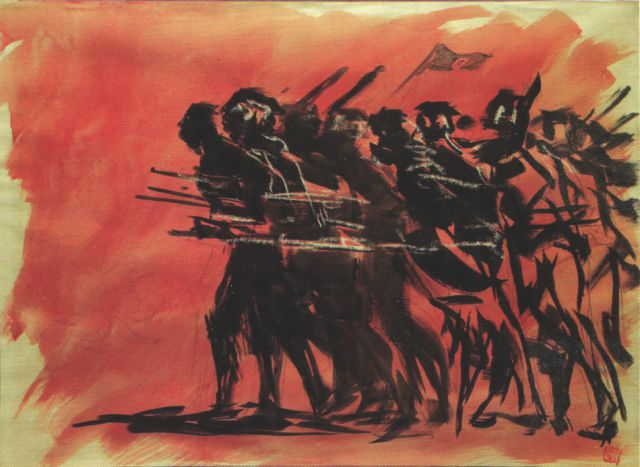
Bangladesh Liberation war, 1971

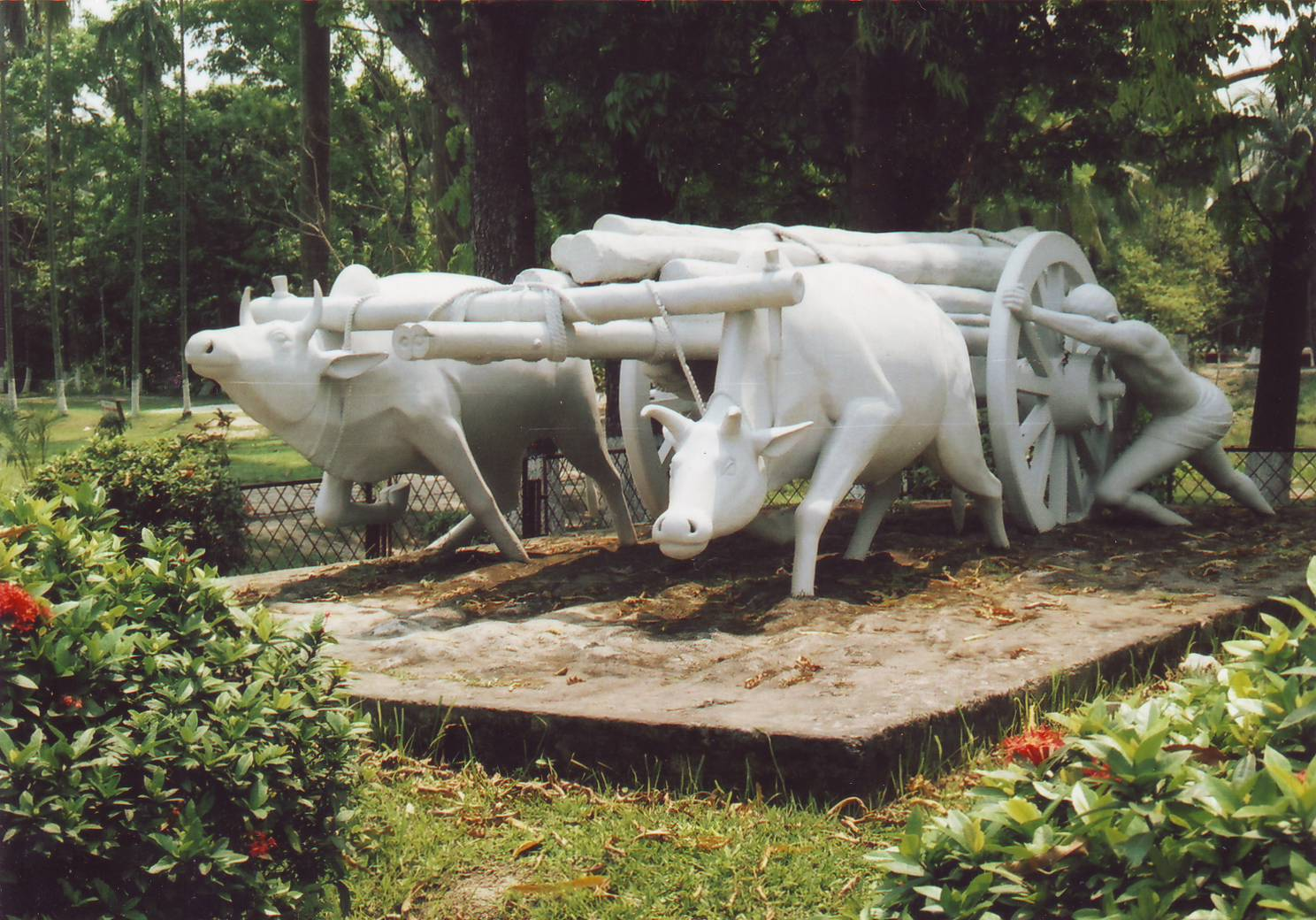
Sculpture based on the painting The Struggle
