= Mohammad Kibria =

Bangladeshi painter

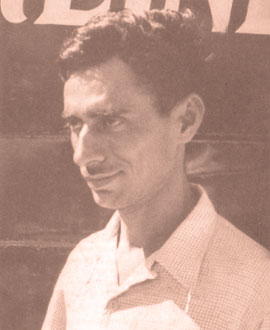
- Kibria in 1958
- Born: c. 1929; Birbhum, Bengal Presidency, British India
- Died: 7 June 2011 (aged 81–82); Dhaka, Bangladesh
- Education: University of Calcutta; Tokyo University of the Arts; University of Dhaka
- Occupations: artist, faculty
- Awards: Ekushey Padak (1983); Independence Day Award (1999)

Mohammad Kibria (c. 1929 – 7 June 2011) was a Bangladeshi artist. He was awarded Ekushey Padak in 1983 and Independence Day Award in 1999 by the Government of Bangladesh.

== Early life and career ==
Kibria graduated from the Government School of Art at the University of Calcutta in 1950. Kibria moved to Dhaka in 1951 and started his career as a school teacher at Nawabpur High School. In 1954, prompted by his teacher and mentor Zainul Abedin, Kibria joined the then Government College of Arts and Crafts (now Faculty of Fine Arts, University of Dhaka) as a lecturer. In the early days of his career, however, Kibria's artistic focus shifted from the neo-Bengal School to the European masters including Pablo Picasso and Henri Matisse as well as to the emerging style of art such as impressionism, post-impressionism and expressionism.

Kibria studied at the Tokyo University of the Arts from 1959 until 1962. He was exposed to the international museums where he got the chance to watch works of the modern masters and received training under world-famous contemporary abstractionists.

== Death ==
Kibria died of old-age complications at LabAid Hospital in Dhaka on 7 June 2011 at the age of 82.
