= Abdul Hashim =

Abdul Hashim is a Bangladeshi author and recipient of the Independence Award, Bangladesh's highest civilian award.

== Career ==
Hashim was awarded the Independence Award, Bangladesh's highest civilian award, in 1996 for his contribution to literature.
