= Syed Mohammad Hossein =

Bangladeshi lawyer

Justice Syed Mohammad Hossain
- Born: 1924
- Died: 19 October 1986 (aged 61–62); Dhaka
- Citizenship: Bangladesh
- Occupation: Justice
- Children: Kashefa Hussain

Justice Syed Mohammad Hossain (1924 - 2 April 1986) was a renowned lawyer from Bangladesh. He was awarded the "Independence Day Award" in 1997 for his outstanding contribution to the legal profession.

== Career ==
Hossein served as a judge of the Supreme Court of Bangladesh.

Hossein authored a book titled "Banglar Kotha".

Hossein received the Independence Award, Bangladesh's highest civilian award, in 1997 for his contributions to the establishment of the rule of law.
