= List of Bangladeshi films of 1996 =

A list of Bangladeshi films released in 1996.

== Releases ==
Title	Director	Cast	Genre	Notes	Release date	Ref.
Poka Makorer Ghor Bosoti	Mohammad Akhtaruzzaman	Bobita, Alamgir, Khaled Khan	Drama		1 November	
Ajante	Dilip Biswas	Alamgir, Shabana, Sohel Rana, Suchorita, Riaz, Sonia, ATM Shamsuzzaman	Romance		2 August	
Dipu Number Two	Morshedul Islam	Bulbul Ahmed, Bobita, Arun Saha, Shubhashish, Abul Khair, Golam Mostafa, Dolly Zahur	Adventure, Thriller, Family	Children's film		
Nirmom	Alamgir	Shabana, Alamgir, Shabnaz				
Bichar Hobe	Shah Alam Kiran	Salman Shah, Shabnur, Dolly Zahur, Anwar Hossain, Humayun Faridi, Dildar	Drama, Romance		21 February	
Ei Ghor Ei Songsar	Malek Afsary	Salman Shah, Bristi, Bulbul Ahmed, Rosy Afsari, Ali Raz	Drama		5 April	
Priyojon	Rana Naser	Salman Shah, Shilpi, Riaz, Dolly Zahur, Sadek Bacchu, Prabir Mitra, Dildar, Nasrin	Romance		14 June	
Tomake Chai	Motin Rahman	Salman Shah, Shabnur, Khalil, Sharmili Ahmed, Ariful Haque	Romance		21 June	
The Unknown Bird - Achin Pakhi	Tanvir Mokammel		Documentary	A documentary film on the Bauls		
Shopner Prithibi	Badol Khondokar	Salman Shah, Shabnur, Bobita, Rajib, Dildar, Amal Bose	Romance		12 July	
Sotter Mrittu Nei	Chotku Ahmed	Salman Shah, Shahnaz, Shabana, Alamgir, Rajib, Raisul Islam Asad	Romance, Drama		13 September	
Swapnar School - A School for Swapna	Tanvir Mokammel		Documentary	A documentary on the alternative schools for the poor adults		
Jibon Songshar	Jakir Hossain Raju	Salman Shah, Shabnur, Faruq, Bobita, Misha Sawdagor	Drama, Romance		18 October	
Mayer Odhikar	Shibli Sadik	Salman Shah, Shabnaz, Alamgir, Bobita, Ferdousi Mazumder, Humayun Faridi, Nasir Khan	Drama		6 December	
Chaowa Theke Paowa	M M Sarker	Salman Shah, Shabnur, Dolly Zahur, Prabir Mitra, Dildar, Ahmed Sharif			20 December	
Bachar Lorai	Syed Harun	Ilias Kanchan, Diti, Riaz, Sonia, Prabir Mitra, Sharmili Ahmed, Mizu Ahmed	Action			
Mithyar Mrityu	Chotku Ahmed	Shabana, Alamgir, Riaz, Sonia	Drama, Action			
Durjoy	Malek Afsary	Shabana, Alamgir, Humayun Faridi, Ilias Kanchan, Diti, Rajib	Action		6 December	
Ruti	Nadeem Mahmud	Manna, Shahnaz, Wasimul Bari Rajib, Dildar, Prabir Mitra, Khaleda Aktar Kolpona, Nasreen				

== See also ==
- 1996 in Bangladesh
