= List of Bangladeshi films of 1994 =

A list of Bangladeshi films released in 1994.

== Releases ==
Title	Director	Cast	Genre	Notes	Release date	Ref.
Aguner Poroshmoni	Humayun Ahmed	Bipasha Hayat, Asaduzzaman Noor, Abul Hayat, Dolly Zahur, Dilara Zaman	War, Drama	Based on Bangladesh Liberation War		
Tumi Amar	Jahirul Haque	Salman Shah, Shabnur, Prabir Mitra, Don	Romance		22 May	
Antore Antore	Shibly Sadik	Salman Shah, Moushumi, Rajib, Dildar, Nasir Khan, Anwara	Romance		10 June	
Chaka	Morshedul Islam	Golan Razul Babu, Ashish Khandokar, Amirul Haque Chowdhury, Abul Khair, Dilara Zaman	Drama	Based on Selim Al Deen's story		
Desh Premik	Kazi Hayat	Alamgir, Manna, Champa	Drama			
Sujan Sakhi	Shah Alam Kiran	Salman Shah, Shabnur, Raisul Islam Asad, Sadek Bacchu, Anwara	Romance	Remake of Sujan Sokhi (1975)	12 August	
Bikkhov	Mohammad Hannan	Salman Shah, Shabnur, Bulbul Ahmed, Dolly Zahur, Dildar, Nasir Khan, Rajib, Sharmili	Action, Drama		9 September	
Sneho	Gazi Mazharul Anwar	Salman Shah, Moushumi, Shabana, Alamgir	Drama		16 September	
Prem Juddho	Jibon Rahman	Salman Shah, Lima, Prabir Mitra, Sharmili Ahmed	Action, Romance		23 December	

== See also ==
- 1994 in Bangladesh
- List of Bangladeshi films of 1995
- List of Bangladeshi films
- Cinema of Bangladesh
- Dhallywood
