= List of Bangladeshi films of 1997 =

This is a list of Bangladeshi films released in 1997.

== Releases ==
Title	Director	Cast	Genre	Notes	Release date	Ref.
Ekhono Onek Raat	Khan Ataur Rahman	Faruq, Ali Raz, Bulbul Ahmed, Bobita, Suchorita, Sharmili Ahmed, Enam Ahmed, Khan Ataur Rahman, Falguni Ahmed, Khan Asif Agun	War, history, drama	Based on Bangladesh Liberation War		
Hangor Nodi Grenade - The Mother	Chashi Nazrul Islam	Sohel Rana, Champa, Suchorita, Aruna Biswas	War, drama, history	Based on Bangladesh Liberation War, adapted from Selina Hossain's novel		
Prem Piyashi	Reza Hashmot	Salman Shah, Shabnur, Anwara, Rajib, Tushar Khan, Misha Sawdagor	Romance		18 April	
Dukhai	Morshedul Islam	Raisul Islam Asad, Rokeya Prachi, Abur Khair, Chandni	Drama	Disaster film		
Coolie	Chotku Ahmed	Omar Sani, Popy, Amin Khan, Mizu Ahmed, Dolly Zahur, Humayun Faridi	Action		16 May	
Jibon O Abhiboy			Documentary			
Shopner Nayok	Nasir Khan	Salman Shah, Shabnur, Shahin Alam, Sonia, Dolly Zahur, ATM Shamsuzzaman, Nasir Khan	Romance		4 July	
Shudhu Tumi	Kazi Morshed	Salman Shah, Shama, Dildar, Dolly Zahur, Humayun Faridi	Romance		18 July	
Anondo Osru	Shibly Sadik	Salman Shah, Shabnur, Kanchi, Dolly Zahur, Khaleda Akter Kolpona, Dildar, Sadek Bacchu, Humayun Faridi	Romance		1 August	
Buker Bhitor Agun	Chatku Ahmed	Salman Shah, Shabnur, Ferdous Ahmed, Rajib, Raisul Islam Asad, Syed Hasan Imam	Action, romance		5 September	
Praner Cheye Priyo	Mohammad Hannan	Riaz, Ravina, Bulbul Ahmed, Bobita, Rajib, Humayun Faridi, Anwar Hossain, Abul Hayat	Drama, romance			

== See also ==
- 1997 in Bangladesh
