= Anupam Recording Media =

Bangladeshi record label and film production company

- Founded: 1984
- Founder: Anwar Hossain
- Status: Active
- Distributor: Anupam Media
- Genre: Miscellaneous (Music, film)
- Country of origin: Bangladesh
- Location: Dhaka, Bangladesh
- Official website: anupamrm.com

Anupam Recording Media is a film production company and record label in Bangladesh.

== History ==
Anupam Recording Media was founded by Anwar Hossain in 1984. The organization's YouTube channel created a remarkable record by surpassing 3 million subscribers and received the Silver Creator Award from YouTube. Currently, the channel has approximately 13.2 million subscribers.

== Films ==
- Khairun Sundari - Ferdous Ahmed and Moushumi
- Bhalobaslei Ghor Bandha Jay Na - Shakib Khan and Apu Biswas
- Churiwala - Ferdous Ahmed
- Shwapner Purush - Riaz and Shabnur
- Tumi Boro Bhagya Boti - Riaz and Shabnur
- Bhulna Amay - Bapparaj and Shabnur
- Itihas - Kazi Maruf and Ratna
- Sotyer Mrittu Nei - Salman Shah and Shahnaz
- Mone Pore Tomake - Riaz and Ria Sen
- Shanto Keno Mastan - Manna and Shahnaz
- Jhinuk Mala - Farooq and Suchanda
- Rajlokhi Srikanto - Shabana, Bulbul Ahmed and Razzaq
- Kuli - Omar Sani, Popy and Amin Khan
- Antare Antare - Salman Shah and Moushumi
- Shopner Basor - Shakib Khan, Riaz and Shabnur
- Phul Nebona Ashru Nebona - Shakib Khan and Shabnur
- Porena Chokher Polok - Shakib Khan and Ratna
- Priya Amar Priya - Shakib Khan and Sahara
- Bolona Kabul - Shakib Khan and Apu Biswas
- Bikkhov - Salman Shah and Shabnur
