= List of Bangladeshi films of 1998 =

This is a list of Bangladeshi films released in 1998.

== Releases ==
Title	Director	Cast	Genre	Notes	Release date	Ref.
Hothat Brishti	Basu Chatterjee	Ferdous, Priyanka Trivedi, Manoj Mitra, Raisul Islam Asad, Sreelekha Mitra, June Malia, Amol Bose	Romance	Bangladesh-India joint venture film		
Vondo	Shahidul Islam Khokon	Rube, Tamanna, Humayun Faridi, Rajeeb, Khalil, ATM Shamsuzzaman	Action, comedy		15 May	
Shanto Keno Mastan	Montazur Rahman Akbar	Manna, Shahnaz, Razzak, Dipjol, Humayun Faridi, Dildar	Action		31 July	
Teji	Kazi Hayat	Manna, Eka, Dildar, Abul Hayat, Dipjol	Action, romance			
Moner Moto Mon	Montazur Rahman Akbar	Amin Khan, Mohini, Victor Banerjee, Uttam Mohanty, Aparajita Mohanty,	Romance	Bangladesh-India joint venture; also released in Oriya language in Odisha, India		
Bhalobashi Tomake	Mohammad Hannan	Riaz, Shabnur, Bobita, ATM Shamsuzzaman, Dildar, Rajeeb, Humayun Faridi	Romance			
Bidroho Charidike - The Forces	Mohammad Hannan	Riaz, Popy, Humayun Faridi, Nasima Khan, Miju Ahmed, Anwar Hossain, Rajeeb	Action			
Buk Bhora Bhalobasha	Chotku Ahmed	Riaz, Shabnur, Abul Hayat, Dolly Zahur, Bapparaj	Romance			
Prithibi Tomar Amar	Badal Khandokar	Riaz, Shabnur, Razzak, Bobita, ATM Shamsuzzaman	Drama, romance			
Kajer Meye	Azadi Hasnat Firoz	Riaz, Shabnur, Ali Raz, Amol Bose, Sharmili Ahmed	Drama			

== See also ==
- 1998 in Bangladesh
