= Shudhu Tumi (1997 film) =

1997 Bangladeshi film

- Album cover of the film
- Directed by: Kazi Morshed
- Screenplay by: Kazi Morshed
- Story by: Kazi Morshed
- Produced by: Shahidur Rahman Shahid; Muhammad Asad
- Starring: Salman Shah; Shama; Humayun Faridi; Dildar; Dolly Johur; Parvez Gangua
- Cinematography: Sirajul Islam
- Edited by: Saiful Islam
- Music by: Alauddin Ali
- Production company: A S Movies
- Release date: 18 July 1997
- Country: Bangladesh
- Language: Bengali

Shudhu Tumi is a 1997 Bangladeshi romantic drama film written and directed by Kazi Morshed. Produced by Shahidur Rahman Shahid and Muhammad Asad under the banner of Bari Studios. It is stars Salman Shah and Shama (her debut) in as the lead role alongside Humayun Faridi, Dildar, Dolly Johur and others. It is released on 18 July 1997 and it is the 25th film released by Salman Shah.

== Cast ==
- Salman Shah as Akash
- Shama as Meghla
- Humayun Faridi as Amir Chakladar
- Dildar as Premkumar Mama
- Dolly Johur as Akash's aunty
- Parvez Gangua as Katari
- Boby
- Montu Chowdhury
- Abdul Aziz
- Michael Tukku
- Syed Akhtar Ali as Alomoti's father
- Sharmin as Monowara Begum
- Nasreen as Alomoti
- Alka Sarker
- Firoza
- Jesmin
- Shamsuddin
- Dulal Sarker
- Daniel Tara
- Kishore
- Ramjan Khan
- Juwel

== Sound track ==
The movie's music is composed by Alauddin Ali and lyrics written by Moniruzzaman Monir and Ashraf Babu and Agun, Kanak Chapa and Lipi Nasreen have given voice to the song.

No.	Title	Lyrics	Music	Singers	Length
1.	"Ei Nirjon Niralay Nijhum Bone"	Moniruzzaman Monir	Alauddin Ali	Agun and Kanak Chapa	5:02
2.	"Moner Kotha Mukhe Ami Bolte Pari Na"	Moniruzzaman Monir	Alauddin Ali	Kanak Chapa	4:26
3.	"Tumi Jokhoni Kache Thako"	Moniruzzaman Monir	Alauddin Ali	Agun and Kanak Chapa	4:40
4.	"Dekhini Tomay Ogo"	Ashraf Babu	Alauddin Ali	Lipi Nasrin	4:31
5.	"Valobashar Cheye Boro Pawa"	Moniruzzaman Monir	Alauddin Ali	Kanak Chapa	3:49
6.	"Tumi Amar Alomoti"	Ashraf Babu	Alauddin Babu	Agun and Lipi Nasrin	3:53

== Production ==
Salman Shah died during the making of this film, so another actor who looked like him played his incomplete role, but only Salman Shah's name appears on the screen.

This film actress Shama is the only deceased actress who acted opposite Salman Shah. He was seen in the movie Shudhu Tumi released in 1997 Shortly after Salman's death, she died in a road accident.

== Release & reception ==
The film was released after Salman Shah's death on 18 July 1997 in Bangladesh.

bdnews24 wrote that "Some of Salman's other films, including 'Dream Hero', 'Shudhu Tumi', 'Ananda Asru' and 'Buker Bhart Agun', have received positive reviews". The Daily Ittefaq wrote that "After his (Salman Shah) death, the films that followed were widely appreciated by the audience and commercially successful. Those movies are - 'Sotter Mrittu Nei', 'Jibon Sansar', 'Mayer Odhikar', 'Chawa Theke Pawa', 'Prem Priyoshi', 'Shopner Nayok', 'Shudhu Tumi', 'Anondo Osru' and 'Buker Bhitor Agun'."
