= Denmohor =

Bangladeshi film

- Movie poster
- Directed by: Shafi Bikrampuri
- Screenplay by: Shafi Bikrampuri, Chotku Ahmed
- Starring: Salman Shah; Moushumi; Wasimul Bari Rajib; Ahmed Sharif
- Cinematography: Shafi Bikrampuri
- Music by: Alauddin Ali
- Release date: 3 March 1995
- Running time: 155 minutes
- Country: Bangladesh
- Language: Bengali

Denmohor is a 1995 Bangladeshi film starring Salman Shah and Moushumi. This film was an official remake of 1991 superhit Bollywood film Sanam Bewafa.

== Cast ==
- Salman Shah
- Moushumi
- Wasimul Bari Rajib
- Ahmed Sharif
- Mirana Zaman
- Suja Khondokar

== Reception ==
The film was well received by the audience. It has received a staggering 7.8 rating out of ten at the Internet Movie Database.

== Music ==
Alauddin Ali worked as the music director of this film. Lyrics are written by Moniruzzaman Monir, Gazi Mazharul Anwar, Masud Karim, Pulak Bandyopadhyay and sung by singers like Runa Laila, Khalid Hassan Milu, Andrew Kishore, Sabina Yasmin and Agun.

=== List of tracks ===
No.	Title	Music	Singer	Length
1.	"Mousum Elo Bhalobashar"	Alauddin Ali	Runa Laila	5:32
2.	"Shudhu Ekbar Shudhu Ekbar"	Alauddin Ali	Khalid Hassan Milu and Sabina Yasmin	6:22
3.	"Ami Tomar Preme Pagol"	Alauddin Ali	Andrew Kishore	4:36
4.	"Amar Moner Bhetore"	Alauddin Ali	Runa Laila
5.	"O Rongila Dulabhai"	Alauddin Ali	Runa Laila
6.	"Amar Dehr Achhe Ei Mon"	Alauddin Ali	Sabina Yasmin and Agun
7.	"Apon Manush Koira Diya Por"	Alauddin Ali	Syed Abdul Hadi

== Release ==
The film released on 3 March 1995 at the festival of Eid-ul-Fitr.
