= Sonia (Bangladeshi actress) =

Bangladeshi actress

- সোনিয়া
- Occupations: Actress, model

Sonia is a Bangladeshi actress and model that acted in more than 50 Bangladeshi films.

== Biography ==
Sonia learned dancing from Bulbul Lalitakala Academy. Before coming to Dhallywood her dance performances were telecasted on many programs of Bangladesh Television.

Sonia made her debut on Dhallywood with Mastan Raja in 1991. But, in Prem Shakti she made her debut as a heroine where her co-star was Bapparaj. In 1995 she acted in Shopner Thikana where her co-star was Salman Shah. Her last released film was Shoshurbari Jindabad.

Sonia also acted in television dramas. She also became model on the advertisements of Middle Soap and Citizen Television. She is now living in London.

== Selected filmography ==
- Byathar Daan (1989) - Young Panna
- Mastan Raja (1991)
- Prem Shakti (1993)
- Voyongkor Saat Din (1993)
- Kaliya (1994) - Minu
- Ghatok (1994) - Bishakha
- Swapner Thikana (1995) - Farha
- Banglar Nayok (1995) - Julie
- Ojante (1996) - Tithi
- Prem Protishodh
- Shoto Jonomer Prem
- Aaj Gaye Holud (2000) - Shila Majumder
- Tochnoch
- Ora Desher Sontan
- Poran Kokila
- Loveletter
- Shoshurbari Zindabad (2002) - Riya Chowdhury
- Juari (2002)
- Shahoshi Manush Chai (2003) - Tuski
- Bou Shashurir Juddho (2003) - Rubi Chowdhury
- Zero Zero Seven (007) (2004)

== Selected television dramas ==
- Porshi
- Beder Meye
- Nana Rokom Manush
- Khan Bahadurer Tin Chhele
- Pranto Rekhay
- Babree Namer Meyeti
- Dhusor Prohor
