= Sujon Sokhi =

Sujon Sokhi may refer to:

- Sujon Sokhi (1975 film)
- Sujon Sokhi (1994 film)
