= Kanchi (actress) =

Bangladeshi actress

Kanchi কাঞ্চি
- Born: Nazirpur, Pirojpur District, Barishal, Bangladesh
- Occupation: Actress
- Known for: acting
- Notable work: Anondo Osru

Kanchi is a Bangladeshi film actress. She acted in Anondo Osru in 1997 where Salman Shah was her co-star. She also acted in Prithibi Amare Chai Na in 1996 which was the first film of Ferdous Ahmed as hero. She is probably currently residing in London or America.

== Selected filmography ==
- Anondo Osru
- Prithibi Amare Chai Na
- Tumi Shudhu Tumi
- Mrityu Koto bhoyonkor
- Demag
- Shesh Thikana
