= Shopner Thikana =

- Official poster
- Directed by: M.A. Khalek
- Written by: Chotku Ahmed (dialogue); Chotku Ahmed (screenplay); Nurul Islam Parvez (story)
- Produced by: Nurul Islam Parvez
- Starring: Salman Shah; Shabnur; Sonia; Wasimul Bari Rajib; Abul Hayat; Dolly Johur
- Cinematography: Mozaffor Hossain
- Edited by: Atiqur Rahman Mallik
- Music by: Alam Khan
- Production company: Atlas Movies
- Distributed by: Atlas Movies
- Release date: 11 May 1995
- Running time: 155 minutes
- Country: Bangladesh
- Language: Bangla
- Box office: ৳19 crore (equivalent to ৳117 crore or US$9.5 million in 2024)

Shopner Thikana (Bengali: স্বপ্নের ঠিকানা; Translation: The Address of the Dream) is a Bangladeshi feature film released on 11 May 1995 directed by M. A. Khaleq. This romantic drama film was released on Eid vacation and was a huge success throughout Bangladesh.

== Plot ==
Sumon is wealthy, whereas Sumi Chowdhury is poor. Despite this, they are childhood friends who immediately fall in love. Farha, Sumon's other childhood friend and the daughter of his father's wealthy friend and business partner, also loves him, but he only sees her as a friend. Sumon's parents and Farha's father arrange their marriage, much to Farha's delight. However, Sumon immediately rejects the idea because he loves Sumi. When Farha finds out, she is heartbroken and jealous, vowing to break them up. This further complicates the love triangle. Then, in an accident caused by henchmen working for Farha's father, Sumon loses his memory. Sumon's mother dies of shock upon learning of his memory loss. On the day of the arranged wedding, Farha commits suicide in front of Sumon, Sumi and her father because she regrets forcing Sumon into the marriage and losing him as a result.

== Cast ==
- Salman Shah as Sumon
- Shabnur as Sumi Chowdhury
- Sonia as Farha
- Rajib as Farha's father
- Abul Hayat as Sumon's father
- Dolly Johur as Sumi's mother
- Prabir Mitra as Sumi's father
- Dildar as Fazil Ali
- Black Anwar
- Syed Akhter Ali

== Soundtrack ==
The music of this film was directed by Alam Khan and lyrics were penned by Moniruzzaman Monir.

No.	Track	Singer(s)
1	"O Sathire Jeona Kokhono Dure"	Andrew Kishore and Sabina Yasmin
2	"O Sathire Jeona Kokhono Dure" (sad)	Andrew Kishore and Sabina Yasmin
3	"Tumi Amar Jiboner Shuru"	Andrew Kishore and Sabina Yasmin
4	"Eidin Seidin Konodin"	Andrew Kishore and Sabina Yasmin
5	"Jodi Sundor Ek Khan Bou Paitam"	Moloy Chaki and Rizia Parvin
6	"Nil Sagor Par Hoye"	Runa Laila

== Release ==
Shopner Thikana was released on 11 May 1995 on Eid vacation.
