= Hridoyer Bandhon =

2001 film by F. I. Manik

- VCD Cover
- Directed by: F I Manik
- Written by: Naseem Mukri (India); Mosharaf Hossain Tula
- Produced by: Mosharaf Hossain Tula; Arif Mahmud
- Starring: Riaz; Shabnur; Amin Khan; Keya; Wasimul Bari Rajib; Anwara
- Cinematography: Z H Mintu
- Edited by: Anowar Hossain Montu
- Music by: Shawkat Ali Emon
- Distributed by: M M Films Int’l.
- Release date: 16 December 2001
- Running time: 153 minutes
- Country: Bangladesh
- Language: Bengali

Hridoyer Bandhon (transl. The bond of the heart) also (Bengali: হৃদয়ের বন্ধন) is a Bangladeshi Bengali-language film, which was directed by Bangladeshi famous film director F I Manik and produced by Mosharaf Hossain Tula. The film was released on Eid-ul-Fitr 2001. It is a romance and family drama based film. Stars include Amin Khan, Shabnur, Riaz, Keya, Wasimul Bari Rajib and Anwara. The film got great popularity throughout all categories of film viewers in Bangladesh. The film is an unofficial remake of the 2000 Hindi Language film titled Dhadkan starring Akshay Kumar, Sunil Shetty, Shilpa Shetty and Mahima Chaudhry.

== Plot ==
Sagarika comes from an extremely wealthy and influential family. Her father, Raihan Chowdhury, is a successful businessman who has high hopes for her. However, Sagarika is in love with Raju, who is very poor and often can't afford to dress well. Raju loves Sagarika too and wants to marry her, so he must meet her father.

When Sagarika suggests marrying Raju to her parents, they are furious and refuse outright because they cannot accept him. Moreover, they have chosen a wealthy suitor from Chittagong for her. Not wanting to hurt her parents, Sagarika agrees to marry Akash, whom they believe to be a perfect match for her.

Akash is a principled man who believes in treating his wife with respect and honouring her sensibilities. Nevertheless, he is initially unable to win Sagarika's love, and their marriage is on the brink of collapse. However, after witnessing her husband's magnanimity in forgiving and accepting her, Sagarika realises that she has fallen in love with him.

She then leads a blissful life as an ideal wife for three years. But on their third wedding anniversary, Raju returns with the intention of winning Sagarika back. He is now a wealthy businessman and Sagarika finds herself torn between her husband and her former lover. However, she is now in love with her husband and has no wish to return to Raju. When Raju realises that she does not want to return to him, he becomes intent on ruining her life. Ultimately, though, the truth prevails when Sagarika reveals to Raju that she is pregnant with Akash's child. Raju realises his folly and accepts Mitali, his friend and business partner, into his life as she has secretly loved him all along.

== Cast ==
- Riaz as Akash
- Shabnur as Sagorika
- Amin Khan as Raju
- Keya as Mitali
- Wasimul Bari Rajib as Raihan Chowdhury
- Anwara as Raju's mother
- Dulari Chakraborty as Akash's step mother
- Mafia as Akash's step brother
- Kabila as Kallu
- Rathindranath Roy as himself, performing the song Bodhu Bese Konya
- Momtaz as herself, performing the song Bodhu Bese Konya

== Music ==
The film's music was directed by Shawkat Ali Imon. Lyrics by Kabir Bokul also singers are Monir Khan, Asif, Moutushi, Andru kishore, Momtaz and Rabindranath Roy. The original music in Hindi was composed by Nadeem-Shravan.

=== Soundtrack ===
Hridoyer Bandhon

Soundtrack album by Shawkat Ali Imon
- Released: 2001 (Bangladesh)
- Recorded: 2001
- Producer: ANUPAM

Track	Titles	Singers	Notes
1	Tumi Amar Bhalobasa (duet)	Syed Abdul Hadi and Kanak Chapa	
2	Bodhu Base Konya	Momotaj and Rathindranath Roy	
3	E Monta Bolachhe Amake (version 2)	Monir Khan, Syed Abdul Hadi and Kanak Chapa	
4	Na Na Na Korbona Prem	Asif and Kanak Chapa	
5	Premeri Khelate Keu Hare	Moushumi	
6	E Monta Bolachhe Amake (version 1)	Asif and Konok Chapa	
7	Tumi Amar Bhalobasha (male)	Andrew Kishore	

== Box office ==
Hridoyer Bandhon film released was 2001 in an Eid and gets a great popularity of the all categories film viewers in Bangladesh.
