= Buker Moddhye Agun =

Bangladeshi drama streaming television series

- Screenplay by: Nazim Ud Daula
- Story by: Javed Khan Rumi
- Directed by: Taneem Rahman Angshu
- Starring: Ziaul Faruq Apurba; Yash Rohan
- Country of origin: Bangladesh
- Original language: Bengali
- No. of seasons: 1
- No. of episodes: 8

Production
- Producer: Shahriar Shakil
- Production company: Alpha-i Studios Limited

Original release
- Network: Hoichoi
- Release: 2 March 2023

Buker Moddhye Agun (lit. 'Fire in the chest') is a mystery thriller web series directed by Taneem Rahman Angshu, started streaming on the Bengali OTT platform Hoichoi on 2 March 2023. Based on Bangladesh, the series features Ziaul Faruq Apurba and Yash Rohan in the lead roles. It is the debut web series of Apurba.

== Premise ==
Bangladesh's once popular film actor Arman Rahman committed suicide in 2002. Then in 2022, a video went viral online which made Arman remember the countrymen and demanded an investigation into Arman's death. Bangladesh Police assign SP Golam Mamun to investigate Arman's death. Coincidentally, Golam Mamun was a devoted fan of Arman Rahman.

== Cast and characters ==
- Ziaul Faruq Apurba as ASP Golam Mamun
- Yash Rohan as Arman Rahman Joy
- Abu Hurayra Tanvir as Banna
- Toma Mirza as Sabina
- Shahnaz Sumi as Shabnam
- Tania Ahmed
- Tauquir Ahmed as Shafqat Reza
- Tariq Anam Khan as Khaled Shikder
- Gazi Rakayet
- Sushoma Sarkar
- Irin Afrose as Shefali

== Episodes ==
Series	Episodes	Originally released
1	8	2 March 2023

=== Series 1 ===
No. overall	Episode	Directed by	Written by	Original release date
1	Phire Ashar Golpo	Taneem Rahman Angshu	Javed Khan Rumi	2 March 2023
2	Bondhu Naki Shatru	Taneem Rahman Angshu	Javed Khan Rumi	2 March 2023
3	Chena Jawkhon Ochena	Taneem Rahman Angshu	Javed Khan Rumi	2 March 2023
4	Sneher Chhalona	Taneem Rahman Angshu	Javed Khan Rumi	2 March 2023
5	Utthan-Poton	Taneem Rahman Angshu	Javed Khan Rumi	2 March 2023
6	Pranoyer Palabodol	Taneem Rahman Angshu	Javed Khan Rumi	2 March 2023
7	Potoner Prostuti	Taneem Rahman Angshu	Javed Khan Rumi	2 March 2023
8	Hotya Naki Atmyahotya	Taneem Rahman Angshu	Javed Khan Rumi	2 March 2023

== Release and Controversies ==
It was produced in 2022. On 19 January 2023, Hoichoi officially announced that the web series would be released that year. They scheduled the web series to release in February. It was said that its plot revolved around the mysterious death of a famous fictitious film male actor. Jugantar claimed in their report that the web series was produced on the death of Salman Shah. As proof, the report cites that it is named after the Salman Shah starrer film "Buker Bhitor Agun". Director Taneem Rahman Angshu said to Channel i that he wants to release it on the Valentine's Day. He also said that the web series he directed is not based on any true story. Maybe its story can be a little similar to the death of Salman Shah. In 5 February, Salman Shah's family sent a legal notice to the director as the web series was announced to be released amid the ongoing lawsuit over Salman Shah's death. According to Neela Chowdhury, mother of Salman Shah, Salman Shah's family has been dishonored through the web series. The web series was scheduled to release on 17 February, but the Bangladesh branch of Hoichoi postponed the release showing some pending production task. Then on 2 March, without any official announcement, Hoichoi made the web series available for viewing on their network. Its plot and misrepresentation of the Bangladesh Police have drawn criticism from several police officers on social media.

== Reception ==
The web series received mixed response upon its release, but it received praise from the audience for Apurba's performance. Poorna Banerjee of The Times of India writes that Buker Moddhye Agun is entertaining to watch, but it could be a better show if it could overcome poor acting of actors, especially Yash Roshan. Hafiz Mollah of Newsbangla24.com wrote, "The eventful life of Hero Salman Shah, the surrounding conditions - everything is there. The hero's popularity, loneliness, wants; in general, a diary of his life is revealed through it." Wroted by Prothom Alo's survey as "Apurba won praise for playing the role of a police officer named Golam Mamun in 'Bukker Madh Agun'".

== Spin-off ==
A 8 episode spin off series of Buker moddhey agun is released named Golam Mamun on Hoichoi on 13-06-2024 Thursday.
