= 30th Bangladesh National Film Awards =

National Film Awards, Bangladesh

- Awarded for: Best of Bangladeshi cinema in 2005
- Awarded by: President of Bangladesh
- Presented by: Ministry of Information
- Presented on: October 23, 2008
- Site: Bangladesh-China Friendship Conference Centre, Dhaka, Bangladesh
- Hosted by: Alamgir and Farzana Brownia
- Official website: moi.gov.bd

Highlights
- Best Feature Film: Hajar Bachhor Dhore
- Best Actor: Mahfuz Ahmed; Laal Sobuj
- Best Actress: Shabnur; Dui Noyoner Alo
- Most awards: Hajar Bachhor Dhore (6)

The 30th National Film Awards were presented by the Ministry of Information, Bangladesh, to felicitate the best of Bangladeshi cinema released in the year 2005. The Bangladesh National Film Awards is a film award ceremony in Bangladesh established in 1975 by the government of Bangladesh. Every year, a national panel appointed by the government selects the winning entry, and the award ceremony is held in Dhaka. Chief Adviser Fakhruddin Ahmed presented the awards at the Bangladesh-China Friendship Conference Centre on October 23, 2008.

== List of winners ==
An eleven-member jury board chaired by the additional secretary of the Ministry of Information selected the winners in 13 different categories.

=== Merit awards ===
Name of Awards	Winner(s)	Film
Best Film		Hajar Bachhor Dhore
Best Director	Kohinur Akhter Shuchanda	Hajar Bachhor Dhore
Best Actor	Mahfuz Ahmed	Laal Sobuj
Best Actress	Shabnur	Dui Noyoner Alo
Best Actor in a Supporting Role	Ilias Kanchan	Shasti: The Punishment
Best Actress in a Supporting Role	Champa	Shasti: The Punishment
Best Child Artist	Hridoy Islam	Taka
Best Music Director	Ahmed Imtiaz Bulbul	Hajar Bachhor Dhore
Best Male Playback Singer	Monir Khan	Dui Noyoner Alo
Best Female Playback Singer	Sabina Yasmin	Dui Noyoner Alo
Best Story	Zahir Raihan (Posthumous)	Hajar Bachhor Dhore
Best Cinematography	Mahfuzur Rahman Khan	Hajar Bachhor Dhore
Best Art Director	Mohammad Kalantar	Hajar Bachhor Dhore

== See also ==
- Bachsas Film Awards
- Meril Prothom Alo Awards
- Ifad Film Club Award
- Babisas Award
