= Sujon Sokhi (1994 film) =

1994 Bangladeshi film

- Poster
- Directed by: Shah Alom Kiron
- Story by: Khan Ataur Rahman
- Produced by: Nazmul Hossain
- Starring: Salman Shah; Shabnur; Raisul Islam Asad; Sadek Bacchu; Anwara Begum
- Cinematography: M. R. Jahangir
- Edited by: Mujibur Rahman Dulu
- Music by: Abu Taher
- Production company: Fear Films
- Release date: August 12, 1994
- Country: Bangladesh
- Language: Bengali

Sujan Sakhi is a 1994 Bangladeshi film which was directed by Shah Alom Kiron, starring Salman Shah and Shabnur. It is a remake of the 1975 movie of the same name. as a box-office hit.

== Plot ==
Lokhman, his wife and their son Sujan live with his stepmother, stepbrother Solaiman and Solaiman's pregnant wife, whom Lokhman and his wife detest. However, the stepfamily regards them as their own, and his stepmother and Solaiman love Sujan very much. Later, Lokhman and his wife throw them out of the house, after which Solaiman gives his share of the family wealth to Sujan. Solaiman and his family start a new life, but his wife dies after giving birth to their daughter, Sakhi, breaking his heart in the process. Years later, Sujan and Sakhi fell in love and vowed to reunite their family. Lokhman and his wife are not happy about this, and Solaiman and his mother try to break them up by locking them in their house. Sujan and Sakhi then try to elope. Solaiman saves them from being hit by a train, for which Lokhman is very grateful, and the feud ends. Lokhman brings them to his house, where his wife eventually apologises to Solaiman's mother. Sujan and Sakhi got married, and everyone lived happily ever after.

== Cast ==
- Salman Shah as Sujon
  - Mithu as young Sujon
- Shabnur as Sokhi
- Raisul Islam Asad as Solaiman, Sokhi's father
- Anwara Begum as Solaiman's mother
- Sadek Bachchu as Lokman, Sujon's father
- Rina Khan as Sujon's mother
- Sharmin as Solaiman's wife
- Akhi as Kusum
- Ninad
- Shamsuddin Kayes
- Siraj Haider
- Syed Akhter Ali
- Zamilur Rahman Saka
- Sanowar Morshed
- Amir Hossain Babu

== Soundtrack ==
All music were composed by Abu Taher and lyrics were penned by Khan Ataur Rahman.

No.	Title	Playback Singer(s)	Length
1.	"Agun Jolere"	Nilufar Yasmin
2.	"Gun Guna Gun Gan Gahiya"	Sabina Yasmin
3.	"Gachher Bel Pakile"	Rathindranath Roy
4.	"Shob Sokhire Paar Korite"	Andrew Kishore and Sabina Yasmin
