= Moniruzzaman Monir =

Bangladeshi music composer

- মনিরুজ্জামান মনির
- Born: January 28, 1952 (age 74); Sunamganj, Sylhet Division, East Bengal
- Occupation: Lyricist
- Years active: 1975 present

Moniruzzaman Monir is a Bangladeshi music lyricists. He won Bangladesh National Film Award for Best Lyrics three times in 1988, 1989 and 1990. He was awarded Ekushey Padak in 2004 by the Government of Bangladesh. He has written songs for 196 films.

== Career ==
He made his debut with Abhagi in 1975. He teamed up with Shakib Khan in Abu Sayeed Khan's romance drama Dujon Dujonar in 1999.

== Personal life ==
Monir is married to Fatema Monir.

== Discography ==
=== Filmography ===
- Abhagi (1975)
- Bondini (1976)
- Golapi Ekhon Traine (1978)
- Nagordola (1979)
- Noder Chand (1979)
- Juboraj (1980)
- Nag Purnima (1980)
- Jibon Nouka (1981)
- Kolmilota (1981)
- Lal Sabujer Pala (1981)
- Rajar Raja (1982)
- Alta Banu (1982)
- Dokhol (1982)
- Reshmi Churi (1982)
- Saudagor (1982)
- Shanai (1982)
- Asha (1983)
- Challenge (1983)
- Ferari Basanta (1983)
- Megh Bijli Badol (1983)
- Pransojoni (1983)
- Bongshodhor (1984)
- Lal Mem Saheb (1984)
- Nosib (1984)
- Princess Tina Khan (1984)
- Shorif Bodmash (1984)
- Shorojontro (1984)
- Mohanayok (1985)
- Phuleshwari (1985)
- Premik (1985)
- Shomsher (1985)
- Teen Konya (1985)
- Ashanti (1986)
- Khamosh (1986)
- Loraku (1986)
- Martial Hero (1986)
- Rastar Raja (1986)
- Sohel Rana (1986)
- Harano Sur (1987)
- Humki (1987)
- Lalu Mastan (1987)
- Morjada (1987)
- Poddo Gokhra (1987)
- Shotota (1987)
- Adil (1988)
- Biswas Abiswas (1988)
- Dui Jibon (1988)
- Sukher Shopno (1988)
- Ami Ee Shahenshah (1989)
- Bhaijaan (1989)
- Bheja Chokh (1989)
- Bir Bikrom (1989)
- Birpurush (1989)
- Bisforon (1989)
- Bojromushti (1989)
- Boner Moto Bon (1989)
- Durnam (1989)
- Master Samurai (1989)
- Okorma (1989)
- Raja Johnny (1989)
- Shotto Mittha (1989)
- Sonar Songsar (1989)
- Sonar Nao Poboner Boitha (1989)
- Amar Songi (1990)
- Apon Ghor (1990)
- Asman Jomin (1990)
- Biplob (1990)
- Dolna (1990)
- Ghor Amar Ghor (1990)
- Koifiyot (1990)
- Kusum Koli (1990)
- Maiyar Naam Moyna (1990)
- Baap Beta 420 (1991)
- Badshah Bhai (1991)
- Danga (1991)
- Ochena (1991)
- Satya Mithya (1991)
- Shantona (1991)
- Sontrash (1991)
- Top Rongbaz (1991)
- Ajker Hungama (1992)
- Chorer Bou (1992)
- Dongshon (1992)
- Ghor Bhanga Ghor (1992)
- Jeler Meye Roshni (1992)
- Kkhoma (1992)
- Matir Kosom (1992)
- Somporko (1992)
- Tyaag (1992)
- Utthan Poton (1992)
- Anutopto (1993)
- Banglar Bodhu (1993)
- Bhoyongkor Saat Din (1993)
- Keyamat Theke Keyamat (1993)
- Stree Hotta (1993)
- Don (1994)
- Ghrina (1994)
- Ontore Ontore (1994)
- Shot Manush (1994)
- Stree Hotya (1994)
- Tumi Amar (1994)
- Asha Bhalobasha (1995)
- Denmohor (1995)
- Dost Amar Dushmon (1995)
- Ghor Duar (1995)
- Hridoy Amar (1995)
- Hingsar Agun (1995)
- Mohamilon (1995)
- Papi Shotru (1995)
- Shesh Rokkha (1995)
- 'Shilpi (1995)
- Shopner Thikana (1995)
- Akheri Mokabela (1996)
- Bodsurot (1996)
- Ghat Protighat (1996)
- Goriber Ostad (1996)
- Kholnayok (1996)
- Malamal (1996)
- Mayer Adhikar (1996)
- Morjadar Lorai (1996)
- Pransojoni (1996)
- Shoytan Manush (1996)
- Sneher Protidan (1996)
- Abdullah (1997)
- Chiroshotru (1997)
- Coolie (1997)
- Ekjon Bidrohi (1997)
- Fasi (1997)
- Hridoyer Ayna (1997)
- Khoma Nei (1997)
- Mohan Bondhu (1997)
- Prem Piyasi (1997)
- Shudhu Tumi (1997) as Lyricist
- Songsarer Sukh Dukkho (1997)
- Bhalobashar Ghor (1998)
- Buk Bhora Bhalobasha (1998)
- Ei Mon Tomake Dilam (1998)
- Ghater Majhi (1998)
- Mayer Kosom (1998)
- Mrityur Mukhe (1998)
- Shesh Protikkha (1998)
- Ajker Dapot (1999)
- Ashami Bondhu (1999)
- Dirdanto Dapot (1999)
- Jibon Chabi (1999)
- Laal Badshah (1999)
- Lonkakando (1999)
- Pagla Ghonta (1999)
- Parle Thekao (1999)
- Rani Keno Dakaat (1999)
- Spordha (1999)
- Dujon Dujonar (2000)
- Ei Mon Chay Je (2000)
- Karishma (2000)
- Premer Naam Bedona (2000)
- Shesh Thikana (2000)
- Teji Sontan (2000)
- Borsha Badol (2001)
- Nisshashe Tumi Bisshashe Tumi (2001)
- Raj Golam (2001)
- Thekao Mastan (2001)
- Alibaba (2002)
- Boba Khuni (2002)
- Bou Hobo (2002)
- Matir Moyna (2002)
- Oder Dohor (2002)
- Antore Jhor (2003)
- Bou Shashurir Juddho (2003)
- Karagar (2003)
- Matir Phul (2003)
- Praner Manush (2003)
- Bagher Bachcha (2004)
- Tyag (2004)
- Heera Amar Naam (2005)
- Torture (2006)
- Swamir Sangsar (2007)
- Mone Prane Achho Tumi (2008)
- Amar Praner Priya (2009)
- Shaheb Name Golam (2009)
- Banglar King Kong (2010)
- Bhalobaslei Ghor Bandha Jay Na (2010)
- Bolona Tumi Amar (2010)
- Ek Takar Kabin (2011)
- Ek Takar Denmohor (2011)
- Moner Jala (2011)
- Tor Karone Beche Achhi (2011)
- My Name Is Sultan (2012)
- Premik Number One (2013)
- Bou Shashuri
- Dilruba
- Hero Number One
- Tumi Je Amar
- Atonko
- Durdanto Dapot
- Shotrur Mokabela

== Awards ==
- Ekushey Padak (2004)
- Bangladesh National Film Award for Best Lyrics (1990)
- Bangladesh National Film Award for Best Lyrics (1989)
- Bangladesh National Film Award for Best Lyrics (1988)
