= Buker Bhitor Agun =

1997 Bangladeshi film

- Film poster
- Directed by: Chatku Ahmed
- Written by: Chatku Ahmed
- Screenplay by: Chatku Ahmed
- Story by: Chatku Ahmed
- Produced by: Tanju and Sheta
- Starring: Salman Shah; Shabnur; Ferdous Ahmed; Wasimul Bari Rajib; Misha Sawdagor; Don
- Cinematography: Shohidullah Dulal
- Edited by: Munir Hossain Abul
- Music by: Nur Mannan
- Production company: M M Movies
- Release date: 5 September 1997
- Running time: 138 minutes
- Country: Bangladesh
- Language: Bengali

Buker Bhitor Agun is a 1997 Bangladeshi film, directed by Chatku Ahmed, and produced by Tanju and Sheta, under the banner of M M Movies. It stars Salman Shah, Shahnur, Ferdous Ahmed, Wasimul Bari Rajib, Misha Sawdagor, Don and others. Its debut film of Ferdous Ahmed and last film of Salman Shah.

== Cast ==
- Salman Shah - Agun
- Shabnur - Ishita
- Ferdous Ahmed - Agun
- Rishita
- Wasimul Bari Rajib
- Misha Sawdagor
- Don
- Taimor Long
- Kangalini Sufia
- Alka Sarker
- Rashed Chowdhury
- A K Qureshi
- Sanowar Morshed
- Azadi Hasnat Firoj
- Jamilur Rahman Shakha
- Syed Akhter Ali
- Syed Hasan Imam
- Raisul Islam Asad
- Falguni Hamid
- Anwar Hossain

== Production ==
Salman could not complete this film, which was completed by the makers with the help of other actors and puppeteers. Though shadow characters appeared in some scenes, Salman was also present. Salman earned two lakh taka for this film.

== Reception and release ==
bdnews24 wrote that "The film has received positive reviews from audience and critics".

The Daily Ittefaq wrote that "After his (Salman Shah) death, the film that followed were widely appreciated by the audience and commercially successful".

Bhorer Kagoj wrote that "This movie also one of his all commercial box office success movies".

Somoy TV has also listed the movie Buker Bhitor Agun among the hit movies starring by Salman Shah.

Jagonews24 wrote that "Salman Shah-Shabnur is considered the most successful romantic pair in Dhaka cinema. Salman-Shabnur duo acted in these 13 films. All the films were superhits" one was this film, which are Salman-Shabnur duo acted film.

This film was released on 5 September 1997.

== Legacy ==
According to Channel 24, Bangla Tribune, Channel i news published wrotes thats "Salman Shah's maternal uncle Alamgir Kumkum has filed a GD with the police station seeking a halt to the production of the web series 'Buker Moddhye Agun', created by Taneem Rahman Angshu, due to the uproar on the Indian OTT platform over the mystery of his death. The GD states, "My nephew Salman Shah was found dead in his house. The case regarding the mystery of his death is still ongoing. In the meantime, Tanim Rahman is producing a web series 'Buker Moddhye Agun' for the Indian OTT platform Hoichoi, which is being promoted on various media including social media." The GD further states, "Since the case regarding the mysterious death of Salman Shah is ongoing, I have sent a legal notice to make such a web series. His mysterious death is being promoted as a suicide by a group to divert attention."
