= Shoshurbari Zindabad =

Bangladeshi film

- Directed by: Debashish Biswas
- Written by: Dilip Biswas
- Produced by: Gayotry Biswas
- Starring: Riaz; Shabnur; Sonia; Rahul; Sajon; Bulbul Ahmed; Rina Khan; Prabir Mitra; Dolly Johur; Misha Sawdagor; ATM Shamsuzzaman
- Cinematography: Abul Khayer
- Edited by: Aminurl Islam Mintu
- Music by: Emon Saha
- Distributed by: Geti Kothachitra
- Release date: 2002
- Running time: 147 Minutes
- Country: Bangladesh
- Language: Bengali

Shoshurbari Zindabad (transl. Long live the father-in-law's house) (Bengali: শ্বশুরবাড়ী জিন্দাবাদ) is a 2002 Bangladeshi film released on Eid-ul-Fitr. It is a remake of the 2000 Indian Bengali film Sasurbari Zindabad which itself is a remake of the 1989 Telugu film Attaku Yamudu Ammayiki Mogudu. The film marked the directorial debut of Debashish Biswas, son of Dilip Biswas.

== Plot ==
Badhon vows revenge against his aunt Dilruba Chowdhury, who falsely accused his widowed mother Rehana Akhter of being a thief and threw them out of her house to steal her winning lottery ticket and live a wealthy life.

== Cast ==
- Riaz - Badhon
- Shabnur - Prema Chodhury, Badhon's cousin and wife
- Sonia - Ria Chowdhury, Prema's sister and Badhon's cousin
- Rahul - Sajal
- Sajon - Rafi
- Bulbul Ahmed - Arman Chowdhury, Prema and Ria's father
- Rina Khan - Dilruba Chowdhury, Prema and Ria's mother
- Prabir Mitra - Rajib Khondokar
- Dolly Johur - Rehana Akter, Badhon's mother
- Misha Sawdagor - Badhon's friends
- ATM Shamsuzzaman - Hekmi (Hekmat Ali Munshi)
- Afzal Sharif - Tota
- Amol Bose - Mr. Mojumdar

== Music ==
The music for the film was composed by Gazi Mazharul Anwar and directed by Emon Saha.

=== Song list ===
Track	Song	Singer	Notes	Screen
1	Amar Bhalobashar Gari Chalu Holo	Andrew Kishore		Riaz
2	Ami Chilam Eka Eka Tomar Sathe Holo Dekha	Udit Narayan and Sanjeevani		Riaz and Shabnur
3	Tomar Amar Biyer Kotha Rakhbona Gopon	Andrew Kishore ও Samina Chowdhury	Title song	Riaz and Shabnur
৪	Soshur Bari Aisa Amar Asha Furaise	Monir Khan	Mixed Music	Riaz
