= Forever Flows =

2006 Bangladeshi film

Nirontor
- Directed by: Abu Sayeed
- Written by: Humayun Ahmed
- Produced by: Impress Telefilm Limited
- Starring: Shabnur; Ilias Kanchan; Jayanta Chattopadhyay; Dolly Johur; Litu Anam; Amirul Huq Chowdhury
- Cinematography: Mazibul Huq Bhuiyan
- Edited by: Junaid Halim
- Music by: S I Tutul
- Release date: 2006
- Running time: 95 minutes
- Country: Bangladesh
- Language: Bengali

Nirontor (in English as Forever Flows) is a 2006 Bangladeshi drama film directed by Abu Sayeed. It stars Shabnoor, Ilias Kanchan, Jayanta Chattopadhyay, Dolly Johur, Litu Anam, and Amirul Haq Chowdhury. It was Bangladesh's submission to the 79th Academy Awards for the Academy Award for Best Foreign Language Film, but was not accepted as a nominee.

== Plot ==
The film portrays the struggle of Tithi, a young girl from a lower-middle-class family. Tithi takes up the job of a call girl to support her family. With time, the economic condition of the family changes, but slowly Tithi becomes very much aloof and indifferent to everything. She takes refuge in solitude.

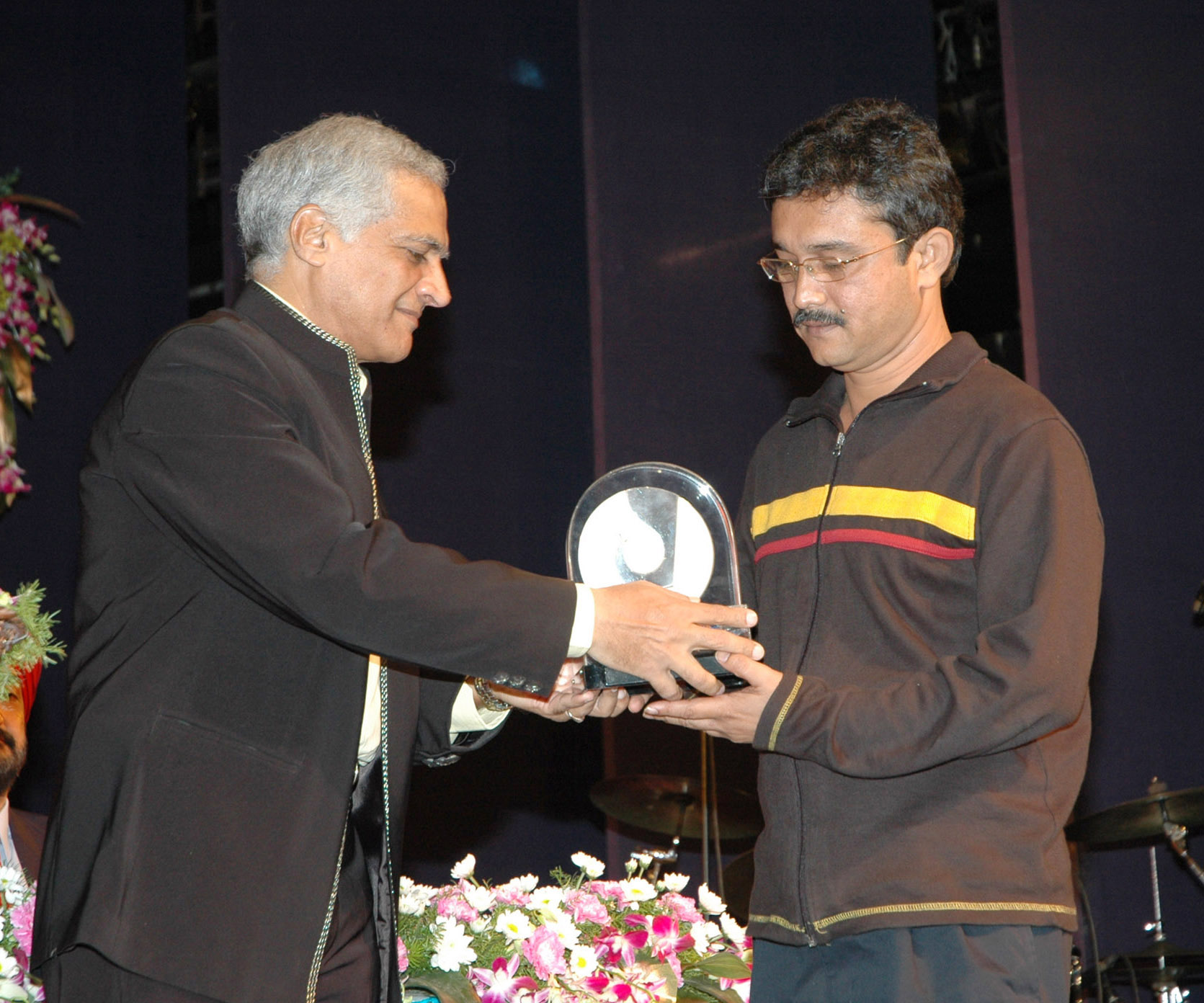
Director Abu Sayeed receiving Silver Peacock (Special Jury Award) for the film at IFFI (2006)

== Cast ==
- Shabnur as Tithi
- Ilias Kanchan as Dabir, a client of Tithi
- Jayanta Chattopadhyay
- Dolly Johur as Minu, Tithi's mother
- Litu Anam
- Amirul Huq Chowdhury as Jalaluddin, Tithi's father
- Shilpi Sharkar Apu as Farida, Dabir's wife

== Awards ==
- Special Jury Award, International Film Festival of India, Goa, 2006
- Best Film, International Film Festival Kerala, 2006
- Best Film by FIPRESCI, International Film Festival of Kerala, 2006
- Bangladesh Submission for OSCAR, 2006

== See also ==
- Cinema of Bangladesh
- List of submissions to the 79th Academy Awards for Best Foreign Language Film
