= Danga =

Bangladeshi action drama film

- Danga movie poster
- Directed by: Kazi Hayat
- Written by: Kazi Hayat
- Produced by: Helen Mostafiz
- Starring: Manna; Suchorita; Wasimul Bari Rajib; Anowara; Mizu Ahmed
- Cinematography: Azmal Hoque
- Edited by: Mohammad Ali; Shahid
- Music by: Ahmed Imtiaz Bulbul
- Production company: Moushumi Kothachitra
- Distributed by: Moushumi Kothachitra
- Release date: 1991
- Running time: 140 min
- Country: Bangladesh
- Language: Bengali

Danga (transl. riot) (Bengali: দাঙ্গা) is a Bangladeshi Bengali-language action drama film written and directed by Kazi Hayat. It stars Manna, Suchorita, Wasimul Bari Rajib, Anowara and Mizu Ahmed in lead roles. The film was released in 1991.

Danga film won two National Film Awards. Wasimul Bari Rajib won the Best Supporting Actor Awards and popular Singer Sabina Yasmin won Best Female Singer Awards for song "Hey Matribhumi".

== Plot ==
Begunbari is a small town where Abul Hossain is an influential parliament member who embezzles all the relief goods with the help of local chairman. Chhobi is a lower middle class young woman who goes to get relief goods. Chairman's evil eye fell on her and VP of local college Habib saves her. As a result, he gets murdered. OC Raju comes to the town to investigate the murder and reveals the actual culprit behind this.

== Cast ==
- Manna as OC Raju
- Suchorita as Chhobi
- Wasimul Bari Rajib as Kalu Miah
- Mizu Ahmed as MP Abul Hossain
- Anowara as Amena Begum
- Dildar as SI Abdur Rahman
- Siraj Haider as Advocate 2
- Kabila as Kalu's Gung
- Kazi Maruf as Maruf
- Shapna as Shapna
- Azharul Islam Khan as Police Commissioner

== Music ==
The soundtrack of the film Danga was composed by Ahmed Imtiaz Bulbul, with lyrics by Ahmed Imtiaz Bulbul and Mohammad Rafikuzzaman. Playback singers for the songs included Andrew Kishore, Runa Laila, Baby Naznin, Rabindra Nath Roy, Shakila Zafar, and Sabina Yasmin.

Notable songs from the film include:

- "He Matribhumi" – sung by Sabina Yasmin
- "Ami Ek Jhora Koli" – sung by Sabina Yasmin
- "Je Jon Premer Bhab Jane Na" – sung by Runa Laila

== Award and achievements ==
The film won two National Film Awards:

- Winner Best Actor in a Supporting Role, Wasimul Bari Rajib
- Winner Best Female Playback Singer, Sabina Yasmin
