= Moner Moto Mon =

Indo-Bangladesh romantic drama film

- Poster
- Directed by: Montazur Rahman Akbar
- Screenplay by: Abdullah Zahir Babu
- Story by: Abdullah Zahir Babu
- Produced by: Adnan Rashid Dhali "Boni" & Fazlur Rashid Dhali (Bangladesh); Amya Patnaik (India)
- Starring: Amin Khan; Mohini; Victor Banerjee
- Cinematography: Amjad Hossain (Bangladesh); Ashok Sharma (India)
- Edited by: Lal Mohammad
- Music by: Pranab Ghosh
- Production companies: Boni Pictures (Bangladesh); RMB & D Production (co-produced from Bangladesh); Shudha Raj Arts (co-produced from India); AP Production (co-produced from India)
- Distributed by: Boni Pictures (Bangladesh); Shudha Raj Arts (India)
- Release date: 6 November 1998
- Countries: Bangladesh; India
- Languages: Bengali; Odia

Moner Moto Mon is a 1998 Indo-Bangladesh joint production romantic drama film. Directed by Montazur Rahman Akbar. The film producer by Adnan Rashid Dhali "Boni" and Fazlur Rashid Dhali under the banner of Boni Pictures from Bangladesh and Dilip Kankaria and Amyo Patnaik under the banner of AP Production. The music score of the film was composed by Pranab Ghosh. The film stars actors and actresses from both countries, including Amin Khan, Mohini, Victor Banerjee, Suruj Bangali and Kamal. The film was also released in the Indian state of Odisha as Raja Rani in the Odia-language.

== Story ==
Victor Banerjee is a wealthy man and Rani is his daughter. Rani went for a picnic with her friends in her free time and met the king who belongs to a poor family. During the picnic both the king and the queen got lost in a forest. They encountered a lot of criminals living in the forest. There they fell in love and later the king's father came to know that the king was in love. The king's father took the king's marriage proposal to the queen's father.

== Cast ==
- Amin Khan as Raja
- Mohini as Rani
- Victor Banerjee as Rani's father
- Uttam Mohanty as Raja's father
- Suruj Bangali
