= Ghani (2006 film) =

Bangladeshi film

- Posters
- Directed by: Kazi Morshed
- Written by: Kazi Morshed
- Screenplay by: Hasan Ahmed
- Produced by: Impress Telefilm Limited
- Starring: Raisul Islam Asad; Masum Aziz; Arman Parvez Murad; Naznin Hasan Chumki; Dolly Johur
- Edited by: Saiful Islam
- Music by: Sheikh Sadi Khan
- Distributed by: Impress Telefilm Limited
- Release date: 2006
- Running time: 109 minutes
- Country: Bangladesh
- Language: Bengali

Ghani (Bengali: ঘানি) or The Cycle is a 2006 Bangladeshi film directed by Kazi Morshed. The film won National Film Awards in 11 categories.

== Plot ==
Afsu and Shamsu are brothers living under the rule of a local landlord. Afsu leaves the business of bullock driven oil mill due to his old age complications but Shamsu continues it due to poverty. Shamsu along with his son Bozlu engage in their forefathers' traditional business in full swing.

In the meantime, Bozlu marries Moyna. Their lives start revolving around the Ghaani (oil mill). One night, the bullock gets stolen from their house by some thieves. They now use Moyna to spin the treadle.

== Cast ==
- Masum Aziz as Afsu
- Raisul Islam Asad as Shamsu
- Arman Parvez Murad as Bozlu
- Naznin Hasan Chumki as Moyna
- Dolly Johur as Rokeya

== Soundtrack ==
The music of this film was directed by Sheikh Sadi Khan.

== Awards ==
| Award Title | Category | Awardee | Result |
|---|---|---|---|
| National Film Awards | Best Film | Kazi Morshed (Producer) | Won |
| National Film Awards | Best Director | Kazi Morshed | Won |
| National Film Awards | Best Actor | Arman Parvez Murad | Won |
| National Film Awards | Best Actress | Naznin Hasan Chumki | Won |
| National Film Awards | Best Actor in a Supporting Role | Masum Aziz and Raisul Islam Asad | Won |
| National Film Awards | Best Actress in a Supporting Role | Dolly Zahur | Won |
| National Film Awards | Best Music Director | Sheikh Saadi Khan | Won |
| National Film Awards | Best Story | Kazi Morshed | Won |
| National Film Awards | Best Dialogue | Kazi Morshed | Won |
| National Film Awards | Best Screenplay | Kazi Morshed | Won |
| National Film Awards | Best Cameraman | Hasan Ahmed | Won |
| National Film Awards | Best Editing | Raisul Islam Asad | Won |
