= Shanto Keno Mastan =

1998 film by Montazur Rahman Akbar

- Movie poster
- শান্ত কেন মাস্তান
- Directed by: Montazur Rahman Akbar
- Screenplay by: Montazur Rahman Akbar
- Story by: Abdullah Zahir Babu
- Produced by: Arman Production
- Starring: Manna; Shahnaz; Humayun Faridi
- Edited by: Amzad Hossain
- Music by: Pranab Ghosh; Kabir Bakul (lyrics)
- Release date: 31 July 1998
- Country: Bangladesh
- Budget: ৳0.90 crore (equivalent to ৳4.7 crore or US$390,000 in 2024)
- Box office: ৳10.50 crore (equivalent to ৳55 crore or US$4.5 million in 2024)

Shanto Keno Mastan is a 1998 Bangladeshi action crime film. The main role of the film is played by Manna. The film was a remake of the 1997 Bollywood film Ziddi which was remade in Tamil as Dharma (1998) and an unofficial adaptation in Kannada as One Man Army (1998).

== Plot ==
Sadek tries to rape Shanto's younger sister Jui and Shanto in revenge kills Sadek. Shanto's father, lawyer Mirza Sahib is the witness in the case. He hands over his son to the law and Shanto is sentenced to four years in prison. Mirza chases the jailed Shanto from the house and Shanto then chose the gangster's path.

== Cast ==
- Manna as Shanto
- Shahnaz as Bonna
- Misha Sawdagor as Mojid
- Humayun Faridi as Zafur
- Dildar
- Siraj Haider
- Dolly Johur
- Abdur Razzak
- Kabila as Mr. Lal
- Nargis Akter Marjina

== Music ==
Shanto Keno Mastan

Soundtrack album by Pranab Ghosh
- Released: 1998 (Bangladesh)
- Recorded: 1998
- Genre: Soundtrack/Filmi
- Producer: Agniveena

=== Soundtrack ===
Track	Title	Singers
1	Tomake Bhalobeshe Hashi Mukhe	Ayub Bachchu and Kanak Chapa
2	Lal Lal Dui Thot Diya	Polash
3	Ami Je Sundori Ange Agun	Rizia Parvin
4	Tumi Chhuye Dile	Polash and Rizia Parvin
5	Jiboner Cheye Tumi Anek Beshi Dami	Khalid Hasan Milu and Dolly Sayontoni
