= Dui Noyoner Alo =

Bangladeshi romantic drama film

- Movie poster
- Directed by: Mostafizur Rahman Manik
- Story by: Mostafizur Rahman Manik
- Produced by: Humayun Kabir
- Starring: Shabnur; Ferdous Ahmed; Shakil Khan; Bulbul Ahmed
- Edited by: Touhid Hossain Chowdhury
- Music by: Ahmed Imtiaz Bulbul
- Production company: New Genre Films
- Release date: 13 May 2005
- Country: Bangladesh
- Language: Bengali

Dui Noyoner Alo is a 2005 Bangladeshi romantic drama film directed by Mostafizur Rahman Manik. The film was produced by Humayun Kabir under the banner of Navdhara Films. It stars Shabnur, Ferdous Ahmed, Shakil Khan and Bulbul Ahmed. It revolves around the life struggle of a low-income young woman and her struggle for dignity. The film was released on May 13, 2005. Shabnur won the Bangladesh National Film Award for Best Actress for her performance in it. The film also won two more awards in the music category.

== Cast ==
- Shabnur - Sejuti
- Ferdous Ahmed - Akash
- Prabir Mitra - Sejuti's father

== Soundtrack ==
All lyrics are written by Ahmed Imtiaz Bulbul; all music is composed by Ahmed Imtiaz Bulbul.

| No. | Title | singer (s) | Length |
|---|---|---|---|
| 1. | "Amar Gram Amar Thikana" | Baby Nazneen |
| 2. | "Dui Noyoner Alo" | Monir Khan |
| 3. | "O Pori" | Kumar Biswajit |
| 4. | "Purnimar Chand Nou" | Sabina Yasmin And Andrew Kishore |
| 5. | "Sukher Pakhi Re" | Sabina Yasmin |
| 6. | "Bodhuare Bujhona Keu Bhul" | Subir Nandi |

== Awards and nominations ==
| Award | Category | Nominated | Results | Source |
|---|---|---|---|---|
| 30th Bangladesh National Film Awards | Bangladesh National Film Award for Best Actress | Shabnur | Won | |
| 30th Bangladesh National Film Awards | Bangladesh National Film Award for Best Male Playback Singer | Monir Khan | Won | |
| 30th Bangladesh National Film Awards | Bangladesh National Film Award for Best Female Playback Singer | Sabina Yasmin | Won | |
| Meril Prothom Alo Awards | Best Actress (critics) | Shabnur | Nominated | |
