= Salman Shah =

Salman Shah may refer to:

- Salman Shah (economist), Pakistani economist and finance minister
- Salman Shah (actor) (1971–1996), Bangladeshi film actor
