= Wasimul Bari Rajib =

Bangladeshi actor (1952-2004)

- ওয়াসিমুল বারী রাজীব
- Born: 1 January 1952
- Died: 14 November 2004 (aged 52); Dhaka, Bangladesh
- Occupations: Actor, producer
- Years active: 1979-2004
- Political party: Bangladesh Nationalist Party
- Spouse: Debi (m. 1985)
- Awards: Bangladesh National Film Awards

Wasimul Bari Rajib (known as Rajib; 1 January 1952 – 14 November 2004) was a Bangladeshi actor. He served as the managing director of the Bangladesh Film Development Corporation (FDC). He acted in more than 400 films. He won Bangladesh National Film Award for Best Supporting Actor four times for his roles in Heeramati (1988), Danga (1991), Bidroho Charidike (2000) and Sahoshi Manush Chai (2003). In 1979, Rajib debuted acting in the film Rakhe Allah Mare Ke. He played as an antagonist in Sohanur Rahman Sohan's romantic drama Ananta Bhalobasha with Shakib Khan, which was his on-screen debut in 1999. He won his fourth Bangladesh National Film Award for Best Supporting Actor for his role in Sahoshi Manush Chai in 2003.

== Career ==
=== Acting ===
Rajib started his film career with the movie Rakhe Allah Mare Ke, he quickly became one of the top villains of the film industry in 1980's. Back to back performance as the main villain in films such as Saheb, Jarka, Sakkhor, Prashchitto, Adorshoban, Strir Paona, Ghor Amar Ghor, Jadu Mahal, Omar Akbar, Benam Badhshah, Rajar Meye Bedni, Adil, Aaoyaz, hathkora, Dayi ke, Danga, Goriber Bou, Sandhan, Oshadaron, shopno, Siddhanto, Bondhon, Prem Lorai, Gorjon, Oshanto Shongshar, Khomotaban, Kung Fu Konna, Chor Dakat Police, Makrosha, Jibon Dhara, Sajano Bagan, Dinkal, Harano Sur, Doya Maya, Nonod Vabi, Bhat Dey, Akorshon, Bishorjon, Dukkho Nei, Beporoa, Jogajog, Adesh, Karate Master, Moha Shotru, Orjon, Dayitto, Rokter Bodla, Bishash Obishash, Salma, Sohrab Rustom, Bidrohi Konna, & Golapi Ekhon Dhakai have given him immense popularity and stardom.

After a decade of his career he continued to portray negative characters in the 1990's with his portrayals in films such Grihobodhu, Hotta, Ajker Humgama, Mirjafor, Chakor, Ainer Haat, Trash, Shesh Khela, Sneher Protidan, Golamir Jinjir, Bojropot, Bikkhov, Moha Milon, Deshedrohi, Khuner Bodla, Luttoraj, Matribhumi, Gunda Police, Attotag, Durdanto Dapot, Vangchur, Lajja, Prem O Protishodh, Baghini Konna, Beimaner Shasti, Kotha Dao, Ma Jokhon Bicharok, Munafek, Kaalpurush, Mukti Chai, & Miss Diana.

However with the success of Keyamat Theke Keyamat, he began to solidify his career and his success as a supporting character started eventually moving away from his original negative characters. Some of the movies that have built his popularity and success as a supporting character include national award winning Bidrohi Charidike, as well as Ontore Ontore, Ziddi, Shesh Rokkha, Prem Piyashi, Bhuker Bhitore Agun, Denmohor, Ashami Greftar, Love, Zid, Shesh Thikana, Shopner Purush, Praner Cheye Priyo, Oporajito Nayok, Meyer Odhikar, Deshdantor, Bhalobashi Tomake, Ananta Bhalobasha, & Vondo.

=== Politics ===
As a politician, Rajib served as the president of JASAS, the cultural wing of Bangladesh Nationalist Party. Rajib was a founding organizational secretary of Jatiotabadi Samajik Sangskritik Sangstha (JASAS), an affiliate of the Bangladesh Nationalist Party (BNP). He later served as the general secretary and continued to hold the position of president until his death.

== Personal life ==
Rajib was adopted by his parents. His first wife was his adopted father's niece whom he had to marry against his will.

Rajib was also married to Ismat Ara Debi. Together they had a son Deep. Debi was his second wife who was 25 years younger than him.

== Death ==
Rajib died from stomach cancer on 14 November 2004, at the age of 52. He was buried at the City Corporation Cemetery in Sector 4 of Uttara, Dhaka.

== Filmography ==
Year	Film	Role	Director	Notes
1979	Rakhe Allah Mare Ke			
1984	Bhat De	Yeazid Mia Shab	Amjad Hossain	
1988	Heeramoti		Amjad Hossain	Bangladesh National Film Award for Best Supporting Actor
1991	Danga	Kalu Miah	Kazi Hayat	Bangladesh National Film Award for Best Supporting Actor
1992	Chakor		Montazur Rahman Akbar	
1993	Chandabaz	Guru Bhai	Kazi Hayat	Bangladesh National Film Award for Best Actor in Negative Role
1993	Keyamat Theke Keyamat	Mirza Mohammad Salauddin	Sohanur Rahman Sohan	
1993	Don			
1994	Bikkhov	Mahmud Chowdhury	Mohammad Hannan	
1994	Ontore Ontore	Manik	Shibli Sadiq	
1995	Shopner Thikana	Mr. Kashem (Farha's father)		
1995	Babar Adesh		Montazur Rahman Akbar	
1995	Denmohor	Delowar Khan	Shafi Bikrampuri	
1995	Mohamilon	Kamal Chowdhury	Dilip Shom	
1996	Durjoy			
1996	Ajker Sontrasi			
1996	Sotter Mrittu Nei	Khan E Ali Khan	Chatku Ahmed	
1996	Sopner Prithibi	Zaminder Raihan Chowdhury	Badol Khandokar	
1996	Buker Bhetor Agun	Chowdhury Arman Siddiqui	Chaktu Ahmed	
1996	Ruti		Nadeem Mahmud	
1997	Hangor Nodi Grenade	Ramjan Ali	Chashi Nazrul Islam	
1998	Vondo	Raja Shikdar	Shahidul Islam Khokon	
1999	Mogher Mullok		Montazur Rahman Akbar	
1999	Dhor			
1999	Ananta Bhalobasha	Ashraf Chowdhury	Sohanur Rahman Sohan	
1999	Ammajan			
2000	Bidroho Charidike		Mohammad Hannan	Bangladesh National Film Award for Best Supporting Actor
2001	Hridoyer Bandhon	Raihan Chaudhary	F.I. Manik	
2001	Abbajan	Abbajan		
2001	Meghla Akash	SP Hawladar	Nargis Akter	
2002	O Priya Tumi Kothay		Shahadat Hossain Liton	
2002	Premer Taj Mahal	Abraham Dikosta	Gazi Mahbub	
2002	Bhalobasa Kare Koy	Ulondas	Jakir Hossain Raju	
2003	Jamai Shashur	Aftab Chowdhury	Shahadat Khan	
2003	Sahosi Manush Chai	Habildar Mokbul	Mohammad Hannan	Bangladesh National Film Award for Best Supporting Actor
2004	Megher Pore Megh	Rawshan Shikder	Chashi Nazrul Islam	
