= Coolie (1997 film) =

Bangladeshi action comedy film

- Thearetical Film poster of Coolie
- Directed by: Montazur Rahman Akbar
- Written by: Abdullah Zahir Babu
- Based on: Coolie No. 1 (1995 film)
- Produced by: A K Siddique
- Starring: Omar Sani; Sadika Parvin Popy; Amin Khan; Dildar; Humayun Faridi; Dolly Johur
- Cinematography: Lal Mohammad
- Edited by: Amzad Hossain
- Music by: Alam Khan
- Production company: Flamingo Movies
- Distributed by: Flamingo Movies
- Release date: 16 May 1997
- Running time: 145 minutes
- Country: Bangladesh
- Language: Bengali
- Budget: ৳1.20 crore (equivalent to ৳6.9 crore or US$560,000 in 2024)
- Box office: ৳7 crore (equivalent to ৳40 crore or US$3.3 million in 2024)

Coolie (Bengali: কুলি, 'Porter') is a 1997 Bangladeshi Dhallywood action comedy film, directed by Montazur Rahman Akbar and written by Abdullah Zahir Babu. AK Siddique produced the films under the banner of Flamingo Movies. The film stars Omar Sani and Sadika Parvin Popy in the leading roles with supporting roles played by Amin Khan, Dildar, Humayun Faridi, Dolly Johur and more. The film actress Sadika Parvin Popy started her career with the film. It was a remake of the 1993 Tamil film Chinna Mappillai.

== Cast ==
- Omar Sani - Raju Coolie
- Popy - Poppy, Raju's wife
- Amin Khan - Babu Driver, Ruju's friend
- Humayun Faridi - Keramat Ali Bepari, Poppy's father
- Dolly Johur - Raju's mother
- Mizu Ahmed - Badru, Rail station gangster
- Dildar - Asgar
- Nargis Akter Marjina - Asgar's wife
- Anisur Rahman - Matchmaker
- Ali Amjad - Janab Chowdhury
- Syed Akhtar Ali - Old Porter
- Jahanara - Poppys Aunty
- Songeeta - Rupa, Poppy's sister
- Farhad -

== Released ==
The film was released on 16 May 1997 on the occasion of Eid al-Fitr. It grossed ৳7crores ($1.6M as of May 1997), making it the highest-grossing Bangladeshi film of 1997.

== Music ==
Coolie's music is directed by Alam Khan. The songs are performed by Andrew Kishore, Runa Laila, Rizia Parveen, Doly Sayontoni and Humayun Faridi. Most of the songs of this film became very popular by the audience, especially Akashete Lakkho Tara sung by Rizia Parvin & Andrew Kishore

=== Track listing ===
No.	Title	Music	Singer	Length
1.	"Collie Amra Coolie"	Alam Khan	Andrew Kishore
2.	"Jare Valo Lage Jare Bhalobasi"	Alam Khan	Kanak Chapa & Andrew Kishore	5:03
3.	"Akashete Lakkho Tara"	Alam Khan	Rizia Pervin & Andrew Kishore	4:55
4.	"Rongin Ei Duniyate"	Alam Khan	Andrew Kishore, Runa Laila & Agun
5.	"January February"	Alam Khan	Runa Laila	5:03
6.	"Janona Janona Tumi"		Dolly Sayantani and Agun
