= Shabnur =

Bangladeshi actress

- শাবনূর
- Shabnur in 2018
- Born: Kazi Sharmin Nahid Nupur; 17 December 1979 (age 46); Nabharan, Jessore, Bangladesh
- Other name: Nupur
- Citizenship: Bangladesh; Australia (2012–present)
- Occupation: Actress
- Years active: 1993–present
- Spouse: Anik Mahmud 2012 (m. 2020, divorced)
- Children: 1
- Awards: Full list
- Website: https://www.facebook.com/shabnoor.sabnur

Kazi Sharmin Nahid Nupur (Bengali: কাজী শারমিন নাহিদ নূপুর; born 17 December 1979), known by her stage name Shabnur, is a Bangladeshi film actress. She was one of the highest-paid actresses in Bangladesh. Regarded as one of the most popular actresses of the 1990s, she appeared in over 150 films during her two-decade-long career.

She first appeared on screen in 1993 in the film Chandni Raatey, but her breakthrough came with Tumi Amar (1994), in which she starred alongside Salman Shah. This helped her quickly become a sensation in the industry and led her to act in big role movies such as Jibon Shongi, Shopner Thikana, Moner Majhe Tumi, Ananda Ashru.

She won Bangladesh National Film Award for Best Actress for her role in the film Dui Noyoner Alo (2005).

== Background ==
Kazi Sharmin Nahid Nupur was born on 17 December 1979 at Navaron, Jessore, Bangladesh. Her father is Shahjahan Chowdhury. She has a sister and a brother–Jhumur and Tamal.

== Career ==
Shabnur debuted her career with co-actor Shabbir in the 1993 film Chandni Raatey, directed by Ehtesham. Her first hit movie was Hridoy Amar with Amin Khan. She got her breakthrough in her third film Tumi Amar, co-starred with Salman Shah in 1994.

Shabnur co-acted with Salman until he died in 1996. She later acted with Omar Sunny, Riaz, Ferdous Ahmed, and Shakib Khan, among others.

After a year-long break, two films, Bhalobasha Saint Martin-e and Attogopon, with Shabnur were released in 2012. In 2013, she acted in Kichhu Asha Kicchu Bhalobasha.

After a years-long acting hiatus, Shabnur is slated to appear in two films in pre-production in 2024, Rangana, a thriller film directed by Arafat Hossain, and Matal Hawa, a film to be directed by Chayanika Chowdhury.

== Personal life ==
Shabnur got engaged to Anik Mahmud, a businessman, on 6 December 2011 and married on 28 December 2012. The couple officially got divorced on 26 January 2020 due to compatibility issues. Together they have a son.

Shabnur established a school, Sydney International School, in Baridhara, Dhaka in 2011. She resides in Sydney, Australia. She is an Australian citizen since 2012.

== Involvement with Salman Shah's murder ==
Some members of Salman Shah’s family publicly claimed that he had been murdered, naming several people as suspects, including Shabnur.

However, these were personal beliefs, not legal findings. As Salman Shah and Shabnur were a popular on-screen duo and many fans speculated that they were in a personal relationship, rumours began to circulate about Shabnur.

== Awards ==
In 2004 Shabnur won the Bachsas Award for best actress in the film Bou Shashurir Juddho.

She won the Bangladesh National Film Award for Best Actress in 2006 for her role in the film Dui Noyoner Alo (2005), and won Meril Prothom Alo Awards for best actress ten times.

In 2011 she received the CJFB Performance Award for Best Actress in the 2010 film Ebhabei Bhalobasha Hoy.

== Filmography ==
List of Shabnur film credits
Year	Title	Role	Director	Notes
1993	Chandni Raatey	Pinki	Ehtesham	
1994	Tumi Amar	Dana	Jahirul Haque	
1994	Sujon Sokhi	Sokhi	Shah Alam	
1994	Bikkhov	Nupur	Mohammad Hannan	
1994	Ashami Bodhu		Shah Alam Kiron	
1995	Shopner Thikana	Sumi	M A Khalek	
1995	Moha Milon	Sathi	Dilip Som	
1995	Moumasi	Nuri		
1996	Bichar Hobe	Aleya	Shah Alam Kiran	
1996	Tomake Chai	Nadi	Motin Rahman	
1996	Shopner Prithibi	Noor	Badol Khondokar	
1996	Jibon Songsar	Shelly	Jakir Hossen	
1996	Chawa Theke Pawa	Shabnam	M M Sarkar	
1996	Premer Ohongkar			
1996	Bazigaar	Alo		
1997	Shopner Nayok	Anna	Nasir Ahmed	
1997	Prem Piyashi	Antora	Reza Hasmat	
1997	Anondo Osru	Dola	Shibli Sadique	
1997	Buker Bhitor Agun	Rishita	Chatku Ahmed	
1997	Mon Manena	Nadi	Motin Rahman	
1997	Tumi shudhu Tumi		Abid Hasan	
1997	Odhikar Chai			
1998	Bhalobasi Tomake	Kajol	Mohammad Hannan	
1998	Buk Bhara Bhalobasa		Chhotku Ahmend	
1998	Prithibi Tomar Amar		Badal Khondoker	
1998	Rongin Noyon Moni	Moni		
1998	Biyer Phul	Nadi	Motin Rahman	
1998	Kajer Meye	Nadi	Azadi Hasnat	
1999	Ke Oporadi	Shima		
1999	Modhur Milon	Modhu		
1999	Tomar Janno Pagol		Shilpi Chakraborti	
1999	Sobar Ojante			
1999	Bhulo Na Amay			
2000	Asha Amar Asha	Asha	Helal Khan	
2000	Shesh Thikana		Motin Rahman	
2000	Jamin Nai			
2000	Narir Mon		Motin Rahman	
2000	E Badhon Jabena Chhire	Badhon	F I Manik	
2000	Bhownkor Bishu	Alo		
2000	Golam			
2000	Ei Mon Chai Je..!	Sangeeta	Motin Rahman	
2000	Karishma		A. K. M. Selim	
2000	Eri Nan Dosti		Syeedur Rahman	
2000	Nishwashe Tumi Bishwashe Tumi		Jakir Hossain Raju	
2001	Shoshurbari Zindabad	Prema	Debashish Biswas	
2001	Hridoyer Bandhon	Sagorika	F I Manik	
2001	Milon Habe Kato Dine	Pathor	Jakir Hossain Raju	
2001	Bostir Meye		Azadi Hasnat Firoz	
2002	Bhalobasha Kare Koy		Jakir Hossain Raju	Won—Best Actor BFPDA Film Awards
2002	Gundar Prem		Badsha Bhai	Re-released as Kala Manik in 2005
2002	Mon	Moni	Mustafizur Rahman Manik	
2002	Premer Taj Mahal	Liza (Alo)	Gazi Mahbub	Winner, Best song of 2002, Ei Buke Boiche Jamuna
2002	Nachnewali		Zillur Rahman	
2002	Ful Nebo Na Osro Nibo		Zillur Rahman	
2003	Matir Phul	Phul	Motin Rahman	
2003	Nashiman	Nashiman	Ali Azad	
2003	Swapner Bashor	Nodi	F I Manik	
2004	Swapner Bhalobasa		Zillur Rahman	
2004	Bhaier Shotru Bhai		Montazur Rahman Akbar	
2004	Prem Shonghat		Zillur Rahman	
2004	Hridoy Sudhu Tomar Jonno		Zillur Rahman	
2004	Noyon Vora Jol		Zillur Rahman	
2004	Bini Sutar Mala		Zillur Rahman	
2004	Bachelor	Shamma	Mostofa Sarwar Farooki	
2005	Bhalobasa Bhalobasa	Chhobi	Mohammad Hannan	
2005	Amar Swapno Tumi	Khushi	Mizan	
2005	Molla Barir Bou	Parul	Salahuddin Lavlu	
2005	Dhakaiya Pola Borishaler Maya		Mizan	
2005	Somadhi		Mizan	
2006	Nirontor		Abu Sayeed	
2006	Dui Noyoner Alo		Mustafizur Rahman Manik	Won—National Film Awards Best Actress 2006
2006	Bangla			
2006	Mayer Morjada		Dilip Biswas	
2006	Shami Strir Wada		Dilip Biswas	
2007	Amar Praner Swami		P A Kajol	
2007	Rosher Baidani		P A Kajol	
2007	Ei Je Duniya		Gazi Mazharul Anwar	
2008	Meye Sakkhi			
2008	Tomake Bou Banabo		Shahadat Hossain Liton	
2009	Tumi Amar Shami		Montazur Rahman Akbar	
2009	Jibon Niye Juddho			
2009	Mon Boshena Porar Table E		Abdul Mannan	
2009	Chander Moto Bou		Mohammad Hossain Jamie	
2009	Bolbo Kotha Bashor Ghore		Shah Mohammad Songram	
2009	Bodhu Tumi Kar		B R Chowdhury	
2009	Ebadot		ATM Shamsuzzaman	
2009	Swami Stirir Wada		P A Kajol	
2009	Bhalobeshe Bou Anbo		Chandan Chowdhury	
2009	Mon Chuyeche Mon		Mustafizur Rahman Manik	
2009	Piritir Agun Jole Digun		P A Kajol	
2010	Golapi Ekhon Bilatey		Amjad Hossain	
2010	Jekhane Tumi Sekhane Ami		Shawkat Jamil	
2010	Mughal-E-Azam		Mizanur Rahman	
2010	Evabey Bhalobasha Hoy			
2011	Ma Amar Chokher Moni		Mostafizur Rahman Manik	
2012	Attogopon		M M Sarkar	
2012	Bhalobasha St. Martins e		Shahidul Islam Khokon	
2012	Jiddi Bou		Abul Kalam Azad	
2013	Shiri Farhad	Shiri	Gazi Mahbub	
2013	Kichu Asha Kichu Bhalobasha		Mustafizur Rahman Manik	
2016	Shopner Bidesh		Nazrul Islam Khan	Unreleased
2018	Pagol Manush		MM Sarkar and Badiul Alam Khokon	
