= Ajante =

Bangladeshi film

- DVD Cover
- Directed by: Dilip Biswas
- Written by: Komol Sarkar
- Produced by: Gayotri Biswas
- Starring: Alamgir; Shabana; Sohel Rana; Suchorita; Riaz; Sonia; Imran; ATM Shamsuzzaman; Amol Bose
- Cinematography: Abul Khayer
- Edited by: Aminul Islam mintu
- Music by: Satya Saha
- Distributed by: Giti Chitrakotha
- Release date: 1996
- Running time: 148 min
- Country: Bangladesh
- Language: Bengali

Ajante (Bengali: অজান্তে, English: Unknowingly) is a Bangladeshi film released in 1996, directed by Bengali director Dilip Biswas. The film was remade in Bengali India in 1998 as Aamar Maa, which was directed by the same director. The screenplay was written by Komol Sarkar based on a family drama.

== Cast ==
- Alamgir – Mirja Shahriar
- Shabana - Kajal
- Sohel Rana - Asad
- Suchorita - Asha
- Riaz – Mirza Ashik
- Sonia

== Awards ==
Actor Sohel Rana won the Bangladesh National Film Award for Best Actor.
