= Kazi Morshed =

Bangladeshi film director

- কাজী মোরশেদ
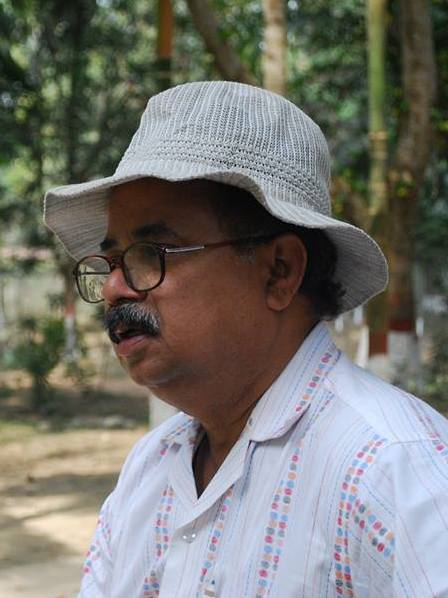
- Born: 24 April 1950; Hinguli, Mirsarai, Chittagong, East Bengal, Dominion of Pakistan
- Died: 3 October 2014 (aged 64); Dhaka, Bangladesh
- Occupation: Film director

Kazi Morshed (24 April 1950 – 3 October 2014) was a Bangladeshi film director. He won Bangladesh National Film Award for Best Director for his film Ghani (2006).

== Career ==
Morshed started working as an assistant director in the 1970s. Later he joined Bangladesh Betar as a program producer. He returned to the film industry under the guidance of the filmmaker Amjad Hossain.

== Filmography ==
- Shudhu Tumi (1997)
- Ghani (2006)

== Awards ==
- Shantona (1991) : Bangladesh National Film Award for Best Screenplay
- Ghani (2006) :
  - Bangladesh National Film Award for Best Film
  - Bangladesh National Film Award for Best Director
  - Bangladesh National Film Award for Best Story
  - Bangladesh National Film Award for Best Screenplay
  - Bangladesh National Film Award for Best Dialogue
