= Shahnaz (actress) =

Bangladeshi film actress

- শাহনাজ
- Occupation: Actress

Shahnaz (born Shahnaz Alam) is a Bangladeshi film actress. She acted in Sotter Mrittu Nei in 1996 where her co-star was Salman Shah.

Debuting with the film Mohoth, she rapidly established herself a leading actress through critical movies Ainer Hat, Criminal, Chaalbaaz, Joty, Lathi, Desher Mati, Hulia, Mrittudata, Tokai Rongbaz, Jhor, Baba Mastan, Desher Mati, Shanto Keno Mastan, Ruti, Gunda Number One, Tochnos, & Akheri Rasta,

== Selected filmography ==
- Sotter Mrittu Nei
- Top Somrat
- Ondho Ain
- Top Leader
- Mohot
- Monafek
- Bidrohi Konya
- Chalbaz
- Kolizar Tukra
- Banglar Ma
- Oshantir Agun
- Himmot
- Deshdrohi
- Prem Keno Kaday
- Dui Chor
- Time Nai
- Badha
- Bijli Tufan
- Lathi
- Asami Greftar
- Shanto Keno Mastan
- Atmotyag
- Bishwo Batpar
- Adorer Chhotovai
- Jomela Sundori
- Mayer Kosom
- Raja Keno Sontrasi
- Dushmon Dunia
- Ore Sampanwala
- Baba Mastan
- Ami Ek Omanush
- Lalu Kosai
- Ruti (1996)
