= Nabharan Union =

Nabharan Union নাভারণ ইউনিয়ন
- Union
- Nabharan Union
- Location within Bangladesh
- Coordinates: 23.0627°N 89.0135°E
- Country: Bangladesh
- Division: Khulna
- District: Jessore
- Upazila: Jhikargacha

Area
  - Total: 26.63 km^{2} (10.28 sq mi)

Population (2011)
  - Total: 33,019
  - Density: 1,240/km^{2} (3,211/sq mi)
- Time zone: UTC+6 (BST)
- Website: nabharanup.jessore.gov.bd

Nabharan Union (Bengali: নাভারন ইউনিয়ন) is a union parishad of the Jessore District in the Division of Khulna, Bangladesh. It has an area of 26.63 square kilometres and a population of 33,019.
