= Rangana =

Rangana is both a given name and a surname. Notable people with the name include:

- Rangana Herath (born 1978), Sri Lankan cricketer
- Rangana Premaratne (born 1959), Sri Lankan actor
- Ishan Rangana (born 1993), Sri Lankan cricketer
- Pradeep Rangana (born 1983), Sri Lankan medical doctor

== See also ==
- Rangana Fort, fort in India
