= Dildar (actor) =

Bangladeshi actor

- দিলদার
- Born: 13 January 1945; Chandpur district, Bengal Presidency, British India
- Died: 13 July 2003 (aged 58)
- Occupation: Actor
- Spouse: Rokeya Begum
- Children: 2

Dildar (13 January 1945 – 13 July 2003) was a Bangladeshi actor from the Chandpur district. He debuted in Bengali cinema in 1975 in the film Keno Amon Hoy. He was awarded Best Actor in a Comedy Role in 28th Bangladesh National Film Awards in 2003 for his role in the film Tumi Sudhu Aamar.

== Personal life ==
Dildar was married to Rokeya Begum. Together they had two daughters, Masuma Akter Ruma, a dentist and Zinia Afroz Shoma, a banker. Masuma got married on October 6, 1995 and has 1 son and 1 daughter. Zinia's husband died from cancer a few years ago.

== Filmography ==
- Abdullah (1997/1996)
- Tumi Ki Shei (2009)
- Shanto Keno Mastan (1998)
- Anondo Osru (1997)
- Shopner Nayok (1997)
- Shudhu Tumi (1997)
- Bichar Hobe (1997)
- Priyojon (1996)
- Ei Ghor Ei Songsar (1996)
- Shopner Prithibi (1996)
- Durjoy (1996)
- Ojante (1996)
- Sundor ali jibon songshar (1996)
- Chaoa theke paoa (1996)
- Konnadan (1995)
- Boner Raja Tarzan (1995) as Abdul Goni
- Antore antore (1995)
- Bikkhob(1994)
- Judge Barrister (1994) as Jilapi
- Ruti (1996)
- Beder Meye Josna (1989)
- Bir purush (1998)
- Nachnewali
- Aopner Thikana (1995)
- Jibon Songsar (1996)
