= Salman Shah (actor) =

Bangladeshi actor (1971–1996)

- সালমান শাহ
- Salman Shah
- Born: Chowdhury Muhammad Shahriar Emon; 19 September 1971; Sylhet, Bangladesh
- Died: 6 September 1996 (aged 24); Dhaka, Bangladesh
- Burial place: Shah Jalal Dargah Cemetery
- Education: Adamjee Cantonment College; Dr. Maleka University College
- Occupations: Film actor; television actor; playback singer; model; fashion icon
- Years active: 1986–1996
- Notable work: Keyamat Theke Keyamat; Sujan Sakhi; Shopner Thikana; Ei Ghor Ei Songsar; Sotter Mrittu Nei; Anondo Osru
- Spouse: Samira Huq (m. 1992)

Chowdhury Muhammad Shahriar Emon (19 September 1971 – 6 September 1996), known by his stage name Salman Shah, was a Bangladeshi film and television actor and model. Referred in the media as the "First Superstar of Dhallywood", (Note: Multiple sources:) he is widely regarded as the most influential and iconic figures in Bangladesh's film history. He is also known as a fashion icon.

Shah appeared in 27 films in a short acting career of three years He first gained attention for his debut film, Keyamat Theke Keyamat (1993), and in the following three years appeared in leading roles in a series of commercially successful films, including, Denmohor, Shujon Shokhi, Shopner Thikana, Ei Ghor Ei Shongsar, Sotter Mrittu Nei and Anondo Osru which established him as one of the most sought after leading men in the industry and a household name. Subsequently, he became the highest-paid actor in the industry. Three of his films, Shopner Thikana, Sotter Mrittu Nei and Keyamat Theke Keyamat are among the highest grossing films of all time in Dhallywood box office.

At the height of his fame, Shah was found dead in his apartment in Eskaton, Dhaka on 6 September 1996. His untimely death was noted to be a tragic event for the nation, which evoked unanimous public reactions of grief and many conspiracy theories. In 2021, after decades of controversies and speculation surrounding his death, Bangladesh's Police Bureau of investigation formally declared Shah's cause of death as suicide.

== Early life and education ==
Chowdhury Muhammad Shahriar Emon was born on 19 September 1971 at the Ab-e-Hayat Bhaban, the home of his maternal grandfather in Dariapara, Sylhet. He was the eldest son of Nila Chowdhury (née Nilufar Zaman Nila) and Qamaruddin Chowdhury (d. 2002), and his family was originally from Maizgram village in Barahal, Zakiganj. He had a younger brother named Chowdhury Muhammad Shahran Evan.

He studied at the Boyra Model High School in Khulna. He received his college education at Dhaka Residential Model College. Shah had great interest in arts and culture from his childhood. Everyone in his circle of friends knew him as a singer. In 1986, he passed in Palligiti or folk music from Chhayanaut. In 1987, he passed his matriculation from the Arab Mission School in Dhanmondi, Dhaka. After that, he completed his intermediate from the Adamjee Cantonment College, before proceeding to complete his Bachelor of Commerce degree from the Maleka Science College (now Dr. Maleka University College).

== Career ==
=== 1986–1992: Early work and acting background ===
Shah first appeared in public television in 1985 as a model for a music video produced by Hanif Sanket. He later worked on several commercials and played small parts in TV dramas. Being a registered artist of Bangladesh Television, some of the TV dramas he worked in the 1980s are Akash Chowa, Pathor Shomoy and Shoikote Sharosh.

=== 1993–1994: Debut in films and establishment ===
Shah made his acting debut in 1993 with the movie Keyamat Theke Keyamat along with another debutant actress Moushumi. Directed by Sohanur Rahman Sohan, the film was a remake of a Bollywood film Qayamat Se Qayamat Tak (1988). Production house Anand Mela approached Sohan with the intellectual rights of three Hindi films, Sanam Bewafa, Dil and Qayamat Se Qayamat Tak to remake any of those into Bengali. But he could not find suitable heroes and heroines for the said films and decided to produce the film with completely new faces. Subsequently, model Moushumi was chosen as the heroine, but he could not find a hero. Then Alamgir's ex-wife Khoshnoor Alamgir suggested a boy named 'Emon'. The director had seen his advertisement for Fanta and liked him at first sight. He offered him Sanam Bewafa, but when Emon came to know about Qayamat Se Qayamat Tak, he insisted on acting in the film. Finally director Sohanur Rahman decided to make the said movie with him and Emon was renamed Salman Shah. Keyamat theke Keyamat became an instant hit and established Shah as a romantic lead actor in Dhalliwood. The success of the Salman-Moushumi "romantic duo" led to their casting in three more feature films Ontare Ontare, Denmohor and Sneho. Later, Shah co-starred with actress Shabnur in a number of commercially successful films including Shopner Thikana and Anondo Osru.

Shah had six releases in 1994. His first release was Zahirul Haque's romantic drama Tumi Amar opposite Shabnur. It was the first of the pair's many successful collaborations. Shah's avatar in the film was noted to be a representative of the ambitious and rebellious youth of that time. He played the heir of a Zamindar family in Shibli Sadik's romantic comedy Ontare Ontare opposite Mousumi. He took the leading role of Shujon in the remake of Khan Ataur Rahman's rural drama Sujan Sakhi. It was Shah's first attempt at playing a character with a rural backdrop. Critics noted his commitment to the role with the mannerisms, body language, and accent of a village boy. Shah played a student leader in Mohammad Hannan's political drama Bikkhov. The movie earned acclaim, and Shah received praise for the depth and sincerity he put into his performance. He was a major favorite to win the Bangladesh National Film Award for Best Actor for the film but lost out to Alamgir. Due to the success of these films, Shah was able to establish himself as one of the most sought after leading men in the industry. He next appeared in Gazi Mazharul Anwar's Sneho where Shah starred with veterans Shabana, Alamgir and Humayun Faridi. His last release was the coming-of-age film Prem Judho opposite Lima where Shah played a father for the first time. The film didn't fare well at the box office. Shah was a playback singer in one of the songs of the album.

In the same year, he starred in the TV drama Itikotha which was based on the rural garments industry. He played an English returned artisan named Yusuf.

=== 1995–1996: Commercial successes, acclaim and superstardom ===
The year 1995 was a vital year in Shah's career from commercial perspectives. He starred in Shopner Thikana, the biggest blockbuster of his career and the second highest grossing Bangladeshi film of all time. His other successful films that year were Shafi Bikrampuri's family drama Denmohor which was his last film with Mousumi, the romantic drama Moha Milon where he starred with veteran actress Bobita as her son and the comedy-drama Asha Bhalobasha opposite Shabnaz. His other releases that year namely Delwar Jahan Jhantu's Konnadan and Anjuman were commercial disappointments.

In the same year, he acted in the hit and acclaimed TV drama Noyon playing the dual roles of twin brothers Sultan and Raj co-starring Shomi Kaiser.

1996 was a prolific year in Shah's career. He starred in nine films. His first was rural and social drama Bichar Hobe where he reunited with director Shah Alam Kiran and Humayun Faridi. Shah played a villager who comes to the city to find his brother. The film was a success. His next release was Malek Afsari's acclaimed family drama Ei Ghor Ei Songsar where he co-starred with Bulbul Ahmed, Rosy Afsari and Ali Raj. His next was playing a sacrificial leading man in Priyojon. Shah starred with Shabnur in Motin Rahman's superhit romantic musical Tomake Chai. His chemistry with Shabnur was appreciated.

His next release was Badal Khandakar's superhit social drama Shopner Prithibi where he played a Prince who rebels against his ruler father played by Rajib. The scenes depicting their conflicts were touted to be the main highlight of the film. It was his last film released while he was alive. Due to these consistent successes and critical acclaims Shah was labeled a Superstar by the media at the time.

His next film Sotter Mrittu Nei released a week after his death on 13 September. The social drama co-starring Alamgir, Shabana and Shahnaz had Shah playing a man convicted of murder. The film turned out to be a blockbuster at the box office. Shah's performance in the film and song "Chithi Elo Jelkhana Te" were widely acclaimed.

He also featured in Jibon Songsar which was Jakir Hossain Raju's first directorial. He then reunited with Shibli Sadik in the successful family drama Mayer Odhikar. His portrayal of a son fighting for his mother's rights against his grandmother played by veteran actress Ferdousi Mazumder was acclaimed. His last release of the year was Chawa Theke Pawa in which his on-screen stylish avatar was appreciated.

=== 1997: Final projects, posthumous releases and unfinished films ===
Shah wrote and acted in his last BTV drama titled "Shopner Prithibi" co-starring Tanvin Sweety and Kazi Hayat. It was the debut of Sweety in television.

Due to his unexpected death in 1996, all of Shah's five films in 1997 were posthumously released with him not being able to finish any of them completely. The directors of these films used dummies (Chawa Theke Pawa), cast another actor to finish the film (Shudhu Tumi) or altered the story (Prem Piyashi). As a result none of them except Anondo Osru fared well at the box office. The title of his film Shopner Nayok or "Dream Hero" is famously used as a moniker associated with Shah by fans to describe his short career and wide appeal. Shibly Sadik's third association with Shah, Anondo Osru was a huge success and was heavily acclaimed for its depiction of a tragic romance. Shah played Dewan Khosru, a musician who loses his mental stability as a result of a conspiracy by his uncle played by Humayun Faridi. Though he died before dubbing for the film, his performance of a mentally challenged musician is cited by critics and media to be one of the finest in Bangladeshi cinema. His final released film was Chotku Ahmed's Buker Bhitor Agun.

Shah died halfway through the shooting of several movies including Mon Mane Na, Ke Oporadhi, Rinshodh, Tumi Shudhu Tumi, Premer Baazi. Later, the rest of the movies except Premer Baazi were reshot with other actors. Among Shah's unfinished films, Premer Baazi was the only one that was never completed.

Shah was also supposed to star opposite Popy in Montazur Rahman Akbar's Coolie but was replaced after his death with Omar Sani. It was the highest grossing Dhallywood movie of 1997.

== Personal life ==

Salman Shah's professional achievements and personal life have constantly been the subject of tabloid discussions. Shah married Samira Huq, daughter of cricketer Shafiqul Huq Hira on 12 August 1992. Huq was a beauty parlor entrepreneur. Shah was a major enthusiast of music, fashion and automobiles. Many of his colleagues in the industry have noted his friendly behavior, good heartedness and helpful nature towards everyone. Shah shared a good relationship with Indian actor Shah Rukh Khan and visited the latter's home in Mumbai in 1995.

== Death ==
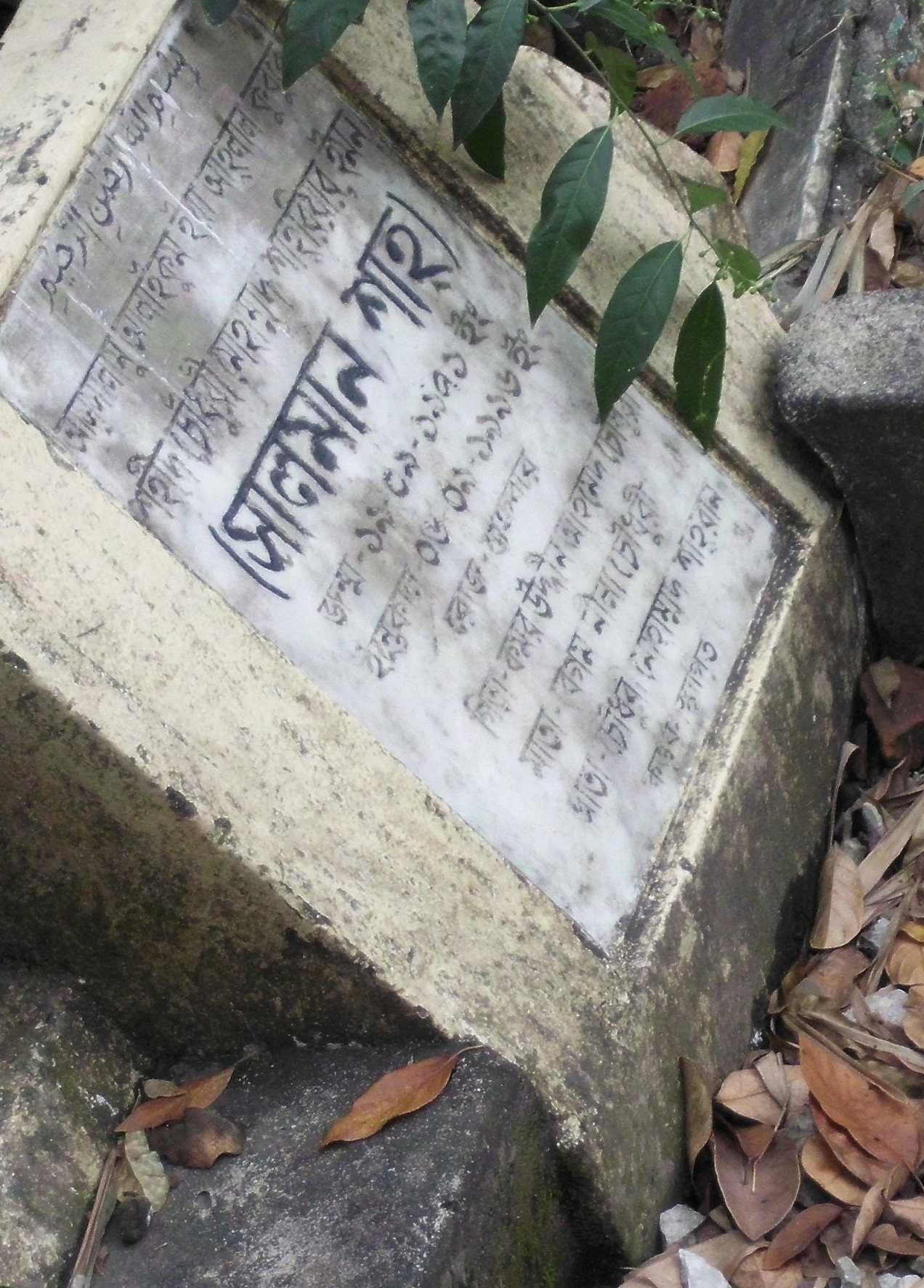
Epitaph on Shah's gravestone located in the graveyard at Shah Jalal Dargah, Sylhet

On 6 September 1996, Shah was found hanging from the ceiling of his bedroom at Eskaton, Dhaka. Police had filed a case of suicide, but the family objected to it and lodged a murder case. Business tycoon Aziz Mohammad Bhai was alleged to be involved in the murder. Rezvi Ahmed was arrested from the house of Shah's mother, who reportedly named Aziz Mohammad Bhai and Shah's wife Samira Haque for ordering the hit. Rezvi later disavowed his confession. On 24 February 2020, the Police Bureau of Investigation completed its investigation and reported that Salman Shah had killed himself due to a family dispute over his affair with one of the most popular silver screen actresses at the time, actress Shabnur. However, On 20 October 2025, a Dhaka court ordered a murder case over actor Salman Shah's death after 29 years. Kanak Chapa has said on a YouTube video that Salman Shah appeared to be mentally disturbed before he passed away.

A Dhaka court ordered the case to be registered and investigated as murder, nullifying the 2021 final report from the Police Bureau of Investigation (PBI) which had concluded the death was a suicide.

The 6th Additional Metropolitan Sessions Judge, Md. Jannatul Ferdous Ibn Haque, passed the order after accepting a revision petition filed by Salman Shah's mother, Neela Chowdhury. The court directed the officer-in-charge (OC) of Ramna Model Police Station to treat the original complaint as a murder case.

Following the court's directive, Salman Shah's maternal uncle, Mohammad Alamgir Kumkum, filed a formal murder case at Ramna police station late on October 20. The new case names 11 individuals as accused, including Salman Shah's wife Samira Haque, businessman Aziz Mohammad Bhai, and actor Ashraful Haque (Don). The case has now been assigned to Ramna Model Police Station for investigation.

On August 9, 2026, actor Mohammad Ashraful Haque, widely known by his stage name Don, was arrested by immigration police at Hazrat Shahjalal International Airport in Dhaka while attempting to travel to Saudi Arabia to perform Umrah. He was named as an accused in the murder case of Salman Shah. Following his arrest, he was handed over to the Criminal Investigation Department (CID) and subsequently produced before a Dhaka court, which ordered him to be sent to jail.

Shah is buried in Shah Jalal Dargah Cemetery in Sylhet.

== Legacy and influence ==
Shah appeared in films from a variety of genres such as family dramas, comedies, social and political dramas, action films, rural dramas, coming of age stories, romance and tragedies. He was known for his versatility and ability to play a wide range of characters as a leading young man with his distinctive style of acting and personality achieving both critical acclaim and commercial success. Considered photogenic, Shah is recognized as a major youth and fashion icon in the Bangladeshi media. Film analysts give Shah the credit for pioneering a new brand of meaningful cinema and introducing the modern era of leading men with his artistry and fashion.

Shah is regarded as one of the most prominent actors of Dhallywod, and a major figure in Bangladeshi cinema He gained widespread popularity for his performances, screen presence, dialogue delivery, and influence on fashion and popular culture. Media outlets referred to him as "Amar Mahanayak," or, "The Immortal Hero". Film commentators note his acting style, facial expressions, body language, and fashion sense, describing them as influential in Bangladeshi popular culture. He is often named the successor of pioneer Bangladeshi actor Razzak by the media. He is cited as a fashion icon, with several of his fashion choices becoming trends during the 1990's, while is acting is the inspiration for a number of Bangladeshi entertainers including Shakib Khan, Arifin Shuvo, Sariful Razz, Siam Ahmed and Nirab Hossain.

Salman Shah was also known for his philanthropic work, particularly in the areas of education and healthcare. He established the Salman Shah Foundation to provide scholarships and financial assistance to underprivileged students, and to support healthcare initiatives in Bangladesh.

In recognition of his contributions to the film industry, the Bangladesh Film Development Corporation established a statue of him in FDC, Dhaka. On his birth anniversary, the Salman Shah Smriti Parishad (Salman Shah Memorial Council) organizes a festival every year. Every few months later the Bangladesh Film Archive organize and hold screenings of the digitalized versions of his movies for free due to public demand from new plethora of fans.

== Filmography ==
=== Films ===
Year	Title	Role	Notes	Ref.
1993	Keyamat Theke Keyamat	Raj	Debut film	
1994	Tumi Amar	Akash		
1994	Ontore Ontore	Shaan		
1994	Sujon Sokhi	Sujon		
1994	Bikkhov	Anik		
1994	Sneho	Emon		
1994	Prem Juddho	Raja		
1995	Den Mohor	Sarowar		
1995	Konna Dan	Srabon		
1995	Shopner Thikana	Sumon		
1995	Anjuman	Salman		
1995	Moha Milon	Shanto		
1995	Asha Bhalobasha	Akash		
1996	Bichar Hobe	Sujon		
1996	Ei Ghor Ei Songsar	Ahmed Humayun Mintu		
1996	Priyojon	Jibon		
1996	Tomake Chai	Sagor		
1996	Shopner Prithibi	Masum		
1996	Shotter Mrittu Nei	Joy	Posthumous release	
1996	Jibon Songshar	Sobuj	Posthumous release	
1996	Mayer Odhikar	Robin	Posthumous release	
1996	Chawa Theke Pawa	Sagor	Posthumous release	
1997	Prem Piyashi	Hridoy / Jibon Chowdhury	Posthumous release	
1997	Shopner Nayok	Raju / Rasel	Posthumous release	
1997	Shudhu Tumi	Akash	25th film; posthumous release	
1997	Anondo Osru	Dewan Khosru	Posthumous release	
1997	Buker Bhitor Agun	Agun	Posthumous release	

=== Television ===
Year	Shows	Role	Notes	Ref.
1985	Akash Chowa	Emon	Television film	
1988	Shoikote Sharosh	Rabbi	Television film	
1990	Pathor Shomoy	Shahriar	Drama serial on BTV	
1994	Itikotha	Yusuf	Drama serial on BTV	
1994	Doyel	Emon	Television film	
1995	Sob Pakhi Ghore Fere	Salman	Television film	
1995	Noyon	Sultan / Raj	Television film	
1996	Shopner Prithibi	Shuvo	Television film	

== See also ==
- Buker Moddhye Agun – Bangladeshi drama streaming television series
