= Sujon Sokhi (1975 film) =

Bangladesh film

- Poster
- Directed by: Khan Ataur Rahman
- Starring: Kabori Sarwar; Farooque; Rawshan Jamil; Sumita Devi; Khan Ataur Rahman
- Music by: Khan Ataur Rahman
- Release date: 11 October 1975
- Running time: 111 minutes
- Country: Bangladesh
- Language: Bengali

Sujon Sokhi (Bengali: সুজন সখী) is a 1975 Bangladeshi film directed by Khan Ataur Rahman. The film received critical acclaim, particularly for the performance given by Kabori Sarwar, who won Bachsas Award for Best Actress. Both Sabina Yasmin and Abdul Alim earned Bangladesh National Film Awards for the song "Sob Sokhire Par Korite". The film was popularly remade in Bangladesh in color by director Shah Alam Kiran starring renowned duo Salman Shah and Shabnur in 1994 with the same title. It was also remade in West Bengal (India) in 1995, which was directed by Swapan Saha.

== Plot ==
Lokhman, his wife and their son Sujon live with his step mother, step brother Solaiman and his pregnant wife whom Lokhman and his wife detest. However, they think of them as their own and Solaiman and his mother love Sujon a lot. Lokhman and his wife later throw them out of the house with Solaiman giving his wealth share to Sujon. Solaiman and his family start a new life. However his wife dies after giving birth to their daughter Sokhi which heartbreaks him more. Years later, Sujon and Sokhi fall in love and vow to reunite the family.

== Cast ==
- Kabori Sarwar as Sokhi
- Farooque as Sujon
- Sumita Devi-Sujon's mother
- Siraj Haider
- Khan Ataur Rahman-Solaiman
- Rawshan Jamil-Solaiman's mother
- Suja Khondokar

== Music ==
All music were composed by Khan Ataur Rahman.

"Sob Sokhire Par Korite" - Sabina Yasmin and Abdul Alim

== Awards ==
Bangladesh National Film Awards

- Best Screenplay - Khan Ataur Rahman
- Best Male Playback Singer - Abdul Alim
- Best Female Playback Singer - Sabina Yasmin

Bachsas Awards

- Best Actress - Kabori Sarwar
