= Motin Rahman =

Bangladeshi film director

Matin Rahman
- মতিন রহমান
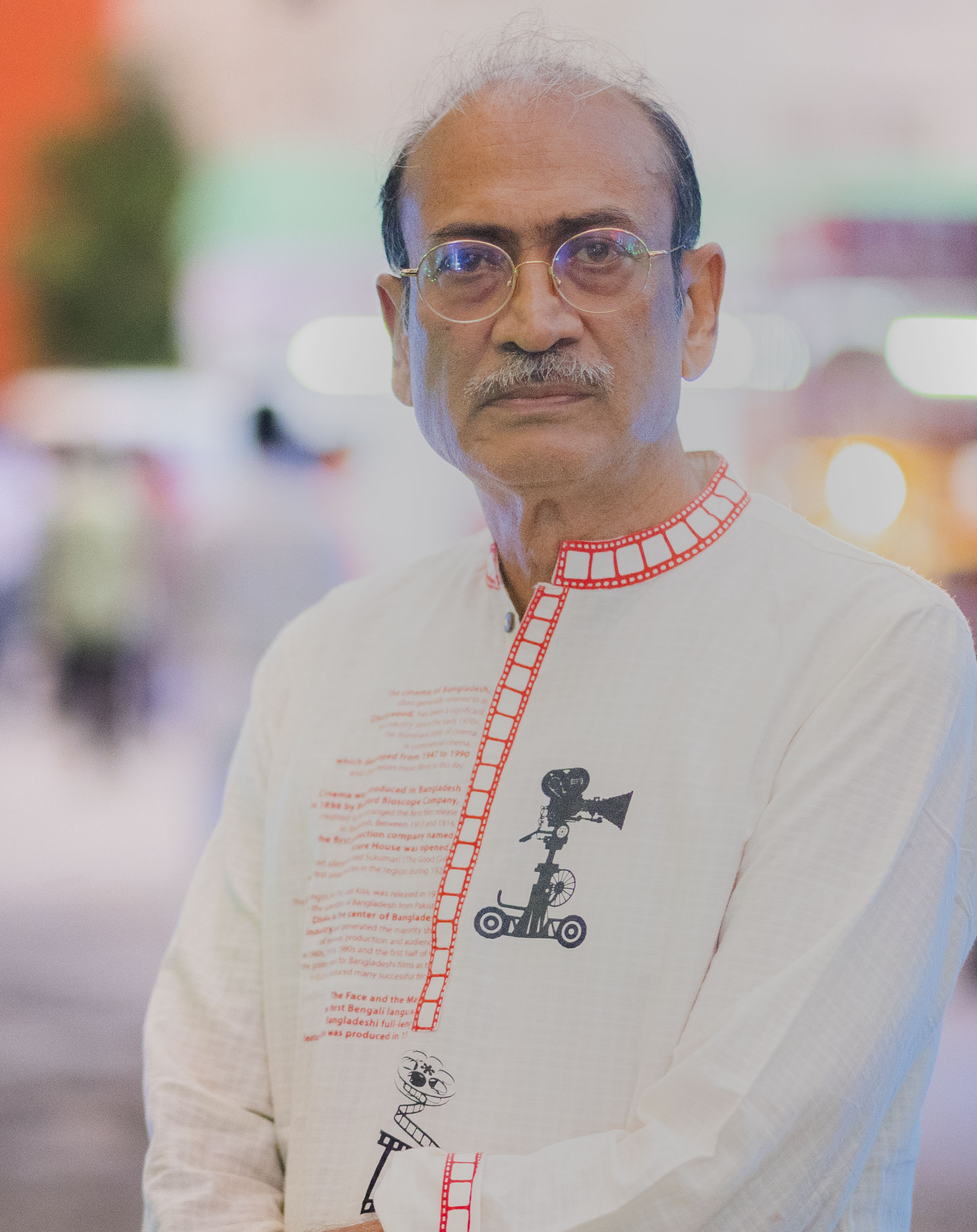
- Born: 30 May 1952 (age 73); Naogaon District, Bangladesh
- Occupations: Film director, teacher
- Years active: 1973–present
- Notable work: Lal Kajol
- Spouse: Nasima Khanom
- Children: 3
- Awards: National Film Awards

Matin Rahman (Bengali: মতিন রহমান) is a Bangladeshi film director. He is also known for being a film writer and actor. His debut film was Lal Kajol. In 1993, he won Bangladesh National Film Awards as the Best Director for the film Andho Biswas.

== Early life ==
Matin Rahman was born on 30 May 1952 in Naogaon District. He is the eldest of seven brothers and two sisters. He spent his childhood in and graduation from Santahar village. Later in 1973, he came to Dhaka for the study from Alamgir Kabir Film Institute. He is the first student to complete master's degree from journalism.

Since 2004, Rahman has taught at Stamford University Bangladesh. He received a Ph.D. in cinema from Jahangirnagar University in 2019, for a thesis entitled "Applied technique and perception of folk material of Bangladeshi film".

== Personal life ==
Matin Rahman is married to Nasima Khanam. They live in Mohammadpur, Dhaka. They have two daughters, Naushin and Naurin, and one son Mrittik Rahman.

== Filmography ==
| Year | Film | Direction | Screenwriter | Dialogue writer | Actor | Language | Note |
|---|---|---|---|---|---|---|---|
| 1972 | Atithi | | | | Yes | Bengali | |
| 1979 | Matir Ghor | | Yes | Yes | | Bengali | Worked as an assistant director |
| 1982 | Lal Kajol | Yes | | | | Bengali | |
| | Chitkar | Yes | | | | Bengali | |
| | Swargo Narok | Yes | | | | Bengali | |
| | Sneher Badhon | Yes | | | Yes | Bengali | |
| 1988 | Jibon Dhara | Yes | | | | Bengali | |
| 1989 | Ranga Vabi | Yes | Yes | | | Bengali | |
| 1989 | Birangona Sakhina | Yes | | | | Bengali | |
| 1992 | Ondho Biswas | Yes | Yes | | | Bengali | Won: National Film Awards Best Director |
| 1992 | Radha Krishna | Yes | | | | Bengali | |
| 1996 | Tomake Chai | Yes | Yes | | | Bengali | |
| 1997 | Mon Mane Na | Yes | | | | Bengali | |
| 1999 | Biyer Ful | Yes | Yes | | | Bengali | |
| 2000 | Narir Mon | Yes | | | Yes | Bengali | |
| 2000 | Ei Mon Chay Je...! | Yes | | | | Bengali | |
| 2003 | Matir Ful | Yes | | | | Bengali | |
| 2003 | Bou Shashurir Juddho | | | | Yes | Bengali | |
| | Mohobbat Jindabad | Yes | | | | Bengali | |
| 2004 | Wrong Number | Yes | | | | Bengali | |
| 2005 | Rakkhusi | Yes | | | Yes | Bengali | |
| 2008 | Tomakei Khujchi | Yes | | | | Bengali | |

== Awards ==
| Year | Awards | Category | Film | Results |
|---|---|---|---|---|
| 1993 | National Film Awards | Best Director | Andho Biswas | Won |
