= Amin Khan (actor) =

Bangladeshi film actor

- আমিন খান
- Born: Amin Khan; 24 December 1972 (age 53); Satkhira, Khulna, Bangladesh
- Education: Ideal College
- Occupation: Actor
- Years active: 1990–present
- Spouse: Sneegdha Khan
- Children: 2
- Relatives: Amit Hasan (brother-in-law)

Amin Khan (born 24 December 1972) is a Bangladeshi film actor. Khan has appeared in about 200 films as well as television shows. His debut film is Obujh Duti Mon: The Innocent Love (1993) established him as a successful lead actor.

Some of his roles as a supporting protagonist in films such as Coolie, Shopner Nayok, Ke Amar Baba, Bhai Keno Asami, Artonad, Shoytan Manush, Banglar Commando and Matribhumi have played a huge role in saving his stardom. His career unfortunately declined as he went on to become a supporting actor after 2006. Some of his successful movies as a supporting character alongside lead actors are Pitar Ason, Mayer Chokh and Chotto Songsar.

== Early life ==
Khan was born and grew up in greater Khulna. He then went to Dhaka to live with his uncle. "My uncle taught me how to fight shyness. He used to make me wear a lungi and make me walk to Mokbazar" said Amin Khan. From there, director Mohammad Hossain acted him in the famous film Obujh Duti Mon. He grew in the hearts of many people.

Khan studied at Ideal College, Dhaka.

== Career ==
In 1990, he came into the media through a competition named Notun Mukher Shondhane. He started acting in a 1993 movie titled Obuj Duti Mon, which was directed by Mohammad Hossain. One of the films that brought him to attention was Soitan Manush directed by Montazur Rahman Akbar. He was acted akbar blockbuster film Coolie.

Amin Khan is currently serving as the senior executive director at Walton.

== Filmography ==
Year	Title	Role	Notes	Ref.
1993	Obujh Duti Mon: The Innocent Love	Shagor	Debut film	
1994	Duniar Badsha	Abdullah		
1994	Hridoy Theke Hridoy	Joy Chowdhury		
1994	Moha Vumikompo	Amit Dada		
1994	Chirodiner Shathi	Sujon		
1995	Banglar Commando	Joy		
1995	Hridoy Amar	Hridoy		
1995	Dost Amar Dushmon	Murad		
1995	Bir Shontan	Agun		
1995	Love Letter	Abir		
1995	Shesh Rokkha	Roni		
1996	Soitan Manush	Inspector Akash		
1997	Jonom Jonom	Hridoy		
1997	Amar Maa	Munna		
1997	Coolie	Babu		
1997	Spordha	Raju		
1998	Moner Moto Mon	Raja	Indo-Bangladesh joint production	
1998	Ranga Bou	Raja		
1998	Sagorika			
1999	Ke Amar Baba			
1999	Love in Singapore			
1999	Mogher Mulluk			
2001	Kothin Bastob			
2001	Thekao Mastan	Durjoy		
2002	Laal Doriya	Doriya / Shimul		
2002	Hira Chuni Panna	Durjoy		
2006	Pitar Ason			
2008	Boro Vai Zindabad			
2008	Bodhu Boron			
2008	Peshadar Khuni			
2008	Somadhi			
2009	Thekao Andolon			
2009	Prithibi Takar Golam			
2009	Kallu Mama			
2009	Mukhomukhi	Raja		
2009	Uttejito	Riyad		
2009	Jiboner Cheye Dami	Nayon Rahman		
2009	Shubho Bibaho	Himself	Special appearance	
2009	Boner Jonno Juddho	Raju		
2010	Amar Swapno Amar Songshar	Pavel		
2010	Tumi Chara Bachina	Noyon	Released on Ntv	
2010	Mayer Chokh	Doctor Akash		
2010	Majhir Chele Barrister	Barrister Mamun		
2010	Shami Amar Behesht	Akash		
2011	Sathi Hara Nagin	Nagraj / Mohon		
2011	Paper Prayeschitta	Nazrul		
2011	Goriber Mon Onek Boro	Badol		
2012	Shami Vaggo	Raja		
2012	Nayori	Ujjal Majhi		
2012	O Amar Desher Mati	Monir		
2014	Kacher Shotru	Tiger / Lubu		
2014	Khov	Inspector Biplob		
2014	Lobe Pap Pape Mrittu	Shaheb		
2016	Ek Jobaner Jomidar Hare Galen Ei Bar	Ali		
2019	Obotar	Mukto		
2019	Farayeji Andolon 1842	Dudu Miyan		
2025	Direct Attack	Imran		

== TV drama ==
- Shudhu Tumi (1997)

== Telefilm ==
Year	Telefilm	Director	Role	Source
2012	Bhu-Chitra	written and directed by Sanjoy Barua		
2013	Ami Tumi Shey	Taju Kamrul		
2013	Na Bola Valobasha	Taju Kamrul		
2015	Nisshash	Imran Hussain Imu		
2015	Love Speed	GM Shoikat		

== See also ==
- Cinema of Bangladesh
