= Sotter Mrittu Nei =

1996 Bengali film

- Movie poster
- সত্যের মৃত্যু নেই
- Directed by: Chatku Ahmed
- Screenplay by: Chatku Ahmed
- Story by: Abdullah Zahir Babu
- Starring: Salman Shah; Shahnaz
- Cinematography: Shahidullah Dulal
- Edited by: Monir Hossain Abul
- Music by: Alauddin Ali
- Production company: Anand Movies
- Release date: 14 September 1996
- Country: Bangladesh
- Box office: 11.5 Cr

Sotter Mrittu Nei is a 1996 Bangladeshi film directed by Chatku Ahmed starring Salman Shah and Shahnaz.

== Plot ==
Joy accepts a murder he didn't commit to save his mother's reputation from being found out by the public that she lied about his involvement. However, she saves him from being hanged for the crime after proving his innocence.

== Cast ==
- Salman Shah as Joy
- Shahnaz as Brishti
- Alamgir as Joy's father
- Shabana as Salma, Joy's mother
- Shahrukh Shah as Rana
- Anwar Hossain as Joy's grandfather
- Raisul Islam Asad
- Rajib as Khan E Ali Khan
- Misha Sawdagor as Tiger, Khan E Ali Khan's son
- Tushar Khan
- Babul Ahmed
- Alka Sarkar
- Sharmin
- Zamilur Rahman Saka
- Dulal Sarkar
- Shila Ahmed
- Sanowar Morshed
- Azharul Islam Khan
- Mozid Bongobashi
- Syed Akhter Ali
- Fokira

== Screenings ==
The film was screened in 2017 as part of the Bangladesh Film Festival and in 2019 to celebrate what would have been the 48th birthday of Salman Shah.
