= Anondo Osru (1997 film) =

1997 film by Shibli Sadik

- Poster
- Directed by: Shibli Sadik
- Written by: Zaman Akhter
- Screenplay by: Shibli Sadik
- Produced by: Nurul Islam Raz
- Starring: Salman Shah; Shabnur; Kanchi; Dolly Zahur; Humayun Faridi
- Cinematography: Mujibul Haque Bhuiyan
- Edited by: Mujibur Rahman Dulu
- Music by: Ahmed Imtiaz Bulbul
- Production company: Kollol Kothachitro
- Distributed by: Anupam Movies
- Release date: 1 August 1997
- Running time: 148 minutes
- Country: Bangladesh
- Language: Bengali

Anondo Osru (English: Tears of Happiness) (Bengali: আনন্দ অশ্রু) is a 1997 Bangladeshi film starring Salman Shah, Shabnur and Kanchi in main roles.

== Cast ==
- Salman Shah
- Shabnur
- Kanchi
- Dolly Zohur
- Humayun Faridi
- Nana Shah

== Story ==
Salman Shah plays a left-home lyricist, who writes sad songs. He goes to a village, and falls in love with a simple girl, Nuri (Shabnur). Society doesn't appreciate this uneven love.

== Music ==
The film's music and lyrics were composed by Ahmed Imtiaz Bulbul.

Track	Song title	Playback singer(s)
1	"Tumi Amar Emoni Ekjon"	Kanak Chapa
2	"Tumi Mor Jiboner Bhabona - 1"	Andrew Kishore and Salma Jahan
3	"Thakto Jodi Premer"	Konok Chapa
4	"Uttore Bhoyongkor Jongol"	Salma Jahan
5	"Kon Daaler Pakhirey"	Subir Nandi
6	"Sheeth Kaaler Bhapa"	Shakila Jafar and Dilruba
7	"Tumi Mor Jiboner Bhabona - 2"	Andrew Kishore and Konok Chapa
