= Shibli Sadik =

Bangladeshi film director

Shibly Sadick
- শিবলি সাদিক
- Born: 9 January 1941; Naogaon, Bengal Presidency, British India
- Died: 7 January 2010 (aged 68); Dhaka, Bangladesh
- Resting place: Banani Graveyard, Dhaka
- Occupations: Film director, screenwriter, dialogue writer, actor
- Years active: 1973–2010
- Awards: National Film Awards (2nd time); Bachsas Awards

Shibli Sadik (9 January 1941 – 7 January 2010) was a Bangladeshi film director. He won National Film Awards and Bachsas Awards.

== Career ==
Sadik started his career as an assistant director with Mustafizur Rahman. His notable films are Nolok, Jibon Niye Juya, Tin Kanya, Dolna, Bheja Chokh, Achena, Ma Mati Desh, Ananda Ashru, Mayer Adhikkar, and Antore Antore. In 2006, his last directed film Bideshini was released.

== Filmography ==
Year	Film	Director	Story writer	Screenwriter	Dialogue writer	Notes
196?	Bala	Yes				First directed film with Syed Awal (Jointly)
1968	Shit Basonto	Yes				First directed film (single)
1984	Mahanayak				Yes	
1985	Teen Kanya	Yes			Yes	
1985	Suruj Mia				Yes	
1987	Surrender				Yes	
1988	Veja Chokh	Yes				
1990	Dolna	Yes	Yes			Won Best Screenwriter National Film Awards
1991	Ochena	Yes	Yes	Yes		
1992	Tyag	Yes	Yes			
1994	Ontore Ontore	Yes	Yes			
1996	Mayer Adhikar	Yes	Yes			
1997	Anondo Osru	Yes	Yes			
1999	Paharadar	Yes	Yes			
2006	Bideshini	Yes				Last directed film
2015	Shabnam	Yes				Late released directed film

== Death ==
Sadick died from prostate cancer on 7 January 2010 . After the funeral, he was buried at Banani Graveyard alongside his parents.
