= Chatku Ahmed =

Bangladeshi film director, writer and producer

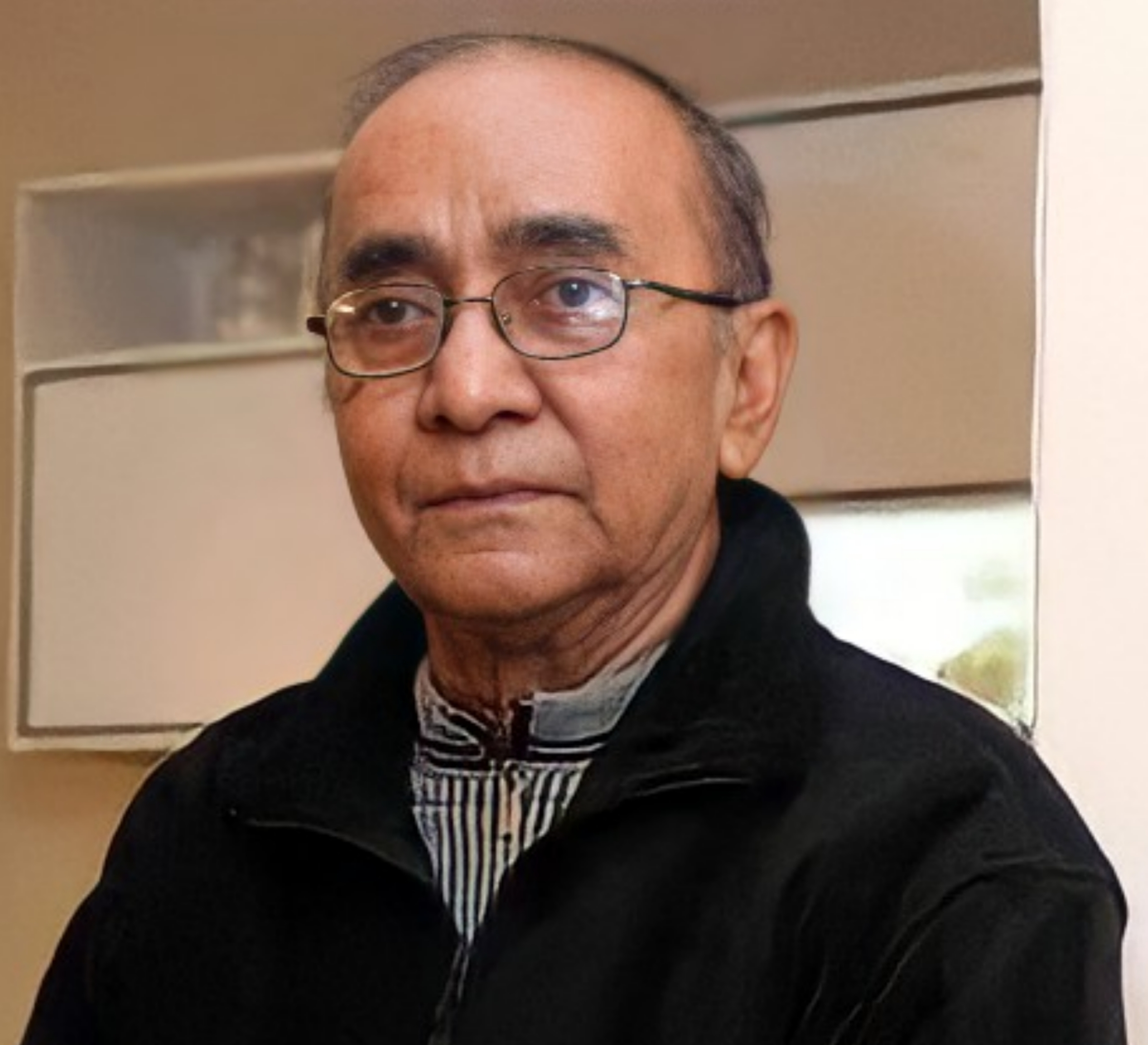
- Born: Syed Uddin Ahmed; 6 October 1946 (age 79); Munshiganj District, British Raj
- Occupations: Film director, Producer, Screenwriter
- Years active: 1962–present
- Awards: Bachsas Awards (1986); National Film Awards (1989)

Syed Uddin Ahmed, popularly known as Chatku Ahmed (born 6 October 1946) is a Bangladeshi film director, producer, dialogue writer and screenwriter. In 1986, he won the Bachsas Awards in 3 categories for the film Griha Bibad. He won Bangladesh National Film Awards in best dialogue writer category for Satya Mithya film in 1989.

His film Sotter Mrittu Nei is one of the highest grossing Bangladeshi films of all time.

== Early life ==
Ahmed was born on 6 October 1946 in the village of Panhata in Munshiganj District of the then British Raj.

== Filmography ==
- Naat Bou (transl. Granddaughter-in-law) (1982)
- Rajdondo (transl. The scepter) (1984)
- Griho Bibad (transl. Domestic dispute) (1986)
- Attyachar (transl. Torture) (1987)
- Chetona (transl. Consciousness) (1990)
- Maya Momota (transl. Loving kindness) (1994)
- Sotter Mrittu Nei (transl. Truth never die) (1996)
- Buker Vitor Agun (transl. Fire inside the chest) (1997)
- Buk Bhora Bhalobasha (transl. Chest full of love) (1999)
- Borsha Badol (2000)
- Shesh Juddho (transl. The last war) (2002)
- Moha Tandob (2002)
- Ajker Rupban (2005)
- Protibadi Master (transl. Protester Master) (2005)
- Din–The Day (2022)

Director

- Sotter Mrittu Nei (1996)
- Buker Bhitor Agun (1997)
- Borsha Badol (2000)
- Shesh Juddho (2002)
- Protibadi Master (2005)
- Ahare Jibon (2024)
