= Raisul Islam Asad =

Bangladeshi actor

- রাইসুল ইসলাম আসাদ
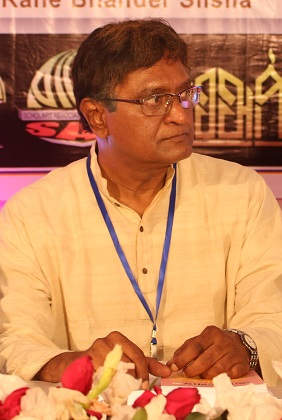
- Asad in 2016
- Born: Asaduzzaman Mohammad Raisul Islam; 15 July 1953 (age 73); Dacca, East Bengal, Pakistan
- Education: Dhaka Collegiate School University of Dhaka
- Years active: 1972–present

Asaduzzaman Mohammad Raisul Islam (known as Raisul Islam Asad; born 15 July 1953) is a Bangladeshi freedom fighter and an actor in radio, theatre, television and film. He won Bangladesh National Film Award for Best Actor four times for his roles in the films Padma Nadir Majhi (1992), Anya Jibon (1995), Dukhai (1997) and Lalsalu (2001). Besides, he won Best Supporting Actor award twice for the roles in Ghani: The Cycle (2006) and Mrittika Maya (2013). As of 2016, he acted in more than 50 films. He was a member of the Crack Platoon an elite urban guerrilla, intelligence and commando unit of the Mukti Bahini.

== Early life and career ==
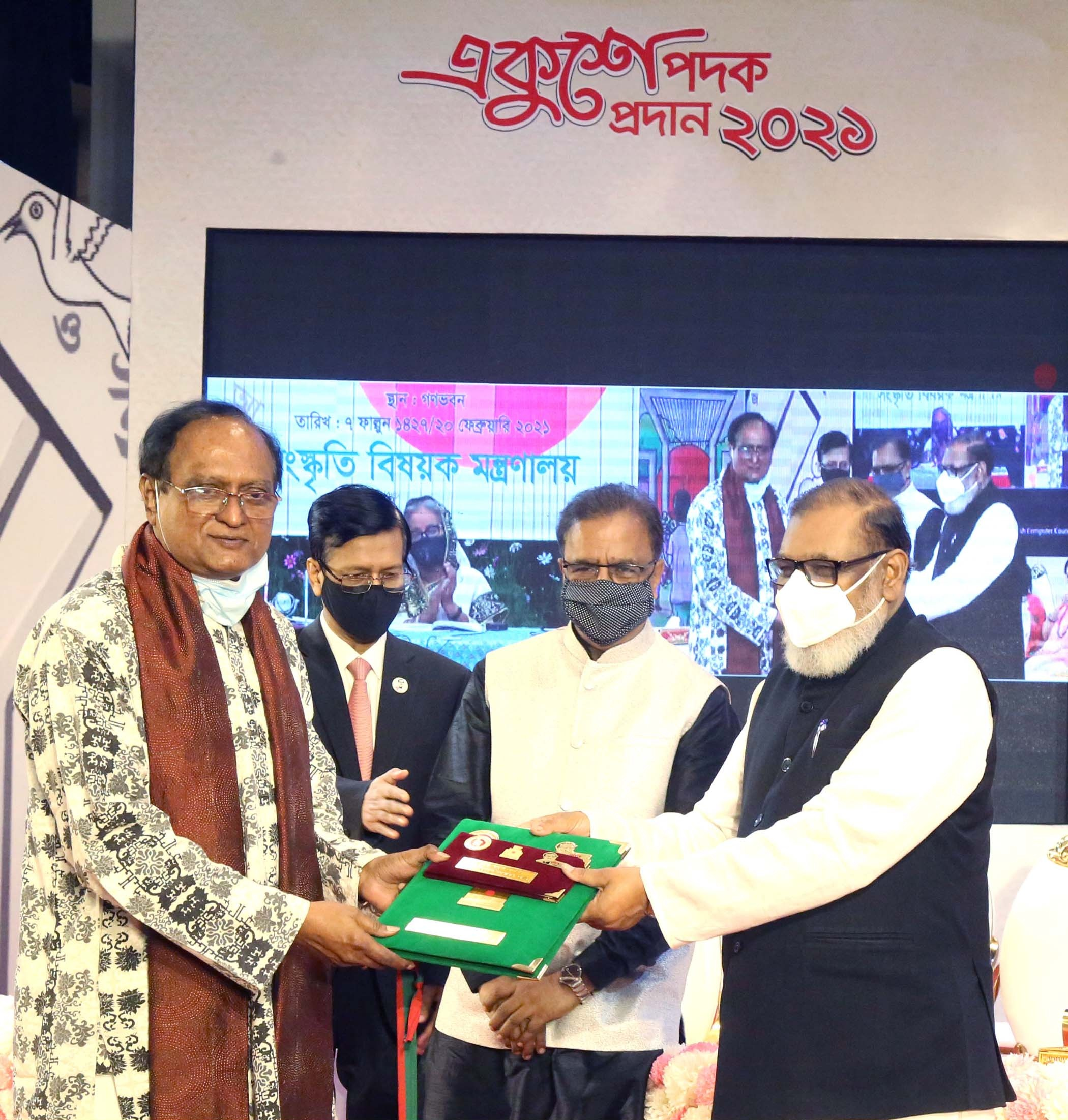
Asad receives Ekushey Padak 2021.

Asad studied in Dhaka Collegiate School. He completed his bachelor's degree and masters in sociology from the University of Dhaka. In 1972, Asad debuted in acting through his roles on the stage dramas Ami Raja Hobo Na and Shorpo Bishoyok Golpo on the same day. His first acted feature film was Abar Tora Manush Ho (1973) directed by Khan Ataur Rahman.

As a Freedom Fighter he received Rahe Bhander Ennoble Award in 2016.

== Personal life ==
Asad married Tahira Dil Afroz in 1979. Together they have a daughter, Rubaina Zaman. He has a sister named Nurjahan.

== Filmography ==
- Abar Tora Manush Ho (1973)
- Ghuddi (1980)
- Suruj Miah (1985)
- Padma Nadir Majhi (1992)
- Patang (1993)
- Nodir Naam Modhumoti (1996)
- Anya Jibon (1995)
- Sotter Mrittu Nei (1996)
- Dukhai (1997)
- Lal Darja (1997)
- Hothat Brishti (1998)
- Kittonkhola (2000)
- Lalsalu (2001)
- Adhiar (2003)
- Lalon (2004)
- Duratta (2006)
- Moner Manush (2010)
- Amar Bondhu Rashed (2011)
- Kaler Putul (2018)
- Amra Ekta Cinema Banabo (2019)
- Mission Extreme (2021)
- Adam (2023)
- Mujib: The Making of a Nation (2023)†
