= Dolly Johur =

Bangladeshi actress

- ডলি জহুর
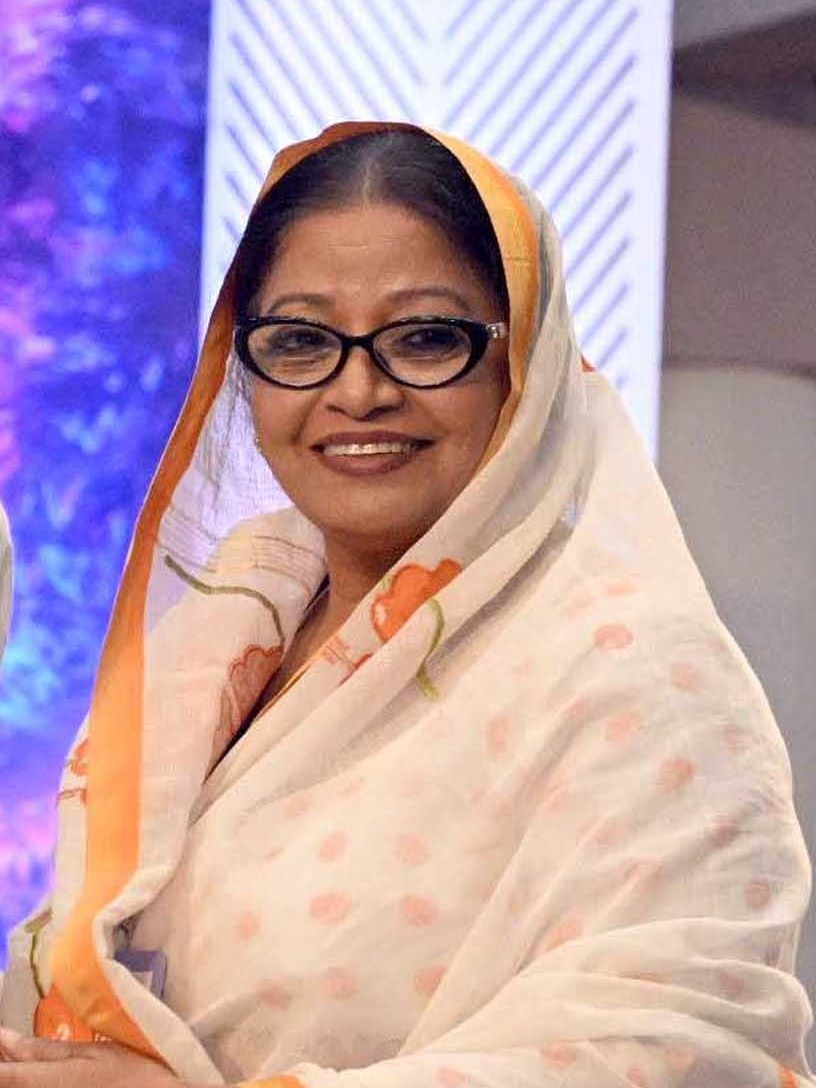
- Dolly Johur in 2023
- Born: 13 July 1953 (age 73); Dacca, East Bengal, Dominion of Pakistan
- Education: University of Dhaka
- Occupation: Actress
- Years active: 1985–present
- Spouse: Johurul Islam (m. 1976; death 2006)
- Children: 1
- Awards: Ekushey Padak (2024)

Dolly Johur (born 17 July 1953) is a Bangladeshi film, television and stage actress. She earned Bangladesh National Film Awards –Lifetime Achievement (2021), Best Actress for her role in Shonkhonil Karagar (1992) and the Best Supporting Actress for Ghani (2006). In 2024, she was awarded the Ekushey Padak, the second highest civilian award in the acting category. Starting in the 1980s, she acted in total 161 films (as of August 2025).

== Early life and education ==
Dolly Johur was born on 17 July 1953 in Dhanmondi, Dacca in the then East Bengal, Dominion of Pakistan to Mofizul Islam, a government service holder and Maleka Banu. Johur began acting at a very young age. Her brother took her try out for different acting jobs when they were young. She started acting on stage around 1974-75 while studying at the University of Dhaka. During that time, she was enrolled at Natyachakra and Chhayanaut. Her notable stage performances include Sandhya Rani in Manush, Mayur Singhasan and Iblish.

== Career ==
Johur got her television breakthrough by the character Nilu in the drama serial Ei Shob Din Ratri by Humayun Ahmed. She went one to play numerous television dramas on Maasranga Television, ATN Bangla and BTV.

Johur made her debut in film acting through Shonkhonil Karagar (1992), which earned her first National Film Award for Best Actress.

== Personal life ==
In 1976, Dolly Johur married actor Johurul Islam (d. 2006). Their son, Riasat, born in 1985, lives in Australia.

== Works ==
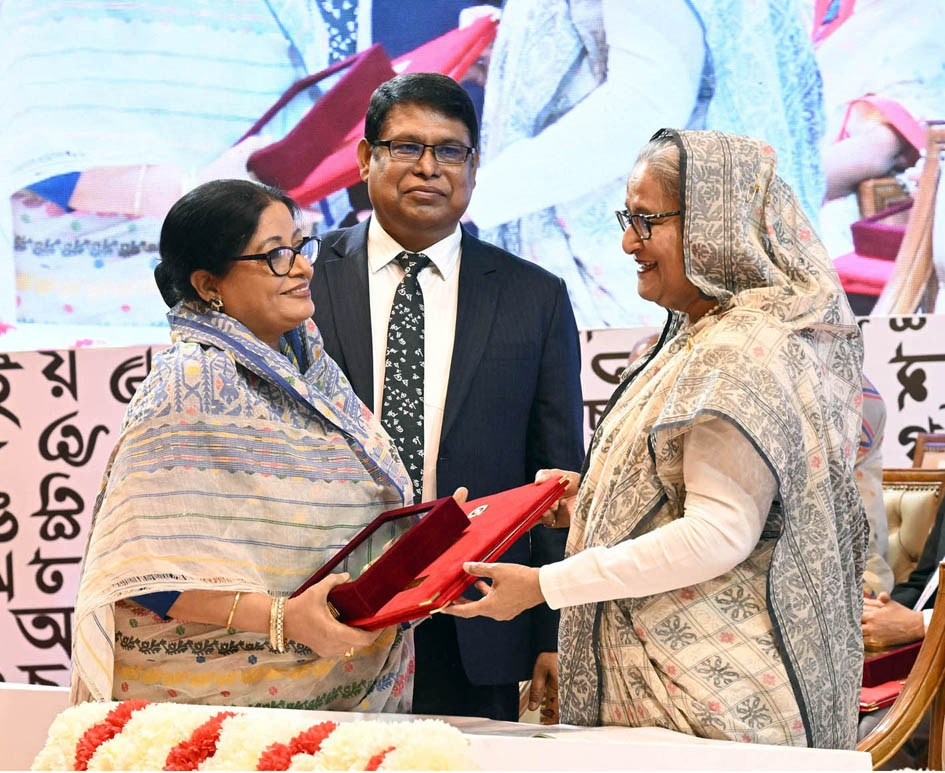
Jahur receives Ekushey Padak from Sheikh Hasina in 2024.

=== Television ===
- Ei Shob Din Ratri (1985)
- Atimanab (2007)
- Joge Biyoge (2007)
- Tuntuni Villa (2008)
- Meghe Dhaka Shohor (2018)

=== Films ===
- Shonkhonil Karagar (1992)
- Aguner Poroshmoni (1995)
- Shopner Thikana (1995)
- Dipu Number Two (1996)
- Shudhu Tumi (1997)
- Anondo Osru (1997)
- Wrong Number (2004)
- Nirontor (2006)
- Ghani (2006)
- Daruchini Dwip (2007)
- Dui Prithibi (2015)
- Domm: Until The Last Breath † (2026)

=== Stage dramas ===
- Manush (2003)
- Noashal (2014)
- Shesher Ratri (2015)
