= Riaz filmography =

List of films

Riaz Uddin Ahamed Siddique (Bengali: রিয়াজ), better known as Riaz, is a Bangladeshi film actor, producer, and television presenter. Through his career in Bengali films (Dhallywood), Riaz has established himself as one of the most popular actors of Bangladeshi cinema. He has appeared in more than 100 Bengali films in genres ranging from romance to action and comedy. He is the recipient of numerous awards including three National Film Awards and seven Meril Prothom Alo Awards.

Riaz first appeared on screen as a side-role hero in filmmaker Dewan Nazrul's social action drama film Banglar Nayok (1995). He began a full-time career in films with a leading role in the highly successful romantic drama Praner Cheye Priyo (1997). In 2005, Riaz worked with Bollywood actress Susmita Sen for Mahesh Manjrekars film It Was Raining That Night. His last-released movie Mujib: The Making of a Nation was released on 13 October 2023. It was directed by late veteran director Shyam Benegal.

== Film career ==
Early in his career, Riaz played romantic roles in films such as Praner Cheye Priyo and Hridoyer Aina (1997); Kajer Meye, Prithibi Tomar Amar and Bhalobasi Tomake (1998); Biyer Phul and Narir Mon (1999); E Badhon Jabena Chire, Nishwase Tumi Biswase Tumi, and Bhownkor Bishu (2000); Hridoyer Bandhon and In 2002, he received his third Meril-Prothom Alo Award for Best Actor with Shahadat Hossain Liton's romance O Priya Tumi Kothay co-starring Shakib Khan for the first time; Premer Taj Mahal (2002); Moner Majhe Tumi (2003); Wrong Number (2004); Hridoyer Kotha (2006); and Akash Chhoa Bhalobasa (2008).

Riaz has also acted in literature-based films. He received wide critical acclaim for Dui Duari (2000); Shasti: Punishment, Megher Pore Megh: Clouds After Cloud, and Shyamol Chhaya: The Green Shadow (2004); Hajar Bachhor Dhore: Symphony of Agony (2005); Bidrohi Padma and Khelaghar: Dollhouse (2006); Daruchini Dip and Ekjon Songe Chhilo (2007); Megher Koley Rod: Sunshine In The Clouds, Ki Jadu Korila, and Chandra Grohon: The Lunar Eclipse (2008); and Ebadat: The Worship (2009) and Modhumoti (2011).

== Filmography ==
Year	Film	Role	Notes
1995	Banglar Nayok	Munna	Debut film
1996	Ojante	Mirza Ashik	
1996	Priyojon	Sumon	
1996	Bachar Lorai	Raju	
1996	Mithyar Mrittu	Raju	
1997	Praner Cheye Priyo	Anik / Rony	Best Actor Meril Prothom Alo Awards
1997	Hridoyer Ayna	Hridoy	
1997	Prithibi Amare Chay Na	Sagor	
1997	Mon Mane Na	Sagor	
1997	Tumi Sudhu Tumi	Sagor	
1997	Bhalobashi Tomake	Anik	
1997	E Jibon Tomar Amar	Prithibi	
1998	Buk Bhora Bhalobasha	Sagor	
1998	Bidrohi Charidike	Anik / Biplob	
1998	Prithibi Tomar Amar	Shaon	
1998	Kajer Meye	Sagor	
1998	Swapner Purush	Noor	
1998	Biyer Phul	Sagor	
1998	Asha Amar Asha	Jadu	
1998	Tomar Jonno Pagol	Jibon	
2000	Narir Mon	Akash	
2000	Dui Duari	Mystery Man	Best Actor National Film Awards
2000	E Badhon Jabena Chhire	Badhon	
2000	Sabdhan	Khoka / Sultan	
2000	Noyoner Noyon	Gahor	
2000	Mone Rekho Amay	Sagor	
2000	Bhoyonkar Bishu	Surjo	
2000	Ei Mon Chai Je..!	Shamim	
2001	Khobordar	Anik	
2001	Karishma	Moni	
2001	Mayer Somman	Biplob	
2001	Dalopati	Shahid	
2001	Ami Tomari	Sagor	
2001	Iblish	Golam E-Mostafa	
2001	Dhawa	Riaz Ahmed	
2001	Hridoye Lekha Naam	Sagor	
2001	Shoshurbari Zindabad	Badhon	Best Actor Meril Prothom Alo Awards
2001	Kothin Bastob	Rasha	
2002	Hridoyer Bandhon	Akash	
2002	Mone Pore Tomake	Raj	
2002	Premer Taj Mahal	Robin	Best Actor Meril Prothom Alo Awards
2002	Khepa Basu	Sagar	
2002	Eri Naam Dosti: Ties Never Die	Raju	
2002	Nishwase Tumi Bishwase Tumi	Apon	
2002	Sundori Bodhu	Babu	
2002	Bhalobashar Shotru	Raju	
2002	Oder Dhor	Rashed	
2002	Bostir Meye	Jony	
2002	Milon Hobe Koto Dine	Parosh	
2002	Ontore Jhor	Major Shadhin	
2002	O Priya Tumi Kothay	Sagor	
2002	Bhalobasha Kare Koy	Shuvo	Best Actor BFPDA Film Awards
2003	Mon	Noyon	
2003	Moner Majhe Tumi	Sentu / Benu	Indo-Bangladesh joint production; Best Actor Meril Prothom Alo Awards
2003	Lal Doria	Sagor	
2003	Gundar Prem	Anik	
2003	Matir Phul	Mati	
2003	Jamai Shoshur	Farhad Khan	
2003	Nashiman	Raj Kumar Alam	
2003	Swapner Bashor	Sagor	
2004	Megher Pore Megh	Majid	
2004	Wrong Number	Abir	
2004	Swapner Bhalobasha	Badhon	
2004	Tok Jhal Mishti	Raja	
2004	Noshto	Biplob	
2004	Shyamol Chhaya	Moslem Munsi	
2004	Shasti	Chhidam	Best Actor (Critics) Meril Prothom Alo Awards
2004	Prem Korechi Besh Korechi	Raj	
2005	Bishakto Chok: The Blue Eye	Nobin	
2005	Hajar Bachhor Dhore	Montu	Best Actor (Critics) Meril Prothom Alo Awards
2005	Chotto Ektu Bhalobasha	Sagor	
2005	Badha	Akash	
2005	Taka: The Ultimate Magic	Shanta / Drubalok	
2005	Bhalobasha Bhalobasha	Jibon	
2005	It Was Raining That Night	Vijay Kumar Dixit / Zaffar Khan	
2005	Molla Barir Bou	Joan Gazi	
2006	Bokul Phuler Mala	Bokul	
2006	Maleka Sundori	Ali	
2006	Hridoyer Kotha	Anik	Best Actor Meril Prothom Alo Awards
2006	Khelaghor: Dollhouse	Yakub	Best Actor BFFS Film Awards
2006	Bidrohi Padma	Raju	
2006	Na Bolona	Antor	
2006	Dui Noyoner Alo	Special Appearance	
2007	Biyer Logon	Sagar	
2007	Dhoni Goriber Prem	Akash	
2007	Daruchini Dwip	Shuvro	Best Actor National Film Awards
2007	Tumi Koto Sundor	Noyon	
2007	Jiboner Cheye Dami	Jibon	
2007	Meye Sakkhi	Sabur Talukder	
2007	Ekjon Shonge Chilo	Monsur	
2008	Sathi Tumi Kar	Raja	
2008	Tomakei Khujchi	Akash	
2008	Megher Koley Rod	Udoy	
2008	Ki Jadu Korila	Sagor	Best Actor National Film Awards
2008	Akash Chhoa Bhalobasa	Akash	Nomination- Best Actor Meril Prothom Alo Awards
2008	Chandragrohon	Kashu	
2009	Ke Ami: Who Am I	Akash	
2009	Tumi Amar Swami	Rawnak Chowdhury	
2009	Shubho Bibaho	Arman	
2009	Mon Boshena Porar Table E	Akash	
2009	Ebadot	Khoka	
2009	Chirodin Ami Tomar	Anik	
2009	Mon Chuyeche Mon	Akash	
2009	Chader Moto Bou	Sagor	
2009	Bodhu Tumi Kar	Maruf	
2009	Bhalobeshe Bou Anbo	Zahid Arman	
2010	Jomidaar	Raju	
2010	Bajao Biyer Bajna	Rajib	
2010	Hridoy Ache Jaar		Incomplete initiative
2011	Modhumati	Abu	
2011	Dui Purush	Shuvro	
2011	Kusum Kusum Prem	Badol	
2011	Bondhu Tumi Amar	Manik	
2011	Ke Apon Ke Por	Special Appearance	
2013	Shiri Forhad	Forhad	
2014	Lobhe Paap, Paape Mrittu	Sagor Chowdhury	
2015	Sweetheart	Richard	
2015	Krishnopokkho	Muhib	
2015	Jonom Jonome		
2022	Operation Sundarbans	Ishtiak Ahmed	
2023	Radio	Sheikh Mujibur Rahman	
2023	Mujib: The Making of a Nation	Tajuddin Ahmed	

== Television ==
=== As an actor ===
Title	Director	Co-stars	Notes
Ognibolaka	Abdullah Rana	Tareen	Docu-drama
Hablonger Bazaar	Humayun Ahmed	Meher Afroz Shaon	Guest Appearance
Urey Jai Bok Pokkhi	Humayun Ahmed	Meher Afroz Shaon	Mega serial
Ogo Bodhu Sundori		Purnima	Eid Special Telefilm
Rohasya	Meher Afroz Shawon	Meher Afroz Shawon	Short drama
Jamunar Jol Dekhte Kalo	Humayun Ahmed	Meher Afroz Shaon	Special drama
Badol Diner Prothom Kodom Ful	Humayun Ahmed	Meher Afroz Shaon	Special drama
Ei Borshai	Humayun Ahmed	Meher Afroz Shaon	Special drama
Agnee Balaka	Abdullah Rana	Tareen	Docu-drama
Amra Tinjon	Humayun Ahmed	Meher Afroz Shaon	Short drama
Swapner Shuru	Raihan Khan	Tareen	Special Telefilm
Bhalobasha Chhuye Gelo			Short drama
Tulite Anka Swapno	S. A. Haque Olike	Shrabanti	Special Telefilm
Naya Riksha	Humayn Ahmed	Meher Afroz Shaon	Short drama
Paromitar Din-Ratri	Bulbul Ahmed	Oindrila	Special Telefilm
Mem Saheb	S. A. Haque Olike	Popy	Special Telefilm
Amader Nurulhuda	Mahfuz Ahmed	Richi Solaiman	Mega Serial
Moner Modhye Akash	Shanta Islam	Riya	Special Telefilm
Road To Success	Alvi Ahmed	Moutusi and Kusum Sikder	Short drama
Ponditer Mela	Mohammad Kamrul Islam	Mim Bidya Sinha Saha	Short drama
Aveesar			Special Telefilm
Chicken Tikka Masala	S. A. Haque Olike	Sarika	Eid Special Telefilm
Bhalobasa Bhalobasi	S. A. Haque Olike	Sarika	Special Telefilm
Tukro Megher Golpo	S A Haque Olike	Zakia Bari Momo	
Dwidha Dando O Bhalobasha	Abir Khan	Nipun	
Chor	Humayun Ahmed	Bindu	
Ami Aj Bhejabo Chokh Samudro Joley	Humayun Ahmed	Meher Afroz Shaon	
Aporanher Golpo	Sajjad Sumon	Farhana Mily	Special Telefilm
Probhat Feri	S. M. Ripon and Bodiur Rahman Sohel		Special drama
Project Traffic Jam	Jewel Rana	Sohana Saba	Short drama
Bhalobasar Ek Fota Jol	Mohon Khan	Romana	Special Telefilm
Gangchiler Thikana	Mohon Khan	Romana	Special Telefilm
Ek Bochhor Porer Sondha	Sakal Ahmed	Nusrat Imrose Tisha	Special drama
Golpey Golpey Bhalobasa	Sumon Dhaar	Nusrat Imrose Tisha	Eid Special Telefilm
Nazrul	Ferdous Hasan	Namira	Special drama
Superstar	Arif-E-Ahnaf	Nipun	Special drama
Chhayabritter Rajkanya	Sumon Anowar	Nusrat Imrose Tisha	Special drama
Sundoritoma	Sakal Ahmed	Nusrat Imrose Tisha	Eid Special Telefilm
Ekti Phul Ekti Bhool	Mohon Khan	Bhabna	Eid Special Telefilm
Shubhagomon	Shahidunnabi	Nipun	Eid Special drama
Ki Sundor Ondhokar	Ferdous Hasan	Sumaiya Shimu	Eid Special Telefilm
Confusion	Abeer Khan	Nipun	Eid Special drama
Baji	Sakal Ahmed	Nusrat Imrose Tisha	Eid Special drama
Don't Touch Me	Arif Rahman	Mohona Meem	Eid Special Telefilm
Sugar Free Chocolate Cake	Shahid-Ud-Nabi	Tina and Prosun Azad	Eid Special drama
Nir	Sakal Ahmed	Nusrat Imrose Tisha	Eid Special drama
72 Kakrail	Sakal Ahmed	Nusrat Imrose Tisha	Eid Special drama
Golpota Golpo Chhilona	Sakal Ahmed	Nadia	Eid Special drama
Ebong Nil Canvas	Rayhan Khan	Nusrat Imrose Tisha	Eid Special drama
Spy Agency	Shahid-un-Nabi	Bijori Barkatullah	Eid Special drama (6 Episode)
Community Clinic	Syed Awlad	Shashi	Documentary
Cycle Balika	Tuhin Hosaain	Shaila Sabi	Special drama
Trust Me Man	Sagar Ahmed Durjoy	Purnima	Special drama
Tobuo Tumi Amar	Himel Ashraf	Popy	Special drama
Ice Cream O Anubhuti	Kaysar Ahmed	Bandhan	Special drama
Bijoy Gantha	Azad Kalam	Trisha	
Tumi Achho Tumi Nai	Sakal Ahmed	Nusrat Imrose Tisha	Valentine special drama
Bibhram	Shaown Ahmed	Sonia	special drama
Lathipagal	Salauddin Lavlu		Mega-series
Shanibarer Chor	Shamim Shahed	Nipun	Eid special drama
Ujan Ganger Naiya	Bashar Jarjis	Farhana Mily	Mega-series
Pushpo...Tomar Opekshay	Rayhan Khan	Nova	Valentine special drama
Kathgolaper Shunyata	Minhazul Islam Ovi	Ishana	Valentine special drama
Dwidha	Sakal Ahmed	Zakia Bai Mamo	Eid special drama
Shesh Prishthar Golpo	Hridoy	Mehjabin Chowdhury	Valentine special drama
Life Is Beautiful	Munira Yousuf Memy	Nadia Afrin	Special telifilm

=== Web series ===
Year	Title	OTT	Character	Co-Artist	Director	Notes
2019	Garden Game	Bioscope	Shahin	Popy, Nipun	Towhid Mitul	

=== As a host ===
- Meril Prothom Alo Awards - 2007 (with Ferdous Ahmed)
- Nirman-er Taraka - 2009-2010 (with Mushfika Tina)
- Nirman-er Taraka (Eid Special) - 2010 (with Mushfika Tina)
- Purti Utsab Tarar Mela - 2011 (with Moushumi)
- National Film Awards 2010 - 2012 (with Moushumi)

== See also ==
- Dhallywood
- Bangladeshi film actor
- Cinema of Bangladesh
