= List of awards and nominations received by Riaz =

Riaz awards and nominations
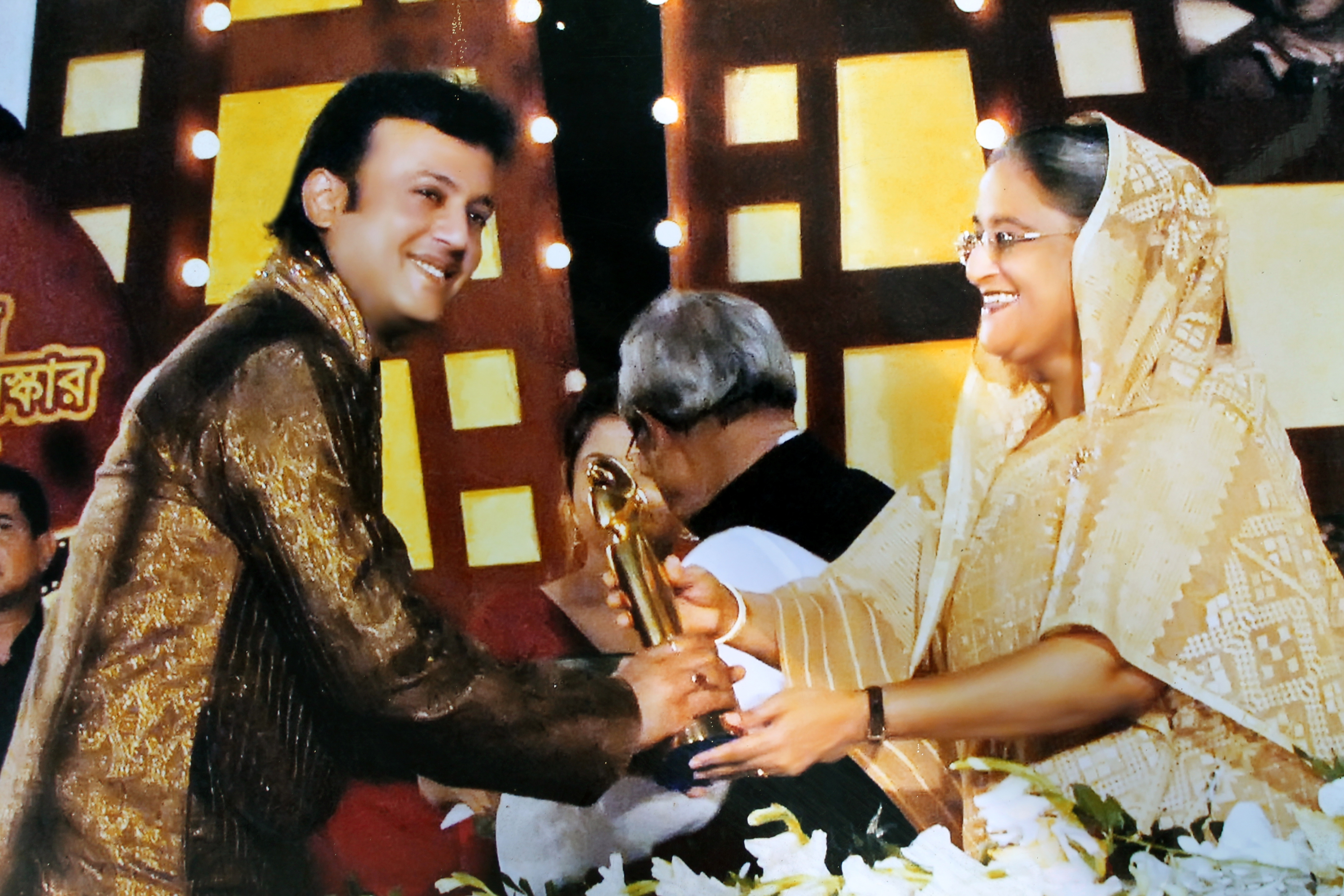
- Riaz Receiving National Award 2008 from Prime minister Sheikh Hasina in 2010.
Awards and nominations
Award	Wins	Nominations

Totals (Note: Certain award groups do not simply award one winner. They acknowledge several different recipients, have runners-up, and have third place. Since this is a specific recognition and is different from losing an award, runner-up mentions are considered wins in this award tally. For simplification and to avoid errors, each award in this list has been presumed to have had a prior nomination.)
- Wins: 17
- Nominations: 14

Riaz Uddin Ahamed Siddique (Bengali: রিয়াজ; better known as Riaz) is a Bangladeshi film actor, producer, model and television presenter. Through his successful career in Bengali films (Dhallywood), Riaz has established himself as one of the most popular actors of Bangladeshi cinema, he has appeared in more than 100 Bengali films in genres ranging from romance to action and comedies. He is the recipient of numerous achievements, including three National Film Awards and seven Meril Prothom Alo Awards.

== Awards and nominations ==
Riaz has received three National Film Awards for his unique contribution in the Bangladesh film industry. Acting for the films Dui Duari ( 2000) by Humayun Ahmed, Daruchini Dwip (2007) by Tauquir Ahmed and Ki Jadu Korila (2008) by Chandan Chowdhury.

=== National Film Awards ===
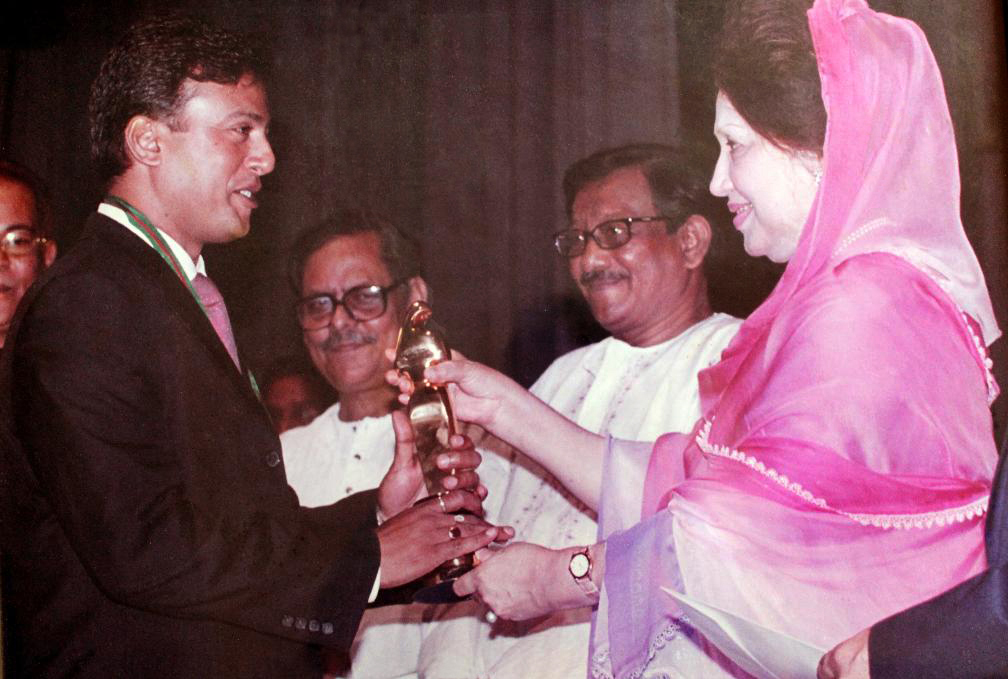
Riaz receiving National Award 2000 from Prime Minister Khaleda Zia in 2002

Winner

- Best Actor for Dui Duari - 2000
- Best Actor for Daruchini Diwp - 2007
- Best Actor for Ki Jadu Korila - 2008

Nomination

- Best Actor for Modhumoti - 2011

=== Meril Prothom Alo Awards ===
Winner

- Best Actor for Praner Cheye Priyo - 1998
- Best Actor for Shoshurbari Zindabad - 2001
- Best Actor for Premer Taj Mahal - 2002
- Best Actor for Moner Majhe Tumi - 2003
- Best Actor for (Critiks) Shasti: Punishment - 2004
- Best Actor (Critiks) Hajar Bachhor Dhore: Symphony of Agony - 2005
- Best Actor for Hridoyer Kotha - 2006

Nomination

- Best Film Actor - 1999
- Best Film Actor - 2000
- Best Film Actor - 2007
- Best Film Actor - 2008 Akash Chhoa Bhalobasa
- Best Film Actor - 2009
- Best Film Actor - 2010
- Best Film Actor - 2011
- Best Film Actor - 2012

== Other awards ==
=== CJFC Awards ===
Winner

- Best Film Actor - 1998

=== Lux Channel I Performance Awards ===
Winner

- Best Film Actor - 2003 (Dubai)
- Best Film Actor - 2005

=== Bangla TV Best Performance Awards ===
Winner

- Best Film Actor - 2003 (London)

=== Dhallywood Film and Music Awards ===
Winner

- Best Film Actor - 2002 (New York)
- Best Film Actor - 2003 (New York)

=== Diamond World Channel I Best Awards ===
Nominated

- Best Film Actor - 2011

== See also ==
- Bangladeshi film actor
- Cinema of Bangladesh
