= Ahmed Imtiaz Bulbul discography =

Ahmed Imtiaz Bulbul (1956–2019) was a Bangladeshi music director and lyricist. He composed for 195 films in his career, the most among all Bangladeshi composers, followed by Alam Khan (196). The following is a list of films he scored and wrote lyrics for:

== 1970s ==
Year	Film	Notes
1979	Nagordola	composed along with Alauddin Ali

== 1980s ==
Year	Film	Notes
1982	Kajol Lota	
1983	Megh Bijli Badol	
1984	Chandan Dwiper Rajkanya	
1984	Noyoner Alo	
1985	Amanat	
1985	Pagli	
1985	Shot Bhai	
1985	Soti Nag Konya	
1986	Akhi Milon	
1986	Mohammad Ali	
1986	Nobab	
1986	Ogo Bideshini	
1986	Rakhal Bandhu	
1986	Touba	
1987	Bosonto Maloti	
1987	Dayi Ke?	
1987	Lobh Lalosa	
1987	Lokkhi Bodhu	
1987	Sohojatri	
1988	Duniya	
1988	Hisab Chai	
1988	Jibon Dhara	
1988	Jontrona	
1989	Abujh Hridoy	
1989	Alal Dulal	
1989	Jolpori	
1989	Nikah	
1989	Sakkhi Proman	

== 1990s ==
Year	Film	Notes
1990	Criminal	
1990	Soti Putro Abdullah	
1991	Danga	
1991	Kashem Malar Prem	
1991	Lawarish	
1991	Moroner Pore	
1992	Amar Jaan	
1992	Bondhon	
1992	Danga	
1992	Lokkhir Songsar	
1992	Radha Krishno	
1993	Abujh Duti Mon	
1993	Akheri Hamla	
1993	Andho Prem	
1993	Antor Jala	
1993	Jyoti	
1994	Bikkhov	
1994	Desh Premik	composed along with Azad Rahman
1994	Mohot	
1994	Prem Juddho	
1994	Shason	
1994	Sipahi	
1995	Andolon	
1995	Atto Ohongkar	
1995	Banglar Commando	
1995	Bir Sontan	
1995	Hingsa	
1995	Hulia	
1995	Love Story	
1995	Mohamilon	
1995	Muktir Songram	
1995	Shilpi	
1996	Amar Antore Tumi	
1996	Baghini Konya	
1996	Bashira	
1996	Chaowa Theke Paowa	
1996	Mayer Adhikar	
1996	Sukher Ghore Dukkher Agun	
1996	Tomake Chai	
1997	Andho Bhalobasha	
1997	Anondo Osru	
1997	Kal Naginir Prem	
1997	Luttoraj	
1997	Mon Mane Na	
1997	Praner Cheye Priyo	
1998	Anek Diner Asha	
1998	Banglar Bodhu	composed along with Anupam Dutta
1998	Bhalobashi Tomake	
1998	Bidrohi Sontan	
1998	Bidroho Charidike	
1998	Dui Rongbaz	composed along with Alauddin Ali
1998	Maa Jokhon Bicharok	
1998	Matribhumi	
1998	Mayer Kosom	
1998	Mukti Chai	
1998	Ranga Bou	
1998	Sukher Ashay	
1998	Teji	
1999	Ami Tomari	
1999	Ammajan	
1999	Bhulona Amay	
1999	Biyer Phul	
1999	Dhor	
1999	Jobordokhol	
1999	Jor	
1999	Kajer Meye	
1999	Khamosh	
1999	Love in Bangkok	
1999	Moner Milon	
1999	Noyoner Kajol	
1999	Ononto Bhalobasha	

== 2000s ==
Year	Film	Notes
2000	Aaj Gaye Holud	
2000	Bishakto Nagin	
2000	Bortoman	
2000	Heera Chuni Panna	composed alongside Abu Taher
2000	Jokhom	
2000	Jhor	
2000	Kata Rifle	
2000	Killer	
2000	Lady Rongbaz	
2000	Narir Mon	
2000	Sabdhan	
2001	Abbajan	
2001	Dhaoa	
2001	Dushmon Dorodi	
2001	Gono Dushmon	
2001	Krodh	
2001	Mukhomukhi	
2001	Panja	
2001	Premer Jaala	
2001	Tandob Lila	
2002	Ashanto Agun	
2002	Bhalobashar Shotru	
2002	Bhoy	
2002	Bipodjonok	
2002	Dhakaiya Mastan	
2002	Direct Action	
2002	Dolpoti	
2002	Fire	
2002	Itihaash	
2002	Khawto Bikkhawto	
2002	Mayer Somman	
2002	Porena Chokher Polok	
2002	Premer Taj Mahal	Winner: Bangladesh National Film Award for Best Music Director
2002	Phool Nebo Na Osru Nebo	
2002	Somajke Bodle Dao	
2003	Andhokar	
2003	Bou Shashurir Juddho	
2003	Jwolonto Bisforon	
2003	Minister	
2003	Mon	
2003	Prem Sanghat	
2004	Lutpat	
2004	Mohora	
2004	Nishiddho Nari	
2004	Prem Keno Kanday	
2004	Tumi Boro Bhagyoboti	
2004	Wrong Number	
2005	Amar Swapno Tumi	
2005	Badha	
2005	Bolona Bhalobashi	
2005	Dui Noyoner Alo	
2005	Hajar Bochhor Dhore	
2005	Meher Nigar	
2005	Norok	
2006	Bhalobasha Bhalobasha	
2006	Jonmo	
2006	Na Bolona	
2006	Sathi Tumi Kar?	
2006	Tokair Hate Astro Keno	
2007	Biyan Sab	
2007	Kopal	
2007	Kabinnama	
2007	Kothin Prem	
2007	Maa Amar Swargo	
2007	Maa Amar Behesht	
2008	Abujh Shishu	
2008	Biyer Prostab	
2008	Chhoto Bon	
2008	Eri Naam Bhalobasha	
2008	Mone Prane Acho Tumi	composed along with Emon Saha
2008	Sontan Amar Ohongkar	
2008	Sontan Amar Sontan	
2008	Tumi Shopno Tumi Sadhana	
2009	Chander Moto Bou	
2009	Guru Bhai	
2009	Miya Barir Chakor	

== 2010s ==
Year	Film	Notes
2010	Bajao Biyer Bajna	
2011	Amar Prithibi Tumi	composed along with
2011	Matir Thikana	composed along with Emon Saha
2011	Anko	
2012	Jiddi Bou	
2012	Raja Surjo Kha	
2013	Pora Mon	
2014	Dobir Saheber Songsar	
2014	Duti Moner Paglami	
2015	Podmo Patar Jol	
2016	Angaar	
2017	Ohongkar	

== 2020s ==
Year	Film	Notes

== Year unknown ==
Film	Notes
Rajkumari	
Anyayer Protibad	
Duniya	
Jonmoshotru	

== Background score only ==
Year	Film	Composer	Notes
1995	Shilpi	Subal Das	
2004	Ek Khondo Jomi	Shahbuddin Nagri	
2010	Bhalobaslei Ghor Bandha Jay Na	Ali Akram Shuvo	Winner: Bangladesh National Film Award for Best Music Composer

== Non-film albums ==
Year	Album	Songs	Lyricist	Artist
N/A	O Majhi Nao Chhaira De	himself		
N/A	Shikari	Kumar Bishwajit		
N/A	Maa Jononi	Kumar Bishwajit		
N/A	Drishti Bhora Brishti	Kumar Bishwajit		
N/A	Abar Keno Pichhu Daako	Monir Khan		
N/A	Bukta Amar Bhanga Bari	Monir Khan		
N/A	Bijoyer Prapti	Sabina Yasmin; Sabbir; Kishore; Kumar Bishwajit; Ayub Bachchu; Bappa Mazumdar		
N/A	Dui Chokhe Dui Nodi	Samina Chowdhury		
N/A	Yeh Dil Tumhi Ko Diya	"Aaye Din Baar"	N/A	Sabina Yasmin

== Songs for television ==
Year	Show	Song	Singer(s)	Writer(s)
1982	Bangladesh Television Independence Day Program	"Sob Kota Janala Khule Daona"	Nazrul Islam Babu	Sabina Yasmin
1982	Bangladesh Television Independence Day Program	"Sundor Suborno Labonno Tarunno"	Nazrul Islam Babu	Sabina Yasmin
1982	Bangladesh Television Independence Day Program	"Bangladesh Amar Bangladesh"	Nazrul Islam Babu	Sabina Yasmin
1982	Bangladesh Television Independence Day Program	"Edesh Amar Sundori Rajkonna"	Nazrul Islam Babu	Sabina Yasmin
1982	Bangladesh Television Independence Day Program	"Aay Aay Aayre Ma"	Nazrul Islam Babu	Sabina Yasmin

== As lyricist ==
Year	Film	Composer(s)	Notes
2009	Prem Koyedi	Ali Akram Shuvo	
2014	Nirbashito	Raja Narayan Deb	
2018	Pagol Manush	Imtiaz Ahmed	
