= List of awards and nominations received by Ahmed Imtiaz Bulbul =

Ahmed Imtiaz Bulbul awards and nominations
Awards and nominations
Award	Wins	Nominations

Totals (Note: Certain award groups do not simply award one winner. They acknowledge several different recipients, have runners-up, and have third place. Since this is a specific recognition and is different from losing an award, runner-up mentions are considered wins in this award tally. For simplification and to avoid errors, each award in this list has been presumed to have had a prior nomination.)
- Wins: 13
- Nominations: 13

Ahmed Imtiaz Bulbul (1956–2019) was a Bangladeshi singer. The following is a list of his accolades:

== Awards ==
Bangladesh National Film Awards

Year	Award	Category	Film	Result
2001	National Film Awards	Best Music Director	Premer Taj Mahal	Won
2005	National Film Awards	Best Music Director	Hajar Bochhor Dhore	Won

Bachsas Awards

Year	Award	Category	Nominated work	Result
1984	Bachsas Awards	Best Lyricist	Noyoner Alo	Won
1995	Bachsas Awards	Best Lyricist	Bhalo Manush	Won
1995	Bachsas Awards	Best Music Director	Love Story	Won
1996	Bachsas Awards	Best Lyricist	Ammajan	Won
1999	Bachsas Awards	Best Lyricist	Anondo Osru	Won
2001	Bachsas Awards	Best Lyricist	Abbajan	Won
2002	Bachsas Awards	Best Lyricist	Premer Taj Mahal	Won
2002	Bachsas Awards	Best Music Director	Itihash	Won

Ifad Film Club Award

Year	Award	Category	Result
2004	Ifad Film Club Award	Best Singer (Female)	Won

11th Channel I Music Awards

- Best Music Director - 2004 won

Ekushey Padak

Year	Field	Result
2010	Entertainment	Won
