= Abdul Kader (actor) =

Bangladeshi actor (c.1951–2020)

- আব্দুল কাদের
- Abdul Kader in 2020
- Born: 1951; Sonarang village, Tongibari Upazila, Munshiganj District
- Died: 26 December 2020 (aged 69); Dhaka, Bangladesh
- Education: University of Dhaka
- Occupations: Actor, model
- Years active: 1974–2020
- Organization(s): Bitopi Group, Bata Bangladesh
- Spouse: Khairun Nesa
- Awards: full list

Abdul Kader (c. 1951 – 26 December 2020) was a Bangladeshi stage and television actor. He was known for playing Bodi in Humayun Ahmed's television series Kothao Keu Nei and for his appearances on the magazine programme Ityadi.

== Early life ==
Kader was born in 1951 in Sonarang, Tongibari thana, Munshiganj District to Abdul Jalil and Anwara Khatun. He started acting after graduating from school. He acted in Rabindranath Tagore's Dakghar as Amal. During 1972–84, for three consecutive years he was the drama secretary of the Mohsin Hall Chhatra Sangsad of University of Dhaka. In the Inter-hall Drama Competition in 1982, he became champion and won an award for his performance for Mohsin Hall's play. He also won an award for his play in Jaundice O Bibidho Baloon written by Selim Al Deen and directed by Nasiruddin Yousuff.

Abdul was a member of the executive council of Daksu Natyachakra until 1975. He was a member of the Theater Natyagasthi since 1983 and was also the joint editor for four years and the general secretary for six years.

== Career ==
Kader's professional career began with teaching. He taught economics at Singair Government College and Louhajang College. After that, worked as an executive in Bitopi Advertising Ltd. He has also been the head of merchandising and retail marketing of multinational footwear and fashion accessory manufacturer and retailer Bata Bangladesh since 1989. He was there for 35 years. Then he joined Bay Emporium Ltd, another retail shoe business in Bangladesh. He was the COO from 2011 to 2015

Kader started acting in television from 1982 and radio drama from 1983. Kader's first serial drama on television was Esho Galper Deshe. Abdul Kader was the vice president of the TV Drama Artiste and Playwright's Association (TENASHINAS) for a long time. He was a regular performer on popular magazine shows. Abdul Kader was popular in dramas, advertisements and films. He became known for his role as Bodi in the serial drama Kothao Keu Nei, directed by Mohammad Barkatullah and written by Humayun Ahmed. After that he would work with Ahmed again in Nokkhotrer Raat. Besides acting, Abdul Kader also acted in several commercials.

== Personal life ==
He was married to Khairun Nesa.

== Works ==
=== Theatre plays ===
Abdul acted in more than a thousand theater works of about 30 productions in his life. Some of his notable plays are:

- Payer Awaz Pawa Jay
- Ekhono Kritodash
- Tomari
- Spordha
- Dui Bon
- Meraj Fokirer Ma

=== Television plays ===
Abdul Kader acted in more than two thousand plays on television. His notable TV plays are:

- Kothao Keu Nei
- Nokkhotrer Raat
- Matir Kole
- Shirsha Bindu
- Sabuj
- Atoshi
- Kushum Kushum Bhalobasha
- Nitu Tomake Bhalobashi
- Amader Choto Nodi
- Dulabhai
- Oggan Party
- Mobaroker Eid
- Bahurupi
- Ei Makeup
- Dhuli Bari
- Saat Goyenda
- Ek Jonomey
- Jal Pore Pata Norey
- Khan Bahadurer Tin Chele

=== Filmography ===
- Wrong Number
- Bhalobasha Zindabad (2013)

== Awards ==
- TENASHINAS Award
- Mahanagari Sanskritik Gosthi Award
- Magician PC Sorcar Award
- Television Audience Forum Award

== Death ==
Kader died of cancer and COVID-19 on 26 December 2020 while undergoing treatment at Evercare Hospital in Dhaka. He was admitted to the hospital on 20 December after returning from treatment at Christian Medical College Vellore, where he remained until his death.
