= Ravina (actress) =

Indian actress

- Born: Kolkata, West Bengal, India
- Occupation: Actress
- Years active: 1997-2002
- Known for: acting
- Notable work: Praner Cheye Priyo

Ravina is an Indian actress who acted in Dhallywood movies. She acted in the 1997 film Praner Cheye Priyo with Riaz. She also appeared in Sabdhan and Dolopoti, again opposite Riaz.

== Selected filmography ==
- Praner Cheye Priyo
- Sabdhan
- Dolopoti
