= Dewan Nazrul =

Bangladeshi Film Director

- দেওয়ান নজরুল
- Born: 3 December 1950 (age 75); Ullapara, Sirajganj District, East Bengal, Dominion of Pakistan
- Education: University of Dhaka
- Occupations: Film director, lyricist, screenplay writer, freedom fighter
- Years active: 1976–present
- Spouse: Shahin Nazrul
- Children: 2
- Awards: Bachsas Awards (lifetime achievement)

Dewan Nazrul is a Bangladeshi film director, lyricist, screenwriter and freedom fighter in the Bangladesh Liberation War.

== Movie direction ==
Dewan Nazrul became involved in filmmaking as an apprentice in Ibn Mizan's movie Nagini Prem. After the independence of Bangladesh in 1974, he acted as the chief assistant director and lyricist in the film Daku Mansur. Since then he has been working as an assistant director in various films. Dewan Nazrul's first film was Asami Hajir as a main director. However, for some reason he could not finish the work of the film. Then in 1976 he started making Dost Dushman film. It was released in 1977. This is the first released film directed by Dewan Nazrul. The film became famous and Dewan Nazrul got a permanent seat as a director in Bengali movie arena. The film successfully depicts a western-style fight. by this film, Jashim became the first action hero of Dhallywood.

== Film ==
Some of the films directed by Dewan Nazrul are:

- Dost Dushman (1977)
- Asami Hajir (1978)
- Barood (1978)
- Johnny (1983)
- Banglar Nayok (1995)
- Qurbani (1985)
- Dhormo Amar Maa (1986)
- Asman Jomin (1990)
- Mastaan Raja (1992)
- Kaliya (1993)
- Matir Durgo (1994)
- Sujon Bondhu (2001)
- Dojokh (2005)

== Song ==
Besides making films, Dewan Nazrul has written many songs. Some of his songs are:

Song	singer	Lyricist	Composer	Movies	Director
Chupi Chupi Bolo kew jene jabea	Khurshid Alam & Runa Laila	Dewan Nazrul	Monsur Ahmed	Nishan	Ibne Mizan
Rupe Amar Agun Jole	Runa Laila	Dewan Nazrul	Monsur Ali	Bahadur	Ibne Mizan
O Sagar Kanyare kacha sonar gaye	Khurshid Alam & Runa Laila	Dewan Nazrul	Monsur Ali	Bahadur	Ibne Mizan
Rail line er oi bostite	Azam Khan	Dewan Nazrul			
Ajke na hoi valobaso	Khurshid Alam	Dewan Nazrul	Alam Khan	Mintu Amar Name	A.J Mintu
Pakhir Basar Moto duti chokh	Khurshid Alam & Runa Laila	Dewan Nazrul	Monsur Ali	Jighang	Ibne Mizan
Dhuniata Mosto Bro khaw dhaw Furti Koro	Andro Kishore	Dewan Nazrul	Alam Khan	Jony	Dewan Nazrul
Amar Prithibi tumi Tomar Prithibi Ami	Ferdus Wahid, Sabina Yasmin	Dewan Nazrul	Alam Khan	Asmani Hajir	Dewan Nazrul
Eak Chor Jhai Chole	Andro kishore	Dewan Nazrul	Alam Khan	Prottiga	A.J Mitnu
Helen Vengeche Troy Nogori	Runa Laila	Dewan Nazrul	Alam Khan	Mintu Amar Nam	A.J Mintu
Nach Amar Moyna Tui Poycha Pabi Re	Khurshid Alam	Dewan Nazrul	Monsur Ali	Eak Mutho Bath	Ibne Mizan
Bole daw matir Prithibi	Arifur Rahman	Dewan Nazrul	Kajal Rashid	Ke Tumi ?	M.S Rahman
Etto Ruper Korish Na	Kurshid Alam & Sabina Yasmin	Dewan Nazrul	Monsulr Ali	Eak mutho Bath	Ibne Mizan
Pream Nagar Pramik Ami mojnu amar nam	Kurshid Alam & Sabina Yasmin	Dewan Nazrul	Alam Khan	Ashami Hajir	Dewan Nazrul
Ki Jadu ache toamr o chokhe	Kurshid Alam & Sabina Yasmin	Dewan Nazrul	Monsur ALi	Bahadur	Ibne Mizan
Amar Priyo jnno ami sob kisu pari	Sabina Yasmin	Dewan Nazrul	Dost Dusmon	Alam Khan	Dewan Nazrul
Eakti Chele aj khun koreche	Runa Laila	Dewan Nazrul	Barud	Alam Khan	Dewan Nazrul
Tumi ekhon amaroi kotha vabcho	Sabina Yasmin	Dewan Nazrul	Jibon Nowka	Alam Khan	Masud Parvez
O shathi re tumi chara valo lage na tumi je amaroi	Andro Kishore	Dewan Nazrul	Alam Khan	Proyojon	Rana Nasher
Nach amar moyna tui poica pabi re	Kurshid Alam	Dewan Nazrul	Monsur Ali	Eak Mutho Bath	Ibne Mizan
Mor shopner dekha sei rajar kumar	Sabina Yasmin & Md.Rofiqul Alam	Dewan Nazrul	Monsur Ahmed	Dakhu Monsur	Ibne Mizan
Ami je rupushi kore vlobashi	Sabina Yasmin	Dewan Nazrul	Monsur Ahmed	Daku Monsur	Ibne Mizan
Mitha lage joto betha dish re kala	Sabina Yasmin	Dewan Nazrul	Monsur Ahmed	Nishan	Ibne Mizan
Prithibi amar vule jhaw	Sayed Abdul Hadi	Dewan Nazrul	Ali Hosen	Kalia	Dewan Nazrul
Buker Majkhane	Andro Kishore & Runa Laila	Dewan Nazrul	Ali Hosen	Kalia	Dewan Nazrul
Amar sobar kushir din	Sayed Abdul Hadi	Dewan Nazrul	Ali Hosen	Kalia	Dewan Nazrul
Bijoynagar Grama	Khurshid Alam Fahim & Sabina Yasmin	Dewan Nazrul	Alam Khan	Dost Dusmon	Dewan Nazrul
Dosto amra dujone	Khurshid Alam Fahim & Sabina Yasmin	Dewan Nazrul	Alam Khan	Dost Dusmon	Dewan Nazrul
Tumi amar jibon tumi amar asha	Andro Kishore & Sabina Yasmin	Dewan Nazrul	Alam Khan	Ajker Hangama	Mohammad Hosen
Chor Ami Daku bolnare	Andro Kishore & Sabina Yasmin	Dewan Nazrul	Alam Khan	Jony	Dewan Nazrul
Prithibi ghumaye acha	Sabina Yasmin	Dewan Nazrul	Alam Khan	Kabin	Alamgir Kumku
Dukho Chara jibon hoyna	Andro Kishore	Dewan Nazrul	Alam Khan	Kabin	Alamgir Kumku

== Awards ==
- Bachsas Award
