= Hridoy Islam =

Bangladeshi film actor

- হৃদয় ইসলাম
- Occupation: Film actor
- Years active: 2005
- Notable work: Taka
- Awards: National Film Award

Hridoy Islam is a Bangladeshi film actor. He won Bangladesh National Film Award for Best Child Artist for the film Taka (2005).

== Career ==
He played as Shakib Khan's friend in Kazi Hayat's fiftieth directorial venture Bir in 2020.

== Selected films ==
- Taka - 2005

== Awards and nominations ==
Year	Award	Category	Film	Result
2005	National Film Award	Best Child Artist	Taka	Won
