= Purnima (Bangladeshi actress) =

Bangladeshi actress

- পূর্ণিমা
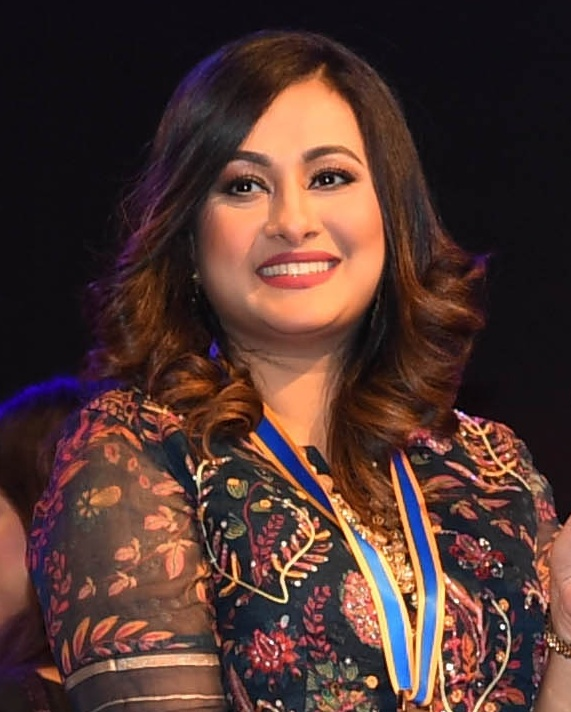
- Purnima in 2023
- Born: Dilara Hanif Rita; 11 July 1981 (age 44); Fatikchhari, Chittagong, Bangladesh
- Occupations: Actress, model
- Years active: 1998–present
- Spouses: Mostaq Kibria (m. 2005; div. 2007) Ahmed Jalal Fahad (m. 2007; div. 2022) Ashfakur Rahman Robin (m. 2022)
- Children: 1
- Awards: full list

Dilara Hanif Rita (Bengali: দিলারা হানিফ রীতা; born 11 July 1981), known by her stage name Purnima, is a Bangladeshi film actress. Her notable films include "Moner Majhe Tumi" (2003), "Megher Pore Megh" (2004), "Shuva" (2005), "Hridoyer Kotha" (2006), and "Akash Chonya Valobasha" (2008). She won the Bangladesh National Film Award for Best Actress in 2010.

She continued to act in films as a lead actress after her debut. Initially, her career was not successful, as many of her films were flops, including Modhu Purnima, Seyana Pagol, Tumi Je Amar, and Jibon Chabi.

Her career finally surged with the successful movie Mastaner Upor Mastan, which became the highest grosser of the 2000s until 2008, and the National Award-winning film Meghla Akash. With the movie Moner Majhe Tumi, Purnima rapidly became a successful leading actress of Dhallywood and her success continued with her most prominent movie partner Riaz. Her other notable films include Ajker Somaj, Ajker Dapot, Bhalobashar Lal Golap, Nishashe Tumi Bishashe Tumi, Tok Jhal Misti, Meyer Jonno Pagol, Bidrohi Salauddin, Bastob, Amar Shopno, Biyer Prostab, Ma Amar Shorgo, Sobai To Bhalobasha Chai , Ke Ami, Sokhi Tumi Kar, Tomakey Khujchi, Mone Rekho Amai, Bondhu Tumi Amar, Khobordar, and Pita Matar Amanat.

== Early life ==
Purnima was born in 1981 in Fatikchhari, Chittagong. Her parents are Mohammad Hanif and Sufia Begum. She has one sister Dilruba Hanif. She is also an actress. She lost her dad at a young age.

== Career ==
Purnima made her film debut with E Jibon Tomar Amar in 1997, which was released in 1998. She acted alongside Riaz in Indian-Bangladeshi film Moner Majhe Tumi in 2003, which became immensely popular. She did many movies with actors Riaz, Manna, Shakib Khan, Ferdous, and Amin Khan.

Her notable performance includes Megher Por Megh (2004) based on the liberation war of Pakistani and directed by Chashi Nazrul Islam. Shasti (2004), based on a story of Biswakabi Rabindranath Tagore directed by the same director earned her critical acclaim. In August 2005, she appeared with Shakib Khan in Shuva also directed by Chashi Nazrul Islam, based on the short story Shuva by Rabindranath Tagore. The film received highly positive reviews from critics as well as her performance. Purnima played a mute girl in this movie.

Her other notable commercial successes include Hridoyer Kotha 2006 and Akash Chhoa Bhalobasa (2008). Both were directed by S A Haque Alik.

She won Bangladesh National Film Award for Best Actress for her performance in 'Ora Amake Valo Hote Dilo Na' (2010).

Apart from acting in films, Purnima has also worked regularly in TV dramas. She has presented star talk shows "Ebong Purnima", "Purnima Alo" and "Boro Mancher Tarokara". She also presented "Merri Prothom Alo Award 2016" and "Merrill Prothom Alo Award 2017" with Ferdous.

She made her web-film debut in 2021 with Amitabh Reza Chowdhury's 'Munsigiri', where she acted alongside Chanchal Chowdhury.

== Personal life ==
Purnima has been married 3 times. She married her 1st husband, Mostaq Kibria, on September 6, 2005, but they divorced on May 15, 2007. After that, she married Ahmed Jalal Fahad on November 4, 2007. They have a daughter named Arshia Umaiza (born April 13, 2014). After their divorce in 2022, she married again to Ashfakur Rahman Robin in May 27, 2022.

== Filmography ==
Year	Film	Role	Co-Artist	Director	Notes
1998	Ei Jibon Tomar O Amar		Riaz	Jakir Hossain Raju	
1998	Modhu Purnima		Ferdous	M. A. Khan Sobuj	
1999	Sontan Jokhon Shotru		Ferdous, Bapparaj	Nayok Raj Razzak	
1999	Seyana Pagol		Rubel	A. J. Rana	
2000	Joddha	Shikha		Shahidul Islam Khokon	
2000	Tumi Je Amar		Shakil Khan, Bapparaj	Mokhlesur Rahman Golap	
2000	Jibon Chabi		Ferdous Ahmed, Shakil Khan, Popy	Alamgir Kumkum	
2000	Kallu Mama				
2000	Mone Rekho Amay			Nasir Uddin	
2000	Ajker Dapot			Shakib Khan	A J Rana
2001	Shikari		Shakib Khan	Ispahani Arif Jahan	
2001	Nishwase Tumi Biswase Tumi	Madhuri		Jakir Hossain Raju	
2001	Meghla Akash	Rafia Ahmed Rimi	Riaz	Nargis Akhter	
2001	Mayer Somman	Shanta	Riaz	Gazi Jahangir	
2001	Iblish			Sheikh Ruhul Amin	
2001	Mayer Jehad		Shakib Khan	Gazi Jahangir	
2001	Mejaj Gorom		Shakib Khan	Gazi Jahangir	
2002	Lal Doriya	Ayna	Riaz	F I Manik	
2002	Arman		Manna	Montazur Rahman Akbar	
2002	Mastaner Upor Mastan				
2002	Nayok				
2002	Bipodjonok				
2002	Khabordar			Mohammad Hannan	
2002	Hingshar Poton		Shakib Khan	Gazi Jahangir	
2002	Khoto Bikkhoto				
2002	Shami Strir Juddho	Asha			
2003	Jamai Shashur	Shiri	Riaz		
2003	Moner Majhe Tumi	Anu / Renu	Riaz	Motiur Rahman Pannu	Indo-Bangladesh joint production
2004	Megher Pore Megh		Riaz	Chashi Nazrul Islam	
2004	Tok Jhal Mishti	Priya	Riaz	Debashish Biswas	
2005	Shasti: The Punishment	Chandara Devi	Riaz	Chashi Nazrul Islam	
2005	Bolo Na Bhalobasha				
2005	Taka: The Ultimate Magic	Mouly Chowdhury	Riaz	Shahidul Islam Khokon	
2006	Hridoyer Kotha	Adhora	Riaz	SA Haque Alik	
2006	Badha	Sumaiya Islam Bristi	Shakib Khan, Riaz	Shahin Sumon	
2006	Shuva	Shuvashini	Shakib Khan	Chashi Nazrul Islam	
2006	Rakkhushi	Kunti	Ferdous		
2007	Sathi Tumi Kar	Sathi		M M Sarkar	
2007	Moner Sathe Juddho				
2007	Maa Amar Swargo		Shakib Khan	Gazi Jahangir	
2008	Tomakei Khujchi	Kajol	Riaz	Motin Rahman	
2008	Tumi Koto Sundor	Bhabna		Abid Hasan Badol	
2008	Akash Chhoa Bhalobasa	Chhoa	Riaz	SA Haque Alik	
2009	Ke Ami: Who Am I	Nilima	Riaz	Wakil Ahmed	
2009	Dhoni Goriber Prem			Abid Hasan Badol	
2009	Chirodin Ami Tomar		Riaz	F I Manik	
2009	Sromik Neta		Kazi Maruf	Kazi Hayat	
2009	Jiboner Cheya Dami	Sathi	Riaz	Mostafizur Rahman Babu	
2009	Shubho Bibaho	Special Appearance	Riaz, Ferdous, Apu Biswas	Debashish Biswas	
2010	Jomidaar		Riaz	Montazur Rahman Akbar	
2010	Poran Jaye Jolia Re		Shakib Khan	Sohanur Rahman Sohan	
2010	Ora Amake Bhalo Hote Dilo Na	Setu	Kazi Maruf		
2011	Matir Thikana		Shakib Khan	Shah Alam Kiran	
2012	I Love You		Shakib Khan, Nirob	Mushfiqur Rahman Gulzar	
2012	Raja Surjo Kha	Chad Sultana	Nirob, Kazi Maruf	Gazi Mahbub	
2013	Judge Barrister Police Commissioner		Shakib Khan	F I Manik	
2014	Lobe Pap Pape Mrittu		Riaz, Amin Khan	Sohanur Rahman Sohan	
2017	To Be Continued		Iftekhar Ahmed Fahmi, Mishu Sabbir, Rumel	Iftekhar Ahmed Fahmi	
2021	Munshigiri: Mriterao Kotha Bole	Suraiya Akter	Chanchal Chowdhury, Sabnam Faria	Amitabh Reza Chowdhury	
2021	Chironjeeb Mujib	Sheikh Fazilatunnesa Mujib	Ahmed Rubel		
2021	Jam†		Arifin Shuvoo, Ferdous	Noyeem Imtiaz Neyamul	
2021	Gangchil†		Ferdous	Noyeem Imtiaz Neyamul	

== Television ==
Year	Title	Role	Director	Network	Notes	Ref
	Patal Purir Golpo		Nargis Akhter			
	Ebong Valobasha		Subhah Dutt			
	Ei Korecho Valo		Mohammad Hannan			
	Lal Neel Beguni		Jahid Hasan			
2002	Ghorer Khobor Porer Khobor		Hanif Sonket		Eid Ul Adha Natok	
2002	Durghot		Hanif Sonket		Eid Ul Adha Natok	
	Tobuo Protikkha					
	Shastropani		Mohammad Hannan			
	Ogo Bodhu Shundori					
2011	Laboratory		Mahbuba Islam Shumi	Channel i	TV play, Based on Rabindranath Tagore's Laboratory	
2011	Ekhono Bhalobashi		Mahbooba Islam Shumi; Golam Rabbani	Channel i	Eid Telefilm	
2011	Nilimar Prante Dariye		SA Haque Olike	Channel i	Eid Natok	
2011	Omanisha		SA Haque Olike	Maasranga Television	Eid Natok	
2011	Oi Khane Jeonako Tumi		Arif Khan	NTV	Eid Natok	
2011	Ulto Dhanuk		Shamima Akter Baby	NTV		
2010	Laal Nil Beguni		Zahid Hasan	ATN Bangla		
2012	Shei To Fire Ele		Noyeem Imtiaz Neyamul	NTV		
2012	Idiots		Mohammad Mostafa Kamal Raz			
2015	Prem Othoba Duhshopner Raat Din		Tuhin Hossain; Nur Siddique	NTV	Eid Natok	
2015	Off Side					
2016	Sondehe Mondaho		Hanif Sonket		Eid Ul Adha Natok	
2016	Love & Co		Masud Sezan	Banglavision		
2016	Fire Jawa Holo Na		SA Haque Alik			
2017	Kajol Rekhar Korbani		Mohammad Mostafa Kamal Raz			
2017	Moner Bhetor Nodi		Saidur Rahman Rasel	Channel i		
2017	Shankhonil		Imraul Rafat	Banglavision		
2017	Ondhokkhone Ondhojone		Ruman Runi	Maasranga Television		
2017	Tumi Ami Pasha Pashi		Tania Ahmed	RTV		
2017	Hotath Prem Onek Bhalobasha		SA Haque Olike	Banglavision		
2017	Mrs Cook		Sraboni Ferdous	Banglavision		
2018	Candy Crush		Redoan Rony	Nagorik TV		
2018	Roddure Peyechi Tomar Naam		Rajibul Islam Rajib	Channel i	Eid Telefilm	
2018	Hello 911 Love Emergency		Mohammad Mostafa Kamal Raz	GTV		
2018	Portrait		Maksudur Rahman Bishal	NTV	Eid Telefilm	
2019	Sublet		Mizanur Rahman Aryan			
2020	Bhalo Bashabashi		Sagar Jahan			
2021	Ei Prithibi Amader		Sagar Jahan			

=== Music video ===
- Tomar Haath Pakhar Batashe with Akbar Ali Gazi

== Awards ==
=== Bangladesh National Film Awards ===
- Best Film Actress
  - Ora Amake Bhalo Hote Dilo Na (2010)

=== Meril Prothom Alo Awards ===
- Best Film Actress
  - Moner Majhe Tumi (2003)
  - Hridoyer Kotha (2006)
- Best Film Actress (Critics)
  - Dhoka (2007)
