= Mokbula Manzoor =

Bangladeshi writer (1938–2020)

Makbula Manzoor
- Bengali: মকবুলা মনজুর
- Born: 14 September 1938; Burdwan, Bengal Presidency, British India
- Died: 3 July 2020 (aged 81); Uttara, Dhaka, Bangladesh
- Other name: Mokbula Manzoor
- Education: MA Bengali literature, University of Dhaka
- Occupations: Author, novelist and academic
- Years active: 1968-2011
- Known for: Contributions to modern Bengali literature
- Children: 2 daughters, 2 sons
- Relatives: Ibne Mizan (brother)
- Website: makbulamanzoor.com

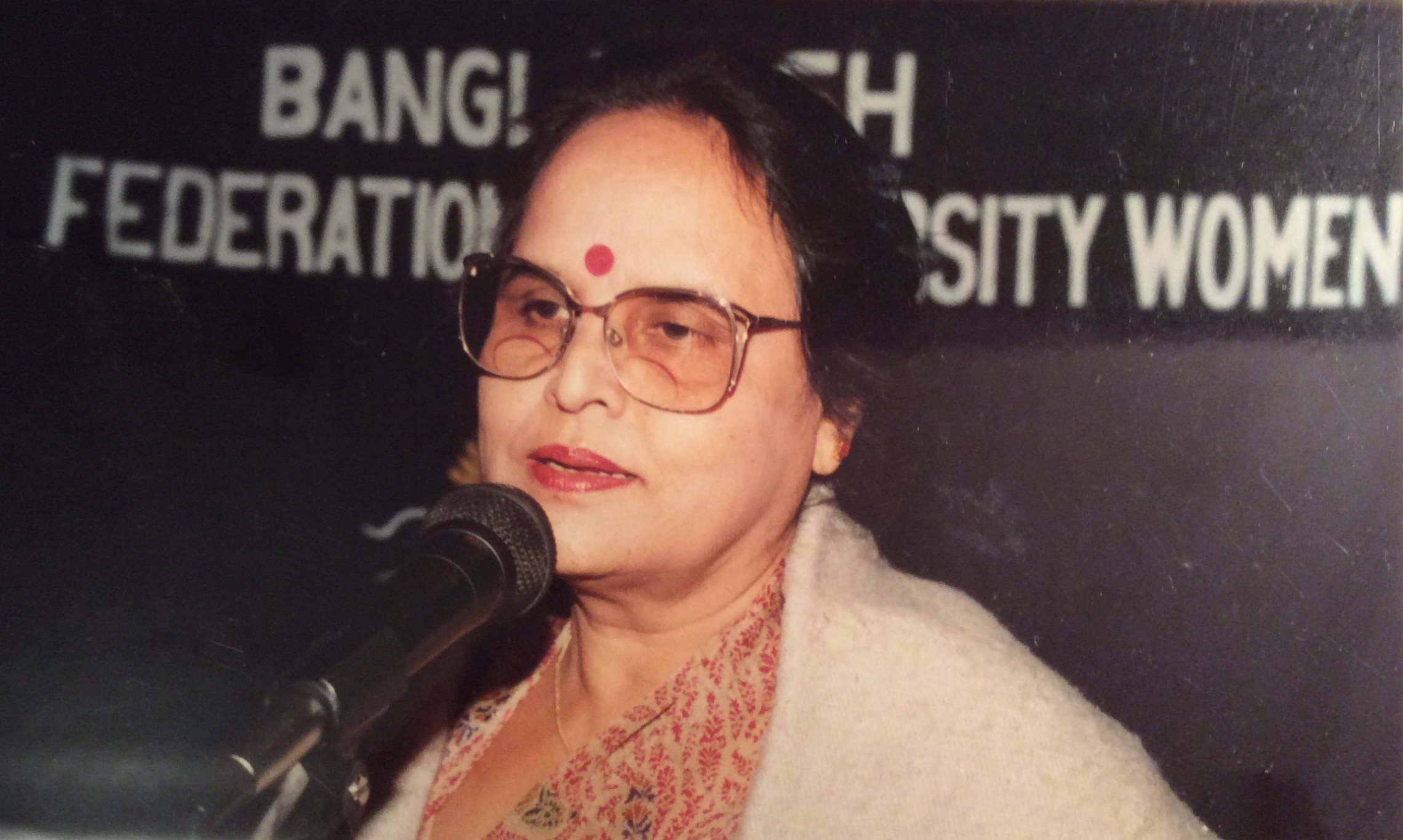
Makbula Manzoor delivering a speech at a conference hosted by Bangladesh Federation of University Women.

Makbula Manzoor or Mokbula Manzoor (Bengali: মকবুলা মনজুর; 14 September 1938 – 3 July 2020) was a Bangladeshi author and novelist. Her literary works are considered to have played a significant role in the creation of modern Bangladeshi literature. Author Syedur Rahman cites her together with Akhtaruzzaman Ilias, Selina Hossain and Hasan Hafizur Rahman as one of the notable contributors to modern Bangladeshi literature.

Makbula Manzoor is noted for writing from a woman's perspective in a male-dominated society; her 1998 novel Kaler Mandira is one such example, and references female exploitation during the Bangladesh Liberation War in 1971. She is considered to be an outstanding Bangladeshi female writer, inspired by the events which led to the creation of the country in 1971. Makbula is renowned for her novels, short stories and articles. A superb story-teller, Makbula has skillfully portrayed the socio-political history of Bangladesh and the endless struggle of ordinary men and women. She dedicated her writing to both children and adolescents, as well as adult fiction. Makbula received many national awards in recognition of her contribution to Bengali literature.

As a professor of Bengali literature, Makbula taught generations of students.

== Early life and education ==
Makbula Manzoor was born on 14 September 1938 in the city of Kalna, Bardhaman district, where her father was stationed as a Police Officer. Bardhaman was situated in the undivided India, now located in West Bengal.

Makbula spent most of her childhood years amongst the lush green fields, rivers and open skies of northern Bengal.

The nature of her father's police duties required the family to move throughout northern Bengal; across the Bogra, Pabna and Dinajpur districts. As a consequence of her father's various postings, Makbula attended many schools.

Makbula's early schooling took place across northern Bengal. She matriculated from Bindubasini Girls' High School in Tangail. Later, she completed her higher secondary schooling at Rajshahi College.

Makbula completed her Bachelor of Arts degree from Eden Girls College. She obtained her master's degree in Bangla Literature at the University of Dhaka.

== Career ==
=== Language Movement to Liberation War ===
Makbula Manzoor always maintained a strong cultural bond and political consciousness. She was active leading up to, during and following the Liberation War. Her experiences are reflected in many of her works, most notably in her novel Kaler Mondira (Cymbal of Time) where she documents the torture inflicted on the women of Bangladesh by Pakistani forces.

In February 1952, as a student in Tangail district, Makbula organised a group of fellow students to join a rally in solidarity with students in Dhaka shot and killed by the police. Those students were protesting against the West Pakistani politicians' decision to reject Bangla and make Urdu the state language. Makbula and her fellow students kicked open the hostel gate and joined the rally. This rebellious act resulted in an arrest warrant being issued for Makbula, and her suspension from the school.

Whilst a teacher in 1971, she was barred from hoisting the flag of Bangladesh which prompted her decision to leave the school.

=== Literary life ===
Makbula wrote one of her first poems at the age of eight which was published in Mukul Mahfil, the children's section of daily Azad. Through to her teenage years she wrote poems and some short stories but was later encouraged to focus on her fiction by the eminent artist Quamrul Hasan.

Whilst a Bachelor of Arts student, Makbula published her first novel Akash Kanya (Daughter of the Sky) which was serialised in the weekly Begum. Her first book Aar Ek Jiban (Another Life) was completed prior to finishing her master's degree. She adapted many of her stories into television and radio dramas. Makbula received many national awards in recognition of her contribution to Bengali literature. Her teenage fiction Danpite Chele (The Cheeky Boy) was made into a movie which won the National Film Award and Tashkent International Film Festival award in 1980.

== Works ==
=== Adult fiction ===
- Ar Ek Jiban (Another Life, 1968)
- Abasanna Gan (Tired Song,1982)
- Baishakhe Shirna Nadi (The River Shrunk in Baishakh, 1983)
- Shayanno Juthika (The Evening Jasmine 1993)
- Jal Rang Chabi (Watercolour Painting, 1984)
- Atmaja O Amra (Sons and Ourselves, 1988)
- Patita Prithibi (The Fallen Earth, 1989)
- Prem Ek Sonali Nadi (Love: A Golden River, 1989)
- Shiyare Niyata Surja (The Perpetual Sun over the Lying Head, 1989);
- Achena Nakshatra (The Unknown Star, 1990)
- Kone Dekha Alo (Light for Observing the Bride, 1991)
- Nirbacita Premer Upanyas (Selected romantic novels, 1992);
- Nadite Andhakar (Darkness on the River, 1996)
- LilaKamal (Toy Lotus, 1996)
- Kaler Mandira 1st Ed. (Cymbal of Time, Autobiographical novel 1997)
- Baul Batash (2001) Uttorbongo Publications
- Chaya Pothe Dekha (2002) Oitijjhya Publications
- Ektai Jeebon (2004) Shobha Publications
- Kaler Mondira 2nd Ed. (Cymbal of Time, Autobiographical novel 2004) Jonaki Prokashoni
- Matri Rheen (2004) Al-Mahdi Publications

=== Children's books ===
- Danpite Chele (Teenage Fiction) 1980 Bangladesh Children's Academy
- Chotoder Mahmuda Khatun Siddiqua 1983 (Biography for Children) Islamic Foundation
- Shahoshi Chele (Children's fiction) 1990 Srijon Prokashoni
- Akash Bhora Gaan (Children's fiction) 1996 Bangladesh Children's Academy
- Shopner Golap 2000 (Selected Children's short stories) Uttorbongo Prokashoni
- Shonar Jhapi (Teenage Fiction) 2001 Gonoprakashani
- Boner Pakhi Chandana (Selected children's short Stories) 2004 Gonoprakashani
- Deshe Deshe (Travelogue) 2005 Bangladesh Children's Academy
- Kishor Shomogro (Selected teenage novels and short stories) 2005 Al-Mahdi Publications
- Gramer Naam Phultoli (Teenage Fiction)2006 Gonoprakashani
- Shurjo Kishor 2006 (Selected folk and fairy tales) Shobha Prokash
- Chotoder Mahabharat (Abridged) 2011 Jonaki Prokashoni
- Promoththo Prohor (2008) Chayan Prokashan
- Ei Poth Ei Prem (2011) Shamachar Publications
- Orao Kaaj Kore (2011) Koly Prokashoni

== Awards ==
- Bangladesh Lekhika Sangha Prize (1984)
- Qamar Mushtari Prize (1990)
- Rajshahi Lekhika Sangha Literary Award (1993)
- National Archives and Library Best Book Prize (1997)
- Nondini Literary Award (1999)
- Bangla Academy Literary Award (2006)
- Ananya Literary Award (2007)
- Bangladesh Children's Academy Award (2010)
