= Rupantor =

2008 Bangladeshi drama film

- Poster
- Directed by: Abu Sayeed
- Written by: Abu Sayeed
- Produced by: Aangik Communications
- Starring: Ferdous Ahmed; Jayanta Chattopadhyay; Shakiba Binte Ali; Habibur Rahman Habib; Shatabdi Wadud; Bikrom; Mithun; Mrinal Datta; Nisan
- Edited by: Junaid Halim
- Music by: Abu Sayeed
- Release date: 2008
- Running time: 86 minutes
- Country: Bangladesh
- Language: Bengali

Rupantor (Bengali: রূপান্তর, lit. 'The Transformation') is a 2008 Bangladeshi drama film, written and directed by Abu Sayeed, who also composed the music. The film stars Ferdous Ahmed, Jayanta Chattopadhyay, Shakiba Binte Ali, Habibur Rahman Habib, Shatabdi Wadud, Bikrom, Mithun, Mrinal Datta and Nisan.

== Cast ==
- Ferdous
- Jayanta Chattopadhyay
- Shakiba Binte Ali
- Habibur Rahman Habib
- Shatabdi Wadud
- Bikrom
- Mithun
- Mrinal Datta
- Nisan.

== Awards ==
- Best Film, International Film Festival on Tribal Art, Bhopal, India, 2009.

== Festival participations ==
- Official selection, International Film Festival of India
- Official selection, International Film Festival of Kerala
- Official selection, Rome Independent Film Festival
- Official selection, Bangalore International Film Festival
- Official selection, Chennai International Film Festival.
