= Saquiba Bintay Ali =

Bangladeshi film actress

- শাকিবা বিনতে আলী
- Born: Saquiba Bintay Ali; November 29; Manikganj, Bangladesh
- Education: Independent University
- Occupations: Actress, Model
- Years active: 2004–present

Saquiba Bintay Ali, best known as Shakiba, is a Bangladeshi actress who has performed in films and television dramas.

== Biography ==
Shakiba entered into Dhallywood by acting Vondo Neta in 2005 but Jiboner Guarantee Nai was her first released film.

She also acted in television dramas like Kono Ek Godhuli Lagne, Surprise, Gulshan Avenue and Cholo Na Ghure Asi.

She graduated from Independent University in 2016 with an MBA in marketing.

== Selected filmography ==
- Vondo Neta (2004)
- Jiboner Guarantee Nai (2004)
- Bachao Desh (2004)
- Durdhorsho (2005)
- Premer Badha (2008)
- Takai Joto Gondogol (2008)
- Rupantor (2009) - Shaila
- Golapi Ekhon Bilatey (2010)
- Rickshawalar Chele (2010)
- Nag Naginir Swapno (2010)
- Majhir Chhele Barrister
- Bostir Chhele Kotipoti (2010)
- Ek Joban (2010)
- Dui Purush (2011)
- Matir Thikana (2011)
- Goriber Bhai (2011)
