= Singair Government College =

Educational Institution in Bangladesh

- সিংগাইর সরকারি কলেজ
- Type: Government
- Established: 1970
- Affiliations: National University
- Principal: Md. Nuruddin Hala
- Students: 3000
- Undergraduates: BSS (Pass), BSc (Pass), BBS (Pass), BSS(Honors), BBA (Honors)
- Other students: Higher Secondary, BM
- Location: Singair Upazila, Manikganj District, Bangladesh; 23.8156°N 90.1480°E

Singair Government College (Bengali: সিংগাইর সরকারি কলেজ) is a college in Singair, Manikganj. From the beginning, the college had undergraduate (pass) and undergraduate (honors) with higher secondary.

== History ==
The college is established in 1 July in 1970. Starting with only HSC candidates, in 1975, it had been included in Dhaka University with undergraduate (pass) and undergraduate (honors). From 1975, undergraduate students from this college have been participating in various exams with credits. Since 1998, Business Management (BM) branch has been introduced under Bangladesh Technical Education Board. The college has started honors courses in social work and management from the 2011–12 academic year.

== Present ==
Right now, there are 33 teaching staffs in the college. Every day, classes are held from 9 a.m. to 2 p.m. Degree (Pass) and Honors classes are held till 3 p.m. Currently, there are three thousand learners in the college of various course.

== Future plans ==
In near future, there are plans to introduce Honors and Masters courses in required subjects including accounting and political science in this college.
