= Megher Pore Megh =

Bangladeshi film

- Theatrical release poster
- Directed by: Chashi Nazrul Islam
- Written by: Rabeya Khatun (Book); Wakil Ahmed
- Produced by: Faridur Reza Sagar; Ibne Hasan Khan (Impress Telefilm)
- Starring: Riaz; Purnima; Mahfuz Ahmed; Shahidul Alam Sachchu
- Cinematography: Majibul Haque Bhuian
- Edited by: Atikur Rahman Mallick
- Music by: Emon Saha
- Distributed by: Impress Telefilm
- Release date: 2004
- Country: Bangladesh
- Language: Bengali

Megher Pore Megh (Bengali: মেঘের পরে মেঘ, meaning Clouds After Cloud) is a 2004 Bangladeshi Bengali-language feature film directed by Chashi Nazrul Islam. It is an adaptation of the novel Megher Pore Megh by Rabeya Khatun, based on the events of the Bangladesh Liberation War. It was produced by Faridur Reza Sagar and Ibne Hasan Khan in the banner of Impress Telefilm. It stars Riaz, Purnima, Mahfuz Ahmed and Shahidul Alam Sachchu, Riaz first time acting a duplicate character in this film such like Sezan and Majid.

== Cast ==
- Riaz as Sezan Mahmud/Majid
- Purnima as Suraiya
- Mahfuz Ahmed as Nishan
- Shahidul Alam Sachchu as Rajakar
- Sejan as Swadhin Mahmud
- Khaleda Akter Kalpana as
- Jamilur Rahman Shakha as
- Uttam Guho as
- Abul Hossain as
- Washimul Bari Rajib as
- Ameer Sirajee as
- Tareque Sikder as

== Awards and nomination ==
=== National Film Awards ===
- Best singer - Subur Nandi

== Music ==
The music and the background score for the film is composed by Emon Saha.

=== Sound track ===
1. Bhalobashi Sokale – Subir Nandi
