= It Was Raining That Night =

- Directed by: Mahesh Manjrekar
- Written by: Pankaj Parashar
- Produced by: Mahesh Manjrekar; Arvind Goel; Dinesh Mittal; N.D. Nagpal; Elizabeth Shah; Prashant Shah; Sagoon Wagh
- Starring: Riaz; Riya Sen; Sushmita Sen; Victor Banerjee
- Cinematography: Ram Arora
- Edited by: Samudra India
- Running time: 105 minutes
- Countries: India; United States; Bangladesh
- Languages: Bengali; English
- Budget: $950,000.00 (Estimated)

It Was Raining That Night is an English-Bengali bilingual film. Written and directed by Indian actor-director Mahesh Manjrekar, it is a relationship drama. The film was notable for being a joint production of India, United States and Bangladesh and stars Riaz, Riya Sen, Sushmita Sen, Victor Banerjee, Mahesh Manjrekar, Moon Moon Sen, Atit Shah, Dawn Moeller and Stefanie Siegel. The film remains unreleased.

== Cast ==
- Riaz as Vijay Kumar Dixit / Zaffar Khan
- Sushmita Sen as Ayesha Rao
- Riya Sen as Savitri Rao
- Victor Banerjee as Jai Banerjee
- Mahesh Manjrekar as Brij Bhushan
- Moon Moon Sen as Jaya Dixit
- Atit Shah as Virat Dixit
- Dawn Moeller as Johnson
- Stefanie Siegel as Shyna

== Box office ==
It Was Raining That Night film budget was as $950,0000 (estimated).

== Reception ==
The filming of It Was Raining That Night started in 2005 in locations such as India and United States. It is also the first time that Bangladeshi actor Riyaz Ahmed has acted with Bollywood actress Sushmita Sen.
