= Taka (film) =

Bangladeshi film

- Taka movie poster
- Directed by: Shahidul Islam Khokon
- Written by: Shahidul Islam Khokon
- Produced by: Misses Joy Islam
- Starring: Riaz; Purnima; Sohel Rana; Alamgir; Humayun Faridi; Suchorita; Hridoy Islam
- Cinematography: Hasan Ahmed
- Edited by: Chisti Jamal
- Music by: Milton Khondokar
- Distributed by: J K Movies
- Release date: 4 November 2004
- Running time: 150 minutes
- Country: Bangladesh
- Language: Bengali

Taka (Bengali: টাকা, English: Money) is a Bangladeshi feature film directed by Shahidul Islam Khokon. The film was released on Eid ul Fitre of 2005. The lead roles are played by Riaz, Purnima, Sohel Rana, Alamgir, Humayun Faridi, Suchorita and Hridoy Islam. Child actor Hridoy won Best Child actor, National Film awards of Bangladesh for his role.

== Cast ==
- Riaz as Shanto Mirza
- Purnima as Mouli Chowdhury
- Sohel Rana as Rayhan Chowdhury
- Alamgir as Shayakh Mirza
- Suchorita as Mouli's mother
- Humayun Faridi as Arman Chowdhury
- Hridoy Islam as Shuvro
- Ahmed Sharif (guest appearance)

== Awards ==
Hridoy Islam won Bangladesh National Film Awards as best child actor.
