= Wrong Number (2004 film) =

- VCD Cover
- Directed by: Motin Rahman
- Written by: Pronabh Bhatto
- Produced by: Faridur Reza Sagar (Impress Telefilm Ltd.)
- Starring: Riaz; Srabanti; Abdul Kader; Dolly Johur; Nasir Rahman; Tushar Khan; Amol Bose; Tahsina; Taskina
- Cinematography: Mostafa Kamal
- Edited by: Amzad Hossain
- Music by: Ahmed Imtiaz Bulbul; Ayub Bachchu; S.I. Tutul; Nachiketa Chakraborty (India)
- Distributed by: Impress Telefilm Limited
- Release date: 25 March 2004
- Running time: 144 minutes
- Country: Bangladesh
- Language: Bengali

Wrong Number also (Bengali: রং নাম্বার) is a Bangladeshi Bengali-language film. The film was released on 25 March 2004 all over Bangladesh. The film was directed by Matin Rahman and produced and distributed by Impress Telefilm Limited and it stars Riaz, Srabanti, Abdul Kader, Dolly Johur, Nasir Rahman, Tushar Khan, Amol Bose, Tahsina, Taskina and many more.

== Synopsis ==
The story revolves around different comical events regarding telephonic conversation. Othoi (Srabanti). a young girl loves to dial wrong numbers and through such an incident, gets involved with a boy Abir ( Riaz ). The story advances through a series of humorous events.

== Cast ==
- Riaz as Abir
- Srabanti as Othoi
- Abdul Kader as Boro Bhai
- Dolly Johur as Othoi's Aunt
- Nasir Rahman as
- Tushar Khan as Othoi's Father
- Amol Bose as Abir's Father
- Amin Tushar as Abir's Servant
- Tahsina as Othoi's College Friend
- Taskina as Othoi's College Friend

== Crew ==
- Director: Motin Rahman
- Producer: Faridur Reza Sagar (Impress Telefilm Ltd.)
- Story: Pronabh Bhatto
- Music: Ahmed Imtiaz Bulbul, Ayub Bachchu, S I Tutul and Nachiketa
- Lyrics: Ahmed Imtiaz Bulbul (Chikun Komor), Nachiketa (Tumi Jodi), Kabir Bokul (Preme Porechhey), Marzuk Russell (Amar Bhitor Theke Nami)
- Background Score: S I Tutul, Ayub Bachchu
- Cinematography: Mostafa Kamal
- Editing: Amzad Hossain
- Distributor: Impress Telefilm Limited

== Technical details ==
- Format: 35 MM (Color)
- Year of the Product: 2003
- Technical Support: Bangladesh Film Development Corporation (BFDC)

== Music ==
Wrong Number

Soundtrack album by Ayub Bachchu, Ahmed Imtiaz Bulbul, S I Tutul, Nachiketa
- Released: 2004 (Bangladesh)
- Recorded: 2004
- Genre: Films Sound Track
- Producer: CD PLUS

Wrong Number films music directed by the Popular composers Ayub Bachchu, S I Tutul and Indian singer Nachiketa composed the music for the movie while Nachiketa, Udit Narayan, Ferdous Ara and Mehreen lent their voice for the playbacks.

=== Soundtrack ===
Track	Title's	Singer's	Performer's
1	Amar Bhitor Thekey Nami	Mehreen	Ayub Bachchu
2	Preme Porechhey	Sabina Yasmin	S.I. Tutul
3	Tumi Jodi	Nachiketa	Nachiketa
4	Chikun Komor	Shakila Zafar and Kumar Bishwajit	Ahmed Imtiaz Bulbul
5	Tumi Amar Shondha	Udit Narayan and Ferdous Ara	Nachiketa
