= Banglar Nayok =

- VCD Cover
- Directed by: Dewan Nazrul
- Written by: Shaafi Nawaz
- Produced by: Jams Bangladesh Pvt. Ltd.
- Starring: Jashim; Shabana; Riaz; Sonia; Ahmed Sharif; Anowar Hossain
- Cinematography: Arun Roy
- Edited by: Aminul Islam Mintu
- Music by: Hossain Ali
- Distributed by: Jams Bangladesh Pvt. Ltd.
- Release date: 1995
- Running time: 143 minutes
- Country: Bangladesh
- Language: Bengali

Banglar Nayok (Bengali: বাংলার নায়ক, lit. 'The Hero of Bengal') is a Bangladeshi Bengali-language commercial and social action based film. The film was directed by Dewan Nazrul. It was released throughout Bangladesh in 1995. It was produced by Jams Bangladesh Pvt. Ltd.

The film's stars include Jashim, Shabana, Riaz, and Sonia. The story was written by Jashim. This film was Riaz's film debut, where he appeared as a supporting hero.

== Plot ==
The elderly press reporter 'Anowar Hossain' (Anwar Hossain) published a daily newspaper that reported on the activities of the wanted criminal 'Rowshan Chowdhury' (Ahmed Sharif). One day, Rowshan Chowdhury killed Anowar Hossain. Anowar Hossain's adolescent 'Rokeya' (Shabana) promises to take revenge on the killer. After 12 years, Rokeya becomes a professional lawyer. A rival mafia 'Don' (Jashim) joins forces with Rokeya, with Don providing the brawn and Rokeya the brains.

Rokeya's younger brother 'Munna' (Riaz) and 'Jully' (Sonia) are also students at the same university. While they don't bother each other at first, they eventually fall in love, although Jully's brother doesn't accept the relationship.

Rowshan Chowdhury and Don start a war to take Don's place. Don's sister Jully has gone to live with her lover Munna. Don loses his place as Don to save his sister. Don is no longer Don; he is now Banglar Nayok. Banglar Nayok' returns to a normal life with Rokeya, Jully and Munna. At the end of the story, 'Banglar Nayok' finally kills the most wanted criminal Rowshan Chowdhury.

== Cast ==
- Jashim as Don
- Shabana as Rokeya
- Riaz as Munna
- Sonia as Jully
- Anwar Hossain as Anwar Hossain
- Ahmed Sharif as Rowshan Chowdhury
- Azim
- Gangua

== Music ==
Banglar Nayok's film music was directed by Hossain Ali. Among the playback singers were Runa Laila and Andrew Kishore.

=== Sound track ===
Tracks	Titles	Singer(s)	Notes	Performers
1	Banglar Nayok		Title song	Jashim
2	Ami Don Ek Rajar Raja			Jashim
3	Banglar Baghini			Riaz and Sonia
4	Ami Tomake Bhalobasi			Riaz and Sonia
5	Piprer Kamor Diwna Amay			Riaz and Sonia
