= Matir Thikana =

Bangladeshi religious film

- Movie poster
- Directed by: Shah Alam Kiron
- Written by: Golam Morshad
- Produced by: Golam Morshad; Mritunjoy Dev Nath
- Starring: Shakib Khan; Purnima; Sakiba; Alimgir; Dithi; Ali Raj; Shormila Ahmed
- Music by: Imon Saha; Ahmed Imtiaz Bulbul
- Distributed by: Shondahani Kothachitro
- Release date: 10 June 2011
- Country: Bangladesh
- Language: Bengali

Matir Thikana (Bengali: মাটির ঠিকানা) is a Bangladeshi Bengali language religious film, released on 10 June 2011. The film was directed by Shah Alam Kiron, produced by Golam Morshad, and co-produced by Mritunjoy Dev Nath; distributed by Shondahani Kothachitro. The film stars Shakib Khan, Purnima, Alamgir, Diti in the lead roles. While singer James, Mila and Salma make special appearances.

== Cast ==
- Shakib Khan as Kallol
- Purnima as Bristi
- Shakiba
- Alamgir
- Parveen Sultana Diti
- Ali Raj
- Sharmili Ahmed
- Shiba Shanu
- Gulshan Ara Ahmed
- James in a special appearance
- Salma in a special appearance
- Mila Islam in a special appearance

== Music ==
Matir Thikana

Soundtrack album by Imon Saha and Ahmed Imtiaz Bulbul.
- Released: 2011 (Bangladesh)
- Recorded: 2010
- Genre: Films Sound Track

Matir Thikana films music was directed by Imon Saha and Ahmed Imtiaz Bulbul. Playback singers were Andrew Kishor, James, Kanak Chapa, Kona, Salma.

=== Soundtrack ===
No.	Title	Singer(s)	Length
1.	"Ghumonto Ek Shishu"	James
2.	"Choker Bhitor"	Salma
3.	"Jonme Cilam Ek Jon"	Kanak Chapa and Andrew Kishor
4.	"Nil Nil Akash"	Kona
5.	"Tumi Boro Shundor"	Kanak Chapa and Andrew Kishor
6.	"Kaliya Re Kaliya"	Mila

== Critical reception ==
Upon release, according to Hamidur Rahman and Naziur Rahman the film received mixed reviews from critics in Bangladesh. Daud Hossain Rony of Kaler Kantho gave the film 2.5 out of 5 stars.
