= Na Bolona =

Bangladeshi film

- Poster
- Directed by: Didarul Alam Badal
- Written by: Mohammed Rafiquzzaman
- Produced by: Didarul Alam Badal
- Starring: Riaz; Shimla; Sumona Shoma; Ferdous Ahmed; Bobita; Fazlur Rahman Babu
- Cinematography: Mahfuzur Rahman Khan
- Edited by: Mujibur Rahman Dulu
- Music by: Ahmed Imtiaz Bulbul
- Distributed by: 3S Productions
- Release date: 7 April 2006
- Running time: 144 minutes
- Country: Bangladesh
- Language: Bengali

Na Bolona (Bengali: না বোলনা) is a 2006 Bangladeshi film starring Riaz, Shimla, Sumona Shoma, and Ferdous Ahmed in the lead roles. It is a love triangle which was released on 7 April 2006 and was a success at the box office.

== Cast ==
- Riaz
- Shimla
- Sumona Shoma
- Ferdous Ahmed
- Khalil Ullah Khan
- Sharmili Ahmed
- Bobita
- Masud Ali Khan
- Fazlur Rahman Babu

== Soundtrack ==
Na Bolona

Soundtrack album by Ahmed Imtiaz Bulbul
- Released: 2006
- Genre: film music
- Producer: Anupam

No.	Title	Singer(s)
1	Ki Kotha Je Likhi	Andrew Kishore & Shakila Zafar
2	Picnic-eri Dhom	Samina Chowdhury & Shakila Zafar
3	Nodi Chay Cholte	Samina Chowdhury
4	Jokhoni Keu Bhalobashe	Shakila Zafar
5	Gane Gane Chena Holi	Andrew Kishore & Samina Chowdhury
6	Chokh Sorano Joto Sohoj	Andrew Kishore, Samina Chowdhury & Shakila Zafar
