= Hridoyer Kotha =

2006 Bangladeshi movie directed by SA Haque Alik

- Hridoyer Kotha movie poster
- Directed by: SA Haque Alik
- Story by: M A Shahid
- Produced by: Riaz, Tuhin Borua
- Starring: Riaz, Purnima
- Cinematography: Alamgir Khasru
- Edited by: Fazle Haque
- Music by: Alauddin Ali, S.I. Tutul, Habib Wahid
- Production company: G-Series
- Release date: 18 October 2006
- Country: Bangladesh
- Language: Bengali

Hridoyer Kotha (Bengali: হৃদয়ের কথা) is a Bangladeshi film released on 18 October 2006 and directed by S.A. Haque Alik. Riaz produced the movie, the first time in his career. Kazi Riton is the associate producer of this movie Hridoyer Kotha. Notable songs in the film include "Valobasbo Bashbo Re" (Habib Wahid) and "Jay Din Jay Ekaki" (S.I. Tutul).

== Cast ==
- Riaz – Anik
- Purnima – Adhora
- Tushar Khan
- Doli Johur – Adhora's mother
- Dr. Ejaj – Porter
- Nasrin
- Gulshan Ara Ahmed
- Mannan Shafiq
- Moushumi
- Sakib Akash Khan - Sagor

== Soundtrack ==
Hridoyer Kotha

Soundtrack album by Alauddin Ali, Habib Wahid and S.I. Tutul
- Released: 2005
- Genre: Film soundtrack
- Label: Laser Vision
- Producers: Riaz, Tuhin Borua

Alauddin Ali chronology
Hridoyer Kotha (2005)

Habib Wahid chronology
Hridoyer Kotha (2005)	Akash Chhoa Bhalobasa (2008)

S.I. Tutul chronology
Hridoyer Kotha (2005)	Nirontor (2006)

The soundtrack for the film was conducted Alauddin Ali, with music directors Habib Wahid and S.I. Tutul. Habib Wahid has sung "Bhalobasabo Basabore Bondhu" and S.I. Tutul has sung "Jay Din Jay Ekaki". Track listing for the soundtrack is adapted from Apple Music and Google Play.

=== Track listing ===
No.	Title	Singer(s)	Length
1.	"Valobashbo Bashbo Re (Version 1)"	Habib Wahid	4:52
2.	"Kotota Bocchor Ei Shukh"	Monir Khan & Kanak Chanpa	4:49
3.	"Jay Din Jay Ekaki"	S.I. Tutul	5:04
4.	"Tomar Karone Ami"	Andrew Kishore & Samina Chowdhury	4:33
5.	"Tomake Chhere Ami Ki"	Monir Khan & Eva Rahman	5:16
6.	"Ami Jamalpurer Pola"	A'Gun & Momtaj	3:37
7.	"Valobashbo Bashbo Re (Version 2)"	Habib Wahid	4:22
8.	"Ektai Jibon"	Himandhri	1:32
9.	"Choto Choto Dhew"	Kumar Bishawjit	3:59
10.	"Khub Beshi Jante Ichchey"	Tonmoy Tansen & Kona	3:15
11.	"Raag"	Tonmoy Tansen	3:51

== Awards ==
Meril Prothom Alo Awards

- Public Choice Awards for Best Film Actor - Riaz
- Public Choice Awards for Best Film Actress - Purnima
- Public Choice Awards for Best Singer (Male) - Habib Wahid (Bhalobasbo Basbore Bondhu)

== See also ==
- Akash Chhoa Bhalobasa
