= Ibne Mizan =

Bangladeshi film director

- Born: 7 October 1930
- Died: 28 March 2017 (aged 86)
- Education: Dhaka University
- Occupation: Film Director
- Relatives: Mokbula Manzoor (sister)

Ibne Mizan (7 October 1930 – 28 March 2017) was a Bangladeshi film director. He directed many films. He was known for directing folk fantasy films. His sister Mokbula Manzoor is an author.

== Biography ==
Mizan was born on 7 October 1930 in Sirajganj. He was a student of Dhaka University's Bangla department.

Mizan's first direction was an Urdu film titled Aur Gham Nehi. This film was an unreleased film. Then, he directed Abar Bonobase Rupban. This film is selected for preservation in Bangladesh Film Archive. He also directed films like Nishan, Chondon Dwiper Rajkonya, Bahadur, Koto Je Minoti, Rakhal Bondhu, Jighangsha and Laily Majnu. These films are selected for preservation in Bangladesh Film Archive too. Sagorkonya was his last direction. He left Bangladesh in 1990 and after that he started living permanently in Corona, California.

Mizan died on 28 March 2019 in Corona, California at the age of 86.

== Selected filmography ==
- Aur Gham Nehi (unreleased)
- Ek Aler Roop Katha (1965)
- Abar Bhano Bhase Roopban (1966)
- Zarina Sundari (1966)
- Jangli May (1967)
- Rakhan Bandhu (1968)
- Naginir Prem (1969)
- Patal Purir Rajkonya (1969)
- Shaheed Tito Mir (1969)
- Koto Je Minoti (1970)
- Dui Rajkumar (1975)
- Ek Mutho Bhat (1976)
- Nishan (1977)
- Laily Majnu (1983)
- Chondon Dwiper Rajkonya (1984)
- Komolranir Dighi
- Amir Saodagor O Velua Sundori
- Daku Mansur
- Jighangsa
- Shahzada
- Taj O Tolowar
- Patal Bijoy
- Punormilon
- Rajbodhu
- Baghdader Chor
- Rajkumari
- Raj Nortoki
- Basantamaloti
- Bahadur
- Noujoan
- Sagorkonya
