= Moner Majhe Tumi =

2002 Bangladeshi film by Motiur Rahman Panu

- Directed by: Motiur Rahman Panu
- Written by: Motiur Rahman Panu (dialogue); Ali Azad (script)
- Screenplay by: Motiur Rahman Panu
- Story by: M. S. Raju
- Produced by: Abbas Ullah Shikder; G. A. Seshagiri Rao (co-producer)
- Starring: Riaz; Purnima; Jisshu Sengupta; Biplab Chatterjee; Siraj Haider; Shankar Chakraborty; Moumita Gupta
- Cinematography: M. V. Ramkrishna; Rokibul Bari Chowdhury
- Edited by: Majibur Rahman Dulu; Samarasimha Rao; Narasimha Rao
- Music by: Devendranath Chaterjee
- Production company: Anandamela Chalochitra Ltd. (Bangladesh); Padmalaya Studios (India)
- Distributed by: Anandamela Chalochitra Ltd. Ashirbad Cholochitra
- Release date: 15 August 2003
- Running time: 150 minutes
- Countries: Bangladesh; India
- Box office: ৳4.5 crore (equivalent to ৳7.7 crore or US$630,000 in 2024)

Moner Majhe Tumi (transl. You’re in my Soul) is a 2003 Bangladesh and India joint venture Bengali-language romantic drama film directed by Motiur Rahman Panu and produced Abbas Ullah Shikder under the banner of Anandamela Chalochitra Ltd. and co-produced by G. A. Seshagiri Rao under the banner of Padmalaya Studios. It is an official remake of the 2001 Indian Telugu-language film Manasantha Nuvve. It was the highest-grossing film in Bangladesh in 2003, and was selected for preservation at the Bangladesh Film Archive.

== Plot ==
The story of this film revolves around the friendship of two teenagers, Chintu and Anu. They are very good friends. They enjoy playing together, chasing butterflies, getting wet in the rain, and singing songs to the various beauties of nature. Chintu, being the son of a poor family, is beaten by Anu's father for playing with Anu. Anu gets very feverish after getting wet in the rain and Chintu secretly takes Anu to a shrine. Standing at the shrine, the two promise that they will both come to this shrine every year on Anu's birthday.

One day, in a series of events, the two of them get separated. Before leaving, Anu gifts Sintu a musical watch and tells her to study hard. Sintu keeps the watch given by Anu with great care. After a few days, Sintu's mother dies and after her mother's death, he grows up in another family as their own son named Benu. Anu returns home after completing a stage of higher education abroad. As per her promise to her childhood friend Sintu, she goes to their old place (the shrine) on her birthday, but she does not meet Chintu. He is late in arriving there. When Chintu arrives and sees the birthday wish of her childhood friend (the shrine), the deep dream of Lalit in her heart doubles. The two of them run in search of their friend's love.

Anu decides to write a story about their childhood events and arrange for it to be published in a weekly magazine. Hearing this, another friend of Anu, Arun, says that in this internet age, not even ten percent of people read weekly magazines. But Anu says that he does not want to miss this ten percent opportunity. When the story is written and published in the weekly Sananda, Anu changes his name and gives the author the name Renu. The story became a hit with readers and many people wrote letters to Anu, but there was no letter from her childhood friend Sintu. This raised many questions in Anu's mind, yet she kept moving forward in the hope of finding her friend.

But fate's cruel irony - even though they met a few times, no one could recognize each other due to the change of their names. One day, on the stage of a TV show, Anu heard Benu talking about their childhood love and realized that Benu was her childhood friend Chintu. Anu's dream world became more colorful in an instant. But Anu hid her identity and went to Benu's house a few times and a friendly relationship developed with them. Meanwhile, her father arranged Anu's marriage with the son of an MP. Anu started crying after hearing about the marriage and told her father that she had found her childhood friend and that Anu wanted to marry him. Anu's father did not object to this at all. Benu's other friend Shruti (Tanu Roy) tells Chintu that the story "Moner Majhe Tumi" written by Renu in a weekly magazine is about Benu's childhood. Later, after reading the story, Benu realizes that the writer Renu is her childhood friend Anu.

Incidentally, Benu's younger sister Rekha's marriage is fixed with the son of Anu's father's associate. And that marriage depends on Anu's father's opinion. So Anu's father tricks Benu and tells him that your younger sister Rekha will get married only if Anu marries the son of an MP. Rekha's marriage had broken up for Benu once before, so this time Benu decides to marry Rekha, even if he forgets about his love. The next day, Benu and Anu are supposed to meet on a beach. Benu, despite getting close to the person she has cherished for 12 years, gives her back the love she gave to Anu's father on the condition that she will save her sister's marriage. Anu, misunderstanding, leaves.

== Cast ==
- Riaz as Benu "Chintu"
- Purnima as Renu "Anu"
  - Suhani Kalita as Anu (young)
- Jisshu Sengupta as Arun
- Biplab Chatterjee as Mohan Sarkar
- Tanu Roy as Shruti
- Dulal Lahiri
- Siraj Haider as Politician
- Shankar Chakraborty as Haabu
- Moumita Gupta as Rekha, Mohan's wife
- Arpita Dutta Chowdhury
- Rajitha as Mohan's friend and marriage broker
- Mita Chaterjee as Grandmother
- Abbas Ullah as Magazine Editor
- Ali Azad
- Pallab

== Music ==
Moner Majhe Tumi

Studio album by Devendranath Chaterjee, R.P. Patnaik and Vidyasagar
- Released: May 2002 (Bangladesh)
- Genre: Feature film soundtrack
- Label: Zee Music
- Producer: Anupam

The songs and background score were composed by Devendranath Chaterjee, an Indian composer. All the songs were superhits. The song "Akashe Batase" was reused from the original Telugu film, Manasantha Nuvve, which was itself based on a Malayalam song titled "Kannadi Koodum Kootti" from the film Pranayavarnangal (1998), sung by singers K. J. Yesudas and K. S. Chithra and composed by Vidyasagar. Whereas "Chupi Chupi Kichu Kotha" is a remake of the Telugu song "Kita Kita Thalupulu" (sung by K. S. Chitra) and "Moner Majhe Tumi" is a remake from "Manasantha Nuvve" (sung by Hemachandra and Usha). Both of these songs are from the original Telugu film.

| Track | Songs | Singers | Lyrics |
|---|---|---|---|
| 1 | "Akashe Batashe Chol Sathi" | Kavita Krishnamurti and Sadhana Sargam | Priyo Chaterjee |
| 2 | "Premi O Premi" | Udit Narayan and Sadhana Sargam | Priyo Chaterjee |
| 3 | "Chupi Chupi Kichu Kotha" | Kavita Krishnamurthy | Priyo Chaterjee |
| 4 | "Pran Kade Hay" | Kumar Sanu | Priyo Chaterjee |
| 5 | "Jibone Koto Ritu Ashe Jay" | Kumar Sanu | |
| 6 | "Moner Majhe Tumi" | Udit Narayan and Sadhana Sargam | Priyo Chaterjee |
| 7 | "Akash Chhowa Swapno Asha" | Sadhana Sargam and Shaan | Priyo Chaterjee |
| 8 | "Dukkho Jala Kashtote" | Kumar Sanu | Priyo Chaterjee |

== Awards ==
| Awards | Categories | Recipient(s) | Result | Ref |
|---|---|---|---|---|
| Binodan Bichitra Puraskar | Best Film | Moner Majhe Tumi | Won | |
| Meril Puraskar | Best Actor (Feature Film) | Riaz | Won | |
| Meril Puraskar | Best Actress (Feature Film) | Purnima | Won | |
