= Ki Jadu Korila =

2008 Bangladeshi film

- VCD Cover
- Directed by: Chandan Chowdhury
- Written by: Chandan Chowdhury
- Produced by: Anowar Hossain Mintu
- Starring: Riaz; Popy; Mir Sabbir; Ratna; Sagorika; Humayun Faridi; Dolly Johur; Rehana Jolly
- Cinematography: Mahfuzur Rahman Khan
- Edited by: Sahidul Haque
- Music by: Alam Khan
- Distributed by: Sadia Hossain Kothachitra
- Release date: 25 March 2008
- Running time: 143 minutes
- Country: Bangladesh
- Language: Bengali

Ki Jadu Korila (Bengali: কি যাদু করিলা) is a Bangladeshi Bengali-language film directed by Chandan Chowdhury. Chowdhury has worked as assistant director with Bangladeshi filmmaker Abdullah Al Mamun. This was Chandan Chowdhury's film direction debut. It was released in 2008 during Eid-ul-Fitr and won National Award in six categories.

== Cast ==
Actor/Actress	Roles
Riaz	Sagor
Popy	Jhinuk
Mir Sabbir	Akash
Ratna	Dana
Sagorika	Parul
Humayun Faridi	Kamal Chairman
Dolly Johur	Akash's Mother
Rehana Jolly	Sagor's Mother
Kabila	Sagor's Maternal Uncle
Shirin Alam	Jhinuk's Aunt
Waliul Haq Rumi	

== Music ==
Ki Jadu Korila

Studio album by Alam Khan
- Released: 2008 (Bangladesh)
- Recorded: 2008
- Genre: Feature film soundtrack
- Producer: Eglle Music

=== Soundtrack ===
Track's	Title's	Singer's	Performer's	Note's
1	Prem Koro Mon Khati Manush Chine	Andrew Kishore	Riaz	
2	Chokkhu Duita Kajol Kalo	Andrew Kishore	Riaz and Popy	
3	Ki Jadu Korila Piriti Shikhaia	Sabina Yasmin and Andrew Kishore	Riaz and Popy	
4	Tomar Sathey Bhab Koritey	Runa Laila	Riaz and Sagorika	
5	Tomar Akash Bukey Mon Pakhi	Runa Laila and S I Tutul	Mir Sabbir and Ratna	
6	Januk Januk Sakoley Dekhuk	Sabina Yasmin and S I Tutul	Mir Sabbir and Popy	
