= Praner Cheye Priyo =

Bangladeshi film

- Poster
- Directed by: Mohammad Hannan
- Written by: Arif Mahmud
- Produced by: Mass Media Limited
- Starring: Riaz; Ravina; Bulbul Ahmed; Bobita; Wasimul Bari Rajib; Humayun Faridi; Anwar Hossain; Abul Hayat
- Cinematography: Sirajul Islam Siraj
- Edited by: Aminul Islam Mintu
- Music by: Ahmed Imtiaz Bulbul
- Release date: 1997
- Running time: 150 minutes
- Country: Bangladesh
- Language: Bengali

Praner Cheye Priyo (transl. More beloved than life) is a 1997 Bangladeshi film starring Riaz and Ravina in lead roles. It was Rabina's debut film. The film became a commercial success. The songs "Je Prem Swargo Theke Ase" and "Porena Chokher Polok" enjoyed chart success.

== Synopsis ==
The story revolves around the story of a robber that is heartless and wicked. One day an old woman slapped him and wanted to know for whom he had committed this sin. The robber thought of his forcibly married wife. He ran and saw that there was no one in the house. He left his weapon and wept and went to a shrine. The boy grew up named Sajib (Riaz). Meanwhile, his wife died giving birth to a daughter. And she grew up with another childless mother. In a wedding ceremony, this young woman responds to values and pride, and love is born out of love.

== Cast ==
- Riaz
- Ravina
- Bulbul Ahmed
- Bobita
- Wasimul Bari Rajib
- Humayun Ahmed
- Anwar Hossain
- Abul Hayat

== Music ==
Ahmed Imtiaz Bulbul was the music director and lyricist of the film.

=== Soundtrack ===
Track	Song	Singer	Notes
1	Je Prem Swargo Theke Ese	Khalid Hasan Milu and Kanak Chapa	
2	Porena Chokher Polok	Andrew Kishore	
3	Dhoni Gorib Dui Projati	Runa Laila	
4	Tomar Monta Amake	Andrew Kishore and Kanak Chapa	
5	Amar Ki Porichoy	Andrew Kishore	
