= Biyer Phul =

Bangladeshi romantic film

- VCD Cover
- Directed by: Motin Rahman
- Written by: Joseph Satabdi
- Produced by: Anandamela Cinema Limited
- Starring: Riaz; Shakil Khan; Shabnur; Kabori; Amol Bose; Prabir Mitra; Ahmed Sharif; Misha Sawdagor
- Cinematography: Mostafa Kamal
- Edited by: Amjad Hossain
- Music by: Ahmed Imtiaz Bulbul
- Distributed by: Ananda Mela Cinema
- Release date: January 1999
- Running time: 150 Minutes
- Country: Bangladesh
- Language: Bengali

Biyer Phul (Bengali: বিয়ের ফুল, lit. 'Wedding Flowers') is a Bangladeshi romantic movie. It was released in 1999 and directed by Motin Rahman. The film stars Riaz, Shabnur, and Shakil Khan in lead roles along with Kabori, Amol Bose, Prabir Mitra, Ahmed Sharif, and Misha Sawdagor. The movie is a remake of the 1992 Hindi language film Deewana.

== Cast ==
- Riaz – Sagor
- Shakil Khan – Akash
- Shabnur – Nadi
- Kabori – Dilruba
- Amol Bose – Kashem Mallik
- Prabir Mitra – Ashrafi
- Ahmed Sharif – Aslam Chowdhury
- Misha Sawdagor – Didar

== Music ==
Ahmed Imtiaz Bulbul was music director for the film.

=== Soundtrack ===
Track	Song	Singer	Notes
1	Tomay Dekhle Mone Hoy	Andrew Kishore and Rumana Islam Kanak Chapa	
2	Nesha Lagilo Re Baka Dunoyone	Agun and Rumana Islam Kanak Chapa	
3	Payel Amar Rumjhum Bajere	Andrew Kishore and Rumana Islam Kanak Chapa	
4	O Nodir Panire De Koiya De	Alamgir	
5	Dil Dil Dil Tumi Amar Dil	Andrew Kishore and Rumana Islam Kanak Chapa	
6	Oi Chad Mukhe Jeno Lagena Groho	Andrew Kishore	
7	Pother Majhe Khuje Pabi Apon Thikana	James	
8	Mon Na Dile Hoy Ki Prem	Kumar Sanu and Alka Yagnik	

== See also ==
- Soshur Bari Zindabad
- Rani Kuthir Baki Itihash
