= Shasti =

Bangladeshi film

- VCD Cover
- Directed by: Chashi Nazrul Islam
- Written by: Rabindra Nath Tagore (Literature); Momtaj Uddin Ahmed
- Produced by: Impress Telefilm Ltd.
- Starring: Ilias Kanchan; Campa; Riaz; Purnima; Shahidul Alam Sachchu; ATM Shansuzzaman; Nasrin
- Cinematography: Majibul Haque Bhuyan
- Edited by: Atikur Rahman Mallick
- Music by: Imon Saha; Khandokar Nurul Alam
- Distributed by: Impress Telefilm Ltd.
- Release date: 2004
- Running time: 143 minutes
- Country: Bangladesh
- Language: Bengali

Shasti (Bengali: শাস্তি; ''Punishment'') is a Bangladeshi Bengali-language film. It is the film presented by HSBC Bank Bangladesh. It was released in 2004 all over Bangladesh.

== Cast ==
- Ilyas Kanchan as Dukhiram
- Campa as Radha
- Riaz as Chhidam
- Purnima as Chandora
- Shahidul Alam Sachchu as Zamindar
- ATM Shansuzzaman as Teacher
- Nasrin (special appearance in song "Moirechhere Moirechhere")

== Crew ==
- Producer: Faridur Reza Sagar (Impress Telefilm Ltd.)
- Story: Rabindra Nath Tagore (Literature)
- Script: Momtaj Uddin Ahmed
- Dialogue: Momtaj Uddin Ahmed
- Screenplay: Chashi Nazrul Islam
- Director: Chashi Nazrul Islam
- Art Director: Ashok Kumar Ghosh
- Cinematography: Majibul Haque Bhuyan
- Editing: Atikur Rahman Mallick
- Music: Imon Saha and Khandokar Nurul Alam
- Lyrics: Rabindra Nath Tagore and Mohammad Rafikuzzaman
- Background Sound: Imon Shaha
- Distributor: Impress Telefilm Ltd.

== Technical details ==
- Format: 35 mm (color)
- Reel: 15 Pans
- Running Time: 143 minutes
- Original Language: Bengali
- Subtitle: English
- Country of Origin: Bangladesh
- Date of Theatrical Release: 2004
- Year of the Product: 2003-2004
- Technical Support: Bangladesh Film Development Corporation (BFDC)

== Award and achievement ==
=== International awards ===
Shasti won a second prize in the "Bangla Showcase" category in the 3 International Film Festival Bangladesh Award 2006.

In 2005 it was selected for "best co-actor" and "best co-actress"

=== National Film Awards ===
- Won Best co-actor Elias Kanchan 2004
- Won Best co-actress Campa 2004

=== Other achievements ===
- Won Best Film: Impress Telefilm Ltd. 2005
- Won Best Actor: Riaz 2005
- Won Best Actress: Purnima 2005
- Won Best Music Director: Khandokar Nurul Alam and Imon Shaha

=== Golden Jubilee Film Audience Awards ===
- Won Best Film: Impress Telefilm Ltd. 2005

== Music ==
Shasti's music directors are Imon Saha and Khandokar Nurul Alam. Two, 'Tui Chhara Amar Chkhe' and 'Moirechhere Moirechhere' have lyric by Mohammad Rafikuzzam. Some songs are from Rabindra Sangeet. Playback singer are Sabina Yasmin, Andrew Kishore, Sadi Mohammad and Rezwana Chowdhury Banya.

== Soundtrack ==
| Tracks | Titles | Singers | Performers | Notes |
|---|---|---|---|---|
| 1 | 'Tui Chhara Amar Chkhe' | Sabina Yasmin and Andrew Kishore | Riaz and Purnima | |
| 2 | 'Moirechhere Moirechhere' | Sabina Yasmin | Nasrin | |
| 3 | 'Bhalobese Sokhi' | Sadi Mohammad | | Rabindra Sangeet |
| 4 | 'Bhalobese Sokhi' | Sadi Mohammad and Rezwana Chowdhury Banya | Riaz and Purnima | Rabindra Sangeet |
| 5 | 'Amar Jabar Belay' | Rezwana Chowdhury Banya | Purnima | Rabindra Sangeet |
