= Ahmed Imtiaz Bulbul =

Bangladeshi lyricist, composer and music director (1956–2019)

- Born: 1 January 1956; Dhaka, Pakistan
- Died: 22 January 2019 (aged 63); Dhaka, Bangladesh
- Occupations: Lyricist, composer and music director
- Children: 1
- Awards: Full list

Ahmed Imtiaz Bulbul (1 January 1956 – 22 January 2019) was a Bangladeshi lyricist, composer and music director, active since the late 1970s. He was a freedom fighter who joined the Bangladesh Liberation War at the age of 15. He won Ekushey Padak and Bangladesh National Film Award for Best Music Director twice for the films Premer Taj Mahal (2001) and Hajar Bachhor Dhore (2005).

== Early life ==
Bulbul was born on 1 January 1956 in Dhaka. He studied at West End High School in Azimpur, Dhaka.

== Career ==
Bulbul's compositions include a number of works for films, beginning with 1978's Megh Bijli Badol.

He has also released independent albums and created works for a number of Bangladeshi performers, including Samina Chowdhury, Kanak Chapa, Khalid Hassan Milu and Andrew Kishore.

He was a judge on the talent show Closeup 1 Tomakei Khujchhe Bangladesh for three seasons.

== Discography ==
Selected composed film songs

Film	Song	Picturised	Singer	Notes
Golam	"Duti Mone Lege Geche Jura"	Shakib Khan, Shabnur	Kanak Chapa, Andrew Kishor	
Praner Cheye Priyo	"Je Prem Shorgo Theke Eshe"	Riaz, Ravina	Kanak Chapa, Khalid Hassan	
Praner Cheye Priyo	"Porena Chokher Polok Ki"	Riaz, Ravina	Andrew Kishore	
Premer Taj Mahal	"Ei Buke Boichhe Jamuna"	Riaz, Shabnur	Kanak Chapa, Monir Khan	
Hajar Bachhor Dhore	"Tumi Sutoi Bedhechho Shapla"	Riaz, Shashi	Subir Nandi, Anupoma	
Phool Nebo Na Ashru Nebo	"Amar Hridoy Ekta Ayna Ei"	Shakib Khan, Shabnur	Kanak Chapa, Andrew Kishore	
Phool Nebo Na Ashru Nebo	"Bidi Tumi Bole Daw Ami Kar"	Shakib, Amin Khan, Shabnur	Kanak Chapa, Andrew Kishore	
Biyer Phul	"Tomay Dekhle Mone Hoy"	Shakil Khan, Shabnur	Kanak Chapa, Andrew Kishore	
Biyer Phul	"Oi Chad Mukhe Jeno Lagena"	Riaz, Shakil Khan, Shabnur	Andrew Kishore	
Noyoner Alo	"Amar Sara Deho Kheyore"	Zafor Iqbal	Andrew Kishore	
Chandan Diper Rajkonna	"Ami Tomari Premo Bhikhari"	Wasim, Anju Ghosh	Syed Abdul Hadi	
Shohojatri	"Prithibir Joto Shukh Ami"	Ilias Kanchan, Champa	Sabina Yasmin, Andrew Kishore	
Anondo Osru	"Tumi Mor Jiboner Vabona"	Salman Shah, Shabnur, Kanchi	Kanak Chapa, Andrew Kishore	
Bhalobashi Tomake	"Onek Shadhonar Pore Ami"	Riaz, Shabnur	Kanak Chapa, Khalid Hassan	
Bhalobasha Bhalobasha	"Premo Ronge Rangiyechi Mon"	Riaz, Shabnur	Kanak Chapa, Monir Khan	

== Bangladesh Liberation war ==
Bulbul joined the Bangladesh Liberation war in 1971 when he was 15 years old. He served in a Mukti Bahini base in Zinzira. His older brother, Iftekhar Uddin Ahmed Tutul, served in the Crack Platoon of the Mukti Bahini. He trained in India and fought in Lalbagh Thana and New Market Thana of Dhaka.

In October, he was captured by the Pakistan military and Razakars while returning to India for more training. He was transferred to a jail in Mymensingh, where he was tortured and witnessed the mass execution of 39 Mukti Bahini prisoners by the Pakistan military. He was transferred to the residence of Dana Miah, which served as the local office of the East Pakistan Central Peace Committee. He was tortured there along with other members of the Mukti Bahini. He was able to escape from the camp.

=== War crime witness ===
Bulbul testified against convicted former Jamaat chief Ghulam Azam in the International Crimes Tribunal. Following the testimony as a witness, Bulbul's younger brother was killed, and his dead body was found near the Kuril overpass in Dhaka. Bulbul urged the government to ensure his security after the murder of his brother. He said that he had received death threats several times.

== Personal life and death ==
In 22nd January, 2019 Bulbul was taken to Universal Medical College and Hospital in Dhaka around 6:15 am, where the doctors declared him dead. He had suffered from cardiac arrest.

== Awards ==
- Ekushey Padak (2010)
- Bangladesh National Film Award for Best Music Director (2001, 2005)
- President's Award
- Shikha Anirban Award (the highest honour conferred by the Bangladesh Armed Forces)
- Bachsas Awards (11 times)
