= Akash Chhoa Bhalobasa =

Bangladeshi film

- VCD Cover
- Directed by: S A Haque Olike
- Written by: S A Haque Olike; Amzad Hossain
- Produced by: Vision
- Starring: Riaz; Purnima; Razzak; Sharmily Ahmed; Prabir Mitra; Afzal Sharif
- Cinematography: Alamgir Khoshru
- Edited by: Touhid Hossain Chowdhury
- Music by: Habib Wahid; S I Tutul
- Production company: BFDC
- Distributed by: Vision
- Release date: 24 October 2008
- Running time: 137 minutes
- Country: Bangladesh
- Language: Bengali

Akash Chhoa Bhalobasa (Bengali: আকাশ ছোঁয়া ভালোবাসা) is a Bangladeshi Bengali-language film. The film was released on 24 October 2008 all over Bangladesh.

== Cast ==
- Riaz as Akash
- Purnima as Chhoa
- Razzak as Mir Amzad Ali
- Sharmili Ahmed as Chhoa's Grand Mother
- Prabir Mitra as Chowdhury
- Afzal Sharif as Altu
- Nasrin as Special Appearance (Song-Dance)
- Jamilur Rahman Shakha as Chhoa's Servant
- Rehana Jolly as Chowdhury's Wife
- Diti as Minu Special Appearance (Akash's Mother)

== Music ==
Akash Chhoa Bhalobasa

Soundtrack album by Habib Wahid and S I Tutul
- Released: 2008 (Bangladesh)
- Recorded: 2007
- Genre: Feature film soundtrack
- Producer: Agniveena

=== Soundtrack ===
| Track | Title | Singers | Performers | Notes |
|---|---|---|---|---|
| 1 | Prithibir Joto Sukh | Habib Wahid and Nancy | Riaz and Purnima | |
| 2 | Hridoye Likhechhi Tomari Nam | S I Tutul and Samina Chowdhury | Riaz and Purnima | Title Song |
| 3 | Haway Haway Dolna Dole | Habib Wahid and Nancy | Riaz and Purnima | |
| 4 | Tumi Swapno Tumi Swargo | Subir Nandi and S I Tutul | Purnima, Razzak and Sharmily Ahmed | |
| 5 | Najor Na Lage Jeno | S I Tutul | Riaz and Purnima | |
| 6 | Bohupath Khuje Nadi Sagore Haray | S I Tutul | Riaz and Purnima | |
| 7 | Kancha Kancha Basher Bera | Kanak Chapa and S I Tutul | Riaz, Purnima, Nasrin and Masum Babul | |

== Awards ==
In 2008, Purnima was nominated for Best Film Actress in both the Critics' Choice and Viewers' Choice categories at the Meril-Prothom Alo Awards for her performance in Akash Chhoa Bhalobasa.
