= Premer Taj Mahal =

Bangladeshi film

- VCD Cover
- Directed by: Gazi Mahbub
- Written by: Gazi Jahangir
- Produced by: Gazi Mahbub Mohammad Josim uddin
- Starring: Riaz; Shabnur; Wasimul Bari Rajib; Abul Hayat; Misha Sawdagar; Anowar Hossain; Rawshan Zamil; Rasheda Chowdhury; Afzal Sharif; Neela
- Cinematography: Mahfuzur Rahman Khan
- Edited by: Zinnat Hossain
- Music by: Ahmed Imtiaz Bulbul
- Distributed by: Riya Kothachitra J.S production
- Release date: 2001
- Running time: 2h 26min
- Country: Bangladesh
- Language: Bengali
- Budget: 97 lakh
- Box office: 5 cror 58 lakh

Premer Taj Mahal (transl. The Taj Mahal of love) also (Bengali: প্রেমের তাজ মহল) is a Bangladeshi Bengali-language film. It was released in January 2002 in Bangladesh. It was directed by Gazi Mahbub and written by Gazi Jahangir. It was produced by Mohammad Jashim Uddin and distributed by Riya Kothachitra. The film is a family drama telling a deep love story. Stars include Riaz, Shabnur, Wasimul Bari Rajib, Abul Hayat, Misha Sawdagar, Anowar Hossain, Rawshan Zamil, Rasheda Chowdhury, and Afzal Sharif.

== Plot ==
Robyn (Riaz) and Liza (Shabnur) are in love. However, they appear unaware that they come from the same background. Their different religions also prevented them from marrying; Robyn is Muslim and Liza is Christian. When they take a step towards a love marriage, Liza goes to church. She is shocked to learn that Robyn is Muslim, and Robyn is shocked to learn that Liza is Christian. They separate, trying to forget each other. Instead, they soon get back together, determined to make it work. When their families learn about this situation, they take action. Due to previous business relations, Robyn's father Raihan Chowdhury (Abul Hayat) and Liza's father Abraham Dikosta (Wasimul Bari Rajib) start a conflict.

The final plot twist reveals that Liza is not the daughter of Abraham Dikosta. In fact, she was born into a Muslim family, and her birth father is Abdul Rahim (Anowar Hossain). One day, the full families of Abdul Rahim and Abraham Dikosta cross a river on a ferry. A cyclone causes the ferry to capsize, spilling everyone into the water. The survivors search for their family members. Meanwhile, Dikosta finds Rahim's baby, Alo. He took Alo with him. Rahim knew that Alo was alive. Many years later, Abdul Rahim encounters Dikosta by chance. Eventually, everyone learns the truth, and Robyn and Liza marry.

== Cast ==
- Riaz as Robyn Chowdhury
- Shabnur as Liza Dikosta (Alo)
- Wasimul Bari Rajib as Abraham Dikosta
- Abul Hayat as Raihan Chowdhury
- Rawshan Zamil as Liza's Grand Mother
- Rasheda Chowdhury as Robyn's Mother
- Afzal Sharif as Mintu
- Misha Sawdagar as Diferson Dikosta
- Neela as Neela
- Anowar Hossain as Abdur Rahim
- Nasrin as Special appearance
- Dulari Chakraborty
- Nimara Karim Risha

== Music ==
Premier Taj Mahal film's music is directed by Bangladeshi lyricist and composer Ahmed Imtiaz Bulbul. Monir Khan and Kanak Chapa won the National Film Awards for singer of the year in 2002. The song was "Ei Buke Boichhe Jamuna".

=== Soundtrack ===
Premer Taj Mahal

Soundtrack album
- Released: 2002 (Bangladesh)
- Recorded: 2001
- Genre: Films Sound Track
- Producer: ANUPAM

Track	Title	Singers	Performers	Notes
1	O Priya O Priya	Andrew Kishore and Kanak Chapa	Riaz and Shabnur	
2	Chhotto Ekta Jibon Niye	Andrew Kishore and Kanak Chapa	Riaz and Shabnur	
3	Didimoni O Didimoni	Kumar Biswajit, Kanak Chapa and ...	Rajib, Rawshan Zamil and Shabnur	
4	Ei Buke Boichhe Jamuna	Monir Khan and Kanak Chapa	Riaz and Shabnur	Title Song
5	Sathire Sathi Amar Ange	Biplob and ...	Misha Sawdagar and Nasrin	

== Awards ==
Premer Taj Mahal films won National Film Awards total of three categories in the year 2001:

- Best Music Director: Ahmed Imtiaz Bulbul, for the song Ei Buke Boichhe Jamuna.2001
- Best Male Playback Singer: Monir Khan, for the song Ei Buke Boichhe Jamuna.2001
- Best Female Playback singer: Kanak Chapa, for the song Ei Buke Boichhe Jamuna 2001
