= Riaz (actor) =

Bangladeshi actor

Riaz Ahmed
- রিয়াজ আহমেদ
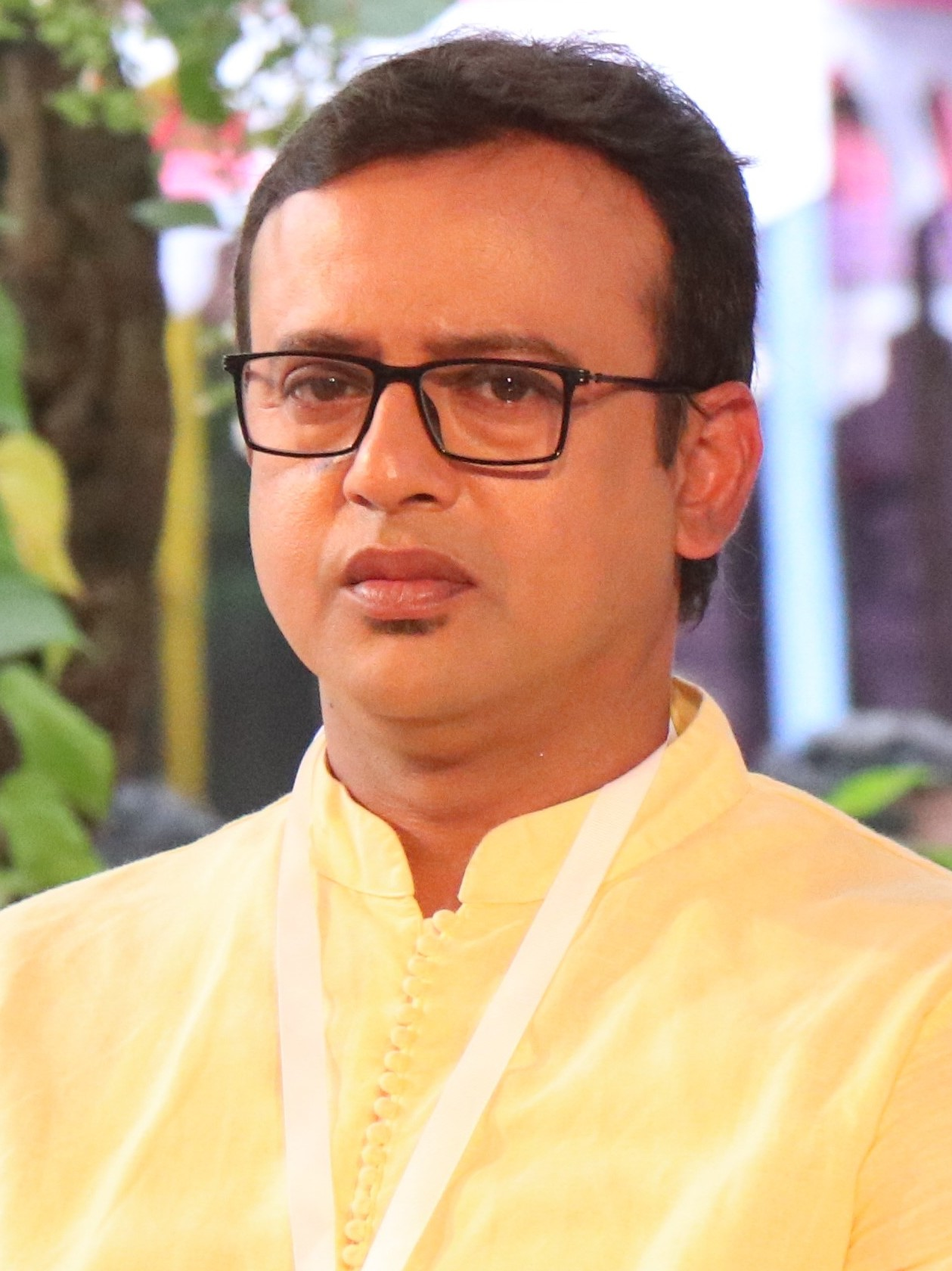
- Riaz in 2017
- Born: Riaz; 27 October 1974 (age 51); Faridpur, Bangladesh
- Occupation: Actor
- Years active: 1995–present
- Political party: Awami League
- Spouse: Mushfika Tina (m. 2007)
- Awards: Bangladesh National Film Awards (three times); Meril Prothom Alo Awards (seven times)
- Military service
- Allegiance: Bangladesh
- Branch: Bangladesh Air Force
- Service years: 1991–1993
- Rank: Flying officer

Riaz Uddin Ahamed Siddique (Bengali: রিয়াজ উদ্দিন আহমেদ সিদ্দিক, Bengali pronunciation: [ijad͡ʒ ud̪ in amed Siddique.ogg]; born 26 October 1974), popularly known as Riaz, is a Bangladeshi film actor, producer, and television presenter who has appeared in more than 100 Bengali films in genres ranging from romance to action to comedies. He is the recipient of numerous awards, including three National Film Awards and seven Meril Prothom Alo Awards. He portrayed the famous literary character, Shuvro, created by Humayun Ahmed, in Daruchini Dip.

His ability to play wide range of characters whether it was a man who is mad lover and ruins his life to finally win his darling girlfriend, a man who takes law into hand to punish evil people who killed his loved ones or harmed them, an innocent man who gets falsely accused in a crime as a punishment for loving the lady whose father does not approve of love, a comedy man gets into different disputes with his mother in law or his girlfriend and a recognizable person in the society, a kind man who become a criminal due to his life getting ruined by evil people, or various types of other characters such as a student who finally makes a music after struggling to with his schoolmates in the movie Daruchini Dwip.

From 1998 to 2010, his films such as Biyer Phul , national award-winning Dui Duari, Swapner Bashor ,Mayer Somman, E Badhon Jabena Chhire , Matir Phul, Shoshurbari Zindabad , Hridoyer Ayna , Premer Taj Mahal, Moner Majhe Tumi , Shyamol Chhaya , Molla Barir Bou, Shasti, Hajar Bachhor Dhore , Taka: The Ultimate Magic, Hridoyer Kotha , Na Bolona, another national award-winning Daruchini Dwip & Ki Jadu Korila, Megher Koley Rod , Akash Chhoa Bhalobasa, Chandragrohon & Ebadot, have helped him as in his Dhallywood career.

He decided to step down from the film industry in 2010 to focus on his family and business life. Since then, he has acted in a limited number of films and mostly focused on acting in various television dramas and telefilms.

Riaz first appeared onscreen as a side role in filmmaker Dewan Nazrul's social action drama Banglar Nayok (1995). He began a full-time career in film with a leading role in the highly successful romantic drama Praner Cheye Priyo (1997). In 2005, Riaz worked with Bollywood actress Susmita Sen for Mahesh Manjrekar's film It Was Raining That Night. His last movie "Krishnopokkho" was released on 26 February 2016, directed by Meher Afroz Shaon. Riaz briefly served in the Bangladesh Air Force before joining the film industry.

== Early life ==
Riaz was born in 1974 to a Muslim family in Faridpur District, Bangladesh. Riaz is the youngest child in his family. He has six sisters and a brother, Raisuddin Ahamed Siddique. He was brought up in CNB staff quarters of Faridpur for the first sixteen years of his life. His father, the late Zainuddin Ahamed Siddique, was a government service holder. His mother was Arjumand Ara Begum. His paternal home is in Jessore District.

== Career ==
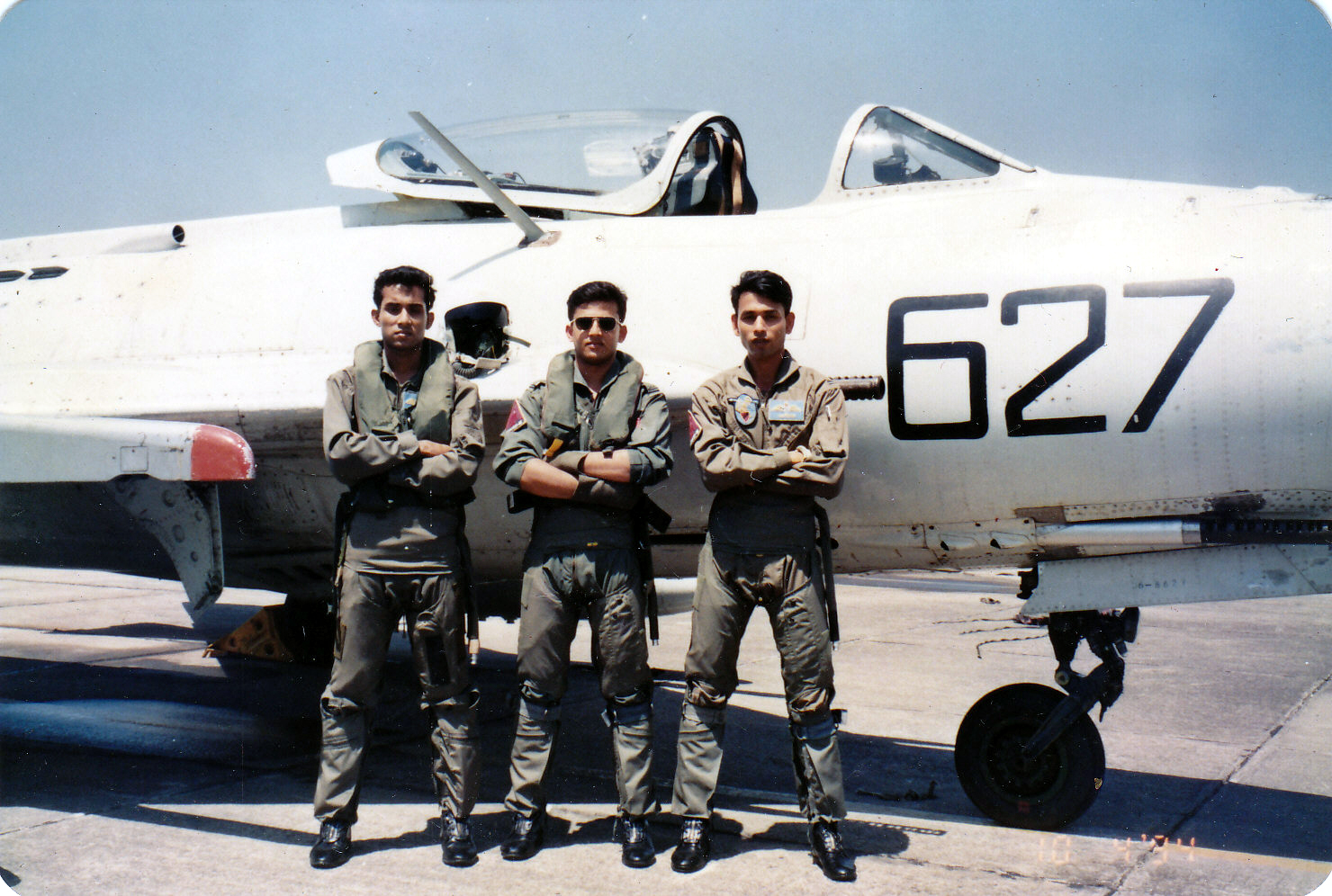
Riaz (center) with his colleagues of the Bangladesh Air Force

=== Military ===
Riaz participated in the examinations to be a pilot in the Bangladesh Air Force (BAF) right after his HSC results in 1988. He enrolled at the BAF Academy from 1989 to 1991 for flying training and to earn his bachelor's degree from the University of Rajshahi in science, he was commissioned as a pilot officer and became a fighter pilot in the Bangladesh Air Force in 1991. However, he was dismissed from the air force in 1993, he was promoted till flying officer rank.

=== Acting ===
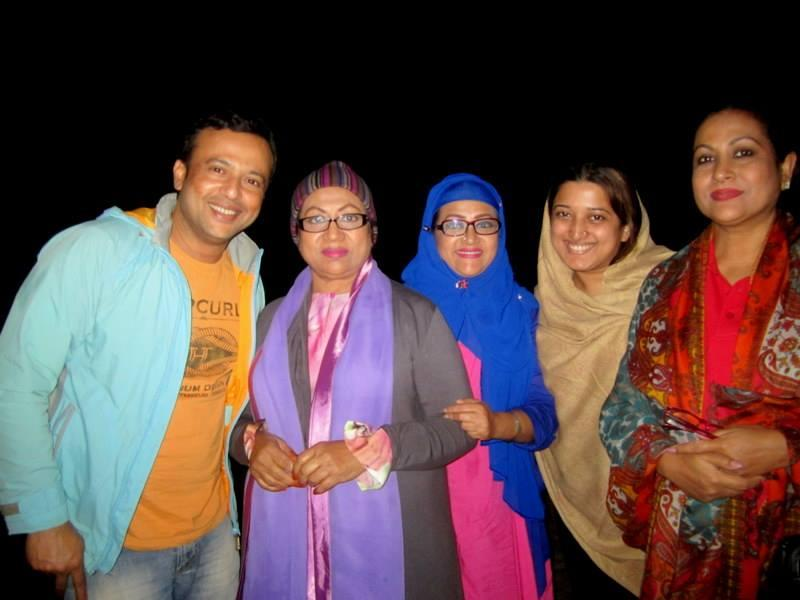
Riaz, Shuchanda, Bobita, Tina and Champa at Cox's Bazar in 2014

After withdrawal from the BAF, Riaz moved to Dhaka in 1994. There he met his cousin, actress Bobita, and started his film career in 1995. Riaz was in Dewan Nazrul's commercially successful 1995 film Banglar Nayok, although the movie did not bring him personal popularity. In 1997, Mohammad Hannan's romantic film Praner Cheye Priyo was an extraordinary commercial success, and Riaz became popular soon after. He works with many renowned filmmakers in Bangladesh and has acted in numerous films that have been commercially successful. He was also in filmmaker Mahesh Manjrekar's film It Was Raining That Night and has acted in the English language. In this film, he acted with Sushmita Sen for the first time. Now he has become a popular heartthrob to millions of people in the country.

Early in his career, Riaz played some romantic roles in films such as Praner Cheye Priyo, Hridoyer Aina (1997), Kajer Meye, Prithibi Tomar Amar, Bhalobasi Tomake (1998), Biyer Phul, Narir Mon (1999), E Badhon Jabena Chire, Nishwase Tumi Biswase Tumi, Bhownkor Bishu (2000), Hridoyer Bandhon, In 2002, he received his third Meril-Prothom Alo Award for Best Actor with Shahadat Hossain Liton's romance O Priya Tumi Kothay co-starring Shakib Khan for the first time, Premer Taj Mahal (2002), Moner Majhe Tumi (2003), Wrong Number (2004), Hridoyer Kotha (2006) and Akash Chhoa Bhalobasa (2008).

He has acted in some literary adaptations, and in his career he has portrayed many consecutive roles to wide critical acclaim in films such as Dui Duari (2000), Shasti: Punishment, Megher Pore Megh: Clouds After Cloud and Shyamol Chhaya: The Green Shadow (2004), Hajar Bachhor Dhore: Symphony of Agony (2005), Bidrohi Padma and Khelaghar: Dollhouse (2006), Daruchini Dip and Ekjon Songe Chhilo (2007), Megher Koley Rod: Sunshine in the Clouds, Ki Jadu Korila and Chandra Grohon: The Lunar Eclipse (2008), Ebadat: The Worship (2009) and Modhumoti (2011). Riaz also acted in Ogni Bolaka, a drama that is based on Birshreshtho Flight Lieutenant Matiur Rahman's life.

== Personal life ==
Riaz married Mushfika Tina, a TV host, also a dance teacher, in a traditional Muslim wedding ceremony on 18 December 2007.

He had two children with Mushfika Tina.

== Criticism ==
Riaz took a stand for the government during the repression of the Awami League government on the students in the quota reform movement that took place in 2024. During the movement, a group of "pro-autocracy" Awami artists, including Riaz, were active against the movement in a WhatsApp group called 'Alo Ashbei' led by actor Ferdous. After the non-cooperation movement, on September 3, 2024, some screenshots related to that WhatsApp group were spread on social media.

== Awards and nominations ==
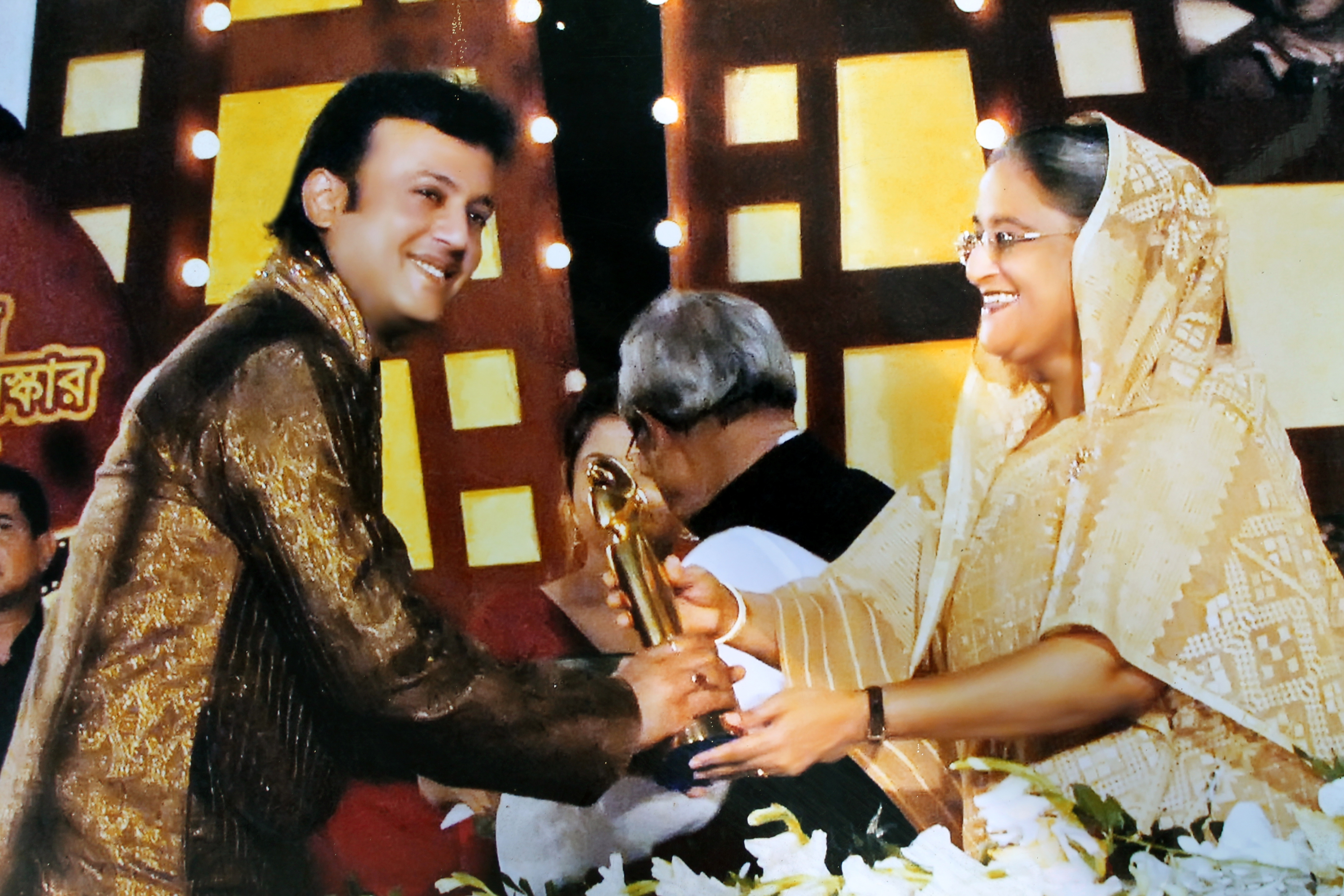
Riaz receiving the National Award 2008 from Prime Minister Sheikh Hasina in 2010

Riaz has received three National Film Awards for his unique contribution to the Bangladesh film industry. Acting for the films Dui Duari (2000) by Humayun Ahmed, Daruchini Dip (2007) by Tauquir Ahmed, and Ki Jadu Korila (2008) by Chandan Chowdhury.

=== National Film Awards ===
Winner

- Best Actor for Dui Duari – 2000
- Best Actor for Daruchini Dwip – 2007
- Best Actor for Ki Jadu Korila – 2008

=== Meril Prothom Alo Awards ===
Winner

- Best Actor for Praner Cheye Priyo – 1998
- Best Actor for Shashur Bari Zindabad – 2001
- Best Actor for Premer Taj Mahal – 2002
- Best Actor for Moner Majhe Tumi – 2003
- Best Actor for (Critics) Shasti: Punishment – 2004
- Best Actor (Critics) Hajar Bachhor Dhore: Symphony of Agony – 2005
- Best Actor for Hridoyer Kotha – 2006

== See also ==
- Dhallywood
- Bangladeshi film actor
- Cinema of Bangladesh
