= Manna filmography =

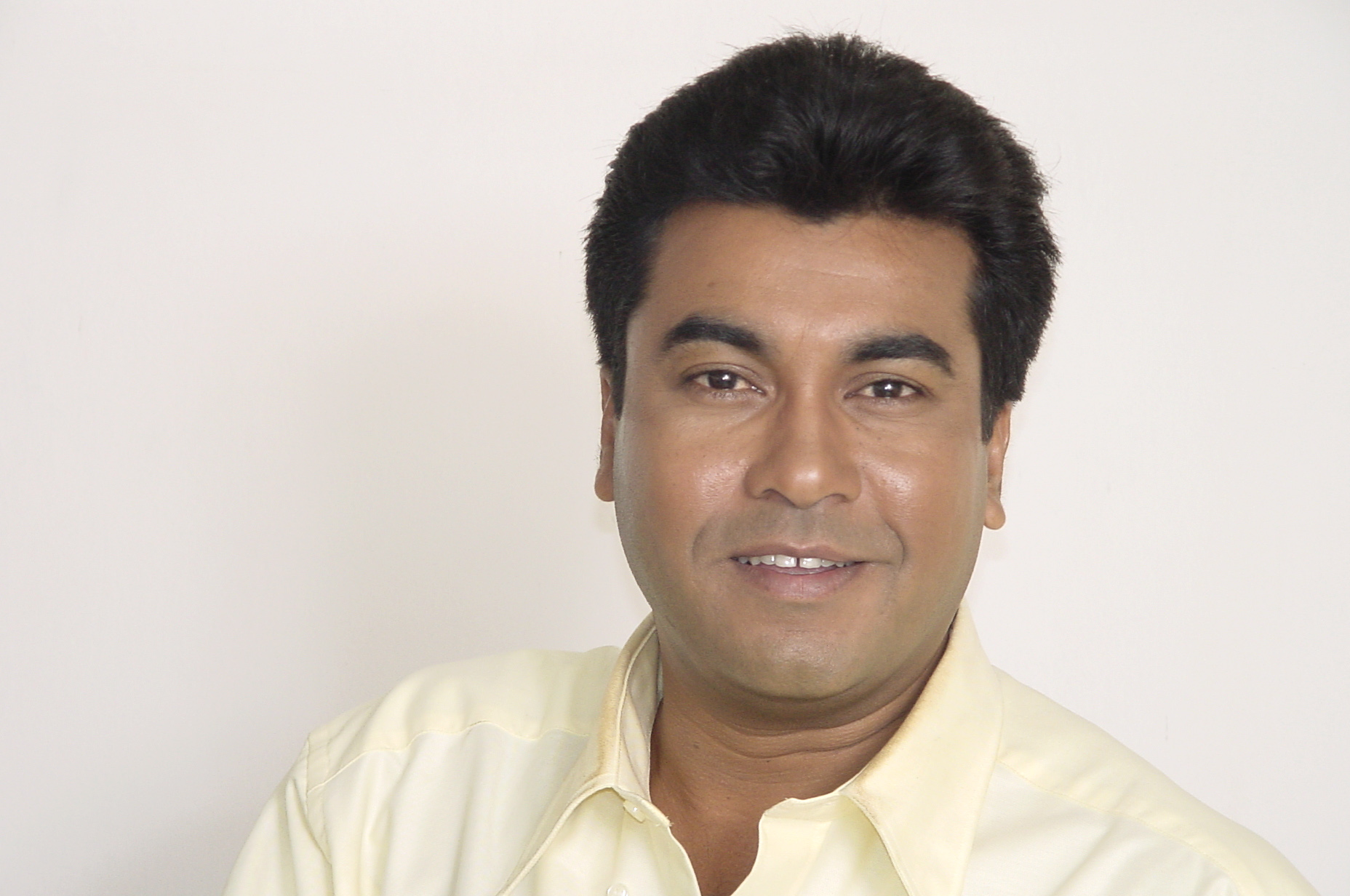
- Manna in 2007
- Film: 245

SM Aslam Talukder (14 April 1964 – 17 February 2008), known by his stage name Manna was a successful Bangladeshi film actor and producer.

In his 24 years career he has acted in more than three hundred films. He is called the latest Mahanayak of the Dhallywood Golden Era. One of the first films that brought him to attention was Danga (1992). Other commercially successful movies are Traash, Chadabaaz and Ammajan.

Montazur Rahman Akbar's Shanto Keno Mastan and Ke Amar Baba were released in 1998 and 1999. In 1999, the movie Ammajan directed by Kazi Hayat released. The film established Manna into a permanent position in Bangla film history as it was one of the most successful commercial films of Bengali film history.

On average, Manna acted in 10 films each year. Among films released last year, he played lead roles in commercially successful films including Saajghor, Khomotar Gorom, Moner Sathe Juddho, Machine Man, Ulta Palta 69 and Shotru Shotru Khela. Manna received several prestigious awards including a National Film Award for Best Actor in 2005.

As an action hero, Manna acted in collaboration with action director Kazi Hayat's 20 films & Montazur Rahman Akbar's 22 films.

== Filmography ==
| Year | Film | Role | Notes | Release date | Ref |
|---|---|---|---|---|---|
| 1986 | Pagli | Manik | Debut film; supporting role | 09.08.1985 | |
| 1986 | Fulshajya | Manna | Supporting role | 07.03.1986 | |
| 1986 | Touba | Rishad | First time stand on camera; supporting role | 10.06.1986 | |
| 1986 | Jarka | Walid | Supporting role | 10.06.1986 | |
| 1986 | Nishpap | Fayez | Cameo appearance; supporting role | 16.08.1986 | |
| 1986 | Aaj Tomar Kal Amar | Aslam | Supporting role | 28.11.1986 | |
| 1988 | Omor | Shakib | Supporting role | 18.05.1988 | |
| 1988 | Taka Poisha | Shahed | Supporting role | 25.07.1988 | |
| 1988 | Jontrona | Raju | Supporting role | 30.12.1988 | |
| 1988 | Bhai | Inspector Zahid | Supporting role | 17.07.1988 | |
| 1989 | Ghar Bari | | Supporting role | 03.11.1989 | |
| 1989 | Cobra | Munna | Supporting role | 20.11.1989 | |
| 1989 | Shakkhi Praman | Inspector Imran | Supporting role | 27.10.1989 | |
| 1990 | Shimul Parul | Karim | Supporting role | 05.01.1990 | |
| 1990 | Jadrel Bou | Dulal | Supporting role | 26.01.1990 | |
| 1990 | Agnipurush | | Supporting role | 02.02.1990 | |
| 1990 | Choto Bou | Bhuban | Supporting role | 09.02.1990 | |
| 1990 | Palki | Sujon | Supporting role | 25.05.1990 | |
| 1990 | Goriber Bou | | Supporting role | 01.06.1990 | |
| 1990 | Dukkhini Ma | Rahim | Supporting role | 17.08.1990 | |
| 1990 | Monikanchan | | Supporting role | 07.09.1990 | |
| 1991 | Badsha Bhai | Raju | Supporting role | 08.02.1991 | |
| 1991 | Strir Shopno | | Supporting role | 15.02.1991 | |
| 1991 | Kashem Malar Prem | Kashem | Debut in as lead role | 10.05.1991 | |
| 1991 | Ogni Tufan | Manna | | 06.09.1991 | |
| 1991 | Bap Beta 420 | Rony | | 13.12.1991 | |
| 1992 | Danga | OC Raju | | 24.01.1992 | |
| 1992 | Ruposhi Nagin | Shamu | | 05.04.1992 | |
| 1992 | Khoma | | | 05.04.1992 | |
| 1992 | Nagini Shapini | | | 01.05.1992 | |
| 1992 | Premer Mora Jole Dobe Na | | | 26.06.1992 | |
| 1992 | Goriber Bondhu | Inspector Sohel | | 17.07.1992 | |
| 1992 | Amar Jan | Bijoy | | 28.08.1992 | |
| 1992 | Alo Amar Alo | Hasan | | 04.09.1992 | |
| 1992 | Shadi Mobarak | | | 09.10.1992 | |
| 1992 | Gorom Hawa | Raja | | 06.11.1992 | |
| 1992 | Trash | Manna | | 18.12.1992 | |
| 1992 | Shantona | Inspector Hasan | | | |
| 1993 | Bhaiyer Ador | | | 08.01.1993 | |
| 1993 | Ondho Prem | Hasan | | 22.01.1993 | |
| 1993 | Ruper Rani Gaaner Raja | | | 29.01.1993 | |
| 1993 | Obujh Shontan | Hasan | | 25.03.1993 | |
| 1993 | Prem Diwana | Raja | | 23.04.1993 | |
| 1993 | Sottyobadi | | | 07.05.1993 | |
| 1993 | Shakkhat | Azad | | 02.06.1993 | |
| 1993 | Gohor Badsha Banessa Pori | | | 16.07.1993 | |
| 1994 | Shipahi | Raju | | 14.01.1994 | |
| 1994 | Disco Dancer | Agun | Released on Eid-ul-Fitr | 14.03.1994 | |
| 1994 | Jibon Diye Valobashi | | | 08.07.1994 | |
| 1994 | Desh Premik | Mirzan | | 19.08.1994 | |
| 1994 | Mohabhukompo | | | 18.11.1994 | |
| 1994 | Disco Baidani | Manna | | 23.12.1994 | |
| 1995 | Babar Adesh | Badsha | Manna's 50th film. Remake of Kiridam (1989). | 20.01.1995 | |
| 1995 | Andolon | Dukhain | | 07.04.1995 | |
| 1995 | Shesh Khela | Shahed | | 14.04.1995 | |
| 1995 | Shesh Shongram | | | 28.04.1995 | |
| 1995 | Ora Tin Jon | | | 16.06.1995 | |
| 1995 | Bishal Akromon | | | 30.06.1995 | |
| 1995 | Dushmoni | | | 07.07.1995 | |
| 1995 | Rajpother Raja | Raja | | 06.10.1995 | |
| 1995 | Shakkhi Praman | Inspector Imran | | 27.10.1995 | |
| 1996 | Ruti | Mastan | | 05.04.1996 | |
| 1996 | Khalnayak | Raja | | 14.06.1996 | |
| 1996 | Ajker Shontrashi | Rana | | 21.06.1996 | |
| 1996 | Bashira | Bashir | | 28.06.1996 | |
| 1996 | Chirorinee | | | 28.06.1996 | |
| 1996 | Jaaner Baji | | | 05.07.1996 | |
| 1996 | Atikrom | Rony | | 20.09.1996 | |
| 1997 | Jonotar Badsha | Badsha | Released on Eid-ul-Fitr | 09.02.1997 | |
| 1997 | Kolijar Tukra | | | 07.03.1997 | |
| 1997 | Premer Smriti | | | 04.04.1997 | |
| 1997 | Gunda Police | Raja | Released on Eid-ul-Adha | 18.04.1997 | |
| 1997 | Moha Sommelon | | | 30.05.1997 | |
| 1997 | Khudar Jala | | | 13.06.1997 | |
| 1997 | Amma | Don Mamun | | 11.07.1997 | |
| 1997 | Deshdrohi | Robi | | 29.08.1997 | |
| 1997 | Fashi | | | 29.08.1997 | |
| 1997 | Criminal | Raju | | 24.10.1997 | |
| 1997 | Loot Toraj | Manna | Debut as a producer | 07.11.1997 | |
| 1997 | Kando Keno Mon | | | 14.11.1997 | |
| 1997 | Manush | | | 28.11.1997 | |
| 1997 | Hatiar | | | 05.12.1997 | |
| 1998 | Desher Mati | | | 13.02.1998 | |
| 1998 | Mayer Kosom | | | 20.02.1998 | |
| 1998 | Matribhumi | Joggu | | 13.03.1998 | |
| 1998 | Sotyer Shongram | Sajib | | 27.03.1998 | |
| 1998 | Jemon Kormo Temon Fol | | Released on Eid-ul-Adha | 08.04.1998 | |
| 1998 | Mukti Chai | | | 29.05.1998 | |
| 1998 | Teji | Robi | | 05.06.1998 | |
| 1998 | Mrittudata | | | 12.06.1998 | |
| 1998 | Bhai | Inspector Zahid | | 17.07.1998 | |
| 1998 | Shanto Keno Mastan | Shanto | Remake of Ziddi (1997). | 31.07.1998 | |
| 1998 | Shesh Protikkha | | | 07.08.1998 | |
| 1998 | Ondho Ain | Raju | | 04.09.1998 | |
| 1998 | Desh Dorodi | Robi | Remake of Walter Vetrivel (1993). | 04.09.1998 | |
| 1998 | Raja Bangladeshi | Raja | | 16.10.1998 | |
| 1998 | Etim Raja | Raja | | 11.12.1998 | |
| 1999 | Ke Amar Baba | Jibon | Released on Eid-ul-Fitr | 19.01.1999 | |
| 1999 | Mostofa Bhai | Mostofa | Released on Eid-ul-Fitr. Remake of Anna (1994). | 19.01.1999 | |
| 1999 | Bhondo Baba | | Released on Eid-ul-Adha | 29.03.1999 | |
| 1999 | Gondo Dholai | Robin | Released on Eid-ul-Adha | 29.03.1999 | |
| 1999 | Gorib Keno Kade | | | 16.04.1999 | |
| 1999 | Dushmon Duniya | Masud | Manna's 100th film | 11.06.1999 | |
| 1999 | Khabar Ache | | | 11.06.1999 | |
| 1999 | Ammajan | Badsha | | 25.06.1999 | |
| 1999 | Tokai Rongbaz | | | 23.07.1999 | |
| 1999 | Raja | Raja | Double role. Remake of Thenmavin Kombath (1994). | 13.08.1999 | |
| 1999 | Shokter Bhokto | | | 20.08.1999 | |
| 1999 | Lal Badsha | Badsha | Film produced by Manna | 27.08.1999 | |
| 1999 | Lathi | Raju | | 10.09.1999 | |
| 1999 | Chokranter Shikar | | | 08.10.1999 | |
| 1999 | Moron Kamor | | | 15.10.1999 | |
| 1999 | Dhor | Apu | | 05.11.1999 | |
| 1999 | Parle Thekao | | | 26.11.1999 | |
| 2000 | Raja Number One | Raja | Released on Eid-ul-Fitr | 09.01.2000 | |
| 2000 | Cheater Number One | | Released on Eid-ul-Fitr | 09.01.2000 | |
| 2000 | Gunda Number One | Nazrul | Released on Eid-ul-Fitr | 09.01.2000 | |
| 2000 | Raju Mastan | Raju | | 11.02.2000 | |
| 2000 | Teji Shontan | Swapon / Boro Bhai | | 25.02.2000 | |
| 2000 | Najayez | | | 03.03.2000 | |
| 2000 | Koshto | Musa | Released on Eid-ul-Adha | 17.03.2000 | |
| 2000 | Hridoy Niye Juddho | | | 14.04.2000 | |
| 2000 | Jhor | Monwar | | 28.04.2000 | |
| 2000 | Baba Mastan | | | 12.05.2000 | |
| 2000 | Kala Kafon | | | 06.09.2000 | |
| 2000 | Bortoman | Babul / Kabir | Remake of Vaastav: The Reality (1999). | 22.09.2000 | |
| 2000 | Amar Protigya | | | 06.10.2000 | |
| 2000 | Jummon Koshai | Jummon | | 27.10.2000 | |
| 2000 | Killer | Shadhin | Released on Eid-ul-Fitr | 28.12.2000 | |
| 2000 | Kukhyat Khuni | Ali Akbar / Nazrul | Released on Eid-ul-Fitr | 28.12.2000 | |
| 2001 | Abbaajaan | Ali Akbar / Akbar | Released on Eid-ul-Adha. Film produced by Manna. Remake of Mustafa (1996). | 07.03.2001 | |
| 2001 | Panja | Ahmed | Released on Eid-ul-Adha. Remake of Om (1995). | 07.03.2001 | |
| 2001 | Top Terror | | Released on Eid-ul-Adha | 07.03.2001 | |
| 2001 | Bheja Biral | Polash | | 18.05.2001 | |
| 2001 | Jonmo Shotru | | | 15.06.2001 | |
| 2001 | Tandoblila | Hannu | | 22.06.2001 | |
| 2001 | Bidrohi Mastan | | | 27.07.2001 | |
| 2001 | Gonodushmon | Iqbal / Badsha | | 03.08.2001 | |
| 2001 | Rongbaz Badsha | Badsha | | 24.08.2001 | |
| 2001 | Mohashongram | | | 14.09.2001 | |
| 2001 | Imandar Mastan | | | 21.09.2001 | |
| 2002 | Shesh Bongshodhor | Proloy | Bangladesh-India co-production. Released in Kolkata as 'Bongshodhor'. | 18.01.2002 | |
| 2002 | Bhoyankor Shongghorsho | Noyon / Manik | Released on Eid-ul-Adha | 23.02.2002 | |
| 2002 | Major Saheb | Andolon | Released on Eid-ul-Adha | 23.02.2002 | |
| 2002 | Nayak | Raju / Boma Manik | Released on Eid-ul-Adha | 23.02.2002 | |
| 2002 | Oshanto Agun | Agun | | 15.03.2002 | |
| 2002 | Shesh Juddho | Joy / Hakka | Double role. Bangladesh-India co-production. Released in Kolkata as 'Eri Naam Bhalobasha'. | 29.03.2002 | |
| 2002 | Shami Strir Juddho | Rajib | Film produced by Manna. Remake of Anuraaga Aralithu (1986). | 05.04.2002 | |
| 2002 | Shomajke Bodle Dao | Inspector Sagar | | 19.04.2002 | |
| 2002 | Fire | Rana | Manna's 150th film | 03.05.2002 | |
| 2002 | Alibaba | Ali | | 24.05.2002 | |
| 2002 | Khato Bikhato | Raju | | 31.05.2002 | |
| 2002 | Chorom Opoiman | Agun | Remake of Raja (1995). | 28.06.2002 | |
| 2002 | Boma Hamla | | | | |
| 2002 | Arman | Armanuzzaman | Remake of Dhool (2001). | 28.06.2002 | |
| 2002 | Mastaner Upor Mastan | Biplob | | 16.08.2002 | |
| 2002 | Ora Bhoyonkor | | | 13.09.2002 | |
| 2003 | Shotyer Bijoy | Robi | Released on Eid-ul-Adha. Remake of Damini (1993). | 12.02.2003 | |
| 2003 | Bir Soinik | Abdullah | Released on Eid-ul-Adha. Winner: National Film Award for Best Actor | 12.02.2003 | |
| 2003 | Shotyo Mithyar Lorai | | | 04.04.2003 | |
| 2003 | Dui Bodhu Ek Shami | Hridoy | Film produced by Manna | 11.04.2003 | |
| 2003 | Minister | Sagar | Unofficial remake of Mudhalvan (1999). | 16.05.2003 | |
| 2003 | Villain | Hira / Raju | | 06.06.2003 | |
| 2003 | Big Boss | Shubho | | 04.07.2003 | |
| 2003 | Kothin Shimar | Durjoy | | 18.07.2003 | |
| 2003 | Badsha Keno Chakar | Badsha | | 15.08.2003 | |
| 2003 | Top Samrat | Samrat | | 19.09.2003 | |
| 2003 | Baba | | | 03.10.2003 | |
| 2003 | Bastob | Duronto | Released on Eid-ul-Fitr | 26.11.2003 | |
| 2003 | Rustom | Rustom | Released on Eid-ul-Fitr | 26.11.2003 | |
| 2004 | Bap Betar Lorai | Arif | Released on Eid-ul-Adha | 02.02.2004 | |
| 2004 | Abbas Darwan | Abbas | | 20.02.2004 | |
| 2004 | Kothin Purush | Shanto | | 05.03.2004 | |
| 2004 | Jibon Ek Shongghorsho | Biplob | | 26.03.2004 | |
| 2004 | Bhaiyer Shotru Bhai | OC Robi | | 02.04.2004 | |
| 2004 | Rajdhani | Aslam | | 14.05.2004 | |
| 2004 | Uttorer Khepe | Haider | | 04.06.2004 | |
| 2004 | Bidrohi Saluddin | Saluddin | | 18.06.2004 | |
| 2004 | Bagher Bachcha | Samrat | | 06.09.2004 | |
| 2004 | Teji Purush | Biplob | Remake of Bhagavathi (2002). | 23.07.2004 | |
| 2004 | Sultan | Raja / Sultan | Remake of Guru (2003) | 12.10.2004 | |
| 2004 | Swami Chhintai | Rana | Released on Eid-ul-Fitr | 15.11.2004 | |
| 2004 | Manna Bhai | Manna | Released on Eid-ul-Fitr | 15.11.2004 | |
| 2004 | Amader Shontan | Azad | Released on Eid-ul-Fitr. Remake of Varavu Nalla Uravu (1990). | 15.11.2004 | |
| 2004 | Bachao Desh | | | 31.12.2004 | |
| 2005 | Gaddari | Anondo | Released on Eid-ul-Adha | 22.01.2005 | |
| 2005 | Jiddi Driver | Nijom | Released on Eid-ul-Adha | 22.01.2005 | |
| 2005 | City Terror | Shanto | | 29.07.2005 | |
| 2005 | Ek Rokha | Shongram | Remake of Samba (2004). | 02.09.2005 | |
| 2005 | Ami Jel Theke Bolchhi | Omar Faruk | Released on Eid-ul-Fitr. Film produced by Manna. Remake of Ganapathi (2002). | 04.11.2005 | |
| 2005 | Shotrushi Munna | Munna | Released on Eid-ul-Fitr. Remake of Rishtey (2002). | 04.11.2005 | |
| 2005 | Jora Khun | | Released on Eid-ul-Fitr | 04.11.2005 | |
| 2005 | Protibadi Master | | | 09.12.2005 | |
| 2006 | E Desh Kar? | | Released on Eid-ul-Adha | 11.01.2006 | |
| 2006 | Mayer Morjada | Rajib | Released on Eid-ul-Adha | 11.01.2006 | |
| 2006 | Ronangon | Ovi | Bangladesh-India co-production | 31.03.2006 | |
| 2006 | Jiboner Golpo | Panna | Manna's 200th film | 12.05.2006 | |
| 2006 | Ami Ekai Eksho | OC Raju | | 26.05.2006 | |
| 2006 | Goriber Dada | Biplob | | 02.06.2006 | |
| 2006 | Dafon | | Double role | 16.06.2006 | |
| 2006 | Dapot | Nosib | Unofficial remake of Okkadu (2003). | 21.07.2006 | |
| 2006 | Kabuliwala | Rahmat Sheikh | Based on Rabindranath Tagore's short story | 04.08.2006 | |
| 2006 | Thanda Mathar Khuni | Andar | Played both hero and villain roles | 11.08.2006 | |
| 2006 | Tokaiyer Hate Oshtro Keno | | | 01.09.2006 | |
| 2006 | Neta | Munna | | 08.09.2006 | |
| 2006 | Banglar Hero | Agun | Released on Eid-ul-Fitr | 25.10.2006 | |
| 2006 | Matha Noshto | Raju / Nera Mastan | Released on Eid-ul-Fitr | 25.10.2006 | |
| 2007 | Rickshawalar Prem | Emon | Released on Eid-ul-Adha | 01.01.2007 | |
| 2007 | Musa Bhai | Musa / Musa Bhai | Released on Eid-ul-Adha | 01.01.2007 | |
| 2007 | Dhoka | Zahid Jubayer / Abul | Released on Eid-ul-Adha. Remake of Tamil film Ghajini (2005). | 01.01.2007 | |
| 2007 | Sajghor | Asif | | 13.04.2007 | |
| 2007 | Jomdut | Manna | | 01.06.2007 | |
| 2007 | Khomotar Gorom | Rana | | 13.07.2007 | |
| 2007 | Moner Sathe Juddho | Raju | Released on Eid-ul-Fitr. Film produced by Manna. | 14.10.2007 | |
| 2007 | Mayer Bodla | Galib | | 02.11.2007 | |
| 2007 | Babar Kosom | Biplob | Remake of Ashok (2006). | 09.11.2007 | |
| 2007 | Ei Je Duniya | Biru | | 16.11.2007 | |
| 2007 | Machine Man | Inspector Pavel | Released on Eid-ul-Adha | 21.12.2007 | |
| 2007 | Ulta Palta 69 | Durjoy / Bijoy | Released on Eid-ul-Adha. Double role. Remake of Vikramarkudu (2006). | 21.12.2007 | |
| 2007 | Shotru Shotru Khela | Sagar | Released on Eid-ul-Adha | 21.12.2007 | |
| 2008 | Obujh Shishu | Sagar | Released posthumously | 22.02.2008 | |
| 2008 | Shreshtho Shontan | Hiroshima / Shiba | Released posthumously | 29.02.2008 | |
| 2008 | Ma Babar Shopno | Akash | Released posthumously | 14.03.2008 | |
| 2008 | Valobashar Dushmon | Advocate Raja | Released posthumously | 04.04.2008 | |
| 2008 | Babar Jonno Juddho | Babu | Released posthumously | 09.05.2008 | |
| 2008 | Dui Diner Duniya | Manna | Released posthumously | 23.05.2008 | |
| 2008 | Aslam Bhai | Aslam Bhai | Released posthumously; Double role | 25.07.2008 | |
| 2008 | Boroloker Jamai | Agun | Released posthumously | 02.10.2008 | |
| 2008 | Chakorer Prem | Manna | Released posthumously | 07.11.2008 | |
| 2009 | Power | Raju | Released posthumously | 21.11.2008 | |
| 2009 | Jogot Shongshar | Sultan | Released posthumously | 02.01.2009 | |
| 2009 | Jibon Niye Juddho | Shokti | Released posthumously | 30.01.2009 | |
| 2009 | Hridoy Theke Pawa | Sohel | Released posthumously; Remake of American film John Q. (2002) | 06.03.2009 | |
| 2010 | Pita Matar Amanot | Munna | Released posthumously; also as producer, Remake of Telugu filmLakshmi (2006) | 09.12.2008 | |
| 2010 | Doriya Parer Douloti | Goni | Released posthumously | 29.01.2010 | |
| 2010 | Mogol-E-Azam | Alam / Selim | Released posthumously | 15.10.2010 | |
| 2011 | Noshto Jibon | Raj | Released posthumously | 04.02.2011 | |
| TBA | Jibon Jontrona | TBA | Last film; unreleased | | |
