= Abbajan =

- Film poster
- Directed by: Kazi Hayat
- Screenplay by: Kazi Hayat
- Starring: Manna; Sathi; Wasimul Bari Rajib
- Music by: Ahmed Imtiaz Bulbul
- Release date: 2001
- Running time: 165 minutes
- Country: Bangladesh
- Language: Bengali

Abbajan is a 2001 Bangladeshi film directed by Kazi Hayat. It stars Manna and Sathi in lead roles. The film was a remake of the Tamil film Musthaffaa (1996).

== Cast ==
- Manna
- Sathi
- Kazi Hayat
- Asif Iqbal
- Nasreen
- Dulari
- Keya
- Kabila
- Ahmed Sharif
- Misha Sawdagor
- Wasimul Bari Rajib

== Soundtrack ==
The film's music was written by Ahmed Imtiaz Bulbul.

=== Soundtrack ===
| Track | Song | Singer | Notes |
|---|---|---|---|
| 1 | Abbajan | Biplob | |
| 2 | Ishwar Allah Bidhata Jaane | Monir Khan and Kanak Chapa | |
| 3 | Tomar Moronkale | Kanak Chapa | |
| 4 | Duniyare Duniya | Biplob and Bipasha | |
| 5 | Chhoto Chhoto Bachcha Fereshta | Kanak Chapa | |

== Awards and nominations ==
Meril Prothom Alo Awards

| Year | Nominated | Category | Result | ref |
|---|---|---|---|---|
| 2001 | Manna | Best Actor | Nominated | |

Bachsas Awards

| Year | Nominated | Category | Result | ref |
|---|---|---|---|---|
| 2001 | Manna | Best Actor | Won | |
