= Sakkhi Proman =

Bangladeshi film

- Directed by: Belal Ahmed
- Screenplay by: Belal Ahmed
- Story by: Belal Ahmed
- Produced by: United Pictures'
- Starring: Manna; Sathi; Amit Hasan; Sabrina; Wasimul Bari Rajib
- Cinematography: A. R. Jahangir
- Edited by: Saiful Islam
- Music by: Ahmed Imtiaz Bulbul(songs, score and lyrics)
- Release date: 1989
- Running time: 125 minutes
- Country: Bangladesh
- Language: Bengali

Sakkhi Proman is a Bangladeshi film directed by Belal Ahmed. Manna, Sathi, Sabrina and Amit Hasan are in lead roles.

== Synopsis ==
The film's story is about an honest police officer and lawyer who struggles hard to protect a witness from the criminals.

== Cast ==
- Manna
- Sathi
- Amit Hasan
- Sabrina
- Wasimul Bari Rajib
- Mizu Ahmed
- Nasir Khan
- Siraj Haider
- Danny Raj
- Syed Akhtar Ali
- Amjad Hossain
- Morjina

== Music ==
The film's songs have been both composed and penned by Ahmed Imtiaz Bulbul.

- "Amar Hater Chotpoti Aar Phuchka" - Baby Naznin
- "Tumi Aar Ami" - Khalid Hasan Milu, Salma Jahan
- "Churi Baaje Jhun Jhun Jhun" - Agun, Jhumu Khan
- "Tomar Omor Naam" (version 1) - Khalid Hasan Milu, Shakila Zafar
- "Tomar Omor Naam" (version 2) - Khalid Hasan Milu, Shakila Zafar
- "Keu Kande Keu Hase" (version 1) - Khalid Hasan Milu, Salma Jahan
- "Keu Kande Keu Hase" (version 2) - Khalid Hasan Milu, Samina Chowdhury
- "Amake Buke Niye Dekho" - Runa Laila
- "Target, Tumi Je Target" - Runa Laila
