= Thekao Mastan =

Bangladeshi action film

- Movie poster
- Directed by: Malek Afsari
- Screenplay by: Malek Afsari; Dialogue B.H. Shahin
- Story by: B.H. Shahin
- Produced by: Pawan Kumar Agarwal; Malek Afsari
- Starring: Shakib Khan; Shamsunnahar Shimla; Amin Khan; Munmun; Afzal Sharif; Monwar Hossain Dipjol
- Cinematography: M.A. Bukhari
- Edited by: Chishti Jamal
- Music by: Ali Akram Shuvo
- Production company: Panna Movies
- Distributed by: Panna Movies
- Release date: 18 May 2001
- Running time: 151 minutes (YouTube version)
- Country: Bangladesh
- Language: Bengali

Thekao Mastan is a 2001 Bangladeshi action film directed and co-produced Malek Afsari with Pawan Kumar Agarwal under the banner of Panna Movies. It features an ensemble cast including Shakib Khan, Shamsunnahar Shimla, Amin Khan, Munmun, Rosy Afsari, Afzal Sharif, Monwar Hossain Dipjol, Nasir Khan, Dildar and Don.

The soundtrack album is composed by Ali Akram Shuvo. The film editing was by Chishti Jamal and cinematography done by M.A. Bukhari, while choreography was handled by Iran Ahmed, Saif Khan, Saiful and Aziz Reza. It was the second collaboration between Shakib Khan and Malek Afsari. It was a commercial success and was a hit at the box office. The film was criticized for some crude and vulgar scenes. However, the actors received critical acclaim for their performances. The film marked as the first time appearance of any director on the poster.

== Plot ==
Biplob (Shakib Khan) is a patriotic and honest police officer. He declared war on corruption and terrorism. He loves a girl named Shimla. Shimla is a journalist by profession.

Meanwhile, Dhaka's notorious terrorist Dipu Sardar (Dipjol) takes a bath in a broken bucket every Friday, eats rice in a broken bowl and sleeps with a brick under his head every Friday to remember the pain he suffered during his 14-year jail term in the past. But Dipu Sardar kills Sonali's (Munmun) father and an honest minister of Rangamati, and rapes and murders a journalist named Kalyani! When Biplob went to arrest Dipu Sardar for this crime, Bipllb became an enemy of Dipu Sardar. As a result, Dipu Sardar beat Biplob and his lover and injured him. On the other hand, college student Sonali (Munmun) falls in love with movie ticket blacker Durjoy (Amin Khan).

After Sonali got into trouble with Dipu Sardar's brother Nanna Sardar (Mafia) over the college election, Nanna Sardar threatened to expose her. Then Sonali took refuge in Durjoy to escape from Nanna. But Nanna killed Durjoy's mother by plotting Durjoy and handing him over to the police. Then when Nanna tries to kill Sonali by setting her on fire, a neighbor girl named Jumka, who loves Durjoy, saves Sonali with her life. Later, Durjoy became enraged and killed Nanna by burning her. Then Biplob and Durjoy combined to destroy all the bad deeds and illegal business of Dipu Sardar. After killing Dipu Sardar and all his goons, Durjoy, Biplob, Shimla and Sonali went to jail. They came out of jail after a few years.

== Cast ==
- Shakib Khan as Biplob
- Shimla as Shimla, Journalist
- Amin Khan as Durjoy
- Munmun as Sonali
- Afzal Sharif -
- Dildar as Qutub
- Nasir Khan as Police official
- Monwar Hossain Dipjol as Dipu Sardar
- Rosy Afsari as Durjoy's mother
- Don as Dipu Sardar's goons
- Mafia as Nanna Sardar, Dipu Sardar's younger brother
- Jhumka as Special appearance

== Soundtrack ==
Thekao Mastan

Soundtrack album by Ali Akram Shuvo
- Released: 1 January 2005
- Studio: Panna Movies
- Genre: Feature Film Soundtrack
- Length: 26:00
- Language: Bengali
- Label: SB Cinema Hall
- Producer: Ali Akram Shuvo

Ali Akram Shuvo chronology
Naachnewali (2001)	Thekao Mastan (2001)	O Priya Tumi Kothay (2002)

The soundtrack album of the film is composed by Ali Akram Shuvo with all of song penned Moniruzzaman Monir, which consisting six songs.

No.	Title	Singer(s)	Length
1.	"Ango Mitha Angur"	Andrew Kishore, Runa Laila	4:38
2.	"Bashor Raat Modhur Raat"	Andrew Kishore, Sabina Yasmin	4:27
3.	"Dhal Tora Dhal"	Khan Asifur Rahman Agun	4:06
4.	"Ekta Meye Ekta Chele"	Andrew Kishore, Sabina Yasmin	4:49
5.	"Eto Prem Re"	Andrew Kishore, Runa Laila	4:50
6.	"Janu Re Janu"	Biplob, Sabina Yasmin	4:45
Total length:			26:00

== Release ==
The film was a commercial success and a hit at the box office. It was criticized for some crude and vulgar scenes. However, the actors received critical acclaim for their performances.
