= Ananta Prem Tumi Dao Aamake =

1997 Bangladeshi film song

- Cover of singles

Song by Ayub Bachchu and Kanak Chapa

from the album Lut toraj
- Language: Bengali
- Released: Audio: 1997; Video: April 28, 2018
- Recorded: 1997
- Venue: Dhaka
- Genre: Film score
- Length: 4:52
- Label: Anupam Recording Media (2018-present)
- Songwriter: Ahmed Imtiaz Bulbul
- Producer: Ahmed Imtiaz Bulbul

Music video
- "Ananta Prem Tumi Dao Aamake" on YouTube

"Ananta Prem Tumi Dao Aamake" (Bengali: অনন্ত প্রেম তুমি দাও আমাকে, lit. 'You Give Eternal Love to Me') is a Bengali-language romantic song recorded by Ayub Bachchu and Kanak Chapa. The song was used in the 1997 film Loot Toraj, directed by Kazi Hayat. in which it was lip-synced by actors Manna and Moushumi. The lyrics and music were written by Ahmed Imtiaz Bulbul. The song marked Bachchu's debut as a playback singer in Bengali films.

== Background ==
Loot Toraj was the first film produced by Manna, who presented Kazi Hayat, the film's director, with an idea to have Ayub Bachchu sing an original song in the film to surprise the audience. Ahmed Imtiaz Bulbul supported Manna in this endeavour. However, he was not optimistic that this overture would be well received, as Ayub never intended to do playback singing in genres other than Bangladeshi rock. After Manna's keen interest and repeated requests, Bachchu agreed to record the song for the film.

== Production ==
Bulbul was the music producer for the film's songs and score, and wrote the lyrics and music of "Ananta Prem Tumi Dao Aamake" after Bachchu agreed to participate. Bulbul prioritised Bachchu's singing style in the composition. The song is sung in a high vocal range. Bachchu was used to such songs, but his counterpart Kanak Chapa was not used to lend her voice for high notes; her husband was worried about her singing a duet with Bachchu.

== Release and reception ==
"Ananta Prem Tumi Dao Aamake" was simultaneously released with the film in 1997 and was well received by the audience; many fans of Bachchu's Bangladeshi rock watched the film in theaters just to hear this song. This song is regularly aired in Bangladesh Betar's film-music programming. Before giving up playback singing, Bachchu regularly performed this song at the request of the audience in his concerts, and it represented Bachchu's successful foray into the world of film music outside rock and musical bands. A music video was released on YouTube on 28 April 2018, twenty-one years after the film's release, under the banner of Anupam Recording Media.
