= Ammajan =

Bangladeshi crime drama film

- Movie poster
- Directed by: Kazi Hayat
- Written by: Monowar Hossain Dipjol; Kazi Hayat
- Produced by: Monowar Hossain Dipjol
- Starring: Shabnam; Manna; Moushumi; Amin Khan; Monwar Hossain Dipjol; Mizu Ahmed
- Cinematography: Harun Al Rashid
- Edited by: Amzad Hossain
- Music by: Ahmed Imtiaz Bulbul
- Distributed by: Ami Boni Kothachitra
- Release date: 25 June 1999
- Running time: 137 minutes
- Country: Bangladesh
- Language: Bengali
- Budget: ৳1.04 crore (equivalent to ৳5.2 crore or US$420,000 in 2024)
- Box office: ৳20 crore (equivalent to ৳99 crore or US$8.2 million in 2024)

Ammajan (lit. 'Dear Mother') is a Bangladeshi Bengali-language crime-drama film directed by Kazi Hayat and written by Monwar Hossain Dipjol. The film was released in 1999 in Bangladesh. It was produced by Dipjol. It stars Manna, Shabnam, Moushumi, Amin Khan, and Dipjol in lead roles.

Ammajan became a massive commercial success and is the 7th highest-grossing Bangladeshi films of all time. Manna’s performance was hugely praised, particularly his role as an anti-hero the first time on screen. The title song, Ammajan, performed by Ayub Bachchu, became a cultural phenomenon, cementing the film’s legacy in popular culture.

== Plot ==
Badshah (Manna) is a teenager whose father is Laal Mia, an electrician. His father suddenly dies in an electric accident. The family faces tremendous scarcity in the absence of their only earning member. His mother, whom he calls Ammajaan (Shabnam), seeks pension money for her husband in his office. She is sent to the house of a top class officer of that office assuring that that officer may donate her some money. In the house, the officer eventually rapes her. Discovering her mother was molested, Badshah becomes wrathful and kills that officer by stabbing him with a Vojaali (dagger). He and his mother are punished by 14 years imprisonment. After 22 years Badshah becomes a criminal kingpin, but his wealth cannot make his mother happy. She never talks with her son due to that shameful event of her past. Badshah is extremely obedient to his mother, and works as a vigilante who brutally punishes rapists and woman-molesters.

During a relief work for floods, Ammajaan sees Rina, a young university student who is the daughter of ex-minister Aziz Ahmed (Miju Ahmed). She is engaged to her lover, Mijan (Amin Khan). Ammajaan wishes for a daughter-in-law like her. Hearing this, Badshah chases Rina to her house and demands that they be wedded. Aziz Ahmed gets frightened, and summons Kalam (Dipjol), a notorious gangster, who was once Badshah's friend. Kalam threatens Badshah, but is unsuccessful. Meanwhile, Badshah rescues a raped girl, Kusum, and has her engaged with his best friend Nabab. Kalam employs a thug to plant a time bomb in Badshah's car. During an outing in the car, the bomb blasts with Kusum inside, taking her life. But Badshah and Nabab survive by luck.

Badshah is informed by his old mate Siddhi Faruk, a weapons dealer that Kalam was the culprit behind this. Badshah seeks revenge by hunting Kalam down, but Ammajaan compels him to spare Kalam. Kalam kills Faruk for helping Badshah. Meanwhile, Rina tries to fly to the US with Mijan, but Badshah abducts her and brings her to his house for the wedding. When Badshah goes out for the wedding shopping, Rina explains her situation to Ammajaan. Ammajaan wasn't aware of the situation, yet she understands and assures Rine of her safety. Meanwhile, Kalam visits Badshah's house in search of Rina. He shoots Ammajaan, takes off with Rina. Rina sits for the wedding with Mijan immediately. Badshah comes home and hears Ammajaan's condition and hurries to the hospital. Realizing that his mother is critically sick and would be happy if he appears with his bride Rina, he runs to Rina's wedding. He faces vicious attacks by Kalam's gang, but manages to escape with Rina, and requests her for just a last show up in front of his mother. Rina agrees, and they go to the hospital.

Injured but alive, Kalam also chases them in hospital, and shoots Badshah from the back. Kalam is shot dead by Nabab, and Badshah, barely alive, appears in front of Ammajaan and requests her to talk and smile. Ammajaan does talk to him, for the first time in 22 years. She tells him to send Rina back to her lover Mijan. Mijan arrives with Aziz Ahmed, and Badshah hands Rina over to him. When the police arrive to arrest him, Badshah declares that no force in world can catch him but the Almighty. Saying this, Badshah dies in the hands of his Ammajaan.

== Cast ==
- Shabnam as Ammajan/Jahanara Begum
- Manna as Badshah (son of Ammajan)
- Moushumi as Rina
- Amin Khan as Mijan
- Monowar Hossain Dipjol as Kalam
- Mizu Ahmed as Aziz Ahmed Khan
- Siraj Haider as Lal Miah Badshah's father
- Kazi Hayat

== Music ==
The film's music and lyrics were by Ahmed Imtiaz Bulbul.

=== Soundtrack ===
Tracks	Titles	Singers
1	Ammajan	Ayub Bachchu
2	Swami ar Stri Banai Je Mistri	Ayub Bachchu
3	Tomar Amar Prem	Ayub Bachchu & Kanak Chapa
4	Rag Day	Agun & Shakila Zafar
5	O Chemri Tor Kopal Bhalo	Agun
