= Tamalika Karmakar =

Bangladeshi actress and model

- তমালিকা কর্মকার
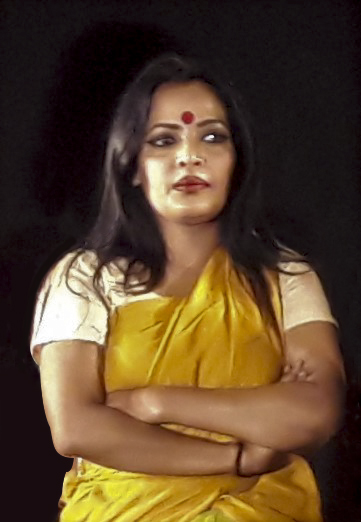
- Karmakar at Rajshahi College
- Born: 2 July 1970 (age 55)
- Occupations: Actor, model
- Years active: 1992–present
- Spouses: Pravin (m. 2024)
- Relatives: Chayanika Chowdhury (sister)
- Awards: Bangladesh National Film Award for Best Supporting Actress
- Website: www.tamalika.com

Signature
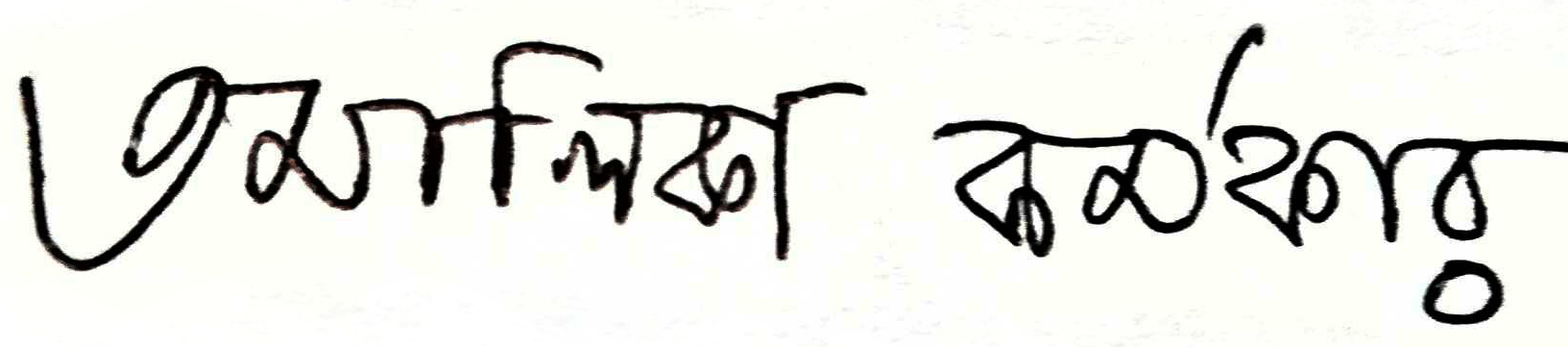

Tamalika Karmakar (born 2 July) is a Bangladeshi actress and model. Her most notable film roles were in Ei Ghor Ei Songsar (1996), Kittonkhola (2000) and Ghetuputra Komola (2012). Tamalika won the Bangladesh National Film Award for Best Supporting Actress for her role in Kittonkhola. In July 2017, she performed, with Aranyak Nattaydal theatre troupe, in Rarang, on their 180th rendition.

== Early life ==
Karmakar was born on 2 July. She started acting at the age of 3. Gowhor Jamil, folk and classical dancer, was her dance teacher.

== Career ==
Karmakar has been associated with the theater group Aranyak Nattaydal since January 1992. She debuted in the theater play Pathor, written and produced by Mamunur Rashid and Azizul Hakim. She went on to play other plays including Khela Khela, Iblish, Prakritojon and Joyjointhi.

== Personal life ==
Karmakar has been residing in New Jersey since 2020. She married Pravin on 20 January 2024.

== Works ==
=== Films ===
Year	Film	Role	Director	Notes
1995	Anya Jibon		Sheikh Niamat Ali	
1996	Ei Ghor Ei Songsar		Malek Afsari	
2000	Kittonkhola	Dalimon	Abu Sayeed	won Bangladesh National Film Award for Best Supporting Actress
2012	Ghetuputra Komola	Mother of Komala	Humayun Ahmed	

=== Television dramas ===
Year	Drama	Role	Producer	Notes
1993	Kothao Keu Nei	Shuma	Mohammad Barkatullah	

=== Stage plays ===
Years	Stage play	Note
1992	Pathor	55 Show, Playwright Mamunur Rashid, director Azizul Hakim
1997	Joy Joyonti	103 Show
1997	Moyour Singhason	115 Show
1998	Prakritojon Kotha	20 Show
2004	Rarang	174 Show
2010	Shotrugon	12 Show
2010	Uporuala	1 Show
2010	Sopnojatrik	1 Show, It was built on the Rana Plaza collapse
2010	Khela Khela	2 Show
2016	Vongbongo	24 Show
2017	Jubilee Hotele	18 Show
2017	Adom	Mamunur Rashid directed
2017	Manus	In Melbourne/Sidni, Mamunur Rashid directed
2017	Iblish	In London, Mamunur Rashid directed
	Mayer Mukh	10 Show, Pracco Nattodol
	Saylok	1 Show, Pracco Nattodol

== Awards ==
Bangladesh National Film Award for Best Supporting Actress

National Film Awards is the most prominent film award ceremony in Bangladesh. Established in 1975 by Government of Bangladesh. This is the only film awards given by the Government of Bangladesh. Tamalika Karmakar received this Award for Best Supporting Actress for movie Kittonkhola in 2000 directed by Abu Sayeed.

Mega Start Music and Entertainment award 2016

Tamalika Karmakar got Mega Start Music and Entertainment award in recognition of her outstanding and continuous achievement in acting and theater.

International Theatre Festival of Kerala (ITFOK) 2008

This was given to Tamalika Karmakar as a memorandum in International Theater Festival of Kerala 2008

Television Dorshok Forum of Bangladesh (TDFBD) (2005)

TTamalika Karmakar received this award as best actress in 2005.

Ekota Performance Award 2004

DPL Media City Showbiz Award (2010)

Tamalika won the Award for best actress in stage by DPL Media City Showbiz Award in 2010.

Ekota Samajik Sangskritik Sangstha Award (2002)

Tamalika Karmakar received Ekota Samajik Sangskritik Sangstha honor for her acting in Bangla telefilm Kurukkhetro.

BTV Child Artist Award (Nutun Kuri) 1982

In 1982 Tamalika Karmakar again received Bangladesh National Television Child Artist Award (Nutun Kuri) in the category of story telling.

International Pen-Palls Club Award (1989)

Tamalika Karmakar Received International Pen-Palls Club Award in 1989 for bring up the Heroic acts of the myrters in 1971 libaration war to the children.

Aronnok Natto Dol Award

She won the honorable medal from Aronnok Natto Dol in their 50th stage show.

Bornochora Natto Goshthi Award

Tamalika Karmakar got the Bornochora Natto Goshthi Award in their 32 years anniversary.

Shibli Award by Dhaka Theatre

Dhaka Theater had given Tamalika Karmakar Faojia Yasmin Shibli Podok in Shelim al Din Jonmoutshob 2008 for her performance in theater.

North American Bangladesh Cultural Society Award

Honorary Award from the North American Bangladesh Cultural Society.
