= Rasel (actor) =

Bangladeshi film actor

- রাসেল
- Occupation: Actor
- Years active: 1987–1997
- Awards: National Film Awards (1st time)

Rasel, popularly known as Master Rasel is a Bangladeshi film actor. He won the Bangladesh National Film Award for Best Child Artist for the film Rajlakshmi Srikanta (1987) which he shared with Suborna Shirin.

== Notable films ==
- Rajlakshmi Srikanta - 1987
- Kashem Malar Prem - 1991
- Tiger - 1997

== Awards ==
Year	Award	Category	Film	Result
1987	National Film Awards	Best Child Artist	Rajlakshmi Srikanta	Won
