= Prometheus (Bangladeshi band) =

Bangladeshi rock band

Prometheus প্রমিথিউস
- Origin: Dhaka City, Bangladesh
- Genres: Pop rock; Soft rock; Hard rock
- Years active: 1986-2016
- Labels: Sargam; Soundtek; Sangeeta; G-Series
- Members: Biplob; Quyel; Rezwan; Arif; Bulbul; Shareq

Prometheus is a popular Bangladeshi band formed in 17 July 1986. The band was named after the Greek mythological figure Prometheus. It became one of the popular bands of the 1980s and released several well-known songs.

The band has released a total of 18 albums. Most of their albums include songs about contemporary social issues and patriotism. One of the notable features of the band was the colorful stage appearance and unique musical style of its lead vocalist, Biplob.

== Discography ==
Studio albums

- Swadhinota Chai
- Muktir Prottashay
- Projonmer Songram
- Slogan
- Joddha
- Prometheus 2000
- Smritir Kopat
- O-Aa
- Pathshala
- Dhol
- Taka
- Nagordola
- Rajpath
- Prometheus Unbound
- Prometheus Unbound One
- Chhayapath
- Amader Poth
- Tala Chabi
