= Dilip Biswas =

Bangladeshi film director

- দিলীপ বিশ্বাস
- Born: 1946; India
- Died: 12 July 2006 (aged 59–60); Bangkok, Thailand
- Resting place: Dhaka
- Occupations: Film director; film producer; musical artist
- Years active: 1966–2006
- Children: Debashish Biswas
- Awards: National Film Award

Dilip Biswas (1946 – 12 July 2006) was a Bangladeshi film director. Beside film direction, he was also actor and musician.

== Career ==
=== As director ===
- Agun Niye Khela (Assistant Director)
- Samadhi (first movie directed)
- Dabi
- Bandhu
- Asami
- Anurodh
- Jinjir
- Anarkali
- Anshidar
- Apoman
- Ashikar
- Opekhha
- Akritoggo
- Ajante
- Mayer Morjada

=== As actor ===
- Habur Biyer

=== As producer ===
- Akritoggo
- Shoshurbari Zindabad
- Mayer Morjada

=== As singer ===
- Behulaa
- Anwara
- Momer Alo
- Dui Bhai
- Alomoti
- Santan
- Chena Ochena

== Honors ==
=== National Film Awards ===
- Winner Best Director -
