= Ei Ghor Ei Songsar =

Bangladeshi drama film

- Poster
- Directed by: Malek Afsary
- Story by: Malek Afsary
- Produced by: Malek Afsary
- Starring: Salman Shah; Brishti; Rosy Afsary; Bulbul Ahmed; Ali Raj; Tamalika Karmakar
- Cinematography: M A Bukhari
- Edited by: Jinnat Hossain
- Music by: Alam Khan
- Release date: 5 April 1996
- Running time: 155 minutes
- Country: Bangladesh
- Language: Bengali

Ei Ghor Ei Songsar is a 1996 Bangladeshi drama film which was directed by Malek Afsary, starring Salman Shah, Brishti, Bulbul Ahmed, Rosy Afsary, Ali Raj and Tamalika Karmakar in lead roles. This film was released on 5 April 1996. This film performed very poorly at the box office.

== Cast ==
- Salman Shah as Ahmed Humayun Mintu
- Brishti as Julie Chowdhury
- Rosy Afsari as Mamota
- Bulbul Ahmed as Shahidullah Khan (Mamota's husband)
- Ali Raj as Chintu
- Tamalika Karmakar as Saika (Chintu's wife)
- Khalil Ullah Khan as Zahiruddin Chowdhury (Julie’s father)
- Nasir Khan as Akkel Ali
- Dildar as Dildar
- Tandra Islam as Farida Begum (Saika's mother)
- A.K. Qureshi as College Principal
- Zamilur Rahman Shakha as Mr. Chowdhury (Noorie's father)
- Sushoma as Jolhostini
- Syed Akhtar Ali as Chintu's colleague

== Soundtrack ==
The film's music has been composed by Alam Khan with lyrics by Mohammad Rafiquzzaman and Milton Khondokar.

No.	Title	Lyrics	singer(s)	Length
1.	"Sukh Sukh Sukhiya"		Agun and Rizia Parvin
2.	"Apa Tui Raag Koris Na"		Moloy Chaki
3.	"Narir Karone"		Subir Nandi
4.	"Tetullata Tetulpata"		Agun and Rizia Parvin
5.	"Amader Chhoto Nodi"		Andrew Kishore, Sabina Yasmin, Agun
6.	"Pagol Kora Adore"	Mohammad Rafiquzzaman	Runa Laila
