= Loot Toraj =

Loot-Toraj
- Film poster of Loot-Toraj
- Directed by: Kazi Hayat
- Written by: Kazi Hayat
- Produced by: Kritanjoli Films
- Starring: Manna; Diti; Moushumi; Anwara; Rajib
- Cinematography: Moniruzzaman Monir
- Edited by: Amzat Hossain
- Music by: Ahmed Imtiaz Bulbul
- Production company: Kritanjoli Films
- Distributed by: Kritanjoli Films
- Release date: 1997
- Country: Bangladesh
- Language: Bengali
- Budget: ৳1.15 crore
- Box office: ৳7.10 crore

Loot-Toraj (transl. The Plunder) is a 1997 Bangladeshi political action-drama film. It was produced by actor Manna under the banner of Kritanjoli Films, making it his first film as a producer. It was directed by Kazi Hayat. The film stars Manna, Diti, Moushumi, and Rajib in the lead roles.

The film was released in Bangladesh in 1997 and became a commercial success at the box office.

== Cast ==
- Manna
- Diti
- Moushumi
- Anwara
- Rajib
- Mizu Ahmed
- Anwar Hossain
- Sharmin
- Dildar
- Dulari
- Danny Raj
- Arman
- Nantu
- Kala Aziz
- Jackie
- Siraj Haider
- Maruf (child artist)

== Music ==
The film’s songs were written, composed, and arranged by Ahmed Imtiaz Bulbul. Playback singers included Runa Laila, Kanak Chapa, Agun, Khalid Hasan Milu, Doly Sayontoni, and Ayub Bachchu.

Loot-Toraj marked the first time legendary rock artist Ayub Bachchu performed playback singing in a film, at the request of Manna. The song "Ananta Prem Tumi Dao Amake", sung by Ayub Bachchu and Kanak Chapa, became very popular.

== Notes ==
- Loot-Toraj was actor Manna’s first film as a producer.
- It was the first collaboration between Manna and Moushumi.
