= Rajlakshmi Srikanta =

Bangladeshi Bengali-language film

- Poster
- Directed by: Bulbul Ahmed
- Screenplay by: Bulbul Ahmed
- Produced by: Bulbul Ahmed
- Starring: Shabana; Bulbul Ahmed; Razzak; Rasel; Prabir Mitra; Nuton
- Music by: Alauddin Ali
- Distributed by: Troyee Chitram
- Release date: 11 February 1983
- Running time: 128 minutes
- Country: Bangladesh
- Language: Bengali

Rajlakshmi Srikanta (Bengali: রাজলক্ষ্মী শ্রীকান্ত) is a Bangladeshi Bengali-language film released in 1987. The film is directed by Bulbul Ahmed and based on a novel by Saratchandra Chattopadhyay. The screenplay and dialogues of the film were written by Bulbul Ahmed, Mumtazuddin Ahmed and Zahirul Haque. Shabana and Bulbul Ahmed acted in the title roles of the film. Prabir Mitra, Nuton, Razzak and many others acted in other roles. The film won the National Film Award and Bacchus Award in multiple categories including Best Film in 1987.

== Cast ==
- Shabana
- Bulbul Ahmed
- Razzak
- Rasel
- Prabir Mitra
- Nutan

== Soundtrack ==
No	Song title	Singer(s)	Duration
1	"Jamuna Boro Beimaan"	Sabina Yasmin	4:09
2	"Shoto Jonomer Shopno"	Sabina Yasmin	5:17
3	"Mora Ghoonghat Na Kholo Saawariya"	Sabina Yasmin	3:10
4	"Ami Jolshaghare Nupur Pora Bondini"	Sabina Yasmin	4:17
5	"Laglam Na To Karo Pujatey"	Subir Nandi and Abida Sultana	4:40
6	N/A	Runa Laila	

== Awards ==
12th Bangladesh National Film Awards

- Best Film - Bulbul Ahmed
- Best Supporting Actor - Abul Khair
- Best Female Playback Singer - Sabina Yasmin
- Best Child Artist - Master Rasel and Suborna Shirin

Bachsas Awards

- Best Film - Bulbul Ahmed
- Best Director - Bulbul Ahmed
- Best Actor - Bulbul Ahmed
- Best Actress - Shabana
- Best Supporting Actor - Prabir Mitra
- Best Supporting Actress - Nutan
- Best Screenplay - Bulbul Ahmed
- Best Female Playback Singer - Sabina Yasmin
- Best Lyricist - Gazi Mazharul Anwar
- Best Cinematographer - M. A. Mobin
- Best Editing - Atikur Rahman Mollik
