= Ammajan (song) =

Song by Ayub Bachchu

from the album Ammajan
- Language: Bengali
- Released: 1999
- Recorded: 1999
- Studio: Shruti Studio
- Genre: Film score
- Length: 5:54
- Label: Anupam Recording Media (2018–present)
- Songwriter: Ahmed Imtiaz Bulbul

Music video
- "Ammajan" on YouTube

"Ammajan" is a Bengali film music released in 1999. This song was used in the 1999 film Ammajan, directed by Kazi Hayat. Ayub Bachchu was the singer, while Ahmed Imtiaz Bulbul composed the song. The song was picturized on Shabnam and Manna, with Manna lip-syncing to the song. Through this song, Bachchu became popular in Bengali films.

== Background ==
=== Concept ===
The song is part of a film named Ammajan directed by Kazi Hayat. The director asked Bulbul to write and compose a song about mothers for the film that no other mother-related song could compare to. Hayat told Bulbul the plot of the film in detail where the mother devotee hero would do anything for her. Taking everything into consideration, Bulbul wrote and composed the song.

=== Inspiration ===
In the lyrics of the song, he adds several religious words. He made the song so that everyone can understand and sing it. The melody of the song was inspired from a Pashtun folk song.

=== Artist ===
Bulbul wanted to sing the song to Bachchu, whom he had known since childhood.Bachchu initially refused to sing the song and had to be persuaded. While recording the song, Bachchu did not have to use any instruments or software to sing.

== Production ==
Ahmed Imtiaz Bulbul composed and wrote the lyrics of this song, and the singer was Ayub Bachchu. Bachchu's singing garnered a positive reception.

== Release and in popular culture ==
After the release of the film, the song was well received by the audience, and the song became a household name. The song is regularly aired on Bangladesh Betar's film music program. 19 years after the release of the film, the music video of the song was released on YouTube on June 25, 2018, under Anupam Recording Media.

== Awards ==
Year	Award	Nomination	Category	Result	Ref
1999	Bachsas Awards	Ayub Bachchu	Best Male Playback Singer	Won	
