= Ulta Palta 69 =

2007 Bangladeshi action thriller film

- Movie poster
- Directed by: Malek Afsary
- Screenplay by: S. S. Rajamouli (Main Storyline); Malek Afsary (Bengali Dubbed)
- Story by: V. Vijayendra Prasad
- Produced by: Malek Afsary
- Starring: Manna; Purnima; Erin Zaman; Nasir Khan
- Music by: Ali Akram Shuvo; Kabir Bakul (lyrics)
- Release date: 2007
- Country: Bangladesh
- Language: Bengali

Ulta Palta 69 is a 2007 Bangladeshi action thriller film directed and produced by Malek Afsary. It stars Manna, Purnima, Nasir Khan and Asif Iqbal in the lead roles. It is a remake of the Telugu film Vikramarkudu.

== Plot ==
Durjoy (Manna) is a small-time thief and crook who is crazy about acts of daredevilry who falls in love with Poorna (Purnima) who is in Dhaka to attend a marriage. Dujoya makes his way into her heart and she also starts loving him. Dujoya tells her the truth about him being a thief and resolves to give up crime forever. But before that, he decides to swindle one last person for a large sum of money along with his con-friend Duvva. He tricks a woman on a railway station and flees with a trunk. This leads Dujoya to Neha (Baby Tina), a young girl who was in the trunk instead of the wealth he thought was in the trunk, who thinks that Dujoya is her father. Flummoxed by what is happening, but forced to keep Neha with her as a police officer Inspector keeps his eye on him.

Although he tries keeping neha away from Poorna's eyes, the latter finds out about Neha. Angry and hurt, Poorna leaves for her place leaving Dujoya heartbroken. Soon, unknown goons attack him, taking him to be a latter named ASP Lohmal Bijoy (also Manna), Neha's real father. Bijoy looks exactly like Dujoya which had caused all the confusion. While many unknown persons help Dujoya run to safety with Neha in his arms, he is soon surrounded by the goons. It is then that Bijoy makes an appearance and saves the day killing every goon by himself using a sharp gear. But Bijoy soon dies suffering from injuries.

The other policemen who had assisted the ASP then inform Dujoya of the whole incident. In a village near Dhaka, Debgarh, an MLA, Bapji used to trouble and torture people and also annex money from them. His son Munna used to rape the wives of policemen. Bijoy immediately arrested him and also made him mentally insane. Munna humiliates police by removing their clothes but was killed by Bijoy when he was hung from a tree by the belt of a humiliated inspector. Bijoy was attacked by Bapji's brother Titla on Dusshehra where he was stabbed from the back as well as shot in the head while trying to save a village child and was assumed to be dead. But he survived with a brain injury although the goons assumed that he is dead. Effects of this brain injury are later visible and these effects are diminished by water falling on his head.

Dujoya then adopts Neha, who does not know that her father is dead. Then Dujoya returns to Debgarh posing as ASP Lohmal Bijoy and heads to settle the scores with Bapji. Duvva tells Poorna the truth and she forgives Dujoya. Dujoya, being a goon handles Bapji well with tricks. He sets Bapji's wine factory on fire and makes the villagers rob his food store. A fight ensues in which he defeats all of Bapji's men alone. In the end, he fights with Titla on a rope bridge. Dujoya ties the rope and cuts the rope and Titla fall to death. Dujoya marries Poorna and they leave for a new life with Neha and Duvva.

== Cast ==
- Manna as Durjoy/ ASP Rohmon Bijoy
- Purnima as Poorna
- Erin Zaman
- Asif Iqbal
- Nasir Khan
- Lenin
- Sanko Panja
- Kazi Hayat
- Danny Raj
- Afzal Sharif
- Bobby/Badal
- Nasrin
- Baby Tina (child artiste)

== Track list ==
Track list
No.	Title	Singer(s)	Length
1.	"Dhin Tak Dhina Dhina (title song)"	Andro Kishor	4:21
2.	"Tumi Ki Jadu Jano"	Baby Najnin and Andro Kishor	4:08
3.	"O Full Dekhle Icca Kore"	Polash and Doly Santony	3:58
4.	"Ami Chondo Na Re Chondo na"		4:08
5.	"Dom Maro Dom"	Onima, NoKul Kumar and Doly Santony	3:41
Total length:			21:35
