= Shakila Zafar =

Bangladeshi singer

- Born: Shakila; 28 February 1962 (age 63); Karachi, West Pakistan, Pakistan
- Genres: Pop, Nazrul Geeti
- Occupations: Singer, television presenter
- Years active: 1983–present
- Spouse(s): Manna Zafar (divorced) Ravi Sharma (m. 2015)

Shakila Sharma (born 28 February 1962), better known as Shakila Zafar, is a Bangladeshi singer. Zafar's career began as a result of her appearance in the 1983 BTV program Jodi Kichu Mone Na Koren, where she performed an astrology-themed song, "Tula Rashir Meye".

== Early life ==
Zafar was born in Karachi, Pakistan. She grew up in Pakistan with her family. Her family belongs to Sirajganj District, Bangladesh. Her father was a government employee of Pakistan. He was assigned to the Industrial Development Bank of Pakistan. In 1970, Shakila came to Bangladesh and was admitted to the Willes Little Flower School. She followed this with graduation from Dhaka University in philosophy.

== Career ==
Zafar's fifteenth album, Labonye Purno Pran, was her first solo album of Rabindra Sangeet. It contains ten songs selected and arranged by Tagore song exponent Chanchal Khan. It was recorded in Kolkata and released on the G-Series label in April 2011.

== Personal life ==
Shakila first married Manna Zafar. She took the surname "Zafar" after marriage. Together they have a son, Mufrad Zafar. Mufrad became engaged to singer Sanzida Mahmood Nandita in 2024. The couple later got divorced.

In December 2015, Shakila married Ravi Sharma, an Indian poet and engineer who is a former CEO of Adani Power and was also CEO-South Asia at Alcatel-Lucent. She then took the surname Sharma.

== Bengali songs ==
=== Film songs ===
| Year | Film | Song | Composer(s) | Songwriter(s) | Co-artist(s) |
|---|---|---|---|---|---|
| 1984 | N/A | "Ami Nesha Bine Matal Holam" | Azmal Huda Mithu | | Sujit Mostafa |
| 1986 | Dhaka 86 | "Pathorer Prithibite Kacher Hridoy" | Anwar Parvez | Gazi Mazharul Anwar | Tapan Chowdhury |
| 1989 | Sakkhi Proman | "Tomar Omor Naam" (version 1) | Ahmed Imtiaz Bulbul | Ahmed Imtiaz Bulbul | Khalid Hasan Milu |
| 1989 | Sakkhi Proman | "Tomar Omor Naam" (version 2) | Ahmed Imtiaz Bulbul | Ahmed Imtiaz Bulbul | Khalid Hasan Milu |
| 1991 | Lawarish | "Wada Tomar Amar" | Ahmed Imtiaz Bulbul | Ahmed Imtiaz Bulbul | Andrew Kishore |
| 1992 | Danga | "Tumi Amar" | Ahmed Imtiaz Bulbul | Ahmed Imtiaz Bulbul | Andrew Kishore |
| 1992 | Danga | "Tumi Phuler Gondho Nao" | Mrinal Banerjee | N/A | Andrew Kishore |
| 1992 | Jeler Meye Roshni | "Hay Hay Ammar Norom Dile" | Alauddin Ali | Moniruzzaman Monir | solo |
| 1993 | Akheri Hamla | "Bondhu Ki Shunaila" | Ahmed Imtiaz Bulbul | Ahmed Imtiaz Bulbul | Shuvro Dev |
| 1993 | Akheri Hamla | "O Mishti Meye" | Ahmed Imtiaz Bulbul | Ahmed Imtiaz Bulbul | Shuvro Dev |
| 1993 | Meyer Adhikar | "N/A" | Abu Taher | Mohammad Rafiquzzaman | Shuvro Dev |
| 1993 | Moushumi | "Bondhu Hoye Kache Ele" | Anwar Parvez | Gazi Mazharul Anwar | Jhumu Khan |
| 1994 | Banglar Maa | "Khokamoni Shono" | Alauddin Ali | | Rafiqul Alam |
| 1994 | Chand Kumari Chashar Chhele | "Sara Ange Jouboner Dheu" (part 1) | Ahmed Imtiaz Bulbul | Ahmed Imtiaz Bulbul | Abida Sultana |
| 1994 | Chand Kumari Chashar Chhele | "Sara Ange Jouboner Dheu" (part 2) | Ahmed Imtiaz Bulbul | Ahmed Imtiaz Bulbul | Abida Sultana |
| 1994 | Dakat | "Sahos Rakho Buke" | Anwar Jahan Nantu | Delwar Jahan Jhontu | Andrew Kishore, chorus |
| 1994 | Judge Barrister | "Shono Shono Abbu Amar" | Anwar Jahan Nantu | Delwar Jahan Jhontu | solo |
| 1994 | Judge Barrister | "Shono Shono Abbu Amar" (reprise) | Anwar Jahan Nantu | Delwar Jahan Jhontu | solo |
| 1994 | Judge Barrister | "Moner Majhe Mon Pelo" | Anwar Jahan Nantu | Delwar Jahan Jhontu | Shahriar Sagor |
| 1994 | Raag Anurag | "Amar Laor Jibone Sukher Prodip" | Anwar Jahan Nantu | Delwar Jahan Jhontu | Andrew Kishore |
| 1995 | Adorer Sontan | "Ailo Gange Noya Pani" | Alauddin Ali | Amjad Hossain | solo |
| 1995 | Agnee Sontan | "Ei Prem Chirodin Thakbe" | Abu Taher | | Andrew Kishore |
| 1995 | Hulia | "O Lombu Chhoy Foot" | Ahmed Imtiaz Bulbul | Ahmed Imtiaz Bulbul | Shakila Zafar |
| 1995 | Hulia | "Hajar Bochhor Por" | Ahmed Imtiaz Bulbul | Ahmed Imtiaz Bulbul | Agun |
| 1995 | Moha Milon | "Prithibike Sakkhi Rekhe" | Ahmed Imtiaz Bulbul | | Syed Abdul Hadi |
| 1996 | Bashira | "Bhulnona Bhulbona Bondhu" | Ahmed Imtiaz Bulbul | Ahmed Imtiaz Bulbul | Agun |
| 1996 | Chaowa Theke Paowa | "Sukh Sukh Laage Amar" | Ahmed Imtiaz Bulbul | Ahmed Imtiaz Bulbul | Shakila Zafar |
| 1996 | Chaowa Theke Paowa | "Furti Koro Go" | Ahmed Imtiaz Bulbul | Ahmed Imtiaz Bulbul | solo |
| 1996 | Mayer Adhikar | "Palkite Choraiya" | Ahmed Imtiaz Bulbul, Moniruzzaman Monir | Ahmed Imtiaz Bulbul | Subir Nandi |
| 1996 | Tomake Chai | "Congratulation And Celebration" | Ahmed Imtiaz Bulbul | | solo |
| 1997 | Banglar Bodhu | "Jolbe Jolte Nibhe Jabe" | | | solo |
| 1997 | Beimani | "Ogo Dushtu Chhele" | Alauddin Ali | | Agun |
| 1997 | Beimani | "Besh Korechhi Prem Korechhi" | Alauddin Ali | | Agun |
| 1997 | Fasi | "Priyotoma, O Rupoma" | Alauddin Ali | Mohammad Rafiquzzaman, Moniruzzaman Monir | Andrew Kishore |
| 1997 | Khudhar Jaala | "Mishti Hese Tumi Dekha Dile" | N/A | Enayet Karim | solo |
| 1997 | Khudhar Jaala | "Tomra Ektara Bajaiyo Na" | N/A | Enayet Karim | Agun |
| 1997 | Palabi Kothay | "Bashor Raate Biral Mara Chai" | Alam Khan | Milton Khondokar | solo |
| 1998 | Anek Diner Asha | "Ore Maa Re, Khokhono Tui Jas Na Re" | Ahmed Imtiaz Bulbul | Ahmed Imtiaz Bulbul | Andrew Kishore, Kanak Chapa, Subir Nandi, Khalid Hasan Milu, Shuvro Dev |
| 1998 | Anek Diner Asha | "Baper Moto Baap Hole, Emon Chhele Hoy" | Ahmed Imtiaz Bulbul | Ahmed Imtiaz Bulbul | Subir Nandi |
| 1998 | Anek Diner Asha | "Tumi Sundor Ekta Manush" | Ahmed Imtiaz Bulbul | Ahmed Imtiaz Bulbul | Andrew Kishore |
| 1998 | Anek Diner Asha | "Amar Naker Phool Koi?" | Ahmed Imtiaz Bulbul | Ahmed Imtiaz Bulbul | Shuvro Dev |
| 1998 | Ghater Majhi | "Tumi Amar Ghater Majhi" | Tansen Khan | Moniruzzaman Monir | M A Khalek |
| 1998 | Matribhumi | "Amar Prithibi Tumi" | Ahmed Imtiaz Bulbul | Nadeem Mahmud, Md. Rafiq and Kabir Bakul | Khalid Hasan Milu |
| 1998 | Mayer Kosom | "Ami Je Tomay Koto" | Ahmed Imtiaz Bulbul | Ahmed Imtiaz Bulbul | Agun |
| 1998 | Mrityur Mukhe | "Ami Roshe Bhora Chomchom" | Abu Taher | Moniruzzaman Monir | solo |
| 1998 | Mrityur Mukhe | "Ami Roshe Bhora Chomchom" (short) | Abu Taher | Moniruzzaman Monir | solo |
| 1998 | Mukti Chai | "Ajke Sobai Bolo Chiching Fak" | Ahmed Imtiaz Bulbul | | Agun |
| 1998 | Nishpap Bodhu | "Ami Chupi Chupi Tomar Mon Kere" | Anwar Jahan Nantu | Abdul Hai Al Hadi, Moniruzzaman Monir, Delwar Jahan Jhontu | Khalid Hasan Milu |
| 1998 | Nishpap Bodhu | "Lekhapora Kore Je" | Anwar Jahan Nantu | Abdul Hai Al Hadi, Moniruzzaman Monir, Delwar Jahan Jhontu | solo |
| 1998 | Ranga Bou | "Sundori Go Tor Jeno" | Ahmed Imtiaz Bulbul | | Agun |
| 1998 | Ruti | "Tumi Ki Bujhona Boyoser Jwala" | Shawkat Ali Emon | Enayet Karim | solo |
| 1998 | Ruti | "Batti Nibhlo Andhar Hoilo" | Shawkat Ali Emon | Enayet Karim | Agun |
| Sukher Ashay | "Chokh Sundor Mukh Sundor" | Ahmed Imtiaz Bulbul | Ahmed Imtiaz Bulbul | Andrew Kishore | |
| 1999 | Jobordokhol | "Swadhinata Amar Swadhinata" | Ahmed Imtiaz Bulbul | | Agun, Khalid Hasan Milu |
| 1999 | Laal Badshah | "Ami Tomar Kachhei Phire Asbo" | Abu Taher | Moniruzzaman Monir | Andrew Kishore |
| 1999 | Love In Bangkok | "Bangkok Shohor Aisha" | Ahmed Imtiaz Bulbul | | Agun |
| 2000 | Bishe Bhora Nagin | "Prem Daona Amay" | Anwar Jahan Nantu | | Monir Khan |
| 2000 | Lady Rongbaz | "Ogo Priyo Tumi" | Ahmed Imtiaz Bulbul | | Khalid Hasan Milu |
| 2001 | Kothin Shasti | "Na Na Chhuiyona" | Ali Akram Shuvo | Kabir Bakul | Agun |
| 2001 | Tandob Lila | "Ei Piriti Sei Piriti" | Ahmed Imtiaz Bulbul | Ahmed Imtiaz Bulbul | Monir Khan |
| 2002 | Bhalobashar Shotru | "Tumi Amar Emon Aponjon" | Ahmed Imtiaz Bulbul | Ahmed Imtiaz Bulbul | solo |
| 2002 | Bhalobashar Shotru | "Onek Joton Kore Ami" | Ahmed Imtiaz Bulbul | Ahmed Imtiaz Bulbul | solo |
| 2004 | Bachao | "Antore Bahire Agun Legechhe" | Emon Saha | | Rupom |
| 2005 | Gaddari | "Ei Prithibir Sobai Jaane" | Ali Akram Shuvo | Kabir Bakul | Asif |
| 2006 | Na Bolona | "Ki Kotha Je Likhi" | Ahmed Imtiaz Bulbul | Ahmed Imtiaz Bulbul | Andrew Kishore |
| 2006 | Na Bolona | "Picnic-eri Dhom" | Ahmed Imtiaz Bulbul | Ahmed Imtiaz Bulbul | Samina Chowdhury |
| 2006 | Na Bolona | "Jokhoni Keu Bhalobashe" | Ahmed Imtiaz Bulbul | Ahmed Imtiaz Bulbul | solo |
| 2006 | Na Bolona | "Chokh Sorano Joto Sohoj" | Ahmed Imtiaz Bulbul | Ahmed Imtiaz Bulbul | Andrew Kishore, Samina Chowdhury |
| 2006 | Sathi Tumi Kar? | "Prem Korechhi, Kono Paap Korini" | Ahmed Imtiaz Bulbul | | solo |
| 2006 | Tokair Hate Ostro Keno | "Amar Ontoreri Manush Tumi" | Ahmed Imtiaz Bulbul | | Monir Khan |
| 2007 | Mayer Bodla | "Tomay Dekhte Dekhte" | | | solo |
| 2010 | Abujh Bou | "Dosyi Dosyi Ami" | Sujeo Shyam | Mohammad Rafiquzzaman | solo |
| 2010 | Mayer Chokh | "Tomar Sathe Hobe Kotha Re" | Alam Khan | Kabir Bakul | S I Tutul |
| 2013 | Devdas | "Amar Hariye Jawar Shesh Thikana, Tomar Duti Chokh" | Emon Saha | Gazi Mazharul Anwar, Mohammad Rafiquzzaman | Bappa Mazumdar |
| N/A | Sobuj Coat Kalo Choshma | "Prithibir Shuru Theke Prem Chhilo" | | | |
| N/A | Sobuj Coat Kalo Choshma | "O Priyo Tumi Kachhe Ese Bolo" | | | |
| N/A | N/A | "Ghorir Kata Theme Thak" | | | Ayub Bachchu |

=== Television songs ===
| Year | Show | Song | Composer(s) | Songwriter(s) | Co-singer(s) |
|---|---|---|---|---|---|
| 1998 | Meril Prothom Alo Awards | "Medley Song" | various | various | Samina Chowdhury and Kanak Chapa |

=== Non-film songs ===
| Year | Film | Song | Composer(s) | Songwriter(s) | Co-artist(s) |
|---|---|---|---|---|---|
| N/A | Single | "Ogo Megh Tumi Jhor Ene Dao" | | | solo |
| N/A | Single | "Sobai Bole Smriti Boro Jwala" | Ajit Roy | Mohammad Mozakker | solo |
