= Mayer Morjada =

Bangladeshi film

- VCD Cover
- Directed by: Dilip Biswas
- Written by: Dilip Biswas
- Produced by: Gayatri Biswas
- Starring: Manna; Shakib Khan; Moushumi; Shabnur; Bobita; Sohel Rana; Humayun Faridi
- Cinematography: Abul Kaibe
- Edited by: Minto
- Music by: Emon Saha
- Distributed by: G Series; Geeti Chitrakotha
- Release date: 2006
- Country: Bangladesh
- Language: Bengali

Mayer Morjada is a Bangladeshi Bengali-language film. The film was released in 2006 all over Bangladesh. It was directed and written by Dilip Biswas. It is a family-based romantic comedy film. The film stars Manna, Shakib Khan Mousumi, Shabnur, Bobita, Sohel Rana, Humayun Faridi and Dolly Johur. This was the last film of director Dilip Biswas. Manna, Shakib Khan, Moushumi, and Shabnur are seen together on screen for the first and last time in this film.

== Cast ==
- Manna as Rajib
- Shakib Khan as Badhon
- Moushumi as Rini
- Shabnur as Megha
- Bobita
- Sohel Rana as Advocate Zahid Hossain, Badhon's father
- Humayun Faridi
- Dolly Johur
- Pirzada Shahidul Harun
- Prabir Mitra
- Sushoma Alam
- Dr. Ezazul Islam
- A K M Hasan
- Saju Khadem
- Ratan

== Crew ==
- Director: Dilip Biswas
- Producer: Gaiatri Biswas and Debashish Biswas
- Story: Dilip Biswas
- Script: Dilip Biswas
- Music: Imon Saha
- Lyrics: Kabir Bokul
- Cinematography: Abul Kaibe
- Editing: Minto
- Distributor: Geeti Chitrakotha

== Technical details ==
- Format: 35 MM (Color)
- Real: 13 Pans
- Original Language: Bengali
- Country of Origin: Bangladesh•Date of Theatrical Release: 2006
- Technical Support: Bangladesh Film Development Corporation (BFDC)

== Soundtrack ==
Mayer Morjada

Soundtrack album by Emon Saha
- Released: 2006
- Genre: Feature film soundtrack
- Producer: G Series

The film's music was directed by Bangladeshi famous music director Imon Saha. The lyrics were written by Gazi Mazharhul Anwar.

=== Soundtrack ===
No.	Title	singer(s)	Length
1.	"Oneke Bachte Chay"	Udit Narayan and Sadhana Sargam
2.	"Aamay Bhondo Bhebe"	Kumar Sanu
3.	"Asle Vobe Jete Hobe"	Kumar Sanu
4.	"Mone Mone Etodin"	Shaan and Shreya Ghoshal
5.	"Tomar Laiga Morte Pari"	Kavita Krishnamurthy
