= Kashem Malar Prem =

Bangladeshi film

- Poster
- Directed by: Mustafa Anwar
- Starring: Manna; Champa; Anwar Hossain; Dildar
- Edited by: Amzad Hossain
- Music by: Ahmed Imtiaz Bulbul
- Production company: Z. A. Films
- Release date: 10 May 1991
- Country: Bangladesh
- Language: Bengali

Kasem Malar Prem is a 1991 Bangladeshi film directed by Mustafa Anwar. Manna and Champa played the lead roles. It is Manna's debut film as a lead role. The film was a commercial success. This film established Manna as a lead role actor. It was also the first film of Manna and Champa, and the pair went on to make many other commercially successful films.

== Cast ==
- Manna as Kashem
- Champa as Mala
- Anwar Hossain
- Dildar
- Nasir Khan
- Khaleda Aktar Kolpona
- Rasel

== Censor ==
During the shooting of this film at FDC, stuntman Arman's entire body caught fire while giving the hero's (Manna) dummy. The thugs set the heroine's house on fire. In the scene where the hero jumps into the fire and rescues the heroine from the house, a shooting bomb exploded from below and stuntman Arman's entire body caught fire. Following the film's popularity, folkloric artists of the same name have been performing on stage at Grameen Jatrapala.
