= Kittonkhola =

2000 Bangladeshi film

- Movie poster
- Bengali: কিত্তনখোলা
- Directed by: Abu Sayeed
- Written by: Abu Sayeed; Nurul Alam Atique
- Based on: Kittonkhola by Selim Al Deen
- Produced by: Aangik Communications; Impress Telefilm Limited
- Starring: Raisul Islam Asad; Mamunur Rashid; Pijus Bandapadhyay; Jayanta Chattopadhyay; Naila Azad Nupur; Tamalika Karmakar; Azad Abul Kalam
- Cinematography: Samiran Datta
- Edited by: Sujan Mahmud
- Music by: Abu Sayeed
- Release date: 2000
- Running time: 96 minutes
- Country: Bangladesh
- Language: Bengali

Kittonkhola is a 2000 Bangladeshi film directed by Abu Sayeed. The story is based on the stage play of the same name by Selim Al Deen. It stars Raisul Islam Asad, Mamunur Rashid, Pijus Bandapadhyay, Jayanta Chattopadhyay, Naila Azad Nupur, Tamalika Karmakar, Azad Abul Kalam, Kamal Ahmed and Habibur Rahman Habib.

== Plot ==
Amid the festivities, there are people experiencing misfortune. Shonai, Boshir, Dalimon, Rustom, Bonosribala and Chayanajan are among them, and Kitonkhola is their story. The contrast between rural culture and festivities and the harsh reality of their daily struggle is striking. This harsh reality forces Bonosribala to take her own life. Shonai, Boshir, Chayanjan and Rustom are perplexed by their profession. Darkness looms around them.

== Cast ==
- Raisul Islam Asad as Sonai
- Mamunur Rashid
- Pijus Bandapadhyay as Idu Contractor
- Jayanta Chattopadhyay
- Naila Azad Nupur as Banasribala
- Tamalika Karmakar as Dalimon
- Azad Abul Kalam as Chhayaranjan

== Response ==
In the summer 2001 issue of Cinemaya, film critic Ahmed Muztaba Zamal wrote "The most outstanding performance in the film is that of Tamalika Karmakar". He also commended the presentation of characters Sonai and Chhayaranjan, but commented that director Abu Sayeed "has been less successful in presenting the other two important characters", Banasribala and Idu Contractor, and said the film "disappoints in places, with its technical imperfections."

== Awards ==
- National Film Awards in nine categories for 2000, including best film, best director, best script, best story, and best dialog.
