= Full and Final =

Bangladeshi romantic action thriller film

- announcement poster
- Directed by: Malek Afsary
- Written by: Kwak Jae-yong; Gordon Chan; Felix Chong
- Based on: Daisy
- Produced by: Taposhi Thakur
- Starring: Shakib Khan; Bobby
- Music by: Ali Akram Shuvo; Ahmed Humayun
- Distributed by: Heartbeat Production
- Release date: 16 October 2013
- Running time: 150 minutes
- Country: Bangladesh
- Language: Bengali

Full and Final is a 2013 Bangladeshi romantic action thriller film directed by Malek Afsary. The film stars Shakib Khan and Bobby in the lead roles. Full and Final is about a rough and tough police officer and was released on 16 October 2013 of Eid-ul Adha. Upon its release, the film received mixed reviews and was a Super-hit.

== Plot ==
Rimjim is a painter, who looks after her grandfather's shop during the week and earns extra money as a street painter on weekends. It's through her painting that she meets Abith (Tanvir Khan), a cop who is chasing a criminal, but keeps Rimjim in the dark about his real work. The other man, Romeo (Shakib Khan), is an undercover police officer who found a soft spot for her and watches her from afar for some time. However, being shy and ever mindful of the dangers of his professional career Romeo can only make small gestures at her while still staying in the shadows. Rimjim is dying to meet the man who leaves flowers on her doorstep every day, and built a bridge over a stream for her after she once fell in. Both men try to woo her from afar while still hiding their identities, as she remains alone but moved by these incredible gestures to her. It's only a matter of time before the undercover police officer and Interpol agent cross paths and things really begin to unravel in this action-fueled romance story.

== Cast ==
- Shakib Khan as IPS Romeo
- Bobby as Rimjim
- Amit Hasan as Boktiar
- Tanvir Khan as Abid
- Ilias Kobra as Ilias
- Shiba Shanu as Drug Dealer
- Don as Drug Dealer
- Kabila as Kabila

== Music ==
The soundtrack for the film is composed by Ali Akram Shuvo and Ahmed Humayun, with the lyrics penned by Kabir Bakul and Sudip Kumar Dip.

Tracklist
| No. | Title | Lyrics | singer(s) | Length |
|---|---|---|---|---|
| 1. | "Bhalobasha Hoye Jay (This song copied from Telugu song Vaana Vaana Velluvaye from movie Racha)" | Kabir Bakul | Atik Hasan and Dolly Sayontoni | 4:18 |
| 2. | "Jani Na Tumi Chara" | Kabir Bakul | | 3:47 |
| 3. | "Jekhane Jai Jeikhane (This song copied from Tamil song Paakatha from movie Aaru)" | Doly Sayontoni | Kabir Bakul | 4:12 |
| 4. | "Hello Darling Darling" | Kabir Bakul | Monir Khan and Tanjina Ruma | 4:29 |
| 5. | "Polare Polare Tui Aguner" | Kabir Bakul | Tanjina Ruma | 3:47 |
