= List of Bangladeshi films of 1995 =

An incomplete list of Bangladeshi films released in 1995.

== Releases ==
Title	Director	Cast	Genre	Notes	Release date	Ref.
Babar Adesh	Montazur Rahman Akbar	Manna and Chompa.	drama		20 January	
Muktir Gaan - Song of Freedom	Tareque Masud; Catherine Masud	Tareque Masud, Catherine Masud, Lear Levin	Documentary	Based on Bangladesh Liberation War		
Anya Jibon	Sheikh Neyamat Ali	Raisul Islam Asad, Champa, Abul Khair, Shanta Islam,				
Nodir Naam Modhumoti (The River Named Modhumoti)	Tanvir Mokammel	Aly Zaker, Tauquir Ahmed, Raisul Islam Asad, Afsana Mimi, Abul Khair, Vaswar Banerjee, Jayanta Chatterjee, K.S. Feroze	War, History, Drama	Based on Bangladesh Liberation War		
Love Story	Kazi Hayat	Rosy Siddiqui				
Denmohor	Shafi Bikrampuri	Salman Shah, Moushumi, Rajib, Ahmed Sharif, Nasir Khan, Mirana Zaman	Romance, Drama		3 March	
Konna dan	Delwar Jahan Jhantu	Salman Shah, Lima, Alamgir, Shabana, Humayun Faridi, Anwar Hossain	Drama		3 March	
Shopner Thikana	M A Khalek	Salman Shah, Shabnur, Rajib, Kazi Hayat, Prabir Mitra, Dolly Zahur	Romance		11 May	
Anjuman	Hafiz Uddin	Salman Shah, Shabnaz, Dolly Zahur, Ahmed Sharif, Humayun Faridi	Romance		18 August	
Moha Milon	Dilip Shom	Salman Shah, Shabnur, Bobita, Rajib, Pijush Bandhopadhyay, Amal Bose	Romance		22 September	
Banglar Nayok	Dewan Nazrul	Jashim, Shabana, Riaz, Anwar Hossain, Ahmed Sharif	Action			
Asha Bhalobasha	Tomiz Uddin Rizvi	Salman Shah, Shabnaz, Golam Mostafa, Prabir Mitra, Misha Sawdagor	Romance		1 December	

== See also ==
- 1995 in Bangladesh
