= Shajghor =

Bangladeshi film

- Poster
- Bengali: সাজঘর
- Directed by: Shah Alam Kiron
- Written by: Humayun Ahmed
- Screenplay by: Alamgir Khosru
- Starring: Manna; Moushumi; Nipun Akter; Kazi Hayat
- Cinematography: Golam Rabbani Biplob
- Edited by: Monir Hossain Munnu
- Music by: Imon Saha
- Distributed by: Impress Telefilm Limited
- Release date: 13 April 2007
- Country: Bangladesh
- Language: Bengali

Shajghor (Bengali: সাজঘর) is a 2007 Bangladeshi film directed by Shah Alam Kiron. The film was based on the story written by Humayun Ahmed. It features Manna, Moushumi, Nipun Akhter and Kazi Hayat in the lead roles. It won several National Film Awards including Best Supporting Actress.

== Cast ==
- Manna - Asif
- Moushumi - Leena
- Nipun Akter
- Kazi Hayat
- Prathorna Fardin Dighi
- Jamilur Rahman Shakha

== Soundtrack ==
The film soundtrack was composed by Imon Saha and lyrics penned by Shah Alam Sarker and Munshi Wadud.

== Awards ==
Award Title	Category	Awardee	Result
National Film Awards	Best Actress in a Supporting Role	Nipun Akter	Won
National Film Awards	Best Lyrics	Munshi Wadud	Won
National Film Awards	Best Male Playback Singer	Andrew Kishore	Won

== See also ==
- Daruchini Dwip
