= A K M Hasan =

Bangladeshi television actor (born 1974)

- Hasan at an event in Dhaka, 2019
- Born: Abu Khayer Mohammad Hasan; 31 March 1974 (age 52); Narayanganj, Bangladesh
- Education: National University
- Occupation: Actor
- Years active: 1990s–present
- Known for: Ronger Manush, Sakin Sarisuri, Harkipte

Abu Khayer Mohammad Hasan (born 31 March 1974), known professionally as A K M Hasan or simply Hasan, is a Bangladeshi television actor. He is best known for comic roles, though he has also played serious parts. He came to wider attention as a cowherd in Salauddin Lavlu's television play Ronger Manush, and was nominated for the Meril-Prothom Alo Critics' Award for Best TV Actor for A Journey by Politics (2011).

== Early life ==
Hasan was born in 1974 in Narayanganj District. He studied at Adarsha School in Narayanganj and later at Tolaram College, and completed his graduation at a college affiliated with the National University. He was drawn to acting from childhood.

== Career ==
Hasan began acting on stage with the Aranyak theatre group, appearing in a number of productions before moving into television. He became widely known through his role in Salauddin Lavlu's Ronger Manush. In 2008 he appeared in the film Doctor Bari.

He has been a regular presence in Eid television programming. Among his Eid dramas are the serial Mr. Sultan, directed by Sakhawat Manik and also starring Zahid Hasan, and Noshu Villain, directed by Sagor Jahan and starring Chanchal Chowdhury. In 2019 he played in the television serials Kisti Kader and Dengue Naser, both directed by Masud Karim Sujan. The same year he played twins for the first time in the web drama Bap Beta 420, directed by Nayan Milton and released on the Srishti Multimedia YouTube channel, and 30 of his television plays and mini-serials were broadcast across channels during Eid al-Adha. In 2021 his Eid play Dhonnobad was broadcast on NTV.

Hasan, Mosharraf Karim and Shamim Zaman, who have worked together since the early 1990s, reunited for the television series Shadi Mubarak, written by Ahammad Shahabuddin and directed by Zaman, in which the three play brothers. It premiered on Maasranga Television.

== Awards and nominations ==
Year	Award	Category	Work	Result	Ref.
2012	Meril Prothom Alo Awards	Best TV Actor (Critics')	A Journey by Politics	Nominated	
2019	RTV Star Award	Best Actor in a Supporting Role (Serial)	Cheating Master	Nominated	
