= Shafi Bikrampuri =

Bangladeshi film director and producer (1943–2023)

- শফি বিক্রমপুরী
- Born: Shafiur Rahman; 4 July 1943; Bikrampur, Munshiganj, Dhaka Division, Bengal Province, British India (present-day Bangladesh)
- Died: 18 October 2023 (aged 80); Bangkok, Thailand
- Resting place: Sreenagar Upazila, Munshiganj
- Years active: 1965–2000
- Notable work: Denmohor
- Children: 2

Shafi Bikrampuri (4 July 1943 – 18 October 2023) was a Bangladeshi film director and producer. He is best known for Denmohor (1995) which is the remake of superhit Bollywood film Sanam Bewafa.

== Career ==
Bikrampuri started his career as a film distributor in 1964 with the Hollywood films Fantomas and Angélique. He also distributed Subhash Dutta directed film Arunodoyer Agnishakkhi in 1972.

Bikrampuri made his film debut as a producer by jointly producing the movie Gunai Bibi. He produced many hit movies including, Bahadur, Daku Mansur and Raj Dulari. The noted filmmaker made his directorial debut with Raj Dulari in 1978. Shabana, Nuton, Wasim, Jashim and many others acted in the film.
The folk fantasy magic movies produced by Shafi Vikrampuri, Daku Mansoor, Bahadur and Rajdulari became superhits consecutively, creating a surprise in the film industry. He has made several films like Jibon Trishna, Shaanti-Ashanti, Jajsaheb, Abujh Moner Valobasha, Shobuj Shathi, Den Mohor, Sokal Sandhya, Matir Kole, and Shashi Punnu.

Bikrampuri built two cinema halls named ‘Padma’ and ‘Surma’ in Malibagh, Dhaka in 1989. Besides, he served as the President of Dhaka and Narayanganj Cinema Hall Owners Association for a long time. He was even a member of the Bangladesh Film Censor Board.

== Personal life and death ==
Bikrampuri was born on 4 July 1943, at Mottogram under Srinagar upazila in Munshiganj (formerly Bikrampur Pargana). He started living in Dhaka with his family from 1948. He was married to Nasima Sultana and had two children. He established Jamuna Films Limited in his daughter's name. Besides he was also active in politics.

Bikrampuri died while undergoing treatment at a hospital in Bangkok on 18 October 2023, at the age of 80.
