= Shesh Khela =

Bangladeshi drama film

- Poster
- Directed by: Noor Hossain Bolai
- Screenplay by: Noor Hossain Bolai
- Story by: Imrul Sahed
- Starring: Manna; Chompa; Wasimul Bari Rajib; Ahmed Sharif
- Music by: Alam Khan
- Release date: 9 October 1992
- Running time: 165 minutes
- Country: Bangladesh
- Language: Bengali

Shesh Khela is a 1992 Bangladeshi drama film. The film was directed by Noor Hossain Bolai. The film stars Manna and Chompa in lead roles.

== Synopsis ==
The film's story revolves around an immigrant educated young man's life.

== Cast ==
- Manna
- Chompa
- Wasimul Bari Rajib
- Ahmed Sharif
- Sharmili Ahmed
- Black Anwar

== Soundtrack ==
The film's songs are composed by Alam Khan and penned by Moniruzzaman Monir

- "Sundor Sondhyay" - Runa Laila, Andrew Kishore, Syed Abdul Hadi
- "Je Banailo Tomare Jotno Kore" - Runa Laila, Andrew Kishore
- "Tumi Ja Bhebechho Amay" - Sabina Yasmin
- "Kachhe Ele Jibon Pai" - Sabina Yasmin, Andrew Kishore
