= Tomake Chai =

Bengali song

Song by Kabir Suman

from the album Tomake Chai
- Language: Bangla
- Released: 1992
- Recorded: four track tape recorder
- Length: 6:18
- Label: His Master's Voice
- Songwriter: Kabir Suman

Music video
- Tomake Chai - Kabir Suman on YouTube

Tomake Chai (Bengali: তোমাকে চাই; "I Want You" or "I Yearn for You") is a 1992 released Bengali song by Kabir Suman from the album Tomake Chai. This song, which used several new form of technology, is the first song of the album (total 12 songs), which also happened to be the artist's first solo album. This song (along with the album) is often considered as milestone and the one which changed the Bengali music forever. This iconic song was initially directed towards a woman but after few lines got "quickly overshadowed by his [Suman's] love for Calcutta".

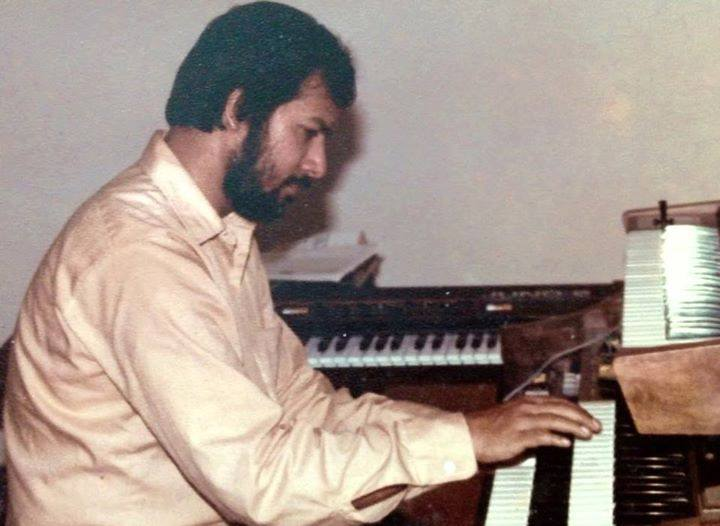
Kabir Suman.
