= Suborna Shirin =

Bangladeshi actress

- সুবর্ণ শিরীন
- Occupation: Actor
- Years active: 1985–present
- Awards: National Film Awards (2nd times)

Suborna Shirin (Bengali: সুবর্ণ শিরীন) is a Bangladeshi film and television actress. She was awarded Bangladesh National Film Award for Best Supporting Actress for her role in the film Biraj Bou.

== Notable films ==
- Shuvoda (1986)
- Rajlakshmi Srikanta (1987)
- Biraj Bou (1988)
- Sokhinar Juddho (1984)

== Awards ==
| Year | Award | Category | Film | Result |
|---|---|---|---|---|
| 1987 | National Film Awards | Best Child Artist | Rajlakshmi Srikanta | Won |
| 1988 | National Film Awards | Best Supporting Actor | Biraj Bou | Won |
