= Biplob =

Bangladeshi lead singer and guitarist

Biplob বিপ্লব
- Born: Khalid Ataul Karim; Dhaka, Bangladesh
- Genres: Hard rock
- Occupations: Singer, songwriter, actor
- Instruments: Guitar; bass; vocals
- Years active: 1986–present
- Labels: Sargam; Soundtek; Sangeeta

Biplob (born Khalid Ataul Karim) is a Bangladeshi singer, composer, lyricist, and actor. He is best known as the founding member and lead vocalist of the rock band Prometheus. In 2015, he acted in a villain role in the film Game. He is regarded as one of the celebrated vocalists of Bangladesh in the 1990s.

== Early life ==
Biplob was born in Dhaka, Bangladesh and spent most of his early life in the Mohammadpur area. His birth name is Khalid Ataul Karim. His father, Abu Taher, was a professor at the Government Music College and his mother is Jahanara Alam Chowdhury. Biplob became involved with music from childhood through his family background.

== Music career ==
In the early 1980s, Biplob was a member of a band named Cupid. On 17 July 1986, he formed the band Prometheus with Quyel, Rezwan, Arif, Bulbul, Shareq and started his professional music career as the band's lead vocalist.

Two years later, the band released its first album, Swadhinota Chai. The group also released several collaborative albums with other artists. In 2012, the band released its latest album, Amader Poth. A total of 18 albums have been released by the band.

Besides his work with the band, Biplob has released several solo albums and also performed songs for films. Patriotism, contemporary social issues and love are the main themes of many of his songs. During the anti-autocracy movement of the 1990s, after the killing of Dhaka Medical College teacher Shamsul Alam Khan Milon, he wrote the song "Miloner Rokto" in 1990. The song became popular among listeners.

== Albums ==
=== Band albums ===
Prometheus released 18 albums with Biplob as the lead vocalist. These include:

- Swadhinota Chai (1987)
- Muktir Prottashay (1990)
- Projonmer Songram (1992)
- Slogan (1995)
- Joddha (1999)
- Prometheus 2000 (2000)
- Smritir Kopat (2001)
- O-Aa (2002)
- Pathshala
- Dhol
- Taka
- Nagordola
- Rajpath
- Prometheus Unbound
- Prometheus Unbound One
- Chhayapath
- Amader Poth
- Solo albums

Biplob also released several solo albums. Notable albums include:

- Lottery (2002)
- Amar Kono Tension Nei (2016)

== Acting career ==
Biplob and Prometheus appeared in song sequences in three films. The band first appeared in a music sequence in the 2004 film Rajdhani, directed by Mohammad Hossain Jemmy. They performed in a song in the 2009 film Chander Moto Bou, directed by Mohammad Hossain.

In the 2015 film Dui Beyair Kirti, directed by Abdullah Al Mamun, Biplob performed in a song sequence with Azam Khan and Hasan. In the same year, Biplob acted as a villain in the film Game, directed by Jahidur Rahman Royal.

== Personal life ==
Biplob is married to Aileen. The couple has two sons and one daughter. Since 2016, he has lived with his family in Queens, New York City.
