= Nasir Khan (Bangladeshi actor) =

Bangladeshi actor

- Born: Nasir Khan; 17 September 1959
- Died: 12 January 2007 (aged 47); Mathbaria, Pirojpur District
- Citizenship: Bangladeshi
- Education: Jagannath University
- Occupation: Actor
- Years active: 1980–2007
- Spouse: Meherunnesa Shopna
- Children: Three daughters

Nasir Khan (17 September 1959 – 12 January 2007) was a Bangladeshi actor, known mainly for playing villain roles. He appeared in more than 500 Bangladeshi films. Some of his notable films include Beder Meye Josna, Ontore Ontore, Bikkhov, Ei Ghar Ei Songshar, and Pagol Mon.

== Early and personal life ==
Nasir Khan was born on 17 September 1959 in Mathbaria, Pirojpur. He had three daughters: Nasima Khanom Momota, Fahima Khanom Shormita, and Mohima Khanom Nishita. At the time of his death, Nishita was only 1 year old.

== Career ==
Nasir Khan acted in over 500 Bangladeshi films. He was mostly known as a villain. Many of his dialogue lines are still remembered by audiences, such as: "Mama bolto bhagne beshi lobh korisne" (Uncle used to say, nephew don’t be too greedy), "Amar doya ache kintu maya nai" (I have mercy but no affection), "Kotha kom kaj beshi manushke ami boro bhalobashi" (I love people who talk less and work more), "Amar dukhkho ache kintu koshto nai" (I have sorrow but no suffering), and "Murubbi ja bole buddhi manra shei mot chole" (The wise follow the advice of elders).

Among his films are Beder Meye Josna, Ontore Ontore, Bikkhov, Ei Ghar Ei Songshar, and Bhondo. He also became popular among children by acting in several fantasy films such as Alif Laila, Superman, and Robin Hood. Despite his huge contribution, he did not receive any state or national award.

During his student life, he served as the cultural secretary of Jagannath University’s student union. He was vice-president of the Bangladesh Film Artistes’ Association and remained its most-voted executive member until his death. In recognition of his popularity, the street where he lived is now known as “Nasir Khan’s Goli”.

== Filmography ==
- Shabnam (2014)
- Jiddi Bou (2012)
- Tumi Ki Shei (2009)
- Bullet (2007)
- Moydan (2007)
- Captain Maruf (2007)
- Ulta Palta 69 (2007)
- Dapot (2006)
- Bhondo Neta (2004)
- Bhaiyer Shatru Bhai (2004)
- Jiboner Guarantee Nai (2004)
- Ajker Shomaj (2004)
- Big Boss (2003)
- Bhaiya (2002)
- Mastaner Upor Mastan (2002)
- Shopner Bashor (2001)
- Shikari (2001) – Shafik
- Rongbaz Badsha (2001)
- Thekao Mastan (2001) – Police officer
- Hira Chuni Panna (2000)
- Moron Kamor (1999)
- Ononto Valobasha (1999)
- Bhondo (1998)
- Hangor Nodi Grenade (1997)
- Shopner Nayok (1997) – (also directed)
- Mayer Odhikar (1996)
- Ei Ghor Ei Songsar (1996) – Akkel Ali
- Denmohor (1995)
- Sneho (1994) – Nasir Khan
- Balika Holo Bodhu (1994)
- Bikkhov (1994)
- Ontore Ontore (1994)
- Beder Meye Josna (1989) – Mobarak
- Gariyal Bhai
- Rokkhosh
- Mastan
- Shirsher Shontrashi
- Greftar
- Shomrat
- Khudha
- Chirodiner Sathi
- Akorshon
- Kuchboron Konna
- Lutroraj
- Ter Panda Ek Gunda
- Noya Kosai

== Death ==
Nasir Khan died on 12 January 2007 at the age of 47.

== See also ==
- List of Bangladeshi actors
