= Manna (actor) =

Bangladeshi film actor and producer (1964–2008)

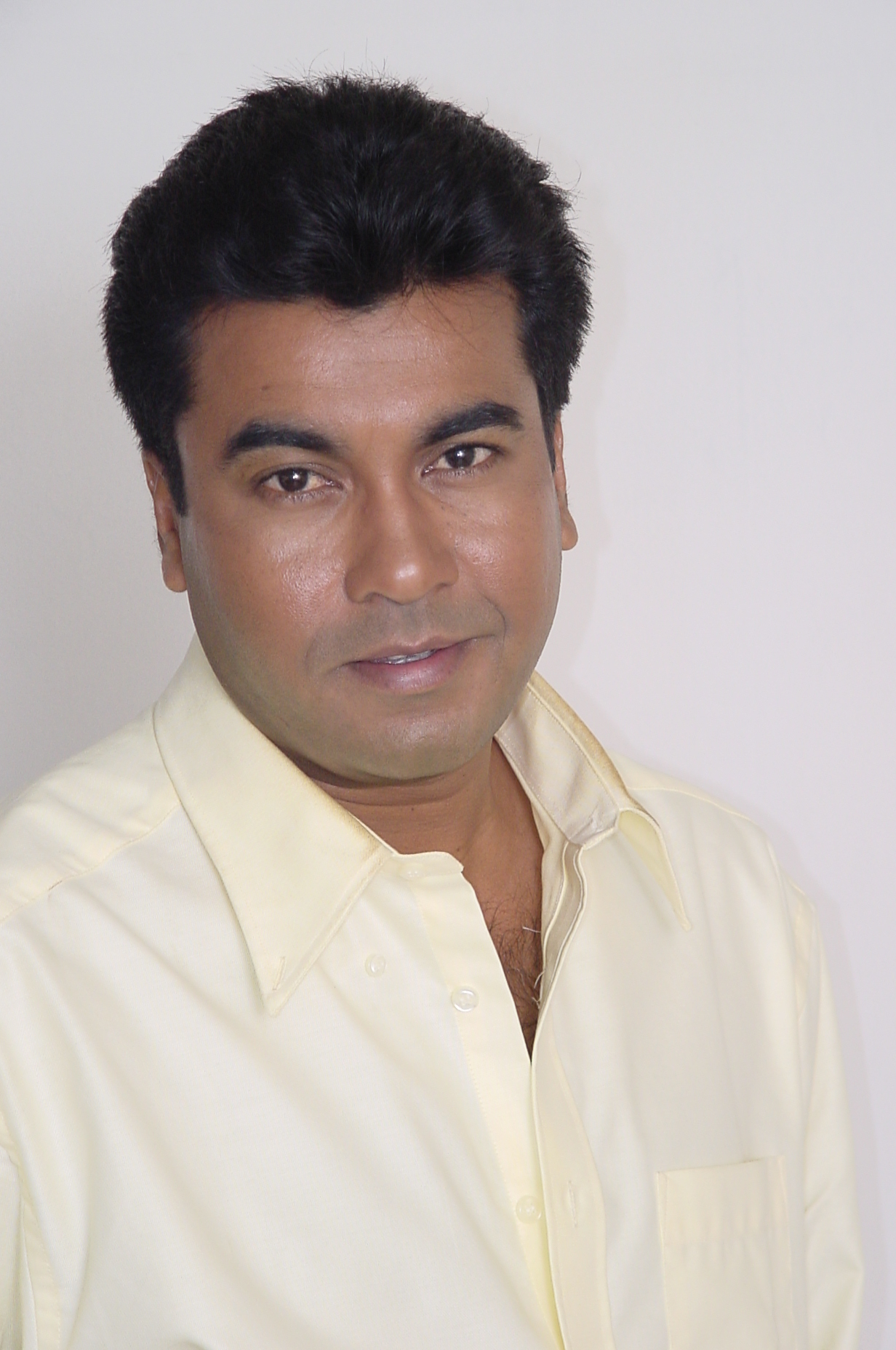
- Portrait of Manna
- Born: SM Aslam Talukder Manna; 14 April 1964; Tangail, East Pakistan
- Died: 17 February 2008 (aged 43); Gulshan, Dhaka, Bangladesh
- Other name: Manna Bhai
- Education: Dhaka College; Bindu Basini Govt. Boys' High School
- Occupations: Actor; film producer
- Years active: 1984–2008
- Organization: Kritanjoli Films
- Works: Filmography
- Spouse: Shelly Quader
- Children: 1 (Siam Illtemash)
- Parents: SM Nurul Islam Talukder (father); Hasina Talukder (mother)
- Awards: National Film Award; Meril-Prothom Alo Awards; Bachsas Awards

Signature
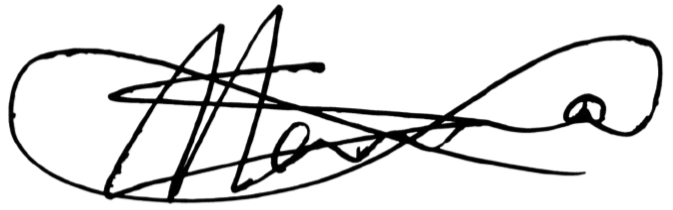

Syed Mohammad Aslam Talukder (Bengali: সৈয়দ মোহাম্মদ আসলাম তালুকদার; 14 April 1964 – 17 February 2008), known by his stage name Manna (মান্না), was a Bangladeshi film actor and producer. His first released film was Pagli (1986). He got his debut as a lead role in the film Kashem Malar Prem (1991), directed by Mustafa Anwar.

Though initially not successful as a lead actor and starting as a side actor in films such as Tauba, Nishpap, Desh Premik, Bhai, Baap Beta 420, Bhaier Ador, Janer Baji, Jadrel Bou, Choto Bou, Sipahi, Goriber Bondhu, Strir Shopno, Sottobadi, Obuj Sontan, Fashi, and Sakkhi Proman. He slowly built his stardom with his performances in films such as Chadabaz, Kasem Malar Prem, Ondho Prem, Moha Sommelon, Jonotar badshah, Amma, Premier Smriti, Bhai, Sesh Songram, Bishal Akromon, Shadi Mobarok, Sesh Protikkha, Chokranter Shikari, Danga, Andolon, Shakkat, Deshdrohi, Babar Adesh, Ali Baba, Shesh Khela, Traash, Loot Toraz - The Plunder, Matribhumi, Gorom Hawa, Teji, Deshdorodi, Ajker Sontrashi, Criminal, Ondho Ain, Bishal Akromon, Lathi, Sesh Songram, and Ruti. With the unfortunate death of Salman Shah, and Jashim as well as Ilias Kanchan stepping away, Manna finally became the top hero of the Bangladesh film industry. With films such as Dhar, Dushmon Duniya, Uttarer Khep, Koshto, Bortoman, Raja, Rangbaz Badshah, Gunda Number One, Abar Ekti Juddho, Panja, Boma Hamla, Big Boss, Top Samrat, Swami Strir Juddho, and Dui Bodhu Ek Swami, Manna kept on breaking records and became an action sensation within the Bangladesh film industry.

As the 1990s came to an end, his roles in films such as Shanto Keno Mastan, Ammajan, Amader Sontan, Pita Matar Amanat, Kukkhato Khuni, Bortoman, Dhakaiya Mastan, Saajghor, Villain, Kabuliwala, Khomotar Gorom, Top Samrat, Teji Purush, Ulta Palta 69, Mastaner Upor Mastan, Rajdhani, Aghat Palta Aghat, Babar Kosom, Jogot Shongshar, Maa Babar Swapno, Major Shaheb, Shotru Shotru Khela, Bir Soinik, and Mayer Morjada broke the records for most successful box office films in Bangladesh in the modern era until Shakib Khan's Priya Amar Priya broke it. He earned numerous accolades in his long career, including one National Film Award, three Meril-Prothom Alo Awards, and five Bachsas Awards. He earned a Bangladesh National Film Award for Best Actor for his role in the film Bir Soinik (2003). He died 17 February 2008 due to heart failure.

== Early and family life ==
Manna was born on 14 April 1964 to a Bengali taluqdar family of Muslim Syeds in the village of Elenga in Tangail District, East Pakistan. He was the son of Syed Mohammad Nurul Islam Talukder (d. 1997) and his mother, Hasina Islam (d. 2019). He has 1 brother and 2 sisters. His sister Farzana Jahan died on 14 February 2009. His paternal grandparents were Syed Mohammad Musa Talukder and Mumtaz Mahal (d. 1987). His paternal great-uncles were Syed Mohammad Ibrahim Talukder and Syed Mohammad Isa Talukder. He has 9 paternal uncles, one of them being Syed Mohammad Nawab Ali Talukder. He has a paternal cousin named Faruq Talukder. Manna was married to Shelly Manna, and together they have one son Siam Iltemash (b. 1994).

== Career ==
After completing his secondary education, Manna moved to Dhaka, the capital city of Bangladesh, to pursue his dream of becoming an actor. Manna's career was initiated in 1984 after he was discovered through a talent search programmed by the Bangladesh Film Development Corporation. In 1986, he started his acting career with the film Touba, directed by Azharul Islam Khan. But his first released film was Pagli. In 1991, he got his debut as a lead role in the film Kashem Malar Prem, directed by Mustafa Anwar. However, it was his role in the 1991 film Danga that catapulted him to stardom and made him a household name in Bangladesh.

In his 24-year career, he has acted in more than three hundred films, including action films, romantic dramas, and comedies. On average, Manna acted in 10 films each year. He was known for his versatility as an actor and his ability to portray a wide range of characters. Some of his notable films include Shesh Khela|(1992), Babar Adesh (1995), Shanto Keno Mastan (1998), and Ammajan (1999). Manna quickly established himself as one of the most influential Dhallywood actors.

Manna was the General Secretary of the Bangladesh Film Actors Association. As the general secretary, he was active in the ongoing movement against vulgarity in the Dhallywood film industry.

Montajur Rahman Akbar's Shanto Keno Mastan and Ke Amar Baba were released in 1998 and 1999. In 1999, the film Ammajan, directed by Kazi Hayat, was released. The film established Manna in a permanent position in Bangla film history, as it was one of the most successful commercial films in Bengali film history.

Among films released last year, he played lead roles in commercially successful films including Saajghor, Khomotar Garom, Moner Shathey Juddho, Machine-man, Ulta Palta 69, and Shotru Shotru Khela. Manna received several prestigious awards, including a National Film Award for Best Actor in 2005.

As an action hero, Manna acted in collaboration with action director Kazi Hayat's 20 films and Montazur Rahman Akbar's 22 films.

=== Early career (1984–1990) ===
Manna was selected in 1984 in a search for a new face organized by the Bangladesh Film Development Corporation (FDC). Acting in the 1985 film Pagli, directed by Kazi Hayat, he made his film debut. Although his first film was Taoba . He then starred opposite Nipa Mona Lisa in Shimul Parul (1985), Nispaap (1986) opposite Rehana Jolly, Baap Beta 420 (1987) against Kobita, Bhai (1987) against Champa, Amar Jaan (1988), Badsha against Sunetra Bhai (1989), Cobra (1989), Goriber bondhu opposite Champa (1990), Amma (1990), and Nishpap Shishu (1990), opposite Rani Stree . He acted in films like Palki (1990) and Dukhi Ma (1990).

=== Establishment profit (1991–1996) ===
Manna starred opposite Champa for the first time in the 1991 film Kashem Malar Prem, directed by Mostafa Anwar. Since the film was a commercial success, he also got a chance to work in a few films.

In 1992, he also starred as a solo actor in Kazi Hayat's Danga and Traash. In the same year, he starred in Mostafa Anwar's Andh Prem, Montazur Rahman Akbar's Prem Diwana and Disco Dancer, Pitar Adesh of Montazur Rahman Akbar, Shadi Mubarak of Ashok Ghosh, Gorom Haoya of Bulbul Ahmed, Sakkhat of Saiful Azam Kashem, Kamal Ahmed's Obuj Shishu, Delwar Jahan Jhantu's Goriber Bondu are released.

In 1993, he starred in Kazi Hayat's Chadabaaz, Sepahi, Deshdrohi, Dhar, Teji, Somaj ke bodle dao, Nur Hossain Balair's Ora Tin jon and Sesh Khela, Nadeem Mahmud's Andolan, Ruti and Rajpather Raja, MA Malek's Durnitibaj, FI Manik's Bishal Akraman, Mostafizur Rahman Babur's Chirorini, AJ Rana directed Manush, directed by Belal Ahmed. He has acted in films like Sakshi Praman and Bashira, directed by Montazur Rahman Akbar.

=== Success and popularity (1997–2008) ===
Manna produced the 1997 film LootToraz, directed by Kazi Hayat, starring Moushumi and Diti opposite him. The film was also a commercial success. Then Enayet Karim's Hunger Burning, Ispahani Arif Jahan's Mostafa Bhai, Delwar Jahan Jhantu's Raja Bangladeshi, etc. films are released.

Released in 1999, he starred in the Kazi Hayat-directed film 'Ammajan', where he co-starred with Shabnam, Amin Khan, and Moushumi . He won first Bachsas Award and Meril Prothom Alo Awards for his performance in the film. In the same year, he directed Raihan Mujib and Aziz Ahmed Babul's Khabar Hare, Malek Afsary's film Lal Badshah, which he also produced.

In 2000, his third film, Abbajan, was released. It won the Bacchus Award in two categories. The same year he Malek Afsari directed Death Bite, Chhatku Ahmed Managed End War, Montazur Rahman Akbar's "Gunda Number One", "Infamous Killer", "Hit Counter Hit", "Mastan on Mastan" and "Life is a Clash", Kazi Hayat's Present, F I Manik Sultan, Badiul Alam Khokon ' "Monster", "Husband and Wife's War", directed by F I Manik, which is also the fourth film he has produced, and "Change Society", directed by Kazi Hayat. In 2003, he acted in the film Bir Soinik based on the story of the liberation war directed by Delwar Jahan Jhantu. " Through this film he won the Best Actor in the National Film Award. Bir Soinik directed by Jahan Jhantu and released in 2003. This year, Zillur Rahman directed "Imandar Mastan", Ispahani Arif Jahan, directed by "Nayak", Kazi Hayat's "Minister" and "Kasht" ', Malek Afsari's' Boma Hamla, Wet Cat, directed by Shahidul Islam Khokon, FI Manik directed and self-produced Two Brides One Husband, Mostafi Jur Rahman Babu's Ashanto Agun , Villain , directed by Ispahani Arif Jahan, Montazur Rahman Akbar's "Arman" and "Top Samrat", Shahadat Hossain Liton directed Kathin Purush, Badiul Alam Khokon directed Rustam, FI Manik's' 'Bhaiya' ', starring opposite him Indian film actress Rachna Banerjee, Badiul Alam Khokon's Destruction, Father's Oath and Real Films like Shahin-Sumon, Neta, Monwar Khokon's Satyer Vijay, Sharif Uddin Khan Dipur's Bachao Desh, Ahmed Nasir's War with Mind were released.

== Death ==
Manna died on 17 February 2008 at the United Hospital Limited, Gulshan, Dhaka, Bangladesh, following a heart attack at the age of 43. He was laid on his village home Elenga in Tangail, Bangladesh after his father.
