= Malek Afsari =

Bangladeshi film director

Malek Afsary
- Born: Noakhali, Bangladesh
- Occupations: Film director and producer
- Spouse: Rosy Afsary

YouTube information
- Channel: Malek Afsary Official
- Years active: 2020-present

Malek Afsary is a Bangladeshi film director and YouTuber, who has directed 24 films. Afsary began his career as an Assistant Director in the early 1970s. He made his film debut as an Assistant Director in the film Piyasi Mon. He then wrote the story for the film Lutera and the dialogue for the film Kar Pape. He made his directorial debut in 1983 with the film Ghorer Bou. He is best known for his film Ei Ghor Ei Songshar in 1996 and Password in 2019.

== Personal life ==
He married actress Rosy Samad in 1981.

== Career ==
He achieved fame directing Salman Shah featured Ei Ghor Ei Songshar (1996), even though the film was a box office flop. Then in 2000 he worked with Shakib Khan for the first time in the action film Hira Chuni Panna, Thekao Mastan (2001), Ulta Palta 69 (2007), Moner Jala (2011), Full and Final (2013), Antor Jala (2017), In 2019 he teamed up with Shakib Khan again in the action thriller Password, which was Khan own production. It was a box office blockbuster and also one of the highest grossing Bangladeshi film of all-time. After his business operated by his wife was hit by the COVID-19 pandemic, he opened a YouTube channel and started uploading videos. His directorial debut was the 1983 film Ghorer Bou.

== Filmography ==
=== As a director ===
- Ghorer Bou (1983)
- Geet (1984)
- Golmaal (1986)
- Rastar Raja (1986)
- Dhoni Gorib (1987)
- Khati Puron (1989)
- Sonar Songshar (1989)
- Khoma (1992)
- Grina (1994)
- Durjoy (1996)
- Ei Ghor Ei Songshar (1996)
- Mrittur Mukhe (1998)
- Laal Baadshah (1999)
- Moron Kamor (1999)
- Raja (1999)
- Hira Chuni Panna (2000)
- Thekao Mastan (2001)
- Boma Hamla (2002)
- Ami Jail Theke Bolchi (2005)
- Ulta Palta 69 (2007)
- Moner Jala (2011)
- Full and Final (2013)
- Antor Jala (2017)
- Password (2019)

=== As a producer ===
- Ei Ghor Ei Songsar (1996)
- Moron Kamor (1999)
- Hira Chuni Panna (2000)
- Thekao Mastan (2001)
- Ulta Palta 69 (2007)
