= Kanak Chapa =

Bangladeshi singer

- কনক চাঁপা
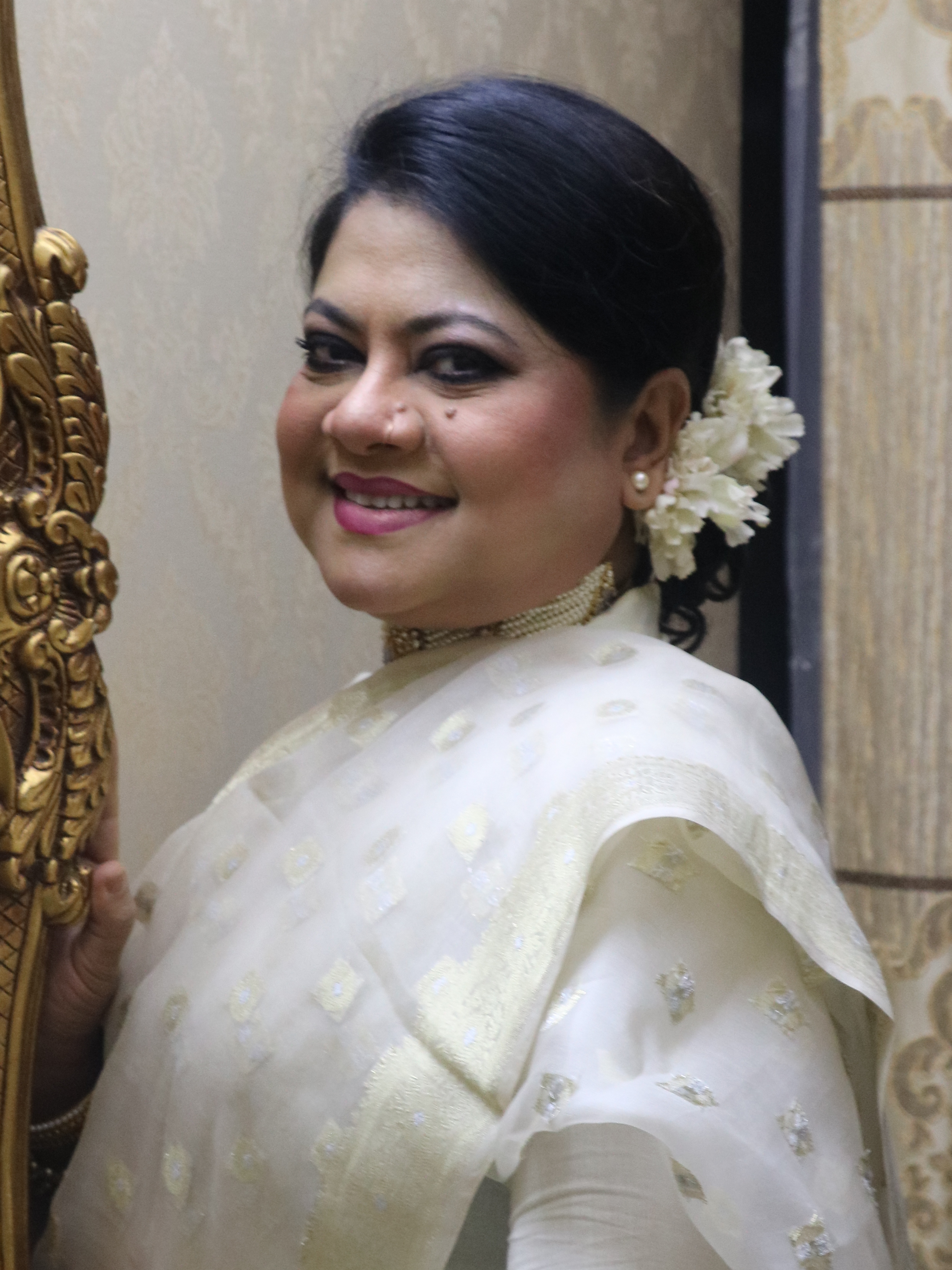
- Chapa in 2019
- Born: Rumana Morshed Kanak Chapa; 11 September 1969 (age 57); Dhaka, Bangladesh
- Education: Viqarunnisa Noon School and College
- Occupations: Singer, Writer, YouTuber
- Years active: 1984–present
- Political party: Bangladesh Nationalist Party
- Parents: Azizul Huque Morshed (father); Momena Jahan (mother)
- Awards: See full list
- Website: kanakchapa.com

Kanak Chapa (née Rumana Morshed Kanak Chapa; born 11 September 1969) is a Bangladeshi singer. She received the Bangladesh National Film Award for Best Female Playback Singer three times, for her performance in the films Love Story (1995), Premer Taj Mahal (2001) and Ek Takar Bou (2008). She published her autobiography Sthobir Jajabor in 2011 and a poetry book Mukhomukhi Joddha in 2012.

== Early life ==
Kanak Chapa was born as Rumana Morshed on 11 September 1969 in Dhaka at Holy Family Hospital to Azizul Huque Morshed (born 27 October 1933; died 29 December 2009) and Momena Jahan. Her parents were cousins and they got married on 20 January 1960. She is the third among five siblings. She has 2 older sisters Parul & Rotna, and 2 younger brothers. She got her first music lessons from her father. During her career, she sang almost 3 thousand songs and released over 30 solo albums. In 1978, she made her television debut. As a child singer, she became a champion in Notun Kuri in the year 1978. She received championship award for "Jatiyo Shishu Protijogita" for three years in a row. She was under the guidance of artist Ustad Basir Ahmed for 12 years.

== Education ==
From a very young age, Kanak Chapa's father gave her the initial training in singing. Morshed was an amateur singer and also a painter who was a student of Zainul Abedin. Kanak Chapa was born in a conservative family. So her painting was not welcomed eventually and her father did not want her to paint as a career. Kanak Chapa completed her school from Madartek Abdul Aziz High School. Later she went to Viqarunnisa Noon School and College for her HSC.

== Personal life ==
Kanak Chapa is married to music director and composer Moinul Islam Khan (born 25 January 1957) on 6 December 1984. She got married at the age of 15 and her husband was 27 years old. Together, they have one son, Faizul Islam Khan (born 15 November 1987), and one daughter, Faria Islam Khan (born 27 November 1990). Along with 2 children, she has 5 grandchildren. Faria got married in 2009 at 18 years old. Faria has been residing Australia with her husband Abdullah Mohammad Yahya (CEO and Director of Alta Vista Trading) and their 3 kids since 2024.

Kanak Chapa competed from the Sirajganj-1 constituency in the 2018 Bangladeshi general election with the nomination from Bangladesh Nationalist Party and lost to Mohammed Nasim from Bangladesh Awami League.

== Career ==
=== Singing ===
She sang more than 3500 songs, did playback in about 2000 films. About 40 albums of her had been released and till now they are very popular. She had performed in more than 4000 stage shows. She had shared the stage with the likes of Subir Nandi, Andrew Kishore, Kumar Bishwajit, Monir Khan and other artists of Bangladesh.

=== Writing ===
Apart from singing, Kanak Chapa is an accomplished writer. She has written columns and fictions in many leading newspapers and online portals. She has published a total of 6 books: Sthobir Jajabor, Mukhomukhi Joddha Megher Danay Chore, Boikata Ghuri: Kataghuri 1, Boikata Ghuri: Kataghuri 2. The last two are her autobiography consisting of two volumes and was published in 2020.

=== YouTube ===
Kanak Chapa has 2 YouTube channels called Rumana Morshed Kanak Chapa and Kanak Chapa's Kitchen.

== Works ==
Albums

- Abar Eshechi Firey (2011)
- Poddo Pata (2013)
- Arale (2014)
- Poddo Pukor (2015)

Writer

- Sthobir Jajabor (2011)
- Mukhomukhi Joddha (2012)
- Megher Danay Chore (2016)
- Kata Ghurhi (2018)
- Shei Pothe Jao (2019)
- Kata Ghurhi 2 (2019)

Notable songs

- Elo Melo Chule Lalater Vaj
- Nilanjona Namey Deko Na
- Tumito Durer Ekhon
- O Sathire Aay
- Rokto Ranga Shondha Robi
- Tumi Amar Swapno
- Tumi Megh Dekhecho
- Amar Hridoy Ekta Ayna
- Amar Valobashar Shokol Duar
- Ek Bindu Valobasha Dao
- Chokher Vitor Swapno Thake
- Kichu Kichu Manusher Jibone
- Koto Manush Vober Bajare
- Tumi Amar Emoni Ekjon
- Ekdin Tomake Na Dekhle
- Bajare Jachai Kore Dekhinito Daam
- Amar Premer Tajmohol
- Onek Sadhonar Pore Ami
- Ananta Prem Tumi Dao Aamake
- Je Deshete Sahid Minar

=== Patriotic songs ===
Film/Album	Song	Composer(s)	Writer(s)	Co-artist(s)
Single	"Aayre Aay Dhan Shaliker Gaay "			

=== Folk songs ===
Film/Album	Song	Composer(s)	Writer(s)	Co-artist(s)
Single	"Amay Eto Raate"			
Single	"Bhromor Koiyo Giya"			

=== Compilation songs ===
Film/Album	Song	Composer(s)	Writer(s)	Co-artist(s)
"Akash Prodeep Jole"	Lata Mangeshkar	Satinath Mukherjee		
"Akashe Aaj Ronger Khela"	Asha Bhosle			
"Jare Ure Jare Pakhi"	Lata Mangeshkar	Salil Choudhury		
"Ogo Aar KLichuto Noy"	Lata Mangeshkar	Salil Chowdhury		
"Ami Tar Chholonay Vulbo na"	Sanndhya Mukherjee	Robin Chatterjee		
"Kotha Hoyechilo"	Asha Bhosle	R. D. Burman		
"Ami Mela Theke"	Pratima Banerjee			
"Emon Ekta Jhinuk"	Nirmala Mishra			
"Jole Bhasha Poddo Ami"	Pratima Banerjee			
"Ogo Brishti Amar"	Haimanti Shukla			
"O Tota Pakhire"	Nirmala Mishra			
"Kichukhon Aro Nahoy"	Sandhya Mukherjee			
"Moyna Go"	Lata Mangeshkar	Salil Chowdhury		

=== Miscellaneous songs ===
Film/Album	Song	Composer(s)	Writer(s)	Co-artist(s)
Single	"Aaj Bikeler Daake"			
Single	"Aaj Tobe Eituku Thak"			
Single	"Khola Akash"			
Single	"Bansh Baganer Mathar Upor"			
Single	"Ami Obujher Moto"			
Single	"Nisshas Amar Tumi"			Asif Akbar
Single	"Tomar Majhe Ami"			Asif
Single	"Notun Chander Notun Alo"			Andrew Kishore
Single	"O Saathire"			Andrew Kishore
Single	"Saathi Peyechi"			Andrew Kishore
Single	"Shoto Bochor Aage"			Andrew Kishore
Single	"Ei Raat Okkhoy Hok"		Rafiquzzaman	Kumar Sanu
Single	"Kokila Eibuke Keno"			Kumar Biswajit
Kothin protishodh	"Tumi Bhalobasha Amari"			Kumar Biswajit
Single	"Shojoni Amito Tomay Bhulini"			Tapan Chowdhury
Single	"Chitay Tule Dile"			
Single	"Nilanjona NMame Dekona"			
Single	"Shawono Raate Jodi"	Kazi Nazrul Islam	Kazi Nazrul Islam	
Single	"Adho Raate Jodi Ghum Bhenge Jaay"			
Single	"Akasher Oi Mitimiti Tarar Sone"			
Dukjhini Johura	"Amar Mon Churi Koira Nao"			
Single	"Tumi Basor Ghore"			Andrew Kishore
Single	"Tomake Kotokhani Chai"			Monir Khan
Single	"Koto Dukkho Diya Doyal"			Monir Khan
Single	"Prem Sotti"			Monir Khan
Single	"Royecho Hridoye"			Monir Khan
Single	"Haste Haste Morbo"			Monir Khan
Single	"Boshonto Batashe"			
Single	"Phuler Jemon Modhu Thake"			
Single	"Ekta Second Onek Somoy"			S I Tutul

== Social activity ==
Kanak Chapa is involved with social organizations named "Potho Shishuder Chayatol", "Amra Khati Gorib" and "Matrisodon". She has been running an online school named "Amader Khelaghor School" for about eight years.

== Awards ==
Bangladesh National Film Awards

Year	Award	Category	Film	Result
1995	National Film Awards	Best Female Playback Singer	Love Story	Won
2001	National Film Awards	Best Female Playback Singer	Premer Taj Mahal	Won
2008	National Film Awards	Best Female Playback Singer	Ek Takar Bou	Won

Meril Prothom Alo Awards

Year	Award	Category	Result
1999	Meril Prothom Alo Awards	Best Singer (Female)	Won
2000	Meril Prothom Alo Awards	Best Singer (Female)	Won
2001	Meril Prothom Alo Awards	Best Singer (Female)	Won
2002	Meril Prothom Alo Awards	Best Singer (Female)	Won

Bachsas Awards

Year	Award	Category	Result
1999	Bachsas Awards	Best Singer (Female)	Won
2000	Bachsas Awards	Best Singer (Female)	Won
2001	Bachsas Awards	Best Singer (Female)	Won
2008	Bachsas Awards	Best Singer (Female)	Won

Ifad Film Club Award

Year	Award	Category	Result
2012	Ifad Film Club Award	Best Singer (Female)	Won

11th Channel i Music Awards

- Best Modern Song – won
