= Andrew Kishore =

Bangladeshi playback singer (1955–2020)

- এন্ড্রু কিশোর
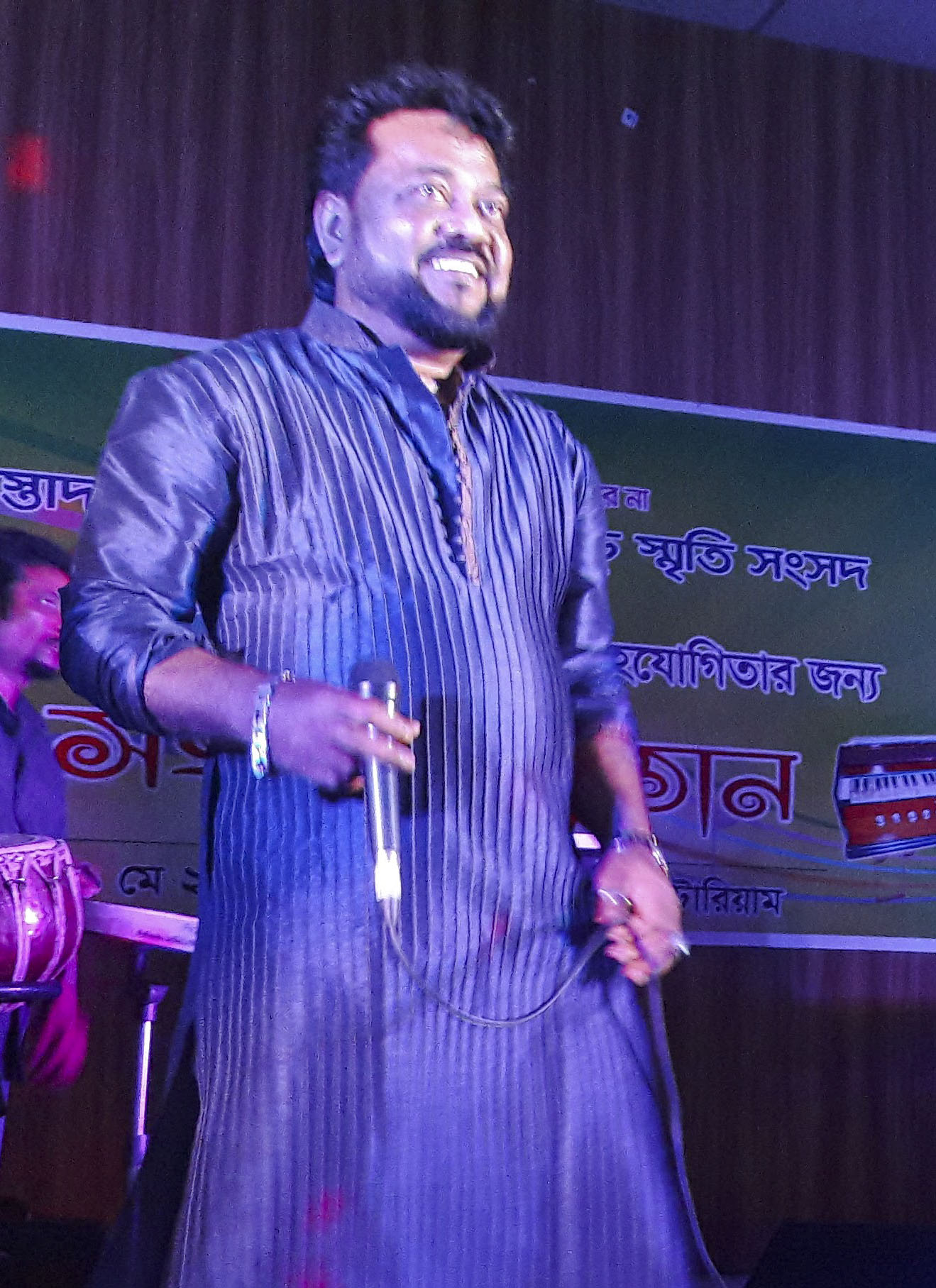
- Andrew Kishore performing live at Rajshahi College in May 2018
- Born: Andrew Kishore Kumar Baroi; 4 November 1955; Rajshahi, East Pakistan
- Died: 6 July 2020 (aged 64); Rajshahi, Bangladesh
- Resting place: Buried in Christian Cemetery of the Church of Bangladesh, Srirampur, Rajshahi, Bangladesh
- Education: MComm (Management)
- Alma mater: Rajshahi Government City College, University of Rajshahi
- Occupation: Playback singer
- Spouse: Lipika Andrew Eti (m. 1988)
- Children: 2
- Musical career
- Origin: Dhaka, Bangladesh
- Genres: Folk, Film, Pop
- Years active: 1980–2020
- Labels: Sangeeta; Anupam Recording Media; Soundtek; Chenasur; Protune
- Website: Official website (Archived)

Andrew Kishore Kumar Baroi (4 November 1955 – 6 July 2020), widely known as Andrew Kishore, was a Bangladeshi playback singer. Often referred to as the "Playback King" of Bangladesh for his extensive contributions to the classic era of Dhalywood cinema, he was the lead playback singer for more than 100 films and recorded over 15,000 songs.

Kishore made his playback debut in the film Mail Train (1977) with the song "Ochinpurer Rajkumari Nei Je Tar Keu". He achieved his career breakthrough shortly after with the critically acclaimed track "Ek Chor Jay Chole" from Protigga (1979). He is widely remembered for his iconic tracks, including "Jiboner Golpo, Achhe Baki Olpo", "Amar Buker Moddhe Khane", "Daak Diyachhen Doyal Amare", "Amar Shara Deho Kheyo Go Mati", and "Shobai To Bhalobasha Chae". Later in his career, he served as a judge on the reality television show Bangladeshi Idol.

One of the most decorated artists in the industry, Kishore won the Bangladesh National Film Award for Best Male Playback Singer a record eight times. He also received numerous other accolades throughout his career, including five Bachsas Awards and three Meril-Prothom Alo Awards.

== Early life and career ==
At the age of six, Andrew Kishore started acquiring formal singing training from Ustad Abdul Aziz Bachchu, the then chief music director of Rajshahi Betar. He was a student of Ustad Abdul Aziz Bachchu's 'Surbani Music School' in Rajshahi. In 1962, he was listed on Rajshahi Betar as a child artist. And then the famous lyricist Mohammad Rafiquzzaman used to watch the children's section as the producer of Rajshahi Betar.

Kishore has contributed to the national movement in his early life. During the 1969 Mass uprising in East Pakistan, he and other contemporary artists used to visit different places of Rajshahi city and sing protest songs. During the Bangladesh Liberation War, Kishore took refuge in India with his family. He used to inspire the freedom fighters by singing in the refugee camps. After the war ended, he was enlisted in the radio in Nazrul, Tagore, modern, folk and patriotic song categories.

In academic life, Andrew Kishore did a Bachelor of Commerce from Rajshahi Government City College & Master of Commerce in Management from University of Rajshahi in 1977.

Of course, my parents have inspired me since my childhood. They are my idols. My mother never blamed others for anything, rather she always tried to cope with the difficult situations with dignity and poise, and my father's caring, steadfast and disciplined lifestyle has always inspired me to perfect my craft, even at this point of my life. I have also been inspired by the late great Ustad Abdul Aziz Bachchu. He was always a very talented and skilled artist, who was never afraid to let his voice be heard, even in times of crisis, to show his support of the arts. He was also a great teacher, and had incredible eye for identifying not only the hidden talent a student possessed, but how that potential could be tapped into. Last, but certainly not least, I have always been inspired by the great music director, Alam Khan. He has been a great teacher and a great friend all these years, and even after all these years of working with him, I am still in awe of his genius.

— Andrew Kishore to The Daily Star — sharing his inspiration in singing

After completing his studies, he concentrated on business by owning a grocery store in Rajshahi. However, in 1977, he moved to the house of his childhood friend living in Dhaka. In the same year, he participated in a talent hunt project initiated by Shahidul Islam, the then director of the Transcription Service of Bangladesh Betar. On the programme, he rendered the song "Soheli O Soheli", composed by Debu Bhattacherjee, and he was able to catch the attention of well known music directors.

Kishore debuted in playback singing in the film Mail Train (1977) where he sang "Ochinpurer Rajkumari Nei Je Tar Keu", composed by Alam Khan. Introduced by A.H.M. Rafique, Kishore made his breakthrough with the song "Ek Chor Jay Choley" from the film Protikkha, composed by Alam Khan.

In 1987, Kishore established an advertising agency called Probaho Media, for TV dramas, commercials and other productions. Later in memory of his late teacher, in 2011, he also established a cultural organisation "Ustad Abdul Aziz Bachchu Sriti Shongshod" in Rajshahi.

Andrew Kishore had dominated the Bangla film industry over the last 40 to 42 years. He also earned acclaim for Hindi and Urdu playbacks. He is the only Bangladeshi artist to sing to the tune of R. D. Burman in an Indo-Bangladeshi venture film, Shatru (1986).

== TV and stage appearance ==
Andrew Kishore sang on Bangladesh Television in the pre-1985 years of his career. But for more than a decade, he played behind the scenes in numerous Bengali film playbacks, but did not appear on the TV screen. After a long 15 years, this talented artist came back to the TV screen in 1999 with the song "Poddo Patar Pani". (Note: The source indicates that in the 15 years prior to the release of this song, Andrew Kishore did not appear on television. The song "Poddo Patar Pani" was released in 1999, which indicates that 15 years before 1999, in 1984, he last appeared on TV.) Since then, he has been a regular artist at Ityadi aired on Bangladesh Television.

He has also been a judge on a music reality show. He was a regular judge of Bangladeshi Idol, a reality television song contest aired on SA TV in 2013.

In addition, he has been seen singing or giving interviews at various times on various channels whose videos exist on YouTube. In the Wind of Change (Bangladeshi TV program) aired on Gaan Bangla music channel, Kishore sang his famous "Haire Manush Rongin Fanush" and "Beder Meye Josna Amay Kotha Diyeche" in a re-composition by music director Kaushik Hossain Taposh, which was once again widely acclaimed by the new generation of listeners.

He has also done numerous concerts at different times in the country and abroad. Andrew Kishore's last musical TV show was "Koto Rongo Jano Re Manush" aired on Channel i.

== Personal life ==
Andrew Kishore was born on November 4, 1955, in Rajshahi, Bangladesh. His parents are Khitish Chandra Baroi (1919-1993) and Minu Baroi (d. 2006). Andrew's father was from Kotalipara Upazila and worked in Rajshahi. He was involved in the medical profession in Rajshahi, where Andrew was born and raised. Andrew's mother, Minu Baroi, was a teacher at Bolanpur Mission Girl's High School, Rajshahi and was a music devoted person. Her favorite singer was Kishore Kumar. That is why Andrew was named Andrew Kishore Kumar Baroi. He started his first lesson in music with Ustad Abdul Aziz Bachchu of Rajshahi at the behest of his mother. Since a young age, Kishore had a passion for media, which led him to stardom eventually.

"The name in my certificates was not Andrew Kishore. There was Andrew Kishore Kumar Baroi. One day director Dewan Nazrul told me that my name is very big. According to him commercially my full name had no value! He also said that most of the stars of the world have used two words because their names are big. Such as Elvis Presley, Lata Mungeshkar, Uttam Kumar, Mohammad Rafi, Kishore Kumar all have two words in their names. So the director suggested using two-word names. Then I decided to shorten my name as Andrew Kishore."

— Andrew Kishore

Kishore married Lipika Andrew (Eti) in 1988. (Note: The sources indicate that Andrew went for song recording at "Don Studio" at the call of director "Ali Hosen" on the day of his marriage. In the movie "Byathar Daan", Andrew Kishore sang to the tune of "Ali Hosen". That movie got censorship certificate on 17 January 1989 and released that year. In other words, it can be easily assumed that the cinematography of that film was going on in 1988 & Andrew also got married that year.) They had two children. His sons name is Jay Andrew Saptok and his daughters name is Minim Andrew Songa. Songa got married in 2017. Kishore has two siblings. He was the youngest among them.

== Death ==
Kishore was diagnosed with diffuse large B-cell lymphoma on 9 September 2019. He also had kidney- and hormone-related diseases. His chemotherapy treatment started under Lim Soon Thye at the Singapore General Hospital. He returned to Bangladesh on 11 June 2020. He had been shifted to the intensive care unit of a clinic adjacent to his sister's house and run by his sister after his physical condition had significantly deteriorated. He died on 6 July. Andrew's brother-in-law, Patrick Bipul Biswas, and nephew, Ian Richie Paulson, confirmed the news to the press. His coffin was later brought from City Church to the Christian Cemetery of the Church of Bangladesh in Srirampur area of Rajshahi city on 15 July 2020 at 11am. He was buried at 11:30 am. He was buried in front of the cemetery. This cemetery contains the graves of his parents.

== List of background music in the movie ==
=== List of some of his popular Bengali songs ===
Years	Movie	Song	Note
1977	Mail train	Ochinpurer Rajkumari Nei Je Tar Keu	The first backstage
1980	Emiler Goyenda Bahini	Dhum dharakka	
1982	Boro Bhalo Lok Chilo	Hayre Manush Rangin Phanush	Winner: National Film Award Best Male Singer
1983	Nazma	Chokhe Chokhe Raag; Fuler Basor Ghor	
1984	Obhijaan		
1984	Princess Tina Khan		Winner: Bachsas Awards Best Male Vocalist
1985	Maa O Chele		
1986	Shatru		
1987	Surrender	Sobai To Bhalobasha Chay; Goon Bhag Korey Korey; Ghori Chole Tik Tik	Winner: National Film Award Best Male Vocalist
1987	Lalu Mastan	Shunno Ei Haate Har Rekhe	
1987	Dayi Ke?	Eto Sukh Soibo Ki Kore? Tumi Chiley Meghe Dhaka Chand; O Premer Masterji	
1987	Sohojatri	Prithibir Joto Sukh Ami Tomar Chowate Khuje Peyechi	
1987	Shami Stri		Winner: Bachsas Awards Best Male Vocalist
1987	Harano Sur		
1988	Dui Jibon	Ami Ekdin Tomay Na Dekhle; Tumi Aaj Kotha Diyecho	
1988	Jogajog		
1988	Agomon		
1988	Bir Purush		
1989	Beder Meye Josna	Beder Meye Josna Amay Kotha Diyeche	
1989	Byathar Daan		
1989	Khotipuron	Ami Poth Choli Eka; Ei Duti Chotto Haatey	Winner: National Film Award Best Male Vocalist
1989	Bhaijaan	Ami Je Tor Priyotoma	
1989	Obujh Hridoy	Tumi Amar Jibon, Ami Tomar Jibon	
1989	Ranga Bhabi		
1989	Shotto Mittha		
1989	Bojromushthi		
1990	Dolna	Tumi Amar Koto Chena; Bobar Shatru Nei	
1990	Moroner Porey	Prithibi Toh Dudineri Basha	
1991	Padma Meghna Jamuna	Dukkho Bina Hoy Na Sadhona	Winner: National Film Award Best Male Vocalist
1991	Pita Mata Sontan	Tumi Aro Kache Ashiya	
1991	Ochena	Ami Jabo Na America; Ami Driver Bhalo	
1991	Shantona	Jibon Jeno Shuru Holo Abar	
1992	Danga	Shudhu Tumi Shudhu Tumi	
1992	Shonkhonil Karagar		
1992	Ondho Bissash	Takar Ei Duniyay	
1993	Obujh Sontan		
1994	Ontore Ontore	Ekhane Dujone Nirojone; Bhalobashiya Gelam Fasiya	
1994	Sujan Sakhi	Sob Sokhire Paar Korite	
1994	Ghrina	Kedona Byatha Pele; Tup Tup Brishti Jhorche	
1994	Commander	Bajlo Sanai Bajlo Biye Barite Ruposhi Banglar Ek Ruposhi Meye	
1994	Prem Juddho		
1994	Don		
1995	Babar Aadesh		
1995	Denmohor	Ami Tomar Preme Pagol	
1995	Kanyadan		
1995	Anjuman		
1995	Moha Milon		
1995	Shopner Thikana	O Sathire Jeyona Kokhono Durey	
1995	Aasha Bhalobasha		
1996	Ei Ghar Ei Sangsar	Amader Choto Jodi Choley	
1996	Mayer Odhikar	Tumi Ekta Chor Ami Ekta Chor Pipra Khabe Boroloker Dhon	
1996	Priyojon	O Sathire Tumi Chara Valo Lage Na E Jibone Jare Cheyechi	
1996	Sneher Protidan	Ami Je Ek Ganer Pakhi	
1996	Tomake Chai	Tomake Chai; Amar Bhitor Bahire Ontore Ontore	
1996	Jibon Songsar		
1996	Kobul	Esho Ekbar Dujoney Abar; Tumi Acho Hridoyer Aanginay	Winner: National Film Award Best Male Vocalist
1996	Hridoyer Ayna	Tumi Chander Jochona Nou Keno Akhi Chhol Chhol	
1996	Sotyer Mrityu Nei	Hridoyer Kache Theko	
1996	Durjoy		
1996	Bashira		
1997	Ananda Osru	Tumi Mor Joiboner Bhabona	
1997	Prem Piyashi		
1997	Shesh Thikana	Asha Amar Bhalobasha Ami Pathore Ful Photabo	
1997	Shopner Nayok	Ekta Mon Chai	
1997	Coolie	Akashete Lokkho Tara Chand Kintu Ekta Re	
1998	Vondo	O Sathire Amar Jibon Shudhu Tumi	
1998	Moner Moto Mon		
1999	Ke Amar Baba		
1999	Ononto Valobasha	Eije Duniyate Koto Manush Aashe Tomar Oi Mishti Hashi	
1999	Lathi		
2000	Aaj Gaye Holud	Chokh Je Moner Kotha Bole	Winner: National Film Award Best Male Vocalist
2000	Jhor		
2000	Gunda Number One		
2000	Biyer Phool	Tomay Dekhle Mone Hoy Oi Chand Mukhe Jeno	
2001	Sasurbari Zindabad	Sasurbari Zindabad	
2001	Sopner Basor	Kichu Kichu Manusher Jibone	
2001	Rongbaz Badshah		
2001	Premer Taj Mahal	O Piya Piyare	Winner: Bachsas Awards Best Male Vocalist
2002	Major Saheb		
2002	Mastaner Upor Mastan		
2002	Oder Dhor		
2003	Chandrakatha		
2005	Hajar Bochor Dhorey		
2006	Hridoyer Kotha		
2006	Pitar Ashon	Praner Cheye Priyo Tumi Bondhu Amar	
2006	Bidrohi Padma		
2007	Amar Praner Shami		
2007	Daktar Bari		
2007	Bouyer Jala		
2007	Saajghor		Winner: National Film Award Best Male Vocalist
2007	Maidan		
2007	Shatru Shatru Khela		
2007	Ami bachte Chai		
2008	Ek Takar Bou	O little friend	
2008	Ki Jadu Korila	Ki Jadu Korila	Winner: National Film Award Best Male Vocalist
2008	Valobashar Dushmon		
2008	Tip Tip Brishti		
2008	Mayer Shopno		
2008	Jodi Bou Sajo Go	Jodi Bou Sajo Go Buke Jorabo Tomay	
2008	Shami Niye Juddho		
2008	Bodhu Boron		
2008	Somadhi		
2008	Mone Prane Acho Tumi	Ek Bindu Valobasha Dao	Winner: Bachsas Awards Best Male Vocalist
2008	Tumi Amar Prem		
2008	Amara Jan Amar Pran	Ami je number one Icche Kore Valobashi Shoto Bochor Aage Tomari Chilam	
2008	Baba Amar Baba		
2008	Tumi Shopno Tumi Sadhona		
2008	Tomakei Khujchi		
2008	Rajdhanir Raja		
2009	Shami Strir Wada		
2009	Amar Praner Priya	Tumi Amar Praner Priya	
2009	Mon Diyechi Tomake		
2009	Prem Koyedi		
2009	Sobai Toh Valobasha Chay		
2009	Mayer Haate Beheshter Chabi	Sobaire Sob Daan Koriya Amare Maa Korlo Daan	
2009	Kajer Manush	Ami Kaher Manush Vai	
2009	Ebadot		
2009	Tumi Amar Shami		
2009	Mon Boshe Na Porar Table E	Akash Kandile Brishti Pore	
2009	O Sathi Re		
2009	Biye Bari		
2009	Tumi Ki Sei		
2009	Jonmo Tomar Jonno		
2010	Amar Shopno Amar Songsar		
2010	Bajao Biyer Bajna		
2010	Top Hero		
2010	Golapi ekhon bilate	Keno Loke Valobasha Chay	Winner: Bachsas Awards Best Male Vocalist
2010	Ek Joban		
2010	Valobashlei Ghor Badha Jay Na	Jodi Proshno Koro Ki Ache Amar	
2010	Mayer Chokh		
2010	Hay Prem Hay Valobasha		
2010	Jomidar		
2010	Premik Purush		
2011	Matir Thikana		
2011	Ostro Charo Klom Dhoro		
2011	Amar Prithibi Tumi		
2011	Garments Konya		
2011	Wanted		
2012	Se Amar Mon Kereche		
2012	Shami Bhagya		
2013	Eki Britte		
2013	Judge Barrister Police Commissioner		
2013	Attoghatok		
2013	Premik Number One		
2014	Shabnam		
2014	Shimarekha		
2014	Harijan		
2014	Kothin Protishodh	Baba Je Amar	
2014	Sera Nayok		
2015	Putro Ekhon Poysawala		
2015	I love you Priya		
2015	Valobasha Shimahin		
2015	Commissioner		
2015	Lalchar		
2015	Ekattorer Maa Jononi	Ekti Shadhin Desh	
2015	Hridoy Dolano Prem		
2016	Raja 420		
2016	Valobashapur	Tomar Odhore, Tomar Aangina Te	
2016	Sonar Kathi		

=== List of songs in other languages ===
Years	Movie	Song	Language	Co-artist	Lyricist	Music Director
1986	Shatru	"Sooraj Chandaa Saagar Parbat"; "Main Tera Bismil Hoon"	Hindi	Solo Music	Majrooh Sultanpuri; Anand Bakshi	R.D. Burman

== Single tracks ==
Year	Song	Lyricist	Music director	Note
2007	Shohid Minar Vorey Geche Phoole Phoole	Mohammad Moniruzzaman	Samar Das	Ekusher Gaan
2012	Polasher Dine Polash Hoye Ghore Firechilo	Mohammad Rafiquzzaman	Farid Ahmed	Ekusher Gaan
2020	Ar Konodin Ei Shohore	Prosenjit Ojha	Ali Akbar Rupu	Lyrical Video
2018	Achole Bandhiya Rakhio	Nur Hossin Redoy	Firoze Plabon	Music Video
2019	Bhubon Majhi	Prosenjit Ojha	Nurul Haque	Lyrical Video
2018	Bangladesh	Monjurur Rahman	Alauddin Ali	Patriotic Song
1999	Poddo Patar Pani Noy	Mohammad Rafiquzzaman	Ali Akbar Rupu	Ityadi
2002	Aaj Phooler Moto Futuk Sobar Mon	N/A		Ityadi
2003	Mather Sobuj Theke Surjer Lal	N/A		Ityadi
2005	Manusheri Ache Monushotto	Kabir Bakul	Ali Akbar Rupu & Rajesh	Ityadi
2006	Shadhinota	Gazi Mazharul Anwar	Ali Akbar Rupu	Ityadi
2006	Aaj Shodesher Priyo Dhulikona	Mohammad Rafiquzzaman	Ali Akbar Rupu	Ityadi
2007	Ei Desh Amader Pran Prachurje Bhora	Mohammad Rafiquzzaman	Ali Akbar Rupu	Ityadi
2007	Ek Gayer Ek Krishan Bodhu	Mohammad Rafiquzzaman	Ali Akbar Rupu	Ityadi
2009	Manushe Manushe Mohamiloner Moha Anondo Dine	Mohammad Rafiquzzaman	Ali Akbar Rupu	Ityadi
2010	Hajar Bochor Dhorey Gora Til Til Kore	Mohammad Rafiquzzaman	Ali Akbar Rupu	Ityadi
2010	Bangladesher Protidin Hobe Surjo Joyer Din	Mohammad Rafiquzzaman	Ali Akbar Rupu	Ityadi
2011	Jiboner Joyogane Jabo, Agamir Ahobane Jago	Mohammad Rafiquzzaman	Ali Akbar Rupu	Ityadi
2013	Ei Din Hashi Anonde Rongin	Mohammad Rafiquzzaman	Ali Akbar Rupu	Ityadi
2015	Ronge Ronge Rangano, Akash Nil E Tangano	Mohammad Rafiquzzaman	Ali Akbar Rupu	Ityadi
2016	Ami Akashe Likhechi Surjodoyer Gan	Mohammad Rafiquzzaman	Ali Akbar Rupu	Ityadi
2016	Amader Bhalobasha Amader Desh	Mohammad Rafiquzzaman	Ali Akbar Rupu	Ityadi
2017	Ei Khushir Dine Sobai Sobar Hobo Apon	Mohammad Rafiquzzaman	Ali Akbar Rupu	Ityadi
2018	Bachte Jodi Hoy Tobe Toh Bachateo Hobe	Mohammad Rafiquzzaman	Farid Ahmed	Ityadi
2019	Bollo Akash E Desh Ta Ke Bhalobashi	Mohammad Rafiquzzaman	Suman Kalyan	Ityadi

== Filmography ==
- Mail Train (1977)
- Protigga (1979)
- Emiler Goenda Bahini (1980)
- Ronger Manush (1982)
- Ustad Sagred (1984)
- Kanchonmala (1985)
- Noyon'er Alo (1985)
- Shatru / Birodh (1986)
- Tin Konna (1986)
- Dui Poysar Alta (1986)
- Nondini (1987)
- Neetiban (1987)
- Jibon Porikkha (1988)
- Jhinuk Mala (1988)
- Beder Meye Josna (1989)
- Mehman (1989)
- Surrender
- Baba Keno Chakar (1990)
- Chondrokotha (1990)
- Fire Fire Asi (1991)
- Bheja Chokh (1991)
- Premer Nam Bedona (1992)
- Rohim Rupban (1992)
- Keyamat Theke Keyamat (1993)
- Tomake Chai (1994)
- Sajan (1994)
- Bikkhobh (1994)
- Chawa Theke Pawa (1994)
- Sojon (1994)
- Banglar Nayok (1995)
- Moha Milon (1995)
- Sontrash (1994)
- Sotter Mrittu Nei (1995)
- Anondo Oshru (1995)
- Sopner Prithibi (1995)
- Sopner Thikana (1995)
- Priyojon (1996)
- Sujon Sokhi (1996)
- Praner Cheye Priyo (1997)
- Biyer Phul (1997)
- Shesh Thikana (1997)
- Tumi Amar (1997)
- Tumi Shudhu Tumi (1997)
- Bhalobasi Tomake (1998)
- Prithibi Tomar Amar (1998)
- Meyerao Manush (1998)
- Modhur Milon (1999)
- Bhondo (1999)
- Madam Fuli (1999)
- Tomar Jonno Pagol (1999)
- Aj Gaye Holud (2000)
- Asha Amar Asha (2000)
- Shesh Thikana (2000)
- Narir Mon (2000)
- E Badhon Jabena Chhire (2000)
- Nissase Tumi Bissase Tumi (2000)
- Buk Chera Bhalobasa (2000)
- Sami Chhintai (2000)
- O Priya Tumi Kothay (2001)
- Meghla Akash (2001)
- Milon Hobe Koto Dine (2001)
- Hridoyer Badhon (2001)
- Itihas (2001)
- Premer Tajmahal (2002)
- Matir Phul (2003)
- Phul Nebo Na Oshru Nebo (2003)
- Sopner Basor (2004)
- Sopner Bhalobasa (2004)
- Moyna Sundori (2004)
- Khairun Sundori (2004)
- Wrong Number (2004)
- Megher Opare Megh (2004)
- Bolona Bhalobasi (2004)
- Prem Songeet (2005)
- Taka (2005)
- Noyon Bhora Jol (2005)
- Bini Sutar Mala (2005)
- Dhakaiya Pola Borishaler Maiya (2005)
- Hajar Bochhor Dhore (2005)
- Molla Barir Bou (2005)
- Meher Nigar (2005)
- Dui Noyoner Alo (2005)
- Hridoyer Kotha (2006)
- Koti Takar Kabin (2006)
- Mayer Morjada (2006)
- Kheyaghater Majhi (2006)
- Mayer Hate Behester Chabi (2006)
- Amar Praner Sami (2007)
- Ek Takar Bou (2007)
- Chhoto Ekta Bhalobasa (2007)
- Sami Strir Wada (2008)
- Amar Praner Priya (2008)
- Tomake Bou Banabo (2008)
- Chachchu (2008)
- Dadima (2008)
- Meye Sakkhi (2008)
- Bolbo Kotha Basor Ghore (2009)
- Shubho Bibaho (2009)
- Mon Bosena Porar Tebile (2009)
- Chader Moto Bou (2010)
- Bodhu Tumi Kar (2010)
- Ora Amay Bhalo Hote Dilona (2010)
- Bhalobaslei Ghor Badha Jay Na (2011)
- Pran Sojoni
- Ekbar Bolo Bhalobasi (2011)
- Mayer Hate Behester Chabi (2011)
- Priya Amar Jan (2011)
- Piritir Agun Jole Digun (2011)
- Moner Ghore Bosot Kore (2012)
- Ek Takar Kabin (2012)
- Nishpap Munna (2013)
- Number One Shakib Khan (2013)

== Discography ==
S/N	Album(s) Name	Language	Format	Label	No.of Tracks	Track Name(s)	Genre	Co-artist(s)	Lyricist(s)	Composer(s)
1	"Bhalo Achi"	Bengali	Audio CD	Sangeeta Music	12	1. Asha Dila; 2. Kalo Meye; 3. Bhalo Achi; 4. Shohor Chere Cholechi; 5. Naam Niya; 6. Oi Durey; 7. Keno Bhalobashlam; 8. Obhishap Debona; 9. Kotodin Dekhinare; 10. Ekla Jibon; 11. Koto Sadhonay; 12. Akhir Koney	Folk, Classical	Solo (music)	Alam Khan	Alam Khan
2	"Phire Phire Ashi"	Bengali	Audio CD	Soundtek	11	1. Amar Sara Deho; 2. Dak Diyachen; 3. Amar Babar; 4. Jiboner Golpo; 5. Amar Buker; 6. Ami Chirokal; 7. Ogo Bideshini; 8. Hayre Manush; 9. Sobai Toh; 10. Bhengeche Pinjor; 11. Kare Dekhabo	Film	Solo (music)	Gazi Mazharul Anwar; Syed Shamsul Haque; Radharaman Dutta; Moniruzzaman Monir; Ahmed Imtiaz Bulbul	Alam Khan; Sheikh Sadi Khan; Radharaman Dutta; Alauddin Ali; Ahmed Imtiaz Bulbul
3	"Mon Bondhua"	Bengali	Audio CD	Sangeeta Music	10	1. Konna Tomar Hashi; 2. Bindia-3; 3. Mon Bondhua; 4. Sob Kichu Fele (Khairun); 5. Charidike Chatai Bera; 6. KA-te Kishore; 7. Nandini; 8. Manush Kohilo; 9. Purbo Theke Poshchime; 10. Hawa	Folk	Solo (music)	Delowar Arjuda Sharaf; Kabir Bakul; Shah Alam Sarker; Rajib Ahmed; Gazi Mazharul Anwar; Nasir Uddin Khan; Munshi Wadud	Emon Saha; Alauddin Ali
4	"Kal Joyee Gaan"	Bengali	Audio CD	Anupam Recording Media	11	1. Priya Amar Priya; 2. Amar Buker Moddhekhane; 3. Chader Sathe Ami Debona; 4. Ki Diya Mon Karila; 5. Tumi Chander Jochona Nou; 6. Sobai Toh Bhalobasha Chay; 7. Buke Ache Mon; 8. Beder Meye Josna; 9. Akashete Lokkho Tara; 10. Tumi Amar Moner Majhi; 11. Aaj Sara Raat	Film	Runa Laila; Sabina Yasmin; Samina Chowdhury	Moniruzzaman Monir; Ahmed Imtiaz Bulbul; Syed Shamsul Haque; Gazi Mazharul Anwar; Tozammel Huq Bakul; Milton Khondokar; Alamgir Kabir	Alam Khan; Ahmed Imtiaz Bulbul; Abu Taher; Anwar Jahan Nantu; Rumu Khan
5	"Gayen"	Bengali	Cassette tape & Audio CD	Sangeeta Music	12	1. Shokher Tola Ashi Taka; 2. Bondhu Kemon Acho Ki Khobor; 3. Eka Keu Sukhi Hoy Na; 4. Maa-Jaan; 5. Bhalobasha Mane Porajoy; 6. Fokfoka Josna; 7. Tomra Amake Gaite; 8. Moner Maya Boro maya 9. E Jibon Natok Toh Noy; 10. Songsar Ki Maya; 11. Ghurnijhor Aar Jolocchash; 12. Moron Tomar Choron Dhori	Folk	Solo (music)	Prince Mahmud	Prince Mahmud
6	"Jiboner Golpo"	Bengali	Audio CD	Sangeeta Music	12	1. Sukhe Thakle Bhoote Kilay; 2. Moyna; 3. Moner E Pinjiray; 4. Maati Diye Deho Gora; 5. Ki Dosh Chilo; 6. Jonmer Aage Baba; 7. Bujhinai Bujhinai Re Bondhu; 8. Bhalobashar Sukh Dukkho; 9. Amar Dukkho Dekhe; 10. Amar Deho Tori; 11. Amar Chawa Tomake; 12. Agun Dekhe Korina Bhoy	Folk	Solo (music)	N/A	
7	"Prem Noy Cholona" from music compilations named: Bangla Folk Hitz Vol. 2; Bangla Folk Hitz Vol. 21	Bengali	Audio CD & Streaming media	Chenasur	10	1. Ei Jomanay Anarkoli; 2. Lep Selano Shui; 3. Mukta Dati Horini Chokh; 4. Na Khaitam Re Beter Bari; 5. Prem Bicchede Pran Jole; 6. Porecho Benaroshi; 7. Bhabteo Parini; 8. Amake Kadabar Jonne; 9. Shamir Ghore Sukh; 10. Jibon Gari Thamiye Dao	Folk	Solo (music)	N/A	
8	"College Er Chatri" from music compilations named: Bangla Folk Hitz Vol. 6; Bangla Folk Hitz Vol. 21	Bengali	Audio CD & Streaming media	Chenasur	10	1. Amar Bohudin Furailo Re; 2. Amar Bhanga Ghore; 3. Amar Ghorero Dorjay; 4. Ami Jhap Diye Tor Prem Nodite; 5. Jar Sathe Jar Bhab Hoy; 6. Pirit Joton Pirit Roton; 7. Tumi Je College Er Notun Chatri; 8. Sweet Tomar Chehara; 9. Tomar Preme Hashi Mukhe; 10. Pirit Sikhaiya Bhabete Mojaiya	Folk	Solo (music)	N/A	
9	"Priyo Bondhu" from music compilations named: Bangla Folk Hitz Vol. 2; Bangla Folk Hitz Vol. 7; Bangla Folk Hitz Vol. 21	Bengali	Audio CD & Streaming media	Chenasur	10	1. Prithibi Tomar Amar; 2. Ami Hoilam Gadha; 3. Rasta Ghate Koto Meye; 4. Churi Hoiho Hate; 5. Akasher Oi Chandtake; 6. Behester Bagan; 7. SOnar Batay Pan; 8. Ei Jibone Jodi; 9. Bhalobeshe Chilam Jare; 10. Koborer Mati	Folk	Solo (music)	N/A	
10	"Priyo Shotru" from music compilations named: Bangla Folk Hitz Vol. 7; Bangla Folk Hitz Vol. 21	Bengali	Audio CD & Streaming media	Chenasur	10	1. Bolechile Prithibita Bodley; 2. Koybar Hoy Re Biya; 3. Phone Korte Koy Taka Lage; 4. Bhalobasha Shudhu Kaday; 5. Hoyto Tomar Gaye Legeche; 6. O Sathire Eto Asha Diya; 7. Prem Koriya Sikhi Hoise; 8. Priyotoma Ektibar Eshe; 9. Benaroshi Ghomta Khule; 10. E Jibone Priyake Na Pai	Folk	Solo (music)	N/A	
11	"Modhur Bhalobasha" & "Shajiey Debo Bhalobasha"	Bengali	Streaming media	Doyel Products	10	1. Mojnu Bhai; 2. Ami Chaina Bari Gari; 3. Norom Hater Gorom Pitha; 4. Joler Pori; 5. Prem Agune Joley; 6. Tumi Nai Bole; 7. Tumi Prothom; 8. Shagor Sheche Manik; 9. Laili Kothay Pai; 10. Manush Khuner Mamla	Folk, Pop	Solo (music)	Bakiul Alam	Jan E Alam
12	"Dukkho Amar Chiro Sathi"	Bengali	Audio CD	Sangeeta Music	10	1. Tomar Moner; 2. Joto Khushi Byatha Dao; 3. Aj Sokale; 4. Prithibi Ghumiye Geche; 5. Dukkho Amar Chiro sathi 6. Koto Joog Par Holo; 7. Raat Barlei; 8. Rimjhim; 9. Chokh Duto Ondho; 10. Mousumi	Folk, Pop	Solo (music)	Kamruzzaman Kajol; Liaquat Ali Biswas; Bakiul Alom	Pranab Ghosh; Najir Mahmud; Debendra Chattopadhyay
13	"Valobashar Jonmodin"	Bengali	Audio CD	Sangeeta Music	10	1. Valobashar Jonmodin; 2. Ovimani Chole Jeona; 3. Tore Ami Valobashi; 4. Ful Tumi Chad Tumi; 5. Mitthe Ovijog; 6. Moyna Amar; 7. Pagol Pagol; 8. Ek Poloke Ektu Dekha; 9. Ekta Manush Jodi; 10. Shurutai Chilo Boro Vul	Folk, Pop	Solo (music)	Delowar Arjuda Sharaf; Mithu Hasan	Mannan Mohammad
14	"Kon Baganer Ful"	Bengali	Audio CD	Sangeeta Music	10	1. Radha Premer; 2. Kon Baganer Ful; 3. Mayer Majare; 4. Hawa O Hawa; 5. Uttore Na Jaiyo; 6. Buker Vitor; 7. Chander Shampan; 8. Bahire Sada; 9. Din Ache Raat Ache; 10. Jibonke Bolchi	Folk, Pop	Solo (music)	Ahmed Imtiaz Bulbul	Ahmed Imtiaz Bulbul
15	"Bhalobeshe Oporadhi"	Bengali	Cassette tape & Audio CD	Sangeeta Music	12	1. Bhalobasha; 2. Ore Manush; 3. Chander Sathe; 4. Ek Ghorer Karone; 5. O Beli; 6. Sa-Re-Ga-Ma; 7. Pata Bahar; 8. 8Tui Boro Sharthopor; 9. Eto Shundor Prithibi Chere; 10. Moner Janalara; 11. Kotha Theke; 12. Dui Duyare Tumi	Folk, Pop	Solo (music)	N/A	
16	"Bhul Sabi Bhul"	Bengali	Cassette tape & Audio CD	Sangeeta Music	12	1. Bhul Sobi Bhul; 2. Jar Karone Kandere Mon; 3. Shonogo Chad Shono Tara; 4. Kere Nao Duchokher Drishti; 5. Bhul Bujhe Tomake Koshto Diyechi; 6. Shopner Duare Acho Dariye; 7. Tanpuratar Moto; 8. Praner Bashinda; 9. Prithibir Shob Alo; 10. Bhalobasha More Geche; 11. Shei Rakhalia; 12. Charidike Matir Deyal	Folk, Pop	Solo (music)	N/A	
17	"Abar Firey Elam"	Bengali	Audio CD	Soundtek	12	1. Chokher Jole Ami; 2. Valobashe Gelam Sudhu; 3. Chinli Nare Chinli Na; 4. Jhare Dekhe Jhare; 5. Koto Rong Jano; 6. Kare Bole Valobasha; 7. Ek Chor Jay Chole; 8. Chul Pakile; 9. Sobare Ami Korlam; 10. Kalu Mithra; 11. Kath Purle Koila Hoy; 12. Ai Achi Ai Nai	Folk, Pop, Film	Solo (music)	Mukul Chowdhury ^{(Song - "Ek Chor Jay Choley")}	Rocket Mondol; (Track no.-7, "Ek Chor Jay Choley" was originally composed by Alam Khan, later it was re-composed in this album by Rocket Mondol.)
18	"Golper Shuruta Shundor"	Bengali	Audio CD	Sangeeta Music	10	1. Golper Shuruta Chilo Shundor; 2. Amar Chawa Tomake; 3. Ful Tumi Chad Tumi; 4. Shono Go Chad Shono Tara; 5. Eto Shundor Prithibi Chere; 6. Bidhata Diyeche Eke; 7. Amar Ektai Jibon; 8. Tomar Amar Vhaggo Rekhe; 9. Chander Sathe Matir Pirit; 10. Ami Ei Kul Nodir	Folk, Pop	Solo (music)	N/A	
19	"Mon Debo"	Bengali	Audio CD	Soundtek	12	1. Mon Debo; 2. Tumi Amar; 3. Aaj Bujhechi; 4. Ador kore 5. Shari Pindilam; 6. Tomake Peye; 7. Roshik Amar; 8. Ami Lakho Jonom; 9. Eto Prem Chilo; 10. Bidhata Goreche; 11. Tumi Onger Shari; 12. Asha Amar	Folk, Pop, Film	Runa Laila; Sabina Yasmin; Kanak Chapa; Uma Khan	N/A	
20	"Jiboner Jolchobi"	Bengali	Audio CD	Protune	08	1. Akasher Sobtuku Nil; 2. Jiboner Golpota Jodi; 3. Koto Dibe Ar; 4. Kichutei Bissash Hoy Na; 5. ShyamolChadore; 6. Sediner Sei Sriti; 7. Tomar Chokher Dekhay; 8. Valobeshe Sokhi Kothay	Pop	Solo Tracks by Various Artists:-: Andrew Kishore; Sonu Nigam	Aroni Yasmin	Asok Kumar Paul
21	"Salam Nomoshkar"	Bengali	Audio CD	Sangeeta Music	10	1. Salam Nomoshkar; 2. Inshallah; 3. Monta Amar Pathor; 4. Tomar Hater Putul Noy; 5. Ekta Kichu Chai; 6. Maya Lagaiya; 7. Chand Tar Pora Kopal; 8. Moner Manush Biraj Kore; 9. Tumi Jodi Jochna Hote; 10. Matir Ongo Hoibo Sango	Pop	Solo (music)	Anurup Aich	Ali Akbar Rupu; Dipok
22	"Shudhu Valobasho"	Bengali	Audio CD	Sangeeta Music	10	1. Valobasha Harayna Kokhono; 2. Piriti Koriya; 3. Vanga Chala Vanga Ghore; 4. Rup Dekhaiya; 5. Boyosh Kuri; 6. Nodir Dhare; 7. Bare Bare Moner Vule; 8. Akasher Chad Tara; 9. Ami Ondho Tomar Preme; 10. Koto Valobasho Tumi	Pop	Baby Naznin	Delowar Arjuda Sharaf	Ahmed Kislu
23	"Kare Bole Bhalobasa"	Bengali	Audio CD & Streaming media	Sonali Products	10	1. Kare Bole Bhalobasa; 2. Surayyare Surayya; 3. O Shobnom Tomari Moton; 4. Dak Diyachen Doyal; 5. Koto Rongo Janore Manush; 6. Ami Dhaka Sohor Chere; 7. Haire Manush Rongin Fanush; 8. Tora Dek Dekhre Chahiya; 9. Ami Chokhu Diya Dekhtesilam; 10. Dere De Glass Bhore De	Film	Syed Abdul Hadi	Moniruzzaman Monir; Syed Shamsul Haque; Amjad Hossain	Satya Saha; Alauddin Ali; Alam Khan; Rocket Mondol
24	"Salman Shesh Upohar"	Bengali	Audio CD	Anupam Recording Media	05	1. Amar Nakeri Ful Bolere; 2. Valo Achi Valo Theko; 3. Tumi Amar Emoni Ekjon; 4. Dekha Na Hole Ekdin; 5. Shudhu Ekbar Bolo Valobashi	Film	Runa Laila; Sabina Yasmin; Kanak Chapa; Agun	Ahmed Imtiaz Bulbul; Rudra Mohammad Shahidullah; Moniruzzaman Monir	Ahmed Imtiaz Bulbul; Abu Taher; Alauddin Ali
25	"Ontore Bahire Tumi" (A compilation of Andrew's best 30 Songs from various audio albums)	Bengali	Audio CD & Streaming media	Sangeeta Music	1. Buker Bhitorey ^{(Album - Ontore Bahire Tumi)}; 2. Mitthe Ovijog ^{(Album - Valobashar Jonmodin)}; 3. Radha Premer ^{(Album - Kon Baganer Ful)}; 4. Mitthey Ovijog ^{(Album - Ontore Bahire Tumi)}; 5. Inshallah ^{(Album - Salam Nomoshkar)}; 6. Chokher Jole Ami ^{(Album - Abar Firey Elam)}; 7. Joto Khushi Betha Dio ^{(Album - Dukkho Amar Chiro Shathi)}; 8. Eto Shundor Prithibi Chere ^{(Album - Golper Shuruta Shundor)}; 9. Moner Manush Biraj Kore ^{(Album - Moner Manush Biraj Kore)}; 10. Bhalobasha ^{(Album - Bhalobeshe Oporadhi)}; 11. Moyna Amar ^{(Album - Valobashar Jonmodin)}; 12. Kon Baganer Ful ^{(Album - Kon Baganer Ful)}; 13. Inshaallah ^{(Album - Ontore Bahire Tumi)}; 14. Monta Amar Pathor ^{(Album - Salam Nomoshkar)}; 15. Valobashe Gelam Sudhu ^{(Album - Abar Firey Elam)}; 16. Aaj Sokale Ghum Bhangtei ^{(Album - Dukkho Amar Chiro Shathi)}; 17. Bidhata Diyeche Eke ^{(Album - Golper Shuruta Shundor)}; 18. Ekta Kichu Chai ^{(Album - Ekta Kichu Chai)}; 19. Ore Manush ^{(Album - Bhalobeshe Oporadhi)}; 20. Pagol Pagol ^{(Album - Valobashar Jonmodin)}; 21. Gaye Fira Jai ^{(Album - Ontore Bahire Tumi)}; 22. Mayer Mazar ^{(Album - Kon Baganer Ful)}; 23. Salam Namoshker ^{(Album - Ontore Bahire Tumi)}; 24. Tomar Hater Putul Noy ^{(Album - Salam Nomoshkar)}; 25. Chinli Nare Chinli Na ^{(Album - Abar Firey Elam)}; 26. Prithibi Ghumiye Geche ^{(Album - Dukkho Amar Chiro Shathi)}; 27. Amar Ektai Jibon ^{(Album - Golper Shuruta Shundor)}; 28. Ar Konodin Ei Shohore ^{(Album - Ar Konodin Ei Shohore)}; 29. Chander Sathe ^{(Album - Bhalobeshe Oporadhi)}; 30. Ek Poloke Ektu Dekha ^{(Album - Valobashar Jonmodin)}			Solo (music)	Delowar Arjuda Sharaf; Ahmed Imtiaz Bulbul; Mithu Hasan; Anurup Aich; Kamruzzaman Kajol; Utpol Das; Prince Mahmud	Ahmed Imtiaz Bulbul; Alam Khan; Mannan Mohammad; Ali Akbar Rupu; Pronob Ghosh; Arman Khan; Emon Saha; Prince Mahmud
25	"Cholo Palai"	Bengali	Audio CD	Suranjoli	2	1. Tore Ami Bhuli Nai; 2. Phire Takao Konna"	Folk, Classical	Momtaz Begum		
26	"Rupoboti Konna"	Bengali	Audio CD	Sangeeta	10	1. "Abar Phire Takao Konna"; 2. "Choitro Boishakh Khorar Mashe"; 3. "Moinamoti Nodir Pare"; 4. "Pirite Pindhailo Chhira Tena"; 5. "Tumi Je Amar Bondhu"; 6. "Jaiyo Na Jaiyo Na Bondhu"; 7. "Tore Ami Ajo Bhuli Nai"; 8. "Aaj Tumi Onno Ghore"; 9. "Dukkher Kotha Bolbo Ami Kare"; 10. "Bajlo Banshi Chharlo Gaari"	Folk, Classical	Momtaz Begum		

=== Songs for television ===
Year	Show	Song	Composer(s)	Writer(s)	Co-singer(s)
2000	"Ityadi"	"Ekusher Pal Tule"	Ali Akbar Rupu	Mohammed Rafiquzzaman	Sabina Yasmin

=== Non-film songs ===
Year	Film	Song	Composer(s)	Songwriter(s)	Co-artist(s)
1999	Single	"Poddo Patar Pani Noy"	N/A	N/A	solo
2019	Single	"Phuler Gondher Moto"	Alam Khan	Syed Shamsul Haque	solo

== Awards and nominations ==
Rewards	Years	Prize category	Selected Movies / Songs	Results
National Film Awards (Bangladesh)	1982	Best Male Playback Singer	Boro Bhalo Lok Chhilo	Won
National Film Awards (Bangladesh)	1987	Best Male Playback Singer	Surrender	Won
National Film Awards (Bangladesh)	1989	Best Male Playback Singer	Khotipuron	Won
National Film Awards (Bangladesh)	1991	Best Male Playback Singer	Padma Meghna Jamuna	Won
National Film Awards (Bangladesh)	1996	Best Male Playback Singer	Kabul	Won
National Film Awards (Bangladesh)	2000	Best Male Playback Singer	Aaj Gaye Holud	Won
National Film Awards (Bangladesh)	2007	Best Male Playback Singer	Saajghor	Won
National Film Awards (Bangladesh)	2008	Best Male Playback Singer	Ki Jadu Korila	Won
Bachsas Awards	1984	Best Male Playback Singer	Princes Tina Khan	Won
Bachsas Awards	1987	Best Male Playback Singer	Shami Stri	Won
Bachsas Awards	2001	Best Male Playback Singer	Premer Taj Mahal	Won
Bachsas Awards	2008	Best Male Playback Singer	Mone Prane Acho Tumi	Won
Bachsas Awards	2010	Best Male Playback Singer	Golapi Ekhon Bilate	Won
Meril Prothom Alo Awards	1998	Best Singer (Male)		Won
Meril Prothom Alo Awards	1999	Best Singer (Male)	Poddo Patar Pani	Won
Meril Prothom Alo Awards	2000	Best Singer (Male)		Won
Ifad Film Club Award	2012	Best Playback Singer (Male)		Won
