= Abu Taher discography =

Abu Taher (1954–1999) was a Bangladeshi music director. He has scored music for 31 films. The following is a list of films he scored:

== 1980s ==
Year	Film	Notes
1989	Beder Meye Jyotsna	
1989	Khotipuron	

== 1990s ==
Year	Film	Notes
1991	Beder Meye Jyotsna	
1992	Bedenir Prem	
1993	Mayer Ashirbad	composed alongside Ali Hossain
1993	Meyer Adhikar	
1994	Balika Holo Bodhu	
1994	Don	
1994	Tumi Amar	
1994	Stree Hotya	
1995	Agni Sontan	
1995	Dost Amar Dushmon	
1996	Banshiwala	
1996	Jibon Songsar	
1996	Morjadar Lorai	
1997	Abdullah	
1997	Khoma Nei	
1998	Bhalobashar Ghor	
1998	Mrityur Mukhe	
1999	Ajker Dapot	
1999	Buk Bhora Bhalobasha	
1999	Golay Golay Pirit	
1999	Laal Badshah	
1999	Parle Thekao	
1999	Rani Keno Dakaat	
1999	Spordha	

== 2000s ==
Year	Film	Notes
2000	Heera Chuni Panna	composed alongside Ahmed Imtiaz Bulbul
2000	Hingsro Thaba	
2000	Teji Sontan	
2001	E Badhon Jabena Chhire	
