= Ali Akbar Rupu =

Bangladeshi music composer

Ali Akbar Rupu আলী আকবর রুপু

Background information
- Born: August 31, 1960; Bikrampur
- Died: 22 February 2018 (aged 57) Dhaka, Bangladesh
- Occupation: Music composer
- Years active: 1980-2018

Ali Akbar Rupu (died 22 February 2018) was a Bangladeshi music composer and music director. He composed songs for Bangladeshi television magazines programme Ityadi and films including Rastar Chhele and Dui Biyai-er Kirti.

== Career ==
Rupu started his career by working on 'An Accident' album in 1980. In 1982, he played guitar and keyboard in the band 'Uccharon'. He composed songs for most of the notable singers in Bangladesh. Notable songs he composed include Kumar Bishwajit's "Ekdin Kannar rol uthbe amar barite", "Jare ghor dila songsar dila", "Jassu jemon mukhush pore probesh kore ghore", "dardiya", "e onchoyata", "Ek pashla bristi', Andrew Kishore's "Padma patar pani noy", Sabina Yasmin, Kanak Chapa and Samina Chowdhury's "Sob chaoya kache paoya" and Niaz Mohammad Chowdhury's "Kobitar moto meyeti, golper moto cheleti" etc.

Rupu also composed station ID music for Banglavision.

== Personal life ==
Rupu was married to Nargis Akbar in 1985. They had a son, Ali Afzal Sidney and a daughter, Fariha Naz Apon. Rupu's father Ustad Mansur Ali was also a composer and violinist. His paternal uncle Dhir Ali Miah was a Ekushey Padak winning composer. Musician Alauddin Ali was his mother's cousin.
