= Abu Taher (disambiguation) =

Abu Taher (1938–1976) was a Bangladeshi military officer and political activist.

Abu Taher may also refer to:

- Shams al-Dawla (died 1021), title of Abu Taher, former ruler of Hamadan, Iran
- Abu Taher (family), Persian family of potters and one historian (1205–1333)
- Abu Taher (banker) (c. 1932–2004), Bangladeshi banker and politician
- Abu Taher (artist) (1936–2020), Bangladeshi painter and Ekushey Padak winner
- Abu Taher (rear admiral), former chief of staff of Bangladesh Navy
- Abu Taher (composer) (1954–1999), Bangladeshi music director
- Abu Taher (academic), Bangladeshi academic
- Abu Taher Mondal (born 1967), Bengali politician of Meghalaya
