= Hayre Manush Rangin Phanush =

1982 song by Andrew Kishore

Song by Andrew Kishore

from the album Boro Bhalo Lok Chhilo
- Language: Bengali
- Released: 1982
- Studio: Shruti Recording, Dhaka, Bangladesh
- Genre: Dhallywood
- Length: 3:55
- Label: G-Series
- Composer: Alam Khan
- Lyricist: Syed Shamsul Haque
- Producer: Alam Khan

Music video
- "Hayre Manush Rangin Phanush" on YouTube

Hayre Manush Rangin Phanush is a National Award-winning song from the 1982 Bangladeshi film Boro Bhalo Lok Chhilo. The song written by veteran poet Syed Shamsul Haque, composed by Alam Khan and sung by Andrew Kishore. Anwar Hossain and Prabir Mitra performed in the song.

== Background ==
The song was recorded at the Shruti Studio in Magbazar.

== Release ==
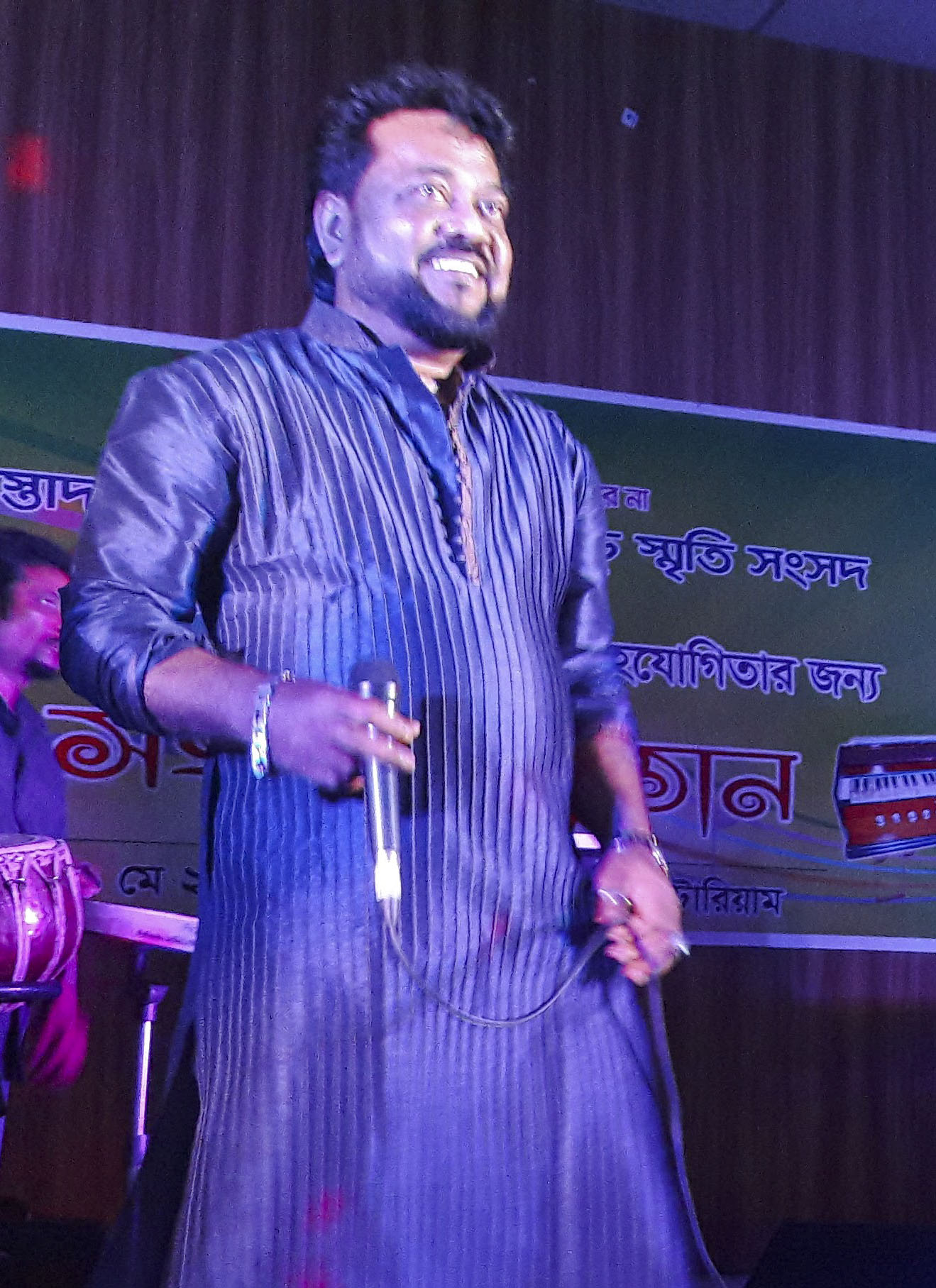
Andrew Kishore.

The song was released on 1982 as the part of soundtrack album of the film. Thirty-six years after the film release, the song was revealed under the banner of G-Series on there official YouTube channel on 5 April 2018.

== Accolades ==
Year	Awards	Category	Nominated	Result	Ref
1982	National Film Awards	Best Music Director	Alam Khan	Won	
1982	National Film Awards	Best Male Playback Singer	Andrew Kishore	Won	
