= Hanif Sanket =

Bangladeshi media personality

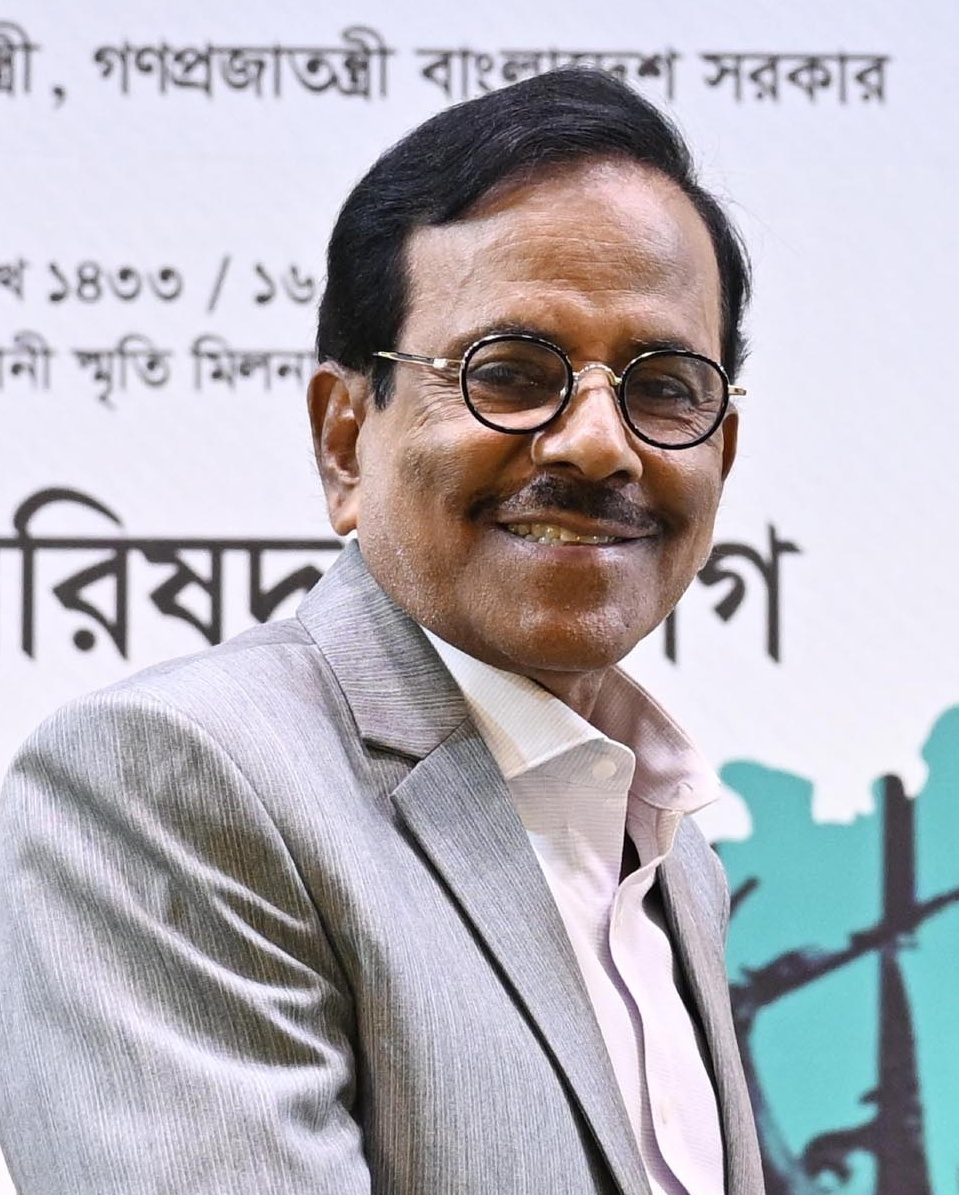
- Hanif in 2026
- Born: A K M Hanif; October 23, 1958 (age 67); Barishal, Bangladesh
- Occupations: Television host, writer, producer, singer, voice actor
- Years active: 1985–present
- Known for: Ityadi, Jodi Kichu Mone Na Koren
- Spouse: Sanjida Hanif
- Children: Fagun; Bornona
- Father: Abdul Hakim Hawladar
- Awards: Ekushey Padak (2010); Independence Award (2026)

Hanif Sanket (born 23 October 1958) born as A.K.M. Hanif is a Bangladeshi television host, writer, producer, comedian, voice actor and singer. He was awarded Ekushey Padak (2010) and Independence Day Award (2026) by the government of Bangladesh.

== Career ==
Sanket first appeared in television on a show Jodi Kichhu Mone Na Koren in the 1980s. Later, he moved on to create his own TV show Ityadi, which successfully pioneered televised magazine and comedy program in Bangladesh and went on to become the most popular TV show in the country. He also produces drama during Eid seasons.

Sanket also produced other shows – Jhalak, Kothar Kotha, Eid Annondo Mela, Prothom Alo Awards Program, Bangla Vision 6th Anniversary Programs.

== Social Contribution ==
For over 30 years, he has addressed social issues through the television program Ityadi. Each episode highlights contemporary events and controversies, often using humor and visual segments. Various surveys, including one conducted by the BBC, have reported the program’s popularity, with some indicating that a significant proportion of television viewers in the country watch the show.

== Acting and Vocalist ==
=== Plays ===
- 'Kusum' – Director Humayun Ahmed.

=== Films ===
- 'Agman' (1988) – as a villain.
- 'Wife of Champa Danga'.
- "Dhaka-86".

=== Singers in Films ===
- 'First Love' – Director AJ Mintoo. The first lyrics of the song – 'Tu tu tu tu tu ta ra Marzina's father markamara'.

== Awards ==
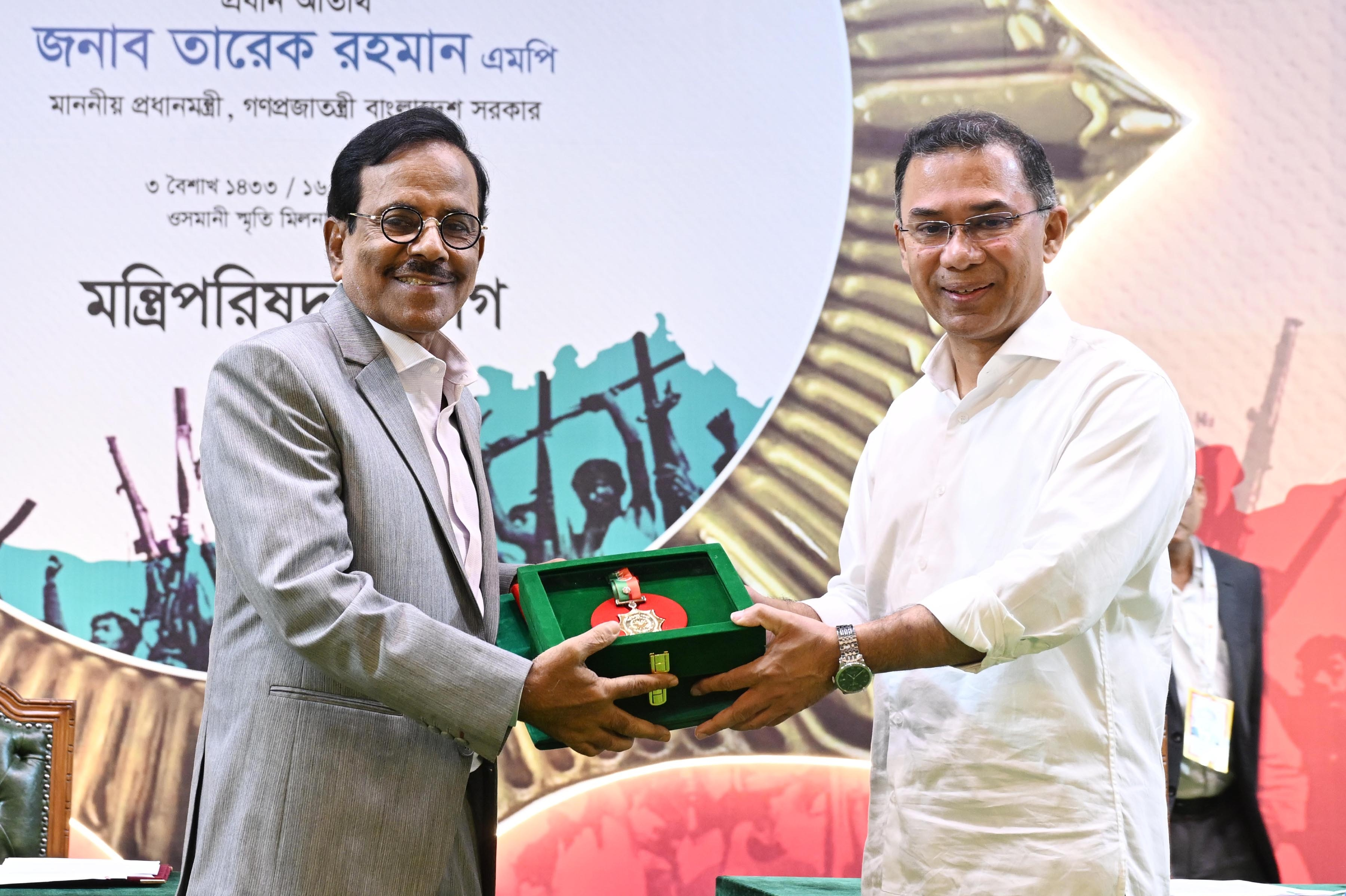
- Sanket receives Independence Award 2026 from Prime Minister Tarique Rahman
  Independence Award (2026)
- Ekushey Padak for social activities (2010)
- National Poribesh Padak for environmental awareness activities (2014)
- Meril Prothom Alo Awards best television magazine.

Also, he has received many awards at home and abroad.

== Personal life ==
Sanket's father Abdul Hakim Hawladar was a police officer. Sanket grew up with 2 older brothers, 1 older sister and 2 younger sisters. His younger sister Jahanara Begum died on 31 December 2022, due to brain hemorrhage.

Sanket is married to Sanjida Hanif. He has one son Sadman Rafid Fagun and one daughter, Sindida Hanif Bornona.
