= Boro Bhalo Lok Chhilo =

- Poster
- Bengali: বড় ভালো লোক ছিল
- Directed by: Mohammad Mohiuddin
- Starring: Abdur Razzak; Prabir Mitra; Anju Ghosh; Saifuddin Ahmed
- Music by: Alam Khan
- Release date: 1982
- Running time: 158 minutes
- Country: Bangladesh
- Language: Bengali

Boro Bhalo Lok Chhilo (Bengali: বড় ভালো লোক ছিল; English: He Was a Good Man) is a 1982 Dhallywood drama film directed by famous journalist and director Mohammad Mohiuddin. This film received National Film Awards in six categories.

== Plot ==
Yasin is a well-educated son of a Pir of a village. Suddenly his father dies in a truck accident. Yasin returns to his village and searches for the truck driver to avenge his father's death. Since he is the son of the Pir, people of the village respect him and find something spiritual in him. He ignores it and starts staying in the home of one of his father's friends. Sometimes he talks with his father through his spiritual ability.

Pori Banu is the daughter of his father's friend and in a relationship with truck driver, Lokman. Yasin and Pori Banu become good friends. Meanwhile, he realizes his spiritual ability and starts accomplishing tasks quickly and easily. But when he starts falling in love with Pori, the power starts diminishing and he tries to get it back.

== Cast ==
- Abdur Razzak - Yasin
- Prabir Mitra - Lokman
- Anju Ghosh - Pori Banu
- Saifuddin Ahmed
- Anwar Hossain
- Abdul Matin

== Soundtrack ==
The music of this film was directed by Alam Khan and lyrics were penned by Syed Shamsul Haque.

Track	Singer(s)	Lyricist	Music director
Hayre Manush Rangin Phanush	Andrew Kishore	Syed Shamsul Haque	Alam Khan
Ami Chokkho Diya Dekhte Chhilam	Syed Shamsul Haque	Syed Shamsul Haque	Alam Khan
Elahi Alamin Allah Badshah	Andrew Kishore and Syed Abdul Hadi	Syed Shamsul Haque	Alam Khan
Tora Dekh Dekhre Chahiya	Andrew Kishore	Syed Shamsul Haque	Alam Khan
Chamelio Tel Diya	Shammi Akter and Biplab Bhattacharya	Syed Shamsul Haque	Alam Khan
Pagol Pagol Manushgula	Runa Laila	Syed Shamsul Haque	Alam Khan

== Awards ==
Award Title	Category	Awardee	Result
National Film Awards	Best Director	Mohammad Mohihuddin	Won
National Film Awards	Best Actor	Abdur Razzak	Won
National Film Awards	Best Actor in a Supporting Role	Prabir Mitra	Won
National Film Awards	Best Music Director	Alam Khan	Won
National Film Awards	Best Male Playback Singer	Andrew Kishore	Won
National Film Awards	Best Dialogue	Syed Shamsul Haque	Won

== See also ==
- Dui Poisar Alta
