= Anju Ghosh =

Indian-Bangladeshi film actress

- Born: Anjali Ghosh; 1956; Bhanga, Faridpur, East Pakistan
- Occupation: Actress
- Years active: 1982–2018
- Notable work: Beder Meye Josna

Anjali "Anju" Ghosh is an actress who has worked in Bangladeshi and Indian (Tollywood) films. She is notable for her role in the film Beder Meye Josna (Josna, the Gypsy Daughter) in 1989.

== Career ==
Ghosh debuted in film acting through her role in Soudagor (1982), directed by F. Kabir Chowdhury.

Ghosh acted in around 50 films. Her co-actors included Abdur Razzak, Zafar Iqbal, Wasim and Ilias Kanchan from Bangladesh and Ranjit Mallick, Chiranjeet Chakraborty and Prosenjit Chatterjee from India.

Ghosh released a music album, Malik Chhara Chithi, in 1990 which included 12 songs.

Ghosh left Bangladesh in 1996 and moved to Kolkata, India. She is based at Salt Lake after taking up permanent residence. In 2018, she started acting for a Bangladeshi film, Madhur Canteen, directed by Saidur Rahman Said.

== Citizenship controversy ==
After joining the Bharatiya Janata Party (BJP) in June 2019, speculation rose about Ghosh's nationality. Later, the BJP claimed that she is a citizen of India and has an Indian passport. West Bengal BJP chief Dilip Ghosh released her birth certificate, issued by the Kolkata Municipal Corporation in 2003. According to the certificate, she was born as Anju Ghosh to Sudhanya Ghosh and Binapani Ghosh on 17 September 1966 in East End Nursing Home, Kolkata.

On the other hand, in an interview with Ekushey Television in September 2018, she mentioned about her birth in 1956 in Faridpur District in the-then East Pakistan (now Bangladesh) and her moving to Chittagong before the liberation war of Bangladesh in 1971. She had added about her studies in Krishnakumari High School in Chittagong.

== Filmography ==
Year	Title	Director
1982	Soudagor	F. Kabir Chowdhury
1982	Boro Bhalo Lok Chhilo	Mohammad Mohiuddin
1984	Chondon Diper Raj Konna	Ibne Mizan
1989	Beder Meye Josna	Tojammel Haque Bokul
1991	Beder Meye Josna	Tojammel Haque Bokul
1992	Bedenir Prem	Swapan Saha
1992	Garial Bhai	Tojammel Hoque Bokul
1993	Kumari Maa	Dulal Bhowmick
1993	Rajar Meye Parul	Milan Chowdhury
2000	Gariber Samman	Swapan Saha
2018	Madhur Canteen	Saidur Rahman Said
