= Mohammad Rafiquzzaman =

Bangladeshi lyricist and National Film Award winner

- মোহাম্মদ রফিকুজ্জামান
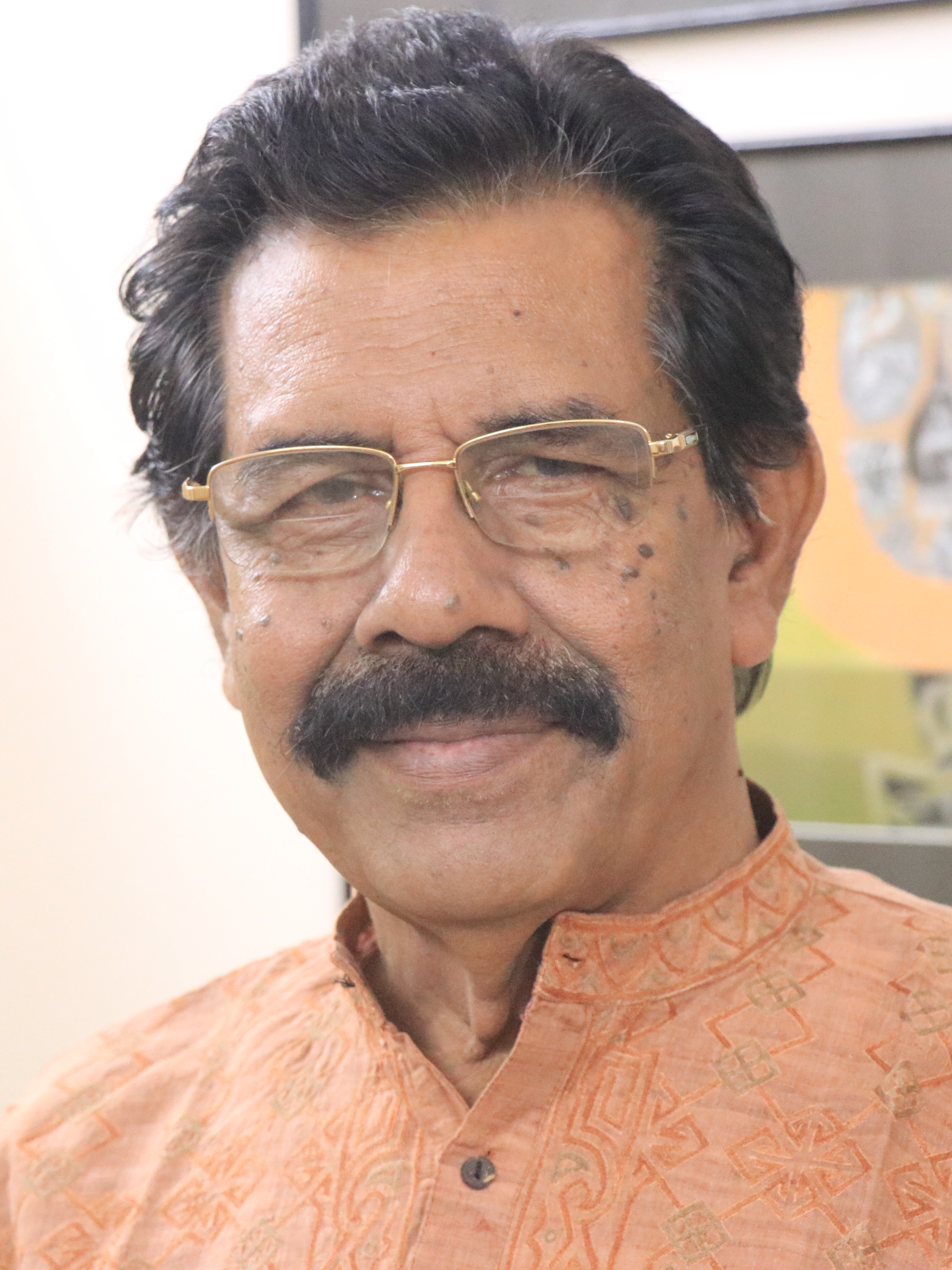
- Rafiquzzaman in 2018
- Born: 11 February 1943 (age 83); Jhenaidah, Bengal Province, British India
- Education: University of Dhaka and University of Rajshahi
- Occupation: Lyricist
- Spouse: Panna Zaman
- Children: 2
- Relatives: Mohammad Moniruzzaman (brother)
- Awards: See full list

Signature
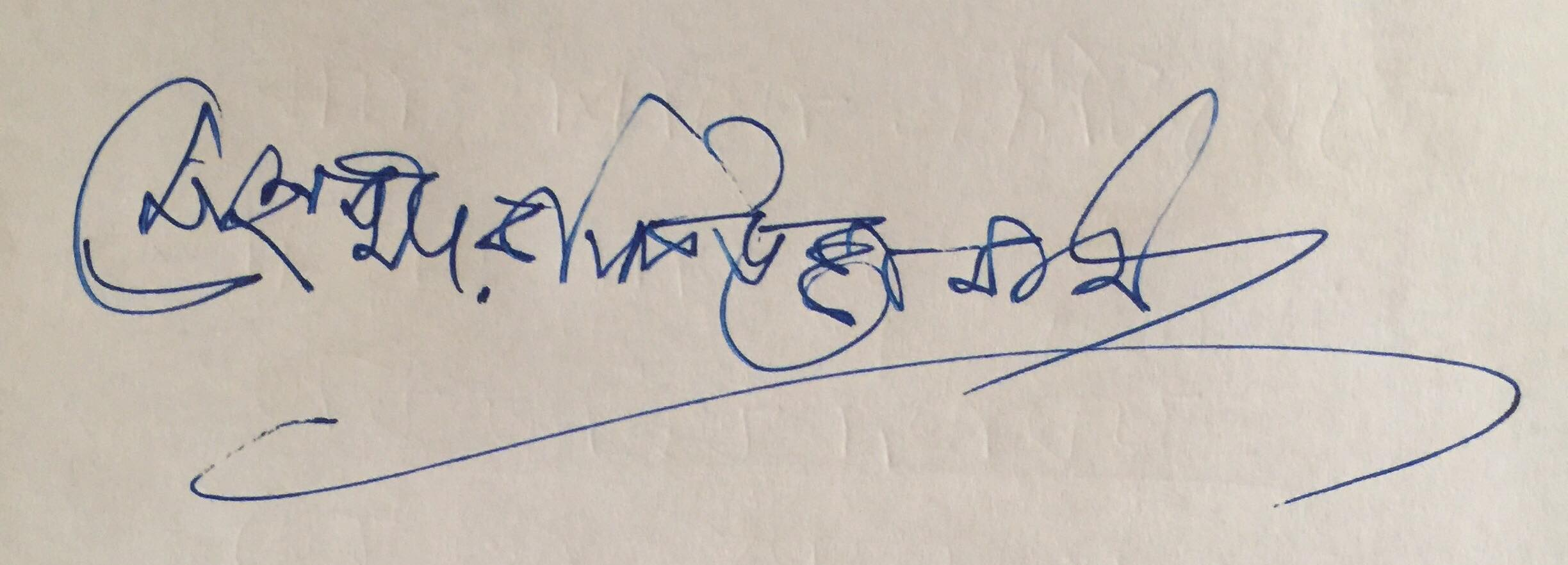

Mohammad Rafiquzzaman (born 11 February 1943) is a Bangladeshi lyricist. He was awarded Bangladesh National Film Award for Best Lyrics twice for the lyrics of "Tumi Emoni Jaal Petechho Shongshare" in Shuvoda (1986) and "Phuler Bashor Bhanglo Jokhon" in Chandranath (1984), and once for Best Story. He is credited with 2000 songs, three collections of songs, four collections of poems and three collections of essays on music.

== Career ==
Rafiquzzaman got his breakthrough in 1965 through his lyrics of the song "Mugdho Amar Ei Chokh Jokhon". He wrote a book titled Adhunik Bangla Gaan Rochonar Kolakoushal.

== Works ==
- Dukhkho Amar Bashor Raat-er Palonko
- Bondhu Hotey Cheye Tomar Shotru Boley Gonno Holaam
- Eto Shukh Shoibo Kemon Korey
- Amar Mon Pakhita Jaye Re Urey
- Amake Ekti Doyel Bolechhey
- Paharer Kanna Dekhe
- Jodi Moroner Porey Keo Proshno Korey
- Tumi Eshechho Bohudin Por
- Shobai Boley Joto Shorbonasher Muul
- Jibon Namer Railgarita paye na Khujey Station
- Amar Baul Moner Ektara Ta

== Awards ==
- Bachsas Awards
- Bangladesh National Film Award for Best Lyrics (1984, 1986)
- Bangladesh National Film Award for Best Story (2008)
- Independence Award (2024)
