= Daak Diyachhen Doyal Amare =

Bengali film song from 'Pran Sajani' released in 1979

Song by Andrew Kishore

from the album of Alam Khan, Pran Sajani
- Language: Bangla
- Released: 1979
- Genre: Bangladeshi film music
- Length: 4:33
- Composer: Alam Khan
- Lyricist: Syed Asaduddaula Shirazi
- Producer: Alam Khan

Music video
- "Daak Diyachhen Doyal Amare" on YouTube

"Daak Diyachhen Doyal Amare" is a Bengali film song belonging to the Bangladeshi film Pran Sajani released in 1979. Syed Asaduddaula Shirazi was the main lyricist of the song. Moniruzzaman Monir was credited as the lyricist of the song in the film. The song was composed by Alam Khan and performed by Bangladeshi playback artist Andrew Kishore. Due to its popularity, the song has been reproduced several times over decades. The song is all about few final days before one's death.

== History ==
Syed Asaduddaula Shirazi was the real lyricist of the song. In 1965, Shirazi published the song in one of his books. There were six songs used in Pran Sajani, among these five songs was penned by Moniruzzaman. Film producer was unawared about the original lyricist of this song, so they credited Monirizzaman solely for all lyrics. Alam Khan produced the song for the film and recorded on Andrew's voice. During recording Andrew was Higher Secondary School student.

== Popularity and influence ==
The song was an instant hit, just after the release. It is considered to be one of the most popular songs in Andrew Kishore's musical career. It quickly became popular in rural areas beyond the urban boundaries of Bangladesh. With this song, Andrew cemented his position as the playback vocalist of the film. The song is regularly performed at the tomb of Asaduddaula Shirazi to date.

== Reproduction ==
During the remake of the film Pran Sajani, in 1996; the song was re-used in the voice of Andrew Kishore. Rocket Mandal rearranged the music, keeping the original melody of Alam Khan. Tapash Paul was featured in the film for this song. Anupam Recording Media and CD Plus has released the lyrical and music video of this version separately in 2020.

The song was reproduced by Fuad al Muqtadir, sung by Anila Naz Chowdhury and was featured in the album Variation No. 25, published by G-Series in 2006. G-series later released it on YouTube on 8 January 2018. Kaushik Hossain Taposh rearrange the music with original tune of this song for Gaan Bangla's Wind of Change series. This version has recorded on Kailash Kher's voice. This version has been released on YouTube on 5 June 2019.
