= Bangladeshi Idol =

- বাংলাদেশী আইডল
- Genre: Reality television
- Created by: Simon Fuller
- Judges: Andrew Kishore; Ayub Bachchu; Ferdausi Rahman; Mehreen Mahmud
- Country of origin: Bangladesh
- Original language: Bengali
- No. of seasons: 1
- No. of episodes: 42

Production
- Producers: Delta Bay Production & Distribution Pvt. Ltd.

Original release
- Network: SA TV
- Release: 2012

Bangladeshi Idol (Bengali: বাংলাদেশী আইডল) is a Bangladeshi reality television singing competition produced and distributed by Delta Bay Production & Distribution Pvt. Ltd. It started airing on SA TV, a new private satellite television channel in Bangladesh as an addition to the Idol franchise based on the original UK show Pop Idol. Imtu Ratish was the host. The show was won by Mong u Ching Marma.

== See also ==
- CloseUp1
