= Beder Meye Josna =

Bangladeshi film

- Directed by: Tojammel Haque Bakul
- Produced by: Abbas Ullah Shikder
- Starring: Ilias Kanchan; Anju Ghosh; Saifuddin Ahmed; Shawkat Akbar; Prabir Mitra; Rawshan Jamil
- Cinematography: Rafiqul Bari Chowdhury
- Edited by: Fazle Haque
- Music by: Abu Taher
- Production company: Anandomela Cholocchitro
- Distributed by: S.M. Abbas; Matiur Rahman Pannu
- Release date: 9 June 1989
- Running time: 122 minutes
- Country: Bangladesh
- Language: Bengali
- Budget: ৳20 lakh (equivalent to ৳1.7 crore or US$140,000 in 2024)
- Box office: ৳20 crore (equivalent to ৳172 crore or US$14 million in 2024)

Beder Meye Josna (lit. 'Bede's Daughter Josna') is a 1989 Bangladeshi romantic fantasy drama film directed by Tozammel Hossain Bakul and produced by Abbas Ullah Shikder under the banner of Tripti Films. Starring Ilias Kanchan and Anju Ghosh in the lead roles, the film is based on a popular Bengali folk tale about the love story between a snake charmer's daughter and a prince.

Upon release, Beder Meye Josna became an unprecedented box office success, emerging as the highest-grossing Bangladeshi film of all time, a record it held for over three decades (1989–2023) until it was overtaken by Priyotoma. Its songs, composed by Alauddin Ali, became hugely popular, particularly the title song, performed by Runa Laila and Andrew Kishore. The film is considered an all-time classic in Bangladeshi cinema.

== Plot ==
In Bangladesh, Bede refers to a group of people who make their living by catching snakes and entertaining people by making the snakes dance to the tune of their flutes. Josna is a girl from this community. One day a poisonous snake bites the foot of a local prince. A bede is called to cure the prince. He sees the wound and declares that only Josna can extract the poison from the prince's blood. The king calls Josna and asks her to save his son, in exchange for which he agrees to give her anything she wants. Josna cures the prince but becomes ill in the process. After her mother and the queen pray for her, she recovers and demands the hand of the prince as her reward, but the king balks. When the prince, now recovered, learns what has transpired, he falls in love with Jyotsna. After a long tug-of-war, the couple persuade the king to consent to their union, and they marry.

== Cast ==
- Ilyas Kanchan as Anwar
- Anju Ghosh as Josna
- Mithun as Razzaq
- Farzana Bobby as Tara
- Saifuddin Ahmed as Bede Sardar
- Nasir Khan as Mubarak
- Shawkat Akbar as Sagar Mudak
- Prabir Mitra as Apon Mudak
- Rawshan Jamil as Zosner's grandmother
- Dildar as Moni
- Abbas as zamindar
- Sushma
- Maya Chowdhury
- Manzur Rahi
- Nader
- Ghulam Sharif Khan
- Fazal Rahman

== Music ==
Beder Meye Josna

Soundtrack album by Rathindranath Roy, Sabina Yasmin, Runa Laila, Andrew Kishore, Khurshid Alam, Mujib Pardeshi
- Released: 1989
- Genre: Film music
- Language: Bengali
- Producer: Abu Taher

Abu Taher directed the music of Beder's daughter Josna. The film has eleven songs. The film's director, Tozammel Haque Bakul, composed the lyrics for ten of these eleven songs. The audio cassette of the film's songs sold one lakh copies within a month of its release. The song, written by Veda's daughter Josna Amay, became a huge hit. The song "Ami Bandi Jail" written by Hasan Matiur Rahman and sung by Mujib Pardesi, is still popular. The tune of the title song, "Beder meye Jyotsna amay katha diyeche," was adopted from the song "Ek pardesi mera dil le gaya" from the film Phagun (1958).

Beder Meye Josn soundtrack – track listing
No.	Title	Lyrics	Singers	Length
1.	"Mayay gora ei songsare"	Tozammel Haque Bakul	Rathindranath Roy
2.	"O rani salam barebar/Pahariya shaper khela"	Tozammel Haque Bakul	Sabina Yasmin
3.	"Esho esho sahazada... go"	Tozammel Haque Bakul	Runa Laila and Andrew Kishore
4.	"Beder meye josna amay kotha diyeche"	Tozammel Haque Bakul	Runa Laila and Andrew Kishore
5.	"Prem jamuna satar dilam... go"	Tozammel Haque Bakul	Runa Laila
6.	"Ki dhon ami chaibo raja... go"	Tozammel Haque Bakul	Runa Laila
7.	"O tui dakli jare apon kore"	Tozammel Haque Bakul	Rathindranath Roy
8.	"Merona merona jollad... go"	Tozammel Haque Bakul	Runa Laila
9.	"Amaro lagiya re bondhu"	Tozammel Haque Bakul	Sabina Yasmin and Andrew Kishore
10.	"Ore tara tui dili dhora"	Tozammel Haque Bakul	Khurshid Alam and Runa Laila
11.	"Maa... ami bondi karagare"	Hasan Matiur Rahman	Mujib Pardeshi

== Reception ==
It was the highest-grossing Bangladeshi film by earning approximately ৳25 crore gross till 2023, which was surpassed by Priyotoma in 2023. It was ranked fifth among the top 10 Bangladeshi films in an audience poll by the British Film Institute.

== Remake ==
The film was remade in West Bengal in 1991 with the same name, which features Chiranjeet Chakraborty and Anju Ghosh reprising her role. In 2019, Bongo BD bought the rights from Anandamela Cholocchitro for another remake of the film, which was later cancelled.

== Cancelled sequel ==
In 2018, producer Nader Khan of Rajesh Film proposed a sequel to the film on the day of the reception ceremony for Anju Ghosh at Bangladesh Film Development Corporation named Josna Keno Bonobase. However, this was later cancelled.

== See also ==
- List of highest-grossing Bangladeshi films
