= Amar Bhitor Bahire Ontore Ontore =

Bengali poem, song

- by Rudra Mohammad Shahidullah
- First published in: 1986
- Language: Bangla
- Subject(s): Love, Severance, Sorrow, Desire
- Lines: 28

"Amar Bhitor Bahire Ontore Ontore/Bhalo Achi Bhalo Theko"
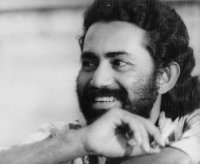
- Rudra Mohammad Shahidullah

Song by Rudra Mohammad Shahidullah
- Language: Bangla
- Released: 1996, 2006, ?, 1992
- Composer: Rudra Mohammad Shahidullah
- Lyricist: Rudra Mohammad Shahidullah
- Performer(s): Andrew Kishore & Kanak Chapa; Kabir Suman & Sabina Yasmin; Symphony; TeerThak; Album(s): Tomakey Chai; Tero; Anubhabe; Duari; Label(s): Anupam; Cozmic Harmony; Sargam Records; Sangeet

Music video
- ভাল আছি ভাল থেকো - Andrew Kishore & Kanak Chapa on YouTube

Music video
- Cozmik Harmony II Taero II Kabir Suman II Sabina Yasmin on YouTube

Music video
- অনুভবে - Symphony on YouTube

Music video
- ভাল আছি ভাল থেকো - Teerthak on YouTube

Music video
- Amar Bhitoro Bahire - Andrew Kishore - Anupam on YouTube

Āmāra bhitara bāhirē antarē antarē (Bengali: আমার ভিতর বাহিরে অন্তরে অন্তরে), also known as ভালো আছি ভালো থেকো (Bhālō āchi bhālō thēkō) is a Bengali romantic poem written by Bangladeshi poet Rudra Mohammad Shahidullah. It was later adopted as a song, which gained notable popularity in Bangladesh and the Indian state of West Bengal.

== History ==
Rudra Mohammad Shahidullah was the former spouse of writer Taslima Nasrin, who were separated in 1986. This song was regarded by Shahidullah as a suicide note to Nasrin.

The song become popular in Bangladesh after it was used in a Bengali drama serial aired in Bangladesh Television in 1992. It was later used in the Bangladeshi movie "Tomakey Chai'' by singers Andrew Kishore & Kanak Chapa in 1996.

In 1992, the Jahangirnagar University based band, TeerThak released their first album, Duari. The song is the first track of this album.

Shahidullah was posthumously awarded with the best lyricist of 1998 by the Bangladesh Film Journalists Association.

The song was popularized in West Bengal by singer Kabir Suman, by releasing a duet album with Sabina Yasmin, titled, Tero (2006). The song is featured in this album.
