= Alam Khan (composer) =

Bangladeshi music producer & director (1943–2022)

- আলম খান
- Born: 22 October 1943; Sirajganj, Bengal Presidency, British India
- Died: 8 July 2022 (aged 78); Dhaka, Bangladesh
- Occupations: Composer, music director
- Spouse: Habibunnesa Gulbanu
- Children: 3
- Relatives: Azam Khan (brother)

Alam Khan (22 October 1943 – 8 July 2022) was a Bangladeshi composer and music director. He was awarded Bangladesh National Film Award for Best Music Director five times for the films Boro Bhalo Lok Chhilo (2005), Teen Kanya (2006), Surrender (2007), Dinkal (2008) and Ibadat (2009). He also won Best Music Composer Award for the films Bagher Thaba (2005) and Ki Jadu Korila (2008). As of 2008, Khan composed around 2000 songs and provided music direction to around 300 films. He is notable for the composition of the songs "Ore Neel Doriya Amay De Re De Chhariya", "Ami Rajanigandha", "Daak Diachhe Doyal Amarey", "Hayre Manush Rangin Phanush" and "Tumi Jekhaney Ami Shekhaney".

== Early life and career ==
Khan was born on 22 October 1943 in Baniagati village in what is now Sirajganj District of Bangladesh. His father Aftab Uddin Khan was an administrative officer of the Secretariat Home Department and his mother Jobeda Khanam was a housewife. Khan took music lessons from Nani Chatterjee and Karim Shahabuddin. Along with his friends, he formed an orchestra group "Ritu Orchestra Group". He got his first break in a stage play called "Bharate Bari". He first directed music for the Abdul Jabbar Khan's film "Kaanch Kata Heerey".

== Awards ==
- Bangladesh National Film Award for Best Music Director (5 times)
- Bangladesh National Film Award for Best Music Composer (2 times)
- Bangladesh Cine Journalists Association Award (three times)
- Bachsas Award for Best Music Director (3 times)
- 2016 Celebrating Life Lifetime Achievement award

== Personal life ==
Alam Khan left behind two sons and a daughter at the time of his death. Alam Khan is the elder brother of the famous pop singer Azam Khan. Alam Khan married lyricist Habibunnesa Gulbanu in 1976, who died a few years before his death. Gulbanu is the lyricist of the song 'Tumito Ekhon Amari Kotha Vabcho' sung by Sabina Yasmin in the tune of Alam Khan. Their two sons Arman Khan and Adnan Khan are music directors. The name of the only daughter is Anita Khan.

== Health and death ==
Khan was diagnosed with lung cancer in 2011. He died at a private hospital in Shyamoli locality of Dhaka on 8 July 2022. He was buried in Radhanagar area of Sreemangal Upazila.
