= Rudra Mohammad Shahidullah =

Bangladeshi poet (1956–1991)

- রুদ্র মুহম্মদ শহিদুল্লাহ
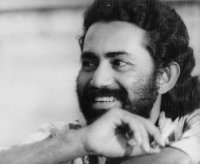
- Pronunciation: [rud̪ɾo muɦɔmːɔd̪ ʃoɦid̪ulːaʱ]
- Born: Mohammad Shahidullah; 16 October 1956; Mongla, Bagerhat district, East Pakistan
- Died: 21 June 1991 (aged 34); Dhaka, Bangladesh
- Education: Dhaka College; University of Dhaka
- Occupations: Poet; Author
- Spouse: Taslima Nasrin (m. 1982; div. 1986)
- Awards: Ekushey Padak (2024, posthumously)

Rudra Mohammad Shahidullah (Note: Bengali: রুদ্র মুহম্মদ শহিদুল্লাহ, Bengali pronunciation: [rud̪ɾo muɦɔmːɔd̪ ʃoɦid̪ulːaʱ].) (Bengali: রুদ্র মুহম্মদ শহিদুল্লাহ, pronounced [rud̪ɾo muɦɔmːɔd̪ ʃoɦid̪ulːaʱ]; 16 October 1956 – 21 June 1991) was a Bangladeshi poet noted for his revolutionary and romantic poetry. He is considered one of the leading Bengali poets of the 1970s. He received Munir Chaudhury Memorial Award in 1980 and Ekushey Padak in 2024 (33 years after his death)

He is most notable for writing the song "ভালো আছি ভালো থেকো" (Bhālō āchi bhālō thēkō) also known as "আমার ভিতর বাহিরে অন্তরে অন্তরে"(Āmāra bhitara bāhirē antarē antarē). The song was later used in various Bengali movies and television dramas.

An English translation of Rudro's selected poems, titled 'Ruddro and Beyond' was made by editor and translator Nadira Bhabna and published in 2023.

== Life ==
Shahidullah was born on 16 October 1956 in Barisal.

He passed his Secondary School Certificate (SSC) in 1974 from Dhaka West End High School and his Higher Secondary School Certificate (HSC) in 1976 from Dhaka College. He got his master's degree in Bangla from the University of Dhaka in 1983.

In 1982, Taslima Nasrin fell in love with Rudra and fled home to marry him. They divorced in 1986. He died on 21 June 1991. Shahidullah's younger brother Himel Barkat (born July 27, 1977; died November 22, 2020) said in an interview that Shahidullah died from Gastric Ulcer.

== Literary works ==
Collection of poems

- Upodruto Upokul (1979)
- Firey Chai Swarno Gram (1981)
- Manusher Manchitra (1984)
- Chhobolo (1986)
- Galpa (1987)
- Diyechhilo Shokol Akash (1988)
- Moulik Mukhosh (1990)

Poems

- Abelay Shonkhhodhoni
- Afim tobuo bhalo, Dhormo she to hemlock bish
- E kemon bhranti aamar
- Ek Glas Ondhokar Hate
- Batashe lasher gondho
- Bhalobashar somoy to nei
- Bishbrikkho bhalobasha
- Bish
- Byatha da, buke rakhbo
- Dure achho dure
- Guccho kobita
- Icchar Swar onyo rokom
- Kotha Chilo Subinoy
- Manusher Manchitro – 1
- Misile Notun Mukh
- Mone Pore Sudurer Mastul
- Chithi
- Amar Bhitor Bahire Ontore Ontore

Short stories

- Sonali Shishir

Play

- Bish Briksher Bij

== Awards ==
- 1980: Munier Choudhury Memorial Literary Award for his poetry book, Upodruto Upokul.
- 1981: Munier Choudhury Memorial Literary Award for his poetry book, Firey Chai Swarnagram.
- 1997: Bangladesh Chalachitra Sangbadik Samity award (posthumous) for the poem Amar Bhitor Bahire Ontore Ontore
- 2024: Ekushey Padak

== Rudra Mela ==
Rudra Smriti Sangsad organises an annual fair named Rudra Mela, in memory of poet Rudra Mohammad Shahidullah.
