= SA TV =

SATV
- Country: Bangladesh
- Broadcast area: Nationwide
- Headquarters: Gulshan, Dhaka

Programming
- Language: Bengali
- Picture format: 1080i HDTV (downscaled to 16:9 576i for the SDTV feed)

Ownership
- Owner: Salahuddin Ahmed (S.A. Group of Companies)

History
- Launched: 19 January 2013; 13 years ago

Links
- Website: www.satv.tv

SA TV (Bengali: এসএটিভি), the acronym of the lesser known South Asian Television, is a Bangladeshi Bengali-language satellite and cable television channel based in Gulshan, Dhaka. It is owned by the S.A. Group of Companies, one of Bangladesh's largest transportation and real estate groups. SA TV commenced transmissions on 19 January 2013.

== History ==
SA TV received its broadcasting license from the Bangladesh Telecommunication Regulatory Commission in April 2010. It commenced test transmissions on 20 April 2012, and later began official transmissions on 19 January 2013. Veteran film-maker Syed Salahuddin Zaki was the first chief operating officer of the channel and Scott Robert Craig was the first head of news. The channel launched its production house, SA Multimedia, on 26 January 2014.

SA TV won an International Quality Crown Award in 2015. In December 2016, Bangladeshi television professionals demanded SATV and three other local television channels to take dubbed foreign television series, which have gained popularity in the country, off their schedules. On 20 May 2021, SA TV, along with Channel 9, was obliged to temporarily cease operations by the Bangladesh Satellite Company Limited over unpaid satellite transponder fees, according to authorities. SA TV would resume broadcasts the following day.

== Programming ==
SA TV's programming line consists of newscasts, talk shows, dramas, national and international sports, music, movies and programming regarding health, fashion and lifestyle. It is also well known for the Bangladeshi adaptation the Idol franchise, Bangladeshi Idol, which premiered in 2013.

=== List of programmes ===
- Anandogram
- Bangladeshi Idol
- Bela Sheshe
- Chayer Cup-e Jhor
- Chup Kotha
- Come to the Point
- Crime File
- Face
- Ghorar Chal Arai Ghor
- Joiboti Konyar Mon
- Jonotar Samne Jonoprotinidhi
- Mathe Moydane
- Parampara
- Prophet Joseph (title localized as Yusuf Zulekha)
- Shine On
- Tumi Acho Tai
- Tune And Count
