= Rajshahi Government City College =

- রাজশাহী সরকারি সিটি কলেজ

Location
- Boalia, Rajshahi; Bangladesh; 24.3680°N 88.5971°E

Information
- Established: 1958
- School district: Rajshahi
- Principal: Professors Dr. Elias Uddin
- Language: Bengali
- Campus type: Urban
- Color
- Affiliation: Bangladesh National University
- Website: rgcc.ac.bd

Rajshahi Government City College is a government-owned higher secondary educational institution located in Rajshahi. It offers higher secondary, undergraduate and graduate programs, affiliated with National University, Bangladesh. It was established in 1958 and nationalized in 1982.

== History ==
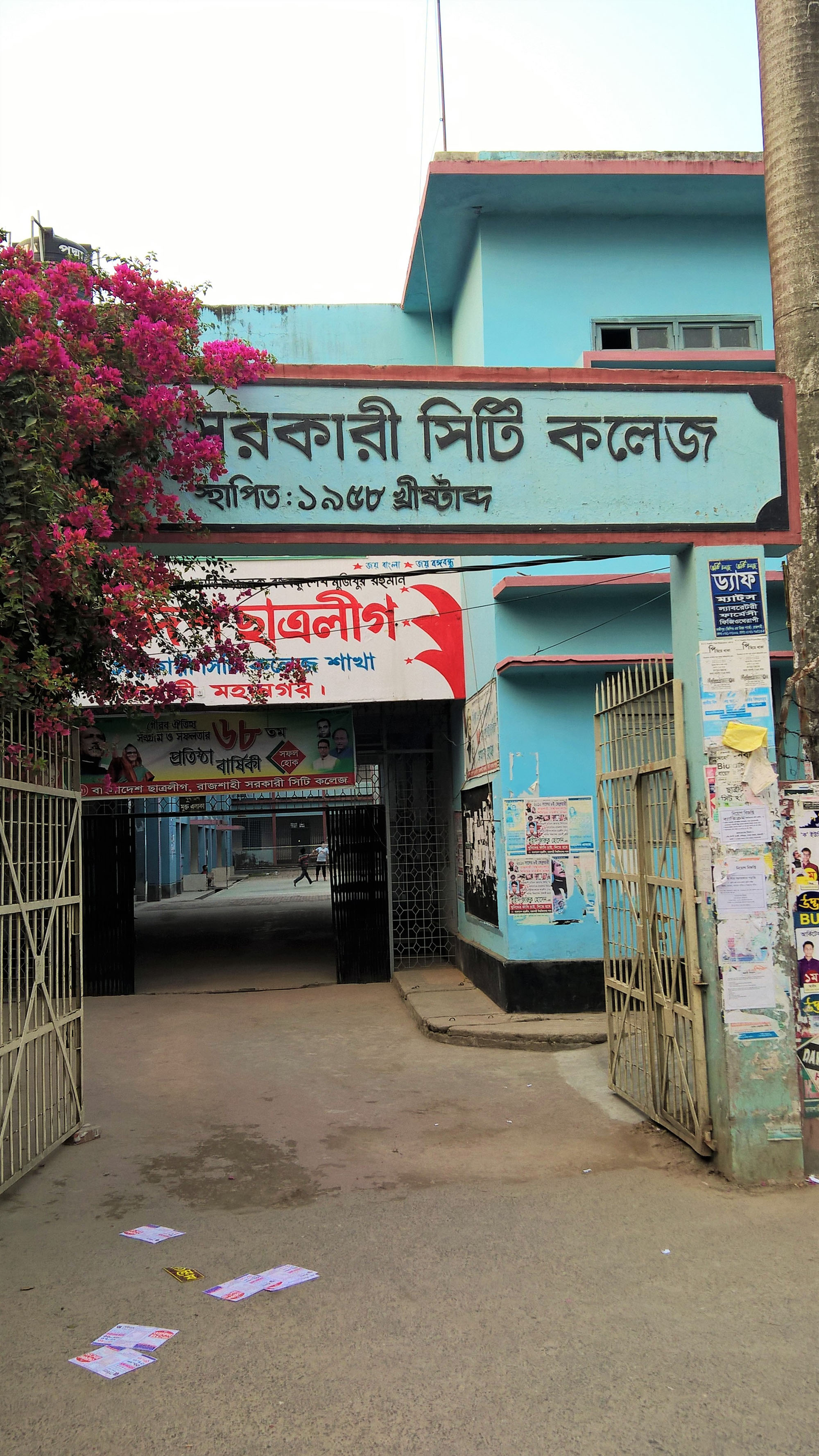
Entrance of the institution

After the partition of India, the people of the Rajshahi region suffered from lack of access to higher education. Because, then, only two institutions, Rajshahi College and a non-government college called Adina Fazlul Haque College were giving higher education to the people. So, establishing a college was an immediate desire of the people of that region. Thus, with help of local people and the administration of Rajshahi, this college was established in July 1958.

In its initial years, there was no land or building for the college. So, the academic activities are taken in Loknath high school with only 140 students. But, in 1969, the number of students of the institution was 3500. In 1958, 0.50 acres of land were bought for 18000 BDT for the college in Rajshahi city. The first principal of this college was Mohammad Abdul Karim. After some days, he died. Then, Shamshuddin Ahmed was selected as the second principal of that college.

The college nationalized in 1982. In 1999, 400 books were bought for 3075 BDT for creating a college library.

== HSC admission ==
HSC admission is done on the basis of the results of SSC or equivalent examination of the student. The merit order has to be determined on the basis of the total number obtained. Here 12000 students are admitted every year in three departments.

1. Science (600 seats)
2. Arts (300 seats) and
3. Commerce (300 seats)

== Faculties and departments ==
The institution has four faculties.

=== Faculty of Science ===
The faculty comprises the following departments,

- Department of Physics
- Department of Botany
- Department of Zoology
- Department of Mathematics
- Department of Chemistry

=== Faculty of Arts ===
The faculty comprises the following departments,

- Department of Philosophy
- Department of Bengali
- Department of English
- Department of Islamic History and Culture

=== Faculty of Business ===
The faculty comprises the following departments:

- Department of Accounting
- Department of Management

=== Faculty of Social Science ===
The faculty comprises the following departments:

- Department of Economics
- Department of Political Science

== See also ==
- Rajshahi College
- University of Rajshahi
