= Abu Taher (composer) =

Bangladeshi composer

- আবু তাহের
- Born: 1 November 1954; Dhaka, Bengal Presidency, British India
- Died: 14 July 1999 (aged 44); Dhaka, Bangladesh
- Occupations: Music composer and director
- Years active: 1978-1999

Abu Taher (1 November 1954 – 14 July 1999) was a Bangladeshi music composer. He was notable for the songs like "Prthibite Sukh Bole Jodi", " Buk Bhora Bhalobasa", "Jalaiya Premer Batti", "Tore Putuler Moto Kore Sajiye" and "Beder Meye Jyotsna Ammay Kotha Diyeche". He has composed music for 20 films in his career. His repertoire includes films Beder Meye Jyotsna (1989), Khotipuron (1989), Beder Meye Jyotsna (1991), Gariyal Bhai (1992), Kkhoma (1992), Tumi Amar (1994), Rakhal Raja (1995), Buk Bhora Bhalobasha (1999) etc.

== Early life and career ==
Abu Taher was born in a musical family. He is the eldest son of Ekushey Padak-winning music director Dhir Ali Miah. Veteran composer Alauddin Ali and composer Mansur Ali are the paternal uncles of him. His younger brother is music director Ali Akram Shuvo.

He has worked extensively with Sabina Yasmin, Runa Laila, Andrew Kishore, Kanak Chapa, Kumar Bishwajit and Dolly Sayontoni. Dolly Sayontoni has sung the maximum number of songs in her career in his films, alongside Shawkat Ali Emon and Ali Akram Shuvo.

== Discography ==
Taher has scored music for 31 films.

== 1980s ==
Year	Film	Notes
1989	Beder Meye Jyotsna	
1989	Khotipuron	

== 1990s ==
Year	Film	Notes
1991	Beder Meye Jyotsna	
1992	Bedenir Prem	
1993	Mayer Ashirbad	composed alongside Ali Hossain
1993	Meyer Adhikar	
1994	Balika Holo Bodhu	
1994	Don	
1994	Tumi Amar	
1994	Stree Hotya	
1995	Agni Sontan	
1995	Dost Amar Dushmon	
1996	Banshiwala	
1996	Jibon Songsar	
1996	Morjadar Lorai	
1997	Abdullah	
1997	Khoma Nei	
1998	Bhalobashar Ghor	
1998	Mrityur Mukhe	
1999	Ajker Dapot	
1999	Buk Bhora Bhalobasha	
1999	Golay Golay Pirit	
1999	Laal Badshah	
1999	Parle Thekao	
1999	Rani Keno Dakaat	
1999	Spordha	

== 2000s ==
Year	Film	Notes
2000	Heera Chuni Panna	composed alongside Ahmed Imtiaz Bulbul
2000	Hingsro Thaba	
2000	Teji Sontan	
2001	E Badhon Jabena Chhire	
