= Prabir Mitra =

Bangladeshi film actor (1941–2025)

Probir Mitra
- প্রবীর মিত্র
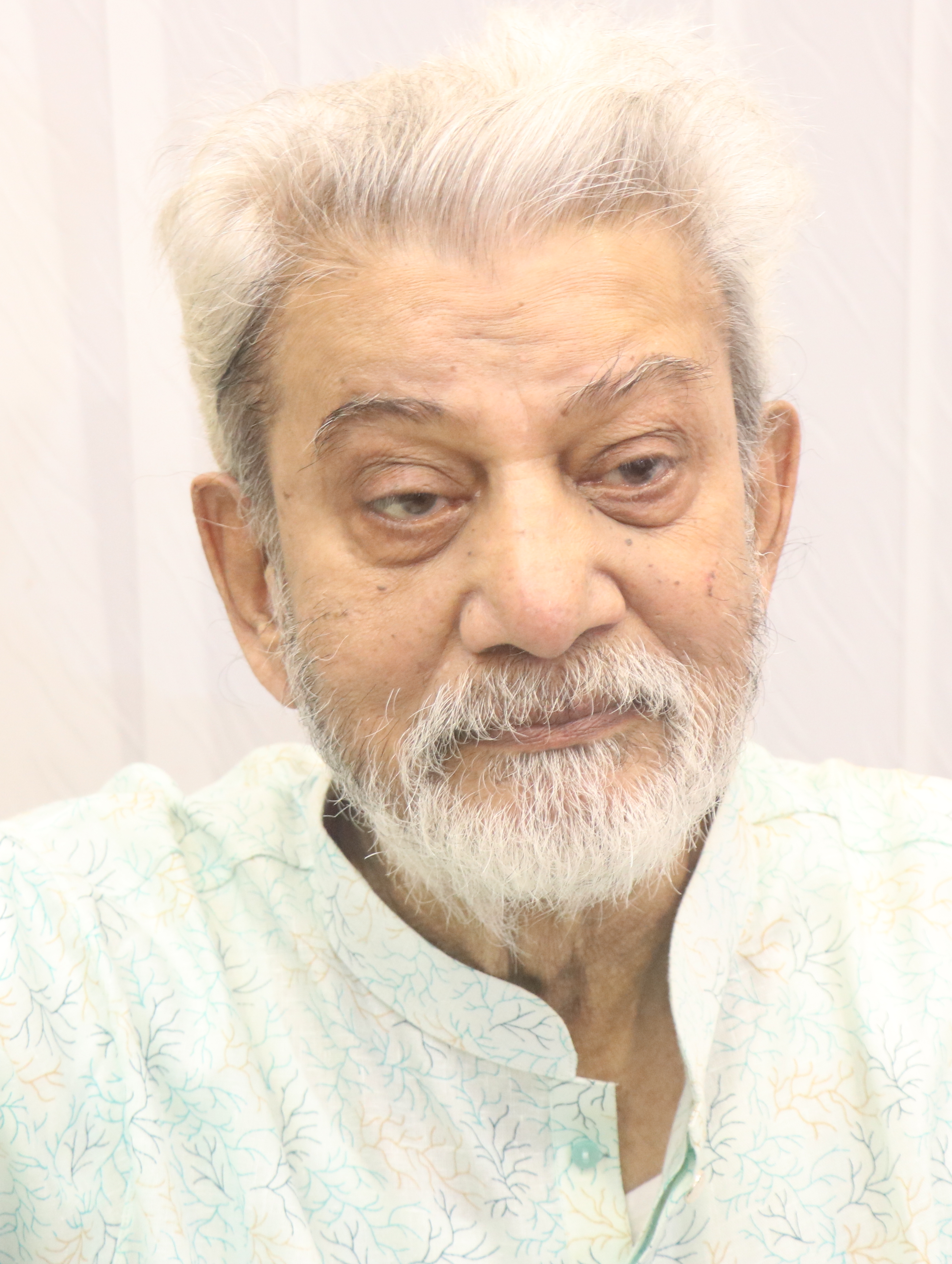
- Mitra in 2018
- Born: 18 August 1941; Chandpur, Bengal Province, British India
- Died: 5 January 2025 (aged 83); Dhaka, Bangladesh
- Burial place: Azimpur graveyard, Dhaka
- Other name: Hasan Imam
- Occupation: Actor
- Spouse: Ajanta Mitra (m. 1972–2000; her death)
- Parent(s): Gopendra Nath Mitra (father); Amiyabala Mitra (mother)
- Website: www.actorprobirmitra.com

Probir Mitra (Bengali: প্রবীর মিত্র; 18 August 1941 – 5 January 2025), later adopted Hasan Imam (Bengali: হাসান ইমাম), was a Bangladeshi film actor. (Note: Multiple references:) He won Bangladesh National Film Award for Best Supporting Actor for his performance in the film Boro Bhalo Lok Chhilo in 1982. He also won the 2018 Lifetime Achievement Award. As of 2019, he had worked on over 400 films.

== Early life and career ==
Mitra grew up in Dhaka. He studied in Pogose School along with ATM Shamsuzzaman. Mitra started his acting career with the theatre group Lalkuthi. He debuted in film acting through the film Jolchobi (1973).

== Personal life ==
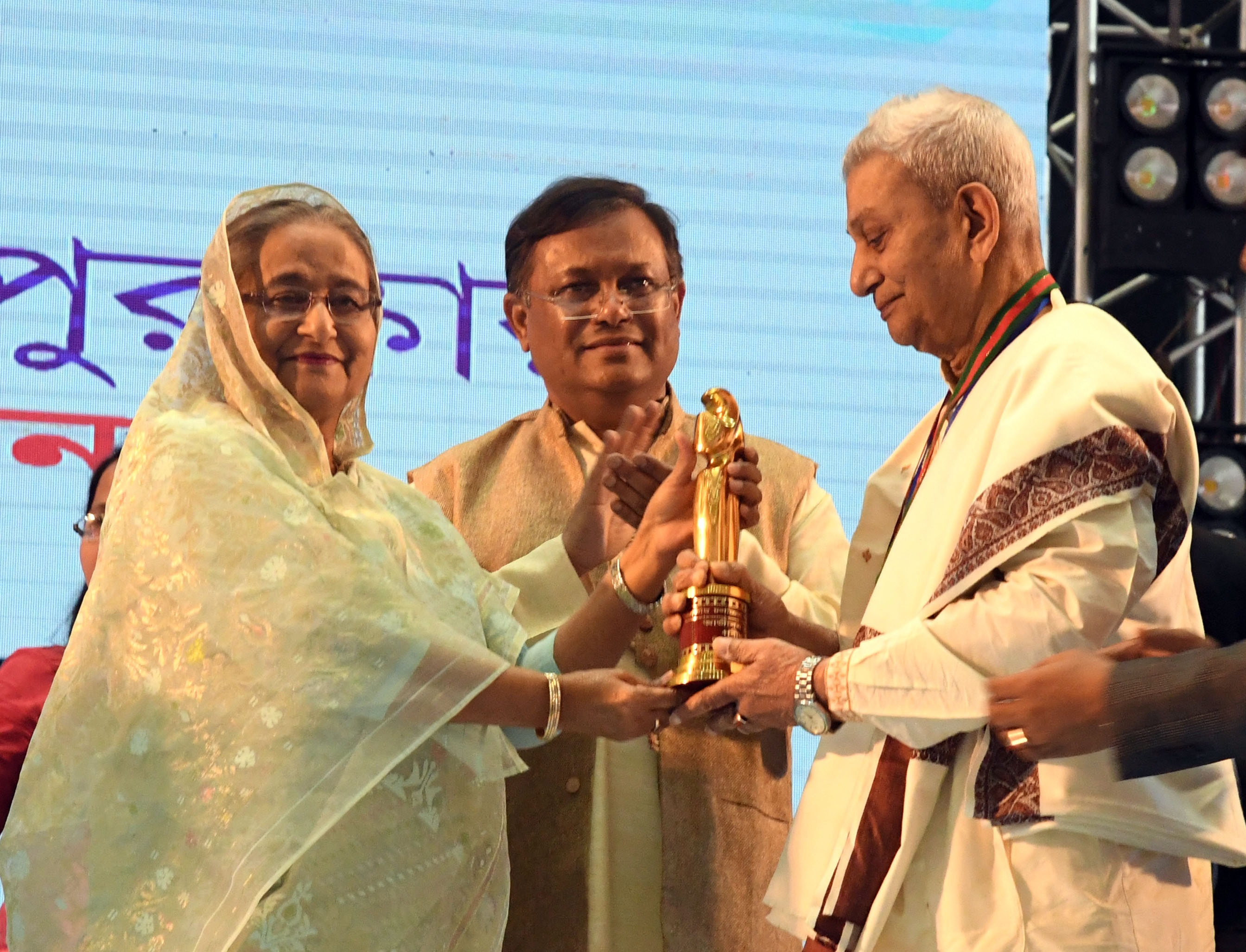
Mitra receives Lifetime Achievement Award in 2019.

Mitra converted to Islam from Hinduism and adopted the name Hasan Imam during his marriage in 1972. He was married to Selina Hossain (d. 2000), who was a Muslim. However, after marriage, she changed her name to Ajanta Mitra but never changed her religion. They had four children together: a daughter, Ferdous Parveen, and three sons, Mithun Mitra, Sifat Islam, and Samiul Islam. He lost his wife, Ajanta Mitra, in 2000 and his youngest son, Samiul Islam, in 2012.

== Death ==
Probir Mitra died on 5 January 2025, at the age of 83. As a Muslim, his funeral and burial were conducted according to Islamic rites. The first namaz-e-janaza for the veteran actor was held at the Film Development Corporation (FDC) after Zuhr prayers. The second namaz-e-janaza was held at the Channel i premises. His body was later buried in Azimpur graveyard.

== Filmography ==
- Titash Ekti Nadir Naam (1973)
- Juboraaj (1982) as Badshah Ehsan Azim Shah
- Nawab Sirajuddaula (1989)
- Ruti (1996)
- Buk Fatey To Mukh Foteyna (2012)
- Nekabborer Mohaproyan (2014)
- Shankhachil (2016)
