= Mohammad Moniruzzaman =

Bangladeshi writer, poet, professor, freedom fighter and lyricist (1936-2008)

- মোহাম্মদ মনিরুজ্জামান
- Born: 15 August 1936; Khorki para, Jessore District, Bengal Presidency, British India
- Died: 3 September 2008 (aged 72); Dhaka, Bangladesh
- Education: University of Dhaka
- Occupations: Professor, lyricist, writer, poet
- Awards: full list

Mohammad Moniruzzaman (15 August 1936 – 3 September 2008) was a Bangladeshi writer, poet, professor, freedom fighter and lyricist.

== Career ==
Moniruzzaman received his BA in 1958 and his MA in 1959 from University of Dhaka. In 1969, he got his Ph.D. on Hindu-Muslim relationship in modern Bengali poetry. He joined the University's Department of Bengali as a teaching advisor in 1959 and became a lecturer in 1962. He became a professor in 1975 and chair of the department in 1978. He was also district governor of the Rotary club (1986-1987) as well as a member of the Asiatic Society of Bangladesh.

== Awards ==
- Certificate of Merit for Distinguished Contribution to Poetry by International Who's Who in poetry of London (1969)
- Bangla Academy Literary Award (1972)
- Ekushey Padak (1987)
- Alaol Padak
- Fellow of the Royal Asiatic Society of London (1969)
- Fellow of Bangla Academy (1972)

== filmography ==
- Deep Nebhe Nai (1970)
- Nijere Haraye Khuji (1972)
- Tejjo Putro (1998)
