= Ityadi =

Magazine television programme of BTV created and presented by Hanif Sanket

- Screen shot from Ityadi featuring Hanif Sanket
- Genre: Magazine TV Show
- Created by: Hanif Sanket
- Presented by: Hanif Sanket
- Country of origin: Bangladesh
- Original language: Bengali

Production
- Production location: Dhaka

Original release
- Network: Bangladesh Television
- Release: 1989 – present

Ityadi (also known as Ittadi; Bengali: ইত্যাদি; English: "Etcetera"), pronounced EET-tah-dee, is a popular magazine television program in Bangladesh created and presented by Hanif Sanket that airs on Bangladesh Television. It is the longest running show on Bangladeshi television and also the longest-running magazine show in the world. It is a satire entertainment program being shown in Bangladesh Television for the last 37 years. Regular segments of the show include Nana-Naati (formerly) / Nani-Naati, Mama-Bhagne (formerly), Haba Hashmot (formerly), a foreign filmstrip dubbed in Bengali (formerly), country history, a mail section, a segment where foreigners act as Bangladeshis and represent the Culture of Bangladesh, a quiz round for audiences, live music, dance, and plays. Ityadi also helps to promote Bengali culture among the young generations in the age of cultural diversity due to globalization. It also brings many intellectual persons in music, drama or education into light.
